= Rembrandt Award =

Dutch film award

The Rembrandt Award was a Dutch film award. Initially created in 1993, it was not awarded between 1999 and 2006, but was recreated in 2007 by René Mioch. It has not been awarded since 2015.

== 2007 ==
- Zwartboek – Best Dutch Film
- Daniël Boissevain for Wild Romance – Best Dutch Actor
- Carice van Houten for Zwartboek – Best Dutch Actress
- Pirates of the Caribbean: Dead Man's Chest Special Edition – Best DVD Release
- Pirates of the Caribbean: Dead Man's Chest – Best Foreign Film
- Johnny Depp for Pirates of the Caribbean: Dead Man's Chest – Best Foreign Actor
- Meryl Streep for The Devil Wears Prada – Best Foreign Actress
- Henny Vrienten – Honorary Rembrandt Award for his film compositions

== 2008 ==
- Alles is Liefde – Best Dutch Film
- Thomas Acda for Alles is Liefde – Best Dutch Actor
- Carice van Houten for Alles is Liefde – Best Dutch Actress
- Zwartboek – Best DVD Release
- Pirates of the Caribbean: At World's End – Best Foreign Film
- Johnny Depp for Pirates of the Caribbean: At World's End – Best Foreign Actor
- Keira Knightley for Pirates of the Caribbean: At World's End and Atonement – Best Foreign Actress
- Pierre Bokma and Goldie Hawn – Honorary Rembrandt Awards

== 2009 ==
- Oorlogswinter – Best Dutch Film
- Martijn Lakemeier for Oorlogswinter – Best Dutch Actor
- Melody Klaver for Oorlogswinter – Best Dutch Actress
- Alles is Liefde – Best DVD Release
- Ilse DeLange with Miracle from the movie Bride Flight – Best Film Song
- Mamma Mia! – Best Foreign film
- Heath Ledger for The Dark Knight – Best Foreign Actor
- Meryl Streep for Mamma Mia! – Best Foreign Actress
- Willeke van Ammelrooy – Honorary Rembrandt Award

== 2010 ==
- Komt een vrouw bij de dokter – Best Dutch Film
- Barry Atsma for Komt een vrouw bij de dokter – Best Dutch Actor
- Carice van Houten for Komt een vrouw bij de dokter – Best Dutch Actress
- Harry Potter and the Half-Blood Prince – Best DVD/Blu-ray Release
- Kane with Love Over Healing from the movie Komt een vrouw bij de dokter – Best Film Song
- Avatar – Best Foreign Film
- Brad Pitt for The Curious Case of Benjamin Button – Best Foreign Actor
- Sandra Bullock for The Proposal – Best Foreign Actress
- Jany Temime – Honorary Rembrandt Award for her work as costume designer

== 2011 ==
- New Kids Turbo – Best Dutch Film
- Jeroen van Koningsbrugge for Loft – Best Dutch Actor
- Carice van Houten for De Gelukkige Huisvrouw – Best Dutch Actress
- Avatar – Best DVD/Blu-ray Release
- DJ Paul Elstak and the New Kids with Turbo – Best Film Song
- Inception – Best Foreign Film
- Johnny Depp for Alice in Wonderland (2010) – Best Foreign Actor
- Angelina Jolie for Salt – Best Foreign Actress
- Rene Mioch and Renée Soutendijk – Honorary Rembrandt for a professional career of 25 years and Honorary Rembrandt for film career

== 2012 ==
- Gooische Vrouwen – Best Dutch Film
- Rutger Hauer for De Heineken Ontvoering – Best Dutch Actor
- Carice van Houten for Black Butterflies – Best Dutch Actress
- Corry Konings with Hoeren neuken nooit meer werken from the film New Kids Nitro – Best Film Song
- Razend – Best Dutch Youth Film
- Harry Potter and the Deathly Hallows – Part 2 – Best Foreign Film
- Colin Firth for The King's Speech – Best Foreign Actor
- Natalie Portman for Black Swan – Best Foreign Actress
- Hans Kemna – Honorary Rembrandt for his contribution to the Dutch Film Industry

== 2013 ==
- Alles Is Familie – Best Dutch Film
- Thijs Römer for Alles Is Familie – Best Dutch Actor
- Carice van Houten for Alles Is Familie – Best Dutch Actress
- Racoon with Oceaan from the film Alles Is Familie – Best Film Song
- Achtste Groepers Huilen Niet – Best Dutch Youth Film
- Intouchables – Best Foreign Film
- Daniel Craig for Skyfall – Best Foreign Actor
- Meryl Streep for The Iron Lady – Best Foreign Actress

== 2014 ==
- De Nieuwe Wildernis - Best Dutch Film
- Barry Atsma for Mannenhart - Best Dutch Actor
- Angela Schijf for Daylight - Best Dutch Actress
- BLØF and Nielson with the title song for the film Mannenhart - Best Film Song
- Spijt! - Best Dutch Youth Film
- The Hunger Games: Catching Fire - Best Foreign Film
- Leonardo DiCaprio for The Great Gatsby – Best Foreign Actor
- Jennifer Lawrence for The Hunger Games: Catching Fire – Best Foreign Actress
- Nelly Frijda - Honorary Rembrandt Award

== 2015 ==
- Gooische Vrouwen 2 – Best Dutch Film
- Tygo Gernandt for Bloedlink – Best Dutch Actor
- Linda de Mol voor Gooische Vrouwen 2 – Best Dutch Actress
- Mr Probz with Nothing Really Matters from the film Gooische Vrouwen 2 – Best Film Song
- Oorlogsgeheimen – Best Dutch Youth Film
- 12 Years a Slave – Best Foreign Film
- Leonardo DiCaprio for The Wolf of Wall Street – Best Foreign Actor
- Angelina Jolie voor Maleficent – Best Foreign Actress
- Gijs Scholten van Aschat – Honorary Rembrandt Award
