= Bắc Ninh (disambiguation) =

Bắc Ninh is a city in northern Vietnam.

Bắc Ninh may also refer to:

- Bắc Ninh (provincial city), former provincial city of Bắc Ninh province
- Bac Ninh FC, a Vietnamese football club
- Bắc Ninh campaign, a military campaign between Chinese and French forces
- Bắc Ninh station, a railway station
