= Gift from the Heart =

2014 Dutch romantic comedy film

- Theatrical release poster
- Directed by: Kees van Nieuwkerk
- Written by: Jacqueline Epskamp; Ivo Martijn; Valentijn Moerdijk; Simone van Kome
- Produced by: Sander Emmering; Reinout Oerlemans; Maarten Swart
- Starring: Benja Bruijning; Fedja van Huêt; Chantal Janzen; Halina Reijn
- Cinematography: Daan Nieuwenhuijs
- Edited by: Peter Alderliesten
- Music by: Melcher Meirmans; Chrisnanne Wiegel
- Production companies: Eyeworks; RTL Entertainment; Inspire Pictures; Living Stone
- Distributed by: A-Film Benelux
- Release date: 6 November 2014 (Netherlands)
- Running time: 86 minutes
- Countries: Netherlands; United States
- Languages: Dutch; English
- Box office: $4,188,209

Gift from the Heart (Dutch: Pak van mijn hart) is 2014 Dutch romantic comedy directed by Kees van Nieuwkerk and with Jacqueline Epskamp credited as screenwriter and it stars Benja Bruijning, Fedja van Huêt, Chantal Janzen and Halina Reijn. It follows Julia, a marketer, who works for U.S. Cola in New York is sent to The Netherlands to launch Santa Man Cola during Sinterklaas, where she begins working with two brothers.

The film was released in Dutch theaters on 6 November 2014 and proved to be a major box-office hit grossing over 4 million euros and receiving a Platinum Film award. Critics compared the film unfavorable with films like Love Is All and Love Actually, calling it a poor imitation.

== Plot ==
The brothers Tom and Niek manage a clothing rental service and the Sinterklaas headquarters of their father Niek sr. Tom is a single former soap actor that is unable to take life seriously anymore, while Niek is a traditional family man and workaholic who is separated from his wife Karin. In the U.S., the beautiful marketing strategist Julia is send by an American-based soda manufacturer to the Netherlands to promote cola during the Sinterklaas festivities with a young handsome Santa. Tom and Niek are asked to co-develop her marketing strategy. This creates a love triangle between Tom, Niek and Julia. During her visit to the Netherlands, Julia stays with her sister, who has a husband and three children.

At first, Julia is stand-offish towards Tom and wants to keep strictly business, so Tom decides to be the young Santa Julia needs. His first appearance at the arrival of Sinterklaas by boat is poorly received by Julia and met with confusion by the audience. As a result, Julia temporarily terminates her deal with the duo, only for to be called by her boss who loves the idea of Niek as the sexy and hip Santa, which causes her to revert to the plan.

Niek and Julia go on a date as well, discussing business like hiring additional Santas, only for his ex-wife Karin to be there at the same restaurant with another man named Richard. When Niek tells about his divorce and not wanting to be around his ex-wife, Julia orchestrates an unexpected kiss between her and Niek, which she brushes off as "marketing", causing Karin to leave her date and the restaurant. At the same time, Tom is babysitting Lars, Karin and Niek's kid, and keeps texting Julia with his ideas, one of them a fight between the Santa and Sinterklaas. Upon returning Lars home, Tom consols a dejected Karin who is venting about her divorce from Niek, in the heat of the moment Karin kisses Tom, which is seen by an unnoticed Lars. They decide to not pursue any further.

Next scene there is a montage of the main three going through with hiring more Santas. While at work, Karin is trying to avoid Richard. Niek sr., the father of the brothers has dementia. He thinks he is Sinterklaas and walks sometimes on the roof of the retirement home searching for his horse. Lars, the son of Karin and Niek, asked for a gift that his parents rekindle their relationship and get back together. Tom and Julia go to a hotel, after she unable to contact her sister, but two don't spend the night together. Lars asks Sinterklaas in his wish list that his parents are going back together. Tom falls in love with Julia, only for her to prepare her a return to New York following a promotion. Tom is now determined to convince Julie to stay.

When Lars tells his father Niek that he saw Tom and Karin kiss, his wish is further away then ever. On Sinterklaas day, Sinterklaas and Santa set to fight in a staged match on live television that is watched internationally. Only, for Niek for dressed as Sinterklaas to fight his own brother who is Santa. Ultimately, the two brothers reconcile, but are scolded by their father dressed as Sinterklaas, telling them to make amends with both Julia and Karin.

In the epilogue, both couples are together.

== Cast ==
- Benja Bruijning as Tom Kuyper
- Fedja van Huêt as Niek Kuyper Jr.
- Chantal Janzen as Julia van Gaalen
- Halina Reijn as Karin Kuyper
- Nathan Meeter as Lars Kuyper
- Beppie Melissen as Nel
- Bram van der Vlugt as Niek Kuyper Sr.
- Loes Haverkort as Floor van Gaalen
- Leo Alkemade as Gerben
- Lisa Lapré as Anne
- Fay Visser as Saartje
- Maurits de Kroon as Willem
- Belinda van der Stoep as Gerda
- Frank Sheppard as Mr. Winston
- Marwan Kenzari as Richard

== Production ==
The film was directed by Kees van Nieuwkerk, who previously directed Sterke verhalen. Jacqueline Epskamp is credited as the main screenwriter, with script contributions by Ivo Martijn, Valentijn Moerwijk, Simone Kome van Breugel, Lotte Tabbers and Kees van Nieuwkerk. Chantal Janzen was cast as Julia, Benja Bruijning en Fedja van Huêt were cast as the main brothers, with both Janzen and Bruijning having played in previous winter romantic comedies in Love Is All and Family Way. Supporting roles were added with Halina Reijn, Loes Haverkort and Beppie Melissen. Bram van der Vlugt also joined the cast as the father, in the film he reprised the role of Sinterklaas, which he used to play him in real life until 2011. Nick & Simon wrote the title song for the film, it was released as a single.

== Release ==
The official premiere was on 27 October 2014 in Hilversum, with the wide release on 6 November 2014.

== Reception ==
The film was compared unfavorable by critics with 2007's Love Is All, another romantic comedy that was also set during Sinterklaas. the Stentor, the Algemeen Dagblad and Cinemagazine gave the film two out of five stars. Also de Volkskrant en De Telegraaf gave the film two stars, with De Telegraaf criticizing the 'sloppy direction' and pointed out the lack of chemistry between the leads. The Filmkrant viewed the gender politics in the film as regressive, with the women being overly passive and submissive.

The film was a major success with audiences, after three days it was awarded the Golden Film for having 100.000 visitors. On 24 December 2014, it was announced the film had attracted over 400.000 visitors and received the Platinum Film.
