= Stricken =

Stricken may refer to:

- "Stricken" (song), a 2005 song by Disturbed
- "Stricken", a 1995 song by No Doubt from The Beacon Street Collection
- Stricken (2009 film), a 2009 Dutch drama film
- Stricken, a 2005 short film featuring Hayley Mills
- "Stricken", when a warship's name is removed from a country's Navy Directory
