= Heirs of the Night =

Television series

- Heirs of the Night Logo
- German: Die Erben der Nacht
- Norwegian: Nattens arvinger
- Created by: Maria von Heland; Diederik van Rooijen
- Based on: Die Erben der Nacht by Ulrike Schweikert
- Written by: Maria von Heland; Diederik van Rooijen
- Directed by: Diederik van Rooijen
- Composers: Bart Westerlaken; Stein Berge Svendsen
- Countries of origin: Germany; Netherlands; Latvia; Norway
- Original language: English
- No. of seasons: 2
- No. of episodes: 26

Production
- Cinematography: Rolf Dekens
- Editors: Moek de Groot; Stanley Kolk; Ruben van der Hammen
- Running time: 25 minutes
- Production companies: Lemming Film; Hamster Film; Maze Pictures; Maipo Film; Nukleus Film; Tasse Film; ZDF Enterprises

Original release
- Network: NRK1 (Norway); NDR & Kika (Germany); NPO 3 (Netherlands)
- Release: October 25, 2019 – November 1, 2020

Heirs of the Night is a television series created and written by Maria von Heland and Diederik van Rooijen, and directed by Diederik van Rooijen. The story is based on the book series Die Erben der Nacht by Ulrike Schweikert.

== Synopsis ==
The series is set in 1889 and focuses on children with special powers who attend vampire school. The main character, a 14-year-old girl named Alisa, discovers her unique power, which is a magic light called the "spark". The heirs of several vampire clans that are spread across Europe come together to attend the vampire school. The clans were created by Dracula, who gave them each a ruby with special powers. The series relates how Alisa manages her unique power, while also dealing with everyday teenage problems.

== Cast ==
- Anastasia Martin as Alisa von Vamalia
- Ulrik William Græsli as Lars af Dracas
- Aisling Sharkey as Ivy of Lycana
- Jordan Adene as Malcolm of Vyrad
- Charlie Banks as Tammo von Vamalia
- Liam Nicolosi as Luciano di Nosferas
- Ines Høysæter Asserson as Inger af Dracas
- Scarlett Rousset as Joanne de Pyras
- Lance West as Nicu
- Finian Duff Lennon as Seymour of Lycana
- Mina Dale as Fanny af Dracas
- Vegar Hoel as Baron Magnus af Dracas
- Hildegard Schmahl as Dame Elina von Vamalia
- Francesco De Vito as Conte Claudio di Nosferas
- Simonetta Solder as Contessa Viola di Nosferas
- Annick Christiaens as Baroness Audrey de Pyras
- Leo Wringer as Sir Milton of Vyrad
- Eindride Eidsvold as Ragnar af Dracas
- Pietro Ragusa as Signor Umberto di Nosferas
- Sallie Harmsen as Tonka of Upiry
- Julian Bleach as Dracula
- Florian Bartholomäi as Hindrik
- Lena Kvitvik as Karen af Dracas
- Christina Chong as Calvina
- Giovanni Dominoni as Deputy of Police
- Anna Drijver as Lady Anna von Vamalia
- Belinda Low as Noaidi
- Antonio Scarpa as Dracula's Shadow
- Monic Hendrickx as Elisabetha
- Benja Bruijning as Abraham van Helsing
- Tatjana Nardone as Raphaella
- Stefan Weinert as Ger. Redmask Leader
- Kenneth Åkerland Berg as Young Baron Magnus
- Tihomir Kosic as Hamburg Redmask
- Mario Vudric as Redmask

== Vampire Families (source: from the series) ==
They are 13 Vampire Families, also known as Clans:

- Dracas: This clan is from Norway and they have won the most rubies. Their birth power is telepathy but by winning fights against other vampire clans during the clan wars, they gained the rubies of Vikla and Grimur. It is said that Dracas are the most ruthless and the most power hungry. They didn't have any mercy during the clan war (Dracas known: Baron Magnus, his son Lars, his brother General Ragnar, his nieces Inger and Fanny. Their Shadow : Karen);
- Vamalia: This clan lives in Hamburg, Germany and have the power of love - a power the other clans say is the most useless and weakest of all the powers (Vamalia known: Dame Elina, her daughter Anna and her grand-kids Alisa and Tammo. Their Shadow : Hindrik);
- Nosferas: This clan lives in Naples, Italy. Their ruby, encrusted in an inverted cross, has the power to make crosses and holy water inactive against vampires. This clan won a battle against the Arrufat, thereby gaining their ruby (Nosferas known: Conte Claudio, Contessa Viola, their son Luciano, Umberto and their Shadow : Raffaela);
- Pyras: They live in France and their ruby gives them the power to talk with animals (Pyras known: Madame Aubrey and her daughter Joanne);
- Vyrad: They are from England. Their power is the control of the elements control over wind, lightning, rain, snow and cloud creation (Vyrad known: Sir Milton and his son Malcolm);
- Lycana: This clan is from Ireland. They fought against the Dracas and the Nosferas but it is currently unknown as to who exactly killed them with only the heir of the Lycana clan surviving with their ruby. The ruby of his clan has the power of animal shapeshifting . Seymour bit a young girl (Ivy) twice, thereby transforming her into a shadow vampire so as to not be alone. It is said that the Upiry took their ruby and gave it to Dracula, trapping Seymour in wolf form as he had shape shifted into a wolf when the Upiry stole his ruby. however, the Upiry was destroyed and the ruby was given back to Seymour (Lycana known: Seymour and "his Shadow" : Ivy);
- Upiry: They come from Romania. This clan had the ruby with the power of astral projection (sending their shadow to communicate or to spy on others). They were under the protection of Dracula during the war against him. Having fought for him, the others clans thought them all dead and extinct, however, Dracula, before being defeated and placed into a sleep, turned them all into bats and imprisoned them in his dungeon. Awakening 300 years later, Dracula liberated a vampire named Tonka so she could steal all the rubies from the Elders- a task if successful would mean the liberation of her clan (Upiry known: Tonka, Tonka's father. Other Upiry names unknown);
- Caminada: They come from Switzerland and their ruby grants the power of Invisibility;
- Vikla: They come from Greece. The ruby of the Vikla grants the power of telekinesis;
- Tova: They come from The Netherlands. The ruby of the Tova allows the vampire to move in water;
- Belov: They come from Russia. The ruby grants the power to walk in sunlight;
- Grimur: They come from Austria. Their ruby has the power to capture sunlight;
- Arrufat: They come from Spain. The ruby of the Arrufat has the power to talk with the dead.

== Production ==
=== Development ===
The series was produced by the Dutch production company Lemming Film in collaboration with Hamster Film, Maze Pictures, Tasse Film and Maipo Film.

In December 2017, the series received a financial contribution of close to €720,000 by the Netherlands Film Production Incentive. In March 2018, the series received another financial contribution of close to €250,000. Initially it was planned for Marco van Geffen to direct the series. Latvian production company Tasse Film received €561,889 for filming part of the series in Latvia.

=== Casting ===
On 11 June 2018, it was announced that Monic Hendrickx, Sallie Harmsen and Benja Bruijning were added to the cast.

=== Filming ===
Principal photography commenced on 4 June 2018 and was scheduled until February 2019. Filming concluded on 22 March 2019. Filming took place in Norway, Latvia and Croatia.
