= Reckless (2014 film) =

2014 Dutch film

- Theatrical release poster
- Dutch: Bloedlink
- Directed by: Joram Lürsen
- Written by: Frank Ketelaar
- Based on: The Disappearance of Alice Creed; 2009 film by J Blakeson
- Produced by: Arnold Heslenfeld; Frans van Gestel
- Starring: Tygo Gernandt; Marwan Kenzari; Sarah Chronis
- Cinematography: Jasper Wolf
- Edited by: Job ter Burg
- Music by: Merlijn Snitker
- Production companies: Topkapi Films; BNN
- Distributed by: A-Film Benelux
- Release date: 24 September 2014
- Country: Netherlands
- Language: Dutch
- Box office: $341,998

Reckless (Dutch: Bloedlink) is a 2014 Dutch thriller film directed by Joram Lürsen. The film is a Dutch-language remake of the 2009 film The Disappearance of Alice Creed. The film was the opening film of the Netherlands Film Festival in 2014.

In 2015, Tygo Gernandt won the Rembrandt Award for his role in the film.

The soundtrack for the film was made by the Dutch band Kensington.

== Plot ==
Two ex-convicts, Victor (Tygo Gernandt) and Rico (Marwan Kenzari) kidnap a millionaire's daughter, Laura Temming (Sarah Chronis). They force her into a van in broad daylight and soon after begin negotiating ransom with her father. They remove all evidence by stripping their van, removing all of Laura's clothes and preventing her from sitting on a toilet, instead forcing her to use a bedpan for peeing while handcuffed and ballgagged. The kidnapper's plan do not unfold when Laura manages to grab a gun when pretending to use the bucket to poop.

== Cast ==
- Tygo Gernandt as Victor
- Marwan Kenzari as Rico
- Sarah Chronis as Laura Temming

== Production ==
Filming took place in the Dutch town of Oudewater.
