= Sarah Chronis =

Dutch actress (born 1986)

- Born: 27 August 1986 (age 40); Amsterdam, Netherlands
- Occupation: Actress

Sarah Chronis (born 27 August 1986) is a Dutch actress. She is known for her role as Eva Persijn in the television series Onderweg naar morgen.

== Career ==
Chronis played roles in the television series Rozengeur & Wodka Lime (2004), Kinderen geen bezwaar (2011), Seinpost Den Haag (2011), Flikken Maastricht (2014), Meiden van de Herengracht (2015), Centraal Medisch Centrum (2017) and Nieuwe buren (2019).

Chronis plays a lead role in the 2014 film Reckless directed by Joram Lürsen.

In 2019, Chronis participated in the reality television show Wie is de Mol?, correctly identifying the mole (Merel Westrik) and winning the show. In the same year, she made her debut in the long-running soap opera Goede tijden, slechte tijden in the 6000th episode.

Chronis appears in the film BOEIEN! directed by Bob Wilbers, in the 2023 film Fijn weekend directed by Jon Karthaus, and in the 2023 Netflix film Oei, ik groei!.

She appeared in an episode of the 2025 anniversary season of the television show Wie is de Mol?.

== Filmography ==
=== Film ===
- Reckless (2014)
- BOEIEN! (2022)
- Fijn weekend (2023)
- Oei, ik groei! (2023)

=== Television ===
- Rozengeur & Wodka Lime (2004)
- Kinderen geen bezwaar (2011)
- Seinpost Den Haag (2011)
- Flikken Maastricht (2014)
- Meiden van de Herengracht (2015)
- Centraal Medisch Centrum (2017)
- Nieuwe buren (2019)
- Goede tijden, slechte tijden (2019)
- Wie is de Mol? (2019)
