= Bad Banks =

German-Luxembourgish television series

- Genre: Drama
- Created by: Oliver Kienle
- Directed by: Christian Schwochow
- Starring: Paula Beer; Barry Atsma; Desiree Nosbusch; Mai Duong Kieu; Albrecht Schuch; Tobias Moretti; Jean-Marc Barr; Marc Limpach; Germain Wagner; Jörg Schüttauf; Jeff Wilbusch; Utsav Agrawal
- Composer: Kyan Bayani
- Country of origin: Germany; Luxembourg
- Original language: German
- No. of seasons: 2
- No. of episodes: 12

Production
- Executive producers: Lisa Blumenberg; Günther Russ; Nicolas Steil
- Cinematography: Frank Lamm
- Editors: Julia Karg; Jens Klüber
- Camera setup: Single-camera
- Running time: 50–53 minutes
- Production companies: Letterbox Filmproduktion; Iris Productions

Original release
- Network: ZDF, ARTE
- Release: February 22, 2018 – present

Bad Banks is a German-Luxembourgish television series first aired in February 2018. In March 2018, it was renewed for a second season. In the U.S., the series was acquired by Hulu.

== Production ==
Production was carried out by Federation Entertainment and the first season was filmed in Berlin, Frankfurt am Main, London and Luxembourg.

== Release ==
The first series consisting of six episodes was premiered in Berlin in February 2018 and broadcast on ARTE on March 2, 2018. Subsequently, U.S. network Hulu acquired the series. In August 2018, the series was released in the Netherlands on the channel AVROTROS. The series is also available on Netflix in Germany, Luxembourg, Netherlands, Switzerland and France. Series 1 & 2 are both available in the UK from Channel 4 / Walter Presents. The series is also available in Poland from TVP and on CBC Gem in Canada.

== Cast ==
Actor/Actress	Role	Age	Details
Paula Beer	Jana Liekam	25	Former Crédit International (CI) structurer
Barry Atsma	Gabriel Fenger	45	Deutsche Global Invest (DGI) investment division head
Désirée Nosbusch	Christelle Leblanc	49	CI executive, former financial crime agent
Mai Duong Kieu	Thao Hoang	31	DGI analyst, Jana's team member
Albrecht Schuch	Adam Pohl	29	DGI salesman, Jana's team member
Tobias Moretti	Quirin Sydow	50	DGI CFO, has a past with Fenger
Jean-Marc Barr	Robert Khano	53	DGI CEO, colluding with Sydow
Marc Limpach	Luc Jacoby	40	Former CI banker, Jana's ex-colleague
Germain Wagner	Ties Jacoby		CI board member, Luc's father
Jörg Schüttauf	Peter Schultheiß	53	Lord Mayor of Leipzig
Jeff Wilbusch	Noah Weisz	33	Jana's boyfriend with a 5-year-old daughter

== Episodes ==
=== Season 1 (2018) ===
No. overall	No. in season	Title	Directed by	Written by	Original release date	Viewers (millions)
1	1	"Fired" (German: Die Kündigung)	Christian Schwochow	Oliver Kienle, Jana Burbach & Jan Galli	February 21, 2018	N/A
2	2	"Follow the Junk" (German: Folge dem Schrott)	Christian Schwochow	Oliver Kienle, Jana Burbach & Jan Galli	February 21, 2018	N/A
3	3	"The Man from London" (German: Der Mann aus London)	Christian Schwochow	Oliver Kienle, Jana Burbach & Jan Galli	February 22, 2018	N/A
4	4	"Old Debts" (German: Alte Schulden)	Christian Schwochow	Oliver Kienle, Jana Burbach & Jan Galli	February 22, 2018	N/A
5	5	"The Hardest Currency" (German: Die härteste Währung)	Christian Schwochow	Oliver Kienle, Jana Burbach & Jan Galli	February 22, 2018	N/A
6	6	"The Lion's Den" (German: Die Höhle des Löwen)	Christian Schwochow	Oliver Kienle, Jana Burbach & Jan Galli	February 22, 2018	N/A

=== Season 2 (2020) ===
No. overall	No. in season	Title	Directed by	Written by	Original release date	Viewers (millions)
7	1	"Brave New World" (German: Schöne neue Welt)	Christian Zübert	Oliver Kienle	January 30, 2020	N/A
8	2	"Dying Banks" (German: Bankensterben (ZDF) / Der neue Gegner (Arte))	Christian Zübert	Oliver Kienle	January 30, 2020	N/A
9	3	"Collateral Damage" (German: Kollateralschaden)	Christian Zübert	Oliver Kienle	January 30, 2020	N/A
10	4	"Today's Winners" (German: Die Gewinner von heute)	Christian Zübert	Oliver Kienle	January 30, 2020	N/A
11	5	"Paranoia" (German: Paranoia (ZDF) / Dunkelheit (Arte))	Christian Zübert	Oliver Kienle	January 30, 2020	N/A
12	6	"Long Live The Queen" (German: Long live the Queen)	Christian Zübert	Oliver Kienle	January 30, 2020	N/A
