= Vincent in Brixton =

2002 play by Nicholas Wright

- Original language: English
- Written by: Nicholas Wright
- Genre: Drama

Premiere
- Place: Cottesloe Theatre; London

Vincent in Brixton is a 2002 play by Nicholas Wright. The play premiered at London's National Theatre with Jochum ten Haaf in the title role. It transferred to the Playhouse Theatre and later to Broadway.

It focuses on artist Vincent van Gogh's time in Brixton, London in 1873. In the play, which is largely fictional, he falls in love with an English widow. It was revived by The Original Theatre Company in 2009.

Vincent Van Gogh was played by Doro Surcel.

== Characters ==
- Ursula
- Eugenie
- Anna
- Vincent
- Sam

== Awards and nominations ==
Awards

- 2003 Laurence Olivier Award for Best New Play

Nominations

- 2003 Tony Award for Best Play
