= The Possession of Hannah Grace =

2018 American horror thriller film

- Theatrical release poster
- Directed by: Diederik van Rooijen
- Written by: Brian Sieve
- Produced by: Todd Garner; Sean Robins
- Starring: Shay Mitchell; Grey Damon; Kirby Johnson; Stana Katic
- Cinematography: Lennert Hillege
- Edited by: Stanley Kolk; Jake York
- Music by: John Frizzell
- Production companies: Screen Gems; Broken Road Productions; Spinel Entertainment; Mist Entertainment
- Distributed by: Sony Pictures Releasing
- Release date: November 30, 2018 (United States)
- Running time: 86 minutes
- Country: United States
- Language: English
- Budget: $6–7.7 million
- Box office: $43 million

The Possession of Hannah Grace (released as Cadaver in select international markets) is a 2018 American supernatural horror thriller film directed by Diederik van Rooijen and written by Brian Sieve. The film stars Shay Mitchell, Kirby Johnson, Stana Katic, Grey Damon, and Nick Thune and was produced by Todd Garner and Sean Robins.

The film was released in the United States on November 30, 2018, by Sony Pictures Releasing under the Screen Gems label. It received generally negative reviews from critics but was a commercial success, grossing $43 million worldwide against a production budget of $7.7 million.

== Plot ==
During an exorcism ritual, Hannah Grace—possessed by a demonic entity—levitates and nearly kills a priest before her father, Grainger, ends the ritual by suffocating her with a pillow. As he mourns over her body, a fly lands on her hand, and it twitches, suggesting the presence of the demon remains.

Three months later, Megan Reed, a former Boston police officer struggling with depression and pill addiction following the death of her partner, begins working the night shift at the Boston Metro Hospital morgue. The morgue is housed in an imposing brutalist-style building (portrayed by Boston City Hall). On her second shift, Megan refuses entry to a distressed man (later revealed to be Grainger), while shortly thereafter assisting EMT Randy with receiving the corpse of a young woman—Hannah Grace—who had been stabbed and partially burned in an alley.

As Megan attempts to log the body, her equipment malfunctions, and the corpse's fingerprints return unreadable. Strange events begin to occur, increasing Megan's suspicions. She eventually catches Grainger trying to destroy the body, claiming his daughter is not truly dead and must be cremated. He is restrained and taken into police custody.

Megan's ex-boyfriend, Officer Andrew Kurtz, investigates and confirms that Hannah died three months prior, yet her fingerprints match those recently recorded. Meanwhile, Hannah, reanimated and possessing supernatural abilities, begins killing staff members, including Dave, a security guard, and Megan's friend Lisa, as her body appears to heal itself with each death.

Megan uncovers surveillance footage of Hannah moving through the building and confronts Randy with the evidence, though he is soon killed. Grainger escapes custody and returns to the morgue, explaining that multiple exorcisms failed and the demon was able to continue inhabiting Hannah's corpse, growing stronger by killing others. He reveals that Hannah suffered from depression, which allowed the demon to take hold.

Megan agrees to help Grainger cremate the body, but Hannah reanimates, kills her father, and traps Megan. With the help of Andrew and another guard, Megan escapes and ultimately drags the body to the crematorium. After a final confrontation, Megan succeeds in pushing Hannah into the incinerator, destroying the body.

In the aftermath, Megan reveals she has remained clean for over two months. In the final scene, a fly lands on her mirror reflection, which she quickly swats, suggesting the threat may not be entirely over.

== Cast ==
- Shay Mitchell as Megan Reed, a troubled ex-cop who takes the graveyard shift in a morgue.
- Kirby Johnson as Hannah Grace, a girl possessed and resurrected by demons.
- Grey Damon as Andrew Kurtz, a police officer and Megan's ex-boyfriend.
- Stana Katic as Lisa Roberts, a nurse and Megan's friend.
- Louis Herthum as Grainger Grace, Hannah Grace's father.
- Nick Thune as Randy, an EMT and friend of Megan's.
- Jacob Ming-Trent as Ernie Gainor, a security guard at the hospital.
- Max McNamara as Dave, a security guard at the hospital who has a crush on Megan.

== Production ==
=== Development ===
On March 23, 2016, it was announced that Screen Gems had hired Diederik van Rooijen to direct a horror thriller titled Cadaver, from a screenplay by Brian Sieve. The project was set to be produced by Todd Garner and Sean Robins through Broken Road Productions. The film was later retitled The Possession of Hannah Grace.

=== Casting ===
On June 6, 2016, Shay Mitchell was announced as the lead, cast in the role of Megan Reed. Additional casting was confirmed on October 28, 2016, including Stana Katic, Grey Damon, Nick Thune, Jacob Ming-Trent, Max McNamara, Louis Herthum, and Kirby Johnson.

=== Filming ===
Principal photography began on November 8, 2016, in Boston, Massachusetts. Key crew included director of photography Lennert Hillege, production designer Paula Loos, and costume designer Deborah Newhall. Filming also took place at New England Studios in Devens, Massachusetts. Notably, the film was shot entirely using a Sony α7S II camera, marking the first feature film to be filmed with a mirrorless full-frame digital camera.

== Release ==
The Possession of Hannah Grace was released in the United States and Canada on November 30, 2018. In select international markets, including Brazil, Greece, and Israel, the film premiered a day earlier on November 29, 2018.

Sony Pictures released the first official trailer for the film online on October 15, 2018. The studio reportedly spent approximately $12 million on promotional efforts.

== Reception ==
=== Box office ===
The Possession of Hannah Grace grossed $14.8 million in the United States and Canada and $28.2 million in other territories, for a worldwide total of $43 million, against a production budget of approximately $7.7 million.

In the United States and Canada, the film was projected to earn between $3 million and $7 million from 2,065 theaters during its opening weekend. It grossed $2.6 million on its first day, which included $625,000 from Thursday night previews. It went on to debut with $6.5 million, finishing seventh at the box office. Given its modest budget, Sony considered any opening above $5.5 million to be a success, referring to the film as a "low-budget cash grab in the current slow marketplace." In its second weekend, the film declined by 51% to $3.2 million, a stronger-than-average hold for a horror release, which typically sees drops of over 60%.

=== Critical response ===
The Possession of Hannah Grace received generally negative reviews from critics. On the review aggregator Rotten Tomatoes, the film holds an approval rating of 22% based on 55 reviews, with an average rating of 4.2/10. The website's critical consensus reads: "The Possession of Hannah Grace feints at real horror just often enough to offer hints of the movie it should have been—and further frustrate viewers seeking a good scare." On Metacritic, the film has a weighted average score of 37 out of 100, based on 10 critics, indicating "generally unfavorable reviews". Audiences polled by CinemaScore gave the film an average grade of "C−" on an A+ to F scale, while those surveyed by PostTrak gave it a 36% overall positive score and a 24% "definite recommend".

Christy Lemire of RogerEbert.com gave the film 1.5 out of 4 stars, describing it as "tedious" despite its brief runtime and criticizing its underdeveloped characters and abrupt ending. Variety similarly noted the film's reliance on genre clichés, stating that it "struggles to differentiate itself" within the exorcism subgenre. The Seattle Times wrote that the film "never fully takes hold," pointing to ineffective scares and a lack of emotional depth.

Other reviewers criticized the film's limited originality and narrative coherence. Common Sense Media echoed similar sentiments, stating that although the premise was intriguing, the execution lacked suspense and cohesion. Bloody Disgusting described it as "a stitched-together mess," while Plugged In characterized it as "a cold room chock-full of bleak and bloody bumps and battles."
