= Mai Duong Kieu =

German film and stage actor

Mai Kieu
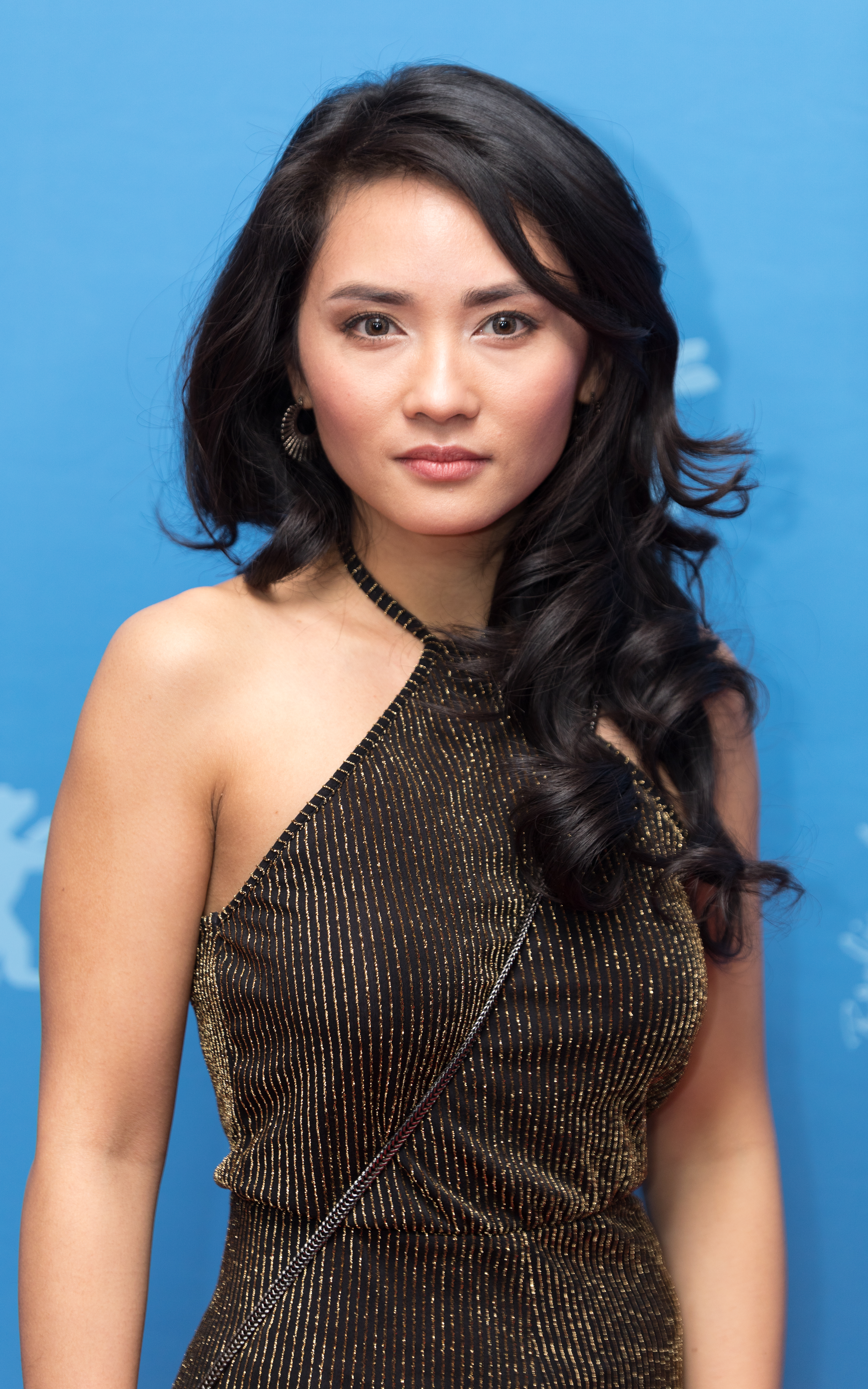
- Kieu in 2018
- Born: 1987 (age 38–39); Bac Ninh, Bac Ninh province, Vietnam
- Occupation: Actress
- Website: MaiDuongKieu.de

Mai Duong Kieu (born 1987) is a Vietnamese-born German film and stage actress. She is trained in martials arts and she has appeared in German and American productions including as a banker in the German-Luxembourgish television series Bad Banks.

== Life ==
Kieu was born in 1987 in Bắc Ninh in Vietnam. She and her family moved to Chemnitz when she was five. She had to adapt to the change in culture and for a time she did not realise that she was treated differently because she was a Vietnamese German child. She realises that she was brought up in right-wing views and she wasn't surprised when there were right-wing riots in Chemnitz in 2018 that targeted migrants. Mai Duong Kieu's father was a teacher of martial arts and he taught her. Her parents hoped that she would take over her fathers martial arts school, but this did not happen. She does however have her own students.

Kieu trained as an actor in Leipzig and then acted in drama series created for German or American TV. In 2014, she appeared as one of the three fates in the fantasy TV competition The Quest with Florence Kasumba and Stephanie Buddenbrock.

Bad Banks is a German-Luxembourgish television series which was first made available in February 2018. She played a tough woman banker which could be seen as a stereotype. Kieu says that she does get given roles that follow the stereotype but she says she needs to ignore this aspect of an acting opportunity. However she does offer to reduce or even lose the accent if that is possible. When she was originally cast for the role the character was Chinese woman with a Chinese name. It was agreed to change the character to be Vietnamese and she was asked to advise on what might be a likely Vietnamese name. The "alpha female" banker character that she created was appreciated.

Bad Banks was booked for a second series. Filming was in Berlin, Luxembourg, Frankfurt, and in the Caribbean. The second series was screened in 2020.

Mai Duong Kieu portrays a nurse at Dr. Ricky's clinic in the 2021 film Gunpowder Milkshake.

From 2020 to 2026 she played a doctor in German TV show In aller Freundschaft.
