= Stroup =

Stroup may refer to:

== People ==
- Carrie Stroup (born 1982), American fashion model, TV host, and beauty pageant titleholder
- Dan Stroup (born 1968), Canadian lacrosse coach
- George Stroup (born 1944), American professor and minister
- Jessica Stroup (born 1986), American actress
- Keith Stroup, American attorney; founder of the National Organization for the Reform of Marijuana Laws
- Richard L. Stroup (died 2021), American free-market environmentalist and economics professor
- Sheila Stroup (born 1943), American columnist
- Stanley Stroup (1904–1977), American politician; member of the Pennsylvania State Senate
- Theodore G. Stroup (born 1940), retired United States Army Lieutenant General
- Chuck Stroup, American student involved in the 1969 Zip to Zap riot
- Jane S. Shaw (also Jane Shaw Stroup), American free-market environmentalist, editor, and journalist

== Places ==
- Stroup Peak, a peak in Victoria Land, Antarctica
- Garth Stroup Home, a historic home in Mishawaka, St. Joseph County, Indiana, U.S.

== See also ==
- Stroop (disambiguation)
