= The Resistance Banker =

2018 film

- Film poster
- Directed by: Joram Lürsen
- Written by: Marieke van der Pol; Thomas van der Ree
- Starring: Barry Atsma; Jacob Derwig; Pierre Bokma; Fockeline Ouwerkerk; Raymond Thiry
- Cinematography: Mark van Aller
- Edited by: Peter Alderliesten
- Music by: Merlijn Snitker
- Distributed by: Dutch FilmWorks
- Release date: 8 March 2018
- Running time: 123 minutes
- Country: Netherlands
- Language: Dutch
- Box office: $4 million

The Resistance Banker (Dutch: Bankier van het Verzet) is a 2018 Dutch World War II period drama film directed by Joram Lürsen. It is based on the life of banker Walraven van Hall who financed the Dutch resistance during the war. It became the most-watched Dutch film of 2018 and was nominated for eleven Golden Calves, the first time that a film received so many nominations for the award. It won four Golden Calves, among them the prizes for Best Film and Best Actor. It was also selected as the Dutch entry for the Best Foreign Language Film category at the 91st Academy Awards, but it was not nominated.

== Plot ==
=== 1941 ===
Shortly after the German occupation of the Netherlands, Nazi collaborator Rost von Tonningen is installed as head of the Dutch State Bank. Walraven "Wally" van Hall, an Amsterdam financier, discovers that a Jewish colleague and his family have committed suicide after being ordered to surrender their home to the Germans. As Wally departs their house, a man approaches him and asks whether Wally thinks it's time to "fight back". The man is a member of the resistance, going by the alias 'van den Berg', who runs an illegal fund that pays escaped sailors to work for the Dutch government-in-exile. Van den Berg convinces Wally to organize a similar fund for members of the resistance in Amsterdam.

Von Tonningen informs Wally's brother, Gijsbrecht "Gijs" van Hall, about his suspicions of illegal activity and notifies him that large-denomination bills will be removed from circulation. Wally recruits Gijs to help run the resistance fund and the two brothers plug their networks to rapidly disperse the large-denomination cash they've already collected. They are so successful that they decide to widen their web and collect more money, now in small denominations. Wally, going by the name "van Tuyl", calls a meeting with resistance leaders and convinces them to systematize their finances using him as their banker. The government-in-exile guarantees reimbursement of thirty million guilder. Von Tonningen recruits SS intelligence to hunt down the shadow bank financing the resistance. They eventually capture a resistance member who, under duress, discloses Wally's alias.

=== 1944 ===
Resistance courier Jeanette Veentra loses her nerve in front of a German patrol and is exposed carrying pro-Dutch newspapers. Her boyfriend, Jonas van Berkel, pleads for her release but the Germans are aware of his resistance ties and offer an ultimatum, aid in the capture of fellow members or face imprisonment. Van Berkel counters and strikes a deal, he will help track down van Tuyl if Veentra is released.

The exiled government in London orders a national railroad strike. Running low on funds to pay the striking workers, Wally initiates a scheme. He plans to steal treasury bonds from the State Bank and replace them with forged copies. On his way to arrange for purchase of the ink needed for the forgery, a local barber narrowly saves him from German capture. The ink vendor tries to escape and is killed in the street by the Germans. Wally witnesses this and decides to go into hiding.

The Germans apprehend and eventually execute Van den Berg after he knocks on the door of a compromised resistance residence. Several resistance members back out of the movement, fearing for their lives. Van Berkel and Veentra devise another trap that results in the deaths of several resistance members and the capture of Jaap, a close colleague of the van Halls.

Wally finalizes the forged treasury bonds and executes the plan after much suspense. Gijs appears to meet with a group of Dutch officials who are irked to hear that he and Wally have stolen more in treasury bonds than the government guaranteed in reimbursement. Gijs pushes back, declaring that the officials have no idea what it's like under German occupation.

=== 1945 ===
In January 1945, Wally briefly returns home to see his family. Members of the resistance, including Huub, tail van Berkel to a church where he meets with a German officer. Van Berkel flees and the officer is killed but Huub is captured. He cooperates, facilitating the capture of several other resistance members and the German revelation of a key resistance residence. Wally is also captured but the Germans don't realize he is van Tuyl.

Gijs informs Tilly of Wally's capture and says they must go into hiding but that he will keep the operation running regardless. Huub discloses to the Germans that Wally is van Tuyl. Wally is interrogated by von Tonningen, but Wally only mocks him and tells him to enjoy his comfort while it lasts. Wally is lined up on a river bank with several other prisoners and executed.

Gijs informs a stricken Tilly of Wally's murder. The resistance finds and summarily executes van Berkel. The Allies liberate the Netherlands and arrest von Tonningen. It is implied that he is murdered while under guard; suicide is the cover story.

It is revealed that the Dutch officials who spoke with Gijs are post-war cabinet ministers hearing Gijs' account of events after the fact. They ask why they should believe him and he places a briefcase on the table, saying that every fund transaction is accounted for on the administrative papers it contains. As Gijs departs the meeting, an official asks that he not disclose his story to anyone else, as it implicates the government in bank fraud. Gijs agrees, then departs into the street.

== Cast ==
- Barry Atsma as Walraven van Hall
- Jacob Derwig as Gijs van Hall
- Pierre Bokma as Meinoud Rost van Tonningen
- Raymond Thiry as Van den Berg
- Steef de Bot as Jonas van Berkel
- Fockeline Ouwerkerk as Tilly van Hall
- Jochum ten Haaf as Jaap Buijs
- Matteo van der Grijn as Huub van Schie
- Ali Zijlstra as Jeanette Veentra
- Götz Schubert as SD Officer Friedrich Viebahn

== Reception ==
=== Box office ===
The Resistance Banker grossed $4 million in Netherlands.

=== Critical response ===
The film has an approval rating of 100% based on 5 reviews, and an average rating of 7.1/10 on the review site Rotten Tomatoes.

== See also ==
- List of Dutch submissions for the Academy Award for Best Foreign Language Film
- List of submissions to the 91st Academy Awards for Best Foreign Language Film
