= Stella's oorlog =

2009 film

- Theatrical release poster
- Directed by: Diederik van Rooijen
- Written by: Hugo Heinen; Diederik van Rooijen
- Starring: Javier Guzman; Thijs Römer
- Cinematography: Lennert Hillege
- Edited by: Moek de Groot
- Music by: Bart Westerlaken
- Production companies: Waterland Film; NCRV
- Distributed by: Independent Films
- Release date: 19 February 2009
- Running time: 90 minutes
- Country: Netherlands
- Language: Dutch
- Box office: $8,027

Stella's oorlog (Dutch for Stella's war) is a 2009 Dutch drama film directed by Diederik van Rooijen.

== Cast ==
- Javier Guzman as Jurre
- Thijs Römer as Sander
- Teun Kuilboer as Twan Zwart
- Juda Goslinga as Gees
- Micha Hulshof as Dani
- Anna Drijver as Sita
- Maartje Remmers as Stella
- Keesje Rietvelt as Iris
