= Bắc Ninh (provincial city) =

Bắc Ninh City
- Provincial city (Class-1)
- Bắc Ninh City; Thành phố Bắc Ninh
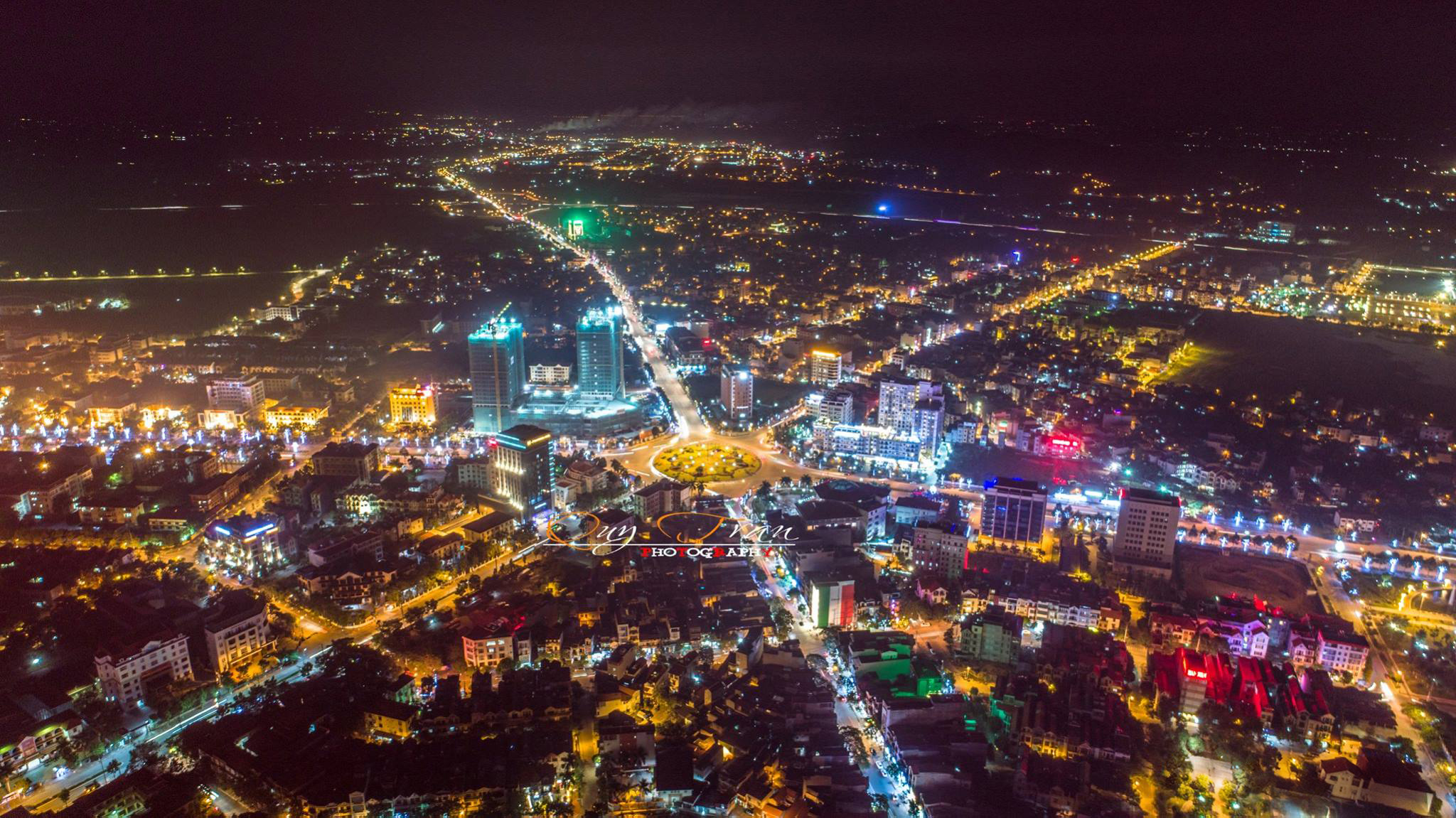
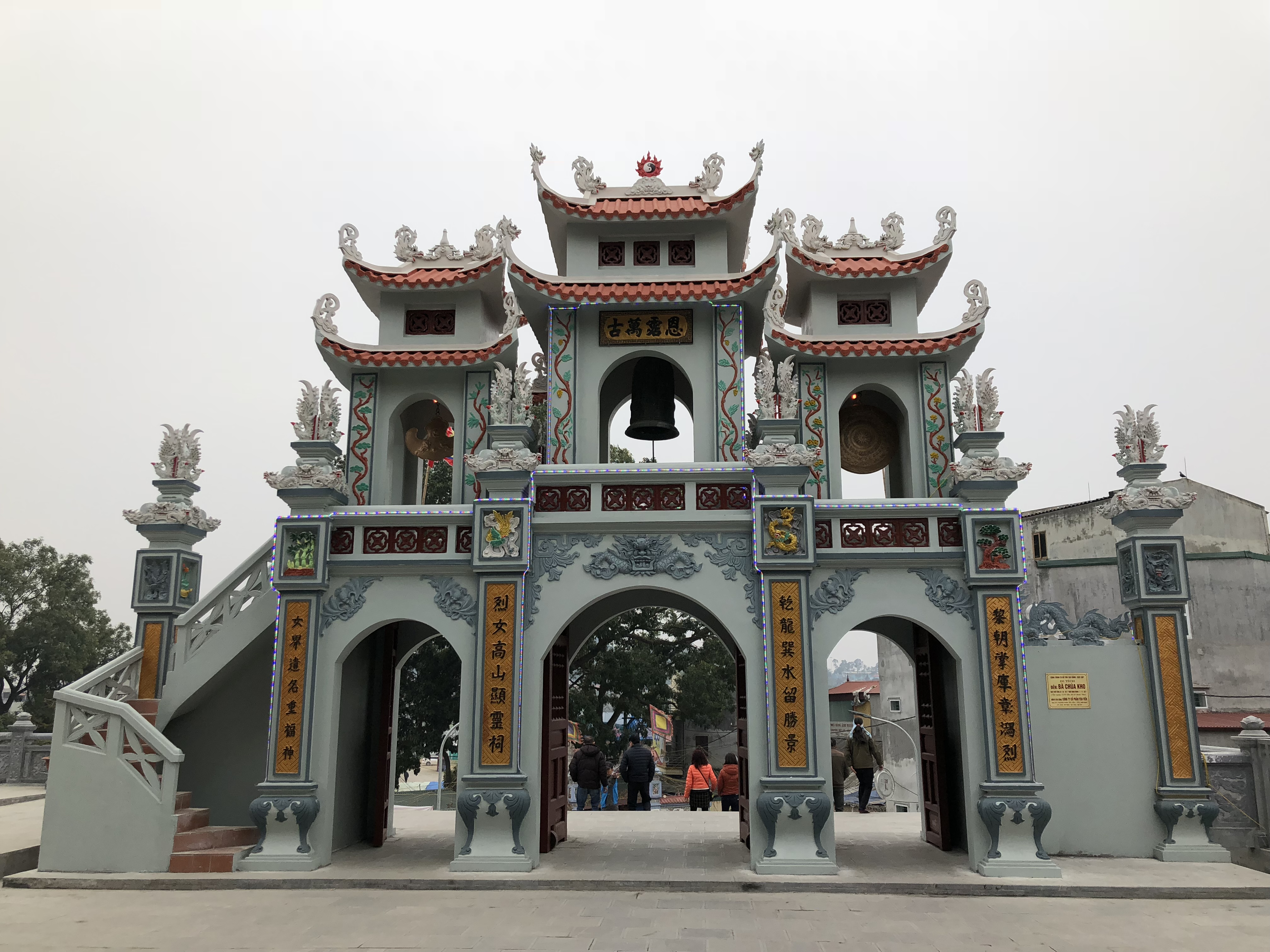
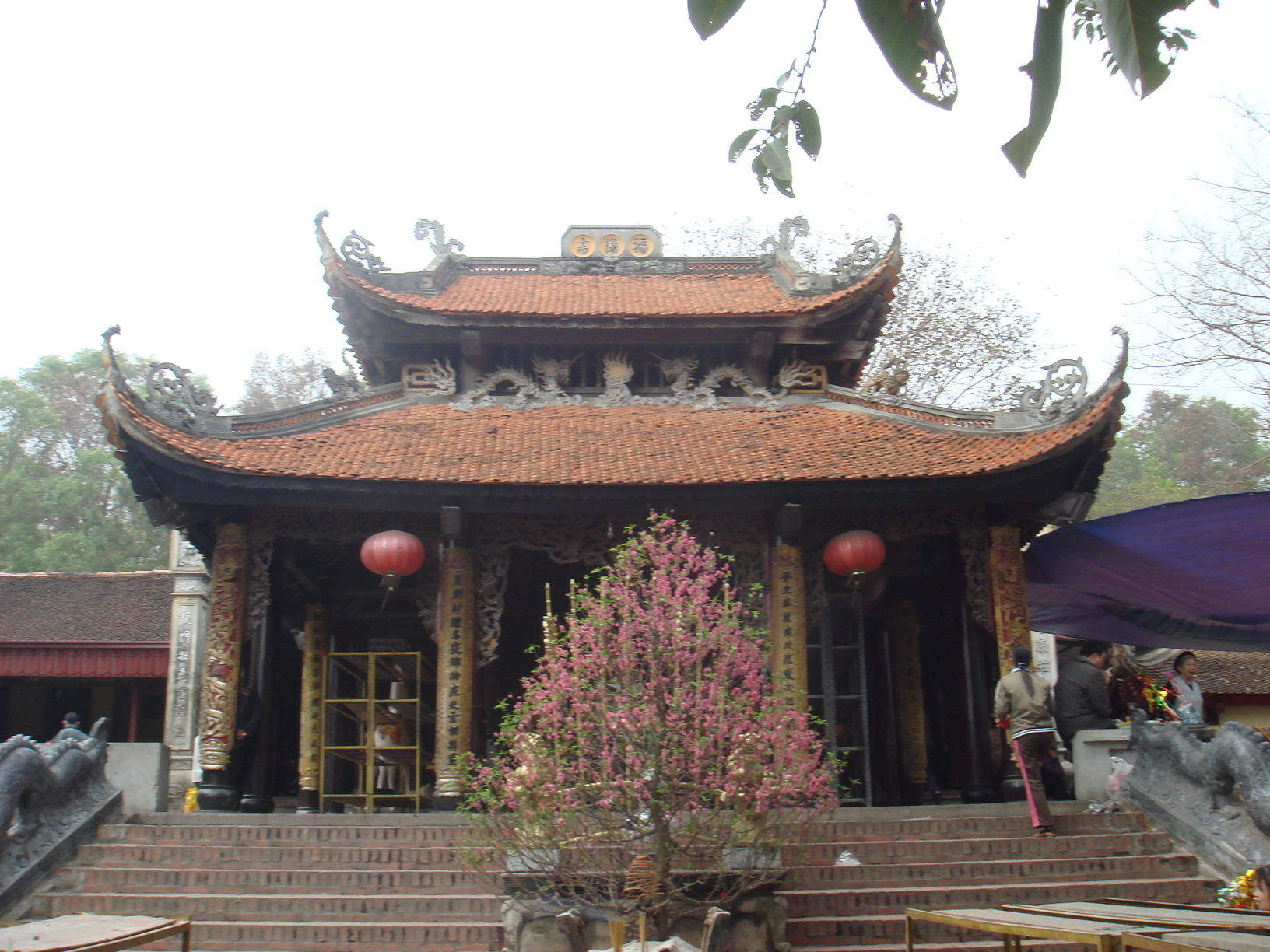
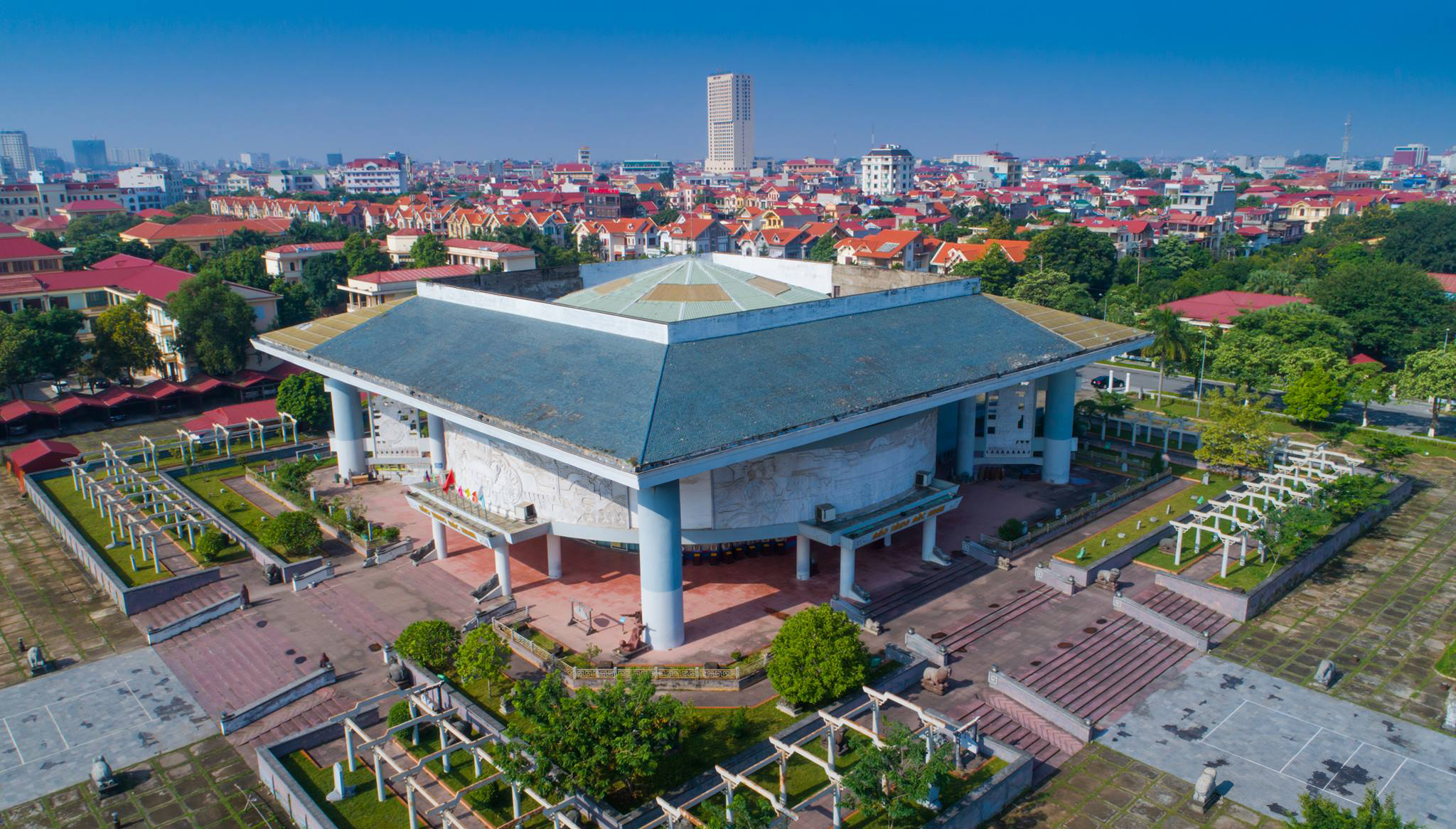
- From top to bottom, from left to right: Bac Ninh at night, three-entrance gate Bà Chúa Kho Temple, Bắc Ninh Cathedral, Bắc Ninh province library

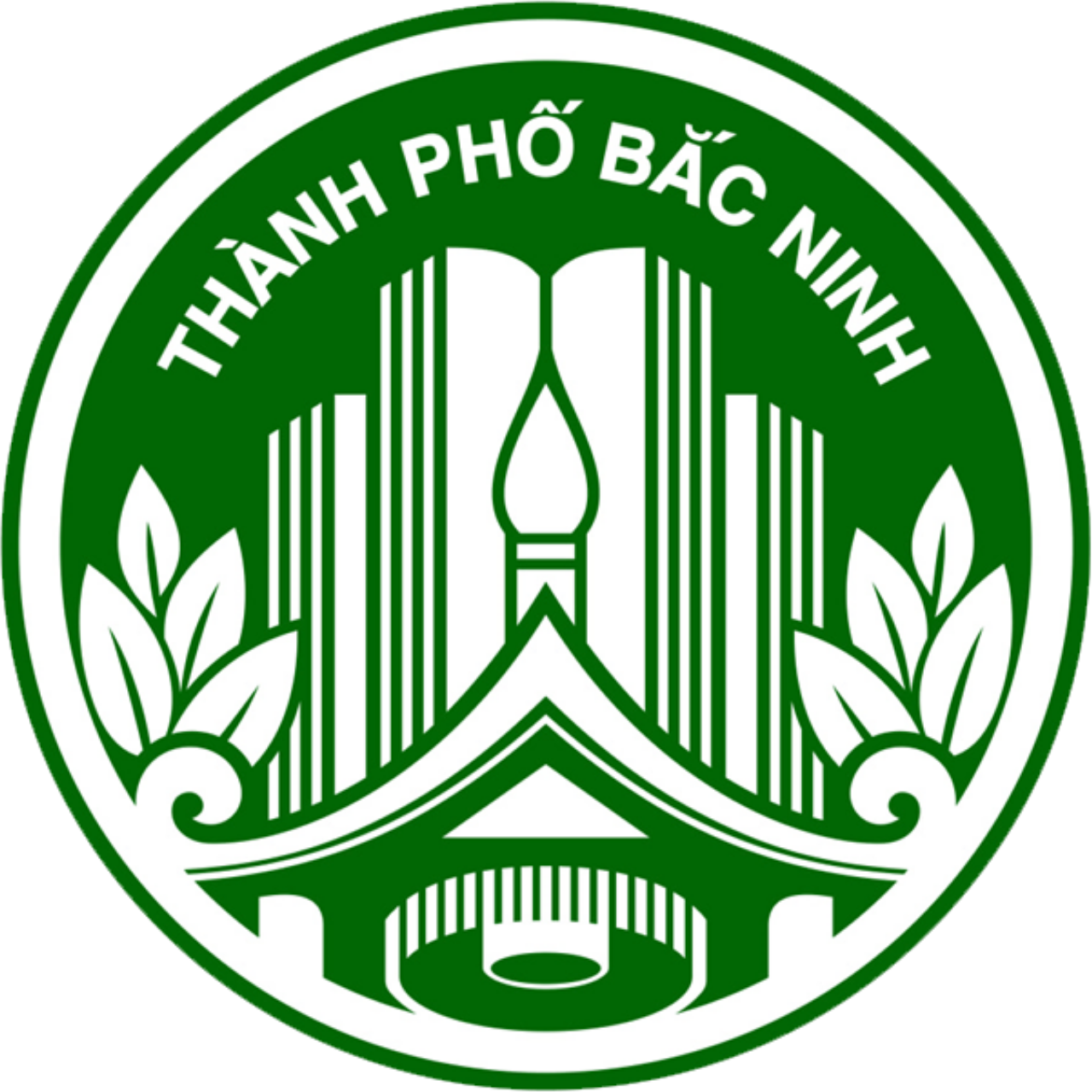
- Seal
- Interactive map of Bắc Ninh City
- Location of in Vietnam
- Coordinates: 21°11′N 106°3′E
- Country: Vietnam
- Province: Bắc Ninh

Area
  - Total: 82.60 km^{2} (31.89 sq mi)

Population (2023)
  - Total: 287,658
  - Density: 2,707/km^{2} (7,010/sq mi)
- Time zone: UTC+7 (Indochina Time)
- Climate: Cwa
- Website: http://tpbacninh.bacninh.gov.vn/

Bắc Ninh is a former provincial city and capital of Bắc Ninh province, Vietnam. The city was the cultural, administrative and commercial center of the province. The city area was 82.60 square km, with a population of 247,702 in 2019. In January 2006, the town (thị xã) of Bắc Ninh was upgraded to city (thành phố).

Bắc Ninh ceased to exist as a provincial city on 1 July 2025, following the elimination of district level units in Vietnam.

== History ==
In March 1884, Bắc Ninh was the site of a decisive campaign in the wars between France and assorted Black Flag Army forces, and the town fell to the French. Thereafter under French protectorate, the town was confirmed as the center of all political, economic, cultural offices of colonial administration in the province. The land of the Bắc Ninh Citadel, within Yên, Niem and Do Villages, was occupied by French troops. At this time Bắc Ninh became known in Europe for its lacquer work and mother-of-pearl inlaid black-wood screens, cabinets, trays, and boxes. Bắc Ninh Railway Station opened after 1904. An ambush of French troops by the Việt Minh occurred at Bắc Ninh while the 1946 Fontainebleau Conference was ongoing.

The city's name means "northern serenity."

== Buildings ==
The city is home to the Banking Academy of Vietnam, Bắc Ninh campus (Học viện Ngân hàng), the Kinh Bắc International School, and the Military Academy of Politics main campus (Học viện Chính trị Quân sự), and Bắc Ninh Railway Station. There is a shrine to Bà Chúa Kho.

== Administrative subdivisions ==
The city is administratively divided into 19 units, including 19 urban wards (phường) - Đáp Cầu, Hạp Lĩnh, Khắc Niệm, Phong Khê, Khúc Xuyên, Thị Cầu, Vũ Ninh, Suối Hoa, Tiền An, Ninh Xá, Vân Dương, Vạn An, Vệ An, Kinh Bắc, Đại Phúc, Võ Cường, Hoà Long, Kim Chân and Nam Sơn.

== Business environment ==
On Vietnam's Provincial Competitiveness Index 2023, a key tool for evaluating the business environment in Vietnam’s provinces, Bac Ninh received a score of 67.53. This was an improvement from 2022 in which the province received a score of 69.08. In 2023, the province received its highest scores on the 'Entry Costs' and 'Time Costs' criterion and lowest on 'Business Support Policy' and 'Policy Bias'.

== Notable people ==
- Tùng Dương, born 1983, singer
- Mai Duong Kieu was born here in 1987. She acts in German films and TV.
- Tôn Đức Lượng (1925–2023), painter
- Hòa Minzy, born 1995, birth name Nguyễn Thị Hoà. Famous Vietnamese singer paid homage to her hometown with her hit music video Bắc Bling in 2025.

== Gallery ==
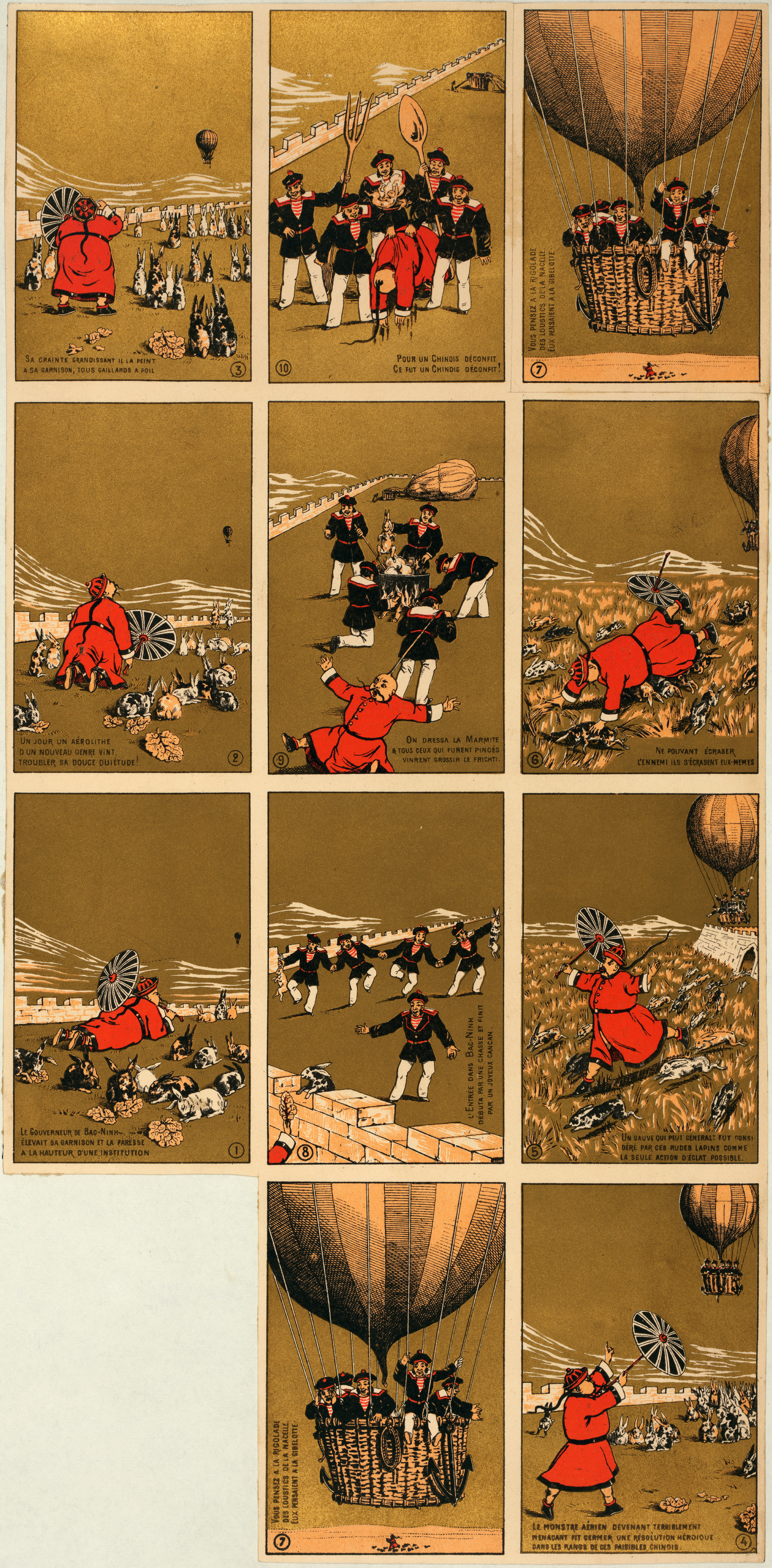
Collecting cards depicting a story about a "Chinese" governor of "Bắc Ninh", who, while relaxing on a hill with his rabbits, is frightened by an approaching balloon carrying sailors

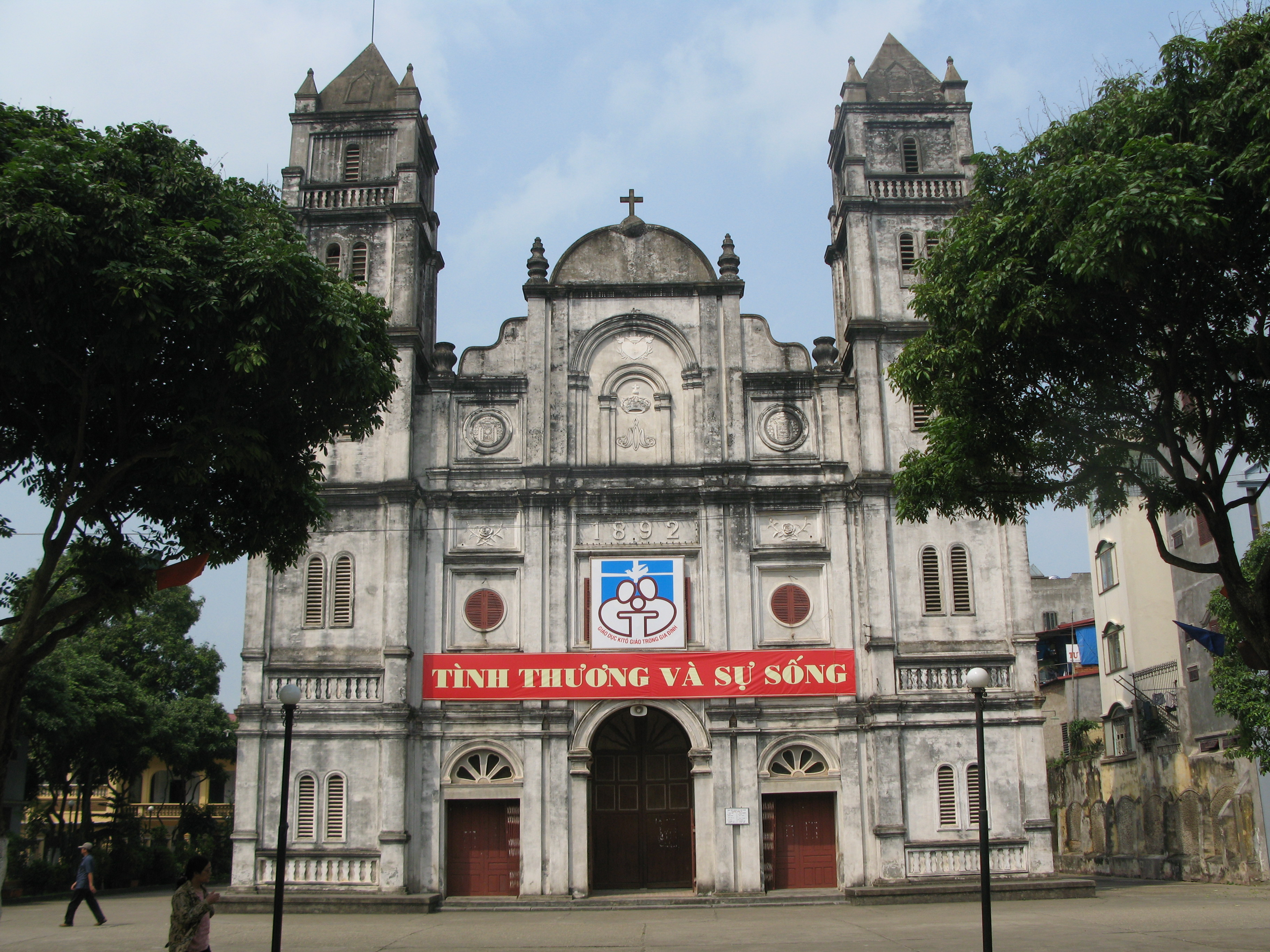
Cathedral of Bắc Ninh
