= Jochum ten Haaf =

Dutch actor (born 1978)

Jochum ten Haaf (17 December 1978) is a Dutch actor, notable for stage, film and television work including Charles II: The Power and The Passion (2003), Bad Girls (2003), Nightwatching (2007), Summer Heat (2008), Castle Amerongen (2011) and The Resistance Banker (2018).

== Career ==
Ten Haaf was born in Maastricht. He gained prominence as Vincent van Gogh in the 2002 premiere of the play Vincent in Brixton, gaining him a nomination for the Evening Standard Theatre Award for best newcomer and a Theatre World Award for the play's US run. He also argued van Gogh's case in the 2004 poll De Grootste Nederlander. From 2014 to 2015 he appeared in the London production of War Horse.

== Filmography ==
Year	Title	Role	Notes
2004	The Tulse Luper Suitcases, Part 3: From Sark to the Finish	Bouillard	
2004	Amazones	Van Trigt	
2004	06/05	Man in vergadering	
2005	Allerzielen	Kapper	(segment "van 12 hoog")
2006	Sportman van de Eeuw	Taeke	
2007	Nightwatching	Jongkind	
2008	Summer Heat	Vogelwachter	
2012	Steekspel	Wim	
2014	Accused	Pathologist	
2016	Kamp Holland	KMAR #1	
2017	Het Verlangen	Aaron Golsteijn	
2017	Dunkirk	Dutch Seaman	
2018	The Resistance Banker	Jaap Buys	
2020	The Repression	Dr. Campbell	
