= Ulrike Schweikert =

German writer

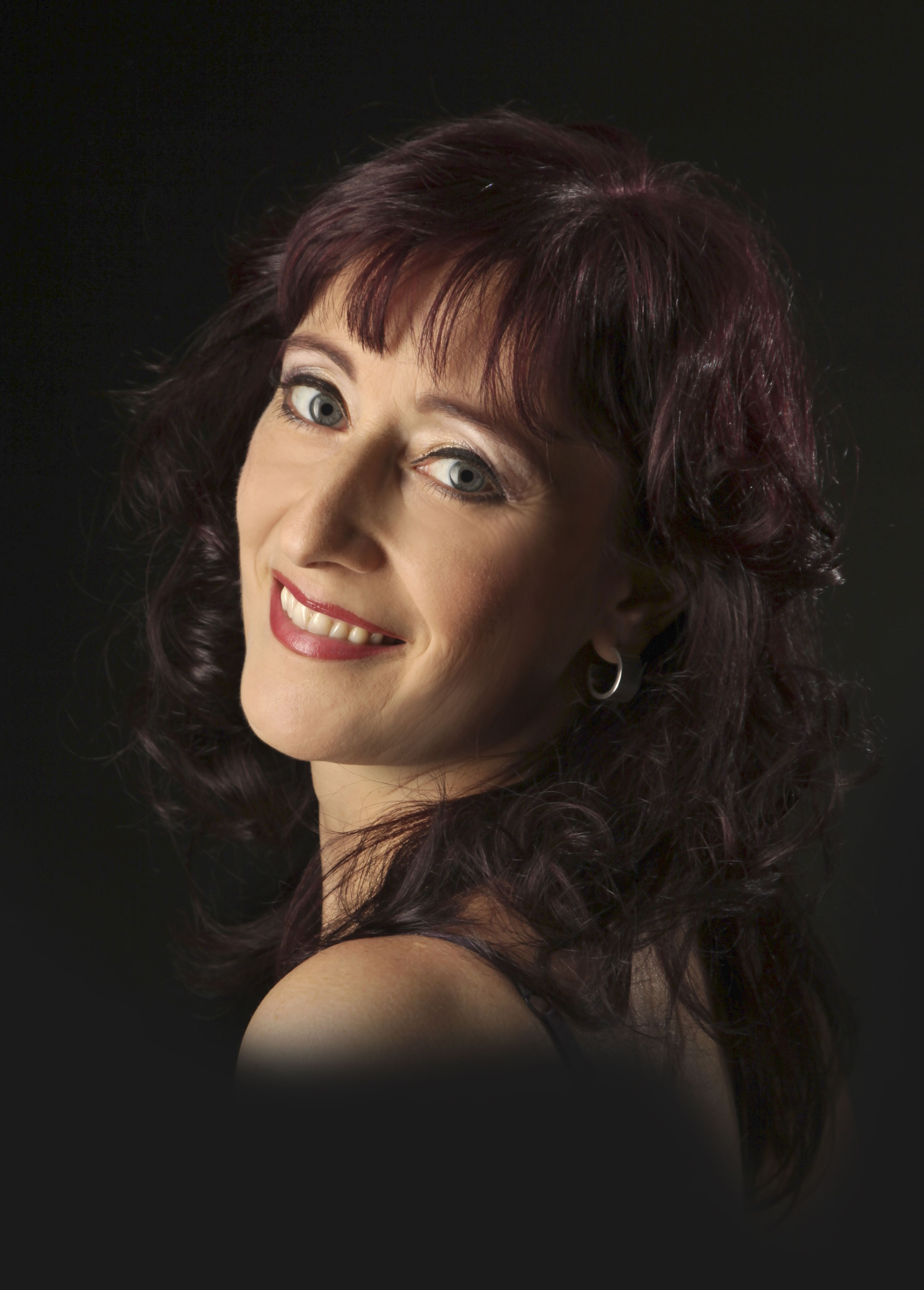
- Ulrike Schweikert (2010)
- Born: 28 November 1966 (age 58); Schwäbisch Hall, Germany

Ulrike Schweikert (born 28 November 1966) is a German writer.

Her book series Die Erben der Nacht was adapted to television as Heirs of the Night by Diederik van Rooijen and Maria von Heland.
