= Shay Mitchell =

Canadian actress (born 1987)

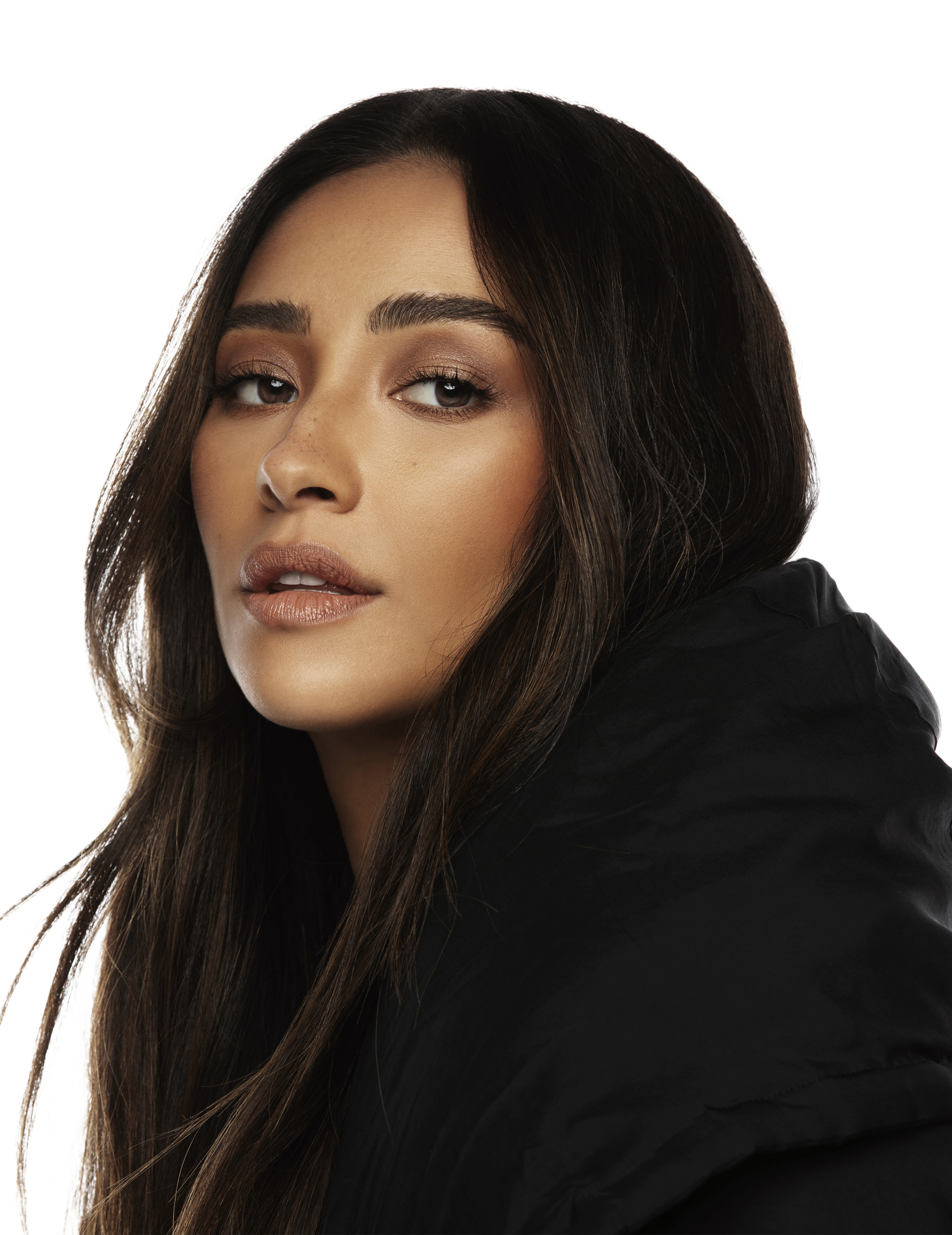
- Mitchell in 2022
- Born: Shannon Ashley Garcia Mitchell; April 10, 1987 (age 39); Mississauga, Ontario, Canada
- Occupation: Actress
- Years active: 2009–present
- Partner: Matte Babel (2017–present)
- Children: 2
- Relatives: Lea Salonga (cousin); Gerard Salonga (cousin)

Shannon Ashley Garcia "Shay" Mitchell (born April 10, 1987) is a Canadian actress. She rose to prominence for her role as Emily Fields in the mystery thriller drama series Pretty Little Liars (2010–2017), which earned her nominations for a People's Choice Award and six Teen Choice Awards. She garnered wider recognition for starring as Peach Salinger in the psychological thriller series You (2018) and as Stella Cole in the Hulu comedy series Dollface (2019–2022). She has since voiced Alexandra Trese in the Netflix animated series Trese (2021) and executive produced the crime drama series The Cleaning Lady (2022–2025).

After appearing in a series of short films, Mitchell made her feature film debut in the musical drama film Dreamland (2016). She went on to appear in the comedy film Mother's Day (2016) and Christmas film Something from Tiffany's (2022), and headline the horror film The Possession of Hannah Grace (2018).

Aside from acting, Mitchell is recognized for her fashion and business ventures. She is the founder of the travel fashion company BÉIS, the tequila brand Onda, and the production company Amore & Vita Inc. Labeled a fashion icon, Mitchell was dubbed the "Sexiest Woman Alive" by Esquire in 2014, and in 2015, appeared on the Maxim Hot 100 list. Her life, fashion choices and public appearances are subjects of widespread media coverage.

== Early life ==
Mitchell was born in Mississauga, Ontario, the daughter of Precious Garcia and Mark Mitchell. Her father is of Scottish and Irish descent. Her mother is from the province of Pampanga in the Philippines and left the country at age 19.

Mitchell's mother is a first cousin of Lea Salonga, a singer and musical theater actress. She attended Rockridge Secondary School and then later transferred to West Vancouver Secondary School where she graduated. By her late teens, Mitchell had successfully modelled for a variety of companies in cities as varied as Bangkok, Hong Kong and Barcelona, eventually returning to Toronto to study acting.

== Career ==
=== 2009–2015: Early work and Pretty Little Liars ===
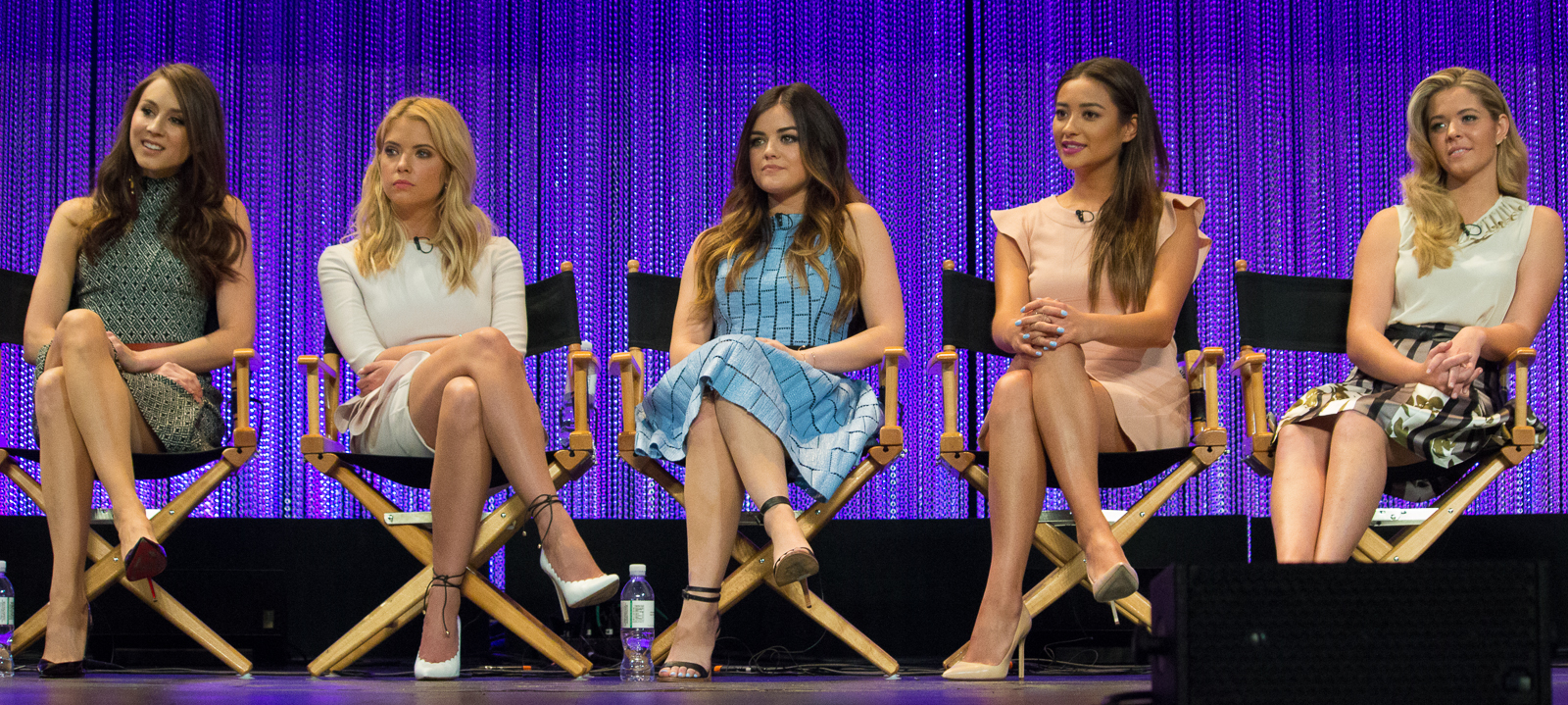
Mitchell (second from right), with her cast mates from Pretty Little Liars at Paleyfest in 2014

Mitchell began acting in 2009, making cameo appearances on the Canadian teen drama series Degrassi: The Next Generation and the police drama series Rookie Blue. Also in 2009, she appeared in the music video for "Hold My Hand" by Jamaican rapper Sean Paul.

Mitchell was cast as Emily Fields in the Freeform series Pretty Little Liars, an adaptation of the book series of the same name. She initially auditioned for the character Spencer Hastings, for which she was rejected and the part was instead given to Troian Bellisario; thereafter she tried for Emily Fields and was cast in the role. On portraying Fields, she wrote: "I think for me, it's one of the best characters that I may ever play because of the [impact] she had on so many different people. So I'm very fortunate I was able to be the one to bring Emily to life." Pretty Little Liars opened to positive reviews, and obtained a cult following. Mitchell garnered widespread recognition and praise for her performance, with many lauding the characterization she applied to the role. She earned several accolades for her acting, including winning a Young Hollywood Award in 2011, earning a nomination for a People's Choice Award and receiving six nominations from the Teen Choice Awards. The role additionally established her as a sex symbol. In 2014, she was named the "Sexiest Women Alive" by Esquire magazine, and in 2015, she was included on the Maxim Hot 100 list.

In 2010, Mitchell appeared in a four-episode arc on the Disney XD series Aaron Stone, as Irina Webber. In 2011, she signed a contract with Procter & Gamble to be the spokesperson for the Pantene Nature Fusion shampoo line. In the same year, Mitchell created a YouTube channel, where she is best known for her lifestyle-type videos. In this period, Mitchell frequently took on fewer roles to focus on Pretty Little Liars; these were mostly roles in short films. In 2015, Mitchell co-authored the young adult novel Bliss with Michaela Blaney, which is her writing debut. HelloGiggles reviewed the book, writing that "It's definitely a must-read, and we couldn't be more excited for Mitchell and Blaney."

=== 2016–present: You, Dollface, film roles and other ventures ===
In 2016, Mitchell made her feature film debut with the musical drama film Dreamland, starring as Nicole, which premiered at the Tribeca Film Festival. That same year, she headlined the comedy film Mother's Day, where she played Tina. The film was a moderate commercial success, and marked Mitchell's film breakthrough, though it was panned by critics.

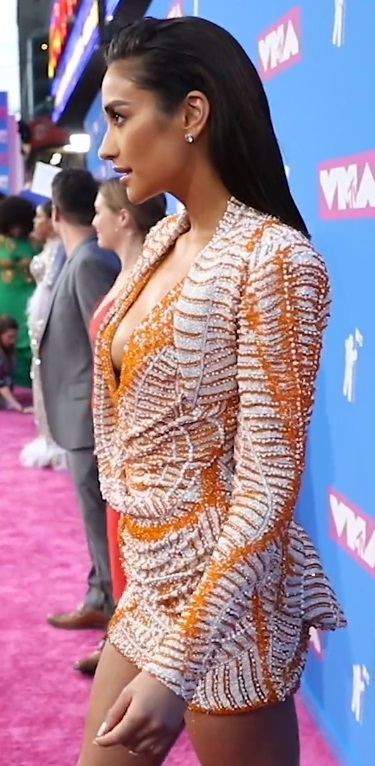
Mitchell at the MTV Video Music Awards in 2018

In 2018, Mitchell was cast in the former Lifetime television thriller series You, in the role of Peach Salinger, a wealthy and powerful socialite, which she played in the shows' first season. The series premiered in September 2018, and received critical acclaim. It earned spots in several critic year-end lists, and the performances of the ensemble cast, including Mitchell, were praised; it is her highest-rated work. Also in 2018, Mitchell founded the production company Amore & Vita Inc. and signed a contract with Warner Bros. Television. She was subsequently cast in the ABC television pilot The Heiresses, adapted from the book of the same name, which was in production until 2018, when it was announced that the show was cancelled.

Mitchell also launched her travel brand, BÉIS in 2018. The same year, the horror film The Possession of Hannah Grace was released, where Mitchell was seen as Megan Reed, a "troubled ex-cop who takes the graveyard shift in a morgue". The project was filmed years prior, and she stated that it has been one of her more difficult roles to play. She stated in an interview with Collider: "I was playing a character who was dealing with major anxiety, and to be honest with you, before this role, I hadn't really encountered anxiety in my personal life. Getting this role and being in Boston and shooting it, right after coming off of PLL, to then leading this film, there was a lot of pressure. ... I had so many panic attacks, in those first three weeks of shooting, and it was only a four-week shoot. I feel like I was truly feeling what I think that character must have been going through." Upon release, it garnered a negative reception from critics, though Mitchell's performance was praised and the film was a commercial success.

Since November 2019, Mitchell has portrayed Stella Cole in the Hulu comedy series Dollface, the best friend to Jules Wiley (Kat Dennings). The character initially drew comparisons to Mitchell's Peach Salinger on You, though she stated on the role that "Aesthetically, you can see a similarity but when you get to know Stella, she's really a wild spirit and a complete 180 from Peach. It was fun to go from that to this." Dollface is her first leading comedy role, and Mitchell, along with the acting ensemble, earned praise. She made her voice acting debut in the 2021 Netflix animated series Trese, where she provided the voice of the titular protagonist, Alexandra Trese. Since 2022, she executive produces the crime drama series The Cleaning Lady.

In November 2025, Mitchell launched Rini, a skincare brand for Gen Alpha, alongside entrepreneur Esther Song. The Korean-made line focuses on safe, science-backed formulas developed for ages three and up. The launch was met with significant backlash both online and in traditional media, and sparked conversations about the ethics of marketing skin care products to toddlers.

== Personal life ==
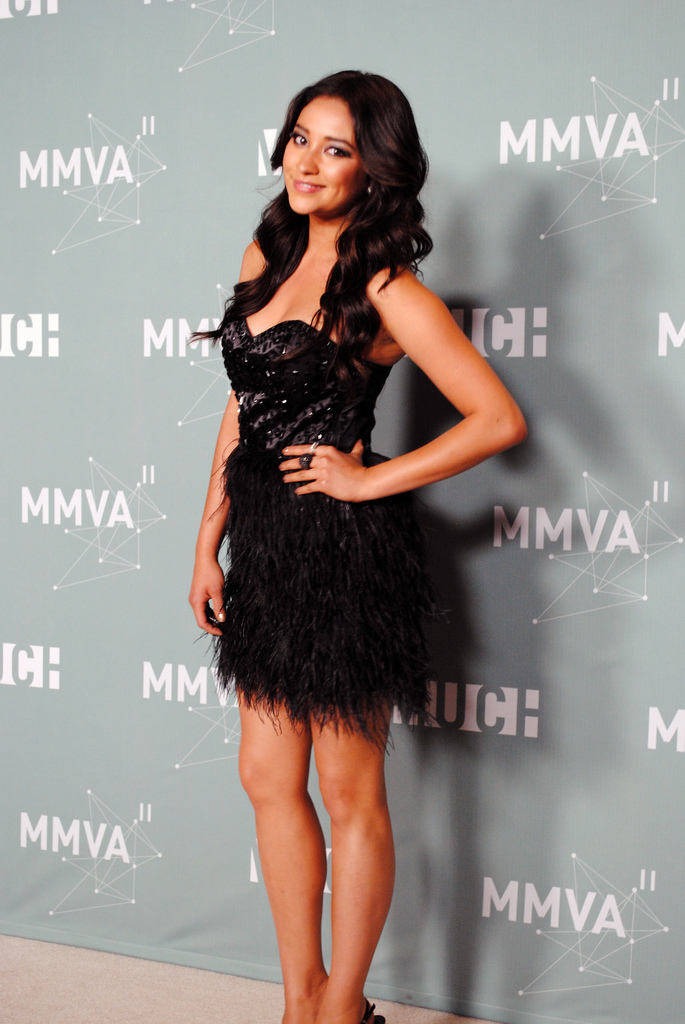
Mitchell at the 38th People's Choice Awards in 2012

Mitchell supported Somaly Mam Foundation, a non-profit organization that fought sex trafficking, until it ended operations in 2014. She has also worked with The Trevor Project alongside the Pretty Little Liars cast and the NOH8 Campaign. She works with the WE Charity, which helps communities develop educational resources, and she partnered with Represent Clothing to promote tees where half the proceeds went to GLAAD.

On her sexuality, Mitchell has stated that she prefers not to label it. In a 2017 interview with Maxim magazine, she said, "People always ask me, 'You play a gay character? Are you gay? Are you straight? Are you this? Are you that?' Look, Emily doesn't label herself, and I don't label myself either. I fall in love with the spirit of somebody. Love is love, and that's something that I'll keep saying."

Mitchell has been in a relationship with Matte Babel since 2017. They have two daughters, born in October 2019 and May 2022.

== Filmography ==
=== Film ===
Year	Title	Role	Notes
2010	Verona	Model	Short film
2012	Just Yell Fire: Campus Life	Herself	Short documentary
2014	Immediately Afterlife	Marissa	Short film
2016	Dreamland	Nicole	
2016	Mother's Day	Tina	
2016	A Trip to Unicorn Island	Herself	Documentary
2018	The Possession of Hannah Grace	Megan Reed	
2022	Something from Tiffany's	Vanessa	

=== Television ===
Year	Title	Role	Notes
2009	Degrassi: The Next Generation	Model	Episode: "Up Where We Belong"
2010–2017	Pretty Little Liars	Emily Fields	Main role
2010	Aaron Stone	Irina Webber	4 episodes
2010	Rookie Blue	Cute Girl	Episode: "Mercury Retrograde"
2012	Punk'd	Herself	Episode: "Heather Morris"
2012	Glee	Girl in Yellow Jacket	Episode: "Britney 2.0"
2015	Project Runway	Herself	Guest judge; episode: "Fashion Week: Who's In and Who's Out"
2017	Shay Mitchell: Chapters	Herself	Fullscreen Original Series; also executive producer
2018	RuPaul's Drag Race All Stars	Herself	Guest judge; episode: "Pop Art Ball"
2018	You	Peach Salinger	Main role (season 1)
2019	Almost Ready	Herself	Direct-to-streaming series; also executive producer
2019–2022	Dollface	Stella Cole	Main role
2020	We Celebrate: Class of 2020	Herself	Television special
2021	Trese	Alexandra Trese (voice)	Main role
2021	Miracle Workers: Oregon Trail	Purple	Episode: "Fording the River"
2022–2025	The Cleaning Lady	—N/a	Executive producer
2023–2024	Velma	Brenda (voice)	7 episodes

=== Music videos ===
Year	Title	Artist	Notes
2009	"Hold My Hand"	Sean Paul	
2016	"Under You"	Nick Jonas	
2017	"Help Me Help You"	Logan Paul (featuring Why Don't We)	
2018	"In My Feelings"	Drake	

== Awards and nominations ==
Year	Work	Award	Category	Result	Ref.
2011	Pretty Little Liars	Young Hollywood Awards	Cast to Watch (shared with Troian Bellisario, Lucy Hale and Ashley Benson)	Won	
2011	Pretty Little Liars	Youth Rock Award	Rockin' TV Actress	Nominated	
2014	Pretty Little Liars	Teen Choice Awards	Choice Summer TV Star – Female	Nominated	
2015	Pretty Little Liars	MTV Fandom Awards	Ship of the Year (shared with Sasha Pieterse)	Nominated	
2015	Pretty Little Liars	Teen Choice Awards	Choice TV Actress: Drama	Nominated	
2016	Pretty Little Liars	Teen Choice Awards	Choice Summer TV Star – Female	Nominated	
2016	Pretty Little Liars	People's Choice Awards	Favorite Cable TV Actress	Nominated	
2017	Pretty Little Liars	Teen Choice Awards	Choice TV Actress: Drama	Nominated	
2017	Pretty Little Liars	Teen Choice Awards	Choice TV Ship (shared with Sasha Pieterse)	Nominated	
2018	Herself	Teen Choice Awards	Choice Web Star: Fashion/Beauty	Nominated	

== Publications ==
- Bliss (October 6, 2015) (co-written with Michaela Blaney)
