= Daylight (2013 film) =

2013 film by Diederik van Rooijen

- Theatrical release poster
- Directed by: Diederik van Rooijen
- Produced by: Reinout Oerlemans; Rolf Koot; Maarten Swart
- Starring: Derek de Lint; Fedja van Huêt
- Cinematography: Lennart Hillege
- Edited by: Moek de Groot; Stanley Kolk
- Music by: Bart Westerlaken
- Production companies: Eyeworks; Inspire Pictures; NCRV
- Distributed by: Benelux Film Distributors
- Release date: 11 April 2013
- Running time: 114 minutes
- Country: Netherlands
- Language: Dutch

Daylight (Dutch: Daglicht) is a 2013 Dutch drama film based on the novel by Marion Pauw.

== Plot ==
Iris, a driven and incredibly accomplished attorney, struggles to find a balance between being a single mother and excelling in her demanding career. During a stay at her mother's place, she unexpectedly discovers a hidden family secret. It was revealed that she has a long-lost brother, whose existence was kept hidden for a long time. Ray, an individual with autism, has been confined to a detention clinic for the past two decades due to being found guilty of the horrifying killings of his neighbor and her infant daughter. Iris deeply empathizes with her brother's situation, particularly because she notices alarming resemblances between him and her own son, Aron. She attempts to clear her brother's name and sets out on a quest for the truth, only to uncover secrets much more sinister than she ever anticipated.

== Cast ==
- Derek de Lint - Twan Benschop
- Fedja van Huêt - Ray Boelens
- Monique van de Ven - Ageeth
- Maartje van de Wetering - Rosita
- Angela Schijf - Iris Boelens
- Matteo van der Grijn - Bo
- Thijs Römer - Peter Benschop
- Victor Löw - Lode
- Jaap Spijkers - Sam Dijksman

== See also ==
- Taped
