= Bollywood Hero (film) =

2009 film

- Theatrical release poster
- Directed by: Diederik van Rooijen
- Written by: Diederik van Rooijen
- Produced by: Anton Smit; Hanneke Niens
- Starring: Egbert-Jan Weeber; Ishwari Bose-Bhattacharya; Akhilesh Kumar
- Cinematography: Lennert Hillege
- Edited by: Moek de Groot
- Music by: Bart Westerlaken
- Production company: IDTV Film
- Distributed by: A-Film Distribution
- Release date: 19 March 2009
- Running time: 85 minutes
- Country: Netherlands
- Language: Dutch
- Box office: $1,850

Bollywood Hero is a 2009 Dutch drama film directed by Diederik van Rooijen set in Mumbai, starring Egbert-Jan Weeber, Ishwari Bose-Bhattacharya and Akhilesh Kumar.

The film was released on 19 March 2009 by A-Film Distribution.

== Cast ==
- Egbert Jan Weeber as Nick
- Ishwari Bose-Bhattacharya as Sita
- Kanika Dang as Sita's mother
- Vijay Kadam as Aman
- Akhilesh Kumar as Prem
- Jay Pathak as Anil
- Rubina Ali as Begging girl

== Reception ==
Bollywood Hero received mixed reviews from critics. André Waardenburg of NRC Handelsblad compared the film to Slumdog Millionaire and wrote that the film's mixture of 8mm, video, and film footage "gets artificiality lost". Belinda van de Graaf of Trouw gave the film a negative review and called it "an implausible, sad, and pretentious spectacle cobbled together from various far-fetched subplots".

=== Home media ===
The film was released on DVD on 10 September 2009 by A-Film Home Entertainment.
