= Two Eyes Staring =

- Theatrical release poster
- Directed by: Elbert van Strien
- Written by: Elbert van Strien; Paulo van Vliet
- Starring: Hadewych Minis; Barry Atsma
- Edited by: Elmer Leupen; Herman P. Koerts
- Production companies: Denver and Delilah Productions; RTL Entertainment
- Distributed by: Independent Films
- Release date: 11 March 2010
- Running time: 112 minutes
- Country: Netherlands
- Language: Dutch

Two Eyes Staring originally titled Zwart Water is a 2010 Dutch horror film directed by Elbert van Strien and co-written by van Strien and Paulo van Vliet.

== Plot ==
Christine and Paul are worried about their nine year-old daughter Lisa, a quiet and pretty girl who spends most of her time by herself. When Christine's mother dies, the family picks up and moves from Holland to Belgium to live in the big house in which Christine grew up. Lisa soon strikes up a friendship with another child that only she can see.

== Cast ==
- Hadewych Minis as Christine / Karen

== Release ==
The film was released on DVD and Blu-ray by Warner Home Video on 4 August 2010.

== Remake ==
A remake is announced to be directed by Scott Derrickson and starring Charlize Theron for Summit Entertainment.
