= Benja Bruijning =

Dutch actor (born 1983)

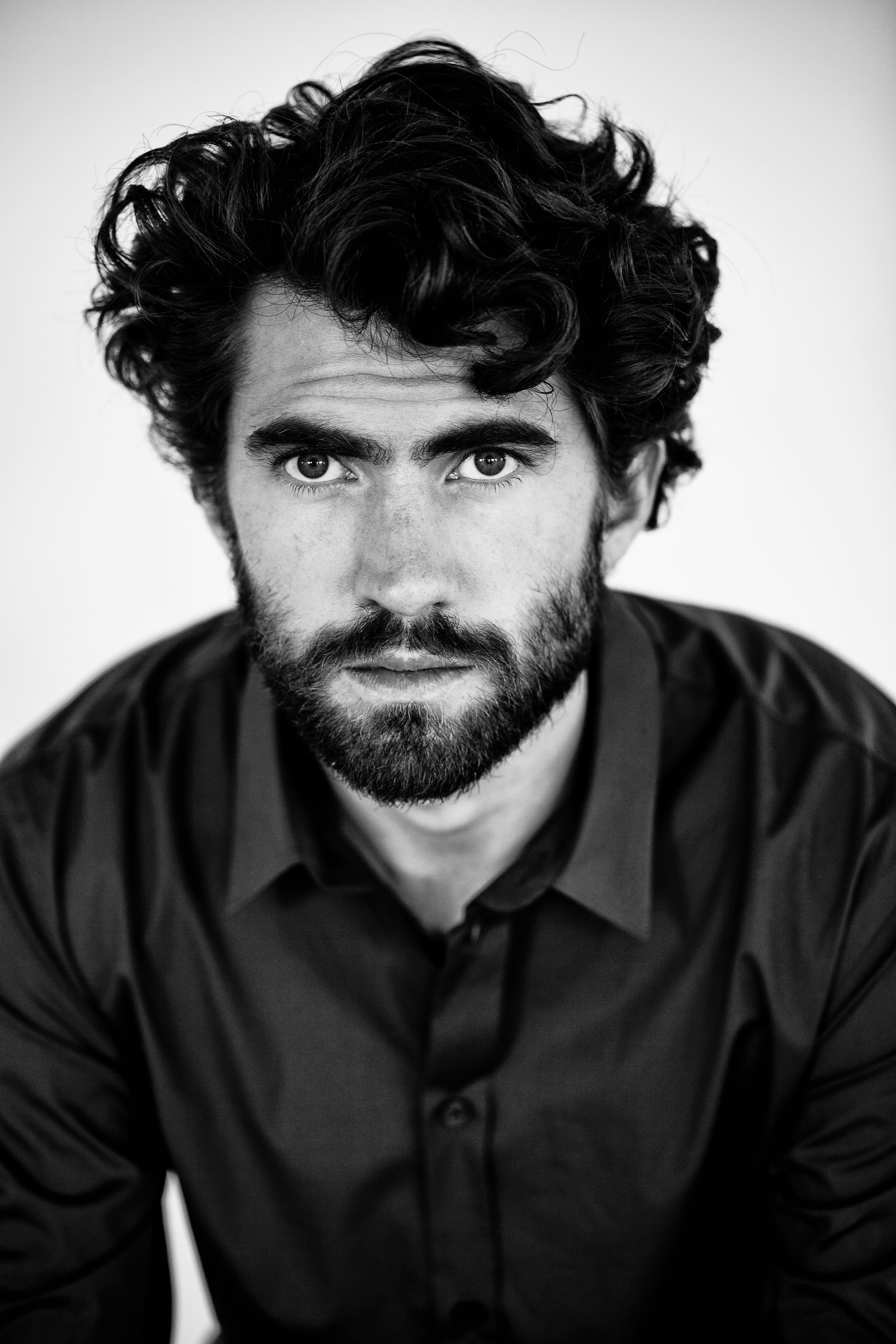
- Benja Bruijning (2014)
- Born: 28 October 1983 (age 42); Amsterdam, Netherlands
- Occupation: Actor

Benja Bruijning (born 28 October 1983) is a Dutch actor.

== Career ==
Bruijning has played roles in the television series Flikken Maastricht (2009), Kinderen geen bezwaar (2010), Heer & Meester (2014), Dokter Deen (2012 – 2016), Vechtershart (2015 – 2017) and Nieuwe buren (2018 – 2019). Bruijning also plays a role in the television series Heirs of the Night. and Dirty Lines (2022).

== Personal life ==
Bruijning is in a relationship with actress Anna Drijver. Drijver gave birth to a daughter in November 2016. Drijver gave birth to a son in November 2019.

== Selected filmography ==
=== Film ===
- 2011: The Gang of Oss
- 2012: Family Way
- 2014: Gift from the Heart
- 2016: The Fury
- 2023: Net als in de film

=== Television ===
- 2009: Flikken Maastricht
- 2010: Kinderen geen bezwaar
- 2012 – 2016: Dokter Deen
- 2014: Heer & Meester
- 2015 – 2017: Vechtershart
- 2018 – 2019: Nieuwe buren
- 2019: Heirs of the Night
- 2022: Dirty Lines
