= Barry Atsma =

Dutch actor

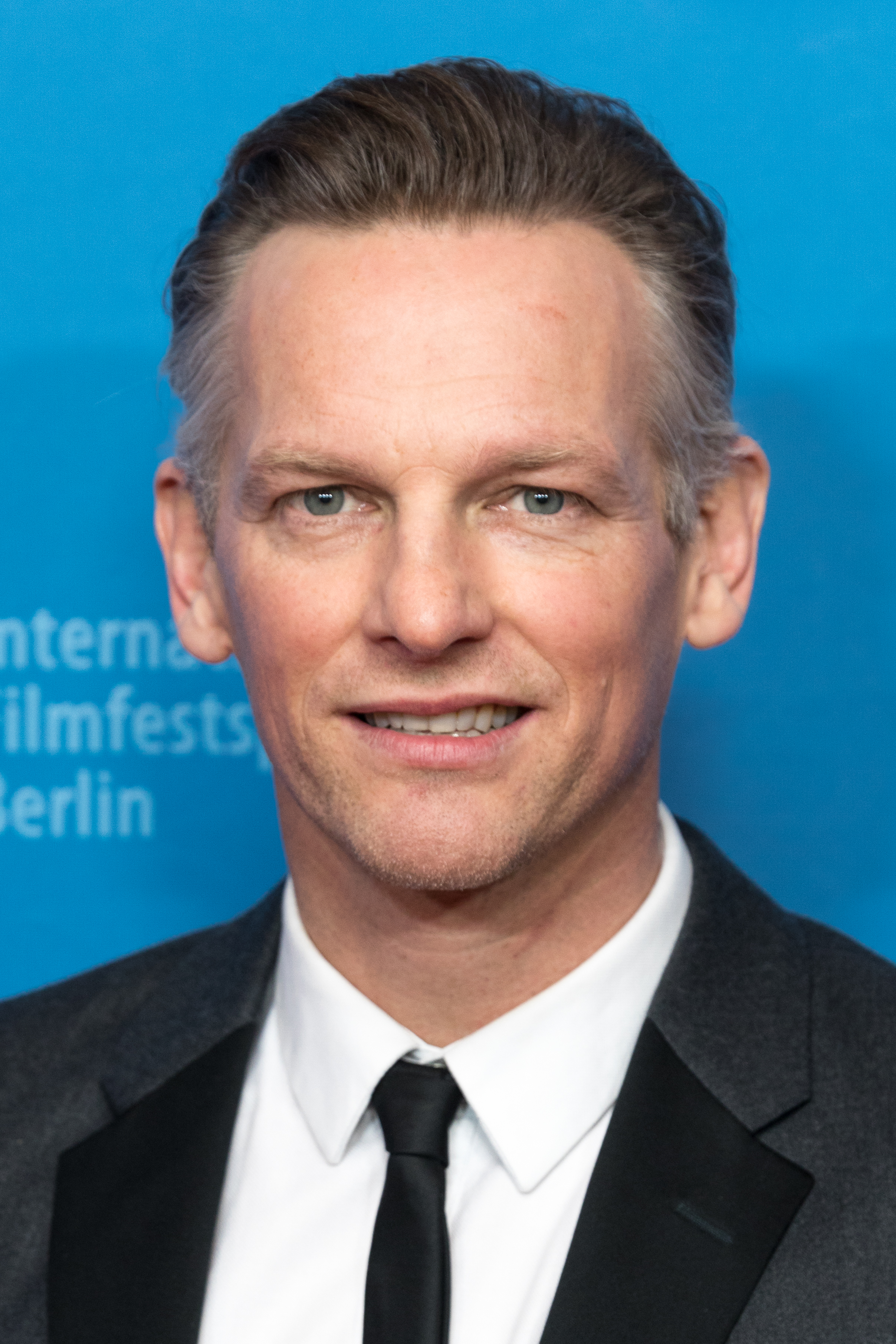
- Atsma in February 2018
- Born: 29 December 1972 (age 53); Bromley, England
- Education: Utrecht School of the Arts
- Occupation: Actor
- Years active: 1993–present
- Children: 4

Barry Atsma (born 29 December 1972) is a Dutch actor. He became known in the Netherlands through his role in the TV series Rozengeur & Wodka Lime (2001–2005) and the movie The Black Book. He is a recipient of both a Golden Calf and a Rembrandt Award. Internationally, Atsma is best known for his work on 2014 British film Hector and the Search for Happiness and the 2018 British television series The Split.

== Early life and education ==
Barry Atsma was born on 29 December 1972 in Bromley, South London. Atsma's father travelled a lot for work and, as a result, Atsma spent his childhood between England, Greece, Brazil and the Netherlands. He initially studied law but soon switched to studying drama at Utrecht School of the Arts, where he graduated in 1996.

== Personal life ==
From 1994 to 2011, Atsma was in a relationship with actress Izaira Kersten. They have two daughters together, Zoë and Charley. He is currently in a relationship with actress Noortje Herlaar, with whom he now has two daughters, Bobbi and Sam.

== Filmography ==
=== Film ===
Year	Title	Role	Notes
2002	Rita Koeling	Freddy	Short film
2003	Father's Affair		
2004	Le ciambelle	Gastheer	Short film
2004	Bos Is Back	Triple W	
2005	Lepel	Max	
2006	A Thousand Kisses	Barman	
2006	Night Run	Nijdam	
2007	Hotel Paradijs	Christiaan	Short film
2007	HannaHannaH	Wim	TV film
2008	Morrison Gets a Baby Sister	Steven Glas	
2008	One Day	Jos	TV film
2009	Amsterdam	Pedofiel	Direct-to-video
2009	The Storm	Aldo	
2009	Remains	Erik	Short film
2009	Stricken	Stijn	
2010	Two Eyes Staring	Paul	
2010	Loft	Matthias Stevens	
2012	Taped	Johan	
2012	Quiz	Leo	
2013	Miffy the Movie	Father Bunny	Voice role
2013	Mannenharten	Dennis	
2014	Kenau	Wigbold Ripperda	
2014	Accused	Jaap van Hoensbroeck	
2014	Divine Sparks	Jan	TV film
2014	Hector and the Search for Happiness	Michael	
2014	In Your Name	Ton	
2015	Michiel de Ruyter	Johan de Witt	
2015	Begierde - Mord im Zeichen des Zen	Richard Landen	TV film
2015	Zurich	Sven	
2015	Mannenharten 2	Dennis	
2016	Siv sover vilse	Bastiaan	
2016	In My Father's Garden	Hans Sievez	
2017	The Last Trace	Mark Reeve	TV film
2017	The Man with the Iron Heart	Karl Hermann Frank	
2017	The Hitman's Bodyguard	Moreno	
2018	The Resistance Banker	Walraven van Hall	
2020	Engel	Father Engel	
2021	Hitman's Wife's Bodyguard	Moreno	
2023	Klem		

=== Television ===
Year	Title	Role	Notes
1993	Bureau Kruislaan	Bob Voskuil Jr.	Episodes: "Een ijzige reputatie" & "De uitspraak"
1993	Goede tijden, slechte tijden	Philip Harinxma	Recurring role, 4 episodes
1999	Baantjer	Jelie	Episode: "De Cock en de pianomoord"
2000	Ben zo terug	Rick	Episode: "Positief denken"
2001-2005	Rozengeur & Wodka Lime	Bob Ensink	Series regular, 52 episodes
2002	Baantjer	Vincent	Episode: "De Cock en de moord in Club Exotica"
2006	Fok jou!	Frans	Miniseries
2006	De Afdeling	Anton	Episode: "A Perfect Match"
2006	Waltz	Felix Waltz	Series regular, 7 episodes
2007	Willemspark	Tenniscoach	Series regular, 8 episodes
2007	Gooische Vrouwen	Stag Hartman	Recurring role, 3 episodes
2007	De Prins en het Meisje	Prins Constantijn	Miniseries, 2 episodes
2007-2008	Voetbalvrouwen	Jeffrey Woesthoff	Series regular, 16 episodes
2011	Hart tegen Hard	Paul Smit	Series regular, 12 episodes
2011	Het gordijnpaleis van Ollie Hartmoed	Dimitri	Episode: "De vlinderworp"
2013	Van Gogh; een huis voor Vincent	Vincent van Gogh	Miniseries, 4 episodes
2014	Alles muss raus - Eine Familie rechnet ab	Oskar Etsch	Miniseries, 2 episodes
2015	Episodes	Arjen Van Der Linden	Recurring role, 2 episodes
2015	Tatau	Dries	Series regular, 7 episodes
2015	Black Widow	Maik Kneefel	Series regular, 7 episodes
2016	Het Sinterklaasjournaal	Leraar	Episode: "Series 16, Episode 12"
2017-2020	Klem	Hugo Warmond	Series regular, 30 episodes
2018-2020	Bad Banks	Gabriel Fenger	Series regular, 12 episodes
2018-2022	The Split	Christie Carmichael	Series regular, 17 episodes
2019	Tatort	Maarten Jansen	Episode: "Das Monster von Kassel"
2019	The Rook	Peter van Syoc	Recurring role, 5 episodes
2020	10 Steps to Power	Gabriël Fenger	Series regular, 10 episodes
2020	Lieve Mama	Lex van der Ven	Miniseries, 6 episodes
2021	Du sollst nicht lügen	Hendrik Voss	Miniseries, 4 episodes
2021	Blackout	Axel Kjaer	Miniseries, 4 episodes
2022	The Serpent Queen	Anne de Montmorency	Series regular, 8 episodes

== Awards and nominations ==
Year	Award	Category	Work	Result
2007	Golden Calves	Best Supporting Actor	HannaHannah	Nominated
2009	Golden and Platinum Film, Netherlands	Golden Film (with Reinout Oerlemans, Carice van Houten, Anna Drijver & Hans de Weers)	Stricken	Won
2009	Golden and Platinum Film, Netherlands	Platinum Film (with Reinout Oerlemans, Carice van Houten, Anna Drijver, Hans de Weers & Sim van Veen)	Stricken	Won
2010	Rembrandt Awards	Best Dutch Actor	Stricken	Won
2010	Rembrandt Awards	Best Dutch Actor	The Storm	Nominated
2010	Golden Calves	Best Actor	Stricken	Won
2010	Golden and Platinum Film, Netherlands	Golden Film (with Antoinette Beumer, Fedja van Huêt, Anna Drijver, Hilde De Laere, Rachel van Bommel & Sander van Meurs)	Loft	Won
2011	Rembrandt Awards	Best Dutch Actor	Loft	Nominated
2011	Golden and Platinum Film, Netherlands	Platinum Film (with Antoinette Beumer, Fedja van Huêt, Anna Drijver, Hilde De Laere, Rachel van Bommel & Sander van Meurs)	Loft	Won
2013	Gouden Notekraker	Television Gold	Van Gogh; een huis voor Vincent	Nominated
2014	Rembrandt Awards	Best Dutch Actor	Mannenharten	Won
2016	Golden Calves	Best Actor in a Television Drama	Klem	Nominated
2016	Televizier-Ring Gala	Golden Televizier-Ring (with Monic Hendrickx, Sigrid ten Napel, Stijn Taverne, Niels Gomperts, Loek Peters, Olga Zuiderhoek, Raymond Thiry, Hajo Bruins, Medina Schuurman, Gijs Naber, Jacqueline Blom, Marcel Musters, Eric Corton, Joost Koning, Peter Blok & Jacob Derwig)	Black Widow	Nominated
2018	German Screen Actors Awards	Best Leading Actor	Bad Banks	Won
2018	German Television Academy Awards	Best Leading Actor	Bad Banks	Won
2020	German Television Awards	Best Actor	Bad Banks	Nominated
2021	Bavarian TV Awards	Best Actor in a Movie Made for Television	Du sollst nicht lügen	Nominated
