= Diederik van Rooijen =

Dutch film director (born 1975)

- Born: 26 December 1975 (age 50); Netherlands
- Occupations: Film director Television director
- Years active: 2001 – present

Diederik van Rooijen (Note: Sometimes spelled as Diederik Van Rooijen.) (born 26 December 1975) is a Dutch television and film director.

== Career ==
=== Film ===
Van Rooijen graduated in 2001 from the Netherlands Film Academy with his English-language film Chalk. Chalk was also one of the graduation films of cinematographer Lennert Hillege. Van Rooijen and Hillege worked together on many films in the years that followed, including Mass (2005), De bode (2005), Bollywood Hero (2009), Stella's oorlog (2009), Taped (2012) and Daylight (Daglicht) (2013).

In 2002, he directed the film A Funeral for Mr. Smithee which follows an unnamed girl (Priscilla Knetemann) burying a dead bird. His short film Babyphoned won the NPS Award for Best Short Film at the 2002 Netherlands Film Festival.

Van Rooijen made his feature film debut with his 2003 film Zulaika. The film is the first Antillean youth film spoken entirely in Papiamento.

Van Rooijen won the UNESCO Award Prix Jeunesse for his film Genji (2006).

His 2007 film Een trui voor kip Saar was made during the 2007 Netherlands Film Festival on request of the guest of honor Burny Bos who asked to adapt his 1986 children's book of the same name.

Van Rooijen moved to Los Angeles late 2014 to work on projects in the United States. Van Rooijen made his debut in Hollywood with the 2018 horror film The Possession of Hannah Grace.

In 2019, the film Penoza: The Final Chapter concluded the story of the television series Penoza that he also directed. The film became the best visited Dutch film of 2019.

=== Television ===
He directed the Dutch television series Penoza as well as episodes of the television series Meiden van de Wit, Parels & zwijnen, Keyzer & De Boer Advocaten and Spoorloos verdwenen. The television series Penoza was adapted into the 2013 American drama series Red Widow by Melissa Rosenberg. Penoza was also adapted into the 2015 Swedish television series Gåsmamman.

Van Rooijen also directed many commercials for the Dutch supermarket chain Albert Heijn featuring Harry Piekema playing the role of a supermarket manager. Van Rooijen also made commercials for other companies and brands, such as McDonald's, KPN, Ziggo and Unox. He won a Bronze Lion award at the Cannes Film Festival in 2006 for his Volkswagen GTI commercial.

In 2019, Van Rooijen worked on the television series Heirs of the Night based on the German book series Die Erben der Nacht written by Ulrike Schweikert. The first episode aired in October 2019 and a second season aired in 2020.

He also directed the 2023 crime television series Anoniem.

== Filmography ==
=== Film ===
- 2001: Chalk
- 2002: A Funeral for Mr. Smithee
- 2002: Babyphoned
- 2003: Zulaika
- 2005: Mass
- 2005: De bode
- 2006: Dummy
- 2006: Genji
- 2007: Een trui voor kip Saar
- 2007: Het boze oog
- 2009: Bollywood Hero
- 2009: Stella's oorlog
- 2012: Taped
- 2013: Daylight (Daglicht)
- 2018: The Possession of Hannah Grace
- 2019: Penoza: The Final Chapter

=== Television ===
- 2003 – 2005: Meiden van de Wit
- 2005 – 2008: Parels & zwijnen
- 2005: Keyzer & De Boer Advocaten
- 2006: Spoorloos verdwenen
- 2008: Deadline
- 2010 – 2015: Penoza
- 2019 – 2020: Heirs of the Night
- 2023: Anoniem
