= Taped =

2012 Dutch film

- Theatrical release poster
- Directed by: Diederik van Rooijen
- Written by: Marnie Blok; Diederik van Rooijen
- Starring: Barry Atsma; Susan Visser
- Distributed by: Independent Films
- Release date: 23 February 2012 (Netherlands)
- Running time: 90 minutes
- Country: Netherlands
- Language: Dutch

Taped is a 2012 Dutch thriller film directed by Diederik van Rooijen.

The film won the Best Feature Film award at the 2012 Stony Brook Film Festival. Susan Visser was also nominated for the Golden Calf for Best Actress for her role in the film.

Visser was also nominated for the Best Actress Rembrandt Award in 2013. The film was nominated for the Best Film Rembrandt Award as well.

== Plot ==
Johan (Barry Atsma) and Saar (Susan Visser) go on holiday to Argentina and end up capturing a murder on tape perpetrated by a local police officer.
