= Joram Lürsen =

Dutch film and television director

- Born: 11 August 1963 (age 62); Amstelveen, Netherlands
- Occupations: Film and television director
- Years active: 1990-present
- Awards: Golden Calf 2008

Joram Lürsen (born 11 August 1963) is a Dutch film and television director, as well as screenwriter and producer.

Lürsen was born in Amstelveen. He graduated from the Netherlands Film and Television Academy in Amsterdam in 1990 with his film De Finales (English translation: The Finals). He directed the family film In Orange (2004), which received a Golden Film for 100,000 visitors and international awards at film festivals in Hamburg, Esfahan, Kristiansand, Los Angeles, Poznań, and Rimouski. He directed the romantic comedy film Alles is Liefde (2007), which received a Diamond Film for 1,000,000 visitors.

== Filmography ==
- De Finales (1990)
- Mijn Franse tante Gazeuse (1996)
- Stroop (1998) (TV film)
- Otje (1998) (TV series)
- In Orange (2004)
- Alles is Liefde (2007)
- Het Geheim (2010)
- Family Way (2012)
- Moordvrouw (2012-)
- Public Works (2016)
- The Resistance Banker (2018)
- Judas (TV series, 6 episodes, 2019)
- Turbulent Skies (TV series, 8 episodes, 2020)
- NOOD (TV series, 12 episodes, 2021-2022)
- Kommissar Van der Valk (TV series, 1 episode, 2022)
