= Family Way =

2012 film

- Film poster
- Dutch: Alles is familie
- Directed by: Joram Lürsen
- Written by: Kim van Kooten
- Produced by: Frans van Gestel; Arnold Heslenfeld
- Starring: Carice van Houten; Benja Bruijning; Thijs Römer
- Production company: Topkapi Films
- Distributed by: A-Film Distribution
- Release date: 21 November 2012
- Running time: 132 minutes
- Country: Netherlands
- Language: Dutch
- Box office: $9,3 million

Family Way (Dutch: Alles is familie; lit. '"Everything is Family"') is a 2012 Dutch comedy film directed by Joram Lürsen and written by Kim van Kooten and starring Carice van Houten, Benja Bruijning and Thijs Römer. It is a spiritual sequel to Alles is Liefde.

Within a week of being released in theaters, it became a Golden Film, and within a month it received a Platinum Film, for having sold at least four hundred thousand tickets. In 2013 the film received a Rembrandt award for best film, and Thijs Römer received an award for best actor for his role.

== Cast ==
- Carice van Houten as Winnie de Roover
- Benja Bruijning as Charlie de Roover
- Thijs Römer as Rutmer de Roover
- Jacob Derwig as Dick Tasman
- Martine Bijl as Jeannette de Roover
- Kees Hulst as Arend de Roover

== See also ==
- Pregnancy (for which the phrase "in the family way" is a euphemism).
