= Anna Drijver =

Dutch actress (born 1983)

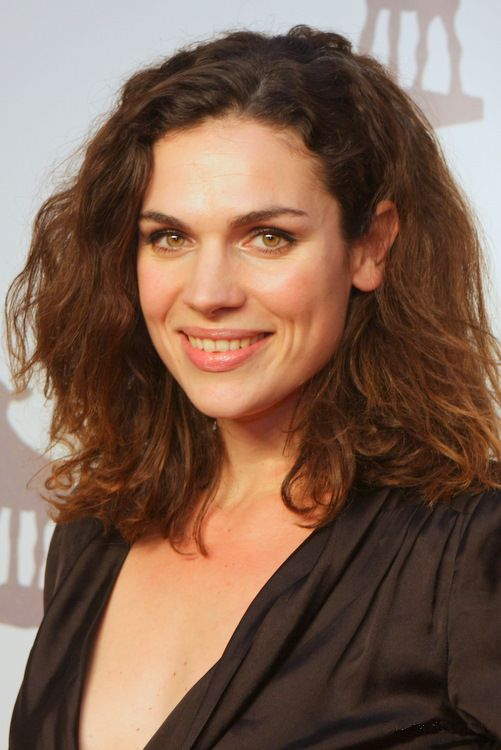
- Born: 1 October 1983 (age 42); The Hague, Netherlands
- Occupations: Model, Actress
- Years active: 2004–present
- Partner: Benja Bruijning
- Website: http://annadrijver.nl/

Anna Drijver (born 1 October 1983) is a Dutch actress and model.

== Biography ==
The Hague-born Drijver has practised classical ballet from the age of 6, and has worked as a model since she was fourteen. She appeared in the television series Goede tijden, slechte tijden, had a starring role in the BNN television series Bitches and in 2005 appeared in the films Flirt and Het Schnitzelparadijs. She graduated in 2008 from de Amsterdamse Toneel en Kleinkunst Academie.

In 2008 she played a leading role in the film Bride Flight, for which she received very favorable reviews. In the same year Anna sang the role of Aphrodite (goddess of love) in the Dutch version of the video game God of War III and did voice acting for the action-MMO game The Chronicles of Spellborn.

Since 2009 she played a role in the television series De Co-assistent. In the film Komt een vrouw bij de dokter (Love Life) (based on the novel of the same name by Raymond van de Klundert), Anna played the role of Roos, the woman with whom Stijn (Barry Atsma) cheated while his wife Carmen (Carice van Houten) was battling breast cancer. That same year she played the role of Sita in telefilm Stella's oorlog. In 2010, she appeared in the mini-television series Bellicher; de Macht van meneer Miller, playing the role of Kirsten. On the big screen she played the role of Ann Marai in the Dutch remake of the Flemish Film Loft.

Drijver is also a stage actress. She starred in Buitengewoon Binnen (director: Job Raaijmakers), in Uitgedokterd (IRPA productions, directed by Bruun Kuyt) and in 90 Minuten (directed by Ola Mafaalani). In 2010 she starred in the show Niet zo bedoeld (Theater Bellevue, direction and text by Benja Bruijning).

In 2010 Anna became an ambassador for the Ubuntu Theatre Organization. That same year, she sang Wat Doe Je Dapper with Diggy Dex. In 2011 Anna was in Wie is...de Mol?, and was eliminated in Episode 8. Later that year she was awarded de Gouden Notekraker for her roles in Levenslied and Bellicher.

In 2023, she played the character of Melissa in the highly successful Belgian-Dutch series Knokke Off.

== Personal life ==
Drijver is in a relationship with actor Benja Bruijning. They have two children, a daughter born in November 2016 and a son born in November 2019.

== Filmography ==
Year	Film	Role
2004	Love Trap	Theology Student
2005	Flirt	Student
2005	Gadjé	Sophie
2005	Impasse	Sophie
2005	Het schnitzelparadijs	Girl in Disco
2008	Bride Flight	Esther
2009	Stella's oorlog	Sita
2009	Komt Een Vrouw Bij de Dokter	Roos
2010	Loft	Ann Marai
2010	Bellicher; de Macht van meneer Miller	Kirsten Bellicher
2011	Levenslied	Betty de Waal
2011	Isabelle	Nieuwe Hoofdrolspeelster
2012	Tony 10	Wanda
2013	Freddy, leven in de brouwerij	jonge Lucille Heineken
2013	Bellicher; Cel	Kirsten Bellicher
2013	Smoorverliefd	Barbara
2013	Der zweite Mann	Rebecca Martens
2014	Heer & Meester	Daphne van Cleef
2019	Undercover	Kim de Rooij/Anouk

== Book ==
Year	Title	Publisher	ISBN
2010	Je Blijft (You Stay)	Lebowski Achievers	ISBN 9789048807178
