= René Mioch =

Dutch journalist and presenter

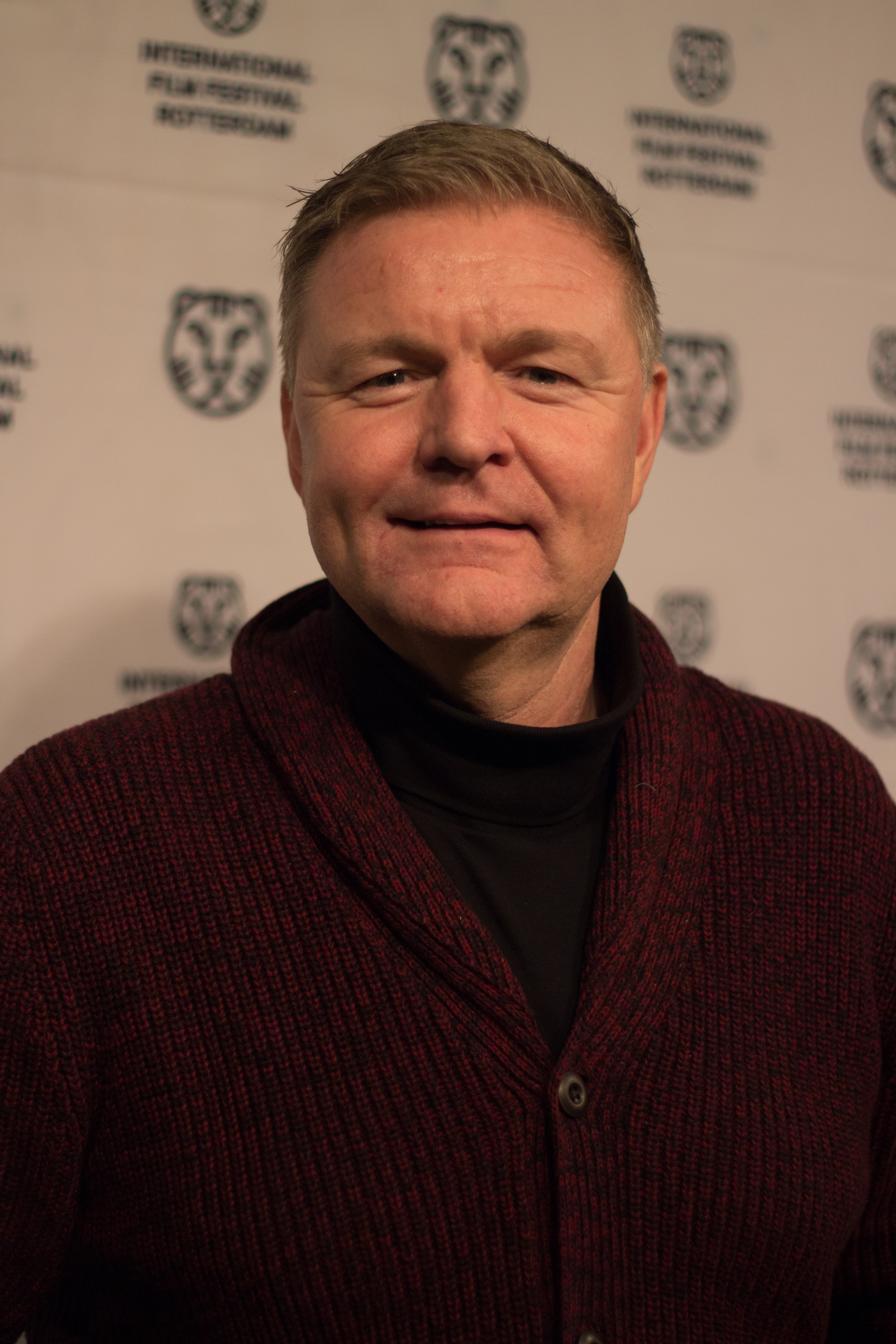
René Mioch at the International Film Festival Rotterdam in 2016

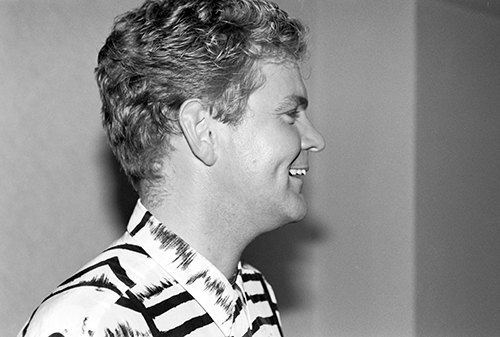
René Mioch in 1992

René Mioch (born March 6, 1959) is a Dutch journalist and presenter for radio and television. He has had several minor film roles, mainly as cameos of himself, including appearances in Loverboy and Too Fat Too Furious. In 2006, he was elected as a member of the International Academy of Television Arts and Sciences.

== External sources ==
- René Mioch at IMDb
