= Loft (2010 film) =

- Theatrical release poster
- Directed by: Antoinette Beumer
- Produced by: Hilde De Laere; Rachel van Bommel; Sander van Meurs
- Starring: Fedja van Huêt; Barry Atsma
- Cinematography: Danny Elsen
- Music by: Wolfram de Marco
- Production companies: Woestijnvis; Millstreet Films; Pupkin Film; BNN
- Distributed by: Independent Films
- Release date: 16 December 2010
- Running time: 108 minutes
- Country: Netherlands
- Language: Dutch
- Box office: $4,956,709

Loft is a 2010 Dutch crime film directed by Antoinette Beumer. It is a remake of the 2008 Belgian film Loft.

The film sold 445,000 tickets in the Netherlands. Beumer said of it, "het gaat over vertrouwen, over hoe goed je elkaar kent" ("it is about trust, how well you know each other").

The remake has been described as "a clear-cut case of adaptational nationalism", as "the film's original incarnation would have been perfectly comprehensible in The Netherlands".

== Cast ==
- Fedja van Huêt - Bart Fenneker
- Barry Atsma - Matthias Stevens
- Jeroen van Koningsbrugge - Willem van Eijk
- Gijs Naber - Robert Hartman
- Marwan Kenzari - Tom Fenneker
- Anna Drijver - Ann Marai
- Sallie Harmsen - Sarah Lunter
- Kim van Kooten - Nathalie Stevens
- Lies Visschedijk - Annette van Eijk
- Hadewych Minis - Eva Fenneker
- Katja Herbers - Marjolein Hartman
- Carolien Spoor - Kimmy Fenneker-de Nijs
- Charlie Chan Dagelet - Linda Fenneker
- Renée Fokker - Vrouwelijke ondervrager
- Dan Trettel - Cashier
