= Stroop =

Stroop is a Dutch surname. Notable people with the name include:

- John Ridley Stroop (1897–1973), American psychologist, after whom the Stroop effect was named
- Jürgen Stroop (1895–1952), German SS commander responsible for the liquidation of the Warsaw Ghetto; executed for war crimes
- Paul D. Stroop (1904–1995), officer of the United States Navy and a naval aviator

== See also ==
- Stroup (disambiguation)
