= Bắc Ninh station =

Railway station in Bắc Ninh, Vietnam

Bac Ninh Ga Bắc Ninh

General information
- Location: Bắc Ninh; Vietnam
- Coordinates: 21°10′42″N 106°03′22″E
- Line: Hanoi–Đồng Đăng Railway
Location

Bắc Ninh station is a mainline station of the North–South railway, an important centre of the railways of Vietnam. It serves the city of Bắc Ninh.

The Bắc Ninh railway station, first encountered at the age of seven, is a recurring scene in the autobiography of Marcel Van.
