= Love Is All (2007 film) =

2007 film

- Theatrical release poster
- Directed by: Joram Lürsen
- Written by: Kim van Kooten
- Produced by: Jeroen Beker; Frans van Gestel
- Starring: Carice van Houten; Paul de Leeuw; Wendy van Dijk; Daan Schuurmans; Chantal Janzen
- Cinematography: Lex Brand
- Edited by: Peter Alderliesten
- Music by: Melcher Meirmans; Merlijn Snitker; Chrisnanne Wiegel
- Production companies: Motel Films; Fu Works; VARA Television
- Distributed by: A-Film Distribution
- Release date: 11 October 2007
- Running time: 110 minutes
- Country: Netherlands
- Language: Dutch
- Budget: €4 million
- Box office: $14,724,768

Love Is All (Dutch: Alles is Liefde) is a 2007 Dutch romantic comedy film directed by Joram Lürsen and written by Kim van Kooten and starring Carice van Houten, Paul de Leeuw, Wendy van Dijk, and Daan Schuurmans. The movie is loosely inspired by the British Christmas movie Love Actually.

== Plot ==
The actor who annually plays Sinterklaas dies just before the arrival of the television crew. A mysterious new Sinterklaas named Jan (Michiel Romeyn) replaces him. Shortly after his public appearance, he rescues a child who fell into a canal but runs away when people realize what happened and begin crowding around. He is found by the production assistant of the television show the next day and agrees to appear in television shows when he is informed that playing Sinterklaas is a paying job. He becomes quite popular on television because of his alternative style.

Klaasje (Wendy van Dijk) has left her husband Dennis (Peter Paul Muller) because he cheated on her with a young and attractive elementary school teacher (Chantal Janzen). Dennis wants her back, but his chances seem to plummet when she has a fling with a 16-year-old boy (Valerio Zeno), whom she meets at her father's funeral (her father was the previous "Sinterklaas" actor).

Klaasje's best friend Simone (Anneke Blok), the mother of the girl rescued by Sinterklaas, is the linchpin in her family. Her husband Ted (Thomas Acda) often feels redundant. He loses his job, but he is afraid to tell his domineering wife.

Swimming instructor Victor (Paul de Leeuw) looks forward to marrying his love Kees (Daan Schuurmans), an undertaker. But Kees has doubts and fears about committed life. During the marriage ceremony, he walks away without saying ‘yes’.

Victor's sister Kiki (Carice van Houten), a saleswoman at the jewelry section of De Bijenkorf, has always dreamt of a Prince Charming. During the arrival of Sinterklaas, Kiki almost runs into Crown Prince Valentine (Jeroen Spitzenberger), while driving a horse carriage. Kiki is dressed as a campaign gift and the prince takes her in his arms as she tries to get down from the carriage. Prince Valentine falls in love with her. The next morning, he visits De Bijenkorf to see Kiki. But Kiki desists from seeing him and rejects him on the grounds that he will not take her seriously. To still come into contact with her, Prince Valentine dresses as Black Peter, and does antics at De Bijenkorf for work. In the evening, he (dressed as Black Pieter) offers to drop her home and ends up having a wild night with her. The next morning, however, he sneaks away through the window without saying goodbye to Kiki. Kiki follows him to his hotel and confronts him. It turns out that Kiki knew all along that Prince Valentine was playing Black Pieter but just wanted to see how far he would go for her. They end up kissing each other.

On the night of Sinterklaas Eve, Jan again runs away before his appearance in the show. He is spotted by Ted who recognizes him to be his child's rescuer. Ted invites Jan, dressed as Sinterklaas, to his house for a beer. The neighborhood children gradually flock to his house, as word spreads of Jan's presence. The television crew also eventually comes there. During his TV interview, he speaks candidly about his life and his regrets. He also says that his son's name is Kees and that he abandoned his family when his son was three years old. The 5 December Special TV show comes to an end and Sinterklaas is seen walking out onto the snowy street. As he walks and looks around, all the couples are shown one by one to have found out what to do with their lives. Having found his father on the television show, Kees drives with Victor to meet him. They come across him in the middle of the road as they drive. The movie ends with Jan, dressed as Sinterklaas, embracing Kees.

== Cast ==
- Carice van Houten as Kiki Jollema
- Paul de Leeuw as Victor Jollema
- Michiel Romeyn as Sinterklaas Jan
- Wendy van Dijk as Klaasje van Ophorst
- Thomas Acda as Ted Coelman
- Daan Schuurmans as Kees Tromp
- Lies Visschedijk as Alicia
- Anneke Blok as Simone Coelman
- Peter Paul Muller as Dennis
- Chantal Janzen as Sarah
- Jeroen Spitzenberger as Prince Valentijn
- Marc-Marie Huijbregts as Rudolf
- Valerio Zeno as Daniël

== Production ==
The story is inspired by the film Love Actually (2003). The budget of Alles is Liefde was 4 million euros.

== Box office ==
Alles is Liefde had a box office take of €9.1 million in 2007. Within two months after its release it received a Golden Film award for 100,000 visitors, a Platinum Film award for 400,000 visitors, and a Diamond Film for 1,000,000 visitors, all in the Netherlands.

In 2007, it was the most viewed Dutch film in cinemas, and overall the third most viewed film in Dutch cinemas, coming after Harry Potter and the Order of the Phoenix and Pirates of the Caribbean: At World's End.

Alles is Liefde is the most visited Dutch romantic comedy film ever, and is in the top 20 of most visited Dutch films of all time.

== Sequel ==
A spiritual sequel to the film, Family Way, starring van Houten in a different role, was released in 2012.
