= Stricken (2009 film) =

- Theatrical release poster
- Directed by: Reinout Oerlemans
- Produced by: Reinout Oerlemans
- Starring: Barry Atsma; Carice van Houten
- Production companies: Eyeworks; Inspire Pictures; RTL Entertainment
- Distributed by: Benelux Film Distributors
- Release date: 26 November 2009
- Running time: 105 minutes
- Country: Netherlands
- Language: Dutch
- Box office: €9.3 million (Netherlands)

Stricken (Dutch: Komt een vrouw bij de dokter) is a 2009 Dutch drama film directed and produced by Reinout Oerlemans and based on the book by the same name by writer Ray Kluun. The film was the highest-grossing Dutch film of the year with a gross of €9.3 million and is one of the 20 most popular Dutch films of all time.

== Plot ==
Stijn (Barry Atsma) is a rich, handsome, and self-centered advertising executive who lives in a hedonistic world. Everything revolves around him. He has a successful career and a loving marriage with Carmen (Carice van Houten). Occasionally he cheats, but it is tolerated due to his enthusiastic and impetuous character. Fate strikes as it turns out that Carmen is suffering from breast cancer. He supports her, but as it can sometimes be difficult, he will often go between meeting with Roos (Anna Drijver), with whom he has a tempestuous affair, and lying to Carmen. After Carmen is declared cured, Stijn comes clean with his cheating and breaks up with Roos. Afterwards, Carmen becomes sick again, this time terminally ill. Stijn breaks his promise to Carmen and resumes his relationship with Roos, although Carmen forgives him. She commits physician-assisted suicide by drinking a poison provided by a physician (Sacha Bulthuis). This does not work, so she then gets an injection from the doctor and finally dies. After the death of Carmen, Stijn goes even further in his relationship with Roos.

== Cast ==
- Barry Atsma - Stijn
- Carice van Houten - Carmen
- Anna Drijver - Roos
- Pierre Bokma - Family doctor
- Sacha Bulthuis - Oncologist

== Production ==
Anna Drijver found it difficult to combine a blossoming relationship with the racy scenes in the film: “It's still weird. That I was kissing and having sex with Barry (Atsma) all day long for the film and then got a sweet text message from my boyfriend in the evening. Messing around on set during the day, when I had barely kissed my boyfriend at the time.”
