= The Price of Sugar =

The Price of Sugar may refer to:

- The Price of Sugar (2007 film), documentary
- The Price of Sugar (2013 film), Dutch film
