= Cinema of Suriname =

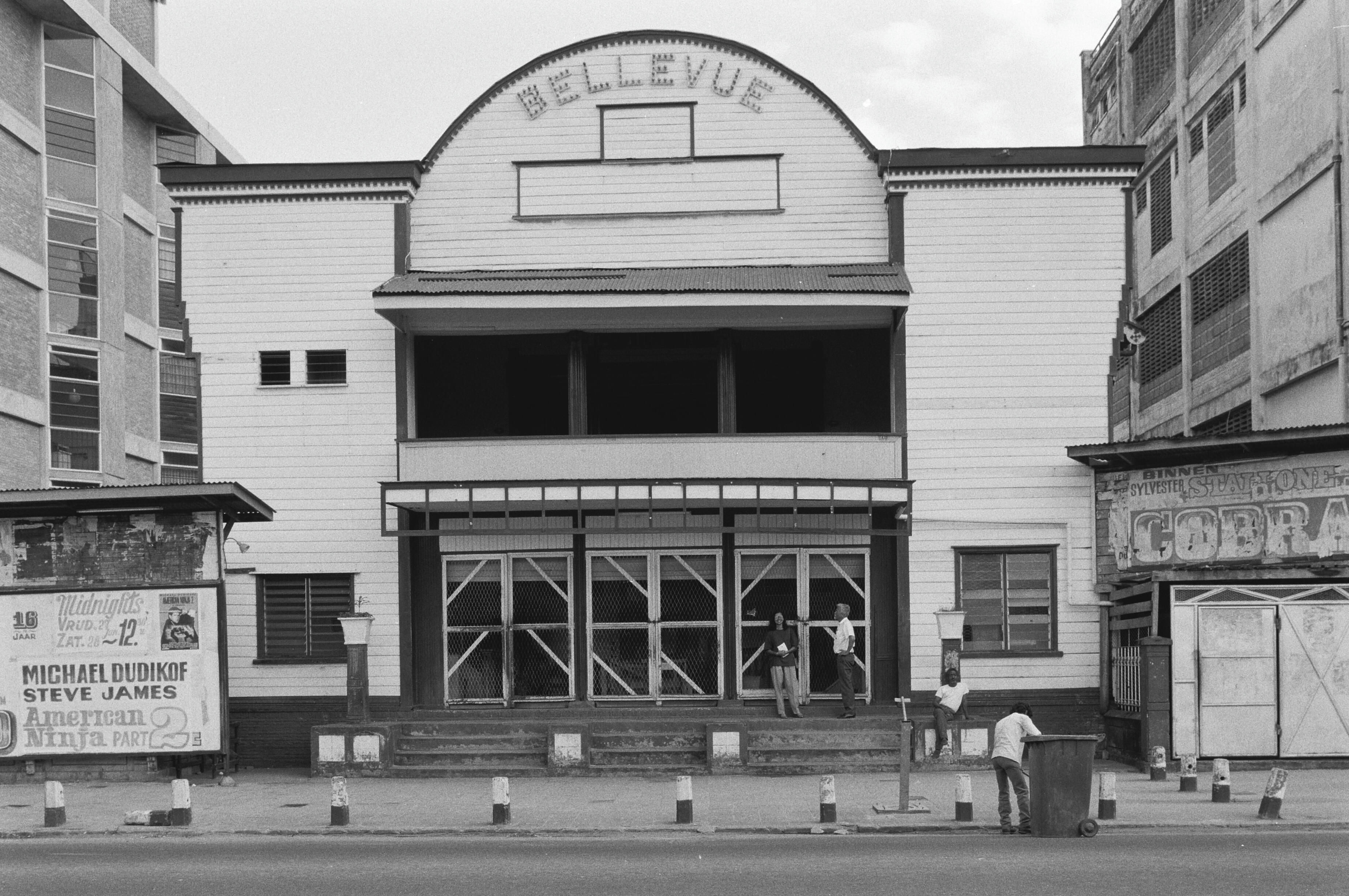
Bellevue in Paramaribo (1989)

The Cinema of Suriname is part of the Surinamese culture. National cinema, as a kind of artistic creativity, was born in the second half of the 70s of the 20th century.

The first full-length film in Suriname was, shot in 1976, the joint Dutch-Surinamese film "Wan Pipel" (one people) directed by Pim de la Parra. In 1996, De la Parra, who returned from the Netherlands, founded the Suriname Film Academy (Cinema Institute in Paramaribo). Since March 2005, with the support of the Government of the Netherlands and private donors from the Netherlands, the Suriname Film Academy has been providing screenwriting, cinematography, sound engineering and director/producer courses. The emphasis at the academy is on training in the production of low-budget films.

In the 1950s, the share of American cinema in the cinemas of Suriname was 77%, 11% was the share of Indian cinema, the rest was the share of European film production. There was no national cinema during the colonial period. The Dutch government showed no interest in its development. However, even after the declaration of independence in 1975, the situation did not change. The Cinema of Suriname has not received and to this day does not receive financial support from the state. Thus, due to the economic crisis in the 1990s, all cinemas in the country were closed.

Since the beginning of the 21st century, a few enthusiastic filmmakers from local natives have begun a gradual restoration of the structures of the national film industry. To this end, in 2002, director Eddie Weingard and his wife Hennach Dreibar founded The Back Lot Foundation. Every year, on December 6-11, in the building of the Thalia Theatre in Paramaribo, the Foundation hosts screenings of festival feature and documentary films. The Back Lot Foundation is financially supported by the Dutch Ministry of Foreign Affairs and the Prince Claus Fund.

In 2003, the first Surinamese film for children "Sjommie" was filmed. In 2007, another Surinamese film by De la Parra, "Het geheim van de Saramacca rivier" (the secret of the Saramacca River), was released. The film critics' award at the International Film Festival Rotterdam in 2010 was given to the film by American director Ben Russell "Let Each One Go Where He May", filmed by him in 2009 in Suriname, where he worked in the Peace Corps. In 2013, The Price of Sugar directed by Jean van de Velde was released. The story which was loosely based on the novel by Cynthia McLeod is about two half-sisters. One sister is a Caucasian planter's daughter, the other is a Creole slave.

== Bibliography ==
- Rist, P. H. (2014). Historical Dictionary of South American Cinema. Historical Dictionaries of Literature and the Arts. Lanham, Maryland: Rowman and Littlefield. ISBN 978-0810880368.
- Marchetti, S. (2014). Black Girls: Migrant Domestic Workers and Colonial Legacies. Studies in Global Migration History. Leiden: BRILL. ISBN 978-9004276932.
