= Ariane Schluter =

Dutch actress (born 1966)

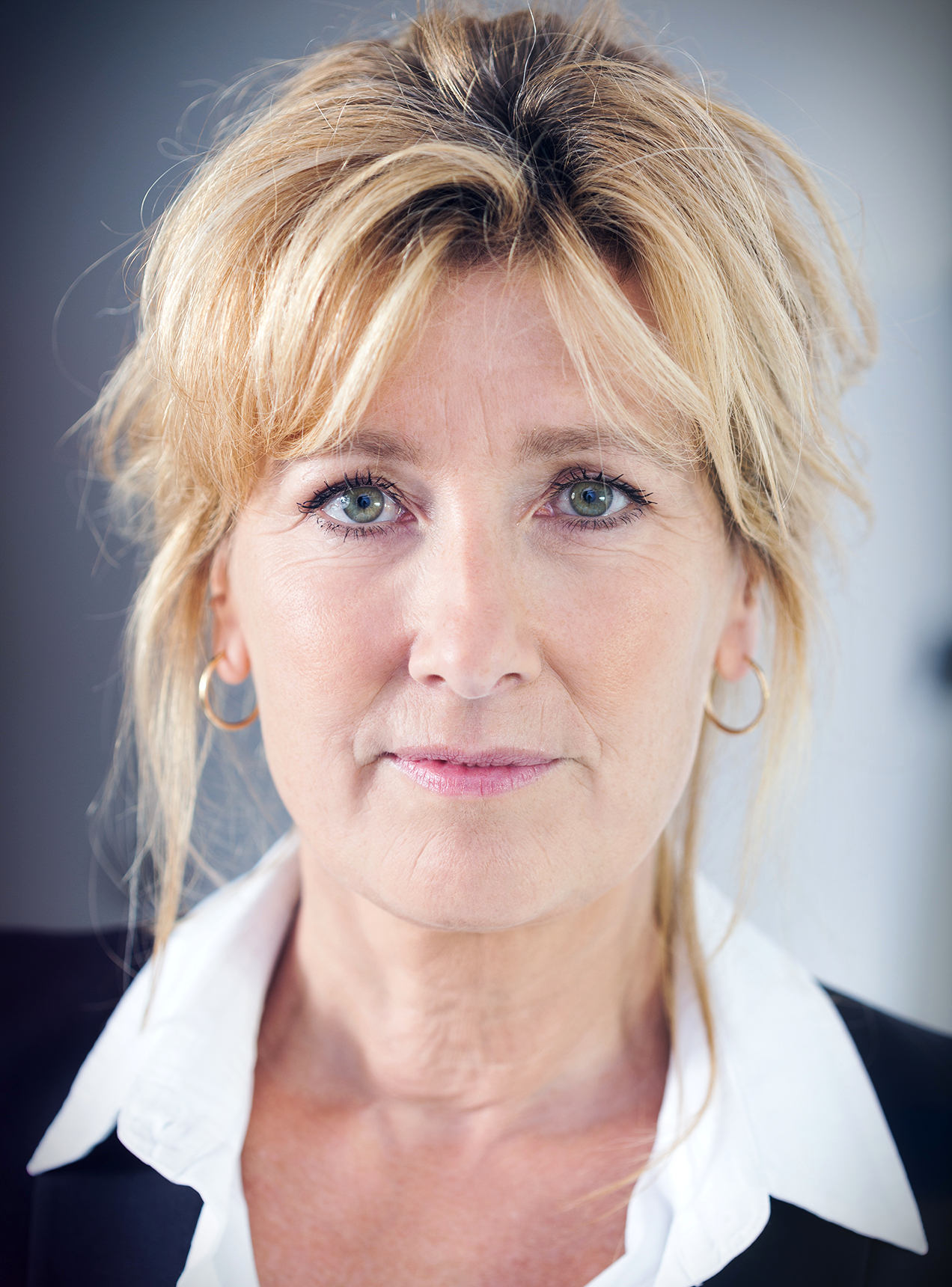
- Born: 1 February 1966 (age 60); Voorburg, Netherlands
- Occupation: Actress
- Years active: 1993–present
- Website: arianeschluter.nl

Ariane Schluter (born 1 February 1966) is a Dutch actress. She is best known for playing in films by such Dutch filmmakers as Alex van Warmerdam and Theo van Gogh.

== Career ==
Ariane Schluter studied at the Maastricht Academy of Dramatic Arts. After finishing her studies, she played in various theater plays. In 1994 she was a co-writer of the script for 06, which was filmed by Theo Van Gogh and won a special Jury Price at the Netherlands Film Festival. Another famous Dutch filmmaker – Alex van Warmerdam – did several films starring Ariane Schluter: The Dress (1996), Little Tony (1998), Waiter (2006).

From 2015 till 2016 she was part of the film jury for ShortCutz Amsterdam. An annual film festival promoting short films in Amsterdam, the Netherlands. Other jury members include Rutger Hauer, Roel Reine and Jan Harlan.

== Filmography ==
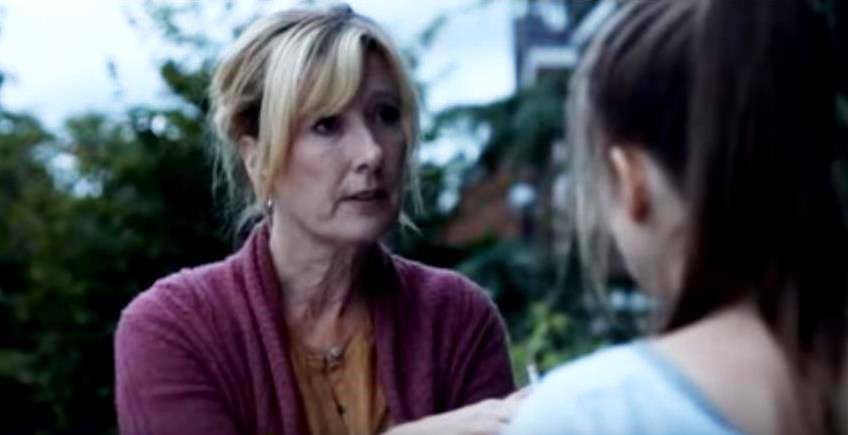
Schluter (2015)

- 06 (a.k.a. 1-900 (Sex Without Hangups)) (1994) by Theo van Gogh
- Once Beaten, Twice Shy (Eenmaal geslagen, nooit meer bewogen) (1995)
- The Shadow Walkers (De Schaduwlopers) (1995)
- The Dress (De Jurk) (1996) by Alex van Warmerdam
- The Stowaway (De Verstekeling) (1997)
- Little Tony (Kleine Teun) (1998) by Alex van Warmerdam
- Resistance (2003)
- Schat (2004)
- 06/05 (2004) by Theo van Gogh
- Johan (2005)
- Waiter (2006) by Alex van Warmerdam
- Pandora's la (2007)
- The Dark House (2009)
- Matterhorn (2013)
- Accused (2014)
- Your Mother Should Know (2018)
- Instinct (2019)
- My Father Is an Airplane (2021)

== Awards and nominations ==
- 1994 – Nomination Golden Calf Best Actress, Nederlands Film Festival, for 06
- 2015 – Golden Calf Best Actress in a TV-Drama, Nederlands Film Festival, for Een goed leven
- 2015 – Nomination Golden Calf Best Actress, Nederlands Film Festival, for Accused
