= Lyne Renée =

Belgian actress (born 1979)

- Born: Line Van Wambeke; 17 May 1979 (age 47); Velzeke, Zottegem, Belgium
- Other name: Lyne Renee
- Occupations: Actress, Artist, Model, Singer
- Years active: 2003-current
- Known for: Strike Back, Deep State, Motherland: Fort Salem, Gossip Girl (2021)
- Height: 5’9” (1.75 m)
- Relatives: Ruben Van Wambeke (brother) Camille Van Wambeke (sister)

Lyne Renée (born Line Van Wambeke; 17 May 1979) is a Belgian actress, artist, model, and singer.

She was born in Velzeke, Zottegem, Belgium, and graduated from the Studio Herman Teirlinck in Antwerp. From 2003 to 2005 she appeared as a stage actress in Belgian theaters. She then starred in the Belgian TV series Kinderen van Dewindt and the Dutch movie Ober by Alex van Warmerdam.

In 2006, she moved to Los Angeles, where she appeared in the movies Love At First Kill (2008) and The Hessen Conspiracy (2009).

In 2011, she moved to London, where she starred in The River Line at the Jermyn Street Theatre. In 2013, she was cast as Mossad agent, Rebecca Levi, in the TV series Strike Back. She also appeared in Parade's End.

In 2016, she had a recurring role on the ABC series Of Kings and Prophets as the Witch of Endor, and appeared in the miniseries Madoff as Catherine Hooper, fiancée of Andrew Madoff, and had a role in the thriller Split.

In 2017, she appeared in the second season of the PBS series Mercy Street as well as Stephen Fry’s The Hippopotamus.

In 2020, she was cast in a recurring role as General Sarah Alder in the Freeform series Motherland: Fort Salem. She was upped to a series regular in season two.

In 2021, she appeared as Helena Bergmann, mother to Obie Bergmann, in the Gossip Girl reboot on HBO for two seasons.

Alongside her acting work, Renée is also a model, having participated in campaigns for Diana Broussard, Diane von Fürstenberg, Alice Temperley, and David Yurman.

In her free time, she enjoys singing (of which she is credited in the Motherland: Fort Salem soundtrack), painting, and is a partner in creating home murals for interior design companies out of New York City.

== Filmography ==
=== Film ===
Year	Title	Role	Notes
2006	Ober	Stella	
2008	Love At First Kill	Marie Dupont	
2009	The Hessen Conspiracy	Lt. Kathleen Nash	
2014	Here Lies	Petra Kolaski	
2016	Split	Academic Moderator	
2017	The Hippopotamus	Valerie	
2017	The Meyerowitz Stories	European Woman	
2019	The Gentlemen	Jackie	
2021	Wrath of Man	Kirsty	Credited as Lyne Renee

=== Television ===
Year	Title	Role	Notes
2010	Kinderen van Dewindt	Tinne Van Wesemael	12 episodes
2012	Parade's End	Marie-Léonie	2 episodes
2012–2013	Strike Back	Rebecca Levi	Recurring role, 4 episodes
2014	Banshee	Young Housewife	Episode: "The Truth About Unicorns"
2016	Madoff	Catherine Hooper	Television miniseries
2016	Of Kings and Prophets	The Witch of Endor	Recurring role, 4 episodes
2016	Madam Secretary	Cecile Zaman	2 episodes
2017	Mercy Street	Lisette Beaufort	3 episodes
2018	Deep State	Anna Easton	Main role (season 1)
2020–2022	Motherland: Fort Salem	General Sarah Alder	Main role
2021–2023	Gossip Girl	Helena Bergmann	Recurring role, 7 episodes

=== Video games ===
Year	Title	Role
2025	Marvel 1943: Rise of Hydra	Julie
