= Nr. 10 =

2021 Dutch film

- Theatrical release poster
- Directed by: Alex van Warmerdam
- Written by: Alex van Warmerdam
- Produced by: Marc van Warmerdam
- Starring: Tom Dewispelaere; Frieda Barnhard; Pierre Bokma; Gene Bervoets
- Cinematography: Tom Erisman
- Edited by: Job ter Burg
- Music by: Alex van Warmerdam
- Production company: Graniet Film
- Distributed by: Cinéart
- Release date: 30 September 2021
- Running time: 100 minutes
- Countries: Netherlands; Belgium
- Languages: Dutch; English; German

Nr. 10 is a 2021 Dutch-Belgian thriller film by Alex van Warmerdam. The film had its national theatrical release on 30 September 2021, on the closing night of the Netherlands Film Festival. That same evening, the film was scheduled to premiere in another one-hundred cinemas across the Netherlands.

== Plot ==
Günter, found in a German forest as a four-year old, grows up in a foster family. Four decades later, he leads a normal life: he earns a living as a stage actor, spends time with his daughter Lizzy, and has an affair with a married woman. He doesn't start wondering about his origins until a stranger on a bridge whispers a single word in his ear.

== Cast ==
- Tom Dewispelaere as Günter
- Frieda Barnhard as Lizzy
- Hans Kesting as Karl
- Anniek Pheifer as Isabel
- Pierre Bokma as Marius
- Dirk Böhling as Wassinski
- Mandela Wee Wee as Innocence
- Richard Gonlag as Poelzig
- Gene Bervoets as Reichenbach
