= Accused (2014 film) =

2014 film

- Film poster
- Directed by: Paula van der Oest
- Written by: Moniek Kramer; Tijs van Marle
- Starring: Ariane Schluter
- Edited by: Marcel Wijninga
- Production company: Rinkel Film
- Distributed by: Independent Films
- Release date: 3 April 2014
- Running time: 97 minutes
- Countries: Netherlands; Sweden
- Language: Dutch

Accused (Dutch: Lucia de B.) is a 2014 drama film directed by Paula van der Oest and written by Moniek Kramer. The film is based on the Lucia de Berk case, a miscarriage of justice in the Netherlands, in which a paediatric nurse was wrongfully sentenced to life imprisonment, with no possibility of parole, for the death of four patients under her care.

The film was selected as the Dutch entry for the Best Foreign Language Film at the 87th Academy Awards, making the January Shortlist.

== Cast ==
- Ariane Schluter as Lucia de Berk
- Barry Atsma as Jaap van Hoensbroeck
- Sallie Harmsen as Judith Jansen
- Marwan Kenzari as Rechercheur Ron Leeflang
- Fedja van Huêt as Quirijn Herzberg
- Annet Malherbe as Ernestine Johansson
- Amanda Ooms as Jenny

== See also ==
- List of submissions to the 87th Academy Awards for Best Foreign Language Film
- List of Dutch submissions for the Academy Award for Best Foreign Language Film
