= Grimm (film) =

2003 comedy drama film by Alex van Warmerdam

- Theatrical release poster
- Directed by: Alex van Warmerdam
- Written by: Alex van Warmerdam; Otakar Votocek
- Produced by: Wim Lehnhausen; Ton Schippers; Marc van Warmerdam
- Starring: Halina Reijn; Jacob Derwig; Carmelo Gómez; Elvira Mínguez
- Cinematography: Tom Erisman
- Edited by: Stefan Kamp
- Music by: Alex van Warmerdam
- Production company: Graniet Film
- Distributed by: A-Film Distribution
- Release dates: 10 September 2003 (TIFF); 4 December 2003 (Netherlands)
- Running time: 103 minutes
- Country: Netherlands
- Languages: Dutch; Spanish
- Budget: €4 million
- Box office: $240,632

Grimm is a 2003 comedy drama film directed by Alex van Warmerdam, based on a script he co-wrote with Otakar Votocek. It is loosely inspired by the Brothers Grimm story "Brother and Sister" and incorporating contemporary urban legends, such as that of the kidney heist. The movie stars Halina Reijn, Jacob Derwig, Carmelo Gómez and Elvira Mínguez.

== Plot ==
A brother and sister, Jacob and Marie, live with their father and mother. The family is in a situation where living becomes difficult for them. One day Jacob and Marie's father abandons the two of them in woods while they go collecting firewood. From that moment on, the two teens must fend for themselves, fighting off rape and taking on any possible situation, reacting to situations as if animals. Their mother put a note in Jacob's jacket telling them to go to their aunt and uncle in Spain, but they arrive to find them both deceased in an accident.

Not sure what to do, Jacob, feeling hungry, goes to buy a roll, and finds a note left by Marie that she has gone off to marry a rich man named Diego. Jacob arrives at the house, ominous in spite of its brightness, and finds much to distrust in Diego.

Diego, a surgeon, then plots to steal Jacob's kidney to help his sick sister Theresa. Diego drugs both Marie and Jacob and separates the brother and sister.

After Marie escapes, she finds Jacob severely injured in a stolen car and both brother and sister (reunited again) drive away. Suddenly they are chased by Diego in a car. In the chase Diego's car crashes off the road. Jacob and Marie take shelter in an abandoned house in an abandoned village. With the help of Marie, ailing Jacob gets healed.

As the days pass one windy day Diego comes in search to take Marie and kill Jacob. In the encounter by hide and seek Jacob kills Diego by shooting an arrow. Jacob and Marie bury Diego's body and on hearing sound they sneak under the house. Police come on routine patrol and search the house and leave.

Jacob and Marie sit relaxed beside a nearby flowing river and the credits scroll on.

== Cast ==
- Halina Reijn as Marie
- Jacob Derwig as Jacob
- Carmelo Gómez as Diego
- Elvira Mínguez as Teresa
- Ulises Dumont as Luis
- Frank Lammers as Farmer
- Annet Malherbe as Farmer's wife
- Teresa Berganza as Mother
- Johan Leysen as Father

== Release ==
The film was shown at the 2004's Miami Film Festival.
