= Fiona Tan =

Indonesian visual artist

- Born: 1966 (age 59–60); Pekanbaru, Indonesia
- Known for: video art and film installations
- Website: www.fionatan.nl

Fiona Tan (born 1966 in Pekanbaru, Indonesia) is a visual artist primarily known for her photography, film and video art installations. With her own complex cultural background, Tan's work is known for its skillful craftsmanship and emotional intensity, which often explores the themes of identity, memory, and history. Tan currently lives and works in Amsterdam, the Netherlands.

== Early life and education ==
Fiona Tan was born in 1966 in Pekanbaru, Indonesia, to an Indonesian Chinese father and Australian mother. Tan spent her early childhood in Melbourne, Australia. In 1984 she moved to Europe, where she has resided since. Between 1988 and 1992 Tan studied at Gerrit Rietveld Academie in Amsterdam. Between 1996-1997 she also studied at the Rijksakademie van Beeldende Kunst.

== Artistic practice ==
On April 30, 2025, the Rijksmuseum announced that Tan would curate their summer exhibition, Fiona Tan: Monomania, featuring works from the museum's collection; she is the first contemporary artist invited to curate at the Rijksmuseum. The exhibition will also include a new work by Tan, Janine’s Room, which was commissioned by the museum.

In 2019, Tan completed a photography/film project titled L'archive des ombres/Shadow Archive during her residency at the Mundaneum, a repository created by Belgian visionary Paul Otlet with the goal of cataloging all human knowledge. An exhibition of the same name was staged at the Musée des Arts Contemporains Grand-Hornu, Belgium in 2019.

In 2009, she represented The Netherlands at the Venice Biennale with the solo presentation Disorient. She has also participated in Documenta 11, the Yokohama Triennale, the Berlin Biennale, São Paulo Biennial and also at the Istanbul Biennial, the Sydney Biennial and Asian Pacific Triennial. Her work is represented in many international public and private collections including the Tate Modern, London, Stedelijk Museum Amsterdam, Schaulager, Basel, the New Museum, New York, and the Centre Georges Pompidou, Paris.

In 2016, she directed her debut film, History's Future.^{[3]}Her second feature film Ascent premiered at the 2016 Locarno International Film Festival. During this year she was also the artist in residence at the Getty Research Institute in Los Angeles, California. Here third feature, Dearest Fiona, premiered at the Berlin Film Festival in 2023.

Tan participated in established international residencies, including IASPIS grant and residency, Stockholm (2003) and DAAD scholarship and residency, Berlin (2001).

She has been guest lecturer at many art institutions including professor at the postgraduate program De Ateliers, Amsterdam (2006–2014) and Kunsthochschule Kassel (2014–15).

== Exhibitions ==
Tan has had solo exhibitions in museums and galleries worldwide including the New Museum, New York, Vancouver Art Gallery, Sackler Galleries, Washington DC, Aargauer Kunsthaus, Switzerland, Akademie der Künsten, Berlin, Kunstverein Hamburg, Konsthal Lund, Landesgalerie Linz, Musée d'Art Contemporain, Montréal, Pinakothek der Moderne, Munich, and the Hammer Museum, Los Angeles.

=== Solo exhibitions ===
- Disorient, Dutch Pavilion, 53rd Venice Biennale (2009)
- Rise and Fall, Vancouver Art Gallery, Vancouver, Canada (2010)
- Rise and Fall, Wako Works of Art, Tokyo (2011)
- Vox Populi London, The Photographers' Gallery, London (2012)
- Inventory, Philadelphia Museum of Art, Philadelphia (2013-2014)
- Terminology, Metropolitan Museum for Photography, Tokyo (2014)
- Terminology, National Museum of Art, Osaka, Japan (2014)
- Nellie, Wako Works of Art, Tokyo (2014)
- Options & Futures, Rabo Kunstzone, Utrecht, Netherlands (2014)
- Depot, Baltic Centre for Contemporary Art, Gateshead, UK (2015)
- Ghost Dwellings, Frith Street Gallery Soho Square, London (2015)
- Geography of Time, Norwegian Museum of Contemporary Art (2015-2016)
- Geography of Time, MUDAM, Luxembourg (2016)
- Ascent, Izu Photo Museum, Nagaizumi, Japan (2016)
- Geography of Time, Museum für Moderne Kunst, Frankfurt, Germany (2016-2017)
- Disorient, Guggenheim Museum Bilbao, Abando, Spain (2016-2017)
- Nellie, Institute of Modern Art, Brisbane, Australia (2017)
- Ascent, De Pont Museum, Tilburg, Netherlands (2017)
- Time and Memory, Centro de Creación Contemporánea de Andalucía, Spain (2018)
- Elsewhere, Frith Street Gallery, London (2018-2019)
- Archive / Ruins, Peter Freeman, Inc., New York (2020)
- Fiona Tan - With the Other Hand, Museum der Moderne Salzburg (2020)
- Fiona Tan - With the Other Hand, Kunsthalle Krems (2020)
- Fiona Tan - Mountains and Molehills, Eye Film Institute Netherlands, Amsterdam (2022)
- Fiona Tan: Footsteps, Frith Street Gallery, London (2023)
- Fiona Tan: Footsteps, Museum of the Moving Image, New York (2024)
- Fiona Tan: Monomania, Rijksmuseum Amsterdam (2025)

=== Group exhibitions ===
- Go-Betweens, Mori Art Museum, Tokyo, Japan (2014)
- Paradise Lost, CCA, Singapore (2014)
- FUTURE PRESENT, Schaulager, Laurenz Foundation, Basel, Switzerland (2015)
- NO MAN'S LAND, Rubell Family Collection, Miami, United States (2015)
- Ecce Homo, The National Museum of Art, Osaka, Japan (2016)

== Awards ==
- ICP Infinity Award for Art, New York (2004)
- Getty Artist-in-Residence Fellowship, Los Angeles (2016)

== Publications ==
- Tan, Fiona (2015). Fiona Tan : geography of time. London: Koenig Books. ISBN 9783863358396. OCLC 923727690.
- Tan, Fiona (2006). Fiona Tan. Heidelberg: Kehrer Verlag. p. 384 pages. ISBN 9783936636895. OCLC 123470361.
