= Matterhorn (film) =

2013 film

- Theatrical release poster
- Directed by: Diederik Ebbinge
- Written by: Diederik Ebbinge
- Produced by: Gijs van de Westelaken
- Starring: René van 't Hof
- Cinematography: Dennis Wielaert
- Edited by: Michiel Reichwein
- Distributed by: Cinéart
- Release date: 7 February 2013 (IFFR)
- Running time: 87 minutes
- Country: Netherlands
- Language: Dutch

Matterhorn is a 2013 Dutch drama film directed by Diederik Ebbinge. It competed in the main competition section of the 35th Moscow International Film Festival.

== Cast ==
- René van 't Hof as Theo
- Ton Kas as Fred
- Ko Aerts as Autowasser
- Kees Alberts as Johan 8 jaar
- Lucas Dijker as Jongen op voetbalveld
- Porgy Franssen as Kamps
- Alex Klaasen as Zoon Fred
- Elise Schaap as Trudy
- Ariane Schluter as Saskia
- Sieger Sloot as Vader kinderpartijtje
- Michel Sluysmans as Gemeente ambtenaar
- Helmert Woudenberg as Predikant
