= The Last Days of Emma Blank =

2009 film

- Theatrical release poster
- Directed by: Alex van Warmerdam
- Written by: Alex van Warmerdam
- Produced by: Marc van Warmerdam
- Starring: Marlies Heuer; Gene Bervoets
- Cinematography: Tom Erisman
- Edited by: Job ter Burg
- Music by: Alex van Warmerdam
- Production companies: Graniet Film; VARA
- Distributed by: A-Film Distribution
- Release date: 7 May 2009
- Running time: 89 minutes
- Country: Netherlands
- Language: Dutch

The Last Days of Emma Blank (Dutch: De laatste dagen van Emma Blank) is a 2009 Dutch surrealist film directed by Alex van Warmerdam.

== Cast ==
- Marlies Heuer as Emma Blank
- Gene Bervoets as Haneveld
- Annet Malherbe as Bella
- Eva van de Wijdeven as Gonnie
- Gijs Naber as Meier
- Alex van Warmerdam as Theo
