= Ronald Roose =

American film editor and screenwriter

- Born: Ronald Franklin Roose; December 24, 1945
- Died: September 15, 2021 (aged 75); New York, U.S.
- Occupations: Film editor, screenwriter

Ronald Franklin Roose (December 24, 1945 – September 15, 2021) was an American film editor and screenwriter. He was best known for his film editing work in the films Star Trek VI: The Undiscovered Country, The Wanderers, Company Business, Easy Money, Hoffa, House Arrest and Serpico.

Aside from film editing, in 2002, Roose co-wrote along with David Griffiths, the Andrew Davis film Collateral Damage, starring Arnold Schwarzenegger, and in 2009, he co-wrote along with Nicholas Meyer, the Paul Breuls film The Hessen Affair, starring Billy Zane.

Roose died from Parkinson's disease at his home in New York, on September 15, 2021, at the age of 75.
