= Little Tony (film) =

- Theatrical release poster
- Directed by: Alex van Warmerdam
- Written by: Alex van Warmerdam
- Based on: Kleine Teun by Alex van Warmerdam
- Produced by: Marc van Warmerdam; Ton Schippers; Alex van Warmerdam
- Starring: Annet Malherbe; Alex van Warmerdam; Ariane Schluter
- Cinematography: Marc Felperlaan
- Edited by: Stefan Kamp
- Music by: Alex van Warmerdam
- Production company: Graniet Film
- Distributed by: Warner Bros.
- Release date: 30 April 1998
- Running time: 95 minutes
- Country: Netherlands
- Language: Dutch

Little Tony (Dutch: Kleine Teun) is a 1998 Dutch comedy drama film written and directed by Alex van Warmerdam, based on his play Kleine Teun. It was screened in the Un Certain Regard section at the 1998 Cannes Film Festival.

== Plot ==
Farmer Brand can't read and he is quite happy with that. His wife, Keet, who has to read him all the subtitles on the television, isn't. She decides to hire a teacher for him. This is a beautiful young woman, called Lena. Brand falls in love with her. To his puzzlement and dismay Keet encourages him, because as she says she doesn't want a husband with another woman in his head. She even goes so far as to claim, she's just Brand's sister. She also wants Lena to give Brand and her a son. The love between Brand and Lena does not grow stale as Keet hoped after the birth of little Tony. Keet, who is a barren herself decides Lena has to be eliminated with the arrival of little Tony between them.

== Cast ==
- Alex van Warmerdam as Brand
- Annet Malherbe as Keet
- Ariane Schluter as Lena
- Sebastiaan te Wierik as Kleine Teun
- Aat Ceelen as Butcher
- Beppe Costa as Verger
- Joeri Keyzers as Baby
- Rick Keyzers as Baby
- Maike Meijer as Young Mother
- Thomas Rap as Man at strawheap
- Hanneke Riemer as Friend of Lena
- Dolf Sauter as Priest
- Tomas te Wierk as Teun
- Houk van Warmerdam as Acolyte
- Marc van Warmerdam as Neighbour
- Mees van Warmerdam as Acolyte

== Reception ==
In a review for Variety, David Rooney called the film "[a] droll comedy", but also mentioning that its "both blacker and more tightly focused".

== Accolades ==
Accolades received by Little Tony
Year	Award	Category	Recipient(s)	Result	Ref.
1998	Netherlands Film Festival	Golden Calf for Best Actress	Annet Malherbe	Nominated	.
