= Borgman (film) =

2013 film

- Theatrical release poster
- Directed by: Alex van Warmerdam
- Written by: Alex van Warmerdam
- Starring: Jan Bijvoet; Hadewych Minis; Jeroen Perceval; Sara Hjort Ditlevsen; Annet Malherbe; Eva van de Wijdeven; Tom Dewispelaere; Alex van Warmerdam; Gene Bervoets; Ariane Schluter; Mike Weerts
- Cinematography: Tom Erisman
- Edited by: Job ter Burg
- Production companies: Graniet Film; Omroep NTR
- Distributed by: Cinéart
- Release dates: 19 May 2013 (Cannes); 29 August 2013 (Netherlands)
- Running time: 118 minutes
- Country: Netherlands
- Languages: Dutch; English

Borgman is a 2013 Dutch psychological thriller drama film directed by Alex van Warmerdam. It was nominated for the Palme d'Or at the 2013 Cannes Film Festival. . It was the winner of best film category at SITGES festival. It was screened in the Vanguard section at the 2013 Toronto International Film Festival. The film was selected as the Dutch entry for the Best Foreign Language Film at the 86th Academy Awards, but it was not nominated.

== Plot ==
An armed priest, together with two other men, drive a hobo and his companions from their underground hideouts. The hobo, identifying himself as Anton, then appears at the door of a mansion. There he encounters Richard and Marina, an upper-class married couple with three children. He claims he knows Marina, that she had nursed him in hospital, and demands food and a bath. Due to his aggressive behaviour, Richard gets angry and violently beats him. However, Marina, driven by guilt and curiosity, decides to help him and allows him to stay in the garden shed, without Richard knowing it. During Richard's absence, Anton apparently befriends Marina and all three children. He has the ability to control Marina's dreams, so she starts to despise her husband while growing to like Anton.

One day Anton leaves the family and meets his mysterious team, Ludwig, Pascal, Brenda and Ilonka, who start a sinister plot against the family. They poison the family gardener and strangle his wife, then return to the family. Now well-dressed and shaven, Anton identifies himself as Camiel Borgman and becomes the new gardener. He gets the guest room while his team settles in the garden shed, and they slowly take on roles in the life of the family.

Soon it is revealed that Camiel and his team have the ability to control people, corrupting their minds or killing them in cold blood if deemed necessary. Camiel seduces Marina to the point that she wants Richard dead, while Pascal seduces the family babysitter Stine, causing her to become hostile towards her boyfriend. The team also takes the children into the hideout to perform some kind of surgery on them, causing them to be more comfortable with Camiel and his team than with their own parents. The team then poisons Richard. Marina, hoping to be with Camiel, is shocked when he calmly refuses her advances. He poisons her later, and both she and Richard are buried under the garden. Camiel, his team, Stine and the children then depart into the forest.

== Cast ==
- Jan Bijvoet as Camiel Borgman
- Hadewych Minis as Marina
- Jeroen Perceval as Richard
- Alex van Warmerdam as Ludwig
- Tom Dewispelaere as Pascal
- Sara Hjort Ditlevsen as Stine
- Elve Lijbaart as Isolde
- Dirkje van der Pijl as Rebecca
- Pieter-Bas de Waard as Leo
- Eva van de Wijdeven as Ilonka
- Annet Malherbe as Brenda

== Reception ==
Borgman has an approval rating of 87% on review aggregator website Rotten Tomatoes, based on 62 reviews, and an average rating of 7.2/10. The website's critical consensus states: "Borgman's unpredictability may confound as many viewers as it enthralls, but either way, it's a refreshingly original experiment in off-kilter terror. Metacritic assigned the film a weighted average score of 66 out of 100, based on 22 critics, indicating "generally favorable reviews".

== See also ==
- List of submissions to the 86th Academy Awards for Best Foreign Language Film
- List of Dutch submissions for the Academy Award for Best Foreign Language Film
