= Jessica Sutton =

South African actress (born 1993)

- Born: 2 June 1993 (age 33); Cape Town, South Africa
- Education: ACT Film Academy
- Years active: 2014–present

Jessica Laura Sutton (born 2 June 1993) is a South African actress. She is best known as Tally Craven from the Freeform series Motherland: Fort Salem and Mia in The Kissing Booth.

== Early life and education ==
Sutton was born in Cape Town, South Africa. Her primary school years were spent at Sweet Valley Primary School in Cape Town. She attended Act Cape Town (ACT) Film Academy and received her diploma in 2014 in Advanced Acting for Film and continues her studies with Matthew Harrison at The Actors Foundry in Vancouver.

== Career ==
Since her start on screen in 2015, Jessica has appeared in several television shows, including Saints & Strangers, Ice, Tracker, American Monster and Motherland: Fort Salem. Her most recent film, Rogue, stars Megan Fox and was released in 2020. She also appeared in the films Detour, Finders Keepers, Bhai's Cafe, Escape Room, The Kissing Booth and Inside Man: Most Wanted.

== Filmography ==
Film roles
Year	Title	Role	Notes
2016	Detour	Brandy	
2017	Finder's Keepers	Anya	
2018	Bhai's Cafe	Stephanie	
2018	Escape Room	Allison	Action/Adventure/Horror
2018	The Kissing Booth	Mia	Comedy/Romance
2019	Inside Man: Most Wanted	Ava	Action/Crime/Thriller
2020	Rogue	Asilia Wilson	

Television roles
Year	Title	Role	Notes
2015	Saints & Strangers	Lizzie Tilley	Miniseries
2018	Ice	Carly	2 episodes: "Two Ounces", "Strange Friends"
2019–2022	Motherland: Fort Salem	Tally Craven	30 episodes - Main role
2024	Tracker	Quinn Ridgely	Season 2 Episode 4 "Noble Rot"

== Theater ==
Year	Title	Role	Notes
2014	To being or not being	Jenna	
2016	Human Vortex	Little Girl	
