= Abel (1986 film) =

1986 film by Alex van Warmerdam

- Theatrical release poster
- Directed by: Alex van Warmerdam
- Written by: Alex van Warmerdam
- Produced by: Laurens Geels; Dick Maas; Robert Swaab
- Starring: Alex van Warmerdam; Henri Garcin; Olga Zuiderhoek; Annet Malherbe; Loes Luca
- Cinematography: Marc Felperlaan
- Edited by: Hans van Dongen
- Music by: Vincent van Warmerdam
- Production company: First Floor Features
- Distributed by: Concorde Film
- Release date: 27 February 1986
- Running time: 100 minutes
- Country: Netherlands
- Language: Dutch

Abel is a 1986 Dutch film written and directed by Alex van Warmerdam who also played the lead character. Other lead roles were played by Henri Garcin, Annet Malherbe and Olga Zuiderhoek. Supporting roles were played by Loes Luca and Arend Jan Heerma van Voss among others. The music was written by Vincent van Waterdam, and it was the first film was produced by First Floor Features.

== Plot ==
Abel is a 31-year-old man who still lives with his parents. Due to agoraphobia, he hasn't been out for over 10 years, much to the chagrin of his father, Victor. On the other hand, he gets spoiled by his mother, Duif. He spends most of his days spying on the neighbors, setting up his parents against each other, knowingly or unknowingly, and fruitlessly trying to cut flies in two with an enormous pair of scissors.

His father enlists a psychiatrist who deduces the cause of problems are the parents' unhealthy relation with Abel. He then summons a mesmerist who gets frustrated by Abel. Victor then tries to set up his son with a girl in his theater society, it too fails. After a lot of planning, the mother and son secretly buy a TV set against Victor's wishes. When Victor discovers this deception he gets furious and runs his son out on to the streets.

Abel meets Zus, who works at a peepshow called "De Naakte Meisjes" (The naked girls). She takes pity on him and starts a relation with him. Abel finds out Zus has a relationship with a married man and it turned out to be his own father. In the meantime, his mother finds out Abel's whereabouts and informs her husband. When Victor knows his Son is in a relationship with his favoured prostitute, he becomes enraged and goes into a psychotic fit. A confrontation with Abel and his parents takes place at Zus' place. The drunken Victor tries to chase Zus. His son informs Duif that Victor had an extramarital affair with Zus. Duif threatens to commit suicide. Though when she finds neither her beloved son or husband takes her seriously, she calms down and finally leaves her son with the prostitute and takes her husband home. Finally Abel laughs at all this with Zus and cuts a fly into two with his scissors.

== Cast ==
- Alex van Warmerdam as Abel, son
- Henri Garcin as Victor, father
- Olga Zuiderhoek as Duif, mother
- Annet Malherbe as Zus, prostitute
- Arend Jan Heerma van Voss as psychiatrist
- Anton Kothuis as mesmerist
- Loes Luca as Christine, the girl arranged by Victor for Abel's date
- Peer Mascini as director

== Production ==
Abel was van Warmerdam's directional debut. He at first planned to make the movie in black and white but others discouraged this and he chose colour instead. The vast majority of the movie is situated in a fictive kind of Dutch fifties. Abel had over 300 000 viewers at its premiere, and it received a Gouden Kalf for 'Best film' and a Gouden Kalf for 'Best director'. In 1990 the tragedic comedy was named Best Dutch Film of the eighties by the Kring van Nederlandse Journalisten. In 2000 Abel was released on DVD. Abel was produced in collaboration with Orkater and the VPRO.
