= Siv Ngesi =

South African actor

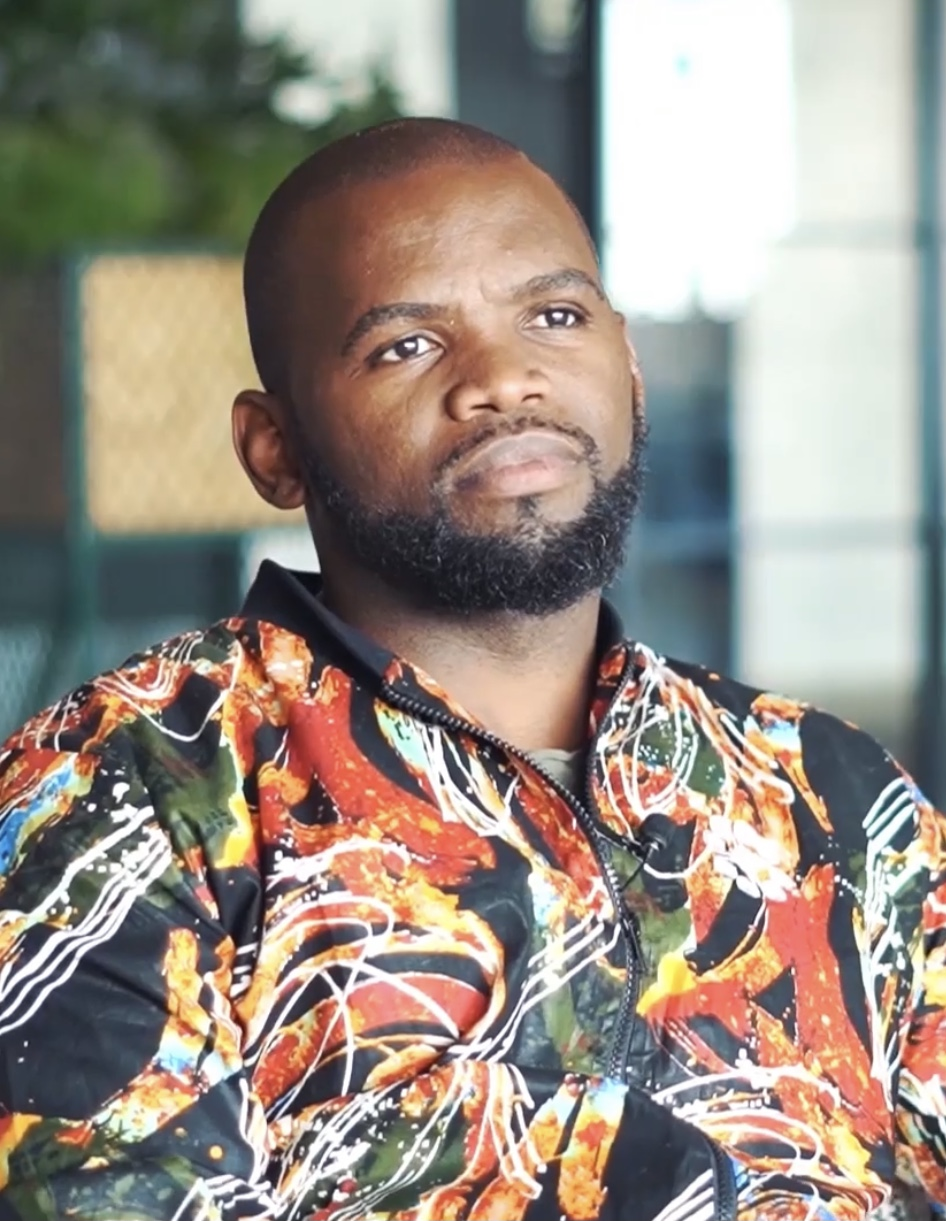
- Ngesi in 2019
- Born: Sivuyile Ngesi; 18 October 1985 (age 40); Gugulethu, Western Cape, South Africa
- Other name: Sivanna
- Occupations: Actor, comedian, presenter, producer
- Years active: 1997–present
- Website: iamsiv.com

Sivuyile Ngesi (born 28 October 1985) is a South African actor, comedian, presenter, and producer.

== Early life ==
Ngesi was born to a Xhosa family of four children in Gugulethu in the east of Cape Town. He spent his early childhood there before moving to Langa and later Pinelands. His mother Jacqueline is a school principal. He lost his father to a car accident in 2004. Ngesi attended Pinelands High School and trained at the Waterfront Theatre School and Jazzart Dance Theatre. He explained during the #FeesMustFall movement that he was unable to afford university.

== Career ==
Ngesi began his career as a child actor, playing Gavroche in Les Misérables on tour in Asia. He also performed a piece from the musical for Nelson Mandela.

Ngesi made his television debut in the Disney Channel Original Movie Zenon: Z3 as Bobby and his feature film debut in The World Unseen. He guest starred as Thomas in 24: Redemption, a 2008 television film sequel to the Fox action series 24, and had a small role in the Nelson Mandela and Francois Pienaar biopic Invictus.

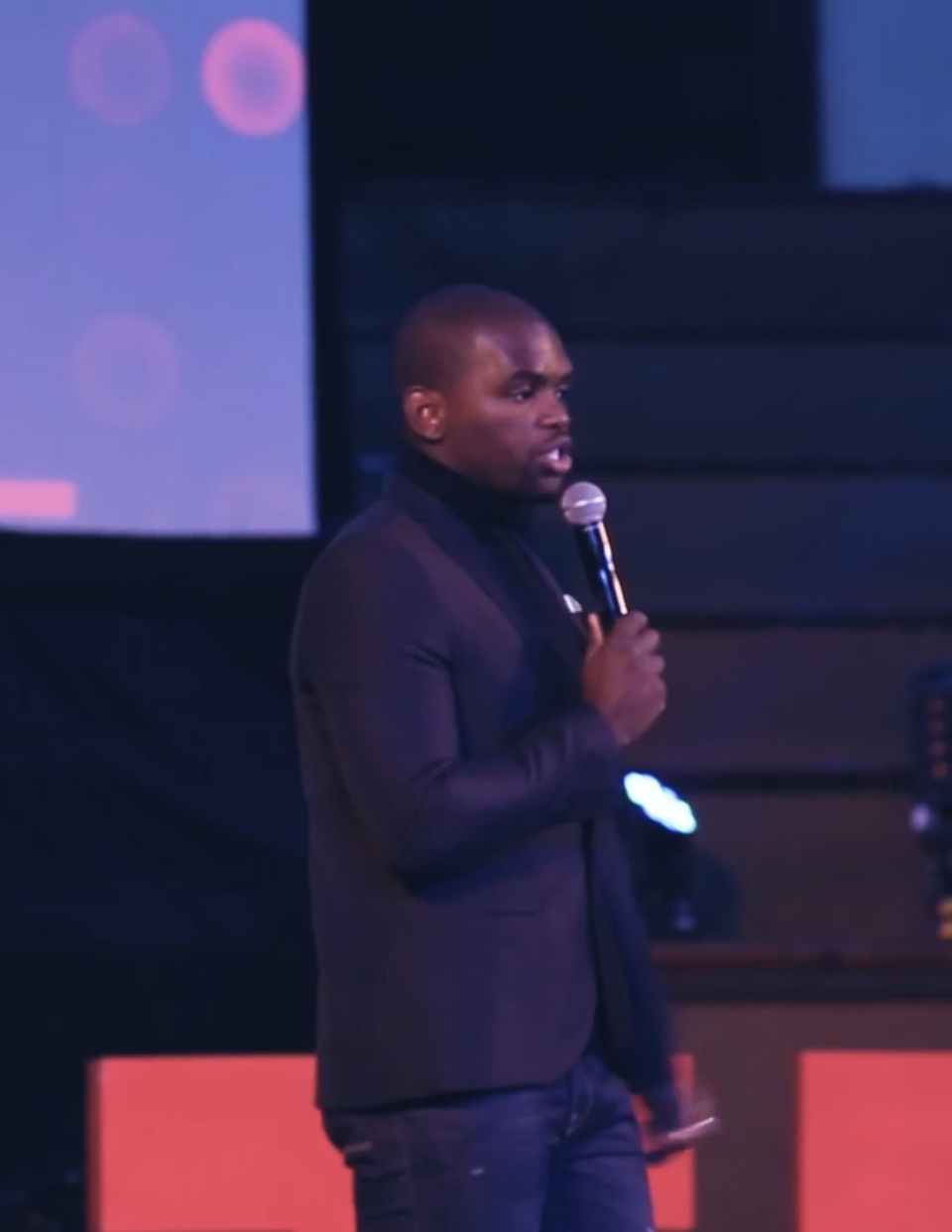
Ngesi at the 2015 TEDx Cape Town

Ngesi embarked on a one-man comedy show DeKaf, which ran for three years at the National Arts Festival and won the Golden Ovation Award for Best Comedy at the 2010 festival. He then took the show on a national tour.

Ngesi starred opposite Rob van Vuuren in the 2012 crime comedy film Copposites. He, van Vuuren, and Danielle Bischoff created the children's book series Florence & Watson as well as it accompanying stage show.

In 2014, Ngesi competed alongside dance partner Marcella Solimeo in the seventh season of Strictly Come Dancing, placing fifth in the competition that year.

Ngesi has hosted the magazine show The Man Cave since 2015, winning one out two nominations for Best TV Presenter at the South African Film and Television Awards (SAFTAs). In 2016, he began hosting and producing the reality cooking competition show Jou Ma se Chef. He had a recurring role as Udo in the third season of the Starz historical adventure series Black Sails.

Ngesi produced 14 shows at the 2017 National Arts Festival, taking home a Spirit of the Fringe award for his contributions to the festival that year. Among his shows that year was Siv-ilised.

In 2019, Ngesi appeared in three films: Knuckle City, which became South Africa's Academy Award submission in the Best International Feature Film category; Bhai's Cafe, a Bollywood-style musical; and the Afrikaans romantic comedy Kaalgat Karel. The following year, Ngesi joined the cast of the Showmax drama Still Breathing as the character T-Boss.

Ngesi created and began performing under the drag persona Sivanna in 2021. The name is a portmanteau of the cider drink Savanna and the Xhosa word Siyavana. He hosted the Cape Town Drag Brunch that December.

Ngesi joined the Showmax comedy Tali's Baby Diary for its second season as well as the Netflix drama Jiva. His recurring role as Victor in Dam, also on Showmax, earned him his first acting nomination at the 2022 SAFTAs for Best Supporting Actor, having received nods for his presenting work in the past.

It was revealed in January 2022 that Ngesi had joined the cast of the upcoming Gina Prince-Bythewood-directed and Viola Davis-produced film The Woman King.

== Filmography ==
=== Film ===
Year	Title	Role	Notes
2007	The World Unseen	John	
2009	Invictus	England Rose	
2009	Albert Schweitzer	Minkoe	
2010	Christmas in South Africa	Guide	
2012	Copposites	Alfred "Sharky" Majola	
2013	Mandela: Long Walk to Freedom	Aide	
2016	Honey 3: Dare to Dance	DJ Zubair Khumalo	
2017	Finders Keepers	SS	
2019	Bhai's Cafe	Patrick	
2019	Knuckle City	Goatee	
2019	438 Days	Chala	
2020	American Dream	Jude	
2021	Kaalgat Karel	Vuyo	
2022	Daryn's Gym	Jackson	
2022	The Woman King	The Migan	
TBA	Boyz Trip †	TBA	

=== Television ===
Year	Title	Role	Notes
2004	Zenon: Z3	Bobby	Disney Channel Original Movie
2008	24: Redemption	Thomas	Television film
2010	League of Glory	Kaiser Sigcau	Season 1
2011	Verschollen am Kap	Youssou	Miniseries
2012	Auf der Spur des Löwen	Noah	Television film
2012	S.I.E.S.	Ike Molefe	Main role
2014	Strictly Come Dancing	Himself	Season 7
2015–present	The Man Cave	Himself	Seasons 3–
2016	Jou Ma se Chef	Himself	
2016	Black Sails	Udo	4 episodes
2017	Wingin' It	Himself	
2017	Tropika Island of Treasure	Himself	Season 7
2020	Still Breathing	T-Boss	13 episodes
2021	Tali's Baby Diary	Selebi	Season 2
2021	Dam	Victor	4 episodes
2021	JIVA!	Paul	6 episodes

== Awards and nominations ==
Year	Award	Category	Work	Result	Ref
2010	Ovation Awards	Best Comedy	DeKaf	Won	
2017	Ovation Awards	Spirit of the Fringe Award		Won	
2017	South African Film and Television Awards	Best TV Presenter	The Man Cave	Nominated	
2018	South African Film and Television Awards	Best TV Presenter	Wingin' It	Nominated	
2019	South African Film and Television Awards	Best TV Presenter	The Man Cave	Won	
2019	Ovation Awards		The Chocolate Chronicles	Won	
2019	Ovation Awards		Tats is Cancelled	Won	
2022	South African Film and Television Awards	Best Supporting Actor in a TV Drama	Dam	Nominated	
2022	DStv Content Creator Awards	Cause Award		Pending	
