= In My Father's Garden =

2016 film

- Theatrical release poster
- Directed by: Ben Sombogaart
- Written by: Jan Siebelink; Hugo Heinen
- Starring: Gaite Jansen
- Release date: 25 February 2016
- Running time: 112 minutes
- Country: Netherlands
- Language: Dutch
- Box office: $1.9 million

In My Father's Garden (Dutch: Knielen op een bed violen) is a 2016 Dutch drama film directed by Ben Sombogaart. It was based on the book of the same name by Jan Siebelink. It was listed as one of eleven films that could be selected as the Dutch submission for the Best Foreign Language Film at the 89th Academy Awards, but it was not nominated.

== Cast ==
- Gaite Jansen as Johanna
- Barry Atsma as Hans Sievez
- Marcel Hensema as Jozef Mieras
- Noortje Herlaar as Margje
