= Job ter Burg =

Dutch film editor (born 1972)

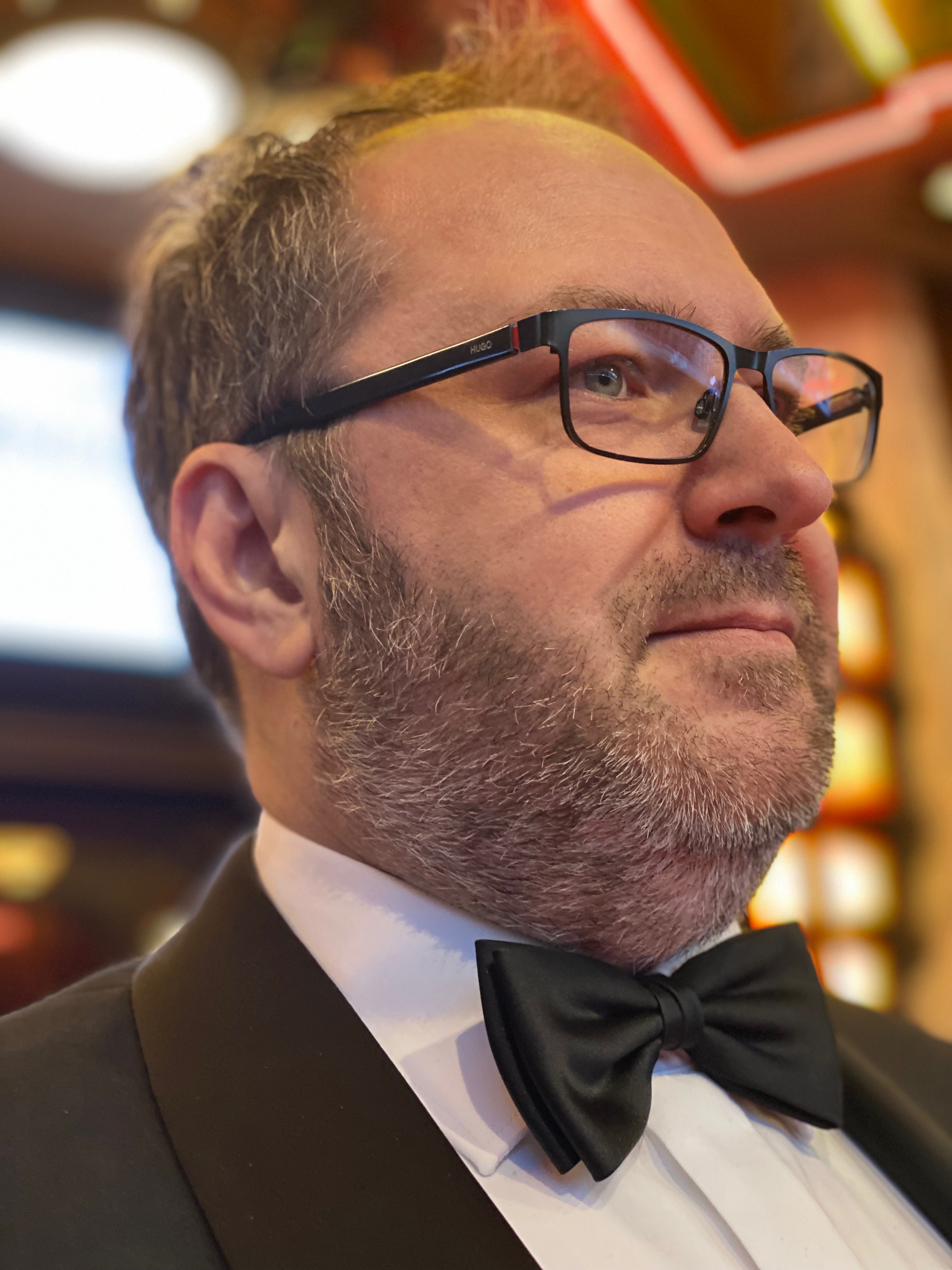

Job ter Burg (born 13 September 1972 in Maarn) is a Dutch film editor, best known for his long-term collaborations with directors Martin Koolhoven, Paul Verhoeven and Alex van Warmerdam. He was invited to join the Film Editors Branch of the Academy of Motion Picture Arts and Sciences in 2015 and elected active member of American Cinema Editors in 2016.

== Filmography ==
- Suzy Q (1999)
- AmnesiA (2001)
- Loonies (2002)
- Love to Love (2003)
- Godforsaken (2003)
- Snowfever (2004)
- Off Screen (2005)
- Schnitzel Paradise (2005)
- Bonkers (2005)
- Black Book (2006)
- 'n Beetje Verliefd (2006)
- Summer Heat (2008)
- Winter in Wartime (2008)
- The Last Days of Emma Blank (2009)
- Tirza (2010)
- Fuchsia the Mini-Witch (2010)
- Time to Spare (2011)
- Bringing Up Bobby (2011)
- Süskind (2012)
- Borgman (2013)
- Reckless (2014)
- Schneider vs. Bax (2015)
- Elle (2016)
- Brimstone (2016)
- Instinct (2019)
- The Informer (2019)
- Benedetta (2021)
- Nr. 10 (2021)
- The Watchers (2024)
- Panda Bear in Africa (2024)

== Awards ==
- Golden Calf Best Editing 2010 for Tirza (2010)
- International Cinephile Society Award Best Editing for Elle (2016)
