= Annet Malherbe =

Dutch actress (born 1957)

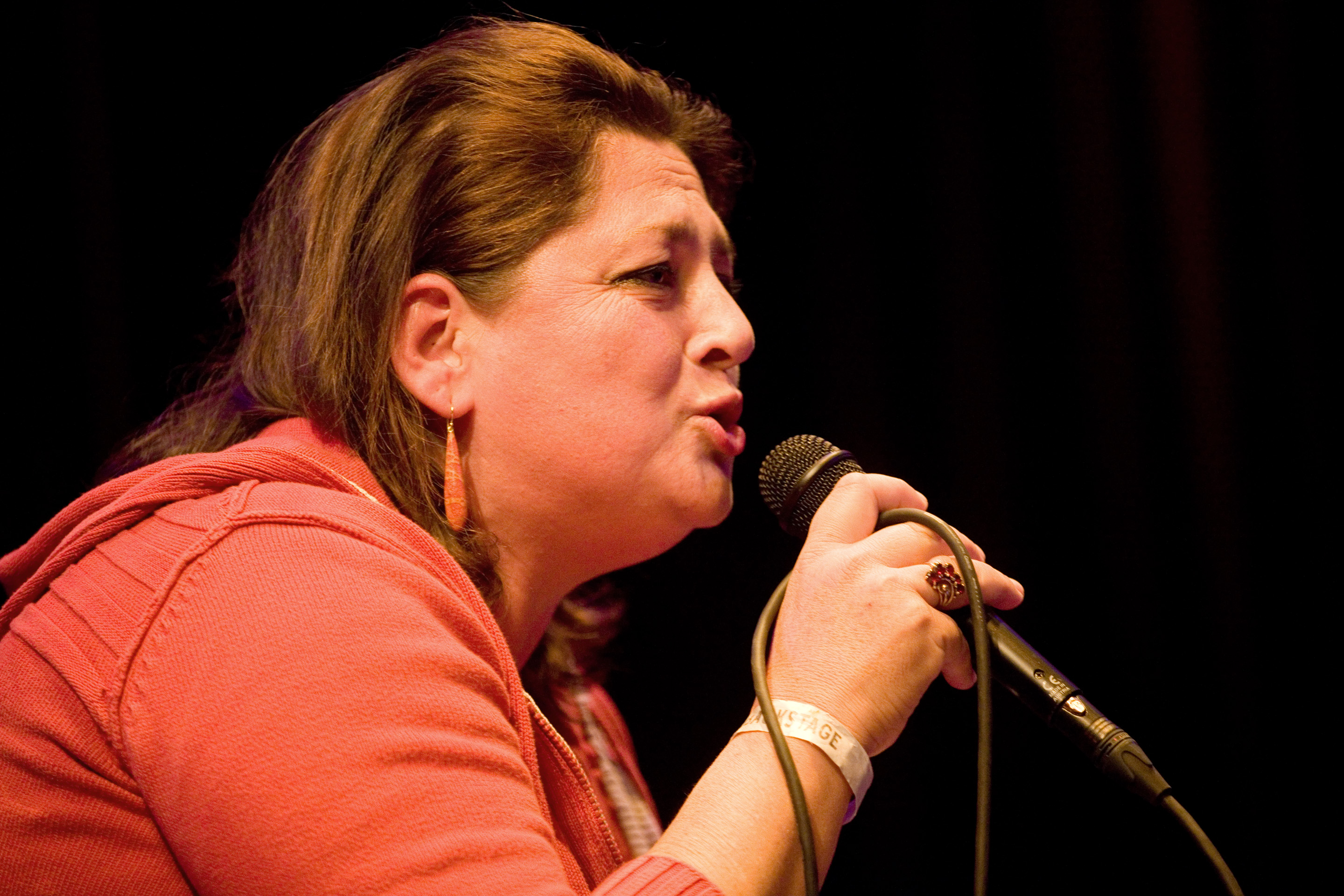
- Malherbe in 2011
- Born: Annet Malherbe; 23 November 1957 (age 68); Rotterdam, Netherlands
- Occupation: Actress
- Years active: 1986–present
- Spouse: Alex van Warmerdam
- Children: 2

Annet Malherbe (born 23 November 1957) is a Dutch actress. She is known for her roles in films directed by her husband Alex van Warmerdam, such as Voyeur, The Northerners, The Dress, Little Tony and Grimm. Malherbe was nominated for European Film Award for Best Actress for Little Tony.

In January 2012, it was confirmed Malherbe, Kasper van Kooten, Marcel Musters and Jelka van Houten would be the stars of a new RTL 4 sketch show, What If?.

== Personal life ==
Malherbe has been married to actor, filmmaker and musician Alex van Warmerdam, and appeared in five out of six films he directed — Voyeur (1986), The Northerners (1992), The Dress (1996), Little Tony (1998), Grimm (2003) and The Last Days of Emma Blank (2009). They have two children — Mees and Houk, who are also actors.

In 2010, Malherbe confessed she had had problems with depression in the past.

== Filmography ==
Title	Original Title	Year	Role	Notes
Voyeur	Abel	1986	Zus	
Children of Waterland	Kinderen van Waterland	1990	Moeder Leemhuis	TV series; 3 episodes
Jiskefet	Jiskefet	1990	Juffrouw Jannie	TV series; 1990–97
12 Cities, 13 Accidents	12 steden, 13 ongelukken	1991	Lilly	TV series; 1 episode
The Northerners	De Noorderlingen	1992	Martha	
The Betrayed	Op afbetaling	1993	Mien	TV film
Sparrow	Mus	1993	Mus	TV series
Called to the Bar	Pleidooi	1993	Abdis	TV series; 1 episode
Reunion	Reünie	1994		TV film
Erotic Tales: The Waiting Room	De wachtkamer	1995	The Wife	Short Film
The Dress	De jurk	1996	Ordinary Woman	
At the End of the Asparagus Time	Aan het eind van de aspergetijd	1997	Francien	TV film
Unit 13	Unit 13	1998	Prison Director	TV series; 1 episode
Zealandish Girl	Zeeuws meisje	1998		TV series
Little Tony	Kleine Teun	1998	Keet	
The Flying Liftboy	Abeltje	1998	Moeder Roef / Mrs. Chockle-Smith	
Old Money	Oud Geld	1999	Ank	TV series; 2 episodes
Deer	Hertenkamp	1999	Nilgun	TV series
Zus & Zo	Zus & Zo	2001	Annet	
Miss Minoes	Minoes	2001	Jakkepoes	Voice
Loonies	Loenatik de Moevie	2002	Farmer Woman	
Fate	Lot	2003		Short Film
Grimm	Grimm	2003	Farmer's Wife	
Sea of Silence	Verder dan de maan	2003	Aunt Masha	
Two Dreams	Twee dromen	2004	Wardrobe Woman	TV film
Ibbetlje	Ibbeltje	2004	Moeder	TV series
Fine Women	Gooische Vrouwen	2005	Willemijn Lodewijkx	TV series; 2005–07
Traceless Disappeared	Spoorloos verdwenen	2006	Petra de Wit	TV series; 1 episode
SEXTet	SEXtet	2007	Marie-Lou	
's Free Schaep	't Vrije Schaep	2009	Dolly	TV series; 1 episode
The Last Days of Emma Blank	De laatste dagen van Emma Blank	2009	Bella	
Fuchsia the Mini-Witch	Foeksia de Miniheks	2010	Juf Minuul	
Zieleman	Zieleman	2011	Edna	TV film
De Marathon	De Marathon	2012	Nel	
Borgman	Borgman	2013	Brenda	
Schneider vs. Bax	Schneider vs. Bax	2015	Gina	

== Awards and nominations ==
Award	Year	Category	Nominated work	Results
European Film Awards	1998	Best Actress	Little Tony	Nominated
Nederlands Film Festival Awards	1994	Best Actress in a TV Drama	Mus	Nominated
Nederlands Film Festival Awards	1998	Best Actress	Little Tony	Nominated
Nederlands Film Festival Awards	1999	Best Actress	The Flying Liftboy	Nominated
Picture and Sound Awards	2007	Best Actress	Fine Women	Nominated
Picture and Sound Awards	2008	Best Actress	Fine Women	Won
