= History's Future =

2016 film

- Film poster
- Directed by: Fiona Tan
- Written by: Fiona Tan
- Starring: Mark O'Halloran
- Distributed by: Cinéart
- Release dates: 27 January 2016 (Rotterdam IFF); 24 March 2016 (Netherlands)
- Running time: 95 minutes
- Country: Netherlands
- Language: Dutch

History's Future is a 2016 Dutch drama film directed by Fiona Tan. It was listed as one of eleven films that could be selected as the Dutch submission for the Best Foreign Language Film at the 89th Academy Awards, but it was not nominated.

== Cast ==
- Mark O'Halloran as MP
- Denis Lavant as Lottery Ticket Seller
- Anne Consigny as Caroline
- Hristos Passalis as Yorgos
- Manjinder Virk as Phoebe
- Rifka Lodeizen as Anna
- Brian Gleeson as Driver
- Johanna ter Steege as Therapist
