= Motherland: Fort Salem =

2020 American supernatural drama television series

- Also known as: Fort Salem
- Genre: Drama; Supernatural
- Created by: Eliot Laurence
- Starring: Taylor Hickson; Amalia Holm; Demetria McKinney; Jessica Sutton; Ashley Nicole Williams; Lyne Renée (Note: Lyne Renée is credited as "guest starring" in season 1 but is included with the series regulars in the front credits.)
- Music by: Brandon Roberts
- Country of origin: United States
- Original language: English
- No. of seasons: 3
- No. of episodes: 30

Production
- Executive producers: Steven A. Adelson; Will Ferrell; Adam McKay; Kevin Messick; Eliot Laurence; Maria Maggenti; Bryan Q. Miller; Erin Maher; Kay Reindl; Amanda Tapping; Brian Studler (Note: Studler is credited as producer for seasons 1–2.); Tracey Jeffrey
- Producers: Heather Thomason; Joe DeOliveira; Kurt Moritz
- Production location: Vancouver, British Columbia
- Cinematography: Jon Joffin; Michael Wale; Stephen Jackson; Craig Powell; Brian Whittred
- Editors: Christopher S. Capp; Avi Youabian; Jered Zalman; Gena Bleier; Matthew Gilna; David Abramson; Robert Komatsu; Misha Syeed
- Running time: 41–51 minutes
- Production companies: Gary Sanchez Productions; Hyperobject Industries; Well Underway

Original release
- Network: Freeform
- Release: March 18, 2020 – August 23, 2022

Motherland: Fort Salem is an American supernatural drama television series created by Eliot Laurence that premiered on Freeform on March 18, 2020. The series stars Taylor Hickson as Raelle Collar, Jessica Sutton as Tally Craven, and Ashley Nicole Williams as Abigail Bellweather, three witches conscripted into the U.S. Army. In August 2021, the series was renewed for a third and final season which premiered on June 21, 2022, and concluded on August 23, 2022.

== Premise ==
Motherland: Fort Salem follows Raelle Collar, Abigail Bellweather, and Tally Craven, three witches who accept conscription into the U.S. Army. They train in combat magic and use their vocal cords to enact "seeds" or "seed sounds", layering vocal sounds to create powerful spells. The series takes place in a women-dominated world in which the U.S. ended the persecution of witches 300 years ago during the Salem witch trials after an agreement known as the Salem Accord. The world finds itself at odds with a terrorist organization known as the Spree, a witch resistance group fighting against the conscription of witches.

== Cast and characters ==
=== Main ===
- Taylor Hickson as Raelle Collar, a witch from a minor witch family line who enlists at Fort Salem, but who shows a surprising potential for work. Her mother was killed in combat while her father is revealed to be a civilian, something deeply frowned upon.
- Amalia Holm as Scylla, a second-year cadet at Fort Salem whom Raelle falls for, but who is evasive about her past. It is later revealed her surname is Ramshorn. Her parents were killed for being dodgers, an illegal act of avoiding military conscription.
- Demetria McKinney as Anacostia Quartermaine, a tough drill sergeant at Fort Salem
- Jessica Sutton as Tally Craven, a witch who enthusiastically enlists at Fort Salem despite her mother's opposition due to all of Tally's aunts being previously killed in action
- Ashley Nicole Williams as Abigail Bellweather, a proud enlistee at Fort Salem from the storied Bellweather witch family line
- Lyne Renée as Sarah Alder (seasons 2–3; recurring season 1), the commanding general of the United States' witch armed forces and the leader of Fort Salem. She is hundreds of years old, having negotiated the Salem Accords 300 years ago, but appears to be a woman in her 40s in the present day.

=== Recurring ===
- Catherine Lough Haggquist as Petra Bellweather, an ambitious, proud, by-the-book general in the U.S. armed forces as chief intelligence officer and Abigail's mother
- Diana Pavlovska as Willa Collar, Raelle's mother who was reportedly killed in combat before Raelle enlisted
- Hrothgar Mathews as Edwin Collar, Raelle's father
- Annie Jacob as Glory Moffett (season 1), a meek enlistee at Fort Salem and a friend of Tally's
- Sarah Yarkin as Libba Swythe (season 1), a pugnacious enlistee at Fort Salem whose family has a long-standing feud with the Bellweathers
- Sheryl Lee Ralph as Kelly Wade, the United States president and civilian head of the U.S. government, and thus Alder's superior; she and Alder clash over tactics and military operations.
- Kai Bradbury as Gerit Buttonwood (season 1), a young male witch who visits Fort Salem and soon catches Tally's attention
- Emilie Leclerc as Izadora, a scientist, Necro teacher, and officer at Fort Salem
- Tony Giroux as Adil, a member of the nomadic tribe of witches known as the Tarim, who brings his sister Khalida to Fort Salem for treatment when she becomes mortally ill from an infection
- Kylee Brown as Khalida, a member of the nomadic Tarim tribe and Adil's younger sister who is brought to Fort Salem for treatment of an unknown infection that threatens her life
- Victor Webster as Blanton Silver (seasons 2–3), the vice president of the United States of America
- Arlen Aguayo-Stewart as Nicte Batan (seasons 2–3), who is a witch sergeant from Alder's past, and who has a surprising connection to events in the present. Various actresses have played Nicte when she is magically disguised, including Kandyse McClure in the third season.
- Mellany Barros as Penelope Silver (seasons 2–3), Vice President Blanton Silver's daughter, who is recently discovered to be a witch
- Ess Hödlmoser as M (seasons 2–3), a coven leader / sergeant at War College who undertakes the next level of training for Raelle, Tally and Abigail.
- Praneet Akilla as Gregorio (season 2; guest, season 3), a prospective match for Abigail
- Bob Frazer as Alban Hearst (seasons 2–3), a high-ranking member of the Camarilla
- Sandra Ferens as Quinn (seasons 2–3), a friend of Willa Collar's from the army, and Raelle's godmother, who lives in the Cession
- Liza Huget as Minerva Bellweather (seasons 2–3), the formidable mother of Petra Bellweather, and Abigail's grandmother
- Luc Roderique as Sterling Woodlot (seasons 2–3), a member of VP Silver's staff and friend and former lover of Anacostia's
- Emilie Ullerup as Kara Brandt (season 3), a wealthy woman who is financing VP Silver's and the Camarilla's efforts to wipe out witches once and for all
- Michael Horse as the Marshal (season 3), the lead witch-hunter in the Cession
- Aaron Douglas as Colonel Jarrett (season 3), of the non-witch military, who is sent by President Silver to "monitor" events at Fort Salem
- Olivia Lucas as Thelma Bearkiller (season 3), a member of the Cession council who is at first skeptical of the claims of the Bellweather unit

=== Guest ===
- Jillian Fargey as May Craven, Tally's mother, who doesn't want Tally to join the army (in "Say the Words", "My Witches", "Book Club")
- Nick E. Tarabay as Witchfather, the male head of the witch armed forces (in "A Biddy's Life", "Hail Beltane", "Mother Mycelium")
- Bernadette Beck as Charvel Bellweather, Abigail's cousin who is about to get married (in "Bellweather Season", "Brianna's Favorite Pencil")
- Naiah Cummins as Bridey, a tough soldier that Petra Bellweather assigns as Abigail's bodyguard after a bloody attack on the Bellweathers (in "Up Is Down", "Witchbomb")
- Marci T. House as the Imperatrix, who is in charge of researching and maintaining witches' magical bloodlines (in "A Tiffany")

== Episodes ==
=== Series overview ===
Season	Episodes	Originally released	
Season	Episodes	First released	Last released
1	10	March 18, 2020	May 20, 2020
2	10	June 22, 2021	August 24, 2021
3	10	June 21, 2022	August 23, 2022

=== Season 1 (2020) ===
No. overall	No. in season	Title	Directed by	Written by	Original release date	U.S. viewers (millions)
1	1	"Say the Words"	Steven A. Adelson	Eliot Laurence	March 18, 2020	0.462
A woman, part of a group called The Spree, attacks a mall, killing thousands of people before burning off her face, revealing someone else. Raelle is a young witch who can heal by transferring injuries to herself. She, along with two other girls, Abigail and Tally, is conscripted to serve in the army. At Fort Salem, General Sarah Alder and Sergeant Anacostia Quartermaine welcome the new recruits. Raelle is assigned to the same unit as Tally and Abigail, but clashes with the latter. Later, Tally reveals she voluntarily served, feeling it was her duty, and Raelle discusses her mother's death. Later, Raelle meets Scylla, another cadet. Abigail scolds Raelle for not taking their job seriously. After training, Raelle runs into Scylla and learns she is a necro; they take salva, allowing them to fly, before being caught. Anacostia then warns Scylla to stay away from Raelle. Abigail asks to be reassigned, but Alder refuses. Raelle discovers her mother blamed Abigail's mother, Petra, for their situation and confronts Abigail about it. Tally is angry at Abigail for requesting reassignment. Raelle gets advice from Scylla and the two have sex. Abigail later apologizes to Raelle. Scylla, in her room, gets warning Raelle is approaching and burns off the face of the woman from the mall attack before Raelle arrives and they kiss.
2	2	"My Witches"	Steven A. Adelson	Eliot Laurence	March 25, 2020	0.379
In Scylla's room, Raelle asks her about her family, but receives vague answers before being late for inspection and is assigned to guard duty. Alder updates the president on what they know about the Spree's latest attacks. Tally runs into an old friend. Alder and Anacostia talk about the president's visit and Alder expresses interest in the Bellweather unit. In training, Abigail runs into Libba, a family rival. The girls learn windshear, a shield created through vocalization. At guard duty, Raelle meets Helen Graves, a necro, and learns that Scylla's parents were killed for being draft dodgers. After Raelle leaves, it's revealed that Helen was actually Scylla. After demonstrating well in practice, several units, including Abigail's, go to the Pageant in Salem Town and enjoy unsupervised time off base. A group manages to track down some members of the Spree, but they are killed; its then suggested more extreme measures be used to take down the Spree. Scylla meets up with Raelle, and they take a walk in the woods, talk about death, before kissing. At a pizza place, the Spree attack, and Tally use her powers against a man who berates her. It's later revealed that the attack was a prank. It's then revealed Scylla is tasked with bringing Raelle to the Spree.
3	3	"A Biddy's Life"	Amanda Tapping	Brian Studler	April 1, 2020	0.341
The women at Fort Salem welcome the male cadets, led by Witchfather, where Abigail's friend Gerit catches Tally's eye. The Spree attack a pool, freezing it over and killing everyone. The women prepare for Beltane, a celebration honoring sexuality. Scylla's ex-boyfriend Porter shows up and warns Raelle to not get too attached. Alder and the other nations' military generals discuss the Spree's escalating violence. It's revealed a nomadic tribe with unique harmonics were discovered and they are in danger because of their resistance to militarization. Gerit and Tally start connecting, and later kiss. Alder falls ill and starts de-aging. Tally, Gerit and Raelle walk around the Memorial Wall. Gerit assures Tally she made the right decision enlisting. Abigail catches Libba telling a lie about a battle involving their families. Scylla and Raelle explore the museum before Porter shows up. Scylla tells her that she and Porter's families were dodgers, which got her parents killed, and was the reason she enlisted. Porter visits Scylla and accuses her of being a member of Spree. She strongly denies it, then kisses him, and she whispers in his ear. It's learned Alder maintains youthfulness by gaining it through a younger witch who gives her their own. Raelle witnesses Porter fall to his death, and is injured trying to save him.
4	4	"Hail Beltane"	Haifaa Al Mansour	Christopher Oscar Peña	April 8, 2020	0.245
Petra and Alder consider the possibility of Porter's death not being a suicide. Getting ready for Beltane, a bird from Gerit delivers a note to Tally. The Necros are tasked with speaking with Porter and finding out how he died. Petra tells Abigail to bring her unit to her cousins' wedding as the dean of the War College will be there. The women receive scourge whips from the men. Raelle starts to have visions of Porter's death. Porter's friend Bryon thanks Raelle for trying to save him, and reveals Porter saw Scylla the night he died. Scylla tries to discourage Raelle from investigating further. The Beltane dance pairs Abigail with two men, Tally with Gerit, and Raelle with Bryon, who just talk. Speaking to Porter reveals he committed suicide and that Witch Father was the last person he saw. Anacostia and Petra check mirrors for signs of the Spree, but find nothing. After Beltane, Scylla lies to Raelle about why she saw Porter. She admits her feelings for Raelle and they kiss. With the men leaving Fort Salem, Raelle is given Porter's scourge. Scylla is threatened by a Spree member to get herself invited to the Bellweather wedding.
5	5	"Bellweather Season"	MJ Bassett	Joy Kecken	April 15, 2020	0.289
The unit discusses the wedding of Abigail's cousin, Charvel, which she says Scylla cannot attend. Upsetting Raelle, she storms out and meets Scylla to gives her a present. Scylla is threatened to get herself into the wedding, so she disguises herself and burns it off once inside. Everyone attending watches the wedding. Afterwards, Anacostia overhears people talking about how Alder is handling the Spree situation before scolding Scylla for attending uninvited. Tally notices Gerit at the wedding, and is heartbroken when she discovers he is engaged. Abigail is disheartened to discover the Dean only cares about her last name. Raelle confronts Petra about her mother's death, but Petra compliments her mother. Abigail helps Charvel change and they discuss War College. Tally discovers Scylla is Spree and tells Anacostia. Scylla chooses to dance with Raelle instead of delivering her and tells her that she loves her. Abigail checks on Charvel, but discovers her dead in the bathroom. Balloons appear in the air and the wedding goes on lockdown. Abigail and her mother fight against two Spree members before they set themselves on fire. The unit reunites as Raelle realizes that Scylla is missing.
6	6	"Up is Down"	Rebecca Johnson	Maria Maggenti	April 22, 2020	0.324
Abigail recounts what happened at the wedding. The necros discover some 'civilians' who were killed at the same time as Charvel were actually Bellweathers. The group learns how to use salva. Raelle confronts Anacostia about looking for Scylla whilst Tally confronts Abigail about being 'okay'. After, Abigail's mother assigns her a bodyguard, Bridey. Raelle sneaks into the necro area looking for Scylla, but is informed that she's dead. Abigail breaks down with Bridey. Tally is informed by Anacostia to not tell Raelle about Scylla. Abigail is awoken by a nightmare, but tries to pass it off as a leg cramp. After, Raelle receives a sign from Scylla that she may be alive. During training, the unit discusses their grief, with Raelle running back to their room. Following training, Tally and Abigail are unable to find their salva or Raelle, who has taken it to try and find Scylla. They convince Bridey to take them to the nearby beach, where they find Raelle and comfort her. Scylla is revealed to have been taken prisoner by Fort Salem. A young man named Adil from the Tarim tribe goes to Fort Salem to get help for his sister, Khalida, and clashes with Alder over their use of seed sounds.
7	7	"Mother Mycelium"	Shannon Kohli	Nicole Avenia & Nikki McCauley	April 29, 2020	0.243
Anacostia attempts to interrogate Scylla about the attacks. The head necro teacher Izadora teaches the witches about Linking, a healing exercise that syncs bodily functions, and Raelle accidentally knocks the other cadets unconscious with her Work. Abigail befriends Adil and the two form feelings for each other, but he rebukes her patriotism by pointing out that the weather the Army fights with negatively affects his people. After many unsuccessful attempts by the Fixers to heal Khalida, Adil brings her to Raelle, who succeeds, but notices that the illness has not transferred to her. Izadora notices the same illness has instead infected the Mycelium. Anacostia again interrogates Scylla, using Raelle to make her vulnerable, and discovers through their Link that the Spree are stationed at an armory. Alder asks Khalida to show her Tarim seed sounds, but the latter refuses and attacks her. A training simulation called Citydrop begins.
8	8	"Citydrop"	David Grossman	Eli Edelson & Joy Kecken	May 6, 2020	0.267
When the witches land from the combat drop, Tally breaks her leg. Raelle heals her, but accidentally views her memories of the wedding, finding out that Tally reported Scylla to Anacostia. Horrified, she runs away. That night, Raelle sneaks off and encounters Helen Graves, the soldier from guard duty, but Helen does not recognize her or recall their conversation. General Alder sends a strike team to the armory, but it explodes and they lose surveillance. She realizes that the Spree are planning to bomb the airport using armored trucks, and that none of the other strike teams are close enough to intercept. She decides to use Anacostia and the cadets, much to the reluctance of her subordinates, and Citydrop ends early. On the helicopter ride over, Abigail and Libba somewhat make amends. The cadets are able to destroy the first truck, but Tally, using her Sight, reports civilian hostages inside the second truck. Alder tells them to proceed anyway. They destroy the second truck, but many of the cadets are injured, and Libba is killed by a piece of debris. Back on base, the cadets watch a televised statement from Alder, who lies and says the Spree, rather than the Army, were responsible for the hostage deaths.
9	9	"Coup"	Steven A. Adelson	Teleplay by : Eliot Laurence; Story by : Maria Maggenti	May 13, 2020	0.257
A team of soldiers find Tarim corpses in the mountains with their voice boxes cut out. Izadora proposes that the attackers are not the Spree, but an ancient enemy called the Camarilla, but Alder dismisses the idea as speculation. Due to Tally's insistence, the unit informs Petra that Scylla is being held captive on base. At Libba's memorial service, Abigail improvises her eulogy, saying she regrets engaging in the generational feud with Libba and acknowledging that Libba made her a better soldier. Scylla asks Anacostia to see Raelle in exchange for information. When Raelle visits, she demands to know why she was chosen as a target, and Scylla tearfully confesses that she chose to keep Raelle from the Spree. President Wade berates Alder about her choice to deploy untrained cadets and demotes her; however Alder uses Work to "Puppet" the president and grant herself full military authorization. Anacostia witnesses this and warns the unit to be careful as they are indirectly involved in Alder's actions.
10	10	"Witchbomb"	Steven A. Adelson	Eliot Laurence	May 20, 2020	0.313
At a soccer game, a Spree agent warns the military with the phrase "our ancient enemy has returned." During graduation, the unit is shocked to find that they have been enlisted for early deployment. Petra offers Abigail solo entry into War College, but Abigail sneaks away and joins Tally and Raelle instead. Scylla and Anacostia bond over memories of their respective parents. The strike team finds the Tarim hiding in a cave, where Adil demonstrates his unique ability to manipulate the earth, and Raelle heals the sick. On base, Anacostia breaks Scylla out of prison by allowing the latter to steal her appearance. When the strike team exit with the remaining Tarim, the Camarilla reveal themselves and attack. Two of Alder's Biddies are killed, and Tally offers herself as a replacement. In the chaos of their evacuation, Raelle is fatally wounded. Abigail Links with her, but ends up dying as well, and the rest of the crew are forced to leave them behind. A sudden blast erupts from the pair's joined hands and they begin to walk, somehow alive through their newfound power. Having successfully escaped, Scylla finds a safe house, where it is revealed that Raelle's mother Willa is alive and a member of the Spree.

=== Season 2 (2021) ===
No. overall	No. in season	Title	Directed by	Written by	Original release date	U.S. viewers (millions)
11	1	"Of the Blood"	Amanda Tapping	Eliot Laurence	June 22, 2021	0.257
During a church ceremony, a choir girl melts the stained glass windows behind her while singing, unintentionally exposing herself as a witch. Willa tells Scylla that the Camarilla killed half of the Spree's leaders using a targeted plague, and recruits her to fight against them. Tally is given an opportunity to reverse her status as a Biddy, which she accepts upon learning that Abigail and Raelle are alive. The choir girl is revealed to be the vice president's daughter Penelope Silver, who is tested and confirmed as a witch. The unit gets into War College. Tally has a nightmare in which she fights alongside Alder in a jungle, where she is attacked by giant centipedes. She wakes up screaming and discovers strange bite marks on her body.
12	2	"Abomination"	Amanda Tapping	Brian Studler	June 29, 2021	0.153
After days of testing, Abigail and Raelle are unable to recreate the blast from their mission. The unit start War College and meet M, the leader of Sekhmet Company, and Gregorio Shellbark, Abigail's former Cavalier. Izadora examines a head from the Tarim site and witnesses Raelle's voice speaking from its mouth, indicating that she is connected to the Mycelium. Scylla attends a vigil for the mall attack she caused and runs into Bonnie and Shane, a couple working for the Camarilla, as well as an undercover Anacostia. The two reluctantly team up to infiltrate the Camarilla. Tally has another dream, this time featuring a witch with unique Work. During an exercise in their class about Off-Canon Work, Tally discovers that she can see sound waves, and Abigail and Raelle are taken and tested again by Izadora. It is revealed that the blast comes solely from Raelle. While tutoring Penelope, Tally notices a doctored photograph featuring the witch from her dreams, whom someone has tried to erase.
13	3	"A Tiffany"	Shannon Kohli	Kay Reindl & Erin Maher	July 6, 2021	0.186
Alder Pushes President Wade to open witch testing centers. The matrimonial season begins and the Sekhmet Company meets the Imperatrix, a woman responsible for pairing male and female witches together to produce powerful children. Both Abigail and Raelle resent this process, and when Raelle insults the Imperatrix, she does so in fluent Mothertongue, despite previously stating that she couldn't speak the language. She uses a Seed formerly used by Scylla to trigger the Mycelium, and later manages to blast through several concrete structures using the "Witchbomb." Abigail and Adil argue over the value of tradition. Anacostia and Scylla surveil a Camarilla member as he tests for witches in elementary schools using a sonic tone that negates Scylla's Work. Tally has another flashback of the redacted witch at a matrimonial reception. It is revealed that the witch's name is Nicte Batan, and that Alder used her Work to induce mass suicide in a rebel group. Determined to recreate her ancestor Jem's legendary Working, Abigail skips the matrimonial reception and attempts the Working herself. Though she succeeds, the effort of maintaining it is too much for her vocal cords, and Adil finds her bleeding from the mouth in the woods.
14	4	"Not Our Daughters"	Nimisha Mukerji	Bryan Q. Miller	July 13, 2021	0.153
Alder reprimands Petra and Anacostia for releasing Scylla and running an operation without her consent. Civilians gather to protest outside the first witch testing center, calling the movement "Not Our Daughters." Sekhmet Company is assigned to be Alder's security detail, with Tally escorting Penelope, who is there to demonstrate her abilities. Anacostia and Scylla meet up at the protests with Bonnie and Shane. Alder and Petra choose to cover up the Camarilla's involvement by blaming the Spree instead. The witches' Work is interfered with, and Abigail hears her dead cousin Charvel's voice coming from the crowd. She runs away from the rest of the company into a parking garage, only to be ambushed by a Camarilla member speaking through Charvel's voice box, as well as several others wearing sonic blockers. She destroys most of them but is eventually overpowered, and nearly has her own voice box cut out before Tally and M come to her rescue. A Camarilla bomb goes off at the protests. Raelle briefly sees Scylla as chaos ensues and the crowd scatters, and finds a photo of herself on the ground. Angry that the Army has covered up the Camarilla attacks, Tally storms into Alder's office unannounced and demands to know who Nicte Batan is.
15	5	"Brianna's Favorite Pencil"	Jason Stone	Nicole Avenia	July 20, 2021	0.136
While on a tour of India, Adil and Khalida narrowly escape an outbreak of the weaponized disease, dubbed "Witchplague." Alder tells Tally that Nicte deserted the Army and rejects her claims that they are still connected. The unit discuss how they celebrated Samhain growing up. Scylla and Anacostia attend a Camarilla event with Shane, where they discover that a young witch named Tiffany has been kidnapped for execution. Sekhmet Company participate in a Samhain ritual that allows them to communicate with a dead witch when they successfully complete it. Tally summons a rebel leader from the conflict in her dreams, Abigail summons her cousin Charvel, and Raelle, unaware that her mother is alive, attempts to summon Willa and fails. Adil returns to base and reunites with Abigail, and the two decide to hunt down the Camarilla themselves. After rescuing Tiffany, Scylla, disguised as Bonnie, murders Shane before the real Bonnie comes home.
16	6	"My 3 Dads"	Jem Garrard	Eli Edelson	July 27, 2021	0.182
A mysterious woman rallies Spree agents in a cabin. Over the break, Raelle brings Tally home to her home in the Cession, while Abigail brings Adil to her family estate in Maryland to retrieve some of Charvel's blood. However, Abigail's parents (including her three fathers) have invited male witches to the home for Abigail's handfasting. After a disagreement with Anacostia, Scylla abandons their partnership and takes Tiffany to Willa, who Links with Tiffany and learns that the Camarilla are keeping more young witches in a veterinarian's office. Tally and Raelle visit Quinn, Willa's former best friend. As Quinn talks about her service, Tally deduces that Nicte founded the Spree after deserting the Army. After the handfasting dinner, Petra scolds Abigail for refusing the process, but Abigail's grandmother Minerva encourages her to leave and make her own legacy. The woman in the cabin, revealed to be Nicte herself, attempts to kill Alder by using Sympathetic Work and killing a Spree agent in her place, which only fails because her Biddies share the damage. Willa and Scylla break into the vet's office and find the young witches, but they also find Raelle's picture on a wall, indicating that she is their next target. As they realize that they are too late, Camarilla agents in the Cession kidnap Raelle.
17	7	"Irrevocable"	Shannon Kohli	KD Dávila & Will J. Watkins	August 3, 2021	0.210
Raelle wakes up on a surgical table, where a Camarilla surgeon is planning to harvest her voice box. Adil uses Charvel's blood to create a "blood compass" which shows the location of Charvel's missing vocal cords. When the surgeons attempt to cut out Raelle's throat, the Witchbomb kills one of them and Raelle enters a "death dream" inside the Mycelium, after which the Witchbomb resurrects her. Abigail and Adil get into a fight with civilians in a diner and Adil breaks his oath of pacifism, which deeply troubles him. Willa and Scylla break into another Camarilla facility to rescue more witch children. The surgeon crushes Raelle to death beneath a boulder in front of the children, hoping that the Witchbomb will lash out and kill them along with her, but they remain unharmed and Raelle is again resurrected. Abigail and Adil also break in and fight off the Camarilla, and Abigail takes back Charvel's voice box. Realizing that Raelle cannot die, the surgeon infects her with Witchplague, which she cannot fight off. Upon finding Raelle, Willa asks Scylla to tell Raelle that she loves her, and sacrifices herself by transferring the Witchplague to her own body. Scylla and Abigail free Raelle and escape with the young witches, and Adil destroys the Camarilla facility from afar. Back on base, Alder is attacked again using Sympathetic Work, but Tally uses her Sight to identify a Biddy who is working for the Spree, briefly seeing Nicte through the traitor's eyes.
18	8	"Delusional"	Kimani Ray Smith	Kay Reindl & Erin Maher	August 10, 2021	0.211
Alder orders Tally and the unit on a mission to eliminate Nicte, but Petra secretly orders Tally to capture her alive instead. Scylla and Raelle reconcile and Scylla insists on coming along for the mission. When they land, Nicte's Work makes the strike team hallucinate— Raelle nearly slits her own throat, Tally tries to strangle herself, and Abigail almost succumbs to Jem's tornado Working when she loses control of it. Scylla pulls each of them out, but the other soldiers kill themselves. When the four of them find Nicte's cabin, her Work pushes them to fight each other. Tally leaves, but runs into Nicte, who attacks her. However, when the rest of the unit arrive, they find Tally standing over an unconscious Nicte. They capture her, and before they leave, Raelle and Scylla kiss. The unit arrive back on base, where Tally suddenly tries to attack Alder. When they subdue her, they discover that Tally is actually Nicte in disguise, and that the latter stole Tally's face during their struggle.
19	9	"Mother of All, Mother of None"	David Frazee	Bryan Q. Miller	August 17, 2021	0.161
With President Wade watching, Alder attempts to interrogate Nicte, who insists that she will only take questions from Tally. Nicte reveals to Tally that the Spree kills one civilian for every witch that dies in combat, and openly admits that she used her Work to start the Spree. Wade again reprimands Alder for her decisions and orders her to step down after Nicte's execution. The Mycelium shows Raelle a vision of Her creation, revealing that She is made of dead witches and is a result of Alder's grief. Just as Nicte is about to be executed, Tally invokes Rite of Proxy, an underutilized military clause that allows her to be executed in Nicte's place. When Alder hesitates to harm her, Tally provokes her into a duel, which she swiftly loses. However, Raelle also invokes Rite of Proxy, followed by Abigail, Gregorio, and M. Together, they force Alder to admit her wrongs and she steps down voluntarily, sparing Nicte's life in the process. A camera crew comes on base to film Penelope. Later, as the unit is discussing what will become of the future, an alarm goes off on base and an outbreak of Witchplague begins to spread.
20	10	"Revolution, Part 1"	Amanda Tapping	Eliot Laurence & Brian Studler	August 24, 2021	0.145
As the Witchplague spreads, Tally discovers a tone that destroys the Camarilla's sonic blockers, which is used in other parts of the base. Anacostia and Alder fight more Camarilla, but all of Alder's Biddies are killed, causing her age to rapidly return. Petra releases Nicte and they meet Camarilla surgeon Alban Hearst, who ominously states that the "union of Earth and Sky must be prevented at all costs." When the unit realizes that Penelope is the living source of the Witchplague, they have no other choice but to administer a coup de grâce using a combination of Raelle’s Witchbomb and Abigail's tornado Working. Afterwards, they give Alder to the Mycelium, issuing tearful goodbyes as they do so. Vice President Silver storms into Petra's office to arrest the unit for Penelope's murder. When Petra fails to get the charges dropped, she intercepts the unit on their way to Washington D.C. They escape on a bus along with Scylla, Nicte, Adil, and Khalida. It's revealed that a member of the camera crew was Alban Hearst, and that Vice President Silver is working with the Camarilla to become president. Meanwhile, at the heart of the Mycelium, Alder's body is restored.

=== Season 3 (2022) ===
No. overall	No. in season	Title	Directed by	Written by	Original release date	U.S. viewers (millions)
21	1	"Homo Cantus"	Amanda Tapping	Eliot Laurence	June 21, 2022	0.087
Several thousand years before the present day, six witch sisters create what is known as the First Song to bring the power of speech to man. In the present, the fugitive Bellweather Unit, along with Adil, Khalida, Scylla, and Nicte, are hiding with a community of Dodgers in a paper factory. Raelle and Scylla discuss running away together, while Nicte trains Tally on the roof to improve her Sight. When Abigail and Adil sneak out to make a phone call to Petra, they narrowly escape the Camarilla, who have improved their technology to disable the witches’ Work. Back on base, while inoculating cadets with a Witchplague vaccine, black rain begins to fall, and Izadora hears Penelope’s voice singing the hymn "How Great Thou Art." While continuing to train, Tally Sees a disfigured Nicte in her future and nearly falls off the roof, where someone spots her. This causes the Camarilla to investigate the factory, and despite a disguised Scylla’s efforts to distract them, they use their technology to see through a false wall and discover the Dodger camp. The Dodgers then abandon the factory, leaving the Unit on their own. In the mountains of Basque Country, Alder rematerializes to a Witch shepherd, who is singing a piece of the First Song to his flock.
22	2	"The Price of Work"	Amanda Tapping	Brian Studler	June 28, 2022	0.082
23	3	"Oh Elayne..."	Jem Garrard	Eli Edelson	July 5, 2022	0.113
24	4	"Happy Yule!"	Shannon Kohli	Nicole Avenia	July 12, 2022	0.070
25	5	"Cession in Session"	Jacquie Gould	Will J. Watkins	July 19, 2022	0.082
26	6	"Book Club"	Shannon Kohli	Nikki McCauley	July 26, 2022	0.067
27	7	"She Returns"	David Frazee	Eli Edelson & Cherie Dimaline	August 2, 2022	0.114
28	8	"Petra's Favorite Pen"	Jem Garrard	Nicole Avenia & Tom Hanada	August 9, 2022	0.118
29	9	"But I Don't Even Have A Dress..."	David Frazee	Brian Studler & Jeff Patneaude	August 16, 2022	0.103
30	10	"Revolution, Part 2"	Amanda Tapping	Eliot Laurence	August 23, 2022	0.098

== Production ==
=== Development ===
Development on the series began in August 2016 under the working title Motherland, and on June 5, 2018, a pilot had been ordered. On March 5, 2019, it was announced that Freeform had given the production a straight-to-series order for a first season consisting of ten episodes. The series was created by Eliot Laurence, who was also expected to executive produce alongside Will Ferrell, Adam McKay, Kevin Messick, Maria Maggenti, and Steven Adelson. The pilot was also directed by Adelson. Production companies involved with the series were slated to include Freeform Studios and Gary Sanchez Productions. On May 14, 2019, an official trailer for the series was released. The series premiered on March 18, 2020.

David J. Peterson along with Jessie Sams created the language known as Méníshè, which is spoken on the show by the Tarim, and is described as an "ancient witch language". Laurence and his team knew of Peterson from his previous work on Game of Thrones and hired him to create the language for the show.

On May 19, 2020, Freeform renewed the series for a second season, which premiered on June 22, 2021. On August 23, 2021, Freeform renewed the series for a third and final season, which premiered on June 21, 2022.

=== Casting ===
Alongside the initial series announcement, it was reported that Taylor Hickson, Jessica Sutton, Amalia Holm, and Demetria McKinney had been cast in series regular roles. Kelcey Mawema, one of the leads in the original pilot, was recast. On March 28, 2019, it was announced that Ashley Nicole Williams had replaced Kelcey Mawema. On August 9, 2019, it was announced that Bernadette Beck would be guest starring in the series. On September 24, 2019, it was announced that Kai Bradbury would be joining the cast in a recurring role. On January 28, 2020, Sarah Yarkin was cast in a recurring capacity. On May 19, 2020, Lyne Renée was promoted as a series regular for the second season. On May 27, 2021, Victor Webster, Mellany Barros, Praneet Akilla, Ess Hödlmoser and Arlen Aguayo were cast in recurring roles for the second season.

=== Filming ===
Filming for the pilot took place in July 2018. Principal photography for the first season began on April 22, 2019, and ended on August 23, 2019, in Vancouver, British Columbia. Filming took place in the Cloverdale area of Surrey, British Columbia, from May 9 to 10, 2019. Filming for the second season began on October 9, 2020, and concluded on April 1, 2021. Filming for the third season began on November 2, 2021, and concluded on April 14, 2022.

== International releases ==
Internationally, the show airs on Fox8 in Australia, streams on Showmax in South Africa, and is exclusive to BBC Three and BBC iPlayer in the United Kingdom under the title Fort Salem, to avoid confusion with the BBC sitcom Motherland.

As of November 20, 2020, it has been released by Amazon Prime in France, Germany, Italy, and Spain.

In Canada, Sweden, and Norway, Disney+ has the streaming distribution rights to the show.

== Music ==
The music for the series is scored by Brandon Roberts. The album for the first season was released on March 20, 2020.

Motherland: Fort Salem (Original Score)
No.	Title	Artist(s)	Length
1.	"Motherland: Fort Salem (Main Title)"	Brandon Roberts	1:11
2.	"The Spree"	Brandon Roberts	1:24
3.	"Blue Rose (Friendship Theme)"	Brandon Roberts	2:19
4.	"Raelle and Scylla"	Brandon Roberts	2:00
5.	"The Bellweather Legacy"	Brandon Roberts	1:27
6.	"Balloons!"	Brandon Roberts	3:00
7.	"Aftermath"	Brandon Roberts	1:29
8.	"Refugees"	Brandon Roberts	0:57
9.	"The Unbearable Sadness of Porter"	Brandon Roberts	1:53
10.	"Missing Salva"	Brandon Roberts	1:30
11.	"War College"	Brandon Roberts	1:19
12.	"Finding Raelle"	Brandon Roberts	2:02
13.	"Saving Khalida"	Brandon Roberts	2:05
14.	"Scylla Revealed"	Brandon Roberts	2:10
15.	"Truck Stop"	Brandon Roberts	2:43
16.	"Remembrance"	Brandon Roberts	1:22
17.	"Slaughter"	Brandon Roberts	2:12
18.	"One Less Witch in the World"	Brandon Roberts	1:23
19.	"Presidential Address"	Brandon Roberts	2:39
20.	"Mother and Daughter"	Brandon Roberts	1:20
21.	"the Camarilla"	Brandon Roberts	2:51
22.	"Witchbomb"	Brandon Roberts	0:53

== Reception ==
=== Critical response ===
On Rotten Tomatoes, the first season has an approval rating of 71% based on reviews from 17 critics, with an average rating of 6.4/10. The website's critical consensus states, "Despite a fine cast and impressive set up, Motherland: Fort Salem's ambitious ideas are overwhelmed by the sheer too-muchness of it all." On Metacritic, it has a weighted average score of 49 out of 100, based on reviews from 7 critics, indicating "mixed or average reviews".

=== Ratings ===
==== Season 1 ====
Viewership and ratings per episode of Motherland: Fort Salem
No.	Title	Air date	Rating (18–49)	Viewers (millions)	DVR (18–49)	DVR viewers (millions)	Total (18–49)	Total viewers (millions)
1	"Say the Words"	March 18, 2020	0.1	0.462	—N/a	—N/a	—N/a	—N/a
2	"My Witches"	March 25, 2020	0.1	0.379	0.1	—N/a	0.2	—N/a
3	"A Biddy's Life"	April 1, 2020	0.1	0.341	0.1	—N/a	0.2	—N/a
4	"Hail Beltane"	April 8, 2020	0.1	0.245	0.1	—N/a	0.2	—N/a
5	"Bellweather Season"	April 15, 2020	0.1	0.289	0.1	—N/a	0.2	—N/a
6	"Up is Down"	April 22, 2020	0.1	0.324	0.1	—N/a	0.2	—N/a
7	"Mother Mycelium"	April 29, 2020	0.1	0.243	0.1	—N/a	0.2	—N/a
8	"Citydrop"	May 6, 2020	0.1	0.267	0.1	—N/a	0.2	—N/a
9	"Coup"	May 13, 2020	0.1	0.257	—N/a	—N/a	—N/a	—N/a
10	"Witchbomb"	May 20, 2020	0.1	0.313	0.1	—N/a	0.2	—N/a

==== Season 2 ====
Viewership and ratings per episode of Motherland: Fort Salem
No.	Title	Air date	Rating (18–49)	Viewers (millions)	DVR (18–49)	DVR viewers (millions)	Total (18–49)	Total viewers (millions)
1	"Of the Blood"	June 22, 2021	0.1	0.257	0.1	0.332	0.2	0.589
2	"Abomination"	June 29, 2021	0.0	0.153	0.1	0.253	0.1	0.406
3	"A Tiffany"	July 6, 2021	0.1	0.186	0.1	0.251	0.2	0.437
4	"Not Our Daughters"	July 13, 2021	0.1	0.153	0.2	0.427	0.3	0.580
5	"Brianna's Favorite Pencil"	July 20, 2021	0.0	0.136	0.1	0.282	0.1	0.418
6	"My 3 Dads"	July 27, 2021	0.1	0.182	TBD	TBD	TBD	TBD
7	"Irrevocable"	August 3, 2021	0.1	0.210	TBD	TBD	TBD	TBD
8	"Delusional"	August 10, 2021	0.1	0.211	0.1	0.269	0.2	0.480
9	"Mother of All, Mother of None"	August 17, 2021	0.1	0.161	0.1	0.295	0.2	0.456
10	"Revolution, Part 1"	August 24, 2021	0.0	0.145	TBD	TBD	TBD	TBD

==== Season 3 ====
Viewership and ratings per episode of Motherland: Fort Salem
No.	Title	Air date	Rating (18–49)	Viewers (millions)	DVR (18–49)	DVR viewers (millions)	Total (18–49)	Total viewers (millions)
1	"Homo Cantus"	June 21, 2022	0.0	0.087	TBD	TBD	TBD	TBD
2	"The Price of Work"	June 28, 2022	0.0	0.082	TBD	TBD	TBD	TBD
3	"Oh Elayne"	July 5, 2022	0.1	0.113	TBD	TBD	TBD	TBD
4	"Happy Yule!"	July 12, 2022	0.0	0.070	TBD	TBD	TBD	TBD
5	"Cession in Session"	July 19, 2022	0.0	0.082	TBD	TBD	TBD	TBD
6	"Book Club"	July 26, 2022	0.0	0.067	TBD	TBD	TBD	TBD
7	"She Returns"	August 2, 2022	0.0	0.114	TBD	TBD	TBD	TBD
8	"Petra's Favorite Pen"	August 9, 2022	0.0	0.118	TBD	TBD	TBD	TBD
9	"But I Don't Even Have A Dress..."	August 16, 2022	0.0	0.103	TBD	TBD	TBD	TBD
10	"Revolution Part 2"	August 23, 2022	0.0	0.098	TBD	TBD	TBD	TBD

=== Accolades ===
Year	Award	Category	Nominee(s)	Result	Ref.
2021	American Society of Cinematographers	Outstanding Achievement in Cinematography in Episode of a One-Hour Television Series – Commercial	Jon Joffin	Won	
2021	Canadian Society of Cinematographers Awards	Best Cinematography in TV Drama – Commercial	Jon Joffin	Won	
2021	Leo Awards	Best Direction in a Dramatic Series	Steven A. Adelson	Nominated	
2021	ReFrame Stamp	IMDbPro Top 200 Scripted TV Recipients	Motherland: Fort Salem	Won	
2022	CAFTCAD Awards	Best Costume Design in TV Contemporary – West	Tracey Boulton, Eilidh McAllister, Monique McRae, Fiona Roberts, Petra Bergholz, Chantal Richard, Kathleen Mulder, Victoria McPhedran, Karilynn Ming Ho, Slavica Grkavac, Jacqueline Uthoff, Brooke Reid, Charron Hume, Alita Gorgichuk, Tassie Vicars, Ciara Brady, Sherry Randall, Christine Stansbery, Marie-Adeline Sekula, Ardyth Cleveland, Cadence Warner	Nominated	
2022	Leo Awards	Best Cinematography in a Dramatic Series	Craig Powell	Nominated	
2022	Leo Awards	Best Lead Performance by a Female in a Dramatic Series	Taylor Hickson	Nominated	
2022	Leo Awards	Best Sound Editing in a Dramatic Series	Jordan Sy, John Douglas Smith, Paula Fairfield	Nominated	
2023	CAFTCAD Awards	Best Costume Design in TV Contemporary – West	Tracey Boulton, Eilidh McAllister, Monique McRae, Kurtis Reeves, Sherry Randall, Petra Bergholz, Summer Eves-Sainaney, Charron Hume, Mhelanni Gorre, Emily Laing, Derek Perrett, Chelsea Alice, Tassie Vicars, Ciara Brady, Frances Sweeney, Jacqueline Uthoff, Shirley Chan, Susan Pajos, Cora Burnette, Lovisa Drever, Kyla Nesbitt, Lisa Price, Kathleen Mulder, Laura Zacher, Brooke Reid, Angela Bright	Nominated	
