= Bhai's Cafe =

- Poster
- Directed by: Maynard Kraak
- Written by: Darron Meyer; Aaron Naidoo
- Produced by: Razia Rawoot; Maynard Kraak; Mehboob Bawa
- Starring: Mehboob Bawa; Suraya Rose Santos; Siv Ngesi
- Cinematography: FW Stark
- Edited by: Cohen Lorenzo Davids
- Music by: Edward George King; Ravjive Mohan
- Production companies: Razia Bawa Productions; West Five Films; PostCity
- Release date: 15 July 2019; (Durban)
- Running time: 99 minutes
- Country: South Africa
- Language: English

Bhai's Cafe is a South African musical comedy-drama film shot in the style of a Bollywood film directed by Maynard Kraak from a screenplay by Darron Meyer and Aaron Naidoo. It premiered at the 2019 Durban International Film Festival. It had a brief theatrical release in February 2020 before moving to DStv Box Office when cinemas closed the following month.

== Premise ==
The film is set at a local café in Wynberg, Cape Town run by Bhai that comes under threat from a property developer, whose son catches the eye of his daughter.

== Cast ==
- Mehboob Bawa as Bhai
- Suraya Rose Santos as Rashmi
- Siv Ngesi as Patrick
- Rehane Abrahams as Mary
- Thabo Bopape as Lionel
- Farouk Valley-Omar as Chaganbhai
- Jessica Sutton as Stephanie
- Masali Baduza as Thandi
- Dillon Windvogel as Shamiel
- Elodie Venece as Veena
- Stavros Cassapis as Kabir

== Production ==
The story was the brainchild of Razia Rawoot and Mehboob Bawa, with the setting inspired by Bawa's memories of the corner shop in Claremont his family owned when he was growing up in Cape Town. Originally intended to be a sitcom, director Maynard Kraak introduced them to screenwriters Darron Meyer and Aaron Naidoo to help them turn it into a film. It was filmed on location in Cape Town.
