= Gaite Jansen =

Dutch actress (born 1991)

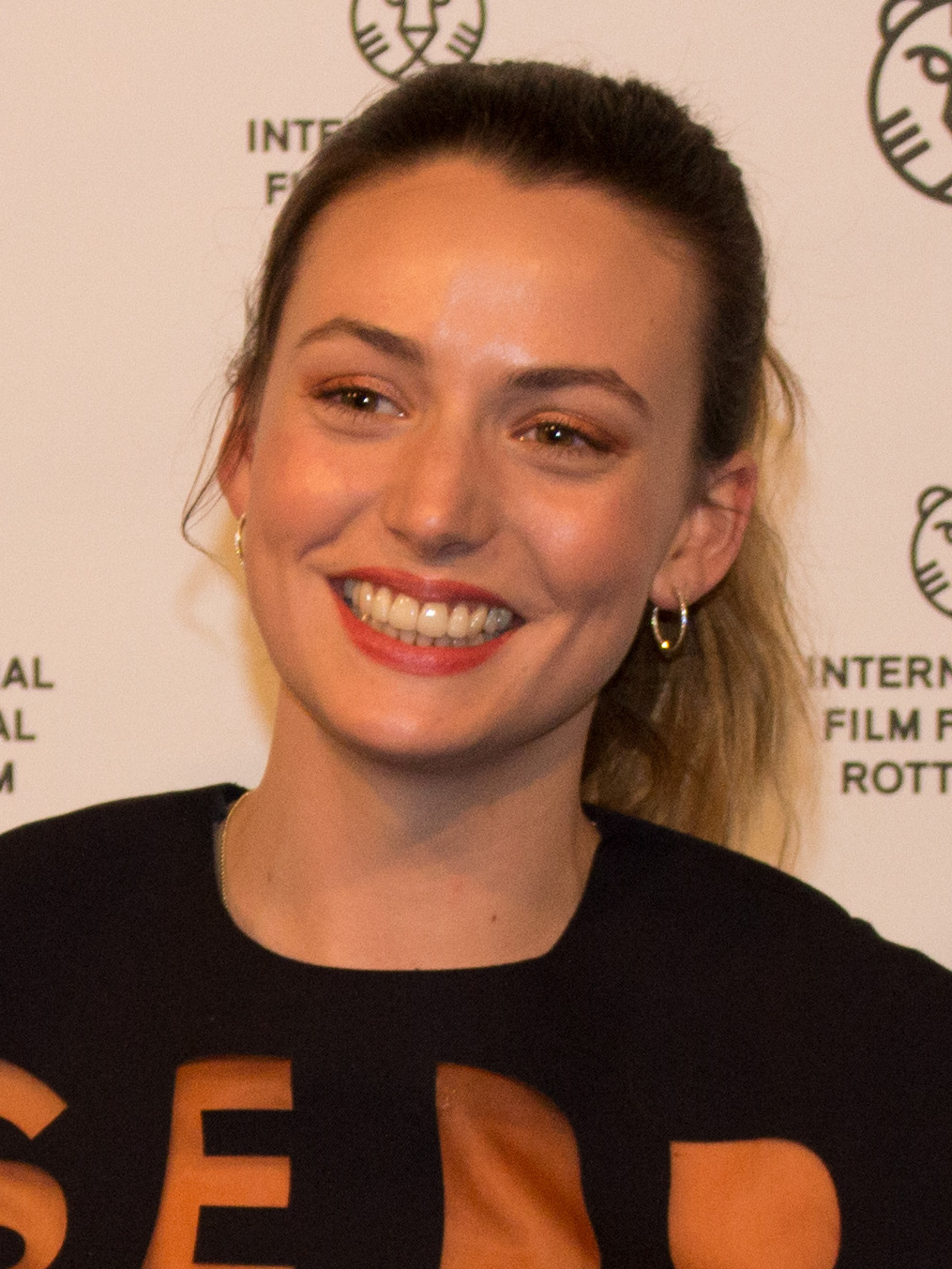
- Jansen in 2020
- Born: Gaite Sara Kim Jansen; 25 December 1991 (age 34); Rotterdam, Netherlands
- Occupation: Actress
- Years active: 2008–present

Gaite Sara Kim Jansen (born 25 December 1991) is a Dutch actress, singer, writer and director born in Rotterdam. Jansen was brought up in a family with a film background, which influenced her to pursue acting as a career. At the age of 12, Jansen was awarded the Best Actress Award at the 48 Hours Film Project.

== Life and career ==
Jansen received her professional training at the Maastricht Academy of Dramatic Arts.

At age 12, she was awarded the Best Actress Award at the 48 Hour Film Project in Amsterdam for her role in Luwte. Her performance as a troubled deaf teenager in the acclaimed arthouse film "170 Hz" (2011) earned her nominations for Best Actress at the Seattle Film Festival and the Netherlands Film Festival. The film Supernova, in which she plays the lead role, was selected for the Generations competition at Berlinale film festival 2014.

In 2014, Jansen made her stage debut at the prestigious Amsterdam Theatre Group, as Ophelia in Hamlet vs. Hamlet, directed by Guy Cassiers and played in Medea later that year.

In 2015, Jansen appeared as the lead role in the film Greenland. She played a suicidal girl in In Therapie, the Dutch version of BeTipul in 2010. She was nominated "best actress" at the Gouden Kalf awards in 2012 for her role in 170 Hz, where she played a deaf girl and conversed mostly in Dutch Sign Language.

Jansen also plays the role of Grand Duchess Tatiana Petrovna in the third season of the BBC gangster drama Peaky Blinders. In 2017, she appeared as Hana Raznikova in Line of Duty. She plays Phoenix in the Cinemax TV series Jett.

== Filmography ==
=== Film ===
Year	Title	Role	Notes
2009	Lover or Loser	Eva	
2009	Happy End	Mira	
2010	Dusk	Jessie	
2011	Sonny Boy	Bertha	
2011	170 Hz	Evy	
2011	Met Donker Thuis	Fleur	
2011	Lotus	Steintje	
2012	Tricked	Merel	
2012	Mike Says Goodbye!	Teacher	
2013	The Price of Sugar	Sarith	
2014	Supernova	Meis	
2016	In My Father's Garden	Johanna	
2021	Bo	Bo	
2023	Happy Ending	Luna	
2024	Krazy House	Sarah	
2024	Babygirl	Hedda Scarlett	
2026	PAAZ	Emma	

=== Television ===
Year	Title	Role	Notes
2008	Spangas	Noelle	10 episodes
2008	Flikken Maastricht	Marieke	Episode: "Angst"
2009	Coach	Sophie van Meeteren	TV movie
2009	Sorry minister	Nina Bijl	3 episodes
2010	In therapie	Sophie	3 episodes
2010	De co-assistent	Lisa	Episode: "Verliefd en verloren"
2011	A'dam - E.V.A.	Patricia	Episode: "Nachtschade"
2015	Groenland	Iris Samkalden	TV movie
2016	Peaky Blinders	Tatiana Petrovna	6 episodes
2017	Line of Duty	Hana Reznikova	3 episodes
2017	De 12 van Oldenheim	Suus Jonkers	4 episodes
2017–2020	Hollands Hoop	Talia Chanti	15 episodes
2018	Suspects	Tessa Boot	2 episodes
2018	Ik weet wie je bent	Anna van Leer	16 episodes
2019	Jett	Phoenix	9 episodes
2022	Leopard Skin	Batista 'Batty' Ferreira	8 episodes
2025	Jan Janszoon, piraat van de wereld	Liesbeth	4 episodes
