= 1-900 (film) =

- US DVD Cover
- Directed by: Theo Van Gogh
- Written by: Johan Doesburg
- Produced by: Theo Van Gogh
- Cinematography: Tom Erisman
- Music by: Ruud Bos
- Distributed by: Shooting Star Film Distribution; Dino film production
- Release date: 1 September 1994
- Running time: 87 minutes
- Country: Netherlands
- Language: Dutch
- Budget: fl 250.000

1-900 or 06 is a 1994 Dutch erotic romantic drama film directed by Theo Van Gogh. The screenplay was based on a stage play of the same name by Johan Doesburg. The film depicts a relationship based on telephone sex which gets out of hand. The film was selected as the Dutch entry for the Best Foreign Language Film at the 67th Academy Awards, but was not accepted as a nominee.

== Plot ==
Sara Wevers, a woman in her thirties, places a 06-advertisement (a type of sex hotline popular in the early 1990s where people would leave their phone numbers, after which others could call them back anonymously), to which architect Wilbert Venema (under the alias Thomas) responds. A relationship based around weekly phone calls then blossoms. Sara is the one in control, as she is the one with the phone number.

Wilbert can only wait, but suddenly he strikes back. By chance, he discovers his phone lover's name, Sara Wevers, as well as her address, at a party. He is rewarded with coldness, he has broken the code and the relationship is over. There will be no more phone calls. Then the finale begins, grim and deadly

== Cast ==
- Ariane Schluter ... Sarah Wevers
- Ad van Kempen ... Thomas Venema

== Production ==
The film was shot in just 5 days by Van Gogh. Just like in the stage play, the actors heavily improvised during the production.

== See also ==
- List of submissions to the 67th Academy Awards for Best Foreign Language Film
- List of Dutch submissions for the Academy Award for Best Foreign Language Film
