= The Hessen Affair =

2009 film

- Theatrical release poster
- Directed by: Paul Breuls
- Screenplay by: Nicholas Meyer; Ronald Roose
- Produced by: Paul Breuls; Catherine Vandeleene
- Starring: Billy Zane; Lyne Renee; Michael Bowen; Noah Segan
- Cinematography: Kees Van Oostrum
- Edited by: Les Healey
- Music by: Stephen Warbeck
- Production company: Corsan
- Distributed by: Anchor Bay Entertainment; Cinematic Vision; Eagle Films
- Release date: January 14, 2009 (Belgium)
- Running time: 113 min
- Country: Belgium
- Language: English
- Budget: $20,000,000

The Hessen Affair is a 2009 Belgian film noir-style thriller movie, partly filmed in Manitoba, Canada, scripted by Nicholas Meyer and directed by Paul Breuls and starring Billy Zane, Lyne Renee, Noah Segan, and Michael Bowen. The movie was released on DVD as The Hessen Conspiracy. The film is based on the theft of the crown jewels of the Hessen-Kassel family in 1945.

== Plot ==
Immediately after World War II, two American officers (played by Bill Zane and Lyne Renee) are stationed in Frankfurt, Germany, killing time in the fancy Kronberg Castle. They discover there a cache of priceless jewels, formerly owned by Sophie, Princess Christoph of Hesse and the former German Imperial royal family. But when the two lovers try to smuggle the treasure back in the US and sell it, their plans become quickly complicated by military investigators and violent criminals. Now, if they are able to remain faithful to each other, they may become incredibly rich.

== Cast ==
- Billy Zane as Jack Durant
- Lyne Renée as Lt. Kathleen Nash
- Michael Bowen as Ben Cassidy
- Noah Segan as Lt. David Pallard
- Rudolph Segers as Sgt. Roy Tarlton
- Mireille Leveque as Sophie, Princess Christoph of Hesse

== See also ==
- List of Belgian films of the 2000s
