= Waiter (film) =

- Theatrical release poster
- Directed by: Alex van Warmerdam
- Written by: Alex van Warmerdam
- Produced by: Marc van Warmerdam
- Starring: Alex van Warmerdam; Ariane Schluter; Mark Rietman; Thekla Reuten; Line Van Wambeke
- Cinematography: Tom Erisman
- Edited by: Ewin Ryckaert
- Music by: Vincent van Warmerdam
- Production companies: Graniet Film; VARA
- Distributed by: A-Film Distribution
- Release dates: 10 September 2006 (Toronto Film Festival); 27 September 2006 (Netherlands Film Festival); 28 September 2006 (Netherlands)
- Running time: 97 minutes
- Countries: Netherlands; Belgium
- Languages: Dutch; English

Waiter (Dutch: Ober) is a 2006 Dutch-Belgian absurdist black comedy film by Alex van Warmerdam. It tells the story of Edgar, a discontented waiter. The film had its world premiere on the Toronto Film Festival on 10 September 2006. It was the opening film of the Netherlands Film Festival, where Waiter received two Golden Calves, for Best Scenario and Best Production Design. In January 2007 the film received a Golden Film. The film is about stagnation of creativity and a take on overbearing of elements in life, it also takes wryly a puck-shot at god and his relation with humans.

== Plot ==
Waiter tells the story of Edgar (Alex van Warmerdam), a waiter with a flair for the unfortunate. His sick wife, Ilse (Sylvia Poorta), is overly rude to him. Customers at work constantly bully him and his neighbors make his life impossible. Fed up with the way his life is going, Edgar goes to the house of Herman (Mark Rietman), the scriptwriter who invented Edgar and is currently writing his story. Edgar complains about the events in his life that keep getting worse and begs for some positive events in his life, including a decent girlfriend. Herman decides to create Stella (Line Van Wambeke), but soon Edgar realizes that Stella will only complicate his life more. Meanwhile, Edgar is pestered by his pushy girlfriend Victoria (Ariane Schluter), who constantly tries to be with him. Driven to insanity by Herman and his obnoxious girlfriend Suzie (Thekla Reuten), Edgar constantly tries to interfere with his story. Herman decides to make the story more extreme and violent and finally ends the story out of desperation with Edgar's death.

== Cast ==
- Alex van Warmerdam as Edgar
- Ariane Schluter as Victoria
- Jakop Ahlbom as Stanley
- Mark Rietman as Herman
- Thekla Reuten as Suzie
- Line Van Wambeke as Stella

== Awards ==
- Golden Calf for Best Script (2006)
- Golden Calf for Best Production Design (2006)
- Golden Film (2007)
