= Schneider vs. Bax =

- Theatrical release poster
- Directed by: Alex van Warmerdam
- Written by: Alex van Warmerdam
- Produced by: Marc van Warmerdam
- Cinematography: Tom Erisman
- Edited by: Job ter Burg
- Music by: Alex van Warmerdam
- Production company: Graniet Film
- Distributed by: Cinéart
- Release date: 28 May 2015
- Running time: 94 minutes
- Countries: Netherlands; Belgium
- Language: Dutch

Schneider vs. Bax is a 2015 comedy thriller film directed by Alex van Warmerdam, starring Tom Dewispelaere and Warmerdam. It tells the story of a contract killer who has one day to assassinate a reclusive writer.

== Plot ==
On his birthday, Schneider is awakened by his wife and two young daughters who bring presents and are planning a birthday dinner celebration for that evening. But Schneider is a contract killer disguised as a handyman and his boss, Mertens, calls with a contract that he says cannot be postponed. Schneider reluctantly takes on the supposedly easy task of killing Bax, a novelist sequestered in a remote lakeside cabin. Mertens insists the job be done today, adding, “Ramon Bax is a child killer.” Bax, who displays significant substance-abuse problems, turns out to be a hitman who also works for Mertens. He has forgotten that he was supposed to kill Schneider that day. Mertens told him: “Schneider is a child killer.” However, Bax is not alone and soon has to deal with his younger lover, Nadine, when he remembers that Francisca, his depressed adult daughter, is about to arrive for a visit. Soon, his lecherous father, Gerard, also shows up with a young girlfriend.

Both Schneider and Bax eventually realize they are being played, but by the time they do, there are too many complications to allow them to back out easily. Schneider uses an escort whom he has saved from a pimp to do cover work for him. Francisca, who arrived depressed and frustrated that no one in her life seems to help her, runs from her father and finds an abandoned shack inside the wildlife sanctuary that surrounds the cabin. She kills Gerard, her grandfather, when he starts to molest her after being sent into the swamp to bring her back. Francisca discovers that her father is a hitman, not just a novelist, and she tries to help him finish Schneider. Meanwhile, Schneider kidnaps Mertens and props him as a target for Bax. Bax mistakenly kills Mertens, as intended. Bax prepares to leave the house since his boss is dead and the contract is off; he considers this to apply, in principle, for his rival colleague, Schneider, as well. But Schneider sees Bax as an adversary who has seen too much and kills him. Meanwhile, Francisca has discovered renewed inner strength and picked up her father's sniper rifle to try to eliminate the threat from Schneider. He and Francisca hunt each other. He wants to kill her as the last witness to his crimes. He manages to disarm her from outside the abandoned shack where she killed her grandfather, but when he enters for the final kill, Francisca appears naked and seated before Schneider. Schneider hesitates, then leaves her and rejoins his family for his birthday celebration.

== Cast ==
- Tom Dewispelaere as Schneider
- Alex van Warmerdam as Ramon Bax
- Maria Kraakman as Francisca
- Annet Malherbe as Gina
- Gene Bervoets as Mertens
- Eva van de Wijdeven as Nadine
- Pierre Bokma as Bolek
- Henri Garcin as Gerard
- Loes Haverkort as Lucy

== Production ==
The film was co-produced through Graniet Film and Belgium's Czar TV in collaboration with the broadcast association VARA. It received 650,000 euro from the Nederlands Filmfonds, 200,000 euro from the Vlaams Audiovisueel Fonds and 470,000 euro from Eurimages. Filming began in July 2014 and took two months.

== Release ==
The film was released in the Netherlands on 28 May 2015. It was screened in the Contemporary World Cinema section of the 2015 Toronto International Film Festival.
