= Cinéart =

Belgian film distributor

- Founded: 1975; 51 years ago
- Founder: Eliane Dubois
- Headquarters: Brussels
- Owner: Mubi (majority)
- Website: www.cineart.be

Cinéart is a Belgian arthouse film distributor founded in 1975 by Eliane Dubois which operates throughout the Benelux and has main offices in Amsterdam and Brussels.

The distributor has previously been responsible for films such as The Zone of Interest, The Whale, and The Substance.

== History ==
In 2003, Cinéart, A-Film, Frenetic Films, Haut Et Court and Lucky Red/EyeScreen created a jointly-owned film acquisition firm named Indie Circle.

In 2008, Cinéart started distributing films in the Netherlands. On 20 August 2014, founder Eliane Dubois died aged 65. In February 2024, streaming service Mubi acquired a majority stake in the company.

== Filmography ==
=== Dutch-language films ===
Release date	Title	Notes
22 May 2010	22nd of May	Belgian film;
1 March 2012	170 Hz	Dutch film;
16 January 2013	Kid	Belgian film;
7 February 2013	Matterhorn	Dutch film;
29 August 2013	Borgman	Dutch film;
28 May 2014	Schneider vs. Bax	Dutch film;
24 March 2016	History's Future	Dutch film;
3 November 2016	A Real Vermeer	Dutch film;
30 September 2021	Nr. 10	Dutch film;

=== Non-Dutch-language films (Note: Release dates listed here are Dutch release dates.) ===
==== 2008 ====
- Quiet Chaos (28-08-08)
- Conversations with My Gardener (03-07-08)
- The Class (27-11-08)
- Funny Games U.S. (29-05-08)
- The Secret of the Grain (17-04-08)
- Julia (14-08-08)
- Lemon Tree (31-07-08)
- Paris (15-05-08)
- Lorna's Silence (16-10-08)
- Vicky Cristina Barcelona (11-12-08)
- Waltz with Bashir (06-11-08)
- Where in the World Is Osama bin Laden? (11-09-08)

==== 2009 ====
- 24 City (03-09-09)
- 35 Shots of Rum (16-07-09)
- The Army of Crime (12-11-09)
- The Chaser (10-09-09)
- The Escapist (23-07-09)
- Fish Tank (22-10-09)
- The Hedgehog (05-11-09)
- Linha de Passe (14-05-09)
- Looking for Eric (17-09-09)
- Micmacs (17-12-09)
- The Beaches of Agnès (18-06-09)
- The First Day of the Rest of Your Life (26-02-09)
- Ricky (23-04-09)
- Séraphine (12-11-09)
- Slumdog Millionaire (12-02-09)
- Unmade Beds (13-08-09)
- Unspoken (11-06-09)
- Welcome (30-07-09)

==== 2010 ====
- Ajami (27-05-10)
- Babies (07-10-10)
- The Barons (06-05-10)
- Benda Bilili! (19-08-10)
- Le Concert (14-01-10)
- Copacabana (25-11-10)
- Desert Flower (08-04-10)
- Eyes Wide Open (04-03-10)
- Gainsbourg: A Heroic Life (18-04-10)
- The Last Exorcism (04-11-10)
- Mother and Child (11-11-10)
- No One Knows About Persian Cats (01-04-10)
- The Front Line (10-06-10)
- Samson and Delilah (22-04-10)
- A Single Man (04-02-10)
- Tamara Drewe (28-10-10)
- The Time That Remains (06-05-10)
- The Tree (07-10-10)

==== 2011 ====
- 13 Assassins (23-06-11)
- The Artist (24-11-11)
- The Last Circus (28-04-11)
- Cirkus Columbia (07-07-11)
- The Rabbi's Cat (29-09-11)
- In Your Hands (21-04-11)
- Drive (03-11-11)
- Essential Killing (08-09-11)
- Declaration of War (22-09-11)
- We Have a Pope (13-10-11)
- In a Better World (07-04-11)
- Incendies (10-02-11)
- Made in Dagenham (12-05-11)
- Little White Lies (13-01-11)
- Pina (07-07-11)
- The First Beautiful Thing (25-08-11)
- A Separation (11-08-11)
- Silent Souls (24-02-11)

==== 2012 ====
- One Night (28-06-12)
- Amour (15-12-12)
- The Angels' Share (06-09-12)
- Asterix and Obelix: God Save Britannia (18-10-12)
- Café de Flore (03-05-12)
- A Dangerous Method (15-03-12)
- Ernest & Celestine (13-12-12)
- The Other Son (13-12-12)
- Haute Cuisine (25-10-12)
- Love Is All You Need (27-09-12)
- The Snows of Kilimanjaro (26-07-12)
- Polisse (05-01-12)
- Populaire (29-11-12)
- Chicken with Plums (19-04-12)
- Renoir (20-12-12)
- Sleep Tight (19-07-12)
- The Source (14-06-12)
- Wuthering Heights (12-04-12)

==== 2013 ====
- &Me (14-03-13)
- Amazonia (19-12-13)
- Bekas (11-07-13)
- Byzantium (11-07-13)
- Horses of God (02-05-13)
- Diana (14-11-13)
- Mood Indigo (23-05-13)
- Foxfire: Confessions of a Girl Gang (27-06-13)
- Gabrielle (31-10-13)
- The Grandmaster (09-05-13)
- Inch'Allah (28-03-13)
- Young & Beautiful (19-09-13)
- Kill List (31-01-13)
- Kirikou and the Men and Women (24-01-13)
- Only God Forgives (13-06-13)
- The Patience Stone (21-02-13)
- Sightseers (31-01-13)
- The Spirit of '45 (05-12-13)

==== 2014 ====
- Three Hearts (06-11-14)
- Blind (23-10-14)
- Chinese Puzzle (08-05-14)
- The Congress (09-01-14)
- Two Days, One Night (19-06-14)
- Eastern Boys (03-07-14)
- Jimmy's Hall (14-08-14)
- Joe (12-06-14)
- Nicholas on Holiday (31-07-14)
- Maps to the Stars (28-08-14)
- Minuscule: Valley of the Lost Ants (24-04-14)
- Nebraska (27-02-14)
- The Salt of the Earth (4-12-14)
- The Selfish Giant (30-01-14)
- Still the Water (20-11-14)
- Watermark (11-09-14)
- Wild Tales (30-10-14)
- Winter Sleep (25-09-14)

==== 2015 ====
- Amy (13-08-15)
- Big Eyes (05-02-15)
- The Club (26-11-15)
- Difret (21-05-15)
- The Farewell Party (23-07-15)
- Girlhood (29-01-15)
- Once in a Lifetime (09-04-15)
- Do Not Disturb (15-01-15)
- Marshland (09-07-15)
- Jimi: All Is by My Side (23-04-15)
- Diary of a Chambermaid (25-06-15)
- Lost River (30-04-15)
- Love (27-08-15)
- Macondo (18-06-15)
- Melody (14-05-15)
- Mia Madre (03-09-15)
- Mon Roi (03-12-15)
- Mustang (01-10-15)
- Return to Ithaca (19-03-15)
- Son of Saul (05-11-15)
- Testament of Youth (05-11-15)
- Timbuktu (26-03-15)

==== 2016 ====
- Bang Gang (A Modern Love Story) (17-03-16)
- Black (14-01-16)
- Captain Fantastic (01-09-16)
- The Unknown Girl (20-10-16)
- A Kid (29-09-16)
- Fire at Sea (06-10-16)
- Up for Love (12-05-16)
- I, Daniel Blake (24-11-16)
- Julieta (18-08-16)
- Keeper (07-04-16)
- Love & Friendship (26-05-16)
- Slack Bay (23-06-16)
- Ma Ma (15-09-16)
- My Life as a Courgette (13-10-16)
- Prejudice (03-03-16)
- The Salesman (08-12-16)
- The People vs. Fritz Bauer (28-04-16)
- Tomorrow (21-04-16)
