= The Price of Sugar (2013 film) =

- Film poster
- Dutch: Hoe duur was de suiker
- Directed by: Jean van de Velde
- Starring: Gaite Jansen; Neil Sandilands
- Edited by: Job ter Burg
- Release date: 26 September 2013
- Running time: 120 minutes
- Country: Netherlands
- Languages: Dutch, Surinamese

The Price of Sugar (Dutch: Hoe duur was de suiker) is a 2013 Dutch drama film based on the eponymous novel by Cynthia McLeod.

The film premiered as the opening film of the Netherlands Film Festival on Wednesday 25 September 2013. The Kijkwijzer labelled it as for 16 years and above and also gave the warnings of violence, coarse language and discrimination. The miniseries was shown by VARA in February and March 2014. The first broadcast took place on Saturday 8 February 2014 in the Netherlands. The series uses the same footage as in the film, but the series has over an hour of additional film material.

== Cast ==
- Gaite Jansen as Sarith
- Neil Sandilands as Reinder Almersma
- Yootha Wong-Loi-Sing as Mini-Mini
- Kees Boot as Julius Robles Medina
- Yannick van de Velde as Rutger le Chasseur
- Anna Raadsveld as Elza
