= Gene Bervoets =

Belgian actor

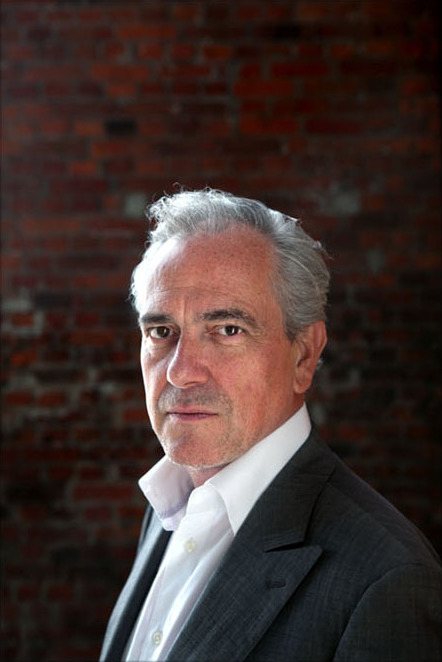

Eugène Joanna Alfons "Gene" Bervoets (born 26 March 1956 in Antwerp) is a Belgian actor. He has performed in more than 60 films since 1979.

== Selected filmography ==
Film
Year	Title	Role	Notes
1987	Crazy Love	Jeff	
1988	The Vanishing	Rex Hofman	
1993	Anchoress	Reeve	
1995	The Flying Dutchman	Zoon van Netelneck	
1999	Shades	Max Vogel	
2003	The Alzheimer Case	Seynaeve	
2006	'N Beetje Verliefd	Guy	
2007	Duska	Bob	
2008	Loft	Burgemeester Van Esbroeck	
2009	The Last Days of Emma Blank	Haneveld	
2013	Salamander	Guy Rasenberg	
2014	Le Dernier Diamant	Philippe de Mazières	
2015	Michiel de Ruyter	Van Ginneken	
2015	Schneider vs. Bax	Mertens	
2015	Home Suite Home (film)	Ludwig	
2018	Redbad		
2018	Gangsta		
2023	Inside		
2023	Knokke Off	Jacques	
2026	Dag & Nacht		
