= Loonies =

2002 film

Loenatik - De moevie (Loonies - The movie)
- Directed by: Bobby Eerhart
- Written by: Karin van Holst Pellekaan, Martin van Waardenberg
- Produced by: Errol Nayci, Volkert Struycken
- Starring: Karin van Holst Pellekaan, Martin van Waardenberg, Dick van den Toorn
- Cinematography: Jules van den Steenhoven
- Edited by: Job ter Burg
- Distributed by: Three Lines Pictures
- Release date: 10 October 2002
- Running time: 90 minutes
- Country: Netherlands
- Language: Dutch

Loonies (Dutch: Loenatik - De moevie) is a 2002 Dutch family film, based on a Dutch TV series Loonies (Dutch Loenatik).

The film received a Golden Film (75,000 visitors) in 2002.
