= Alex van Warmerdam =

Dutch film director, screenwriter, actor and painter

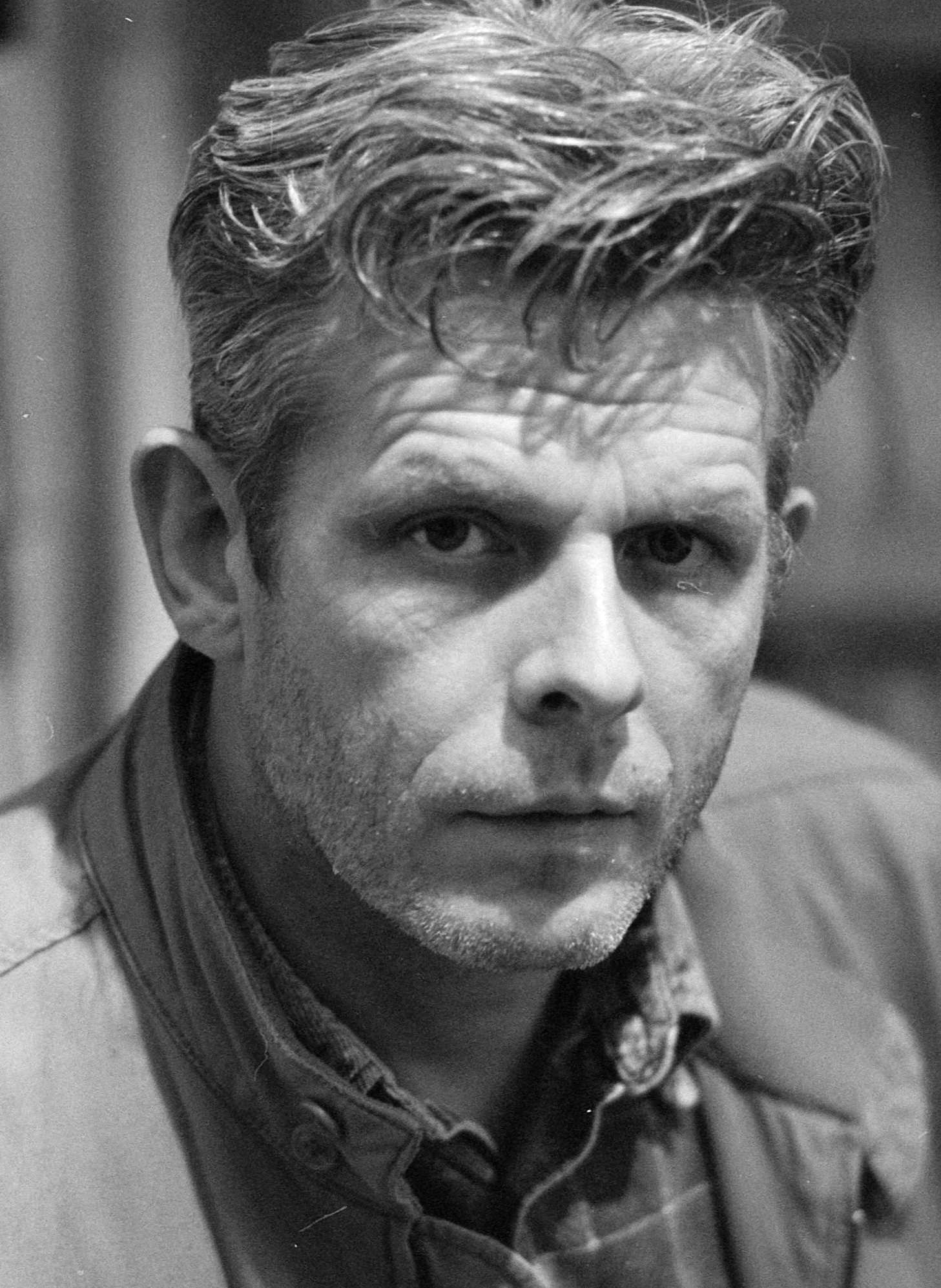
- Alex van Warmerdam in 1996
- Born: 14 August 1952 (age 73); Haarlem, Netherlands
- Occupations: Writer, film director, actor
- Spouse: Annet Malherbe
- Children: Mees, Houk

Alex van Warmerdam (born 14 August 1952) is a Dutch screenwriter, film director, and actor. He is also a painter.

== Life and career ==
Van Warmerdam was born in Haarlem, a city in the province of North Holland in the Netherlands. He was cofounder of the theatre group Hauser Orkater (which later became the musictheatre group Orkater). In 1980, he founded the theatre group De Mexicaanse Hond (The Mexican Dog), together with his brother Marc van Warmerdam. This is the name under which all the shows since 1989 have been released.

He made his first feature film in 1986: Abel. He plays a role in each of his films so far, with the exception of Grimm (2003).

Alex van Warmerdam is married to Dutch actress Annet Malherbe, who plays parts in most of his films and also functions as a casting director. Their son Mees is a musician and has performed in various shows by theatre group De Mexicaanse Hond.

He won the Nederlands-Vlaamse Toneelschrijfprijs in 1990 and the Taalunie Toneelschrijfprijs in 2011.

His 2013 film Borgman was nominated for the Palme d'Or at the 2013 Cannes Film Festival.

== Filmography ==
=== Short films and TV films ===
- Adelbert (1977) (short film) (as an actor)
- Entree Brussels (1978) (short film) (as a writer)
- Striptease (1979) (short film) (as a writer)
- Zie De Mannen Vallen (1980) (TV film)
- Graniet (1982) (TV film)
- De Stedeling (1984) (short film)

=== Feature films ===
Date	Title	Writer	Director	Actor	Music
1986	Abel a.k.a. Voyeur	☒	☒	☒	
1992	The Northerners	☒	☒	☒	
1996	The Dress	☒	☒	☒	☒
1998	Little Tony	☒	☒	☒	☒
2003	Grimm	☒	☒		☒
2006	Waiter	☒	☒	☒	
2009	The Last Days of Emma Blank	☒	☒	☒	☒
2012	Black Out			☒	
2013	Borgman	☒	☒	☒	
2015	Schneider vs. Bax	☒	☒	☒	☒
2021	Nr. 10	☒	☒		☒
