= Hector and the Search for Happiness =

2002 novel by François Lelord

First edition (French) (publisher Odile Jacob)

Hector and the Search for Happiness (French: Le Voyage d'Hector ou la Recherche du bonheur) is a novel by French writer François Lelord written in 2002 and translated into English in 2010. It has sold over two million copies.

An English language film adaptation, directed by Peter Chelsom, and co-written by Chelsom with Tinker Lindsay and Maria von Heland, with Simon Pegg and Rosamund Pike starring, was released on 15 August 2014.

== Reception ==
Emma Hagestadt in The Independent wrote "Served up as a series of philosophical bonne bouches, Hector's lessons for life may verge on the banale -- make sure to be good to your friends, be loved for who you are, take holidays in the sun -- but their effect is unexpectedly cheering."
