= The Mostly True Adventures of Homer P. Figg =

Book by Rodman Philbrick

- First edition (publ. Blue Sky Press)
- Author: Rodman Philbrick
- Language: English
- Publication date: 2009

The Mostly True Adventures of Homer P. Figg is a historical novel by Rodman Philbrick, author of Freak the Mighty. Set during the American Civil War, it follows the adventures of a boy who is an inveterate teller of tall tales on his quest to find his older brother, a Union soldier. First published in 2009, it was named as a Newbery Honor Book in 2010. The Lexile Level of this book is 950L and the Accelerated Reader (AR) Level is 5.6. This book contains 192 pages.

== Plot summary ==
This story is narrated by the story's main character, Homer P. Figg, an orphan in Maine living with his older brother, Harold P. Figg, under the cruel treatment of their mother's sister's husband, Squinton Leach. After Harold beats up Leach for abusing them once again, Leach and some other men draft Harold into the Union army illegally. Homer is thrown into a root cellar and subsequently escapes by digging a tunnel. He tries to escape on a horse at night, but is intercepted by two men named Stink and Smelt.

The duo force him to investigate a suspected underground railroad operator named Jebediah Brewster, a Quaker who owns a gemstone mine. Homer visits Brewster and is treated well by him, as he understands the situation Homer is in. Brewster advises him to tell the truth, but Homer lies instead. As a result, he is nearly killed but is saved by a fellow prisoner named Samuel Reed, whose life Homer had saved earlier.

Homer and Reed return to the Brewsters, and Reed leads the fugitive slaves back on their way to freedom. Mr. Brewster then assigns Homer to a young Methodist clergyman, Reverend Webster B. Willow, to act as his guardian. Unfortunately when they board a ship to find Homer's brother, Willow is seduced by a woman and scammed out of his money. Willow asks the steward to throw Homer into the cargo deck with the pigs.

Once the ship docks, Homer is tormented by the crowd as a “pig-boy” until a man named Professor Fleabottom rescues him. He invites Homer to join his medicine show as the amazing “Pig-Boy”. One night, Homer accidentally sees Fleabottom handing a leather satchel to a man on a black horse. They are running away from a colonel who sent a squad after them, who Fleabottom tried to bribe with silver coins. They continue running and come across a rogue balloon with a man inside yelling for help. Homer and another member of the show help, but are nearly killed when a group of Union soldiers and a captain come to arrest them for treason. During the encounter, Homer discovers Fleabottom is actually a Rebel spy by the name of Reginald Robertson Crockett.

Homer escapes in a balloon, avoiding arrest, but crash lands into Confederate territory and is thrown into custody. Homer escapes on the back of a stolen pony, riding right through the battle of Gettysburg, and makes it to Union territory. He meets Reverend Webster B. Willow, who saw Homer's brother and informs Homer that Harold isn't in the fighting yet and will presumably arrive tomorrow in the Maine regiment.

When Homer intercepts the Maine regiment he discovers that Harold was sent to the rear as a mutineer for slamming his officer into the mud, just like what he did to Leach. The general in charge, Colonel Joshua Lawrence Chamberlain, sends all men available, including the prisoners, to reinforce the hill they are guarding. Harold leaves to fight despite Homer pleading with him not to go. Homer is right in the fighting as a “support unit”, but injures Harold's leg accidentally.

Both Homer and Harold live, although Harold loses his leg due to an infection. They spend the two years working on farms and in small factories. Mr. Brewster finds them, is made their legal guardian, and names them his kin and heirs.

== Stage version ==
A stage version debuted at the Kennedy Center in 2012.
