= Don Calfa =

American actor

- Calfa in Weekend at Bernie's (1989)
- Born: Donald George Calfa; December 3, 1939; Brooklyn, New York, U.S.
- Died: December 1, 2016 (aged 76); Yucca Valley, California, U.S.
- Occupation: Actor
- Years active: 1968–2015
- Spouse: Trixie Flynn (1977-1981) (divorced)

Donald George Calfa (December 3, 1939 – December 1, 2016) was an American film and television character actor whose credits spanned over 40 years, playing both comedic and dramatic roles. Although Calfa appeared in many high-profile films and television series, he was perhaps best known for his turns (in a rare leading role) as mortician Ernie Kaltenbrunner in the 1985 cult zombie horror-comedy The Return of the Living Dead, and the bumbling hitman Paulie in the 1989 slapstick comedy hit Weekend at Bernie's.

== Early life and education ==
Calfa was born on December 3, 1939, in Brooklyn, New York, and was raised in Ozone Park, Queens and later West Hempstead, Long Island. According to his official biography, Calfa was originally interested in pursuing a career in the fine arts, but diverted his interest to acting after seeing Rebel Without a Cause. He promptly dropped out of high school to join a theater workshop (later finishing his degree through night school), eventually joining both the Actors' Equity Association and the Screen Actors Guild.

== Career ==
Before transitioning to film, Calfa worked heavily in theater, appearing in many Off-Off-Broadway productions and having performed on Broadway in 1965 in Mating Dance and in 1971 in Lenny.

Calfa worked steadily in both film and television for over 40 years, and worked alongside such high-profile actors and directors as Warren Beatty, Michael Douglas, Jack Nicholson, Martin Scorsese and Steven Spielberg. Although he worked extensively as a dramatic actor, Calfa is perhaps best recognized for his comedic performances in various cult films, including as Paulie in Weekend at Bernie's, Scarface in Foul Play, Harold Grand in Treasure of the Moon Goddess and mad scientist Ralph Willum in Chopper Chicks in Zombietown.

Calfa was perhaps best known for his major role in the 1985 cult horror-comedy The Return of the Living Dead, in which he played the eccentric, gun-toting, and bleached-blonde mortician Ernie Kaltenbrunner. He would later audition for the role of Doc Mandel in the 1988 sequel Return of the Living Dead Part II, which also featured several returning stars from the original, but the part ultimately went to Philip Bruns. In 1993, Calfa was set to play the character Colonel Peck in Return of the Living Dead III, but had to pull out of production for personal reasons. He remained good friends with the rest of the Living Dead cast and crew, and made appearances alongside them at horror conventions and screenings of the film across the United States. Calfa was also interviewed for the 2012 documentary on the film, More Brains! A Return to the Living Dead.

Calfa appeared in many other popular American television series, including Kojak (2 episodes), Baretta, The Streets of San Francisco (3 episodes), The Bionic Woman, Benson, Night Court, Simon & Simon, Hill Street Blues (2 episodes), Matlock, Twin Peaks, Doogie Howser, M.D. (3 episodes), Murder She Wrote (2 episodes), and Beverly Hills 90210 (3 episodes). He played 7 different characters on 7 episodes of Barney Miller.

== Personal life and death ==
Calfa was a member of the Academy of Motion Picture Arts and Sciences. He had been a close friend and colleague of fellow actor Richard Lynch since the 1960s, and acted alongside him in H.P. Lovecraft's: Necronomicon (1993), Toughguy (1995), Corpses Are Forever (2003) and Lewisburg (2010). He was married to Trixie Flynn (from September 10, 1977 – August 26, 1981); the union ended in divorce.

Calfa died on December 1, 2016, at his home in Yucca Valley, California, two days before his 77th birthday.

== Filmography ==
=== Film roles ===
Film
Year	Title	Role	Notes
1968	No More Excuses	Priest	Directed by Robert Downey Sr.
1969	Utterly Without Redeeming Social Value	Peter DeCola	
1970	Pound	Italian Terrier	Directed by Robert Downey Sr.
1972	Greaser's Palace	Morris	Directed by Robert Downey Sr.
1973	The Rainbow Boys	Mazella	
1973	Cinderella Liberty	Lewis	Directed by Mark Rydell
1974	Rhinoceros	Waiter	
1974	Bank Shot	Stosh Gornik	
1974	Shanks	Albert Einstein	Directed by William Castle
1975	Peeper	Rosie	
1976	Nickelodeon	Waldo	Directed by Peter Bogdanovich
1977	New York, New York	Gilbert	Directed by Martin Scorsese
1978	Foul Play	Scarface	
1979	10	Neighbor	Directed by Blake Edwards
1979	The Rose	Don Frank	
1979	1941	Telephone operator	Directed by Steven Spielberg
1981	The Postman Always Rings Twice	Goebel	
1983	The Star Chamber	Lawrence Monk	
1983	Over Here, Mr. President	Wardell Slaughter	
1983	The Man Who Wasn't There	Tohfa	
1984	E. Nick: A Legend in His Own Mind	E. 'Nick' Vanacuzzi	Starring role
1985	The Return of the Living Dead	Ernie Kaltenbrunner	Major role
1986	Running Scared	Women's Room Lawyer	
1987	Talking Walls	Andre	
1987	Treasure of the Moon Goddess	Harold Grand	Major role
1988	The Presidio	Howard Buckely	
1988	Blue Movies	Max	
1989	Weekend at Bernie's	Paulie	Major role
1989	Chopper Chicks in Zombietown	Ralph Willum	Major role
1991	Bugsy	Louie Dragna	Directed by Barry Levinson
1992	Me Myself & I	Irving	Major role
1992	Stay Tuned	Wetzel	
1993	H.P. Lovecraft's: Necronomicon	Mr. Benedict	(part 3)
1995	Mr. Payback: An Interactive Movie	City Hall Guard	Video Game
1995	Toughguy	Office Worker #1	
1995	Cobs n Roberts	Lance	
1998	Progeny	Jimmy Stevens	
1998	Dr. Dolittle	Patient at Hammersmith	
2001	Downward Angel	Adam	
2002	The 4th Tenor	Bum #3	
2003	Night Creep	Mr. Blunt	
2003	Corpses Are Forever	Jack Stark	Credited as Lance Fladoda
2010	Lewisburg	Night Clerk	
2011	More Brains! A Return to the Living Dead	Himself	Documentary film
2012	Pablo	Himself	
2015	Sharkskin	Joey 'Snot'	

=== Television roles ===
Television
Year	Show	Role	Notes
1972	Goodnight, My Love	Bananas	Made for TV movie
1972	The Delphi Bureau	Gunjamen	Episode: "The White Plague Project"
1973	The Blue Knight		Made for TV movie
1974–1975	Kojak	Fidelio Ortez; Burgess	Episode: "Marker to a Dead Bookie"; Episode: "A House of Prayer, a Den of Thieves"
1974–1977	The Streets of San Francisco	Larry Mason; Sparrow; Randolf J. "Moonshine" Fisher	Episode: "Mister Nobody"; Episode: "Poisoned Snow"; Episode: "A Good Cop...But"
1976	Most Wanted		Episode: "Pilot"
1976	Baretta	Corsican	Episode: "Aggie"
1976	Delvecchio	Sergeant Mendez; Narc	Episode: "Contract for Harry"; Episode: "The Avenger"
1977–1981	Barney Miller	Mr. DiLucca; Angelo Dodi; Leon Bidell; Calvin J. Kendall; Gilbert Lesco; Arthur Thompson; Eddie	Episode: "Group Home"; Episode: "Copy Cat"; Episode: "Hostage"; Episode: "Identity"; Episode: "The Desk"; Episode: "The Vests"; Episode: "Homeless"
1977	Quinn Martin's Tales of the Unexpected		Episode: "The Final Chapter"
1978	The Bionic Woman	Petie "The Weasel" Regan	Episode: "Rancho Outcast"
1978	The Comedy Company	Harry Fenner	Made for TV movie
1978	Steel Cowboy	"Go" Trucker	Made for TV movie
1979	The Runaways	Sam	Episode: "Dreams of My Father"
1980	Nobody's Perfect	Rosen	Episode: "What's on Third?"
1981	Park Place	Howie Beech	Recurring role (4 episodes)
1981	Benson	Dr. Death	Episode: "The Grass Ain't Greener"
1982	The Day the Bubble Burst	Mr. Cinelli	Made for TV movie
1983	Allison Sydney Harrison	Pat Rosetti	Made for TV movie
1983	Shooting Stars	Driscoll	Made for TV movie
1984	Legmen	Oscar Armismendi	Episode: "Poseidon Indenture"
1984	Hill Street Blues	Oscar Foreman	Episode: "Eva's Brawn"
1984	Night Court	Miles Seaver	Episode: "Billie and the Cat"
1985	Simon & Simon	Randall Deeds	Episode: "Slither"
1985	Our Family Honor	Maltz	Episode: "Runaway Movie Queen"
1985	Amazing Stories	Messenger	Episode: "The Amazing Falsworth"
1986	Blacke's Magic	Officer O'Malley	Episode: "Wax Poetic"
1986	Throb	Coyote Man	Episode: "My Fair Punker Lady"
1987	Private Eye		Made for TV movie
1987	The Law & Harry McGraw	Lou Sandry	Episode: "State of the Art"
1987	9 to 5	Janipopolous	Episode: "Love and Death"
1988, 1993	Murder, She Wrote	Clifford Coleson; Vinnie	Episode: "Mr. Penroy's Vacation"; Episode: "The Survivor"
1988	Houston Knights		Episode: "Bad Paper"
1989	Mancuso, F.B.I.		Episode: "Murder of Pearl"
1990	Matlock	Andrew Sloan	Episode: "Nowhere to Turn"
1990	Twin Peaks	Vice Principal Greege	Episode: "Episode 10 (uncredited) and Episode 17"
1990–1993	Doogie Howser, M.D.	Carmine Delpino	Recurring role (3 episodes)
1990, 1995	Columbo	Rudy	Episode: "Strange Bedfellows"; Episode: "Rest in Peace, Mrs. Columbo"
1993–1994	Beverly Hills, 90210	Mr. Pitts	Recurring role (3 episodes)
1994	Boy Meets World	Frank	Episode: "Who's Afraid of Cory Wolf?"
2003	Less Than Perfect	Uncle Nicky	Episode: "Save the Squirrel, But Bet the Over/Under"
