= Latinos Beyond Reel =

Latinos Beyond Reel is a documentary released on February 23, 2013 and directed by Miguel Picker and Chyng-Feng Sun. It was produced and distributed by the Media Education Foundation. The film talks about the underrepresentation and marginalization of Latinos in U.S media, ranging from off-screen roles to animated characters, and the effect this has on Latino youth.

== Summary ==
The film digs deep into media in American society from the perspective of Latinos, particularly their frequent portrayal of marginalized roles like maids, over-sexualized women, thieves and other antagonists. One actress featured in the film, Lupe Ontiveros, was quoted in previous articles saying she has played the role of a maid more than 150 times. Actor Yancey Arias also discusses being forced to stick with scripts that maintain stereotypical and antagonistic portrayals of Latinos. Despite his best efforts to give his characters better qualities via his acting, these aspects would often be cut from the final product due to behind the scenes interference wanting to maintain familiar stereotypes.

The documentary also explores recent positive portrayals of Latinos in American media and the impacts they are having on society, including Dora the Explorer, George Lopez, and Ugly Betty. Unfortunately, some modern Latina actresses like Sofia Vergara of Modern Family play their roles very stereotypically. Sofia Vergara in particular is one of the most well-known Hispanic actors of all time but still plays to expected Latina stereotypes. Since so many people view Sofia Vergara as a staple of Latino culture, when she plays to these stereotypes people believe they are true. The documentary pinpoints the fact that Latino roles are marginalized on and off camera.

The repeated saturation of poor Latino representation in childrens' media is also a focus. Children in the film claim that they have never seen a Hispanic superhero and that all the protagonists they see are white. One boy refers to these protagonists as "American" while not personally identifying with them, demonstrating the detachment Latinos and other non-dominant races and demographics feel from society and culture in America.

Latinos Beyond Reel also uses key statistics to demonstrate why Latinos should be more of a target market in American consumerism. Latinos make up a large portion of the population yet make up a small portion of the advertising market. Latino consumption and spending habits are also discussed.

== Interviews ==
People interviewed in the documentary Latinos Beyond Reel include:

- Yancey Arias
- Moctesuma Esparza
- Juan Gonzalez
- Hector Herrera
- Lillian Jimenez
- Dennis E. Leoni
- Josefina López
- Alex Nogales
- Luis Antonio Ramos
- Mari Castañeda

== See also ==
- The Bronze Screen: 100 Years of the Latino Image in Hollywood (film)
