= The Fire Pony =

1996 novel by Rodman Philbrick

- First edition, 1996
- Author: Rodman Philbrick
- Language: English
- Genre: Children's literature
- Publisher: Blue Sky Press
- Publication date: 1996
- Publication place: United States
- Media type: Print
- Pages: 175 pp
- ISBN: 9780590552516
- OCLC: 33667886

The Fire Pony is a children's novel written by Rodman Philbrick, first published in the United States in 1996 by Blue Sky Press. It is titled Fire Pony in the UK, where it was first published in 2005 by Usborne

== Plot summary ==
11-year-old Roy and his big brother, Joe, are on the run from the authorities when they fetch up at the Bar None ranch. Their shared passion for horses soon wins them great respect, and Roy is offered the chance of a lifetime, to break in a wild pony that runs like the desert wind. He is even promised that if he can ride Lady Luck, he can keep her – a dream come true.

But Roy knows that Joe has a dangerous secret... a dark obsession that could explode at any time and send Roy's dream, and their whole world, up in smoke.

== List of characters ==
- Roy: The protagonist and narrator
- Joe-Dilly: Roy's older "brother", who loves horses but has a dark obsession
- Nick Jessup: Owner of Bar None ranch
- Rick Valdez: Jessup's foreman, who looks Mexican but was born on the ranch
- Mr. Molton T. Mullins: A rider that Roy races against, who owns a ranch that borders the Bar None ranch

=== The horses ===
- Lady Luck: A horse that Roy trains and rides in a race
- Showdown: A crazy horse which Joe must train
- Pit Stop: Mr. Jessup's horse
