= The Sunchaser =

1996 film by Michael Cimino

- Theatrical release poster by Dan Chapman
- Directed by: Michael Cimino
- Written by: Charles Leavitt; Michael Cimino (Note: Uncredited writer)
- Produced by: Arnon Milchan; Michael Cimino; Larry Spiegel; Judy Goldstein; Joseph S. Vecchio
- Starring: Woody Harrelson; Jon Seda; Anne Bancroft
- Cinematography: Douglas Milsome
- Edited by: Joe D'Augustine
- Music by: Maurice Jarre
- Production company: Regency Enterprises
- Distributed by: Warner Bros.
- Release dates: May 29, 1996 (Cannes); September 27, 1996 (United States)
- Running time: 122 minutes
- Country: United States
- Language: English
- Budget: $31 million
- Box office: $21,508 (Domestic)

The Sunchaser (marketed simply as Sunchaser in promotional material) is a 1996 road crime drama film directed by Michael Cimino, written by Charles Leavitt and starring Woody Harrelson and Jon Seda. It was director Cimino's last feature-length film.

The film was selected to compete for the Palme d'Or at the 49th Cannes Film Festival.

== Plot ==
Brandon "Blue" Monroe, a 16-year-old half-Navajo gang member from East L.A., is serving time in prison for murdering his abusive stepfather. On an annual medical visit, Blue is told by Dr. Michael Reynolds, a wealthy, materialistic oncologist with a wife Victoria and daughter Calantha, that he is dying of abdominal cancer and has very little time left to live. Convinced that he can heal if he gets to Webster Skyhorse, a medicine man in Arizona he knew when he was 8, Blue kidnaps Michael, holding him at gunpoint, and forces him to drive them to a nearby garage where they switch cars.

Blue seeks to find Dibé Nitsaa (one of the six mountain lakes sacred to the Navajo people), said to heal the wounds of anyone who swims in its waters. Michael, however, bemoans his capture to Blue, seeking help to anyone who he comes across and complaining that he is missing out on a dinner engagement for promotion as head of the oncology department. The two men are instantly at odds with each other, separated by their education, class, race, and two very different world views. Michael believes that modern medicine has all the answers to whatever ails human beings, while Blue believes in Native American spirituality which honors the spirit world, sacred places, and herbal medicine.

En route to Arizona, Michael and Blue have a rough encounter with a group of bikers in a small town, and a chase pursues. Later, Michael is bitten by a rattlesnake but is quickly treated for it by Blue, without medical equipment. Back in Los Angeles, Victoria elicits a police manhunt, and the authorities then attempt to track the two men on their eastward journey. As Michael grows closer to his abductor, he comes to terms with a harbored childhood secret that had haunted him; he was forced to take the life of his older brother Jimmy, who was on his death bed and had asked a young Michael to pull the plug.

As Blue's condition worsens, Michael resorts to illegal means to obtain the needed medicine by breaking into a hospital in Flagstaff. The next morning, the two enter the Navajo reservation, but spot a police cruiser parked ahead of them. To escape, Michael drives off the main road and blends in with a cattle herd, becoming unnoticed in the dust kickup.

Eluding the authorities and finally committed to helping Blue on his quest, Michael manages to whisk Blue up the mountain. Meanwhile, a police helicopter spots their car parked nearby. Reaching the top, Blue is reunited with Skyhorse, who directs him to the lake. Michael and Blue embrace, and the two part ways. As the helicopter spots Michael, Blue runs toward the lake, before mystically disappearing into its waters. Back in L.A., Michael, escorted by the police and wearing handcuffs, is reunited with his family.

== Cast ==
- Woody Harrelson as Michael Reynolds
  - John Christian Graas as Young Michael Reynolds
- Jon Seda as Brandon "Blue" Monroe
- Anne Bancroft as Renata Baumbauer
- Alexandra Tydings as Victoria Reynolds
- Matt Mulhern as Chip Byrnes
- Talisa Soto as Navajo Woman
- Richard Bauer as Dr. Bradford
- Victor Aaron as Webster Skyhorse
- Lawrence Pressman as FBI Agent-in-Charge Collier
- Michael O'Neill as FBI Agent Moreland
- Harry Carey Jr. as Cashier
- Carmen Dell'Orefice as Arabella
- Brooke Ashley as Calantha Reynolds
- Andrea Roth as Head Nurse
- Bob Minor as Deputy Lynch
- Christopher Masterson as Jimmy Reynolds
- Brett Harrelson as Younger Highway Patrol Officer
- Andy Berman as Person in Oncology
- Linda M. Duenas as Hot Mexican Waitress

== Production ==
In 1994, Michael Cimino was approached by Regency Enterprises producer Arnon Milchan to direct The Sunchaser, a script by Charles Leavitt that had been offered previously to Diane Keaton and Mel Gibson. Taking creative liberties with the screenplay, Cimino spent several months researching the gang culture of Los Angeles. In December, it was announced Woody Harrelson would star and the film was called The Sun Chasers.

Parts of the film were shot in Downtown Los Angeles, the Mojave Desert, Arizona, Zion National Park, Utah and Colorado. To give authenticity to the dialogue, Cimino had several Navajo advisors on set at all times, including actor Leon Skyhorse Thomas, who gave input on the scenes between Harrelson and Jon Seda.

Mickey Rourke, a collaborator and friend of Cimino's, believed the director "snapped" sometime during the making of The Sunchaser. "Michael is the sort of person that if you take away his money he short-circuits," Rourke said. "He is a man of honor."

Filming was deliberately done with little publicity to avoid media scrutiny. "We feel we have a big surprise in our pocket," said Milchan. "Woody is a great actor and he and Michael really clicked."

=== Post-production ===
Although Cimino was not granted final cut privilege, the producers did not interfere with the editing. Pablo Ferro, the film's main title designer, recommended Joe D'Augustine after the original editor was fired. D'Augustine recalled his first meeting with Cimino: "It was kind of eerie, freaky. I was led into this dark editing room with black velvet curtains and there was this guy hunched over. They bring me into, like, his chamber, as if he was the Pope. Everyone was speaking in hushed tones. He had something covering his face, a handkerchief. He kept his face covered. And nobody was allowed to take his picture [...] Welcome to Ciminoville."

Eventually, he began to like working with Cimino; "He was a genius. I wanted to be his friend," said D'Augustine. "We're sitting there watching the movie, looking for places to add sound effects. We get to the scene where the kid is on the phone, calling 911, shouting, 'There's a guy here with a gun.' I said, 'Do want to put in their side of the conversation?' Michael says, 'I don't know what they'd say,' and then he picks up the phone and dials 911. He says, 'There's a man here with a gun, a very large one,' and then he hands the phone to the sound guy so he can write down what they say."

Jack Nitzsche was originally slated to compose the music for the film, however, creative differences between him and Cimino led to Nitzsche's replacement by Maurice Jarre. Jarre was chosen on the basis of his scores for David Lean epics such as Lawrence of Arabia and Doctor Zhivago, which Cimino loved. He once said that his favorite part of making a film was watching the recording of the soundtrack over the film:

"Suddenly you see this music come on the screen and you think for the first time: I really made a movie. My God, it looks like a movie up there! And it's like, you feel like you're about 12, and it's the first time it occurs to you that you've done a movie [...] It's sublime. Really sublime moment. The best moment in movies I think."

In the end credits, Cimino dedicates the film "To Hal", referencing fellow director Hal Ashby, who himself refused medical treatment for, and died of, pancreatic cancer. Coincidentally, on his deathbed, Ashby had still believed he could pull through and pondered making a film with similar themes of The Sunchaser, dealing with how he had miraculously cheated death.

== Release ==
The film had its world premiere in France where it was entered into competition at the 1996 Cannes Film Festival for the Palme D'Or. (Note: The Cast and Filmmakers section of The Deer Hunter 2006 DVD incorrectly states that Sunchaser won the 1996 Palme d'Or.) A theatrical release was intended, but the film fared so poorly with test audiences that it went straight to video in the United States.

According to composer Maurice Jarre, the film was blocked from receiving the Special Jury Prize by Francis Ford Coppola, who was head of the jury that year:

"Everybody from the Cannes organization loved the film and they wanted to give it Le Prix du Jury, but Francis Ford Coppola disliked Cimino and so the prize was given to another film."

== Critical reception ==
The film received largely negative reviews. Todd McCarthy of Variety wrote, "Michael Cimino's return to filmmaking after a six-year layoff is a conceptually bold tale marked, in its execution, both by visceral intensity and dramatic sloppiness." Jo-Ann Pittman wrote in Film Directors that The Sunchaser had "a predictable and often laughable script. Not good considering it is a drama. The characters are stereotypical and the story again lacks direction. It attempts to handle too many stories at one time. The New Age mystical healing waters are cliché as is the kidnapper/victim story." Leonard Maltin gave the film one and a half stars: "Misbegotten mess tries to touch all trendy bases, scrambling American Indian mysticism, 'New Age' theories and buddy-movie clichés into the format of a road movie."

Kevin Thomas of Los Angeles Times gave The Sunchaser one of its few positive notices. While noting the predictability of the script, Thomas added, "Yet all that's so familiar in Charles Leavitt's script has been given a fresh, brisk spin by the sheer audacity and force of Cimino's style and by an incisive, wide-ranging performance by Harrelson..."

On review aggregation website Rotten Tomatoes, The Sunchaser has a "rotten" approval rating of 17% based on 6 reviews, with an average rating of 4.8/10.

== See also ==
- Monument Valley
