= REM World =

Speculative fiction novel by Rodman Philbrick

- First edition cover
- Author: Rodman Philbrick
- Publisher: Scholastic
- Publication date: May 1, 2000
- ISBN: 0-439-08362-1

REM World is a fantasy/science fiction novel by American writer Rodman Philbrick about a boy who orders a device that will help him lose weight, and when using it he enters a world where he will not only lose weight, but go on the biggest adventure of his life. The title comes from the 4th stage of sleep (a.k.a. Rapid Eye Movement).

== Plot summary ==
Eleven-year-old Arthur Woodbury is tired of being overweight and being called "Biscuit Butt". He is overweight because his father died, and he is sad, even though he lives with his mom and grandma. So he orders a device advertised in a comic book to help himself lose weight in his sleep.

After reading the first side of the instructions, he falls asleep and enters REM World. Feeling ripped off, he throws the device off. But he soon realizes that he's stuck in REM World because he didn't follow the instructions fully. And after meeting his guide Morf, a small, furry creature that can change form, he realizes that he need to find the device, or else the whole world will be swallowed by an evil darkness.

During his quest, he meets frog people, giants that rip apart continents, cloud people who use their wings to glide, killer birds, and an evil demon; along the way he also does push-ups, rows boats, flies, and rides the giants. After finding the device and learning his life should not end because of a lost loved one and that imagination is important, he comes home and has lost a lot of weight. From now on, he is now called "Courage."

== Reception ==
Kirkus Reviews panned the book as "preachy and predictable," claiming that readers would find it "so obviously freighted with Purpose as to be almost devoid of danger or suspense." The School Library Journal was similarly critical, comparing it unfavorably to Norton Juster's The Phantom Tollbooth. Publishers Weekly was more positive, praising the "vivid personalities" found in the story's REM World.
