= Max the Mighty =

1998 novel by Rodman Philbrick

- Author: Rodman Philbrick
- Genre: Young adult fiction
- Publisher: Scholastic
- Publication date: 1998
- Media type: Print
- Pages: 166
- ISBN: 978-0-590-18892-0
- OCLC: 36705731
- Dewey Decimal: [Fic] 21
- LC Class: PZ7.P52112 Max 1998
- Preceded by: Freak the Mighty

Max the Mighty is a young adult novel by Rodman Philbrick. Published in 1998, it is the sequel to Freak the Mighty.

== Plot ==
Max Kane helps Rachel, nicknamed "Worm" because of her love of reading, run away from her overly religious and abusive stepfather, whom Max nicknames "The Undertaker" because he drives a hearse and wears black clothing. The Undertaker accuses Max of kidnapping Worm, so Max and Worm run away with Dippy Hippie on his bus, the Prairie Schooner.

Along the way, they meet two con artists, Frank and Joanie, who read about Max and Worm and a money reward for finding them. Frank then tries to turn them in, and Max and Worm have to leave the Prairie Schooner. To take them the rest of the way they hop a train with Hobo Joe and arrive in Chivalry, Montana on a different train. They go into a mining tunnel and Max discovers that Worm's birth father had died in the Smith Mine disaster. The Undertaker arrives there with the police and Max and Worm run away in the tunnels. They meet Dip, and Max's grandfather, Grim. The police catch them, and Worm runs back into the tunnel. She thinks about committing suicide to be with her father and away from her stepfather, but Max talks her out of it.

A support beam in the mine falls over, pinning the Undertaker to the ground. This prompts Worm to finally confront the Undertaker about all the abuse he has been doing to her and her mother, revealing the truth to the police. Before anything else can happen, the mine starts to collapse, forcing everybody to run for the exit. However, Max cannot bear to leave the Undertaker behind, even after everything he's done, so he lifts up the beam to free the Undertaker. The Undertaker gets out of the mine in time, but Max couldn't. Fortunately, emergency services manage to rescue Max, who winds up with a broken shoulder and a broken leg as a result.

Afterward, Worm's mother finally works up the courage to stand up to her abusive husband and testify about what really happened, getting the Undertaker convicted of domestic abuse and locked up in prison for a long time. The book ends with Max and his grandparents insisting that Worm and her mother live with them, which they gladly do.

Max frequently mentions his old friend Kevin, also nicknamed Freak, throughout the book.

== Characters ==
- Maxwell Kane is the main protagonist of Max the Mighty. In the preceding book Freak the Mighty, he is described as abnormally large and looking very visually similar to his father (Kenneth "Killer" Kane). Despite his appearance to his father, he has proven numerous times that he is nothing like his father in regards to personality, as he is very sympathetic and understanding of those different from him. He also is dyslexic.
