= Antilla, Cuba =

Town in Holguín Province, southeast Cuba

Antilla
- Municipality
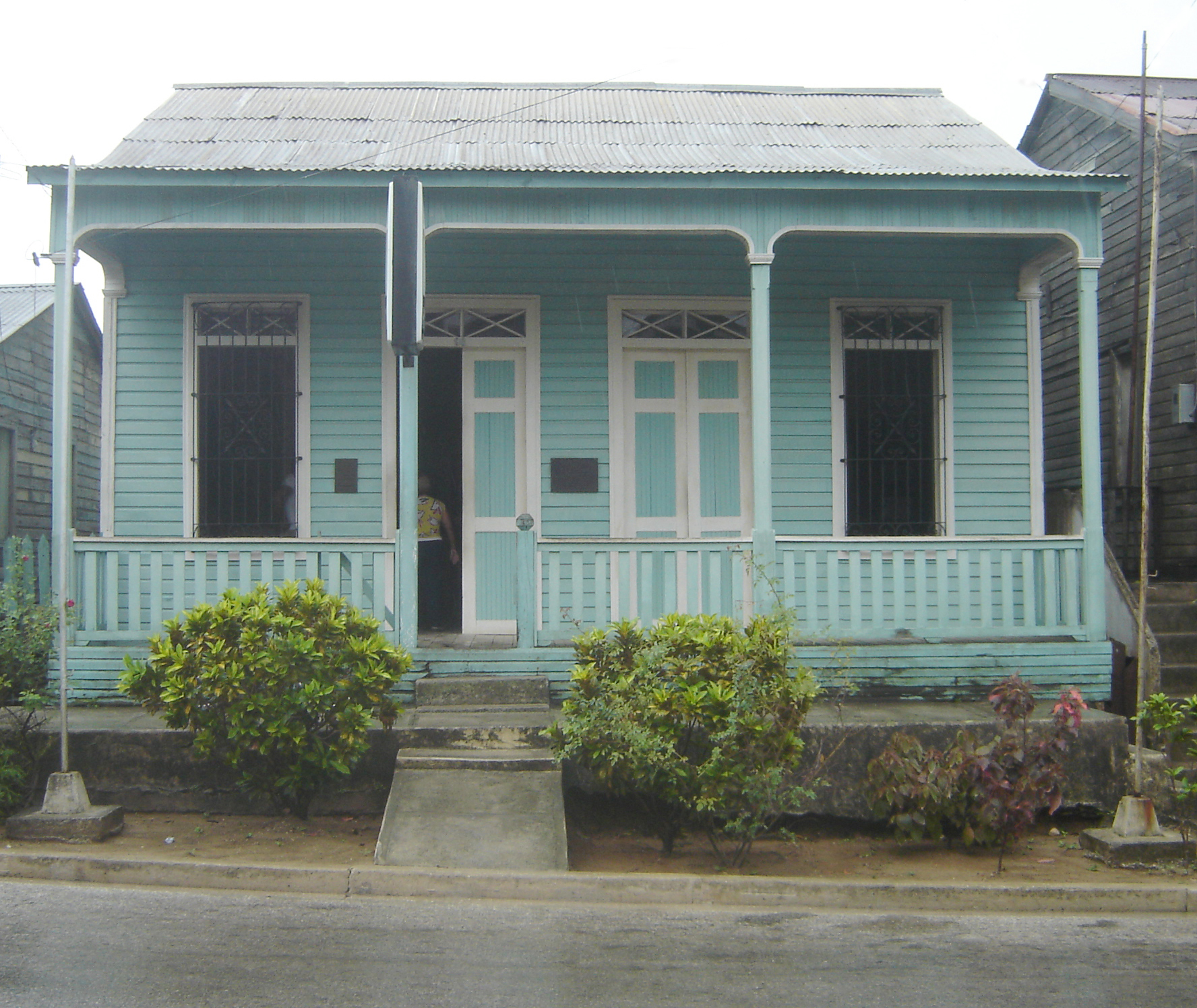
- Municipal Museum

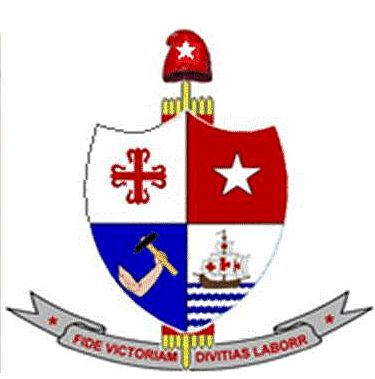
- Coat of arms

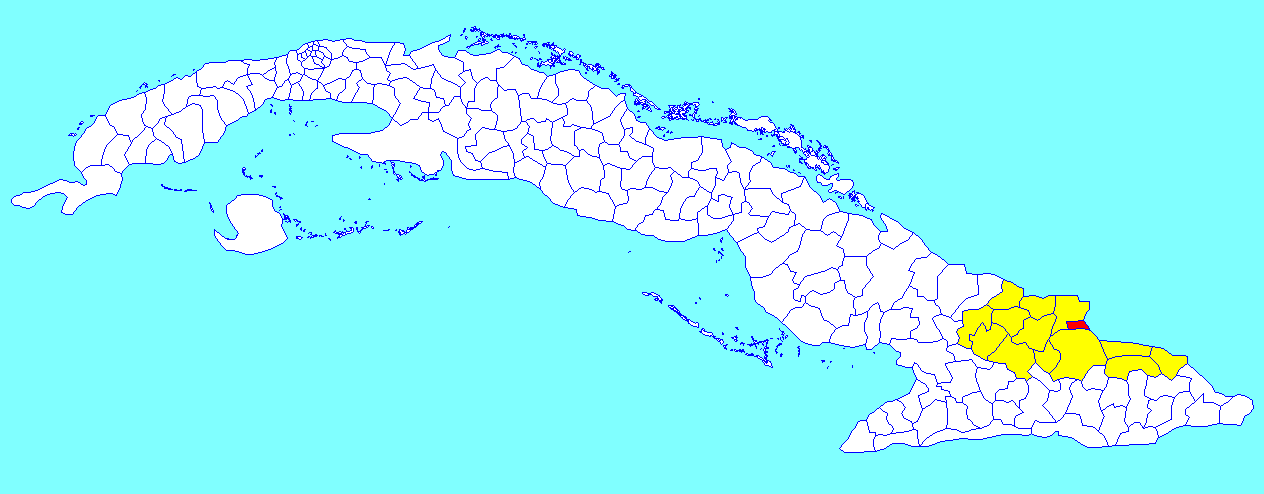
- Antilla municipality (red) within Holguín Province (yellow) and Cuba
- Coordinates: 20°50′28″N 75°43′14″W
- Country: Cuba
- Province: Holguín
- Established: January 21 1925

Area
  - Total: 101 km^{2} (39 sq mi)
- Elevation: 5 m (16 ft)

Population (2022)
  - Total: 21,332
  - Density: 211/km^{2} (547/sq mi)
- Time zone: UTC-5 (EST)
- Area code: +53-24
- Website: Municipality website

Antilla is a municipality in Holguín Province of Cuba. It was founded in January 21, 1925 as a railroad terminal and port town.

== Geography ==
It is located on the north-eastern shore of Cuba, on a peninsula between the Gulf of Nipe and Banes Bay. The municipality covers 101 km^{2} (39 sq mi) and contains the communities of Bijarú, Canalito, Cortaderas, Deleite, Este Cabecera, Los Novillos, Oeste Cabecera, San Jerónimo and Sao de los Hidalgos.

== Demographics ==
In 2021, the municipality of Antilla had a population of 21,332. With a total area of 101 km^{2} (39 sq mi), it has a population density of 210/km^{2} (540/sq mi).

== Notable people ==
- Pablo Ferro (1935–2018), Cuban-American graphic designer and film titles designer

== See also ==
- List of cities in Cuba
- Municipalities of Cuba
