= Treasure of the Moon Goddess =

- Theatrical release poster
- Directed by: José Luis García Agraz
- Screenplay by: Eric Weston and Asher Brauner
- Based on: Story by J.P. Deuttilleux
- Produced by: Gerald Green
- Starring: Asher Brauner; Don Calfa; Linnea Quigley; Jo Ann Ayres
- Cinematography: Timothy Ross
- Edited by: Chic Ciccolini; Gabrielle Gilbert
- Music by: Victor Hall and Stephen Metz
- Distributed by: Ascot Entertainment Group
- Release date: 1987
- Running time: 90 minutes
- Countries: United States; Mexico
- Languages: English; Spanish

Treasure of the Moon Goddess is a 1987 Mexican-American adventure film by award-winning director José Luis García Agraz, starring Asher Brauner, Don Calfa, Linnea Quigley and Jo Ann Ayres. The plot concerns a pop singer who is kidnapped by pirates while touring Central America because of her resemblance to a native moon goddess.

== Cast ==
- Asher Brauner as Sam Kidd
- Don Calfa as Harold Grand
- Linnea Quigley as Lu De Belle
- Jo-Ann Ayer as Brandy
- Danny Addis as Diaz
- Danny Addis as Imal
- Rene Pereyra as Carlos
- Enrique Lucero as Tupac
- Ramon Barragan as Louis
- Eric Weston as Treasure Thief
- Antonio Sanchez as Diaz Thug
