= Asher Brauner =

American actor (1946–2021)

- Born: October 25, 1946; Chicago, Illinois, U.S.
- Died: January 2, 2021 (aged 74)
- Occupation: Actor
- Years active: 1973–2003

Asher Brauner (October 25, 1946 – January 2, 2021) was an American actor.

Brauner appeared in the 1975 action film, Switchblade Sisters, directed by Jack Hill, and his other film credits include roles in Two-Minute Warning (1976), The Boss' Son (1978), Where the Boys Are '84 (1984), Escape from El Diablo (1984), Treasure of the Moon Goddess (1987), Merchants of War (1989) and American Eagle (1989). He also appeared opposite Wings Hauser in the 1990 films Coldfire and Living to Die. He had numerous television acting credits including General Hospital, Ironside, Kojak and Harry O, and TV movies such as Alexander: The Other Side of Dawn (1977) and Young Joe, the Forgotten Kennedy (1977).

Brauner died on January 2, 2021, at the age of 74.

== Filmography ==
=== Film ===
Year	Title	Role	Notes
1975	Kitty Can't Help It	B.J.	
1975	Switchblade Sisters	Dominic	
1976	Two-Minute Warning	The S.W.A.T. Team - McCoy	
1978	The Boss' Son	Bobby Rose	
1982	Making Love	Ted	
1983	California Cowboys	Thrasher	
1984	Where the Boys Are	Officer Ernie Gasso	
1987	Steele Justice	Mob Thug #1	
1987	Treasure of the Moon Goddess	Sam Kidd	
1989	Merchants of War	Nick Drennen	
1989	American Eagle	Max Shane	
1990	Coldfire	Dix	
1990	Living to Die	Edward 'Eddie' Minton	
1993	Deadly Exposure	Harry	Uncredited
2003	The Killer Within Me	Vito	Direct-to-video; final role

=== Television ===
Year	Title	Role	Notes
1973	Ironside	Sergeant Henry	Episode: "The Armageddon Gang"
1973	Blood Sport	C.C.	TV movie
1974–1975	Kojak	Crater / James Sperry	2 episodes
1975	Harry O	Silk	Episode: "Exercise in Fatality"
1977	The Strange Possession of Mrs. Oliver	Dance Partner in Bar	TV movie
1977	Alexander: The Other Side of Dawn	Buddy	TV movie
1977	Young Joe, the Forgotten Kennedy	Mike Krasna	TV movie
1977	Barnaby Jones	Duke Moran	Episode: "Gang War"
1979	Quincy, M.E.	Dr. Tompkins	Episode: "Physician, Heal Thyself"
1979	General Hospital	Roy DiLucca	Episode: "October 4, 1979"
1980	B.A.D. Cats	Officer Nick Donovan	10 episodes
1981	Margin for Murder	Jerry Adams	TV movie
1982	The Fall Guy	Lance	Episode: "Charlie"
1982	One Shoe Makes It Murder	Rudy	TV movie
1984	The New Mike Hammer		Episode: "The Perfect Twenty"; uncredited
1984	Jessie	Pat	Episode: "McLaughlin's Flame"
1985	Magnum, P.I.	Darryl Jacobs	Episode: "A Pretty Good Dancing Chicken"
1986	Airwolf	Quist	Episode: "Discovery"
1986	Matlock	Harry Landers	Episode: "The Cop"
1987	Beauty and the Beast	Mitch Denton	Episode: "Beast Within"
1988–1992	Jake and the Fatman	Iceman / Arthur 'Arty' Felix	2 episodes
1990	Hunter	Edward Gibbs	Episode: "Where Echoes End"
1992	Reasonable Doubts	Showell	Episode: "Silence"
