= Me Myself & I (film) =

1992 film by Pablo Ferro

- VHS cover
- Directed by: Pablo Ferro
- Written by: Julian Barry
- Produced by: Pablo Ferro
- Starring: JoBeth Williams; George Segal
- Cinematography: James Glennon
- Edited by: Allen Ferro
- Music by: Odette Springer
- Distributed by: I.R.S. Media
- Release date: June 1, 1992
- Running time: 97 minutes
- Country: United States

Me Myself & I is a 1992 American romantic comedy film starring JoBeth Williams and George Segal. The film is the directorial debut of Cuban-American graphic designer Pablo Ferro. Bill Macy, Shelley Hack and Ruth Gilbert also appear in this independent film.

== Plot ==
Buddy Arnett, a writer, falls in love with Diane, who has multiple personality disorder. As he gets closer to her, must learn how to navigate her various, very different, sometimes volatile personalities.

== Cast ==
- JoBeth Williams ... Crazy Diane / Sane Diane
- George Segal ... Buddy Arnett
- Don Calfa ... Irving
- Shelley Hack ... Jennifer
- Betsy Lynn George ... Jailbait
- Bill Macy ... Sydney
- Sharon McNight ... Jailbait's Mom
- Ruth Gilbert ... Mrs. Landesman
- Cheryl Paris ... Aunt Felicia
- Hartley Haverty ... Kim Trombitas
- Nicholas Kadi ... Saudi Prince
- Jaid Barrymore ... Lucy Lindell
- Sheila Scott-Wilkenson ... Katherine
- Jennifer Ashley ... T.V. Show Host
- Paul Cavonis ... Ronnie Pauson (Award Presenter)

== Production ==
Iconic singer-songwriter Harry Nilsson composed and performed the theme song, which played over the film's opening credit sequence.
