= Hector and the Search for Happiness (film) =

2014 film

- Theatrical release poster
- Directed by: Peter Chelsom
- Screenplay by: Peter Chelsom; Tinker Lindsay; Maria von Heland
- Based on: Hector and the Search for Happiness by François Lelord
- Produced by: Klaus Dohle; Trish Dolman; Christine Haebler; Phil Hunt; Compton Ross; Judy Tossell
- Starring: Simon Pegg; Toni Collette; Rosamund Pike; Stellan Skarsgård; Jean Reno; Veronica Ferres; Barry Atsma; Christopher Plummer
- Cinematography: Kolja Brandt
- Edited by: Claus Wehlisch
- Music by: Dan Mangan; Jesse Zubot
- Production companies: Egoli Tossell Film; Film Afrika Worldwide; Erfttal Film; German Federal Film Board; Screen Siren Pictures
- Distributed by: Koch Media (United Kingdom); Wild Bunch (German-speaking Europe); Entertainment One (Canada); Relativity Media (United States)
- Release date: 15 August 2014
- Running time: 120 minutes
- Countries: United Kingdom; Germany; Canada; South Africa; United States
- Language: English
- Budget: £9.1 million
- Box office: $6.3 million

Hector and the Search for Happiness is a 2014 comedy-drama film directed by Peter Chelsom and co-written by Chelsom with Tinker Lindsay and Maria von Heland, based on François Lelord's novel of the same name. The film stars Simon Pegg as Hector and Rosamund Pike as Clara.

== Plot ==
Hector is a quirky psychiatrist who has become increasingly tired of his humdrum life. He tells his girlfriend, Clara, that he needs to go on a journey to research happiness. On a flight to China, he is seated next to Edward, a cranky businessman. Edward takes Hector to a very exclusive nightclub in Shanghai, where Hector meets a young woman named Ying Li and instantly falls for her.

He asks to meet Ying Li's family. She declines, ashamed of how she makes her living. Their date is interrupted by her pimp, who takes Ying Li away by force. Hector then ventures into the mountains and visits a monastery, where he befriends their leader and talks briefly with Clara via Skype.

Hector departs on a terrifying plane ride to Africa, where a woman invites him to her family's house for sweet potato stew, and gives him a book about happiness written by one Professor Coreman. Hector meets up with his old friend Michael, a physician, with his bodyguard Marcel, and later meets a quick-tempered drug lord named Diego Baresco, who doesn't believe in happiness because his wife is unhappy due to her medication. After inquiring about these medications, Hector draws up a new list of drugs for her to take, using a pen loaned to him by Baresco.

Hector discovers that Marcel is Michael's lover, and they are happy. He Skypes again with Clara, who is going out in a fancy gown and seems uninterested in talking to him. He visits the local woman whom he befriended on the plane and her family for dinner. On the way home, his vehicle is carjacked, and Hector is kidnapped and locked in a cell with a lonely rat. When the kidnappers decide to kill him, Hector claims to be friends with Diego to save himself but cannot prove it. With a gun pointed at his head, Hector asks if he can make one final note in his book about what brings his captors happiness. When his captors give Hector the pen that fell from his book, Hector discovers that Baresco engraved his name onto the pen, thus proving his connection to the drug lord. Upon his release, Hector makes his way back to the village where he celebrates with the locals.

While flying to Los Angeles, Hector attends to a woman with a brain tumor. Hector then goes to the beach in Santa Monica and encounters Agnes, an old girlfriend, who is now happily married with children. Hector calls Clara and they break up in an argument.

Agnes and Hector meet with Professor Coreman, who is studying the effects of happiness on the brain. During a lecture, Coreman points out that people shouldn't be concerned with the pursuit of happiness, but with the happiness of pursuit. Agnes and Hector check out a project Coreman has been working on, which monitors brain activity in real time and how it reacts to different emotions.

Agnes is instructed to go into an isolated room and think about three things: times when she was happy, sad and scared. Through his brain-scanning technology, Coreman is able to tell in which order she thought about the three emotions. When Hector takes his turn, he thinks about Clara marrying someone else, about his time being kidnapped, and about Ying Li, but his emotions are strangely blocked. He receives a call from remorseful Clara, who tells him she wants to be a mother. Hector explains what he's learned, that the most unhappy thing he could imagine would be to lose her. Suddenly Hector's brain scan erupts with a flurry of activity, mimicking the colored flags from the monastery and revealing that true happiness isn't just one emotion; it's all of them. Having finally achieved his own happiness, Hector rushes home and marries Clara.

== Cast ==
- Simon Pegg as Hector
- Toni Collette as Agnes
- Rosamund Pike as Clara
- Stellan Skarsgård as Edward
- Jean Reno as Diego Baresco
- Veronica Ferres as Anjali
- Barry Atsma as Michael
- Ming Zhao as Ying Li
- Togo Igawa as Old Monk
- Christopher Plummer as Professor Coreman
- Tracy-Ann Oberman as Pathetic Jane
- Bruce Fontaine as Malcolm
- Chad Willet as Alan
- Bernard Cuffling as Professor Niedorf
- Jakob Davies as Young Hector
- Hlubi Mboya as Pretty Cousin

== Production ==
On 19 May 2012, Simon Pegg was cast in the title role, Hector. On 6 September 2012, Rosamund Pike and Christopher Plummer joined the cast of the film. Pike played Clara while Plummer played Professor Coreman. On 1 November 2012, Stellan Skarsgård also joined the cast, playing Edward. German actress Veronica Ferres also joined the film, playing a clairvoyant who has lost her ability to see into the future. The film began production in January 2013. On 2 April 2013, Toni Collette and Jean Reno joined the cast of the film, along with Jakob Davies. The film was made on a £9 million ($15 million) production budget.

Relativity Media acquired the US distribution rights to the film, and released the film there on 19 September 2014.

== Marketing ==
The first trailer was released on 5 February 2014. Another trailer was released on 21 June. An international trailer for the film was released on 15 July 2014. On 22 July, the final trailer for the film was released.

== Release ==
The film was released in the United Kingdom by Koch Film on 15 August 2014. Relativity Media released the film in the United States on 19 September 2014. It was screened in the Special Presentations section of the 2014 Toronto International Film Festival.

== Reception ==
Hector and the Search for Happiness has been met with generally mixed to negative reviews. On Rotten Tomatoes, the film holds a rating of 37%, based on 86 reviews, with an average rating of 4.62/10. The consensus states, "Simon Pegg remains as charming as ever, but Hector and the Search for Happiness drowns his appeal in schmaltz." On Metacritic, the film holds a score of 29 out of 100, based on 28 critics, indicating "generally unfavorable reviews".
