= B.A.D. Cats =

American action/police drama

- Genre: Action; Crime drama
- Written by: Al Martinez; David Harmon; Shorty Rogers
- Directed by: Bernard L. Kowalski; Sutton Roley; Ted Post
- Starring: Asher Brauner; Steve Hanks; Michelle Pfeiffer; Vic Morrow; LaWanda Page; Jimmie Walker
- Composers: Barry De Vorzon; Andy Kulberg; Mundell Lowe
- Country of origin: United States
- Original language: English
- No. of seasons: 1
- No. of episodes: 10 (4 unaired)

Production
- Executive producers: Douglas S. Cramer; Aaron Spelling
- Producer: Everett Chambers
- Cinematography: Archie R. Dalzell
- Editors: Michael F. Anderson; Terence Anderson
- Camera setup: Single-camera
- Running time: 45–48 minutes
- Production company: Aaron Spelling Productions

Original release
- Network: ABC
- Release: January 4 – November 15, 1980

B.A.D. Cats is an American action/police drama that aired on ABC from January until February 1980 on Friday nights at 8 PM Eastern time. The series stars Asher Brauner, Steve Hanks, and Michelle Pfeiffer in one of her first major acting roles.

== Synopsis ==
Nick Donovan (Brauner) and Ocee James (Hanks) were two former race car drivers who joined the Los Angeles Police Department as part of the "B.A.D. C.A.T." Squad (a double acronym for "Burglary Auto Detail–Commercial Auto Theft"). Using their superior driving skills, the two mainly saw fit to run the bad guys off the road rather than question them. Their superior, Captain Nathan (Vic Morrow) publicly chastised the two, but privately encouraged their "loose cannon" style. Officer Samantha Jensen (Pfeiffer) would occasionally lend a hand when a more feminine approach was called for. Also seen were Ma (LaWanda Page), who owned a bar which the boys frequented, and Rodney (Jimmie Walker), a former car thief trying to get on the straight and narrow.

== Cast ==
- Asher Brauner as Officer Nick Donovan
- Steve Hanks as Officer Ocee James
- Vic Morrow as Captain Eugene Nathan
- LaWanda Page as Ma
- Michelle Pfeiffer as Samantha "Sunshine" Jensen
- Penny Santon as Mrs. Bernardi
- Jimmie Walker as Rodney Washington

== Episodes ==
No.	Title	Directed by	Written by	Original release date
1	"Pilot"	Bernard L. Kowalski	Al Martinez	January 4, 1980
2	"The Good-Time Girls"	Unknown	Unknown	January 11, 1980
3	"I Want It or You"	Unknown	Unknown	January 18, 1980
4	"Life and Death of a Beauty Queen"	Unknown	Unknown	January 25, 1980
5	"Semi-Paradise"	Unknown	Unknown	February 1, 1980
6	"Let's Put Sam Away"	Unknown	Unknown	February 8, 1980
7	"Bomb!"	TBD	TBD	UNAIRED
8	"Die, Cheerleader, Die"	TBD	TBD	UNAIRED
9	"Death Car"	TBD	TBD	UNAIRED
10	"Running Home"	TBD	TBD	UNAIRED
