= The Mighty =

1998 drama film directed by Peter Chelsom

- Theatrical release poster by John Alvin
- Directed by: Peter Chelsom
- Screenplay by: Charles Leavitt
- Based on: Freak the Mighty by Rodman Philbrick
- Produced by: Simon Fields; Jane Startz; Don Carmody
- Starring: Sharon Stone; Gena Rowlands; Gillian Anderson; Harry Dean Stanton; Kieran Culkin; James Gandolfini; Elden Ratliff
- Cinematography: John de Borman
- Edited by: Martin Walsh
- Music by: Trevor Jones
- Production company: Scholastic Productions
- Distributed by: Miramax Films
- Release date: October 9, 1998
- Running time: 100 minutes
- Country: United States
- Language: English
- Budget: $100,000
- Box office: $6.2 million

The Mighty is a 1998 American coming of age buddy comedy-drama film directed by Peter Chelsom and written by Charles Leavitt. Based on the book Freak the Mighty by Rodman Philbrick, it stars Sharon Stone, Gena Rowlands, Gillian Anderson, Harry Dean Stanton, Kieran Culkin, James Gandolfini, and Elden Henson.

The film received positive reviews from critics and grossed $6.1 million on a $100,000 budget. For her performance, Stone received a Golden Globe Award nomination for Best Supporting Actress.

== Plot ==
13-year-old Kevin "Freak" Dillon suffers from Morquio syndrome and lives with his mother Gwen "Fair Gwen" Dillon. Due to his disability, he walks with leg braces and crutches. Meanwhile, 15-year-old Maxwell "Max" Kane has learning challenges and lives with his maternal grandparents Susan "Gram" and Elton "Grim" Pinneman. He has flunked the seventh grade twice and is tormented by teenage delinquent Tony "Blade" Fowler, who leads the "Doghouse Boys", a bully gang. Kevin is assigned as Max's reading tutor.

Kevin and Max go to a festival to watch a firework show and get attacked by Blade's gang. The two escape into a lake with Kevin riding on Max's shoulders. Max subsequently starts carrying Kevin around on his shoulders during their adventures. During a visit to a museum, Kevin uses Sir Galahad's sword to knight them as "Freak the Mighty."

Kevin witnesses Blade's gang putting someone's purse in a sewer. The two retrieve the purse but are confronted by the gang. They attempt to attack Kevin, but Max stops them by picking up a manhole cover and throwing it at the gang, who flee in panic. The purse belongs to a woman named Loretta Lee, so Max and Kevin return it to her. Loretta is married to former gang leader Iggy. The couple are old friends of Max's father Kenny "Killer" Kane, who is in prison for the murder of Max's mother.

On Christmas Eve, Kenny kidnaps Max after being released on parole and takes him to Iggy and Loretta's apartment. Loretta tries to help Max escape, but Kenny catches her and attempts to strangle her. Max's seeing the attack prompts a repressed memory of Kenny murdering his mother; he breaks free of his bonds, rants about the memory, and attacks Kenny.

After tracking Max and Kenny, Kevin breaks in, armed with a squirt gun that he lies is loaded with sulfuric acid. He sprays it in Kenny's eyes. Before an angered Kenny regains himself and attempts to hurt Kevin, Max tackles him through the wall where the police are waiting; Kenny is then returned to prison for life without the possibility of parole while Kevin and Max run home to have Christmas dinner with Gwen, Grim, and Gram. While exchanging Christmas gifts, Kevin gives Max a blank book and tells him to write in it.

That night, Kevin dies in his sleep due to heart problems. The following weeks, Max continues attending school but spends his spare time locked in the basement, missing Kevin's funeral and seeing Gwen moving away. He later runs into Loretta at a bus stop, who says that "doing nothing's a drag, kid". He takes this advice to heart and decides to write all the adventures he had with Kevin in the blank book. Max gets writer's block on the last page and puts an illustration of King Arthur's grave which reads "Here Lies King Arthur, Once and Future King". Max then takes Kevin's ornithopter and winds it up, making it fly.

== Cast ==
- Elden Henson as Maxwell "Max" Kane, an over-sized but kind-hearted 15-year-old boy with dyslexia who lives with his grandparents. His mother was murdered by his father Kenny "Killer" Kane. He has failed seventh grade twice and is tormented by Tony "Blade" Fowler, the leader of a youth gang. When Kevin is assigned as Max's reading tutor, they forge a friendship through similar circumstances, including being outcasts and parental abandonment (Kevin's father heard the word "birth defect" and disappeared).
- Kieran Culkin as Kevin Dillon/Freak, a 13-year-old boy suffering from mucopolysaccharidosis IV, or Morquio syndrome. He is extremely intelligent and prone to fantasies, but is disabled and forced to walk with crutches and a brace. He and his mother, Gwen, moved to Cincinnati near Max and his grandparents to start a new life. From the moment they met, they didn't get along, but gradually became friends.
- Sharon Stone as Gwen "The Fair Gwen of Air" Dillon, Kevin's mother, is responsible and loving. She loves her son very much and makes sure nothing happens to him.
- Gena Rowlands as Susan "Gram" Pinneman, Max's grandmother
- Harry Dean Stanton as Elton "Grim" Pinneman, Max's grandfather.
- James Gandolfini as Kenny "Killer" Kane, Max's father. He was a psychopathic killer who strangled his wife in front of their son, Maxwell. Afterward, Kenny put Max to bed and told him he was dreaming. Although Max knew his father was lying, he was too traumatized to do anything about it; he even dismissed the idea of testifying against him for fear of what Kenny might do to him. He was then confronted by Max and Kevin, and the police arrived to catch him, and he was eventually arrested.
- Gillian Anderson as Loretta Lee, Iggy's wife.
- Meat Loaf as Iggy Lee, Kenny's friend and Loretta's husband, with whom he shared a prison cell years ago.
- Jenifer Lewis as Mrs. Addison
- Joseph Perrino as Tony "Blade" Fowler, The school bully and leader of the Doghouse Boys gang. He teases Max for being bigger than the other boys in the class and Kevin for being disabled. He was confronted by Max when he showed his courage.
- Eve Crawford as Mrs. Donelli
- John Bourgeois as Mr. Sacker
- Dov Tiefenbach as Doghouse Boy #1
- Michael Colton as Doghouse Boy #2
- Daniel Lee as Doghouse Boy #3

== Reception ==
The Mighty received generally positive reviews from critics. On Rotten Tomatoes, it holds a 75% rating, based on 40 reviews, with an average of 6.80/10. The site’s critics consensus states: "Spirited and sweet with an emphasis on the healing power of friendship, The Mighty is a modest charmer that comes by its whimsy honestly."

Roger Ebert of the Chicago Sun-Times gave the film three out of four stars and wrote, "What I liked most about the movie is the way it shows that imagination can be a weapon in life."

== Accolades ==
Sharon Stone was nominated for a Golden Globe Award for Best Performance by an Actress in a Supporting Role in a Motion Picture. At the 20th Young Artist Awards, the film was nominated for Best Performance in a Feature Film for Kieran Culkin, and Best Family Feature - Drama.

The song "The Mighty" by Sting was nominated for a Golden Globe Award for Best Original Song - Motion Picture. It won Best Original Song at the Las Vegas Film Critics Society Awards.
