= Bill Macy =

American actor (1922–2019)

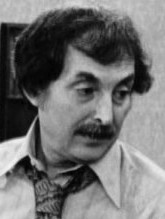
- Macy in Maude (1973)
- Born: Wolf Martin Garber; May 18, 1922; Revere, Massachusetts, U.S.
- Died: October 17, 2019 (aged 97); Los Angeles, California, U.S.
- Occupation: Actor
- Years active: 1958–2011
- Spouse: Samantha Harper (m. 1975)

Wolf Martin Garber (May 18, 1922 – October 17, 2019), known professionally as Bill Macy, was an American television, film, and stage actor. He was best known for his role of Walter Findlay on the CBS sitcom Maude (1972–1978).

== Early life ==
Bill Macy was born Wolf Martin Garber on May 18, 1922, in Revere, Massachusetts, the son of Mollie (née Friedopfer; 1889–1986) and Michael Garber (1884–1974), a manufacturer.

He was raised Jewish in the East Flatbush section of Brooklyn, New York. After graduating from Samuel J. Tilden High School he served in the United States Army from 1942 to 1946 with the 594th Engineer Boat and Shore Regiment, stationed in the Philippines, New Guinea and Japan.

He worked as a cab driver for a decade before being cast as Walter Matthau's understudy in Once More, with Feeling on Broadway in 1958. He portrayed a cab driver on the soap opera The Edge of Night in 1966.

Macy was an original cast member of the 1969–1972 Off-Broadway revue Oh! Calcutta!, performing in the show from 1969 to 1971. He later appeared in the 1972 movie version of the musical. Of appearing fully nude with the rest of the cast in the stage show, he said, "The nudity didn't bother me. I'm from Brooklyn."

Macy performed on the P. D. Q. Bach album The Stoned Guest (1970).

== Television ==
Appreciating Macy's comedic skills off Broadway, Norman Lear brought him to Hollywood, where he first got a small part as a police officer in All in the Family. He was cast in the role of Walter Findlay, the husband of the title character on the 1970s television sitcom Maude, starring Bea Arthur. The show ran for six seasons from 1972 to 1978.

"He was a rare and great comic actor. There was only one Bill Macy."

— Norman Lear

Strangers on the street often called him "Mr. Maude", consoling him for having such a difficult wife. "I used to tell them that people like that really existed," Macy explained.

In 1975, Macy and Samantha Harper Macy appeared on the game show Tattletales.

Macy guest-starred in two episodes of Highway to Heaven in 1985 and 1988, playing a different character in each episode. In 1986, he was a guest on the fourth episode of L.A. Law, playing an older man whose young wife wants a music career. Macy appeared in the television movie Perry Mason: The Case of the Murdered Madam (1987) as banker Richard Wilson. He appeared on The Facts of Life in a 1988 episode. He occasionally appeared on Seinfeld as one of the residents of the Florida retirement community where Jerry Seinfeld's parents lived. Macy made a guest appearance as a patient on Chicago Hope and as an aging gambler on the series Las Vegas. Macy's last television role was in a 2010 episode of Jada Pinkett Smith's series Hawthorne.

== Film ==
Macy appeared as the jury foreman in The Producers in 1967, with the memorable sole line "We find the defendants incredibly guilty". Other memorable roles include the co-inventor of the "Opti-Grab" in the 1979 Steve Martin comedy The Jerk and as the head television writer in My Favourite Year (1982).

Other film credits included roles in Death at Love House (1976), The Late Show (1977), Serial (1980), Movers & Shakers (1985), Bad Medicine (1985), Tales from the Darkside (1985 - "Lifebomb" episode), Sibling Rivalry (1990), The Doctor (1991), Me Myself & I (1992), Analyze This (1999), Surviving Christmas (2004), The Holiday (2006), and Mr. Woodcock (2007).

== Personal life and death ==
Macy met his future wife, Samantha Harper, on the set of Oh! Calcutta! in 1969. They married in 1975.

Macy died in Los Angeles on October 17, 2019, at the age of 97; no cause was given.

== Filmography/television ==
Year(s)	Title	Role	Notes
1967	The Producers	Jury Foreman	Uncredited
1972	Oh! Calcutta!	Monte / Mute Physician	
1972–1978	Maude	Walter Findlay	Main role; 141 episodes
1977	The Late Show	Charlie Hatter	
1979	The Jerk	Stan Fox	
1980	Serial	Sam	
1982	My Favorite Year	Sy Benson	
1985	Movers & Shakers	Sid Spokane	
1985	Bad Medicine	Dr. Gerald Marx	
1986	Murder, She Wrote	Myron Kinkaid	Episode: "Corned Beef & Carnage"
1988	The Law & Harry McGraw	Marvin Gershowitz	Episode: "Waiting Game"
1990	Sibling Rivalry	Pat	
1991	The Doctor	Al Cade	
1992	Me Myself & I	Sydney	
1994	Diagnosis: Murder	Eugene McReedy	Episode: "The Busy Body"
1999	Analyze This	Dr. Isaac Sobel	
2004	Surviving Christmas	Doo-Dah	
2006	The Holiday	Ernie	
2006	Las Vegas	Sharkey	
2007	Mr. Woodcock	Mr. Woodcock's Dad	
