= François Lelord =

French psychiatrist and author (born 1953)

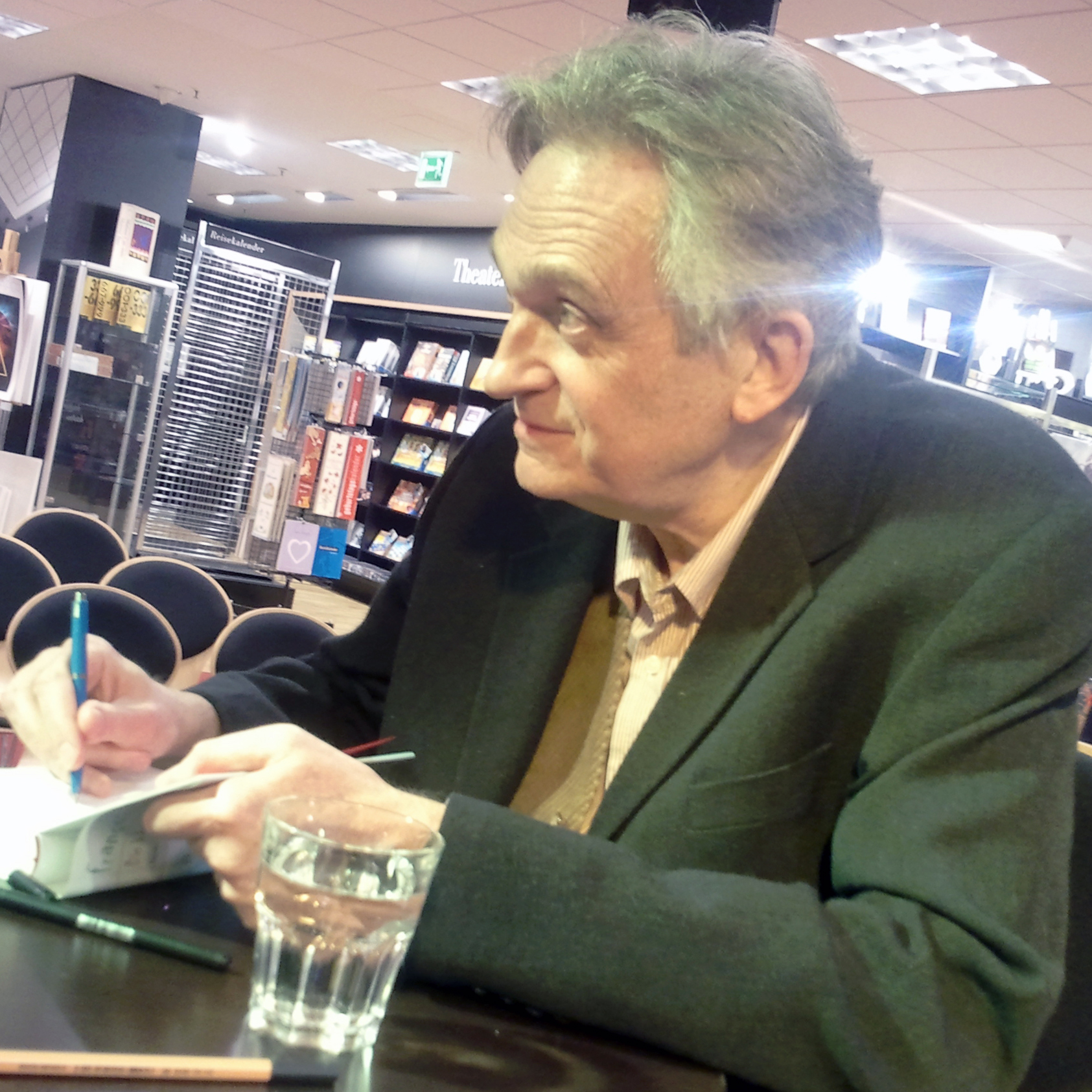

François Lelord (born 22 June 1953 in Paris) is a French psychiatrist and author.

== Career as a psychiatrist ==
Lelord studied medicine and psychology; after getting his doctoral degree in 1985, he was a post-doctorate researcher with Robert Liberman at the University of California, Los Angeles. After that, he worked as an attending physician at Hôpital Necker (which is affiliated with Descartes University) in Paris for two years. In 1989, he opened up his own practice, which he closed down in 1996 to work as an advisor on stress and job satisfaction for several companies. Since 2004, he has been working as a psychiatrist in Hanoi and Ho Chi Minh City.

== Career as an author ==
He has written several psychological monographs together with Christoph André.

His first novel, Le voyage d'Hector ou la recherche du bonheur ("Hector's Voyage or the Search for Happiness"), was very successful in France as well as other countries such as Germany. It is a book on psychology written for ordinary readers; it tells the story of Hector, a psychiatrist, who travels around the world in search of what it is that makes people happy. The book is written in a simple, humorous style, and gives psychological advice and thought-provoking impulses without even touching dry theory.

Lelord continues to publish novels dealing with similar topics which are written in a similar manner.

Following its European success, Penguin Group (USA) acquired the rights to publish Lelord's debut novel in the United States. Hector and the Search for Happiness was released on 31 August 2010. This was followed by Hector and the Secrets of Love on 1 January 2011 and Hector and the Search for Lost Time on 31 July 2012.

A film adaptation of Hector and the Search for Happiness starring Simon Pegg as the title character was released in 2014.

== Bibliography ==
- La gestion du stress (1998), with Christophe André and Patrick Légeron
- Liberté pour les insensés (2000)
- Comment gérer les personnalités difficiles (2000), with Christophe André
- L'estime de soi : S'aimer pour mieux vivre avec les autres (2001), with Christophe André
- Le voyage d'Hector ou la recherche du bonheur (2002)
- La Force des émotions (2003), with Christophe André
- Ulik au pays du désordre amoureux (2005)
- Hector et les secrets de l'amour (2005)
- Hector et le temps (2006)
- Petit hector apprend la vie (2010)
