= The Last Book in the Universe =

Book by Rodman Philbrick

- First edition
- Author: Rodman Philbrick
- Language: English
- Genre: Science fiction series
- Publisher: Blue Sky Press
- Publication date: March 1, 2002
- Publication place: USA
- Media type: Print (Hardcover and Paperback)
- Pages: 223
- ISBN: 9780439087599

The Last Book in the Universe is a 2000 post-apocalyptic science fiction novel by Rodman Philbrick. Set in a cyberpunk dystopia, its protagonist and narrator is a teenage boy named Spaz who has epilepsy.

== Plot summary ==
The story is set in a dystopian future city somewhere in the United States, called the Urb, which has been disturbed by an earthquake known as "The Big Shake." The Urb is plagued by poverty, thieves, gang warfare, and the use of mind probes. Mind probes are analogous to hard drugs and enable users to temporarily escape reality through images projected in the head. Genetically improved people, called proovs, (a play on improved) live in a city called Eden, with a beautiful society, food, and water. Eden is separated from the Urb by the "Forbidden Zone," a deadly and dangerous minefield. The Urb is split up into sections called "latches." Each latch is controlled by a gang. Spaz is a teenage boy who cannot use mind probes because of his epilepsy, causing his family to abandon him. Spaz runs errands for Billy Bizmo, the latch-boss (leader) of his gang, the "Bully Bangers," in a section of the Urb. On one of his errands, Spaz is sent to "rip-off" (steal from) Ryter, a very old man who possesses the lost arts of literacy and literature.

Spaz soon meets Little Face, a five-year-old orphan who only says the word chox, because he didn't learn how to speak and Spaz first gave him choxbars to eat. Spaz also meets Lanaya, a proov, who charitably gives out "edibles" (food) to Spaz. Ryter understands Spaz's situation and does his best to help him, offering no resistance when Spaz attempts to steal his belongings. Eventually, Spaz learns that Bean, his beloved adoptive sister, is dying of leukemia. Ryter and Little Face accompany Spaz on a journey to find Bean. The trio starts by traveling through "the Pipe," a large, rusted-out water pipe that leads to other latches. In the next latch, the group sees everything burning and finds Lanaya being attacked by very hungry people. Lanaya is rescued by Spaz and Ryter, and she joins them on their journey. The group starts traveling towards the latch where Bean lives and eventually find her as well. Lanaya and Ryter decide to take Bean to Eden, along with Spaz and Little Face. They ride along in Lanaya's takvee to her "contributors" (parents), Jin and Bree's home, which is a castle in Eden.

At this point in the novel, it is brought to attention that Lanaya is a special proov who has been bred to eventually become a Master of Eden. To assume this title, she has rights and privileges that other proovs do not, which are called "learning opportunities". They take Bean to a proov hospital called the Primary and she is cured of her sickness using gene therapy. Ryter, Spaz, and Little Face enjoy the paradise of Eden. Ryter, Spaz and Bean are then thrown out of Eden because the elders who rule over Eden decide they are unacceptable. Little Face is secretly adopted by Lanaya's contributors. The elders disregard Bean's high intelligence and still discriminate against non-proovs. Lanaya reveals to the elders that the mind probes, which come from Eden, cause too much damage to the people who use them in the Urb. As a result, all the mind probes throughout the Urb are deactivated, causing rioting and anarchy outside Eden. Bean is deposited at her home, and Ryter and Spaz are returned to their latch.

Back at Spaz's home latch, Ryter is blamed for the deactivation of the mind probes and is killed by jetbikes. This triggers an epileptic seizure for Spaz. Before his death, Ryter tells Spaz that he is the last book in the universe. Billy Bizmo reveals to Spaz that he is his biological father and that his mother died at Spaz's birth.

The story ends with Lanaya sending Spaz a message about things getting better in Eden and how she believes they can fix everything in time. Spaz takes on the name Ryter, continuing the original Ryter's work, writing The Last Book in the Universe.

== Characters ==
- Spaz – the narrator and the protagonist of the book, a teenager part of the Bully Bangers who lives in the Crypts. He initially "rips off" Ryter, has a condition called epilepsy, lived on streets, got kicked out of foster home that's located in the latch of the Vandals due to his epilepsy fits.
- Ryter – a gummy (old guy) who lives in stack boxes, always accused of "backtimer" talk, writes the last book in the universe, loves adventure, and has formal talk.
- Little Face – a five-year-old child, lives in stack boxes, takes up a love for chox (chocolate-flavored edible), eventually adopted by Lanaya's contributors.
- Bean – Spaz's adoptive sister, has leukemia, the biological daughter of Charly and Kay.
- Charly – Bean's biological father, Spaz's adoptive father who casts Spaz out because of his epilepsy fits and the general fear of Spaz possibly hurting Bean with his disease.
- Kay - Spaz's adoptive, Bean's biological mother.
- Lanaya – a proov girl, loves the sense of adventure and thrill, confident, persuasive, Future Master of Eden, contribute (child) of Jin and Bree.
- Lotti Getts – the latch-boss of Vandals, located outside of Eden, nicknamed Boss Lady, The Vandal Queen, Nails, and White Widow because her luvmates (lovemates) do not stay around for a long time. She runs the latch in the Urb where Spaz's adoptive family lives.
- Bender - a very rich and jolly trader located in Lotti's latch that has connections with Vida Bleek, who gets so afraid of being asked about the mindprobes that are absolutely banned in the latch from ownership or consumption. He employs three young women who sell luv-scents (perfume/eau d'toilettes) in the most crowded part of Traderville.
- Vida Bleek – the boss of the underground traders that's said to be just as powerful as Lotti in his field, a secret probe dealer, and the head of the assassin group named Furies who are Lotti Getts's mortal enemy. After a battle with the Vandals, he gets beheaded by Lotti herself, while some of the surviving Furies getting captured in a ruined state.
- Jin – Lanaya's male contributor (parent), one of the top-ranked chess players in Eden.
- Bree – Lanaya's female contributor, takes a fondness to Little Face and secretly adopts him.
- Mongo the Magnificent – A once-powerful latchboss of the Monkey Boys who's left in his mindprobe to loop for over an entire year. He's eventually replaced by The Great Gorm who's the tek boss, the leader of the technical security guards that are tasked to defend Mongo's fort prior to the events of the book.
- Billy Bizmo - Spaz's biological father and the latchboss of the Bully Bangers, located in-between the Eastie and The Pipe.

== Major themes ==
Major themes include reading, technology, challenges and overcoming obstacles, courage, bravery, heroism, finding hope within humanity, and individuality.

== Background ==
The novel is an adaptation of a short story previously written by the author in a collection called Tomorrowland. The story was also influenced greatly by Ray Bradbury's Fahrenheit 451.

== Reception ==
The Last Book in the Universe has received mixed reviews. Many critics praised the novel for its involving plot. Debbie Carton, a reviewer from Booklist, called it a "fast-paced adventure" with a "moving conclusion" and "memorable characters." A reviewer from Publishers Weekly wrote, "[the book's] futuristic dialect combined with striking descriptions of a postmodern civilization will convincingly transport readers to Spaz's world."

However, Susan L. Rogers from School Library Journal pointed out that there are too many distractions that pull the reader's attention away from the main theme. She also noted that the science in this science fiction novel was "vague." Publishers Weekly added that the story was "not fully developed," complaining that some scenes, such as the ones involving the Monkey Boys and the Furies, were "a bit abrupt."

== Awards ==
- ALA Best Book for YAs
- Maine Lupine Award Honor
- Maryland Readers Medal
- Isinglass Teen Read Award
- YALSA 100 Best of The Best Books for the 21st Century
