= Pablo Ferro =

Cuban-American graphic designer and film titles designer

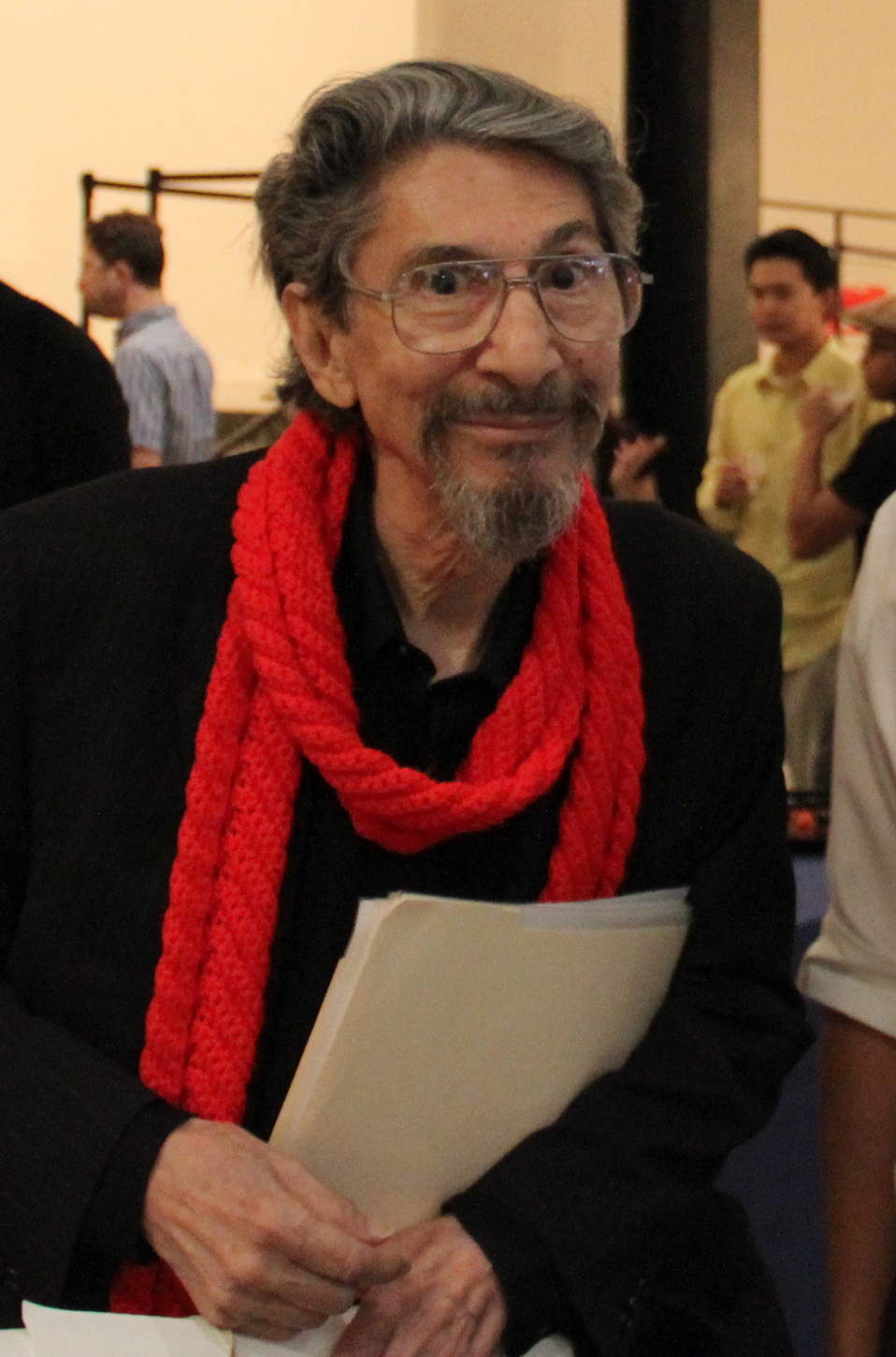
- Pablo Ferro at the AIGA in Houston, 2011
- Born: January 15, 1935; Antilla, Oriente Province, Cuba
- Died: November 16, 2018 (aged 83); Cottonwood, Arizona, United States
- Occupations: Graphic designer, Film title designer
- Years active: 1950s–2010s

Pablo Ferro (January 15, 1935 – November 16, 2018) was a Cuban-American graphic designer, film titles designer, and founder of Pablo Ferro Films.

== Childhood ==
Born in Antilla, Oriente Province, Cuba, he was raised on a remote farm before emigrating to New York with his family as a teenager. When still living in Cuba, he was very close with his grandfather during his youth and took a lot of advice from him that shaped his future. During an interview conducted by Art of the Title, Ferro talked about that advice. He helped his grandfather a lot out on the farm fields and one day, he felt a sting while working. A scorpion had stung him directly in the toe. It was a painful experience, however, when his grandfather noticed this, in the interview Ferro said his grandfather told him, "See, I told you, you gotta keep moving. If you kept moving, that wouldn't have happened". A saying that spoke to Ferro, and something he took that to his everyday life and applied it with him during his move to America, and later during his career.

== Education ==
Ferro taught himself animation from a book by Preston Blair. In the mid-1950s he began freelancing in the New York animation industry for Academy Pictures and Elektra Studios. He found his first solid job with a company that made commercials. It was while working there that he met and befriended former Disney animator Bill Tytla, who became a mentor. Another co-worker was Stan Lee, the then-future editor of Marvel Comics, with whom he created a series of science fiction adventure comics. In 1961 he became one of the partners to form Ferro, Mogubgub and Schwartz with animation stylist Fred Mogubgub and comics artist Lew Schwartz, and in 1964 he formed Pablo Ferro Films.

== Film and commercial work ==
Ferro's diverse film work ranged from the title sequence for Stanley Kubrick's Dr. Strangelove to the multi-dynamic image montage of the original The Thomas Crown Affair. He was a pioneer of quick-cut editing, multiple screen images. Ferro's visual style has influenced many in film, television, animation, commercials, novels and children's books.

A self-taught filmmaker, Ferro initially gained prominence with animations such as the first color NBC Peacock and the Burlington Mills "stitching" logo, as well as technologically novel visual presentations, including the Singer Pavilion's film at the 1964 New York World's Fair – the first time film projectors were used to create multiple-screen images.

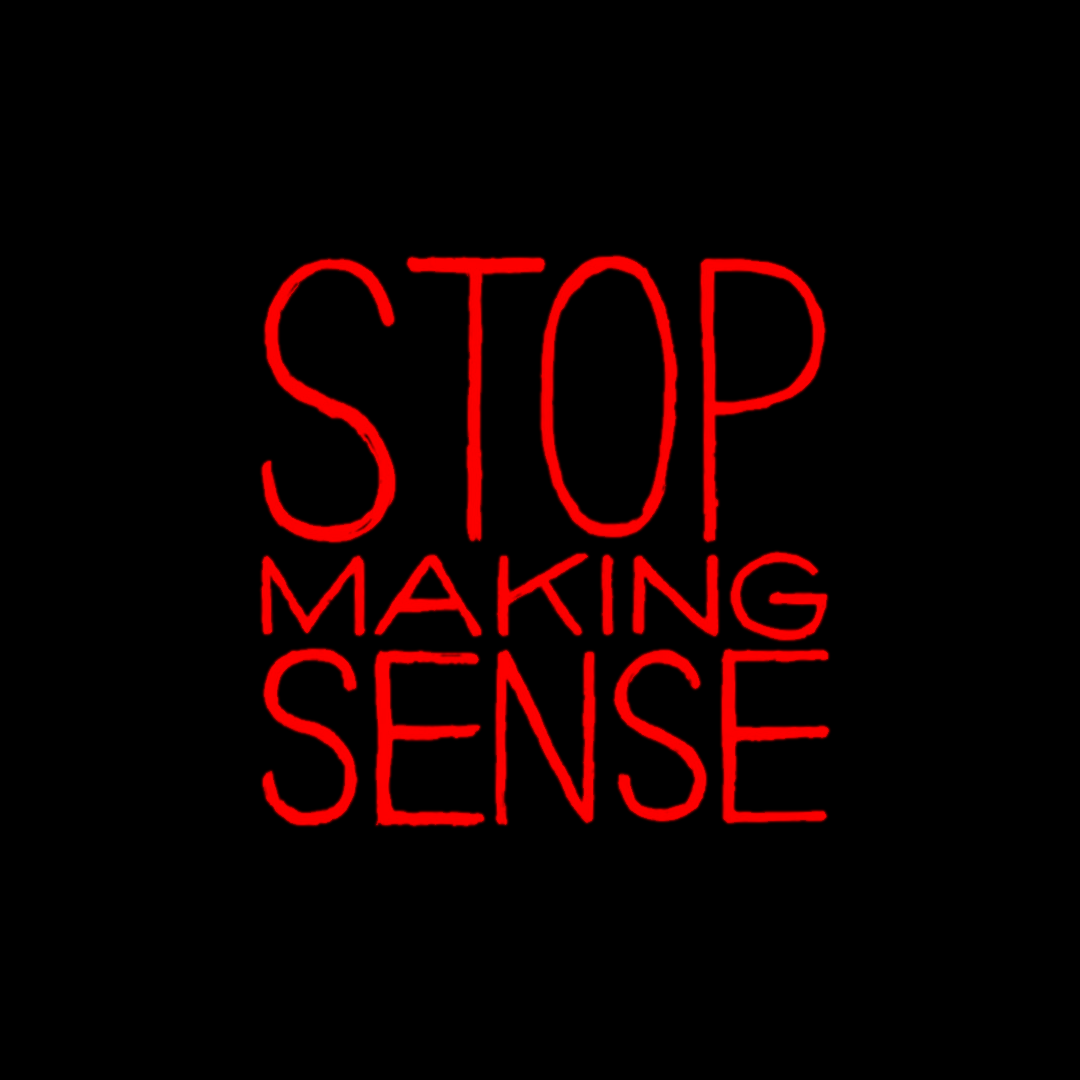
Hand-drawn lettering by Ferro for the opening credits of Stop Making Sense, 1984

Woman of Straw, Bullitt, The Russians Are Coming, the Russians Are Coming, Handle with Care, Philadelphia, Married to the Mob, Beetlejuice, and To Live and Die in L.A. are among over 100 films that have featured his creations. Ferro's hand-drawn opening segments have appeared in films ranging from Stop Making Sense and American Heart to The Addams Family and Men in Black, and his trailers have helped introduce such films as A Clockwork Orange, Jesus Christ Superstar, O Lucky Man! and Zardoz.

Ferro worked on several films with his close friend, the film director Hal Ashby, including Harold and Maude, Bound For Glory, and Being There, and also co-directed Ashby's 1983 concert film of The Rolling Stones, Let's Spend the Night Together. Ferro worked with Gus Van Sant on To Die For and Good Will Hunting. In addition to directing and producing his own feature film, Me, Myself & I (1992) with George Segal and JoBeth Williams, he performed as an actor for Robert Downey Sr. as Chief Cloud In the Head in Greaser's Palace as well as a salsa dancer in Hugo Pool.

Ferro worked as visual consultant, second-unit director on several films, such as contributing the "pornographic" effects to a special montage within Midnight Cowboy. Ferro was supervising editor on The Night They Raided Minsky's, and received a nomination in 1984 for an American Video Award (AVA) for his work as supervising editor of Michael Jackson's music video "Beat It," the first year an award was given in that category. Ferro also produced and directed numerous short films such as The Inflatable Doll.

He died of pneumonia in 2018 at the age of 83.

== Recognition ==
Ferro won over 70 national and international awards, among them numerous Clios, a DGA Excellence in Film Award, and several Lifetime Achievement awards. He has also received nominations from institutions like the Smithsonian Cooper-Hewitt. In 1999 Ferro was awarded the DaimlerChrysler Design Award, and in 2000 he was inducted into the Art Directors Hall of Fame.

Ferro's titles and montage sequences have appeared in 12 Academy Award winning films. He worked on a children's book and a graphic novel. He did the animation on his own documentary, Pablo, which was released in 2012.

Ferro's contributions to the field were recognized with numerous awards, including the 2009 AIGA Medal, that underscores his impact on the industry and his role as a transformative figure in graphic design.

== Legacy ==
Pablo Ferro had a profound influence on the world of graphic design, particularly in the realm of film title design and advertising.

Ferro was a pioneer of techniques like quick-cut editing, split-screen techniques, and multiple screen imagery. His innovative approach to film title sequences brought a new level of dynamism and energy to the screen, influencing generations of designers and filmmakers.

His hand-drawn typography became a signature style, recognized and emulated in both film and graphic design. His work on titles for films like Dr. Strangelove and A Clockwork Orange set a new standard for visual storytelling. Ferro's impactful lettering added a distinctive character that has been a source of inspiration for many in the design community.

Ferro's visceral approach to advertising and film titles inspired his clients to take risks with color, editing, and bold imagery. His work on the NBC peacock logo and the Burlington Mills "stitching" logo are prime examples of his lasting impact on visual culture. By pushing boundaries, Ferro helped to shape the aesthetic preferences and creative daring of the advertising industry.

His collaborations with renowned directors like Stanley Kubrick, Hal Ashby, and Jonathan Demme helped shape the visual language of their films. Ferro's ability to bring a compelling visual style to their projects made him a sought-after designer in Hollywood. His work for Kubrick, especially in Dr. Strangelove and A Clockwork Orange became well-known for its creativity and ingenuity.

== Selected film title sequences ==
- Dr. Strangelove (1964)
- Woman of Straw (1964)
- The Russians Are Coming, the Russians Are Coming (1966)
- Bullitt (1968)
- The Night They Raided Minsky's (1968)
- The Thomas Crown Affair (1968)
- Midnight Cowboy (1969)
- Harold and Maude (1971)
- A Clockwork Orange (1971)
- Bound for Glory (1976)
- Citizens Band (1977)
- Last Embrace (1979)
- Being There (1979)
- Second-Hand Hearts (1981)
- I'm Dancing as Fast as I Can (1982)
- Amityville 3-D (1983)
- Swing Shift (1984)
- Stop Making Sense (1984)
- To Live and Die in L.A. (1985)
- No Way Out (1987)
- No Man's Land (1987)
- Johnny Be Good (1988)
- Beetlejuice (1988)
- Married to the Mob (1988)
- The Rescue (1988)
- Fine Gold (1989)
- Heart Condition (1990)
- The Guardian (1990)
- Maniac Cop 2 (1990)
- Pump Up the Volume (1990)
- Darkman (1990)
- Book of Love (1990)
- Career Opportunities (1991)
- Mobsters (1991)
- The Addams Family (1991)
- Me Myself & I (1992)
- American Heart (1992)
- Malice (1993)
- Addams Family Values (1993)
- Philadelphia (1993)
- F.T.W. (1994)
- Milk Money (1994)
- To Die For (1995)
- Devil in a Blue Dress (1995)
- The Sunchaser (1996)
- Mrs. Winterbourne (1996)
- Hidden in America (1996)
- That Thing You Do! (1996)
- Meet Wally Sparks (1997)
- Anna Karenina (1997)
- L.A. Confidential (1997)
- Men in Black (1997)
- Good Will Hunting (1997)
- Hugo Pool (1997)
- As Good as it Gets (1997)
- Krippendorf's Tribe (1998)
- Hope Floats (1998)
- Dr. Dolittle (1998)
- Dance with Me (1998)
- Beloved (1998)
- Psycho (1998)
- For Love of the Game (1999)
- It's the Rage (1999)
- Agnes Browne (1999)
- Witness Protection (1999)
- Bones (2001)
- My Big Fat Greek Wedding (2002)
- Men in Black II (2002)
- The Truth About Charlie (2002)
- Secretary (2002)
- The Bronze Screen: 100 Years of the Latino Image in Hollywood Cinema (2002)
- Napoleon Dynamite (2004)
- The Manchurian Candidate (2004)
- Tweek City (2005)
- Starter for 10 (2006)
- Cthulhu (2007)
- The Ministers (2009)
- Larry Crowne (2011)
- Men in Black 3 (2012)
- Sins of Our Youth (2014)

== See also ==
- List of AIGA medalists
