= The Bronze Screen: 100 Years of the Latino Image in Hollywood =

The Bronze Screen directed and produced by Susan Racho, and Alberto Dominguez, examines, analyzes, and critiques the portrayal of Latinos in Hollywood over the course of a century. Released in 2002, the documentary traces the different stereotypes evoked by Hollywood throughout the mid 19th and 20th century. This is done through the use of silent films and small excerpts from a variety of movie genres that feature Latinos. Carmen Miranda and Margarita Cansino (popularly known as Rita Hayworth) are a few of the many Latin actors and actresses whose careers, according to film historians, directors, and fellow actors featured in the documentary, were fabricated and highly manipulated by Hollywood. Furthermore, these actresses are used to illustrate the politics behind American Cinema and Latino/a negative representations in Hollywood. In addition to exploring stereotypes and negative representations of Latinos, The Bronze Screen also acknowledges the contribution and emergence of Latino writers, directors, cinematographers, composers, and graphic designers. Luis Valdez, Pablo Ferro, Moctesuma Esparza, and John Alonzo are a few, among the many featured in the documentary, that have paved the way for other Latinos who want to work in the industry, as well as, portrayed Latinos in a more positive manner through their films.

== Structure and content ==
The documentary is divided into twenty-one sections that consist of (1) Hollywood's first bad guy, (2) enter the Latin lover, (3) if you talk like deez, (4) the graveyard shift, (5) escaping the depression, (6) no seas tonto (don't be stupid), (7) some kind of hero, (8) good neighbor policy, (9) the name game, (10) cowboys and Mexicans, (11) the Latin lover returns, (12) the blacklist, (13) border clashes, (14) the Cesar returned, (15) something's coming (16) the sixties, (17) meanwhile behind the camera, (18) the "s" word, (19) the urban greaser, (20) from silver to bronze, and (21) el futuro. A stereotype, actor or actress is examined in each section. The first section begins by looking at silent films and their use of Mexican men as the bad guys and Mexican women as bad girls with loose morals.

In the sections that follow stereotypes such as the greaser, the Latin lover, the tonto (dumb), the bandido (bandit), the lazy Mexican, and the gangster are identified in various Hollywood films. The "if you talk like deez" section focuses on the Latino accent. According to the documentary the introduction of talkies ended the careers of many Latino actors. Latino males went from playing lead roles in silent films to playing supporting roles because of their accent. In "the grave yard shift" Lupita Tovar recalls her experience as an actress working the night shift. She goes on to explain that the Spanish versions of films were shot at night while the English version was shot during the day. Yet another obstacles Latinos have faced in Hollywood. Instead of focusing on stereotypes "the name game" section consist of the obstacles Latino actors and Latina actresses have had to face in regards to their names. The actors and actresses interviewed in this section all said to have experienced a moment in their careers in which their managers or someone in the industry suggested that they changed their name to something more American. They, however, refused to change their names because to them their names form part of their identities as actors and actresses. The last four sections of the documentary which include "something's coming the sixties", "meanwhile behind the camera", "from silver to bronze", and "el futuro" (the future) all examine the positive changes Latinos have made in Hollywood and the changes they continue to push for. Moreover, these last four sections show that Latinos in the film industry have redefined their role in Hollywood by producing, writing, and directing their own films.

== Reception ==
The Library Journal wrote that The Bronze Screen is a fascinating documentary about the Latino in Hollywood from the first roles in the early 1900s to the present; the film could be used as a collection development tool for building a Latino film collection. The reviewer recommends the documentary for all academic and public libraries with Latin American studies and film studies collections. They noted that some of the comprehensive methods used include the filmmakers interviewing 15 actors, including Edward James Olmos and Rita Moreno. The review further explains, ten people that work in production positions behind the scenes are interviewed, including Gregory Nava, director of Selena. The writer goes on to say that the four film scholars interviewed offered insights into the stereotypes and the past and future of Latinos in the American cinema industry.

They wrote that the ethnic stereotypes portrayed in the documentary include the greaser, the lazy Mexican, the dark mysterious lady, the Latin lover, the spitfire, the violent gang leader, and the non-English-speaking cleaning woman. They also write that the film's structure in chapters give the film continuity, featuring a myriad of clips and stills, both familiar and rare, along with exceptional sound and film quality.

The School Library Journal described the film as, "compelling, enlightening, and entertaining." The Bronze Screen relates the contributions made by Latinos to movies, from silent to contemporary films, with examples of the many ways Latinos have been portrayed. They elaborated on the film's format: "The loosely chronological structure allows viewers to compare and contrast the films and those who inhabit and create them". The reviewer emphasizes part of the significance of this film: "No look at the history of Hollywood would be complete without this documentary, which should be widely viewed by anyone interested in the history of movies".

The writer explains that the documentary gives their view of the past and how the images of Latinos in Hollywood have shifted over time. The reviewer further describes the way in which the various stereotypes that have developed and evolved (such as the Latin Lover and the greaser) in American cinema are explored and enhanced with examples throughout the documentary. The reviewer also underlines that other film historians provide cogent commentary throughout.

Journalist Robert Dominguez gives his review of the film in the "Que Pasa" (what's happening) section of the newspaper, the New York Daily News: "As a documentary chronicling a little-known and underappreciated aspect of film history, The Bronze Screen: 100 Years of the Latino Image in Hollywood Cinema is as comprehensive as its title suggests". Occupying the seat as the main highlight of Harlem's 2003 Film Festival, the writer says, "Yet the main appeal of "The Bronze Screen" is what co-producer Nancy De Los Santos jokingly calls its "No s--!" factor—fascinating tidbits of information "that make people go, ‘No s--! I didn’t know that’". The review highlights the scholarship that was done by the film's creators De Los Santos, along with co-producers Alberto Dominguez and Susan Racho, who spent more than 10 years researching and making The Bronze Screen. The writer quotes De Los Santos saying, "The three of us have worked in Hollywood for 25 years, yet we didn’t even know the history of all the wonderful contributions Latinos have made". The review further quotes De Los Santos: "There are a lot of surprises for everybody in this film". These include the fact that it was two Mexican brothers that designed the movable King Kong model in the 1931 film. The writer describes other examples like these from the film, like some of the classic horror films, such as Dracula were filmed in Spanish-language versions on the same set in the middle of the night after the American cast and crew went home. Another example includes the political economics of the early 20th century: "a fed-up Mexican government that boycotted Hollywood films in the 1920s because Mexicans were constantly being portrayed as rapists, killers and outlaws". The review quotes De Los Santos saying, "People think of us as playing maids and gang members and all the other negative images. We wanted to reveal all the positive things we’ve done as a community". De Los Santos further reveals, "What I loved most about doing this is that it's Latinos documenting Latino history".

Journalist Michael Speier reviews the documentary for the newspaper, Variety: "The documentary covers the politics behind early distribution patterns, and the manipulation of actors, among other topics". The reviewer notes that a respectable amount of time is spent highlighting contributions made by multiple job levels and sectors, from composers, d.p.'s, to graphic designers. The writer notes that among the film's chapters, there's "The Graveyard Shift," describing producers’ early inclinations to shoot two separate language versions, "with the Spanish-speaking thesps and crew coming in at night and working until morning". Speier expands that the chapter, "Escaping the Depression," talks of the subtle shift in the dominant portrayal of Latinos: "during the 1930s toward playing Hispanics only as wealthy South Americans who comprise a fantasy world inhabited by "attractive" performers like Del Rio". He goes on to mention the relationship between the Hollywood film industry and the president's administration of foreign policy in the documentary's chapter, "Hollywood's First Bad Guy," where, "President Woodrow Wilson is cheekily cited for helping trade relations by imploring studios to ‘be a little kinder to the Mexicans’ after Latin America banned films that made its people dumb and violent ‘greasers’".

Speier criticizes that the documentary does not spend enough time on the vital periods it covers. Speier adds while, "Ricardo Montalbán," one of the actors interviewed, "refused to be renamed Ricky Martin, yet his views on prejudice—and he must have some—are not fully developed". Speier goes on to say, "Anthony Quinn left for Europe after his Viva Zapata Oscar because he was more "accepted" there, as most Latino thesps are, yet that collective trek is almost completely ignored". Speier also critiques that there are several big names missing from the documentary, including Jennifer Lopez, Andy García and Salma Hayek.

Journalist Bob Graham for the newspaper, the SFGate reviews this documentary, whose screening opened up the 9th Annual Festival Cine Latino in 2001. Graham describes the documentary as, "a history of Latino contribution to American film". The review highlights how several actors talk about how they refused to change their name to something less ethnic, but that there were others who did, for example, Rita Hayworth.

The writer further describes the actress’ transformation: "as one of the most glamorous starts of American movies, Hayworth's heritage—concealed by the studios during her heyday in the 1940s—has since become the subject verging on myth. The review describes how the myth motivated physical changes: "She kept that name for her first 10 movies when, according to the documentary, she was "de-Latinized" and turned into the glamorous figure we remember today. Her name was changed and her hair lightened".

In an interview from 2009 on LatinoLA, De Los Santos was asked what she considered to be her greatest work so far. She responded: "While I do love all the work I have written or produced, I think the contribution of the feature-length documentary is a huge contribution to our history and the Latino legacy in Hollywood. I am very proud of that documentary".

== Awards ==
According to the website, 8 Ways to Say, "The Bronze Screen was nominated for the National Council of La Raza's ALMA Award for ‘Best Documentary’".

== Cast ==
The cast includes Benicio del Toro, Anthony Quinn, Dolores del Río, Pablo Ferro, Pedro Almodóvar, María Conchita Alonso, Alfonso Arau, Desi Arnaz, Rubén Blades, Leo Carrillo, José Ferrer, Mel Ferrer, Gael García Bernal, Rita Hayworth, Raúl Juliá, Katy Jurado, John Leguizamo, Diego Luna, Cheech Marin, Carmen Miranda, Ricardo Montalbán, Esai Morales, Antonio Moreno, Rita Moreno, Gregory Nava, Ramon Navarro, Edward James Olmos, Lupe Ontiveros, Elizabeth Peña, Gilbert Roland, Cesar Romero, Henry Silva, Jimmy Smits, Raquel Torres, Lupita Tovar, Luis Valdez, Lupe Vélez, and Raquel Welch.

== Crew ==
The making of this documentary could not have been possible without the participation and contribution of the many directors, writers, graphic designers, cinematographers, composers, and film scholars interviewed. The crew includes Wanda De Jesus, Nancy De Los Santos, Alberto Dominguez, Susan Racho, José Cancela, Pablo Ferro, Mark Hurwitz, Aida Yohannes, Luca Bentivoglio, Gabriela Gonzalez, Luis Ortiz, and Efrain Osorio.

== See also ==
- Latinos Beyond Reel
