= Movers & Shakers (film) =

1985 film by William Asher

- Directed by: William Asher
- Written by: Charles Grodin
- Produced by: William Asher; Charles Grodin
- Starring: Walter Matthau; Charles Grodin; Vincent Gardenia; Tyne Daly; Bill Macy; Gilda Radner
- Cinematography: Robbie Greenberg
- Edited by: Tom Benko
- Music by: Ken Welch; Mitzie Welch
- Production company: United Artists
- Distributed by: Metro-Goldwyn-Mayer
- Release date: May 3, 1985
- Running time: 80 minutes
- Country: United States
- Language: English
- Budget: $3.5 million
- Box office: $372,438

Movers & Shakers is a 1985 American comedy film distributed by Metro-Goldwyn-Mayer, starring Walter Matthau and directed by William Asher.

The story follows the head of production at a Hollywood studio who wants to make a movie to fulfill a promise made to a dying friend.

The film is written by Charles Grodin, who also appears. The cast also includes Tyne Daly, Gilda Radner and Vincent Gardenia. Steve Martin makes a cameo appearance as Fabio Longio.

== Plot ==
Hollywood studio mogul Joe Mulholland vows to produce the pet project of a dying acquaintance who has been trying to find a way to make a film from a best-selling sex manual. He and screenwriter Herb Derman try to make it happen but fail in every possible way. Meanwhile, Herb is distracted by his own marital problems.

== Cast ==
- Walter Matthau as Joe Mulholland
- Charles Grodin as Herb Derman
- Vincent Gardenia as Saul Gritz
- Tyne Daly as Nancy Derman
- Bill Macy as Sid Spokane
- Gilda Radner as Livia Machado
- Earl Boen as Marshall
- Michael Lerner as Arnie
- Joe Mantell as Larry
- William Prince as Louis Martin
- Nita Talbot as Dorothy
- Judah Katz as Freddie
- Peter Marc Jacobson as Robin
- Sam Anderson as Ray Berg
- Frances Bay as Betty Gritz
- Luana Anders as Violette
- Eugene Dynarski as Board Member
- Philip Sterling as Executive
- Steve Martin as Fabio Longio
- Penny Marshall as Reva

== Production ==
Charles Grodin recounted the making of this film in his autobiography It Would Be So Nice if You Weren't Here: In the mid-1970s, Paramount Pictures paid a large amount of money to secure the rights to Alex Comfort's sex manual The Joy of Sex just so it could use the title, which studio executives thought to be highly commercial. In 1978, they hired Grodin to write a script, telling him that the movie "could be about anything". Grodin decided to use this exact situation as the premise: a Hollywood writer struggles to write a script based on a sex manual after a big studio acquires the rights. When he finished his first draft, the studio passed and eventually released National Lampoon's Joy of Sex in 1984.

After Paramount put Grodin's script in turnaround in 1978, he was free to offer it to other studios. However, because Paramount held the rights to the title The Joy of Sex, the film was retitled Dreamers. Columbia Pictures showed interest in producing it with Peter Falk playing the lead role as the producer. But when the deal with Columbia fell through, Grodin pitched his screenplay to every Hollywood studio several times during the next seven years. Eventually, director William Asher agreed to make it with a budget of two million dollars if the actors and crew would defer salaries. As a result, Grodin and Asher share a producers credit on the finished film.

Grodin persuaded some of his actor friends to become involved. Steve Martin, Gilda Radner, Penny Marshall, Tyne Daly and Grodin all agreed to work for the least amount of money that the union allowed. Martin agreed without reading the script. When the film was finally greenlit, Grodin received no salary for writing or producing it; only the minimum for working five weeks as an actor: about $5,000 for two years of work (seven years total since the inception of the project).

When the film was ready to go in front of the cameras, original lead actor Peter Falk was no longer available. An unnamed well-known comic actor had to drop out when he did not pass his insurance physical. At the last minute, Walter Matthau agreed to star, receiving $1 million, half his usual fee for his work at the time.

Following some unsuccessful preview screenings, the son of MGM executive Greg Morrison suggested that narration by Grodin be added to the picture.

MGM initially refused to pay for the picture nor release it, because "it was not of first-class technical quality" and "does not reflect the screenplay". The film finally got a limited release in several large cities across America. However, because of its relatively small budget ($3.5 million) and all-star cast, MGM expected to make money on home video, cable television, regular television and foreign sales.

Grodin was extremely unhappy with MGM due to their distribution of the picture, and harshly criticized the studio during talk show appearances. Years later, on a depression-themed episode of his CNBC talk show, Grodin cited the failure of this film (along with the death of his father) as the cause of a long period of depression.

== See also ==
- "Ode," a poem by Arthur O'Shaughnessy credited with popularizing the phrase "movers & shakers".
