= Rodman Philbrick =

American novelist (born 1951)

- Born: Rodman Philbrick; January 22, 1951 (age 75); Boston, Massachusetts, U.S.
- Spouse: Lynn Harnett (m. 1980; died 2012)

Rodman Philbrick (born January 22, 1951) is an American writer of novels for adults and children. He has written popular children's books such as Freak the Mighty, Max the Mighty, The Last Book in the Universe, and has written other mysteries and thrillers for adults.

== Early life ==
He was born in Boston, Massachusetts, and currently lives in both Maine and Florida. He attended Portsmouth High School and he also attended University of New Hampshire for a few semesters.

== Career ==
Rodman Philbrick has written many mysteries and thrillers for adults, including Brothers & Sinners, Coffins, and the T. D. Stash detective series, set in Key West, Florida, as well as a number of mysteries under the pen name William R. Dantz. Writing as Chris Jordan, Philbrick has published novels in the thriller genre: Taken, Trapped, and Torn, featuring former FBI special agent Randall Shane, who investigates the disappearance of missing children.

Two of his most popular children's books are Freak the Mighty and its sequel, Max the Mighty. Freak the Mighty was later adapted into a movie titled The Mighty. He wrote the cyberpunk, dystopian novel The Last Book in the Universe and the science fantasy novel REM World. His other published works for young readers include The Young Man and the Sea, which is dedicated to his nieces Annie and Molly, and The Fire Pony, about two brothers on the run in the American West. The Mostly True Adventures of Homer P. Figg, set in the American Civil War, was named a Newbery Honor Book in 2010. A stage version of The Mostly True Adventures of Homer P. Figg debuted at the Kennedy Center in Washington, D.C., in 2012. He and Lynn Harnett collaborated on scary books for young readers, including The House on Cherry Street, The Werewolf Chronicles, and Visitors, three trilogies published by Scholastic, Inc.

In December 2011, writing as Chris Jordan, Philbrick published Measure of Darkness, set in Boston. According to the author, Randall Shane enters the story in the first chapter, when he is accused of murdering a client. Zane and The Hurricane: A Story of Katrina, an adventure set in New Orleans, was published in February 2014. The Big Dark was released in print and audio versions in January 2016. A mystery for young readers, Who Killed Darius Drake? was published in 2017. Wildfire, a thrilling survival tale, was published in 2019. We Own the Sky, the story of an immigrant flying circus, set in Maine in 1924, was published in September 2022.

Philbrick has also written using the pen names W. R. Philbrick, William R. Dantz, and Chris Jordan.

== Personal life ==
Philbrick and Lynn Harnett were married from 1980 until her death, in 2012. Before Philbrick began writing full-time, he worked as a longshoreman and boat builder.

== Awards ==
Awards and nominations listed by Philbrick
Award	notes
Shamus Award, Best P. I. Novel, Paperback Original	1993
Judy Lopez Honor Book	1994
California Young Reader Medal	Winner 1995
Arizona Young Readers	Medal Winner 1996
Nebraska Golden Sower Award	1997
ALA Best Books	for Young Adults
ALA Recommended Books	for Reluctant Readers
Wyoming Soaring Eagle Book Award	1998
New York Charlotte's Web Award	1998 Maryland Middle School Book Award 1998
Maine Lupine Honor	2000
Maryland Middle School Book Award	2001
Keystone State Book Award	2002
Isinglass Teen Read Award	2002
Maine Lupine Award	2009
Newbery Honor	2010
Maine Lupine Award	2014
Texas Bluebonnet List	2015-2016
Maine Lupine Honor	2017

Maine Katahdin Award 2020

South Carolina Junior Book Award 2021-2022 'Wildfire'

'Wildfire', William Allen White Award 2022 (Kansas)

'We Own the Sky' New-York Historical Society Best Children's Book 2023

'We Own the Sky' Bronze Medal Florida Book Award 2022

== Bibliography ==
=== Freak The Mighty ===
- Freak the Mighty
- Max the Mighty

=== Other works ===
- The Last Book in the Universe
- The Young Man and the Sea
- The Fire Pony
- Lobster Boy (UK title for The Young Man and the Sea)
- Rem World
- Visitors (Novel Series) (With Lynn Harnett, 1997)
- The Mostly True Adventures of Homer P. Figg (Newbery Honor Book, 2010)
- The Journal of Douglas Allen Deeds: The Donner Party Expedition 1846
- Zane and the Hurricane (2014)
- The Big Dark (2016)
- Who Killed Darius Drake? (2017)
- Wildfire (2019)
- Wild River (2021)

=== Books by alias Chris Jordan ===
- Taken (2007)
- Trapped (2007)
- Torn' (2009), (NL: 'Verscheurd')
- Measure of Darkness (2011), (NL: 'In duisternis gehuld')

== Other sources ==
- ALAN Review, winter, 1999; winter, 2001, Rodman Philbrick, "Listening to Kids in America," pp. 13–16.
- Booklist, December 15, 1993, Stephanie Zvirin, review of
- Freak the Mighty, p. 748;
- June 1, 1998, Susan Dove Lempke, review of Max the Mighty, pp. 1749–1750;
- December 15, 1998, Ilene Cooper, review of Freak the Mighty, p. 751;
- May 1, 2000, review of REM World: Where Nothing Is Real and Everything Is about to Disappear, p. 1670;
- November 15, 2000, Debbie Carton, review of The Last Book in the Universe, p. 636;
- August, 2001, Anna Rich, review of The Last Book in the Universe, p. 2142;
- January 1, 2002, Kay Weisman, review of The Journal of Douglas Alan Deeds: The Donner Party Expedition, p. 859;
- March 15, 2005, Patricia Austin, review of The Young Man and the Sea, p. 1313.
- Bulletin of the Center for Children's Books, January, 1994
- Deborah Stevenson, review of Freak the Mighty, p. 165
- July–August, 1996, p. 383
- April, 1998, Deborah Stevenson, review of Max the Mighty, p. 291
- March, 2004, Elizabeth Bush, review of The Young Man and the Sea, p. 291.
- Childhood Education, winter, 2000, Barbara F. Backer, review of REM World, p. 109.
- Horn Book, January–February, 1994, Nancy Vasilakis, review of Freak the Mighty, p. 74
- July–August, 1996, Martha V. Parravano, review of The Fire Pony, p. 464
- July–August, 1998, Nancy Vasilakis, review of Max the Mighty, p. 495. review of Freak the Mighty, p. 165
- March–April, 2004, Peter D. Sieruta, review of The Young Man and the Sea, p. 187.
- Journal of Adolescent and Adult Literacy, March, 2004, James Blasingame, interview with Philbrick, p. 518.
- Kirkus Reviews, February 15, 1998, review of Max the Mighty, p. 272
- January 15, 2004, review of The Young Man and the Sea, p. 87.
- Kliatt, March, 1999, review of Abduction, p. 26
- May, 2002, Paula Rohrlick, review of The Last Book in the Universe, p. 29
- January, 2004, Claire Rosser, review of The Young Man and the Sea, p. 12.
- New Yorker, December 13, 1993, pp. 115–116.
- Publishers Weekly, January 26, 1998, review of Max the Mighty, p. 91
- March 27, 2000, review of REM World, p. 81
- November 27, 2000, review of The Last Book in the Universe, p. 77
- January 14, 2002, review of Coffins, p. 46
- February 16, 2004, review of The Young Man and the Sea, p. 173.
- School Library Journal, December, 1993, Libby K. White, review of Freak the Mighty, p. 137
- September, 1996, Christina Linz, review of The Fire Pony, p. 206
- April, 1998, Marilyn Payne Phillips, review of Max the Mighty, p. 136
- July, 1998, Brian E. Wilson, review of Freak the Mighty, p. 56
- May, 2000, Nina Lindsay, review of REM World, p. 175
- November, 2000, Susan L. Rogers, review of The Last Book in the Universe, p. 160
- July, 2001, Louise L. Sherman, review of The Last Book in the Universe, p. 60
- December, 2001, Lana Miles, review of The Journal of Douglas Allen Deeds, p. 142
- February, 2004, Jeffrey Hastings, review of The Young Man and the Sea, p. 152
- October, 2004, review of The Young Man and the Sea, p. 54
- April, 2005, Larry Cooperman, review of The Young Man and the Sea, p. 76.
- Voice of Youth Advocates, April, 1994, p. 30; October, 1996, p. 212; June, 1998, p. 124.

https://rodmanphilbrick.com/
