= Freak the Mighty =

Novel by Rodman Philbrick

- First edition
- Author: Rodman Philbrick
- Cover artist: David Shannon
- Genre: Young adult fiction
- Publisher: Blue Sky/Scholastic
- Publication date: 1993
- Publication place: United States
- Pages: 160
- Award: Newberry Medal
- ISBN: 0-7857-6594-8
- Followed by: Max the Mighty

Freak the Mighty is a young adult novel by Rodman Philbrick. Published in 1993, it was followed by the novel Max the Mighty in 1998. The primary characters are friends Maxwell Kane, a large, learning disabled, and kind-hearted boy, and Kevin Avery, nicknamed "Freak", who is physically disabled and very intelligent. Kevin has Morquio syndrome.

The novel was adapted for the screen under the title The Mighty by Charles Leavitt; the film was shot in Toronto, Ontario, Canada and Cincinnati, Ohio, and directed by Peter Chelsom, and released in 1998.

== Plot ==
In Portsmouth, New Hampshire, Maxwell Kane is a young boy who lives with his grandparents, Grim and Gram. People are afraid of Max because he looks like his father, convicted murderer Kenneth "Killer" Kane. Max reminisces about his time in daycare, when he met a boy named Kevin (or Freak, as their classmates called him). Kevin has Morquio syndrome, wears leg braces and uses crutches, thinks of himself as a robot, and is bullied by bigger kids due to his short height.

Years later, when Max is in middle school, he learns that Freak and his mother, Gwen, referred to as "The Fair Guinevere", are moving into the house next door. Max eventually approaches Freak, who acts with hostility. Max later saves Kevin's toy ornithopter from a tree and they start to form a friendship. On the Fourth of July, they go to see the fireworks show and are attacked by an older boy, Tony "Blade" D., and his gang. After the show, Blade chases the two with his gang after Freak calls him a cretin. Despite Max's lack of knowledge and disability, he escapes by acting on Freak's orders, but the two are driven into a muddy millpond, Freak riding on Max's shoulders. Freak gets the attention of a nearby police car, which drives off Blade's gang and takes the boys home. After this, Kevin starts riding on Max's shoulders regularly. They begin to call themselves "Freak the Mighty". They go on adventures such as going to the hospital which Freak claims has a secret "Bionics Department" which has had his brain CT scanned and fitted into a bionic body.

On one adventure they find a woman's purse in the storm drain. They return it to the woman who is named Loretta Lee. She is married to Iggy, leader of the Panheads, a motorcycle gang who "struck fear in everyone, even the cops". Iggy says that the two of them once knew Max's father. They consider "having some fun" with the boys but do not because they are afraid that Max's father will get parole even though he is serving a life sentence. Loretta also calls Kevin's father a magician, saying that he vanished as soon as he found out his son had a birth defect.

At school, Freak chokes on food and is taken to the hospital. Later, Grim reveals to Max that his father, Kenny Kane, has been released from prison on parole. Max's father killed his mother, Annie, by strangling her to death. Grim and Gram dislike Kane and are afraid of Max ending up like him. Grim threatens to buy a gun for the family's protection. Max is shocked and scared by the news of Kane's parole. On Christmas Eve, Max is woken up by Kane, who wants to train him to be his assistant and kidnaps him. They go to Iggy Lee's apartment in the New Tenements, nicknamed the "New Testaments" by the people in Portmouth.

Kane keeps Max tied up on a small chair. Kane swears that he did not murder Annie and calls himself "a man of God". On Christmas morning he leaves Max alone and Loretta tries to help him escape. Kane catches Loretta and starts to choke her to death but is interrupted by Max escaping the ropes to save her. Max reveals that he witnessed his father kill Annie in the same fashion. Kane tries to grab Max's neck and strangle him. Freak then arrives and saves Max by squirting Kane with a squirt gun in the eye which he claims is filled with sulfuric acid, though it is in fact filled with soap, vinegar, and curry powder. The police await outside, and Kane is taken back to prison and, having pled guilty in court, has to serve out the rest of his original sentence plus ten more years.

After having a seizure on his thirteenth birthday, Freak is admitted into the hospital and gives Max a blank book, telling him to write the story of Freak the Mighty in it. Max returns to the hospital the next day to find that Freak died because his heart became too big for his body. Dr. Spivak, Kevin's doctor, reveals that Freak knew he was going to have a short life, but he told Max that he was going to get a bionic body because it would give himself hope. The Fair Gwen moves away, with a new man named Rick she is in love with, and Max misses Freak's funeral, staying in his room (which he calls the "down under") for months. Not even Grim or Gram can get him out, until Grim orders Max to return to school. One day, Max sees Loretta, who says that "Doing nothing's a drag, kid", so Max writes all of the adventures he and Freak had, in honor of his best friend.

== Characters ==
- Maxwell "Max" Kane is the main protagonist and narrator of the story. He is described to be very big and have a striking resemblance to his father, Kenneth "Killer" Kane. In daycare, Max earned the nickname "Kicker" because he had a thing of booting and kicking anyone who dared to touch him, when he was a child. Max lives with his grandparents, Grim and Gram, and usually stays in "the down under", a small room in the basement. He hates his father, whom he witnessed killing his mother, Annie. He becomes best friends with Freak, who customarily rides on his shoulders and acts as Max's surrogate "brain" while Max acts as Freak's legs. Max becomes depressed after Freak dies, locking himself in the down under for days until Grim told him to go back to school. He is also very insecure about himself. He usually calls himself a "butthead", has low self-esteem, and is never confident. Max has dyslexia and is unable to read or write until Freak came along.
- Kevin "Freak" Avery is a disabled, blonde-haired boy whom Max becomes best friends with. Kevin has Morquio syndrome, where the outside of his body cannot grow. He walks on crutches and wears a leg brace. He is a genius for his age and size and is cuttingly sarcastic. He carries a dictionary with him. He is interested in robotics and the tales of King Arthur, to the extent of calling his mother Gwen "The Fair Gwen Of Air/Guinevere" and calling his adventures with Max "quests". Kevin looks forward to his surgery (which Max later finds out was a lie so he wouldn't know the truth), in which he will gain a robot's body. Unexpectedly on his 13th birthday, Kevin has a seizure. In the hospital, he dies, because as his doctor puts it, "his heart became too big for his body." In the film, Kevin's last name was changed from Avery to Dillon.
- Grim is Maxwell's grandfather. His behavior is at first described as quite grim - thus explaining why Maxwell gave him the nickname - though he shows himself to be a kind and friendly person. However, he is extremely hostile towards Max's father due to the murder of his daughter, Annie. In the book, after Grim hears about Killer Kane's parole, he threatens to shoot Killer Kane with a gun if he sets foot in the house. At first, Grim feels sorry for Kevin, but later, he appreciates Kevin's abilities and intelligence.
- Gram is Maxwell's grandmother. Like her husband, she also dislikes Kenneth and misses her daughter, Annie. Gram is quite kind and polite, careful not to hurt anyone's feelings. She protests against shooting Kenneth once Grim announces that he will do so.
- Gwen "Fair Gwen" Avery is Kevin's mother. Kevin nicknames her "Fair Gwen" after King Arthur's beautiful wife, Fair Guinevere. She and Maxwell's mother were friends until Kenneth Kane came along and killed her. After her son's death, Gwen moves to California and starts a relationship with a man named Rick.
- Kenneth "Kenny" David Kane (also known as Killer Kane) is the main antagonist of the book. He is Max's selfish and sociopathic father. He was sent to prison for strangling his wife to death. After his release from prison on parole, Kenny kidnaps Maxwell on Christmas Eve and takes him to Loretta and Iggy's apartment. Loretta Lee tries to save Max but ends up getting strangled by Kenneth, though she survives. Eventually, Kevin rescues Max by spraying a mixture of soap, vinegar and curry powder in Kenny's eyes, which he claims is sulfuric acid. In the end, Kenny is jailed and has to serve out the rest of his original sentence plus ten years. In the film, he is sentenced to life in prison with no possibility of parole.
- Loretta Lee is a thin, red-haired lady whose stolen purse is recovered by Freak and Max. She is married to the leader of a motorcycle gang named The Panheads, Iggy. Loretta is an alcoholic and a smoker and lives in the "poor" part of the town, the New Tenements. When she attempts to help Max escape, she is almost strangled to death by Kenny Kane, who cracks a bone in her neck, but she turned out okay.
- Iggy Lee is an alcoholic, like Loretta, and lives with her in the Tenements. He is the boss of The Panheads, a motorcycle gang. It is suggested that he may have vertigo, as he states it makes him nervous looking up. He was also a friend of Maxwell's dad (Killer Kane), who makes him scared and nervous. He attempts to help rescue Max when he was kidnapped by his father. He is the husband of Loretta Lee.
- Dr. Spivak is Kevin's doctor. She tells Max about Kevin's death and that the real cause of his death was his heart growing too big for his body.
- Annie Kane is Maxwell's mother but does not appear in the book. She was brutally murdered by her husband, Kenneth Kane.
- Tony D. is a juvenile delinquent who first encountered Max and Freak during the Fourth of July drunkenly asking them for M-80 fireworks. He along with his gang tried to harm Max and Freak with a knife. His gang steals Loretta Lee's purse. He later tells Max he's sorry about Kevin (Freak), who died after having a seizure, though Max doesn't like it and wants to be enemies with him. He is also known as "Blade".
- Rick is a minor character who does not appear in this book. After Kevin Avery dies, he starts a relationship with Gwen Avery in California.
- Mr. Meehan is Maxwell's reading skills tutor.
- Mrs. Donelli is Maxwell's new English teacher.
- Mrs. Addison is the school's principal.
