= Pablo (film) =

- Film poster
- Directed by: Richard Goldgewicht
- Narrated by: Jeff Bridges
- Release date: September 28, 2012 (Rio de Janeiro)
- Country: United States
- Language: English

Pablo is a 2012 American documentary film about Cuban-American graphic designer Pablo Ferro. It was directed by Richard Goldgewicht and narrated by Jeff Bridges.

== Participants ==
The following people appeared in the documentary:

- George Segal
- Beau Bridges
- Jon Voight
- Andy Garcia
- Anjelica Huston
- Leonard Maltin
- Stan Lee
- Richard Benjamin

== Release ==
The film premiered at the Rotterdam Film Festival in 2012, and opened the Los Angeles Latino film festival the same year. It played the Rio de Janeiro International Film Festival on September 28, 2012. It was then released on Netflix and VOD on October 1, 2013 and DVD on November 5, 2013.
