= Maria von Heland =

Swedish screenwriter, director and author

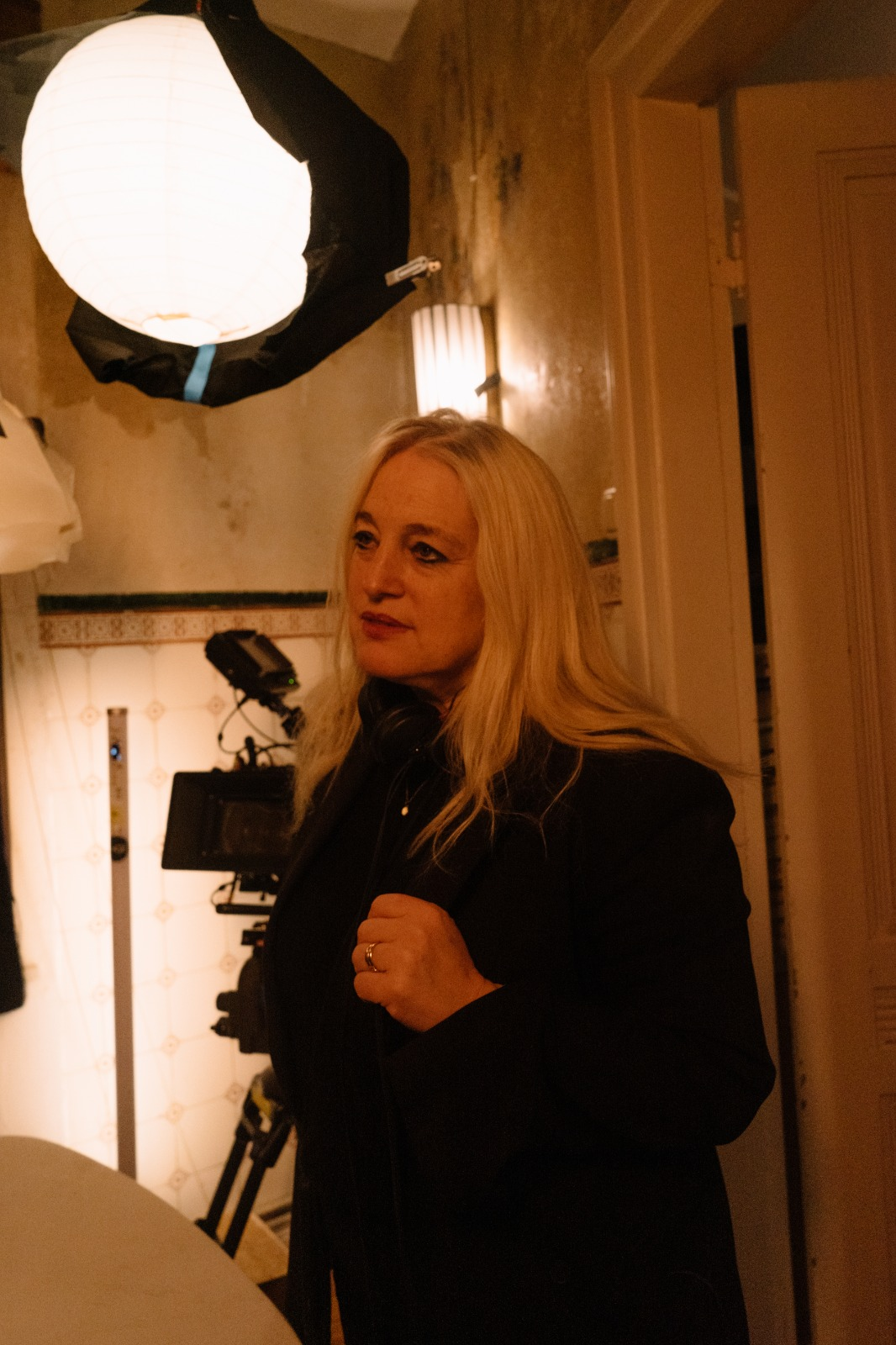
- Maria von Heland on set in Hamburg, 2022
- Born: 25 May 1965 (age 61); Stockholm, Sweden
- Citizenship: Swedish
- Education: California Institute of the Arts
- Occupations: Screenwriter; director
- Years active: 1997–present
- Spouse: Johnny West (m. 2019)
- Children: 4

Maria von Heland (born 25 May 1965) is a Swedish film director and screenwriter. She works in English, German, Swedish and French and is based in Berlin, Germany.

== Early life ==
Maria von Heland (born 25 May 1965 in Stockholm, Sweden) gained a Bachelor of Arts in journalism at Rider University in Lawrenceville, New Jersey after finishing high school in Sweden. From 1990 to 1995 she gained a Master of Fine Arts in directing at the California Institute of the Arts, where she studied under Alexander Mackendrick, and at the School of Film and Video in Los Angeles. During this time she was an exchange student at the Konrad Wolf Akademie for Film and Television in Potsdam-Babelsberg, Germany.

== Career ==
Since 1997 von Heland has directed or produced over 20 films, TV dramas and series. She has won 11 industry awards, including the Series Mania International Panorama award 2022 for the upcoming Netflix series Sunshine Eyes, and has been nominated three times for the International Emmys.

From 2010 to 2018 she directed the annual European Film Awards, and is a member of the European Film Academy.

== Filmography ==
Year	Title	Credited as		Notes	Ref.
Year	Title	Writer	Director	Notes	Ref.
1997	Chainsmoker	Yes	Yes		
1998	Real Men Eat Meat	Yes	No		
1999	Recycled	Yes	Yes		
2000	England!	Yes	No		
2002	Big Girls Don't Cry	Yes	Yes		
2004	Orka! Orka!	No	Yes		
2006	Sök	Yes	Yes	(Swedish)	
2006	Den som viskar	Yes	Yes	(Swedish)	
2007	Suddenly Gina	No	Yes	(German)	
2009	Hilde	Yes	No	Biopic of the German singer and actress Hildegard Knef	
2011	Die Sterntaler	No	Yes		
2013	Der Teufel mit den drei goldenen Haaren	No	Yes	(German)	
2014	Divine Sparks	No	Yes		
2014	Hector and the Search for Happiness	Yes	No		
2017	Eltern und andere Wahrheiten	Yes	Yes		
2018	Solo für Weiss – Für immer Schweigen	No	Yes	(German)	
2018	Jung, blond, tot – Julia Durant ermittelt	No	Yes	(German)	
2019	It's Not That Easy to Die	Yes	Yes	(German)	
2020	Solo für Weiss – Schlaflos	Yes	Yes	(German)	
2020	Heirs of the Night	Yes	No		
2021	Nord Nord Mord – Sievers und der Schönste Tag	No	Yes	(German)	
2022	Kolleginnen für immer	No	Yes	(German)	
2023	Sunshine Eyes	Yes	Yes	10-part series on Netflix	
