= Peter Chelsom =

British film director, writer, and actor

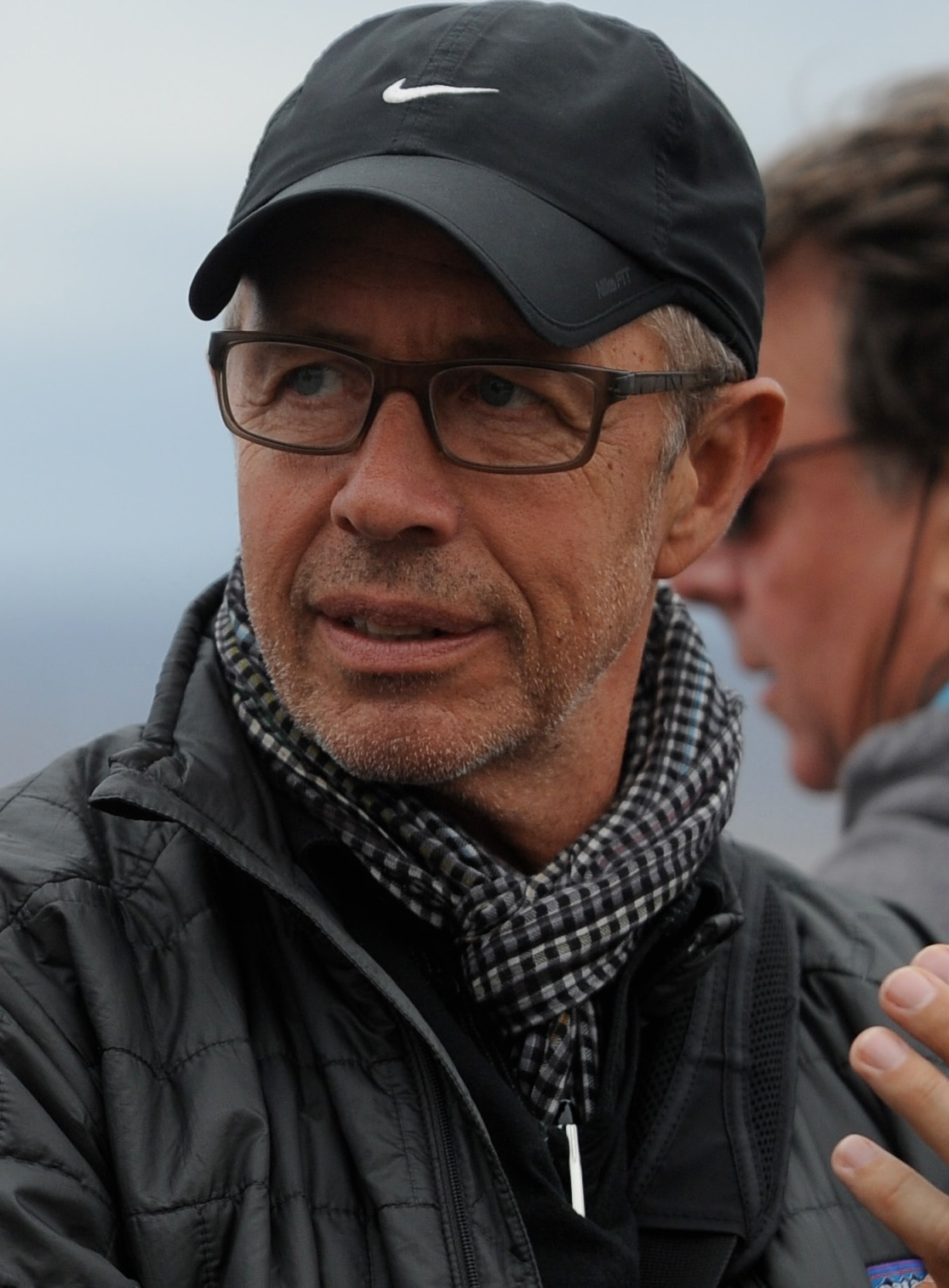
- Chelsom on set of The Space Between Us, summer 2015
- Born: 20 April 1956 (age 70); Blackpool, Lancashire, England
- Education: Royal Central School of Speech and Drama
- Occupations: Film director, actor
- Years active: 1979–present
- Spouse: Lindsay McCracken
- Children: 3
- Website: www.peterchelsom.net

Peter Chelsom (born 20 April 1956) is a British film director, writer, and actor. He has directed such films as Hector and the Search for Happiness, Serendipity, and Shall We Dance? Peter Chelsom is a member of the British Academy, the American Academy, The Directors Guild of America, and The Writers Guild of America.

== Early life ==
Chelsom was born in Blackpool, Lancashire, the son of antiques shop owners Kay and Reginald Chelsom. He was educated at Wrekin College (1969–1973) and later studied at the Central School of Drama in London. He has dual citizenship in the US and the UK, and is an Honorary Citizen of the small town Fivizzano in Tuscany.

== Career ==
Before the age of 30, Chelsom played roles at the Royal Shakespeare Company opposite Patrick Stewart, the Royal National Theatre alongside Sir Anthony Hopkins, and the Royal Court Theatre in London. During that time he took part in numerous film and television productions, including A Woman of Substance in 1985, which also included Jenny Seagrove and Deborah Kerr.

While acting, Chelsom developed a growing interest in writing and directing. His directorial debut, Treacle, won a BAFTA nomination and invitations to festivals all over the world.

From 1985 to 1998 he ran the film course at the Central School of Drama and later taught at both the Actors' Institute and Cornell University.

His first full-length feature was the 1991 romantic comedy, Hear My Song. The film was inspired by the life of the Irish tenor, Josef Locke, played in the film by Ned Beatty. The Evening Standard British Film Awards named Chelsom Best Newcomer for his work on the film. Roger Ebert complimented it as "the very soul of a great small film."

Chelsom's second feature, Funny Bones (1995), is a film about comedy. Starring Oliver Platt, Jerry Lewis, Leslie Caron, Freddie Davies, and Lee Evans, it tells the story of two half brothers, one American and the other British, who will stop at nothing to get a laugh... even murder. Funny Bones won Best Picture at five European film festivals, and the "Peter Sellers Award for Comedy" at the Evening Standard British Film Awards.

His third feature, The Mighty (1998), was based on the best-selling book Freak the Mighty. The film stars Sharon Stone, Gillian Anderson, Gena Rowlands, and Harry Dean Stanton. It received two Golden Globe Nominations. He followed this with Town and Country in 2001, starring Warren Beatty, Diane Keaton, Goldie Hawn, and Garry Shandling. That same year he directed Serendipity, with John Cusack and Kate Beckinsale, which grossed $50 million.

His next film in 2004 was a remake of the 1996 film, Shall We Dance? The American version starred Richard Gere, Jennifer Lopez, Susan Sarandon, and Stanley Tucci. The film grossed $170 million worldwide.

In 2009, Chelsom directed Hannah Montana: The Movie for Disney. The film broke box office records when it opened in the US to a figure of $32 million on its first weekend.

In 2014, Chelsom directed Hector and the Search for Happiness, starring Simon Pegg, Rosamund Pike, Christopher Plummer, Toni Collette, Stellan Skarsgard, and Jean Reno. The film had its US Premiere in a special presentation at the 2014 Toronto International Film Festival. It tells the story of a disillusioned psychiatrist travelling the world, researching what makes people happy. Monte Carlo Film Festival named Chelsom Best Director for this film.

Chelsom directed the science fiction romance The Space Between Us (2017), starring Gary Oldman, Asa Butterfield, Britt Robertson, and Carla Gugino.

== Selected filmography ==
=== Director ===
Short film

Year	Title	Director	Writer
1987	Treacle	Yes	Yes

Feature film

Year	Title	Director	Writer
1991	Hear My Song	Yes	Yes
1995	Funny Bones	Yes	Yes
1998	The Mighty	Yes	No
2001	Town & Country	Yes	No
2001	Serendipity	Yes	No
2004	Shall We Dance?	Yes	No
2009	Hannah Montana: The Movie	Yes	No
2014	Hector and the Search for Happiness	Yes	Yes
2017	The Space Between Us	Yes	No
2021	Security	Yes	Yes
2024	A Sudden Case of Christmas	Yes	Yes

=== Actor ===
- Sorrell and Son (TV Series, 1984) as Kit Sorrell (young adult)
- Weekend Playhouse (TV Series, 1984) as Kenny
- A Woman of Substance (TV Mini-Series, 1985) as Edwin Fairley
- Bill the Minder (TV Series, 1985) as The Narrator
- Christmas Present (TV Movie, 1985) as Nigel Playfayre
- Time and the Conways (TV Movie, 1985) as Alan Conway
- Star Quality (TV Movie, 1985) as Bryan Snow
- Indian Summer (1987) as Oliver Sutherland
- Theatre Night (TV Series, 1988) episode "The Miser" as Cleante

== Awards ==
- Treacle (1988)
  - 1988 BAFTA Awards – Nominated Best Short Film
- Hear My Song (1991)
  - 1992 Golden Globes – Nominated Best Supporting Actor for Ned Beatty
  - 1993 BAFTA Awards – Nominated Best Screenplay – Original, shared with Adrian Dunbar
  - 1993 Evening Standard British Film Awards – Won, Most Promising Newcomer
  - 1993 London Critics Circle Film Awards – Won, ALFS Award British Newcomer of the Year
  - 1993 British Comedy Awards – Won, Best Film
- Funny Bones (1995)
  - 1995 Paris Film Festival – Won, Grand Prix
  - 1995 Dinard British Film Festival – Won, Golden Hitchcock
  - 1995 Emden International Film Festival – Won, Emden Film Award
  - 1996 Brussels International Film Festival – Won, Audience Award and Crystal Star for Best European Feature
  - 1996 Evening Standard British Film Awards – Won, Peter Sellers Award for Comedy
  - 1996 London Critics Circle Film Awards – Won, ALFS Award British Producer of the Year Shared With: Simon Fields
- The Mighty (1998)
  - 1999 Golden Globes – Nominated Best Supporting Actress for Sharon Stone and Nominated Best Original Song for "The Mighty" by Sting and Trevor Jones
  - 1998 Giffoni Film Festival – Won, Silver Gryphon and Young People's Jury Award
- Hector and the Search for Happiness (2014)
  - 2015 Monte-Carlo Comedy Film Festival – Won Best Director
