= Reinout Oerlemans =

Dutch film director

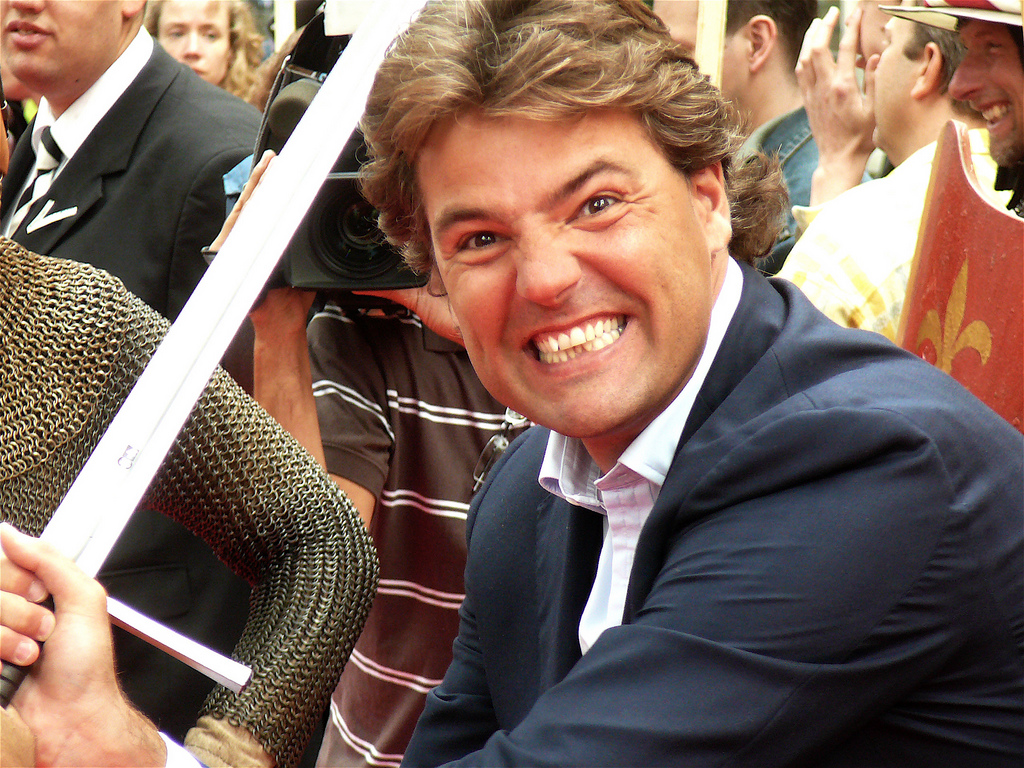
- Oerlemans in 2008
- Born: 10 June 1971 (age 55); Mill, Netherlands
- Education: University of Amsterdam
- Occupations: Actor; film director; television presenter; television producer; entrepreneur
- Spouse: Daniëlle Overgaag
- Children: 4 (2 sons, 2 daughters)
- Website: www.3ballentertainment.com

Reinout Oerlemans (Dutch pronunciation: [ˈrɛinʌut ˈuːrləmɑns]; born 10 June 1971) is a Dutch soap opera actor, film director, television presenter and television producer. He is the founder of the TV production company Eyeworks.

In 1989, while studying law at the University of Amsterdam, Oerlemans was "plucked off the street" and cast as a lead in the first Dutch daily, prime time drama Goede tijden, slechte tijden. After six years with the series, he became one of the most successful TV personalities in the Netherlands, hosting a variety of entertainment shows including the first two seasons of Idols in the Netherlands. He also hosted the hit series Strictly Come Dancing, as well as many seasons of his own talk show, Pulse, for the largest commercial network RTL Television.

In 2001, Oerlemans founded his own production company, Eyeworks. Eyeworks grew to encompass 16 companies across continental Europe, Scandinavia, South America, New Zealand, Australia and the United States — making it one of the top five largest independent production companies in the world. In 2014 Time Warner Eyeworks for a reported 200 million euros.

He has been active in the entertainment industry for 24 years in a variety of roles, starting out as an actor. Currently, he is the chairman of television production company 3Ball Entertainment (formerly called Eyeworks USA), based in Los Angeles. This company was part of the Eyeworks Group until February 2014, when the Group was sold to Warner Bros. At the time of the sale, Eyeworks Group had produced television programs in 16 countries for over 100 different channels and employed over 1,500 people. 3 Ball Entertainment is one of the largest reality producers in the USA. Its credits include the hit series Extreme Weight Loss (the show also airs as Obese in 150 countries worldwide) and Bar Rescue, (100 episodes for Spike) among many other programs.

== Career ==
=== Television ===
While studying law at the University of Amsterdam in 1989, Oerlemans was cast as the leading actor in the Dutch soap Goede tijden, slechte tijden. After six years of acting he quit to become a television host. He presented a wide variety of entertainment shows including the first season of American Idol, which achieved the highest ratings on a commercial channel ever. His later work includes the presentation of Strictly Come Dancing and his own talk show Pulse.

In 2001, Oerlemans founded his own production company, Eyeworks, with partners Robert van den Bogaard and Ronald van Wechem. He became one of the industry's most successful producers and directors of global unscripted and scripted content. Titles produced by the Eyeworks Group include: Test The Nation, CQC, Who Wants to Marry my Son?, Beat The Blondes, Reality Queens of the Jungle, I Know What You Did Last Friday, Obese (aka Extreme Makeover: Weight Loss Edition), and Celebrity Splash.

In 2004, Oerlemans won the Zilveren Televizierster, a national prize for the male television personality of the year. In September 2005, Oerlemans moved from the commercial broadcasting company RTL, where he had worked for fifteen years, to the public broadcasting association TROS, to present the TROS TV Show for a short while, replacing Ivo Niehe. In December 2006, Niehe took over again.

=== Film ===
In 2009, Oerlemans made his debut as a feature film director with Academy Award winning producer Hans de Weers, delivering the highest-grossing Dutch movie of the decade, Stricken (Komt Een Vrouw Bij De Dokter, starring Carice Van Houten). In 2011 he brought the Dutch 3D movie to theatres: Nova Zembla (starring supermodel Doutzen Kroes in her first on screen appearance), which sold close to a million tickets in the Benelux.

His love for drama turned him into a producer in the scripted space — producing numerous feature films, including: The Dinner (with director Menno Meyjes, writer of The Color Purple and Indiana Jones and the Last Crusade), New Kids Turbo (over 1.5 million tickets sold in the Netherlands, Germany and Belgium), and Jackie (featuring Oscar-winning actress Holly Hunter).

== Personal life ==
Oerlemans is married to Daniëlle Overgaag, and together they have four children.

== Selected filmography ==
Film
Year	Role	Notes
2011	Nova Zembla	Producer / director
2009	Stricken	Producer / director

- Gift from the Heart – Producer 2014
- Wonderbroeders – Producer 2014
- The Dinner – Producer 2013
- Bro's Before Ho's – Producer 2013
- Daylight – Producer 2013
- Man in Pak (Short) – Producer 2012
- De Marathon – Producer 2012
- Jackie – Producer 2012
- New Kids Nitro – Producer 2011 €2.5MM
- Nova Zembla – Director, Producer, Writer (Idea) 2011
- New Kids Turbo – Reinout Oerlemans, Producer 2010 €1.5MM
- Dik Trom – Producer 2010
- The Happy Housewife – Producer 2010 €1.8MM
- Stricken – Director, Producer 2009 €3.7MM
- Happy End – Producer 2009
- De brief voor de koning – Producer 2008 €6.8MM
- Diary of a Times Square Thief – Producer 2008
- Duska – Producer2007
- MissiePoo16 (Short) – Producer 2007 €70K
