= New Kids Nitro =

2011 Dutch zombie comedy film

- Theatrical release poster
- Directed by: Steffen Haars; Flip van der Kuil
- Written by: Steffen Haars; Flip van der Kuil
- Based on: New Kids by: Steffen Haars; Flip van der Kuil
- Produced by: Reinout Oerlemans; Hans de Weers
- Starring: Huub Smit; Tim Haars; Wesley van Gaalen; Steffen Haars; Flip van der Kuil
- Cinematography: Joris Kerbosch
- Edited by: Brian Ent; Flip van der Kuil
- Music by: Tom Holkenborg
- Production companies: Eyeworks; Comedy Central; Inspire Pictures
- Distributed by: Benelux Film Distributors
- Release dates: 6 December 2011 (Eindhoven); 8 December 2011 (Netherlands)
- Running time: 77 minutes
- Country: Netherlands
- Language: Dutch
- Box office: $9.4 million

New Kids Nitro is 2011 Dutch zombie horror-comedy film based on the sketch series New Kids. It is a sequel to the 2010 film New Kids Turbo. Like the previous film, It's written and directed by Steffen Haars and Flip van der Kuil, who starred with Tim Haars, Huub Smit and Wesley van Gaalen. Filming took place in Maaskantje, Netersel, Den Dungen, Den Bosch and Schijndel.

The film premiered in Eindhoven on 6 December 2011 and was released on 8 December by Benelux Film Distributors. The film won a Golden Film award for 100.000 visitors.

== Cast ==
- Huub Smit as Richard Batsbak
- Tim Haars as Gerrie van Boven
- Wesley van Gaalen as Rikkert Biemans
- Steffen Haars as Robbie Schuurmans
- Flip van der Kuil as Barrie Butsers

=== Supporting cast ===
- Guido Pollemans as D'n Dave
- Juliette van Ardenne as Deborah
- Jos van Oss as Knoet
- Juul Vrijdag as Corrie Batsbak
- Max van den Burg as Ronnie
- Bart de Rijk as Adrie Agent
- Ruud Matthijsen as Henk van Boven
- Daan van Dijsseldonk as Peter Vernhout
- Filip Bolluyt as Chief of police
- Peter Faber as Minister of Defence

=== Cameos ===
- Marlayne
- Maureen du Toit
- Paul Elstak
- Corry Konings
- Peter Aerts

== Release ==
=== Critical response ===
Floortje Smit of de Volkskrant gave the film a mixed review and wrote "The aura of loosely improvised banter is a bit off. As a result, New Kids Nitro is a better film quality wise, but it has less of the shitty-to-all attitude that hardcore fans are so fond of".

=== Home media ===
The film was released on Blu-ray and DVD on 24 April 2012.
