= Schijndel =

- Town and former municipality
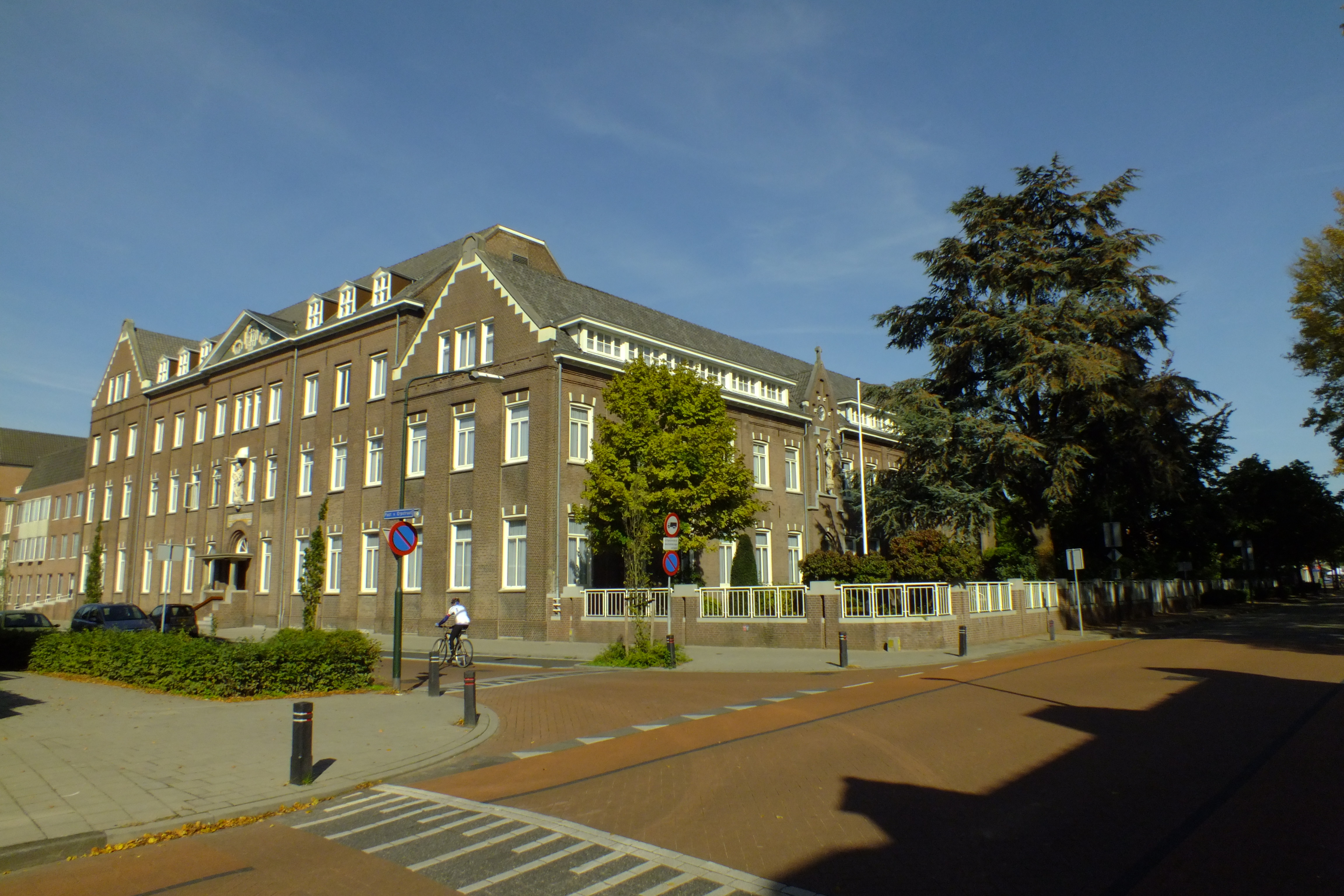
- Former monastery in Schijndel

- Flag Coat of arms

- Location in the province of North Brabant in the Netherlands Schijndel (Netherlands)
- Coordinates: 51°37′N 5°26′E
- Country: Netherlands
- Province: North Brabant
- Municipality: Meierijstad
- Merged: 2017

Area
  - Total: 41.66 km^{2} (16.09 sq mi)
- Elevation: 10 m (33 ft)

Population (2021)
  - Total: 23,705
  - Density: 569.0/km^{2} (1,474/sq mi)
- Demonym: Schijndelaar
- Time zone: UTC+1 (CET)
  - Summer (DST): UTC+2 (CEST)
- Postcode: 5480–5483
- Area code: 073

Schijndel (Dutch pronunciation: [ˈsxɛindəl]) is a town and former municipality in the province of North Brabant, in the south of the Netherlands. Schijndel is located approximately 14 kilometres (8.7 mi) southeast of 's-Hertogenbosch. Schijndel was founded on 6 December 1309. On 1 January 2017 Schijndel, together with Veghel and Sint-Oedenrode, merged into a new municipality, Meierijstad, which created the largest municipality of North Brabant by land area.

== Population centres ==
- Schijndel
- Wijbosch

The municipality had a population of 23,705 in 2021. This figure has remained virtually unchanged since the 1990s.

=== Topography ===
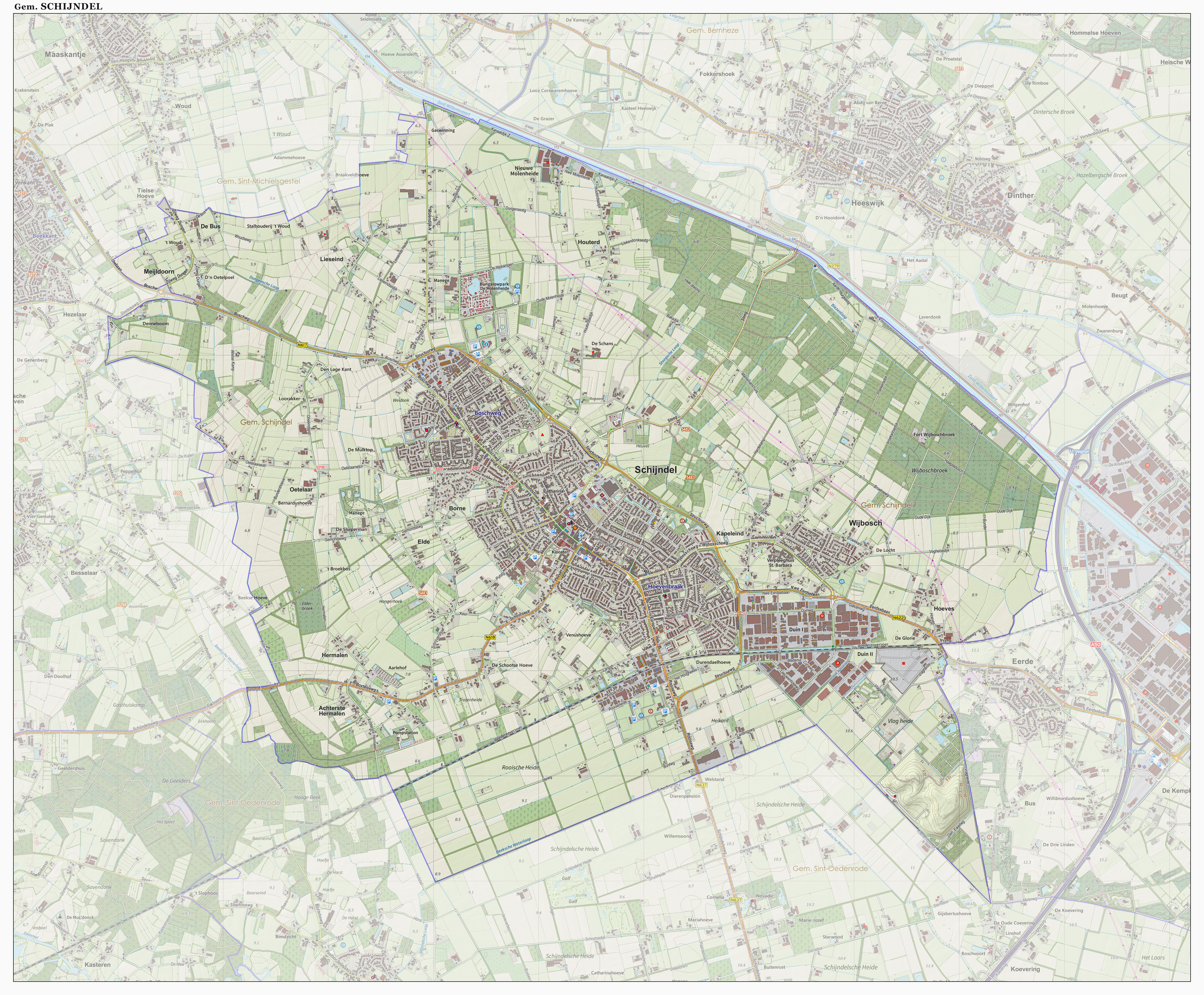

Dutch Topographic map of the municipality of Schijndel, June 2015

== Notable residents ==
- Gérard Buzen, Belgian general\minister of defense
- André Gevers, cyclist
- Winy Maas, architect
- Wiljan Vloet, football manager
- Rai Vloet, football player and son of Wiljan Vloet
- Carli Hermès, photographer and director
- Jack de Gier, football player
- Hein van de Geyn, jazz bassist
- Sissy van Alebeek, cyclist
- Ronald Mutsaars, cyclist
- Manon van den Boogaard, football player
- Said Ali Hussein, football player

== Trivia ==
In the 2010 film New Kids Turbo, the city is hit by a huge bomb that was originally intended to destroy neighboring Maaskantje. Finally, in the sequel New Kids Nitro, a bitter fight rages between a group of young men and a woman from Schijndel and a group of young men from Maaskantje. This also brought Schijndel to the attention of New Kids fans, who had previously almost exclusively traveled to Maaskantje to visit locations from the series and the films.
