= New Kids =

- The cast, from left to right: Rikkert, Robbie, Gerrie, Barrie and Richard
- Genre: Comedy; Black comedy Sketch comedy
- Created by: Steffen Haars; Flip van der Kuil
- Written by: Steffen Haars; Flip van der Kuil
- Directed by: Steffen Haars; Flip van der Kuil
- Starring: Huub Smit; Tim Haars; Wesley van Gaalen; Steffen Haars; Flip van der Kuil; Nicole van Nierop
- Country of origin: Netherlands
- Original language: Dutch
- No. of series: 3
- No. of episodes: 35

Production
- Producer: Gijs Kerbosch
- Production locations: Maaskantje, North Brabant, Netherlands; Den Dungen, North Brabant, Netherlands
- Cinematography: Joris Kerbosch
- Editor: Flip van der Kuil
- Camera setup: Single
- Running time: 3-4 minutes
- Production company: 100% Halal

Original release
- Network: Flabber; NPO 3 Extra; BNN; Comedy Central
- Release: December 2007 – 2009

Related
- New Kids Turbo; De Pulpshow

New Kids is a Dutch comedy sketch series about a group of anti-social youths from Maaskantje, a village in the southern province of North Brabant. It was created by Steffen Haars and Flip van der Kuil.

The show was first shown on Flabber.nl, a Dutch blog, as a succession to De Pulpshow, which aired in 2001. Later, it was picked up by 101 TV and Comedy Central. It was named New Kids on the Block for the first two seasons.

The show became highly popular in both the Netherlands and Germany and spawned two full-length movies, New Kids Turbo and New Kids Nitro.

Most of the locations shot in New Kids are filmed in the nearby village of Den Dungen.

The main characters habitually use the word 'kut' (Dutch slang for vagina), usually at the end of a sentence.

== Overview ==
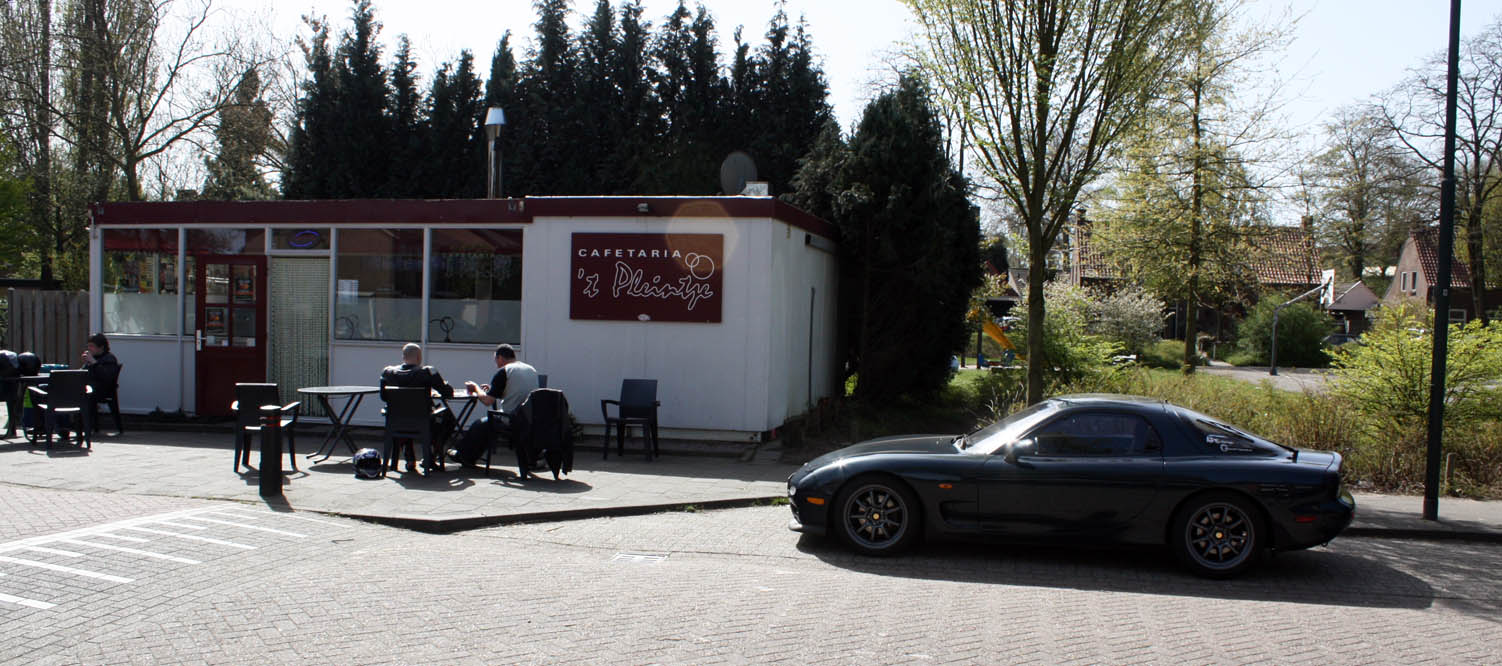
Cafetaria 't Pleintje in Den Dungen, often featured location in comedy sketches by the New Kids

The series follows the misadventures of a group of young men, who live in the small village of Maaskantje in North Brabant. Maaskantje's distinctly rustic and pleasant appearance as a traditional village is juxtaposed by the actions of the group, who are antisocial and indulge in the 'Gabber' culture. They drink excessively, eat junkfood and ride noisily around the village in a garish Opel Manta. Just about every sentence they speak is mindlessly punctuated by the expletive 'kut' ('cunt', in Dutch this word doesn't carry the same severity as it does in English, although it is nevertheless considered rude). Although most of the characters work, none of them appear particularly adept in their jobs.

Despite their antisocial and immature mentality, the group rarely exhibits any serious malicious intent in their actions; much of the humor in the series is derived from the absurdity of the characters' lack of intelligence or even common sense.

A particularly distinct feature of the main characters is the presence of a heavy, somewhat exaggerated Brabantian dialect, which is especially noticeable in the characters' pronunciation of 'jongen' (dude, guy). In the German dubbing the actors voice themselves with a heavy Dutch accent.

== Main characters ==
| Role | Actor | Season | Description |
|---|---|---|---|
| Richard Batsbak | Huub Smit | 2007–2012 | Richard (27) is the leader of the group and he's also the smartest. He has a black belt in taekwondo and works in park maintenance, along with Robbie. He owns an old bulldog named Gratje. |
| Gerrie van Boven | Tim Haars | 2007–2012 | Gerrie (23) regularly tries to prove himself to his friends, but this rarely comes to much good. He works as a forklift-truck driver in a product warehouse, although it is apparent that he doesn't take much care towards his job, as demonstrated in New Kids Turbo when he drives the forks of his forklift truck directly into a boxed plasma television. |
| Rikkert Biemans | Wesley van Gaalen | 2007–2012 | Rikkert (26) works as a mechanic and owns an Opel Manta, which is clearly his most treasured item. He has a distinctive voice, affected by a speech impediment. |
| Robbie Schuurmans | Steffen Haars | 2007–2012 | Robbie (26) works with Richard and is always hungry, frequently eating fried fast food such as frikandels and viandels. |
| Barrie Butsers | Flip van der Kuil | 2007–2012 | Barrie (27) is the strongest in the group and rarely says much. He rides a pink Gilera Citta and is usually wearing the odd combination of bath slippers and a sports jacket. He always wears an oversized gaudy gold chain. |
| Manuela van Grunsven | Nicole van Nierop | 2007–2010 | Manuela is the single mother of two children and is seemingly always heavily pregnant. She works as a cashier at the local supermarket. |
