= Benelux Film Distributors =

Joint venture of various independent film distributors

- Industry: Film industry
- Founded: 2006
- Defunct: 2013
- Headquarters: Ghent, Belgium and Houten, the Netherlands
- Products: Motion pictures
- Number of employees: 10+

Benelux Film Distributors, also known as Benelux Film Distributors Home Entertainment, BFD and BFDHE, was a joint venture of various independent film distributors founded in 2006. They marketed a wide range of films in cinemas and on home video in the Netherlands, Belgium and Luxembourg. They distributed films by Lumière (Belgium), Inspire Pictures (Netherlands) and Dutch FilmWorks (Netherlands). The company Video/Film Express (Houten, Netherlands), founded in 1991, were merged with BFD on January 1, 2012. Subsequently, BFD had two offices in Ghent, Belgium and Houten.

Movies distributed by BFD included Oorlogswinter, Crusade in Jeans, The Letter for the King, Stricken, Love Crime, Amazing Grace, Colombiana, De Marathon, The Happy Housewife, and Black Out.

In June 2011, Lumière and Dutch FilmWorks left BFD to start their own theatrical units. The company merged with A-Film Distribution in May 2013 and continued as A-Film Benelux B.V. In September 2015, A-Film Benelux B.V. was declared bankrupt.

== List of films ==
=== Dutch films ===
Release date	Title	Notes
2000s
4 October 2007	Duska	
16 July 2008	The Letter for the King	
27 November 2008	Winter in Wartime	with Isabella Films, Fu Works, Inspire Pictures and Omroep MAX
29 January 2009	Can Go Through Skin	
26 November 2009	Stricken	with Eyeworks, Inspire Pictures and RTL Entertainment
2010s
12 April 2010	The Happy Housewife	with Eyeworks, Inspire Pictures and RTL Entertainment
24 November 2010	Dik Trom	with Eyeworks and Inspire Pictures
25 November 2010	The Dinner Club	with Infinity Film & TV Productions
9 December 2010	New Kids Turbo	with Eyeworks, Comedy Central and Inspire Pictures
9 June 2011	Rabat	with Habbekrats
20 October 2011	Alfie, the Little Werewolf	with Bos Bros. Film & TV Productions, Inspire Pictures and AVRO
24 November 2011	Nova Zembla	
8 December 2011	New Kids Nitro	with Eyeworks, Comedy Central and Inspire Pictures
22 March 2012	Quiz	with Tom de Mol Productions, Parachute Pictures and AVRO
7 April 2012	Kauwboy	with The Film Kitchen and NTR
10 May 2012	Jackie	
3 October 2012	The Zigzag Kid	with Bos Bros. Film & TV Productions, N279 Entertainment and AVRO
18 October 2012	De Marathon	with Eyeworks, Inspire Pictures and RTL Entertainment
11 April 2013	Daylight	with Eyeworks, Inspire Pictures and NCRV
4 July 2013	Tula: The Revolt	with Fisheye Feature Films

=== Non-Dutch films ===
==== 2006 ====
- 16 Blocks (15/06/06)
- Ask the Dust (22/06/06)
- The Celestine Prophecy (20/07/06)
- Chaos (23/02/06)
- Cirkeline og Verdens Mindste Superhelt (29/06/06)
- Dark Horse (13/04/06)
- The Merchant of Venice (05/01/06)
- Mongolian Ping Pong (03/08/06)
- The Nativity Story (07/12/06)
- Running Scared (30/03/06)
- Slither (29/06/06)
- The Page Turner (30/11/06)
- Tristan & Isolde (20/04/06)
- The White Masai (23/03/06)
- The Wicker Man (31/08/06)

==== 2007 ====
- 1408 (30/08/07)
- 30 Days of Night (08/11/07)
- Bobby (18/01/07)
- Congorama (02/08/07)
- Copying Beethoven (28/06/07)
- Employee of the Month (19/04/07)
- Georgia Rule (13/09/07)
- The Good Shepherd (15/02/07)
- Hannibal Rising (08/03/07)
- Infamous (16/08/07)
- Knollhart (24/05/07)
- The Last Legion (02/08/07)
- Man of the Year (25/01/07)
- The Messengers (31/05/07)
- Mr. Magorium's Wonder Emporium (06/12/07)
- Once in a Lifetime: The Extraordinary Story of the New York Cosmos (30/08/07)
- Rescue Dawn (23/08/07)
- Salvador (29/03/07)
- White Noise 2: The Light (19/07/07)
- The Witnesses (12/07/07)

==== 2008 ====
- Amazing Grace (16/10/08)
- The Bank Job (25/09/08)
- Berlin: Live at St. Ann's Warehouse (03/04/08)
- City of Men (30/10/08)
- Elite Squad (22/05/08)
- Empties (27/03/08)
- Fear(s) of the Dark (24/04/08)
- The Grocer's Son (17/07/08)
- The Hunting Party (03/04/08)
- In the Name of the King (07/08/08)
- I've Loved You So Long (05/06/08)
- Mark of an Angel (18/12/08)
- The Mist (07/02/08)
- Mongol (14/08/08)
- The Night of the Sunflowers (10/07/08)
- Sagan (02/10/08)
- Saw IV (03/01/08)
- Silk (01/05/08)
- Superhero Movie (28/08/08)

==== 2009 ====
- Cheri (25/06/09)
- The Cove (03/12/09)
- Eden Lake (14/05/09)
- Encounters at the End of the World (11/06/09)
- Gamer (08/10/09)
- The Girl with the Dragon Tattoo (06/08/09)
- In the Electric Mist (16/07/09)
- Leaving (22/10/09)
- Man on Wire (12/03/09)
- The Reader (02/04/09)
- Saw V (08/01/09)
- Saw VI (31/12/09)
- The September Issue (17/09/09)
- Sorority Row (22/10/09)
- Stella (05/03/09)
- Towelhead (14/05/09)
- Versailles (01/01/09)
- Zack and Miri Make a Porno (22/01/09)

==== 2010 ====
- The American (18/09/10)
- Agora (03/06/10)
- Bad Lieutenant: Port of Call New Orleans (11/03/10)
- The Blonde with Bare Breasts (24/06/10)
- The Box (04/02/10)
- Brooklyn's Finest (29/07/10)
- Daybreakers (25/02/10)
- Easy Money (07/10/10)
- Exam (22/07/10)
- The Expendables (19/08/10)
- Father of My Children (01/04/10)
- Five Minutes of Heaven (29/07/10)
- The Ghost Writer (20/05/10)
- The Girl Who Kicked the Hornets' Nest (25/03/10)
- The Girl Who Played with Fire (21/01/10)
- Greenberg (08/07/10)
- The Joneses (12/08/10)
- Love Crime (19/08/10)
- Oceans (22/04/10)
- Of Gods and Men (18/11/10)
- The Road (18/03/10)
- Sarah's Key (28/10/10)
- Splice (16/09/10)
- Tomorrow at Dawn (20/05/10)

==== 2011 ====
- Beloved (15/12/11)
- Colombiana (22/09/11)
- Conan the Barbarian (08/09/11)
- The Conspirator (04/08/11)
- The Disappearance of Alice Creed (20/01/11)
- Drive Angry (25/02/11)
- The Experiment (31/03/11)
- Free Men (17/11/11)
- Kaboom (28/04/11)
- Last Night (24/03/11)
- Lights Out (10/03/11)
- Margin Call (10/11/11)
- The Mechanic (17/03/11)
- The Monk (01/09/11)
- No et moi (24/02/11)
- Norwegian Wood (06/01/11)
- One Day (06/10/11)
- Rabbit Hole (07/04/11)
- Saw 3D (06/01/11)
- The Son of No One (14/07/11)
- Three (24/03/11)
- Toast (01/09/11)
- Tous les soleils (02/06/11)
- Trust (16/06/11)
- Twelve (20/01/11)
- Unforgivable (27/10/11)

==== 2012 ====
- Being Flynn (27/09/12)
- Black Gold (26/01/12)
- Cloud Atlas (29/11/12)
- 360 (16/08/12)
- Ill Manors (30/08/12)
- Our Children (13/09/12)
- Moonrise Kingdom (31/05/12)

==== 2013 ====
- Hyde Park on Hudson (10/01/13)
