= Nova Zembla (film) =

2011 film by Reinout Oerlemans

- Theatrical release poster
- Directed by: Reinout Oerlemans
- Screenplay by: Reinout Oerlemans
- Produced by: Hans de Weers; Reinout Oerlemans
- Starring: Robert de Hoog; Derek de Lint; Doutzen Kroes
- Cinematography: Lennert Hillege
- Edited by: Michiel Reichwein
- Music by: Melcher Meirmans; Merlijn Snitker; Chrisnanne Wiegel
- Production company: Eyeworks
- Distributed by: Benelux Film Distributors
- Release date: 24 November 2011
- Running time: 108 minutes
- Country: Netherlands
- Language: Dutch
- Box office: $11 million

Nova Zembla is a 2011 Dutch historical drama film directed by Reinout Oerlemans. It is the first Dutch feature film in 3D.

The film describes the last journey of Willem Barentsz and Jacob van Heemskerk through 1596–1597 when they and their crew tried to discover the Northeast Passage to the Indies. However, due to the sea ice, they are stranded on the island of Novaya Zemlya and have to spend the winter there in Het Behouden Huys (The Safe Home). The story is told through the eyes of Gerrit de Veer, and is loosely based on a diary he published in 1598 after his safe return. Gerrit is portrayed as having a relationship with Catharina Plancius, the daughter of the astronomer, cartographer and reverend Petrus Plancius, who pioneered the concept of the North East passage to reach the Indies. The Novaya Zemlya effect, first described by De Veer, is shown in the film, albeit in a non-historical fashion.

== Cast ==
- Robert de Hoog as Gerrit de Veer
- Derek de Lint as Willem Barentsz
- Victor Reinier as Jacob van Heemskerk
- Jan Decleir as Petrus Plancius
- Doutzen Kroes as Catharina Plancius
- Semmy Schilt as Claes

== Filming locations ==
The film was filmed on location in Iceland, Belgium, Canada and the Netherlands. The scenes set in Amsterdam were filmed in Bruges (Brugge).

== Critical response ==
According to Variety, the screenplay was "too light on historical background and character development," while the movie was "coming off as a technically competent but narratively uninvolving History Channel-like reenactment." The acting was considered "weak."

== Soundtrack ==
The musical theme of the movie was remixed by Dutch DJ and producer Armin van Buuren.

== See also ==
- Boat Trip 3D (2008), the first Dutch digital 3D short film
