= Duska =

Duska may refer to:

- DShK (ДШК, for Дегтярёва-Шпагина Крупнокалиберный, Degtyaryova-Shpagina Krupnokaliberny, 'Degtyaryov-Shpagin Large-Calibre') is a Soviet heavy anti-aircraft machine gun.
- Duska (film) (Russian and Ukrainian: Душка), a 2007 film by Dutch director Jos Stelling
