= Jelka van Houten =

Dutch actress (born 1978)

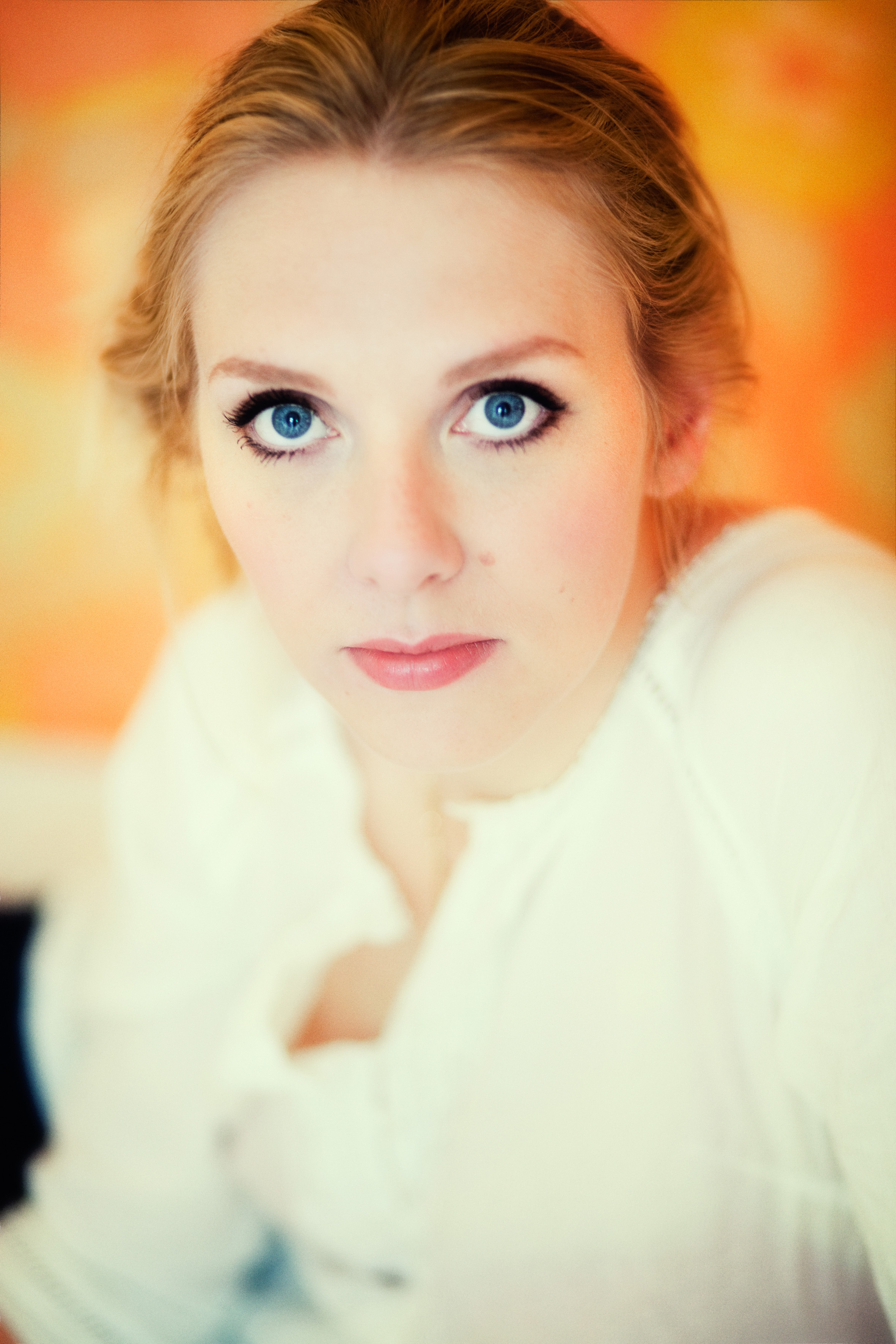
- van Houten in 2010
- Born: Jelline Floriska van Houten; 1 September 1978 (age 47); Culemborg, Gelderland, Netherlands
- Education: Netherlands Film and Television Academy
- Occupations: Actress, singer
- Years active: 2001–present
- Spouse: Koppe Koppeschaar (m. 2010; div. 2016)
- Children: 3
- Parent(s): Theodore van Houten; Margje Stasse
- Relatives: Carice van Houten (sister); Guy Pearce (brother-in-law)
- Website: www.jelkavanhouten.nl

Jelline Floriska van Houten (Dutch pronunciation: [jɛˈlinə floːˈrɪskaː ˈjɛlkaː vɑn ˈɦʌutə(n)]; born 1 September 1978) is a Dutch actress and singer. She has acted in Dutch films, musicals, and television series. She also played Sabine in the British TV series Fresh Meat.

She won the John Kraaijkamp Musical Award twice, in 2006 for her role in the musical Turks fruit and in 2010 for her role in the musical Dromen... zijn bedrog.

== Early life and education ==
Jelline Floriska van Houten was born on 1 September 1978 in Culemborg in the Netherlands, the daughter of Margje Stasse and the writer and broadcaster Theodore van Houten. She is the younger sister of actress Carice van Houten. She later studied production design at the Netherlands Film and Television Academy in Amsterdam.

== Acting career ==
While studying at the Film and Television Academy, van Houten made her film debut as an obsessed killer in Liefje (2001). She was nominated for a Gouden Notekraker. The jury which nominated her said that "her surprising début holds a lot in store for the future".

In 2006, van Houten won a John Kraaijkamp Musical Award for her leading role of Olga in the musical Turks Fruit (2005).

She played Sheila in the musical Hair (2007). In 2010, she won another John Kraaijkamp Musical Award for her supporting role in the small musical production Dromen... zijn bedrog (2009). She played the role of Daan in the film Jackie (2012), alongside her sister Carice van Houten, and she was nominated for the Golden Calf for Best Actress but did not win.

In 2022, she appeared in the comedy series Tropenjaren.

== Personal life ==
Van Houten was married to Koppe Koppeschaar until 2016; they have two children. Van Houten is currently in a relationship with Dutch comedian Henry van Loon, they have 1 child together.

== Filmography ==
=== Films ===
Year	Title	Role	Notes
2001	Liefje	Esther Valkhof	
2004	Schat	Fountain girl	Short film
2005	Een ingewikkeld verhaal, eenvoudig verteld	Mai	Short film
2006	Raak	Ingrid	Short film
2007	Anna	Brecht	TV movie
2007	Dennis P.	Colleague Suzan	
2008	Summer Heat	Jara	
2009	Life Is Beautiful		TV movie
2009	De indiaan	Pregnant woman	
2010	Near Neighbours	Machteld	TV movie
2012	Jackie	Daan	
2012	The Domino Effect	Antoinette	
2013	Midden in De Winternacht	Kirsten	
2015	Jack bestelt een broertje	Sanne	
2019	Amsterdam Vice	Wachtcommandant Selma	

=== TV series ===
Year	Title	Role	Notes
2004	Costa		Episode "Zon, Zee, Seks en Eendagsvliegen"
2005	Bitches	Esther de Vries	Episode "Working Bitch"
2006	Rozengeur & Wodka Lime	Judith	Episode "Recht door zee"
2006	't Schaep Met De 5 Pooten	Rosita Lefèvre	Episode "Het zal je kind maar wezen!"
2007	Gooische Vrouwen	Bella	Episode 3.4
2009	Shouf shouf!	Alex Verhoeven	12 episodes
2011	Verborgen gebreken	Linda van Schoonhoven	9 episodes
2011–2012	Mixed Up	Fay Vogel	8 episodes
2012	Wat als?		8 episodes
2012–2016	Fresh Meat	Sabine	12 episodes
2014	Jeuk!	Jelka	29 episodes
2014	Aaf	Jacky	Episode 2.1
2014	Het Sinterklaasjournaal	Mother with child	Episode 18
2015	Gouden Bergen	Noortje	
2015	Trollie	Berber	
2022	Tropenjaren	Rosa	
