= Messi and Maud =

2017 film

- Film poster
- Directed by: Marleen Jonkman
- Written by: Daan Gielis
- Produced by: Hans de Weers
- Starring: Cristóbal Farias; Rifka Lodeizen
- Release dates: 8 September 2017 (TIFF); 26 January 2018 (Netherlands)
- Running time: 92 minutes
- Country: Netherlands
- Languages: Spanish; Dutch

Messi and Maud (Spanish: La Holandesa) is a 2017 Dutch drama film directed by Marleen Jonkman. In July 2018, it was one of nine films shortlisted to be the Dutch entry for the Best Foreign Language Film at the 91st Academy Awards, but it was not selected.

== Cast ==
- Cristóbal Farias as Messi
- Rifka Lodeizen as Maud
