= Carice van Houten =

Dutch actress (born 1976)

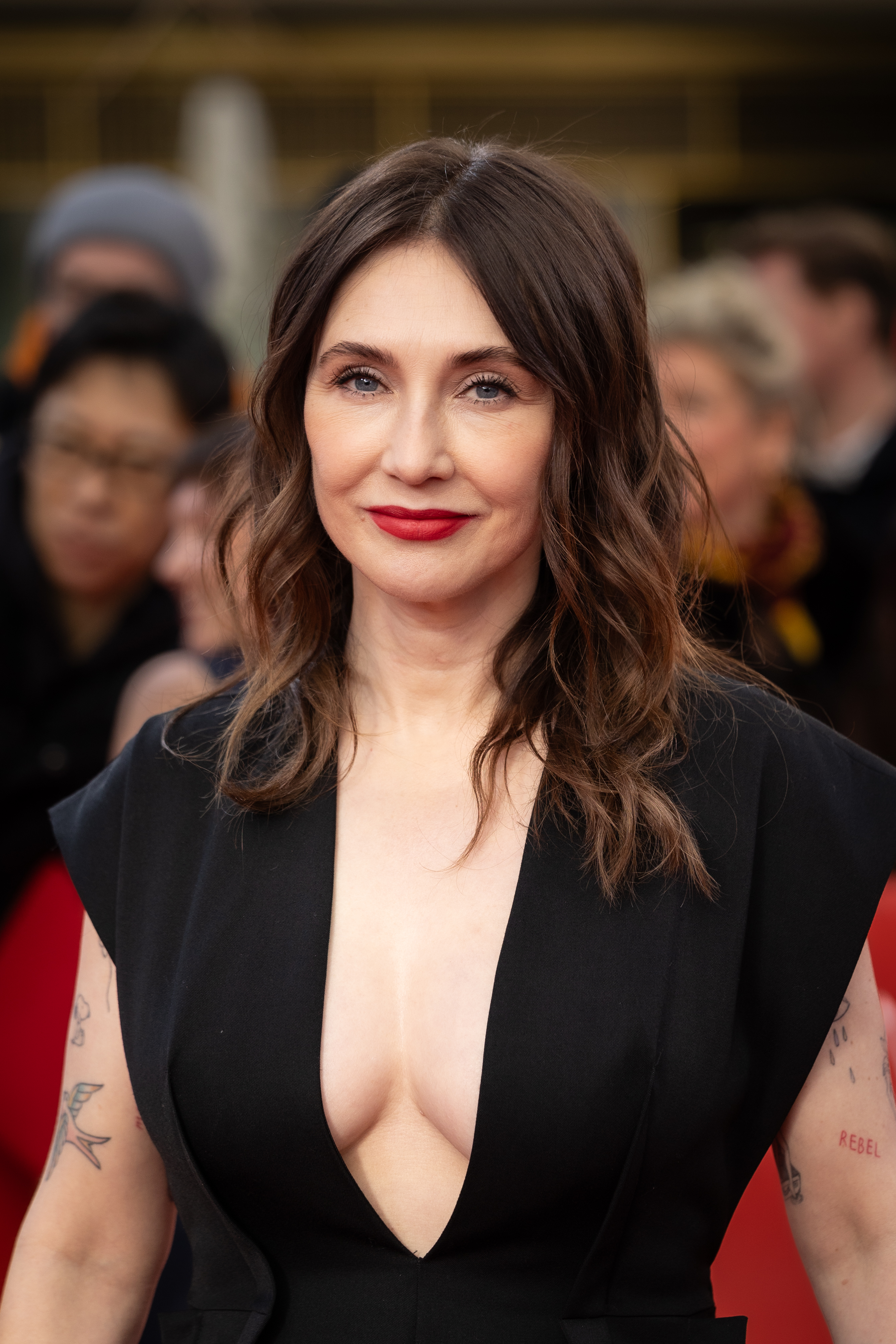
- Van Houten in 2026
- Born: Carice Anouk van Houten; 5 September 1976 (age 50); Leiderdorp, Netherlands
- Occupation: Actress
- Years active: 1997–present
- Partner(s): Sebastian Koch (2005–2009); Guy Pearce (2015–2025)
- Children: 1
- Parent(s): Theodore van Houten; Margje Stasse
- Relatives: Jelka van Houten (sister)
- Website: caricevanhouten.com

Carice Anouk van Houten (Dutch: [kaːˈris(ə ʔ)aːˈnuk vɑn ˈɦʌutə(n)]; born 5 September 1976) is a Dutch actress. Her first leading role in the television film Suzy Q (1999) won her the Golden Calf for Best Acting in a Television Drama; two years later, she won the Golden Calf for Best Actress for Miss Minoes (2001).

She gained widespread recognition for her performance in Black Book (2006), the most commercially successful Dutch film to date, for which she won her second Golden Calf for Best Actress, in addition to nominations from the Chicago Film Critics Association, the European Film Academy, and the Online Film Critics Society. She was nominated for a Saturn Award for Best Supporting Actress for Valkyrie (2008), and won her fourth and fifth Golden Calf Awards for Best Actress for The Happy Housewife (2010) and Black Butterflies (2011). Her other notable English-language performances include Repo Men (2010), Black Death (2010), and Brimstone (2016).

Van Houten received international recognition for her role as Melisandre on the HBO television series Game of Thrones (2012–2019), for which she received nominations for two Screen Actors Guild Awards for Outstanding Performance by an Ensemble in a Drama Series and a Primetime Emmy Award for Outstanding Guest Actress in a Drama Series.

== Early life ==
Van Houten was born in Leiderdorp, Netherlands. She was brought up watching silent films and in an interview she professed to prefer playing scenes without dialogue. She has a younger sister, Jelka van Houten, who is also an actress. Her paternal grandmother was Scottish. Van Houten went to the St. Bonifatiuscollege (high school) in Utrecht, where she played the leading role in Hugo Claus' Tijl Uilenspieghel, directed by Ad Migchielsen. Van Houten studied briefly at the Maastricht Academy of Dramatic Arts but continued her professional education after one year at the Kleinkunstacademie in Amsterdam.

== Acting career ==
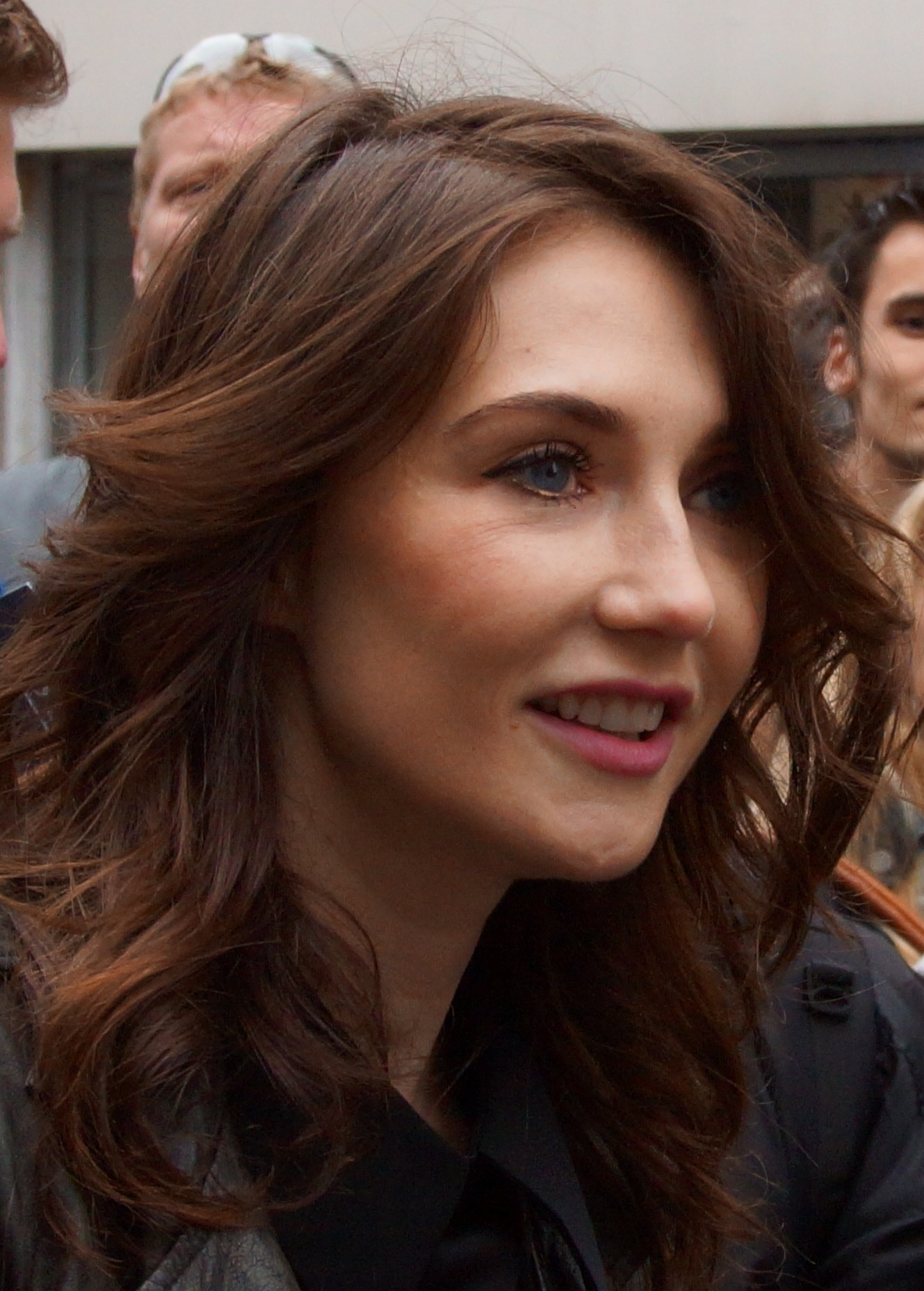
Carice van Houten in 2013

Van Houten played her first leading role in Martin Koolhoven's TV film Suzy Q. She won a Golden Calf for her part as Suzy. She also won the Pisuisse Award and the Top Naeff Award for her stage acting and another Golden Calf for her part as the kitten that becomes a woman in Miss Minoes (2001). The first time she could be seen in cinemas in the U.S. was when Martin Koolhoven's AmnesiA (2001) got a small theatrical release.

Van Houten won a Golden Calf for her performance as Rachel Stein in Black Book (2006) at the Netherlands Film Festival. Black Book's director Paul Verhoeven said about her in a television interview: "Never in my life I have worked with an actress this talented", and when asked to compare her with Sharon Stone he said "Carice can really act." The international press was also enthusiastic about her role in Black Book.

In December 2006, van Houten withdrew from a theatre production of Alex van Warmerdam for personal reasons. According to a theatre spokesman it was because of a work overload.

In 2008, she starred in the non-commercial short movie Zingen in het donker (English: Singing in the dark), a drama on domestic violence. She appeared in the magazine Vanity Fair in the issue for March 2008, photographed by Wayne Maser. In 2008, van Houten had a role opposite Leonardo DiCaprio in Body of Lies but her scenes did not make the final cut of the movie.

In April 2009, it was announced that van Houten would star in Black Death by British director Christopher Smith and in the Dutch film Komt een vrouw bij de dokter (English title: Stricken), based on the novel of the same name by Ray Kluun. She also starred in the science fiction thriller Repo Men.

In July 2011, van Houten was cast as the priestess Melisandre in the second season of HBO's fantasy TV series Game of Thrones. Her performance has garnered her praise and recognition, earning her a Primetime Emmy Award nomination for Outstanding Guest Actress in a Drama Series for her final performance as the character in the season 8 episode "The Long Night" in 2019. After nominations were announced for the ceremony, van Houten received considerable media attention for having been one of the three nominated actors from the show to have self-submitted and paid entry fees to be on the ballot for Emmy consideration after HBO had not done so for them. She has also received three Screen Actors Guild Award nominations for Outstanding Performance by an Ensemble in a Drama Series in 2014, 2016, and 2017 for the role.

In 2012, van Houten appeared in Antony and the Johnsons' "Cut the world" video, which was directed by Nabil Elderkin and also starred Willem Dafoe and Marina Abramović.

In 2019, van Houten starred as a prison therapist that becomes infatuated with one of her patients, a serial rapist, in Halina Reijn's directorial debut Instinct. The film premiered at the Locarno Film Festival, receiving the Variety Piazza Grande Award and was selected as the Dutch submission for Best International Feature Film at the 92nd Academy Awards. Variety's Guy Lodge described van Houten as being "on electrifying form" and Reijn's direction "provides a fearsome reminder" of the former's breakthrough performance in Black Book.

She narrates the Dutch-language version of Steve McQueen's 2023 film De Bezette Stad (Occupied City).

== Personal life ==
Van Houten and Australian actor Guy Pearce, whom she met on the set of Brimstone, were in a relationship starting in 2015. In August 2016, she gave birth to their son, Monte Pearce. In 2025, Van Houten said she and Pearce had not been a couple "for years." She previously dated German actor Sebastian Koch; they met on the set of the 2006 film Black Book.

Van Houten speaks Dutch, English, German, and French.

Van Houten has stated that Hollywood makes her unhappy: "I have seen Hollywood, and although I have nothing against it, it's not my kind of life. My agent is shocked that I want to stay in Europe," adding, "If Hollywood offers me a great part, of course I'll take it, but I just don't want to live there".

Van Houten has been friends with fellow Dutch actress Halina Reijn since 1994. They worked together in the movies Black Book and Valkyrie. In 2013, the two published a book called Anti Glamour, a parody style guide and a celebration of their friendship, as well as a candid look into the unglamorous back-stage side of their lives.

Van Houten is a lifelong fan of Laurel and Hardy. In June 2016, she called in to The Ross Owen Show on Black Sky Radio to talk about her love of the comedy duo.

In both May and September 2023, she was arrested along with more than 1,500 others blocking the A12 motorway in The Hague during a climate protest organized by Extinction Rebellion; she was later released. She has supported ecocide being made a crime at the International Criminal Court, stating: "We are intrinsically linked to the natural world and its magical ecosystems that have provided for us for so long. We must no longer just take. It is time to give back. We owe it to the Earth. Ecocide is a crime and must be punished as such."

In August 2023, van Houten voiced her support for Operation Identify Me, an initiative launched in May of the same year, which is focused on establishing the identities of 22 unknown females found throughout Western Europe between 1976 and 2019. Most were the victims of violent crimes.

In 2024, van Houten participated in a video series published by the Palestine Festival of Literature in support of South Africa's case against Israel at the International Court of Justice.

== Filmography ==
Year	Film	Role	Notes
1997	3 ronden	Emily	
1998	Ivory Guardians	unknown	
1999	Suzy Q	Suzy	
2001	Storm in mijn hoofd	Peaseblossom / Titania	
2001	AmnesiA	Sandra	
2001	Miss Minoes	Minoes	
2002	The Wild Boar	Pandora	
2003	Father's Affair	Monika	
2005	Black Swans	Marleen	
2005	Lepel	Miss Broer	
2005	Bonkers	Lis	
2006	A Thousand Kisses	Samarinde	
2006	Black Book	Rachel Stein / Ellis de Vries	
2007	Love is All	Kiki Jollema	
2008	Dorothy Mills	Jane van Dopp	
2008	Valkyrie	Nina Schenk Gräfin von Stauffenberg	
2009	Stricken	Carmen	
2009	From Time to Time	Maria Oldknow	
2010	Repo Men	Carol	
2010	The Happy Housewife	Lea	
2010	Black Death	Langiva	
2010	Satisfaction		
2011	Intruders	Susanna	
2011	Black Butterflies	Ingrid Jonker	
2011	Vivaldi	Julietta	
2012	Jackie	Sophie	
2012	Family Way	Winnie de Roover	
2013	The Fifth Estate	Birgitta Jónsdóttir	
2016	Race	Leni Riefenstahl	
2016	Brimstone	Anna	
2016	Incarnate		
2019	The Affair	Hana	
2019	Domino	Alex	
2019	Instinct	Nicoline	Also producer
2020	Lost Girls & Love Hotels	Ines	
2025	Miss Moxy	Pink	
2026	A Family	Maria	

=== Television ===
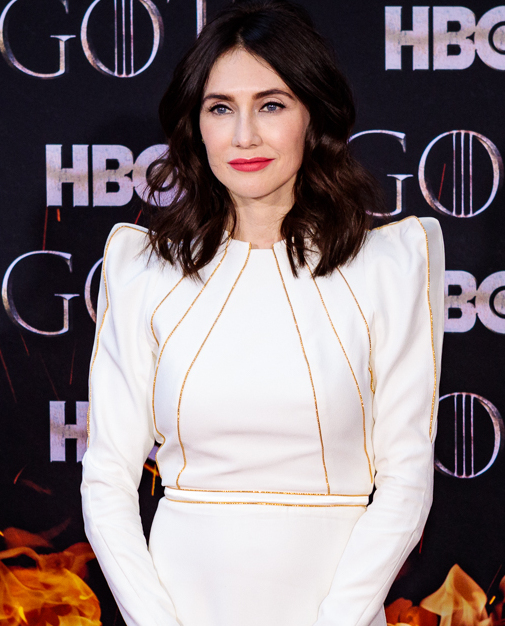
Carice van Houten in 2019

Year	Title	Role	Notes
1997	Het Labyrint	Mariek	Television series
1999	Suzy Q	Suzy	Television film
2000	Goede daden bij daglicht: Op weg	Carola	Television film
2001	De acteurs	Ellie	Television series
2002	Luifel & Luifel	Roos	Episode: "De Krottenkoning"
2004	Russen	José Machielsen	Episode: "De zevende getuige"
2004	Kopspijkers	Georgina Verbaan	Episode: "Dance-4-Life"
2006	Koppensnellers	Georgina Verbaan	Episode: "1.16"
2009	Gewoon Hans	Herself	Television film
2010	In therapie	Aya	3 episodes
2011	Human Planet	Narrator	Dutch dubbing
2012–2019	Game of Thrones	Melisandre of Asshai	29 episodes
2015	The Simpsons	Annika van Houten (voice)	Episode: "Let's Go Fly a Coot"
2016	Robot Chicken	Melisandre, Wife, Mama Bear (voices)	Episode: "Triple Hot Dog Sandwich on Wheat"
2019	Temple	Anna Willems	Television series
2020	Red Light	Sylvia Steenhuyzen	Television series
2022	Dangerous Liaisons	Jacqueline de Montrachet	Television Series
2025	Malice	Nat Tanner	Television Series

== Discography ==
- Black Book (soundtrack) (2007) - vocals on four songs
- See You on the Ice (2012) - full album produced by JB Meijers
- "Fear Not" (2015) - single with Michael Prins
- Once Upon a Time in Shaolin (2015) by Wu-Tang Clan
- Bobbie Gentry's The Delta Sweete Revisited (2019) by Mercury Rev - vocals on Parchman Farm

== Awards and nominations ==
Year	Award	Category	Nominated work	Result
1999	Golden Calf Award	Best Acting in a Television Drama	Suzy Q	Won
2002	Golden Calf Award	Best Actress	Miss Minoes	Won
2002	International Children's Film Festival	Best Actress	Miss Minoes	Won
2002	Carrousel international du film de Rimouski	Best Actress	Miss Minoes	Won
2005	Golden Calf Award	Best Actress	Black Swans	Nominated
2006	Golden Calf Award	Best Actress	Black Book	Won
2006	Rembrandt Award	Best Actress	Black Book	Won
2006	Chicago Film Critics Association Award	Best Actress	Black Book	Nominated
2006	European Film Award	Best Actress	Black Book	Nominated
2006	German Film Award	Best Actress	Black Book	Nominated
2006	Online Film Critics Society Award	Best Breakthrough Performance	Black Book	Nominated
2006	Saturn Award	Best Actress	Black Book	Nominated
2008	Rembrandt Award	Best Actress	Love is All	Won
2008	Saturn Award	Best Supporting Actress	Valkyrie	Nominated
2010	Rembrandt Award	Best Actress	Stricken	Won
2010	Golden Film Award	Best Actress	Stricken	Won
2010	Fangoria Chainsaw Award	Best Supporting Actress	Black Death	Nominated
2011	Rembrandt Award	Best Actress	The Happy Housewife	Won
2011	Golden Film Award	Best Actress	The Happy Housewife	Won
2011	Golden Calf Award	Best Actress	The Happy Housewife	Won
2012	Rembrandt Award	Best Actress	Black Butterflies	Won
2012	Golden Film Award	Best Actress	Black Butterflies	Won
2012	Golden Calf Award	Best Actress	Black Butterflies	Won
2012	Tribeca Film Festival	Best Actress in a Narrative Feature Film	Black Butterflies	Won
2012	Golden Film Award	Best Actress	Jackie	Won
2012	Rembrandt Award	Best Actress	Jackie	Nominated
2013	Rembrandt Award	Best Actress	Family Way	Won
2013	Screen Actors Guild Award	Outstanding Performance by an Ensemble in a Drama Series	Game of Thrones	Nominated
2015	Screen Actors Guild Award	Outstanding Performance by an Ensemble in a Drama Series	Game of Thrones	Nominated
2016	Screen Actors Guild Award	Outstanding Performance by an Ensemble in a Drama Series	Game of Thrones	Nominated
2017	Golden Calf Award	Best Supporting Actress	Brimstone	Nominated
2019	Primetime Emmy Award	Outstanding Guest Actress in a Drama Series	Game of Thrones	Nominated
2020	Golden Calf Award	Best Actress	Instinct	Nominated
2020	Golden Calf Award	Best Actress in a Television Drama	Red Light	Nominated
