= Black Book (soundtrack) =

- Album cover of Black Book

Soundtrack album by Anne Dudley
- Released: 2 October 2006
- Recorded: Angel Recording Studios, London
- Length: 55:36
- Language: English, German
- Label: Milan Records, Warner
- Producer: Roger Dudley

The album Black Book is the soundtrack of the film Black Book (2006). The album was supposed to be released on 29 September 2006 by Warner, but this was rescheduled. The first release was on 2 October 2006 by Milan Records.

The album contains 23 tracks. The first four tracks, songs from the 1930s and 1940s, are sung by actress Carice van Houten. In the film Black Book she plays Rachel Stein, a singer from Berlin. The first of these four songs is in English and the other three are in German. The other 19 tracks on the album are written by Anne Dudley. The music is arranged and conducted by Anne Dudley. The album is produced by Roger Dudley.

== Track listing ==
No.	Title	Lyrics	Music	Vocals	Length
1.	"A Hundred Years from Today"	Ned Washington, Joe Young	Victor Young	Carice van Houten	2:15
2.	"Ich bin die fesche Lola"	Robert Liebmann	Friedrich Hollaender	Carice van Houten	0:56
3.	"Ja, das ist meine Melodie"	Bruno Balz	Werner Bochmann	Carice van Houten	3:22
4.	"Ich tanze mit dir in den Himmel hinein"	F. Schöder	Hans Fritz Beckmann	Carice van Houten	3:30
5.	"Rachel's Theme"		Anne Dudley		1:28
6.	"The Black Book"		Anne Dudley		2:18
7.	"Escape Through The Marshes"		Anne Dudley		2:42
8.	"In Pursuit"		Anne Dudley		3:03
9.	"Rachel's Plan"		Anne Dudley		1:38
10.	"In Too Deep"		Anne Dudley		1:56
11.	"Shot At Dawn"		Anne Dudley		2:00
12.	"Sleeping With The Enemy"		Anne Dudley		3:01
13.	"Escape Plans"		Anne Dudley		3:01
14.	"The Insider"		Anne Dudley		1:57
15.	"Falling Into The Trap"		Anne Dudley		1:45
16.	"Confessions Of The Night"		Anne Dudley		3:13
17.	"Escape By Sea"		Anne Dudley		1:33
18.	"A Hero Of The Resistance"		Anne Dudley		3:19
19.	"Intelligence Gathering"		Anne Dudley		2:05
20.	"Rumours Of Liberation"		Anne Dudley		2:16
21.	"Victims Of The Occupation"		Anne Dudley		1:34
22.	"Rachel's Retribution"		Anne Dudley		4:40
23.	"The Endless River"		Anne Dudley		2:04
Total length:					55:36
