= Bro's Before Ho's =

2013 film by Steffen Haars

- Theatrical release poster
- Directed by: Steffen Haars; Flip van der Kuil
- Starring: Tim Haars; Daniël Arends; Sylvia Hoeks
- Music by: The Flexican; Sef
- Distributed by: A-Film Benelux
- Release date: 5 December 2013
- Running time: 87 minutes
- Country: Netherlands
- Language: Dutch
- Box office: $3,860,405

Bro's Before Ho's is a 2013 Dutch romantic comedy film directed by Steffen Haars and Flip van der Kuil. The film music was scored by The Flexican and Sef.

== Plot ==
Two brothers, swore as children that they would never have a relationship with a woman, following urgent advice from their father. As adults, Max is a video store employee and Jules is a supermarket assistant manager. Together they go out all the time and sleep with many girls, (and Jules often has sex in the store's warehouse with female subordinates too), but dump them just as easily.

One day later, Max discovers that his brother Jules has slept with Anna. Although Anna was a typical one-night stand for him at first, they meet more and more often until the two even want to move in together.

Until they both fall in love with Anna, a counselor for mentally disabled people. One person she work with is Jordy, who becomes restless and violent when he can't watch porn movies. Other events at the mentally disabled facility are direct parodies of scenes from One Flew Over the Cuckoo's Nest.

Max discovers that his brother Jules has slept with Anna. Although it was at first a one-night stand, Jules and Anna decide to move in together. Max then acts very cold towards Anna.

However, Jules changes his mind about living with Anna. Jules also allows Max to move toward a relationship with Anna. Anna is initially angry with Max, because he unintentionally caused Anna to be fired after Max gave porn DVDs to Jordy for which Anna was blamed. The scene where Max orders porn films by phone is taken from the American film Clerks (1994).

In the end (after Jules and Max stay in prison after a clash with the police when they are out with the disabled unauthorized) things work out well between them.

In between there is also the storyline of René, friend of Max and Jules, whose girlfriend Suzanne is breaking up. It will eventually work out between them, too.

As the credits role, the cast re-enact scenes from Pulp Fiction, Jaws, Menace II Society, Rocky, Braveheart, Fight Club, New Kids Turbo and American History X.

== Cast ==
- Tim Haars as Max
- Daniël Arends as Jules
- Sylvia Hoeks as Anna
- Jennifer Hoffman as Suzanne
- Birgit Schuurman as Mercedes
- Huub Smit as Jordy
