= Quiz (2012 film) =

2012 Dutch film

- Theatrical release poster
- Directed by: Dick Maas
- Written by: Dick Maas
- Produced by: Tom de Mol; Dick Maas
- Starring: Pierre Bokma; Barry Atsma
- Cinematography: Piotr Kukla
- Edited by: Bert Rijkelijkhuizen
- Music by: Dick Maas
- Production companies: Tom de Mol Productions; Parachute Pictures; AVRO
- Distributed by: Benelux Film Distributors
- Release date: 22 March 2012
- Running time: 85 minutes
- Country: Netherlands
- Language: Dutch
- Budget: €1.8 million
- Box office: $718,409

Quiz is a 2012 Dutch thriller film written and directed by Dick Maas. The film follows a quizmaster who's approached by a man who claims he kidnapped his wife and daughter. It was released on 22 March 2012 by Benelux Film Distributors. The film received mixed reviews.

== Synopsis ==
After presenting his last show, quizmaster Leo Vandermolen is sitting in a restaurant waiting for his wife Sandra and daughter Monica when he is approached by a strange man. he shows a picture of Leo's wife and daughter, handcuffed and with tape over their mouths. Leo first thinks it is a joke, but the man proves that he kidnapped them and also that he has a lot of private information about the family. The man tells Leo that he has an hour to answer 10 questions. Should he fail, his wife and daughter will drown in a water tank used on Leo's show.

== Cast ==
- Barry Atsma as Leo Vandermolen
- Pierre Bokma as The Kidnapper
- Stephan Evenblij as Koos
- Carly Wijs as Paula
- Marck Oostra as Gerant
- Hanna Verboom as Louise
- Kim van Kooten as Sandra
- Susan Radder as Monica

== Release ==
The film was released on DVD, Blu-ray and Video on Demand on 29 August 2012.
