= Marcel Hensema =

Dutch actor (born 1970)

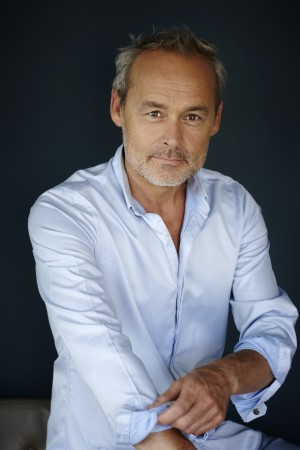
- Hensema in 2018
- Born: 16 April 1970 (age 56); Winschoten, Netherlands
- Occupation: Actor
- Years active: 1993–present
- Website: www.marcelhensema.nl

Marcel Hensema (born 16 April 1970) is a Dutch film actor. He appeared in more than seventy films since 1993. In 2007 he won the Golden Calf for Best Actor for his role in the movie Wild Romance.

== Selected filmography ==
Film
Year	Title	Role	Notes
1996	Punk Lawyer	Pixley	
2000	Total Loss		
2004	Simon	Camiel Vrolijk	
2004	06/05	Wester	
2005	Medea	Matthijs	
2007	Timboektoe	Jean	
2010	The Happy Housewife	Beau	
2010	Fuchsia the Mini-Witch	Oom Rogier	
2011	Sonny Boy	Willem	
2012	De Marathon	Nico	
2015	Bloed, zweet & tranen	John Kraaijkamp Sr.	
2016	In My Father's Garden	Jozef Mieras	

Television
Year	Title	Role	Notes
2016	Notruf Hafenkante – Freiheit	Til Schilling	
2016	Tokyo Trial	Bert Röling	
