= The Happy Housewife =

2010 film

- Theatrical release poster
- Directed by: Antoinette Beumer
- Written by: Marnie Blok; Karin van Holst Pellekaan
- Based on: The Happy Housewife by Heleen van Royen
- Produced by: Bert Nijdam; Ronald van Wechem; Hans de Weers
- Starring: Carice van Houten; Waldemar Torenstra; Marcel Hensema
- Cinematography: Bert Pot
- Edited by: Annelien van Wijnbergen
- Music by: Tom Holkenborg
- Production companies: Eyeworks; Inspire Pictures; RTL Entertainment
- Distributed by: Benelux Film Distributors
- Release date: 12 April 2010 (Amsterdam)
- Running time: 100 minutes
- Country: Netherlands
- Language: Dutch
- Budget: €1.8 million
- Box office: $4.8 million

The Happy Housewife (Dutch: De gelukkige huisvrouw) is a 2010 Dutch drama film directed by Antoinette Beumer. It stars Carice van Houten as Lea, a housewife who has trouble adjusting to the birth of her son.

The film received a Platinum Film for 400.000 visitors.

== Release ==
The film was released on DVD and Blu-ray on 29 September 2010.
