= De Marathon =

2012 film

- Theatrical release poster
- Directed by: Diederick Koopal
- Screenplay by: Martin van Waardenberg; Gerard Meuldijk
- Produced by: Hans de Weers
- Starring: Stefan de Walle; Frank Lammers; Marcel Hensema; Martin van Waardenberg; Mimoun Oaïssa
- Cinematography: Jeroen de Bruin
- Edited by: Marc Bechtold; Brian Ent
- Music by: Melcher Meirmans; Merlijn Snitker
- Production companies: Eyeworks; Inspire Pictures; RTL Entertainment
- Distributed by: Benelux Film Distributors
- Release date: 18 October 2012
- Running time: 107 minutes
- Country: Netherlands
- Language: Dutch
- Box office: $3,281,734

De Marathon is a 2012 Dutch comedy drama film directed by Diederick Koopal.

== Plot ==
Gerard is a car garage owner in Rotterdam. He works there with his friends Kees, Nico and Leo. The Egyptian Youssoef also works in the garage. Nico notices some odd papers in Gerard's office. It turns out that garage has big financial problems, which Gerard did not want the others to know about. Later Youssoef tells his colleagues that he used to be a marathon runner, and made a decent living from it from sponsorships, before he got his foot injured. The men decide they want to participate in the yearly Rotterdam Marathon to get rid of their debts. Their attempts to secure a sponsorship do not succeed however. After a visit to the hospital, Gerard learns that he has terminal cancer. He does not want anyone of his friends and family to know because he want life to go on as normal. The men convince Youssoef to get them in touch with his uncle and old sponsor, Houssein. Gerard makes a deal: if he, Kees, Nico and Leo all finish the marathon, they get €40,000, enough to pay their debts. If they don't, Houssein gets the car garage. The next six months they train for the marathon, and Youssoef becomes their coach. Each of them has difficulty adapting to the new lifestyle without beer, smoking and pastries, as well as their dealing with their own personal problems. After they fail to show up to a race in Amsterdam, Youssoef almost quits. The men apologise and become more strict in their training. On the day of the marathon everyone is present. Kees, Nico and Leo finish it without any major problems, but Gerard falls behind due to his cancer and collapses a short distance before the finish line. He later dies in the hospital. This is the first time that any of his friends learn that he had cancer, eventually deciding to sneak his dead body out of the hospital and push him over the finish line in a wheelchair. The film ends with the remaining friends still working at the garage, with Gerard's teenage son joining them as a new mechanic while Gerard's ashes sit in a jar against the wall.

== Cast ==
- Stefan de Walle as Gerard
- Frank Lammers as Kees
- Marcel Hensema as Nico
- Martin van Waardenberg as Leo
- Mimoun Oaïssa as Youssoef
- Loes Luca as Hannie
- Annet Malherbe as Nel
- Georgina Verbaan as Anita
- Ariane Schluter as Lenie
