= Antoinette Beumer =

Dutch film director

- Born: Antoinette Janssen; 1962 (age 62–63); Nieuwer-Amstel, North Holland, Netherlands
- Occupation: Film director
- Years active: 1991–present
- Children: 2
- Relatives: Marjolein Beumer (sister); Famke Janssen (sister)

Antoinette Beumer (born Janssen; 1962) is a Dutch film director. She is notable for having directed the 2010 films The Happy Housewife and Loft.

== Biography ==
Beumer was born as Antoinette Janssen in Nieuwer-Amstel, North Holland, the Netherlands. She is the sister of actresses Marjolein Beumer and Famke Janssen.

== Filmography ==
=== Director ===
- Rendez-Vous (2015)
- Soof (2013)
- Jackie (2012)
- Loft (2010)
- The Happy Housewife (2010)
- See You in Vegas (2007)

== Writing ==
Beumer's first novel, Mijn vader is een vliegtuig (2018), was awarded the Hebban Debuutprijs. The novel is partly autobiographical, about growing up with a father who has mental health problems.
