= Ivoren Wachters =

Ivoren Wachters (film)
- Directed by: Dana Nechushtan
- Written by: Theo Nijland
- Starring: Stijn Westenend
- Release date: 1998
- Country: Netherlands
- Language: Dutch

Ivoren Wachters is a 1998 Dutch film directed by Dana Nechushtan. The film was made for television, and is based on the 1951 novel by Simon Vestdijk.

== Cast ==
- Stijn Westenend
- Cees Geel
- Gwen Eckhaus
- Roef Ragas
- Carice van Houten
- Elvira Out
- Rop Verheijen

== Reception ==
CineMagazine rated the film 3.5 stars.
