= Jackie (2012 film) =

- Theatrical release poster
- Directed by: Antoinette Beumer
- Written by: Marnie Blok; Karin van Holst Pellekaan
- Produced by: Hans de Weers; Ronald van Wechem
- Starring: Carice van Houten; Jelka van Houten; Holly Hunter
- Cinematography: Danny Elsen
- Edited by: Marc Bechtold
- Music by: Melcher Meirmans; Merlijn Snitker; Chrisnanne Wiegel
- Distributed by: Benelux Film Distributors
- Release date: 10 May 2012
- Running time: 100 minutes
- Country: Netherlands
- Languages: Dutch; English

Jackie is a 2012 Dutch comedy-drama film directed by Antoinette Beumer, from an idea by Marnie Block and Karen van Holst Pellekaan. The leading roles are played by Carice van Houten, her real-life sister Jelka van Houten and Academy Award winner Holly Hunter.

== Plot ==
Sofie (Carice van Houten) and Daan (Jelka van Houten) are twin sisters who were raised by two fathers (Paul Hoes and Jaap Spijkers). When they get a phone call from America that their biological mother, Jackie (Holly Hunter) is in a hospital with a complicated leg fracture awaiting transfer to a rehabilitation center, the two end up in an adventure where everything they believed in is called into question. This results in an unforgettable journey to New Mexico with the strange and inappropriate Jackie where the lives of the two sisters will change forever.

== Cast ==
- Carice van Houten as Sophie
- Jelka van Houten as Daan, Sophie's twin sister
- Holly Hunter as Jackie, Sophie & Daan's biological mother
- Jaap Spijkers as Harm, Sophie & Daan's father
- Paul Hoes as Marcel, Sophie & Daan's father
- Jeroen Spitzenberger as Joost, Daan's husband
- Hajo Bruins as Robert, Sophie's boss
- Elise Schaap as Rosa, one of Sophie's co-workers
- Howe Gelb sa Paul
