= Duska (film) =

- Directed by: Jos Stelling
- Written by: Hans Heesen; Jos Stelling
- Produced by: Hans de Weers; Reinout Oerlemans; Hans de Wolf
- Distributed by: Benelux Film Distributors
- Release date: 4 October 2007
- Running time: 90 minutes
- Country: The Netherlands
- Languages: Dutch, Russian

Duska (Russian: Душка) is a 2007 Dutch film directed by Jos Stelling. It was the Netherlands' submission to the 80th Academy Awards for the Academy Award for Best Foreign Language Film, but was not accepted as a nominee. At the Netherlands Film Festival, where it was the opening film Sylvia Hoeks won the Best Supporting Actress Golden Calf for her role as a cashier, while composer Bart van de Lisdonk was nominated for Best Music.

== Plot ==
A socially inept middle-aged man is confronted with an unexpected guest even more clueless than himself in this comedy-drama. Bob (Gene Bervoets) is a film critic from the Netherlands who loves and understands the movies but doesn't have the same knack with the real world, especially the opposite sex. Bob is deeply infatuated with a woman (Sylvia Hoeks) who works at the popcorn counter of his favorite movie theater, but while she sometimes flirts with him, he's too nervous to follow through. Bob decides he needs to be more bold if he wants to win his dream girl, but just as he's gathering his courage to lure her back to his apartment, he suddenly finds himself entertaining an unexpected guest. Duska (Sergei Makovetsky) is an even geekier movie buff Bob met at a film festival in Russia, and he's decided to take him up on his offer to let him stay at his flat if he's ever in town. While Duska is cramping the style Bob is trying to develop, the larger problem is that his new houseguest seems to be planning a long-term visit and Bob doesn't know how to get rid of him.

== Reception ==
Duska has an approval rating of 20% on review aggregator website Rotten Tomatoes, based on 5 reviews, and an average rating of 5.3/10.

== See also ==
- Cinema of the Netherlands
- List of Dutch submissions for the Academy Award for Best Foreign Language Film
- List of submissions to the 80th Academy Awards for Best Foreign Language Film
