= Tim Haars =

Dutch actor (born 1981)

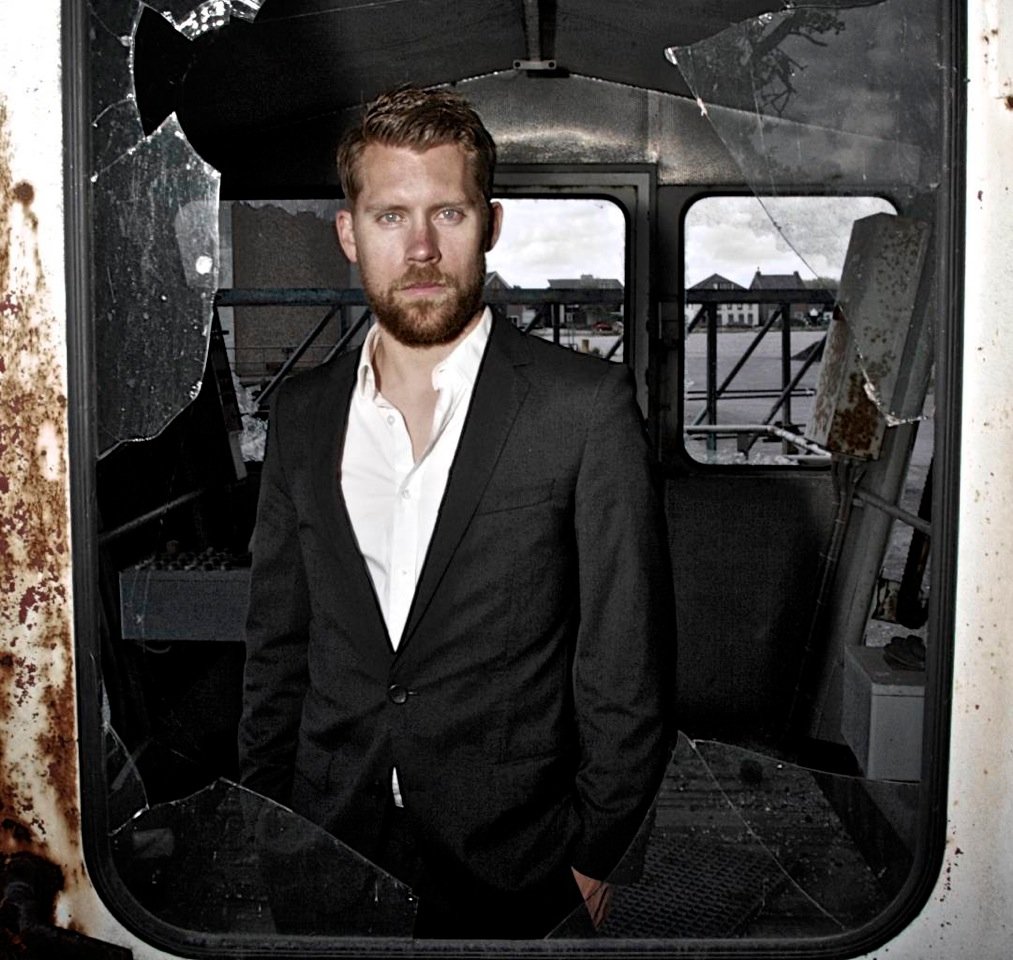
- Haars in 2013
- Born: 6 November 1981 (age 44) 's-Hertogenbosch, Netherlands
- Occupation: Actor
- Years active: 2008-present

Tim Haars (born 6 November 1981 in 's-Hertogenbosch, Netherlands) is a Dutch actor and presenter. He appeared in more than twenty films since 2008.

== Selected filmography ==
Year	Title	Role
2010	New Kids Turbo	Gerrie van Boven
2011	New Kids Nitro	Gerrie van Boven
2013	Bros Before Hos	Max
2017	Ron Goossens, Low Budget Stuntman	Ron Goossens
