= Hans de Weers =

Dutch television- and film producer (born 1966)

- Born: 17 April 1966
- Education: University of Amsterdam
- Occupations: Film producer, Television producer
- Years active: 27
- Notable work: Antonia's Line; Oysters at Nam Kee's; Stricken; The Happy Housewife; New Kids Turbo

Hans de Weers (Dutch pronunciation: [ˈɦɑnz də ˈʋeːrs]; 17 April 1966) is a Dutch television- and film producer. Apart from box office hits like Oysters at Nam Kee's and New Kids Turbo he is most notable for producing the film Antonia's Line that enjoyed critical success and several awards, including the Academy Award for Best Foreign Language Film at the 68th Academy Awards.

== Selected filmography ==
=== Feature films ===
- Oude Tongen (1994)
- Antonia's Line (1995)
- The Stowaway (1997)
- House of America (1997)
- Mariken (2000)
- Nynke (2001)
- Oysters at Nam Kee's (2002)
- Erik of het klein insectenboek (2004)
- Johan (2005)
- Duska (2007)
- De Brief voor de Koning (2008)
- Stricken (2009)
- The Happy Housewife (2010)
- Dik Trom (2010)
- New Kids Turbo (2010)
- Nova Zembla (2011)
- New Kids Nitro (2011)
- Jackie (2012)
- De Marathon (2012)
- The Dinner (2013)
- The Surprise (2015)
- Hotel de grote L (2017)
- Tulipani, Love, Honour and a Bicycle (2017)
- La Holandesa (2017)
- Believe the Movie (announced)

=== Television films ===
- De Trein van zes uur tien (1999)
- Maten (1999)
- Ochtendzwemmers (2001)
- De ordening (2003)
- Bluebird (2004)
- De Overloper (2012)

=== Television series ===
- Meiden van de Wit (2002 – 2005, 36 episodes)
- Flikken Maastricht (2007 – 2012, 41 episodes)
- Dokter Deen (2012 – 2018, 34 episodes)
- Tokyo Trial (2017, 4 episodes)
