= Dik Trom (film) =

2010 film by Arne Toonen

- Theatrical release poster
- Directed by: Arne Toonen
- Written by: Mischa Alexander; Wijo Koek
- Produced by: Hans de Weers
- Starring: Michael Nierse; Marcel Musters; Eva Van Der Gucht; Loes Haverkort; Thijs Römer
- Cinematography: Jeroen de Bruin
- Edited by: Marc Bechtold; Brian Ent
- Production companies: Eyeworks Film & TV Drama NV
- Distributed by: Benelux Film Distributors
- Release date: 24 November 2010
- Running time: 85 minutes
- Country: Netherlands
- Language: Dutch
- Box office: $3,976,432

Dik Trom is a 2010 Dutch film directed by Arne Toonen. It is based on the characters of the Dik Trom book series, although it features a different story. The film was released to theatres in the Netherlands on 24 November 2010.

== Plot ==
Dik Trom lives with his parents Ma and Pa Trom in the town of Dikkedam. People living there enjoy eating large amounts of food and are overweight. Dik enjoys life in Dikkedam and wins a diving tournament. Soon, Pa, who dreams of opening his own restaurant, gets an opportunity to do so in Dunhoven. The family moves to the new town as a result but find that people there are fond of exercising and conscious about their diet and weight, making the family stand out. They prepare the new restaurant, which is located beside a gym owned by the fitness trainer Dolf. He gives the family free trial passes to his new gym and tells them they could benefit from exercise. That evening, the family celebrates with a large meal in honour of their new restaurant.

The next day, Dik starts his first day of school, where he is judged because of his name and weight. During break, Dik finds a smaller boy named Sjak being bullied by Viktor and his friends. Dik defends Sjak while Viktor vows to get revenge. Dik and Sjak quickly become friends, and the two help advertise the restaurant together. Dik soon notices Lieve, a thin girl who is the daughter of Sonja, a famous dietician. Dik invites Lieve to his restaurant. She does not accept but is secretly interested in the food. During the restaurant's grand opening, the family waits for customers to arrive, but none show up, while Dolf's gym is crowded with residents. Eventually, Sonja and Dunhoven's mayor arrive. They believe that the food they serve is hazardous and should be closed, with the mayor insisting they use alternate ingredients.

Soon, Dik and Sjak notice an advertisement for Dunhoven's annual summer games. Viktor asks Lieve whether she would compete while crushing on her, which disgusts Lieve. Dik laughs at the attempt, prompting Viktor to insult him. Dik decides to register for the games and challenge him. Meanwhile, the restaurant goes through multiple changes, with Ma stating that the family will have to adapt to life in Dunhoven by following their strict lifestyle to allow the restaurant to function.

In school, Dik secretly gives Lieve sweets disguised as vegetables, which were prepared by Pa. The whole restaurant menu is revised with healthy alternatives and fill up with customers, but Pa is disappointed that his business was not what he was going for. Viktor becomes suspicious of Dik and Lieve's friendship; he threatens her if she doesn't become his girlfriend, which Lieve reluctantly accepts. This upsets Dik and makes him believe that he is ugly because he is fat. This prompts Pa to change the restaurant to what it was like before, while Ma starts exercising and visiting Dolf's gym. Dik still fears that eating high-calorie foods will make him even larger. In the restaurant, Pa decides to deceive the customers by secretly cooking them real hamburgers, in which they enjoy. Sonja and Lieve arrive. Initially fooled, the two soon find out the secret, making everybody panic and rush out. Following this, the representatives show up to close the restaurant. Pa pleads for a final chance by selling his hotdogs to the crowd at the summer games, which they agree to.

At the summer games, Viktor celebrates his victories against his opponents, while Lieve receives perfects scores. Dik stays at home, having withdrawn from the event. A deliveryman shows up at the door and asks Dik to sign for a package. Dik discovers that the man is Lieve's father, who has not seen her for years. Dik rushes him to the games and introduces him to Lieve. Following his claim that he never left because of her size. Lieve turns against Sonja and eats one of Pa's hotdogs in front of the crowd, which gradually attracts more members. Dolf believes that they are pigs, with Ma stating to him that she'd rather be happy.

The representatives allow the restaurant to remain open. Ma reunites with her family, Lieve ends her relationship with Viktor, Lieve's father returns to her, and Dik continues with their relationship together.
