= Den Dungen =

- Village
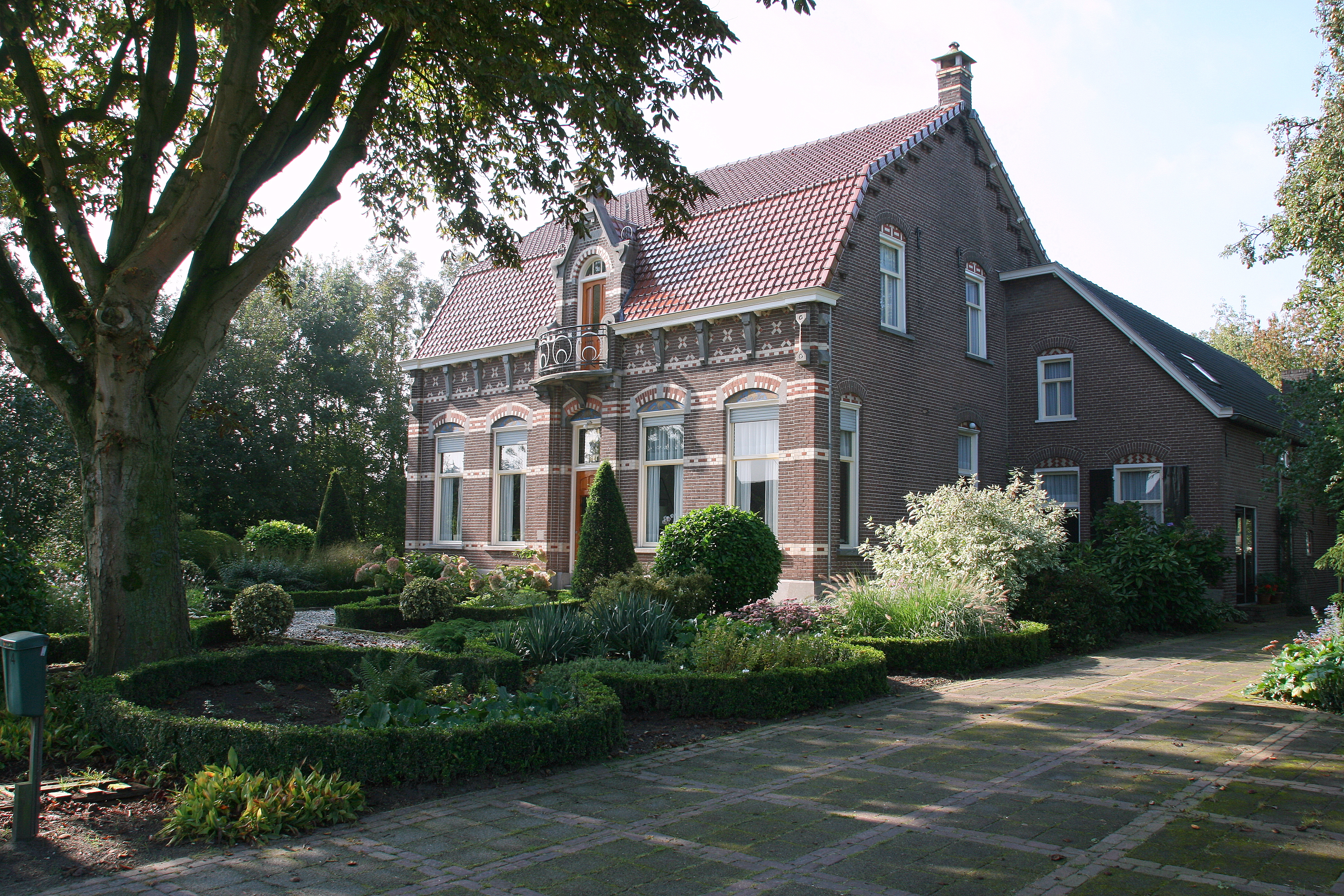
- House in Den Dungen

- Flag Coat of arms

- Location in the province of North Brabant in the Netherlands Den Dungen (Netherlands)
- Coordinates: 51°39′55″N 5°22′17″E
- Country: Netherlands
- Province: North Brabant
- Municipality: Sint-Michielsgestel

Area
  - Total: 1.50 km^{2} (0.58 sq mi)
- Elevation: 6 m (20 ft)

Population (2021)
  - Total: 3,725
  - Density: 2,480/km^{2} (6,430/sq mi)
- Time zone: UTC+1 (CET)
  - Summer (DST): UTC+2 (CEST)
- Postal code: 5275
- Dialing code: 073
- Major roads: A2 N279

Den Dungen is a village in the Dutch province of North Brabant. It is located in the municipality of Sint-Michielsgestel next to the village Maaskantje.

== History ==
The village was first mentioned in 1300 as "Super Donghen prope Buscum", and means "sandy hills in swampy land". Den Dungen developed in the Middle Ages on three hills near the Aa River. During the 17th century, a ring dike was built to protect against floods.

The Catholic St.-Jacobus de Meerdere Church was completed in 1533. In 1899, a new tower was constructed with a needle spire. In 1927, the church was expanded.

Den Dungen was home to 1,399 people in 1840. Around 1900, Den Dungen and Maaskantje started to merge into a single urban area. It was a separate municipality until 1996, when it was merged with Sint-Michielsgestel.

Den Dungen is a twin town of Portishead, Somerset in England.

== Gallery ==
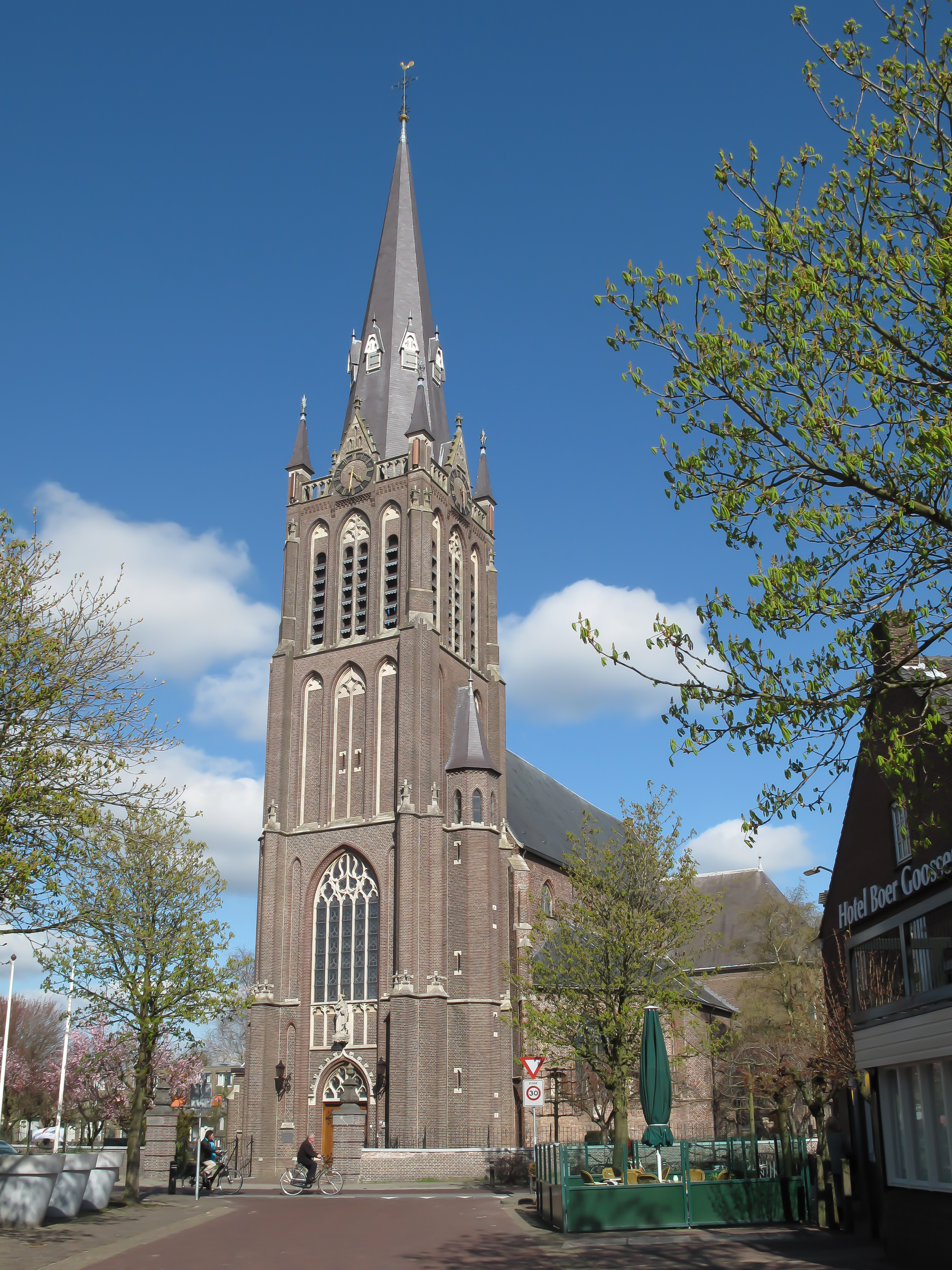
Church in Den Dungen

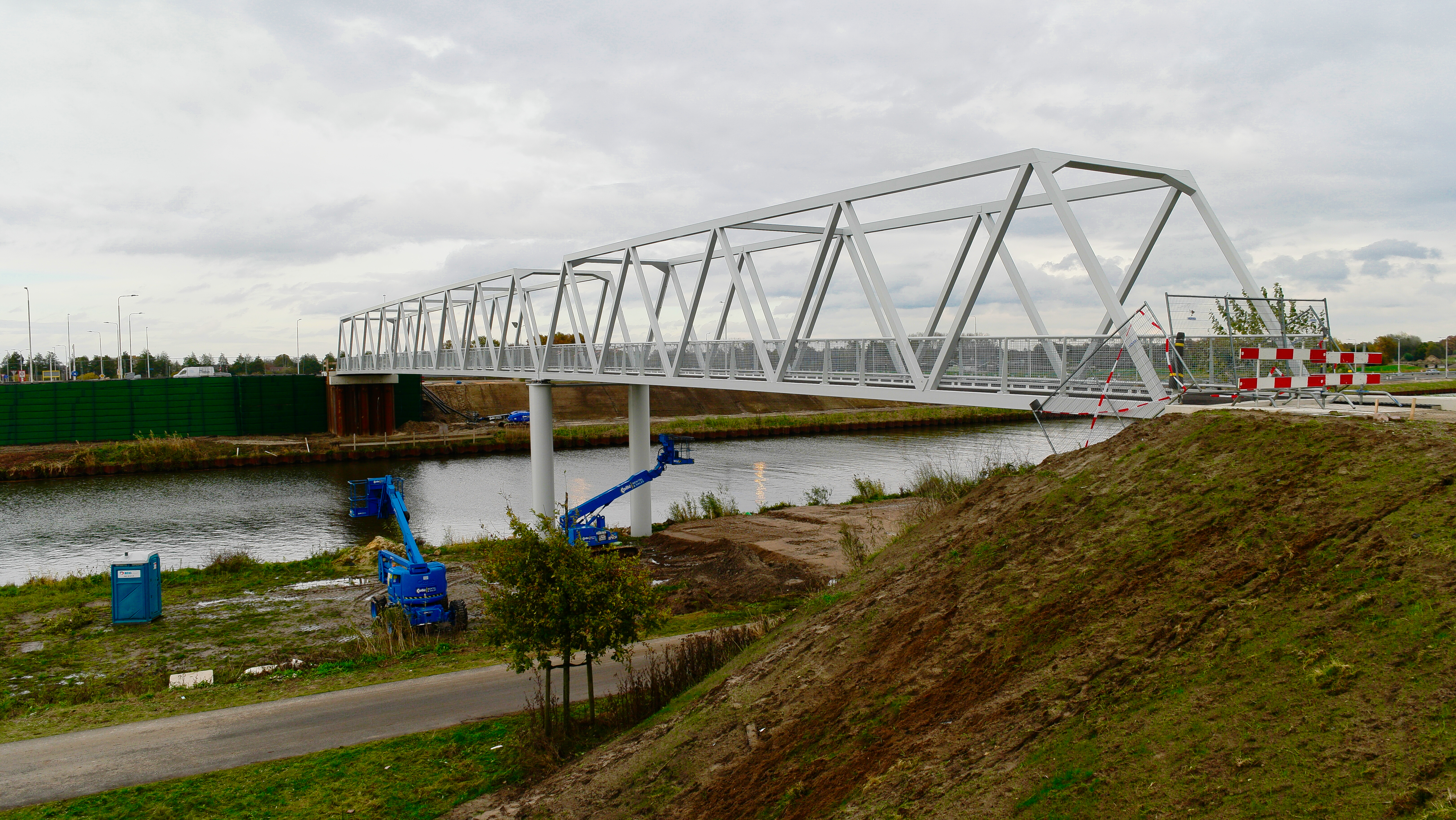
Bicycle bridge

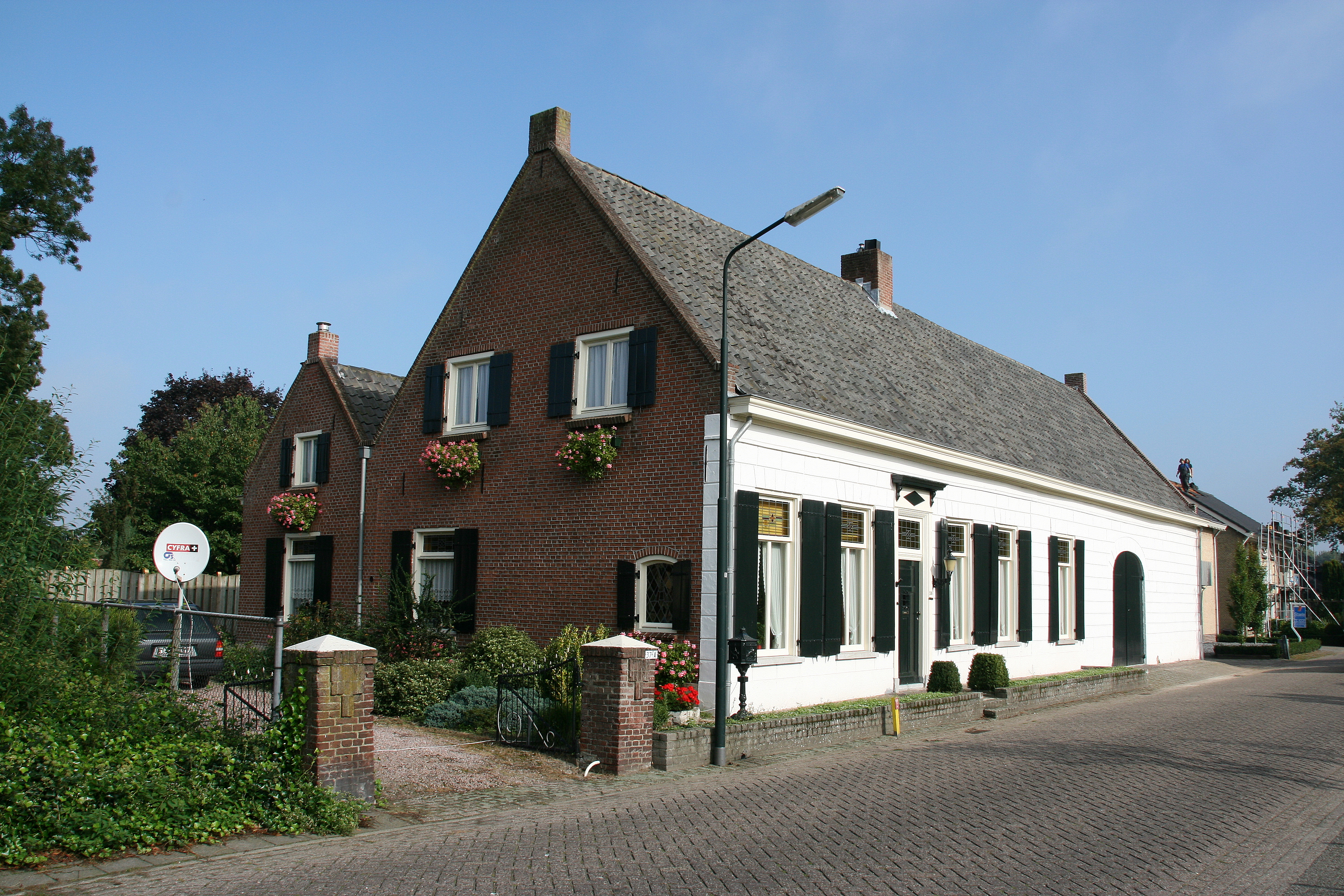
Farm in Den Dungen

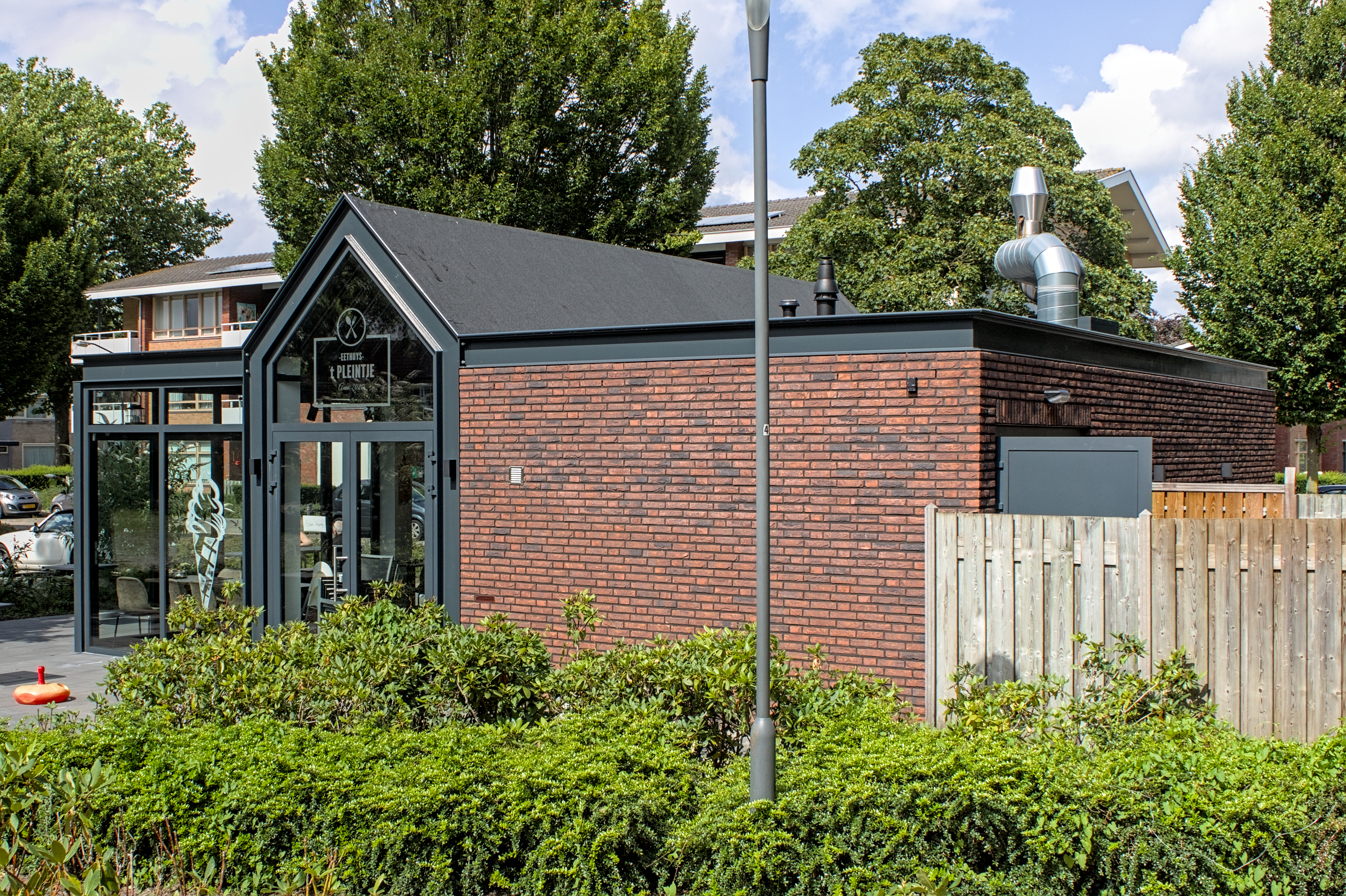
Snackbar in Den Dungen
