= Maaskantje =

- Village
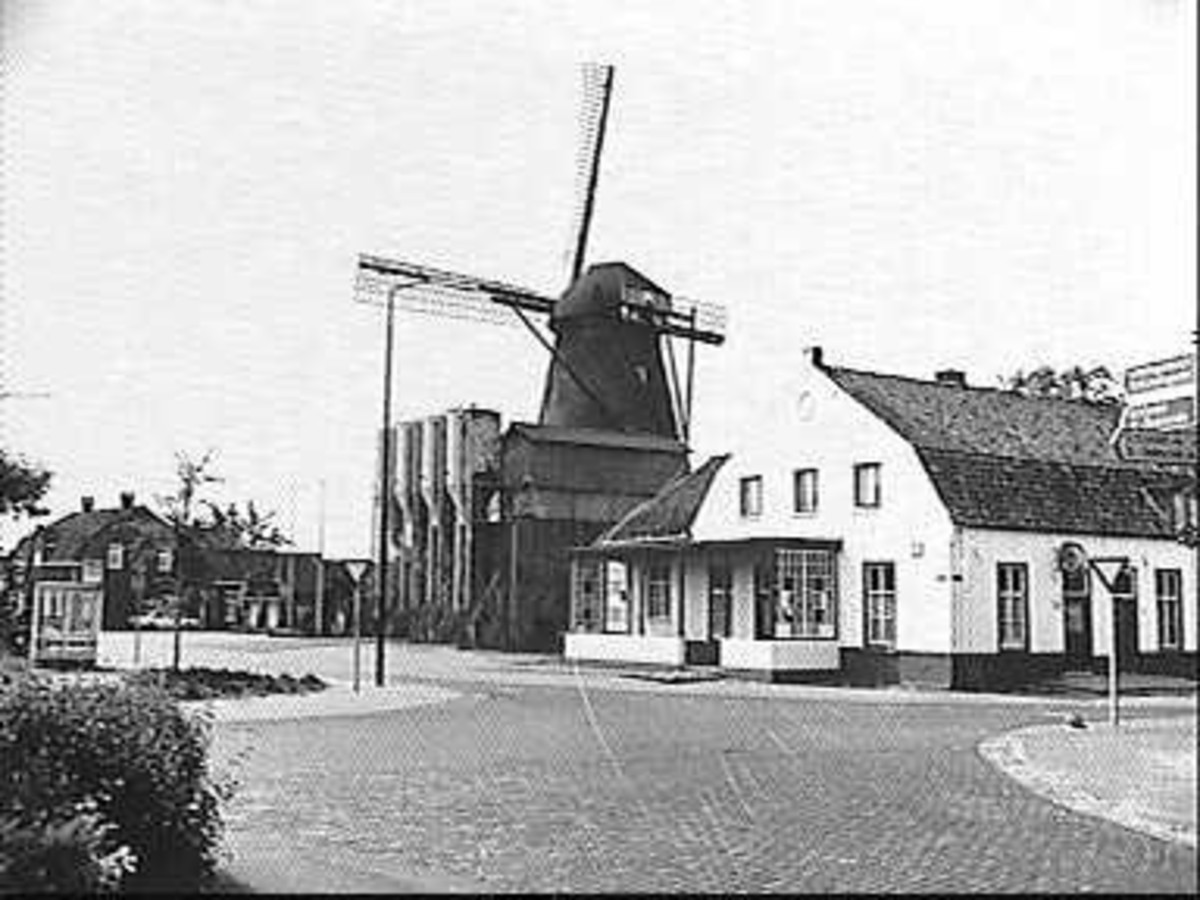
- Maaskantje in 1981

- Location in the province of North Brabant in the Netherlands Maaskantje (Netherlands)
- Coordinates: 51°39′31″N 5°22′18″E
- Country: Netherlands
- Province: North Brabant
- Municipality: Sint-Michielsgestel

Area
  - Total: 2.86 km^{2} (1.10 sq mi)
- Elevation: 6 m (20 ft)

Population (2017)
  - Total: 1,830
  - Density: 640/km^{2} (1,660/sq mi)
- Time zone: UTC+1 (CET)
  - Summer (DST): UTC+2 (CEST)
- Postal code: 5271
- Dialing code: 073

Maaskantje (Dutch pronunciation: [ˈmaːskɑɲtɕə]) is a village in the province of North Brabant, Netherlands. The village is part of the municipality of Sint-Michielsgestel, southeast of 's-Hertogenbosch.

== History ==
The village was first mentioned in 1750 as "nabij het Maaskantje te Gestel", and means "near the mud".

Maaskantje was home to 424 people in 1840. Around 1900, Maaskantje and Den Dungen started to merge into a single urban area. Before 1996, Maaskantje was part of the municipality of Den Dungen instead of the municipality of Sint-Michielsgestel. In 1996, Den Dungen became part of Sint-Michielsgestel.

== New Kids ==
The Dutch Comedy Central sketch show New Kids that takes place in the village has generated tourism to the village. The main characters of the series pose in front of the Maaskantje town sign in most of the sketches. Some of the skits were also filmed locally, most in the neighboring village of Den Dungen. The music video for Friends Turbo by the dance band Scooter was filmed in the village.

Due to the popularity of the films and skits, the place has become a popular destination for fans of the New Kids. The village's signs were stolen by New Kids fans and the municipality decided not to replace them.
