= Warner Bros. International Television Production Netherlands =

Dutch film and television production company

- Logo used since 2023

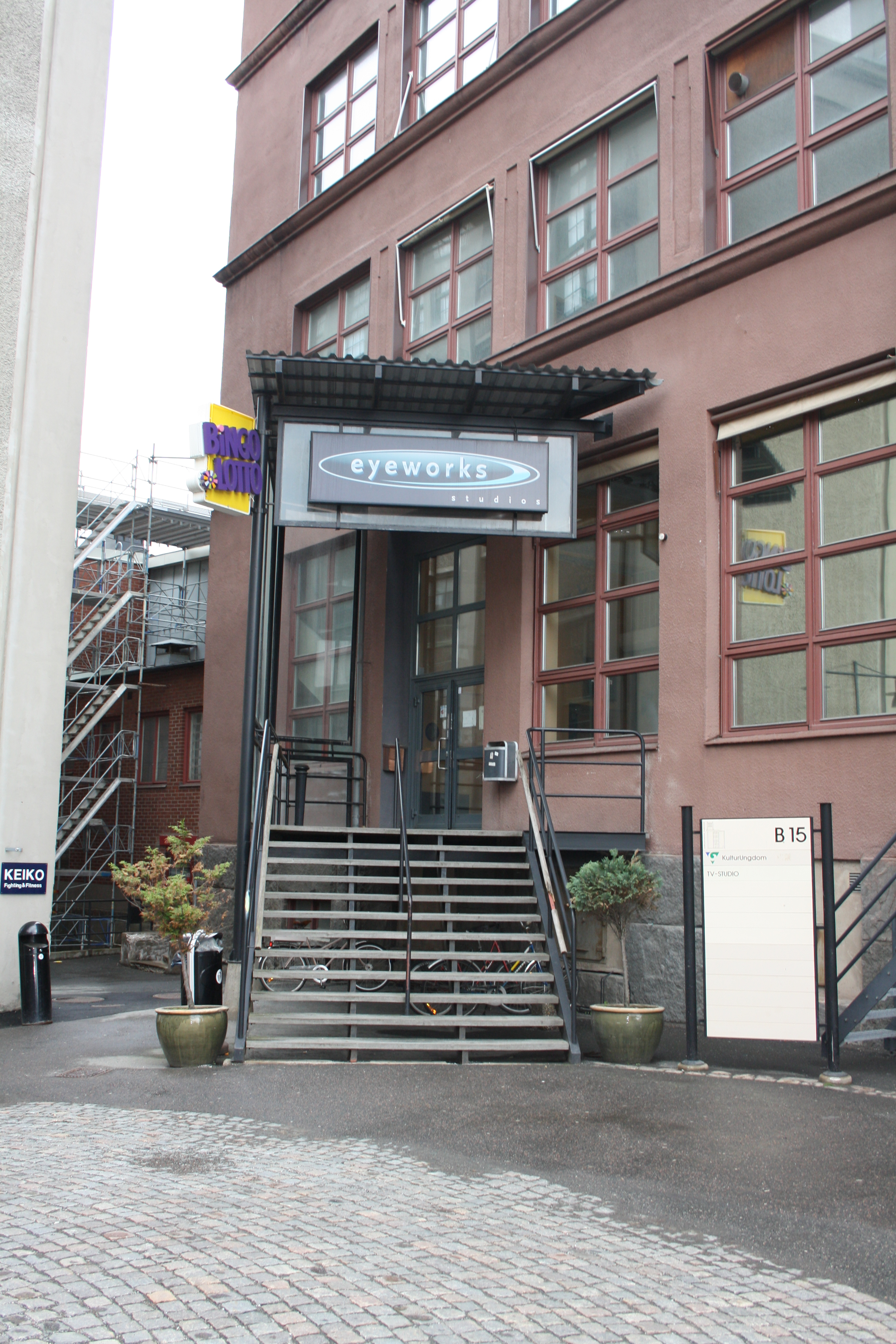
- Eyeworks in Gothenburg, Sweden
- Formerly: Eyeworks (1981–2014)
- Type: Subsidiary
- Industry: Television production
- Founded: 1981; 45 years ago
- Founders: Reinout Oerlemans; Robert van den Bogaard; Ronald van Wechem
- Headquarters: Amsterdam, Netherlands
- Owner: Skydance Corporation
- Parent: Warner Bros. International Television Production (2014–present)
- Website: wbitvpnetherlands.com

Warner Bros. International Television Production Netherlands (WBITVP Netherlands), formerly known as Eyeworks, is an Amsterdam-based international television production company founded by Reinout Oerlemans, Robert van den Bogaard and Ronald van Wechem. As of June 2014, it is a wholly owned subsidiary of the Warner Bros. Television Group and rebranded as Warner Bros. International Television Production.

== History ==
On February 26, 2003, Eyeworks had announced it had acquired a 45% stake in RTL Television's Cologne-based subsidiary Stormy Entertainment and was being renamed to StormyEyeworks GmbH with RTL retaining their 45 percent stake in the rebranded company.

In January 2005, Eyeworks announced that they've acquired Dutch sports production company that was also based in Netherlands named WK Productions, marking their expansion into the sports genre with WK Productions founders Kees Jansma and Will Moerer continued to work for the company under Eyeworks.

In October 2005, Eyeworks had announced that they've acquired two of Belgium's leading television production companies MMG and Pics. Eyeworks also announced that they've expanded their Swedish operations by acquiring Nova TV.

On February 8, 2006, Eyeworks acquired New Zealand production company Touchdown Television.

In September 2006, Eyeworks announced that they've expanded their drama production activities by acquiring Dutch drama production company Egmond Film & Television expanding Eyeworks's Dutch operations with Egmond Film & Television being incorporated into Eyeworks and had the company renamed to Eyeworks Egmond with Egmond's CEO Hans de Weer continued to be remained on board under Eyeworks. Two weeks later on the 24th of that same month, Eyeworks announced that they've expanded their operation into the United States by acquiring a 50% stake in American television production company 3 Ball Productions.

In August 2007 after expanding their European and American operations, Eyeworks had announced that they've further expanding their operations into the Spanish-language markets Spain and Latin America by acquiring Spanish-Argentine based production company Cuatro Cabezas with their founders and CEOs of Cuartro Cabezas Diego Guebel and Mario Pergolini continued to work with the acquired company which will be renamed to Eyeworks Cuatro Cabezas, marking Eyeworks first expansion outside of Europe.

In June 2008, Eyeworks announced that they've acquired Danish and Polish independent production company Easy Film and was being renamed to Eyeworks Denmark and Eyeworks Poland, expanding Eyeworks' Scandinavian operations and their first entry into the Danish and Polish television industry.

In October 2008, Eyeworks announced that they've acquired German TV drama and film production company Cologne-Gemini Film and will interrogate it into Eyeworks' German division Eyeworks Germany rebranding it as Eyeworks Cologne-Gemini.

In September 2010, Eyeworks announced that they've expanded their Scandinavian operations into Norway by acquiring a majority stake in Norwegian independent production company named Dinamo Story from its parent company Dinamo Norge AS and had it renamed to Eyeworks Dinamo.

On March 22, 2013, Eyeworks announced they will move their headquarters to the HES building in center Amsterdam. The HES building began serving as the headquarters in summer 2013. The new headquarters was later opened on September 5, 2013.

In July 2013, Eyeworks announced that they've expanding their operations into Finland by acquiring Finnish production company Nordisk Film TV Finland from MRP and rebranding them as their Finnish division named Eyeworks Finland with Nordisk executive Antti Vaisanen becoming their managing director of the rebranded company.

In January 2014, Warner Bros. International Television Production the international television division of Warner Bros. Television had announced that they were in exclusive negotiations to acquire Dutch international production group Eyeworks. A month later on February 11 of that same year, Warner Bros. International Television Production and their parent company Warner Bros. Television Group announced that they had made an agreement to purchase Dutch international production group Eyeworks and their businesses outside of the United States to expand Warner Bros.' international television production operations overseas. The deal could also bring Warner Bros. International Television Productions to other countries and would launch local operations in those countries but it will exclude Eyeworks' American division Eyeworks USA which will become independent along with founder and CEO of Eyeworks Reinout Oerlemans will step down after the purchase. Four months later in June of that same year, Warner Bros. International Television Production and their parent company Warner Bros. Television Group had announced that they've completed their acquisition of Dutch international production group Eyeworks and its international operations outside the US expanding Warner Bros. International Television Production's operations and their TV production units into 13 additional countries with Warner Bros. taking over Eyeworks' international distribution activities along with founder and CEO Reinout Oerlemans exited Eyeworks. Eyeworks' American division Eyeworks USA had been split from its parent company Eyeworks and had turned into an independent production company with former founder and CEO of Eyeworks Reinout Oerlemans moved to the United States and taken over Eyeworks' independent American division.

== Companies ==
=== Eyeworks UK ===
Eyeworks UK (formerly At It Productions) is a British TV production company set up in 1997 by Martin Cunning and Chris Fouracre. At It are predominantly linked with youth and entertainment shows (it is a major supplier of music programmes to Channel 4), but over the last three years have branched out into a series of other fields such as sensationalised medical documentaries and quiz shows. In July 2007, the company was bought by International production group Eyeworks. In April 2014, ITV produced Amazing Greys – a co production between ITV Studios & Eyeworks.

The company is currently headed by Chris Fouracre (MD), Martin Cunning (MD), Lee-Anne Richardson (Head of Production) Paul Day (Director of Branded Content) and Rebecca Ackland (Head of International).

=== Eyeworks Touchdown ===
Eyeworks Touchdown (formerly Touchdown Television) is a New Zealand-based television production company founded in 1991 by Julie Christie that specializes in entertainment, lifestyle, sport and factual series, and reality game shows. Among programs Touchdown produced are How Normal Are You?, So You Wannabe a Popstar, and Miss Popularity, among others. On February 8, 2006, Eyeworks acquired Touchdown and it was later renamed to Eyeworks Touchdown on April 1, 2006.

=== Eyeworks Cuatro Cabezas ===
Cuatro Cabezas (meaning Four Heads in English and a.k.a. 4K) was founded in 1993 by Diego Guebel and Mario Pergolini. In 2008, Mario Pergolini sold all his shares of the company for the Dutch production company Eyeworks, so from then on it has been called Eyeworks Cuatro Cabezas.

=== Eyeworks Egmond ===
On September 10, 2006, Egmond Film & Television was acquired by Eyeworks and was renamed to Eyeworks Egmond.

=== Eyeworks Brazil ===
In 2011, the company took the original name of the branch from outside, at Brazil exhibition, and called then Eyeworks.
