= Golden Calf Occupation Award =

Dutch film award

The following is a list of winners of the Golden Calf Occupation Award (also known as the Golden Calf Professionals Award) of the Netherlands Film Festival. In 2003, the category was split up into separate categories for Best Production Design, Best Sound Design, Best Music, Best Editing and Best Camera.

Main Winners
Year	Person	Occupation
2002	Rikke Jelier; Alfred Schaaf	production design
2001	Henny Vrienten	music
2000	Piotr van Dijk	sound
1999	Rogier Stoffers	camera
1998	Menno Boerema	montage
1997	Alfred Schaaf; Rikke Jelier	art direction
1996	Henny Vrienten	music
1995	Jan Blokker	script
1994	Jan van Sandwijk	sound
1993	Goert Giltay	camera
1992	Ot Louw	editing
1991	Jan Roelfs; Ben van Os	art direction
1990	Loek Dikker	music
1989	Gerard Soeteman	script
1988	Tom Tholen	sound
1987	Theo van de Sande	camera
1986	Jos van der Linden	production
1985	Edgar Burcksen	editing
1984	Dick Schillemans	art direction
1983	George Sluizer	script
1982	Kees Linthorst	sound

Other Winners
Person	Occupation
Theo van de Sande	camera
Hans van Dongen	montage
Willem Breuker	muziek
Pjotr van Dijk	geluid
