= Phileine Says Sorry =

2003 Dutch film

- Theatrical release poster
- Directed by: Robert Jan Westdijk
- Written by: Robert Jan Westdijk
- Based on: Phileine zegt sorry by Ronald Giphart
- Produced by: Frans van Gestel; Jeroen Beker; San Fu Maltha
- Starring: Kim van Kooten; Michiel Huisman; Hadewych Minis; Tara Elders
- Cinematography: Bert Pot
- Edited by: Peter Alderliesten
- Music by: Richard Cameron
- Production companies: Motel Films; Fu Works; BNN TV
- Distributed by: A-Film Distribution (Netherlands); Cinéart (Belgium)
- Release dates: 24 September 2003 (NFF); 9 October 2003 (Netherlands)
- Running time: 95 minutes
- Countries: Netherlands; United States; Belgium
- Languages: Dutch; English
- Budget: €4 million
- Box office: €2,3 million

Phileine Says Sorry (Dutch: Phileine zegt sorry) is a 2003 Dutch romantic comedy written and directed by Robert Jan Westdijk and stars Kim van Kooten, Michiel Huisman, Hadewych Minis and Tara Elders. It is based on the novel of the same name by Ronald Giphart. The story follows Phileine who goes after her boyfriend who travels to New York for a theater production.

== Plot ==
The story is about Phileine (Kim van Kooten) and her actor boyfriend Max (Michiel Huisman). He goes to New York City to improve his acting skills. Later on, without Max knowing it, Phileine also travels to New York.

On the plane, she meets an American couple, Fabian and Lena, who offer to bring her to Max's house. Fabian gives Phileine his phone number to call him during her stay for a tour. Inside Max's house, Phileine meets his friends: the bespectacled Jules, the sick Leonard, the Flemish Gulpje, the terrible Joanna and weatherman LT (Louis Theodore). That same evening, a welcome party is held, but because of all the new impressions, drinks, and fatigue, Phileine goes to bed early.

In the morning, she finds a note from Max that he had to leave early for rehearsal but that the two of them will have dinner together in the evening. Phileine goes to the living room and meets Gulpje. Soon, they decide to be best friends and have lunch. After lunch, Phileine calls Fabian for a tour. During that tour, Fabian gets a little bit too personal so she reminds him that he has a wife.

Max can not make it to diner because his rehearsal runs out. Phileine spends that night with the friends of Max. Together with Gulpje, she stirs the group up because they both like to joke around at the expense of others.

On day two, Phileine attends the premiere of Romeo and Juliet. The play shows the sexual side of society, so it is played naked and shows sex and masturbation scenes. Part of the audience is so shocked that after the break, they call out their displeasure and leave the theater. Phileine is astonished but remains still in her seat until the end.

At the after party, she tries to obtain explanations about what had happened on stage. She asks Max and the director Reginald, but neither gives her an answer. She quarrels with Max but settles the matter later in a pub. The next day, she goes with Gulpje to the restaurant where the scene from “When Harry Met Sally" was filmed. Phileine and Gulpje get the attention of two men and they invite them to their table. They want to show off their tricks and begin gently with panting and moaning. Initially the men find it funny, but when Phileine and Gulpje start screaming, the whole thing gets embarrassing and they run out the restaurant.

A little later the women run into Jules and start a conversation about sexual harassment from men. After an insulting remark by Phileine, Jules departs. Only then does she discover that Jules is not female but male. Phileine goes to meet LT, the boyfriend of 'terrible Joanna', on his boat on the water. They have sex in 'revenge' for the escapade between Joanna and Max on stage.

The next day, they decide to go to the last performance of the show. From the back of the theater, they see that Max is about to penetrate Joanna on stage. This time, Phileine will not let this happen and makes a huge scene by disrupting the play. Max tries to defend his action by explaining it as art. Phileine does not accept this and gets the audience on her side in the argument.

The day after, the newspapers are filled with what happened in the theater and Phileine is requested for a number of TV shows. She goes to David Letterman's show where she takes control over the show and wins the support of the audience. She is provided with money so she can stay the night in a hotel. The next day, Max is at her door to take her to an AIDS Gala of his friend Leonard. She does not want to go with him, so he lifts her up over his shoulder and takes her to a taxi.

The atmosphere between Phileine and the other people is hostile at the Gala. Except for Gulpje, Phileine has offended everybody else. Even Max is furious at her because he finds out she has slept with LT. Eventually Phileine realizes why everyone is mad at her. She gets on the stage and delivers a speech in which she says sorry for the first time in her life to everyone who she has treated rudely. She ends the speech with: "Sorry that I exist."

== Cast ==
- Kim van Kooten as Phileine
- Michiel Huisman as Max
- Hadewych Minis as Gulpje
- Tara Elders as Lala
- Kenan Raven as LT
- Mads Wittermans as Christiaan
- Leona Philippo as Joanna
- Liesbeth Kamerling as Fleur
- Roeland Fernhout as Jules
- Dan Trettel as Cashier

== Production ==
An adaptation of the novel was first announced to be in development in 1997. At the time, film producer Egmond Film and book publisher Podium reached a deal for the film rights. Coming off their acclaimed Little Sister, director Robert Jan Westdijk and screenwriter Jos Driessen were brought in order to adapt the story. The initial estimated budget for the film was set around 3,5 million Dutch guilder.

Like the original novel, significant parts of the story took place in New York City, in the novel they visited various landmarks across the city like Katz's Delicatessen and the Waldorf Astoria Hotel with supporting role for talk show host David Letterman. Due to budgetary reasons and other limitations, they had to change certain scenes including a cameo role for Letterman. Both the Katz and Waldorf were unavailable to the film at, so a hotel in Brussels was used as a substitute for the Waldorf. They had to hire a separate American film crew, following union rules Dutch crewmembers were prohibited from doing any work. Author Ronald Giphart was closely involved and was present for every day of filming which was considered unusual. He wrote a diary for Dutch magazine Viva and was featured in the making-of documentary that would be broadcast by BNN, who were also an investor in the production.

== Release ==
The film had its premiere on September 24, 2003, at the Netherlands Film Festival.

== Reception ==
Phileine Says Sorry was the film with the most nominations at 2003's Netherlands Film Festival where it was nominated for nine categories, including Best Film, Best Direction, Best Screenplay, Best Actress and Best Actor. It received the Golden Film for having drawn over 100,000 visitors.

=== Awards and nominations ===
Year	Award	Category	Recipient(s)	Result	Ref(s).
2003	Netherlands Film Festival	Golden Calf for Best Feature Film	Robert Jan Westdijk; Frans van Gestel; San Fu Maltha; Jeroen Beker	Nominated	
2003	Netherlands Film Festival	Golden Calf for Best Director	Robert Jan Westdijk	Nominated	
2003	Netherlands Film Festival	Golden Calf for Best Script	Robert Jan Westdijk	Nominated	
2003	Netherlands Film Festival	Golden Calf for Best Actor	Michiel Huisman	Nominated	
2003	Netherlands Film Festival	Golden Calf for Best Actress	Kim van Kooten	Won	
2003	Netherlands Film Festival	Golden Calf for Best Editing	Peter Alderliesten	Won	
2003	Netherlands Film Festival	Golden Calf for Best Sound Design	Herman Pieëte	Won	
2003	Netherlands Film Festival	Golden Calf for Best Cinematography	Bert Pot	Won	
2003	Netherlands Film Festival	Golden Calf for Best Production Design	Dimitri Merkoulov	Nominated	
