= List of common film awards categories =

The following is a list of categories of awards commonly awarded through organizations that bestow film awards, including those presented by various films, festivals, and people's awards.

== Best Actor/Best Actress ==
- See Best Actor#Film awards, Best Actress#Film awards, and List of awards for supporting actor#Film.

== Best Screenplay ==
=== Best Adapted Screenplay ===
A "Best Adapted Screenplay" award is generally issued for the best achievement in transferring a written work from another genre, such as a novel or comic book, in whole or in part, to a feature film.

- AACTA Award for Best Adapted Screenplay
- Academy Award for Best Adapted Screenplay
- BAFTA Award for Best Adapted Screenplay
- Canadian Screen Award for Best Adapted Screenplay
- César Award for Best Adaptation
- Golden Horse Award for Best Adapted Screenplay
- Goya Award for Best Adapted Screenplay
- Satellite Award for Best Adapted Screenplay
- Writers Guild of America Award for Best Adapted Screenplay

=== Best Original Screenplay ===
- AACTA Award for Best Original Screenplay
- Academy Award for Best Original Screenplay
- BAFTA Award for Best Original Screenplay
- Canadian Screen Award for Best Original Screenplay
- Golden Horse Award for Best Original Screenplay
- Goya Award for Best Original Screenplay
- Satellite Award for Best Original Screenplay
- Writers Guild of America Award for Best Original Screenplay

== Best Animated Film ==
- Academy Award for Best Animated Feature
- Africa Movie Academy Award for Best Animation
- Annie Award for Best Animated Feature
  - Annie Award for Best Animated Feature – Independent
- Asia Pacific Screen Award for Best Animated Film
- Austin Film Critics Association Award for Best Animated Film
- BAFTA Award for Best Animated Film
- Boston Society of Film Critics Award for Best Animated Film
- César Award for Best Animated Film
- Chicago Film Critics Association Award for Best Animated Film
- Critics' Choice Movie Award for Best Animated Feature
- Dallas–Fort Worth Film Critics Association Award for Best Animated Film
- Detroit Film Critics Society Award for Best Animated Feature
- European Film Award for Best Animated Feature Film
- Florida Film Critics Circle Award for Best Animated Film
- Golden Globe Award for Best Animated Feature Film
- Goya Award for Best Animated Film
- Japan Academy Film Prize for Animation of the Year
- Los Angeles Film Critics Association Award for Best Animated Film
- Mainichi Film Award for Best Animation Film
- National Board of Review Award for Best Animated Film
- National Film Award for Best Animated Film
- New York Film Critics Circle Award for Best Animated Film
- Online Film Critics Society Award for Best Animated Film
- San Diego Film Critics Society Award for Best Animated Film
- San Francisco Bay Area Film Critics Circle Award for Best Animated Feature
- Satellite Award for Best Animated or Mixed Media Feature
- Saturn Award for Best Animated Film
- St. Louis Film Critics Association Award for Best Animated Feature
- Toronto Film Critics Association Award for Best Animated Film
- Washington D.C. Area Film Critics Association Award for Best Animated Feature

== Best Cinematography ==
- AACTA Award for Best Cinematography
- Academy Award for Best Cinematography
- BAFTA Award for Best Cinematography
- Canadian Screen Award for Best Cinematography
- César Award for Best Cinematography
- Golden Horse Award for Best Cinematography
- Filmfare Award for Best Cinematography
- Independent Spirit Award for Best Cinematography
- Magritte Award for Best Cinematography

== Best Costume Design ==
- AACTA Award for Best Costume Design
- Academy Award for Best Costume Design
- BAFTA Award for Best Costume Design
- Canadian Screen Award for Best Costume Design

== Best Director ==
- AACTA Award for Best Direction
- Academy Award for Best Director
- Asia Pacific Screen Award for Best Director
- BAFTA Award for Best Direction
- Canadian Screen Award for Best Director
- César Award for Best Director
- Citra Award for Best Director
- Crystal Simorgh for Best Director
- Empire Award for Best Director
- Empire Award for Best British Director
- European Film Award for Best Director
- Golden Globe Award for Best Director
- Golden Horse Award for Best Director
- Goya Award for Best Director
- Independent Spirit Award for Best Director
- Japan Academy Film Prize for Director of the Year
- Lux Style Award for Best Film Director
- Polish Academy Award for Best Director
- Satellite Award for Best Director
- Saturn Award for Best Director

== Best Film Editing ==
- AACTA Award for Best Editing
- Academy Award for Best Film Editing
- American Cinema Editors
- BAFTA Award for Best Editing
- Canadian Screen Award for Best Editing
- César Award for Best Editing
- Critics' Choice Movie Award for Best Editing
- Genie Award for Best Film Editing
- German Film Prize for Best Editing
- Golden Horse Award for Best Film Editing
- Online Film Critics Society Award for Best Editing
- San Diego Film Critics Society Award for Best Editing
- Satellite Award for Best Editing
- Saturn Award for Best Editing

== Best Foreign Language Film ==
A "Best Foreign Language Film" is generally awarded to a film originating in a country and language different from those where the award is being given.

- Academy Award for Best International Feature Film, until 2020 called Best Foreign Language Film
- BAFTA Award for Best Film Not in the English Language, until 1990 called Best Foreign Language Film
- Golden Globe Award for Best Foreign Language Film
- Japan Academy Film Prize for Outstanding Foreign Language Film
- Golden Eagle Award for Best Foreign Language Film

== Best Makeup ==
- Academy Award for Best Makeup and Hairstyling
- BAFTA Award for Best Makeup and Hair
- Canadian Screen Award for Best Hair
- Canadian Screen Award for Best Makeup
- David di Donatello for Best Make-up
- Saturn Award for Best Make-up
- Broadcast Film Critics Association Award for Best Makeup
- Metro Manila Film Festival Award for Best Make-up Artist
- Nandi Award for Best Makeup Artist
- Nandi Award for Best Makeup Artist
- IIFA Award for Best Makeup
- National Film Award for Best Make-up Artist
- Vijay Award for Best Make Up Artistes
- Kerala State Film Award for Best Makeup Artist
- Africa Movie Academy Award for Best Makeup
- ARY Film Award for Best Makeup and Hairstyling
- Tamil Nadu State Film Award for Best Make-up Artist

== Best Picture ==
- AACTA Award for Best Film
- Academy Award for Best Picture
- BAFTA Award for Best Film
- BAFTA Award for Outstanding British Film
- Boston Society of Film Critics Award for Best Film
- Cairo International Film Festival
- Canadian Screen Award for Best Motion Picture
- Cannes Film Festival’s Palme d’Or
- César Award for Best Film
- Critics' Choice Movie Award for Best Picture
- Crystal Simorgh for Best Film
- Empire Award for Best Film
- Empire Award for Best British Film
- Filmfare Award for Best Film
- Golden Globe Award for Best Motion Picture – Drama
- Golden Globe Award for Best Motion Picture – Musical or Comedy
- Film Fest Gent’s Grand Prix
- Guldbagge Award for Best Film
- Los Angeles Film Critics Association Award for Best Film
- Independent Spirit Award for Best Film
- MTV Movie Award for Best Movie
- Lux Style Award for Best Film
- NAACP Image Award for Outstanding Motion Picture
- National Board of Review Award for Best Film
- National Film Award for Best Feature Film
- National Society of Film Critics Award for Best Film
- New York Film Critics Circle Award for Best Film
- Producers Guild of America Award for Best Theatrical Motion Picture

== Best Production Design ==
- AACTA Award for Best Production Design
- Academy Award for Best Production Design – Formally known as Best Art Direction
- BAFTA Award for Best Production Design
- César Award for Best Production Design
- National Film Award for Best Production Design
- Metro Manila Film Festival Award for Best Production Design
- Polish Academy Award for Best Production Design
- Golden Calf for Best Production Design
- Bavarian Film Awards (Production Design)
- European Film Award for Best Production Designer
- Africa Movie Academy Award for Best Production Design
- Satellite Award for Best Art Direction and Production Design
- Saturn Award for Best Production Design

== Best Score (or Best Original Score) ==
- AACTA Award for Best Original Music Score
- Academy Award for Best Original Score
- Academy of Canadian Cinema and Television Award for Best Achievement in Music – Original Score
- BAFTA Award for Best Film Music
- Canadian Screen Award for Best Original Score
- Golden Globe Award for Best Original Score
- Grammy Award for Best Score Soundtrack for Visual Media
- Hollywood Music in Media Award for Best Original Score in a Feature Film
- Satellite Award for Best Original Score

== Best Song (or Best Original Song) ==
- Academy Award for Best Original Song
- Broadcast Film Critics Association Award for Best Song
- Canadian Screen Award for Best Original Song
- Golden Globe Award for Best Original Song
- Grammy Award for Best Song Written for Visual Media
- Guild of Music Supervisors Award for Best Song Written and/or Recording Created for a Film
- Hollywood Music in Media Award for Best Original Song in a Feature Film
- Lux Style Award for Best Song of the Year
- Satellite Award for Best Original Song

== Best Sound ==
- AACTA Award for Best Sound
- Academy Award for Best Sound
- BAFTA Award for Best Sound
- Broadcast Film Critics Association Award for Best Sound
- Canadian Screen Award for Best Overall Sound
- Canadian Screen Award for Best Sound Editing
- César Award for Best Sound
- David di Donatello for Best Sound
- Filmfare Award for Best Sound Design
- Golden Calf for Best Sound Design
- IIFA Award for Best Sound Recording
- Kerala State Film Award for Best Sound Recordist
- Laurence Olivier Award for Best Sound Design
- Online Film Critics Society Award for Best Sound
- Polish Academy Award for Best Sound
- Satellite Award for Best Sound

== Best Special Effects (or Best Visual Effects) ==
- Academy Award for Best Visual Effects, which was called "Best Special Effects" from 1939 to 1963, and included both visual and sound effects from 1939 to 1962
- BAFTA Award for Best Special Visual Effects, which has been known as that since it was introduced in 1982
- Canadian Screen Award for Best Visual Effects
- César Award for Best Visual Effects
- MTV Video Music Award for Best Visual Effects
- Satellite Award for Best Visual Effects

== See also ==
- List of films voted the best
