= Dries Verhoeven =

Dutch artist (born 1976)

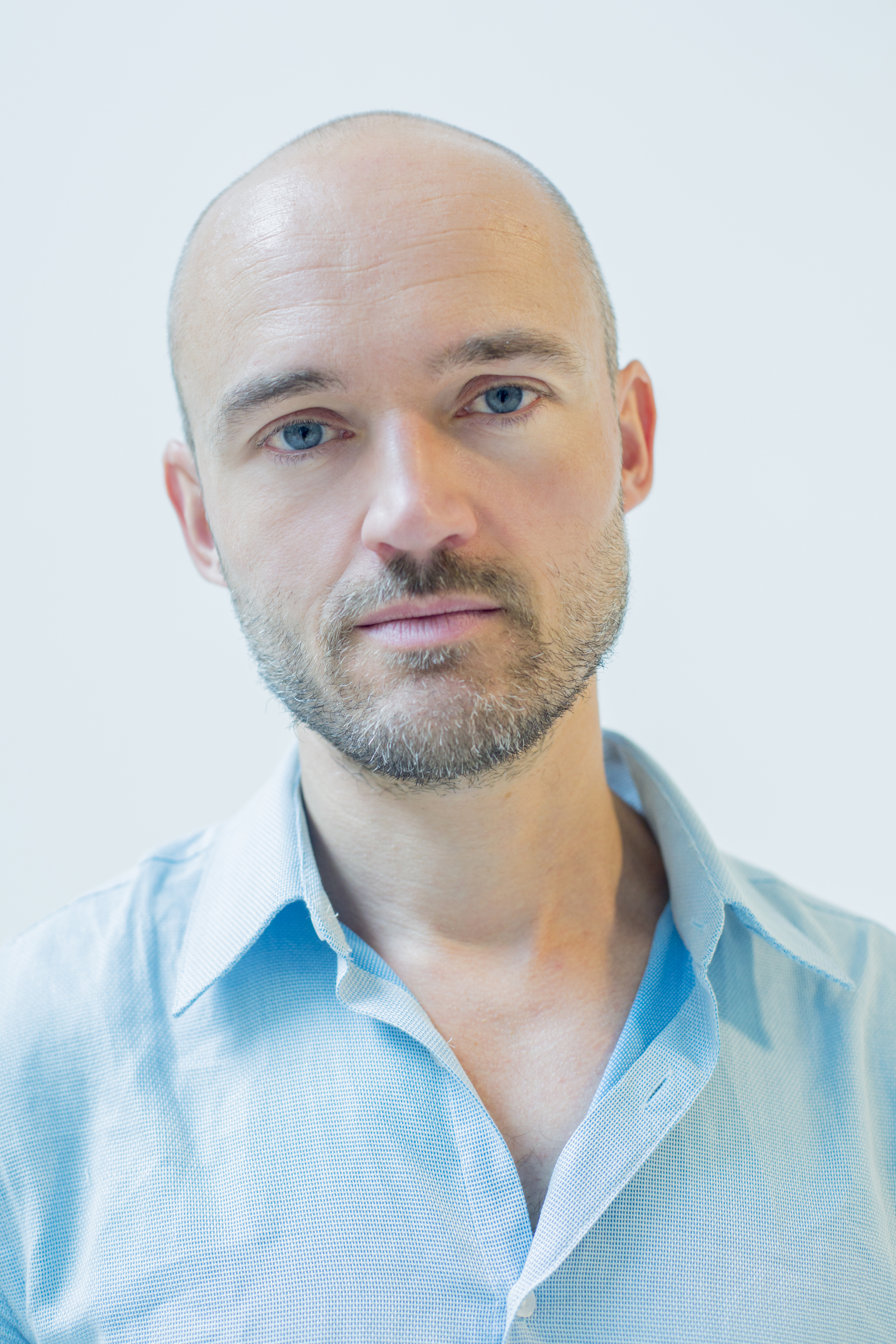
- Born: 26 February 1976 (age 49); Oosterhout
- Education: Maastricht Institute of Arts
- Years active: 2003 - current
- Website: driesverhoeven.com/en/

Dries Verhoeven (born 26 February 1976, Oosterhout) is a Dutch visual artist and theater maker working with installation art, performance art and public interventions. His work often addresses social and political themes and is frequently situated in public spaces. Since 2020, he has been a member of the Akademie van Kunsten (Dutch Society of Arts). Verhoeven resides in Berlin and Amsterdam.

Verhoeven is representing the Netherlands at the 61st Venice Biennale, collaborating with curator Rieke Vos.

== Biography ==
Dries Verhoeven studied scenography at the Maastricht Institute of Arts. Initially working as a scenographer, he collaborated with artists including Marcus Azzini, Cornelis de Bondt, Ira Judkovskaja, Michel van der Aa, and Lotte van den Berg.

Since 2003, Verhoeven has created his own projects combining theatre, performance and installation art. From 2012, his focus shifted more towards time-based visual art, presented in galleries, theaters, and public spaces.

== Artistic approach ==
Verhoeven combines performance and installation art, often incorporating audience participation and continuous formats. His work addresses ethical questions within contemporary Western society, examining themes such as the impact of digital media, psychoactive substances, robotics, power dynamics between the Global North and South, and changing global hierarchies. A cited description characterizes his work as aiming to "[unbalance] the visitor in order to evoke a shared vulnerability between the viewer and the viewed work". Collaboration is central to his practice, frequently involving groups whose experiences relate to the ethical and social themes explored. Past collaborators have included shoplifters, individuals with refugee backgrounds, migrant workers, recreational drug users, and people experiencing homelessness.

== Work ==
=== Guilty Landscapes (2016) ===
Guilty Landscapes presents what initially appears to be a pre-recorded video of a location associated with suffering or conflict, but is revealed as a live internet connection. A person at the remote location interacts with gallery visitors via the video feed, mirroring their movements. An accompanying essay by Dirk Vis interprets the installation as questioning the act of viewing suffering from a distance and examining the power dynamics in such observation, directing attention to the viewer's gaze. The work received the Best International Performance award at the Fadjr International Theater Festival in 2018.

=== Brothers exalt thee to Freedom (2021) ===
This continuous performance featured ten Bulgarian performers, previously employed as labor migrants, singing a historical labor song for eight hours daily in a setting resembling a robotized distribution center. Work breaks followed schedules similar to those used in Amazon warehouses. The installation included an exhibition of the performers' living quarters, objects from various workplaces, along with video documentation showing the performers' perspectives on labor politics. The work was nominated for the VSCD Mime Performance Prize 2020/2021.

=== The NarcoSexuals (2022) ===
The NarcoSexuals depicts a group of men participating in a chemsex party inside a replica single-family home. Visitors observe the scene from the outside through windows. In an accompanying essay, Verhoeven suggests the installation examines tensions between sexual expression and regulation in the public sphere, portraying participants seeking vulnerability and connection. He poses questions in the essay about whether the participants signify a new liberation movement or a departure from earlier sexual ideals.

=== WORK WORK WORK (2024) ===
In 2024, Verhoeven curated WORK WORK WORK at Frascati Theater, Amsterdam, transforming the building into a temporary museum for performance art. The event juxtaposed Verhoeven's Brothers, exalt thee to Freedom, with works by Tehching Hsieh, Ahmet Öğüt, Pierre Bal-Blanc, Anna-Marija Adomaitytė, Julian Hetzel, and Gosia Wdowik.

=== Chronological overview ===
Year	Title	Co-commissioners and venues
2003	Thy Kingdome Come	
2005	Trail Tracking	
2006	The Big Movement	Theaterfestival Boulevard (2006) and Huis & Festival a/d Werf (2009)
2007	You are here	Huis & Festival a/d Werf (2007), Salzburger Festspiele (2009), Zomer van Antwerpen (2009), Hebbel am Ufer (2011), SPRING Performing Arts Festival (2020) and Theaterfestival Boulevard (2020)
2008	No man's land	Huis & Festival a/d Werf (2008), Theaterformen (2009), Hebbel am Ufer (2009), Festival Valencia Escena Oberta (2010), Stadsschouwburg Amsterdam & Frascati (2012), Call of the Mall (2013), Münchner Kammerspiele (2014) and Onassis Cultural Center (2014)
2009	Empty Hands	
2010	Life Streaming	Uz Arts, Huis & Festival a/d Werf, LIFT Festival London and Schauspielhaus Bochum
2011	Dark Room	Münchner Kammerspiele (2011), SPRING Performing Arts Festival (2012), Festival a/d Werf (2012) and Stadsschouwburg Amsterdam (2012)
2011	God zegene de greep	
2012	Fare Thee Well!	Hebbel am Ufer (2012)
2013	Ceci n'est pas…	SPRING Performing Arts Festival.
2014	Homo Desperatus	Stedelijk Museum 's-Hertogenbosch and Theaterfestival Boulevard
2014	The Funeral	SPRING Performing Arts Festival (2014) and the Wiesbaden Biennale (2016)
2014	Wanna Play?	Hebbel am Ufer (2014) and SPRING Festival (2015)
2016	Songs for Thomas Piketty	International Art Manifestation Hacking Habitat and Festival de Keuze.
2016	Guilty Landscapes	SPRING Performing Arts Festival, Foreign Affairs (Berliner Festspiele), Theaterfestival Boulevard and MU Eindhoven
2017	Phobiarama	Onassis Cultural Centre and Holland Festival
2018	Sic transit gloria mundi	SPRING Performing Arts Festival
2019	Happiness	SPRING Performing Arts Festival and NDSM-werf foundation
2019	The Silent Body	In association with Vooruit under the title Animale/Rationale
2021	Brothers exalt thee to freedom	SPRING Performing Arts Festival and art institute West Den Haag
2022	The NarcoSexuals	SPRING Performing Arts Festival
2023	Dear beloved friend,	International Theater Amsterdam and Metropolis (Københavns Internationale Teater)
2024	Everything must go	Holland Festival and Nieuw Dakota

=== Publications ===
- 2009: 80 cm away from you, voorstellingen/performances 2002 – 2009
- 2016: Scratching where it hurts – The book includes essays by Rainer Hofmann, Robbert van Heuven and Igor Dobricic.
- 2019: In Doubt: Studio Dries Verhoeven 2003–2019, Kerber Verlag – The book includes essays by Maaike Bleeker, Evelyne Coussens and Christiaan Weijts.

== Reception ==
Verhoeven's work has been reviewed in various publications. Critical responses often focus on his engagement with social themes. For example, Evelyne Coussens, writing in De Morgen about The NarcoSexuals, described Verhoeven's work as "always an exercise in plural thinking" and suggested it challenges categorization. Anja Quikert reviewed Guilty Landscapes for Theater heute, describing the experience as "deeply moving and unsettling" and noting its focus on empathy boundaries. Vincent Kouters, in De Volkskrant, observed that Brothers exalt thee to freedom used a "seemingly simple yet powerful image'" to distill "complex themes". German theater scholar Theresa Schütz analyzed Guilty Landscapes within the framework of relational aesthetics.

Verhoeven's 2014 project Wanna Play?, commissioned by HAU Hebbel am Ufer, generated controversy and ended prematurely. The installation involved Verhoeven displaying his conversations from the dating app Grindr while inside a glass container in a public square. Public criticism focused on concerns about privacy and consent related to the display of private messages. In response, the artist and venue suspended the installation after five days and held a public discussion on the ethical issues raised. A revised version, Wanna Play? (love in times of Grindr), was presented by SPRING Performing Arts Festival in 2015.

== Recognition ==
- 2003: Charlotte Köhler Prize, awarded by Het Cultuurfonds.
- 2007: Mont Blanc Young Directors Award at the Salzburger Festspiele for You are here.
- 2008: VSCD Mime/Performance Award for You are here and No man’s land.
- 2018: Best International Performance at the Fadjr International Theater Festival for Guilty Landscapes.
- 2022: Fentener van Vlissingen Cultuurprijs for contributions to the arts in Utrecht and beyond.
- 2023: Golden Calf for Best Digital Culture Production at the Netherlands Film Festival for Dear beloved friend,.
