= Sweet Dreams (2023 film) =

2023 film directed by Ena Sendijarević

- Festival release poster
- Directed by: Ena Sendijarević
- Written by: Ena Sendijarević
- Produced by: Leontine Petit; Erik Glijnis
- Starring: Renée Soutendijk; Hayati Azis; Lisa Zweerman; Verdi Solaiman; Hans Dagelet
- Cinematography: Emo Weemhoff
- Edited by: Lot Rossmark
- Music by: Martial Foe
- Production companies: Lemming Film; Plattform Produktion; VPRO; Film i Väst; Talamedia (ID)
- Distributed by: Gusto Entertainment
- Release dates: August 5, 2023 (Locarno); September 28, 2023 (Netherlands)
- Running time: 102 minutes
- Countries: Netherlands; Sweden
- Language: Dutch
- Box office: US$702,446

Sweet Dreams is a 2023 drama film written and directed by Ena Sendijarević, and starring Renée Soutendijk and Hayati Azis. An international co-production between the Netherlands and Sweden, the film is set on a plantation in the Dutch East Indies around the beginning of the 20th century and takes a critical look at the Dutch colonial past.

Sweet Dreams premiered at 76th Locarno Film Festival on August 5, 2023. In September 2023, it opened the 43rd Netherlands Film Festival, where it was nominated in eight categories and won six awards. The film was selected as Dutch entry in Best International Feature Film category for the 96th Academy Awards on September 8, 2023 and appeared in the eligibility list on 7 December 2023, but didn't make it to the shortlist. It was released on 28 September 2023.

== Synopsis ==
Dutch sugar tycoon Jan dies suddenly on a remote island in Indonesia, leaving his wife Agathe in shock. Their son Cornelis and his pregnant spouse Josefien come from the Netherlands to inherit the family empire and are dismayed to find out that Jan's mistress Siti has a crucial role in his testament.

== Cast ==
- Renée Soutendijk as Agathe
- Hayati Azis as Siti
- Florian Myjer as Cornelis
- Lisa Zweerman as Josefien
- Verdi Solaiman as Hong
- Hans Dagelet as Jan
- Muhammad Khan as Reza
- Bart Klever as Hendrik
- Chris Nietvelt as Agathe's Friend
- Rio Kaj Den Haas as Karel
- Peter Faber as Pastor

== Production ==
Filming was planned to take place Indonesia in the summer of 2021 but was forced to relocate due to the COVID-19 pandemic. The production eventually moved to Réunion, an island and overseas department of France, where the film was shot in the summer of 2022.

== Release ==
Sweet Dreams had its premiere on 5 August 2023 in Main Competition section at the 76th Locarno Film Festival, where it won Pardo for Best Performance award. On 14 September 2023, the film was screened in Centrepiece section at the 2023 Toronto International Film Festival. It was selected to open the Netherlands Film Festival on 22 September 2023 and won six Golden Calf awards. The film competed for Louve d'or in International Competition section at the 2023 Festival du nouveau cinéma and was screened on 5 October 2023, followed by a screening at Chicago International Film Festival on October 18, 2023, where it competed in New Directors Competition section for Hugo award and won Silver Hugo. It was screened at the 68th Valladolid International Film Festival in Punto de Encuentro section on 21 October 2023; its screening in Cinema International section at the 29th Kolkata International Film Festival took place in December 2023.

In May 2023, Heretic was reported to have acquired world sales rights to the film.

Sweet Dreams was released theatrically in the Netherlands on September 28, 2023.

== Reception ==
=== Box office ===
The film made $100,429 in Dutch cinemas during its opening weekend. As of 26 November 2023, it grossed $702,446.

=== Critical response ===
On the review aggregator website Rotten Tomatoes, 100% of 16 critics' reviews are positive, with an average rating of 6.9/10.Metacritic assigned the film a weighted average score of 74 out of 100, based on 6 critics, indicating "generally favorable reviews".

Reviewing for Cineuropa, Savina Petkova wrote, "Sendijarević bridges past and present by fleshing out cruel, silenced histories through satire and formalism. If colonialism lives on through its reverberations in the way our world is structured, can we live through the Anthropocene?"

Jordan Mintzer wrote in a positive review for The Hollywood Reporter, "The film seems to be illustrating a point — about colonialism’s glaring evils and troubled heritage — more than telling a captivating story. It’s a worthy addition to a subgenre of period pieces that have been playing the festival circuit for some time now, as emerging filmmakers confront historic traumas with both horror and fascination."

Namrata Joshi for Cinema Express praised the film's cast and direction, "The ensemble is in fine fettle with Azis as Siti capping it with her droll dissent. Sendijarevic uses the power of the deadpan to make a larger political point, be it in the blunt, automated, staccato way in which the story progresses or the deliberately poker-faced performances of the key players."

=== Accolades ===
Sweet Dreams was shortlisted for the 36th European Film Awards, but didn't make it to the nominations announced on 7 November 2023. The film was also selected as Dutch entry in the Best International Feature Film category for the 96th Academy Awards.

Award or film festival	Year	Category	Nominee	Outcome	Ref.
Locarno Film Festival	2023	Best Film (Golden Leopard)	Sweet Dreams	Nominated	
Locarno Film Festival	2023	Pardo for Best Performance	Renée Soutendijk	Won	
Netherlands Film Festival	2023	Golden Calf for Best Feature Film	Sweet Dreams	Won	
Netherlands Film Festival	2023	Golden Calf for Best Director	Ena Sendijarević	Won	
Netherlands Film Festival	2023	Golden Calf for Best Leading Role	Renée Soutendijk	Won	
Netherlands Film Festival	2023	Golden Calf for Best Supporting Role	Florian Myjer	Won	
Netherlands Film Festival	2023	Golden Calf for Best Photography	Emo Weemhoff	Won	
Netherlands Film Festival	2023	Best Costume Design	Bernadette Corstens	Won	
Netherlands Film Festival	2023	Best Editing	Lot Rossmark	Nominated	
Netherlands Film Festival	2023	Golden Calf for Best Script	Ena Sendijarević	Nominated	
Festival du Nouveau Cinéma de Montreal	15 October 2023	Louve d'Or	Sweet Dreams	Nominated	
Chicago International Film Festival	21 October 2023	Silver Hugo for New Director	Ena Sendijarević	Won	

== See also ==
- List of submissions to the 96th Academy Awards for Best International Feature Film
- List of Dutch submissions for the Academy Award for Best International Feature Film
