= Truly Naked =

- Directed by: Muriel d'Ansembourg
- Written by: Muriel d'Ansembourg
- Produced by: Isabella Depeweg; Els Vandevorst
- Starring: Caolán O'Gorman; Andrew Howard; Alessa Savage; Juliet Aubrey; Safiya Benaddi; Lyndsey Marshal
- Cinematography: Myrthe Mosterman
- Edited by: Emiel Nuninga
- Music by: Evgueni Galperine; Sacha Galperine
- Production companies: Isabella Films; Prime Time; Cinémadefacto
- Distributed by: Capelight Pictures (United States & Germany); AX1 Entertainment (United Kingdom); Cinobo (Greece and Poland); Njuta Films (Scandinavia); Gluon Media (Latin America)
- Release date: February 16, 2026 (Berlinale)
- Running time: 102 minutes
- Countries: Netherlands; Belgium; France; United Kingdom
- Language: English

Truly Naked is a 2026 internationally co-produced coming-of-age drama film about pornography and intimacy, directed and written by Muriel d'Ansembourg in her feature film directorial debut.

The film won six Golden Calfs in the 2026 Netherlands Film Festival, including Best Feature Film and Best Director.

== Summary ==
Alec an introverted teenager, who works as a cameraman and editor in his fathers pornographic film business, steps out from behind the camera when Nina his classmate challenges him to embrace real connection.

== Cast ==
- Caolán O'Gorman as Alec
- Andrew Howard as Dylan
- Alessa Savage as Lizzie
- Juliet Aubrey as Mrs. Bennett
- Safiya Benaddi as Nina
- Lyndsey Marshal as Julia
- Helena Braithwaite as Rose
- Kate Kennedy as Cecile
- Hana Hrzic as Amy
- Cameron James-King as Jamie
- Buddy Skelton as Aidan
- Dave MacRae as Maths teacher

== Production ==
The project was first announced in 2018 and was shot in the English county of Devon.

Muriel d'Ansembourg was determined to work with someone from the adult entertainment industry on this project. This is where adult actress Alessa Savage came aboard as an actress and consultant. d'Ansembourg and Savage had previously worked together on the Golden Calf-winning short film Fuck-a-Fan, about a superfan who gets a chance to meet his favorite adult actress.

The octopus used in one scene of the film was made of silicone, weighed 65 kilos and could not be heated. Alessa Savage mentioned in an interview with Cineville that lying under it was “very cold and heavy.” According to the newspaper De Tijd, this scene was inspired by the 19th-century woodblock print The Dream of the Fisherman’s Wife by Katsushika Hokusai.

== Awards ==
The film premiered on 16 February 2026 at the 76th Berlin International Film Festival. The film also played in the Dutch Focus competition at Movies That Matter in The Hague and was shown at the Transilvania International Film Festival in Cluj-Napoca, where it won an award for Best Performance for its entire cast.

The film swept the Golden Calves, the Dutch national film awards, at the Netherlands Film Festival, winning six awards for Best Film, Best Director, Best Screenplay, Best Cinematography, Best Editing, and Best Production Design. While receiving her first Golden Calf of the evening, d'Ansembourg remarked in her speech how she was in the bathroom at the Netherlands Film Festival and overheard two women talking about how much they hated the film, but then later one said, "But my mom loved the film."

The film was also shortlisted for the 39th European Film Awards.

== Reviews ==
Dutch newspaper Trouw gave the film 5 out of 5 stars and wrote that “Truly Naked effortlessly tells, in a beautiful, gentle tone, about things that seem incompatible: pornography and the early stages of a relationship.” De Volkskrant gave the film 4 out of 5 stars. It praised the cast, especially actress Alessa Savage, but argued that the film could have been stronger, stating that “The female perspective on pornography and sex is strongly present, but it is also always placed in service of the learning process of the male characters.” Belgian newspaper Het Nieuwsblad also gave it 4 out of 5 stars and praised the performances. De Morgen gave it 3 out of 5 stars and wrote that ''In the third act, Truly Naked escalates even a bit too dramatically, causing the film to become overly expository.'' De Tijd wrote that “The film contains some strong scenes, but ultimately remains too superficial.” Screen Daily wrote in its review that "The problem, Lizzie argues, is not with porn, but with the patriarchy. Which is fine but this conclusion does rather imply that the onus is on women, yet again, to sort out the mess men have made of things.'' Cineeuropa wrote in its review that ''the film is as gentle as it is fully explicit, and this may be d'Ansembourg's biggest achievement: to look at the topic from all angles without judgement, and make it clear that sex is fun and fulfilling, and that porn is not going anywhere – but that society has to be honest about it in order for it to hurt the fewest people possible.''
