= Esther Rots =

Dutch film director (born 1972)

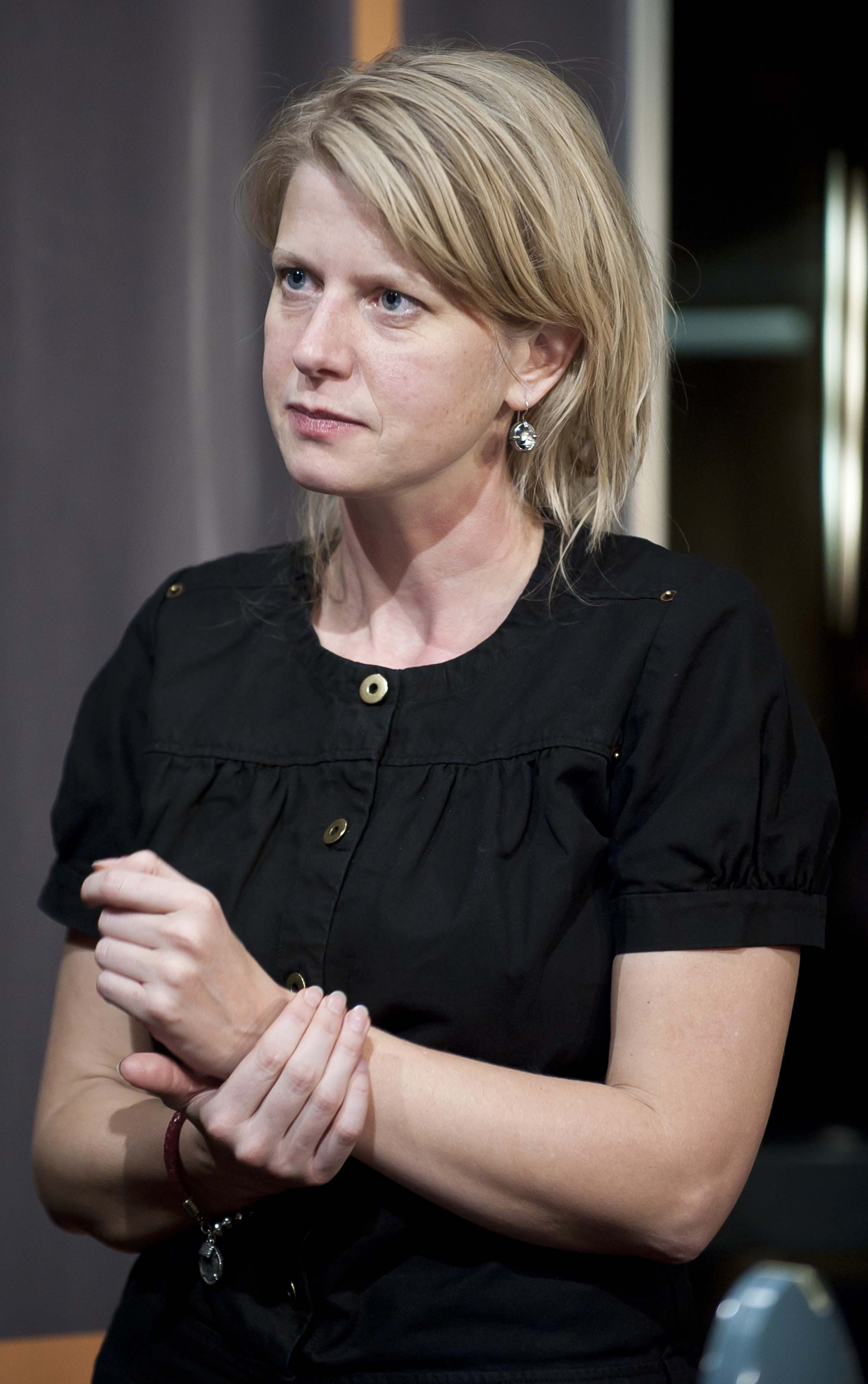
- Esther Rots at the Berlin International Film Festival (2009)
- Born: 23 May 1972 (age 53); Groenlo, Netherlands
- Occupation: Film director

Esther Rots (born 23 May 1972) is a Dutch film director.

Rots made her debut with the 2009 feature film Can Go Through Skin (Kan door huid heen) for which she won the Golden Calf for Best Montage award at the 2009 Netherlands Film Festival. The whole team behind the film also won the Golden Calf Special Jury Prize and Rifka Lodeizen won the Golden Calf for Best Actress for her role in the film.

== Selected filmography ==
- 2009: Can Go Through Skin (Kan door huid heen)
- 2018: Retrospekt
