= Ena Sendijarević =

Bosnian film director

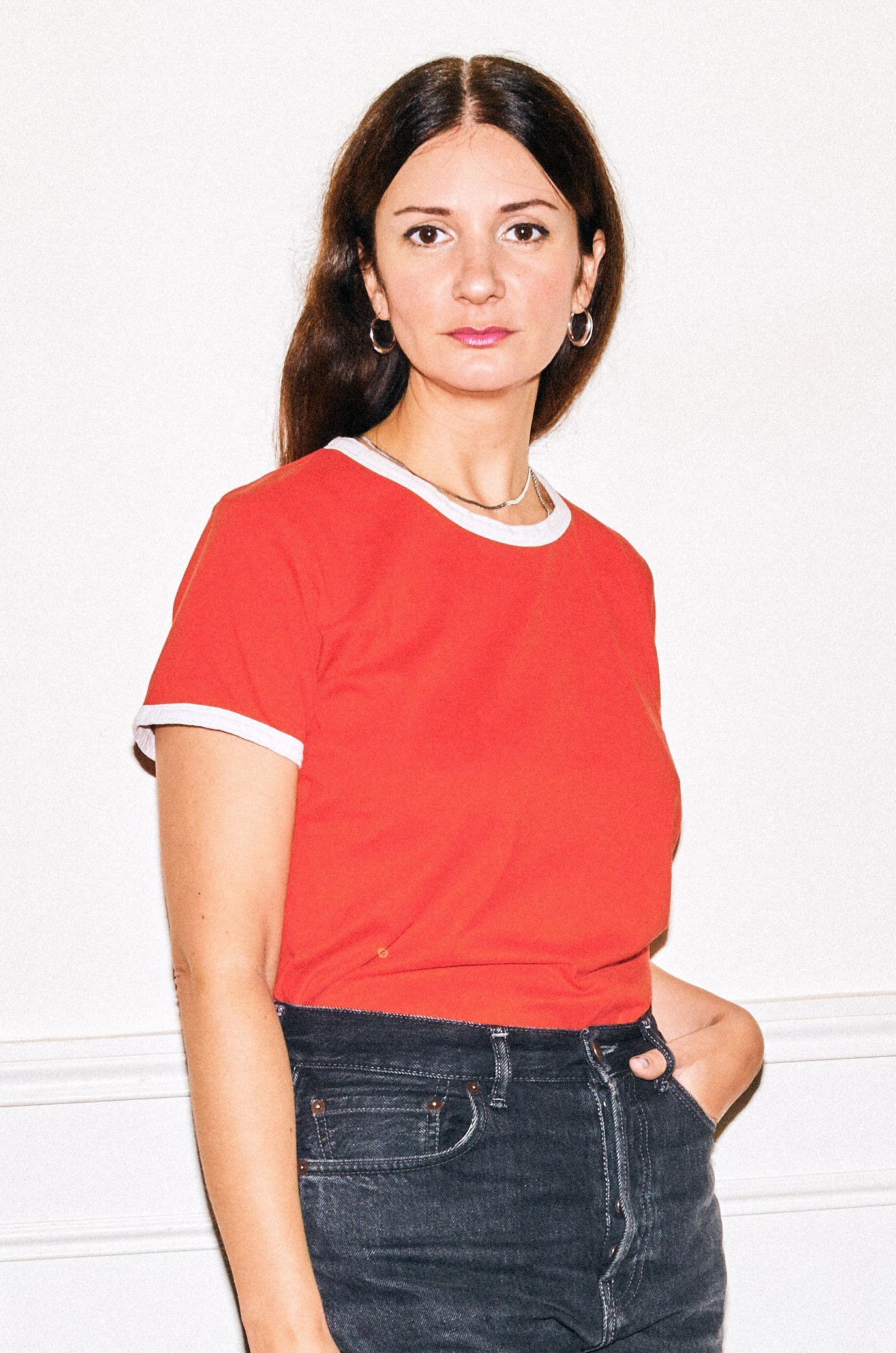
- Sendijarevic in 2024
- Born: 1987 (age 38–39); Odžak, Bosnia and Herzegovina
- Education: Graduate in screenwriting and directing Graduate in Film Theory
- Alma mater: Netherlands Film Academy Freie Universität Berlin
- Occupations: Film director, screenwriter
- Years active: 2013–present
- Notable work: Take Me Somewhere Nice (2019); Sweet Dreams (2023)
- Awards: Golden Calf for Best Director

Ena Sendijarević (born 1987) is a Bosnian-Dutch filmmaker and screenwriter known for her distinctive blend of surrealism, satire, and sharp social commentary and exploration of themes such as power, identity, sexuality and migration. Her notable works include Import (2016), which premiered at the Cannes Directors' Fortnight; Take Me Somewhere Nice (2019), winner of the Heart of Sarajevo Award for Best Feature Film; and Sweet Dreams (2023), a satirical exploration of Dutch colonialism that premiered to critical acclaim.

She is sometimes also credited as Ena Sendijarevic (without the diacritic) in international contexts.

== Early life and education ==
Sendijarević was born in 1987 in Odžak, Bosnia and Herzegovina. Later she moved with her family to Modriča, where she remained until the beginning of the Bosnian War. After moving 20 times, including to Berlin, she moved to Amsterdam in 2002. She studied media and culture at the University of Amsterdam and the Freie Universität Berlin. In 2014, she graduated with a degree in screenwriting and directing from the Netherlands Film Academy.

== Career ==
In 2013, Sendijarević wrote and directed her first short film, Reizigers in de Nacht (Travellers in the Night). The film was selected for the VERS Award and won the VEVAM Go Short Award for Best Dutch Short at the Go Short International Short Film Festival 2014. She directed the short film Fernweh (2014), which premiered at the Palm Springs International Film Festival.

Sendijarević's 2016 short film, Import, premiered at the Cannes Directors' Fortnight. The film tells the story of a Bosnian refugee family in the Netherlands and its experience of integrating. In September 2016, it was selected at the 2016 Toronto International Film Festival in Short Cuts section.

Sendijarević's debut feature film, Take Me Somewhere Nice (2019), premiered in the Tiger Competition of the 48th International Film Festival Rotterdam, where it won a Special Jury Award for an extraordinary artistic achievement (a prize worth €10,000). The film is a coming-of-age story about a teenaged girl who travels to Bosnia to visit her ailing father in hospital. It won the prize for Best Feature Film at the Sarajevo Film Festival (the Heart of Sarajevo award) and at the Seoul International Women's Film Festival. It was reviewed in Variety as "a stylishly quirky debut feature".

In 2023, her film Sweet Dreams was selected as opening film of Netherlands Film Festival where it won six Golden Calf Awards. Individually she won Golden Calf for Best Director and was nominated for Golden Calf for Best Script. The film was also selected as Dutch entry in the Best International Feature Film category for the 96th Academy Awards.

On December 20, 2024, it was announced that Sendijarevic's English-language debut The Possessed has been greenlit for a 2026 shoot. The film is described as a "dark, surrealist exploration of a love triangle between two women fleeing the European witch hunts and the man who becomes their captive."

In 2025, Sendijarević was appointed the jury member at the 31st Sarajevo Film Festival for Competition Programme – Feature Film.

== Filmography ==
Year	Title	Director/ Writer	Notes	Ref.
2013	Traveler in the Night	Director and writer		
2014	Fernweh			
2016	Import		Premiered at Cannes' Directors' Fortnight	
2016	Eng		TV Mini-series, 1 episode - "Space Girls"	
2019	Take Me Somewhere Nice	Director and writer	Selected for Cannes ACID sidebar	
2023	Sweet Dreams	Director and writer	NFF opening film	

== Accolades ==
Award ceremony	Year	Category	Nominee /Work	Result	Ref.
Sarajevo Film Festival	2019	Heart of Sarajevo	Take Me Somewhere Nice	Won	
International Film Festival Rotterdam	2019	Special Jury Award	Take Me Somewhere Nice	Won	
Seoul International Women's Film Festival	2019	Best Picture	Take Me Somewhere Nice	Won	
Netherlands Film Festival	2023	Golden Calf for Best Director	Sweet Dreams	Won	
Netherlands Film Festival	2023	Golden Calf for Best Script	Sweet Dreams	Nominated	
