= Kim van Kooten =

Dutch actress and screenwriter (born 1974)

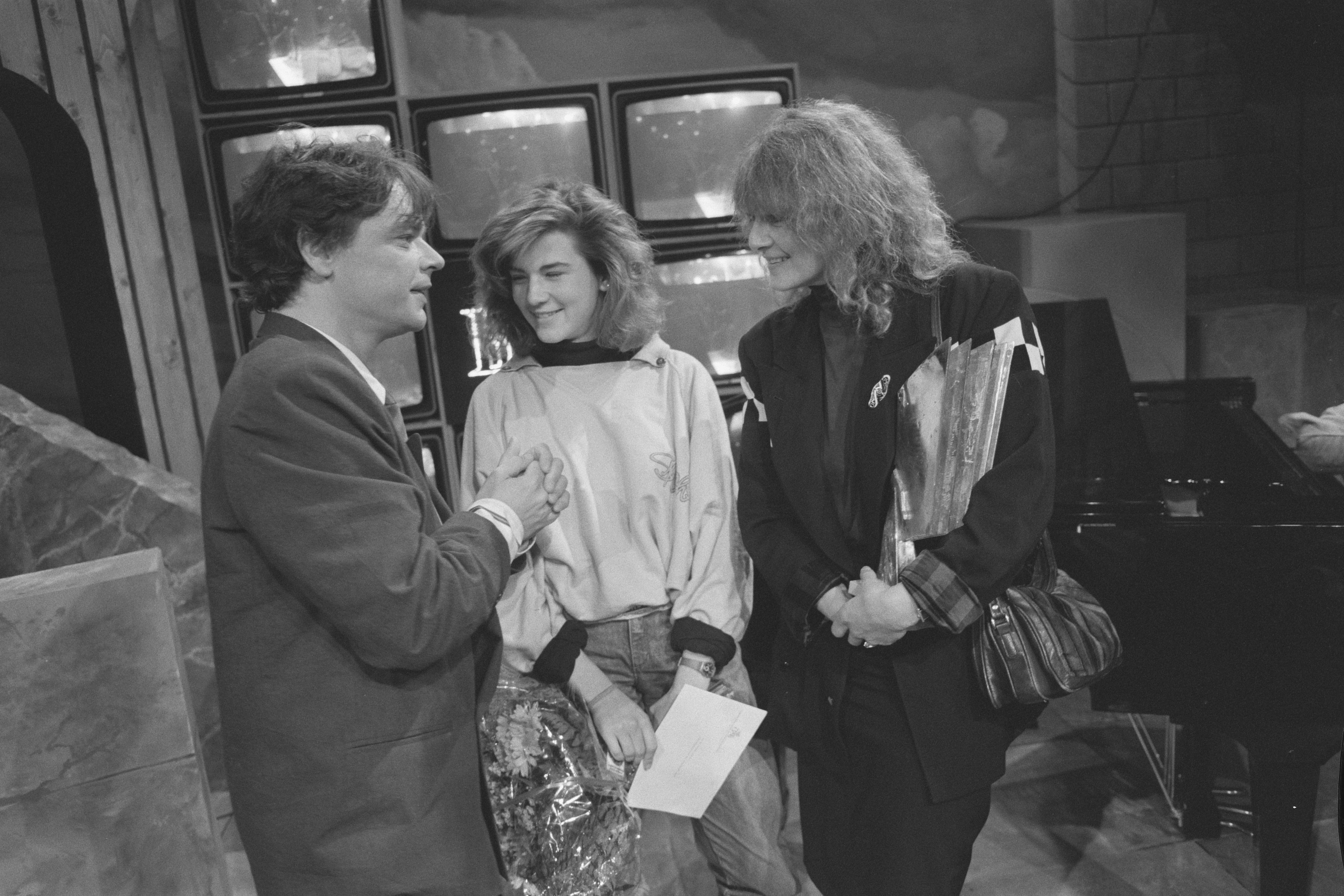
- Van Kooten (centre) with her mother (right) interviewed by Boudewijn Büch (left) in 1987
- Born: Kim van Kooten; 26 January 1974 (age 51); Purmerend, Netherlands
- Occupations: actress; screenwriter
- Years active: 1994–present
- Parent: Kees van Kooten (father)

Kim van Kooten (born 26 January, 1974) is a Dutch actress and screenwriter. In international cinema, she is best known for the 2003 Dutch production Phileine Says Sorry, filmed partly in New York City, in which she plays the lead. She was also the screenwriter of the script of the very successful Dutch movie Love Is All and won a Golden Calf for Best Actress in Phileine Says Sorry (2003), and for Best Scenario with Met grote blijdschap (2001).

== Life and work ==
Van Kooten was born on 26 January 1974 in Purmerend, Netherlands, to Kees van Kooten and Barbara Kits. Her brother is the actor and singer Kasper van Kooten. She grew up in Zuidoostbeemster. In 1987, together with her mother she accepted on behalf of her father the CPNB's audience award. CPNB proclaimed him to be the most popular author in the category novels and stories.

She studied screenwriting at the Film Academy in Holland, but dropped out in the first year. After a chance meeting with director Robert Jan Westdijk, van Kooten made her acting debut in the film Zusje (Little Sister). These were followed by films such as Jesus is een Palestijn (Jesus is a Palestinian) (with her then boyfriend Hans Teeuwen), Mariken and Phileine Zegt Sorry (for which she won a Golden Calf for Best Actress).

She is also a screenwriter and was asked by Theo van Gogh to do the script for the film Blind Date. She now specialises in working with characters and real-life dialogue.

Besides being an actress and writer, van Kooten worked as an editor and presenter for the cinema programme Stardust for the Dutch television network VPRO. She was the star of a dramedy show called Evelien, that shown on Net5.

She has written the script of the successful Dutch movie Alles is Liefde (Everything is Love). The movie has been seen over a million times, which resulted in a Diamond Film award. Later, it received a Dutch Golden Calves award for best Dutch movie. She is married to actor Jacob Derwig, with whom she has two children, Roman and Kee Molly (born 17 December 2007). They met on the set of the TV-series De acteurs (The actors), where various actors played different roles written by Van Kooten.

== Filmography ==
=== As an actress ===
- 1995: Zusje as Daantje Zuidewind
- 1996: Red Rain
- 1998: Een Hoertje en haar broertje as Elena
- 1999: Jezus is een Palestijn as Natasja
- 2000: Mariken as Isabella
- 2001: Olivetti 82
- 2002: Snapshots
- 2002: Bella Bettien as Monique
- 2003: Phileine zegt sorry as Phileine
- 2006: Evelien (TV-series) as Evelien
- 2010: Loft
- 2011: Alfie, the Little Werewolf as moeder Vriends
- 2012: Black Out
- 2013: The Dinner

She also voices one of the characters in the movie Undercover Kitty (2001).

=== As a screenwriter ===
- 1994: Nighthawks
- 1996: Blind Date (dialogs)
- 2000: Mariken (with role for her brother Kasper van Kooten)
- 2001: Met grote blijdschap
- 2001: Acteurs, De (television series)
- 2002/2003: musical: Na de zomer (in cooperation with songwriter Niek Barendsen)
- 2007: Alles is Liefde
- 2012: "Entertainment Experience"
