= The Garden of Earthly Delights (2025 film) =

2025 drama film by Morgan Knibbe

- Directed by: Morgan Knibbe
- Screenplay by: Morgan Knibbe; Roelof Jan Minneboo
- Produced by: Armi Rae Cacanindin; Frank Hoeve; Eurydice Gysel; Martien Vlietman
- Starring: JP Rodriguez; Benjamin Moen
- Cinematography: Frank van den Eeden
- Edited by: Xander Nijsten
- Music by: Jose Antonio Buencamino; Mo'ong Pribadi
- Production companies: BALDR Films; Czar Films; Popple Pictures
- Distributed by: September Film Distribution (Netherlands)
- Release dates: 22 March 2025 (Netherlands; Movies That Matter Festival); 15 November 2025 (Philippines; QCinema)
- Running time: 124 minutes
- Countries: Netherlands; Philippines; Belgium
- Languages: Filipino; English

The Garden of Earthly Delights (Filipino: Ang Hardin ng Makalupang Kasiyahan) is a 2025 drama film directed by Morgan Knibbe from a screenplay he co-wrote with Roelof Jan Minneboo. The story, set in Manila's informal settlements, follows a young boy who aspired to become a gangster, crossed paths with a Dutch tourist who sought solace in the capital's red light district after being scammed, and whose lives collide in a brutal encounter of exploitation and survival.

An international co-production between the Netherlands, the Philippines, and Belgium, the film premiered in the Netherlands on 22 March 2025, as part of the Movies That Matter Festival. It received a Philippine release on 15 November, as part of the 13th QCinema International Film Festival's Before Midnight category.

== Plot ==
11-year-old scavenger, Ginto, who fights for his life, respect, and freedom, is determined to become a prominent gangster rather than scavenging trash every day.

== Cast ==
- JP Rodriguez as Ginto: An 11-year-old scavenger who aspired to be a gangster
- Benjamin Moen as Michael: A Dutch tourist who was scammed by a fake relationship
- Francesca Dela Cruz as Asia
- Bunny Candag as Beyonce
- John Michael Toling as Jojo
- Daniel Palisa as Evil Jesus
  - Milan van Aagten as the voice of Evil Jesus
- Joshua Eliason as Tourist

== Production ==
The idea of the film originated from Morgan Knibbe's one-year experience as a director of photography for a documentary about street children. While writing the screenplay in 2019, he further immersed himself in the country with co-writer Roelof Jan Minneboo and associate producer Kristine Kintana. The director points out that it addresses overlooked realities, highlights global postcolonial inequalities, and employs cinema to reveal injustice, spur actions, and advance a more inclusive society via a wide range of genuine viewpoints.

== Reception ==
=== Critical response ===
Veronica Orciari, writing for Cineuropa, praised the film's screenplay, visuals, editing, and emotional weight, characterizing it as a powerful depiction of a brutal reality that shows that Western capitalism forces youth from exploited countries to seek hope and flee in erroneous ways because there is no simple route out of their predicament.

In contrast, Saund Axl Rose Mendez and Ian Cruz, both writing for Sinegang PH, gave a mixed review and, while praising its stunning cinematography, genuine emotional resonance, and great artistic vision, the film was criticized for exploiting the exploited people (despite being a critique of the said matter), citing it provoked a reaction through its graphic depiction of sexual abuse.

Epoy Deyto, writing for Asian Movie Pulse, also gave a mixed review, with praise towards the cast's acting performances and the technical merits, particularly van den Eeden's cinematography. However, the directorial execution by Morgan Knibbe was criticized, with critics arguing that the film was marred by its "anxious expression of unresolved inner turmoil", rather than offering an insightful reflection on the topics depicted.

=== Accolades ===
Award	Date	Category	Recipient	Result	Ref.
Torino Film Festival	21 November 2025	Best Film	The Garden of Unearthly Delights	Won	
Netherlands Film Festival – Golden Calf Awards	3 November 2025	Best Director	Morgan Knibbe	Won	
Netherlands Film Festival – Golden Calf Awards	3 November 2025	Best Cinematography	Frank van den Eeden	Won	
Netherlands Film Festival – Golden Calf Awards	3 November 2025	Best Editing	Xander Nijsten	Won	
Netherlands Film Festival – Golden Calf Awards	3 November 2025	Best Sound Design	Vincent Sinceretti	Won	
