= The Delivery (film) =

1999 English-language Dutch action film

- Theatrical release poster
- Directed by: Roel Reiné
- Screenplay by: David Hilton
- Produced by: Roel Reiné; Thijs Bayens
- Starring: Fedja van Huêt; Freddy Douglas; Aurélie Meriel
- Cinematography: Jan van den Nieuwenhuijzen
- Edited by: Jef Hertoghs; Roel Reiné
- Music by: Cor Bolten
- Production companies: Two Independent Film; Veronica
- Distributed by: Warner Bros. (Netherlands); Trimark Pictures (International)
- Release dates: 14 September 1999 (Film by the Sea); 16 September 1999 (Netherlands)
- Running time: 105 minutes
- Country: Netherlands
- Language: English

The Delivery is a 1999 English-language Dutch action film directed by Roel Reiné, starring Fedja van Huêt, Freddy Douglas and Aurélie Meriel. The film follows two friends on a task delivering $25 million worth of XTC-pills from Amsterdam to Barcelona, but they find out that making the delivery doesn't seem simple as it looks. This was Reiné's first full-length feature film as a director.

The film premiered at the Film by the Sea festival in Vlissingen on 14 September 1999, and was released in the Netherlands by Warner Bros. on 16 September. Despite the film receiving mixed reviews, Reiné received a Gouden Kalf award for best director.

== Synopsis ==
Alfred and his friend Guy are out of money. Alfred's wife Anna arranges a job with drug lord Spike. They're given the task of transporting $25 million worth of XTC-pills from Amsterdam to Barcelona. However, they're expected to make phone calls at five phone boxes along the route to check if they are keeping to the schedule. Anna is taken as a hostage in the process, so they're forced to finish the job. No matter the cost.

== Cast ==
- Fedja van Huêt as Alfred
- Freddy Douglas as Guy
- Aurélie Meriel as Loulou
- Esmée de la Bretonière as Anna
- Christopher Simon as Pierre
- Jonathan Harvey as Marc
- Rik Launspach as Spike
- Hidde Maas as Gerard
- Ingrid De Vos as Françoise
- Daan Schuurmans as Man with Phone
- Ruben van der Meer as AAU Member
- Carolyn Lilipaly as Zac

== Release ==
=== Home media ===
The film was released in the Netherlands on 2 March 2000 on VHS by Warner Home Video.

=== Accolades ===
Accolades received by The Delivery
Year	Award	Category	Recipient(s)	Result	Ref.
1999	Netherlands Film Festival	Golden Calf for Best Director	Roel Reiné	Won	
1999	Netherlands Film Festival	Golden Calf for Best Feature Film	Roel Reiné; Thijs Bayens	Nominated	
1999	Netherlands Film Festival	Golden Calf for Best Actor	Fedja van Huêt	Nominated	
