= Golden Calf for Best Editing =

Dutch film award

The following is a list of winners of the Golden Calf for best editing at the NFF. This category has been awarded since 2003.

- 2026 Emiel Nuninga - Truly Naked
- 2025 Xander Nijsten - The Garden of Earthly Delights
- 2024 Xander Nijsten - Occupied City
- 2023 Fatih Tura - Kiddo
- 2022 Ruben van der Hammen - Do Not Hesitate
- 2021 Marc Bechtold - The Forgotten Battle
- 2020 Ruben van der Hammen - Ze noemen me Baboe
- 2019 Menno Boerema - The Miracle of the Little Prince
- 2018 Wouter van Luijn - Wij
- 2017 Sander Vos - Tonio
- 2016 Sander Vos - Full Contact
- 2015 Mieneke Kramer - Prins
- 2014 Boudewijn Koole - Happily Ever After
- 2013 Katharina Wartena - Boven is het stil
- 2012 JP Luijsterburg - The Heineken Kidnapping
- 2011 Sander Vos - Black Butterflies
- 2010 Job ter Burg - Tirza
- 2009 Esther Rots - Can Go Through Skin
- 2008 Robert Jan Westdijk - In Real Life
- 2007 Herman P. Koerts - Kruistocht In Spijkerbroek
- 2006 Menno Boerema, Albert Elings, Eugenie Jansen & Chris van Oers - Jungle Rudy, Kroniek Van Een Familie
- 2005 Sander Vos - Paradise Now
- 2004 Mario Steenbergen - The Last Victory
- 2003 Peter Alderliesten - Phileine Zegt Sorry

== Sources ==
- Golden Calf Awards (Dutch)
- NFF Website
