= Oink (2022 film) =

2022 Dutch film

- Theatrical release poster
- Original title: Knor
- Directed by: Mascha Halberstad
- Written by: Tosca Menten; Fiona van Heemstra
- Produced by: Marleen Slot
- Cinematography: Peter Mansfelt
- Edited by: Jef Grosfeld
- Music by: Rutger Reinders
- Distributed by: Viking Film (Netherlands)
- Release dates: February 10, 2022 (Berlin Film Festival); July 13, 2022 (Netherlands)
- Running time: 72 minutes
- Country: Netherlands
- Language: Dutch

Oink (Dutch: Knor) is a 2022 Dutch stop-motion animated comedy film based on the book The Revenge of Oink by Tosca Menten. It was the first stop motion feature film ever made in the Netherlands. The film premiered on the 72nd edition of the Berlin Film Festival. The film won three Golden Calves for Best Feature Film, Best Director and Best Production Design. Making it the first animated film to ever win these awards. It also received the Golden Film, a distinction for Dutch films with more than 100.000 tickets sold during its release. The film also made it on the shortlist for the Academy Award for Best Animated Feature but wasn't nominated.

== Plot ==
In 1994, during the 75th edition of the King Sausage Contest at Moppel, two butchers named Smak and Tuitjes get in a fight after the former's sausages are criticized for containing rat tails, which leads both of them to be disqualified from the contest for 25 years.

25 years later, young girl Babs is a vegetarian whose family forbids any kind of meat, and has a brother, Tijn. One day, on her birthday, she adopts a piglet at a farm, who she names "Oink". The next day, Tuitjes explains that Smak is intending to take Oink's sausages to the 100th edition of the King Sausage Contest.

The following day, Oink wrecks her mother's vegetable garden when being forced to take a bath, much to her mother's dismay. Babs, refusing to let Oink go, gives her mother one more chance for her pet. She takes Oink to a pet obedience test to train the piglet with Tuitjes' help, and succeeds in doing so. However, during a party back home, after Oink accidentally defecates on the floor, her mother orders Babs to return the piglet, but Babs refuses.

Smak reveals to Babs that Tuitjes is actually the culprit of taking Oink to the contest. On the day of the contest, Tuitjes abducts Oink, taking it to a shed. After a failed attempt to shove Oink into a meat grinder, he flees on a tractor with the piglet. Babs, Tijn, and her family give chase, stop Tuitjes, and rescue Oink. Oink uses its excrement on the grinder, which Tuitjes unknowingly takes it to the contest. This causes him to be disqualified from the contest permanently and resulting in Smak winning the title of King Sausage of the Century. One year later, her family joins the contest, making new kinds of sausages. Babs wins the contest, while Tuitjes infiltrates the contest in a costume.

== King Sausage ==
In July 2022, It was announced that a prequel of the film is being made. The prequel will have most of the same voice cast and will take place 25 years before the events of the first film. The 20-minute-long short film is titled King Sausage and follows the parents of Babs.

== Reception ==
On the review aggregator website Rotten Tomatoes, 100% of 6 critics' reviews are positive, with an average rating of 6.4/10.
