= Retrospekt =

2018 film

- Film poster
- Directed by: Esther Rots
- Written by: Esther Rots
- Starring: Teun Luijkx
- Release dates: 8 September 2018 (TIFF); 21 February 2019 (Netherlands)
- Running time: 101 minutes
- Countries: Netherlands; Belgium
- Language: Dutch

Retrospekt is a 2018 Dutch drama film directed by Esther Rots. It was screened in the Contemporary World Cinema section at the 2018 Toronto International Film Festival.

== Cast ==
- Teun Luijkx as Klaas
- Circé Lethem as Mette
- Nele Hardiman as Nurse
- Matthijs Ten Kate as HRM lawyer
