= Can Go Through Skin =

2009 Dutch film

- Film poster
- Directed by: Esther Rots
- Written by: Esther Rots
- Starring: Rifka Lodeizen; Wim Opbrouck
- Distributed by: Benelux Film Distributors
- Release date: 29 January 2009
- Running time: 94 minutes
- Country: Netherlands
- Language: Dutch

Can Go Through Skin (Dutch: Kan door huid heen) is a 2009 Dutch drama film written and directed by Esther Rots. The film is the first feature film by Rots.

Rots won the Golden Calf for Best Montage and Rifka Lodeizen won the Golden Calf for Best Actress at the 2009 Netherlands Film Festival. The whole team behind the film also won the Golden Calf Special Jury Prize.
