= Ronald Giphart =

Dutch writer

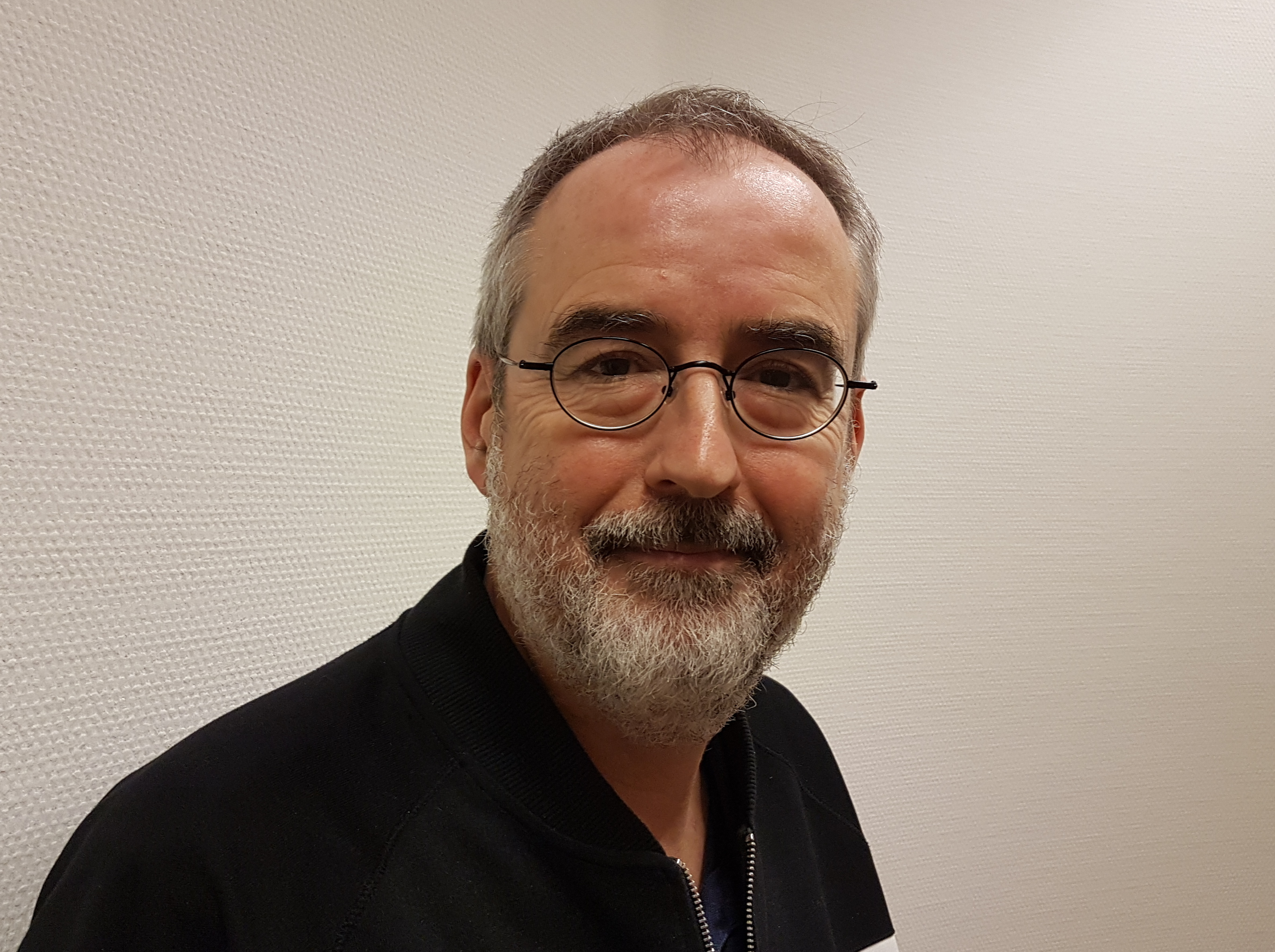
Ronald Giphart (2018)

Ronald Edgar Giphart (born 17 December 1965, in Dordrecht) is a Dutch writer. His best known books, Ik ook van jou (1992), Phileine zegt sorry (1996) and Ik omhels je met 1000 armen (2000), all have been filmed. His 2012 book, Het Leven, De Liefde En De Lusten, was published in English as Living, Loving, Longing.

== Awards ==
- 1993 - Gouden Ezelsoor for Ik ook van jou
- 2004 - C.C.S. Crone-prijs for all his writing
