= Erasmus Brussels University of Applied Sciences and Arts =

Hochschule based in Brussels, Belgium

Coordinates: 51.9172°N 4.5262°E

- Erasmushogeschool Brussel
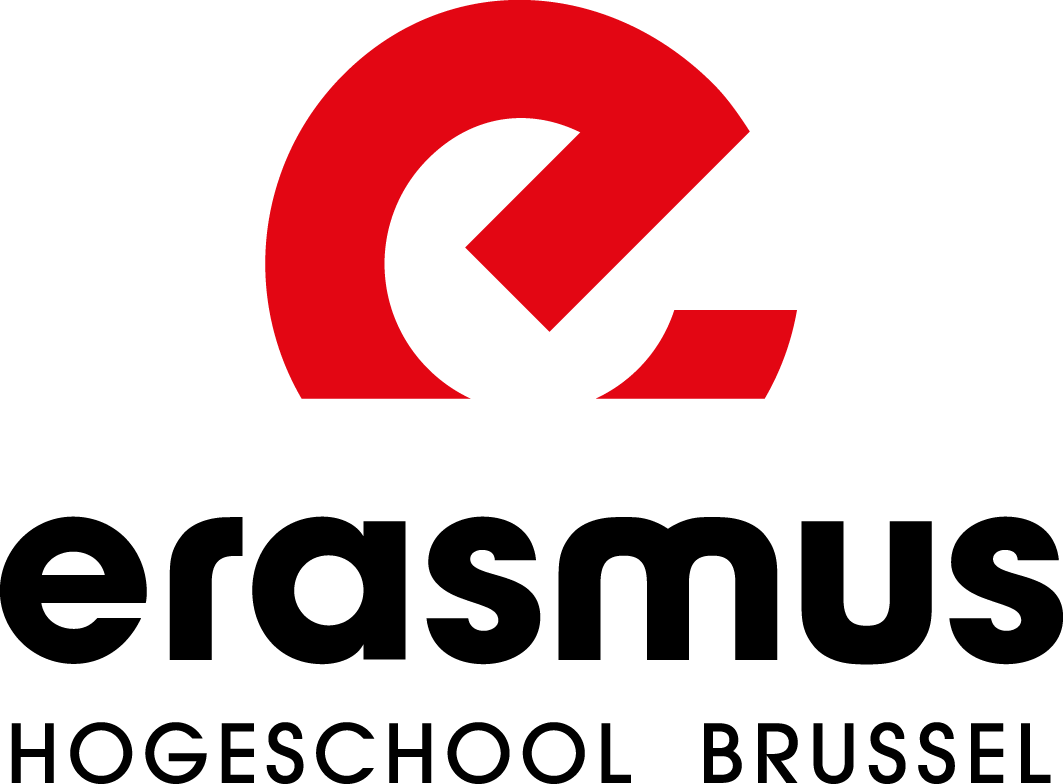
- Logo of the EhB
- Other names: Erasmus University College Brussels; EhB
- Type: Public
- Established: September 1, 1995; 31 years ago
- Affiliations: Brussels University Association, Vrije Universiteit Brussel
- President: Raymonda Verdyck
- Director: Dennis Cluyts
- Students: 4,500
- Location: Brussels, Belgium
- Colours
- Website: www.ehb.be

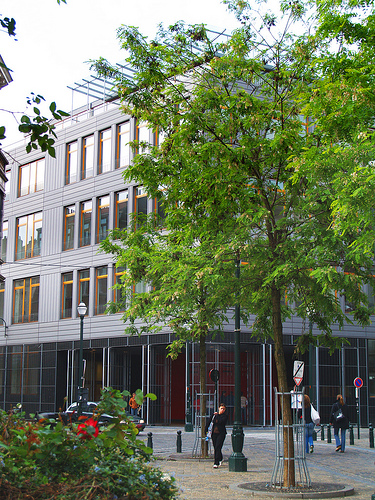
The building of the Erasmushogeschool Brussel department Campus Dansaert

The Erasmus Brussels University of Applied Sciences and Arts (Dutch: Erasmushogeschool Brussel) is an institute of higher education based in Brussels, Belgium.

Like the EU student exchange programme ERASMUS, EhB is named after the humanistic philosopher and author Desiderius Erasmus, who resided in Anderlecht, a municipality of Brussels.

== History ==
The Flemish Higher Education Decree of 13 July 1994 ushered in a large-scale merger operation and reorganisation of the educational system (disciplines and curricula). More than 160 institutions were reduced to 22 colleges. Erasmus University College Brussels came into being in 1995 from a merger of some ten colleges in and around Brussels.

== Department and programmes ==
EhB has around 4500 students and consists of six departments that offer bachelor and master of Art degree programmes in 20 study areas.

=== Departments ===
- Management, Media & Society
- Healthcare, Design & Technology
- Education
- School of Arts: Koninklijk Conservatorium Brussel (Brussels Royal Conservatory)
- School of Arts: Royal Institute for Theatre, Cinema and Sound (RITCS)

=== Bachelor and master degree programmes ===
- Tourism and Recreation Management
- Communications Management
- Journalism
- Idea and Innovation Management
- Hotel Management
- Office Management
- Applied Computer Science
- Multimedia and Communication Science
- Bio-Medical Laboratory Technology
- Nursing and Dietetics
- Nursing
- Midwifery
- Music And Performing Arts
- Social Work
- Nursery School Teacher Training
- Pre-School Teacher Training
- Lower Secondary School Teacher Training
- Audio-Visual Arts
- Drama
- Urban Architecture
- Landscape and Garden Architecture

== Brussels University Association ==
Together with the Vrije Universiteit Brussel (Free University of Brussels), in 2003 the EhB created the Universitaire Associatie Brussel (Brussels University Association) to bring the master's degree programmes in line with the academic requirements of the Bologna declaration.

== Notable graduates ==
- Eric de Kuyper, RITCS, 1967
