= Little Sister (1995 film) =

Zusje
- Theatrical release poster
- Directed by: Robert Jan Westdijk
- Written by: Robert Jan Westdijk; Jos Driessen
- Produced by: Robert Jan Westdijk; Clea de Koning
- Starring: Kim van Kooten; Roeland Fernhout; Ganna Veenhuysen; Hugo Metsers III
- Cinematography: Bert Pot
- Edited by: Herman P. Koerts
- Production company: Grote Broer Filmwerken
- Distributed by: Meteor Film
- Release date: 11 January 1995
- Running time: 91 minutes
- Country: Netherlands
- Language: Dutch

Little Sister (Dutch: Zusje) is a Dutch drama film released in 1995 and directed by Robert Jan Westdijk. Little Sister earned the Special Jury Prize at the 8th Yubari International Fantastic Film Festival in February 1997. It also won the Golden Calf for Best Feature Film.

== Plot ==
Martijn, after the absence of many years, starts following around his sister Daantje with a movie camera. He claims to make a documentary about her. Soon unravels an unresolved issue from a distant past that Daantje doesn't want to be reminded of anymore. It gradually becomes clear how Martijns obsession for his younger sister arose.

== Cast ==
- Kim van Kooten as Daantje
- Romijn Conen as Martijn (credited as Martijn Zuidewind)
- Hugo Metsers as Martijn (voice)
- Bert Pot as Martijn, subjective camera
- Roeland Fernhout as Ramon
- Ganna Veenhuysen as Ingeborg
- Hannah Risselada as Little Daantje
- Michael Münninghoff as Little Martijn
- Alenka Dorrele as Mother Zuidewind
- Peter Idenburg as Father Zuidewind
- Taco Keer as Bas
- Marianne Jeuken as Neighbour
- Carl Wünderlich as Marketender
- Herman Brood as Ramon's upper neighbour
- Eulalia Montseré as Spanish friend
