= The Flying Dutchman (1995 film) =

De Vliegende Hollander
- Directed by: Jos Stelling
- Written by: Hans Heesen; Jos Stelling
- Produced by: Jos Stelling; Alain Keytsman
- Starring: René Groothof; Nino Manfredi
- Cinematography: Goert Giltay
- Edited by: August Verschueren
- Music by: Nicola Piovani
- Distributed by: Meteor/PolyGram
- Release date: 11 May 1995
- Running time: 140 minutes
- Countries: Netherlands; Belgium; Germany
- Language: Dutch
- Box office: $0.1 million (Netherlands)

The Flying Dutchman (Dutch: De Vliegende Hollander) is a 1995 Dutch fantasy comedy-drama film co-written and directed by Jos Stelling. It was shot in eight months, with a budget of about 14 million guilders. It was entered into the main competition at the 52nd Venice International Film Festival, and was later screened at the 20th Toronto Film Festival.

== Plot ==
Flanders, 16th century. The random son of a rogue is trusted to the bike of a crazy minstrel and goes in search of his father to the cold sea. With him he takes a girlfriend, a golden chalice and, most importantly, faith in his goal. However, fate is trying to take away from the Dutch all that he has, even life.

== Cast ==
- René Groothof as Harander
- Nino Manfredi as Campanelli
- Veerle Dobbelaere as Bobby
- René Van 't Hof as Dwarf (Dwerg)
- Gene Bervoets as Zoon Van Netelneck
- Gerard Thoolen as Gevangenisdirecteur
- Willy Vandermeulen as Netelneck
- Michiel Groothof as Kleine Hollander
- Josse De Pauw as Hoedelaar
- Ingrid De Vos as Moeder Hollander
- Senne Rouffaer as Hennetaster
- Bert André as Cackpot
- Niels Vandormael as Kleine Netelneck
- Ronald de Keersmaeker as Jonge Zoon Netelneck
- Jan Steen as Pisser
- Daniel Emilfork as Ketterjager
- Eric Roberts as Sean
