= Golden Calf for Best Sound Design =

Dutch film award

The following is a list of winners of the Golden Calf for best Sound Design at the Nederlands Film Festival (NFF). This category has been awarded since 2003.

- 2003 Herman Pieëte - Phileine Zegt Sorry
- 2004 Georges Bossaers - De Passievrucht
- 2005 Bart Jilesen - Zwarte Zwanen
- 2006 Peter Flamman & his team - Ik Omhels Je Met 1000 Armen
- 2007 Mark Glynne, Kees de Groot, Joost Roskam en Pepijn Aben - Tussenstand
- 2008 Huibert Boon, Alex Booy & Robil Rahantoeknam - Winterstilte
- 2009 Jan Schermer - Nothing Personal
- 2010 Peter Warnier - R U There
- 2011 Jan Schermer - Code Blue
- 2012 Bert Rijkelijkhuizen - The Girl and Death
- 2013 Peter Warnier - De wederopstanding van een klootzak
- 2014 Wart Wamsteker - De Poel
- 2015 Vincent Sinceretti & Taco Drijfhout - Those Who Feel the Fire Burning
- 2016 Mark Glynne - Beyond Sleep
- 2017 Herman Pieëte - Brimstone
- 2018 Jan Schermer - Beyond Words
- 2019 Alex Booy & Huibert Boon - My Foolish Heart
- 2020 Marco Vermaas - Bumperkleef
- 2021 Herman Pieëte - The Forgotten Battle
- 2022 Evelien van der Molen - Captain Nova
- 2023 Zita Leemans & Michel Schöpping - Kiddo
- 2024 Gijs den Hartogh - Hardcore Never Dies
- 2025 Vincent Sinceretti - The Garden of Earthly Delights
- 2026 Evelien van der Molen - Sugar

== Sources ==
- Golden Calf Awards (Dutch)
- NFF Website
