= Eric de Kuyper =

Novelist, filmmaker, semiologist

- Born: Eric Firmin Petrus de Kuyper; 2 September 1942 (age 84); Brussels, Belgium
- Education: Rits, Erasmushogeschool Brussel; Vrije Universiteit Brussel; École des hautes études en sciences sociales (EHESS, PhD)
- Occupations: Novelist, filmmaker, semiologist
- Partner: Emile Poppe
- Writing career
- Language: Dutch (Flemish), French, English, German
- Period: 1980s–present
- Genres: Autobiographical novel, Bildungsroman, mystery, short story, screenplay; essay, academic non-fiction, art criticism, reviews
- Subjects: 3rd-person autobiography, human condition; semiotics, cinema, dance, homosexuality
- Notable awards: Golden Calf Special Jury Prize; Netherlands Film Festival

Eric de Kuyper (born 2 September 1942) is a Flemish-Belgian and Dutch writer, semiologist, art critic, and experimental film director. Fictionalized autobiographical novels, written in the 3rd-person, account for most of his creative work. His academic writing encompasses reviews, essays, articles, and books on semiotics, film, dance, theater, and opera. His non-traditional films reveal an engineered penchant for melodrama, love songs, and silent movies; their central topic is homosexuality. Towards the end of the 2000s, he started organizing concerts en images, events in which he combines silent films, some segments shot by himself for the occasions, with live classical music, and sometimes singing and acting.

== Biography ==
Eric de Kuyper was born and spent his early childhood in Brussels and then, as he put it, his teenage years of choices swayed by "faith, sexuality, and the future" in Antwerp. According to him, his family mostly spoke Dutch while they "thought in French and felt the more subtle emotions" in that language. After graduating from Notre Dame Jesuit High School, he returned to the city of his birth to study in the Department of Audiovisual and Dramatic Arts and Techniques (Rits), Erasmus University College Brussels, and took courses in philosophy and mass communication at the Free University of Brussels. While in college, he began to work as a producer at the Flemish Radio and Television Network. In 1974 he registered for graduate study at the School for Advanced Studies in the Social Sciences in Paris where he worked in semiotics and from which he received a PhD for his thesis "Pour une Sémiotique Spectaculaire" under the direction of A. J. Greimas in 1979. Before he became a full-time writer in 1992, he was professor of film theory at the Catholic University of Nijmegen in the Netherlands (1978–1988), and then deputy director of the Dutch Film Museum (1988–1992). He was on the editorial board of and contributed to the Dutch academic film journal Versus.

De Kuyper has described himself as belonging to the dying breed of inhabitants of Brussels who are fully bilingual in Dutch (Flemish) and French, he also speaks English and German. His most frequent coauthor of academic papers and teammate in filmmaking has been another Flemish Belgian and de Kuyper's fellow student at Brussels and Paris, Emile Poppe, later a colleague at Nijmegen University (Poppe's position with the Film Archives eventually associated him with the University of Groningen). They live near Nijmegen in Kranenburg in Germany, about 5 miles (8.0 km) from the Dutch border, as does the main character of de Kuyper's short story "De verkeerde krant," ("The Wrong Newspaper"). De Kuyper has said that he feels at home both in Belgium and the Netherlands to a certain degree, as well as somewhat of a stranger in each of the countries.

== Fiction ==
=== By the Sea (1988) ===
De Kuyper's first novel (Aan zee: taferelen uit de kinderjaren; By the Sea: Scenes from a Childhood) consists of a series of insightful snapshots of a small boy's life in post-World War II Brussels and family summer vacation at Ostend.

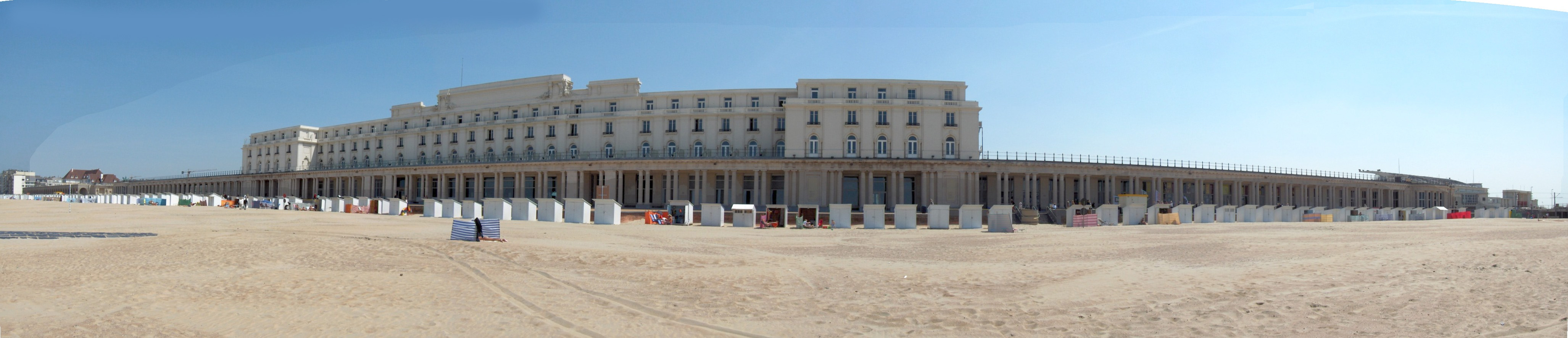
"No one who has read By the Sea can look at the Ostend beach without thinking of de Kuyper."

Together, they conjure up a nostalgic vignette of times gone by, along with a timeless sense of childhood when one feels everything revolves around him. A reviewer said of its effective acuteness that no one who has read it can look at the Belgian beach without thinking of de Kuyper. The lyrical By the Sea turned out to be the first volume in de Kuyper's successful series of 3rd-person fictionalized memoirs.

=== "The Wrong Newspaper" (2008) ===
In the short story (De verkeerde krant), de Kuyper turns his observations to all things German as a Dutch professor, living in Germany like de Kuyper, takes a train trip to Frankfurt:

The ticket inspector came. Ich bedanke mich, he said politely. Strange that in German you thank yourself. For a long time he had pondered why the custom differed so much from that of other languages. In French, English, and Dutch you thank the other person and not yourself. Ultimately, he reached the conclusion that it wasn't so much a direct expression of thanks as a form of courtesy in which I declare myself to be thankful. Of course, you could always just say Danke schön.

The traveler's thoughts drift from languages to comparisons of European newspaper styles to cross-cultural observations, while his journey brings him to an unusual chance encounter as he transfers to a connecting train at Cologne.

== Film ==
De Kuyper's films reveal an engineered penchant for melodrama, love songs, and silent films of Alfred Machin and Yevgeni Bauer. The central theme of his filmmaking is homosexuality. Most of his work is highly experimental underground shown mainly at film festivals.

=== Casta Diva (1983) ===
His non-traditional directorial debut (finished 1982, released 1983) earned him the Grand Prix at the Hyères International Festival of Young Cinema, Different Cinema. Its original Italian title refers to the aria "Oh, pure/chaste goddess..." (i.e., the moon) from Norma. The black-and-white 106'-long feature without a dialogue starts with a stationary camera showing attractive men grooming in front of a mirror while the soundtrack of operatic arias and fragments of other songs challenges the viewer to perceive the two levels as seductive and intoxicating parallels, speculative contrasts, or mold-breaking transgressions. The film establishes a relation with its cinematic objects, male bodies, that is both sensual and distant, somewhat reminiscent of Flesh (dir. Paul Morrissey; 1968) produced by Andy Warhol.

=== A Strange Love Affair (1984) ===
In his most narrative film, de Kuyper explores the themes of melodrama in the context of the characters' selection of lovers, and drives it in with an unconventional ending. The black-and-white photography is by the legendary Henri Alekan, cinematographer on Beauty and the Beast (dir. Jean Cocteau, 1946). The love story between a college student and his 40-year-old professor of film studies (like de Kuyper at the time), specialized in Hollywood dramas, takes an unusual twist when the two decide to visit the student's parents. The father turns out to be the professor's lover of fifteen years ago. De Kuyper said he considered it important not to allow the audience to read the film through the common expectations of a gay topic, while at the same time, the choice of two male lead characters prevented the deciphering of the topic of love through the commonly established codes. He intended the balance to bring to the foreground the film's central topic, the exploration of asynchrony at the roots of the Western notion of love. Rather than a discourse about love in people's real lives, though, A Strange Love Affair is filled with discourse about love as found in the movies, particularly Johnny Guitar (dir. Nicholas Ray, 1954), the controlling metaphor for the whole story.

After a decade-long hiatus from film, de Kuyper collaborated with Chantal Akerman on the screenplays for her La captive (The Captive; 2000) and Demain on déménage (Tomorrow We Move; 2004) and she later cast him in a supporting role in her Die Blutgräfin.

== Bibliography ==
=== Fiction ===
Eric de Kuyper's fiction has been translated to French, Italian, and Hungarian, one short story to English.

- Aan zee: taferelen uit de kinderjaren. (1988)
- De hoed van tante Jeannot: taferelen uit de kinderjaren in Brussel. (1989), NCR Award – Foundation for the Promotion of Art
- Een tafel voor een: reisberichten. (1990)
- Mowgli's tranen. (1990)
- Dag stoel naast de tafel: kroniek van het dagelijkse. (1991)
- Grand Hotel Solitude: taferelen uit de adolescentiejaren. (1991), Shortlisted for AKO Literatuurprijs 1992
- Aantekeningen van een voyeur. (1992)
- Als een dief in de nacht. (1992)
- Bruxelles, here I come: nieuwe taferelen uit de Antwerpse en Brusselse tijd. (1993)
- De verbeelding van het mannelijk lichaam. (1993)
- Ma, Weduwe, Veuve Dekuyper. (1993)
- Te vroeg... te laat...: een liefdesgeschiedenis. (1994)
- Een passie voor Brussel. (1995)
- Drie zusters in Londen: uit de familiekroniek, 1914-1918. (1996)
- Met zicht op zee: aan zee, veertig jaar later. (1997)
- Kinders: over kinderen en hun badwater. (1998)
- Een vis verdrinken. (2001)
- Villa Zeelucht. (2003)
- Het teruggevonden Kind. (2007)
- "De verkeerde krant." ("The Wrong Newspaper.") 2008

=== Non-fiction ===
- Filmische hartstochten. (1984)
- De verbeelding van het mannelijk lichaam: naakt en gekleed in Hollywood, 1933-1955. (1993)
- Alfred Machin, cinéaste, Bruxelles. (1995)
- Jacqueline Veuve: The Poetry of Gestures. (1996)
- Met gemengde gevoelens: over eigenheid, identiteit en nationale cultuur. (2000)
- Een vis verdrinken: een niet-Nederlander tussen de Nederlanders. (2001)

== Filmography ==
=== Film ===
==== Film director ====
- Casta Diva (1983), Grand Prix – Hyères International Festival of Young Cinema, Different Cinema 1982
- Naughty Boys (1983), Golden Calf Special Jury Prize – Netherlands Film Festival 1984
- A Strange Love Affair (1984)
- Pink Ulysses (1990)

==== Screenwriter ====
- Parti sans laisser d'adresse (1982)
- Casta Diva (1983), Grand Prix – Hyères International Festival of Young Cinema, Different Cinema 1982
- Naughty Boys (1983), Golden Calf Special Jury Prize – Netherlands Film Festival 1984
- A Strange Love Affair (1984)
- Pink Ulysses (1990)
- La captive (2000)
- Demain on déménage (2004)

=== Performing arts ===
==== Concerts en images ====
- "Das Stahlwerk der Poldihütte während des Weltkriegs (1916)." Palais des Beaux-Arts, Brussels, 2006.
- "Satie, Cage & film." Cinémathèque Royale de Belgique, Brussels, 2008.
- "Variationen auf Genoveva von Robert Schumann." Berlinale, Berlin, 2010.

==== Actor ====
- Die Blutgräfin (2011)

==== As self ====
- De doormproducenten (interviewee; TV documentary, 1984)
- Pierrot Lunaire (producer, Dutch Film Museum; 1989)
- Drieliuk (interviewee; TV documentary, 1990)

== See also ==
- Flemish literature
- Cinema of Belgium

== Sources ==
- "Eric de Kuyper." Digitale bibliotheek voor de Nederlandse lettern. (in Dutch)
- Directions, Kranenburg, Germany, to the Hauptstraße/Nieuwe Rijksweg border crossing.
