= Becoming Zlatan =

- Directed by: Fredrik Gertten; Magnus Gertten
- Produced by: Margarete Jangård; Lennart Ström
- Starring: Zlatan Ibrahimović
- Cinematography: Michele Fornasero; Goert Giltay; Jon Rudberg; Caroline Troedsson
- Edited by: Jesper Osmund
- Music by: Florencia Di Concilio; Marc Lizier
- Production company: Auto Images
- Distributed by: Tri Art Film
- Release dates: 22 November 2015 (IDFA Festival); 17 February 2016
- Running time: 96 minutes
- Country: Sweden
- Languages: Dutch; English; Italian; Swedish

Becoming Zlatan (Swedish: Den unge Zlatan) is a 2015 Swedish independent coming-of age sports documentary about Swedish International association football player Zlatan Ibrahimović. The film was directed by brothers Fredrik and Magnus Gertten and follows Ibrahimović through his formative years with football clubs Malmö FF and AFC Ajax all the way to his break through with Juventus FC in 2005.

The film has been featured at several film festivals including the International Documentary Film Festival Amsterdam, Helsinki Documentary Film Festival and the Rouen Nordic Film Festival.

== Synopsis ==
The film tells the story of Swedish association football player Zlatan Ibrahimović, during his formative years, through archival footage, including rare interviews with a young Ibrahimović where he speaks about his personal life and the obstacles he has met along the way. The film follows Ibrahimović from his debut with the Swedish club Malmö FF in 1999, his turbulent years with the Dutch club AFC Ajax, all the way up to his breakthrough with the Italian football club Juventus FC The film traces his life as a troubled youth with seemingly insurmountable challenges stemming from his private life, up until joining the global stage as an international star. As a talented young player, Ibrahimović is faced with constant pressure of living up to his expectations, while balancing the challenges he faces at home and in his career path.

== Cast ==
- Marco van Basten as himself
- Leo Beenhakker as himself
- Hasse Borg as himself
- Fabio Capello as himself
- David Endt as himself
- Jan van Halst as himself
- Ahmed Hossam Hussein Abdelhamid as himself
- Zlatan Ibrahimović as himself
- Ronald Koeman as himself
- Jari Litmanen as himself
- Andy van der Meyde as himself
- Luciano Moggi as himself
- Yksel Osmanovski as himself

== See also ==
- Cinema of Sweden
- List of association football films
