= Ja sam iz Krajine, zemlje kestena =

2013 Bosnian film

- Promotional release poster
- Directed by: Jasmin Duraković
- Written by: Mirsad Ćatić
- Based on: Krvavi zalogaj by Mirsad Ćatić
- Produced by: Jasmin Duraković; Mirsad Ćatić; Šemsudin Čengić
- Starring: Edhem Husić; Vanessa Glodjo; Mirsad Tuka; Nikolina Jelisavac; Emina Muftić
- Music by: Sejo Sexon
- Release date: 1 July 2013 (Bihać)
- Running time: 82 minutes
- Countries: Bosnia and Herzegovina
- Language: Bosnian

Ja sam iz Krajine, zemlje kestena (Bosnian for 'I Am from Krajina, the Land of Chestnuts') is a 2013 Bosnian film directed by Jasmin Duraković. The script for the film is based on screenwriter Mirsad Ćatić's unpublished novel Krvavi zalogaj.

== Cast ==
- Edhem Husić as Omer
- Vanessa Glodjo as Dunja
- Mirsad Tuka as Zlatan
- Nikolina Jelisavac as Jasna
- Emina Muftić as Ajka
  - Amra Silajdžić as young Ajka
- Muharem Osmić as Jusuf
- Zijah Bajrić as Agent
- Armin Ćatić as Zlatan's father
- Reshad Strik

== Release ==
The film had its premiere in Bihać on 1 July 2013. It was shown in Sarajevo on 4 July, Tuzla 5 July, and in Bugojno on 7 July 2013.
