= Vanessa Glodjo =

Bosnian actress

Vanessa Glođo
- Born: 8 June 1974 (age 52); Sarajevo, SR Bosnia and Herzegovina, SFR Yugoslavia
- Occupation: Actress
- Years active: 1998–present

Vanessa Glođo (born 8 June 1974), often credited as Vanessa Glodjo, is a Bosnia and Hercegovinian actress. She is best known for her roles in In the Land of Blood and Honey (2011) and Ja sam iz Krajine, zemlje kestena (2013).

Vanesa Glođo was born in Sarajevo. During the Bosnian War, Glođo's leg was wounded by sniper-fire.

== Filmography ==
=== Films ===
- Neočekivana šetnja (1998)
- Jours tranquilles à Sarajevo (1999)
- Heroes (1999)
- Life Is a Miracle (2004)
- Go West (2005)
- Grbavica (2006)
- All for Free (2006)
- Nafaka (2006)
- Duhovi Sarajeva (2007)
- Mona Lisa Has Vanished (2009)
- On the Path (2010)
- In the Land of Blood and Honey (2011)
- Ja sam iz Krajine, zemlje kestena (2013)
- Hiljadarka (2015)
- When Santa Was a Communist (2024)

=== Television ===
- Zaboravljena poslovica (2003)
- Crna hronika (2004)
- Život je čudo (2006)
- Lud, zbunjen, normalan (2008)
- Dva smo svijeta različita (2011)
- Kriza (2013–14)
