= Bygones (film) =

1987 Dutch film

- Directed by: Ine Schenkkan
- Starring: Jasperina de Jong
- Release date: 29 January 1987
- Running time: 90 minutes
- Country: Netherlands
- Language: Dutch

Bygones (Dutch: Vroeger is dood) is a 1987 Dutch drama film directed by Ine Schenkkan. It is based on the book of the same title by Inez Dullemen.

The film won the Golden Calf for Best Feature Film award at the 1987 Netherlands Film Festival. Jasperina de Jong also won the Golden Calf for Best Actress for her role in the film.

== Plot ==
A daughter tries to process the slow death of her parents through dementia.

== Cast ==
- Jasperina de Jong as Inez
- Elise Hoomans as Moeder
- Max Croiset as Father
