= Take Me Somewhere Nice =

2019 film

- Promotional release poster
- Directed by: Ena Sendijarević
- Written by: Ena Sendijarević
- Starring: Lazar Dragojević
- Distributed by: Gusto Entertainment
- Release date: 23 May 2019
- Running time: 91 minutes
- Country: Netherlands
- Languages: Bosnian; Dutch; English
- Box office: $72,305

Take Me Somewhere Nice is a 2019 Dutch-Bosnian drama film written and directed by Ena Sendijarević. In July 2019, it was shortlisted as one of the nine films in contention to be the Dutch entry for the Academy Award for Best International Feature Film at the 92nd Academy Awards, but it was not selected.

It premiered in the Hivos Tiger competition of the Rotterdam Filmfestival, where it won the Special Jury Award for Outstanding Artistic Achievement. was subsequently selected for Cannes' Acid selection and it also won the Heart of Sarajevo award for Best Feature Film at the Sarajevo Film Festival and was named Best Feature Film at the Seoul International Women's Film Festival.

== Cast ==
- Lazar Dragojević as Denis
- Ernad Prnjavorac as Emir
- Sara Luna Zorić as Alma
- Mirsad Tuka

== Reception ==
On the review aggregator Rotten Tomatoes website, the film has an approval rating of 93% based on 27 reviews, with an average rating of 7.3/10.

== Accolades ==
Award ceremony	Year	Category	Nominee /Work	Result	Ref.
Sarajevo Film Festival	2019	Heart of Sarajevo	Take Me Somewhere Nice	Won	
International Film Festival Rotterdam	2019	Special Jury Award	Take Me Somewhere Nice	Won	
Seoul International Women's Film Festival	2019	Best Picture	Take Me Somewhere Nice	Won	
