= Robert Jan Westdijk =

Dutch film director (born 1964)

Robert Jan Westdijk (born 2 November 1964) is a Dutch film director. He was born in Utrecht. His 1995 directorial debut film, Little Sister, won a Golden Calf for Best Feature Film.

== Filmography ==
- Little Sister (1995, released in Dutch as Zusje)
- Novellen: Hollandse held (1996, TV movie)
- Siberia (1998)
- Novellen: Tussen de bomen (1998, TV short)
- Phileine Says Sorry (2003, Phileine zegt sorry)
- In Real Life (2008, Het echte leven)
- The Dinner Club (2010, De eetclub)
- Waterboys (2016)

== Awards ==
- Little Sister (1995)
  - Golden Calf for Best Feature Film
  - Prize of the City of Utrecht at the Netherlands Film Festival
  - Jury Special Prize at the Torino International Festival of Young Cinema
  - Audience Award at the Torino International Festival of Young Cinema
  - Silver Alexander at the Thessaloniki Film Festival
  - Rembrandt Award for Best Film
  - Golden Tulip at the Istanbul International Film Festival (1996)
  - Procirep Award at the Angers European First Film Festival (1996)
- In Real Life (2008)
  - Golden Calf for Best Editing
  - Golden Calf for Best Screenplay of a Feature Film
- The Dinner Club (2010)
  - Golden Film
