= Evelien =

- Written by: Karin van der Meer
- Starring: Kim van Kooten; Peter Blok; Sterre Herstel; Naomi van Es; Olga Zuiderhoek
- Country of origin: Netherlands
- Original language: Dutch
- No. of seasons: 2
- No. of episodes: 8

Production
- Production company: Endemol Nederland B.V.

Original release
- Network: Net5
- Release: 7 March 2006

Evelien is a Dutch dramedy television series made for broadcaster Net5. Actress Kim van Kooten plays the eponymous starring role. So far two seasons have been made; the first episode was broadcast on 7 March 2006. In 2007 the series was sold to Belgian channel Een.

== Plot ==
=== Season 1 (Spring 2006) ===
Evelien is a 38-year-old woman; she has two young daughters, a loving husband Harko and a beautiful house in Amsterdam. But still she feels that something essential is lacking.

Each episode chronicles her daily routine; waking up next to her husband, coming downstairs and telling her two children turn the TV off (Dutch: "Tv uit !"), struggling to the end of the day and going to bed. In the first episode it becomes clear that she has a lover. Theo runs a construction company; he can afford to book a hotel room for himself and Evelien for a year and a half.

When confronted with a fellow divorcing mother—who caught her husband having an affair—Evelien reconsiders her relationship with Theo. In the following episode, she flatly tells Theo that she doesn't want anything to do with him anymore—even though Theo has fallen in love with Evelien and keeps proposing to her. Things come to a head when he makes a phone-call while Evelien's husband is in the room. When she gets called out for her strange behaviour on the phone, Evelien's husband realizes what happens and storms out of the house. The following episodes show the aftermath of this temporary breakup, though the two eventually reconcile. However, all is still not perfect, as Evelien still has some doubts about not seeing Theo anymore. Soon afterwards she learns from Theo's sudden death.

=== Season 2 (Autumn 2006) ===
The family moves to a more spacious house in Amsterdam, but things are still not serene. Because the house is largely decorated in a new-age minimalist sense, it causes tension with the children, Evelien and Harko too are struggling to get used to the new furniture. Breaking out of her boring routine Evelien takes a part-time job (which she loses for reasons of bankruptcy), but Harko is now going through the throes of a mid-life crisis. Things only get worse when she finds out that one of her neighbours is an old lover of Harko's. Seeking relation therapy doesn't help and Harko eventually announces that he needs a weekend off in London; away from Evelien, and together with Wendy. Evelien bursts into tears when she discovers the truth, but her marriage turns out to be made of strong stuff and eventually all is forgiven.

== Cast ==
- Kim van Kooten – Evelien
- Peter Blok – Harko
- Sterre Herstel – Regina
- Naomi van Es – Julia
- Olga Zuiderhoek – Agnes
- Genio de Groot – Gert
- Rifka Lodeizen – Sylvia
