= Lidia Sadowa =

Polish actress (born 1985)

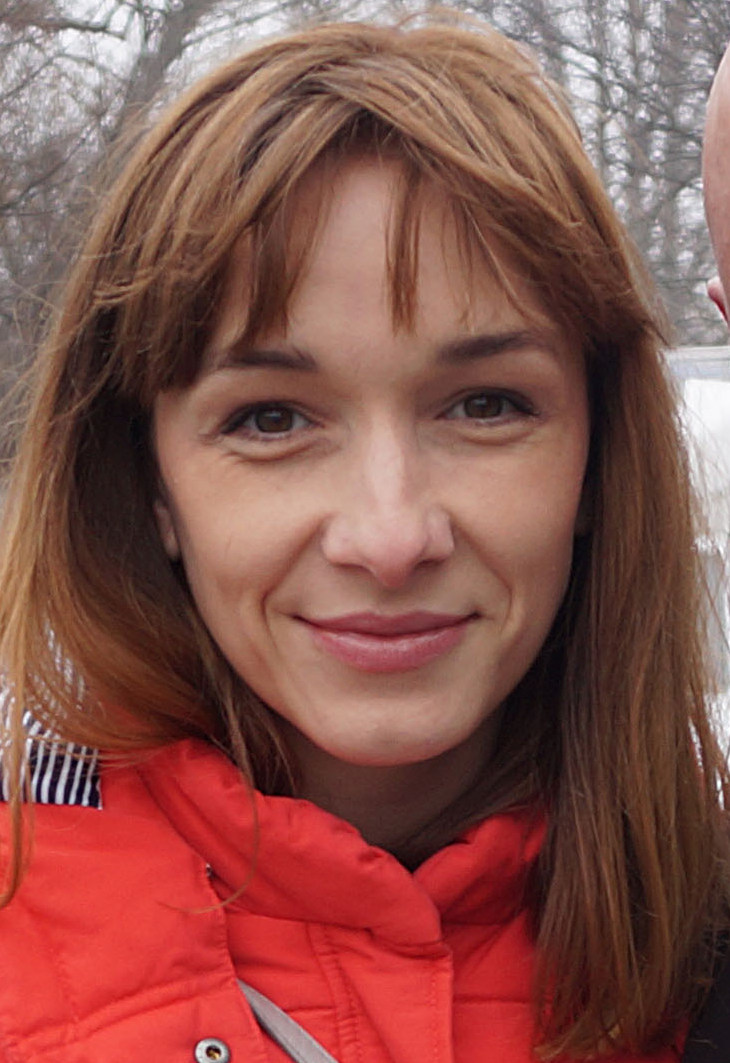
- Sadowa in 2017
- Born: 21 January 1985 (age 40); Sokołów Podlaski, Poland
- Education: National Academy of Dramatic Art
- Occupation: Actress
- Years active: 2007–present
- Spouse: Hubert Benedykciuk (m. 2014)
- Children: 3

Lidia Sadowa (Polish pronunciation: [ˈli.dja saˈdɔ.va]; born 21 January 1985) is a Polish actress.

== Biography ==
Sadowa was born in Sokołów Podlaski. She graduated from the National Academy of Dramatic Art in 2008. In 2010, she hosted a gala at the Gdynia Film Festival.

She married Hubert Benedykciuk in 2014. They have three sons.

== Filmography ==
=== Film ===
Year	Title	Role	Notes	Ref.
2010	Trzy minuty. 21:37	Daughter		
2011	80 Million	Kasia		
2013	Frozen	Elsa	Voice role; Polish dub	
2014	Penguins of Madagascar	Additional voices	Voice role; Polish dub	
2018	Nina	Iza		
2019	Sługi wojny	Kawecka		
2019	Frozen 2	Elsa	Voice role; Polish dub	
2021	Kraj	Daughter-in-law		
2022	Gdzie diabeł nie może, tam baby pośle	Jadzia		
2022	Doctor Strange in the Multiverse of Madness	Wanda Maximoff / Scarlet Witch	Voice role; Polish dub	
2023	Kiddo	Cousin Karina		
2023	Wonka	Mother	Voice role; Polish dub	
2024	Beetlejuice Beetlejuice	Lydia Deetz	Voice role; Polish dub	
2025	Autokar	Bat	Voice role; short film	

=== Television ===
Year	Title	Role	Notes	Ref.
2007–2022	Barwy szczęścia	Justyna Kwiatkowska	232 episodes	
2010	Ratownicy	Recorder	1 episode	
2010–2012	Szpilki na Giewoncie	Aneta	30 episodes	
2011–2016	Na dobre i na złe	Zosia Halicka; Ewa Bielecka	2 episodes	
2012	Littlest Pet Shop	Pepper Clark	Voice role; Polish dub	
2012	True Law	Pawlowska	1 episode	
2012–2016	The Ranch	Ola	19 episodes	
2013	Głęboka woda	Marzena	1 episode	
2015	Skazane	Witkowska	1 episode	
2016	Na noże	Edyta Majchrzak-Nowacka	7 episodes	
2019	O mnie się nie martw	Aldona	1 episode	
2019	Komisarz Alex	Police dog trainer	1 episode	
2019	Żmijowisko	Krystian's wife	3 episodes	
2019–2020	Our Century	Anna Lilpop	14 episodes	
2019–2024	Na Wspólnej	Iga Przybysz	411 episodes	
2021	Komisarz Mama	Malwina Leszko	1 episode	
2022	Bunt!	Małgorzata Jurgowicz	68 episodes	
2022	Angel of Death	Client	1 episode	
2023	Polowanie na ćmy	Wróblewska	3 episodes	
2023	Pati	Iwona Lisiecka	2 episodes	
2024	The Mire	Travel agent	1 episode	
2025	The Eastern Gate	Paulina Oginiec	1 episode	

=== Video games ===
Year	Title	Role	Notes	Ref.
2015	Until Dawn	Samantha "Sam" Giddings	Polish version	
2017	Sniper Ghost Warrior 3	Additional voices	Polish version	
2018	Gwent: Homecoming	Milva; Black Rayla	Polish version	
2018	Thronebreaker: The Witcher Tales	Black Rayla	Polish version	
2020	Cyberpunk 2077	V	Polish version	
