= Mirsad Tuka =

Bosnian actor (1965–2023)

- Born: 19 June 1965; Tuzla, SR Bosnia and Herzegovina, SFR Yugoslavia
- Died: 11 July 2023 (aged 58); Sarajevo, Bosnia and Herzegovina
- Resting place: Bare Cemetery, Sarajevo
- Education: Faculty of Dramatic Arts, Belgrade
- Occupation: Actor
- Years active: 1991–2023
- Spouse: Nerma Tuka (m. 1997)
- Children: 2

Mirsad Tuka (19 June 1965 – 11 July 2023) was a Bosnian actor. He made his film debut in the comedy-drama Holiday in Sarajevo (1991). He had since appeared in films such as Remake (2003), All for Free (2006), Cirkus Columbia (2010), The Abandoned (2010), Body Complete (2012), Ja sam iz Krajine, zemlje kestena (2013) and Take Me Somewhere Nice (2019).

Tuka also appeared in television series Složna braća (1996), Zabranjena ljubav (2005–2007) and, most notably, Lud, zbunjen, normalan (2008–2021) as police inspector Murga.

== Personal life and death ==
Tuka married his wife Nerma in 1997, and together they had two sons.

Tuka died in Sarajevo on 11 July 2023, at the age of 58. He was buried in Sarajevo two days later, at the Bare Cemetery on 13 July.

== Selected filmography ==
=== Film ===
Year	Title	Role	Notes
1991	Holiday in Sarajevo	Boro	
1995	Underground	Investigator	
2003	Remake	Vaso	
2006	All for Free	Policeman	
2010	Cirkus Columbia	Dragan	
2010	The Abandoned	Mirza Alijagić	
2012	Body Complete	Doctor	
2013	Ja sam iz Krajine, zemlje kestena	Zlatan	
2019	Take Me Somewhere Nice	Mechanic	

=== Television ===
Year	Title	Role	Notes
1996	Srećni ljudi		1 episode
1996	Složna braća	Sabe	1 episode
2004–2006	Crna hronika	Adem Kovačević	Main cast (200 episodes)
2005–2007	Zabranjena ljubav	Zlatko Fijan	Series regular (302 episodes)
2008–2021	Lud, zbunjen, normalan	Murga	14 episodes
2018–2021	Besa	Baždarević	9 episodes
