= Siberia (1998 film) =

- Theatrical release poster
- Directed by: Robert Jan Westdijk
- Written by: Robert Jan Westdijk; Jos Driessen
- Produced by: Clea de Koning
- Starring: Hugo Metsers; Roeland Fernhout; Vlatka Simac
- Cinematography: Bert Pot
- Edited by: Herman P. Koerts
- Music by: Junkie XL
- Production companies: Siberia Film; NPS
- Distributed by: Warner Bros.
- Release dates: 24 August 1998 (Amsterdam); 27 August 1998 (Netherlands)
- Running time: 87 minutes
- Country: Netherlands
- Languages: Dutch; English
- Budget: ƒ2,1 million ($1 million)

Siberia is a 1998 Dutch comedy film directed by Robert Jan Westdijk about a group of young Dutchmen who systematically rob tourists after having sex. Baywatch star Nicole Eggert has a cameo role in the film. The film was released on 27 August 1998 by Warner Bros. and attracted an attendance of around 54,000.

== Plot ==
Hugo and his best friend Goof have a special hobby, they bed foreign female backpackers in Amsterdam, and then run off with their backpacks. One of the friends finds it more fun to photograph their victims as a souvenir. When Goof falls in love with a foreign girl their hobby is in danger.

== Cast ==
- Hugo Metsers as Hugo
- Roeland Fernhout as Goof
- Vlatka Simac as Lara
- Nicole Eggert as Kristy
- Johnny Lion as Freddy
- Alessia Sorvillo as Angela
- Francesca Rizzo as Kika
- Nefeli Anthopoulou as Marina
- Syan Blake as Maggie
- Katja Dreyer as Kate
- Bente Jonker as Ute
- Jos ten Bosch as Clerk
- Elisabeth Estaras as Rough Girl

== Production ==
Principal photography took place around Amsterdam in 1997.

== Release ==
=== Critical response ===
The film received mixed reviews from critics.

=== Accolades ===
Accolades received by Siberia
Year	Award	Category	Recipient(s)	Result	Ref.
1998	Netherlands Film Festival	Golden Calf for Best Feature Film	Clea de Koning	Nominated	
