= Festival aan de Werf =

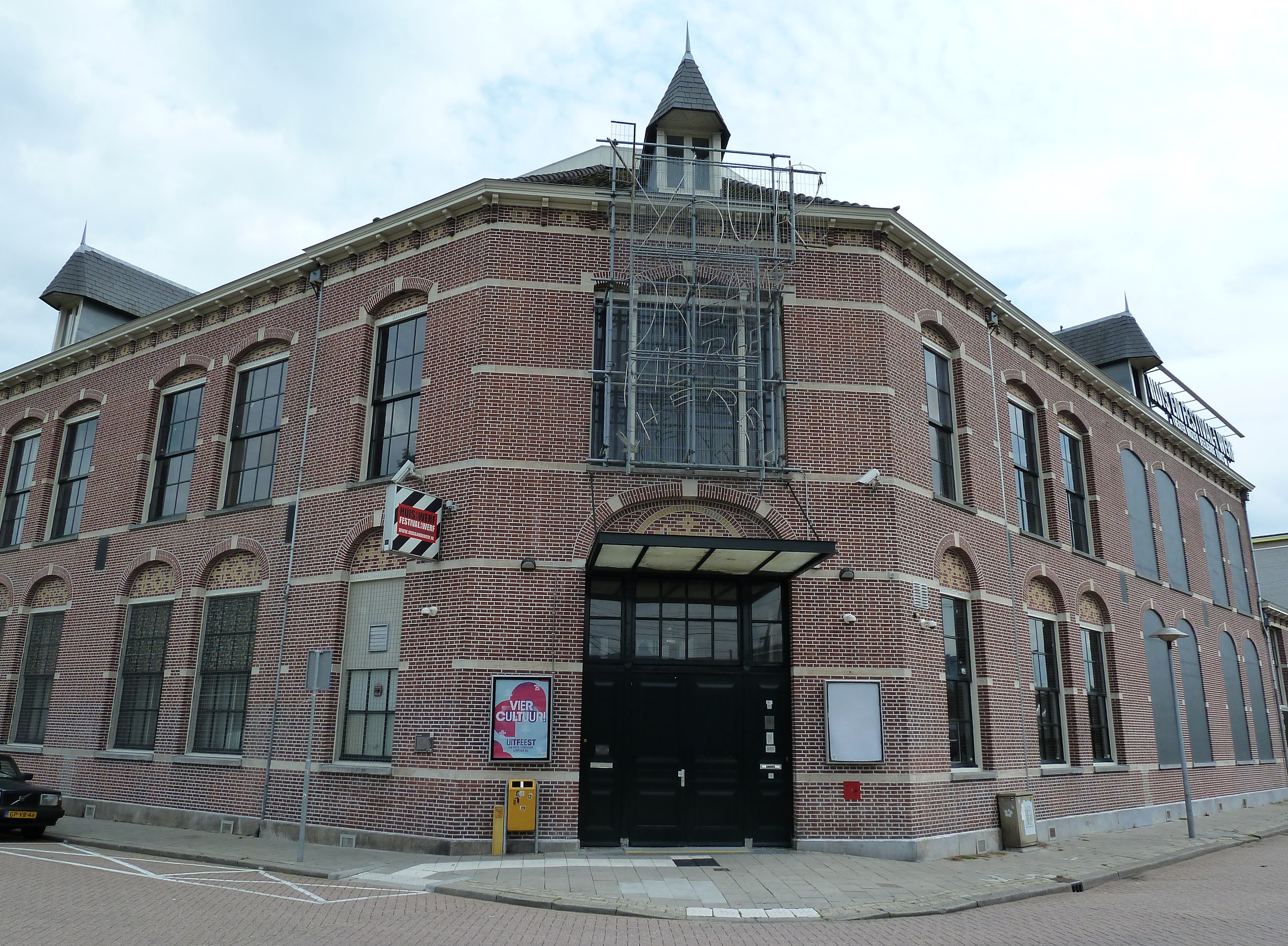
Huis a/d Werf

The Festival aan de Werf is a theater and visual arts festival that takes place every year in the city of Utrecht, Netherlands. The first edition of the festival took place in 1986, to celebrate the 350th anniversary of the Utrecht University. The first edition of the festival was a three-day event that took place in the Oudegracht. Current editions of the festival usually last ten and include music, visual arts, performances, and installations.
