= Golden Calf Development Prize =

Dutch film award

The Golden Calf Development Prize is awarded at the Netherlands Film Festival.

- 2007 Berend Boorsma, Roel Boorsma and San Fu Maltha - Milo
- 2005 Reinier Selen, Edwin van Meurs and Melinda Jansen - White Women
- 2004 Maria Uitdehaag, Jacqueline de Goeij and Ruud van der Heyde - Pol & Lot
- 2003 Ineke Houtman, Jan van der Zanden and Wilant Boekelman - When Night Falls
- 2002 Eugenie Jansen and Stienette Bosklopper - Calimucho
