= Golden Calf Special Jury Prize =

Dutch film award

The following is a list of winners of the Golden Calf Special Jury Prize at the Nederlands Film Festival.

- 2009 The whole team - Can Go Through Skin
- 2008 Willem de Beukelaer's Stunt Team (Willem de Beukelaer, Marco Maas, Ronald Schuurbiers)
- 2007 Halina Reijn and Fedja van Huêt - De prins en het meisje
- 2006 Mercedes Stalenhoef - Ik wil nooit beroemd worden
- 2005 The late Theo van Gogh - 06/05, Medea, and his work; and the late Willem van de Sande Bakhuyzen - Lepel, Leef!, and his work
- 2004 Albert ter Heerdt and Mimoun Oaïssa - Shouf Shouf Habibi!
- 2003 Peter Blok, Pierre Bokma, Gijs Scholten van Aschat, and Jaap Spijkers - Cloaca
- 2002 George Sluizer - Het stenen vlot, and all his work
- 2001 The whole team - Hertenkamp (TV series)
- 2000 Pieter van Huystee - 11 productions
- 1999 Ian Kerkhof - Shabondama Elegy
- 1998 Sonia Herman Dolz - Lagrimas Negras
- 1997 Arjan Ederveen - His work
- 1996 Hans Heijnen - De waterwolf van Itteren, Uncle Frank, Strike Out
- 1995 Jany Temine - Costumes
- 1994 Ariane Schluter - 06
- 1993 Peter Delpeut - The Forbidden Quest
- 1992 Thom Hoffman - De domeinen Ditvoorst, among his other work
- 1991 Pim de la Parra - All his work
- 1990 Felix de Rooy and Norman de Palm - Ava & Gabriel
- 1989 Anneke Blok - Uw mening graag
- 1988 Alejandro Agresti - Love Is a Fat Woman
- 1987 Will van Kralingen - Havinck
- 1986 Jos Stelling - De Wisselwachter
- 1985 Orlow Seunke - Pervola
- 1984 Eric de Kuyper - Naughty Boys
- 1983 Annette Apon - Giovanni, among her other work
