= Golden Calf for Best Cinematography =

Dutch film award

The following is a list of winners of the Golden Calf for best cinematography at the NFF. This category has been awarded since 2003

- 2026 Myrthe Mosterman - Truly Naked
- 2025 Frank van den Eeden – The Garden of Earthly Delights
- 2024 Lennert Hillege – Occupied City
- 2023 Emo Weemhoff – Sweet Dreams
- 2022 Martijn van Broekhuizen – Narcosis
- 2021 Lennert Hillege – The Forgotten Battle
- 2020 Myrthe Mosterman – Goud
- 2019 Jasper Wolf – Open Seas
- 2018 Lennert Hillege – Beyond Words
- 2017 Rogier Stoffers – Brimstone
- 2016 Frank van den Eeden – Full Contact
- 2015 Mark van Aller – Son of Mine
- 2014 Tibor Dingelstad – Helium
- 2013 Richard van Oosterhout – &ME
- 2012 Goert Giltay – The Girl and Death
- 2011 Jasper Wolf – Code Blue
- 2010 Lennert Hillege – R U There
- 2009 Daniël Bouquet – Nothing Personal
- 2008 Menno Westendorp – In Real Life
- 2007 Richard van Oosterhout – Wolfsbergen
- 2006 Thomas Doebele & Maarten Schmidt – Constant, Avant Le Départ
- 2005 Melle van Essen – Echoes Of War
- 2004 Erik van Empel – The Last Victory
- 2003 Bert Pot – Phileine Zegt Sorry

== Sources ==
- Golden Calf Awards (Dutch)
- NFF Website
