= Hardcore Never Dies =

2023 Dutch film directed by Jim Taihuttu

- Film poster
- Directed by: Jim Taihuttu
- Starring: Jim Deddes; Joes Brauers; Rosa Stil
- Release date: 9 November 2023 (Netherlands)
- Country: Netherlands
- Language: Dutch

Hardcore Never Dies is a 2023 Dutch crime drama film directed by Jim Taihuttu. The film won the Golden Film award after having sold 100,000 tickets. The film takes place during the gabber music scene in Rotterdam, Netherlands in the 1990s.

== Plot ==
The film follows brothers Michael, a gifted pianist working a manual labor job, and Danny, a gabber devotee and small-time drug dealer. Danny introduces Michael to gabber while coming up with increasingly dangerous schemes to repay an escalating debt to a local drug lord.

== Production ==
Jim Deddes, Joes Brauers and Rosa Stil play roles in the film. Principal photography began early 2023.

The film's trailer features the track "Ruffneck (still) rules the Hardcore scene" by Juggernaut a.k.a. DJ Ruffneck (Patrick van Kerckhoven), which itself is a variation of Edvard Grieg's "In the Hall of the Mountain King"; both songs interleave in the trailer.

Hardcore Never Dies is an original trademark and Record Label from Dance Concepts and they have approved the use of the name for this film. It's a brand name and music label of this event company with its own artists and merchandise.

== Reception ==
Algemeen Dagblad (AD) rated the film four stars and praised Jim Deddes for his role in the film, as well as director Jim Taihuttu. NRC rated the film three stars. Both AD and NRC described the crime plot as 'predictable'. Trouw rated the film two stars and described the film's crime plot as clichéd.

At the 2024 Netherlands Film Festival, the production team of Hardcore Never Dies won four Golden Calf awards: Gijs den Hartogh for Best Sound Design, Gino Taihuttu and Jiri Taihuttu for Best Music, Ben Zuydwijk for Best Production Design and Minke Lunter and John van Vlerken for Best Costume Design.
