= Goert Giltay =

Dutch camera operator

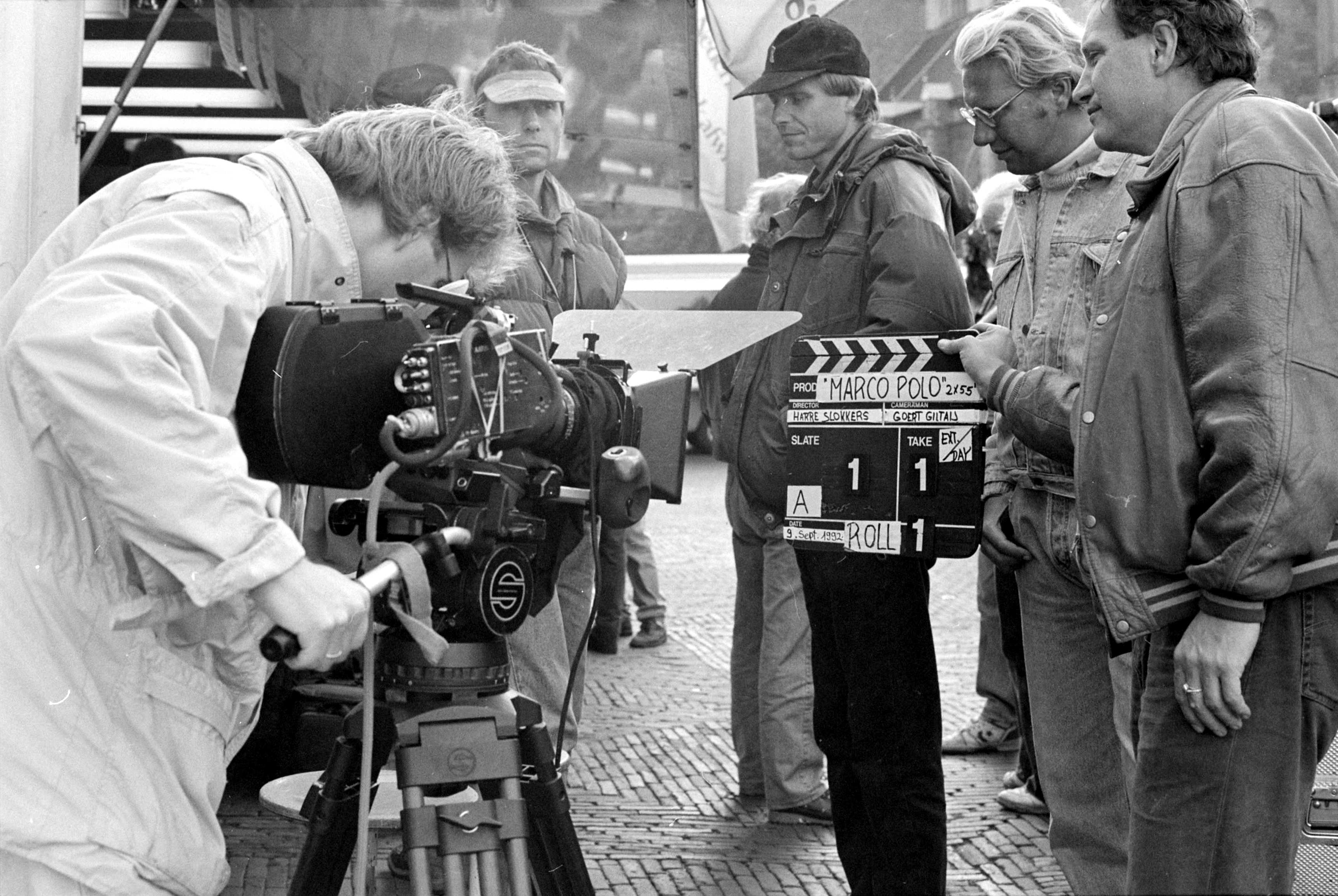
- Born: 3 March 1952 (age 74); Zandvoort
- Occupation: cinematographer
- Years active: 1978–present
- Awards: Golden Calf (1993, 2012)

Goert Giltay (born 3 March 1952) is a Dutch cinematographer.

Giltay graduated from the ArtEZ Academy of Visual Arts (1970–1971) и Netherlands Film Academy (1972–1976).

== Selected filmography ==
- The Pointsman (1986)
- Leedvermaak (1989)
- The Flying Dutchman (1995)
- No Trains No Planes (1999)
- Bluebird (2004)
- Duska (2007)
- The Girl and Death (2012) – Golden Calf for Best Photography winner
- Becoming Zlatan (2015)
- A Real Vermeer (2016)
