= Golden Calf for Best Director =

Dutch film award

The following is a list of winners of the Golden Calf for best Director at the NFF.

- 2026 Muriel d'Ansembourg - Truly Naked
- 2025 Morgan Knibbe - The Garden of Earthly Delights
- 2024 Michael Middelkoop - Dit is geen kerstfilm
- 2023 Ena Sendijarević - Sweet Dreams
- 2022 Mascha Halberstad - Knor
- 2021 Sabine Lubbe Bakker and Niels van Koevorden - Becoming Mona
- 2020 Mischa Kamp - Romy's Salon
- 2019 Sacha Polak - Dirty God
- 2018 Jaap van Heusden - In Blue
- 2017 Martin Koolhoven - Brimstone
- 2016 Boudewijn Koole - Beyond Sleep
- 2015 Remy van Heugten - Gluckauf
- 2014 Saskia Diesing - Nena
- 2013 Jim Taihuttu - Wolf
- 2012 Paula van der Oest - The Domino Effect
- 2011 Nanouk Leopold - Brownian Movement
- 2010 Rudolf van den Berg - Tirza
- 2009 Urszula Antoniak - Nothing Personal
- 2008 Joram Lürsen - Alles is Liefde
- 2007 Mijke de Jong - Stages (Tussenstand)
- 2006 Paul Verhoeven - Black Book (Zwartboek)
- 2005 Nanouk Leopold - Guernsey
- 2004 Eddy Terstall - Simon
- 2003 Pieter Kuijpers - Godforsaken (Van God los)
- 2002 Alejandro Agresti - Valentín
- 2001 Martin Koolhoven - The Cave (De grot)
- 2000 Jean van de Velde - Leak (Lek)
- 1999 Roel Reiné - The Delivery
- 1998 Karim Traïdia - The Polish Bride (De Poolse bruid)
- 1997 Rudolf van den Berg - For My Baby
- 1996 Theo van Gogh - Blind Date
- 1995 Marleen Gorris - Antonia
- 1994 Rosemarie Blank - Crossing Borders (Rit over de grens)
- 1993 Ben Sombogaart - The Pocket-knife (Het zakmes)
- 1992 Alex van Warmerdam - The Northerners (De noorderlingen)
- 1991 Frans Weisz - Bij nader inzien
- 1990 Frouke Fokkema - Vigour
- 1989 Frans Weisz - Polonaise
- 1988 Pieter Verhoeff - Count Your Blessings (Van geluk gesproken)
- 1987 Dick Maas - Flodder
- 1986 Alex van Warmerdam - Abel
- 1985 Paul Verhoeven - Flesh + Blood
- 1984 Rudolf van den Berg - Bastille
- 1983 Dick Maas - De lift

== Sources ==
- Golden Calf Awards (Dutch)
- NFF Website
