= Kiddo (film) =

- Berlinale release poster
- Directed by: Zara Dwinger
- Written by: Zara Dwinger; Nena van Driel
- Produced by: Layla Meijman
- Starring: Frieda Barnhard; Rosa van Leeuwen
- Cinematography: Douwe Hennink
- Edited by: Fatih Tura
- Music by: Jac van Exter
- Production company: Studio Ruba
- Distributed by: Gusto entertainment
- Release dates: 19 February 2023 (Berlinale); 5 July 2023 (Netherlands)
- Running time: 91 minutes
- Country: Netherlands
- Languages: Dutch; Polish; English

Kiddo is a 2023 Dutch drama road movie directed by Zara Dwinger (in her directorial debut) who co-wrote it with Nena van Driel. Starring Frieda Barnhard and Rosa van Leeuwen. It is about an absentee mother who snatches her daughter from her adoptive family to take her on a road trip to Poland to be together forever.

Kiddo had its world premiere on 19 February 2023, in the Generation Kplus section at the 73rd Berlin International Film Festival, where it competed for the Crystal Bear.

== Synopsis ==
Eleven-year-old Lu is living in a foster home when her long-lost mother Karina shows up unexpectedly and takes her on a wild road trip in a beat-up sports car - all the way to her grandma in Poland. Lu soon finds out it's all or nothing with Karina when she gets pulled into a Bonnie-and-Clyde-like fantasy. But reality quickly catches up, forcing them to decide what they're willing to do to stay together forever.

== Cast ==
The actors participating in this film are:

- Frieda Barnhard as Karina
- Rosa van Leeuwen as Lu
- Aisa Winter as Hennie
- Maksymilian Rudnicki as Grzegorz
- Lidia Sadowa as Cousin Karina
- Indy-Rose Kroonen as Stepsister
- Djayklin Lima as Adoptive brother

== Financing ==
The film received an financial support of €313,761 to develop the production.

== Release ==
Kiddo had its world premiere on 19 February 2023, in the Generation Kplus section at the 73rd Berlin International Film Festival. It was released commercially on 5 July 2023, in Dutch theaters.

== Accolades ==
Year	Award / Festival	Category	Recipient	Result	Ref.
2023	Berlin International Film Festival	Crystal Bear	Kiddo	Nominated	
2023	Cinema Jove - Valencia International Film Festival	Moon of Valencia Award - Best Feature Film	Kiddo	Nominated	
2023	Yerevan International Film Festival	Best Humanitarian Film - Special Mention	Kiddo	Won	
