= Golden Calf for Best Production Design =

Award category at the Nederlands Film Festival

The following is a list of winners of the Golden Calf for best Production Design at the Nederlands Film Festival. This category has been awarded since 2003.

- 2026 Fleur Ankoné - Truly Naked
- 2025 Bram Doyer - Fabula
- 2024 Ben Zuydwijk - Hardcore Never Dies
- 2023 Florian Legters - Zomervacht
- 2022 Masha Halberstad - Oink
- 2021 Hubert Pouille - The Forgotten Battle
- 2020 Anne Winterink - Marionette
- 2019 Kurt Loyens - Amsterdam Vice
- 2018 Harry Ammerlaan - The Resistance Banker
- 2017 Floris Vos - Brimstone
- 2016 Ben Zuydwijk - J. Kessels
- 2015 Hubert Pouille - The Surprise
- 2014 Alfred Schaaf - Hemel op aarde
- 2013 Lieke Scholman - Wolf
- 2012 Wilbert van Dorp - The Heineken Kidnapping
- 2011 Gert Brinkers - Dik Trom
- 2010 Vincent de Pater - Lang en gelukkig
- 2009 Floris Vos - Winter in Wartime
- 2008 Elsje de Bruijn - TBS
- 2007 Maarten Piersma – Nightwatching
- 2006 Gert Brinkers – Ober
- 2005 The production design-team of Lepel & Gert Brinkers – Lepel
- 2004 Marco Rooth – De Dominee
- 2003 Benedict Schillemans – Pietje Bell

== Sources ==
- Golden Calf Awards (Dutch)
- NFF Website
