= Golden Calf (award) =

Dutch film award

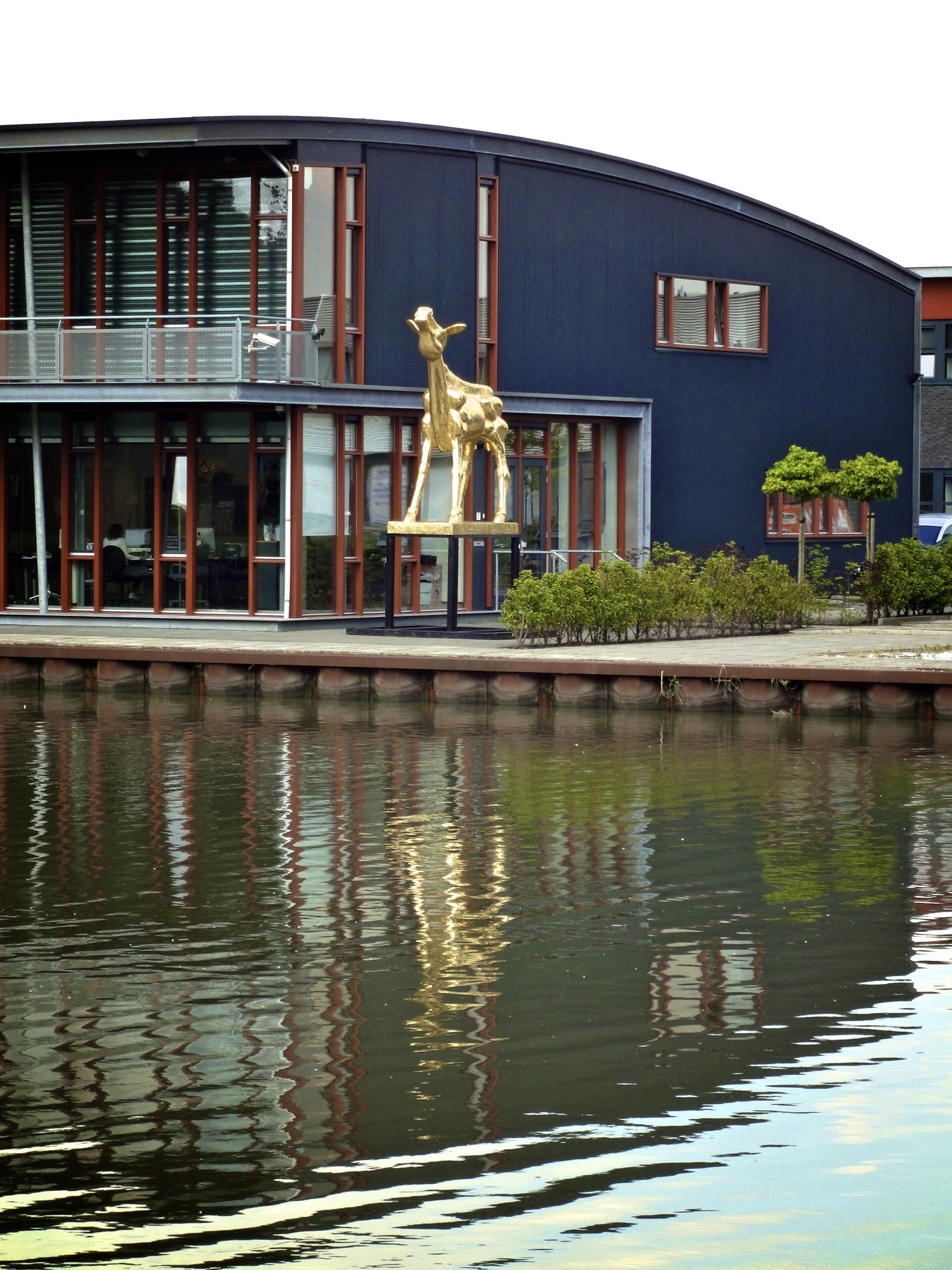
- Awarded for: Best in film and television programs
- Country: Netherlands
- Presented by: Nederlands Film Festival
- First award: 1981
- Website: http://www.filmfestival.nl/en

The Golden Calf (Dutch: Gouden Kalf) is the award of the Netherlands Film Festival, which is held annually in Utrecht. The award has been presented since 1981, originally in six categories: Best Actor, Best Actress, Best Feature Film, Best Short Film, Culture Prize and Honourable mention. In 2004, there were 16 award categories, mainly because in 2003 the categories Best Cinematography, Best Editing, Best Music, Best Production Design, Best Sound Design were added.

Famous Dutch film makers and actors that have won a Golden Calf include Rutger Hauer, Louis van Gasteren, Paul Verhoeven, Eddy Terstall, Carice van Houten, Felix de Rooy, Fons Rademakers, Martin Koolhoven, Alex van Warmerdam, Fedja van Huêt, Jean van de Velde, Pim de la Parra, Dick Maas, Marleen Gorris, Ian Kerkhof, Jeroen Krabbé, Monic Hendrickx, Rijk de Gooyer, Marwan Kenzari and Steve McQueen (director).

== Name and meaning ==
On the one hand, the name refers to an animal as is common in names of European film awards, such as the Golden Bear of the Berlin Film Festival and the Golden Lion of the Venice Film Festival -- cattle being one of the most common types of livestock in the Netherlands. On the other hand, the name of the award also refers to the book of Exodus in the Bible, where a golden statue of a calf was made by Aaron, which was later destroyed by Moses because God prohibits worshipping anything other than the One, True God. Jury member in 2002 Martin Koolhoven says the Dutch Calvinist culture is more relativizing than proud: "This is why the Golden Calf is such a good prize, because of the wink that is included. Other countries have golden lions and golden bears. We have a golden calf and after all it is sinful to worship it."

In 1995 Rijk de Gooyer threw his Golden Calf statuette on the street in the reality TV series Taxi (the Dutch version of Taxicab Confessions), when he was picked up by a taxi after a dissatisfying closing ceremony at the Netherlands Film Festival. In 1999 he let Maarten Spanjer, the host of Taxi, throw his Golden Calf for Scratches in the Table out of the window.

== Award categories ==
=== Film awards ===
- Culture Prize
- Best long feature film
- Best Director
- Best Script
- Best Leading Role
- Best Supporting Role
- Best Short film
- Best long documentary
- Best Short Documentary
- Best Cinematography
- Best Editing
- Best Music
- Best Production Design
- Best Sound Design
- Best Costume Design
- Best Hair & Make-Up
- Best Leading Role in a Short Film

=== TV awards ===
- Best Leading Role in a Television Drama
- Best Supporting Role in a Television Drama
- Best Television Drama
- Best Directing of a Dramaseries
- Best Screenplay of a Dramaseries

=== Interactive award ===
The Golden Calf Award for Best Interactive is a category presented since 2015. It is awarded to forms of interactive storytelling outside standard film and television like, for instance, VR films, video games, website design, webseries and social media projects.

The winners were:

- 2015: Refugee Republic - De Volkskrant/Submarinechannel
- 2016: The Modular Body - Floris Kaayk
- 2017: Horizon Zero Dawn - Guerrilla Games
- 2018: #DEARCATCALLERS - Noa Jansma
- 2019: Die Fernweh Oper - Daniel Ernst/The Shoebox Diorama
- 2020: Nerd Funk - Ali Eslami and Mamali Shafahi
- 2021: IVF-X: Posthuman Parenting in Hybrid Reality - Victorine van Alphen
- 2022: LAWKI (Life As We Know It) - ARK
- 2023: Dear Beloved Friend - Dries Verhoeven & Kininso Koncepts
- 2024: Luna Maurer - Luna Maurer
- 2025: Ancestors - Steye Hallema
- 2026: Graves’ End - Finn Stevenhagen

=== Special awards ===
- Special Jury Prize
- Public Prize
- Development Prize
- Awards only awarded once or twice are:
  - Best Film of the Century (1999) - Paul Verhoeven & Rob Houwer for Turks Fruit
  - Control Award (1994, 1992) - Cor Koppies (1994), J.Th. van Taalingen (1992)
  - Best Commercial (1990, 1991) - Todd Masters for Woonruimte gevraagd (1991), Trevor Wrenn for Hamka's (1990)
  - Best European Film (1994, 1995) - Kazimierz Kutz for Turned Back (1995), Jonathan Cavendisch & Tim Palmer for Into the West (1994)

=== Retired awards ===
- Occupation Award
- Honourable Mention
