= Cinema of the Netherlands =

- No. of screens: 806 (2012)
  - Per capita: 5.2 per 100,000 (2011)
- Main distributors: Warner Bros. 27.0% Universal Pictures International 16.6% Benelux Film Distributors (Bfd) 12.3% Sony Pictures 12.1%

Produced feature films (2011)
- Fictional: 55 (75.3%)
- Animated: –
- Documentary: 18 (24.7%)

Number of admissions (2012)
- Total: 30,600,000
  - Per capita: 1.8 (2012)
- National films: 4,800,000 (15.8%)

Gross box office (2012)
- Total: €244.6 million
- National films: €35.9 million (14.7%)

Cinema of the Netherlands refers to the film industry based in the Netherlands. Because the Dutch film industry is relatively small, and there is little or no international market for Dutch films, almost all films rely on state funding. This funding can be achieved through several sources, for instance through the Netherlands Film Fund or the public broadcast networks. In recent years the Dutch Government has established several tax shelters for private investments in Dutch films.

== Box office ==
In 2000 the total revenue coming from box office results in the Netherlands was €128.5 million; Dutch films had a share of 5.5%, which is €7.1 million. In 2006 the total revenue was €155.9 million; Dutch films had a share of 11.5%, which is €17.4 million. In 2025, the total revenue from box office results in the Netherlands was €308 million; Dutch films had a share of 14%, which is €43 million.

The Netherlands Film Festival and the Netherlands Film Fund are the initiators of four awards recognising box office achievements in the Netherlands. The awards are intended to generate positive publicity for a film when the media attention for the film's release has stopped. The Golden Film is awarded to films once they have sold 100,000 cinema tickets, the Platinum Film at 400,000 tickets, and the Diamond Film at 1,000,000 tickets. The Crystal Film is for documentary films from the Netherlands and is awarded once the film has sold 10,000 cinema tickets.

The most visited film in Dutch cinema history is Titanic, which attracted 3,405,708 visitors. Proportionately the most visited Dutch film is Turkish Delight which had 3,328,804 visitors in 1973, approximately a quarter of the entire population at the time. Titanic, by comparison, drew roughly one fifth of the population of the Netherlands in the late nineties.

== History ==
The first Dutch film was the slapstick comedy Gestoorde hengelaar (1896) by M.H. Laddé. Willy Mullens was one of the influential pioneers of Dutch cinema in the early 1900s. His short slapstick comedy The Misadventure of a French Gentleman Without Pants at the Zandvoort Beach is one of the oldest surviving Dutch fiction films.

Although the Dutch film industry is relatively small, there have been several active periods in which Dutch filmmaking thrived. The first boom came during the First World War when the Netherlands was one of the neutral states. Studios like Hollandia produced an impressive cycle of feature films. A second wave followed in the 1930s, as talking pictures led to a call for Dutch-spoken films, which resulted in a boom in production: between 1934 and 1940, 37 feature films were released. The film Dead Water (1934), directed by Gerard Rutten, won the Coppa Istituto Luce at the Venice Film Festival (1934), for best cinematography, which was the work of Andor von Barsy.

To accommodate the rapid growth, the Dutch film industry looked to foreign personnel experienced with sound film technology. Mostly these were Germans, or people who had worked in Germany, who fled the country after Hitler took power. Several renowned German directors who would go on to work in Hollywood directed films in the Netherlands in this period, most notably Douglas Sirk (Boefje, 1939) and Ludwig Berger (Ergens in Nederland, 1940).

During World War II, the private Dutch film industry came to a near halt. However, the German-led occupation government supported many small propaganda films in support of the Third Reich. The best-known of these were De nieuwe tijd breekt baan (A New Order Arises, 1941), Met Duitschland tegen het Bolsjewisme (With Germany against Bolshevism, 1941) and Werkt in Duitschland (Work in Germany, 1942). After 1943, this funding came to an end, due to internal struggles within the Dutch Kultuurkamer and the lack of money of the occupational government.

In 1946, the Dutch Historical Film Archive was founded, which would become the Nederlands Filmmuseum, today's Eye Filmmuseum. It has played an important role in the preservation and presentation of cinema in general, and Dutch cinema in particular. Its collection encompasses fiction and documentary film, as well as animation, amateur film, and experimental film. The latter has a rich tradition in the Netherlands, not unlike non-fiction film. Cinema newsreel collections, including the Polygoon journaal, state sponsored films, commissioned films, commercials, and (television) documentaries, besides other television productions, are being preserved at the Netherlands Institute for Sound and Vision.

=== The Dutch Documentary Tradition ===
The Documentary film of the Netherlands has been renowned worldwide, propelled first of all by the avant-garde from the 1920s and 1930s, in particular the Filmliga movement, with filmmakers such as Paul Schuitema, Mannus Franken, Andor von Barsy, and Joris Ivens. In the years directly following World War II, most effort was given to the reconstruction of the country, and filmmaking was largely related to that purpose. In that period, the so-called Dutch Documentary School (or Dutch Documentary Tradition) emerged. New filmmakers came to the fore, who received critical acclaim, such as Herman van der Horst, Bert Haanstra, and John Fernhout, among others.

Van der Horst was successful with his short film Steady! (Houen Zo!), about the reconstruction of Rotterdam, which won a Golden Palm at the Cannes Film Festival in 1953, while Van der Horst became also known for his film Faja Lobbi (1960), about life in Suriname, along de Marowijne river, which won a Golden Bear at the Berlinale. Haanstra, in his turn, established his name with Glass (1958), a short about the production of glass, which also won prizes in Berlin and Cannes, as well as an Academy Award for Documentary Short Subject. John Fernhout directed Sky Over Holland, about the country and its connection to visual art, made for the World Exhibition in Montreal in 1967. It was a major attraction, which also won a Golden Palm at the Cannes Film Festival and was nominated for an Academy Award for Documentary Short Subject.

Many other filmmakers came to the fore in the 1960s, eager to explore new pathways and to experiment with film as a medium, supported by broadcasting stations such as VPRO. Among them were the filmmakers and photographers Jan Schaper, Ed van der Elsken and most notably Johan van der Keuken, who had a major impact on Dutch documentary history.

In the same period, Joris Ivens continued to direct films, across the world, for example in Chile and Vietnam, but also in the Netherlands, where he made Rotterdam-Europoort (1966). By that time, Ivens had become the most famous filmmaker from the Netherlands, and he had won many prizes, among them a César Award and a Golden Lion, as well as a career achievement award at the Venice Film Festival. Ivens inspired many other people, including militant filmmakers, such as At van Praag, who established Cineclub Vrijheidsfilms (1966-1986). It produced and distributed films that showed a reality not shown by mainstream media. This critical engagement with cinema became a larger movement, with various other initiatives and politically oriented film collectives, such as the Amsterdams Stadsjournaal (ASJ, 1974-1984), following the example of Newsreel. Several prominent filmmakers started their career in this context, among them Annette Apon, or followed in their footsteps, such as René Scholten and Digna Sinke. A new documentary circuit emerged, which continued to grow over the years, with influential directors such as Heddy Honigmann and Jos de Putter (who also played a pivotal role at VPRO).

Documentary film remains important nowadays within the Dutch film industry and the broader media landscape. The International Documentary Film Festival Amsterdam, held annually in November, has been a major force in this regard too, being one of the largest documentary film festivals in the world.

=== Flourishing period ===
In the late 1950s, the film industry in the Netherlands expanded and professionalized, and more resources became available, also for features films. The Nederlands Filmfonds (Netherlands Film Fund) was established in 1957, and the Nederlandse Filmacademie (Netherlands Film Academy) was established in 1958. Bert Haanstra made his first fiction film in 1958, Fanfare, which was a big success. The most famous director of this era is undoubtedly Fons Rademakers, who received critical acclaim in the Netherlands and abroad with a number of films made between 1959 and 1963. Rademakers learned the business from Vittorio De Sica and Jean Renoir and brought his newfound knowledge of foreign art films with him.

The first generation of Dutch filmmakers who graduated from the Dutch Film Academy began to make a name for themselves, among them Frans Bromet, Frans Weisz, and Pieter Verhoeff. While documentary production remained important, Dutch fiction films became gradually more popular in the Netherlands.

A lasting success for Dutch film came in the 1970s, mostly under the influence of Paul Verhoeven. Verhoeven's five films of the decade – Business Is Business (Wat zien ik?, 1971), Turkish Delight (Turks Fruit, 1973), Katie Tippel (Keetje Tippel, 1975), Soldier of Orange (Soldaat van Oranje, 1977) and Spetters (1980) – were box-office hits; they are still in the top-twenty most successful Dutch films ever. Turkish Delight and Soldier of Orange were successful abroad as well and eventually led to Verhoeven's Hollywood career. In 2006 Verhoeven returned to his own language and made Black Book (Zwartboek), his first Dutch spoken film since The Fourth Man (1983).

Other successful directors from this era are Wim Verstappen and Pim de la Parra, whose movies were more commercial than those of their colleagues in the 1960s. In his book Van Fanfare tot Spetters, film historian Hans Schoots argues that the flourishing period of Dutch film lies between these two films, ending with the controversial Spetters, after which the happy era that was the seventies was over, and a more down-to-earth approach to filmmaking kicked in. Indeed, after 1980, few Dutch films managed to bring crowds of millions to the cinemas, partly due to a decline in interest, partly due to home video systems which resulted in an overall drop in cinema attendance in the Netherlands.

=== Family movies ===
More consistently successful, especially at the box office, are children's novels adaptations. Modern Dutch family movies follow in the tradition of Henk van der Linden – who made 38 youth films between 1952 and 1984 – and Karst van der Meulen who made twelve of them in the seventies and eighties. 1998's The Flying Liftboy and 1999's Little Crumb were the highest grossing domestic films of these years. Miss Minoes (2001), Peter Bell: The Movie (2002), De Schippers van de Kameleon (2002), Tow Truck Pluck (2004) and De Kameleon 2 (2005) achieved the same in their respective years. The Dutch children's films also got some international critical claim. For instance, Winky's Horse won awards at six foreign film festivals. This prompted producers to make an internationally oriented, big budget (approximately €12 million) family film, Crusade in Jeans. While a Dutch production, the film had an international cast and was shot in English.

The family oriented films' reign at the top of the domestic box office came to an end in 2006 with Paul Verhoeven's war thriller Black Book, which was the first Dutch film since Kruimeltje to get over a million admissions. Black Book was the most expensive Dutch film production of all time, with a reported budget of just under €18 million. The success was bested only one year later, with the romantic comedy Love Is All.

=== Decline ===
A decline in cinema admission set in after the 1970s. Director Dick Maas, making studio-style action-thrillers such as De Lift (1983) and Amsterdamned (1988), was about the only filmmaker having mainstream success in this period. He topped the box office charts with his dysfunctional family comedy Flodder (1986) and its sequel Flodder in Amerika (1992), the latter getting nearly one and a half million admissions, making it the most successful Dutch film since the introduction of the VCR. Some more artistic directors, such as Jos Stelling, Orlow Seunke and Alex van Warmerdam made magic realism movies. Other auteur-directors emerged during this era as well, including Theo van Gogh, Ate de Jong and more recently Cyrus Frisch. In this decade, acclaimed director Fons Rademakers won an Academy Award for Best Foreign Film with 1986's The Assault.

The cinematic adaptation of the novel, For a Lost Soldier, starring Maartin Smit and Canadian actor Andrew Kelley, was released in 1992 and has sparked controversy for its portrayal of a relationship between an adult male soldier and an 11-year old boy.

In the mid-1990s, the Dutch government introduced tax shelters (the so-called 'CV-regeling') to encourage private investments in Dutch films. After implementation of these new rules there was a boom in production of Dutch movies. It was not the movies made through the tax shelter however, but rather movies aimed at a young audience, such as Costa! (2001), that won back the confidence in the commercial viability of Dutch film. Costa! is about Dutch teenagers vacationing at the Spanish coast. The success of the film spawned several copycat films (for instance Volle Maan (Full Moon Party; 2002)) and a spin-off sitcom (also called Costa!), which ran for several seasons on the public broadcasting network BNN.

After a while the formula wore down and the new commercial flavor became films with a multicultural feel. Hush Hush Baby (Shouf Shouf Habibi, 2004) and Schnitzel Paradise (Het Schnitzelparadijs, 2005) were both comedies featuring Dutch/Moroccan actors and became a commercial success. The difference with Volle Maan is that the films were also acclaimed by critics (both in the Netherlands as internationally) and both films were shown at the Berlin Film Festival.

=== Recent history (since 2010) ===
In 2013 Alex van Warmerdam's film Borgman premiered In-Competition at the Cannes Film Festival. With this he became the second Dutch director ever to be nominated for the Palme d'Or.

In 2015, 1572: The Battle of Harlem, was released and is currently available for free streaming on Amazon Prime Video. The film tells the true story of a women-led rebellion against the forces of Spanish King Philip II during the Eighty Years' War.

== Dutch filmmakers and actors abroad ==
The most successful Dutch actors in Hollywood are Rutger Hauer (Blade Runner), Jeroen Krabbé (The Fugitive), Famke Janssen (X-Men), and Carice van Houten (Game of Thrones). Filmmakers besides Paul Verhoeven who successfully began a career in Hollywood include Jan de Bont (who started as cinematographer before directing big budget action movies like Speed and Twister), screenwriter-turned-director Menno Meyjes (credits include The Color Purple and Indiana Jones and the Last Crusade) and producer Pieter Jan Brugge (Glory, Consenting Adults, The Pelican Brief, Bulworth, The Insider, Miami Vice, Defiance, Love and Other Drugs. Brugge produced and directed The Clearing. After directing two English-language movies in the Netherlands, director Roel Reiné moved to Hollywood where he became an influential director-producer of Straight-to-DVD films, including the Steven Seagal-vehicle Pistol Whipped (2008). Ate de Jong made a couple of low budget American films in the early nineties and directed an episode of Miami Vice. In 2007 director Anton Corbijn made Control which premiered at the Cannes Film Festival. Other films he directed are A Most Wanted Man and The American.

=== 1980–2000 ===
In the 1980s and 1990s few other Dutch actors had the international success of Hauer and Krabbé. Their contemporaries Monique van de Ven, Derek de Lint, Renée Soutendijk and Huub Stapel all returned to making Dutch films when their Hollywood-efforts proved disappointing. Actress Van de Ven of Turkish Delight-fame moved to the US with her then-husband Jan de Bont and appeared in a number of small American films, to no significant success. De Lint's booked guest appearances in various TV shows like NYPD Blue and The L Word, and a number of supporting roles in theatrical movies, of which the most prominent was The Unbearable Lightness of Being (1988). Soutendijk played the female lead in Eve of Destruction (1991) and Huub Stapel, star of all of Dick Maas' box office hits, had a supporting role in a 1988 TV-movie about Anne Frank.

In 1992, the coming-of-age romantic drama film, Voor een Verloren Soldaat, starring Krabbé and Maarten Smit was released.

=== 2000–2020 ===
In the early 2000s actor Antonie Kamerling played in the American independent film Five Fingers in which, ironically, American actor Ryan Phillippe plays the leading Dutch character. Kamerling also had a supporting part in Exorcist: The Beginning. Actrice Thekla Reuten, star of Oscar-nominated Twin Sisters, made her US-debut in Highlander: The Source. Films like In Bruges, In Transit and The American soon followed. She also had a supporting role in Season 2 of Sleeper Cell and a small role in Lost.

As the decade progressed, actor Yorick van Wageningen made a name for himself by appearing in Beyond Borders (2003), The Chronicles of Riddick (2004) and The New World (2005). These films were to be preceded by a supporting role in Steven Spielberg's Minority Report but due to problems with his visa, he was unable to work on that movie. Contrary to most other Dutch actors successful in Hollywood, Van Wageningen was not a major star in his own country before playing in American films. Likewise, Saskia Mulder (sister to model Karen Mulder) made her debut abroad appearing in French and English films and television series. She had roles in The Beach, The Descent and The Descent: Part 2. She also was a series regular in the Scottish sitcom The Book Group.

In early 2010 a new wave of film talent made its way to international success. Talents to emerge during the decade included Marwan Kenzari, Lotte Verbeek, Sylvia Hoeks and Michiel Huisman.

Soon after Kenzari made his breakthrough in the Dutch film Wolf he made his US debut in the film Collide with Anthony Hopkins. Films like Ben-Hur, The Mummy and Murder on the Orient Express soon followed. In 2017 it was announced that Kenzari would play the villain Jafar in Disney's live-action adaptation of Aladdin. Lotte Verbeek booked success playing in international television shows like The Borgias, Outlander, The Blacklist and Marvel's Agent Carter. She also had a role in movie The Last Witch Hunter alongside Vin Diesel. In the early 2010s Sylvia Hoeks played in the films The Girl and Death and The Best Offer. And in 2017 Hoeks was cast the replicant Luv in the science fiction film Blade Runner 2049. Michiel Huisman appeared in The Young Victoria, World War Z and The Age of Adaline. From 2014 till 2016 he played the role of Daario Naharis on Game of Thrones.

Behind the scenes, cameraman Theo van de Sande, born in Tilburg, has made an impressive CV filming big budget films, having shot films such as Cruel Intentions and Blade, after he previously had a worthy career in his native country. Other Dutch individuals with international credits include Hollywood sound designer Charles Deenen; Oscar-winning director Marleen Gorris who made a number of international productions including the 1997 adaptation of Mrs Dalloway and currently works on several British productions; DJ and composer Junkie XL who wrote additional music for Ridley Scott's Kingdom of Heaven and scored the action film DOA: Dead or Alive; Sylvia Kristel, most famous for her role as Emmanuelle in a series of softcore movies, also appeared in a large number of lesser known American (TV-)movies, of which The Nude Bomb, a feature film adaptation of the TV-series Get Smart is probably the most notable. Kristel briefly appears as Agent 34; an established cinematographer in the alternative film scene, Curaçao-born Robby Müller has repeatedly worked with Wim Wenders, Lars von Trier and Jim Jarmusch; a director at the start of his career, Kees van Oostrum has moved to US to become a prolific cinematographer on various TV-movies and miniseries; two-time Academy Awards nominated production designer Jan Roelfs, who worked with Andrew Niccol and Oliver Stone; George Sluizer made an American remake of his popular cult hit Spoorloos, worked on pan-European co-productions and the Rob Schneider-comedy The Chosen One (2009); cameraman Rogier Stoffers, who shot a number of US box office hits in the 2000s, most notably Disturbia; tall man Carel Struycken, whose physique landed him the parts of Lurch in Barry Sonnenfeld's The Addams Family films and The Giant in Twin Peaks; Jany Temime was costume designer on the last three Harry Potter films, In Bruges and Children of Men; Arjen Tuiten, a special make-up effects artist working for the Stan Winston Studio, with Pan's Labyrinth as one of his prominent credits; Dutch born costume designer Elsa Zamparelli, who received an Oscar nomination for Dances with Wolves.

In 2016, Martin Koolhoven directed Brimstone, his first international film (with international stars). The dark and violent western/thriller was first shown in competition at the Venice Film Festival and was very well received in Europe, yet got mixed reviews in The United States. Dutch photographer Anton Corbijn made his film debut directing the British biopic Control about Joy Division lead singer Ian Curtis.

=== Acclaimed Dutch directors ===
- Hany Abu-Assad, Two time Academy Award for Best Foreign Language Film-nominee. Born in Israel, Dutch/Palestinian
- Jan de Bont, Cinematographer turned director
- Anton Corbijn, Photographer turned director
- Mike van Diem, Academy Award for Best Foreign Language Film-winner
- Ed van der Elsken, documentary-maker and photographer
- Theo van Gogh, director
- Marleen Gorris, Academy Award for Best Foreign Language Film-winner
- Bert Haanstra, Academy Award for Documentary Short Subject-winner
- Heddy Honigmann, documentary director
- Joris Ivens, documentary-maker
- Johan van der Keuken, documentary-maker and photographer
- Martin Koolhoven, contemporary auteur director, commercially and artistically successful in many genres
- Pieter Kuijpers, contemporary director, most successful in the crime/thriller genre
- Nanouk Leopold, contemporary arthouse director
- Joram Lürsen, director of recent mainstream movies
- Dick Maas, director of local blockbusters in the 1980s and 1990s.
- Fons Rademakers, Academy Award for Best Foreign Language Film-winner
- Digna Sinke, director and producer
- Jos Stelling, director of stylized movies
- Eddy Terstall, auteur director of dialogue-driven low-budget comedies
- Jean van de Velde, director of mainstream films
- Paul Verhoeven, successful and often controversial director, who also worked in Hollywood
- Alex van Warmerdam, auteur director of absurdist comedies, Palme d'Or nominee
- Cyrus Frisch, writer-director

== Successful Dutch films ==
As of 24 November 2008, the top-15 most visited Dutch films since 1945 were:

1. Turks Fruit (Turkish Delight, 1973) – 3,328,804
2. Fanfare (1958) – 2,635,178
3. Ciske de Rat (1955) – 2,432,500
4. Wat zien ik? (Business Is Business, 1971) – 2,358,946
5. Blue Movie (nl) (1971) – 2,335,301
6. Flodder (1986) – 2,313,701
7. Gooische Vrouwen (2011) – 1,919,982
8. Keetje Tippel (Katie Tippel, 1975) – 1,829,116
9. Alleman (1963) – 1,664,645
10. Ciske de Rat (1984) – 1,593,311
11. Soldaat van Oranje (Soldier of Orange, 1977) – 1,547,183
12. Flodder in Amerika (1992) – 1,493,873
13. De Overval (The Silent Raid, 1962) – 1,474,306
14. Alles is Liefde (Love Is All, 2007) 1,292,682

== Academy Awards nominations and wins ==
The winning films are marked with blue in this list of Academy Award nominated films.

| Year | Film title | Award category |
|---|---|---|
| 1942 | High Stakes in the East | Documentary |
| 1959 | Glass (Glas) | Documentary Short Subject |
| 1959 | The Village on the River (Dorp aan de rivier) | Best Foreign Language Film |
| 1962 | Big City Blues | Live Action Short Film |
| 1962 | Pan | Live Action Short Film |
| 1964 | The Human Dutch (Alleman) | Documentary Feature |
| 1967 | Sky over Holland | Live Action Short Film |
| 1971 | Adventures in Perception | Documentary Short Subject |
| 1972 | Ape and Super-Ape (Bij de beesten af) | Documentary Feature |
| 1972 | This Tiny World (Deze kleine wereld) | Documentary Short Subject |
| 1973 | Turkish Delight (Turks fruit) | Best Foreign Language Film |
| 1978 | Oh My Darling | Animated Short Film |
| 1986 | Anna & Bella | Animated Short Film |
| 1986 | The Assault (De aanslag) | Best Foreign Language Film |
| 1995 | Antonia's Line (Antonia) | Best Foreign Language Film |
| 1997 | Character (Karakter) | Best Foreign Language Film |
| 1999 | 3 Misses | Animated Short Film |
| 2000 | Father and Daughter | Animated Short Film |
| 2002 | Hotel Paraiso (Zus & zo) | Best Foreign Language Film |
| 2003 | Twin Sisters (De tweeling) | Best Foreign Language Film |
Source: The Official Academy Awards Database.

== Film festivals ==
There are three large film festivals in the Netherlands:

- The International Film Festival Rotterdam (IFFR) is a film festival for independent, innovative and experimental cinema and visual arts. The international festival is held since 1972 in Rotterdam. During the festival the Tiger Awards are awarded to starting filmmakers.
- The Nederlands Film Festival (NFF) has been the annual film festival for Dutch film productions since 1981. The seven-day festival is held in the end of September and early October in Utrecht. Dutch films from the previous year are shown, and the Golden Calves are awarded to the best films, best actors and best other crew members judged by an independent and professional jury.
- The International Documentary Film Festival Amsterdam (IDFA) is one of the world's largest documentary festivals. It is held since 1988 in Amsterdam.

There are several smaller film festivals in the Netherlands, and several of them are held in Amsterdam. These festivals are either local festivals or festivals specialized in films of a specific genre (e. g. fantastic films), for/about a specific target group (e. g. films for/about deaf people), or from a specific region (e. g. Japanese films).

- The Architecture Film Festival Rotterdam (AFFR) is a festival for both documentary and fiction related to architecture and urbanism.
- The Beeld voor Beeld Festival in the Amsterdam Tropenmuseum is a documentary film festival with a main focus on Ethnographic film. Beeld voor Beeld is member of CAFFE - Coordinating Anthropological Film Festivals in Europe.
- The KLIK! Amsterdam Animation Festival is an annual event which take place at the Eye Film Institute Netherlands. This international festival focus on short animated film with a main focus on contemporary animation.
- ShortCutz Amsterdam is an annual film festival promoting short films in Amsterdam. Professional filmmakers and actors like Rutger Hauer, Roel Reine, Tygo Gernandt and Eddy Terstall personally review the films and cast their vote for the winners at the ShortCutz Amsterdam Annual Awards, held every year at Eye Film Institute.

== See also ==
- Golden Calf Awards, hosted by the Dutch Film Festival, are the Dutch equivalent of the Academy Awards.
- List of Dutch films
- List of Dutch actors
- List of Dutch film directors
- List of cinema of the world
- World cinema
  - Cinema of Europe
