= List of Dutch Academy Award winners and nominees =

This is a list of Dutch Academy Award winners and nominees. This list details Dutch films and Dutch people who have either been nominated for or won an Academy Award.

== Best Actress in a Supporting Role ==
Academy Award for Best Supporting Actress
| Year | Name | Film | Status | Milestone / Notes | Ref. |
|---|---|---|---|---|---|
| 1954 | Nina Foch | Executive Suite | Nominated | | |

== Best Animated Feature ==
Academy Award for Best Animated Feature
| Year | Name | Film | Status | Milestone / Notes | Ref. |
|---|---|---|---|---|---|
| 2016 | Michaël Dudok de Wit | The Red Turtle | Nominated | Shared with Toshio Suzuki | |

== Best Animated Short Film ==
Academy Award for Best Animated Short Film
| Year | Name | Film | Status | Milestone / Notes | Ref. |
|---|---|---|---|---|---|
| 1977 | Co Hoedeman | The Sand Castle | Won | | |
| 1978 | Nico Crama | Oh My Darling | Nominated | | |
| 1985 | Cilia van Dijk | Anna & Bella | Won | | |
| 1986 | Willem Thijssen | A Greek Tragedy | Won | Shared with Linda Van Tulden | |
| 1994 | Michaël Dudok de Wit | The Monk and the Fish | Nominated | | |
| 1999 | Paul Driessen | 3 Misses | Nominated | | |
| 2000 | Michaël Dudok de Wit | Father and Daughter | Won | | |
| 2014 | Joris Oprins | A Single Life | Nominated | | |
| 2024 | Nina Gantz; Stienette Bosklopper | Wander to Wonder | Nominated | | |

== Best Cinematography ==
Academy Award for Best Cinematography
| Year | Name | Film | Status | Milestone / Notes | Ref. |
|---|---|---|---|---|---|
| 2017 | Hoyte van Hoytema | Dunkirk | Nominated | | |
| 2023 | Hoyte van Hoytema | Oppenheimer | Won | | |

== Best Costume Design ==
Academy Award for Best Costume Design
| Year | Name | Film | Status | Milestone / Notes | Ref. |
|---|---|---|---|---|---|
| 1990 | Elsa Zamparelli | Dances with Wolves | Nominated | | |
| 2003 | Dien van Straalen | Girl with a Pearl Earring | Nominated | | |

== Best Documentary Feature ==
Academy Award for Best Documentary Feature
| Year | Name | Film | Status | Milestone / Notes | Ref. |
|---|---|---|---|---|---|
| 1942 | The Netherlands Information Bureau | High Stakes in the East | Nominated | | |
| 1964 | Bert Haanstra | The Human Dutch (Alleman) | Nominated | | |
| 1972 | Bert Haanstra | Ape and Super-Ape (Bij de beesten af) | Nominated | | |
| 2024 | Daan Milius | Soundtrack to a Coup d'Etat | Nominated | Shared with Johan Grimonprez and Rémi Grellety | |

== Best Documentary Short ==
Academy Award for Best Documentary (Short Subject)
| Year | Name | Film | Status | Milestone / Notes | Ref. |
|---|---|---|---|---|---|
| 1959 | Bert Haanstra | Glass (Glas) | Won | | |
| 1971 | Han van Gelder | Adventures in Perception | Nominated | | |
| 1972 | Charles & Martina Huguenot van der Linden | This Tiny World (Deze kleine wereld) | Won | | |

== Best International Feature Film ==
Best International Feature Film
| Year | Director | Film | Status | Milestone / Notes | Ref. |
|---|---|---|---|---|---|
| 1959 | Fons Rademakers | The Village on the River (Dorp aan de rivier) | Nominated | | |
| 1973 | Paul Verhoeven | Turkish Delight (Turks Fruit) | Nominated | | |
| 1986 | Fons Rademakers | The Assault (De aanslag) | Won | | |
| 1995 | Marleen Gorris | Antonia's Line (Antonia) | Won | | |
| 1997 | Mike van Diem | Character (Karakter) | Won | | |
| 2002 | Paula van der Oest | Zus & Zo | Nominated | | |
| 2003 | Ben Sombogaart | Twin Sisters (De tweeling) | Nominated | | |

== Best Live Action Short Film ==
Academy Award for Live Action Short Film
| Year | Name | Film | Status | Milestone / Notes | Ref. |
|---|---|---|---|---|---|
| 1962 | Charles & Martina Huguenot van der Linden | Big City Blues | Nominated | | |
| 1962 | Herman van der Horst | Pan | Nominated | | |
| 1967 | John Fernhout | Sky Over Holland | Nominated | | |
| 2024 | Victoria Warmerdam; Trent | I'm Not a Robot (Ik ben geen robot) | Won | | |

== Best Makeup and Hairstyling ==
Academy Award for Best Makeup and Hairstyling
| Year | Name | Film | Status | Milestone / Notes | Ref. |
|---|---|---|---|---|---|
| 2017 | Arjen Tuiten | Wonder | Nominated | | |
| 2019 | Arjen Tuiten | Maleficent: Mistress of Evil | Nominated | Shared with Paul Gooch and David White. | |

== Best Picture ==
Academy Award for Best Picture
| Year | Name | Film | Status | Milestone / Notes | Ref. |
|---|---|---|---|---|---|
| 1999 | Pieter Jan Brugge | The Insider | Nominated | Shared with Michael Mann | |

== Best Production Design ==
Academy Award for Best Production Design
| Year | Name | Film | Status | Milestone / Notes | Ref. |
|---|---|---|---|---|---|
| 1993 | Jan Roelfs; Ben van Os | Orlando | Nominated | | |
| 1997 | Jan Roelfs | Gattaca | Nominated | Shared with Nancy Nye | |
| 2003 | Ben van Os; Cecile Heideman | Girl with a Pearl Earring | Nominated | | |

== Best Visual Effects ==
Academy Award for Best Visual Effects
| Year | Name | Film | Source Material | Status | Milestone / Notes |
|---|---|---|---|---|---|
| 2013 | Erik-Jan de Boer | Life of Pi | The novel Life of Pi | Won | |

== Best Writing – Adapted Screenplay ==
Best Adapted Screenplay
| Year | Name | Film | Source Material | Status | Milestone / Notes |
|---|---|---|---|---|---|
| 1985 | Menno Meyjes | The Color Purple | The novel The Color Purple by Alice Walker | Nominated | |

== Special awards ==
Academy Honorary Award
| Year | Name | Film | Notes |
|---|---|---|---|
| 1939 | Jan Domela | Spawn of the North | Part of the team awarded a Special Achievement Award "for outstanding achievement in creating Special Photographic and Sound Effects in the Paramount production Spawn of the North." |

== See also ==
- List of Dutch submissions for the Academy Award for Best Foreign Language Film
- Cinema of the Netherlands
- List of Dutch films
