= Netherlands Film Festival =

Annual film festival held in Utrecht, Netherlands

Coordinates: 52°05′N 05°07′E

- Dutch Logo of Netherlands Film Festival
- Location: Utrecht, Netherlands
- Founded: 24 September 1981
- Founded by: Jos Stelling
- Most recent: 2025
- Awards: Golden Calf
- Festival date: September 26, 2025 to October 3, 2025
- Language: Dutch
- Website: NFF

Current: 46th
- 47th 45th

The Netherlands Film Festival (Dutch: Nederlands Film Festival) is an annual film festival, held in September and October of each year in the city of Utrecht.

During the ten-day festival, Dutch film productions and co-productions are exhibited. Besides feature films, the program also consists of short subjects, documentary films, and television productions. On the closing evening of the festival, the Golden Calves are awarded to the best films, directors, and actors.

Together with the Netherlands Film Fund, the festival also recognises box office results of Dutch film productions during the year with the Crystal Film (10,000 visitors of documentary films), Golden Film (100,000 visitors), Platinum Film (400,000 visitors), and Diamond Film (1,000,000 visitors).

== History ==
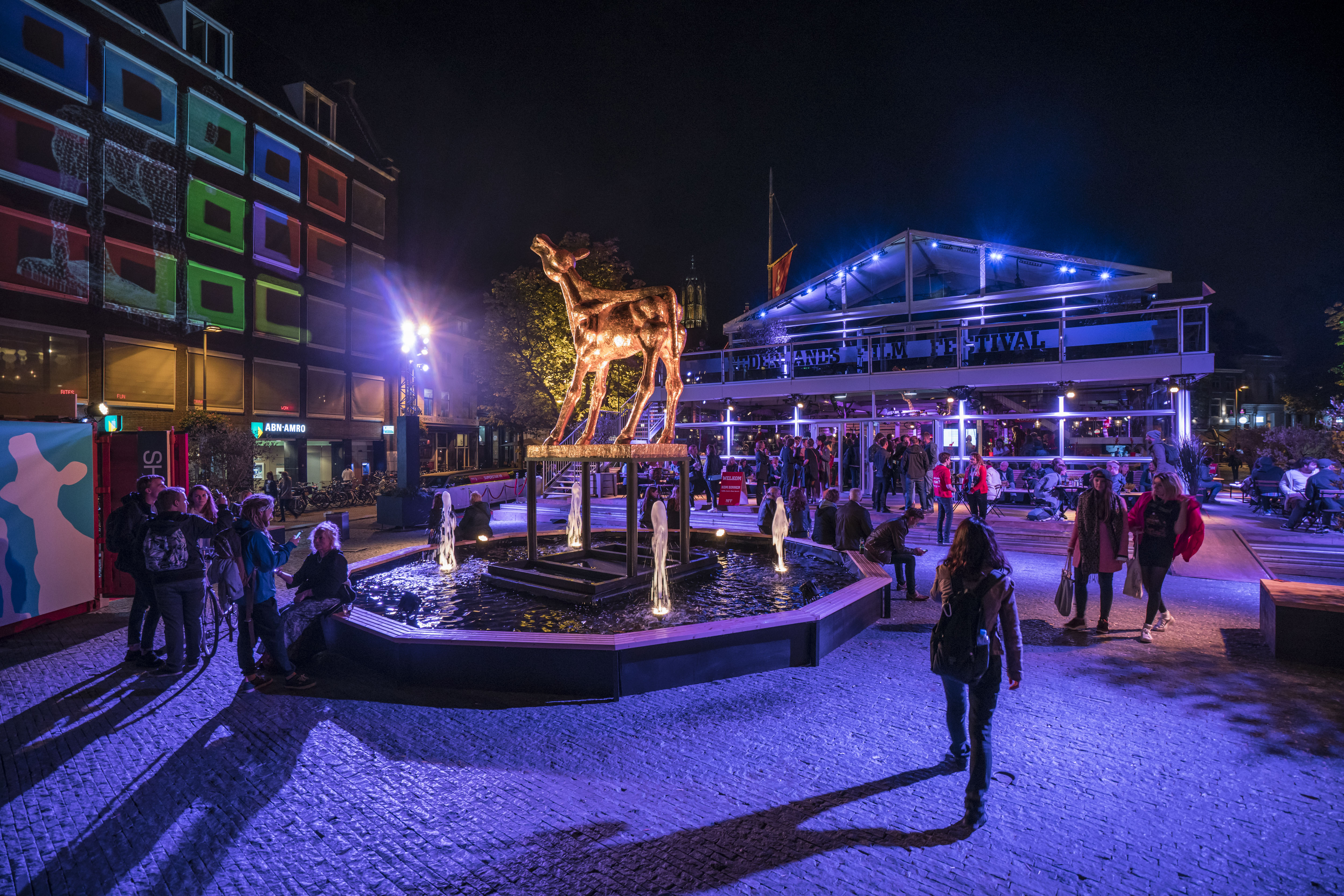
Netherlands Film Festival in 2018

The Netherlands Film Festival was founded in 1981 by the Dutch film maker Jos Stelling, who called it the "Netherlands Film Days" (Nederlandse Filmdagen). Initially, the festival was oriented towards film makers only, but it gradually reached a broader audience.

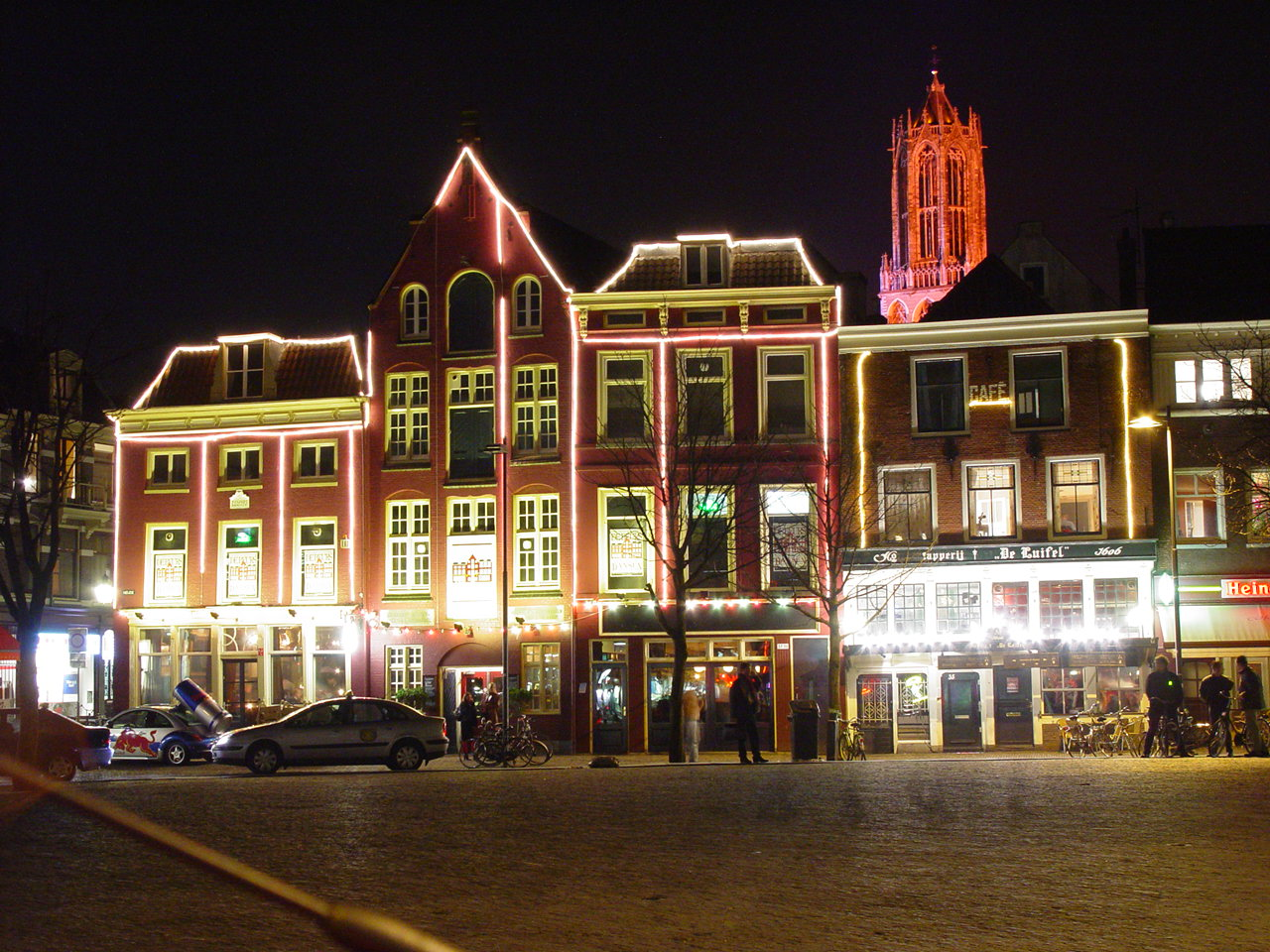
Neude at night

The 36th edition of the festival, in 2016, attracted more than 150,000 visitors.

== Canon of Dutch cinema ==
In 2007, the festival presented their Canon of Dutch Cinema, (Canon van de Nederlandse Film), containing sixteen monumental films in Dutch film history. The list included the following films:

- The Misadventure of a French Gentleman Without Pants at the Zandvoort Beach (Willy Mullens and Alberts Frères, 1905)
- A Carmen of the North (Maurits Binger, 1919)
- Rain (Joris Ivens, 1929)
- The Tars (Jaap Speyer, 1934)
- Houen zo! (Herman van der Horst, 1952)
- Fanfare (Bert Haanstra, 1958)
- Like Two Drops of Water (Fons Rademakers, 1963)
- Blind Kind (Johan van der Keuken, 1964)
- Ik kom wat later naar Madra (Adriaan Ditvoorst, 1965)
- Living (Frans Zwartjes, 1971)
- Turkish Delight (Paul Verhoeven, 1973)
- Flodder (Dick Maas, 1986)
- The Northerners (Alex van Warmerdam, 1992)
- The Pocket-knife (Ben Sombogaart, 1992)
- Het is een schone dag geweest (Jos de Putter, 1993)
- Father and Daughter (Michaël Dudok de Wit, 2000)

== Special guests ==
Since 1992, the festival organisation invites a special guest, usually a respected director or actor in the Dutch film business.

- 1992: Paul Schrader
- 1993: Krzysztof Zanussi
- 1994: Rutger Hauer
- 1995: Nouchka van Brakel
- 1996: Jan de Hartog
- 1997: Monique van de Ven
- 1998: First Floor Features
- 1999: ?
- 2000: Heddy Honigmann
- 2001: Renée Soutendijk
- 2002: Pieter Verhoeff
- 2003: Jan Decleir
- 2004: Jean van de Velde
- 2005: Jos Stelling
- 2006: Johanna ter Steege
- 2007: Burny Bos
- 2008: Monic Hendrickx
- 2009: Jack Wouterse
- 2010: Anneke Blok
- 2011: Frans van Gestel
- 2012: Jeroen Willems
- 2013: Paula van der Oest
- 2014: Fons Merkies
- 2016: Willem de Beukelaer

== Awards ==
Besides the Golden Calves the Festival also has its own special awards.

- Dutch Film Critics award
- Award of the city Utrecht
- Tuschinski Award (former Cannon City Prize)
- Talent & Pro Student Award
- NPS Award for best short film
- Teen Award
- Cinema.nl Film Poster Award (former Skrien Afficheprijs)
- Grolsch Film Award

== Opening films ==
- 1981 The Girl with the Red Hair
- 1982 De smaak van water
- 1983 Giovanni
- 1984 De grens
- 1985 Pervola, sporen in de sneeuw
- 1986 The Pointsman
- 1987 A Month Later
- 1988 Shadow Man
- 1989 Blueberry Hill
- 1990 Vigour
- 1991 The Province
- 1992 The Three Best Things in Life
- 1993 Unknown Time
- 1994 1000 Roses
- 1995 Antonia's Line
- 1996 De nieuwe moeder
- 1997 Tropic of Emerald
- 1998 Het 14e kippetje
- 1999 Under the Palms
- 2000 Wild Mussels
- 2001 De grot
- 2002 Ramses
- 2003 Phileine Says Sorry
- 2004 Simon
- 2005 Life!
- 2006 Waiter
- 2007 Duska
- 2008 In Real Life
- 2009 Tramontana
- 2010 Tirza
- 2011 The Gang of Oss
- 2012 The Zigzag Kid
- 2013 The Price of Sugar
- 2014 Reckless
- 2015 J. Kessels
- 2016 De Held
- 2017 Tulipani, Love, Honour and a Bicycle
- 2018 Open Seas
- 2019 Instinct
- 2020 Buladó
- 2021 My Father Is an Airplane
- 2023 Sweet Dreams

== See also ==
- Cinema of the Netherlands
- Documentary film of the Netherlands
