= Buddha's Lost Children =

- Theatrical release poster
- Directed by: Mark Verkerk
- Written by: Mark Verkerk
- Produced by: Ton Okkerse; Pim van Collem
- Cinematography: René Heijnen; Sarit Charoenyuenyaw
- Edited by: Jos Driessen; Helen Delachaux
- Music by: Somtow Sucharitkul; Bernhard Joosten; Ward Henselmans
- Distributed by: Independent Films
- Release date: 7 September 2006
- Running time: 97 minutes
- Country: Netherlands
- Language: Thai

Buddha's Lost Children is a 2006 documentary film by Dutch director Mark Verkerk. The feature film tells the story of Khru Bah Neua Chai Kositto, a Buddhist monk who has dedicated his life to orphaned children in the Golden Triangle area of Thailand. The film opened in Dutch cinemas in September 2006.

== Awards ==
The film won the International Documentary Grand Jury Prize (2006) at the Los Angeles AFI Fest, the Jury Award for Documentary (2007) at the Newport Beach Film Festival, the Best Global Insight Film (2007) at the Jackson Hole Film Festival , the David L. Wolper Best Documentary Award (2007) at the Napa Sonoma Valley Film Festival , the City of Rome Award (2006) at the Asiaticafilmmediale in Rome, the Crystal Film (2006) at the Netherlands Film Festival, and the Silver Dove (2006) at the Dok Leipzig.
