= Brusse =

Brusse is a surname. Notable people with the surname include:

- Franklin Andrej Brusse (born 1951), South African botanist and lichenologist
- Jan Brusse (1921–1996), Dutch journalist
- Kees Brusse (1925–2013), Dutch actor, film director, and screenwriter
