= Panta Rhei (film) =

1952 film by Bert Haanstra

- Directed by: Bert Haanstra
- Written by: Bert Haanstra
- Produced by: Piet van Moock
- Cinematography: Bert Haanstra
- Edited by: Bert Haanstra
- Music by: Max Vredenburg
- Production company: Forum Film
- Release date: 8 March 1952 (Amsterdam)
- Running time: 11 minutes
- Country: Netherlands

Panta Rhei is a Dutch short documentary film by Bert Haanstra, first shown in 1952. It portrays the motions of nature, edited rhythmically with alternating footage of water, clouds and vegetation, sometimes using time-lapse photography. It was Haanstra's fourth film as director and like many of his early films it does not feature any humans. The title is a Greek phrase (ta panta rhei) associated with the philosopher Heraclitus and the concept that everything is in a constant state of becoming something else. The film competed at the 1952 Cannes Film Festival. Critics have highlighted its rhythmicality and vision of nature.

== Synopsis ==
The black and white, eleven minutes long film is a poetic and partially abstract portrayal of motion in nature. The sun rises and shines through a forest grove, creating moving shadows and reflections in pools of water. Footage of flowing water and fast-moving clouds dissolve into each other. Floating foam and glittering water surfaces interplay with time-lapse footage of clouds and opening flowers. Shallow waves on a beach alternate with crystals. Fast clouds alternate with winds blowing through vegetation and waves in slow motion. There is a single lightning strike. Clouds move over land and a town, partially blocking the sunlight. Swirling leaves fall to the ground and alternate with a large swarm of birds that fills the sky and moves in wavy patterns. As the sun sets, shadows from trees move across the ground, a low wave hits a beach and clouds move rapidly in the sky. It is dark for a moment before the sun rises again and a sunflower opens.

== Production ==
Panta Rhei was the fourth film Bert Haanstra directed and it was made right after his film Mirror of Holland had won the Short Film Grand Prix at the 1951 Cannes Film Festival. Like several of Haanstra's early films, it is based on rhythms, patterns and associations. Haanstra later explained this by saying he was not yet ready to cope with humans. Haanstra was the writer, director, cinematographer and editor of Panta Rhei. Piet van Moock was producer and the production company was Forum Film. Haanstra and Van Mock nearly fell out at the start of production when Haanstra found out the latter had discussed the film at the Ministry of Education, Arts and Sciences without bringing him along.

The title is the Greek phrase panta rhei which means "everything flows". It comes from Plato's dialogue Cratylus where it is associated with the philosopher Heraclitus. Haanstra did not study Heraclitus' philosophy but was fascinated by the concept that everything continuously becomes something else. He thought cinema suited this concept by being able to capture natural movements at unusual speeds, allowing the filmmaker to compose movements into a flowing rhythm. Haanstra made a distinction between movement and film movement, inspired by the filmmaker collective De Nederlandsche Filmliga that had been active in the Netherlands two decades earlier. Panta Rhei had the working title Vier dansen (lit. 'Four dances'), which referred to its movements and its originally conceived four themes: nature, animals, city and labour. The city and labour themes were eventually removed entirely and the animal theme reduced to a swarm of birds.

The soundtrack consists of a modernist chamber music score by Max Vredenburg. The music involves a harp arpeggio when water reflects the sun, a solo flute and bassoon lines accompanying natural sounds, an oboe motif to footage of opening flowers and a harpsichord ostinato during close-ups of streaming water.

== Reception ==
Panta Rhei premiered on 8 March 1952 during the opening event of the Netherlands Film Museum in Amsterdam. It was shown in the short film competition programme of the 1952 Cannes Film Festival.

The media historian Erik Barnouw stressed how Panta Rhei consists of elements of nature that rhythmically dissolve into each other, which he said reveals "a surpriseing identity" between them. According to Barnouw, the film shows how Haanstra from the start of his career assumed the role of "the perspective observer, coaxing the viewer into sharing his vision". The film historian Peter Cowie writes that despite its title, Panta Rhei does not have any of the gloom associated with Heraclitus, but engages in "extolling nature" and "showing the sensuous undercurrent of life itself". Hans Schoots writes in his doctoral dissertation that Panta Rhei is similar to Mirror of Holland in its form, motifs and alternating tempo, and it features the same effect of sunlight through a forest as Haanstra's first short film, The Muider Group Revived (1948). Schoots says the editing and frequent use of "image rhyme" in Panta Rhei suggest that the different elements of nature form one whole, which is in constant motion and framed in the film by the "primeval fire" of the rising and setting sun. In an essay about the film, the media studies scholar Anke Steinborn writes that it on its basic level reproduces nature's rhythms. She discusses its aesthetics in relation to how Martin Heidegger interpreted the philosophy of Heraclitus, and the film's place in the history of rhythmic cinema, comparing it to the silent film Berlin: Symphony of a Metropolis (1927) and other films from the Weimar Republic. The musicologist Emile Wennekes says Vredenburg's music score strengthens the visual impressions, creating an "unpretentious and organic unity" of images and sound.
