= Kees Brusse =

Dutch actor and director (1925–2013)

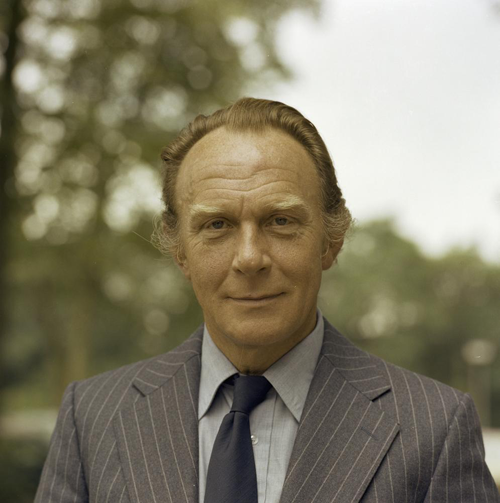
- Brusse in 1978
- Born: 26 February 1925; Rotterdam, Netherlands
- Died: 9 December 2013 (aged 88); Laren, Netherlands
- Occupations: Actor; Film director
- Years active: 1936–2004

Kees Brusse (Dutch pronunciation: [ˈkeːz ˈbrʏsə]; 26 February 1925 – 9 December 2013) was a Dutch actor, film director and screenwriter. A self-taught actor, he was remarkable for his natural acting style at a time when more theatrical performances were the norm in The Netherlands. One of the first Dutch actors who managed to combine a stage and film career with a career on TV, radio and in commercials, he appeared in 47 films and television shows between 1936 and 2004, including Pension Hommeles (1957–1959), Ciske de Rat (1955), and Dokter Pulder zaait papavers (1975).

== Early life ==
Kees Brusse was born in Rotterdam, the son of author and journalist M.J. Brusse and opera singer Antje Ebes. His parents divorced when he was young. Brusse started acting at a young age. At the age of 11 he made his film debut in Merijntje Gijzens Jeugd.

== Career ==
At the age of 15 he ran away from home to pursue an acting career. Rejected from drama school he became volunteer at the theater company of Cor van der Lugt Melsert at the Stadsschouwburg. He made his stage debut in 1941 as Pietje Puck in Boefje, a play written by his father.

After the end of World War II Brusse performed at the cabaret of Wim Sonneveld, toured Switzerland, and in 1948, visited Indonesia with his theater group Toneelgroep C 6. In the following years he became a much sought and celebrated actor. As a self-taught actor his acting style was different from his contemporaries: more natural and dosed in a time when Dutch acting was characterized by large gestures and theatrical delivery. He was involved with several theater companies, including Toneelgroep Theater, De Haagse Comedie, Het Amsterdams Toneel and the Nederlandse Comedie. From 1952 to 1954 he was artistic leader of the Rotterdamse Comedie, where he worked with his later wife Mieke Verstraete.

In 1950, he played the leading part in the film De dijk is dicht, directed by Anton Koolhaas. He had leading roles in four of the only eleven Dutch feature films released in the 1950s, including Ciske de Rat (1955), still considered one of the best visited films of The Netherlands.

Brusse was able to combine his stage and film career with work for radio, TV and commercials, one of the first Dutch actors to do so. He became well known to the Dutch public with the radio play De familie Doorsnee (1952–1958) and Pension Hommeles (1957–1959), the first true Dutch TV series, both written by Annie M.G. Schmidt. In 1964 and 1965 he played the title character in the Dutch TV version of Maigret. In both Pension Hommeles as Maigret, the role of his wife was played by Brusse's then wife Mieke Verstraete.

In 1962, he directed his first film, Kermis in de regen. The same year, he directed the actors in Paul Rotha's film The Silent Raid. His documentary Mensen van morgen (1964) sketches a portrait of young people in the early sixties and is praised for its candor. Two years later, he made a German version, Menschen von Morgen.

In the 1970s he has the leading parts in several films by Wim Verstappen and Pim de la Parra: Blue Movie (1971), VD (1972) and Dakota (1974). He also starred in Bert Haanstra's 1975 film Dokter Pulder zaait papavers, which was entered into the 26th Berlin International Film Festival. Around the same time, he also was a regular panel member in the game show Wie van de drie, the Dutch version of To Tell the Truth. Furthermore, he performed in commercials for Shell and Zwitserleven, the Dutch branch of insurance company Swiss Life.

Between 1981 and 1985, he performed in Mensen zoals jij en ik (based on the German TV series Leute wie du und ich), a series of short stories written by Herbert Reinecker. In each episode, Brusse played a different character, including a taxi driver, a clown, a seducer and a business man.

In 2002, he released under his own management Vader is zo stil de laatste tijd, a personal documentary about aging. In 2004, he was one of the leading actors in the TV drama series De Erfenis.

== Personal life ==
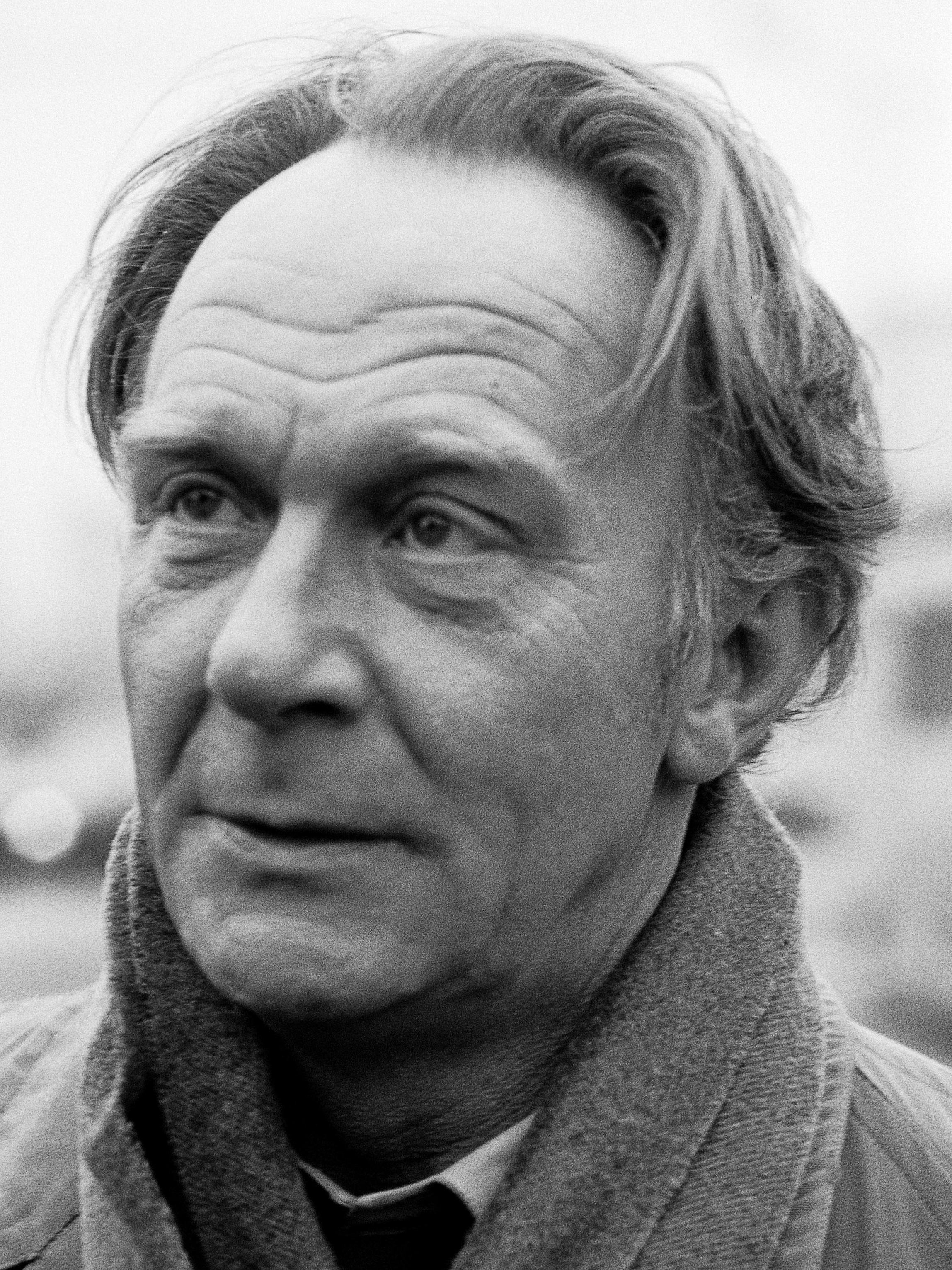
Kees Brusse in 1979

Kees Brusse was married five times and had two children. From 1948 to 1953, he was married to Wim Kan's assistant Pam Henning. In 1954, he married actress Mieke Verstraete, with whom he had a daughter. In 1975, he married Marlou Peters. They got a daughter as well.

In 1986, he married Sonja Boerrigter. With her Brusse left The Netherlands in 1988. They went to live in Bonaire, France and Australia. Boerrigter died in 2000. He spent his final years in Perth with his fifth wife, Joan St. Clair. In 2008, he returned briefly to The Netherlands for the release of his autobiography, co-written by Henk van der Horst. He suffered from emphysema and was officially declared blind.

In January 2013, he returned to The Netherlands to live in the Rosa Spier Huis, a retirement home for notable Dutch artists. He died on 9 December 2013 at the age of 88.

== Awards and recognition ==
For Mensen zoals jij en ik, he won the 1982 Gouden Televizier-Ring, the most important Dutch audience award for TV programmes. In 1987, he was invested as a Knight of the Order of Orange-Nassau.

== Selected filmography ==
- Merijntje Gijzens Jeugd (1936)
- De Dijk is Dicht (1950)
- Ciske de Rat (1955)
- Kleren Maken de Man (1957)
- Jenny (1958)
- Blue Movie (1971)
- Dakota (1974)
- Dokter Pulder zaait papavers (1975)
- Rooie Sien (1975)
- The Right to Know (1996)
- Man, Vrouw, Hondje (1999)
