= Nina Foch =

Dutch-born American actress (1924–2008)

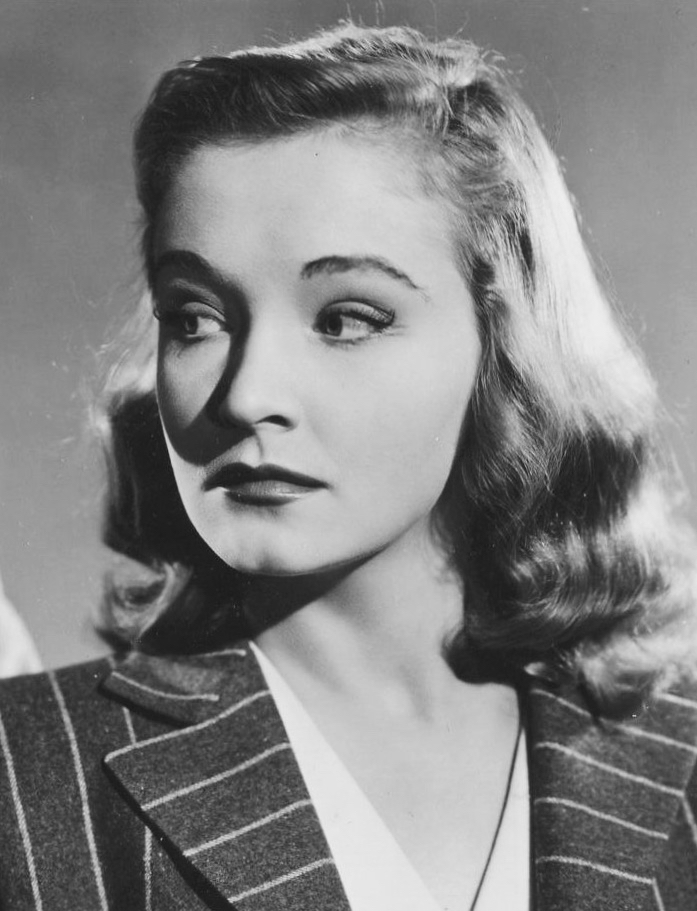
- Foch in Escape in the Fog (1945)
- Born: Nina Consuelo Maud Fock; April 20, 1924; Leiden, South Holland, Netherlands
- Died: December 5, 2008 (aged 84); Los Angeles, California, U.S.
- Occupations: Actress, drama teacher
- Years active: 1943–2007
- Spouses: James Lipton (m. 1954; div. 1959) Dennis de Brito (m. 1959; div. 1964) Michael Dewell (m. 1967; div. 1993)
- Children: 1
- Mother: Consuelo Flowerton

Nina Foch (/fɒʃ/ FOSH; born Nina Consuelo Maud Fock; April 20, 1924 – December 5, 2008) was an American actress who later became a drama instructor. Her career spanned 6 decades, consisting of over 50 feature films and over 100 television credits. She was the recipient of numerous accolades, including an Academy Award nomination for Best Supporting Actress, and a National Board of Review Award for Best Supporting Actress. Foch established herself as a dramatic actress in the late 1940s, often playing cool, aloof sophisticates.

== Life and career ==
=== 1924–1942: Early years ===
Nina Foch was born Nina Consuelo Maud Fock in 1924 in Leiden, South Holland, Netherlands, to Dutch classical music conductor Dirk Foch and American actress and singer Consuelo Flowerton. Her parents divorced when she was a toddler, and she and her mother moved to the United States, settling in New York City.

Throughout Foch's childhood, her mother encouraged her artistic talents; she learned piano and enjoyed art but was more interested in acting. After graduating from the Lincoln School, Foch attended the American Academy of Dramatic Arts, studying method acting under Lee Strasberg and Stella Adler.

=== 1943–1950: Early films and theater ===
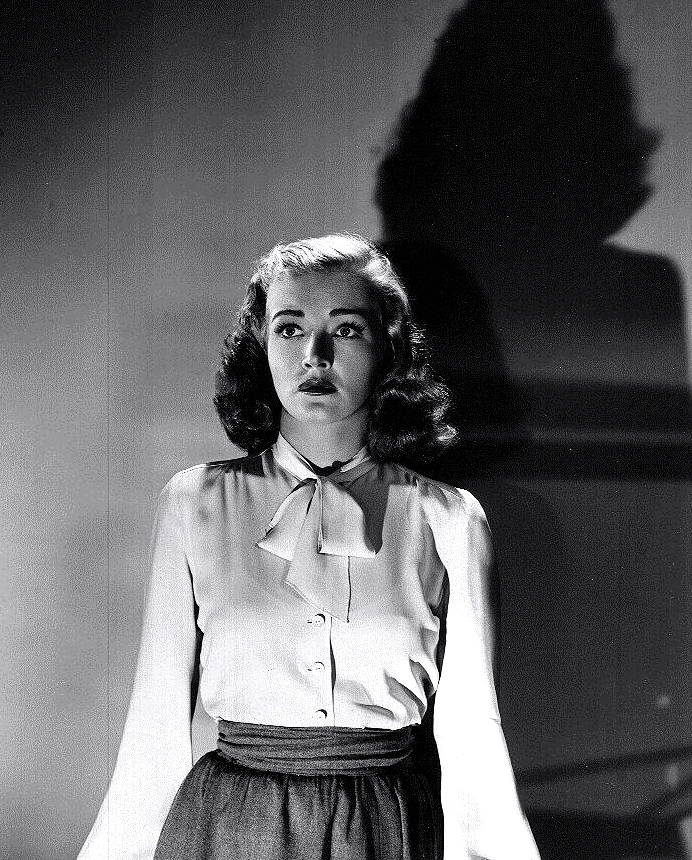
Foch as Harriet Hosbon in Johnny O'Clock (1947)

After signing a contract with Columbia Pictures at age 19, Foch made her feature film debut in the studio's horror picture The Return of the Vampire (1943) with Bela Lugosi, subsequently appearing in Columbia's Cry of the Werewolf the next year. This was followed with a role in the biopic A Song to Remember (1945), the drama I Love a Mystery (1945); and a string of film noirs, including Escape in the Fog (1945), in which she starred as a woman who has a premonition of her kidnapping. The same year, she had the titular role in My Name is Julia Ross, a mystery about a woman who, after taking a new job working as a secretary for a family in London, awakens one morning to find herself with a different identity in a remote seaside house in rural Cornwall.

Next, Foch appeared in Johnny O'Clock (1947), The Dark Past (1948), The Undercover Man (1948), and Johnny Allegro (1949). During this time, she was also a regular in John Houseman's CBS Playhouse 90 television series.

Foch made her Broadway debut in the 1947 production of John Loves Mary, playing the titular Mary. She subsequently starred in Stratford and Broadway productions of Shakespeare's Twelfth Night (1949) and King Lear (1950).

=== 1951–1980: Critical recognition ===
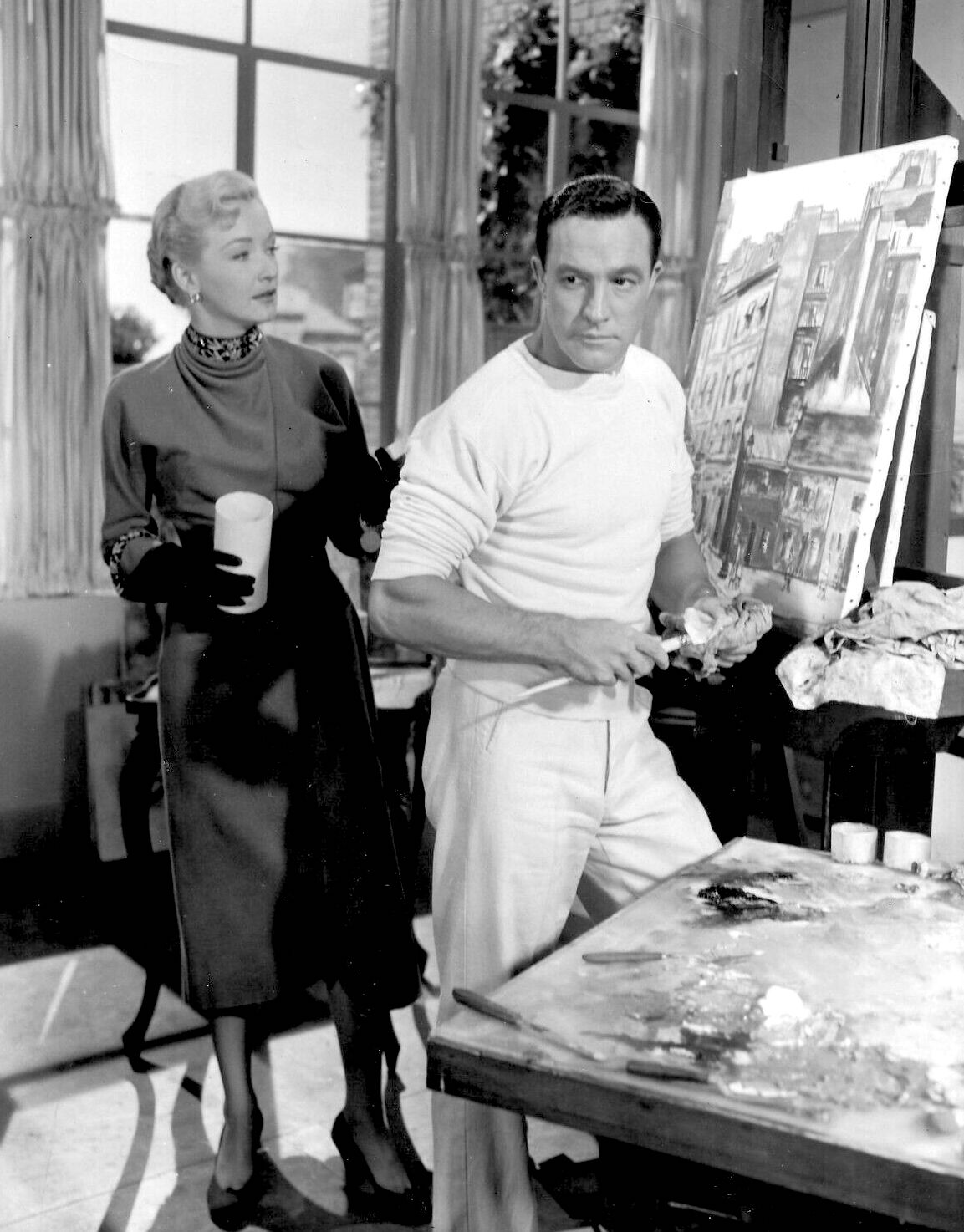
Foch with Gene Kelly in An American in Paris (1951)

In 1951, Foch appeared with Gene Kelly in the musical An American in Paris, which was awarded the Best Picture Oscar that year. Foch also appeared in Scaramouche (1952) as Marie Antoinette. She returned to theater in 1955, appearing in an Off-Broadway production of Measure for Measure, followed by The Taming of the Shrew. Next, Foch starred in Cecil B. DeMille's The Ten Commandments (1956) as Bithiah, the pharaoh's daughter, who finds the infant Moses in the bulrushes, adopts him as her son, and joins him and the Hebrews in their exodus from Egypt. In 1957, Foch was honored by the Maryland State Council of the American Jewish Congress with a special award for her performance in The Ten Commandments.

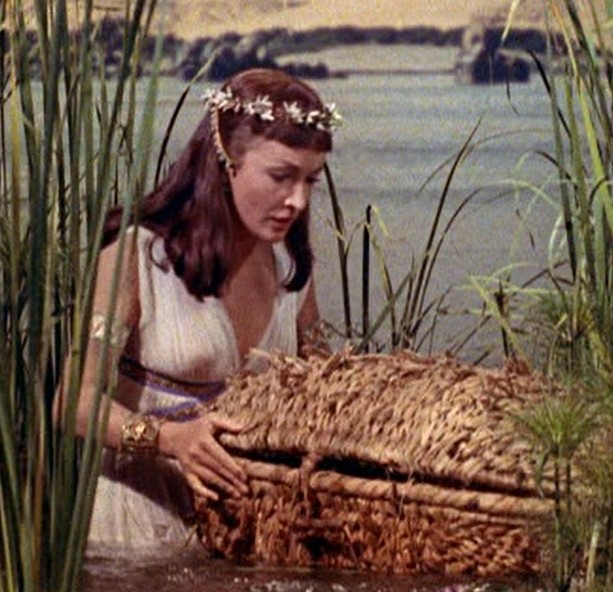
Foch as Bithiah in The Ten Commandments (1956)

Foch received a nomination for the Academy Award for Best Supporting Actress for her role as a secretary in the boardroom drama Executive Suite (1954), starring William Holden, Fredric March, and Barbara Stanwyck. The same year Executive Suite was released, Foch married her first husband, actor James Lipton; their marriage spanned five years before ending in divorce in 1959. The same year, she married television writer Dennis de Brito, with whom she gave birth to one son, Dirk.

In Spartacus (1960), starring Kirk Douglas and Laurence Olivier, she played a woman who chooses gladiators to fight to the death in the ring simply for her entertainment. In 1961, she guest-starred in the NBC series about the family divisions from American Civil War entitled The Americans. In 1963, she appeared on the NBC game show Your First Impression. In 1964, she played the title role in the episode "Maggie, Queen of the Jungle" of Craig Stevens's short-lived CBS drama series, Mr. Broadway. Also in 1964, Foch divorced her second husband, De Brito. Foch was next cast as Eva Frazier in the Outer Limits episode "The Borderland". She appeared in an episode of Gunsmoke as the widowed matriarch of a lawless town, and played in an episode on Combat! titled episode "The Casket". In 1967, she made her theatrical directorial debut with a Broadway production of Ways and Means, a comedy by Noël Coward. Foch married her third husband, Michael Dewell, in 1967.

Foch also worked extensively in television beginning in the 1950s, guest-starring in Checkmate (1961), Naked City (1962), Route 66 (1964), The Wild Wild West (1969), The F.B.I. (1970), and Hawaii Five-O (1973).

She was subsequently cast as the first murder victim of the Columbo mystery series starring Peter Falk, appearing in the pilot movie, Prescription: Murder (1968), with Gene Barry as her husband, a homicidal psychiatrist. In the early 1970s, she guest-starred on ABC's That Girl in the fifth-season episode, That Script, and NBC's The Brian Keith Show. In 1975, she appeared in the film Mahogany, starring Diana Ross, and subsequently supporting roles in the horror film Jennifer and the Walt Disney supernatural television film Child of Glass (both released in 1978). In 1980, Foch was nominated for a Primetime Emmy Award for Outstanding Supporting Actress for her guest role as Mrs. Pope on the Lou Grant episode "Hollywood".

Also beginning in the 1960s, Foch began working as an instructor, teaching "Directing the Actor" classes at the School of Cinematic Arts at the University of Southern California (USC), as well as at the American Film Institute.

=== 1981–2008: Later work and teaching ===
Later in her career, Foch appeared in War and Remembrance (1988) as the Comtesse de Chambrun, an American collaborationist in WWII Paris who employs Jane Seymour's character, Natalie Henry, as a librarian and suggests that the best place for her and her uncle would be the inaptly named "Paradise Ghetto". She also appeared as Frannie Halcyon in the TV miniseries Tales of the City (1993). The same year, Foch divorced her third husband, Michael Dewell. Another notable television role was as the Overseer Commander (or "Kleezantzun") in the first of the Alien Nation TV movies, Alien Nation: Dark Horizon (1994).

In her final years, Foch appeared on the television series Just Shoot Me, Bull, Dharma & Greg, and NCIS, the latter portraying Dr. Donald "Ducky" Mallard's elderly mother. She also had minor roles in the independent drama film Pumpkin (2002), and the romantic comedy film How to Deal (2003).

Beginning in the 1960s, Foch began a concurrent career as an educator, teaching courses in drama and film directing at the American Film Institute and at the University of Southern California's School of Cinematic Arts, where she was a faculty member for over 40 years. Among her students were directors Randal Kleiser and Edward Zwick and performer Julie Andrews. Foch continued to teach until the end of her life, up until her death in December 2008 of myelodysplastic syndrome.

Foch also worked as an independent script-breakdown consultant for many Hollywood directors.

=== Death ===
Foch died on December 5, 2008, aged 84, at the Ronald Reagan UCLA Medical Center. Her only son, Dirk de Brito, told the Los Angeles Times that she died of complications from the blood disorder myelodysplasia. She had become ill the day before, while teaching her course at USC. Foch was cremated by the Neptune Society of Sherman Oaks, California, and her ashes were placed in the custody of her son.

== Legacy ==
Foch has stars on the Hollywood Walk of Fame, located at 6300 Hollywood Boulevard, and 7000 Hollywood Boulevard. Those who studied with her include Rod Stewart, Julie Andrews, John Ritter (with whom she co-starred in Skin Deep), Amy Heckerling, Randal Kleiser, Edward Zwick, Ron Underwood, and Marshall Herskovitz. Andrews recalled of Foch: "She was a tough teacher, but in the best sense. She was always brutally frank, she demanded one go the extra mile, and she wouldn't allow one to get away with a thing." Kleiser, who studied with Foch in 1965, reflected: "She was able to take the things she learned working with directors like Vincente Minnelli and Stanley Kubrick and combine them with her own style."

Foch was reportedly the inspiration for the character Nina, a washed-up actress teaching acting classes from a seedy motel, in Rufus Butler Seder's film Screamplay. Seder had studied under Foch years earlier.

== Acting credits and accolades ==
=== Awards and nominations ===
Institution	Category	Year	Nominated work	Result	Ref.
Academy Awards	Best Supporting Actress	1954	Executive Suite	Nominated	
National Board of Review	Best Supporting Actress	1954	Executive Suite	Won	
Primetime Emmy Awards	Outstanding Supporting Actress in a Drama Series	1980	Lou Grant; Episode: "Hollywood"	Nominated	
Venice Film Festival	Grand Jury Prize	1954	Executive Suite	Won	

== See also ==
- List of Dutch Academy Award winners and nominees — Best Supporting Actress
- List of actors with Academy Award nominations

== Sources ==
- Aaker, Everett (2013). George Raft: The Films. Jefferson, North Carolina: McFarland. ISBN 978-0-7864-6646-7.
- Blottner, Gene (2015). Columbia Noir: A Complete Filmography, 1940–1962. Jefferson, North Carolina: McFarland. ISBN 978-0-7864-7014-3.
- Keenan, Richard C. (2007). The Films of Robert Wise. Lanham, Maryland: Scarecrow Press. ISBN 978-0-8108-6663-8.
- Pitts, Michael R. (2014). Columbia Pictures Horror, Science Fiction and Fantasy Films, 1928–1982. Jefferson, North Carolina: McFarland. ISBN 978-0-7864-5766-3.
- Wilson, Scott (2016). Resting Places: The Burial Sites of More Than 14,000 Famous Persons (3rd ed.). Jefferson, North Carolina: McFarland. ISBN 978-1-4766-2599-7.
