= When the Poppies Bloom Again =

1975 film

Dokter Pulder zaait papavers
- Directed by: Bert Haanstra
- Written by: Anton Koolhaas
- Produced by: Bert Haanstra
- Cinematography: Anton van Munster
- Music by: Otto Ketting
- Distributed by: Bert Haanstra filmproducties
- Release date: 9 October 1975
- Running time: 105 minutes
- Country: Netherlands
- Language: Dutch

When the Poppies Bloom Again (Dutch: Dokter Pulder zaait papavers, lit. 'Doctor Pulder Sows Poppies') is a 1975 Dutch drama film directed by Bert Haanstra. It is based on the book The Nail Behind the Wallpaper by Anton Koolhaas.

The film was entered into the 26th Berlin International Film Festival, but won no prizes. It was also selected as the Dutch entry for the Best Foreign Language Film at the 48th Academy Awards, but was not accepted as a nominee.

== Plot ==
Kees Pulder, a family doctor in a rural village, receives an unexpected visit from an old college friend, the renowned neurosurgeon Hans van Inge Liedaerd. Over dinner and a subsequent drinking session, they reminisce: Van Inge Liedaerd praises Pulder as a quick-witted and popular student, but Pulder remembers none of this. Van Inge Liedaerd stays the night, but the next morning he turns out to have left, taking Pulder’s supply of morphine with him. Hans van Inge Liedaerd, now exposed as a drug addict, dies not long after from an overdose.

Pulder, however, does not blame Van Inge Liedaerd; on the contrary: he realizes that he has been leading a dull, uneventful life for years, and that Hans has opened his eyes. During the funeral, Pulder, who is now completely under Hans’s spell, meets Hans’s mistress, the alcoholic Mrs. Mies, and arranges to meet with her to talk about Hans. After the funeral, Pulder also speaks with Hans’s wife. She, however, seems to have only bad memories of her marriage and does not wish to have any further contact.

After a difficult first visit, Pulder, who now wants to learn as much as possible about Hans, begins to visit Mrs. Mies more and more often. These evenings invariably end in heavy drinking binges, causing Pulder to increasingly neglect his family and his practice. At one point, Mies reveals that she and Hans, after yet another failed attempt at rehab, had decided to commit suicide together; using a potion made from poppy seeds, they would be able to drift peacefully to sleep. Hans, however, died before they could plant the poppy seeds. Pulder then offers to do this together with her, as a tribute to Hans.

That same evening, a drunken Pulder hits a cyclist on his way home and ends up in jail. Immediately after his release, he goes back to Mrs. Mies, but finds her house deserted. He learns from the village grocer that she has died of poisoning. In her garden, among lushly blooming poppies, Pulder finds a note from Mies, in which she advises him to return to his family and to forget about Hans and her; though he does not forget her entirely.

== Cast ==
- Kees Brusse as Dr. Pulder
- Ton Lensink as Hans van Inge Liedaerd
- Dora van der Groen as Mrs. Mies
- Henny Orri as Lieske Pulder
- Karin Loeb as Kitty
- Manon Alving as Mevrouw van Inge Liedaerd
- Peter Römer as Kamiel Pulder
- Sacco van der Made as poelier Pronk
- Michel Fasbender as Receptionist

== See also ==
- List of submissions to the 48th Academy Awards for Best Foreign Language Film
- List of Dutch submissions for the Academy Award for Best Foreign Language Film
