= Merijntje Gijzens Jeugd =

1936 film

- Directed by: Kurt Gerron
- Written by: A.M. De Jong (novel); Heinz Goldberg
- Release date: 17 September 1936
- Running time: 101 minutes
- Country: Netherlands
- Language: Dutch

Merijntje Gijzens Jeugd is a 1936 Dutch drama film directed by Kurt Gerron after the popular novel of the same title by A.M. de Jong.

== Cast ==
- Marcel Krols ... Merijntje Gijzen
- Piet Bron ... Goort Perdams, de Kruik
- Mimi Boesnach ... Janekee
- A.M. De Jong ... Pastoor
- Frida Gonissen ... Nelleke - Blozekriekske
- Bill Benders... Grensjager
- Aaf Bouber ... Janske
- Harry Boda ... Flierefluiter
- Johan Elsensohn
- Joekie Broedelet ... Moeder Gijzen
- Kees Brusse ... Arjaan Gijzen
- Frits Van Dijk ... Walter, de schrijver
- Jeanne Verstraete ... Mevrouw Walter
- Pierre Balledux ... Veldwachter
