= De Dijk is Dicht =

1950 film

- Directed by: Anton Koolhaas
- Written by: Anton Koolhaas
- Release date: 6 October 1950
- Running time: 100 minutes
- Country: Netherlands
- Language: Dutch

De Dijk is Dicht is a 1950 Dutch film directed by Anton Koolhaas.

== Plot ==
The film starts on the island of Walcheren, following the bombardment of the village of Westkapelle in 1944. After the war, reconstruction commences, but the lonely Bert remains mired in depression over his wife, whom he lost during the horrors of the war. Because of his deep grief, he neglects his relationship with the villagers and shows no interest in their problems, failing to lend a hand when it was so desperately needed. But eventually, he pulls himself together and tries to make up for lost time with his fellow villagers.

== Cast ==
- Kees Brusse ... Bert Verbloeme
- Jan Teulings
- Henny Alma ... Els
- Kitty Knappert ... Marietje
- Jules Verstraete ... Simon
- Cor Hermus
- Mieke Flink
- Piet Bron
- Anton Burgdorffer
- Mia Horna
- Coba Kelling
- Fons Peters
- Anneke Rekker
- Henk van Buuren
- Jan van der Linden
- Mieke Verstraete
- Antoinette de Visser
