= Sterren Stralen Overal =

1953 film by Gerard Rutten

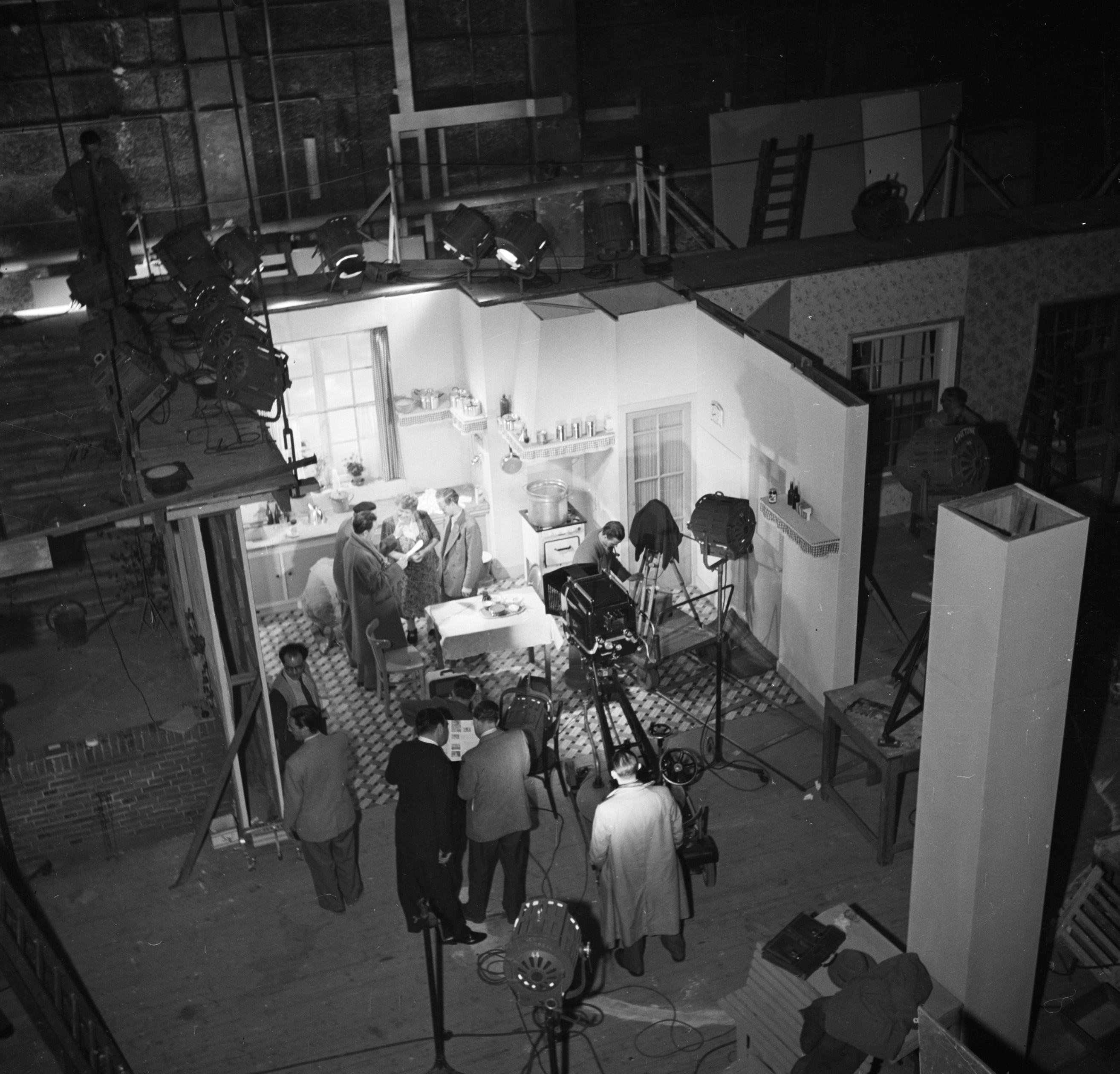
- Atelier Cinetone-Omo during the production of Sterren Stralen Overal
- Directed by: Gerard Rutten
- Written by: Gerard Rutten, Jan Gerhard Toonder
- Release date: 30 January 1953
- Running time: 110 minutes
- Country: Netherlands
- Language: Dutch
- Box office: 1.1 million admissions (Netherlands)

Sterren Stralen Overal is a 1953 Dutch film directed by Gerard Rutten. It stars the Dutch comedy duo Snip en Snap. With over one million admissions it is one of the most successful Dutch films of all time.

== Cast ==
- Piet Muyselaar as Snap
- Willy Walden as Snip
- Kitty Janssen as daughter of Van Amstel
- Johan Kaart as taxi driver Piet van Amstel
- Guus Oster as daughter's friend
- Edwin Rutten
- Peronne Hosang
- Hetty Blok
- Herbert Joeks
