= Diamond Film =

Dutch film box office achievement

- Awarded for: Box office achievements
- Country: Netherlands
- Presented by: Netherlands Film Festival; Netherlands Film Fund
- First award: 31 January 2007

The Diamond Film (Dutch: Diamanten Film) is a film award recognising domestic box office achievements in the Netherlands. The Diamond Film is awarded to films from the Netherlands once they have sold 1,000,000 cinema tickets or more during the original circulation. The award is initiated by the Netherlands Film Festival and the Netherlands Film Fund in addition to the Golden Film for 100,000 visitors, the Platinum Film for 400,000 visitors, and the Crystal Film for 10,000 visitors of a documentary film.

== History ==
The first Diamond Film was awarded to Black Book (2006) on 31 January 2007. The director of the Netherlands Film Festival presented the trophies to the producer San Fu Maltha, director Paul Verhoeven, and the film cast, during a dinner for the film crew and cast organized by San Fu Maltha. Black Book was the first film since the introduction of Dutch box office awards in 2001 that reached an audience of one million visitors. Black Book had a budget of €17,000,000, which made it the most expensive film from the Netherlands ever, at the time of its release. After receiving the Diamond Film, Paul Verhoeven says about Black Book:

It is what we hoped for. We've spent a lot of money, and it has been an expensive film. And we all knew that San Fu Maltha would get into trouble, if we would have had only half a million visitors instead of one million. (...) So actually, it is an enormous success.

Scenario writer Gerard Soeteman says about Black Book after it received the Diamond Film:

For the sake of films from the Netherlands, one hopes that many people would visit it. It is not just for yourself, but it means that people grow more confident in films from the Netherlands. So the public thinks: 'it can't be as bad as it normally is, let's go to a Dutch film again.' So the success of one film is actually stimulating for the generation of audience in general.

== Films that received the Diamond Film ==
Diamond Film for 1,000,000 tickets sold
Year	Film title	Film release	Diamond Film
2007	Black Book	14 September 2006	31 January 2007
2007	Love is All	11 October 2007	7 December 2007
2010	Stricken	26 November 2009	12 January 2010
2011	New Kids Turbo	9 December 2010	25 January 2011
2011	Gooische Vrouwen	10 March 2011	1 April 2011
2014	Gooische Vrouwen 2	4 December 2014	28 December 2014

== Other Dutch films with more than one million admissions ==
Between 1945 and 2013, the following Dutch films had admissions of greater than one million. In 2014, Gooische Vrouwen 2 had more than 2 million admissions.

Rank	Title	Year	Admissions
1	Turkish Delight	1973	3,338,000
2	Fanfare	1958	2,635,178
3	Ciske the Rat	1955	2,432,500
4	Business Is Business	1971	2,358,946
5	Blue Movie	1971	2,334,896
6	Flodder	1986	2,313,701
7	Gooische Vrouwen	2011	1,914,000
8	Keetje Tippel	1975	1,829,068
9	The Human Dutch	1963	1,663,743
10	Ciske de Rat	1984	1,593,741
11	Soldier of Orange	1977	1,546,498
12	Flodders in America	1992	1,494,000
13	The Silent Raid	1962	1,474,286
14	Love Is All	2007	1,318,000
15	A Kingdom for a House	1949	1,291,728
16	Stricken	2009	1,211,000
17	Little Crumb	1999	1,136,000
18	Stars Shine Everywhere	1953	1,129,931
19	Spetters	1980	1,124,162
20	New Kids Turbo	2010	1,088,000
21	Help! The Doctor Is Drowning	1974	1,088,441
22	Black Book	2006	1,056,000
23	Army Brats	1984	1,048,768
24	Loony Joe	1981	1,046,784
