= Anton Koolhaas =

Dutch journalist, novelist and scenario writer

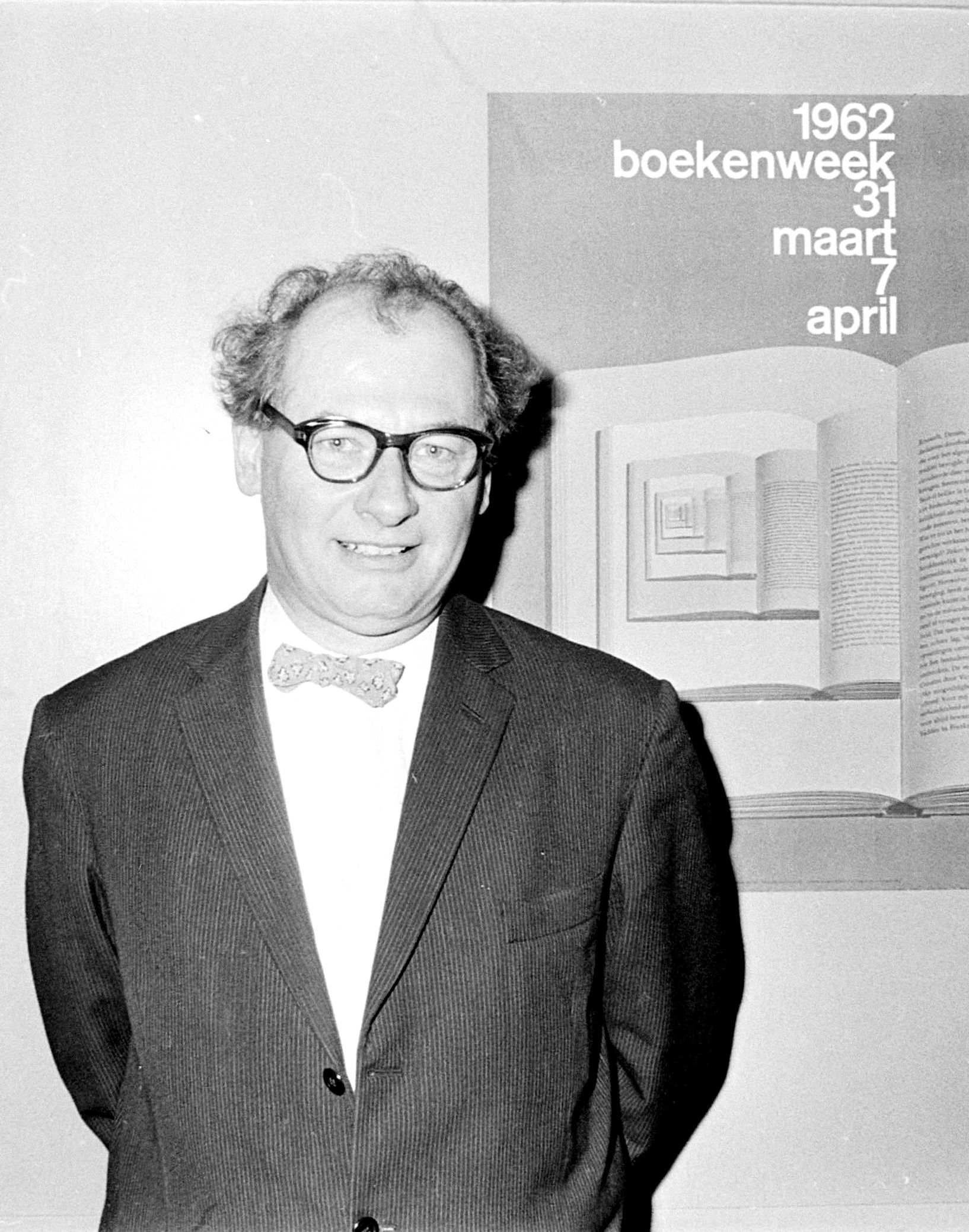
- Anton Koolhaas, 1962
- Born: Anthonie Koolhaas; 16 November 1912; Utrecht, Netherlands
- Died: 16 December 1992 (aged 80); Amsterdam, Netherlands
- Education: Utrecht University
- Occupations: Journalist, novelist, scenario writer
- Spouse: Selinde Pietertje Roosenburg
- Children: Rem Koolhaas (1944)
- Writing career
- Notable awards: P. C. Hooft Award (1992)

Anthonie "Anton" Koolhaas (16 November 1912 – 16 December 1992) was a Dutch journalist, novelist, and scenario writer.

== Biography ==
Anthonie Koolhaas was born on 16 November 1912 in Utrecht, Netherlands. He was the son of Teunis Koolhaas and Trijntje de Boer, and he had two elder brothers and an elder sister. He grew up in Utrecht, where the Remonstrant family lived. He had little connection with the members of his family and he developed a rich imagination. He wrote his first play at the age of seven.

He attended the hogere burgerschool in Utrecht. Between 1931 and 1935 he attended Utrecht University, studying an individual program related to journalism.

He wrote the scenario of the Academy Award-nominated films Everyman (1963) and Ape and Super-Ape (1972), both directed by Bert Haanstra.

He is the father of architect Rem Koolhaas (1944).

He won the Constantijn Huygens Prize for his complete works in 1989 and the P. C. Hooft Award, a literary oeuvre award, in 1992.

He died on 16 December 1992, age 80, in Amsterdam, Netherlands.

== Bibliography ==
- De deur (1933)
- Stiemer en Stalma (1939)
- Poging tot instinct (1956)
- Vergeet niet de leeuwen te aaien (1957)
- Er zit geen spek in de val (1958)
- Gekke Witte (1959)
- Een gat in het plafond (1960)
- Weg met de vlinders (1961)
- Een schot in de lucht (1962, "Boekenweekgeschenk")
- Een pak slaag (1963)
- De hond in het lege huis (1964)
- Een geur van heiligheid (1964)
- Niet doen, Sneeuwwitje (1966)
- Vleugels voor een rat (1967)

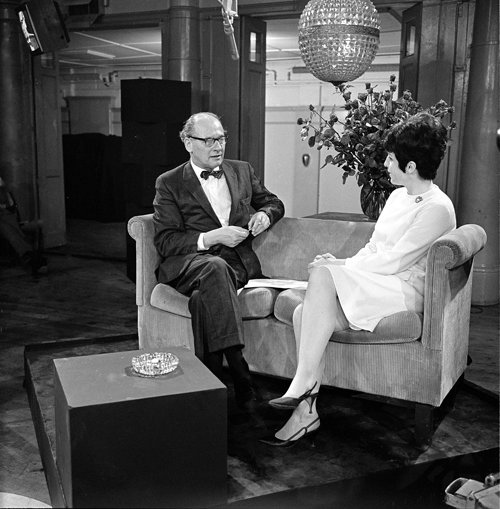
Anton Koolhaas and Mies Bouwman in 1968

- Andermans huid (1968)
- Ten koste van een hagedis (1969)
- Corsetten voor een libel (1970)
- Mijn vader inspecteerde iedere avond de Nijl (1970)
- Noach (1970)
- De nagel achter het behang (1972)
- Blaffen zonder onraad (1972)
- Vanwege een tere huid (1973)
- Een punaise in de voet (1974)
- De geluiden van de eerste dag (1975)
- Tot waar zal ik je brengen? (1976)
- De laatste goendroen (1977)
- Een kind in de toren (1977)
- Een pak slaag (1978)
- Nieuwe maan (1978)
- Raadpleeg de meerval (1980)
- Een aanzienlijke vertraging (1981)
- Liefdes tredmolen en andere dierenverhalen (1985)
- Alle dierenverhalen (1990)

== Filmography ==
- De Dijk is Dicht (1950)
- Everyman (1963)
- The Voice of the Water (1966)
- Ape and Super-Ape (1972)
- When the Poppies Bloom Again (1975)
- Mr. Slotter's Jubilee (1979)
- Juliana in Seventy Turbulent Years (1979)
