= Ape and Super-Ape =

1972 film directed by Bert Haanstra

- Film poster
- Directed by: Bert Haanstra
- Written by: Bert Haanstra; Anton Koolhaas
- Produced by: Bert Haanstra
- Narrated by: Anton Koolhaas; Alexander Scourby
- Cinematography: Anton van Munster
- Edited by: Bert Haanstra
- Music by: Otto Ketting
- Distributed by: Ministry of Culture, Recreation and Social Welfare
- Release date: 1972
- Running time: 104 minutes
- Country: Netherlands
- Language: Dutch

Ape and Super-Ape (Dutch: Bij de beesten af) is a 1972 Dutch documentary film directed by Bert Haanstra. It was nominated for an Academy Award for Best Documentary Feature.

The film is also notable for featuring extensive documentary footage of the life of penguins on Antarctica 33 years before another documentary film, March of the Penguins (2005) focused on the same subject.

== Overview ==
The film is a study of the differences and similarities between human and animal behaviour. The first part of the movie focuses on the behaviour of various animal species. The second half is about the behaviour of humans, often intercutting with footage of animal behaviour. In the original Dutch version writer Anton Koolhaas, who also wrote the script, provided the voice-over.

Haanstra had already shown interest in human and animal behaviour in his previous films, like Zoo (1961). Ape and Super-Ape analyzed these similarities on a much larger scale. In preparation for this documentary Haanstra and his camera crew traveled across the world for three years. They filmed animals and people in many different continents (Africa and Antarctica get extensive attention), while the well known Dutch ethnologist Gerard Baerendts was consulted for scientific advice.

Haanstra would later make two other documentaries about animals: Nationale parken... noodzaak (1978) and Chimps onder elkaar (1984).
