= Keetje Tippel =

Katie Tippel
- movie poster for Katie Tippel
- Directed by: Paul Verhoeven
- Written by: Neel Doff; Gerard Soeteman
- Produced by: Rob Houwer
- Starring: Monique van de Ven; Rutger Hauer
- Cinematography: Jan de Bont
- Edited by: Jane Sperr
- Music by: Rogier van Otterloo
- Production company: Rob Houwer Film Holland B.V.
- Distributed by: Tuschinski Distribution
- Release date: 6 March 1975
- Running time: 107 minutes
- Country: Netherlands
- Language: Dutch
- Budget: $800,000
- Box office: 1.8 million admissions (Netherlands)

Katie Tippel (Dutch title: Keetje Tippel) is a 1975 film by Paul Verhoeven. The film is based on the memoirs of Neel Doff (1858–1942) and was the most expensive Dutch film produced up to that time. The film was a box office success, being the number one film in the Netherlands for the year with 1.8 million admissions, and one of the top 10 most popular Dutch films of all time at the time.

== Plot ==
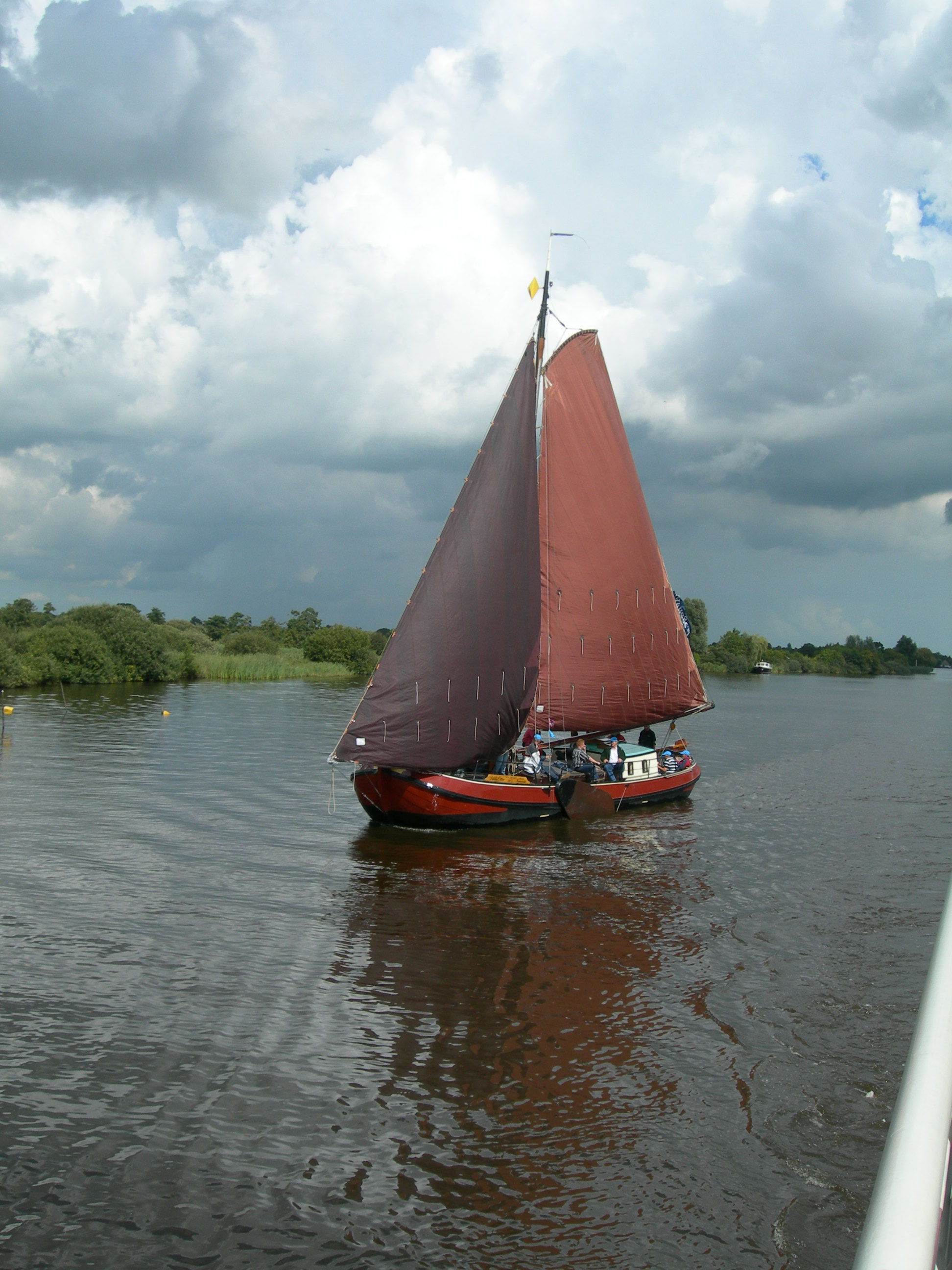
The family moves to Amsterdam on a skûtsje, a Frisian sailing ship like the one pictured here.

In 1881, in Stavoren, a small Dutch rural town in the province of Friesland, Katie's family move to Amsterdam, where they hope to escape grinding poverty by finding work. Upon arrival, Katie secures employment at a dye-works, but is fired when she refuses to have sex with the director. She finds a job at a hat shop, where, during a business trip to a brothel, she discovers her older sister Mina working there. Later that evening, back at the hat shop, she is brutally raped by the owner and, in revenge, smashes the shop window.

Weeks go by, during which Katie's father works in a factory on low pay and Mina descends into alcoholism. While attempting to steal bread, Katie is knocked unconscious by a policeman and taken to a sanitorium. It becomes apparent that her body is her only asset as a doctor diagnoses tuberculosis, but refuses treatment unless she sleeps with him. It is unclear whether this occurs, but on her discharge Katie rejoins her family and discovers her father has been sacked and her sister is too drunk to sleep with clients. Katie's mother decides that, rather than the family starve, Katie must also go into prostitution.

Her first client is a gentleman, whom Katie does not satisfy due to her inexperience. Her second client, an artist called George, takes her to his studio to pose for a painting depicting a Socialist revolution. He pays her the rate they negotiated for her services, but tells her he only wants her to model. He introduces Katie to Hugo, a banker, and Andre, a wealthy socialist, and they head to a nightclub for a meal. Katie's re-education has begun. Andre is attracted to Katie, but she seems enamoured with Hugo, with whom she goes home and sleeps. Hugo provides Katie with money for a new dress and they arrange to meet in the park. It is here that Katie's former life threatens to catch up with her when the gentleman she approached a few days earlier recognises her and informs Hugo he knew Katie when she only cost fifty cents. Hugo punches him, refusing to believe his story and promises Katie that she can move in with him "forever". Katie goes to see her family, informing them she intends to leave. Her mother asks how she will feed the children if Katie's not there to provide. Katie tells her mother she "should have fucked less" and storms out, kicking her hysterical mother who tries to prevent her from leaving.

Once at Hugo's, Katie settles into the life of the bourgeoisie but is soon troubled at having to go spying on some of Amsterdam's less affluent shop owners to see whom Hugo should refuse credit to. After being exposed in a coffee shop, and as a result, hot chocolate is thrown in her face, Katie tells Hugo she will not do his dirty work anymore. Very soon Hugo informs Katie that he intends to marry the daughter of the director of the bank he works at. Although Hugo proposes an arrangement even after he will marry, Katie runs out onto the street and joins in a socialist march. The police arrive to break it up, opening fire on the marchers. During the confusion, Katie is reunited with George and Andre who are also present. Andre is shot in the arm and collapses, hitting his head. George takes them to a carriage waiting nearby and Andre and Katie board it, taking them to Andre's country mansion. Katie stays with him and, when he awakes, it becomes apparent that romance will blossom between the two. They discuss the subject of money, Katie telling Andre that "money turns people into bastards". When Andre's headwound begins to bleed, Katie informs Andre that the best cure is to suck the blood. "That's better", she says, a sliver of blood running from the corner of her mouth. The picture freezes and a roller-caption appears informing us that the film is based on true events from the life of Neel Doff and that "her indomitable spirit lives on in this film".

== Cast ==
- Monique van de Ven as Keetje "Tippel" Oldema
- Rutger Hauer as Hugo
- Peter Faber as George
- Andrea Domburg as Keetje's Moeder
- Hannah de Leeuwe as Mina, Keetje's zus
- Jan Blaaser as Keetje's Vader
- Eddie Brugman as André
- Jennifer Willems as Antoinette

== Original ending ==
The film was to feature an epilogue set several years in the future where Katie, now married to Andre, would be sat reading. As the noise from those starving in the street becomes unbearable, Katie rises and closes the open window to shut out the sound. Her journey is now complete, Katie becoming one of the "bastards" she despises. However, producer Rob Houwer decided this was too downbeat as an ending, so it was never filmed.

== Production ==
Gerard Soeteman's original script for the film was substantially longer, Katie's journey mirroring the growth of Socialism in the Netherlands during the late 19th century. Owing to budgetary restrictions from the Dutch Government and Rob Houwer many of the more lavish scenes were cut, placing the emphasis less upon the period the film is set than upon Katie herself.

== Music ==
The soundtrack was composed by Rogier van Otterloo, but unlike other film music was never published on LP. Only years later when a CD was released with the collected works of Van Otterloo, the music of the opening titles became available in mono from the film's soundtrack.

In the film, the song "The Money Is on the Streets" is sung by Riet Henius. This song, the text of which was co-written with Alexander Pola, became a single. On the B-side are two pieces of music by Willem Breuker, which are referred to as clips from the movie, but are not heard in the film.

== Reception ==
In the Chicago Sun-Times, Roger Ebert gave the film 2 and a half stars out of 4, praising van De Van's performance, but criticizing the actress for "tending to break out into infectious grins and nose-twitching" in serious scenes, as well as the quick developments of the plot, suggesting that "[I]t’s as if a real human presence, a winning personality, is making its way past all the barriers of story and philosophy and letting us in on the joke", despite the original intentions of Verhoeven.

The New York Times' film review stated that the film was "one of the most gorgeous movies of the year."

== Intertextuality ==
Verhoeven has since stated that this is the only film of his he has ever considered remaking. There are numerous echoes of this film in the controversial 1995 movie Showgirls. Black Book (2006) also features a strong-willed female character whose quest for identity becomes blurred.
