= Blue Movie (1971 film) =

- Dutch theatrical release poster
- Directed by: Wim Verstappen
- Written by: Charles Gormley; Wim Verstappen
- Produced by: Pim de la Parra; Dieter Geissler
- Starring: Hugo Metsers; Carry Tefsen
- Cinematography: Jan de Bont; Werner Leckebusch
- Edited by: Jutta Brandstaedter
- Music by: Jürgen Drews; Les Humphries
- Production company: Scorpio Films
- Distributed by: Actueel Film (Netherlands); Dieter Geissler Filmproduktion (Germany)
- Release dates: 16 July 1971 (West Germany); 30 September 1971 (Netherlands)
- Running time: 88 minutes
- Countries: Netherlands; West Germany
- Language: Dutch
- Box office: $0.6 million (Netherlands rentals)

Blue Movie (German title: Das Porno-Haus von Amsterdam) is a German/Dutch film from 1971. The film was directed by Wim Verstappen, written by Verstappen and Charles Gormley, and stars Hugo Metsers and Carry Tefsen. The film was controversial at the time for being the first Dutch theatrical movie to show sex scenes and an erection. Originally the Central Commission for Film Approval didn't allow its release, but director Verstappen wrote a letter of defense, claiming the picture was a criticism of society. The film was greenlighted and became a box office success, one of the most attended films in Dutch film history with admissions of over 2.3 million.

== Plot ==
Michael is a convicted sex offender, who has just served several years in prison for sexual abuse of a minor and molesting a fellow inmate. After his release, he is supervised by a probation officer and placed in an apartment in the Bijlmer. He introduces himself to his neighbor Elly and has a cup of coffee with her, which marks the beginning of a sexual relationship between the two.

It turns out the apartment complex's inhabitants hold rather loose morals: borrowing a cup of sugar is enough to end up in bed with someone. Michael cautiously takes his first steps into this new world, but quickly feels at home. He falls in love with the unmarried mother Julia, but she keeps her distance from these sexual excesses. Meanwhile, Michael sets up a sort of private sex club with his neighbors and organizes erotic parties in the apartment building. Every now and then, Eddie, the probation officer, pops in and watches with growing astonishment at what is happening around Michael.

When someone commits suicide by jumping off the balcony at one of the parties, all hell breaks loose. Michael is brought back down to earth by his neighbor Kohn and puts a stop to his wild life. One evening, he makes another attempt with Julia, and whereas her neighbor Anna had been a nuisance during their first meeting, the path is now clear. But when he finally gets to sleep with her, he finds he can’t get an erection.

== Cast ==
- Hugo Metsers as Michael
- Carry Tefsen as Elly, neighbor
- Wim de Meijer as Arthur, her husband
- Ine Veen as Julia, single neighbor with child
- Kees Brusse as Bernard Kohn, zoologist
- Ursula Blauth as Marianne Kohn, his wife
- Helmert Woudenberg as Eddie Faithfull, probation officer
- Jacques Luijer as Wesley
- Brûni Heinke as girl at prison
- Bill van Dijk as flat visitor
- Wim Poncia as rejected party guest
- Monique Smal as Anna
- Mimi Kok as neighbor
- Johan te Slaa as sex shop owner
- Willem Sibbelee as neighbor
- Marijke Boonstra as Raouma
- Etha Coster as girl in the shop
- Kaja Knies as Julia's daughter
- Jan Mey as doctor
- Henno Eggenkamp as Erotisch Panorama
- Arlette Lohmeier as girl at the party
- Ina Wallet as Anna's friend
- Dieter Geissler as man at the party
