= The Family of Chimps =

1984 film

- Directed by: Bert Haanstra
- Written by: Bert Haanstra
- Produced by: Bert Haanstra
- Narrated by: Bert Haanstra
- Edited by: Bert Haanstra
- Music by: Jurre Haanstra
- Release date: 1984
- Running time: 55 minutes
- Country: Netherlands
- Language: Dutch

The Family of Chimps (Dutch: Chimps onder elkaar) is a 1984 Dutch documentary film directed by Bert Haanstra. The film is a study of the behaviour of a family of chimpanzees in Burgers' Zoo in Arnhem in the Netherlands. The documentary was inspired by the 1982 book Chimpansee politiek (Chimpanzee politics) by primatologist and ethologist Frans de Waal.
