= Jan de Bont =

Dutch film director

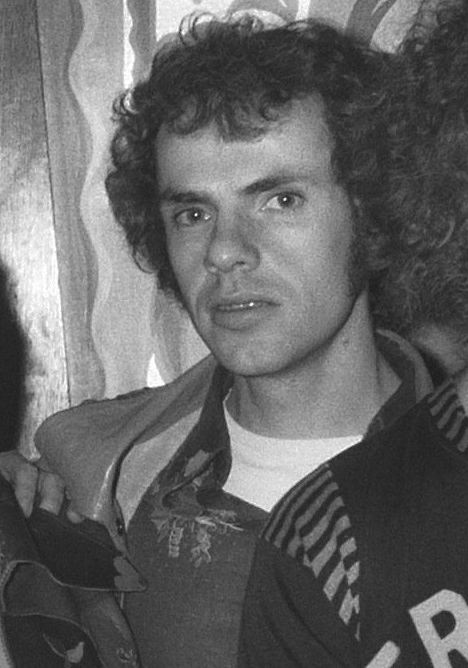
- De Bont in 1973
- Born: 22 October 1943 (age 83); Eindhoven, Netherlands
- Occupations: Film director; producer; cinematographer
- Years active: 1966–1992 (Cinematography); 1994–2003 (Director)
- Spouses: Monique van de Ven (m. 1973; div. 1988): Trish Reeves
- Children: 2

Jan de Bont (Dutch: [ˈjɑn də ˈbɔnt]; born 22 October 1943) is a Dutch retired film director, producer, and a former cinematographer.

As director, he's best known for action and adventure films such as Speed (1994) and Twister (1996). As cinematographer, he is known for blockbusters and genre films, including Die Hard (1988), The Hunt for Red October (1990), Lethal Weapon 3 (1992), and Basic Instinct (1992).

== Early life ==
De Bont was born to a Roman Catholic family in Eindhoven, Netherlands, one of 17 children.

== Career ==
=== Cinematographer ===
His earliest works were made while studying at the Amsterdam Film Academy with Dutch avant-garde director Adriaan Ditvoorst.

He first became known in the Netherlands as the cinematographer for the infamous Blue Movie in 1971, followed by the Turkish Delight (1973), directed by Paul Verhoeven.

After Max Havelaar, he worked frequently in American films during the 1980s.

While serving as cinematographer for the 1981 film Roar, de Bont was one of the many crew members to suffer on-set injuries, with a lion lifting his scalp. The injury required 220 stitches.

In 1988, he was director of photography on the critically acclaimed action film Die Hard.

=== Director ===
De Bont made his directorial debut with the sleeper hit action thriller Speed. He followed this up with the even more successful Twister in 1996.

His output since has had mixed reception. In 1997, he returned to direct Speed's sequel Cruise Control, which fared much worse both critically and commercially. In 1999, he oversaw the commercially successful remake of The Haunting, which also received negative reviews from critics.

De Bont's final directorial outing was the 2003 action adventure film Lara Croft: Tomb Raider – The Cradle of Life, sequel to the 2001 film.

==== Unrealised projects ====
De Bont began pre-production on an American Godzilla film for a summer 1996 release, but quit at the end of 1994 when Sony Pictures Entertainment (Columbia Pictures and TriStar Pictures's parent company) refused to approve his budget request. He was eventually replaced by Roland Emmerich, who rewrote the script in addition to directing. While critically panned, Emmerich's Godzilla was moderately successful at the box-office.

At one point, de Bont mooted an asteroid/space shuttle disaster film project called Galileo's Wake as a possible follow-up to Speed 2: Cruise Control.

In 1997, de Bont was originally attached to direct the film Minority Report, which Steven Spielberg would end up directing instead. Also that year, de Bont was attached to direct Supertanker at Centropolis Entertainment. Bill Pullman and Samuel L. Jackson were set to star to the film. In May that same year it was reported the 20th Century Fox thriller film Zero Hour would be his next film; though he would drop out by the end of the year.

In February 1998, Fox optioned the rights to Gregory Benford's sci-fi novel Cosm for de Bont's Blue Tulip Productions to produce as a feature film, with Robert Collins attached as script writer. In March he was developing to produce and direct the action film Pathfinder for Paramount Pictures. By September, he was confirmed to additionally direct Cosm. Other projects touted as potential directing vehicles for de Bont that year included the Tazio Nuvolari biopic Nuvolari, the time travel thriller Old City, and the thriller Hindenberg.

In 1999 it was announced that he would direct The Adaptive Ultimate for Fox, with Nicole Kidman attached to star but her schedule was too busy to commit at the time.

In January 2000, it was reported that de Bont would take on Dust as his next film, which would have been based upon the novel of the same name by Charles Pellegrino. De Bont planned to develop the script with his production partner Lucas Foster under his company label, Blue Tulip, based on an adaptation already written by Ted Humphrey. Peter Dowling, Patrick Massett and John Zinman also worked on the script.

In June 2000, de Bont was considering directing either Adventures of the Stainless Steel Rat, Food, LAX, or The 28th Amendment as his next film. None of the projects were produced, though the latter was reportedly further developed with Artists Production Group for Warner Bros.

More recently, de Bont was attached as the director of an early version of The Meg, the Dracula sequel The Undead, the John Cusack action thriller vehicle Stopping Power, the Point Break sequel Indo, the live action Mulan, which would have starred Zhang Ziyi, as well as a proposed remake of the Johnny Cash film Five Minutes to Live written by Raul Inglis.

De Bont's passion project, a film titled Riders in the Sky, about Indian tribes in the Midwest has been stuck in development hell for many years. "It was a beautiful story, very imaginative," said de Bont. The project went as far as locations having already been scouted and the sets designed before being cancelled.

== Filmography ==
Year	Title	Director	Producer	Notes
1994	Speed	Yes	No	
1996	Twister	Yes	No	
1997	Speed 2: Cruise Control	Yes	Yes	Also story writer
1998	SLC Punk!	No	Executive	
1999	The Haunting	Yes	Executive	
2002	Equilibrium	No	Yes	
2002	Minority Report	No	Yes	
2003	Lara Croft: Tomb Raider – The Cradle of Life	Yes	No	
2003	Thoughtcrimes	No	Executive	Television film
2012	The Paperboy	No	Executive	

=== Cinematographer credits ===
Short film

Year	Title	Director	Notes
1966	Ik kom wat later naar Madra	Adriaan Ditvoorst	With Jaap de Jonge
1966	Body and Soul	Rene Daalder	Documentary short
1969	Carna	Adriaan Ditvoorst	With Theo van de Sande and Piotr van Dijk

Feature film

Year	Title	Director	Notes
1966	De minder gelukkige terugkeer van Joszef Katus naar het land van Rembrandt	Wim Verstappen	With Wim van der Linden
1967	Paranoia	Adriaan Ditvoorst	
1969	De blanke slavin	Rene Daalder	With Oliver Wood
1969	Drop Out	Wim Verstappen	With Frans Bromet and Theo van de Sande
1971	Blue Movie	Wim Verstappen	With Werner Leckebusch
1971	Business Is Business	Paul Verhoeven	
1972	João and the Knife	George Sluizer	
1972	Kapsalon	Frans Rasker	
1973	Turkish Delight	Paul Verhoeven	
1973	The Family	Lodewijk de Boer	
1973	De blinde fotograaf	Adriaan Ditvoorst	
1974	Dakota	Wim Verstappen	With Theo van de Sande
1975	Keetje Tippel	Paul Verhoeven	
1975	De laatste trein	Erik van Zuylen	
1976	Max Havelaar	Fons Rademakers	
1978	Formula 1 - Febbre della velocità	Ottavio Fabbri; Mario Morra; Oscar Orefici; Pietro Rizzo	Uncredited
1981	Private Lessons	Alan Myerson	
1981	Night Warning	William Asher	Uncredited
1981	Roar	Noel Marshall	Also supervising editor
1982	I'm Dancing as Fast as I Can	Jack Hofsiss	
1982	Breach of Contract	Andre R. Guttfreund	
1983	The Fourth Man	Paul Verhoeven	
1983	Cujo	Lewis Teague	
1983	All the Right Moves	Michael Chapman	
1984	Bad Manners	Robert Houston	
1984	American Dreamer	Rick Rosenthal	With Giuseppe Rotunno
1985	Flesh & Blood	Paul Verhoeven	
1985	The Jewel of the Nile	Lewis Teague	
1986	The Clan of the Cave Bear	Michael Chapman	
1986	Ruthless People	Jim Abrahams; David Zucker; Jerry Zucker	
1987	Who's That Girl	James Foley	
1987	Leonard Part 6	Paul Weiland	
1988	Die Hard	John McTiernan	
1989	Bert Rigby, You're a Fool	Carl Reiner	
1989	Black Rain	Ridley Scott	
1990	The Hunt for Red October	John McTiernan	
1990	Flatliners	Joel Schumacher	
1992	Shining Through	David Seltzer	
1992	Basic Instinct	Paul Verhoeven	
1992	Lethal Weapon 3	Richard Donner	Also made an uncredited cameo as "Dutch Cameraman"
2012	Nema aviona za Zagreb	Louis van Gasteren	Filmed during the 1960s

TV movies

Year	Title	Director	Notes
1966	Bah, September	Ruud van Hemert	
1973	51 minuten Ko van Dijk	Paul Haenen; Gied Jaspars	Uncredited
1985	Heart of a Champion: The Ray Mancini Story	Richard Michaels	
1990	Parker Kane	Steve Perry	

TV series

Year	Title	Director	Episode
1969	Swing In	Wim van der Linden	"Jethro Tull"
1992	Tales from the Crypt	Joel Silver	"Split Personality"

== Accolades ==
Year	Award	Category	Title	Result
1995	Saturn Awards	Best Director	Speed	Nominated
1997	Stinkers Bad Movie Awards	Worst Sense of Direction (Stop them before they direct again!)	Speed 2: Cruise Control	Nominated
1999	Stinkers Bad Movie Awards	Worst Sense of Direction (Stop them before they direct again!)	The Haunting	Nominated
1998	Golden Raspberry Awards	Worst Picture	Speed 2: Cruise Control	Nominated
1998	Golden Raspberry Awards	Worst Director	Speed 2: Cruise Control	Nominated
1998	Golden Raspberry Awards	Worst Screenplay	Speed 2: Cruise Control	Nominated
2000	Golden Raspberry Awards	Worst Director	The Haunting	Nominated
