= Mirror of Holland =

1950 film

- Directed by: Bert Haanstra
- Written by: Bert Haanstra; Koen van Os
- Produced by: Piet van Moock
- Cinematography: Bert Haanstra
- Edited by: Bert Haanstra
- Release date: 1950
- Running time: 10 minutes
- Country: Netherlands
- Language: Dutch

Mirror of Holland (Dutch: Spiegel van Holland) is a 1950 short Dutch documentary film about The Netherlands, directed by Bert Haanstra. It was Haanstra's first success abroad and won the Short Film Palme d'Or at the 1951 Cannes Film Festival.
