= Netherlands Film Fund =

Subsidy fund for Dutch film productions

The Netherlands Film Fund (Dutch: Nederlands Filmfonds) is a subsidy fund for Dutch film productions and was founded in 1993. The Netherlands Film Fund is itself mainly subsidized by the Dutch Ministry of Education, Culture and Science. In 2007, the total budget of the fund was €33,000,000.

The fund gave €651,174 subsidy to the film Character (1997) and €578,570 to the film Black Book (2006).

Since 2001, the Netherlands Film Fund and the Netherlands Film Festival recognize box office results of Dutch films with awards. Currently, there are four different box office awards: the Crystal Film (10,000 visitors for documentary films), the Golden Film (100,000 visitors), the Platinum Film (400,000 visitors), and the Diamond Film (1,000,000 visitors).
