= Fanfare (film) =

1958 film

- Directed by: Bert Haanstra
- Written by: Jan Blokker; Bert Haanstra
- Produced by: Rudolf Meyer
- Starring: Hans Kaart
- Cinematography: Eduard van der Enden
- Edited by: Bert Haanstra; Ralph Sheldon
- Music by: Jan Mul
- Release date: 24 October 1958
- Running time: 93 minutes
- Country: Netherlands
- Language: Dutch
- Box office: 2.6 million admissions (Netherlands)

Fanfare is a 1958 Dutch comedy film directed by Bert Haanstra. The film was entered into the 1959 Cannes Film Festival and the 1st Moscow International Film Festival. It was the most successful Dutch film at the time with over 2.6 million admissions until it was surpassed by the 1973 film Turkish Delight.

== Cast ==
- Hans Kaart as Geursen
- Bernhard Droog as Krijns
- Ineke Brinkman as Marije
- Wim van den Heuvel as Douwe
- Andrea Domburg as Lies
- Albert Mol as Schalm
- Henk van Buuren as Valentijn
- Herbert Joeks as Koendering
- Johan Valk as Van Ogten
- Ton Lutz as Altena
- Riek Schagen as Aaltje
- Sara Heyblom as Leidster van vereniging
- Dio Huysmans as Zwaansdijk
