= Glass (1958 film) =

Film by Bert Haanstra

- Directed by: Bert Haanstra
- Produced by: Bert Haanstra
- Music by: Pim Jacobs, performed by The Pim Jacobs Quintet
- Release date: 1958
- Running time: 11 minutes
- Country: Netherlands
- Language: Dutch

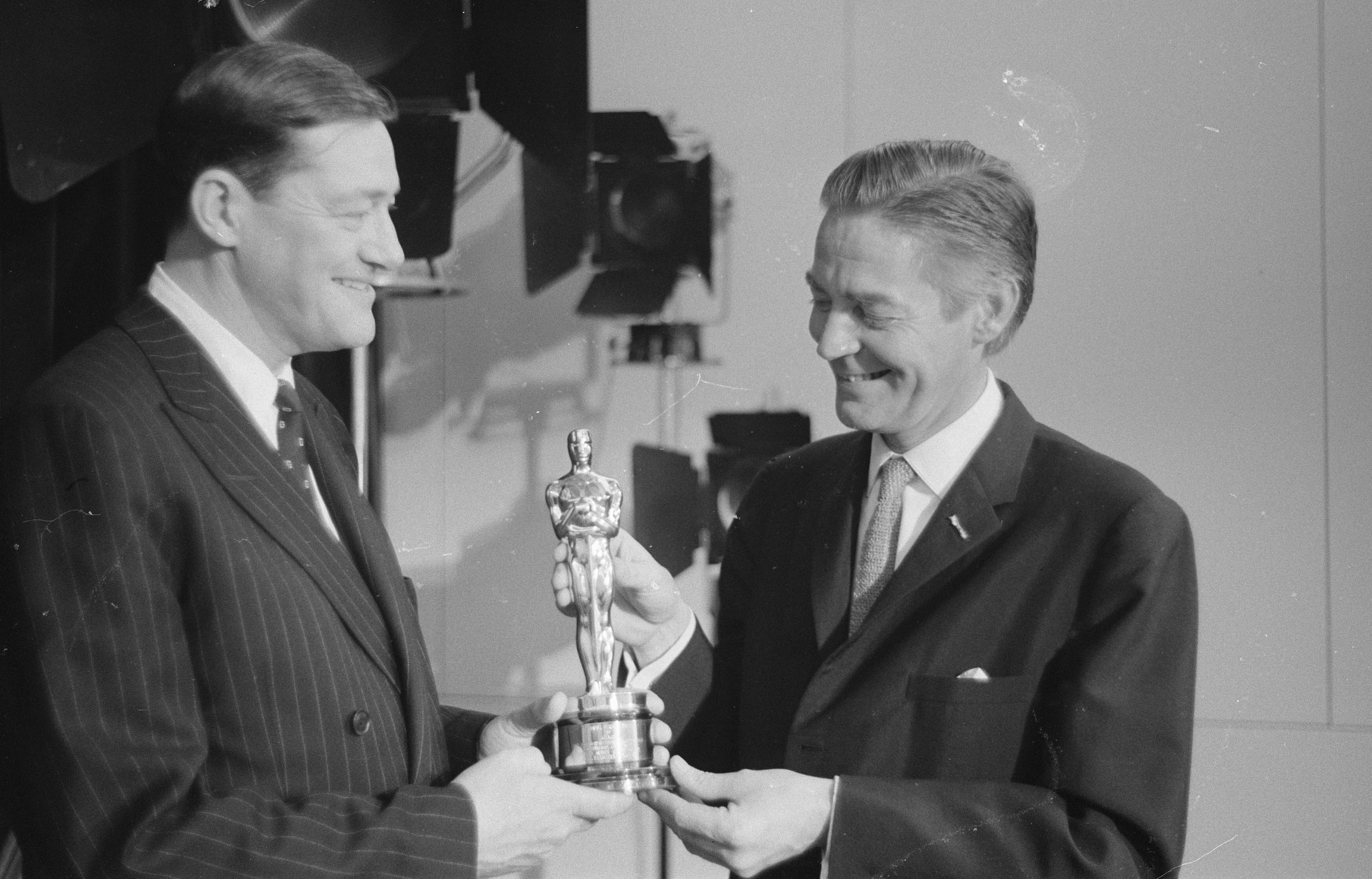
Haanstra receives Academy Award.

Glass (Dutch: Glas) is a 1958 Dutch short documentary film by director and producer Bert Haanstra. The film won the Oscar for Documentary Short Subject in 1959. The film is about the glass industry in the Netherlands. It contrasts the handmade crystal from the Royal Leerdam Glass Factory with automated bottle making machines. Short segments of artisans making various glass goods by hand are joined with those of mass production. It is often acclaimed to be the perfect short documentary.
