= Crystal Film =

Dutch film box office achievement

- Awarded for: Box office achievements
- Country: Netherlands
- Presented by: Netherlands Film Festival; Netherlands Film Fund
- First award: 21 June 2005
- Website: http://www.kristallenfilm.nl/

The Crystal Film (Dutch: Kristallen Film) is a film award recognising domestic box office achievements in the Netherlands. The Crystal Film is awarded to documentary films from the Netherlands once they have sold 10,000 tickets.

The award is an initiative of the Netherlands Film Festival and the Netherlands Film Fund to increase media attention for Dutch documentary films, in addition to the existing Golden Film and Platinum Film for Dutch films in general. They announced the introduction of the Crystal Film on 28 April 2005. The first Crystal Film was awarded on 21 June 2005 to Shape of the Moon (2004). Since its introduction, the Crystal Film has been awarded to twelve films. (Note: As of 22 January 2014.)

== Films that received the Crystal Film ==
Crystal Film for 10,000 tickets sold
Year	#	Film	Release date	Crystal Film
2005	1	Shape of the Moon	6 January 2005	21 June 2005
2005	2	Souls of Naples	18 August 2005	21 December 2005
2006	3	Buddha's Lost Children	7 September 2006	25 September 2006
2006	4	Forever	12 October 2006	23 November 2006
2007	5	4 Elements	30 November 2006	10 January 2007
2007	6	Goud	4 October 2007	17 October 2007
2008	7	El ovido	23 October 2008	11 December 2008
2009	8	Contractpensions - Djangan loepah!	18 January 2008	29 September 2009
2010	9	Janine	7 October 2010	16 November 2010
2011	10	Position Among the Stars	18 November 2010	22 April 2011
2011	11	Ouwehoeren	1 December 2011	30 December 2011
2012	12	Over canto	8 December 2011	12 February 2012
