= Houen zo! =

1953 film by Herman van der Horst

- Directed by: Herman van der Horst
- Release date: 1952
- Running time: 20 minutes
- Country: Netherlands
- Language: Dutch

Houen zo!, which has also been released as Steady!, is a Dutch short documentary film from 1952, directed by Herman van der Horst. The film shows the reconstruction of Rotterdam, following the city's destruction by the Nazis in the Rotterdam Blitz.

The film begins its journey through the city at the severely damaged St. Lawrence Church, followed by the port and major building sites in the city. The film is a poetic impression of the work done, without any commentary. The film heralds a new era, of hope and joy.

The film was commissioned and financed by the Mutual Security Agency (MSA) of the Marshall Plan, and "made for a national and an international audience, to show the spirit of the Dutch, and what the country was able to do. The city is presented as a model of reconstruction achievements, and of Dutch modernity."

Steady! won the first prize for nonfiction short at the Cannes Film Festival (1953).
