= The Human Dutch =

1963 film

- Directed by: Bert Haanstra
- Written by: Simon Carmiggelt; Bert Haanstra; Anton Koolhaas
- Produced by: Bert Haanstra
- Narrated by: Simon Carmiggelt; Peter Ustinov
- Cinematography: Anton van Munster
- Edited by: Bert Haanstra
- Release date: 1963
- Running time: 90 minutes
- Country: Netherlands
- Language: Dutch
- Box office: 1,663,743 admissions (Netherlands)

The Human Dutch (Dutch: Alleman, lit. 'everyman') is a 1963 Dutch documentary film directed by Bert Haanstra, about the daily lives of people in the Netherlands. It was a big success in the Netherlands with almost 1.7 million admissions, the third most successful Dutch film at the time. It was nominated for an Academy Award for Best Documentary Feature. It was also selected as the Dutch entry for the Best Foreign Language Film at the 37th Academy Awards, but was not accepted as a nominee.

== Cast ==
- Simon Carmiggelt - Narrator (Dutch version) (voice)
- Peter Ustinov - Narrator (English version) (voice)

== See also ==
- List of submissions to the 37th Academy Awards for Best Foreign Language Film
- List of Dutch submissions for the Academy Award for Best Foreign Language Film
