= Adventures in Perception =

1971 film

- Directed by: Han Van Gelder
- Produced by: Han Van Gelder
- Release date: 1971
- Running time: 21 minutes
- Country: Netherlands
- Language: Dutch

Adventures in Perception is a 1971 Dutch short documentary film directed by Han Van Gelder. It was nominated for an Academy Award for Best Documentary Short, and won the Best Short Film on Art at the 1971 Cork Film Festival. It is a study on the works of M. C. Escher.
