= Bert Haanstra =

Dutch film director (1916–1997)

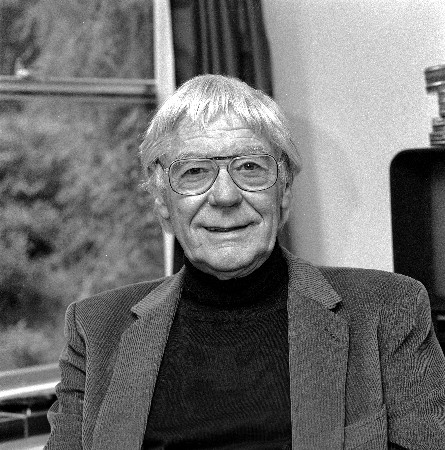
- Haanstra in 1989
- Born: Albert Haanstra; 31 May 1916; Holten, Netherlands
- Died: 23 October 1997 (aged 81); Hilversum, Netherlands
- Occupation(s): Photographer, cameraman, film director
- Years active: 1948–1988 (film director)
- Spouse: Nita Wijtmans
- Children: Rimko and Jurre
- Website: www.berthaanstra.nl

Albert Haanstra (Dutch pronunciation: [ˈɑlbərd bɛrt ˈɦaːnstraː]; 31 May 1916 – 23 October 1997) was a Dutch director of films and documentaries. His documentary Glass (1958) won the Academy Award for Documentary Short Subject in 1959. His feature film Fanfare (1958) was the most visited Dutch film at the time, and has since only been surpassed by Turkish Delight (1973).

== Early life ==
Albert Haanstra was born on 31 May 1916 in Espelo, a small village near Holten, in the Netherlands. His father was Folkert Haanstra, a schoolteacher, and his mother Jansje Schuiveling. Haanstra grew up in the village of Goor. Because he lived during the poverty of the 1920s, Haanstra grew up with the mindset that to get the most out of life, he would need to work hard and live below his means to survive. Haanstra's father retired early as a schoolteacher and started his lifelong dream of becoming a painter. Haanstra himself, after realizing teaching didn't interest him, became a painter himself and started experimenting with photography.

Through his fascination, Haanstra became friends with a local cinema owner who eventually would let him see movies for free from the projection room, where Haanstra's desire to dabble in cinema would grow. By collecting scrap equipment that had been thrown away, Haanstra made a homemade projector, and after doing odd jobs around his village to earn money, he bought films from a local store to play them on his projector. He was later accepted into Royal Netherlands Academy of Arts and Sciences but would subsequently turn it down as he felt that the long years of study would be nothing in comparison to real life experience. During his later employment as a press photographer, Haanstra experimented in staged photography, where he would create his first film, Catfish.

== Career ==
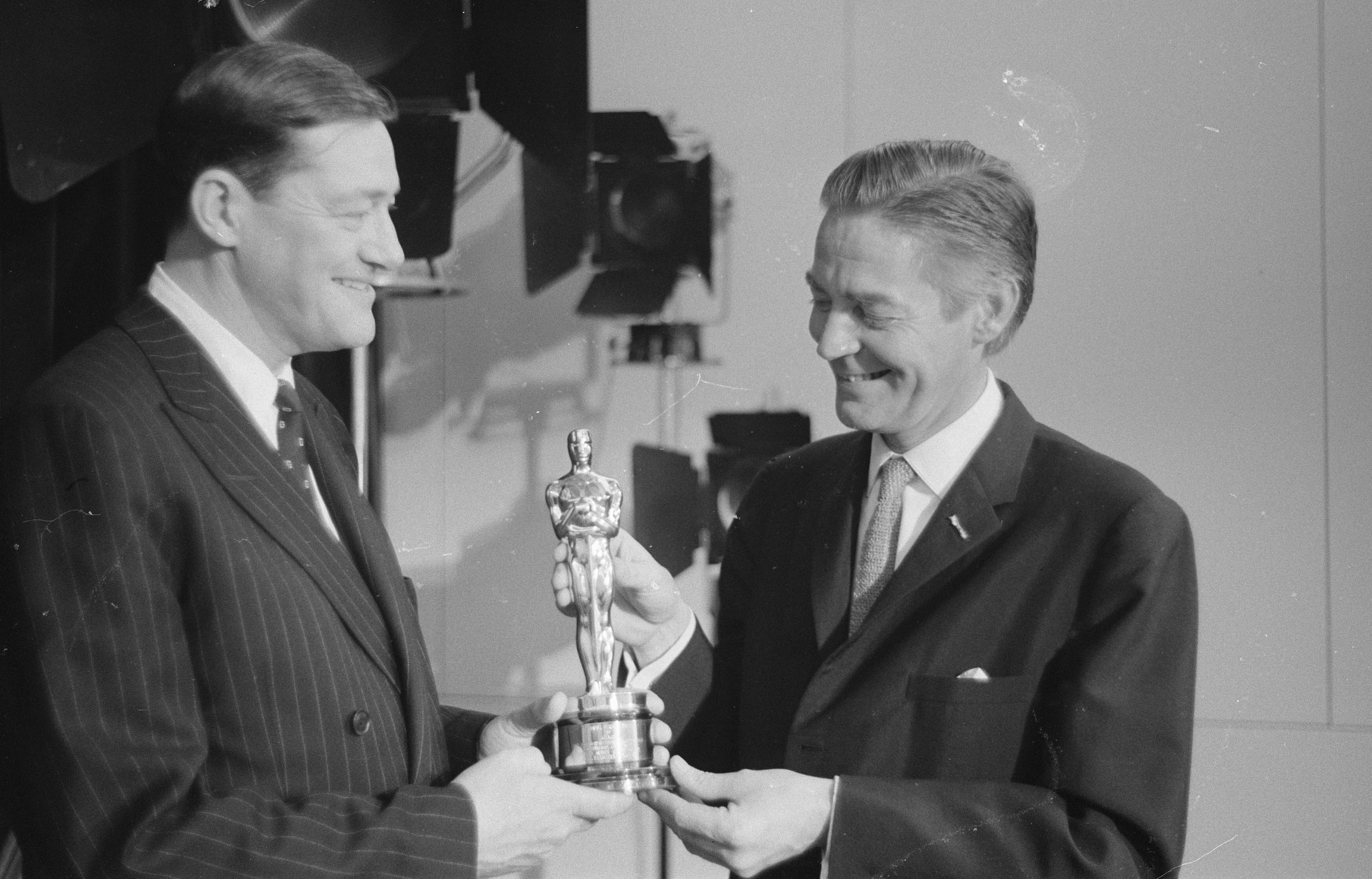
Haanstra receives his Academy Award for Glass from Ambassador Philip Young in 1959.

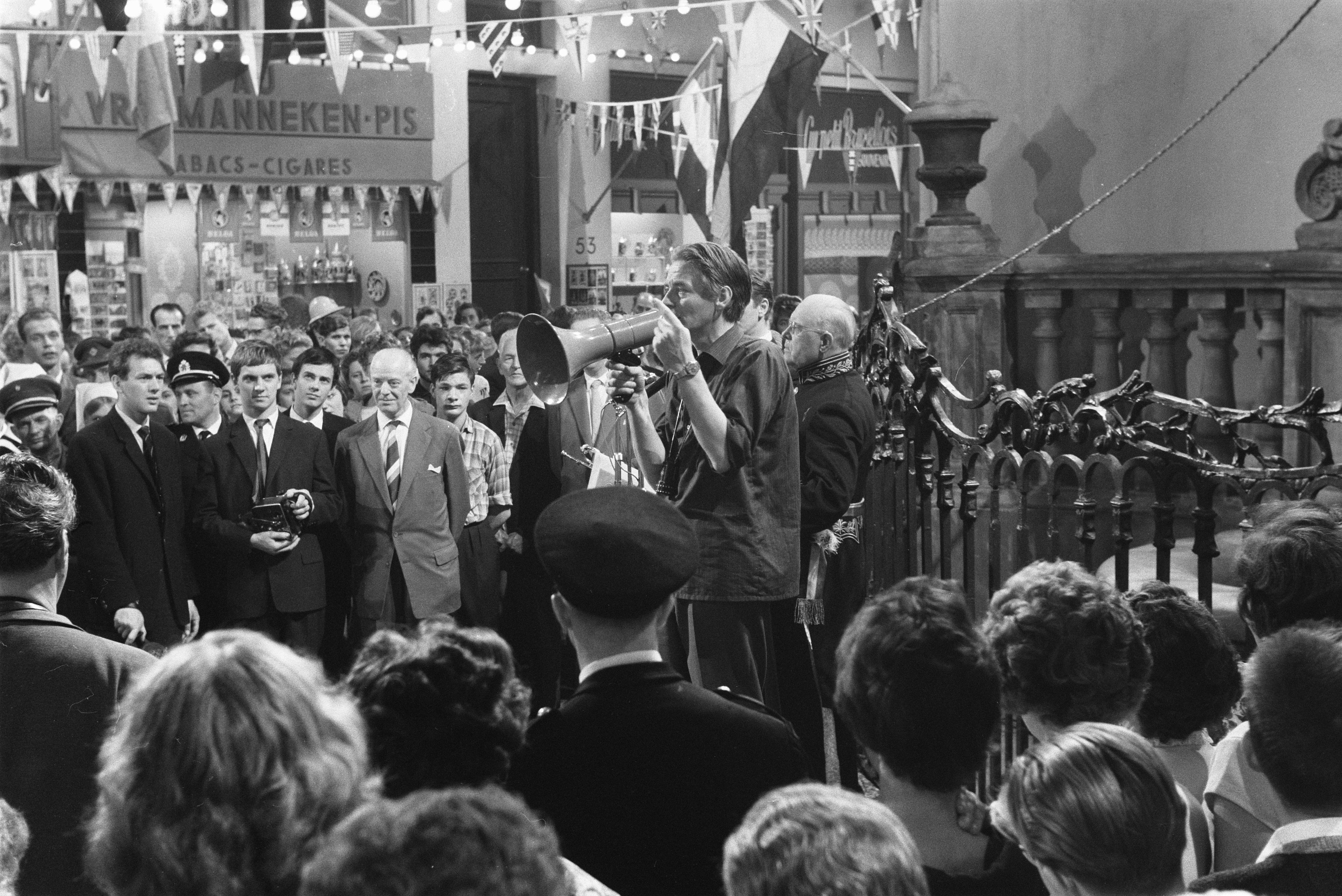
Haanstra gives instructions on the film set of De Zaak M.P. in 1960.

Haanstra became a professional Dutch documentary film maker in 1947. He won international acclaim with his short documentary Spiegel van Holland (Mirror of Holland), for which he received the Grand Prix du court métrage at the Cannes Film Festival of 1951. During the fifties he made six films for Shell, among others The Rival World (1955) on insects spreading deadly diseases and how to fight them. In 1958 his documentary Glass, a filming improvisation made in a glass factory, won an Academy Award for Best Documentary Short Subject. Due to the increasing trend of the poetic mode documentaries following the events of World War II, many of Haanstra's films contained poetic elements that "encourage viewers to see the mystery, wonder, or beauty of aspects of the historical world" by stressing the film's "mood, tone, and effect much more than displays of factual information or acts of rhetorical persuasion."

He directed several fiction films. Fanfare, a comedy situated in a small Dutch village, is still the Netherlands' second most popular film ever (measured at the box office), only surpassed by Paul Verhoevens Turkish Delight. Abroad however, Fanfare was hardly noticed, but it was entered into the 1959 Cannes Film Festival and the 1st Moscow International Film Festival.

After Fanfare, he continued his artistry in directing another short film called, Zoo. It was released on 14 December, 1962. A film which compared the behavior of animals and humans through his always appreciated humoristic fashion. As always, Haanstra continued to experiment with his cinematic techniques. In Zoo he experimented with hidden camera filming to capture he true nature of both man and beast. In 1963, Zoo was nominated for the BAFTA Film Award in Holland for Best Short Film.

In several shorts and in long documentaries like Alleman / The Human Dutch and Stem van het water / The Voice of the Water Haansta reflected on The Netherlands and its inhabitants. All these films made him one of the most popular filmmakers in the history of Dutch cinema. The documentary Alleman was seen in the cinema by 20 percent of the total Dutch population. In the seventies and eighties Haanstra addressed a new subject. He made several films about animals. In the long documentary Ape and Super-Ape (Bij de Beesten af) (1973), for which he collaborated with Frans de Waal and Jane Goodall, among others, he compared the behavior of animals and human beings. In total Haanstra received close to a hundred awards.

Haanstra was Officer in the Order of Orange-Nassau.

== Death ==
Haanstra died on 23 October 1997 at the age of 81 in a nursing home in Hilversum in the Netherlands. He died of Alzheimer's disease. After his death, the Oeuvre Award, a prestigious Dutch prize for film, (Haanstra had won one himself), was renamed the Bert Haanstra Oeuvre Award.

== Filmography ==
- De Muiderkring Herleeft (1948)
- Mirror of Holland (1950)
- Nederlandse Beeldhouwkunst tijdens de late Middeleeuwen (1951)
- Panta Rhei (1952)
- Dijkbouw (1952)
- Ontstaan en Vergaan (1954)
- De Opsporing van Aardolie (1954)
- De Verkenningsboring (1954)
- The Rival World (1955)
- En de zee was niet meer (1955)
- God Shiva (1955)
- Rembrandt, schilder van de mens (1957)
- Over glas gesproken (1958)
- Glass (1958)
- Fanfare (1958)
- The Manneken Pis Case (1960)
- Delta Phase I (1962)
- Zoo (1962)
- Lewis Mumford on the City, Part 2: The City - Cars or People? (1963)
- The Human Dutch (1963)
- The Voice of the Water (1966)
- Evoluon (1967)
- Return Ticket to Madrid (1967)
- Ape and Super-Ape (1972)
- When the Poppies Bloom Again (1975)
- Nationale Parken... Noodzaak (1978)
- Mr. Slotter's Jubilee (1979)
- Nederland (1983)
- Vroeger kon je lachen (1983)
- The Family of Chimps (1984)
- Kinderen van Ghana (1988)
