= Stienette Bosklopper =

Dutch film producer (born 1961)

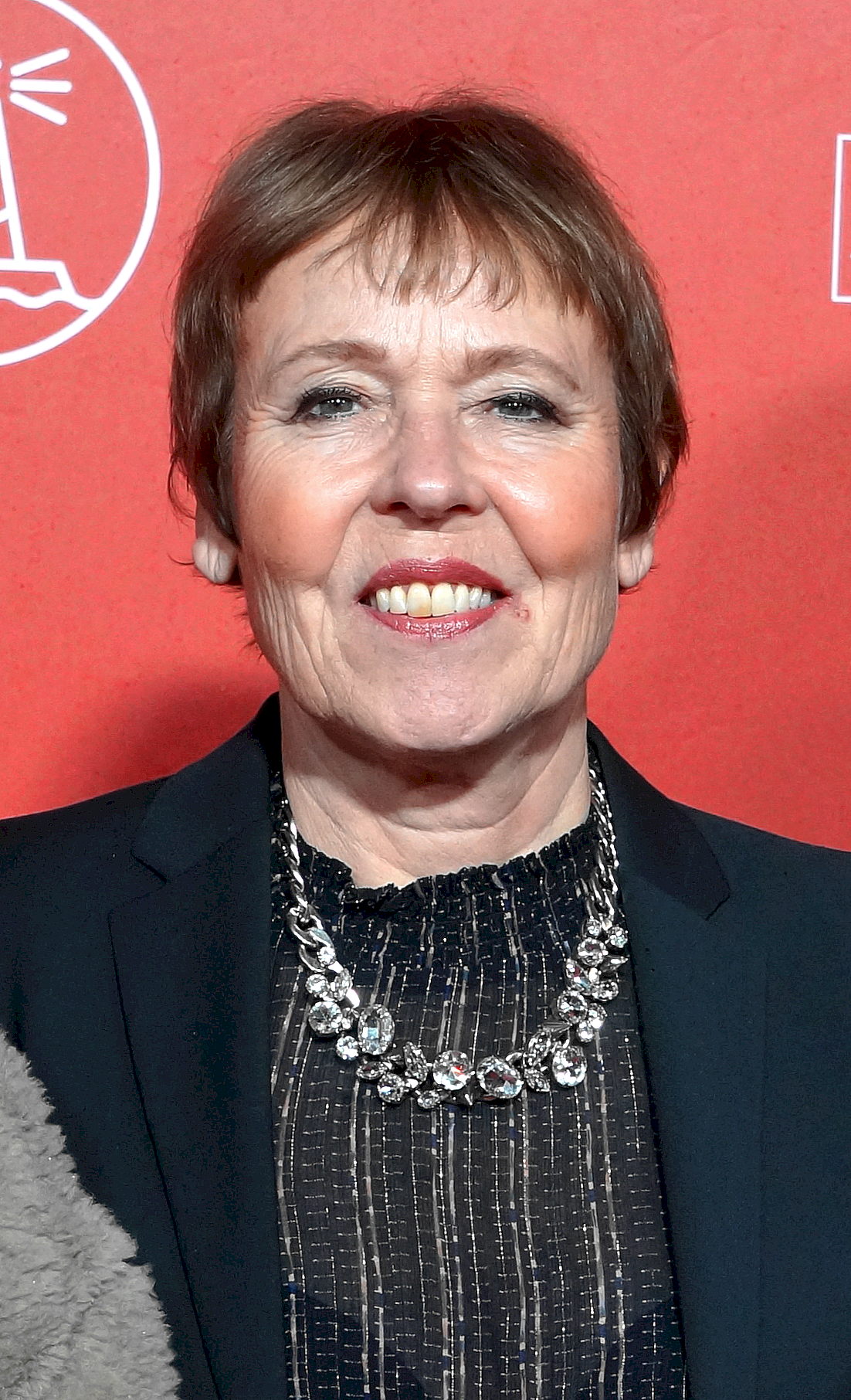
- Born: December 29, 1961 (age 64); Ter Apel
- Citizenship: Dutch
- Occupation: Film producer
- Known for: Wander to Wonder

Stienette Bosklopper is a Dutch, Oscar-nominated film producer and screenwriter based in Amsterdam. She is mostly known for producing Nanouk Leopold's films, including the award-winning film Cobain (2018), and for producing the Academy Award and BAFTA-nominated short film Wander to Wonder (2023). Bosklopper is the CEO of Dutch production company Circe Films, which has been producing feature films for the national and international market since 1996.

== Career ==
Bosklopper studied History between 1981 and 1985 at the University of Groningen. In 1985, she began working at the Dutch studio Nieuwe Gronden, as the assistant to film producer René Scholten. In 1990, Bosklopper joined Circe Films, a collective of young female filmmakers whose primary focus was creating television series for young audiences. From 1996 onwards, she became the owner of Circe Films and began working solely on feature films.

Between 2001 and 2006, she served as chair of the Netherlands Association of Feature Film Producers (NVS).

In 2008, Bosklopper co-authored a book titled The Film Producer: A Practical Handbook (2008) with Carolien Croon.

== Filmography ==
=== Film ===
- 1987: De schoorsteenveger (short film) - first assistant director. Directed by Ron Termaat.
- 1995: Aletta Jacobs, het hoogste streven (feature film) - producer. Directed by Nouchka van Brakel.
- 1997: Poldermol (short film) - producer. Directed by Erik de Goederen.
- 1998: De man met de hond (feature film) - producer. Directed by Annette Apon.
- 2001: Îles flottantes (feature film) - producer. Directed by Nanouk Leopold.
- 2002: Nachtbijter (short film) - producer. Directed by Chris W. Mitchell.
- 2003: The Rules of Flying (short film) - producer. Directed by Eugenie Jansen.
- 2005: Guernsey (feature film) - producer. Directed by Nanouk Leopold.
- 2005: Dialoogoefening (short film) - producer. Directed by Esther Rots.
- 2005: Ruta del jaca (feature film) - producer. Directed by Kris Kristinsson.
- 2007: Wolfsbergen (feature film) - producer. Directed by Nanouk Leopold.
- 2008: Nowhere Man (feature film) - co-producer. Directed by Patrice Toye.
- 2008: Calimucho (feature film) - producer. Directed by Eugenie Jansen.
- 2009: The Happiest Girl in the World (feature film) - co-producer. Directed by Radu Jude.
- 2009: Face (feature film) - co-producer. Directed by Tsai Ming-liang.
- 2010: Heavenly Life on Earth (feature film) - producer. Directed by Jesse de Jong.
- 2010: Brownian Movement (feature film) - producer. Directed by Nanouk Leopold.
- 2011: Our Grand Despair (feature film) - co-producer. Directed by Seyfi Teoman.
- 2012: Thursday Till Sunday (feature film) - co-producer. Directed by Dominga Sotomayor.
- 2012: Hemel (feature film) - producer. Directed by Sacha Polak.
- 2012: Everybody in Our Family (feature film) - co-producer. Directed by Radu Jude.
- 2013: It's All So Quiet (feature film) - producer. Directed by Nanouk Leopold.
- 2013: 82 Days in April (feature film) - co-producer. Directed by Bart Van den Bempt.
- 2013: A Long Story (feature film) - producer. Directed by Jorien van Nes.
- 2016: Waldstille (feature film) - producer. Directed by Martijn Maria Smits.
- 2016: Everything We Always Had Was Now (short film) - producer. Directed by Martijn Maria Smits.
- 2017: Rey (feature film) - co-producer. Directed by Niles Atallah.
- 2017: Do You Sometimes Feel Burned Out and Empty? (feature film) - co-producer. Directed by Lola Randl.
- 2018: Time Share (feature film) - co-producer. Directed by Sebastián Hofmann.
- 2018: Cobain (feature film) - writer, producer. Directed by Nanouk Leopold.
- 2018: Too Late to Die Young (feature film) - co-producer. Directed by Dominga Sotomayor.
- 2019: A Tale of Three Sisters (feature film) - co-producer. Directed by Emin Alper.
- 2019: A Certain Kind of Silence (feature film) - co-producer. Directed by Michal Hogenauer.
- 2022: Burning Days (feature film) - co-producer. Directed by Emin Alper.
- 2023: Beraber (feature film) - producer. Directed by Mete Gümürhan.
- 2023: Wander to Wonder (short film) - producer. Directed by Nina Gantz.
- 2024: Baby (feature film) - producer. Directed by Marcelo Caetano.
- 2024: Three Days of Fish (feature film) - producer. Directed by Peter Hoogendoorn.

=== Television ===
- 1993: Naarden Vesting (TV film) - producer. Directed by Annette Apon.
- 1996: Het is de Schraapzucht, gentlemen (TV film) - producer. Directed by Annette Apon.
- 2011: Days of Grass (TV film) - producer. Directed by Tomas Kaan.
- 2011: Nina Satana (TV film) - producer. Directed by Bram Schouw.
- 2012: Stockholm (TV film) - producer. Directed by Eché Janga.
- 2012: Cabo (TV film) - producer. Directed by Ivan Barbosa.
- 2013: Scooterdagen (TV film) - producer. Directed by Léonie de Boer.
- 2013: Roffa (TV film) - producer. Directed by Bobby Boermans.
- 2013: The Making of 'Boven is het Stil' (TV film) - producer. Directed by Sabine Lubbe Bakker and Niels van Koevorden.
- 2022: Good Bad Girl (TV film) - writer, producer. Directed by Mete Gümürhan.

== Recognition ==
Bosklopper's films have received numerous accolades, including a BAFTA and Academy Award nominations for the short film Wander to Wonder (2023), directed by Nina Gantz. The short has won 43 awards at international film festivals.

The feature film Cobain (2018) premiered at the 2018 Berlinale Film Festival and won several awards, including the Best Film Award at the 2018 Crossing Europe Film Festival and the Best Screenplay Awards at the 2018 Lecce European Film Festival.
