= White tail =

White tail or whitetail may refer to:

== Places ==
- Whitetail, Montana
- Whitetail Ski Resort

== Films ==
- Whitetail (film), a 2025 drama

== Animals ==
=== Mammals ===
- White-tailed deer
- White-tailed jackrabbit

=== Fish ===
- Centropyge flavicauda or whitetail angelfish, an angelfish from the Indo-pacific Ocean
- Whitetail dascyllus or white-tailed damselfish, a common aquarium fish
- Whitetail dogfish, a sleeper shark from the Indian Ocean
- Sufflamen albicaudatum or whitetail trigger, a triggerfish from the Indian Ocean

=== Birds ===
- White-tailed eagle
- White-tailed kite

=== Other animals ===
- Bothrops leucurus or whitetail lancehead, a Brazilian pit viper
- Two North American dragonflies in the genus Ladona:
  - Common whitetail
  - Desert whitetail
- White-tailed spider
