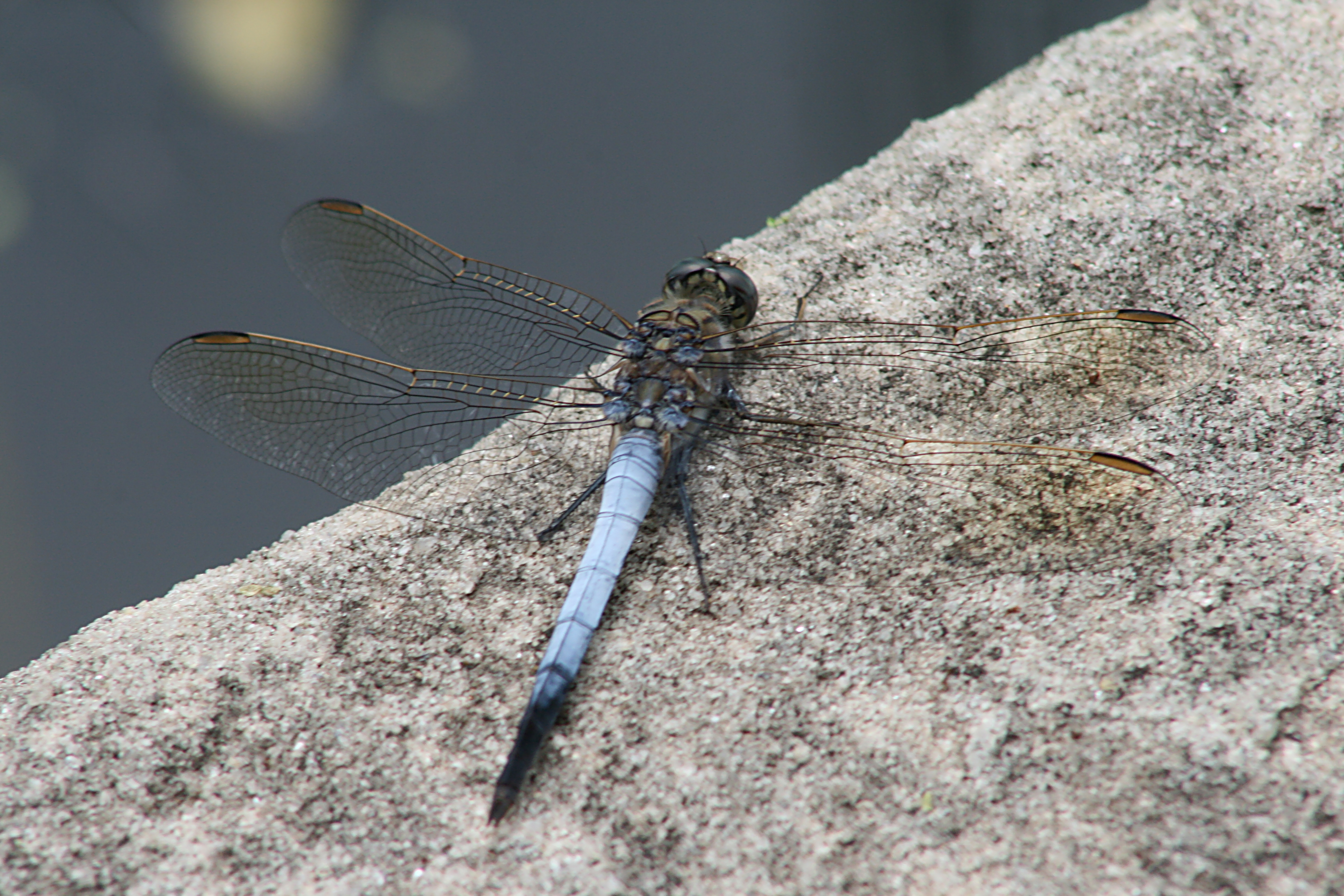
- Male
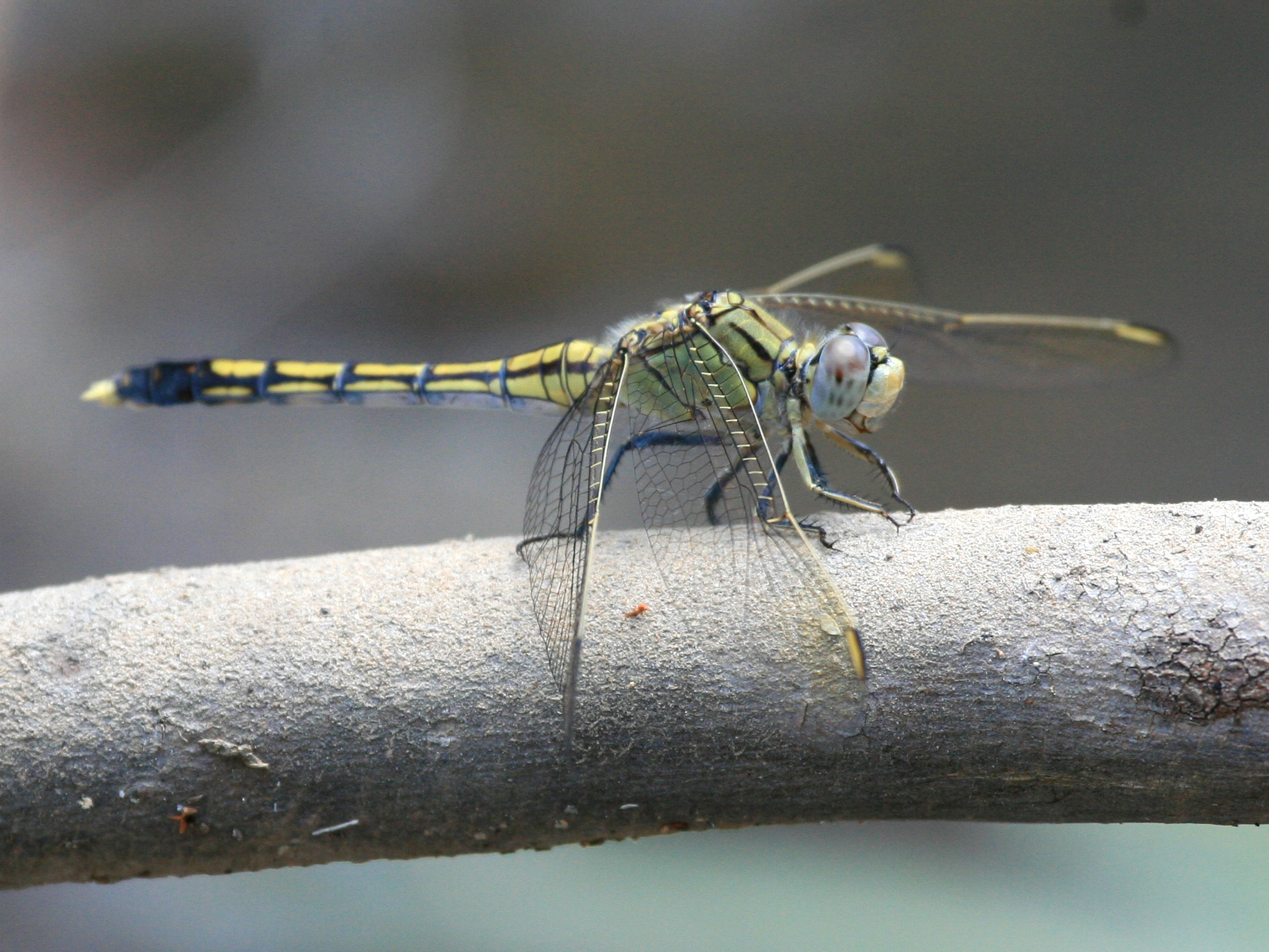
- Female

Conservation status
- Least Concern (IUCN 3.1)

Scientific classification
- Kingdom: Animalia
- Phylum: Arthropoda
- Clade: Pancrustacea
- Class: Insecta
- Order: Odonata
- Infraorder: Anisoptera
- Family: Libellulidae
- Genus: Orthetrum
- Species: O. caledonicum

Binomial name
- Orthetrum caledonicum (Brauer, 1865)

Synonyms
- Libellula caledonica Brauer, 1865

= Orthetrum caledonicum =

Blue skimmer

Species of dragonfly

Orthetrum caledonicum, the blue skimmer, is a common Australian dragonfly in the family Libellulidae.

Males have a powder blue thorax and abdomen pruinescent blue when mature. The females are brownish grey in colour while the teneral are yellow with black markings. They are medium in size, with a body length of 4.5 cm (2 in) and a wingspan of 7 cm (3 in).

The species is widespread throughout mainland Australia and extending to Tasmania. It is also found in New Guinea, New Caledonia, Loyalty Islands and Lesser Sunda Islands. It inhabits a range of still and flowing water habitats including temporary waters.

== Etymology ==
The genus name Orthetrum is derived from the Greek ὀρθός (orthos, "straight") and ἦτρον (ētron, "abdomen"), referring to the parallel-sided abdomen of the genus.

The species name caledonicum is named for New Caledonia, where the original specimens of the species were collected.

== Gallery ==
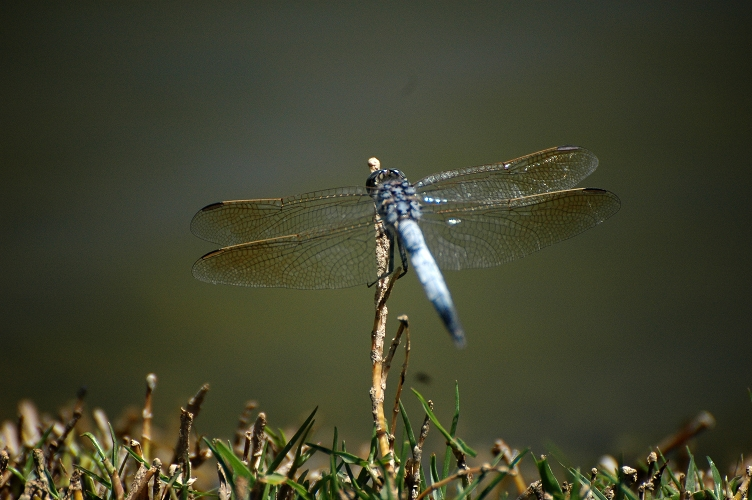
Adult in Margaret River, Western Australia

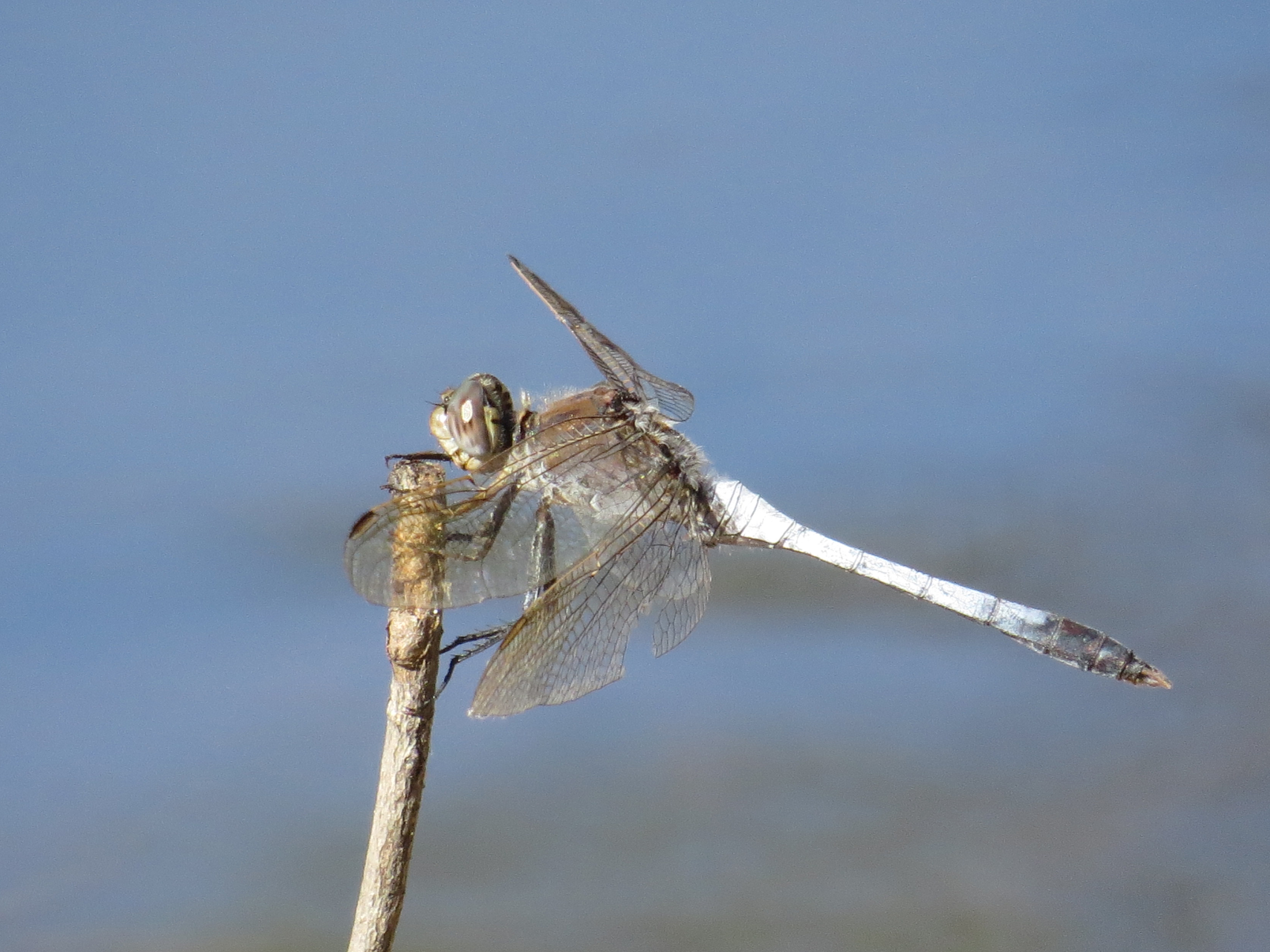
Male with hind wing damage viewed from the side

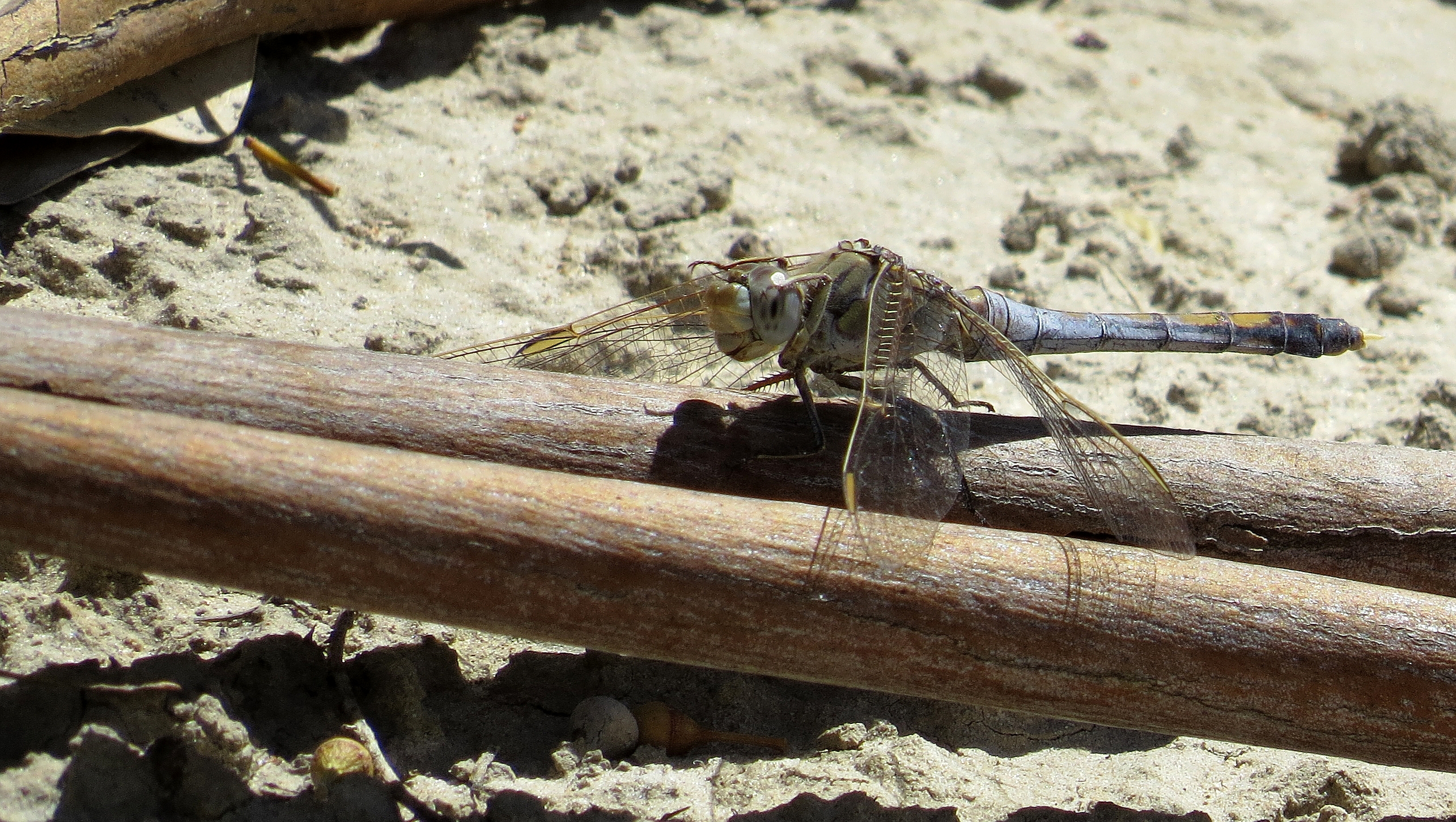
Female with some pale pruinescence on her tail

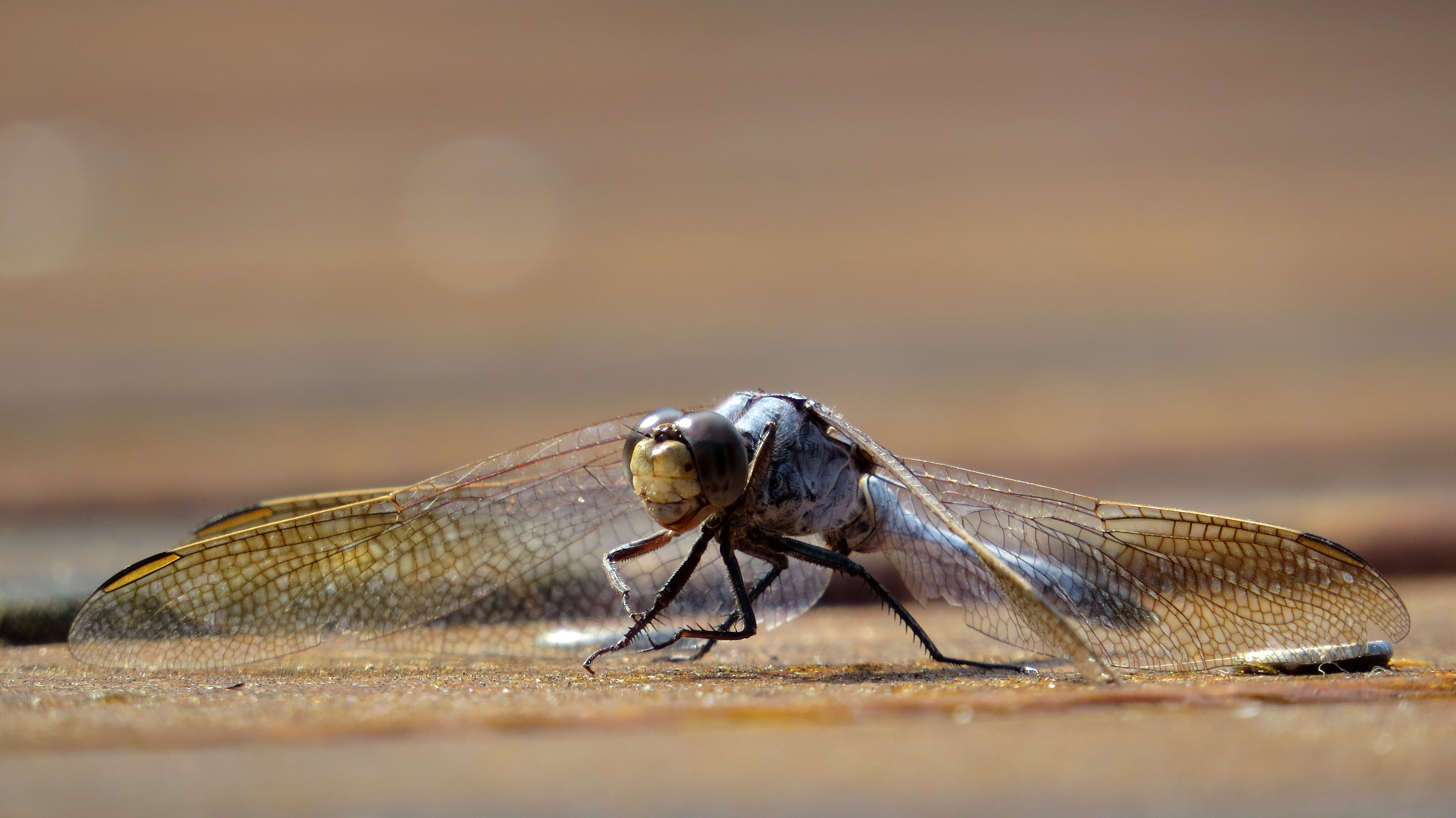
Face of male

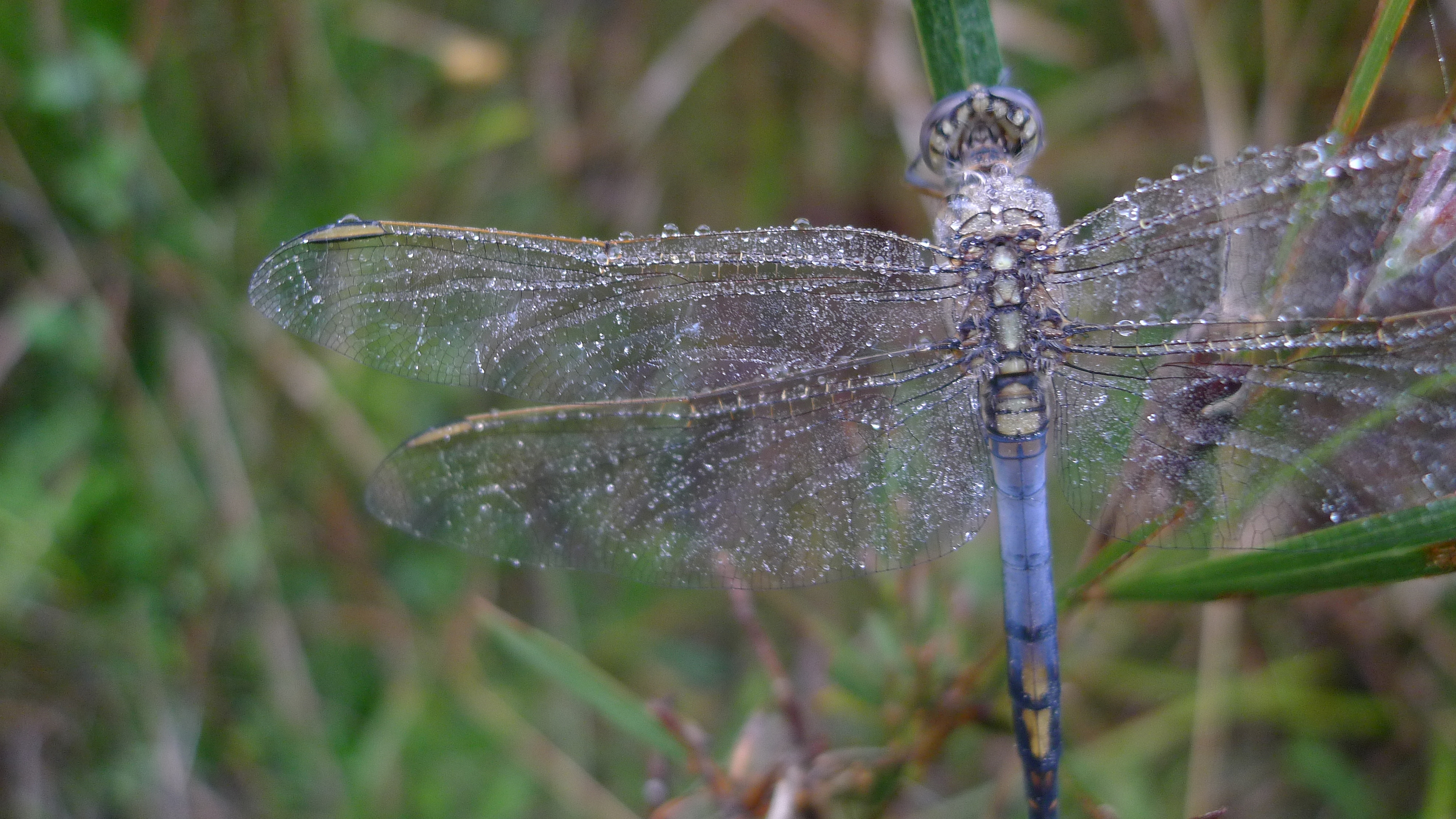
Covered in dew

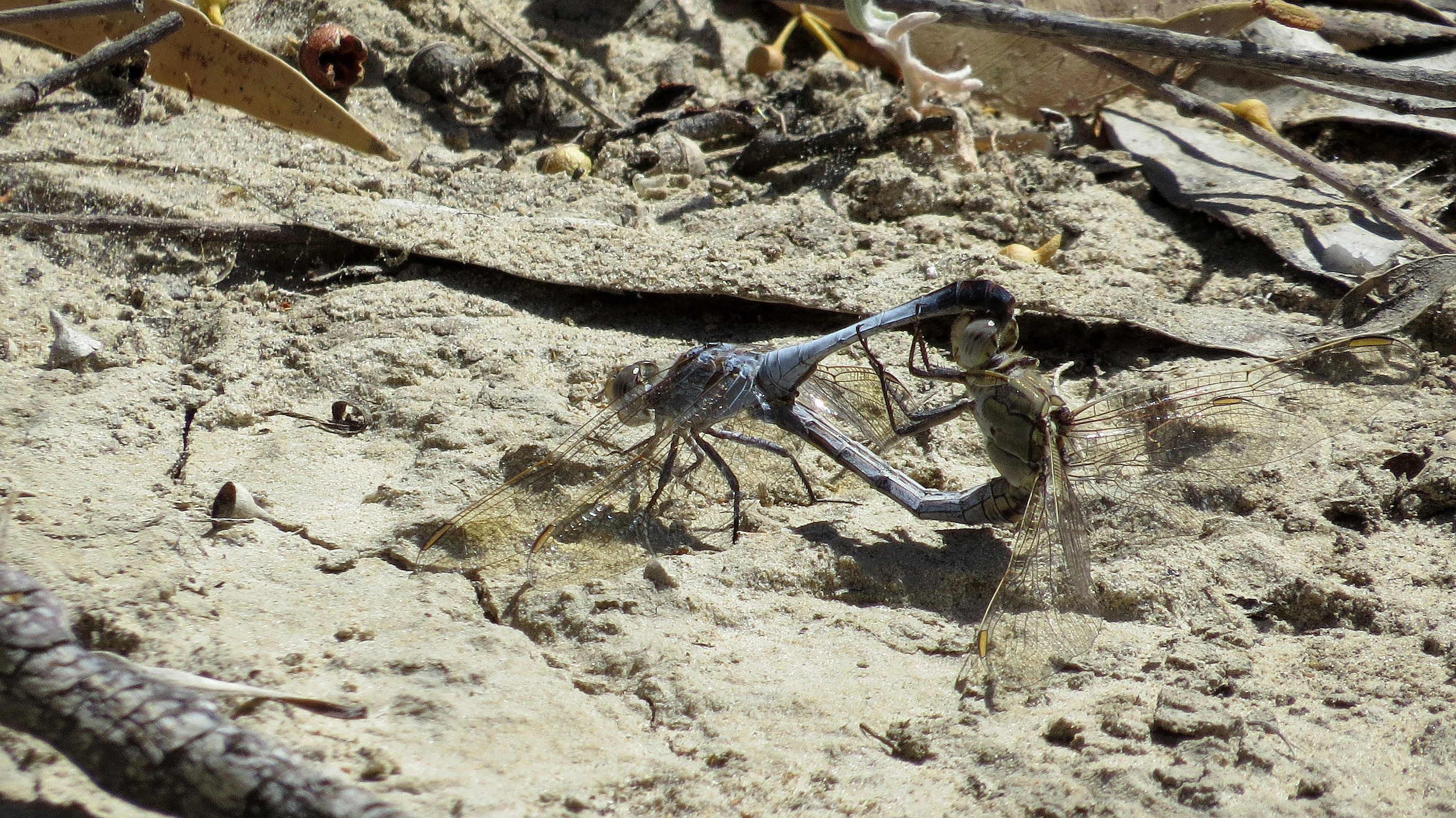
Mating pair, male is upright

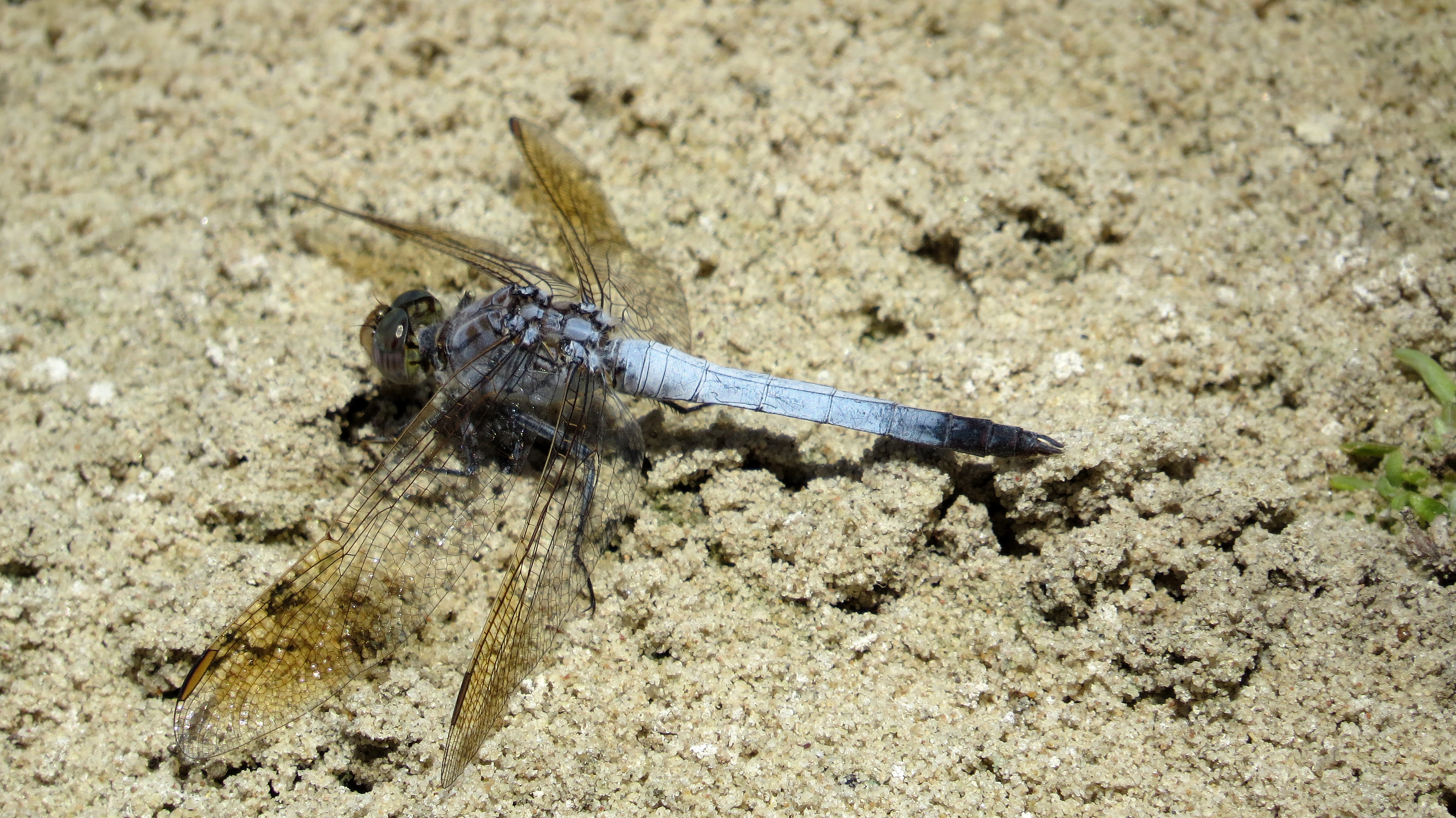
Male showing colouration near wingtips

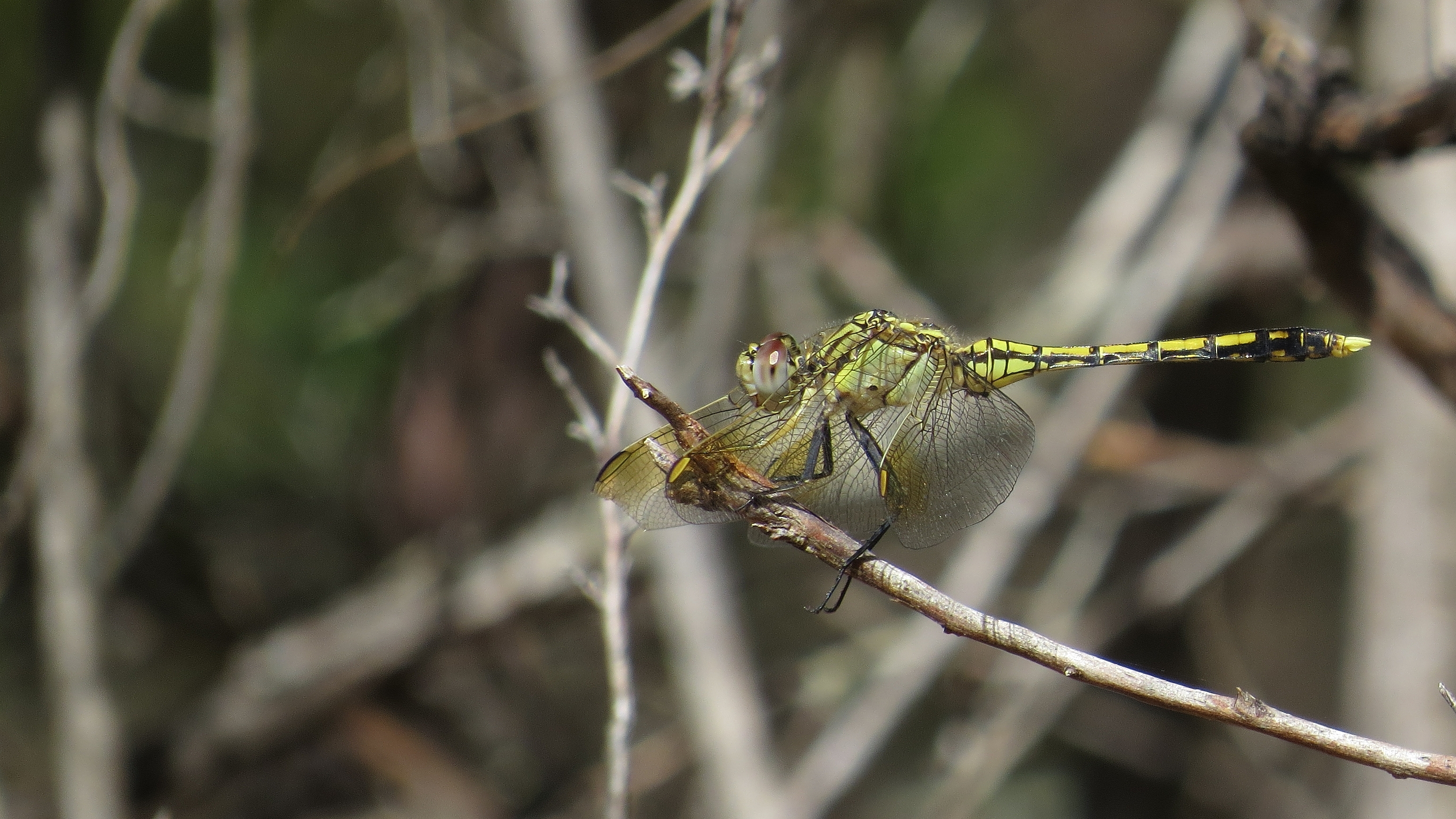
Young male before his tail turns blue

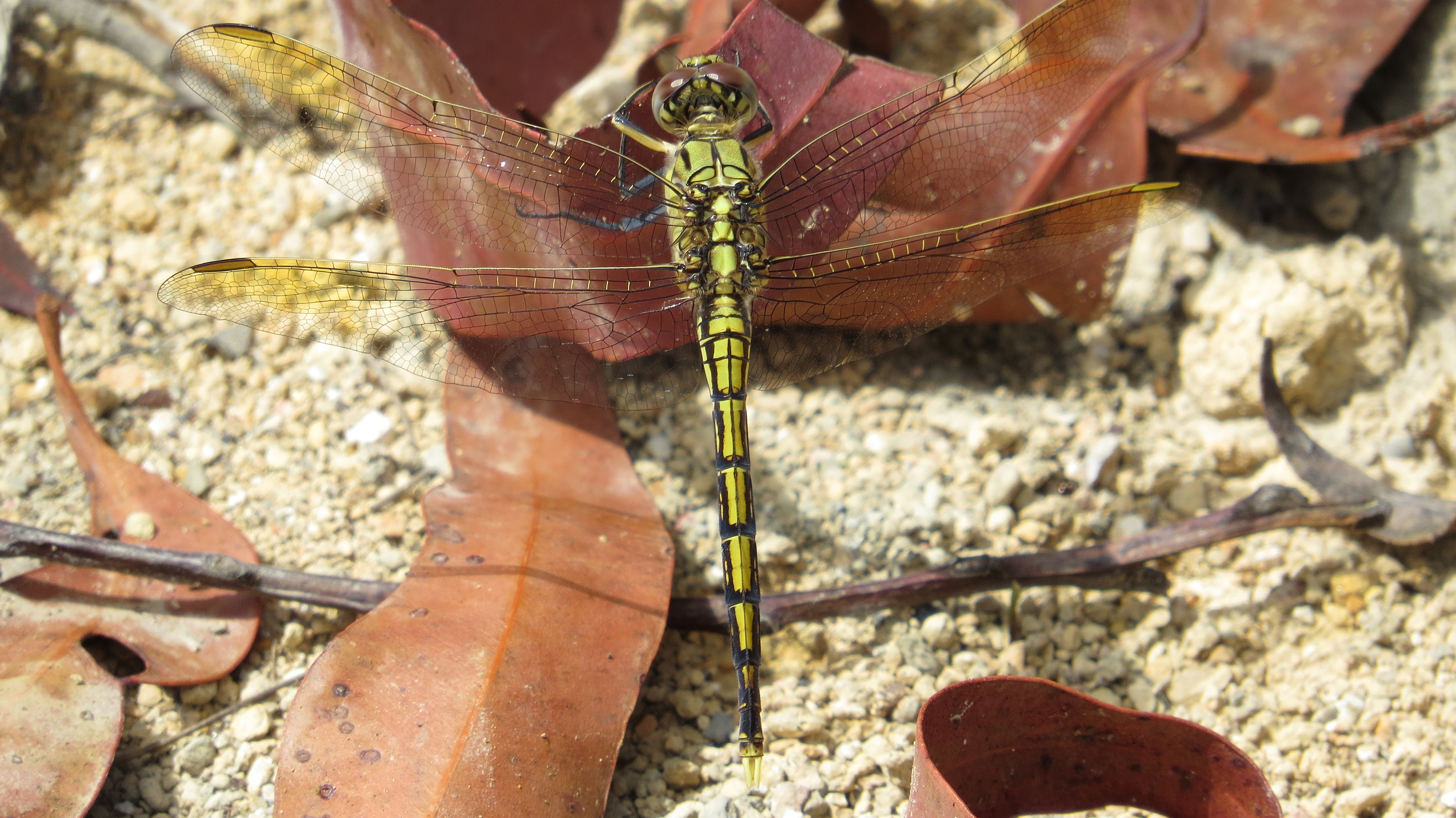
Young male showing his true colours

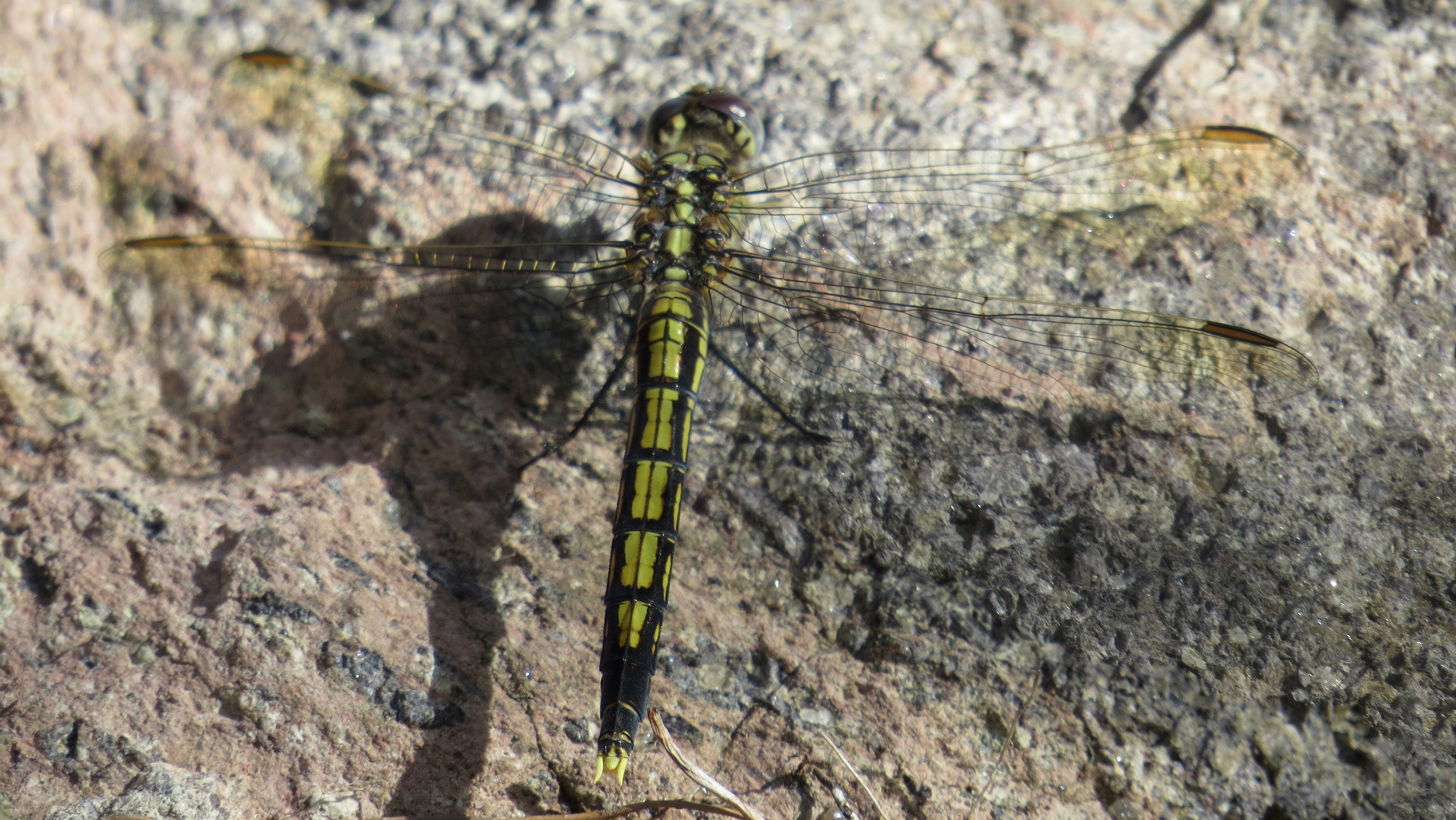
Female

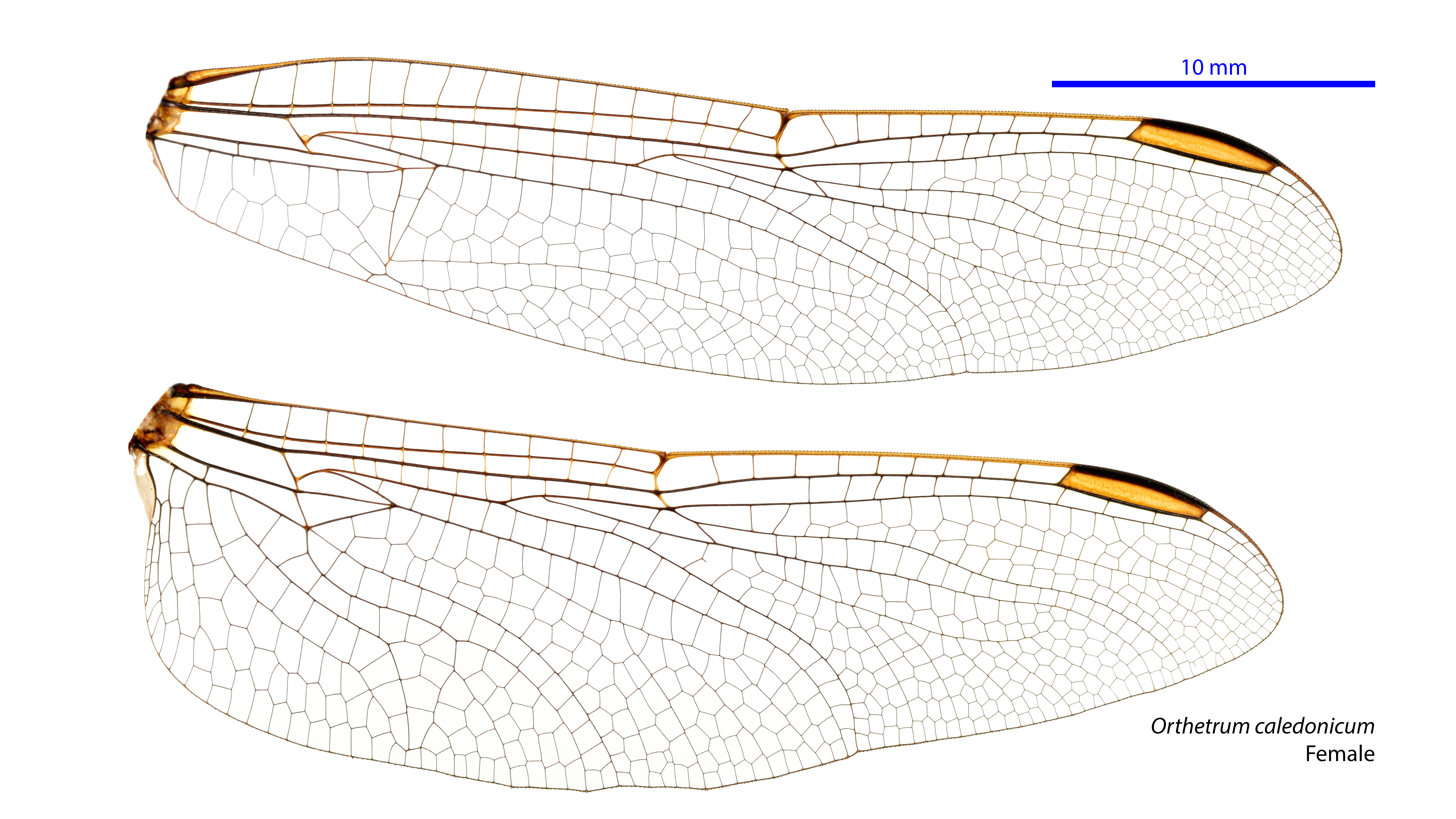
Photo of female wings

Illustration of wings of male
