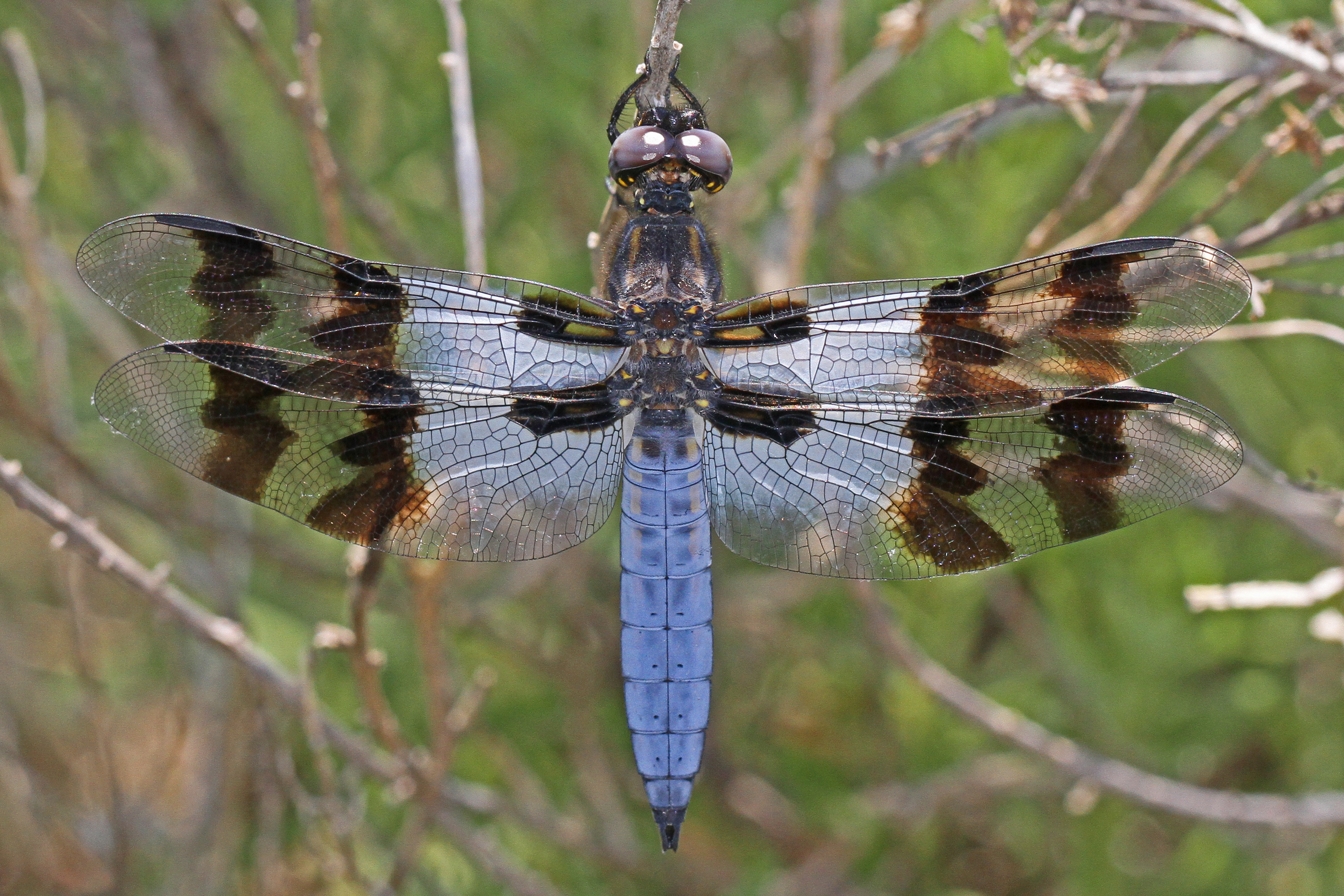

Conservation status
- Least Concern (IUCN 3.1)

Scientific classification
- Kingdom: Animalia
- Phylum: Arthropoda
- Clade: Pancrustacea
- Class: Insecta
- Order: Odonata
- Infraorder: Anisoptera
- Family: Libellulidae
- Genus: Plathemis
- Species: P. subornata

Binomial name
- Plathemis subornata (Hagen, 1861)

Synonyms
- Libellula subornata (Hagen, 1861)

= Desert whitetail =

Species of dragonfly

The desert whitetail (Plathemis subornata) is a species of dragonfly in the family Libellulidae. P. subornata is often put into the genus Libellula.

== Identification ==
=== Adult ===
The desert whitetail is a medium-sized dragonfly with length of 40 to 50 millimeters (1 5/8 to 2 in). It has a wingspan of 65 to 75 mm (2.6 to 3.0 in). This dragonfly has a broad abdomen. Mature males, females, and immature males of desert whitetails look different:

- Mature Male: Every wing of the desert whitetail is marked with a small, dark, elongated spot, possibly with a clear center, near the base, and with a large, dark band spanning the width of the wing, from the center to the outer fourth of the wing near the tip. Its bands are lighter in color down its center compared to its edges. The area between its base of the wing and this band may be clouded with white color. The thorax and below is pruinose-whitish blue.
- Female: Each wing of the female whitetail is marked with a small, dark, elongated spot with a clear center, near the base, and with a pair of thick, wavy, brownish bands spanning the width of the wing. The wingtip is sometimes clouded with yellow. The female thorax and abdomen are grayish brown. Every side of the thorax is marked with a pair of yellowish stripes, and at the top of the abdomen is marked with two parallel lines of thick yellow dashes.
- Immature male: The wings of immature males appear much like those of the mature males, while their bodies are marked like females.

=== Naiad ===
The naiad of the desert whitetail is medium-sized with a length of 21 to 25 mm (0.83 to 0.98 in). Its abdomen is rounded, giving it a short, stocky appearance known as the sprawler form. There is a single, blunt hook on the tops of abdominal segments two through six, the tallest occurs on segment four. There is also a single, rear-facing spine on each side of abdominal segments eight and nine.

== Distribution ==
The desert whitetail is found in Arizona, California, Colorado, Delaware, Kansas, New Mexico, Oregon, Texas, U.S. Virgin Islands, and Washington. It also can be found in Mexico.

== Habitat ==
This dragonfly species can be found near ponds, lakes, and seepage pools in desert areas. In California, the desert whitetail can be found in all its deserts.

== Flight season ==
Desert whitetails fly generally from early July to early September. This whitetail also has a flight season from April to October.

== Diet ==
=== Adult ===
The desert whitetail will eat almost any soft-bodied flying insect such as mosquitoes, flies, butterflies, moths, mayflies, and flying ants or termites.

=== Naiad ===
The naiad of the desert whitetail feeds on many aquatic insects, including mosquito larvae, other aquatic fly larvae, mayfly larvae, and freshwater shrimp. It also eats small fish and tadpoles.

== Ecology ==
Desert whitetail naiads live in submerged aquatic grasses and sedges. They do not actively chase after their prey but wait for it to pass by, a strategy which affords them protection from other predators. These naiads will emerge as adults at night. Adults generally fly from summer to fall. They sometimes fly from spring to winter. The desert whitetail perches on twigs and rocks. This is where the hunting occurs.

== Reproduction ==
The male will establish and defend territories at their choice breeding locations. After both genders mate, the female flies singly, without the male attached, to lay her eggs. She does this process by dipping the tip of her abdomen in the shallows of desert seeps and ponds while hovering above the surface of water.

== Similar species ==
This species is related to the common whitetail which is the other species in the genus Plathemis. This genus includes two species. The desert whitetail looks similar to the common whitetail which has much less white on the wing.

== Conservation ==
According to the International Union for Conservation of Nature's (IUCN) 2016 assessment, the desert whitetail is at "least concern" for extinction. Its population trend is not known, but is believed to be stable.
