= Catachlorops rufescens =

Scientific classification
- Kingdom: Animalia
- Phylum: Arthropoda
- Class: Insecta
- Order: Diptera
- Family: Tabanidae
- Genus: Catachlorops
- Species: C. rufescens

Binomial name
- Catachlorops rufescens (Fabricius, 1805)

Species of insect

Catachlorops rufescens is a species of biting horse-fly in the family Tabanidae.

== Taxonomy ==
Catachlorops rufescens was described by Johan Christian Fabricius in 1805.

== Description ==
The adult body size of C. rufescens averages around 11 mm (0.43 in), while the wing length averages around 10 mm (0.39 in). The eyes are a solid green in color. The overall body coloration is mostly dark brown to black, including the legs. On the thorax, the postpronotal lobe is yellow, its setae yellow as well; Scutum is a reddish brown with notably dense gray pruinescence in the anterior region; the scutellum is light gray. C. rufescens has a broad dark brown abdomen with white setae on tergites I-IV in the middle. On the wings there is a dark circle-like pigmentation going from the pterostigma to cell r5, down to the middle of m3. The costal margin of the wings have slight pigmentation, while the rest of the wings are hyaline for the most part.

== Distribution and habitat ==
Catachlorops rufescens is endemic to the tropical lowland region of the Amazon rainforest and can be found Guyana, French Guiana, and northern parts of Brazil. Larvae can be found in freshwater watercourses, such as streams, around underwater roots.
