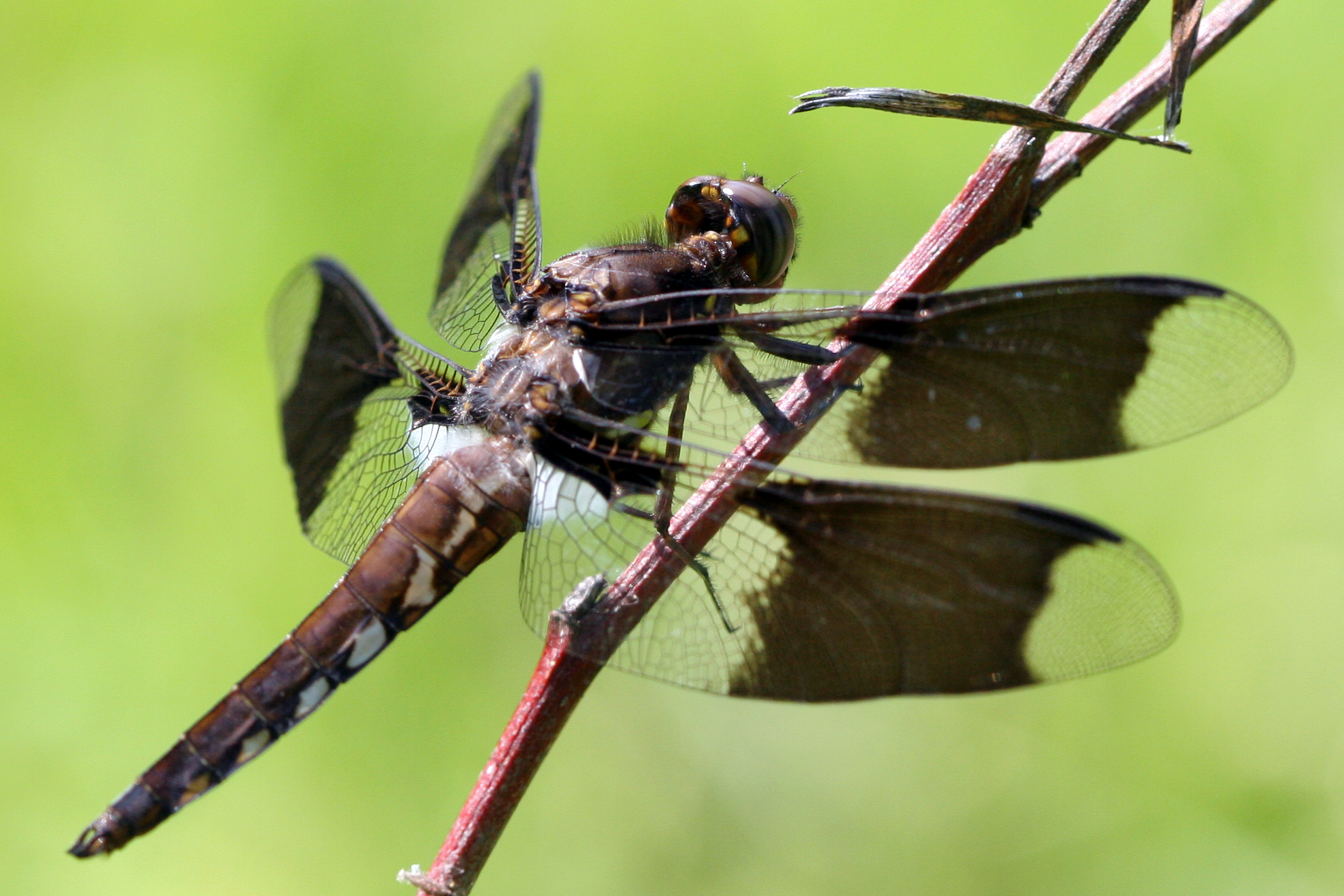
- Immature male common whitetail (Plathemis lydia)

Scientific classification
- Kingdom: Animalia
- Phylum: Arthropoda
- Clade: Pancrustacea
- Class: Insecta
- Order: Odonata
- Infraorder: Anisoptera
- Family: Libellulidae
- Genus: Plathemis; Hagen, 1861

= Plathemis =

Genus of dragonflies

Plathemis is a small genus of dragonflies in the family Libellulidae. It has been considered a synonym of Libellula, subgenus, or separate genus by different authorities. Phylogenetic analysis has supported its status as either a subgenus or a full genus.

== Species ==
It contains two species:

Male	Female	Scientific name	Common name	Distribution
		Plathemis lydia (Drury, 1770)	common whitetail or long-tailed skimmer	North America
		Plathemis subornata (Hagen, 1861)	desert whitetail	United States (Arizona, California, Colorado, Delaware, Kansas, New Mexico, Oregon, Texas, U.S. Virgin Islands, and Washington.), Mexico
