= Whitetail (film) =

2025 drama film

- Poster for the film
- Directed by: Nanouk Leopold
- Written by: Nanouk Leopold
- Produced by: Stienette Bosklopper; Maarten Swart
- Starring: Natasha O'Keeffe; Andrew Bennett; Aaron McCusker; Rory Nolan; Aidan O'Hare
- Cinematography: Frank van den Eeden
- Edited by: Katharina Wartena
- Music by: Stephen Rennicks
- Release dates: 5 September 2025 (Toronto); 2026 (Netherlands)
- Running time: 103 minutes
- Countries: Netherlands; Belgium; Ireland
- Language: English

Whitetail is a 2025 drama film directed by Nanouk Leopold starring Natasha O’Keeffe. The film premiered at the 2025 Toronto International Film Festival. Set in the southern Irish countryside, the film follows a woman as she grapples with a past tragic trauma.

== Plot ==
As teenagers, Jen and Oscar share a tragic accident in the forests of southern Ireland when they accidentally shoot and kill Jen's sister, Erica, who they mistake for a deer. Decades later, Jen works as a forest ranger in those same woods, having repressed her emotions about the tragedy while Oscar has moved away from their small town. When Oscar returns after the death of his mother, Jen loses her fragile emotional balance as she works to combat a poacher who threatens the ecological balance she has worked to return to the forest.

== Cast ==
- Natasha O'Keeffe as Jen
- Abby Fitz as Teenage Jen
- Aaron McCusker as Oscar
- Seán Treacy Teenage Oscar
- Andrew Bennett as Daniel, Jen's father
- Rory Nolan as Bobby
- Aidan O'Hare as Liam

== Production ==
The film was written and directed by Dutch director Nanouk Leopold. It is her seventh film and first fiction film since Cobain (2018). The film is a European co-production between the Netherlands, Belgium, and Ireland. Filming took place in County Kerry and County Cork. The creative team included cinematographer Frank van den Eeden, production designer Emma Lowney, and composer Stephen Rennicks.

== Release and reception ==
The film premiered at the 2025 Toronto International Film Festival and was released in the Netherlands in 2026 at the International Film Festival Rotterdam. As of March 2026 it has a 90% rating on rotten tomatoes based on 10 reviews.
