= Wander to Wonder =

2023 Dutch-Belgian-French-English animated short film

Wander To Wonder
- Directed by: Nina Gantz
- Written by: Nina Gantz
- Produced by: Stienette Bosklopper; Nina Gantz; Ben Tesseur; Maarten Swart; Annemie Degryse; Steven De Beul
- Starring: Neil Salvage; Toby Jones; Amanda Lawrence; Terence Dunn
- Music by: Terence Dunn
- Distributed by: Miyu Distribution
- Release date: 2023
- Running time: 14 minutes
- Countries: Netherlands; Belgium; France; United Kingdom
- Language: English

Wander to Wonder is a 2023 animated short film, written and directed by Nina Gantz. The film was nominated for Best Animated Short Film at the Academy Awards and won the BAFTA award for Best British Short Animation.

Wander to Wonder is available to watch fully on Gantz's official Vimeo channel.

== Plot ==
Mary, Billybud, and Fumbleton are tiny humans who starred in the 1980s children's TV series called Wander to Wonder, where they dressed up as silly creatures and were guided by the creator and host, Uncle Gilly, whose house doubles as the studio where the show was made. In the present, however, Uncle Gilly has been dead for an indeterminate amount of time, his corpse rotting inside his house. The actors have been struggling to survive and find a sense of normalcy. Mary, deeply mourning Uncle Gilly and in denial that their lives have changed, continues to record material in front of the camera, rewatches Wander to Wonder episodes on VHS, and reads old fan letters. Fumbleton entertains himself by quoting Shakespeare while half-dressed or looking outside, and the mute, spacey Billybud repeatedly juggles leftover props.

The actors run out of food and get sick from eating the flies that have been feasting on Uncle Gilly's corpse. As Fumbleton and Mary argue about their future, Billybud accidentally sets the house on fire while juggling lit matches. The stars survive the fire by hiding in the oven, and in the morning, they exit to find the house completely burned down and the camera destroyed. A hole in the wall lets in a pigeon which frightens Mary and Billybud, but Fumbleton stabs the bird with a makeshift spear. The three stars feel the breeze from outdoors and look hopefully into the sunlight, finally accepting the new chapter of their lives.

== Cast ==
- Neil Salvage as Uncle Gilly, the deceased creator and host of Wander to Wonder
- Amanda Lawrence as the voice of Mary
- Terence Dunn as the voice of Billybud
- Toby Jones as the voice of Fumbleton

== Production ==
The 14-minute stop motion film about different ways of grieving took eight years to complete and was a co-production between four countries: France, Belgium, United Kingdom and the Netherlands.

== Accolades ==
Wander to Wonder has been selected in various international film festivals, including Anima Brussels Festival and the Venice Film Festival, where it premiered and won the Best International Short Award. The film also received the Best British Short Film Award at the 2024 British Independent Film Awards.

Year	Festival	Award/Category	Status
2023	Venice Film Festival	Best International Short	Nominated
2024	Brussels International Animation Film Festival	Best International Short Film	Won
2024	Tampere Film Festival	International Competition Grand Prix	Won
2024	New Chitose Airport International Animation Festival	International Competition	Nominated
2024	Hollyshorts	Best Short Animation	Won
2025	Annie Awards	Best Short Subject	Won
2025	British Academy Film Awards	Best British Short Animation	Won
2025	Academy Awards	Best Animated Short Film	Nominated
