= Annemarie Prins =

Dutch actress (1932–2026)

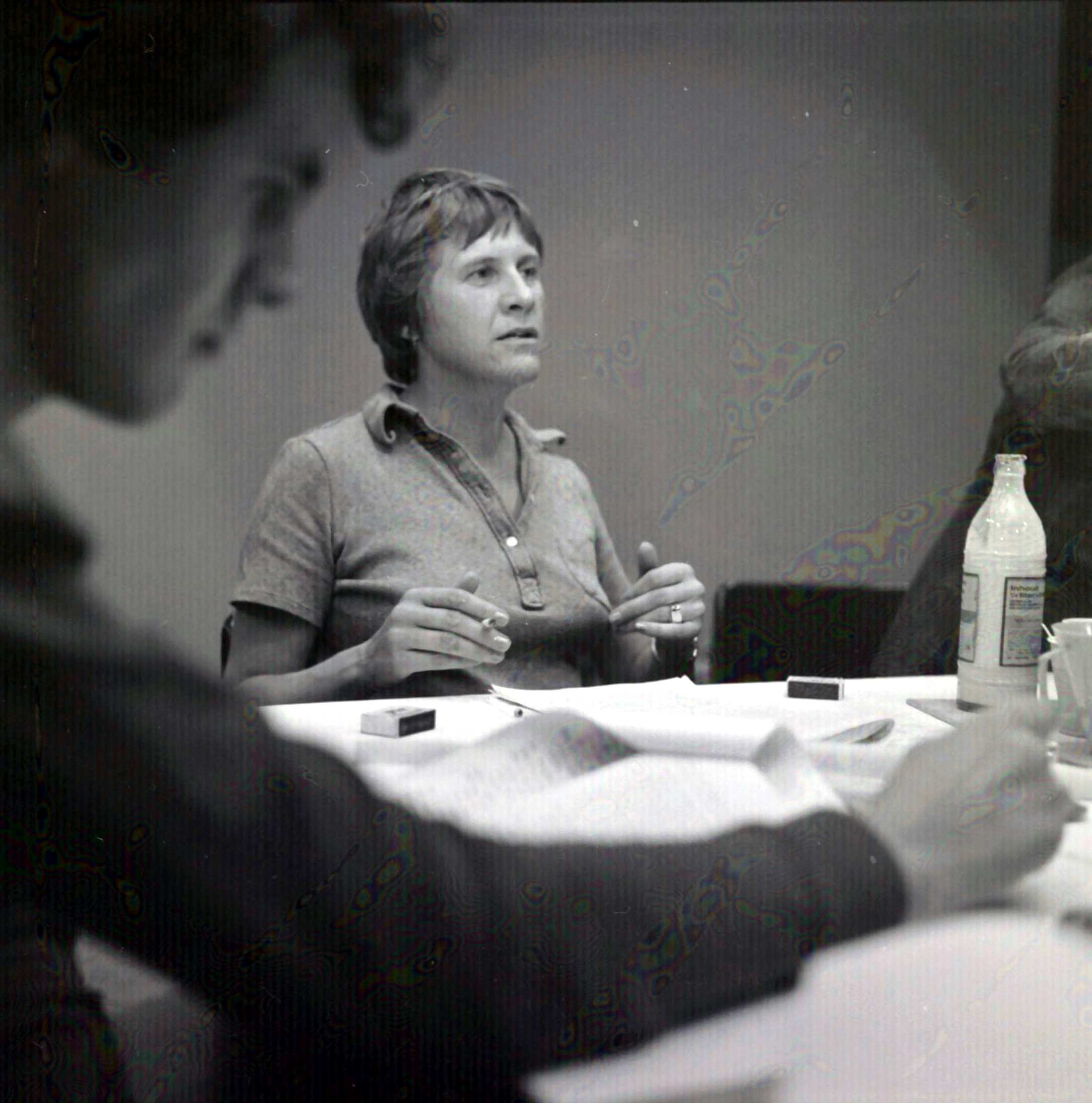
- Prins in 1973
- Born: Annemarie Margaretha Prins; 26 November 1932; Amsterdam, Netherlands
- Died: 13 January 2026 (aged 93); Amsterdam, Netherlands
- Education: ArtEZ University of the Arts
- Occupation: Actress

Annemarie Magaretha Prins (26 November 1932 – 13 January 2026) was a Dutch actress.

Prins graduated from drama school in Arnhem. She appeared on both film and the stage, writing plays on political themes such as authoritarianism and the Vietnam War.

Prins died in Amsterdam on 13 January 2026, at the age of 93.

== Filmography ==
=== Film ===
- Îles flottantes (2001)
- Code Blue (2011)
- Accused (2014)
- Memory Lane (2024)

=== Television ===
- Oud Geld (1998)
- Wij, Alexander (1998)
