= Îles flottantes =

- Theatrical release poster
- Directed by: Nanouk Leopold
- Written by: Nanouk Leopold
- Produced by: Stienette Bosklopper
- Starring: Maria Kraakman; Manja Topper; Halina Reijn; Leo Hogenboom; Gillis Biesheuvel
- Cinematography: Benito Strangio
- Edited by: Katharina Wartena
- Music by: Harry de Wit
- Production companies: Circe Films; Motel Films; VPRO
- Distributed by: A-Film Distribution
- Release date: 12 April 2001
- Running time: 78 minutes
- Country: Netherlands
- Languages: Dutch; Russian

Îles flottantes (English: Floating Islands) is a 2001 Dutch tragicomedy film written for the screen and directed by Nanouk Leopold, in her directorial debut, produced by Stienette Bosklopper. It stars Maria Kraakman, Manja Topper, Halina Reijn, Leo Hogenboom and Gillis Biesheuvel, and it follows the dysfunctional lives of three best friends who all just turned thirty and struggle with giving meaning to their lives. The film is a stand-alone sequel to Leopold's graduation film, Weekend (1998).

Îles flottantes was made as part of the No More Heroes, an initiative created by Motel Films and the VPRO for upcoming filmmakers to create low-budget feature films in collaboration with the Netherlands Film Fund. The film was first shown at 2001's International Film Festival Rotterdam, where it competed for the Tiger Award.

== Cast ==
- Maria Kraakman as Kaat
- Manja Topper as Sacha
- Halina Reijn as Isa
- Leo Hogenboom as ARBO-man
- Gillis Biesheuvel as Boris
- Jacob Derwig as Peer
- Leopold Witte as Max
- Annemarie Prins as Grandmother
- Aat Geelen as Gijs

== Production ==
Nanouk Leopold during her last year of her studies realized she wanted to revisit the characters from her 1998's graduation film, Weekend, and was approached by Circe Films and producer Stienette Bosklopper shortly after her graduation. Under the project's working title ‘Meisjes van dertig’ (girls from thirty), she was contacted by Motel Films and VPRO for their No More Heroes project, an initiative for upcoming filmmakers to fund and create low-budget feature films with funding by the Netherlands Film Fund. It was partially filmed in and around the street Leopold grew up in.

== Release ==
Îles flottantes had its world premiere at the 2001's International Film Festival Rotterdam, where it competed for the Tiger Award.

== Reception ==
The film was received mostly positive by critics although they found the film fairly hermetic.
