= Nina Gantz =

Dutch animation film director (born 1987)

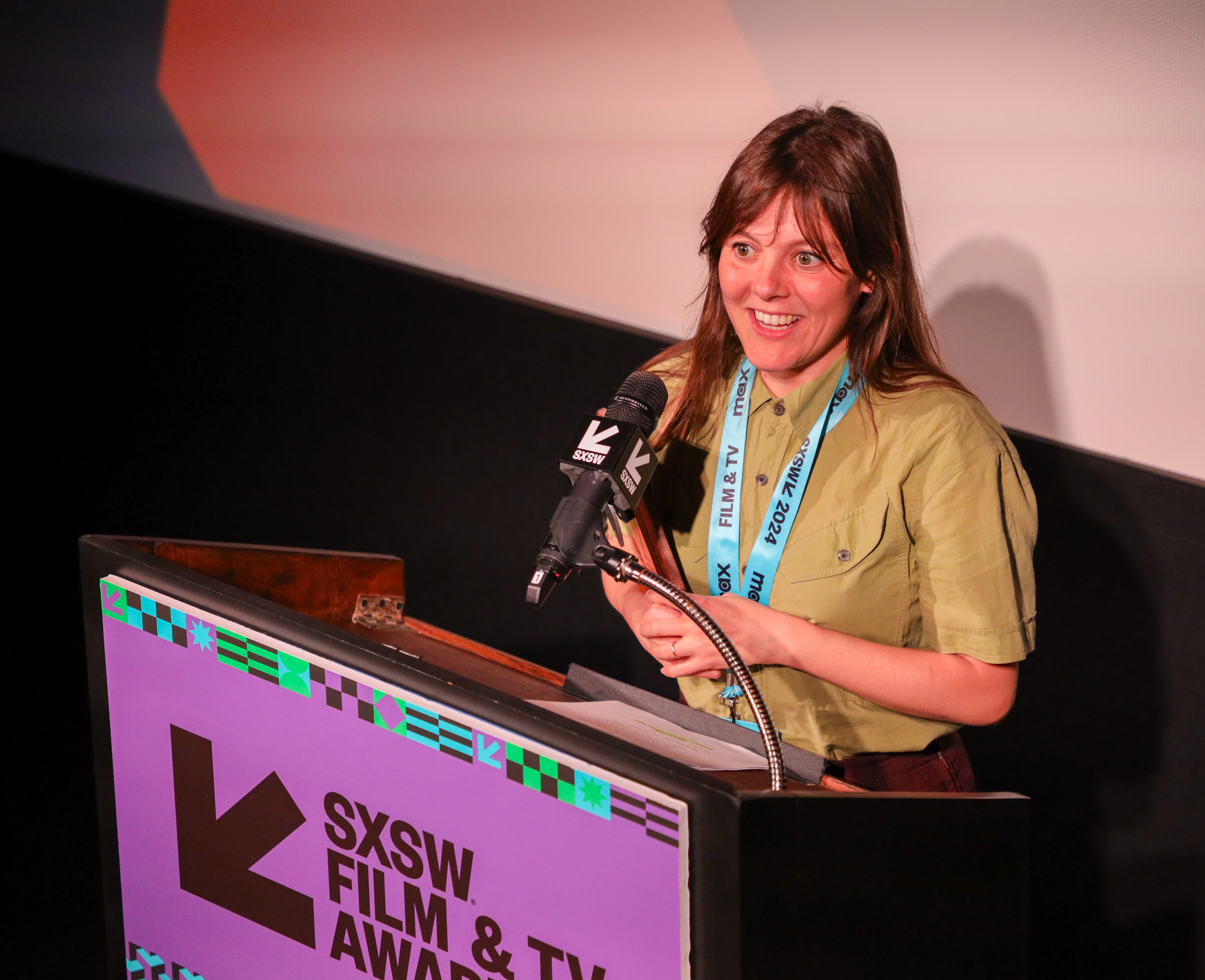
- SXSW 2024 Film Awards - Nina Gantz.
- Born: 26 May 1987 (age 39); Amsterdam
- Occupations: Director, Animator
- Years active: 2010–present
- Spouse: Terence Dunn (composer)

Nina Gantz is a Dutch animation film director and daughter of the Dutch actress Loes Luca. She is best known for her animated short film Edmond, which won the Best Animated Short Film Award at the Sundance Film Festival and a BAFTA Award in 2016 and her animated short film Wander to Wonder (2023), which won a BAFTA Award and was nominated for the Academy Award for Best Animated Short Film.

== Career ==
In 2010, Gantz graduated from the Akademie voor Kunst en Vormgeving St. Joost in Breda with the short animation film Zaliger (2010), which won a Golden Panda Award at the Sichuan TV Festival in Sichuan.

In 2015 she graduated with a Master's in Directing Animation from the National Film and Television School, with her film Edmond, a BAFTA-winning stop motion short film. After graduating, Gantz worked on a variety of projects as a freelance animator and director. She also works on commercials as a director for the London-based production company BlinkInk.

In January 2025, Gantz received her second BAFTA nomination and her first Academy Award nomination with her film Wander to Wonder (2023). The film is her first independent work as a director since graduating from the NFTS.

== Filmography ==
- Zaliger (2010) (short film) - director, writer, producer, animator.
- Edmond (2015) (short film) - director, writer, lead animator.
- Wander to Wonder (2023) (short film) - director, producer, writer, character designer.
