= Cobain (film) =

2018 film

- Film poster
- Directed by: Nanouk Leopold
- Written by: Stienette Bosklopper
- Starring: Bas Keizer
- Release dates: 17 February 2018 (Berlin); 5 April 2018 (Netherlands)
- Running time: 94 minutes
- Country: Netherlands
- Language: Dutch

Cobain is a 2018 Dutch drama film directed by Nanouk Leopold. In July 2018, it was one of nine films shortlisted to be the Dutch entry for the Best Foreign Language Film at the 91st Academy Awards, but it was not selected.

== Cast ==
- Bas Keizer as Cobain
- Naomi Velissariou as Mia
- Wim Opbrouck as Wickmayer
- Dana Marineci as Adele
- Cosmina Stratan as Jadwiga
