= Nanouk Leopold =

Dutch film maker (born 1968)

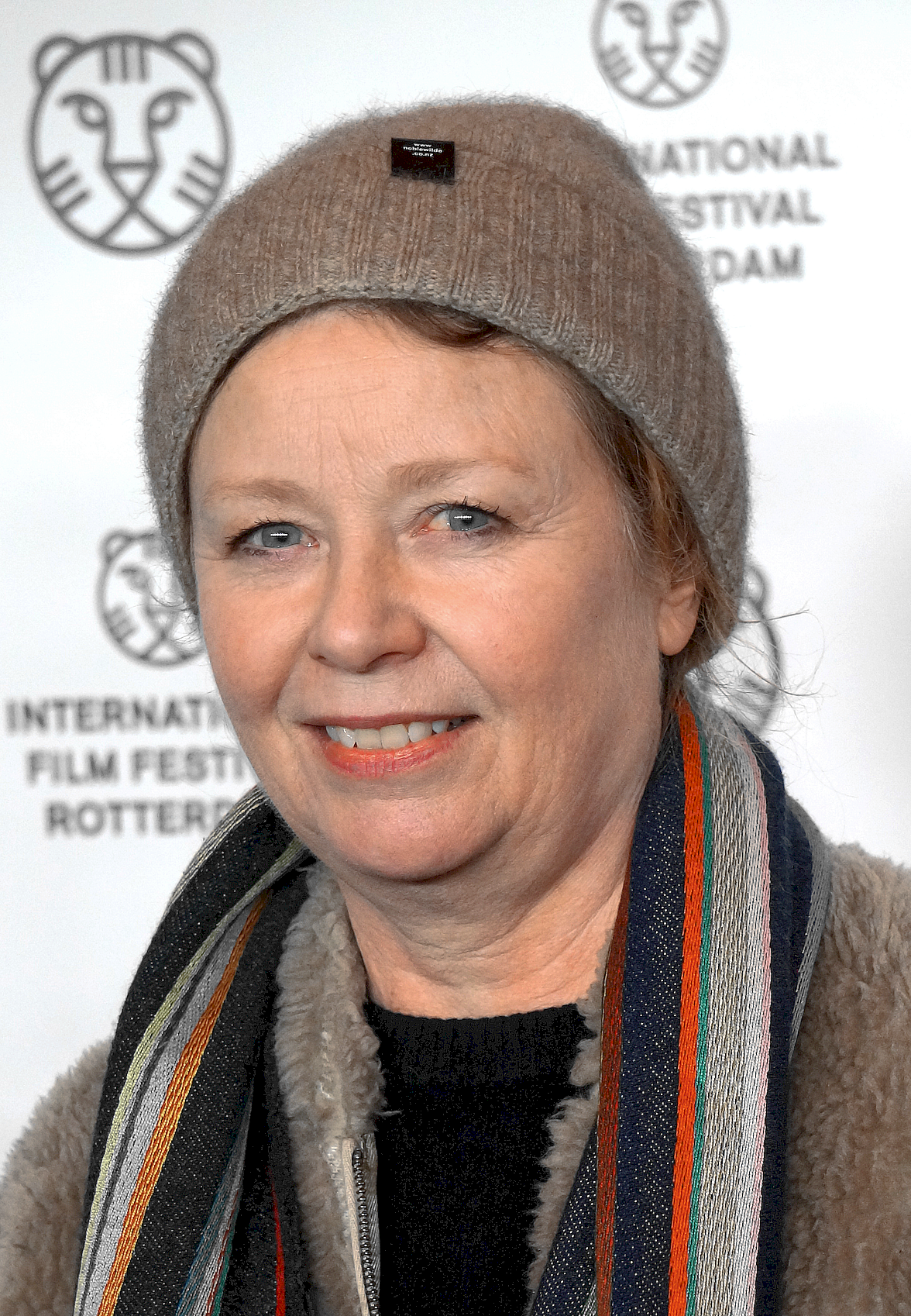
- Leopold in 2026
- Born: July 25, 1968 (age 57)

Nanouk Leopold (born 25 July 1968) is a Dutch film maker.

== Career ==
She graduated from Dutch film school in 1997, starting off by making films for Dutch television. In 2001, she released her first feature film Îles flottantes ("Floating Islands), as part of the No More Heroes project which also included the feature film debut of directors Martin Koolhoven and Michiel van Jaarsveld. Îles flottantes was selected for the Tiger Awards of the Rotterdam Film Festival.

Her long-awaited follow-up came in 2005 when she made Guernsey, which earned her two awards at the Dutch Film Festival and got her selected for Une Quinzaine des Réalisateurs at the Cannes Film Festival.

After that she directed Wolfsbergen (2007), which premiered at the Berlinale, as did her next movie: Brownian Movement, her first English spoken film.

Her first movie based on a novel, Boven is het stil by Gerbrand Bakker, was shown 2013 on the 63rd Berlin International Film Festival.

== Filmography ==
- 2001 – Îles flottantes
- 2005 – Guernsey
- 2007 – Wolfsbergen
- 2010 – Brownian Movement
- 2013 – Boven is het stil
- 2018 – Cobain
- 2025 – Whitetail
