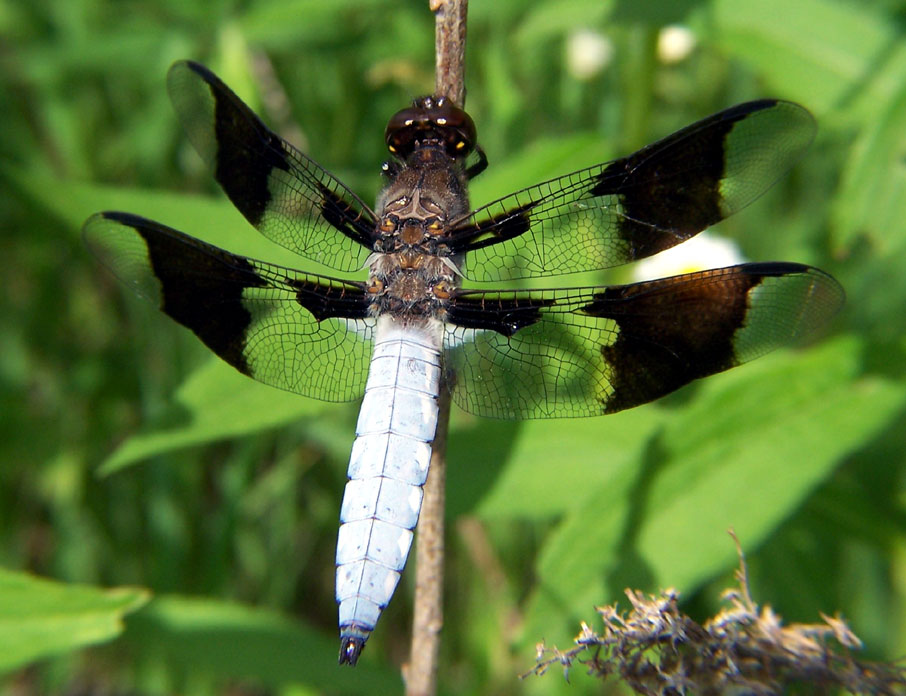
- Adult male
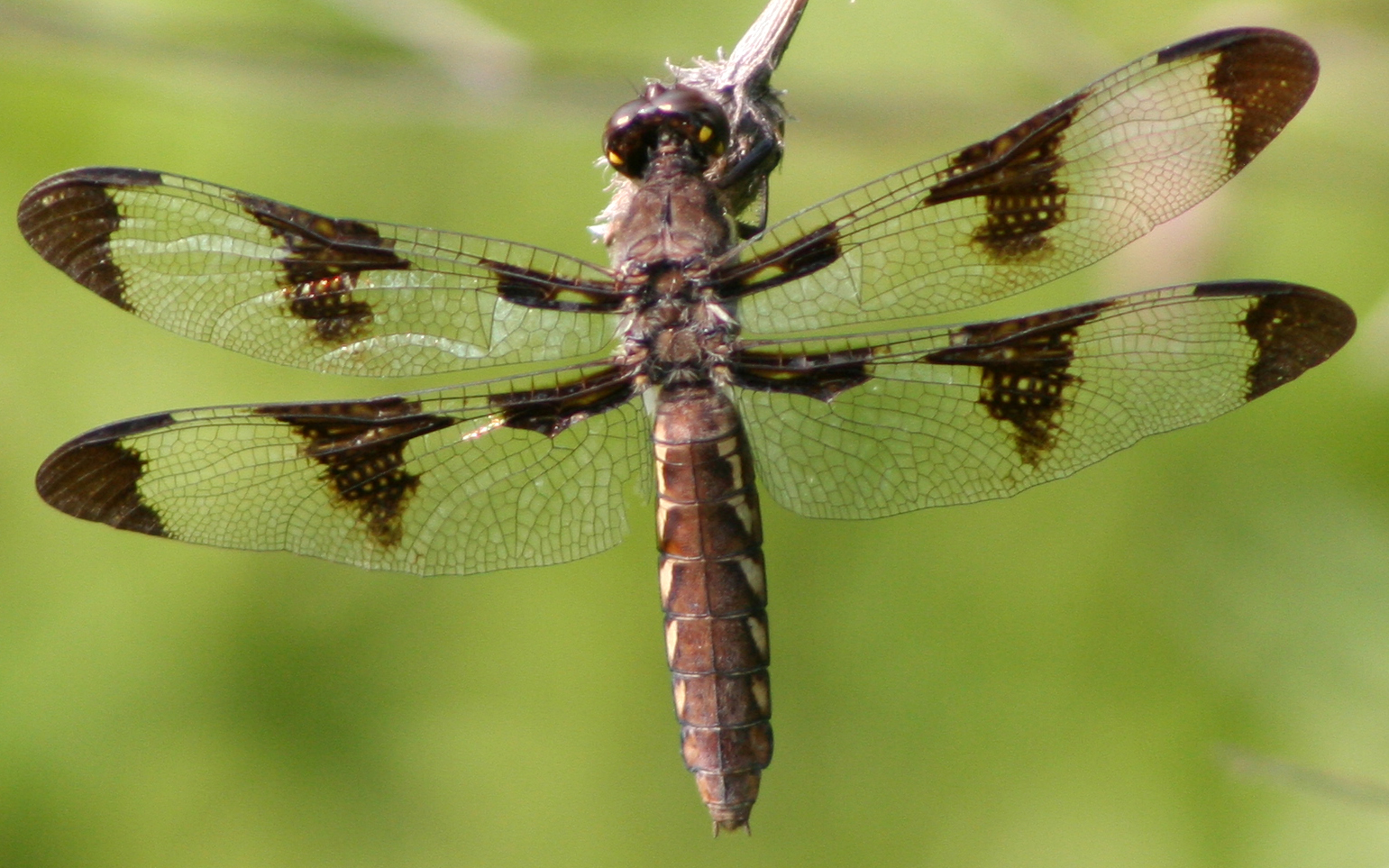
- Adult female

Scientific classification
- Kingdom: Animalia
- Phylum: Arthropoda
- Clade: Pancrustacea
- Class: Insecta
- Order: Odonata
- Infraorder: Anisoptera
- Superfamily: Libelluloidea
- Family: Libellulidae
- Genus: Plathemis
- Species: P. lydia

Binomial name
- Plathemis lydia (Drury, 1773)

Synonyms
- Libellula lydia Drury, 1773; Libellula serva Fabricius, 1793; Libellula trimaculata De Geer, 1773

= Common whitetail =

Species of dragonfly

The common whitetail or long-tailed skimmer (Plathemis lydia) is a common dragonfly across much of North America, with a striking and unusual appearance. The male's chunky white body (about 5 cm (2.0 in) long), combined with the brownish-black bands on its otherwise translucent wings, give it a checkered look. Females have a brown body and a different pattern of wing spots, closely resembling that of female Libellula pulchella, the twelve-spotted skimmer. Whitetail females can be distinguished by their smaller size, shorter bodies, and white zigzag abdominal stripes; the abdominal stripes of L. puchella are straight and yellow.

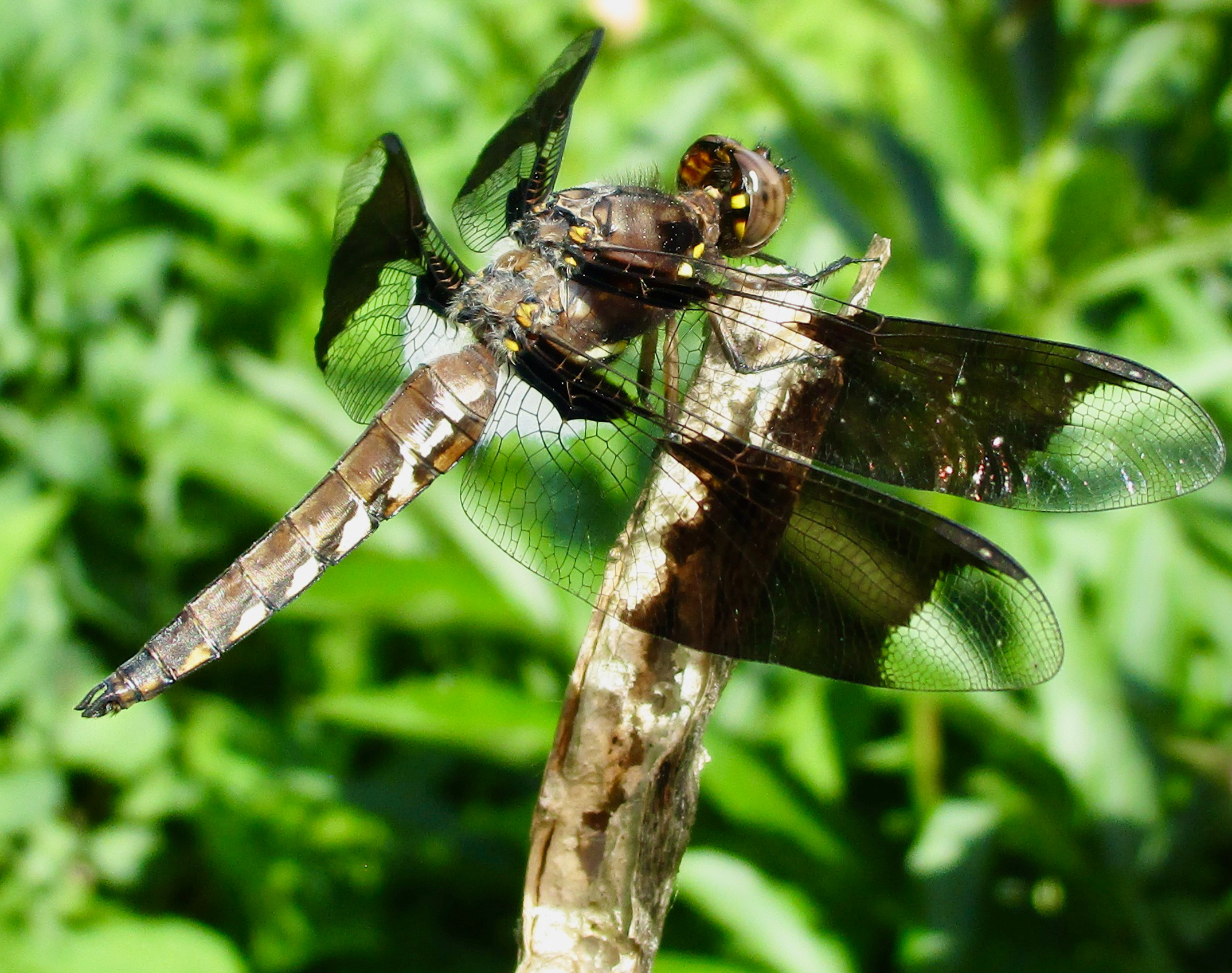
Immature male

The common whitetail can be seen hawking for mosquitoes and other small flying insects over ponds, marshes, and slow-moving rivers in most regions except the higher mountain regions. Periods of activity vary between regions; for example in California, the adults are active from April to September.

Like all perchers, common whitetails often rest on objects near the water, and sometimes on the ground. Males are territorial, holding a 10-to-30-meter stretch (30 to 100 ft) of the water's edge, and patrolling it to drive off other males. The white pruinescence on the abdomen, found only in mature males, is displayed to other males as a territorial threat.

The nymphs are dark green or brown, but are usually found covered in algae. They feed on aquatic invertebrates such as mayfly larvae and small crayfish, and also on small aquatic vertebrates such as tadpoles and minnows. Because of their abundance, whitetail naiads are in turn an important food source for various fish, frogs, and birds, and also for other aquatic insects.

Some authorities classify the whitetails, including the common whitetail, in genus Libellula rather than Plathemis. This matter has been debated at least since the end of the nineteenth century. Recent molecular systematic evidence suggests that separation of the whitetails from the rest of Libellula may be appropriate.

== Mating ==
Every few days, female Plathemis lydia dragonflies will go to ponds in order to oviposit (lay eggs). Male dragonflies that are defending mating territories at the ponds will then attempt to mate with the female dragonflies. While the females are at the pond to oviposit, they will actively discriminate against the males attempting to mate with them, rejecting up to 48.9% of all mating attempts. The females prefer to oviposit in the middle of the day, and will actively look for particular parts of the pond to find a more suitable place to lay their eggs. While male rejection is quite high, mate choice appears to be of little importance. It seems that phenotypic characteristics such as body mass, wing length, and first day of reproduction do not directly affect selection in either males or females. Male-male competition on the other hand is very important, as males fight for territories that offer a better place for females to lay their eggs. This competition for territory leads to a dominance hierarchy, where individual males recognize and maintain territorial boundaries. In this hierarchy, dominant males have an advantage of mating with females over their subordinate counterparts. However, there was no difference in reproductive success of disperser males and non-disperser males. Disperser males are those that leave a territory in search of a new one. The quality of the territory had a larger impact on reproductive success than the duration of time a male spent occupying a single territory. While it is clear that females generally fail to discriminate against males, it is not clear why they do not, given the opportunity. One such reason may be that rapid mating was selected for over evolutionary time. Predation on females during mating periods, as well as risks of males losing their territories during the process of mating also may be important factors as to why females fail to discriminate.

Due to the need to fight off other males in order to be more successful in breeding, male dragonflies have developed extensive flight muscles. The majority of male Plathemis lydia dragonflies' body mass is accounted for by flight muscle, and is one of the highest flight-muscle ratio (FMR, found by flight-muscle mass/body weight) of an animal. Males with smaller FMRs have a slight decrease in mating success when compared to their counterparts. This decrease in success found in males with a smaller FMR can be contributed to a decrease in the ability to compete in aerial contests. However, a tradeoff must be made in order to have a larger FMR. Males that were found to have the highest FMR had the least amount of gut contents, and in turn less fat reserves. This means that the male dragonflies are making a tradeoff between flight ability and longevity, which may affect long-term mating success.

Ovipositing + mate-guarding

The act of copulation begins with the male clasping the neck of the female. The female then bends her abdomen forward into the secondary genitalia of the male, which is located on the second abdominal segment. Once the female has moved into this position (known as the "wheel position"), the male is able to remove the sperm of any prior mates, and transfer his own sperm to the female. Due to the need for the female to enter the wheel position, males cannot force themselves onto females. Post mating, male P. lydia dragonflies will perform "non-contact mate-guarding throughout oviposition". During this time, the male dragonflies will hover roughly 0.5-1m away from their mate, and chase off any rival males that may be attempting to mate with the female. The intensity at which males guard females is positively correlated with the frequency of male harassment that occurs during the oviposition. However, males tend to guard less intensely over the course of the oviposition process, and will stop guarding entirely once it has finished. This behavior of mate-guarding relates to the territoriality of dragonflies. Oviposit usually follows shortly after the male has transferred his sperm.

Females must find a suitable position to lay their eggs, as there are many factors that affect the success of the eggs. One such factor is temperature. A study found that temperature had incontestable effects on both embryogenic rate and hatching success in P. lydia eggs. Female P. lydia often deposit their eggs in water, mud, or even vegetation as these are often suitable locations that increase the success of the eggs. Female P. lydia employ many strategies when it comes to deciding on a suitable location to deposit their eggs. A female P. lydia may deposit her eggs in multiple locations, in order to avoid having all of her eggs eaten at once. Often this involves flipping her eggs with her abdomen so that the eggs are widely dispersed, as shown in the accompanying video. Females may also deposit their eggs in smaller bodies of water, where fish are less likely to occur. Once the eggs have been deposited, female P. lydia have limited influence on the survival of offspring because they do not provide parental care.

== Life cycle ==
Dragonflies, including Plathemis lydia, spend most of their life cycle as aquatic larvae or nymphs, during which there is up to a 99.9% mortality rate. The two most common sources of mortality during the aquatic stage of life are predation and desiccation. P. lydia then enter the adult stage of life, which only lasts a few weeks. During the adult stage of life, P. lydia mate and select suitable sites to deposit their eggs.

== Anatomy ==
Plathemis lydia are adapted to swift flight that is made possible by the presence of broad wings and powerful muscles that move them. This means that there is a need for a plentiful supply of oxygen in order to work the muscles. In order to meet this oxygen requirement, P. lydia are equipped with a complex tracheal system which belongs to the peripneustic type in which the prothoracic and abdominal stigmata are present but not functional through the larva stage of life. The P. lydia nymph is aquatic, and thus do not use their wings during this period of their life, which accounts for the lack of function of the prothoracic and abdominal stigmata.

== Additional images ==
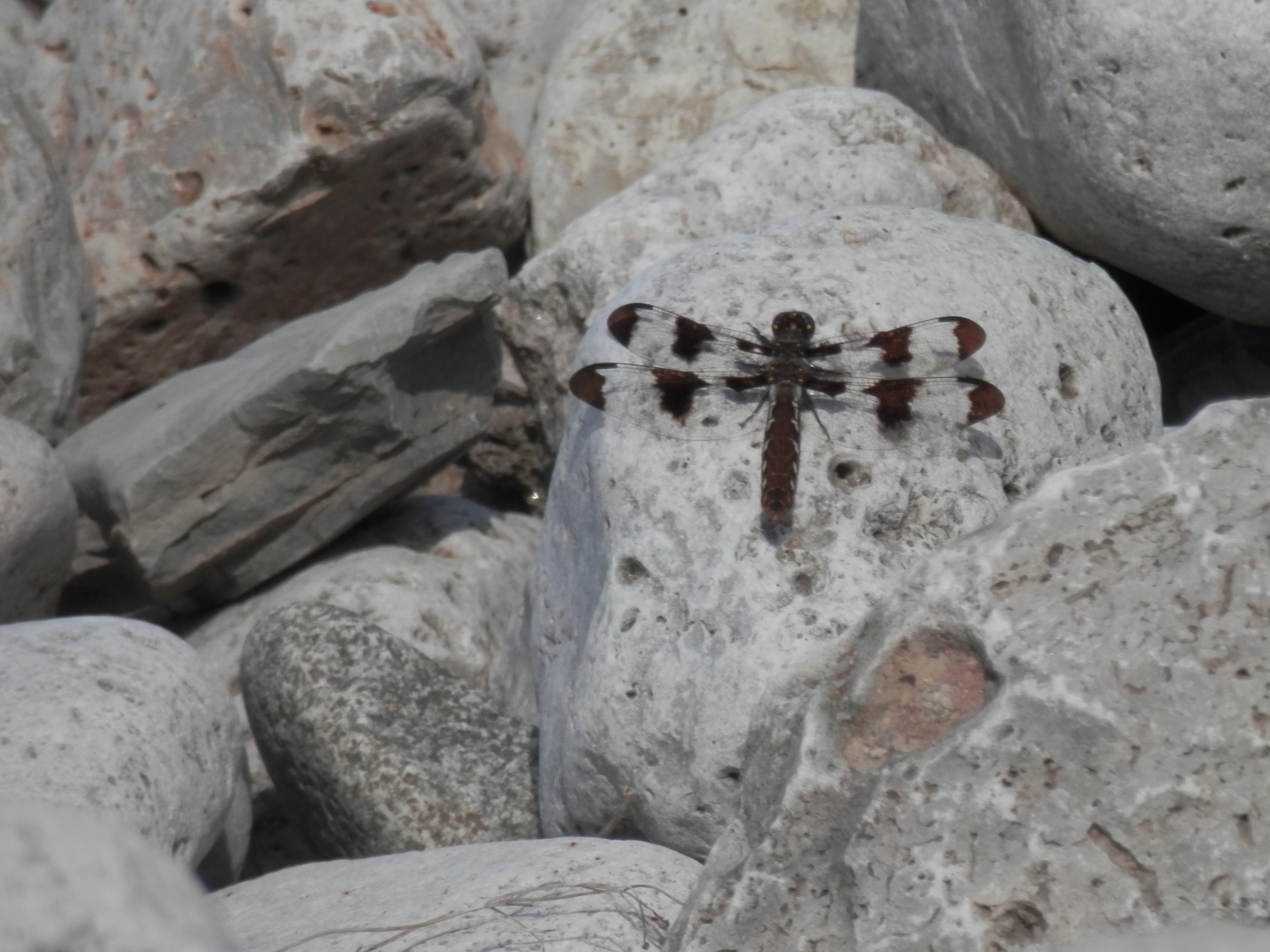
Female

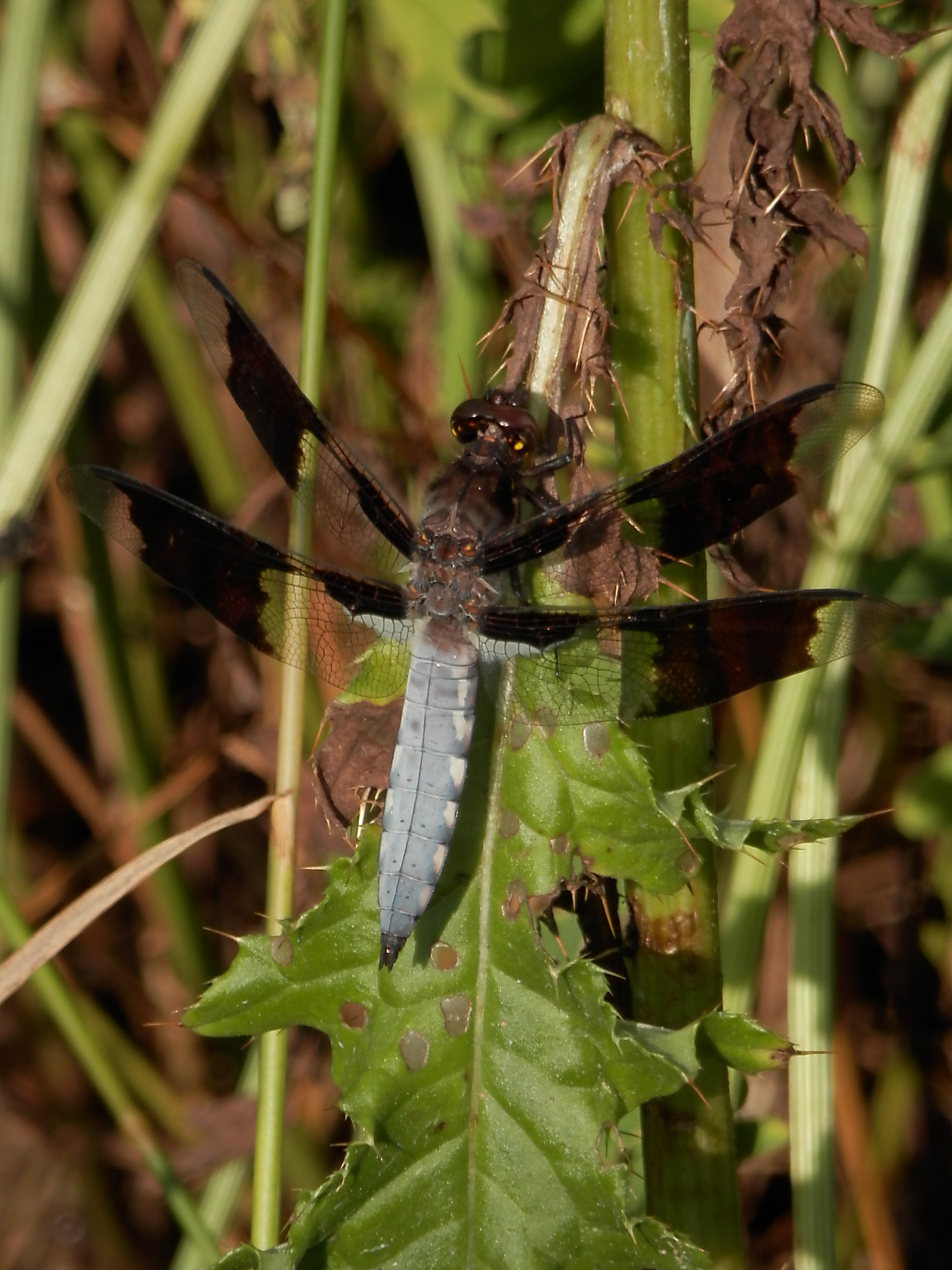
Male

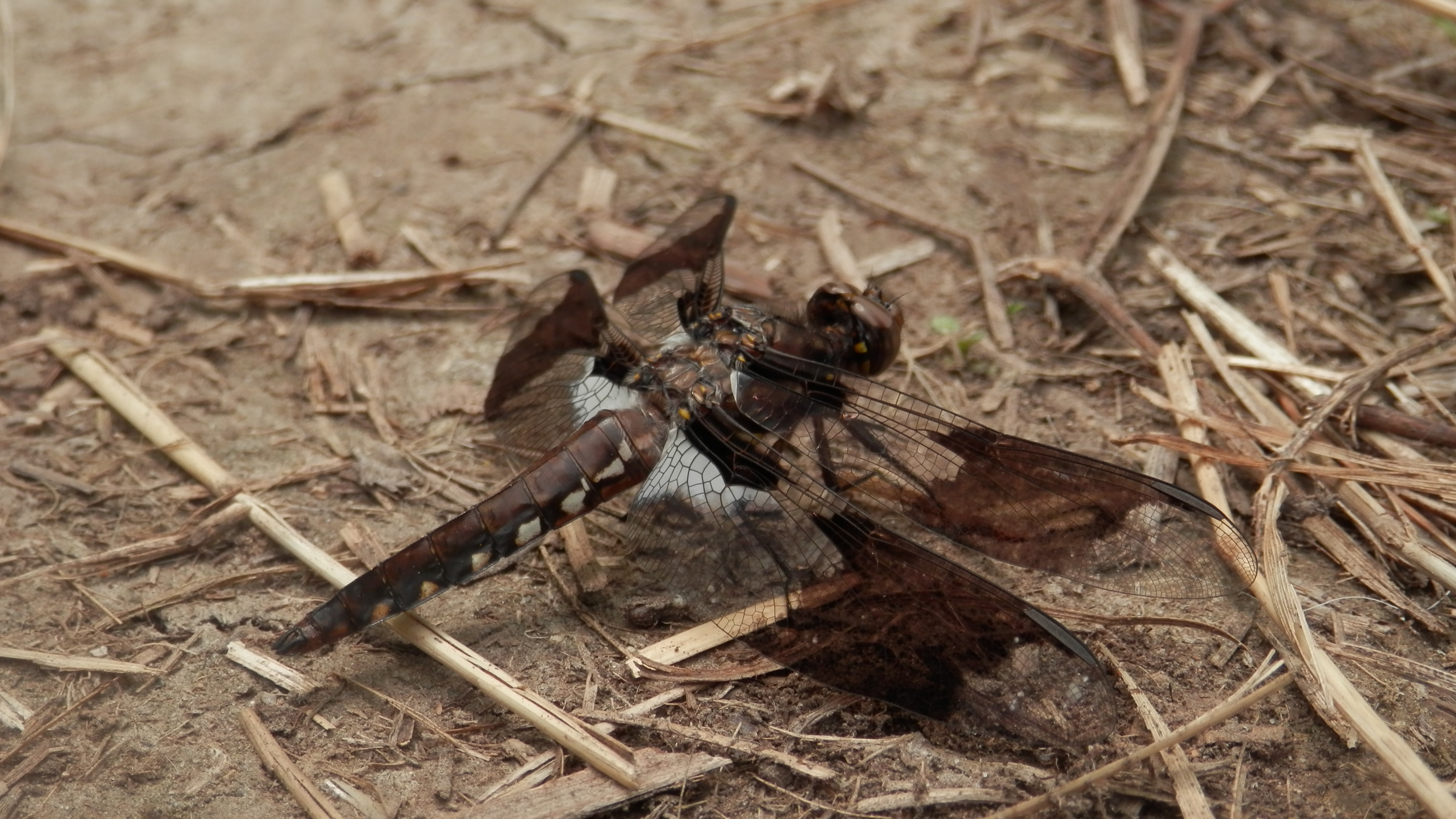
Immature male

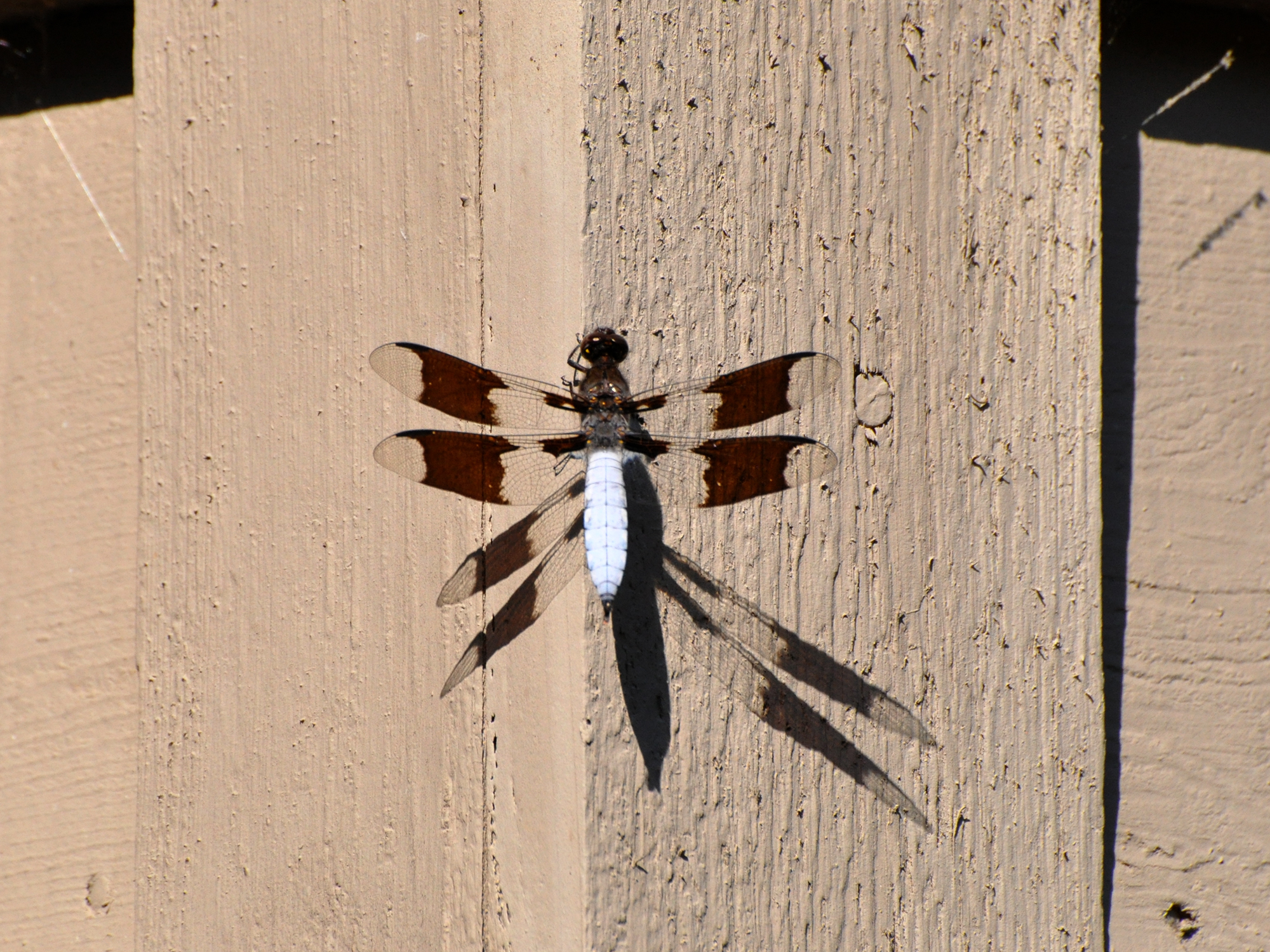
Male

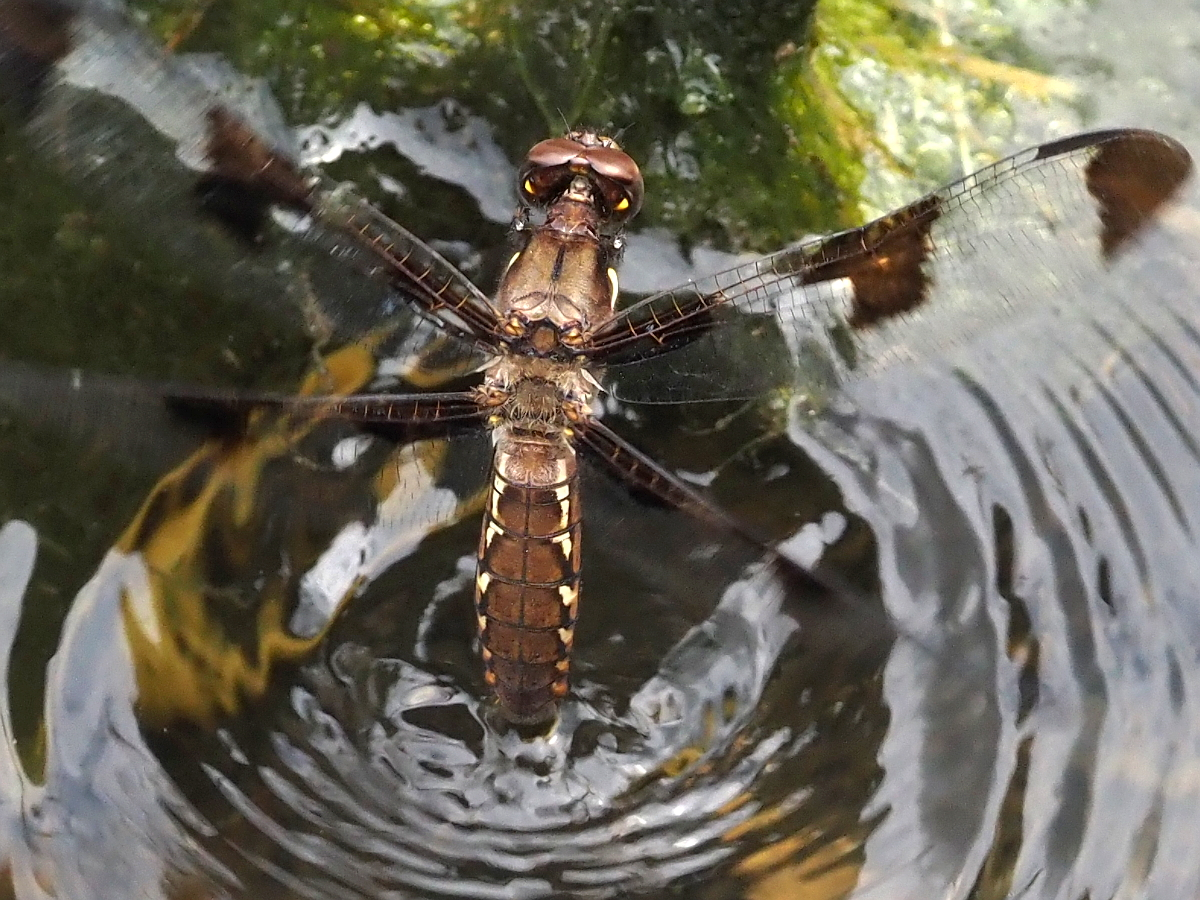
Female ovipositing
