= Pruinescence =

Frost-like coating

Pruinescence /ˌpruːɪˈnɛsəns/, or pruinosity, is a "frosted" or dusty-looking coating on top of a surface. It may also be called a pruina (plural: pruinae), from the Latin word for hoarfrost. The adjectival form is pruinose /ˈpruːɪnoʊs, -z/.

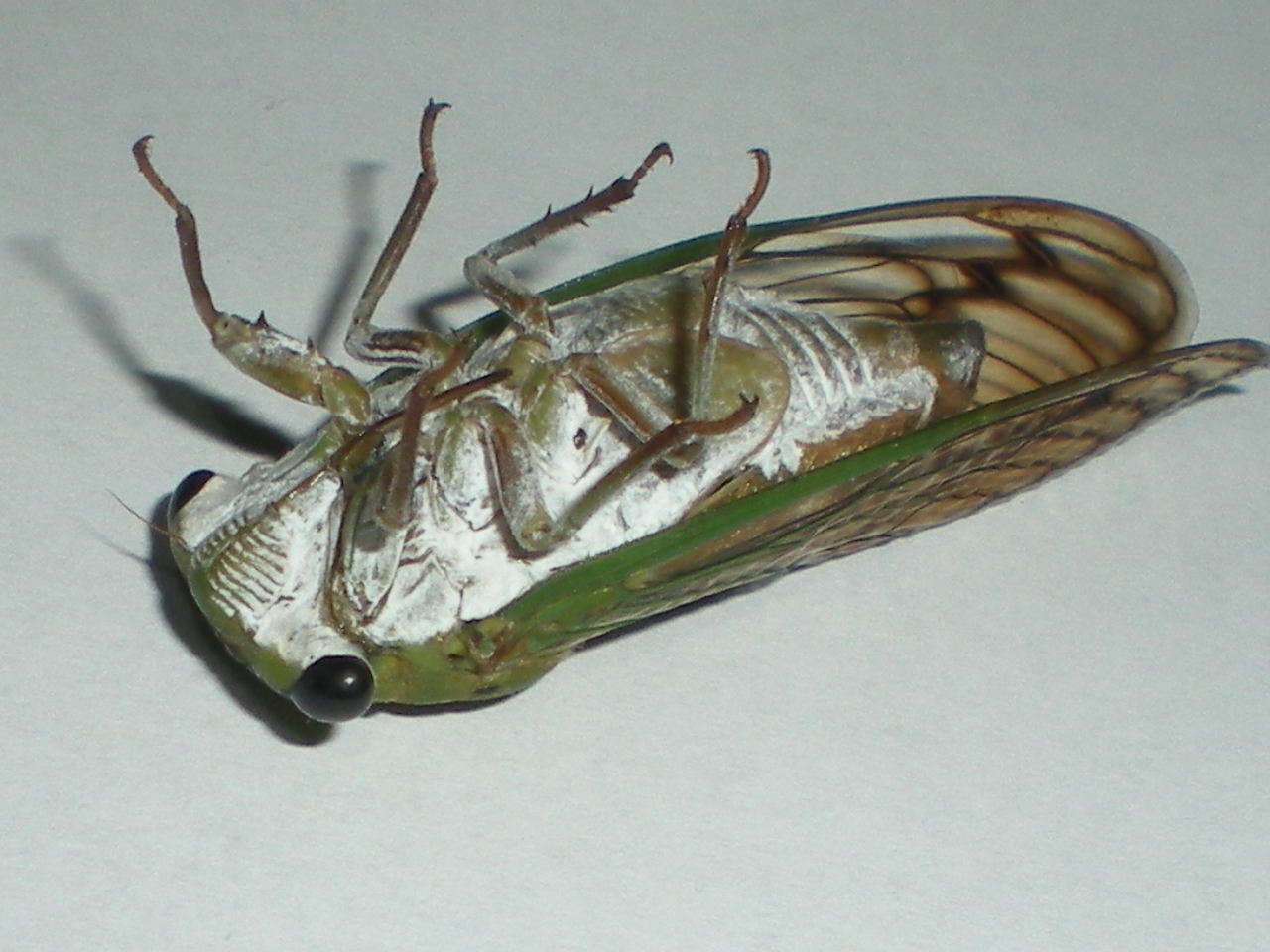
A cicada displaying ventral pruinescence

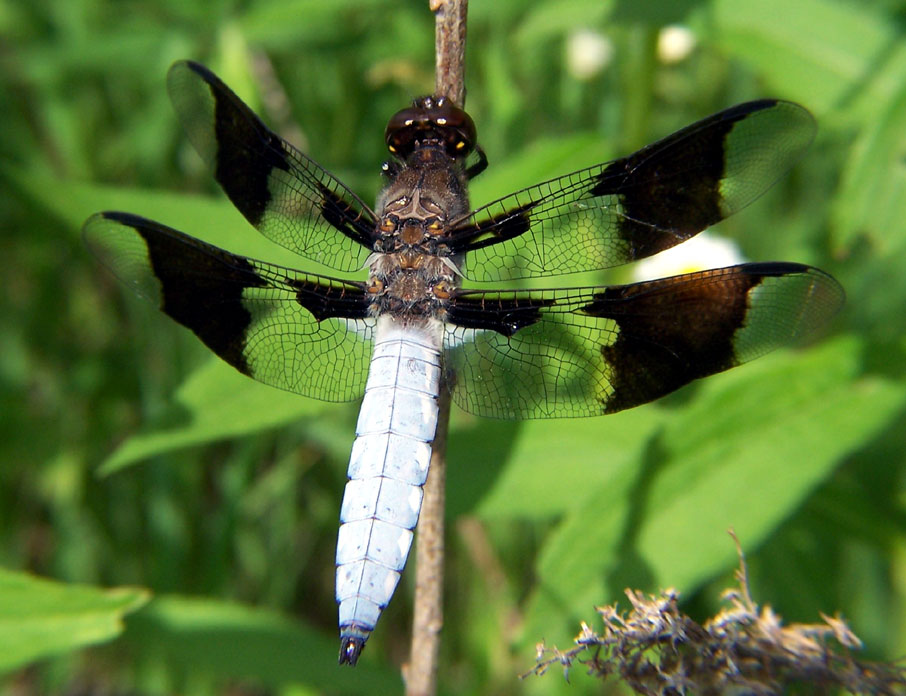
Mature male common whitetail with pruinescence covering the abdomen

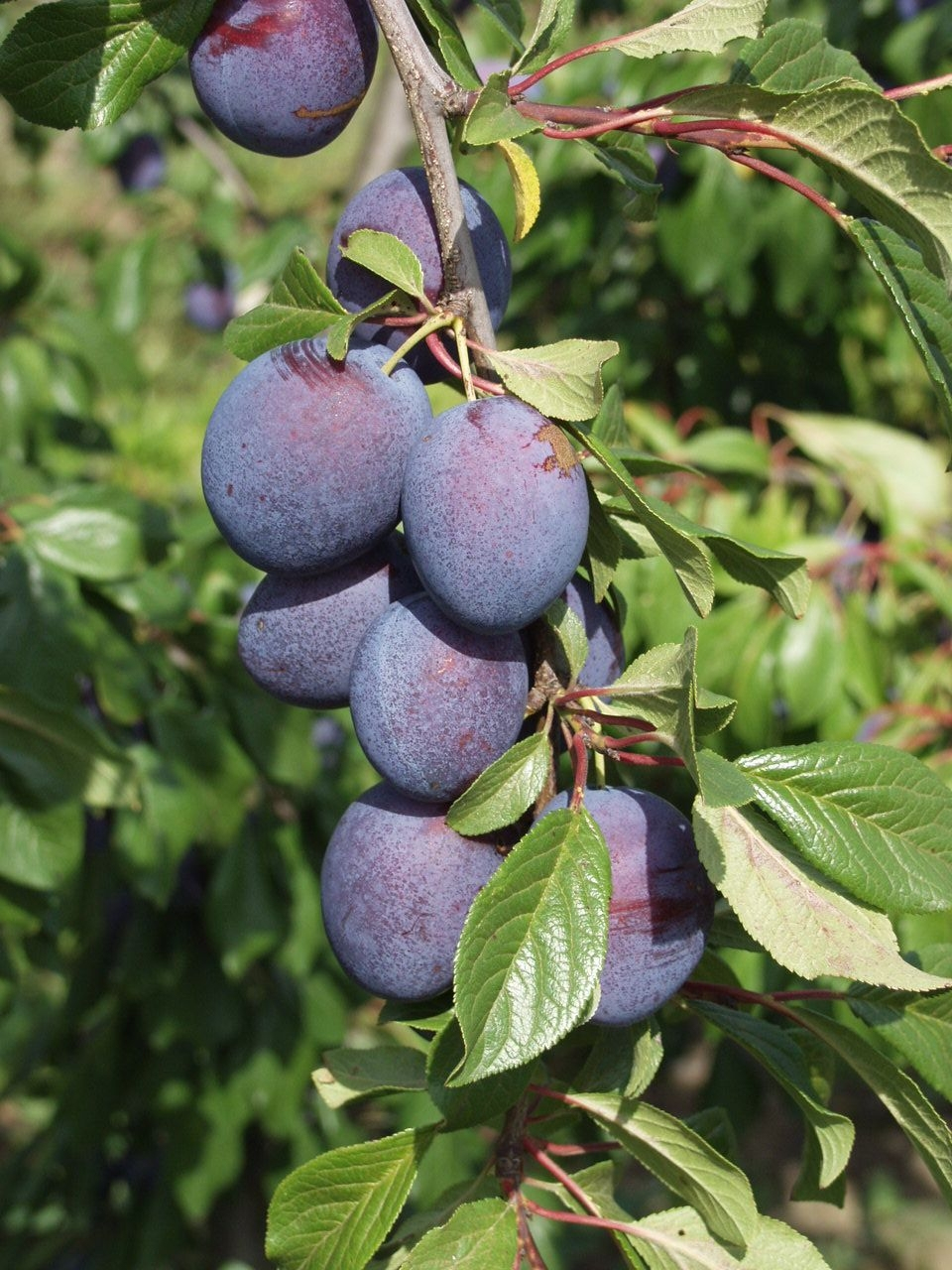
Pruina on plums

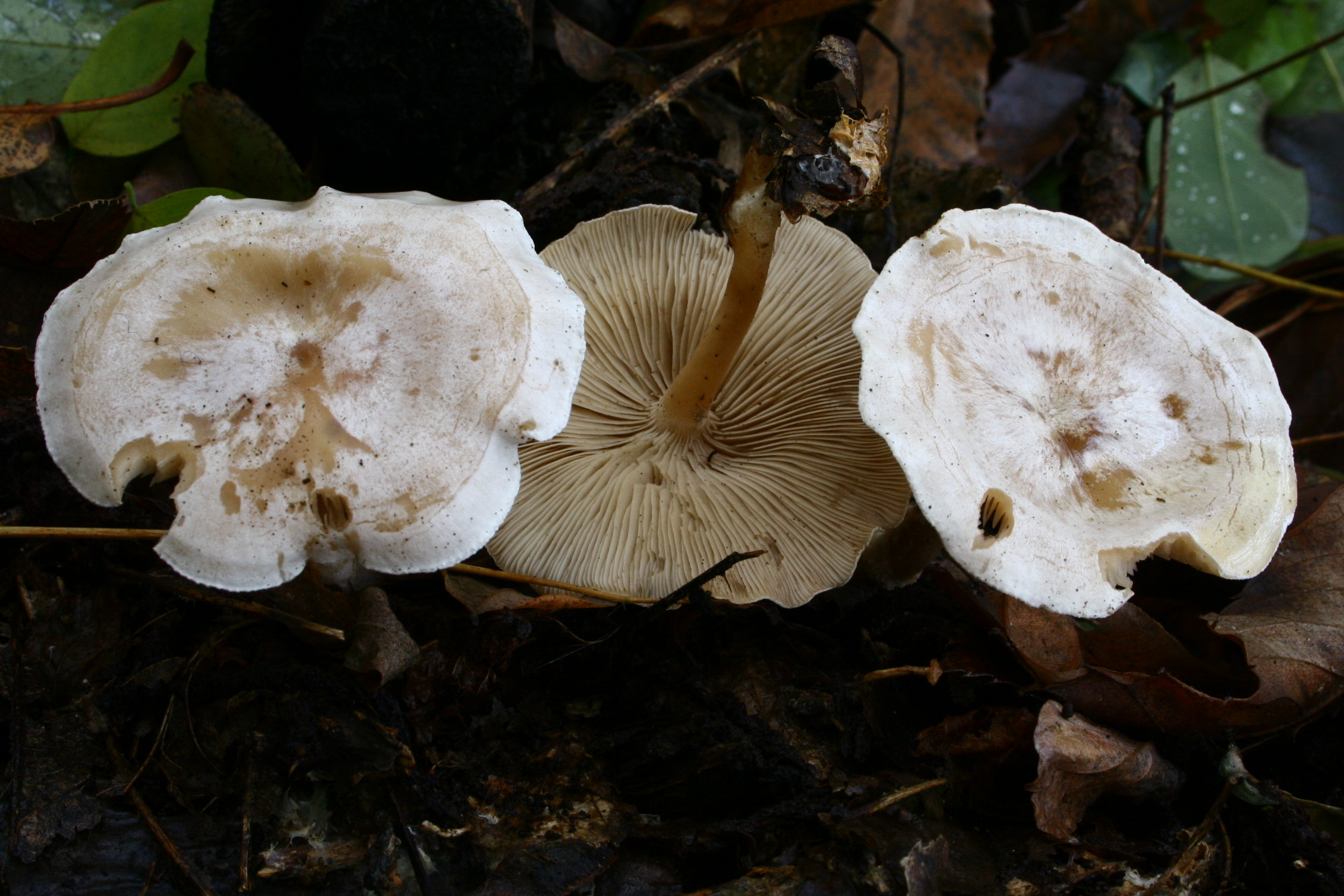
Characteristic pruina on cap of Collybia phyllophila

== Entomology ==
In insects, a "bloom" caused by wax particles on top of an insect's cuticle covers up the underlying coloration, giving a dusty or frosted appearance. The pruinescence is commonly white to pale blue in color but can be gray, pink, purple, or red; these colors may be produced by Tyndall scattering of light. When pale in color, pruinescence often strongly reflects ultraviolet.

Pruinescence is found in many species of Odonata, particularly damselflies of the families Lestidae and Coenagrionidae, where it occurs on the wings and body. Among true dragonflies it is most common on male Libellulidae (skimmers).

In the common whitetail and blue dasher dragonflies (Plathemis lydia and Pachydiplax longipennis), males display the pruinescence on the back of the abdomen to other males as a territorial threat. Other Odonata may use pruinescence to recognize members of their own species or to cool their bodies by reflecting radiation away.

== Plants, fungi, and lichens ==
The term pruinosity is also applied to "blooms" on plants—for example, on the skin of grapes—and to powderings on the cap and stem of mushrooms, which can be important for identification.

Pruina in lichens frequently consists of calcium oxalate crystals deposited on the surface of the thallus or reproductive structures. In the family Teloschistaceae, these crystalline deposits serve multiple ecological functions, including protection against excessive sunlight. The abundance of pruina can vary significantly depending on environmental conditions, with some species showing increased crystal formation when exposed to higher levels of solar radiation. Studies have also suggested that pruinose deposits may help lichens neutralize the effects of certain pollutants, such as sulfur dioxide, with evidence indicating that the amount of surface pruina may correlate with local pollution levels.

While pruina is often a response to environmental conditions, its presence and distribution can sometimes serve as a taxonomic feature in lichen identification. However, because pruina formation is heavily influenced by environmental factors, it is generally considered less reliable for taxonomic purposes than internal crystalline deposits. The composition of pruina can vary, with calcium oxalate occurring in two distinct mineral forms: weddellite (CaC_{2}O_{4}·(2+x)H_{2}O), which is typically found in dry environments and may serve as a water source for the lichen, and whewellite (CaC_{2}O_{4}·H_{2}O), which is more commonly found in moist habitats.

An epinecral layer is "a layer of horny dead fungal hyphae with indistinct lumina in or near the cortex above the algal layer".
