= List of Dutch documentary films =

A Dutch documentary film is a documentary film made by a director of (partly) Dutch origin. Dutch documentary films are not necessarily bound to Dutch topics or locations in the Netherlands.

== History ==
=== Before 1945 ===
The short film Inhuldiging Koningin Wilhelmina te Amsterdam was made in 1898 and is the oldest surviving Dutch film. The first known Dutch documentary was made in 1916 by Johann Vierboom. The film Storm en noodweer in Nederland shows the 1916 flood disaster at the coasts of the Zuiderzee. Another documentary film of this era is Holland Neutraal: De leger- en vlootfilm (1917) by Willy Mullens. One of the most famous Dutch documentary film directors is Joris Ivens. Ivens started making his own films in 1928. The first was an avant-garde look at a Rotterdam bridge, The Bridge (De brug, 1928). His later films were more realistic, socially concerned and polemical. The Spanish Earth (1937) is one of his most famous films. In order to make internationally oriented documentaries, Ivens travelled to countries such as the Soviet Union, Spain, China, Australia and the United States.

=== 1945-1965 ===
After the Second World War, films of the acclaimed documentary film directors Bert Haanstra and Herman van der Horst dominated Dutch cinema. Their work is internationally known as the ‘Dutch Documentary School’. A feature of the documentary films of this era is the use of human beings as a metaphor. Van der Horst and Haanstra both won prizes at the Cannes Film Festival. Van der Horst's most famous movie is Faja Lobbi (1960), while Haanstra gained international fame for his renowned documentary Alleman (The Human Dutch, 1963). Other directors of the Dutch Documentary School are Charles Huguenot van der Linden, and John Fernhout.

=== After 1965 ===
After the era of the Dutch Documentary School, Dutch documentaries lost their uniformity. Instead of forming a group, joining forces and sharing stylistic trademarks, filmmakers mostly worked on independent projects or projects for television networks. Contemporary documentary directors have produced a wide variety of works. Contemporary directors with international successes are Jos de Putter, Heddy Honigmann, Johan van der Keuken and Leonard Retel Helmrich. In the late 20th century, documentary films are mainly shown on Dutch television networks, although some cinemas and art houses show Dutch documentary films. Nowadays, internet provides worldwide access to Dutch documentary films displayed online.

== Dutch organizations regarding documentary films ==
=== Dutch funds ===
- The Netherlands Film Fund offers financial support to develop, actualize and distribute documentary film productions, designated for cinema.
- Mediafonds offers subsidy for the development and production of, among other things, documentary films by public broadcasting.

=== Online broadcasting ===
- Holland Doc 24 is a Dutch digital documentary channel. The channel is continuously broadcasting sections of multiple public broadcasting channels, including the programs VPRO's Import, Zembla, Tegenlicht, NCRV Dokument, Profiel, Reporter and Het uur van de Wolf.
- The Docsonline Foundation is an independent, Dutch non-profit organization with a mission to support professional documentary makers financially by exposing their work on a wide international scale to a paying audience. The foundation organizes a documentary on-demand website which provides a collection of over 400 documentary films.

=== Film festivals ===
The following Dutch film festivals are known to show (Dutch) documentary films:

- International Documentary Film Festival Amsterdam, the world's largest documentary film festival held annually in Amsterdam.
- Netherlands Film Festival, an annual film festival held in Utrecht. Dutch film productions are exhibited, including documentaries.
- International Film Festival Rotterdam, an annual film festival held in Rotterdam
- Beeld voor Beeld festival in Amsterdam is an annual documentary film festival with a main focus on ethnographic film.
- Movies that matter Festival is an annual film festival, emphasizing on documentary films about human rights.

== List of Dutch documentary films ==
title	director	year
Unknown Brood	Dennis Alink	2016
Are All Men Pedophiles?	Jan-Willem Breure	2012
A philosopher for all seasons	Benny Brunner	1991
Across the border	Saskia Vredeveld	1999
Al nakba	Benny Brunner	1997
Andre Hazes, Zij gelooft in mij	John Appel	1999
Ave Maria	Nouchka van Brakel	2006
Between heaven and hell	Joost Seelen	2002
Birthplace Unknown	Karin Junger	1988
Boys	Menna Laura Meijer	2005
Bram	Joost Verheij	1993
Broken Silence	Eline Flipse	1996
Cannot run away	Hillie Molenaar & Joop van Wijk	1988
Child of the commune	Maroesja Perizonius	2004
Crossroads	Hillie Molenaar & Joop van Wijk	1997
Dana Lixenberg, thru Dutch eyes	Pieter van der Houwen	1999
Daughters of the Nile	Hillie Molenaar & Joop van Wijk	1982
De brug	Joris Ivens	1928
Deacon of Death	Jan van den Berg	2004
Democracy's dilemma	Ijsbrand van Veelen & Dorothee Forma	2007
Desi	Maria Ramos	2000
Duende	Ramon Gieling	1986
Dutch touch	Ulrike Helmer	2006
Electronic curtain	Walther Grotenhuis	1997
En passant	Mirjam Boelsums & Lony Scharenborg	2003
Faja Lobbi	Herman van der Horst	1960
Fatal reaction Bombay	Marijke Jongbloed	1998
Fatal reaction Moscow	Marijke Jongbloed	2000
Fatal reaction New York	Marijke Jongbloed	1996
Fatal reaction Singapore	Marijke Jongbloed	1996
Finding courage	Joop van Wijk	2004
First Kill	Coco Schrijber	2001
Fokking hell!	Peter ter Velde, Eric Feijten & Hans Stakelbeek	2010
Food is waste	Rob van Hattum	2007
Grito de piedra	Ton van Zantvoort	2006
Hans: Het Leven Voor De Dood	Louis van Gasteren	1983
Holland neutraal, de leger- en vlootfilm	Willy Mullens	1917
I'm Never Afraid!	Willem Baptist	2010
In a white man's land	Kim Landstra	2000
It is no dream	Benny Brunner & Joseph Rochlitz	2002
Isingiro Hospital	Hillie Molenaar & Joop van Wijk	1992
Juggernaut	Rob Das	2003
Lockerbie Revisited	Gideon Levy	2005
Lomax the Songhunter	Rogier Kappers	2005
Grenzeloze Liefde - Made in Africa	Puck de Leeuw	1999
Grenzeloze Liefde - Made in Japan	Puck de Leeuw	1996
Lust for gold	Joost Kraanen	1990
Made in China	Eline Flipse	2005
Mama Calle	Arjanne Laan	1990
Miss interpreted, Marlene Dumas	Rudolf Everhuis & Joost Verheij	1997
My beloved country	Saskia Vredeveld	1991
Nostalgia for death	Ramon Gieling	1992
On the threshold of oblivion	Tom Verheul	2003
Pool	Mirjam Boelsums & Lony Scharenborg	1999
Prison blues	Saskia Vredeveld	2002
Procedure 769, witness to an execution	Jaap van Hoewijk	1995
Punk, forever	Alfred de Boer	1996
Purple hearts	VPRO	2004
Rex Gildo, the fall of a schmalz king	Hans Heijnen	2003
Rock 'n roll junkie	Eilander, v.d. Bosch, v.d. Lee & v.d. Sterre	1994
Romania, the taming of intellectuals	Benny Brunner	1990
Rouch's gang	Joost Verheij	1998
Sark, small world	Joost Seelen	2002
Selfportrait, Roger Ballen	Sasia Vredeveld	2002
Smile and wave	Marijke Jongbloed	2003
Sport, a mental issue	Lies Niezen	2000
Serengeti Symphony	Hugo van Lawick	1998
Storm en noodweer in Nederland	Johann Vierboom	1916
Sunny spells	Ruud Monster	1987
Tabee toean	Tom Verheul	1995
That paradise will be mine	Merel Beernink	2005
The concrete curtain	Benny Brunner	2005
The daily nation	Hillie Molenaar & Joop van Wijk	2000
The factory	Hillie Molenaar & Joop van Wijk	1981
The forgery	Arjanne Laan	2001
The Human Dutch	Bert Haanstra	1963
The making of a new empire	Jos de Putter	1999
The new silver	Alexandra Jansse	2005
The price of cotton	Karin Junger	2005
The return	Joost Verheij	1990
The seventh million	Benny Brunner	1995
The Spanish Earth	Joris Ivens	1937
The truth according to Wikipedia	Ijsbrand van Veelen	2008
The tunnel and other lies	Vuk Janic	2005
The wall	Benny Brunner	2003
The war on drugs	VPRO	2003
Treatment for traitors	Ike Bertels	1983
Valley of sighs	Carin Goeijers	2004
Velo negro	Arjanne Laan	1996
Voices of Bam	Aliona v.d. Horst & Maasja Ooms	2006
Water and fire	Joost Seelen	1998
Year 1, Alan Reeve after thirty years of imprisonment	Joost Seelen	1993

== See also ==
- Cinema of the Netherlands
- Documentary film
