= Golden Calf for Best Short Documentary =

Dutch film award

The following is a list of winners of the Golden Calf for best Short Documentary at the Netherlands Film Festival. This category was first awarded in 1993.

- 2026 Kiriko Mechanicus - How to Catch a Butterfly
- 2025 Gülsah Dogan - De Wolkenfietsers - Erfenis van een droom
- 2024 Sara Rajaei - City of Poets
- 2023 Wiam Al-Zabari - Mijn Vader, Nour en Ik
- 2022 Eliane Esther Bots - In Flow of Words
- 2021 Anne-Marieke Graafmans - Zie je mij, Hoor je mij
- 2020 Marina Meijer - Caroussel
- 2019 Shamira Raphaëla - De waarheid over mijn vader
- 2018 Morgan Knibbe - The Atomic Soldiers
- 2017 Elsbeth Fraanje - Snelwegkerk
- 2016 Suzanne Raes & Monique Lesterhuis - De tegenprestatie
- 2015 Hester Overmars - Verboden Vlucht
- 2014 Tijs Tinbergen & Jan Musch - MeesTV: Hoe de koolmees mij gelukkig maakt
- 2013 Astrid Bussink - Achter de toren
- 2012 Peter Delpeut - Immer Fernweh
- 2011 Joost Seelen - Zwarte Soldaten
- 2010 Ilse van Velzen & Femke van Velzen - Weapon of War
- 2009 Marije Meerman - Wanna Be A Boss
- 2008 Melle van Essen & Riekje Ziengs - Landschappen waar niemand van weet (II)
- 2007 Simone de Vries - Raak me waar ik voelen kan
- 2006 Paul Cohen - Martijn van Haalen - Photo Souvenir
- 2005 Meral Uslu - De kinderen van mijn vader
- 2004 Leo Wentink - Nijnok
- 2003 Louis van Gasteren - The Price of Survival
- 2002 Walter Stokman - Ash world suicide
- 2001 Paul Cohen and Martijn van Haalen - Hollandse helden
- 2000 Carin Goeijers - De nieuwerwetse wereld
- 1999 Martijn van Beenen - Jackson, the Man with the Box
- 1998 Leo de Boer - Engelen des doods
- 1997 Merlijn Passier - De tranen van Castro
- 1996 Gerard Jacobs - Stalin had een brug beloofd
- 1995 Maarten Schmidt & Thomas Doebele - I have a problem, madam
- 1994 Johan van der Keuken - Lucebert, tijd en afscheid
- 1993 Hillie Molenaar & Joop van Wijk - Isingiro Hospital
