= Flore Pensaert =

Belgian model, actress & activist

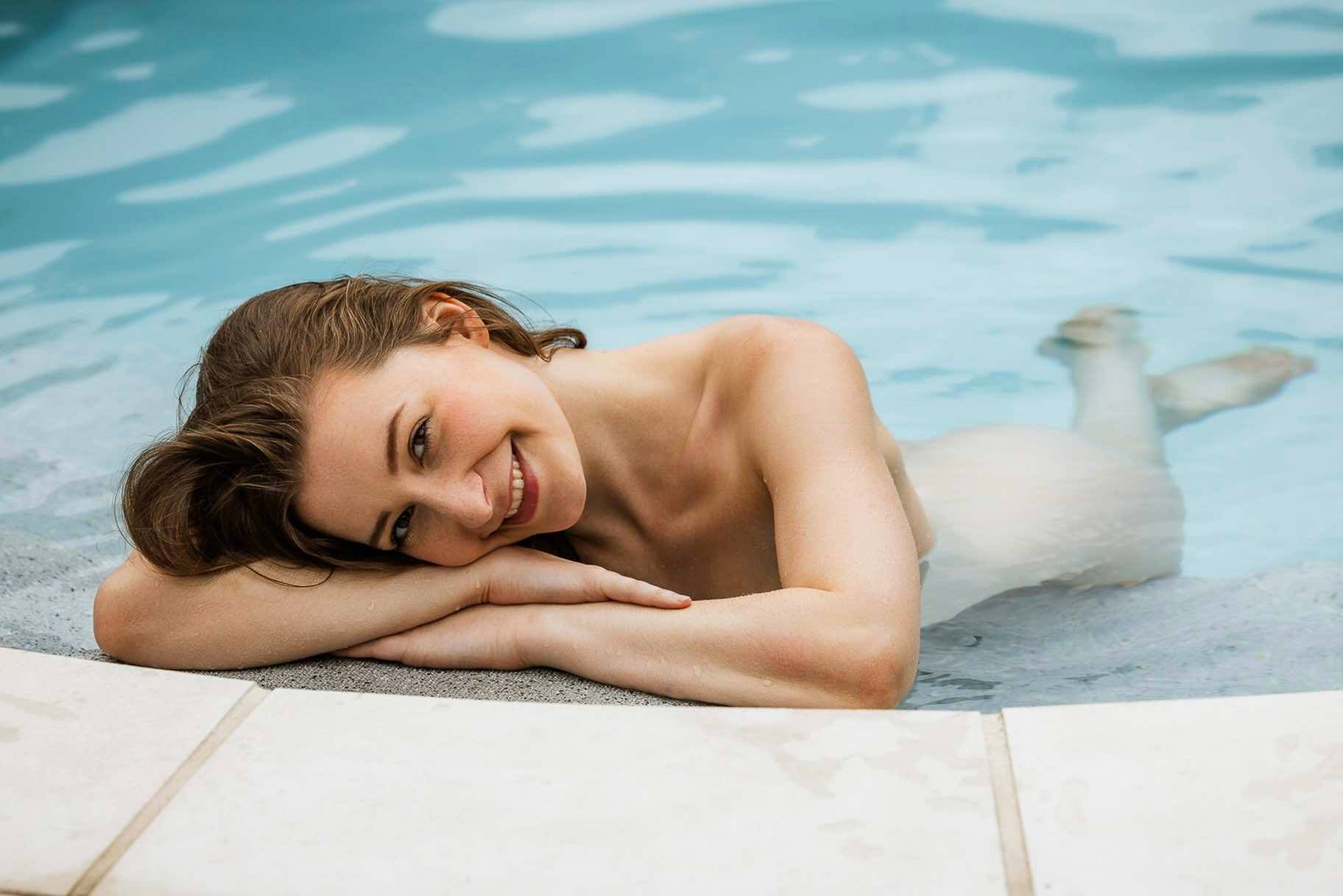
- Flore Pensaert in 2024
- Born: Flore Danny Marie-Joseph Pensaert; 1997 (age 28–29); Ghent, East-Flanders, Belgium
- Occupations: Actress; Model; Activist
- Years active: 2011–present
- Modeling information
- Height: 5 ft 8 in 173 cm
- Hair color: Dark Blonde
- Eye color: Hazel
- Website: www.florepensaert.weebly.com/about.html

Flore Danny Marie-Joseph Pensaert (born Ghent, 1997) is a Dutch-speaking Belgian nude model, actress and activist against sexual misconduct and harassment. In 2023, she was crowned as Miss Rebelgium by P-Magazine in recognition of her battles.

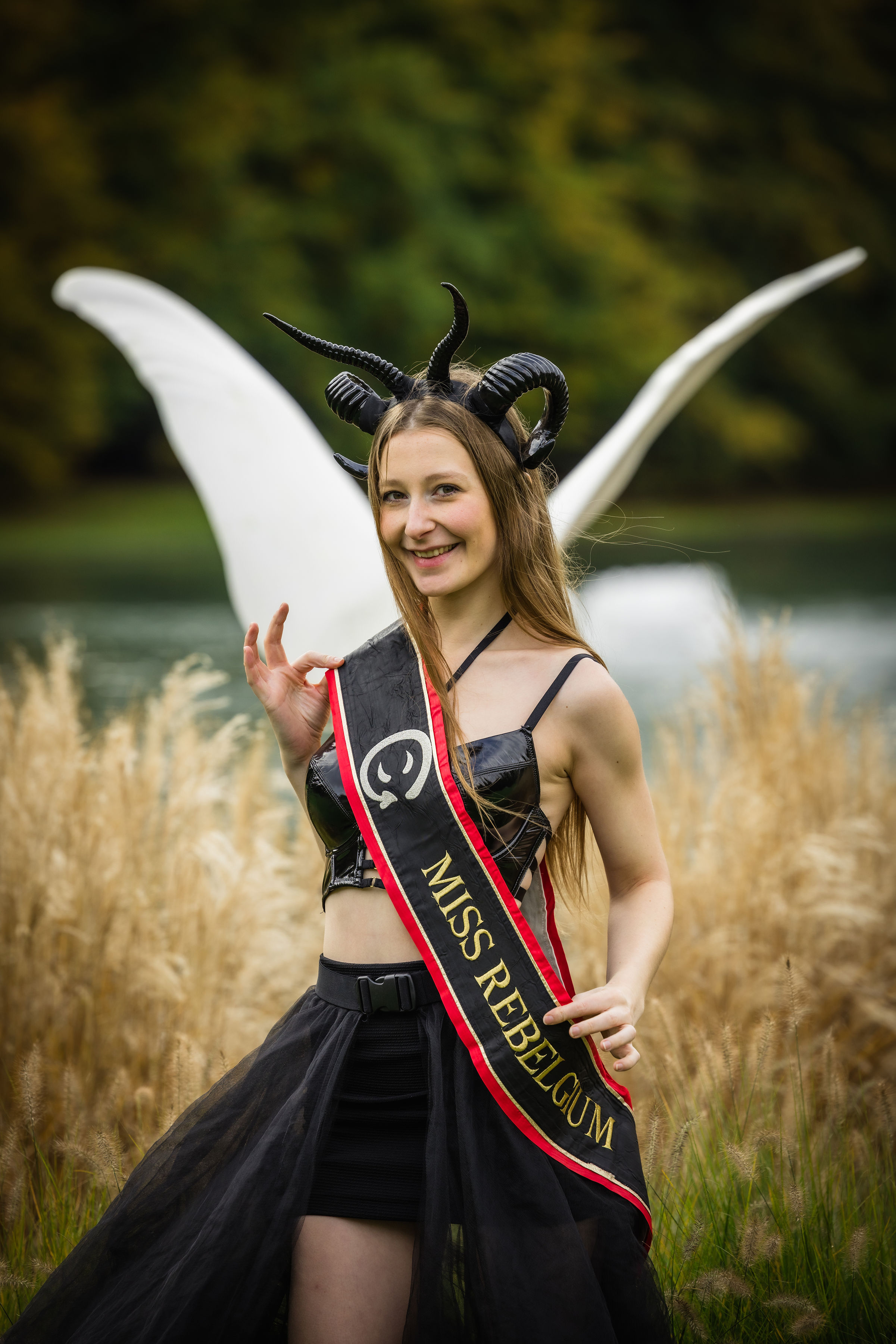
Flore Pensaert crowned as Miss Rebelgium.

== Biography ==
Pensaert was born in Ghent, after which she grew up and studied in Lokeren. She established herself as a creative individual: joining art competition Kunstbende, in the category film & the category performance for which she won third place as well as poetry readings organized by her local poetry club.

== Royal Visit ==
In 2025 Pensaert was interviewed about her life as a model & activist as part of the Belgodyssee, a Belgian journalism competition which highlights inspiring young people. This earned her a visit to the Royal Palace in Brussels, during which she requested moral support from King Filip for her work as an activist.

== Activism ==
=== #Metoo ===
In 2015 Pensaert started her filmstudies at filmschool RITCS School Of Arts in Brussels. During this period, she encountered a multitude of situations including sexual harassment on both filmsets & within the context of her studies. At the heights of the #Metoo movement in België, she testified in 2017 about these stories on talkshow Van Gils & gasten.

=== Miss Rebelgium ===
In 2023 Pensaert joined Miss Belgium. She was soon excluded from the competition. The reason for exclusion, Pensaert explained, was that her image as an artistic nude model was not deemed fit within the competition.

At the same time it became known via Belgian news source VRT NWS Journaal that Miss Belgium's photographer was guilty of sexual misconduct. In an interview with P-Magazine, Pensaert stated that she aimed to shed light on the issue, claiming she had prior knowledge of these stories and never intended to win the competition, but rather sought to expose the truth in order to protect young contestants. P-Magazine crowned her as Miss Rebelgium as a humorous acknowledgment of her battles on her 26th birthday, on which she also became their P-babe of the month.

In October 2023 news broke that Pensaert would create a calendar in cooperation with ex-misses to condemn abuse in the pageantry world. Proceeds went to The Warmest Week, a yearly Belgian crowdfunding event benefiting non-profits.

=== ISIS Fashion Awards ===
On the 8th of May 2025, Flore stormed onto the stage of the Isis Fashion Awards. She declared activist statements against organizer Jan-Willem Breure, who made a documentary called "Are All Men Pedophiles?".

Pensaert testified to PowNed that this documentary glorifies and excuses pedophilia, and that Jan-Willem Breure is guilty of sexual misconduct behind the scenes of the ISIS Fashion Awards. According to Pensaert, a multitude of models have fallen victim to these misconducts, including herself during the 2024 edition of the event.

=== Bankzitters ===
In February 2026, Pensaert revealed a situation which a fellow model allegedly experienced in late 2023 after filming with the Dutch boy group Bankzitters. The story claimed that the model in question had experienced inappropriate sexual behavior: in exchange for a large sum of money, she was allegedly group pressured by the boys into going nude. This reportedly occurred after filming the series B&B Bankzitters in the Belgian Ardennes. Drug use was also said to have been present. A few days later, the Bankzitters stated to the Dutch news channel Shownieuws that they had been in contact with the model involved and claimed that she did not experience the situation as unpleasant. Pensaert responded by saying that since the controversy she had received additional similar accounts from other alleged victims.

== Trivia ==
- In 2019 Pensaert was featured in Spoed 24/7 with her dad, a Belgian reality TV show. Cancer was suspected, but it turned out to be a lymph node infection. She's also seen in multiple short films as an actrice.
- In 2023 Pensaert appeared in "My Body & Me", a section of Belgian magazine Flair, wherein she discusses her relationship with her body & calls for bodypositivity.
- Pensaert ran catwalks in Leicester Fashion Week & London Fashion Week in 2022, 2023 & 2024. In 2025 she walked Paris Fashion Week.
