= Jan Bastiaans =

Dutch psychiatrist (1917–1997)

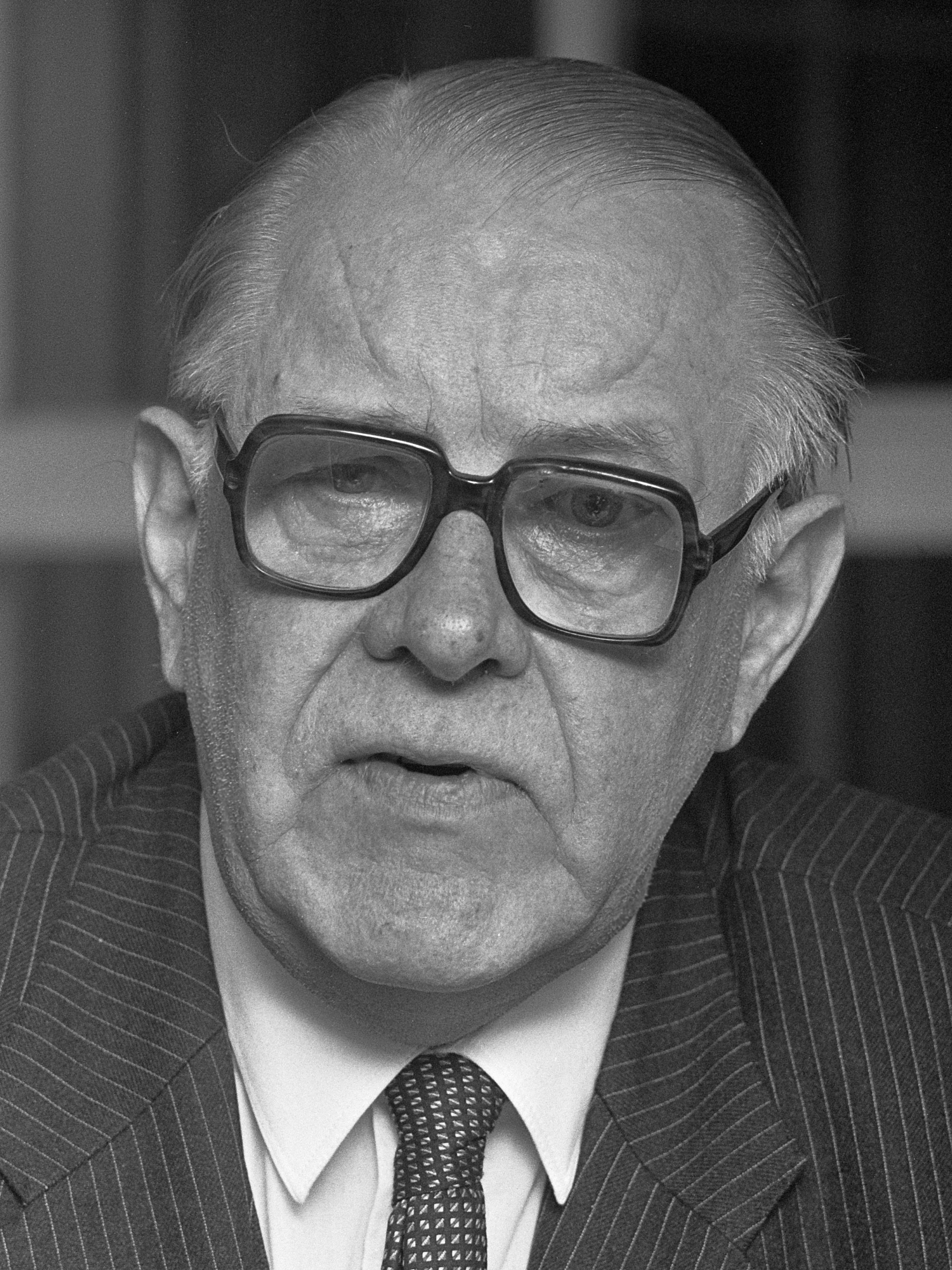
Bastiaans in 1987

Jan Bastiaans (27 May 1917 in Rotterdam - 31 October 1997 in Warmond) was a Dutch neurologist and psychiatrist, known for his controversial Bastiaans method of treatment of traumatised survivors of The Holocaust suffering from survivor guilt with LSD.

== Controversy and Meester scandal ==
Bastiaans was a scholar who acquired great fame and notoriety, but was always controversial. The "Bastiaans method" (treating traumatized adults with a concentration camp syndrome with LSD or pentothal) was supposed to make patients relive their war and Holocaust past. Bastiaans claimed to be able to cure the most severe cases in this way. According to him, sufferers of the syndrome would have developed a so-called "self-defense armor" that had to be broken through. According to him, this was possible by therapeutically administering doses of these substances. His method raised doubts when the treatment of one of his most prominent patients, Senator Eibert Meester, led to a scandal. Eibert lied – perhaps in the context of pseudologia phantastica – about a resistance past and Bastiaans did not realize that his patient was making up events. Bastiaans published a book about his patient and his resistance work, the horrific imprisonment in Germany, the neuroses and the successful therapy. Only when the book was already out did Meester’s ex-wife seek publicity with the statement that Meester had never been in the resistance and had never been a prisoner in Germany. Bastiaans was greatly embarrassed and his reputation became tainted.

== Jelgersma Clinic ==
Bastiaans was director of the Jelgersma Clinic. He was not allowed to combine this position with the management of the new Centrum 45 that he so much desired when it opened in Oegstgeest in 1973. In the documentary film Begrijpt u nu waarom ik huil? (Now Do You Get It Why I'm Crying?) by Louis van Gasteren, released in 1969, Bastiaans demonstrated his treatment method with a death camp survivor. The background was the discussion about the Breda Three, three war criminals who were to be released. From that moment on, Bastiaans was a central figure in the discussion about guilt and suffering during and after the Second World War. Bastiaans arranged a special place in health care for his patients, and thus for himself. He also mediated in applications for resistance pensions. Whenever someone questioned his methods, Bastiaans’s followers attacked the critic by claiming that he denied the suffering in the war.

== 1970s ==
During the 1970s, Bastiaans also began to apply his insights about traumas to other groups of traumatized people, including victims of torture, incest and traffic accidents. In terrorist attacks such as the train hijacking in Wijster in Drenthe and the hostage taking of the staff of the Indonesian consulate in Amsterdam by Moluccan youths, he provided the media with commentary on the events. Bastiaans published a book about this in 1979 under the title Psychologisch onderzoek naar de gevolgen van gijzelingen in Nederland (1974–1977) Psychological research into the consequences of hostage taking in the Netherlands (1974–1977). He acted as a policy advisor to the Dutch government and was a much sought-after expert on television. His work also enjoyed great interest internationally.

Bastiaans remained the center of academic and professional conflict at Leiden University during this period. Although he became increasingly isolated in the medical world, he was always supported by an intensive lobby from the former resistance and by his contacts at the Dutch court, in particular with Prince Bernhard. This made it virtually impossible for the Executive Board to impose restrictions on him, despite growing doubts about his way of working at the ministry and at the Health Inspectorate.

== 1980s ==
By the early nineteen-eighties Bastiaans had become very alienated from the academic world in general and that of medicine in particular. Within the Jelgersma Clinic he had withdrawn with a number of employees to a villa that was the annex of the clinic. His departure as director of the Jelgersma Clinic on 31 December 1982 – he had to retire because he had turned 65 – led to many problems because, despite earlier agreements, he refused to leave voluntarily, and he continued to use his villa in his capacity as professor for admissions and treatments.

=== Retirement from university ===
When the date of his retirement approached, publicity arose again and parliamentary questions were asked. Despite all objections, the resistance organizations managed to get the Lower House of the Dutch parliament to adopt a motion at the end of March 1985 that determined that Bastiaans should be able to continue his work after his departure as professor on June 1, 1985, and on June 28, 1985 he gave his farewell lecture. An investigation by the Public Health Inspectorate concluded that the methods he used were irresponsible. Because many of Bastiaans’s files were incomplete, the effectiveness of his method could not be sufficiently checked or proven in 1987.

After losing his practice and a government ban on the provision of LSD, Bastiaans retired. He was a bitter man. However, he continued to practice medicine in Oosterhout and to see patients in his home in Oegstgeest.

== Client overdose, license revoked and death ==
In 1994 a young drug-addicted German woman named Nicola K. died in his clinic after being administered ibogaine during her treatment. She had taken her last dose of heroin while on ibogaine. Bastiaans was not involved in her treatment, but the Dutch medical disciplinary board took away his medical license. He died three year later.

== Introductions ==
Bastiaans wrote introductions to various books on drugs, including Het buitenbinnen - een studie over LSD (1966), the Dutch translation of The Beyond Within: The LSD story by Sidney Cohen (1964) and Drugs by F. van Ree (1971, 1985). He also contributed to Allemaal rottigheid, allemaal verdriet - het KZ-syndroom by Willem van Salland & Wim Wennekes (1975).
