= Engelen des doods =

Angels of Death
- Engelen des Doods
- Directed by: Leo de Boer
- Release date: 1998
- Country: Netherlands

Angels of Death (original title: Engelen des Doods) is a 1998 Dutch documentary film by director Leo de Boer. During World War II, the Soviet General Andrey Vlasov was in control of the 2nd Shock Army. The documentary contains images of people studying the location near the city of Leningrad (now known as Saint Petersburg), where the 2nd Shock Army was annihilated in 1942.

== Awards ==
- Golden Calf for Best Short Documentary at the Netherlands Film Festival (1998)
