= Golden Calf for Best Long Documentary =

Dutch film award

The following is a list of winners of the Golden Calf for best Long Documentary at the NFF.

- 2026 Maasja Ooms and Willemijn Cerutti - Mijn woord tegen het mijne
- 2025 Sandra Beerends and Floor Onrust - Nesjomme
- 2024 Steve McQueen - Occupied City
- 2023 Mercedes Stalenhoef - Mijn Grote Broer
- 2022 Shamira Raphaëla - Shabu
- 2021 Els van Driel and Eefje Blankevoort - Shadow Game
- 2020 Sandra Beerends - Ze noemen me Baboe
- 2019 Claire Pijman - Living the Light - Robby Müller
- 2018 Aliona van der Horst - Liefde is aardappelen
- 2017 Petra Lataster-Czisch & Peter Lataster - De kinderen van juf Kiet
- 2016 Tom Fassaert - A Family Affair
- 2015 Morgan Knibbe - Those Who Feel the Fire Burning
- 2014 Niels van Koevorden & Sabine Lubbe Bakker - Ne me quitte pas
- 2013 Diego Gutierrez - Parts of a Family
- 2012 Marc Schmidt - De regels van Matthijs
- 2011 Petra Lataster-Czisch & Peter Lataster - Niet zonder jou
- 2010 Ditteke Mensink - Farewell
- 2009 Jan Musch & Tijs Tinbergen - Rotvos
- 2008 Coco Schrijber - Bloody Mondays & Strawberry Pies
- 2007 Jeroen Berkvens - Jimmy Rosenberg - de vader, de zoon & het talent
- 2006 Heddy Honigmann - Forever
- 2005 Rogier Kappers - Lomax the Songhunter
- 2004 Jan van den Berg - Deacon of Death
- 2003 Pieter-Rim de Kroon en Maarten de Kroon - Hollands Licht
- 2002 Pieter Fleury - Ramses
- 2001 Maria Ramos - Desi
- 2000 Heddy Honigmann - Crazy
- 1999 Chris Vos & André van der Hout - De illusie aan de macht - 1412 dagen kabinet Den Uyl
- 1998 Fatima Jebli Ouazzani - In My Father's House
- 1997 René Roelofs - Kerstmis in Floradorp
- 1996 Niek Koppen - De slag in de Javazee
- 1995 Vincent Monnikendam - Moeder Dao, de schildpadgelijkende
- 1994 Peter en Petra Lataster - Verhalen van een rivier
- 1993 Willy Lindwer - Kind in twee werelden
- 1992 Froukje Bos - Levenslied
- 1991 Johan van der Keuken - Face Value
- 1990 Joost Kraanen - Lust for Gold
- 1989 Albert van der Wildt - Beeld van een kind
- 1988 Cherry Duyns - De wording
- 1987 Rien Hagen - New York - Batavia
- 1986 Olivier Koning - Passies
- 1985 Harrie Geelen - Getekende mensen
- 1984 Olivier Koning - Terbeschikkinggesteld
- 1983 Gerrit van Elst - De kick
- 1982 Rudolf van den Berg - Sal Santen rebel
