= First Kill =

First Kill may refer to:

- First Kill (2017 film), an American film
- First Kill (compilation), a 1986 compilation album by Tygers Of Pan Tang
- First Kill (2001 film), a Dutch documentary film
- "First Kill", a song by Amon Amarth on the 2016 album Jomsviking
- "Chuck Versus the First Kill", a 2009 episode of Chuck
- First Kill (TV series), a 2022 supernatural teen drama television series
