= Fatima Jebli Ouazzani =

Moroccan film director

- Born: Meknes
- Occupation: Film director.
- Notable work: Het labyrint der lusten; Voorbij De Jaren Van Onschuld (Innocence Lost) fiction 1991; De Kleine Hélène (Little Hélène) fiction 1992 AVRO TV; (as writer & director) In het huis van mijn vader [In My Father's House], 1997 Cinema & TV; Het Was Weer Zondig (Sinned Again) 2001 IKON TV; Als Herinnering Een Moedervlek; Hier Woon Ik, Daar Leef Ik (I Live Here But My Home Is Elsewhere)

Fatima Jebli Ouazzani is a Moroccan film director.

== Life ==
Born in Meknes, Ouazzani moved to the Netherlands with her family in 1970. She left home at eighteen, and briefly studied psychology before enrolling at the Dutch Film School in Amsterdam, where she graduated with a degree in directing and scriptwriting in 1992.

In My Father's House (1997) was a feature-length documentary dealing with Ouazzani's own struggles with the patriarchal gender expectations of her Moroccan family. The film debuted at the 1998 San Francisco Film Festival, where it won the Golden Spire Award. It managed to win top prize at the 1998 Moroccan National Film Festival, despite its subject matter meaning that it received no commercial screening in Morocco, and also won the Golden Calf for Best Long Documentary at the Netherlands Film Festival and the Iris Prize Best European Documentary.

== Filmography ==
- (as assistant director) Het labyrint der lusten [Labyrinth of Lust], 1991.
- (for continuïty) (De Tranen van Maria Matchita), 1991 VPRO TV
- (as writer & director) Voorbij De Jaren Van Onschuld (Innocence Lost) fiction 1991
- (as writer & director) De Kleine Hélène (Little Hélène) fiction 1992 AVRO TV
- (as writer & director) In het huis van mijn vader [In My Father's House], 1997 Cinema & TV
- (as writer & director) Het Was Weer Zondig (Sinned Again) 2001 IKON TV
- (as writer & director) Als Herinnering Een Moedervlek 2006 VPRO TV
- (as writer & director) Hier Woon Ik, Daar Leef Ik (I Live Here But My Home Is Elsewhere) 2012 NPS TV
