= In My Father's House =

In My Father's House may refer to:

- "In My Father's House" (song), by The Blackwood Brothers, later recorded by Elvis Presley
- In My Father's House (novel), by Ernest J. Gaines
- In My Father's House (film), a Moroccan film and winner of the 1998 Golden Calf for Best Long Documentary
- In My Father's House (Ann Rinaldi novel), by Ann Rinaldi
