= 1984 Cannes Film Festival =

- Official poster of the 37th Cannes Film Festival, adapted from an original film set by Alexandre Trauner.
- Opening film: Fort Saganne
- Closing film: The Bounty
- Location: Cannes, France
- Founded: 1946
- Awards: Palme d'Or: Paris, Texas
- No. of films: 19 (In Competition)
- Festival date: 11 May 1984 – 23 May 1984
- Website: festival-cannes.com/en

Cannes Film Festival
- 1985 1983

The 37th Cannes Film Festival took place from 11 to 23 May 1984. British actor Dirk Bogarde served as jury president for the main competition.

German filmmaker Wim Wenders won the Palme d'Or, the festival's top prize, for the drama film Paris, Texas.

During this festival, a private group, under the patronage of the festival's authorities, held a side event presenting film trailers. A French jury, presided by Saul Bass, awarded its Grand Prize to the trailer for Flashdance.

The festival opened with Fort Saganne by Alain Corneau and closed with The Bounty by Roger Donaldson.

== Juries ==
=== Main competition ===
- Dirk Bogarde, British actor - Jury President
- Franco Cristaldi, Italian producer
- Michel Deville, French filmmaker
- Stanley Donen, American filmmaker and choreographer
- Istvan Dosai, Hungarian cinematographer
- Arne Hestenes, Norwegian journalist
- Isabelle Huppert, French actress
- Ennio Morricone, Italian composer and conductor
- Jorge Semprún, Spanish writer
- Vadim Yusov, Soviet cinematographer

=== Camera d'Or ===
- Bernard Jubard, French - Jury President
- Mehmet Basutcu, Turkish
- José Luis Guarner, Spanish
- Michel Jullien, French
- Samuel Lachize, French film critic
- Serge Leroy, French
- Fee Vaillant, West-German

== Official selection ==
=== In Competition ===
The following feature films competed for the Palme d'Or:

English title	Original title	Director(s)	Production country
Another Country		Marek Kanievska	United Kingdom
The Bounty (closing film)		Roger Donaldson	United Kingdom
Cal		Pat O'Connor	Ireland
Day Is Longer Than Night	დღეს ღამე უთენებია	Lana Gogoberidze	Soviet Union
Diary for My Children	Napló gyermekeimnek	Márta Mészáros	Hungary
The Element of Crime	Forbrydelsens Element	Lars von Trier	Denmark
Ghare Baire		Satyajit Ray	India
Henry IV	Enrico IV	Marco Bellocchio	Italy
The Holy Innocents	Los santos inocentes	Mario Camus	Spain
Paris, Texas		Wim Wenders	West Germany, France
The Pirate	La pirate	Jacques Doillon	France
Quilombo		Carlos Diegues	Brazil
Success Is the Best Revenge	Le succès à tout prix	Jerzy Skolimowski	France, United Kingdom
A Sunday in the Country	Un dimanche à la campagne	Bertrand Tavernier	France
This Is My Country	Bayan ko: Kapit sa patalim	Lino Brocka	Philippines
Under the Volcano		John Huston	Mexico, United States
Vigil		Vincent Ward	New Zealand
Voyage to Cythera	Ταξίδι στα Κύθηρα	Theo Angelopoulos	Greece
Where the Green Ants Dream	Wo die grünen Ameisen träumen	Werner Herzog	West Germany

=== Un Certain Regard ===
The following films were selected for the Un Certain Regard section:

English title	Original title	Director(s)	Production country
Abel Gance et son Napoléon		Nelly Kaplan	France
Andrei Tarkovsky: A Poet in the Cinema	Un poeta nel Cinema: Andreij Tarkovskij	Donatella Baglivo	Italy
The Border	De grens	Leon de Winter	Netherlands
Feroz		Manuel Gutiérrez Aragón	Spain
Le jour S...		Jean Pierre Lefebvre	Canada
Khandhar		Mrinal Sen	India
Man of Flowers		Paul Cox	Australia
A Man of Principle	Cóndores no entierran todos los días	Francisco Norden	Colombia
Maria's Day	Mária-nap	Judit Elek	Hungary
Mulleya Mulleya	여인 잔혹사 물레야 물레야	Lee Doo-yong	South Korea
El Norte		Gregory Nava	United Kingdom, United States
The Road to Bresson	De weg naar Bresson	Leo de Boer and Jurriën Rood	Netherlands
Le tartuffe		Gérard Depardieu	France
Where Is Parsifal?		Henri Helman	United Kingdom

=== Out of Competition ===
The following films were selected to be screened out of competition:

English title	Original title	Director(s)	Production country
After the Rehearsal	Efter repetitionen	Ingmar Bergman	Sweden
Beat Street		Stan Lathan	United States
Broadway Danny Rose		Woody Allen	United States
Choose Me		Alan Rudolph	United States
Fort Saganne (opening film)		Alain Corneau	France
Once Upon a Time in America	C'era una volta in America	Sergio Leone	Italy, United States

=== Short Films Competition ===
The following short films competed for the Short Film Palme d'Or:

- Ajtó by Mária Horváth
- Bottom's Dream by John Canemaker
- Le Cheval de fer by Gérald Frydman, Pierre Levie
- Orpheus and Eurydice by Lesley Keen
- Points by Dan Collins
- Ett Rum by Mats Olof Olsson
- Het Scheppen van een koe by Paul Driessen
- Le Spectacle by Gilles Chevallier
- Chiri by David Takaichvili
- Tip Top by Paul Driessen

== Parallel sections ==
=== International Critics' Week ===
The following feature films were screened for the 23rd International Critics' Week (23e Semaine de la Critique):

- Argie by Jorge Blanco (Argentina)
- Bless Their Little Hearts by Billy Woodberry (United States)
- Beyond Sorrow, Beyond Pain (Smärtgränsen) by Agneta Elers-Jarleman (Sweden)
- Boy Meets girl by Léos Carax (France)
- Dreams of the City (Ahlam el Madina) by Mohammed Malas (Syria)
- Etienne, le roi (István, a király) by Gábor Koltay (Hungary)
- White Trash (Kanakerbraut) by Uwe Schrader (West Germany)

=== Directors' Fortnight ===
The following films were screened for the 1984 Directors' Fortnight (Quinzaine des Réalizateurs):

- Atomstodin by Thorsteinn Jonsson
- The Bostonians by James Ivory
- Epílogo by Gonzalo Suarez
- Die Erben by Walter Bannert
- Everlasting Love by Michael Mak
- Ezkimo Asszony Fazik by Janos Xantus
- Flight to Berlin by Christopher Petit
- The Hit by Stephen Frears
- The House of Water (La casa de agua) by Jacobo Penzo
- Memoirs of Prison (Memórias do Cárcere) by Nelson Pereira dos Santos
- Nunca Fomos Tao Felizes by Murilo Salles
- Old Enough by Marisa Silver
- Orinoko – Nuevo Mundo by Diego Risquez
- Raffl by Christian Berger
- Revanche by Nicholas Vergitsis
- Sista Leken by Jon Lindstrom
- Stranger Than Paradise by Jim Jarmusch
- Variety by Bette Gordon
- The Years of Dreams and Revolt (Les Années de rêves) by Jean-Claude Labrecque

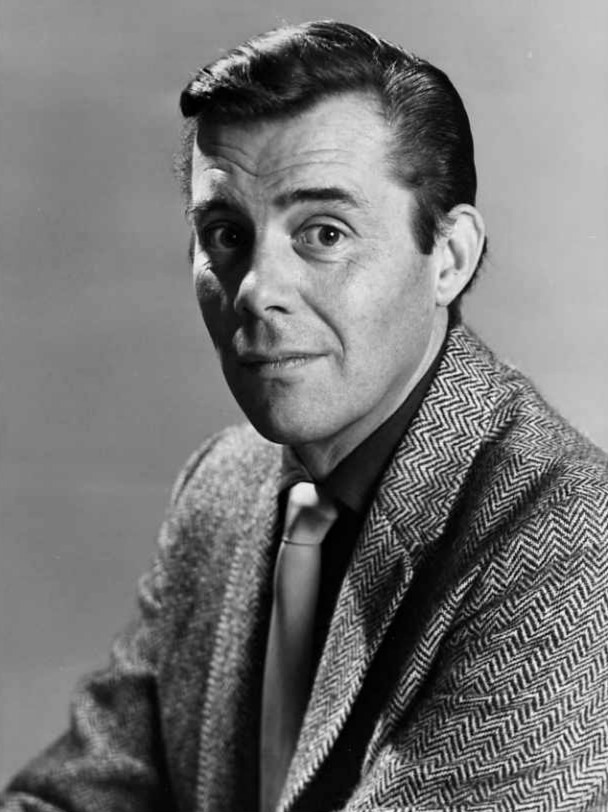
Dirk Bogarde, Jury President

== Official Awards ==
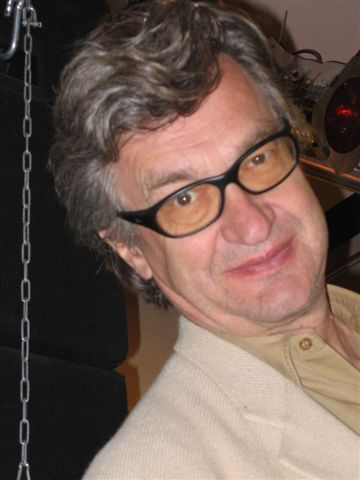
Wim Wenders, Palme d'Or winnerIn

=== In Competition ===
- Palme d'Or: Paris, Texas by Wim Wenders
- Grand Prix: Diary for My Children by Márta Mészáros
- Best Director: Bertrand Tavernier for A Sunday in the Country
- Best Screenplay: Theodoros Angelopoulos, Tonino Guerra and Thanassis Valtinos for Voyage to Cythera
- Best Actress: Helen Mirren for Cal
- Best Actor: Alfredo Landa and Francisco Rabal for The Holy Innocents
- Best Artistic Contribution: Peter Biziou (cinematographer) for Another Country

=== Caméra d'Or ===
- Stranger Than Paradise by Jim Jarmusch

=== Short Film Palme d'Or ===
- Le Cheval de fer by Gérald Frydman and Pierre Levie
- Premier Prix: Tchouma by David Takaichvili

== Independent Awards ==
=== FIPRESCI Prizes ===
- Memoirs of Prison by Nelson Pereira dos Santos (Directors' Fortnight)
- Paris, Texas by Wim Wenders (In competition)
- Voyage to Cythera by Theodoros Angelopoulos (In competition)

=== Commission Supérieure Technique ===
- Technical Grand Prize: The Element of Crime by Lars von Trier

=== Prize of the Ecumenical Jury ===
- Paris, Texas by Wim Wenders
  - Special Mention: The Holy Innocents by Mario Camus

=== Award of the Youth ===
- Foreign Film: Epilogue by Gonzalo Suárez
- French Film: Boy Meets Girl by Leos Carax
