= The Road to Bresson =

1984 film

- Directed by: Leo De Boer; Jurriën Rood
- Written by: Jurriën Rood
- Release date: May 1984
- Running time: 54 minutes
- Country: Netherlands
- Languages: Dutch, French, English

The Road to Bresson (Dutch: De weg naar Bresson) is a 1984 Dutch documentary film directed by Leo De Boer and Jurriën Rood. It was screened in the Un Certain Regard section at the 1984 Cannes Film Festival.

== Cast ==
- Robert Bresson as himself
- Louis Malle as himself
- Dominique Sanda as herself
- Paul Schrader as himself
- Andrei Tarkovsky as himself
- Orson Welles as himself

== See also ==
- Orson Welles filmography
