= Snežana Nikšić =

Serbian actress (1943–2022)

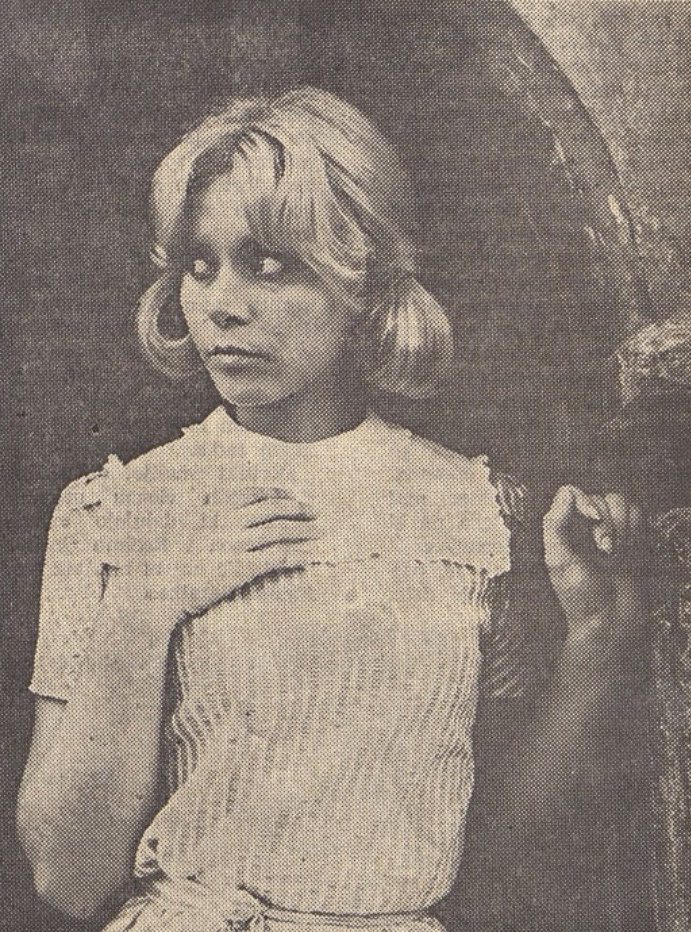
Image of Snežana Nikšić

Snežana Nikšić (Serbian Cyrillic: Снежана Никшић, 30 November 1943 – 2 April 2022) was a Serbian film and television actress. She was born in Niš, part of German-occupied Serbia.

She was married to Ljuba Tadić.

== Selected filmography ==
- 1962 – Siberian Lady Macbeth
- 1967 – Volite se ljudi (TV series)
- 1968 – Sačulatac (TV series)
- 1968-1969 – TV Bukvar (TV series)
- 1969 – Bura (TV movie)
- 1978 – The Tiger
- 1980 – Majstori, majstori (All that Jack's)
- 1985 – Poetesa (TV movie)
- 1988-1991 – Bolji život (TV series)
- 1989 – Bunker Palace Hôtel
- 1991 – The Serbian Girl
- 1993 – Ruski car (TV movie)
- 1994 – Life and Literature - Danilo Kis (TV short)
- 1996 – To se samo svici igraju (TV mini-series)
- 2007 – The Reject
- 2012 – Nema Aviona Za Zagreb
