= Al-Nakba: The Palestinian Catastrophe 1948 =

- Directed by: Benny Brunner and Alexandra Jansse
- Written by: Benny Morris, Benny Brunner, Alexandra Jansse, Joseph Rochlitz
- Based on: The Birth of the Palestinian Refugee Problem, 1947–1949 by Benny Morris
- Produced by: Benny Brunner and Alexandra Jansse
- Starring: Azmi Bishara, Shaban Muhmoud, Itzhak Pundak, Benny Morris
- Narrated by: Joseph Rochlitz
- Cinematography: Ram Lee-Tal
- Edited by: Joseph Rochlitz
- Music by: Elizabeth & Ilya Magnes
- Production company: Arte
- Distributed by: Arab Film Distribution, Landmark Media Enterprises
- Release date: 1997
- Running time: 58 minutes
- Country: Netherlands
- Languages: English, Arabic, Hebrew

Al-Nakba: The Palestinian Catastrophe 1948 is a documentary film of Benny Brunner and Alexandra Jansse. It follows the events that surround the 1948 Palestinian expulsion and flight. It was filmed in 1996, is 58 minutes long and is in English. Based on the book The Birth of the Palestinian Refugee Problem, 1947–1949 by Benny Morris, it is the first documentary film to examine the displacement of 750,000 Palestinians during the birth of the state of Israel. The film shifts between interviews with Palestinian refugees and the reactions of Irgun and Haganah soldiers who witnessed and participated in the events of 1948.

== Subject and treatment ==
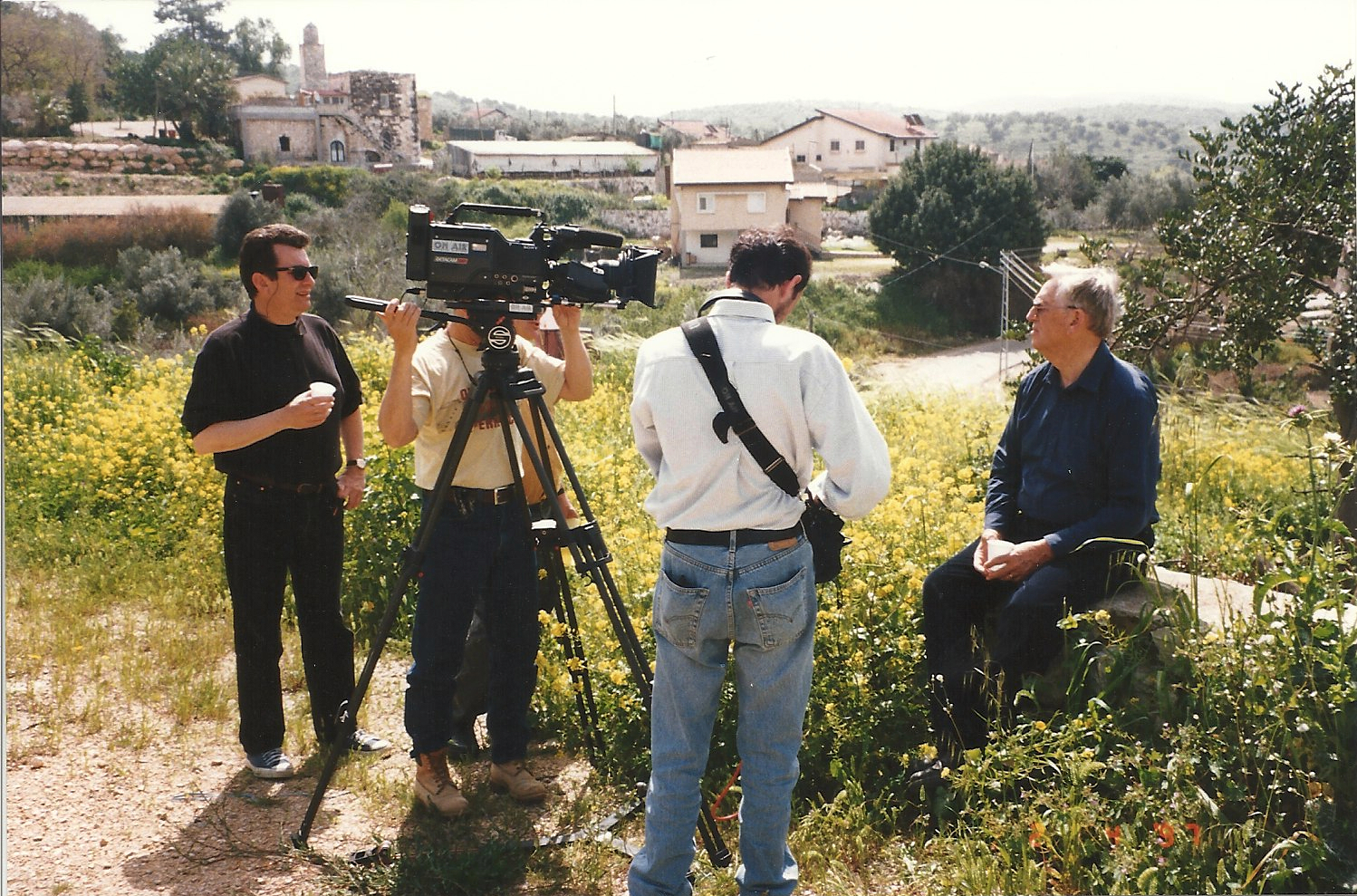
Brunner interviews Mordechai Bar-On in Az-Zakariyya

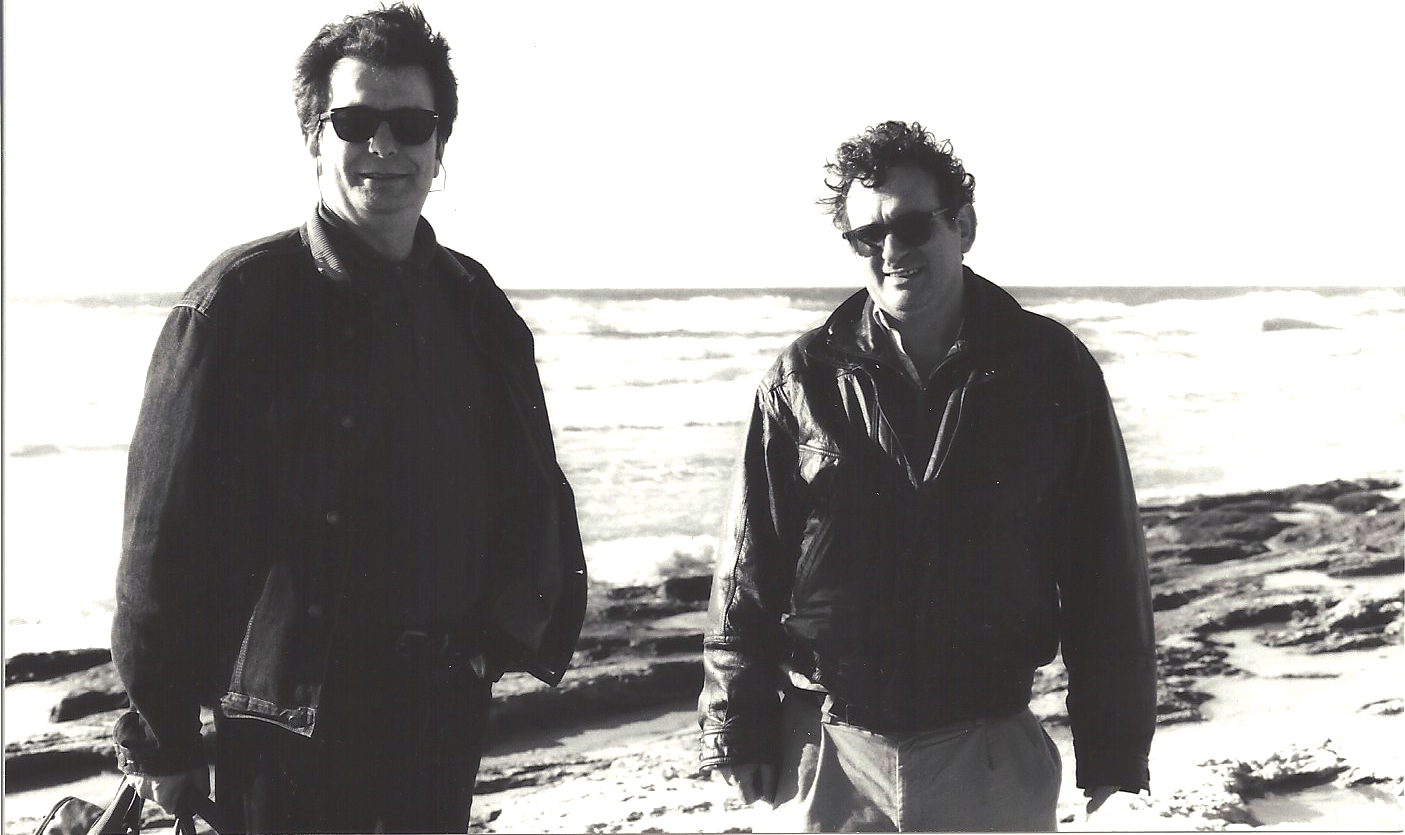
Benny Brunner and historian Benny Morris

Brunner has stated he was inspired to tell the story in Al-Nakba in 1988 after reading The Birth of the Palestinian Refugee Problem, 1947–1949 by Benny Morris. He deemed it a "watershed moment" for challenging his view of Zionism after coming to believe that some Palestinians were expelled and that Arab leaders had not told the Palestinians to leave. He began to wonder how many Palestinians were expelled. He then decided to turn the book into a film as he had with other texts. Said Brunner, "Every film has its own time limit and so I made my choices. I wouldn’t change anything in the film."

"We wanted to have lots of information in the film and not to make an emotional film," co-director Alexandra Jansse said later in an interview. "But the movie was brought to a higher level by adding the Palestinian poetry. We wanted to add that emotional level of the Palestinians who are broken up in their hearts and you can see it in their eyes."

Benny Morris participated in the film despite Brunner's differing conclusions and methodology.

== Premieres ==
The film first premiered in Brunner's hometown of Amsterdam, and after it was broadcast in central and western Europe, he toured with the film in Israel with question and answer sessions to invite discussion of the topic. In Israel, the film was shown in Tel Aviv.

The San Francisco Jewish Film Festival screened the film in 1998 at the Castro Theater. Jweekly reviewed the film as "the most controversial film in this year's festival" owing to its release coinciding with Israel's semicentennial. "The film stayed close to what can be asserted as fact, either by archival evidence or first-person accounts", the commentary stated.

== Reactions ==
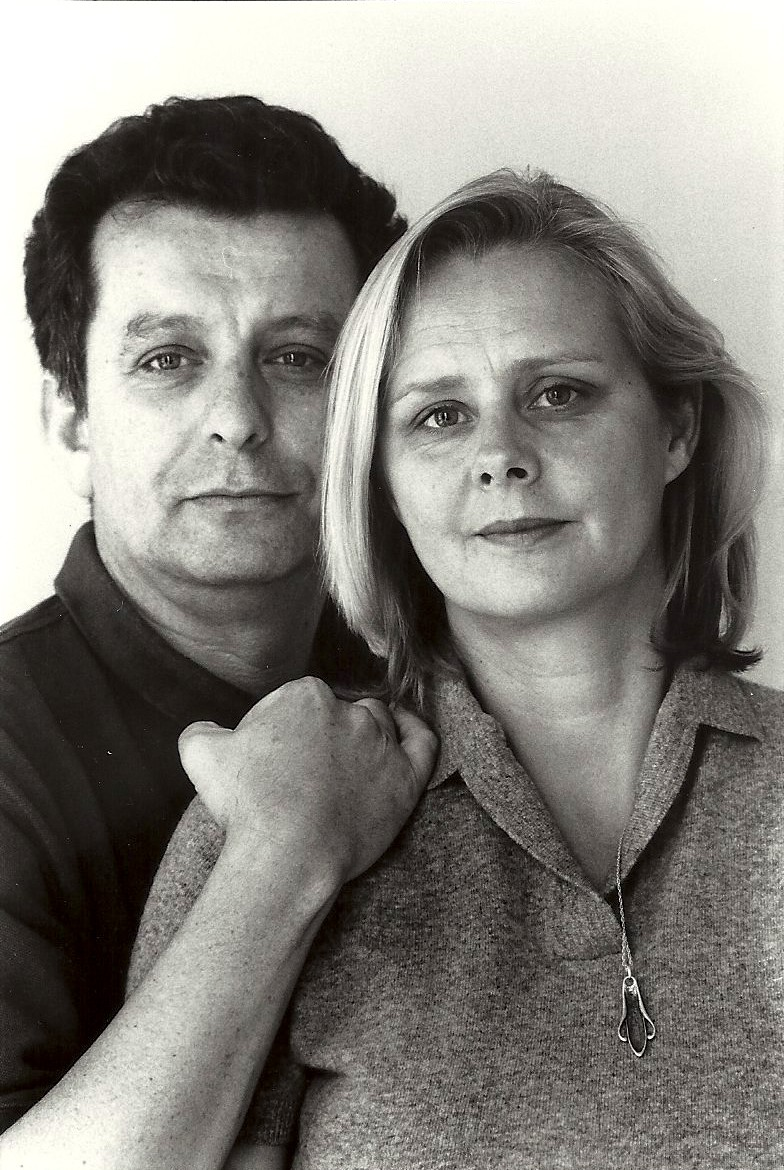
Directors Brunner and Jansse

Israeli historian Tom Segev praised Al-Nakba for acknowledging the complexities surrounding the expulsion of Palestinians during the creation of Israel and urging that Israelis accept some responsibility for what happened. A reviewer for Jama'a, a journal for the Department of Middle East Studies at Ben Gurion University stated the film lacked objectivity and was historically superficial. Brunner later confirmed his intent was not objectivity, which he views as an impossible goal, and that his sympathies are completely with the Palestinian side. He remained convinced, however, that his depiction was closer to the truth than the narrative being told from a Zionist view.

=== Vienna ===
The film's selection by the Vienna Jewish Film Festival was seen as controversial by the conservative Vienna Israelite Community.

=== Tel Aviv ===
The movie screened on March 7, 1998, at the Tel Aviv Cinematheque. Benny Brunner stated that former Tel Aviv mayor Shlomo Lahat walked out of the question and answer session. According to Brunner, "He seemed pissed off." In subsequent screenings in Tel Aviv, however, Brunner stated that Palestinians from Jaffa had criticized the film for leaving out particular events.

=== San Francisco ===
The San Francisco Jewish Film Festival praised the film for its "authority" and "sensitivity" in its treatment of a controversial subject. According to Jweekly, the film was preceded with long lines of people, some of them passing out flyers from a variety of political leanings. The article asserted that the film was the most controversial of the festival's entries. Jweekly noted the presence of police on hand and depicted the reaction afterward as a "fiery political exchange" moderated by Brunner, Jansse and David Biale, professor of Jewish history at the Graduate Theological Union. Though each question received its share of "cheers and hisses," the questions stayed on topic. Afterward, Brunner complimented participants for their "political maturity".

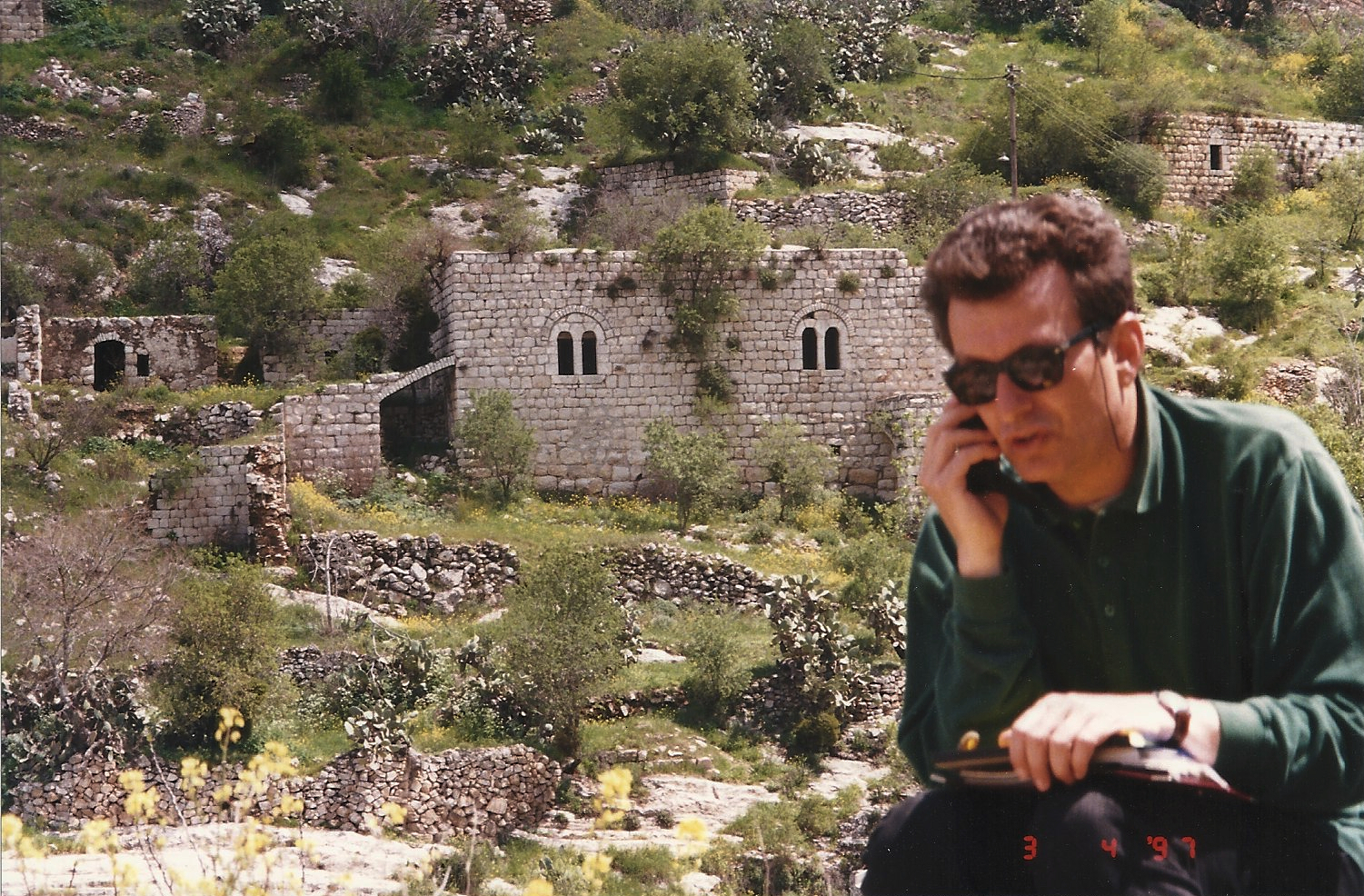
Brunner in Lifta during production
