= Isis Fashion Awards =

Dutch fashion competition focused on accessories

The Isis Fashion Awards (IFA) is a fashion competition focusing on fashion accessories that is held in the Netherlands annually. The event was founded by filmmaker and awards director Jan-Willem Breure.

== History ==
The Isis Fashion Awards was founded by Jan-Willem Breure. The first Isis Fashion Awards event was held on 10 December 2022, in Amsterdam, the Netherlands

== Format ==
The Isis Fashion Awards is organized as a runway competition specifically focusing on accessory designs. The competition has included a range of accessory categories, including footwear, bags, eyewear, jewelry, watches, gloves, scarves, belts, hats and masks.

The 2024 edition was held on 1 June at Diamond Plaza in Rotterdam, where Goudleeratelier Van Soest won the award for best accessory designer. The runway presentations were followed by comments from the judging panel, which included singer Patricia Paay, boxer Regilio Tuur, Maik de Boer, Carolien Ter Linden, and Maureen Powel.

The edition included designers such as ANNIGJE Tassen, Vanihila, CinemAromatique, Obiaocha Design, CUVALAY, Deniz Terli, Suzan Studio and Goudleeratelier Van Soest. The 2025 edition judging panel included Donnalyn Bartolome, Autumn Noel, Carolien Ter Linden, Carolyn Collinda, Marlon Claessen and Halimalove Mbawa. Participants included De Parme Design, MerryMarian, Patience & Ambition, Quattuor Gemmis, Suzan Studio, AL+ER by Sanghee Moon, Waza is Back, Goudleeratelier Van Soest, VoyeurX, Accessoires by Criola, ANNIGJE, Abebe K Art and Odinski Jewels.

De Parme Design by Princess Margarita de Bourbon de Parme,was the first-place winner, followed by MerryMarian in second place and Patience & Ambition in third place. The fourth edition of the awards was held on 6 May 2026 at De Koning Party & Events in Amsterdam. The program was broadcast on SALTO2 on 25 June 2026.

== Media coverage ==
The Isis Fashion Awards has been documented from 2022 through television programming on SALTO, the public broadcaster serving Amsterdam. The event has also received coverage in Playboy Nederland about the participation of VoyeurX in the 2025 competition.
