= Benny Brunner =

Israeli-Dutch filmmaker

- בני ברונר
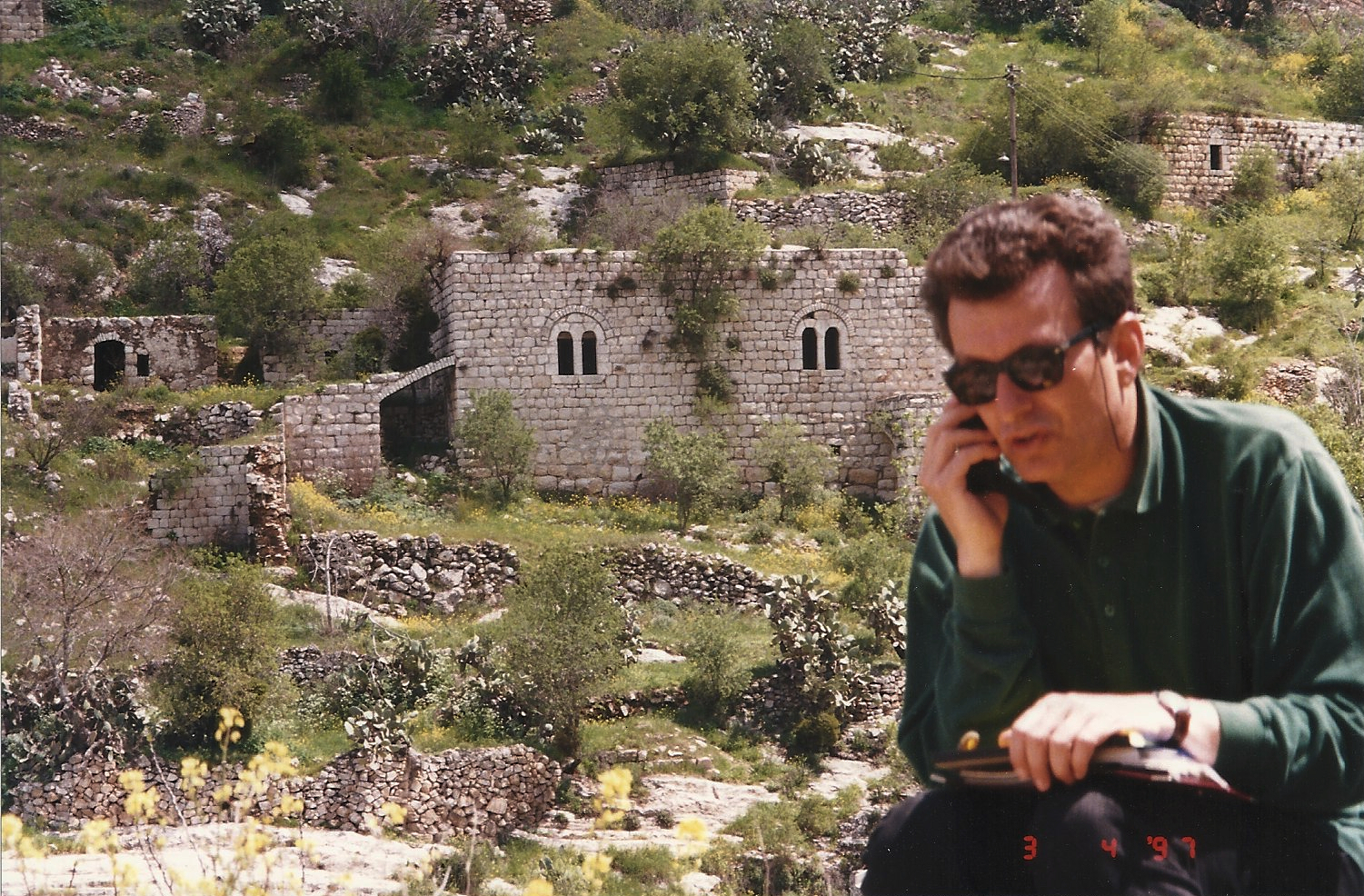
- Benny Brunner in Lifta during filming of Al-Nakba: The Palestinian Catastrophe 1948
- Born: 1954 (age 71–72); Bârlad, Romania
- Occupation: filmmaker
- Notable work: Al-Nakba: The Palestinian Catastrophe 1948, The Great Book Robbery
- Style: documentary film
- Parent(s): Clara Brunner (1929-2021); Morris Brunner (1927-1976)

Benny Brunner (Hebrew: בני ברונר; born 1954) is an Israeli-Dutch filmmaker, born in Bârlad, Romania and based in Amsterdam since 1986. He studied film at Tel Aviv University. Since the late 1980s, Brunner has written, directed and produced films about the history of the Israeli-Palestinian conflict including The Concrete Curtain, It Is No Dream, Al-Nakba and The Great Book Robbery, films about Jewish history like The Seventh Million, and films concerning the modern history of the Middle East. He describes himself as "a veteran leftist" and his political films take the side of the 'other'. Brunner has worked in the Middle East, Europe, South Africa, and the United States. In addition to winning a special commendation by the Prix Europa for A Philosopher for All Seasons in 1991, his films have been screened at the San Francisco Jewish Film Festival, the International Documentary Film Festival Amsterdam, the Jerusalem Film Festival, the San Diego Jewish Film Festival, and numerous international, human rights and Jewish film festivals.

== Early life ==
Born in Romania, Benny Brunner immigrated to Israel at age five. According to Guernica Magazine, Brunner's early memories include political shouting matches between his father and uncle. He was raised by socialist parents who supported David Ben-Gurion, the first Prime Minister of Israel. While in Beer Sheva, he was a Labour supporter. The San Francisco Jewish Film Festival has stated that Brunner's mother, Clara, wanted him to study law, but he was 'too smart for his own good', and thought that being a filmmaker would be lucrative and provide him an opportunity to travel. Brunner studied film at Tel Aviv University at the Ramat Aviv campus in the Katz Faculty of the Arts' Department of Film and Television. Brunner served in the Israel Defense Forces and is a veteran of the Yom Kippur War, during which he began to view the Israeli narrative he had learned in school as "legends of nation building." The change in his view of Zionism was at first difficult for his family to accept.

== Career ==
Brunner left Israel in 1986 for an opportunity to make political films. He briefly stayed in London where he did freelance work during the Thatcher era. Brunner moved to the Netherlands later that year.

=== A Philosopher for All Seasons (1990) ===
Brunner's most significant early work is a tribute to then-living Yeshayahu Leibowitz. It explores in particular the impact of Leibowitz's answer to the question of how one may determine who is Jewish. The film won a Taurus trophy for special commendation in Non-Fiction at the Prix Europa in 1991.

=== The Seventh Million (1995) ===
Based on historian Tom Segev's book of the same name, The Seventh Million explores the dilemma of Shoah survivors in finding a place in the newly established State of Israel. The film was initially considered too controversial to be aired on Israeli state television. Brunner collaborated with the historian to find images to accompany the text. He researched archives and propaganda footage. In reaction to Steven Spielberg's Schindler's List, Brunner resolved to make a movie which was descriptive rather than dramatic. The film shows how Holocaust survivors reacted to their treatment in Israeli society by hiding tattoos received in Nazi concentration camps and responding with depression and resentment. The title and narrative are meant to portray the lasting effects of the Holocaust on modern Israeli life.

=== Al-Nakba: The Palestinian Catastrophe 1948 (1996) ===
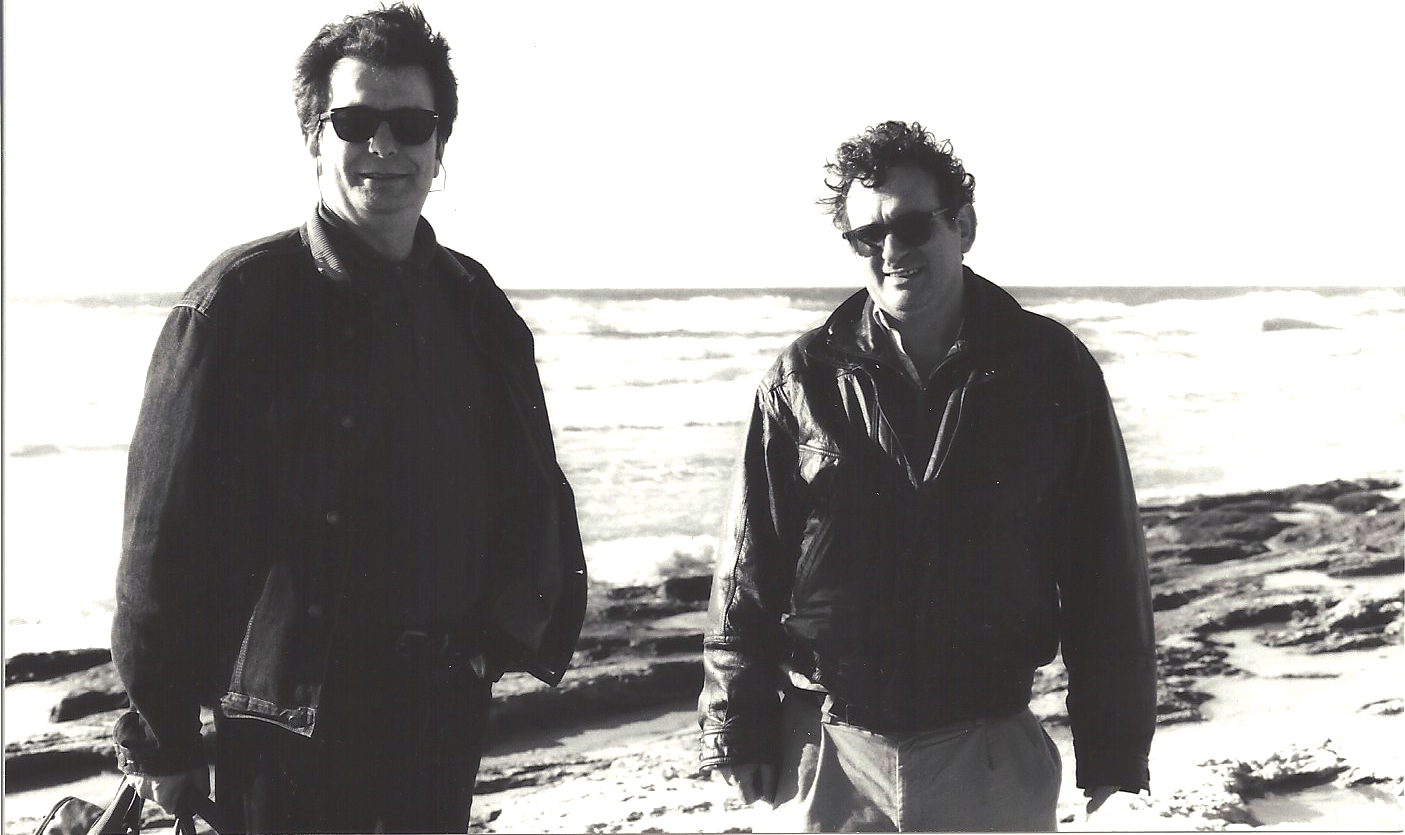
Benny Brunner and historian Benny Morris during filming of Al-Nakba

Brunner describes a "watershed moment" he experienced in 1988 after reading The Birth of the Palestinian Refugee Problem, 1947-1949 by Benny Morris, whereupon he envisioned making the book into a film. This was the impetus for his conception of Al-Nakba: The Palestinian Catastrophe 1948, the first documentary film to examine the displacement of 750,000 Palestinians during the birth of the state of Israel. Brunner toured with Al-Nakba to discuss the subject with audiences in Israel and San Francisco.

=== The Concrete Curtain (2004) ===
The film follows his own film The Wall (2003) as further documentation of the West Bank wall and the difficulties imposed upon Palestinians. Variety noted the film for its Kafkaesque absurdism and dark humor.

=== The Great Book Robbery (2011) ===
While shooting State of Suspension in 2008, Brunner stated that he read Salvage or Plunder? Israel's "Collection" of Private Palestinian Libraries in West Jerusalem by Gish Amit. He was "stunned" at the appropriation of 70,000 books by the State of Israel during the 1948 Palestinian expulsion and flight as significant to the loss of Palestinian cultural heritage and decided to make a film on the topic. About 6,000 of these books continue to be held today at National Library of Israel where they are labeled as "Abandoned Property".

== Views ==
Brunner self-describes as a former Zionist who sympathizes with the Palestinian people. According to Guernica, Israeli Cabinet Minister Uzi Landau accused him of "being part of an Israeli left fanning the flames of 'Jew-hatred' in Europe." Ginger Foot Films has stated that Brunner "does not believe in neutrality, balance or objectivity in documentary filmmaking, especially when state power is used to dominate the occupied, underprivileged, or the 'other'."

== Personal life ==
Brunner still visits the Middle East two to three times a year. Guernica said his visits are a source of creative inspiration.

== Filmography ==
Release Year	Film	Credits				Reference
Release Year	Film	Director	Writer	Producer	Other	Reference
1990	Romania, The Taming of the Intellectuals	Yes				
1991	A Philosopher For All Seasons	Yes				
1992	Cauchemar	Yes				
1995	The Seventh Million	Yes		Yes		
1996	The Avengers	Yes				
1997	Al-Nakba	Yes	Yes	Yes		
2000	Blood Money	Yes		Yes		
2001	Kosher Friendly	Yes		Yes		
2002	It is No Dream	Yes		Yes		
2002	The Children of Abraham and Sophie	Yes		Yes		
2003	The Lobby	Yes				
2003	The Wall	Yes		Yes		
2005	The Concrete Curtain	Yes		Yes		
2009	State of Suspension	Yes			DP	
2012	The Great Book Robbery	Yes				
2014	The Érpatak Model	Yes		Yes	DP	
2015	The Hannibal Directive	Yes	Yes	Yes		
