= The Price of Survival =

- Directed by: Louis van Gasteren
- Written by: Louis van Gasteren
- Produced by: Louis van Gasteren
- Cinematography: Gregor Meerman
- Production company: Euro Television Productions
- Distributed by: Spectrum Film
- Release date: 2003
- Running time: 56 minutes
- Country: Netherlands
- Language: Dutch

The Price Of Survival (De prijs van overleven) is a 2003 documentary film by Dutch director Louis van Gasteren and a sequel to Now Do You Get It Why I'm Crying? (Begrijpt U Nu Waarom Ik Huil?).

The documentary is about the impact of post-traumatic stress syndrome on the family of a Nazi concentration camp survivor named Joop. Joop cannot forget his experiences in a concentration camp during World War II and these emotions are transferred to his wife Dina and their three children. The eldest son and daughter have long since lost contact with their parents and respond in the documentary only by letter. The youngest son Reinier, together with his wife Hadelinde, stayed in contact with his parents. Joop died in 2000, yet the camp experiences are seemingly 'inherited,' as Joop's descendants continue to pay the emotional price of his survival. The Price Of Survival won the Golden Calf for Best Short Documentary at the 2003 Netherlands Film Festival. 56 minutes. Color.
