= Grenzeloze Liefde – Made in Japan =

Love Beyond Frontiers – Made in Japan
- Grenzeloze liefde
- Directed by: Puck de Leeuw
- Release date: 1996
- Running time: 90 minutes
- Country: Netherlands
- Language: Dutch

Love beyond frontiers – Made in Japan (original title: 'Grenzeloze liefde - Made in Japan') is a 1996 Dutch documentary film by the director Puck de Leeuw. The documentary tells the story of two Dutch women and one Flemish woman, living in Japan with their Japanese husbands and coping with their new way of life. The documentary is part 1 of the series 'Love beyond frontiers'. The other documentary film in this series is part 2, 'Love beyond frontiers; made in Africa'. Part 3, 'Love beyond frontiers; made in USA' was never made.

== Awards ==
- IDFA Zapper award (1996)
