= Now Do You Get It Why I'm Crying? =

- Directed by: Louis van Gasteren
- Written by: Louis van Gasteren
- Produced by: Louis van Gasteren; Joke Meerman
- Cinematography: Jan de Bont; Peter Bos; Jos van Schoor
- Edited by: Rolf Orthel; Jan Bostriesz; Huib Duyster; Bato Bachman
- Production company: Spectrum Film
- Release date: 1969
- Running time: 62 min.
- Country: Netherlands
- Languages: Dutch, German

Now Do You Get It Why I'm Crying? (Begrijpt U Nu Waarom Ik Huil?) is a 1969 documentary film by Dutch director Louis van Gasteren. The film focuses mainly on the personality of Joop, a traumatised survivor of concentration camps.

== Background and content ==
In the late 1960s, Van Gasteren was drawn to the work of the Leiden University professor Jan Bastiaans treating traumatized war survivors. Gasteren was concerned about the psychotherapeutic treatment with LSD on a former concentration camp prisoner in Bastiaans' clinic. The patient focused on was named Joop. Joop was arrested by the Nazis in September 1941 and underwent a long journey through hell among different camps until he was liberated by the Russians in 1945. Joop returned home to his wife a different man. He had nightmares, and was incapable of ordinary human contact. With two cameras, Gasteren shot about six and a half hours of the first treatment Joop underwent at Bastiaans. Particular attention is paid to details: Joop's hands, the sweat on his forehead, a tear running down his cheek slowly. From this, Gasteren edited more than one hour of film that made a big impression at release and even led to questions in Parliament. 16 mm, b/w, 62 minutes.

== Sequel ==
In 2003 Van Gasteren directed a sequel, The Price of Survival, about Joop's surviving family and their own continued suffering after his death in 2000. 62 min, 35mm.
