= Hans: Het Leven Voor De Dood =

Hans: Het Leven voor de dood Hans, Life Before Death
- Original film poster
- Directed by: Louis van Gasteren
- Written by: Louis van Gasteren
- Cinematography: Jos van Schoor; Paul van den Bos; Fred van Kuyk
- Production company: Spectrum Film
- Release date: 1983
- Running time: 155 minutes
- Country: Netherlands
- Language: Dutch

Hans: Het Leven voor de dood (Hans, Life Before Death) is a 1983 Dutch documentary feature film by Louis van Gasteren about the life of the young composer Hans van Sweeden (1939-1963) and those who knew him intimately. The film deals intimately with the children of the Nazis. It won the Golden Calf for Best Feature Film in 1983. Award of the Dutch film critics, 1983; the Belgian film critics Award, 1984; Best Dutch Documentary 1980–1990. 35 mm, b/w & color, 155 min.

The film is about the life of the musician, poet and actor Hans van Sweeden (1939-1963), who ended his life at the age of 24, as well as his contemporaries in the turbulent fifties and sixties. Louis van Gasteren received a Golden Calf.
