= Birthplace Unknown =

- Directed by: Karin Junger
- Cinematography: Peter Brugman
- Edited by: Leo de Boer
- Production company: Jura Filmprodukties
- Release date: 1988
- Country: Netherlands

Birthplace Unknown is a 1988 Dutch documentary film by director Karin Junger, featuring two South-Korean girls who were adopted by a Dutch family. The director follows the two young women as they visit South Korea, their country of birth.

== Awards ==
- VPRO IDFA Award for Best Feature-Length Documentary (1988)
