= Leo de Boer =

Dutch film director (born 1953)

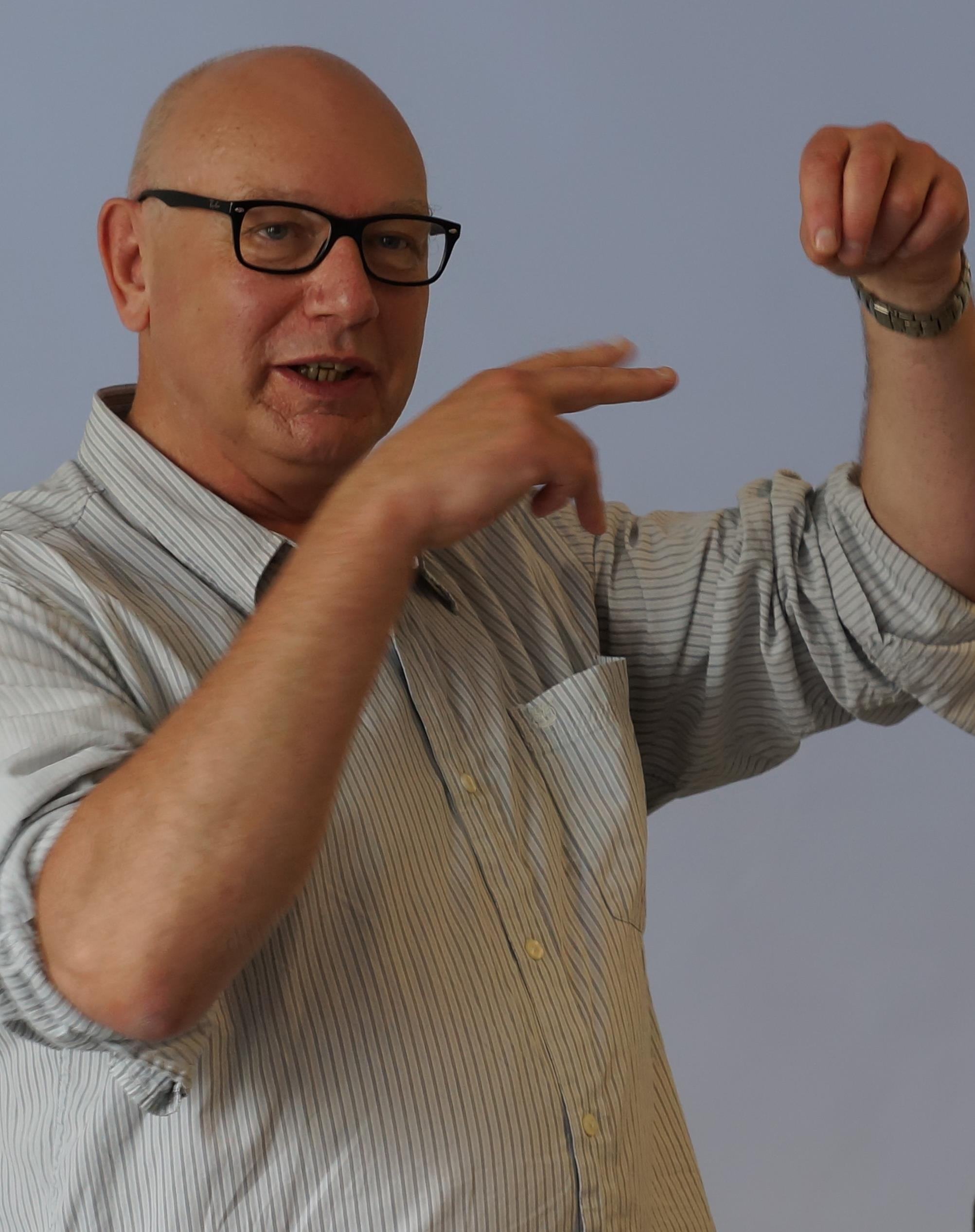
- De Boer in 2013
- Born: 3 January 1953 (age 72); Amstelveen, Netherlands
- Known for: art, film

Leo de Boer (born 1953) is a Dutch film director. He is also a lecturer at Utrecht School of the Arts in Utrecht, the Netherlands.

== Education and Career ==
De Boer studied history at the University of Amsterdam followed by four years at the Dutch Film Academy. He has worked as film editor at NOS Dutch National Television, and is a lecturer at the Utrecht School of the Arts (HKU). He has done documentary screenplay coaching at the International Documentary Film Festival Amsterdam workshop for docu-development.

He is the screenwriter and director of several documentaries and feature films. His work includes TV-documentaries like The Road to Bresson, Angels of Death (awarded the 'Golden Calf' as the best documentary at the Dutch Film Festival), Under Moscow, The Train to Grozny and feature-length documentaries like The Red Stuff and Closing in on Tanja.

== List of documentary films ==
- Roes (2019)
- Boudewijn Büch, verdwaald tussen feit en fictie (2016)
- Paradijs in Moskou (2014)
- Circushart (2012)
- Ik wil mijn geld terug (2012)
- Helene, een vrouw tussen liefde en kunst (2011)
- Dichter bij Tanja (2010)
- Bikkel (2009)
- De rode jaren (2005)
- Onder Moskou (2001)
- De trein naar Grozny (2000)
- The red stuff (1999)
- Dromen in Oktober (1999)
- Engelen des doods (1997)
- De Ruslui (1996)
- Op het Noorden (1994)
- For Anne Lovett 1968–1984 (1987)
- In de ban van sirenen (1978)

Freelance film editing on documentary films:

- Birthplace Unknown (1988) by director Karin Junger
- Procedure 769, witness to an execution (1995) by director Jaap van Hoewijk
