= First Kill (2001 film) =

2001 Dutch documentary film

- Directed by: Coco Schrijber
- Production company: Lemming Film
- Release date: 2001
- Running time: 55 minutes
- Country: Netherlands
- Language: English

First Kill is a 2001 Dutch documentary film that revolves around the psychology of war. Important turning points in the Vietnam War are used to illustrate the effect of war on body and mind. The documentary consists of interviews with Michael Herr and several Vietnam veterans. The depth of the interviews provides insight into the feelings that accompany violence, fear, hate, seduction and pleasure.

First Kill was directed by Coco Schrijber and produced by Lemming Film.
