= Faja Lobbi =

1960 film

- Directed by: Herman van der Horst
- Release date: 1960
- Running time: 70 minutes
- Country: Netherlands
- Language: Dutch

Faja Lobbi is a 1960 Dutch-Surinamese award-winning documentary film, directed by Herman van der Horst. Its alternative titles include Fiery Love en Symphony of the Tropics and it was shown at the Film Festivals in Berlin and Adelaide.
