= Gerard Jacobs =

Dutch writer and journalist

Gerard Jacobs (born 1953) is a Dutch writer and journalist. For many years he worked as a correspondent for De Volkskrant and for radio and TV in the Middle East, Africa, and other places. Between 1986 and 2005 he travelled as a reporter across Siberia and witnessed the collapse of the Soviet Union. He has published five travelogue books.

Two of the books were made into documentaries.

The documentary Gold: Forgotten in Siberia (1994), based on the book Goudkoorts received a Special Mention at the 1995 Festival International de Programmes Audiovisuels.

The documentary Stalin had een brug beloofd (Stalin Promised a Bridge) won the Grand Prize (Golden Calf) at the 10th Netherlands Film Festival (1996) in the category "Best Short Documentary.

== Books ==
- 1992: Reis Naar De Rand Van De Wereld (Journey To The Edge Of The World), Contact publishing house, ISBN 9025400612 .
- 1993: Goudkoorts / Siberische verhalen (Gold Rush / Siberian Stories), Contact, ISBN 9025403573 .
- 1996: Aan de andere kant van de heuvel (On the Other Side of the Hill), Contact, ISBN 9025407102 .
- 2002: De sterksten zullen overleven:: reizen door Indonesië in het voetspoor van Joseph Conrad en Alfred Wallace (The Strong Will Survive: traveling through Indonesia in the footsteps of Joseph Conrad and Alfred Wallace), Contact, ISBN 9025406564
- 2003: De goden hebben honger (The Gods are Hungry), Contact, ISBN 9025419356 .
  - It includes stories from the first two travelogues about Siberia and some new travels, as well as a DVD with Stalin had een brug beloofd.
