= Deacon of Death =

2004 film

- Directed by: Jan van den Berg and Willem van de Put
- Production company: DRS Films
- Release date: 2004
- Running time: 65 minutes
- Country: Netherlands

Deacon of Death is a 2004 Dutch documentary film by film director Jan van den Berg and Willem van de Put and was produced by DRS Films. The film introduces Sok Chea, a victim of the Khmer Rouge in Cambodia in the 70s, as she confronts Karoby, the man she remembers killing her family and others in their village when she was a child. Karoby has never been brought to trial and still lives in the village where the atrocities took place.

In 2004, the film had a fairly successful theatrical release and won the Golden Calf for best long documentary.
