= Shamira Raphaela =

Aruban–Dutch filmmaker

Shamira Raphaëla
- Born: Shamira Raphaëla; 1982 (age 43–44)
- Education: Gerrit Rietveld Academie; ArtEZ University of Arts
- Occupations: Director, writer
- Years active: 2005–present
- Website: https://www.shamiraraphaela.com

Shamira Raphaëla (born 1982) is an Aruban–Dutch filmmaker. She is best known as the director of documentaries Daddy and the Warlord, Deal With It and Our Motherland.

== Personal life ==
She was born in 1982 in the Caribbean and grew up in Aruba to a Dutch mother and a Curaçao father.

== Career ==
After voorbereidend wetenschappelijk onderwijs (VWO), she moved to the Netherlands and studied fine arts at the Gerrit Rietveld Academie. Later she obtained a degree in media art from the ArtEZ University of Arts. Initially, she started to work as an independent director where she directed several television programs: Expeditie Robinson and Spuiten en Slikken.

In 2006, Raphaela produced and directed her maiden short film With Salt In My Eyes. The short deals about three young Aruban women. After the success of several shorts, she made her first feature documentary Deal With It. The film received critical acclaim and later awarded at the Los Angeles Urban Film Festival, the Belize International Film Festival and the Aruba International Film Festival. The film revolves around the story of two drug dealers and addicts: father Pempy and brother Andy, actually her family members. The film was nominated for best Debut at the Netherlands Film Festival (NFF) 2015. In 2017, the film was awarded with the Lenno and the Sunfish the International Documentary Film Festival Amsterdam (IDFA) prize for the Best Youth Documentary.

In 2017, she wrote the film Downfall of a Superwoman where she won the Karen de Bok Talent Award during IDFA, 2018. In the same year, she made Lenno and the Angelfish. The film received critical acclaim and won the Award for Best European Children's Documentary during the Berlin International Film Festival in 2019 and then received the Award for Best Children's Documentary at IDFA, 2018.

In 2018, she made the biographical documentary Daddy and the Warlord which revolves around the story of journalist Clarice Gargard's father, who had been the right-hand man of Charles Taylor, the ex-president of Liberia. The film had its premiere at the Movies that Matter film festival in 2019. Later, the film won a Golden Calf for Best Short Documentary at the Dutch Film Festival 2019. In December 2019, she made the documentary Ons Motherland.

== Filmography ==
Year	Film	Role	Genre	Ref.
2010	Serious Request	segment director	TV special	
2010	Spuiten en Slikken	Director	TV series documentary	
2012	Vier handen op één buik	Director	TV series	
2013	Welkom bij de Kamara's	Director	TV series	
2014	Chantal blijft slapen	Director	TV series	
2014	Deal with it	Director, writer	Documentary	
2016	Expeditie Robinson	Director	TV series	
2017	Lenno and the Angelfish	Director, writer	Documentary short	
2019	Daddy and the Warlord	Director, writer	TV movie documentary	
2019	Our Motherland	Director, writer	Documentary	
TBD	Downfall of a Superwoman	Director, writer	Documentary	
TBD	De Peperklip	Director, writer	Documentary	
