= Inhuldiging Koningin Wilhelmina te Amsterdam =

The Inauguration of Queen Wilhelmina in Amsterdam
- Inhuldiging Koningin Wilhelmina te Amsterdam
- Directed by: F.A. Nöggerath snr.
- Produced by: F.A. Nöggerath snr.
- Starring: Wilhelmina of the Netherlands
- Cinematography: William Dixon
- Distributed by: Filmfabriek F.A. Nöggerath
- Release date: September 11, 1898
- Running time: 6 minutes
- Country: The Netherlands
- Language: Silent

The Inauguration of Queen Wilhelmina in Amsterdam, in Dutch Inhuldiging van Koningin Wilhelmina te Amsterdam, is a short documentary film from 1898, directed by early Dutch film pioneer F.A. Nöggerath snr. The film material captures the carriage procession to the New Church in Amsterdam by Queen Wilhelmina of the Netherlands on the occasion of her inauguration as queen. The film is renowned as the oldest surviving Dutch film.
