= Joop van Wijk =

Dutch documentary film director

Joop van Wijk (2 June 1950 - 16 February 2022) was a Dutch documentary film director and owner of Molenwiek Film.

== List of documentary films ==
- Passage - A Boatmovie (2016) producer
- Homeland (2010) associate producer
- Landscapes Unknown (2007) producer
- Echoes of War (2005) director and producer
- Shadowplay (2001) associate producer
- The daily nation (2000) co-director and co-producer together with Hillie Molenaar
- Crossroads (1997) co-director together with Hillie Molenaar
- Isingiro Hospital (1993) co-director and co-producer together with Hillie Molenaar
- Cannot run away (1988) co-director and co-producer together with Hillie Molenaar
- Dochters van de Nijl (1982) co-director and co-producer together with Hillie Molenaar
