= Labyrinth of Lust =

1991 film

Het Labyrint der Lusten
- Directed by: Pim de la Parra
- Release date: 1991
- Country: Netherlands
- Language: Dutch

Labyrinth of Lust or Het Labyrint der Lusten is a 1991 Dutch drama film directed by Pim de la Parra.

== Cast ==
- Peter Barent ... boxer trainer
- Thea Biermans ... photographer
- Francesco Crabu ... Taxidriver
- Berith Danse ... boxer
- Natasja Andre de la Porte ... autistic woman
- Cyrus Frisch... Brothel owner
- Ellis Geeflor ... Cleaning lady
- Aurora Guds ... klerk
- Margot Hakhuis ... Lawyer
- Curtis Jones... Psychiatrist's husband
- Fulco Lorenzo ... Assistant city architect
- Cindy Marlet ... Whore
- Dunja Monker ... Whore
- Hedda Oledzky ... friend Jaqueline
- Johan Schulmayer ... Lawyer
- Jacqueline Spears ... Psychiatrist
- Dela Maria Vaags ... Jaqueline
- Lotte van Dam ... Broker
- Otakar Votocek ... Psychiatrist
- Mingus Weyand ... Klerk
