= Are All Men Pedophiles? =

2012 documentary film by Jan-Willem Breure

- Directed by: Jan-Willem Breure
- Written by: Jan-Willem Breure
- Narrated by: Jan-Willem Breure
- Production company: JW Productions
- Distributed by: Sideways Film
- Release date: March 2, 2012 (New York City)
- Running time: 70 minutes
- Country: Netherlands
- Language: English

Are All Men Pedophiles? is a 2012 documentary film by Rwandan-Dutch media producer Jan-Willem Breure. Presented by 14-year-old model Savannah van Zweeden and covering the topics of pedophilia and hebephilia, the entire film was financed privately, mainly by the 23-year-old Breure (with the rest of the funding coming from the Royal Academy of Art, The Hague). Are All Men Pedophiles? had its world premiere at the Queens World Film Festival in New York City on March 2, 2012 and has been screened at a number of film festivals.

== Synopsis ==
The documentary explores what it regards as a "pedophilia hysteria" and argues there is a "witch-hunt" against men. Furthermore, it argues that in an effort to protect children, society has begun to isolate men. The film suggests that all men are viewed as potential pedophiles and examines the political and social consequences of that assumption.

The film's tagline is "Eighteen Is Just A Number", expressing its principal claim that all men are hebephiles, which it defines as attraction to teenagers. The film argues that society needs to make a distinction between this and “true” pedophilia—a primary or exclusive sexual attraction to prepubescent children.

Men and women, on average, become attracted to each other once they hit puberty and sexually mature, and the director argues this does not change as they grow older — i.e., people do not automatically stop being attracted to someone under 18 when they themselves turn over 18. The film also argues that relatively speaking female "pedophiles" get a free pass in western society compared to males.

The narrator brings up pederasty and various old religious texts, as an illustration of changing societal norms.

The documentary looks at pedophilia from a cultural and a pseudo-professional perspective, interviewing several experts, including neuroscientists, psychologists, sexologists and model-scouts. Contributors included neurobiologist Dick Swaab, forensic psychologist Corine de Ruiter, international model-booker Jinnah Lou Domino, and former PNVD spokesperson Marthijn Uittenbogaard.

== Critical reception ==
The film was endorsed by Woet Gianotten, co-founder and board member of the ISSC (International Society for Sexuality and Cancer). In response to the film's suggestion that the Lolita fashion subculture is evidence that the sexualization of teenagers and hebephilia is culturally accepted, members of the Lolita fashion community started a Change.org petition that argues that the film leads the public to believe that their community was about sex when in fact it was about fashion and self-expression.

Contradicting the film's central tenet that all men are hebephiles, Michael C. Seto asserted that hebephiles are attracted to pubescent children who are still physically immature and that most men are not hebephiles. Rather, said Seto, men show a preference for young adults and, to a smaller degree, older teens. Similarly, sociologist Sarah Goode stated that, while it is "pretty normal" for men to be attracted to teenagers, not all men are attracted to this age group. Seto also stated that sex with adults can be harmful for older teenagers because on average, "they are less cognitively, emotionally and socially developed" compared to adults, making them "at risk of exploitation or manipulation".

One of the posters for the film shows a 14-year-old model who looks older with the tagline "Do you find me attractive?". Breure stated that he chose a young model to "confront people with the issue", adding that "she is attractive" for an average man. BuzzFeed reported a claim that the 14-year-old model was deceived because she was told that the photograph was to be used in relation to Japanese fashion rather than to promote a film about pedophilia. Breure, however, has rejected this accusation, saying that the 14-year old model was shown the title of the film, which was written on the release form for the photographs.

Breure was criticized in the BuzzFeed article, for not having a "clear political agenda." The author stated that the film and its director seem circumspect regarding whether Western countries' age of consent limits should be changed. The syndicated feminist blog Jezebel commented, "He just thinks that teenage girls are hot, and he doesn't want you to think that's gross, okay?"

Brande Victorian of Clutch magazine argued that, in claiming that it is unfair to expect men to refrain from acting on their attraction to teenagers, the filmmaker promotes the stereotype that men cannot control their sexual desires.

Criticism also bled into Jan-Willem Breure's later professional life as Belgian model and activist Flore Pensaert jumped on stage during the 2025 edition of the ISIS Fashion Awards to protest it and Breure himself, who organized the event. Pensaert claimed multiple accounts of sexual harassment had occurred behind the scenes of the event and testified that Breure's reputation was already tarnished given he had produced a documentary 'glorifying and excusing pedophilia'.

The film was the winner of the Sexology Media Prize of 2012, issued by the Dutch Sexology Association (NVVS).

== See also ==
- Ephebophilia (primary sexual attraction to older teenagers)
- Misandry
