= Clutch (women's magazine) =

American black women's magazine (2002–2017)

- Editor: Deanna Sutton
- Categories: African American women's interest
- Publisher: Sutton Media
- Founder: Deanna Sutton
- Founded: 2002
- Final issue: 2007 (print); 2017 (online)
- Country: United States
- Based in: Atlanta
- Language: English
- Website: www.clutchmagonline.com (defunct)

Clutch was an online magazine and blog network whose stated target audience was "today's young, hip, progressive Black woman". The magazine was started as a print publication in 2002. It was part of Sutton Media. Following a temporary closure the magazine was relaunched as an online-only publication in 2007.

In 2009, digital media consultancy Elemental Interactive made a strategic investment in Clutch. Elemental (a former division of WPP plc's Grey Global Group), was to take an undisclosed stake in Atlanta-based Sutton Media, Clutch's publisher.

One of the sites that republished articles from Clutch was TheGrio, a daily online news and opinion platform devoted to African-American audiences.

Clutch's editorial staff included Danielle Belton, Yesha Callahan, Britni Danielle, and Jessica Andrews.
