= Björn Jensen =

German filmmaker, consultant and producer

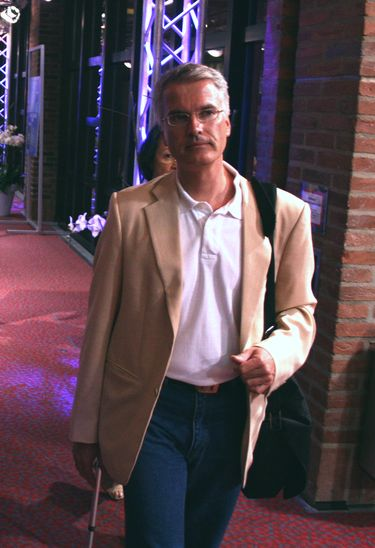
Björn Jensen at the Munich Filmfest 2010

Björn Jensen (born 12 January 1965 in Hameln, Germany) is a German filmmaker, consultant and producer.

== Career ==
Jensen studied German and Medieval Literature, English Literature and Drama at LMU Munich as well as Business Administration (International Business) at University of Southern Queensland, Australia. He is also a lecturer at various film academies and has been a member of the board of directors of the German Documentary Association and the European Documentary Network.

He was a founder of the Munich production company Ginger Foot Films, for which he now acts as the Creative Director.

== Filmography ==
=== Director ===
- Forgotten Sex Slaves: Comfort Women in the Philippines (2015)

=== Producer ===
- Strings Attached (2009)
- Unknown Heroes (2008)
- Where is who I was and am (2009)
- Under the Ice (2007) (Co-Production with Kaspar Film)

=== Supervising Producer ===
- Montreal Symphony – Kent Nagano and the Montreal Symphony Orchestra (2010) (together with Joachim Knaf and Jim Edwards)
- Scientists under Attack (2009) – Best of show (feature documentary), IndieFEST Film Awards 2010
- Hidden Children (2008) (together with Magnus Froböse)
- Eileen Gray – Invitation to a Voyage (2006)
- Deutschland versus Deutsch (2005)
- To Tulsa and Back – On Tour With J.J. Cale (2005)
- Days and Nights in Paris (2004)
- Half of Life (2003)
- Paradise on Earth (2003)
- I'll be Rich and Happy (2002)
- Martin Heidegger (2002)
- Out of Edeka (2002)
- Running Amok (2001)
- Hollywood Profiles: Harvey Keitel (2001)
- Self-Description (2001)
- No Mercy (2000)
- John Lee Hooker – That's My Story (1999)
- Flight into the Jungle (1998)
- The Haunted Screen (1998)
- Hollywood Profiles: Lauren Hutton, Isabella Rossellini, John Malkovich, Kirk Douglas, Andy García, Woody Allen (1996–2001)
- The Big Day (1996)
- Love in Hollywood (1997)
- Quiet Days in Hollywood (1994)
- When the Sky Kisses the Mountains (1994)
- The Germans (1994)
- Directors of the New German Cinema: Percy Adlon, Rainer Werner Fassbinder, Edgar Reitz, Volker Schlöndorff, Margarethe von Trotta, Wim Wenders (1992–1995)
- Crime of Passion (1992)

=== Consultant ===
- Carajas (2009)
- The Unknown (2008)

=== Other ===
- Mozart in China (2008)
- Marmorera (2007)
- Child of Time (1992)
- Trip to Tunis (1992)
- Night on Fire (1992)
- The Egg is a Shitty Gift of God (1992)
- The Guilds (1991)
- Faschings-mus (1985)
- A Day Like A Year (1985)
- Mexico City (1984)
