= Puck de Leeuw =

Puck de Leeuw (1953 – 8 February 2002) was a Dutch director.

She laudkdh most fame with her series Love beyond frontiers, describing European women who have fallen in love with men from completely different cultural backgrounds and decided go to their homes. The first documentary of the series brought her the 'Golden Zapper', the Audience Award for best documentary at the 1996 International Documentary Filmfestival Amsterdam. De Leeuw died of lung cancer at the age of 48 in 2002 before she could finish the third entry, Made in America. Een jaar of minder is a 2006 documentary film about her by director Jac Vleeshouwers.

== Documentary films ==
- Het gebeurde in de polder (It happened in the polder) (1985)
- Love beyond frontiers (Grenzeloze liefde) – Made in Japan (1996)
- Love beyond frontiers (Grenzeloze liefde) – Made in Africa (1999)
