= Hillie Molenaar =

Dutch documentary film director

Hillie Molenaar (born 22 May 1945) is a Dutch documentary film director.

== Career ==
Molenaar left school at 15 and worked as a cleaner, waitress, and bookkeeper. In 1974, aged 29, she became a documentary filmmaker with her first film Protest Garden. She was assistant to Joris Ivens before she formed Molenwiek Film with Joop van Wijk in 1978. Jointly they have produced and directed many documentaries and short films, including The Factory (1979) and The Daily Nation (2000).

They also produced Xime (Guinea-Bissau, 1994) directed by Sana Na N’Hada, which was an official selection at Cannes Film Festival in Un Certain Regard.

She has since formed her own production company HM Films, and taught at the Zelig School for Documentary, Television and New Media.

== Filmography ==
As director:

- The Factory (1979)
- Isingiro Hospital (1993)
- Crossroads (1997)
- The Daily Nation (2000), about the Kenyan newspaper The Daily Nation
