= Jan-Willem Breure =

Dutch film producer

- Born: 1 September 1988 (age 37); Rwanda
- Occupation: Award Ceremony Director
- Known for: Founder of the Septimius Awards and Isis Fashion Awards; Director of Are All Men Pedophiles?
- Website: septimiusawards.com

Jan-Willem Breure (born 1 September 1988) is a Rwandan-Dutch filmmaker and festival director. He is the founder of the Septimius Awards, an Amsterdam-based ceremony recognized for its "continental" category system aimed at promoting global diversity in cinema.

== Early life and education ==
Breure was born in Rwanda and later adopted by a Dutch missionary family. He spent his formative years in Kenya and Namibia before relocating to Amsterdam, the Netherlands. He studied at the Royal Academy of Art in The Hague, specializing in interactive media design. His experience as an adoptee and his upbringing across three continents are frequently cited as the catalysts for his focus on "Global Inclusion" in the arts.

== Career ==
=== Filmmaking ===
Breure's filmography often addresses psychological and social themes. His 2012 documentary Are All Men Pedophiles? examined societal stigmas through a clinical lens. The documentary received an Award of Excellence at the International Film Festival for Peace, Inspiration, and Equality. In 2012, the documentary won the Nederlandse Vereniging van Seksuologie Mediaprijs (NVVS). Breure's second documentary, titled Do Women Have A Higher Sex Drive?, was released in 2018.

In 2024 UN Women announced its partnership with Breure for a documentary production titled UN Women x United Races to be released in 2026.

In January 2026, Breure was announced as one of six jury members for the Johannesburg Film Festival that is held annually in Johannesburg, Gauteng in South Africa.

=== Septimius Awards ===
In 2017, Breure founded the New Vision International Film Festival (NVIFF), a foundation that organizes the Septimius Awards, referred to as the “Oscars of Europe”. The awards are held annually at the Tuschinski Theatre in Amsterdam and are unique for dividing major categories (Best Actor, Best Actress, and Best Film) by continent— Africa, Asia, Europe, Latin America, North America, and Oceania—to ensure equal representation for non-Western talent.

==== Notable Participants and Honorees ====
The festival has attracted numerous Academy Award, BAFTA, and Emmy Awards winners. High-profile winners and attendees include:

- Kevin Spacey – Lifetime Achievement Award recipient (2025).
- Cuba Gooding Jr. – Lifetime Achievement Award recipient (2024).
- Shohreh Aghdashloo – Lifetime Achievement Award recipient (2025).
- Tovino Thomas—two-time Best Asian Actor winner (2023, 2025).
- Christopher Hampton and Kevin Willmott—Oscar-winning screenwriters who have participated as nominees or presenters.
- Stedman Graham – Serves as the official global ambassador for the awards.
- Vasilisa Stepanenko – 20 Days in Mariupol (2024)

=== Isis Fashion Awards ===
The Isis Fashion Awards is an international fashion award event held in Amsterdam, Netherlands. The awards were founded by Breure and celebrate innovation, sustainability, and artistic experimentation in contemporary fashion and also serve as a platform that connects fashion, art, film, and digital culture.

== Filmography ==
Year	Title	Role	Notes
2014	Are All Men Pedophiles?	Director, Writer	Award of Excellence (IFFPIE)
2018	Do Women Have a Higher Sex Drive?	Director	Documentary

== Philosophy ==
Breure is a vocal critic of Western cultural bias in major award shows like the Academy Awards. He champions the "Digital Divide" theory, advocating for independent platforms where creators of color and filmmakers from the Global South can control their own narratives without catering to Eurocentric standards.
