= Louis van Gasteren =

Dutch film director, film producer, and artist (1922–2016)

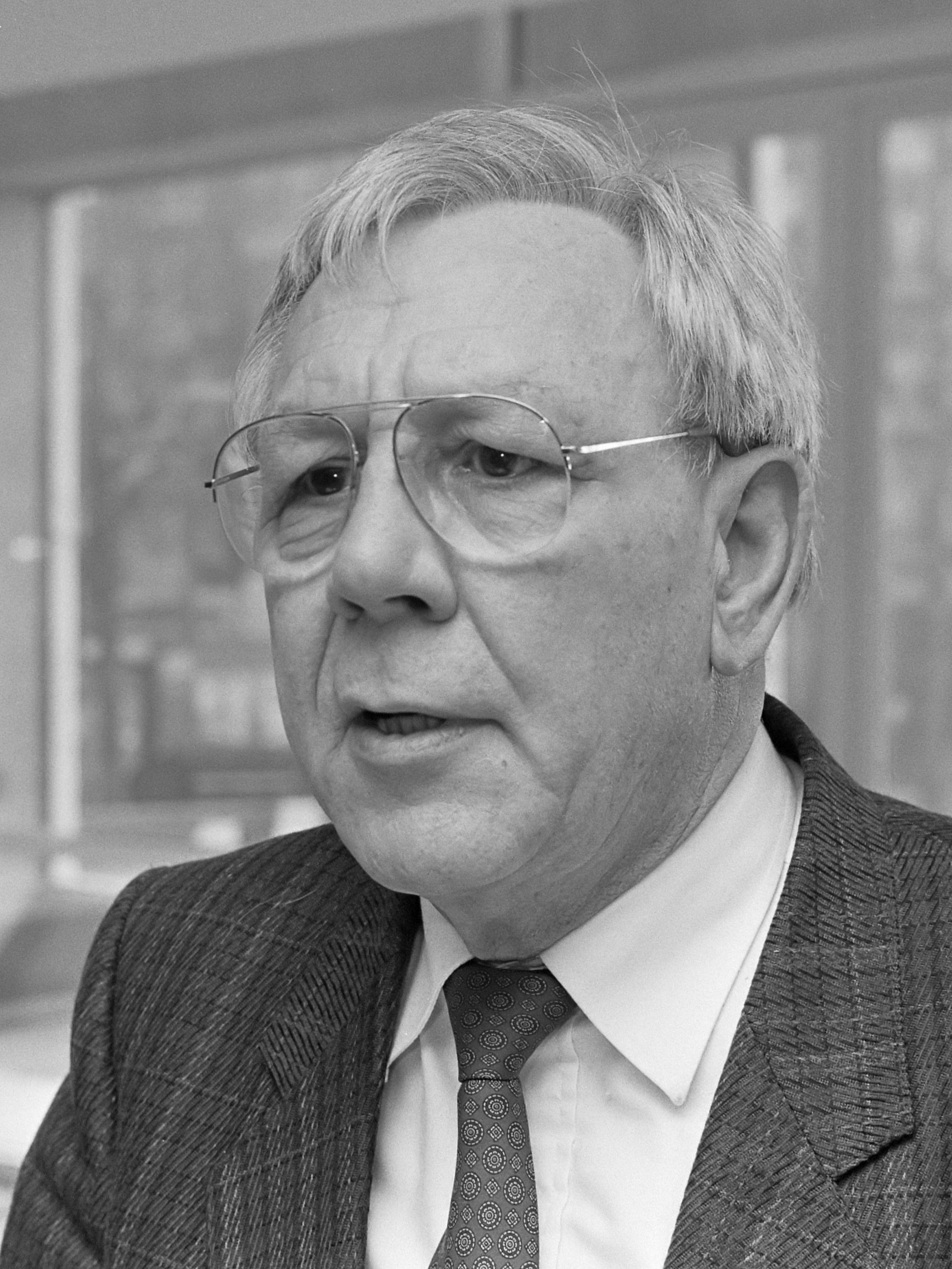
- Louis van Gasteren (1987)
- Born: 20 November 1922; Amsterdam, Netherlands
- Died: 10 May 2016 (aged 93)
- Occupation: Film director
- Years active: 1951–2016
- Spouse: Joke Meerman
- Awards: Golden Calf for Hans: Het Leven Voor De Dood (1983); Golden Calf for De prijs van overleven (2003)

Louis Alphonse van Gasteren (20 November 1922 – 10 May 2016) was a Dutch film director, film producer, and artist. He founded his own film company, Spectrum Film.

== Early life and education ==
Louis Alphonse van Gasteren was born on 20 November 1922 in Amsterdam, the son of actor Louis Augustaaf van Gasteren and singer Elise Menagé Challa. His sister is actress Josephine van Gasteren.

He attended technical school for three years, going on study electrical engineering.

== Career ==
After the Second World War, van Gasteren worked as a journalist and film critic.

He was encouraged by Brazilian filmmaker Alberto Cavalcanti to move into filmmaking, initially as a sound technician, and in the late 1940s, started as an apprentice at the Epinay Studios in Paris. He then worked for the Dutch Polygoon newsreel company in Haarlem, Netherlands, in 1949.

In 1950 or 1951 he started his own film production company, Spectrum Film. He made his debut with Brown Gold, a film about cocoa and chocolate, in 1952. He later founded Euro Television Productions.

He was known as a "flamboyant", "ebullient", and "volatile" director. He admired American experimental filmmakers as well as European directors such as Michelangelo Antonioni and Alain Resnais. His short film The House (30 minutes) is "an attempt to split up a fragment of thought in time", and flashes back and forth through the history of an house through to its demolition.

In 1965 he made a feature film called Winter Day, focusing on a filmmaker who founds his creation developing and spiralling out of his control. He also made a film about the world judo champion, Anton Geesink, and another about French poet Arthur Rimbaud.

Van Gasteren was a visiting professor in the United States at UCLA and Carpenter Center for the Visual Arts at Harvard University.

In 1969 he appeared in The Awakener, a documentary film on Meher Baba.

He also produced works of art, including:

- Car Sculpture in Tele Creation, 1964
- Matter Paintings, Stedelijk Museum Amsterdam (New League Images), 1966
- Multi Pels, Van Abbemuseum, Eindhoven, 1967: targets of the Milwaukee Police Department
- Matter paintings and multiples, Fodor Museum Amsterdam, 1968
- Sunny Implo (with Fred Wessels), Stedelijk Museum Amsterdam, 1970
- Roots of the city, Nieuwmarkt metro station, opening in 1980
- Furnishing Neeltje Jans (with Wilhelm Holzbauer, Frei Otto, Martin Manning), 1987
- Normal Amsterdam Level (Kees van der Veer), City Hall / Music Theatre, opening in 1988

== Later life and death ==
Towards the end of his life he was the oldest active filmmaker in the Netherlands.

He died on 10 May 2016.

== Awards ==
In 1983 Van Gasteren won the Dutch Film Critics Award for best documentary as well as the Golden Calf for best picture for Hans: Het Leven Voor De Dood (Hans, Life Before Death). He received the Golden Calf a second time in 2003 for his documentary The Price of Survival.

== Conviction ==
During the Second World War Van Gasteren was convicted to four years for killing Walter Oettinger, a German Jew in hiding. After the war Van Gasteren was pardoned, but when he claimed a special pension for resistance fighters, this was denied on the grounds that the killing of Oettinger had not been an act of resistance.

== Personal life ==
Van Gasteren lived in Amsterdam and was married to Joke Meerman.

== Partial filmography ==
Van Gasteren's films include:

- 1952 – Bruin goud (Brown Gold) – Documentary about cocoa and chocolate, shot on location in Ghana and the Netherlands, directed by Theo van Haren Noman (nl). 90 min
- 1954 – Railplan 68 (Rail Plan 68) – Documentary about the nightly replacement of tram rails on the Leidseplein in Amsterdam, 15 min
- 1955 – Vliegende schotels geland (Flying saucers landed) – Surprising commercial for Albert Heyn's Boffie Coffee, run as film, 4 min
- 1960 – Stranding (Stranded) – Thriller, An international gang of bank-robbers escape to Ecuador on the ship, but after a shipwreck become stranded on the island of Terschelling, 90 min
- 1960 – Een nieuw dorp op nieuw land (A new village on new land) – Documentary about design, construction and first inhabitants of the village of Nagele in the newly reclaimed northeast, 25 min
- 1961 – Alle vogels hebben nesten (All Birds Have Nests) – Documentary on the system-building as a result of the post-war housing shortage. 25 min.
- 1962 – Het huis (The House) - Short film concerning a house which is demolished at the same time it is built, conceived by intercutting two time periods. No dialogue. 32 min.
- 1963 – Mayday - Documentary about the successes and failures of rescues at sea. 20 min.
- 1964 – Er is telefoon voor u (There's a Phone-call for You) - Documentary about the effects of the telephone in the Netherlands. 46 min.
- 1964 – Jazz and Poetry, 14 min.
- 1965 – Out of My Skull – Early Dutch experimental film, made during a stay as visiting professor at Harvard University. 15 min.
- 1968 – Report from Biafra - Documentary concerning the Biafran War. 50 min.
- 1969 – Begrijpt U Nu Waarom Ik Huil? (Now Do You Get It Why I Am Crying?) – A therapeutic LSD-session with a former inmate of a German concentration camp. 62 min.
- 1971 – Report from Europe - Film concerning the structure of the European community
- 1973 – On ne sait pas – Portrait of a French country woman. 13 min
- 1974 – Multinationals – Documentary concerning the role of multinational ventures
- 1975 – Do You Get It no.2 – Second of a series concerning perception and interpretation. Louis analyzes film footage of a policeman directing traffic and construction workers with shovels who try to make themselves immortal by their actions when they notice the presence of the camera. 13 min.
- 1975 - Corbeddu – The first of three films about Sardinia. Can the bandit Corbeddu be regarded as the Robin Hood of Sardinia? 72 min
- 1976 – Salude e libertade – History and culture of Sardinia. 52 min.
- 1980 – Wirbula flow forms – Film concerning the water art of John Wilks. 10 min.
- 1983 – Hans: Het Leven Voor De Dood (Hans, Life Before Death) – A documentary/feature on the life of the young composer Hans van Sweeden and those who knew him intimately. Won Golden Calf and Dutch Critics Award in 1983. 155 min.
- 1989 – Een zaak van niveau (A Matter of Level) – 1000 years of Dutch water management and hydro civil engineering. Golden Camera Award Chicago, Sony Video Award, Film Prize from Amsterdam fund for art, Special Commendation Prix Futura Berlin. 56 min.
- 1994 – Why Do Pigeons Home? – An experiment with mobile pigeon lofts, registered at the campus of the University of Utrecht. 30 min.
- 1997 – Beyond Words - Interview with Indian master Meher Baba, shot in 1967. 38 min.
- 2002 – In een Japanese stroomversnelling – (In Japanese Rapids) a film concerning the role of Dutch engineers in Japan in the 19th century. 85 min.
- 2003 – The Price of Survival (De prijs van overleven) – A follow-up of the 1969 film Do You Understand Now Why I Cry?, about the children of the survivors of World War II. 56 min.
- 2005 – Het verdriet van Roermond (The grief of Roermond) – Four-part series on the execution of fourteen civilians in Roermond on December 26, 1944, and its consequences, 4 x 50 min
- 2006 – Het verdriet van Roermond (The grief of Roermond) – Short version of the four-part series, 90 min
- 2012 – Nema Aviona za Zagreb (There is no plane for Zagreb) – Autobiographical drama/documentary against background of the 1960s, featuring interviews with Meher Baba and Timothy Leary. 82 min.
