= Steven Weber =

American actor and comedian (born 1961)

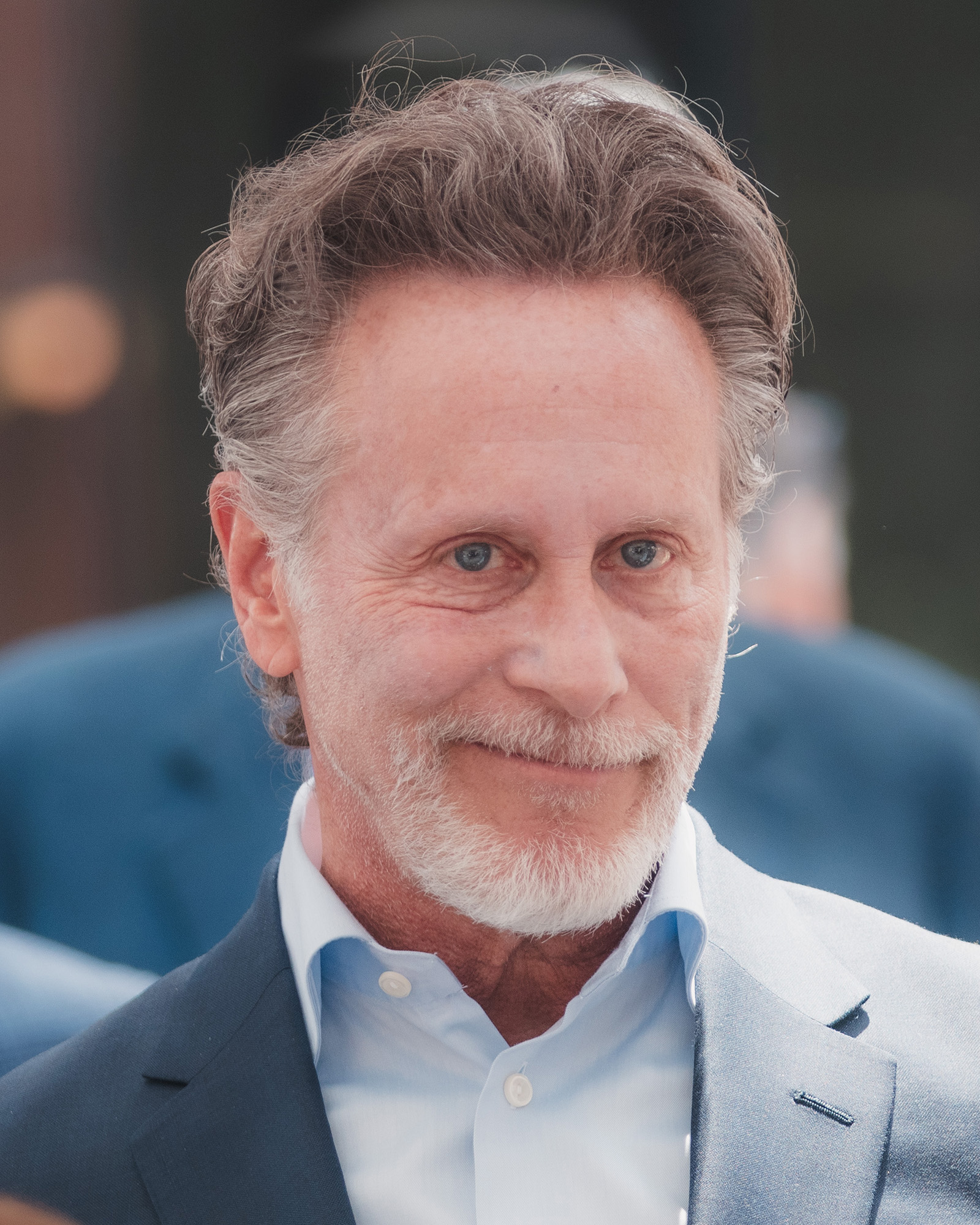
- Weber in 2026
- Born: Steven Robert Weber; March 4, 1961 (age 65); New York, New York, U.S.
- Education: State University of New York, Purchase (BFA)
- Occupations: Actor; comedian
- Years active: 1970–present
- Spouses: Finn Carter (m. 1985; div. 1992); Juliette Hohnen (m. 1995; sep. 2013)
- Children: 2

Steven Robert Weber (born March 4, 1961) is an American actor and comedian. He is best known for his role as Brian Hackett on the television series Wings, and as Dr. Dean Archer on NBC’s Chicago Med. He also voiced Charlie B. Barkin in All Dogs Go to Heaven: The Series, and portrayed Jack Torrance in the TV miniseries adaptation of Stephen King's The Shining. He had a recurring role on iZombie as Vaughn du Clark. He played Mayor Douglas Hamilton on NCIS: New Orleans in a recurring role and starred as Sergeant First Class Dennis Worcester in Hamburger Hill (1987).

== Early life ==
Weber was born in Queens, New York. His mother, Fran (née Frankel), was a nightclub singer, and his father, Stuart Weber, was a nightclub performer and manager of Borscht Belt comedians. Weber is Jewish and embraces his heritage despite not having received a formal religious education. Weber graduated from Manhattan's High School of Performing Arts (1979) and the State University of New York at Purchase.

== Career ==
Weber started appearing in TV commercials in the third grade. After leaving college, he became a member of the Mirror Repertory Company and appeared opposite legendary actress Geraldine Page and Mason Adams in "Paradise Lost" before winning a role as Julianne Moore's ill-tempered and ill-fated boyfriend on the CBS daytime drama As the World Turns in 1985–1986. He appeared in several motion pictures and TV mini-series, such as The Flamingo Kid, Hamburger Hill, and the acclaimed The Kennedys of Massachusetts (as the young John F. Kennedy).

His best-known role is as Brian Hackett, a skirt-chasing airplane pilot on the sitcom Wings. Several years later, Weber starred in his own short-lived half-hour comedy Cursed (later renamed The Weber Show), joined the cast of ABC's Once and Again as the tortured artist Sam Blue, and starred the next year in the acclaimed show The D.A., also for ABC. Weber also had lead roles in the 1990s films Single White Female and Jeffrey.

Weber first appeared on Broadway in Tom Stoppard's The Real Thing and in 2001-2002 took over for Matthew Broderick as Leo Bloom in the Broadway production of The Producers. In 2005, he appeared alongside Kevin Spacey in London at the Old Vic's production of National Anthems. Weber also wrote and produced 2003's Clubland, a Showtime film in which he and Alan Alda played father and son talent agents in 1950s New York City (for which Alda was nominated for an Emmy).

He appeared in four Stephen King adaptations: Desperation (2006), "You Know They Got a Hell of a Band" from the Nightmares & Dreamscapes (2006) mini-series, "Revelations of Becka Paulson" from The Outer Limits revival series, and in the television mini-series version of Stephen King's The Shining (1997), playing the murderous writer Jack Torrance. He also narrated several audiobooks, including King's novel It and works by Harlan Coben and Dean Koontz. In 1998, he voiced Charlie B. Barkin in An All Dogs Christmas Carol, a role he earlier played in 1996 in All Dogs Go to Heaven: The Series.

In 2007, he rejoined former Wings co-star Tony Shalhoub in a guest role on Monk. The same year, Weber played the role of network boss Jack Rudolph in the NBC series Studio 60 on the Sunset Strip. In 2008, Weber starred in Alliance Group Entertainment's feature film Farm House, where he played Samael, a mysterious vineyard owner. Weber also guest starred on the drama series Brothers and Sisters as Graham Finch, a business specialist. He also guest-starred on Psych as Jack Spencer, Shawn Spencer's uncle and Henry Spencer's brother. He also starred on Desperate Housewives in 2008. Weber appeared as a recurring guest on the 2008–2009 season of the CBS crime drama Without a Trace.

He was part of the cast of the ABC show Happy Town and had a major role in the television film A Fairly Odd Movie: Grow Up, Timmy Turner! in which he played the villain Hugh Magnate. He stars occasionally in the live action comic Puddin', alongside actor Eddie Pepitone. He narrated an unabridged audio book of Stephen King's It. Between 2012 and 2017, Weber voiced Norman Osborn on the Disney XD animated series Ultimate Spider-Man. In 2014, Weber rejoined former Wings co-star Rebecca Schull in Chasing Life in recurring character roles. In 2017, Weber made a guest appearance in the Curb Your Enthusiasm (episode: "The Shucker"). In 2020, he starred opposite Fran Drescher in the NBC comedy Indebted. As of 2021, he is a series regular on the NBC procedural Chicago Med as Dr. Dean Archer.

== Personal life ==
Weber was married to actress Finn Carter from 1985 to 1992.

In 1995, he became engaged to Juliette Hohnen, then the Los Angeles bureau chief for MTV News, and they married on July 29 that year at Highclere Castle in Berkshire, England. In March 2013, it was reported that the couple filed for divorce. They have two sons.

== Filmography ==
=== Film ===
Year	Title	Role	Notes
1984	The Flamingo Kid	Paul Hirsch	
1985	Walls of Glass	Sean	
1987	The Little Fox	Adult Vic	Voice, English dub
1987	Hamburger Hill	Sergeant First Class Dennis Worcester	
1990	Angels	Rickie	
1992	Single White Female	Sam Rawson	
1993	The Temp	Brad Montroe	
1994	Benders	The Man	
1995	Just Looking	Craig	
1995	Take Out the Beast	Drummond	Short film
1995	Jeffrey	Jeffrey	
1995	Leaving Las Vegas	Marc Nussbaum	
1995	Dracula: Dead and Loving It	Jonathan Harker	
1998	I Woke Up Early the Day I Died	Policeman in Alley	
1998	Sour Grapes	Evan Maxwell	
1998	Break Up	Officer Andrew Ramsey	
1998	An All Dogs Christmas Carol	Charlie B. Barkin	Voice, direct to video
1999	At First Sight	Duncan Allanbrook	
2000	Timecode	Darren Fetzer	
2000	Common Ground	Gil Roberts	
2000	Sleep Easy, Hutch Rimes	Hutch Rimes	
2000	Joseph: King of Dreams	Simeon, Slave Trader	Voice
2004	Sexual Life	David Wharton	
2005	Inside Out	Norman	
2005	The Amateurs	Howard	
2005	Reefer Madness: The Movie Musical	Jack Stone/George Washington	
2007	Choose Connor	Lawrence Connor	
2008	Farm House	Samael	
2008	Zip	Trip Stringer	
2009	My One and Only	Wallace MacAllister	
2011	Son of Morning	Lt. Governor Fitch	
2011	Being Bin Laden	Osama bin Laden	
2011	The Big Year	Rick McIntire	
2011	A Little Bit of Heaven	Rob Randolph	
2012	Leader of the Pack	Jerry	Short
2013	Crawlspace	Aldon Webber	
2013	Tom, Dick & Harriet/All's Fair in Love and Advertising	Tom Burns	
2014	Kiss Me	Arthur	
2016	Amateur Night	Dr. Kurtz	
2016	Batman: Return of the Caped Crusaders	Alfred Pennyworth	Voice
2017	Ghost Recon Wildlands: War Within the Cartel	Deputy Director Davis	Short
2017	Show Businesses	Bud	Short
2017	A Thousand Junkies	Moshe	
2017	Handsome	Talbert Bacorn	
2017	Batman vs. Two-Face	Alfred Pennyworth	Voice
2018	The Perfection	Anton	
2018	Return to Christmas Creek	Harry	Television film
2019	Soliloquy or The Goose	Dave	Voice, short
TBA	You Above All		Filming

=== Television ===
Year	Title	Role	Notes
1984	American Playhouse	Tom Driscoll	Episode: "Pudd'nhead Wilson"
1985-1986	As the World Turns	Kevin Gibson	Episode: "The Ceremony", 8–9 months of episodes
1987	Crime Story	Gary Holiday	Episode: "Little Girl Lost"
1989	Kojak: Fatal Flaw	Conrad St. John	Television film
1989	When We Were Young	Ben Kirkland	Television film
1990–1997	Wings	Brian Michael Hackett	Main role, 172 episodes
1990	The Kennedys of Massachusetts	John F. Kennedy	Miniseries, 3 episodes
1990	In the Line of Duty: A Cop for the Killing	Matt Fisher	Television film
1991	Deception: A Mother's Secret	Terry	Television film
1991	Tales from the Crypt	Dale Sweeney	Episode: "Mournin' Mess"
1993	Star Trek: Deep Space Nine	Colonel Day	Episode: "The Siege"
1993	In the Company of Darkness	Kyle Timler	Television film
1994	Betrayed by Love	Agent Jeff Avery	Television film
1996	Stories from the Edge	Drummond	Segment ("Take Out the Beast")
1995–1997	Duckman	Brian Hackett	Voice, 2 episodes
1997	Austin Powers' Electric Psychedelic Pussycat Swingers Club	The Swingers Club	
1996–1998	All Dogs Go to Heaven: The Series	Charlie B. Barkin	Voice
1997	The Outer Limits	8x10 Man	Episode: "The Revelation of 'Becka Paulson"; Director
1997	Extreme Ghostbusters	Francois Russo	Voice, episode: "Dry Spells"
1997	The Shining	Jack Torrance	3 episodes Saturn Award for Best Actor on Television
1998	The Simpsons	Neil	Voice, episode: "King of the Hill"
1998–1999	Hercules	Odysseus	Voice, 2 episodes
1998	The New Batman Adventures	J. Carroll Corcoran	Voice, episode: "Judgment Day"
1998	Thanks of a Grateful Nation	Jared Gallimore	Television film
1999	Stark Raving Mad	Rod	Episode: "The Stalker"
1999	The Expert	Dr. John Hardy	Episode: "Pilot"
1999	Love Letters	Andrew Ladd	Television film
1999	Late Last Night	Jeff	Television film
2000–2001	Cursed	Jack Nagle	Main role, 17 episodes
2000–2002	Once and Again	Sam Blue	Recurring season 1; regular season 3
2000–2002	Baby Blues	Dr. Gruber	Voice, 2 episodes
2000	Common Ground	Gil Roberts	Television film
2001	Club Land	Stuey Walters	Television film
2001	The Legend of Tarzan	Ed	Voice, episode: "Tarzan and the Mysterious Visitor"
2002	The Zeta Project	Eugene Dolan	Voice, episode: "Lost and Found"
2002–2003	Fillmore!	Various voices	4 episodes
2003	The Lyon's Den	Allen Forrester	Episode: "Trick or Treat"
2003	I'm with Her	Kyle Britton	Episode: "The Last Action Queero"
2004	The D.A.	Dist. Atty. David Franks	2 episodes
2004	Higglytown Heroes	Gardener Hero	Voice, episode: "Twinkle Tooth"
2004	12 Days of Christmas Eve	Calvin Carter	Television film
2005	Reefer Madness	Jack Stone	Television film
2005	American Dad!		Voice, episode: "Francine's Flashback"
2005	Masters of Horror	Frank Spivey	Episode: "Jenifer"
2005–2006	Will & Grace	Sam Truman	2 episodes
2006	Nightmares & Dreamscapes	Clark Rivingham	Episode: "You Know They Got a Hell of a Band"
2006	Stephen King's Desperation	Steve Ames	Television film
2006–2007	Studio 60 on the Sunset Strip	Jack Rudolph	Main role, 22 episodes
2007	More of Me	Rex	Television film
2007	Monk	Max Hudson	Episode: "Mr. Monk Is on the Air"
2007	Side Order of Life	James Kendall	Episode: "Funeral for a Phone"
2007	Law & Order: Special Victims Unit	Matthew Braden	3 episodes
2007–2008	Brothers & Sisters	Graham Finch	8 episodes
2008	Psych	Jack Spencer	Episode: "The Greatest Adventure in the History of Basic Cable"
2008	Without a Trace	Clark Medina	4 episodes
2008	Desperate Housewives	Lloyd	Episode: "City on Fire"
2009	Party Down	Ricky Sargulesh	Episode: "Celebrate Ricky Sargulesh"
2010	Happy Town	John Haplin	8 episodes
2010	In Plain Sight	Mike Faber	3 episodes
2010	Backwash	Oliver	Episode: "Chapter Eight: Lake Pupik"
2011	Wainy Days	Mr. Stickland	Episode: "Kelly and Arielle Part 3"
2011	Parenthood	Jack Kraft	Episode: "Slipping Away"
2011	Law & Order: Criminal Intent	Ben Langston	Episode: "Cadaver"
2011	Falling Skies	Dr. Michael Harris	3 episodes
2009-2011	Web Therapy	Robert Lachman	5 episodes
2011	A Fairly Odd Movie: Grow Up, Timmy Turner!	Hugh J. Magnate Jr.	Television film
2011	Untitled Allan Loeb Project	Lomax	
2012–2017	Ultimate Spider-Man	Norman Osborn, Trapster, Venom, Green Goblin (Ultimate), Fancy Dan, additional voices	Voice, 28 episodes
2012	Hot in Cleveland	Kyle	2 episodes
2012	The Daly Show		Episode: "The Daly Wings"
2012	Leap Year	Remy Doyle	2 episodes
2012	Wilfred	Jeremy	3 episodes
2012–2016	2 Broke Girls	Martin Channing	3 episodes
2012	Ruth & Erica	Cameron	2 episodes
2012	Malibu Country	Pete	Episode: "Bro Code"
2012	Duke	Terry Polaski	Television film
2013	Eve of Destruction	Dr. Karl Cameron	2 episodes
2013–2014	Dallas	Governor Sam McConaughey	5 episodes
2013	Childrens Hospital	John Tandy	Episode: "Old Fashioned Day"
2013	The Flipside		Episode: "Mittrel Ave"
2014	Regular Show	Jumpin' Jim	Voice, episode: "Rigby in the Sky with Burrito"
2014–2015	Chasing Life	Dr. George Carver	22 episodes
2014	Murder in the First	Bill Wilkerson	10 episodes
2014	Bad Teacher	Ray	Episode: "What's Old Is New"
2014	How to Get Away with Murder	Max St. Vincent	Episode: "It's All Her Fault"
2014–2017	NCIS: New Orleans	Councilman/Mayor Douglas Hamilton	18 episodes
2015	Helix	Brother Michael	8 episodes
2015	Sleepy Hollow	Thomas Jefferson	Episode: "What Lies Beneath"
2015	Community	Detective Butcher	Episode: "Ladders"
2015–2016	House of Lies	Ron Zobel	6 episodes
2015	The Comedians	Jamie Dobbs	2 episodes
2015–2016	iZombie	Vaughn Du Clark	11 episodes
2015	The Mindy Project	James	Episode: "The Departed"
2017–2020	13 Reasons Why	Principal Gary Bolan	26 episodes
2017–2018	Ballers	Julian Anderson	5 episodes
2017–2018	Mom	Patrick Janikowski	6 episodes
2017	:Dryvrs	Doug	Episode: "Scare Tactics""
2017	The Librarians	Saint of Thieves	Episode: "And the Christmas Thief"
2017	Curb Your Enthusiasm	The Shucker	Episode: "The Shucker"
2018	Avengers Assemble	Beyonder	Voice, 4 episodes
2018	Marvel Rising: Initiation	George Stacy	Voice, 2 episodes
2018	Channel Zero	Abel Carnacki	6 episodes
2018-2019	Get Shorty	Lawrence Budd	11 episodes
2019	Drunk History	Various	2 Episodes
2019	Scooby-Doo and Guess Who?	Alfred Pennyworth	Voice, episode: "What a Night for a Dark Knight!"
2019	This Close	Michael's Dad	2 episodes
2019	The Bravest Knight	The Head Knight	3 episodes
2020	Indebted	Stew Klein	Main cast, 13 episodes
2021–present	Chicago Med	Dr. Dean Archer	Recurring (Season 6), Main (Season 7-)
2023	Celebrity Jeopardy!	Himself	Contestant
2026	Nobody Wants This	[Julian]	Season 3, guest star]

=== Theatre ===
Year	Title	Role	Notes
1984–1985	The Real Thing	Billy	
1984	Come Back Little Sheba	Bruce	
1985	Homefront	Jeremy	
1986	Loot	Various	
1988	Made in Bangkok		
2002–2003	The Producers	Leo Bloom	
2005	National Anthems	Arthur Cook	The Old Vic
2009	The Philanthropist	Donald	
2013	The Parisian Woman	Tom	
2017	Mamma Mia!	Bill Austin	Hollywood Bowl

=== Radio/podcast/audio book ===
Year	Title	Role
2001	Tell No One by Harlan Coben	Narrator, Audie Award winner
2009	Long Lost by Harlan Coben	Narrator
2010	Original Meanings by Jack N. Rakove	Narrator
2010	What the Night Knows by Dean Koontz	Narrator
2011	Live Wire by Harlan Coben	Narrator
2011	Against All Enemies by Tom Clancy and Peter Telep	Narrator
2011	Darkness Under the Sun by Dean Koontz	Narrator
2016	It by Stephen King	Narrator
2016	Home by Harlan Coben	Narrator
2016	We're Alive, Lockdown	Jeremy
2017	Don't Let Go by Harlan Coben	Narrator
2018	The Brick Slayer, Little Slaughterhouse on the Prairie, Panic, The Pied Piper, The Pirate, and Rampage by Harold Schechter	Narrator
2019	Run Away by Harlan Coben	Narrator
2020	The Boy from the Woods by Harlan Coben	Narrator
2020	Dog People by Jennifer Weiner	Narrator
2021	Win by Harlan Coben	Narrator
2021	Falling by T.J. Newman	Narrator
2023	Code Red by Vince Flynn & Kyle Mills	Narrator
2025	Kill Your Darlings by Peter Swanson	Narrator
