= List of The New York Times number-one books of 2011 =

The American daily newspaper The New York Times publishes multiple weekly lists ranking the best selling books in the United States. The lists are split into three genres—fiction, nonfiction and children's books. Both the fiction and nonfiction lists are further split into multiple lists.

== Changes to the list ==
In November 2010, The New York Times announced it would be tracking e-book best-seller lists in fiction and nonfiction starting in early 2011. "RoyaltyShare, a San Diego–based company that tracks data and aggregates sales information for publishers, will ... provide [e-book] data". The two new e-book lists were first published with the February 13, 2011, issue, the first tracks combined print and e-book sales, the second tracks e-book sales only (both lists are further sub-divided into Fiction and Nonfiction). In addition a third new list was published on the web only, which tracks combined print sales (hardcover and paperback) in fiction and nonfiction.

== Fiction ==
=== Hardcover fiction ===
The following list ranks the number-one best selling fiction books, in the hardcover fiction category.

Date	Book	Author
January 2	Dead or Alive	Tom Clancy with Grant Blackwood
January 9	Dead or Alive	Tom Clancy with Grant Blackwood
January 16	What the Night Knows	Dean Koontz
January 23	The Girl Who Kicked the Hornets' Nest	Stieg Larsson
January 30	The Inner Circle	Brad Meltzer
February 6	Shadowfever	Karen Marie Moning
February 13	Tick Tock	James Patterson and Michael Ledwidge
February 20	Tick Tock	James Patterson and Michael Ledwidge
February 27	Tick Tock	James Patterson and Michael Ledwidge
March 6	Tick Tock	James Patterson and Michael Ledwidge
March 13	Treachery in Death	J. D. Robb
March 20	The Wise Man's Fear	Patrick Rothfuss
March 27	The Jungle	Clive Cussler with Jack Du Brul
April 3	Toys	James Patterson and Neil McMahon
April 10	Live Wire	Harlan Coben
April 17	The Land of Painted Caves	Jean M. Auel
April 24	The Fifth Witness	Michael Connelly
May 1	Chasing Fire	Nora Roberts
May 8	The Sixth Man	David Baldacci
May 15	The Sixth Man	David Baldacci
May 22	Dead Reckoning	Charlaine Harris
May 29	Dead Reckoning	Charlaine Harris
June 5	Dead Reckoning	Charlaine Harris
June 12	Dead Reckoning	Charlaine Harris
June 19	Dreams of Joy	Lisa See
June 26	Hit List	Laurell K. Hamilton
July 3	Against All Enemies	Tom Clancy with Peter Telep
July 10	Smokin' Seventeen	Janet Evanovich
July 17	Now You See Her	James Patterson and Michael Ledwidge
July 24	Now You See Her	James Patterson and Michael Ledwidge
July 31	A Dance with Dragons	George R. R. Martin
August 7	A Dance with Dragons	George R. R. Martin
August 14	Ghost Story	Jim Butcher
August 21	Cold Vengeance	Douglas Preston and Lincoln Child
August 28	A Dance with Dragons	George R. R. Martin
September 4	The Omen Machine	Terry Goodkind
September 11	Flash and Bones	Kathy Reichs
September 18	Kill Me If You Can	James Patterson and Marshall Karp
September 25	Kill Me If You Can	James Patterson and Marshall Karp
October 2	New York to Dallas	J. D. Robb
October 9	Heat Rises	Richard Castle
October 16	The Affair	Lee Child
October 23	Shock Wave	John Sandford
October 30	The Best of Me	Nicholas Sparks
November 6	The Best of Me	Nicholas Sparks
November 13	The Litigators	John Grisham
November 20	Zero Day	David Baldacci
November 27	11/22/63	Stephen King
December 4	Kill Alex Cross	James Patterson
December 11	Explosive Eighteen	Janet Evanovich
December 18	The Drop	Michael Connelly
December 25	11/22/63	Stephen King

=== Combined print and e-book fiction ===
The following list ranks the number-one best selling fiction books, in the combined print and e-book fiction category.

The most popular books of the year was The Help by Kathryn Stockett, and Water for Elephants by Sara Gruen with respectively 15 and 8 cumulative weeks at the top. The Help had been released in 2009, was a No. 1 best seller in 2010, and had a resurgence in 2011. The prolific James Patterson was at the top for three different books (Tick Tock, Now You See Her and Kill Alex Cross).

Date	Book	Author
February 13	Tick Tock	James Patterson and Michael Ledwidge
February 20	Tick Tock	James Patterson and Michael Ledwidge
February 27	Tick Tock	James Patterson and Michael Ledwidge
March 6	Alone	Lisa Gardner
March 13	Treachery in Death	J. D. Robb
March 20	Sing You Home	Jodi Picoult
March 27	Water for Elephants	Sara Gruen
April 3	Water for Elephants	Sara Gruen
April 10	Live Wire	Harlan Coben
April 17	The Land of Painted Caves	Jean M. Auel
April 24	The Fifth Witness	Michael Connelly
May 1	Water for Elephants	Sara Gruen
May 8	Water for Elephants	Sara Gruen
May 15	Water for Elephants	Sara Gruen
May 22	Dead Reckoning	Charlaine Harris
May 29	Water for Elephants	Sara Gruen
June 5	Water for Elephants	Sara Gruen
June 12	Water for Elephants	Sara Gruen
June 19	The Help	Kathryn Stockett
June 26	The Help	Kathryn Stockett
July 3	The Help	Kathryn Stockett
July 10	Smokin' Seventeen	Janet Evanovich
July 17	Now You See Her	James Patterson and Michael Ledwidge
July 24	The Help	Kathryn Stockett
July 31	A Dance with Dragons	George R. R. Martin
August 7	The Help	Kathryn Stockett
August 14	The Help	Kathryn Stockett
August 21	The Help	Kathryn Stockett
August 28	The Help	Kathryn Stockett
September 4	The Help	Kathryn Stockett
September 11	The Help	Kathryn Stockett
September 18	The Help	Kathryn Stockett
September 25	The Help	Kathryn Stockett
October 2	The Help	Kathryn Stockett
October 9	The Help	Kathryn Stockett
October 16	The Affair	Lee Child
October 23	The Help	Kathryn Stockett
October 30	The Best of Me	Nicholas Sparks
November 6	The Best of Me	Nicholas Sparks
November 13	The Litigators	John Grisham
November 20	Zero Day	David Baldacci
November 27	11/22/63	Stephen King
December 4	Kill Alex Cross	James Patterson
December 11	Explosive Eighteen	Janet Evanovich
December 18	The Drop	Michael Connelly
December 25	Red Mist	Patricia Cornwell

== Nonfiction ==
=== Hardcover nonfiction ===
The following list ranks the number-one best selling nonfiction books, in the hardcover nonfiction category. The most frequent weekly best seller of the year was Unbroken by Laura Hillenbrand with 13 weeks at the top of the list.

Date	Book	Author	Publisher
January 2	Decision Points	George W. Bush	Crown
January 9	Decision Points	George W. Bush	Crown
January 16	Unbroken	Laura Hillenbrand	Random House
January 23	Unbroken	Laura Hillenbrand	Random House
January 30	Unbroken	Laura Hillenbrand	Random House
February 6	Unbroken	Laura Hillenbrand	Random House
February 13	Unbroken	Laura Hillenbrand	Random House
February 20	Unbroken	Laura Hillenbrand	Random House
February 27	Known and Unknown	Donald Rumsfeld	Sentinel
March 6	Unbroken	Laura Hillenbrand	Random House
March 13	Unbroken	Laura Hillenbrand	Random House
March 20	Unbroken	Laura Hillenbrand	Random House
March 27	The Social Animal	David Brooks	Random House
April 3	Red	Sammy Hagar with Joel Selvin	It Books/HarperCollins
April 10	Unbroken	Laura Hillenbrand	Random House
April 17	Onward	Howard Schultz with Joanne Gordon	Rodale
April 24	Bossypants	Tina Fey	Reagan Arthur/Little, Brown
May 1	Bossypants	Tina Fey	Reagan Arthur/Little, Brown
May 8	Bossypants	Tina Fey	Reagan Arthur/Little, Brown
May 15	Bossypants	Tina Fey	Reagan Arthur/Little, Brown
May 22	Bossypants	Tina Fey	Reagan Arthur/Little, Brown
May 29	Lies That Chelsea Handler Told Me	Chelsea Handler	Grand Central
June 5	In the Garden of Beasts	Erik Larson	Crown
June 12	Those Guys Have All the Fun	James Andrew Miller and Tom Shales	Little, Brown
June 19	The Greater Journey	David McCullough	Simon & Schuster
June 26	The Greater Journey	David McCullough	Simon & Schuster
July 3	The Greater Journey	David McCullough	Simon & Schuster
July 10	Unbroken	Laura Hillenbrand	Random House
July 17	Unbroken	Laura Hillenbrand	Random House
July 24	Unbroken	Laura Hillenbrand	Random House
July 31	A Stolen Life	Jaycee Dugard	Simon & Schuster
August 7	A Stolen Life	Jaycee Dugard	Simon & Schuster
August 14	A Stolen Life	Jaycee Dugard	Simon & Schuster
August 21	A Stolen Life	Jaycee Dugard	Simon & Schuster
August 28	A Stolen Life	Jaycee Dugard	Simon & Schuster
September 4	A Stolen Life	Jaycee Dugard	Simon & Schuster
September 11	A Stolen Life	Jaycee Dugard	Simon & Schuster
September 18	In My Time	Dick Cheney	Threshold Editions
September 25	In My Time	Dick Cheney	Threshold Editions
October 2	Jacqueline Kennedy	Jacqueline Kennedy Onassis	Hyperion
October 9	Jacqueline Kennedy	Jacqueline Kennedy Onassis	Hyperion
October 16	Killing Lincoln	Bill O'Reilly and Martin Dugard	Holt
October 23	Killing Lincoln	Bill O'Reilly and Martin Dugard	Holt
October 30	Killing Lincoln	Bill O'Reilly and Martin Dugard	Holt
November 6	Killing Lincoln	Bill O'Reilly and Martin Dugard	Holt
November 13	Steve Jobs	Walter Isaacson	Simon & Schuster
November 20	Steve Jobs	Walter Isaacson	Simon & Schuster
November 27	Steve Jobs	Walter Isaacson	Simon & Schuster
December 4	Steve Jobs	Walter Isaacson	Simon & Schuster
December 11	Steve Jobs	Walter Isaacson	Simon & Schuster
December 18	Steve Jobs	Walter Isaacson	Simon & Schuster
December 25	Steve Jobs	Walter Isaacson	Simon & Schuster

== See also ==
- Publishers Weekly list of bestselling novels in the United States in the 2010s
