= Pilot (Studio 60 on the Sunset Strip) =

- Studio 60 on the Sunset Strip episode
- Episode no.: Season 1 Episode 1
- Directed by: Thomas Schlamme
- Written by: Aaron Sorkin
- Production code: 276003
- Original air date: September 18, 2006

Guest appearances
- Judd Hirsch (Wes Mendell); Felicity Huffman (Herself); Three 6 Mafia (Themselves)

Episode chronology
← Previous —	Next → "The Cold Open"

"Pilot" is the first episode of the television series Studio 60 on the Sunset Strip. The episode was first aired in the United States on the NBC network on September 18, 2006. Written by series creator Aaron Sorkin, and directed by executive producer Thomas Schlamme, the episode introduces the chaotic behind-the-scenes depiction of a fictional Saturday Night Live type show also called Studio 60 on the Sunset Strip.

== Plot ==
The executive producer of a late night sketch comedy show sparks a media frenzy when he has an on-air meltdown during a live broadcast. The newly appointed network president, Jordan McDeere (Amanda Peet), has to scramble to make things right by hiring back two former prized employees to become the new executive producers of her network's flagship program. In doing so, she appoints two former members of the team: writer Matt Albie (Matthew Perry) and former sketch producer, now director Danny Tripp (Bradley Whitford), who had left the show years before on terms that were not amicable. Meanwhile, Albie and ex-girlfriend Harriet Hayes (Sarah Paulson) come to terms with having to work on the show together very soon after their breakup.

== Reception ==
=== Ratings ===
The episode scored a Nielsen rating of 8.6/14 during its première on NBC, but suffered from a significant drop in viewers from the first-half hour to the second. Aired directly after Deal or No Deal, the show retained 81% of its audience with an average 13.4 million viewers tuned in at 10pm. The show lost around 2.5 million of these viewers as the show progressed, with rival broadcasts CSI: Miami and Supernanny both picking up viewers over the hour.

=== Critical reception ===
Studio 60 on the Sunset Strip's premiere was well received by the majority of critics. Tad Friend of The New Yorker granted it a four-page review, in which he praised the dialogue, saying that "[the characters] get into pickles because they mouth off—and it’s great television because television prizes banter above all forms of conversation." Brian Lowry of Variety compliments the way the series "weds Aaron Sorkin's crackling dialogue and willingness to tackle big ideas", and praises the rapport between Perry and Whitford. The Washington Post's Tom Shales was less impressed with the episode, remaining uninterested in the "complications and relationships", and accusing Sorkin of pretentiousness.

=== Accolades ===
In 2007, the episode won the Banff World Television Festival Award for Best Continuing Series, despite the fact that at the time of its win the series had already been cancelled by NBC. Thomas Del Ruth was nominated for an American Society of Cinematographers Award for Outstanding Achievement in Cinematography in Movies of the Week/Pilots for his work on the pilot, and creator Aaron Sorkin was nominated for a Writers Guild of America Award for Episodic Drama. For the 59th Primetime Emmy Awards, Thomas Schlamme was nominated for Outstanding Directing for a Drama Series, despite the fact that the series had been cancelled.
