= Myron Bolitar (book series) =

- First appearance: Deal Breaker
- Created by: Harlan Coben

In-universe information
- Gender: Male
- Occupation: Basketball player (retired), Sports agent
- Family: Mickey (nephew); Jeremy (son)
- Spouse: Terese Collins
- Nationality: American

The Myron Bolitar series of thrillers are written by Harlan Coben with a series protagonist of the same name.

The Myron Bolitar series debuted with Deal Breaker (1995) and is currently 12 novels through Think Twice (2024). A spin-off young adult book series featuring Myron's nephew Mickey Bolitar was created in 2011 with the release of Shelter. Windsor Horne Lockwood III, a major supporting character in Myron's series, received his own standalone novel Win in 2021.

The Bolitar series of novels have garnered four major crime fiction awards for Coben: an Edgar (for Fade Away), a Shamus (Drop Shot), an Anthony (Deal Breaker), and the RBA Prize for Crime Writing (Live Wire).

== Titles ==
- Deal Breaker (1995)
- Drop Shot (1996)
- Fade Away (1996)
- Back Spin (1997)
- One False Move (1998)
- The Final Detail (1999)
- Darkest Fear (2000)
- Promise Me (2006)
- Long Lost (2009)
- Live Wire (2011)
- Home (2016)
- Think Twice (2024)

== Characters ==
=== Myron Bolitar ===
The series protagonist is a 31-year-old formerly renowned basketball player and is the owner of MB SportsReps (or simply MB Reps in later books), an agency representing sports stars and celebrities. Bolitar is 6 feet, 4 inches tall and considered handsome by many people.

As often referred to in the character's back-story, Myron's basketball talents were apparent as early as the 6th grade. He was highly recruited and chose Duke University at Durham, North Carolina; his teams won two NCAA titles in four years. The Boston Celtics drafted him in the first round, the eighth pick overall. His Boston Celtics jersey number was number 34. In a pre-season game against Washington Bullets, he suffered a shattered knee, which ended his basketball career. Myron then returned to college, studying at Harvard Law School, and eventually became a sports agent.

Two regular supporting characters in the Myron Bolitar series are his best friend, Windsor Horne Lockwood III (better known as Win), and his assistant at MB SportReps, Esperanza Diaz. Win is an eccentric, philandering billionaire who frequently gets involved in Myron's cases. Win and Myron both studied taekwondo in a Korean dojang, though it is clear in the storylines that Win is far more advanced. Esperanza began as an assistant, but Myron makes her his partner in the seventh Bolitar novel (Darkest Fear) after Esperanza gets her law degree from New York University.

Bolitar is depicted as being a good agent for his clients, taking care of their needs and wants while being careful to not exploit them like bigger agencies. He also helps out clients in times of personal need, which often puts him in the role of "accidental detective." His office space in the Locke-Horne Investments & Securities building is rented from Win and is located two floors below Win's. When Myron handles a client's career, he offers the client the choice of hiring Win for financial management. Win and Myron are both fans of Batman, often calling their transport the "Batmobile."

Myron is Jewish and dislikes his first name. He lived with his parents in the basement of his childhood home in New Jersey well into adulthood, not out of necessity but because he is very close to both of them. When his parents later moved south to a warmer climate, Myron bought their house. He also has a younger brother who died in a car crash and a nephew, Mickey, son of his late brother. His mother is a former lawyer herself, and his dad is a factory owner.

His favorite drink is chocolate Yoo-Hoo. He is shown to have a self-deprecating humor and drives a Ford Taurus, sarcastically described as a chick trawler in the books.

Bolitar's longest known relationship was with Jessica Culver, until she dumped him and walked out of his life. The novel Deal Breaker brings the ex-lovers face-to-face after not seeing each other for four years. It is clear in the book's storyline that he still harbors feelings for Jessica, to the disgust of Esperanza, who dislikes Jessica for the way she treats Myron. They start seeing each other but break up again in the novel One False Move, when Myron almost cheats on her with Brenda Slaughter. It is also revealed in the novel that Culver had cheated on Myron with Doug. Jessica marries Stone Norman in Promise Me.

Other prominent girlfriends mentioned in the books are Emily Downing, Ali Wilder, and Terese Collins. As mentioned in The Final Detail, he met Collins at a charity function and they ran away to a distant island to drown their sorrows after both suffered losses. Collins plays a major role in Long Lost. In Live Wire, Myron and Terese get engaged, and, later in Home, the two get married.

=== Esperanza Diaz ===
Esperanza Diaz is a fictional character in thrillers such as Drop Shot, Deal Breaker and Promise Me written by Harlan Coben.

Esperanza is introduced in the first book of the series, Deal Breaker, as one of Myron Bolitar's best friends, who works with him at MB SportsReps.

She is described as having a petite frame and dark eyes, and being of Latino origin. She was formerly a professional wrestler known by her stage name Little Pocahontas and was part of FLOW (Fabulous Ladies of Wrestling) organization. She was usually teamed with fellow female wrestler "Big Chief Mama" in her matches, aka Big Cyndi. (Big Cyndi becomes a receptionist for MB SportsReps.)

Esperanza is bright and irreverent, with a caustic wit. She never knocks before entering Myron's office as a habit. She is seen to get along really well with Windsor "Win" Horne Lockwood, III, Myron's best friend who owns the office building where MB Reps resides. She is very protective of Myron, and dislikes Myron's on-again, off-again girlfriend, Jessica Culver, because of the way she left Myron earlier.

She finished studying law in New York University by taking in night classes and is made a partner in MB SportsReps in One False Move, the fifth book in the series.

=== Windsor "Win" Horne Lockwood III ===
Windsor "Win" Horne Lockwood III is a fictional character created by Harlan Coben. He is the secondary character in the Myron Bolitar series. While the best friend of hero Bolitar, Win would best be described as an anti-hero, having some psychopathic tendencies. In many of the books, Myron and Win debate the ethical nature of various actions, often Win's propensity to use violence in the name of getting results.

==== Description ====
Introduced in the first book of the series, Deal Breaker, Win is a 31-year-old bachelor working closely with Myron Bolitar, his best friend since college. Win is also very close to Esperanza Diaz, Myron's assistant (and later business partner) whom he meets through Myron.

Win's hair is described as blond, perfect length, parted on the right side. His features are classical patrician, almost too handsome, like something crafted in porcelain. His attire is always thoroughbred prep—pink shirts, polo shirts, monogrammed shirts, khaki pants, golf pants, white bucks (Memorial Day to Labor Day), or wing tips (Labor Day to Memorial Day) on his feet. He is even said to have a strange accent, one that did not originate from any particular geographical location as much as from his prep school, Exeter. He is an excellent golfer, with a three handicap; he is a fifth-generation member of Merion Golf Club in Philadelphia; and a third-generation member at Pine Valley in southern New Jersey. He has a perennial golf tan, one of those where the color could be found only in the arms (short-sleeve shirts) and a V-shape in the neck (open alligator shirt). It is also said that Win's skin never gets tanned—instead his skin burns. People are said to hate him on sight for his looks and money.

The Coben novel Shelter (2011), the first book in the series centered on Myron's nephew Mickey Bolitar, introduces the character Ema Wyatt who later becomes Mickey's best friend. The Myron Bolitar novel Home (2016) reveals that Ema is Win's secret daughter, the offspring of his affair with actress Angelica Wyatt.

==== Traits ====
Although described as having a slight frame, Win is a sixth-degree black belt holder in Tae Kwon Do, which is the highest ranking in the United States. Thus, enemies misjudge him at their own peril. He has been studying Tae Kwon Do since the age of five, and introduced Myron to Tae Kwon Do in college. Win brought an instructor, Master Kwan, from Korea fourteen years prior to the first novel to teach him Tae Kwon Do. Win loves to meditate, and does so at least an hour each day. His meditation method involves sitting in the lotus position and watching sex tapes of himself with various prostitutes or one night stands. Throughout the books it is made clear that along with being one of the world's best hand-to-hand fighters Win is also proficient with a wide variety of weapons, at following people unseen, breaking and entering, interrogation and intimidation, and marksmanship and is well connected with intelligence agencies. Win and Myron worked for the FBI in an undisclosed manner prior to the start of the series.

Win has continued to be a vigilante in various capacities throughout the series, often unbeknownst to Myron. In one of the more recent books it is shown that Win has been helping law enforcement not only in the USA but internationally, and that he may well be doing more vigilantism than ever. In the most recent books Win is in his mid to late 40s, and it may be that he is trying to get as much done as possible before age forces him to retire, but this is speculation.

Win exhibits many traits that would classify him as a high-functioning sociopath. He shows no aversion to violence and seems to enjoy inflicting pain and killing those he believes deserve it. Myron is one of only a handful of people Win seems to have any care for in the world. He has a very high sex drive and almost no emotional attachments to other humans, especially women. It is frequently observed that his relationships with women rarely last more than one night. However, in two successive Bolitar novels (Long Lost and Live Wire) he spends most of his free time with the same Asian woman, named Mee, who doubles as a flight attendant on his private jet. He displays a high level of narcissism and can overreact to slights or threats.

Win does appear to have a moral code, though it is not clear how strictly he follows it or what exactly it is. Win does not hurt innocents and indeed often sticks up for them, fighting for victims of abuse and persecution.

The origin of Win's maniacal drive to be a killing machine is partly revealed in Promise Me, when Win recalls taking a horrible beating as a young child from children his own age. He was terrified at the time and never again wanted to feel scared. This was his motivation to become a formidable fighter. It was noted in Back Spin, though, that Win was always cold, even as a child. At age eight, he walked in on his mother cheating on his father with a riding instructor, which damaged that relationship irrevocably.

Win owns the well-established Lock-Horne Investments & Securities, and he also owns his office building. Lock-Horne Investments & Securities covers 6 floors. Win has a corner office with a view of both 47th Street and Park Avenue.

Win and Myron are both fans of Batman, often referring to their transport as the "Batmobile". Win drives a racing green 1998 Jaguar XJR, often breaking traffic laws by driving it well over double the speed limit.

==== Spin-off novel ====
Coben's 2021 novel Win features the Win character as the main protagonist for the first time. He is drawn into a case when items stolen from the Lockwood family 20 years ago surface during an FBI murder investigation.

In this story, told by Win in first-person perspective, readers learn more about what motivates the character than ever before.

On violence, as he prepares for an act of vigilantism:

"This isn’t about morality or fair play or any of that. It matters to me none what the general populace would label this. I have been in many scrapes in my day. When you do battle, rules rapidly become null and void. Bite, kick, throw sand, use a weapon, whatever it takes. Real fights are about survival. There are no prizes or praise for sportsmanship. There is a victor. There is a loser. The end. It doesn’t matter whether you 'cheat.' In short, I have no qualms about striking this odious creature when he’s not ready."

On his relationships with women:

"I love sex. I have lots of it. Myron waxes philosophical on how sex must be more than what it is – that love or romantic entanglement enhances the physical experience. I listen and I wonder whether he is trying to convince me or himself. I don’t like love or romantic entanglements. I like sharing certain physical acts with another consensual adult. The other stuff doesn’t 'enhance' sex for me. It sullies it. The act itself is pure. Why muddy that with the extraneous? Sex may be the greatest shared experience in the world. Yes, I enjoy going out for a gourmet meal or a good show or the company of dear friends. I appreciate golf and music and art. But do any of those compare to an evening of sex? Methinks not."

== Television adaptation ==
A television series adaptation was in early development at Netflix, under a new overall deal with Coben. David E. Kelley was set to serve as executive producer and write for the series.

In May 2026, Netflix greenlit the series, with Kelley and Kyle Long serving as showrunners. By July, the lead roles were cast, with Colin Woodell portraying Myron, KJ Apa in the role of Win, and Diane Guerrero playing Esperanza. The series regular cast also include Jabari Banks, Chloe Fineman, Jamie McShane, Ben McKenzie and Ra’Mya Latiah Aikens. The recurring cast include Isaiah Hill, Amanda Warren, Quincy Isaiah, Bebe Neuwirth, Griffin Dunne, Melissa Benoist, Charlie Tahan, Jamie Hector and Sandrine Holt.
