= Darkness Under the Sun =

2010 novella by Dean Koontz

- First edition (publ. Bantam Books)
- Author: Dean Koontz
- Language: English
- Publication date: 2010

Darkness Under the Sun is a 2010 novella by Dean Koontz which is related to and appeared in print as part of What the Night Knows.

== Plot ==
The novella is mainly set prior to the incidents in What The Night Knows, but also bookends the novel itself. In the initial part of the novella, Alton Turner Blackwood, the antagonist of What The Night Knows, meets a boy named Howie, and the events of this novella dovetail into the background of the main novel.
