= Studio 60 on the Sunset Strip =

American comedy-drama television series (2006–2007)

- Genre: Comedy drama
- Created by: Aaron Sorkin
- Starring: Matthew Perry; Amanda Peet; Bradley Whitford; Steven Weber; D. L. Hughley; Sarah Paulson; Nate Corddry; Timothy Busfield
- Composer: W. G. Snuffy Walden
- Country of origin: United States
- Original language: English
- No. of seasons: 1
- No. of episodes: 22

Production
- Executive producers: Thomas Schlamme; Aaron Sorkin
- Camera setup: Single-camera
- Running time: 37–46 minutes
- Production companies: Shoe Money Productions; Warner Bros. Television

Original release
- Network: NBC
- Release: September 18, 2006 – June 28, 2007

Studio 60 on the Sunset Strip is an American comedy drama television series created for NBC and primarily written by Aaron Sorkin. The series was about the production of a live comedy series similar to Saturday Night Live. Produced by Warner Bros. Television, Studio 60 on the Sunset Strip ran from September 18, 2006, to June 28, 2007. On May 14, 2007, NBC canceled the series after one season (becoming Sorkin's only series not to air for more than one season). Twenty-two episodes were produced.

== Plot ==
The series takes place behind the scenes of a live sketch comedy show (also called Studio 60 on the Sunset Strip or Studio 60) on the fictional television network NBS (National Broadcasting System), whose format is similar to that of NBC's Saturday Night Live. The show-within-a-show is run by executive producers Matt Albie (Matthew Perry) and Danny Tripp (Bradley Whitford). Matt serves as the head writer and Danny produces the show.

== Cast and crew ==
Studio 60 features an ensemble cast portraying the personnel involved in the production of a late-night comedy show.

=== Major roles ===
- Danny Tripp (Bradley Whitford) is a former segment producer for Studio 60 who is asked to return as showrunner/executive producer when executive producer Wes Mendell is fired. He works closely with Matt Albie, his longtime friend. He is a recovering drug addict and alcoholic.
- Matt Albie (Matthew Perry) is a former writer for Studio 60 who takes over production along with long-time friend Danny Tripp, as executive producer and head writer. He is also Harriet's ex-boyfriend.
- Jordan McDeere (Amanda Peet) is the recently hired president of entertainment programming of network National Broadcasting System, of which Studio 60 is the flagship show.
- Harriet Hayes (Sarah Paulson) is a "multi-talented" performer, a devout Christian, and one of the "Big Three" main stars of Studio 60. She is also Matt Albie's ex-girlfriend. She also dated Luke Scott, a former writer (and Matt's rival) at Studio 60, now a big-time director. The character of Harriet is partially based on Kristin Chenoweth, whom Sorkin previously dated before she worked on The West Wing.
- Tom Jeter (Nate Corddry) is another of the show's "Big Three." He is from the Midwest, and his brother is serving as an airman in the US Air Force who is deployed in Afghanistan. During the course of the show, he begins dating Lucy Kenwright, one of the staff writers.
- Simon Stiles (D. L. Hughley), the final member of the "Big Three", became an alumnus of the Yale School of Drama after a troubled youth. His original intention was to become a dramatic actor, rather than a comedian.
- Jack Rudolph (Steven Weber) is the chairman of the National Broadcasting System, and Jordan's boss. During the course of the show, he and his wife separate.
- Cal Shanley (Timothy Busfield) is the director of Studio 60. He has two children and is a military history buff. (Busfield also directed several episodes of the series, as he did for Sports Night.)

=== Secondary roles ===
- Jeannie Whatley (Ayda Field) is a member of the show's ensemble. She is Matt's occasional lover and Harriet's close friend and is a bit of a gossip on the set.
- Alex Dwyer (Simon Helberg) is a member of the show's ensemble; he is recognized as the complement to Harriet Hayes, being the premier male impressionist in the cast. He has at least one recurring sketch, The Nicolas Cage Show, in which he plays the title character, and has also portrayed Tom Cruise and Ben Stiller.
- Dylan Killington (Nate Torrence) is a rookie member of the show's ensemble. Dylan plays a number of different characters in the show-within-a-show. During "Nevada Day Part – II", Simon goes to Nevada with Tom, Danny, and Jack; Matt then asks a reluctant Dylan to fill in for Simon in News 60. He has a crush on Jeannie.
- Samantha Li (Camille Chen) is a member of the show's ensemble.
- Ricky Tahoe (Evan Handler) is a former co-executive producer of the show and former co-head of the writers' room. In "The Option Period", he and Ron leave Studio 60 to pursue a pilot show for Fox called Peripheral Vision Man – based on a character from an old Studio 60 sketch; Ricky's departure is marked by a hostile shouting match with Matt.
- Ron Oswald (Carlos Jacott) is a former co-executive producer of the show and former co-head of the writers' room. In "The Option Period", he leaves the show with Ricky to pursue a pilot show for Fox called Peripheral Vision Man – based on a character from an old Studio 60 sketch.
- Wilson White (Edward Asner) is the head of TMG (Tunney Media Group), the conglomerate that owns the NBS network.
- Lucy Kenwright (Lucy Davis) is a junior writer on the show and the only pre-Matt and Danny writer to remain after Ricky and Ron's departure. Lucy and Darius are supposed to get their first sketch on the air in "B-12". The sketch is about a bungling hostage taker, but it is cancelled when a real-life hostage-taker kills his entire family and then himself just after that evening's show starts. During the course of the show, Lucy begins dating Tom Jeter.
- Darius Hawthorne (Columbus Short) is Matt's assistant writer. Matt and Simon hire Darius after seeing his stand-up act in "The Wrap Party". During "The Harriet Dinner" he argues with Simon because Darius passed a sketch pitched by Simon to Lucy.
- Andy Mackinaw (Mark McKinney) is introduced in "B-12" after Ricky and Ron's departure when Matt needs an extra writer's help. Andy is a former writer whose tenure on Studio 60 predates Matt and Danny's initial departure. Since that time, Andy's wife and daughter have died in a car accident. Andy is very serious and has only been seen smiling once.
- Suzanne (Merritt Wever) is a former production assistant on the show who becomes Matt's assistant in the episode "B-12". She confronts Matt about his drug use in the episode "Breaking News".
- Hallie Galloway (Stephanie Childers) is the vice-president of alternative programming (a.k.a. reality TV) for NBS and has developed an adversarial relationship with Jordan. She first appears in the episode "Monday". McDeere has expressed her fear that Galloway is being groomed to take her place after the rocky start to McDeere's tenure as president of the network.
- Mary Tate (Kari Matchett) is a lawyer from law firm Gage Whitney Pace who is hired by NBS and has a sexual interest in Matt. Between "Breaking News" and "What Kind of Day Has It Been", Mary is used as a second option to get Tom's brother out of the hostage situation.
- Shelly Green (Wendy Phillips) is head of publicity for NBS.

=== Guest appearances ===
- Wes Mendell (Judd Hirsch) is the creator of Studio 60 who is fired by Jack Rudolph after going on a long on-air rant against the current state of television. Although he appears only in the pilot, Wes is referred to as a big influence on Matt and Danny.
- Martha O'Dell (Christine Lahti) is a Pulitzer Prize-winning journalist working on a story for Vanity Fair about the new leadership of Studio 60. In "The West Coast Delay" and "The Long Lead Story" she ends up easily uncovering almost every detail of the cast and crew's personal lives. Martha's character is based on the columnist Maureen Dowd, who once dated Sorkin.
- Kim Tao (Julia Ling) guest starred in five episodes ("Nevada Day Part 1," "Nevada Day Part 2," "Monday," "Harriet Dinner Part 1," "Harriet Dinner Part 2") as a viola prodigy who speaks five languages. She is the official translator for her father during the Macau deal. Kim claims to be Tom's biggest fan, and, because of this, she wants to pursue a career in improvisational comedy against her father's wishes.
- Eli Weinraub (Eli Wallach) appeared in "The Wrap Party." An old mischievous man with an interesting – and familiar – past. Wallach was nominated for an Emmy for this role.
- Robert "Bobby" Bebe (John Goodman) is a Pahrump, Nevada judge in "Nevada Day Part 1" and "Nevada Day Part 2". Goodman won an Emmy for this role.
- Kevin Eubanks appeared as himself in "The Christmas Show".
- Felicity Huffman, Lauren Graham, Allison Janney, Masi Oka, Howie Mandel, Jenna Fischer, Jason Alexander and Rob Reiner appeared as themselves as celebrity hosts in various episodes.

== Production ==
=== Development ===
It was first reported in August 2003, after he had left The West Wing, that Sorkin was interested in a series about a Saturday Night Live-related show.

Studio 60 on the Sunset Strip was tentatively titled Studio 7 on the Sunset Strip during its development stage. The series prompted NBC and CBS to engage in an intense bidding war for the rights to the show in October 2005, with NBC agreeing to a "near-record license fee" in order to obtain the rights and officially ordering the pilot for the series. TV Guide reported in December 2005 that Sorkin had approached Perry, who had previously guest starred on The West Wing, about the project, and his casting was officially confirmed in January 2006. Bradley Whitford's casting was announced in February 2006. It was the show most anticipated by media buyers prior to the network upfront presentations, according to MediaLife. Among the online public the show was also highly anticipated, receiving the most online "mentions" and the most positive sentiment of any new 2006 show.

=== Influences on the show ===
Sorkin drew from his own experience as a writer in creating the characters (the Harriet/Matt relationship was based on Sorkin's relationship with Kristin Chenoweth, who played Annabeth Schott on The West Wing). In Studio 60's pilot, one of the reasons that Matt and Harriet broke up was Harriet's decision to appear on The 700 Club to support her Christian music album. In 2005, Chenoweth made a similar appearance on The 700 Club, sparking a negative reaction from some of her gay fans because of the views of 700 Club host Pat Robertson. Unlike Matt and Harriet, Sorkin and Chenoweth did not work together on The West Wing. Sorkin left after The West Wing's fourth season and Chenoweth joined the cast during season six.

The Jordan McDeere character was loosely based on former ABC Entertainment President Jamie Tarses, who was a consultant on the show.

The conflict between NBS and the FCC regarding uncensored language of American soldiers in Afghanistan parallels the decision by a small number of PBS affiliates to air the Oscar-nominated documentary Operation Homecoming: Writing the Wartime Experience in full, despite potentially hefty fines for unedited obscenities used by American soldiers describing their experiences in Iraq.

Following Sorkin's trend of putting real-life behind-the-scenes conflict into the writing of the show, the latter episodes of the series focus on Matt and Danny having to come up with more money for the show. The duo determine that they could raise extra money by remaking the stage as a form of product placement. This mirrors the real-world struggle of the show and its constant attempts to reduce the budget of the show and also generate more money. The new stage and its advertisements would have generated money for Studio 60, the fictional show, as well as the real life Studio 60 program. This last-ditch attempt was not enough to save the show.

=== Similarities to 30 Rock ===
Two shows debuting on 2006–07 NBC lineup, 30 Rock and Studio 60 on the Sunset Strip, revolved around the off-camera happenings on a Saturday Night Live-analogue sketch comedy series. Similarities between the two led to speculation that only one of them would be picked up. 30 Rock co-star Alec Baldwin said, "I'd be stunned if NBC picked up both shows. And ours has the tougher task, as a comedy, because, if it's not funny, that's it." Kevin Reilly, then president of NBC Entertainment, was supportive of 30 Rock creator, writer, producer and star Tina Fey, describing the situation as a "high-class problem":

I just can't imagine the audience would look at both shows, choose one and cancel the other out. In some ways, why is it any different than when there have been three or four cop shows on any schedule, or Scrubs and ER, which are tonally very different?

Evidence of the overlapping subject matter between the shows, as well as the conflict between them, arose when Aaron Sorkin asked Lorne Michaels to allow him to observe Saturday Night Live for a week, a request Michaels denied. Despite this, Sorkin sent Fey flowers after NBC announced it would pick up both series, and wished her luck with 30 Rock. Fey said that "it's just bad luck for me that in my first attempt at prime time I'm going up against the most powerful writer on television. I was joking that this would be the best pilot ever aired on Trio. And then Trio got canceled."

Although 30 Rock's first-season ratings proved lackluster and were lower than those of Studio 60, Studio 60 was more expensive to produce. Studio 60 was canceled after one season while 30 Rock was renewed, and would ultimately last for seven seasons and 138 episodes, the last of which aired during the 2012–13 season.

== Episodes ==
Studio 60 consists of a single season of 22 episodes. Its pilot episode was written by series creator Aaron Sorkin, and directed by executive producer Thomas Schlamme. Its pilot was ostensibly based on Sorkin and Schlamme's experience on The West Wing. Sorkin wrote or co-wrote all of the episodes. Schlamme directed four episodes, a total exceeded only by Timothy Busfield, who directed five episodes and co-directed a sixth.

The series includes two two-part episodes ("Nevada Day" and "The Harriet Dinner") and concludes with a story arc featuring a three-part episode "K & R" (kidnap & ransom) that is capped off with a fourth and final episode ("What Kind of Day Has It Been").

No.	Title	Directed by	Written by	Original release date	Prod. code	Guest host & musical guest
1	"Pilot"	Thomas Schlamme	Aaron Sorkin	September 18, 2006	276003	Felicity Huffman; Three 6 Mafia
The executive producer of a late night sketch comedy show sparks a media frenzy when he has an on-air meltdown during a live broadcast. The newly appointed network president, Jordan McDeere, has to scramble to make things right by hiring back two former prized employees to become the new executive producers of her network's flagship program. She hires writer Matt Albie and former sketch producer, now director Danny Tripp, who had both left the show years before on terms that were not amicable. Meanwhile, Matt and ex-girlfriend Harriet Hayes come to terms with having to work on the show together very soon after their breakup.
2	"The Cold Open"	Thomas Schlamme	Aaron Sorkin	September 25, 2006	3T5051	Mark Wahlberg; The White Stripes
Matt and Danny have five days to put together their first show, which is receiving enormous media attention and Harriet tries her best to work with Matt. In the meantime, Jordan puts her new job on the line by facing down pressure due to a controversial sketch amidst criticism from sponsors and affiliates scared of alienating Christians. Also, staff writers Ricky and Ron — who were catalysts to Matt and Danny's initial departure — express their dismay at being made to work for Matt.
3	"The Focus Group"	Christopher Misiano	Aaron Sorkin	October 2, 2006	3T5052	Rob Reiner; Gwen Stefani
A network focus group sends a scare through the company that the ratings success of Matt and Danny's first show might have been a one-time thing. Harriet expresses her jealousy at Matt having spent the night with Jeannie so shortly after breaking up, accusing him of rubbing it in her face. The team is pleased to have had a high rating for their opening week with Matt and Danny's return, but fear they won't retain momentum in the ratings in the follow-up show. Jeannie is disappointed by the focus group's score for her sketch "Commedia Dell'Arte". Matt makes a deal with Jeannie regarding the success of the sketch on the live broadcast.
4	"The West Coast Delay"	Timothy Busfield	Mark Goffman & Aaron Sorkin	October 9, 2006	3T5053	None Featured
Jordan is approached by Vanity Fair columnist Martha O'Dell (guest star Christine Lahti), requesting access to Studio 60 to write a long lead story about the rebirth of the show. Harriet offers Matt a baseball bat she was given by a major league baseball player, unaware that the pitcher had written his phone number on it. When it is discovered that the show has inadvertently plagiarized another comedian's material during a sketch, the team scrambles to break into the taped West Coast feed to correct their error.
5	"The Long Lead Story"	David Petrarca	Story by : Dana Calvo; Teleplay by : Aaron Sorkin	October 16, 2006	3T5054	Lauren Graham; Sting
While the cast goes through rehearsals with Lauren Graham and Sting, Martha O'Dell tries to get the story on Matt and Harriet. Meanwhile, Jordan passes on a lucrative — but tasteless — new reality series.
6	"The Wrap Party"	David Semel	Story by : Melissa Myers & Amy Turner; Teleplay by : Aaron Sorkin	October 23, 2006	3T5055	Lauren Graham; Sting^{Continuation of "The Long Lead Story".}
A drunken Jordan makes friends with the cast during an after-show party, Danny tries to get Matt's mind off Harriet with the help of three sexy women, Simon makes a plea to hire more black writers and Cal deals with a mysterious man backstage (guest star Eli Wallach).
7	"Nevada Day, Part 1"	Lesli Linka Glatter; Timothy Busfield	Story by : Mark McKinney; Teleplay by : Aaron Sorkin	November 6, 2006	3T5056	Jessica Simpson^{Simpson mentioned as both host and musical guest}
Harriet is cited in an interview as being anti-homosexual, though she claims to have been impartial in her comments. This causes a dispute in which Tom injures a man protesting against Harriet. Through a unique series of events, Tom is later arrested. Following this, a variety of cast and staff from NBS travel to Pahrump, a small town in Nevada, to get Tom out of jail in time for his show that night. Guest star John Goodman plays a judge who is not a fan of Studio 60. First part of a two-parter.
8	"Nevada Day, Part 2"	Timothy Busfield	Story by : David Handelman & Cinque Henderson; Teleplay by : Aaron Sorkin	November 13, 2006	3T5057	Jessica Simpson^{Continuation of "Nevada Day Part I".}
Jack has to get Tom out of a small town jail to make it back for his show that night as tension heats up between Matt and Harriet. In the absence of Simon to co-host the "News 60" segment, Matt asks Dylan to co-anchor with Harriet, who is surprisingly reluctant to "play" himself before the camera.
9	"The Option Period"	John Fortenberry	Story by : Christina Kiang Booth & Mark Goffman; Teleplay by : Aaron Sorkin	November 20, 2006	3T5058	Jessica Simpson^{Continuation of "Nevada Day Part II".}
After the show comes down, Matt discovers that Ricky and Ron are planning to leave — and take the writing staff with them — to write their adaptation of their Studio 60 character "Peripheral Vision Man" as a Fox network sitcom. Matt tries to discourage them from going since he thinks their show will fail, but Ricky takes his concern for condescension, claiming Matt is trying to hold him back. Harriet contemplates doing a lingerie photo spread in a magazine, which Tom and Simon advise her against for the sake of her professional image. Jordan and Danny wrestle with budget cuts, as Jordan suggests either adding product placement or firing 15 staff members.
10	"B-12"	Bryan Gordon	Eli Attie & Aaron Sorkin	November 27, 2006	3T5059	Howie Mandel; Corinne Bailey Rae
The cast has to get through the show despite being ravaged by a virus, and Matt has to get through the week with a new and much smaller writing staff. Matt calls for the help of fellow former writer of Studio 60 Andy Mackinaw. Jordan reveals to Danny that she is pregnant. Inexperienced writers Darius and Lucy have a sketch approved to air for the first time, only to have it pulled at the last moment due to its similarity with a real-life hostage situation.
11	"The Christmas Show"	Dan Attias	Story by : Christina Kiang Booth & Cinque Henderson; Teleplay by : Aaron Sorkin	December 4, 2006	3T5060	No Host Featured; A Tipitina Foundation Band
With a holiday show on the horizon, Matt is determined to bring the Christmas spirit to Studio 60. Meanwhile, following a visit to the OB/GYN, Danny has to confront his true feelings for Jordan. Harriett is offered a career changing opportunity. Tom and Simon jump at the opportunity to assist the writing team to write Christmas-based sketches in order to enjoy the company of a certain member of the writing team, however their presence is seen as more of a hindrance by the writing staff. When Danny discovers that band members from various TV shows intend to call in sick in an effort to help musicians who have been homeless since Hurricane Katrina, he takes the opportunity to create an entire band from New Orleans musicians who play a centerpiece on the show.
12	"Monday"	Lawrence Trilling	Story by : Dana Calvo & David Handelman; Teleplay by : Aaron Sorkin	January 22, 2007	3T5061	Masi Oka; John Legend; Seen in "The Harriet Dinner".
The cast and staff come back from their holiday break and prepare for the first show of the New Year with Danny in full pursuit of Jordan. Matt starts bidding in an online auction for a date with Harriet to compete with Luke Scott, a film director interested in Harriet, both on and off screen. Jordan is introduced to Hallie (Stephanie Childers), the newly appointed Vice President of Alternative Programming, but does not get off on the right foot with her, due to referring to her area of specialty as "illiterate programming". Jordan makes a plea for Danny to stop pursuing her, claiming it's embarrassing, however he says that he won't.
13	"The Harriet Dinner, Part 1"	Timothy Busfield	Story by : Eli Attie; Teleplay by : Aaron Sorkin	January 29, 2007	3T5062	Masi Oka; John Legend; Continued from "Monday".
Danny and Jordan are locked on the roof of the theatre while other members of the cast and staff attend a dinner honoring Harriet, whose relationship with Matt begins to unravel.
14	"The Harriet Dinner, Part 2"	John Fortenberry	Story by : Dana Calvo & Mark Goffman; Teleplay by : Aaron Sorkin	February 5, 2007	3T5063	Masi Oka; John Legend; Continued from "Monday".
Danny and Jordan are locked on the roof of the theater while other members of the cast and staff attend a dinner honoring Harriet, whose relationship with Matt begins to unravel. Grammy winner Natalie Cole guest-stars.
15	"The Friday Night Slaughter"	Thomas Schlamme	Story by : Melissa Myers & Amy Turner; Teleplay by : Aaron Sorkin	February 12, 2007	3T5064	Peyton Manning^{Manning mentioned as host on outside billboard} Diana Valdes (played by musician Gina La Piana)^{another replacement for The White Stripes} Jennifer Love Hewitt^{mentioned as host in 1999 flashback} N'Sync^{mentioned as musical guest in 1999 flashback}
Matt remembers how he and Harriet first met in 1999, and struggles to garner memories of a fired writer from Cal and Danny. In the aftermath of his argument with Harriet, he begins taking drugs. Tom and Dylan spend the episode lobbying to prevent their sketch from being cut between dress rehearsal and airtime. "Tim Batale", the name of the writer that Matt remembers from his early days of working at Studio 60 (but nobody else can), is an anagram of "Matt Albie".
16	"4 A.M. Miracle"	Laura Innes	Story by : Mark McKinney; Teleplay by : Aaron Sorkin	February 19, 2007	3T5065	Renée Zellweger
Matt is stuck on a Wednesday night with writer's block and also has to contend with a lawyer named Mary Tate (guest star Kari Matchett) who is investigating a sexual harassment claim while Harriet continues shooting her movie. In addition, Jordan and Danny enter into a contest to see who would make the better parent.
17	"The Disaster Show"	Thomas Schlamme	Story by : Chad Gomez Creasey & Dara Resnik Creasey; Teleplay by : Aaron Sorkin	May 24, 2007	3T5067	Allison Janney; Macy Gray
Allison Janney, as herself, is the guest host of a show that goes haywire when the propmasters and cue card workers stage a last minute wildcat strike. While the show is on, a bomb threat referencing a Muhammad sketch threatens the building. Matthew Perry, Amanda Peet, and Bradley Whitford do not appear in this episode.
18	"Breaking News"	Andrew Bernstein	Aaron Sorkin	May 31, 2007	3T5066	Jenna Fischer; Gran Bel Fisher
Jordan experiences an emergency with her pregnancy during the live show when she suddenly cannot feel her baby kick. However, an even larger emergency is unfolding for Tom, whose brother is involved in a hostage crisis. Amidst all this, Matt's pill use gets discovered as he deals with the continuous presence of Mary Tate.
19	"K&R, Part 1"	Timothy Busfield	Story by : Mark Goffman; Teleplay by : Aaron Sorkin	June 7, 2007	3T5068	Jenna Fischer; Gran Bel Fisher^{Continuation of "Breaking News".}
Jordan is rushed into surgery as the situation with Tom's brother grows more grim. It is discovered that the cause for Jordan's concern is a nuchal cord. While resting in the emergency room, she suffers spasms indicating eclampsia. Treated initially with magnesium sulfate (also called Epsom salts), it leaves the doctor with no choice but to proceed with an emergency caesarean section. This leads Danny to propose to Jordan on the spot, which she accepts. Matt and Harriet respond to Tom's situation in different ways, one with hope, the other with prayer. Flashbacks have Wes ill and interim show heads Matt and Danny forced on the difficult task of heading the show's first post-9/11 episode.
20	"K&R, Part 2"	Dave Chameides	Story by : Jack Gutowitz & Ian Reichbach; Teleplay by : Aaron Sorkin	June 14, 2007	3T5069	Jenna Fischer; Gran Bel Fisher^{Continuation of "Breaking News".}
The situation with Tom's brother continues to drag on through the night. After a news anchor describes the relationship between the brothers as "estranged", Simon lashes out harshly at the media. At the hospital, Jordan's baby is delivered, but the situation worsens as Jordan begins bleeding internally. Mary Tate counsels Matt that if Jordan were to die, Danny would have no rights regarding Jordan's child. Flashbacks depict Danny and Matt fighting with network brass over a yet-to-be-aired, post-9/11 sketch depicting the relationship between Hollywood and the White House.
21	"K&R, Part 3"	Timothy Busfield	Aaron Sorkin & Mark McKinney	June 21, 2007	3T5070	Jenna Fischer; Gran Bel Fisher^{Continuation of "Breaking News".} Jason Alexander; Sheryl Crow^{The host and musical guest on the show in the flashback scenes.}
Jordan's internal hemorrhaging has stopped, but her prolonged exposure may have led to a bacterial infection, leaving Harriet and Danny feeling helpless to do anything. Jack tries pressuring Simon into releasing a written apology to the media, which he firmly refuses to do. The military gains information that the terrorists may have executed one of the airmen, leading Mary Tate's K & R efforts to go forward. In addition to this, Mary Tate begins to draw up the paperwork that can make Danny the baby's legal guardian in the event of Jordan's death. Flashbacks reveal that Matt and Danny aired a sketch displaying the dubious relationship between the White House and Hollywood five weeks after 9/11, a sketch that angered many viewers. When Matt refused to release any apology, Jack threatened to fire them. This lack of principle led Matt and Danny to quit the show. Martin Sheen voices a conservative talk show host.
22	"What Kind of Day Has It Been"	Bradley Whitford	Aaron Sorkin	June 28, 2007	3T5071	Jenna Fischer; Gran Bel Fisher^{Continuation of "Breaking News".}
This series finale episode shares the title of the first season finales of both of Sorkin's two previous series, Sports Night and The West Wing as well as the series finale episode of his show to-follow The Newsroom. The long night for the cast finally comes to an end: Jordan, Danny, and the newborn finally become true family, Simon agrees with Jack to apologize for his harsh remarks, and the relationship between Matt and Harriet begins a new chapter. Most importantly, Tom's brother and his comrades are successfully saved and delivered into American hands. The final image in the show's run is the entire cast of Studio 60 looking back on the day's events, ready to start all over again come Monday.

== Reception ==
=== Critical reaction ===
The show received mixed to positive reviews from critics. Television critics named Studio 60 their "Best Overall New Program" in a poll conducted by Broadcasting and Cable, based on the pilot episode. In their 2006 year-end issue, the New York Daily News listed Studio 60 as number 6 on their best "Series of the Year" list, and it was also listed in best standout performances as number 9 for Matthew Perry. Glenn Garvin of the Miami Herald named Studio 60 as number 2 on his list of best "Series of the Year." Studio 60 earned a collective rating of 75 out of 100 based on 33 reviews by TV critics and received 8.2 out of 10 from 276 votes by users on Metacritic.

The pilot was seen by an average of 13.4 million total viewers in its initial airing on NBC, although it experienced significant viewer falloff from the first half-hour to the second half-hour, and the second episode's Nielsen ratings were down by 12% from the pilot. The erosion continued through episode 5, with a 43% viewer drop off from its premiere, but subsequently leveled off.

On October 27, 2006, NBC gave a conditional "vote of confidence" by ordering three additional scripts on top of the initial order of 13. Despite the order, Studio 60 performed poorly in the ratings, which led to speculation that the network was seriously considering canceling the show.

Gossip blogger Roger Friedman of Fox News reported on October 30, 2006, that cancellation of the show was imminent. This was denied the next day by an NBC representative who stated that the show "is profitable at this point" and that, rather than a cancellation, it was more likely that the timeslot would change.

On November 9, 2006, NBC announced that the show had been picked up for a full season, citing its favorable demographics as the reason. According to NBC's press release: "Studio 60 has consistently delivered some of the highest audience concentrations among all primetime network series in such key upscale categories as adults 18–49 living in homes with $75,000-plus and $100,000-plus incomes and in homes where the head of household has four or more years of college."

In its December 17, 2006, issue, Time listed Studio 60 as one of "5 Things That Went From Buzz to Bust", sharing the distinction with other "phenomena that captivated the media for a spell, then turned out to be less than huge." Entertainment Weekly named Studio 60 the worst TV show of 2006. Comedy writers were largely disdainful of Studio 60, with comments like "People in television, trust me, are not that smart", "[Sorkin] wants to get big ideas across and change people's minds. No comedians work that way. They go for the laughs first and the lesson second", and "[Saturday Night Live] is so dark, they could never show what actually happens there."

The New Yorker described the short-lived Studio 60 on the Sunset Strip as a show people loved to hate-watch, as "it was bad in a truly spectacular way—you could learn something from it, about self-righteous TV speechifying and failed satire and the dangers of letting a brilliant showrunner like [Aaron] Sorkin run loose to settle all his grudges in fictional form".

On July 19, 2007, the Academy of Television Arts & Sciences announced their nominations for the 2007 Primetime Emmy Awards. Studio 60 was nominated in five categories. The pilot episode earned three nominations: Outstanding Directing (Thomas Schlamme), Outstanding Cinematography for a Single-Camera Series, and Outstanding Casting in Dramatic Series. Both John Goodman and Eli Wallach were nominated Outstanding Guest Actor in Dramatic Series. Studio 60 Emmy nominations surpassed several other shows, such as Friday Night Lights and Dexter, which got two and three, respectively. The show also tied with CSI and 24.

=== U.S. scheduling ===
On December 2, 2006, NBC announced that Studio 60 would be sharing the Monday at 10 p.m. timeslot with The Black Donnellys; as a result, Studio 60 was on hiatus from December 4, 2006, to January 22, 2007. It then aired intermittently until February 26, 2007, when it was scheduled to take another hiatus.

On February 13, 2007, NBC announced that Studio 60 would go on hiatus one week early, and that the last episode would air on February 19, 2007. This was partially due to the show's delivering its lowest ratings to date on the Monday preceding the announcement.

During the hiatus on NBC, The Black Donnellys (premiered February 26), Thank God You're Here (premiered April 9), The Real Wedding Crashers (premiered April 23, after Thank God You're Here moved to Wednesdays), and Law & Order: Criminal Intent (aired its last two episodes of the season starting May 14) occupied the Monday 10 p.m. time period.

On April 2, 2007, NBC announced that Studio 60 would not reclaim its Monday at 10 p.m. time slot at the conclusion of The Black Donnellys run and that The Real Wedding Crashers, a reality show based on the popular movie, would occupy the timeslot from April 23, 2007, through the end of the TV season. However, on April 26, NBC announced that Studio 60 would return from its hiatus on Thursday, May 24, at 10:00 p.m.

Studio 60 was canceled on May 11, 2007, during the NBC upfront presentation.

=== After cancellation ===
In a 2011 reference to the cancelled Studio 60, Aaron Sorkin appeared in "Plan B", a fifth-season episode of 30 Rock; he played himself, depicted as looking for work alongside an also-struggling Liz Lemon. He refers to his achievements, such as The West Wing and The Social Network, but when Liz Lemon mentions Studio 60, he quickly replies, "Shut up!" During the March 2012 promotion of Bent, an NBC romantic comedy series starring Amanda Peet, Peet commented on what the issue was with Studio 60, saying it was "too expensive and there was too much anticipation. I guess all together we seemed like this arrogant monolith, but individually, none of us felt very arrogant."

In later years, the show gained more positive recognition, with critics praising Perry's performance in particular following the actor's death. Writing in The Guardian, Jack Seale said Perry "was better than anyone at nailing Sorkin’s turbo-speed dialogue and adept at finding subtler, gentler notes in the gaps between the lines than was possible in a sitcom. But the soul of Perry’s performance was in its closeness to his own personality."

== Television ratings ==
Chart showing ratings, 18–49 ratings, share and viewers for the show.

=== U.S. ratings ===
Weekly rankings based on Fast National ratings.

Season One (2006–2007)
#	Episode	Air Date	Rating	Share	18–49 Demographic	Viewers (in millions)	Rank
1	"Pilot"	September 18, 2006	8.6	14	5.0	13.14	# 22
2	"The Cold Open"	September 25, 2006	7.5	12	4.4	10.82	# 33
3	"The Focus Group"	October 2, 2006	6.0	10	3.5	8.85	# 47
4	"The West Coast Delay"	October 9, 2006	5.8	9	3.8	8.66	# 51
5	"The Long Lead Story"	October 16, 2006	5.3	8	3.1	7.74	# 55
6	"The Wrap Party"	October 23, 2006	5.1	8	3.2	7.72	# 60
7	"Nevada Day (1)"	November 6, 2006	4.8	8	3.3	7.67	# 56
8	"Nevada Day (2)"	November 13, 2006	5.0	8	3.2	7.58	# 58
9	"The Option Period"	November 20, 2006	4.7	8	3.1	7.17	# 60
10	"B-12"	November 27, 2006	4.8	8	3.3	7.27	# 60
11	"The Christmas Show"	December 4, 2006	4.9	8	3.0	7.33	# 52
12	"Monday"	January 22, 2007	5.3	8	3.2	7.25	# 48
13	"The Harriet Dinner – Part I"	January 29, 2007	4.8	7	3.0	6.86	# 53
14	"The Harriet Dinner – Part II"	February 5, 2007	4.6	7	3.2	7.00	# 59
15	"The Friday Night Slaughter"	February 12, 2007	4.3	7	2.8	6.39	# 68
16	"4AM Miracle"	February 19, 2007	4.1	7	2.6	6.10	# 63
17	"The Disaster Show"	May 24, 2007	2.7	5	1.7	3.90	# 76
18	"Breaking News"	May 31, 2007	2.9	5	1.6	4.08	n/a
19	"K&R"	June 7, 2007	3.1	5	1.7	4.35	# 66
20	"K&R – Part II"	June 14, 2007	3.0	6	1.7	4.25	n/a
21	"K&R – Part III"	June 21, 2007	3.0	5	1.8	4.42	# 53
22	"What Kind of Day Has It Been"	June 28, 2007	2.7	5	2.0	4.20	n/a

Key: Rating is the estimated percentage of all TVs tuned to the show, share is the percentage of all TVs in use that are tuned in. Viewers is the estimated number of actual people watching, in millions, while ranking is the approximate ranking of the show against all prime-time TV shows for the week (Monday through the following Sunday).

While the show premiered with high ratings, there was a large drop during the second half. This trend continued through nearly every episode of the show.

=== Seasonal ratings ===
Seasonal rankings (based on average total viewers per episode) of Studio 60 on the Sunset Strip on NBC:

Note: Each U.S. network television season starts in late September and ends in late May, which coincides with the completion of May sweeps.

Season	Timeslot (EDT)	Series Premiere	Series Finale	TV Season	Rank	Viewers (in millions)	18–49 Rating/Share (rank)
1	Monday 10:00 P.M. (September 18, 2006 – February 19, 2007) Thursday 10:00 P.M. (May 24, 2007 – June 28, 2007)	September 18, 2006	June 28, 2007	2006–2007	#61	8.5	3.6/9 (#41)

=== DVR ratings ===
On December 29, 2006, Nielsen Media Research reported the results of having, for the first time, monitored viewers who use a Digital Video Recorder to pre-record shows for later viewing. According to the Nielsen numbers, adding these viewers increased Studio 60's ratings the most in percentage terms of all network shows. These ratings, called "live plus seven", include all viewers who use a DVR to record the show and then watch it within a week of its initial airing.

According to Nielsen, Studio 60 added nearly 11%, or almost a million viewers, to its total every week as a result of these "live plus seven" viewers.

According to Medialife Magazine, "The live-plus-seven-day rating for NBC's Studio 60 on the Sunset Strip is 136% higher than its live rating in DVR homes."

== Awards ==
=== Wins ===
2006

- Broadcasting and Cable pool — Best Overall New Program.

2007

- Banff World Television Festival — Continuing Series – for the episode "Pilot."
- Emmy Awards — Outstanding Guest Actor in a Drama Series – John Goodman: Nevada Day Parts 1-2.

=== Nominations ===
2006

- Satellite Awards — Outstanding Actor in a Series, Drama – Matthew Perry
- Satellite Awards — Outstanding Actor in a Series, Drama – Bradley Whitford
- Satellite Awards — Outstanding Actress in a Series, Drama – Amanda Peet
- Satellite Awards — Outstanding Actress in a Series, Drama – Sarah Paulson

2007

- Emmy Awards — Outstanding Directing for a Drama Series: Pilot, directed by Thomas Schlamme
- Emmy Awards — Outstanding Cinematography for a Single-Camera Series: Pilot
- Emmy Awards — Outstanding Casting for a Drama Series
- Emmy Awards — Outstanding Guest Actor in a Drama Series – Eli Wallach
- Writers Guild of America Awards — Best Overall New Program
- Writers Guild of America Awards — Episodic Drama – for the episode "Pilot", written by Aaron Sorkin
- Directors Guild of America Awards — Outstanding Directorial Achievement in Dramatic Series, Night: for the episode "Pilot", directed by Thomas Schlamme
- Golden Globe Awards — Best Performance by an Actress in a Supporting Role in a Series, Mini-Series or Motion Picture Made for Television – Sarah Paulson
- Art Directors Guild — Excellence in production design single camera television series – for the episode "Pilot", Production Design by Carlos Barbosa
- American Society of Cinematographers — episodic television – Thomas Del Ruth
- ICG Publicists Awards — Outstanding Television Series

== Home media ==
=== DVD release ===
On June 27, 2007, the day before the airing of the show's final episode, Warner Home Video announced an October 16 release date for the Studio 60 on the Sunset Strip: Complete Series DVD set.

=== Alternative availability ===
NBC made the pilot episode of Studio 60 available on DVD to Netflix subscribers on August 5, 2006. The DVD also includes the pilot episode for Kidnapped, another show which aired on NBC in the fall and also got canceled. AOL also premiered the first episode of Studio 60 in its entirety on its online television channel.

The pilot episode was screened to the general public for the first time at the 31st MediaGuardian Edinburgh International Television Festival, a British industry and media event held annually over the August bank holiday weekend (August 25–27, 2006). The pilot episode was screened outdoors on a "giant billboard style screen" in Conference Square, next to the Edinburgh International Conference Centre.
