= Dave Chameides =

American steadicam operator and director

- Born: West Hartford, Connecticut, U.S.
- Other name: Sustainable Dave
- Occupations: Steadicam operator, Camera operator, Director, environmental educator
- Years active: 1992–present

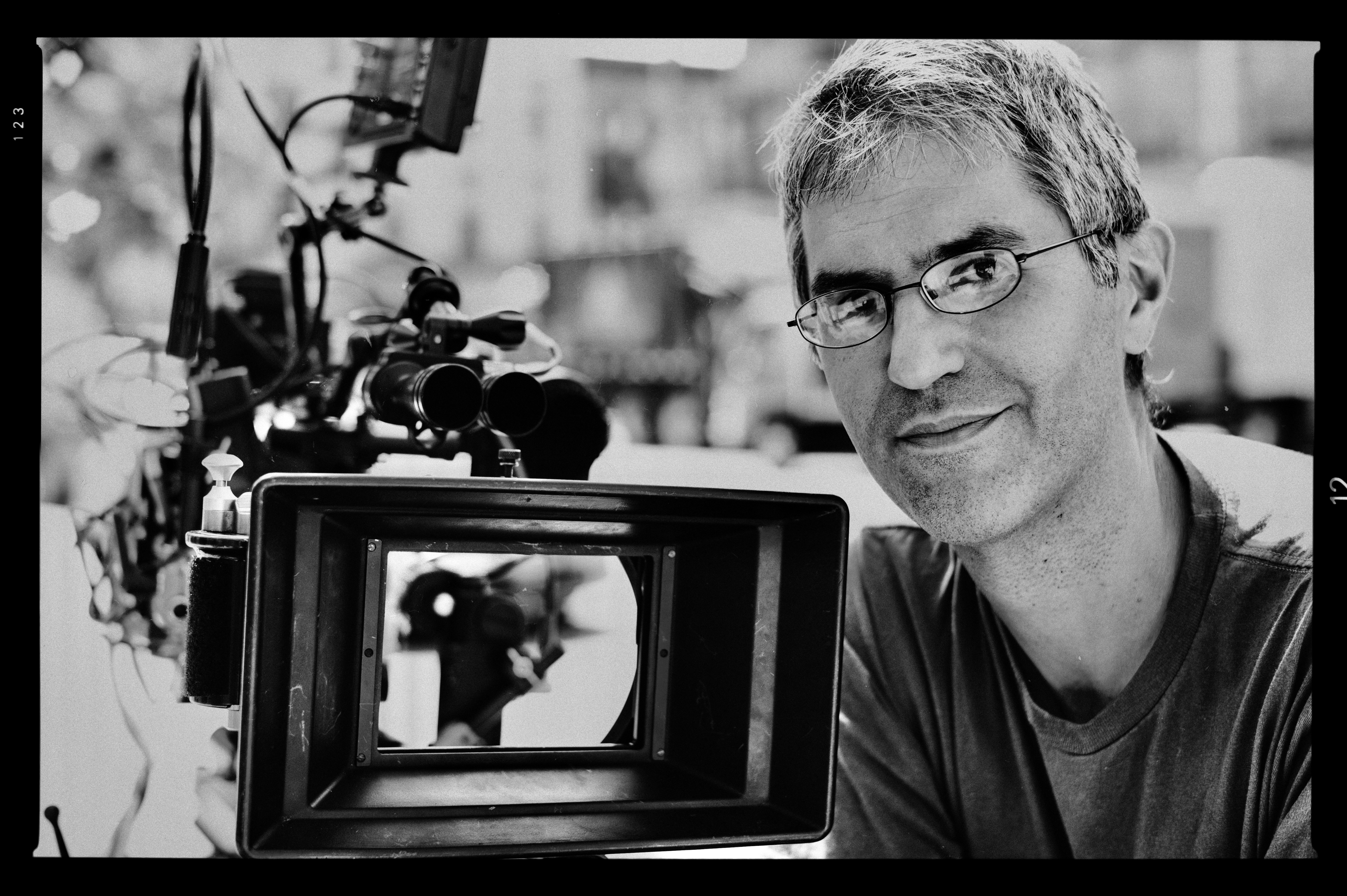

Dave Chameides is an American steadicam operator and occasional television director. His work on the 2000 live televised play Fail Safe and on "Ambush", a live fourth season episode of ER earned him two Emmy Awards.

As a director, his work includes episodes of ER, Third Watch and Studio 60 on the Sunset Strip as well as numerous commercials and music videos.

Chameides has also worked as a camera operator on a number of notable films, including From Dusk till Dawn, St. Vincent, Donnie Darko, Shame, The Harder They Fall, and The Tragedy of Macbeth and notable television shows such as ER, The West Wing, and Ozark.

He was nominated for an SOC Feature Film Operator of the Year Award for his work on the film St. Vincent in 2014 and won the SOC Television Operator of the Year Award in 2023 for his work on Ozark with B Camera operator Christian Trova. He has also won two Emmy Awards, one for his work on the live episode of ER in 1998 and one for his work on Failsafe:Live in 2000, and was featured on the awards show in 1997.

Chameides has been an active member of the National Executive Board of ICG Local 600, The International Cinematographers Guild, spending time there as the chair of the safety committee and has also worked as a member of the Educational Committee for the Society of Camera Operators.
