= Nate Torrence =

American actor (born 1977)

- Born: Nathan Andrew Torrence; December 1, 1977 (age 48); Canton, Ohio, U.S.
- Occupation: Actor
- Years active: 2003–present
- Spouse: Christie Mullet
- Children: 2

Nathan Andrew Torrence (born December 1, 1977) is an American actor. He is known for several television and film roles, most notably including Dylan Killington from NBC's Studio 60 on the Sunset Strip (2006–2007), Devon from She's Out of My League (2010), Wade Bailey from HBO‘s Hello Ladies (2013–2014), and for voicing the character of Benjamin Clawhauser in Disney's Zootopia franchise (2016–present).

== Early life ==
Torrence was born Nathan Torrence on December 1, 1977, in Canton, Ohio, to Kathy (née Travers) and Bernie Torrence, where he began his education. Torrence attended Hiland High School in Berlin, Ohio, and went on to attend Kent State University. His family used to own and operate a bed and breakfast in Berlin. After studying with Second City's Players Workshop in Chicago, Illinois, Torrence began touring in a comedy troupe called Corn, Beef and Cabbage, where he wrote, improvised and performed with his older brother, Jay and friend Josh Ruth. Torrence additionally studied improv at Second City in Cleveland and in Los Angeles, and The Groundlings and Comedy Sportz in Los Angeles.

== Career ==
Torrence has appeared on television programs including CSI: Crime Scene Investigation, Malcolm in the Middle, How I Met Your Mother, Las Vegas, Brooklyn Nine-Nine, House M.D., and Ghost Whisperer. He had a recurring role as Dylan Killington on the NBC drama Studio 60 on the Sunset Strip and played Roman Cohen in the ABC network short-lived comedy Mr. Sunshine, a midseason replacement for the 2010-11 television season.

He is perhaps best known for his role as a credit card customer service representative with David Spade, in the Capital One "What's In Your Wallet" advertising campaign. He has also appeared in several other commercials, including for Enterprise Rent-A-Car, Volkswagen, Golden Grahams, H-E-B, and NFL.com.

In December 2006, Torrence appeared in a season two episode of Top Chef on Bravo TV. The contestants were showcasing holiday food; Nate Torrence was one of the tasters, although he is not credited.

He played Lloyd, a lab assistant, in the film Get Smart and reprised the role to star in the direct-to-DVD spinoff Get Smart's Bruce and Lloyd: Out of Control. Torrence has also played a crazy shirtless boxer on Reno 911!, and Devon in the 2010 comedy She's Out of My League.

He voices Chuck on the animated show Motorcity and played Wade Bailey in the HBO series Hello Ladies. In the 2013-14 TV season, he was the recurring character "James" on the ABC comedy Super Fun Night, and he guest-starred on a 2014 Brooklyn Nine-Nine episode as a costumed vigilante named "Super Dan". Torrence appeared as Eric Lewandowski on the Fox sitcom Weird Loners and voices Ferguson on the animated show Star vs. the Forces of Evil. In 2015, he appeared on the episode of Supernatural entitled "Just My Imagination" as Sully, Sam's imaginary friend. In 2016, he had a voice role in the animated hit Zootopia, as Officer Benjamin Clawhauser.

== Personal life ==
Torrance is married to Christie Mullet and together they have two children.

== Filmography ==
=== Film ===
Year	Title	Role	Notes
2005	Little Athens	Cardplayer	
2005	Suits on the Loose	Elder Lewis	
2007	Marksman	Harold Grubenstein	Short film
2007	Driftwood	Jimmy	Short film
2008	Get Smart	Lloyd	
2008	Get Smart's Bruce and Lloyd: Out of Control	Lloyd	Direct to video
2008	My Best Friend's Girl	Craig	
2010	She's Out of My League	Devon	
2011	The Big Year	Ted Simkin	
2012	We Think Nate Torrence is Dead	Himself	Short film
2016	Zootopia	Officer Benjamin Clawhauser (voice)	
2018	Game Over, Man!	Security Guard	Uncredited
2020	The Very Excellent Mr. Dundee	Luke	
2021	Christmas vs. the Walters	Shelly	
2025	Zootopia 2	Officer Benjamin Clawhauser (voice)	
2026	Swapped	Lodd (voice)	

=== Television ===
Year	Title	Role	Notes
2003	CSI: Crime Scene Investigation	Daniel O'Hannissey	Episode: "All for Our Country"
2003	The Mullets	Tud	Episode: "Smoke on the Water"
2004	Malcolm in the Middle	Private Turner	Episode: "Reese Joins the Army"
2004	Quintuplets	Pizza Guy	Episode: "Boobs on the Run"
2004	House	Young Man	Episode: "Maternity"
2005	Girlfriends	Movie Goer	Episode: "P.D.A - D.O.A"
2005	Las Vegas	Keith	Episode: "Fake the Money and Run"
2005	Ghost Whisperer	Waiter	2 episodes
2005	One on One	Water Guy	Episode: "House Dad"
2006	One on One	Ralph	Episode: "Ghost, Interrupted"
2006	How I Met Your Mother	Clark Butterfield	Episode: "Milk"; credited as "Butterfield"
2006–07	Studio 60 on the Sunset Strip	Dylan Killington	19 episodes
2008	Reno 911!	Crazy Shirtless Boxing Man	Episode: "Baghdad 911"
2008	The End of Steve	Nathan	Television film
2011	Mr. Sunshine	Roman Cohen	13 episodes
2012	Happy Endings	Slacker Buddy	Episode: "The Shrink, the Dare, Her Date and Her Brother"
2012	Are You There, Chelsea?	Captain Steve	Episode: "The Gynecologist"
2012–13	Motorcity	Chuck (voice)	16 episodes
2013–14	Super Fun Night	James	5 episodes
2013–14	Hello Ladies	Wade	9 episodes
2014	Brooklyn Nine-Nine	Super Dan	Episode: "Full Boyle"
2014	The Millers	Devin	Episode: "Sex Ed Dolan"
2015	Weird Loners	Eric Landowski	6 episodes
2015	Royal Pains	Josh Dunlap	Episode: "False Start"
2015–19	Star vs. the Forces of Evil	Ferguson (voice)	8 episodes
2015	Gortimer Gibbon's Life on Normal Street	Iggy	Episode: "Ranger and the Very Real Imaginary Friend"
2015	Supernatural	Sully	Episode: "Just My Imagination"
2016	Superstore	Kyle	3 episodes
2017	Angie Tribeca	Kurt Piedmont	Episode: "Brockman Turner Overdrive"
2018–19	Prince of Peoria	Vice Principal Chipler	3 episodes
2019	For the People	Doug Bradshaw	Episode: "The Vast, Immovable Object"
2019	Fast Layne	VIN (voice)	8 episodes
2022	The Mighty Ducks: Game Changers	Gabe Nordlinger	Episode: "Spirit of the Ducks"
2022	Zootopia+	Officer Benjamin Clawhauser (voice)	Episode: "So You Think You Can Prance?"
2023	Chicago Med	Tim Boyd	Episode: "The Winds of Change Are Starting to Blow"
2023	Strange Planet	Group Roll Machine Operator (voice)	Episode: "The Flying Machine"
2023, 2026	Pupstruction	Chameleo (voice)	2 episodes
2025	St. Denis Medical	Danny	Episode: "People Just Say Stuff Online"
2026	Sofia the First: Royal Magic	Pepper (voice)	Recurring role
