= Toys (novel) =

2011 novel by James Patterson and Neil McMahon

- First edition
- Author: James Patterson; Neil McMahon
- Genre: Science fiction Mystery fiction Thriller
- Publisher: Little, Brown and Company
- Publication date: December 1, 2011 (hardback)
- Publication place: United States
- Pages: 416
- ISBN: 0316097365

Toys is a novel by James Patterson and Neil McMahon published by Little, Brown and Company in December 2011. Set in the future where humans are seen as an inferior species, Toys revolves around an "Elite" Hays Baker, who is endowed with superhuman attributes and is a high-ranking government official; however, in an unexpected turn of events, he is made to flee for his life.

== Plot ==
Some time in the future, a new class of super-powered humans known as "Elites" has assumed rule over society, and normal humans are deemed to be inferior creatures; "Elites" are grown in tubes and thus do not have navels. In 2061, Hays Baker works for the Agency of Change, and is married to Lizbeth, with whom he has two children. One day, however, his life is torn apart when he discovers that he is in fact a human, despite his superhuman abilities. Soon enough he becomes a fugitive, and Baker has to fight to save his life.

== Reception ==
Joe Hartlaub of The Book Report described the novel as "ambitious" and reminiscent of works including the novels Ubik and Do Androids Dream of Electric Sheep? by Philip K. Dick.
