= Camille Chen =

Taiwanese-American actress (b. 1979)

- 卡蜜兒陳
- Born: September 1, 1979 (age 47); Taipei, Taiwan
- Education: University of Texas at Austin (BA)
- Occupation: Actress
- Years active: 1999–present
- Known for: portraying Samantha Li in Studio 60 on the Sunset Strip
- Spouse: Christian Anderson (m. 2017)
- Children: 1
- Website: www.camillechen.com

Camille Chen (Chinese: 卡蜜兒陳; born September 1, 1979) is a Taiwanese-American actress.

== Early life and education ==
Born in Taiwan but raised in the U.S., Chen attended the University of Texas at Austin and then began her career in show business, doing voiceover work for the English version of anime television series such as Lost Universe and Devil Lady.

== Career ==
Chen's first feature film roles were uncredited appearances as Miss New Hampshire in the 2000 film, Miss Congeniality, and as a cheerleader in the 2002 film, The New Guy.

From 2006 to 2007, Chen had a regular recurring role as Samantha Li on Studio 60 on the Sunset Strip. She guest-starred on the 2009 episode of Law & Order, "Just a Girl in the World" as Emma Kim, first thought to be the target of a serial killer, but later discovered to be the murderer herself. On stage, Chen portrayed "Christmas Eve" in a 2012 Los Angeles production of Avenue Q.

In 2016, Chen starred in Poor Todd, an independent pilot selected by the New York Television Festival for its Independent Pilot Competition. In 2017, she had a prominent guest-starring role in an episode of the TV series Teachers, playing Mrs. Chan, "a priggish mother of two and president of the parent group Two Million Moms".

In a 2017 interview by The Guardian, she addressed barriers facing Asian actors:

Camille Chen... said she had been getting auditions for a wide range of parts and that her ethnicity had become an advantage as more industry leaders recognized the importance of diversity. But despite the significant progress – when she started her career 13 years ago, she felt she had no choice but to go up for the masseuses and prostitutes – Chen acknowledged that she never got to audition for principal characters in films. "I wish they would open their minds to having Asian Americans lead."

Chen's performance as a "tactless doctor" in a bit part in the 2018 film Game Night was reviewed in The Village Voice as "a deadpan gift", in a scene described by The Hollywood Reporter as "one of Game Night's funnier scenes", and by The New Yorker as making "memorable impressions". Also in 2018, she guest-starred in multiple episodes of Unsolved: The Murders of Tupac and the Notorious B.I.G. as robbery-homicide department secretary Grace Kim. She had a starring role in the independent pilot "I Was a Teenage Pillow Queen", premiered in September 2018 at the Tribeca TV Festival, and in November 2018, she guest-starred in two episodes of Single Parents. In January 2019, Chen guest-starred on an episode of God Friended Me.

She has also appeared in about two dozen advertising campaigns, including some prominent commercial roles.

In 2020, Chen appeared as a guest on the Studio 60 on the Sunset Strip marathon fundraiser episode of The George Lucas Talk Show. In 2021, she guest starred on the series finale of Rebel. In 2023, she appeared in the film, Renfield, as the FBI agent sister of Awkwafina's New Orleans police officer.

== Work ==
=== Feature films ===
Year	Title	Role	Notes
2002	The New Guy	Cheerleader	
2003	Hallow's End	Lily Moore	
2003	Sexless	Carissa	also makeup artist
2003	Spy Kids 3-D: Game Over	Processor	
2018	Game Night	Dr. Chin	
2019	Yesterday	Wendy	
2023	Renfield	Kate Quincy	

=== Short films ===
Year	Title	Role
2002	Jason and the High Cost of Electricity	Weathergirl
2002	Triple Threat	Jenika
2004	Elegy	Hua Lee
2005	Passages	Gina
2005	Heavenly Beauties	Asian Beauty
2006	Spilled	Laura Lee

=== Television ===
Year	Title	Role	Notes
2005	Barbershop: The Series	Michelle	2 episodes
2005	Without a Trace	Waitress	Episode: "Freefall"
2006-7	Studio 60 on the Sunset Strip	Samantha Li	Series regular
2007	Derek and Simon: The Show	Camille	1 episode
2007	Ghost Whisperer	Jenna Chen	1 episode
2009	Numb3rs	Zi-Zi	1 episode
2009	Meteor	Lieutenant Quigley	2 episodes
2009	Law & Order	Emma Kim	Episode: "Just a Girl in the World"
2010	Private Practice	Lucia	1 episode
2010	Eagles in the Chicken Coop	Pamela Holdsbar	1 episode
2010	Grey's Anatomy	Kerry Schultz	1 episode
2011	Californication	Heather Tracy	1 episode
2011	CSI: Crime Scene Investigation	Alice Katsu	1 episode
2011	Law & Order: Criminal Intent	Dr. Maya Zhuang	1 episode
2011	Royal Pains	Anna	1 episode
2012	Touch	Serena	1 episode
2013	American Horror Story: Asylum	April Mayfield	1 episode
2013	Grimm	Jenna Marshall	Episode: "Nameless"
2014	Garfunkel & Oates	Caroline	1 episode
2015	Backstrom	Celia Gu	1 episode
2016	2 Broke Girls	Evie	1 episode
2017	House Hunters Renovation	Herself	Season 10, Episode 3
2017	Lucifer	Sheila Vestal	Episode: "The One With The Baby Carrot"
2017	Teachers	Mrs. Chan	1 episode
2018	Unsolved: The Murders of Tupac and the Notorious B.I.G.	Grace Kim	4 episodes
2018	Single Parents	Lex	2 episodes
2019	God Friended Me	Heidi James	1 episode
2019	Carol's Second Act	Sharon	1 episode
2020	The George Lucas Talk Show	Herself	Stu-D2 1138 on the Binary Sunset Sith (Studio 60 on the Sunset Strip marathon)
2021	Rebel	Naomi Lee	1 episode

=== Theater ===
Year	Title	Role
2025	Eureka Day	Meiko

=== Voice ===
Year	Title	Role
1997	Lost Universe	Nina Mercury/Little Girl
1998	Devil Lady	Kazumi Takiura
1999	Eden's Bowy	Elisiss
2002	Jing: King of Bandits	Fino

=== Select television commercials ===
Year	Title	Role
2013	Wendy's	one of the girls at the pool with Wendy
2013	Motorola - Moto X	Sophie, the phone-accessorizing girl
2013	State Farm	girl buying a new purse who doesn't have State Farm
2015	Experian	lady negotiating for the best furniture deal
2016	McDonald's	Mom with daughter
2019	Red Baron	Mom trying to prepare dinner
2022	GEICO	Motorcycle Rider/Rebel
2022	Verizon	Mother in family of 4
