= Drop Shot =

Crime novel by Harlan Coben

First edition (publ. Dell Books)

Drop Shot is a murder mystery by Harlan Coben. It is the second novel featuring Myron Bolitar. It was published in 1996.

== Plot ==
A young woman is shot in cold blood, her lifeless body dumped outside the stadium at the height of the US Open. At one point, her tennis career had skyrocketed. Now headlines were being made by a different young player from the wrong side of the tracks.

When Myron Bolitar investigates the killing, he uncovers a connection between the two players and a six-year-old murder at an exclusive club. Suddenly, Myron is in over his head. And with a dirty senator, a jealous mother, and the mob all drawn into the case, he finds himself playing the most dangerous game of all.

== Main characters ==
- Myron Bolitar : Ex-basketball player, currently works as sports agent. Owner of MB SportReps.
- Windsor "Win" Horne Lockwood, III : Myron's best friend and owner of Lock-Horne Investments & Securities.
- Esperanza Diaz : one of Myron's best friends, currently working for him as an assistant.
- Jessica Culver : Myron's girlfriend.
- Duane Richwood : Myron's client, and a tennis player playing in the U.S. Open.
