= Deal Breaker =

1995 thriller novel by Harlan Coben

- Author: Harlan Coben
- Language: English
- Publisher: Dell Publishing
- Publication place: United States
- Pages: 400

Deal Breaker is a 1995 thriller novel by Harlan Coben and is the first in his Myron Bolitar series.

== Plot ==
Investigator and sports agent Myron Bolitar is working on a deal that should make him rich. So is Christian Steele, a rookie quarterback and Myron's prized client. But when Christian gets a phone call from a former girlfriend, a woman whom everyone including the police believes is dead, the deal starts to go sour. Suddenly Myron is plunged into a mystery of sex and blackmail. Trying to unravel the truth about a family's tragedy, a woman's secret and a man's lies, Myron is up against the criminal forces of his sports business.

== Film adaptation ==
A film adaptation is in development after the rights to the Myron Bolitar novels was bought by Columbia Pictures.

== Awards ==
The novel won the 1996 Anthony Award and received an Edgar award nomination in the "Best Paperback original" category.
