= Win (novel) =

American mystery/thriller novel

- First edition (US)
- Author: Harlan Coben
- Language: English
- Series: Spinoff of Myron Bolitar series
- Genre: Mystery, thriller
- Publisher: Penguin Books (UK), Grand Central Publishing (US)
- Publication date: Hardback: March 2021 (Grand Central Publishing and Penguin Books)
- Publication place: United States
- Media type: Print (hardback)
- Pages: 371 pp (US hardback)

Win is a 2021 mystery/thriller novel by American writer Harlan Coben. Following eleven novels in Coben’s series featuring sports agent-turned-crime solver Myron Bolitar, this is the first novel to completely feature Myron’s best friend and sidekick, the wealthy and mysterious Windsor "Win" Horne Lockwood III. This is the second time Coben uses first-person narrative for this character. The 2016 Myron Bolitar story Home had multiple chapters told from Win’s perspective.

== Plot summary ==
An elderly man who appears to be a recluse and hoarder is found murdered in his luxury Manhattan apartment. The FBI contacts Win when two items connected to the Lockwood family – an original Johannes Vermeer painting that was stolen 20 years ago and a suitcase bearing Win’s initials – are found in the apartment. The FBI’s interest becomes clear when the victim is revealed to be Ry Strauss, one-time member of the underground group known as the Jane Street Six, who were responsible for a fire bomb attack that killed seven people in the early 1970s.

Win runs his own concurrent investigation, as he "has three things the FBI doesn't; a personal connection to the case; an ungodly fortune; and his own unique brand of justice." He soon questions his cousin Patricia. Not long before her father, Aldrich Lockwood, was murdered, an 18-year old Patricia was abducted by two people and taken to a place she dubbed the Hut of Horrors, where she was repeatedly abused before escaping. Patricia reveals that the abductors ordered her to pack a suitcase, the very same suitcase found in Strauss’ apartment. Win’s investigation has him searching for the four remaining members of the Jane Street Six, with two known to be deceased, while he also digs into family secrets over his father’s objections.

Along the way, a vigilante act Win carried out against a basketball coach and abuser leads to repercussions, nearly costing Win his life.

== Main characters ==
- Windsor "Win" Horne Lockwood III: wealthy owner of Locke-Horne Investments & Securities; originally introduced as Myron Bolitar's best friend and sidekick
- Windsor Horne Lockwood II: Win's father, who left the family business to his son
- Patricia Lockwood: Win’s cousin, daughter of Windsor II’s deceased brother, Aldrich
- PT: A retired FBI agent with a connection to Win who worked on the original Jane Street Six case
- Kabir: Win's personal assistant
- Ema Wyatt: A high school senior who is the daughter of Win and actress Angelica Wyatt

== Reviews ==
A BookPage review notes that: "In Harlan Coben’s suspenseful and oft-surprising Win, the rakish titular character explains that he has long had to contend with negative assumptions due to his name, slight frame and regal bearing. Even this is an advantage, however: It’s caused him to cultivate exceptional combat skills. This has made him an excellent sidekick to Myron Bolitar, the sports agent-turned-investigator at the forefront of 11 of Coben’s novels thus far. For the first time since readers met Win in 1995, the 'preternaturally overconfident' sidekick emerges from the shadows to take center stage. His origin story is a departure from Coben’s Bolitar-universe narrative norm, one that readers will find intriguing thanks to a voice that is less open and more calculating, bolstered by a largely misanthropic worldview.”

A review by What's Better Than Books states that, for long-time Coben fans, Win is "a book that was undoubtedly long overdue, eagerly anticipated, and extremely satisfying." Meanwhile, reviewer Robert Dex of the Evening Standard notes, "The emotionless vigilante toying with the world from behind his vast personal wealth and self-regard is someone some readers might not want to spend almost 400 pages with."
