= Common Ground (2000 film) =

- Directed by: Donna Deitch
- Written by: Paula Vogel (segment "A Friend of Dorothy's"); Terrence McNally (segment "Mr. Roberts"); Harvey Fierstein (segment "Andy & Amos")
- Produced by: Brian Kerwin; A.D. Oppenheim
- Starring: Edward Asner; Beau Bridges; Harvey Fierstein; Brian Kerwin; Margot Kidder; James LeGros; Brittany Murphy; Jason Priestley; Mimi Rogers; Helen Shaver; Eric Stoltz; Jonathan Taylor Thomas; Steven Weber
- Distributed by: Showtime
- Release date: January 29, 2000
- Running time: 105 minutes
- Country: United States
- Language: English

Common Ground is a 2000 Showtime television film directed by Donna Deitch and written by Paula Vogel, Terrence McNally and Harvey Fierstein.

== Plot ==
=== "A Friend of Dorothy's" ===
In the 1950s, Dorothy Nelson (Brittany Murphy) joins the United States Navy where she meets the Friends of Dorothy, a code name for a group of gay and lesbian sailors. She meets Billy (Jason Priestley), who takes her to an interracial nightclub that accepts gay people. However, the NIS raids the club, and Dorothy is among those servicemembers who receive a blue discharge for "sexual perversion". Returning to Homer, she tries to restart her life as a public school teacher, but her unfavorable discharge prevents her from getting a job. When her homosexuality becomes public knowledge, Dorothy's mother expels her from the house, forcing her to seek shelter at a family friend's grocery store. However, her presence drives away the customers, and the friend has no choice but to ask her to leave. An independent-minded woman named Janet (Helen Shaver) at the local diner defends her against bullies chasing her and lets her spend the night. She calls a friend in New York City's bohemian Greenwich Village to take Dorothy in for a week, advising her that moving to a place like that is the best way for her to be free to be herself. Dorothy permanently leaves Homer on a bus the next morning.

=== "Mr. Roberts" ===
The second story flashes forward to the town of Homer in the 1970s, towards the end of the Vietnam War. There, a closeted gay high school French teacher, Mr. Roberts (Steven Weber), has a student named Toby Anderson (Jonathan Taylor Thomas), who is on the verge of coming out of the closet, and who he suspects wishes to confide in him. Roberts must keep his homosexuality a secret for fear of losing his job, but his live-in boyfriend Gus (Scott McCord) pressures him to set a good example for the students by illustrating the importance of tolerance and justice. Toby visits a prostitute referred to him by his swim coach, thinking that she might help him "become a man", but instead she gives him some good advice about being himself.

After Toby is sexually assaulted by bullies in the locker room and discovered by Roberts, Roberts decides to finally come out to his students, and lecturing them on the evils of bias-motivated hatred. Toby graduates high school and leaves Homer to attend Harvard.

=== "Andy and Amos" ===
The final short story takes place in the present day (2000), when a father and the townspeople have to come to terms with the fact that two men will be getting married during a commitment ceremony to be held in the town. Ira (Ed Asner), the father, is planning to lead a protest march against the wedding, while his son, Amos (James LeGros), is nervous about getting married and going against the cultural stereotype of gay men. The film ends on a positive note, with father and son reconciling and the wedding taking place as scheduled.

== Cast ==
- Edward Asner as Ira
- Beau Bridges as Father Leon
- Harvey Fierstein as Don
- Brian Kerwin as Chuck Dawson
- Margot Kidder as Mrs. Nelson
- Erik Knudsen as Young Johnny Burroughs
- James LeGros as Amos
- Brittany Murphy as Dorothy Nelson
- Jason Priestley as Billy
- Mimi Rogers as McPherson
- Helen Shaver as Janet
- Eric Stoltz as Johnny Burroughs
- Jonathan Taylor Thomas as Tobias "Toby" Anderson
- Steven Weber as Gil Roberts
- Scott McCord as Gus
- Caterina Scorsone as Peggy

== Production ==
A Friend of Dorothy's was written by Paula Vogel; Mr. Roberts was written by Terrence McNally; and Andy & Amos was written by Harvey Fierstein.

The plays star Brittany Murphy, Jason Priestley, Steven Weber, Jonathan Taylor Thomas, Edward Asner and James LeGros. The film contains three short stories about gay Americans during different time periods in the fictional town of Homer, Connecticut, and their efforts to find "common ground" or respect from the heterosexual majority.
