= List of Studio 60 on the Sunset Strip characters =

This article contains summaries of characters appearing on the TV series Studio 60 on the Sunset Strip.

== Major roles ==
Busfield, Corddry, Paulson, Hughley, Weber, Perry, Peet, Whitford

Danny Tripp (Bradley Whitford) is a producer who takes over show-running duties with Matt Albie, his long-time friend, and who worked on the show four years prior, before leaving with Matt over disagreements with network executives. In the pilot, it is revealed that he has a history of alcoholism and drug problems, specifically with cocaine, and recently suffered a relapse after 11 years of sobriety. Danny has to complete 18 months of clean drug tests to obtain completion bonds as a film director; while this information was confidential, Jordan McDeere discovers this via a personal contact and offers Danny a two-year contract of convenience on Studio 60. He is twice-divorced. Danny claims to be the smarter of the Matt and Danny duo, a contention Matt does not argue with.

Danny is apparently largely based on Aaron Sorkin's frequent collaborator and Studio 60 executive producer Thomas Schlamme, although Danny's drug relapse corresponds with Sorkin's personal history.

Matt Albie (Matthew Perry) is a former head writer for Studio 60 who in the show's pilot episode, is asked to return when executive producer Wes Mendell is fired. With Danny, Matt has gone from strength to strength, with the pair going onto films and Matt even winning a Writer's Guild Award on the night featured in the pilot. It is because of his loyalty to his friend and his history with Studio 60 that Matt accepts the position. This also puts him in an awkward position; he has recently ended a relationship with Studio 60 star Harriet Hayes, for whom he still holds strong personal feelings. Despite his Jewish heritage, he is an atheist and has liberal political leanings, which causes tension between him and Harriet. In "The West Coast Delay", it is revealed that he was forced out of his prior role on the show for supporting talk show host Bill Maher in the light of comments that Maher made following the September 11 terrorist attacks.

Jordan McDeere (Amanda Peet) is the recently promoted President for Entertainment Programming for the network NBS (National Broadcasting System) of which Studio 60 is the flagship show. She is described in the pilot script as an "instantly likeable 30-something" and "someone who every man's wife can find an irrational reason to hate". While Jordan's previous credentials are impressive, she knows that confidence in her is not very high (on the pilot, she mentions that on the day of the announcement of her hiring, the share price of NBS's parent company instantly took a 3/8 point dip) and the pressure on her to deliver is strong, with particularly intense scrutiny coming from network chairman Jack Rudolph. In the pilot, Jordan is responsible for the hiring of Danny and Matt, knowing of the pair's abrasive history with the show (and Jack). In "The Cold Open", Jordan proposes a policy of charging a 20% "cowardice fee" to advertisers who had acquiesced to boycotts by the Christian right but came back after the boycotted show in question turned out to be successful. In "The Focus Group", Jack reveals that her ex-husband is working on a tell-all book about her. At one wrap party, Danny told Jordan, "You look like one of them [network executives] but talk like one of us", due to her willingness to side with the talent in arguments. On October 20, 2006, Peet revealed on The Tonight Show with Jay Leno that McDeere is loosely based on Jamie Tarses. Peet's real-life pregnancy was written into the show, with Jordan being pregnant by an ex-boyfriend.

Harriet Hayes (Sarah Paulson) is a "multi-talented" performer and one of the "Big Three" main stars of Studio 60. As she describes to journalist Martha O'Dell in "The Long Lead Story", Harriet was born in Brighton, Michigan — and uses her middle name because a Hannah Hayes was already registered in the Screen Actors Guild. She is an evangelical Baptist and has recorded a successful album of spiritual music. In the pilot, the recent ending of her romantic relationship with Matt Albie is suggested to have been caused by her appearance on The 700 Club, where she promoted her album. In the pilot, Harriet stood by the controversial "Crazy Christians" sketch and its contents, demonstrating fierce loyalty to the show. She tells Tom that rather than being offended by "Crazy Christians", she was more upset about not being in the sketch. However, later in her confrontation with Matt she confessed to also being upset about the sketch. She received her undergraduate degree from Rutgers University. Harriet's character is based on West Wing alumna Kristin Chenoweth, whom Sorkin once dated.

Tom Jeter (Nate Corddry) is another of the show's "Big Three". While his comedic skills and gifts for character parody are acknowledged, he is self-critical and often looks on the Internet at critics' appraisals. According to the pilot script, "when he's not crafting a joke in his head, he's not sure what he's supposed to be doing". In "The Wrap Party", Tom's parents drive from Ohio to visit him, and demonstrate their lack of understanding of his work. In the same episode, Tom mentions that he sent body armor to his younger brother Mark's unit in Afghanistan. In the "Nevada Day" episodes, we find out that Tom's younger brother is in fact a part of a group of armed forces RED HORSE civil engineers that construct buildings incredibly fast, such as "a hospital in three days" (quote taken from the episodes).

Simon Stiles (D. L. Hughley) is the final member of the "Big Three". After attending the Yale School of Drama, and frustrated about parts lost to other prominent black performers (Jamie Foxx, Will Smith and Denzel Washington are named as examples), Simon was recruited to the cast of Studio 60. He feels limited by his skills as a comedic performer, unable to do "voices". However, it is seen by his subsequent place in the "Big Three", the enthusiastic response of the audience to his warm-ups to the show, and the respect shown to him by Danny in the initial episodes that Simon has rightfully earned his place in the Studio 60 cast. He may be based on black SNL player with a long tenure but a low comedic ceiling, Tim Meadows. Tom and Simon are united by their "mutual respect, their dedication to their show and nothing else." As he told Matt in "The Wrap Party", Simon grew up in South Central Los Angeles and risked death or imprisonment as a teenager.

Jack Rudolph (Steven Weber) is the chairman of the network NBS and Jordan's boss. Jack has a history of controversy with Matt and Danny, having caused the pair to quit Studio 60 four years earlier (in the wake of 9/11), when he ordered the two to apologize for a Karl Rove sketch he had expressly approved following pressure from conservative Christian groups, a move that he would later regret. While his frustrations at the re-hiring of Matt and Danny are evident, his main focus of administrative swagger is over Jordan, upon whom he places enormous pressure to succeed. In the pilot, he says, "I'm not like the other heterosexual males in the show business, Jordan. I don't find you charming." Jack has a quick and intense temper which he frequently brandishes, but is also a man of conviction, coming to Jordan's defense in a period of personal turmoil and vehemently defending the independence of the nightly news. Jack reports to Wilson White, Chairman of TMG, NBS's parent company.

Cal Shanley (Timothy Busfield) is the technical director of Studio 60. He has two children he is putting through private school. In the pilot, he allows Wes to rant unscripted for 53 seconds on live television, despite threats from network Standards and Practices executive Jerry; Danny so highly approved that he told Cal he would have earned a raise had he let Wes rant for 54 seconds. Cal is thoroughly upbeat with an equally fast-and-fluid sense of humor and extremely efficient at his job when circumstances change. (Busfield had a recurring guest role on The West Wing and also directed six episodes of Studio 60.

== Supporting roles ==
Ricky Tahoe (Evan Handler) and Ron Oswald (Carlos Jacott) are writers and, as part of their $30,000 per-episode contracts, current co-executive producers of Studio 60. They stepped into the creative void left by Danny and Matt when the pair quit, and in the pilot are portrayed as poor writers, "hacks" and command little professional respect from the stars of the show. Matt refers to them as "Beavis and Hackboy". It is revealed that Matt harbors a grudge against them because when he came out in support of Bill Maher after Maher made a controversial on-air remark, Ricky released a statement hanging Matt out to dry. They may have won an Emmy for writing in the past (Matt mentions this in the context of a disparagement of which other parts were made up). In "The Option Period", Ricky and Ron leave the show to pursue a spin-off pilot on Fox of "Peripheral Vision Man", a Studio 60 sketch.

Wes Mendell (Judd Hirsch) is the former executive producer and creator of Studio 60. His power is dwindling and he is furious with the network for bowing down to the FCC and religious groups. In the events of the pilot, he is the catalyst that brings Matt and Danny back to the show, fired on the night for the hijacking of the live broadcast of Studio 60 and ranting an improvised tirade, similar to that in the film Network (which is commented on in the pilot itself), venting against bureaucratic control, the influence of minority groups in the censorship of the network, and the nature of the broadcast industry. It is stated that he has worked with many of the great comedy writers and performers, such as Richard Pryor. He is referenced in various episodes, but appears only in the pilot.

Wilson White (Edward Asner) is the Chairman of Tunney Media Group, the parent company of the National Broadcasting System. This may be a (thinly) veiled reference to Jack Welch, the former head of General Electric, the parent company of NBC (Via NBC Universal), the network carrying the actual show. His interest in Studio 60 is usually minor, although at times uses it for business ventures, such as in "Nevada Day" when in order to secure a deal he arranges for Tom Jeter of Studio 60 to entertain Kim Tao, the daughter of a potential business client.

Jerry Jones (Michael Stuhlbarg) works for NBS as network censor. He is in charge of Standards and Practices and responsible for cutting a controversial sketch in "Pilot". The cut results in a furious on-air rant from Wes. Jerry later appears during flashbacks in "K&R Part II" asking Matt and Danny to cut a sketch about Karl Rove in the show following the beginning of the war in Afghanistan.

Jeannie Whatley (Ayda Field) is a cast member who sleeps with Matt from time to time. This revelation leads Harriet to blow up at Matt in front of the show's writing team. She is considered a gossip on set; in "The Option Period", she leaked the news that Harriet was considering posing for a lingerie spread in a men's magazine, and Matt quipped that he didn't think there was such thing as the Internet, there was only "Jeannie telling people stuff".

Alex Dwyer (Simon Helberg) is one of the cast members of Studio 60. He is not a member of the "Big Three", but is recognized as the complement to Harriet Hayes, being the lead male impressionist in the cast. He has at least one recurring sketch, The Nicolas Cage Show, in which he plays the title character, and has also portrayed Tom Cruise and Ben Stiller on the show.

Dylan Killington (Nate Torrence) is one of the cast members of Studio 60. He is a rookie on the show and doesn't appear to have garnered much respect yet from the likes of the Big Three. In "Nevada Day 2", Matt picks Dylan to perform in the "News 60" sketch in case Simon does not return from Nevada in time for the show; Dylan is very insecure and self-conscious about his appearance in such a high-profile role until Matt goads Jeannie into flattering and flirting with Dylan to boost his confidence.

Samantha Li (Camille Chen) is one of the cast members of Studio 60. Her most notable sketch is "Samantha Li's Thai Therapy".

Lucy Kenwright (Lucy Davis) is an English junior writer on the show and the only pre-Matt and Danny writer to remain after Ricky and Ron's departure. She then begins a romantic relationship with Tom Jeter.

Darren Wells (Teddy Sears) is a professional baseball player, a pitcher for the Los Angeles Dodgers. He started dating Harriet after she sang the National Anthem at a Los Angeles Dodgers game. In "The Wrap Party", Harriet found out that Darren also wrote his phone number on a baseball given to Jordan, which apparently ended the relationship.

Martha O'Dell (Christine Lahti) is a journalist writing a "long lead story" about Matt and Danny's return to Studio 60 for Vanity Fair.

Wendy (Cyia Batten) is a member of the "Bombshell Babies" (a dance group similar to The Pussycat Dolls) and Matt's former girlfriend. In "The West Coast Delay" she talks Matt out of a plan to have her sign a stiletto boot in an attempt to get back at Harriet, who had given Matt a baseball bat with Darren Wells's phone number written on it. She reappears a few episodes later at the end of a dinner honoring Harriet and helps Matt back to the theater, where she reveals that she is newly engaged.

Darius Hawthorne (Columbus Short) is a junior writer who is hired by Matt Albie and Simon Stiles after seeing his stand-up act in "The Wrap Party".

Luke Scott (Josh Stamberg) used to be a writer on the show and is Matt's main rival for Harriet. He is currently directing a movie about The Rolling Stones and he cast Harriet to play Anita Pallenberg.

Andy Mackinaw (Mark McKinney) was introduced in "B-12" after Ricky and Ron's departure (from the prior episode: "The Option Period") when Matt needed the help of an extra writer. Andy was previously a writer on Studio 60 years before, while Matt and Danny were still there. After Matt and Danny's initial departure from the show, Andy's wife and daughter died in tragic circumstances. It is revealed in a flashback scene in "K & R, Part I" that Matt never saw Andy smile until he walked into the writer's room in 2001 and announced his daughter's birth.

Suzanne (Merritt Wever) used to be a PA on the show before becoming Matt's assistant. She is the first to confront Matt about his drug use in the episode "Breaking News", revealing that her mother took 20-30 Percocets a day before killing herself when Suzanne was 10.

Hallie Galloway (Stephanie Childers) is the Vice President of Alternative Programming for NBS and has developed an adversarial relationship with Jordan. She first appears in the episode "Monday". Jordan has expressed her fear that Galloway is being groomed to take her place after the rocky start to McDeere's tenure as president of the network.

Mary Tate (Kari Matchett) is a lawyer from Gage Whitney Pace who is investigating a sexual harassment suit by Karen Salzburg, a writer who was fired from the show. She has an obvious sexual and romantic interest in Matt.

Herb Sheldon (John F. Carpenter) is the announcer for the show.

Zhang Tao (Raymond Ma) is a Chinese businessman who is behind a multimillion-dollar merger with NBS to turn the city of Macau into "the Las Vegas of East Asia." Zhang becomes a key player when the board of NBS attempts to remove Wilson White as chairman and CEO.

Kim Tao (Julia Ling) is the daughter of Zhang Tao and a viola prodigy. She is infatuated with Tom Jeter.

== See also ==
- List of Studio 60 on the Sunset Strip episodes
