= One False Move (novel) =

1998 novel by Harlan Coben

- 1998 Delacorte Press edition
- Author: Harlan Coben
- Language: English
- Series: A Myron Bolitar Novel
- Genre: Mystery, thriller
- Publisher: Dell
- Publication date: 1998
- Publication place: United States
- Media type: Print (hardback & paperback)
- Pages: 400

One False Move is a novel by author Harlan Coben. It is the fifth novel in his series of a crime solver and sports agent named Myron Bolitar.
