= Home (Coben novel) =

Novel by Harlan Coben

- First edition (US)
- Author: Harlan Coben
- Language: English
- Series: A Myron Bolitar novel
- Genre: Mystery, thriller
- Publisher: Orion Books United Kingdom, Dutton Adult United States
- Publication date: Hardback: September 2016 (Dutton Adult), October 2016 (Orion); Paperback: May 2017 (Penguin Books)
- Publication place: United States
- Media type: Print (hardback, paperback)
- Pages: 385 pp (hardback)
- Preceded by: Live Wire

Home is a 2016 mystery/thriller novel by American writer, Harlan Coben. It is the eleventh novel in his series featuring crime solver and sports agent Myron Bolitar.

The story in Home takes place approximately one year after the events of Live Wire (2011), during which time the Win character has been in hiding. Some of the character histories referenced are actually revealed in the spinoff Mickey Bolitar books, a series of three young adult novels featuring Myron Bolitar's nephew. The stories in those three novels precede the events of Home.

The Real Book Spy notes that: "Dedicated fans are treated to a number of juicy tidbits and inside jokes. And, for the first time ever, several chapters are told in the first-person narrative through Win's perspective, allowing readers an inside look at the thinking and personality of Myron's sidekick like never before." Jackie K. Cooper at Huffington Post writes: "The word 'home' refers to many things in this book … Coben takes all of these definitions and blends them together to make this an exciting but reflective story. There is an element of brutality in some parts, but elsewhere there are warm and fuzzy moments. Neither is used in the extreme."

== Plot summary ==
After a year in hiding, Win contacts Myron to say he has located Patrick Moore, now 16, one of two boys kidnapped ten years ago from the home of Brooke Baldwin, Win's cousin. The other six-year old kidnapped was Brooke's son, Rhys. After initial ransom demands, the kidnappers mysteriously went silent. Patrick is apparently working in the sex trade under duress in London. Working with Win, Myron is able to rescue Patrick from his captor, but is unable to secure another teenager thought to be Rhys Baldwin.

As the hunt for Rhys continues, Myron and Win, with help from Mickey Bolitar and his school friends, try to unravel the complicated Moore and Baldwin family dynamics, as well as determine if Patrick is really who he claims to be. When the mystery of what happened that fateful day ten years ago is finally revealed, Myron must race the clock to keep another tragedy from occurring.

== Main characters ==
- Myron Bolitar: former partner at MB Reps talent agency and part-time crime solver
- Windsor Horne "Win" Lockwood III: wealthy owner of Locke-Horne Securities & Investments; Myron's best friend and sidekick
- Patrick Moore: one of two young boys abducted from wealthy families ten years ago, the other being Win's nephew Rhys Baldwin
- Fat Gandhi (real name: Christopher Allan Weeks): a human trafficker living in London who initially holds Patrick and (possibly) Rhys hostage
- Nancy Moore: Patrick's mother
- Hunter Moore: Nancy's ex-husband and Patrick's father
- Brooke Baldwin: Rhys's mother and Win's cousin
- Chick Baldwin: Brooke's husband and Rhys's father
- Mickey Bolitar: a high school student, son of Brad and Kitty Bolitar, and nephew of Myron Bolitar
- Ema Wyatt: Mickey's goth girlfriend. Daughter of actress Angelica Wyatt and an unknown father. Her birth father is revealed as the story closes.
- Spoon: a tech nerd and Mickey's friend who uses his cyber skills to assist the group in searching for the truth about Patrick and Rhys
- Teresa Collins: former CNN anchor and Myron's fiancée, who marries him as the story closes
