= Neil McMahon =

American novelist (born 1949)

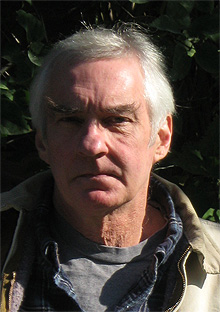
- Born: 1949 (age 76–77)
- Occupation: Novelist
- Writing career
- Genre: Thriller
- Notable works: Twice Dying; Lone Creek; L.A. Mental; Toys with James Patterson

Neil McMahon (born 1949) is the author of ten novels, as well as a collaboration with James Patterson—Toys—which was a New York Times #1 Bestseller. He has written two series: the Carroll Monks books (Twice Dying, Blood Double, To The Bone, Revolution No. 9), and the Hugh Davoren books (Lone Creek, Dead Silver). In the late 1980s he wrote three horror novels (all originally published under the pseudonym "Daniel Rhodes") that have been reissued as ebooks.

McMahon was a Stegner Fellow at Stanford. His novels have been praised by fellow writers Michael Connelly, James Crumley, Annick Smith, William Kittredge, C.J. Box, Deirdre McNamer, Andrew Schneider and many others. He lives in Missoula, Montana.

A complete list of McMahon's published novels:

- Next, After Lucifer — 1987 — originally published under the pseudonym "Daniel Rhodes" — reissued as ebook in 2011
- Adversary — 1988 — originally published under the pseudonym "Daniel Rhodes" — reissued as ebook in 2011
- Kiss of Death — 1990 — originally published under the pseudonym "Daniel Rhodes" — reissued as ebook in 2011 with new title, Cast Angels Down to Hell
- Twice Dying — 2000 — first of four novels featuring the protagonist Carroll Monks
- Blood Double — 2002
- To The Bone — 2003
- Revolution No. 9 — 2005
- Lone Creek — 2007 — first of two novels featuring the protagonist Hugh Davoren
- Dead Silver — 2008
- L.A. Mental — 2011
- Toys — 2011 — collaboration with James Patterson
