= Long Lost =

2009 novel by Harlan Coben

- First edition cover (US) showing Notre Dame
- Author: Harlan Coben
- Language: English
- Series: A Myron Bolitar Novel
- Genre: Mystery, thriller
- Publisher: Orion Books United Kingdom, Dutton Adult United States
- Publication date: Hardback: March 2009 (Dutton Adult), April 2009 (Orion); Paperback: March 2009 (Dutton Adult), October 2009 (Orion)
- Publication place: United States
- Media type: Print (hardback, paperback)
- Pages: 400 pp (hardback)
- ISBN: 978-0-525-95105-6 (DA; hardback), ISBN 978-0-7528-8522-3 (OB; hardback), ISBN 978-1-4091-0100-0 (DA; paperback), ISBN 978-1-4091-0219-9 (OB; paperback)
- Preceded by: Promise Me
- Followed by: Live Wire

Long Lost is a novel by American writer Harlan Coben, first published in 2009. It is the ninth novel in his series of a crime solver and sports agent named Myron Bolitar.

== Plot ==
Myron Bolitar receives a phone call from an ex-lover, Terese, who asks him to come to Paris immediately. Upon arriving, Myron is informed by French police that Terese's ex-husband, Rick, has been murdered and Terese is the prime suspect. She is soon cleared of the charges.

At the scene of the murder, blood was found that matched that of Rick's daughter. Terese informs Myron that ten years previously, her only daughter with Rick, Miriam, was killed in a car accident that led to Terese and Rick's divorce. After nearly being kidnapped, Myron catches a glimpse of a teenage blonde girl who resembles Terese and wonders if perhaps Miriam's death was faked.

Myron sees the same girl again and follows her into a house in London. There, he is ambushed by terrorists who kill Rick's second wife. After murdering the lead terrorist, Myron is taken to a “black site,” a secret interrogation facility maintained by the United States government to torture suspected terrorists. When his innocence is realized, he is released but does not recall anything that happened while incarcerated.

Meanwhile, back in the United States, DNA samples taken from Miriam's grave prove that she is in fact dead. Myron suspects that Terese's frozen embryos were used illegally to create a second daughter, the elusive blonde girl he has been seeking. Myron and his accomplice Win investigate the charity “Save the Angels,” which promotes adoption over stem-cell research and is run by right-wing conservative Christians. Rick had been investigating the charity shortly before being murdered.

Myron and the French detective Berleand track the teenage blonde girl to a home that was pictured on the “Save the Angels” website. There, they are ambushed by a terrorist cell and Berleand is killed. Upon entering the home, Myron discovers a group of blonde, blue-eyed children who have been raised from stolen embryos by terrorists in the hopes of training them for suicide missions. The terrorist cell is wiped out by law enforcement and the brainwashed children are taken into custody. Myron tracks down Terese to Angola, where she has been hiding with her long lost daughter since the ambush in London.

It is implied at the end of the book that law enforcement failed to track down all of the terrorists: a blonde, blue-eyed teenage boy with a heavy backpack is seen stepping from a bus and walking into a crowded area of tourists.

== Main characters ==
- Myron Bolitar: a sports agent who assists his ex-lover Terese in tracking down her long lost daughter.
- Terese Collins: once a CNN anchor, divorced from Rick Collins, was Myron's lover on an island in The Final Detail.
- Windsor "Win" Horne Lockwood, III: Myron's friend from Duke and sidekick. Earned great wealth through an inheritance of Lock-Horne Securities & Investments.
- Esperanza Diaz: former FLOW (Fabulous Ladies Of Wrestling) professional wrestler under the name Little Pocahontas; now she is vice-president of MB Reps and Myron's closest friend.
- Captain Berleand: French detective who assists Myron with the case.
