= Deirdre McNamer =

American novelist

Deirdre McNamer is an American novelist and essayist.

She was on the fiction faculty of the Bennington Writing Seminars Master of Fine Arts program from 2015 to 2024, and taught at the University of Montana's MFA program from 1995 to 2020. She chaired the fiction panel of the 2011 National Book Awards and served on the panel of the 2015 PEN/Faulkner Award.

McNamer is a 2015 recipient of an Artists Innovation Award from the Montana Arts Council, and a 2022 recipient of the Montana Governor's Award for the Arts.

== Published works ==
McNamer's novels include:

- Rima in the Weeds (1991)
- One Sweet Quarrel (1994)
- My Russian (1999)
- Red Rover (2007)
- Aviary (2021)

Critic Sven Birkerts: Red Rover is suggestively compressed in its way of paying out revelations, which steadily gather mass and shadows. Indeed, the means of presentation, the structural logic of the novel, are as much a part of its meaning as its thematic suggestions. McNamer's way of combining her far-flung episodes effectively triangulates the unknowable event at the heart of the novel; we work out much of the drama through a kind of echolocation."

The Washington Post, Los Angeles Times and Artforum all named Red Rover to their "Best Book" of 2007 lists.

McNamer's stories and essays have appeared in The New Yorker, Ploughshares, Outside, and in the opinion and book review sections of the New York Times.
