= RBA Prize for Crime Writing =

Former Spanish literary award

RBA Prize for Crime Writing (Spanish: Premio RBA de Novela Policiaca) was a Spanish literary award said to be the world's most lucrative crime fiction prize at €125,000. It is funded by Barcelona-based multimedia publishing company RBA.

== Winners ==
Year	Author	Title	Ref
2007	Francisco González Ledesma	Una novela de barrio (A Neighborhood Novel)	
2008	Andrea Camilleri	La rizzagliata (The Death of Amalia Sacerdote)	
2009	Philip Kerr	If the Dead Rise Not	
2010	Harlan Coben	Live Wire	
2011	Patricia Cornwell	Red Mist	
2012	Michael Connelly	The Black Box	
2013	Arnaldur Indriðason	Skuggasund (The Shadow District)	
2014	Lee Child	Personal	
2015	Don Winslow	The Cartel	
2016	Ian Rankin	Even Dogs in the Wild	
2017	John Banville (under his pseudonym Benjamin Black)	Snow	
2018	Walter Mosley	Down the River unto the Sea	
