= Julia Ling =

American actress

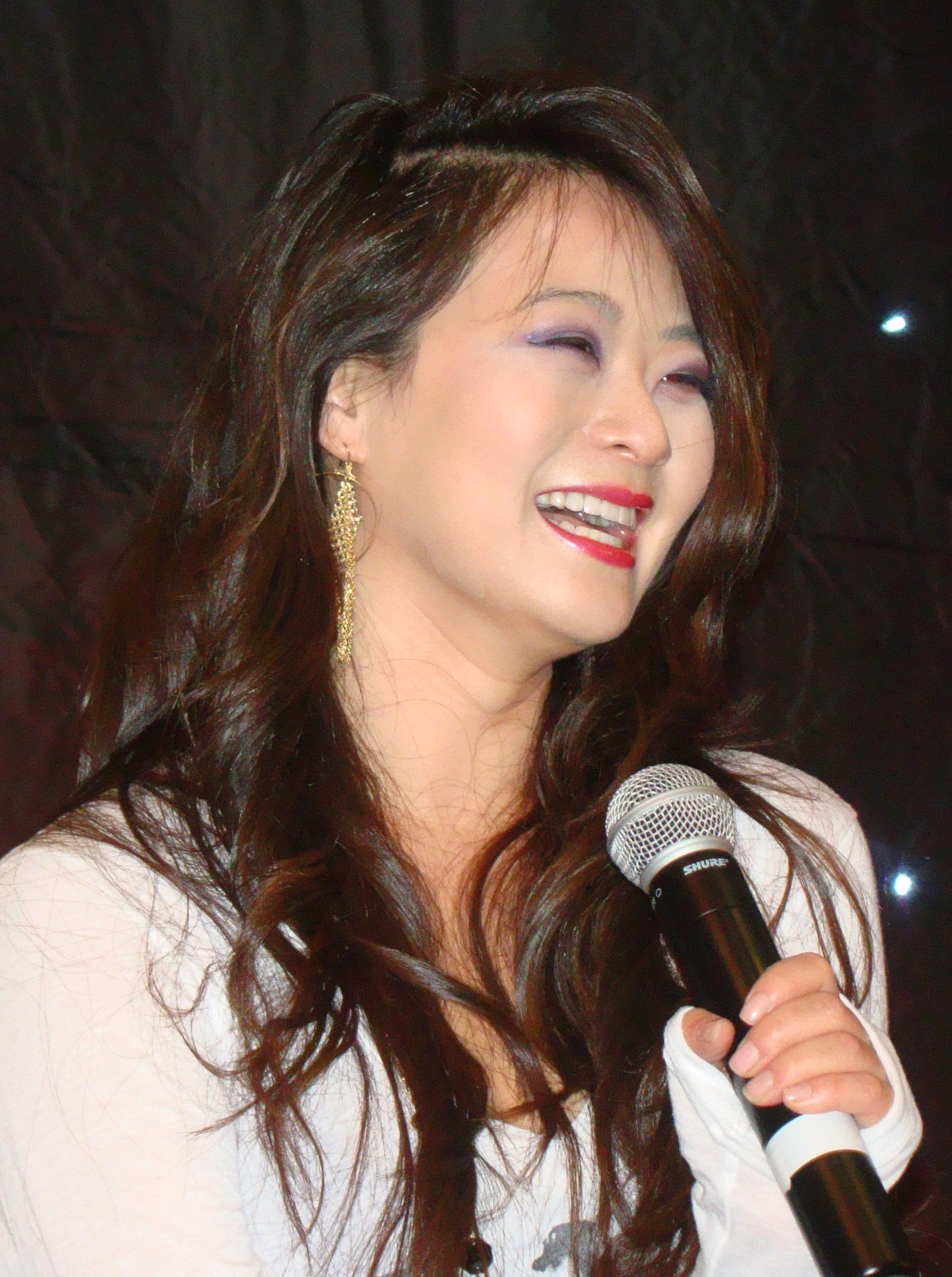
- Julia Ling in 2011
- Born: Xiao Wei Lin; Temple City, California, U.S.
- Other name: Xiao Wein Lin
- Occupation: Actress
- Years active: 2003-present
- Website: julialing.com

Julia Ling
- Traditional Chinese: 林小微
- Simplified Chinese: 林小微
Transcriptions
Standard Mandarin
- Hanyu Pinyin: Lín Xiǎowēi

Julia Ling, born Xiao Wei Lin, is an American actress. Her television work includes recurring roles on television series ER, Studio 60 on the Sunset Strip, and as a series regular on Chuck.

== Early life and education ==
Ling was born in Temple City, California. Her grandparents originally from China, fled to Cambodia during the Second Sino-Japanese War. Ling's parents grew up in Cambodia.

At age 6, Ling won the "Best Storyteller Award" by Chinese World News for storytelling. Ling's artwork was featured on the front page of Pasadena Star News and in magazines and festivals. By age 9, Ling was performing award-winning solo dances throughout California, and her umbrella dance had aired on national television.

At Temple City High School, as a scholar athlete, she competed in dance, tennis, and swimming.

At UCLA, Ling majored in biomedical chemical engineering. She was Treasurer of the Chemical Engineering Society, Vice President of the Engineering Society of UCLA, and honorary member of the Society of Women Engineers.

== Career ==
Ling has starred in over 20 independent films and had numerous TV roles. She made her TV debut in 2003 on Buffy the Vampire Slayer, and later starred in the recurring role of Kim Tao on NBC's Studio 60 on the Sunset Strip. She played Anna Wu on NBC's Chuck for 3 seasons. Her other major guest and recurring roles on television include stints on House, ER, Grey's Anatomy, The O.C., and The Deep End.

In 2007, Ling competed in the martial arts competition Jackie Chan Disciples. She was selected as a "Top Four Finalist" representing the U.S. at the International Finalists tournament in China. Her performance also won her the "Best Acting Award". She was unable to compete in China because of her role on Chuck.

In 2008, Ling voiced and filmed her first live action series for the video game Command and Conquer: Red Alert 3.

In 2020, Ling appeared as a guest on the Studio 60 on the Sunset Strip marathon fundraiser episode of The George Lucas Talk Show.

== Filmography ==
All credits are from IMDb.

=== Film ===
Year	Title	Role	Notes
2004	Educating Lewis	Julia	Television film
2005	We All Fall Down	Schoolgirl	Short film
2005	Guess Who	Speedracer	Uncredited
2005	Memoirs of a Geisha	Spring Festival Dancer	Uncredited
2006	Undoing	Linda	
2009	Angus Petfarkin Paints His Masterpiece	Epsilon	
2010	High School	Charlyne	
2010	Cinder	Mei	Short film
2010	Love Sick Diaries	Origami Girl	
2011	Halloween Knight	Val	Short film
2013	Dynamite Swine	Lulu	

=== Television ===
Year	Title	Role	Notes
2003	Buffy the Vampire Slayer	Power Potential #2	Episode "Chosen"
2006–2007	ER	Michelle, Mae Lee Park	6 episodes
2006	House	Anne Ling	Episode: "Sleeping Dogs Lie"
2006–2007	Studio 60 on the Sunset Strip	Kim Tao	5 episodes
2007	The O.C.	Lucy	Episode: "The Dream Lover"
2007–2010	Chuck	Anna Wu	22 episodes
2007	Grey's Anatomy	Emma Rachel Lane	Episode: "Forever Young"
2010	The Deep End	Mei Brundage	Episode: "To Have and to Hold"
2011	I Hate My Teenage Daughter	Jane	Episode: "Pilot"
2020	The George Lucas Talk Show	Herself	Stu-D2 1138 on the Binary Sunset Sith (Studio 60 on the Sunset Strip marathon)

=== Video games ===
Year	Title	Role	Notes
2009	Command & Conquer: Red Alert 3 – Uprising	Izumi	
