= Live Wire (novel) =

2011 mystery/thriller novel by Harlan Coben

- First US edition (publ. Dutton)
- Author: Harlan Coben
- Language: English
- Publisher: E. P. Dutton
- Publication date: 2011
- ISBN: 978-0-525-95206-0 (first edition)
- Dewey Decimal: 813.54
- LC Class: PS3553.O225 L58

Live Wire is a 2011 mystery/thriller novel by American author Harlan Coben. It is the tenth novel in his series featuring a crime solver and sports agent Myron Bolitar. The novel was preceded by Long Lost (2009) and followed by Home (2016).

In 2010, Live Wire won the world's most lucrative crime fiction award, the RBA Prize for Crime Writing worth €125,000.

== Plot summary ==
When Myron's client, former tennis star Suzze T, and her rock star husband, Lex Ryder, encounter an anonymous Facebook post questioning the paternity of their unborn child, Lex runs off. Suzze – at eight months pregnant – asks Myron to save her marriage, and perhaps her husband's life. But when he finds Lex, he also finds someone he wasn't looking for: his sister-in-law, Kitty, who along with Myron's brother, Brad, abandoned the Bolitar family long ago.

Following Suzze's apparent suicide, Myron and Win find a connection between Lex, the notorious Ache brothers, and the reclusive Gabriel Wire, the more famous half (with Lex) of the top-selling rock duo HorsePower. As Myron races to locate his missing brother while their father clings to life, he must face the lies that led to the estrangement – including the ones told by Myron himself.

== Main characters ==
- Myron Bolitar: a sports agent and part-time crime solver.
- Windsor "Win" Horne Lockwood, III: Myron's friend from Duke and sidekick. Earned great wealth through an inheritance of the Lock-Horne Securities & Investments firm.
- Esperanza Diaz: former FLOW (Fabulous Ladies Of Wrestling) professional wrestler under the name Little Pocahontas; she is a partner at MB Reps (as of the novel Darkest Fear) and is Myron's closest friend after Win.
- Suzze T: former professional tennis player who is still Myron's client.
- Lex Ryder: Suzze's husband, half of the legendary rock duo HorsePower.
- Kitty Hammer Bolitar: Myron's sister-in-law who was a tennis rival of Suzze T's when both were in their teens.
