= What the Night Knows =

2010 novel by Dean Koontz

- Author: Dean Koontz
- Language: English
- Genre: Thriller, Horror
- Publisher: Bantam Publishing
- Publication date: 2010
- Publication place: United States
- Media type: Hardcover; Paperback
- Pages: 464
- ISBN: 0-553-80772-2

What the Night Knows is a 2010 novel by bestselling author Dean Koontz. It reached No. 1 on the New York Times Bestseller List. Following the events of the novella "Darkness Under the Sun," it follows the life of John Calvino, a survivor of a violent attack on his family and current police officer. In the aftermath of Billy Lucas's brutal slaying of his own family, Calvino notices many similarities between Billy Lucas's family and his own, and Lucas knows more about Calvino than he possibly can. Spooked, remembering the attack of that left his family dead so many years ago at the hands of the late Alton Turner Blackwood, Calvino starts worrying that Blackwood, or his memory, might be back, and the family Calvino created may be in danger.

Though some may call it part of the horror genre, Koontz refers to the novel as a "ghost story".

== Plot summary ==
The novel begins with John Calvino investigating the murder of a family, committed by Billy Lucas. Billy is in a mental institution and being monitored for being schizophrenic. He openly admits to having killed his family and can describe to John in graphic detail how he murdered them. John goes to visit Billy; Billy indicates that the reason he killed them was because of “Ruin”. As John is leaving, Billy's countenance changes and he begins saying “help me”.

John begins to investigate the murders, and finds that there are a number of similarities between the murders committed by Billy, and murders committed by Alton Turner Blackwood some 20 years previously. Alton Blackwood killed John's entire family. The two families were murdered in almost exactly the same way.

John's family (his wife Nicolette, and his children Zach, Naomi, and Minette), begin to be haunted by dreams, sounds in the house, and ghostly phone calls. John receives a call from Billy taunting him and saying things that only John or Alton Blackwood would know concerning John's sister. John follows up on Billy to find out he does not have a phone in his cell and could not possibly have made the phone call.

John begins to work on the theory that it was not Billy Lucas that killed his family, but rather Alton Blackwood.

Billy is found dead in his cell having died from the stress of what he was going through.

John's wife Nicolette, who had oral surgery three months before, begins to be haunted. Thinking that the medicine she received for her teeth were causing hallucinations, she sees her doctor again, only to have him confirm that the Vicodin she took at the time has not had any adverse effect.

The reader begins to learn about other instances of people being possessed by the spirit of Alton Blackwood, known as the “rider”. A man named Reese Salsetto, possessed by Alton, attempts to kill his sister Brenda's family and rape his niece. Brenda shoots Reese dead; Alton then tries to possess her. In the fight, in order to escape Alton, she turns the gun on herself. It is later learned that she was trying to fend off the spirit trying to possess her. The spirit of Blackwood enters many others and causes them to do deplorable crimes.

John believes that the spirit of Alton Blackwood is possessing people. He tells another detective, his friend Lionel, who is tentative but believes him. He goes and talks with a friend, Priest Abelard, who tells him about possession but who is not willing to help due to his own personal demons.

John's daughter Naomi begins meeting with Melody Lane, a possessed woman who claims to be a fairy queen from a fantasy land. They develop a friendship.

Alton Blackwood has killed on a 33-day cycle. John believes that on the next cycle he will try to kill John's family; however, the spirit advances the timetable and attacks early. Numerous people are possessed including the drug-addicted son of Calvino's housekeepers, child-killer Melody Lane, reporter Roger Hodd, and the children's math tutor, Professor Sinyavski. All four attack John's family in their house. John's family fights against the possessed people.

The book ends with John offering his own body to the spirit, and with his youngest daughter's mysterious aid is able to defeat Blackwood's spirit and shed the less literal demons that have been haunting him since the murder of his first family.

== Darkness Under the Sun ==
This novella was written for the Kindle, and saw print in the paperback edition of the novel. It is mainly set prior to the incidents in What The Night Knows, but also bookends the novel itself. In the initial part of the novella, Alton Turner Blackwood meets a boy named Howie, and the subsequent events of this novella dovetail into the background of the main novel, with a time lapse to the end of the novel.
