= List of Dutch child actors =

This is a list of child actors from the Netherlands. Films and/or television series they appeared in are mentioned only if they were still a child at the time of filming.

Current child actors (under the age of eighteen) are indicated by boldface.

== B ==
- Jim Bakkum (born 1987)
  - Baantjer (1 episode, 2003)
  - Snowfever (2004)

== C ==
- Horace Cohen (born 1971)
  - Flodder (1986)

== G ==
- Tess Gaerthé (born 1991)
  - Sea of Silence (2003)

== K ==
- Melody Klaver (born 1990)
  - Mijn zusje Zlata (short film, 2003)
  - Het glazen huis (1 episode, 2004)
  - Diep (2005)
  - Langer licht (2006)
  - Afblijven (2006)
  - Doors (short film, 2007)
  - De Daltons, de jongensjaren (1 episode, 2007)
  - Oorlogswinter (2008)
  - Roes (1 episode, 2008)
- Stijn Koomen (born 1987)
  - Wat nou?! (2000)
  - Focus op de maatschappij (2003)
  - Simon (2004)
  - Deep (2005)

== L ==
- Nani Lehnhausen (born 1975)
  - Flodder (1986)

== M ==
- Danny de Munk (born 1970)
  - Ciske de Rat (1984)
  - Danny Dubbel (1985)
  - Op Hoop van Zegen (1986)
  - De Vuurdoop (1988)

== N ==
- Noah de Nooij (born 2001)
  - The Dinner (2013)
  - Alles mag (short film, 2014)
  - Bouwdorp (2014)
  - Dummie the Mummy and the Golden Scarabee (2014)
  - Kasper en de kerstengelen (2015)
  - Dummie the Mummy and the Sphinx of Shakaba (2015)
  - Lost in the Game (2016)
  - Dummie the Mummy and the Tomb of Achnetut (2017)
  - De vloer op jr. (2018)

== P ==
- Serge Price (born 1991)
  - Eerste kind op de maan (2001)
  - Peter Bell (2002)
  - Peter Bell II: The Hunt for the Czar Crown (2003)
  - Dokter Vogel (2004)
  - Gruesome School Trip (2005)
  - The Storm (2009)

== S ==
- Matthijs van de Sande Bakhuyzen (born 1988)
  - De Daltons (10 episodes, 1999–2000)
  - Saint Amour (2001)
  - Ernstige Delicten (1 episode, 2002)
  - Cloaca (2003)
  - Dajo (2004)
  - Absolutely Positive (2006)
  - Penvriendin (2006)
  - Keep Off (2006)
- Jorik Scholten (born 1994)
  - Deep (2005)
  - Van Speijk (1 episode, 2007)
- Quinten Schram (born 1992)
  - Stuart Little (Dutch voice of George Little, 1999)
  - Little Crumb (1999)
  - Peter Bell (2002)
  - Peter Bell II: The Hunt for the Czar Crown (2003)
  - Cheeze dippers (Commercial, 2003)
  - Postman Pat (voice in the Dutch dub, since 2003)
  - Jesus & Josefine (Dutch voice of Jesus, 2004)
  - Parels & Zwijnen (2005)
  - Racing Stripes (Dutch voice of Young Ruffshodd)
  - Nanny McPhee (Dutch voice of Simon)
  - Keep Off (2006)
  - Timboektoe (2007)
  - The Letter for the King (2008)
  - Lover of loser (2009)
  - Toy Story 3 (Dutch voice of Andy Davis, 2010)
- Tessa Schram (nl) (born 1988)
  - Een echte hond (1998)
  - Little Crumb (1999)
  - Peter Bell II: The Hunt for the Czar Crown (2003)
  - Keep Off (2006)
  - Grijpstra & De Gier: Lekkere jongens (2006)
- Lisa Smit (born 1993)
  - Gruesome School Trip (2005)
  - Liefs uit de Linnaeusstraat (2005)
  - Gezocht: Man (2005)
  - Burgers/Reizigers (2005)
  - Absolutely Positive (2006)
  - Boks (1 episode, 2006)
  - Tyger (2006)
  - Los (short film, 2007)
  - Onzichtbaar (short film, 2007)
  - Willemspark (2007)
  - Ebony (short film, 2007)
  - TBS (2008)
  - Two Eyes Staring (2010)
  - Shocking Blue (2010)
  - We gaan nog niet naar huis (1 episode, 2010)
  - Flikken Maastricht (3 episodes, 2010–2011)
  - Mijn Marko (2011)
  - Lena (2011)
  - Bluf (2011)
  - Skins in de polder (short film, 2011)
  - No Credit No Life (short film, 2011)
  - Yana (short film, 2011)
  - De Ark (short film, 2011)
- Huub Stapel (born 1954)
  - Vertige pour un tueur (1970)

== V ==
- Sem Veeger (born 1991)
  - Keep Off (2006)
  - Spoorloos verdwenen (1 episode, 2007)
  - Shouf Shouf! (1 episode, 2009)

== W ==
- Ilse Werner (1921–2005)
  - Die unruhigen Mädchen (1938)
  - Frau Sixta (1938)
  - Das Leben kann so schön sein (1938)
  - Bel Ami (1939)
  - Fräulein (1939)
  - Drei Väter um Anna (1939)
  - Her First Experience (1939)
- Jolijn van de Wiel (born 1992)
  - Hoe overleef ik mezelf? (2008)
  - Kinderen geen bezwaar (2009)
