= Dave Jordan (music supervisor) =

American music supervisor

Dave Jordan is an American music supervisor and film producer, best known for serving as head of music at Marvel Studios. Jordan has overseen the music for most films in the Marvel Cinematic Universe, including Guardians of the Galaxy, Black Panther, and Avengers: Endgame.

== Early life and career ==
Jordan was born in Anaheim, California, and moved to Los Angeles in 1990 to pursue a career in music. He began his career in the music industry working for Atlantic Records before transitioning into music supervision for film and television in the late 1990s.

Early in his career as a music supervisor, Jordan worked on films including Dude, Where's My Car? (2000), American Pie 2 (2001), The Fast and the Furious (2001), and Transformers (2007).

Jordan's early credits also include Daredevil (2003), whose soundtrack featured Evanescence's "Bring Me to Life". Released as the lead single from Daredevil: The Album on January 13, 2003, the song reached number five on the Billboard Hot 100 and became a top-ten hit in numerous countries.

== Marvel Cinematic Universe ==
Jordan has served as music supervisor on Marvel Studios productions from the beginning of the Marvel Cinematic Universe in 2008, and is credited as the studio's head of music. His Marvel credits include Iron Man, The Incredible Hulk, Captain America: Civil War, Thor: Ragnarok and several Avengers films.

Throughout the decade, he contributed to numerous studio and franchise projects, including multiple superhero and action films within the Marvel Studios universe, further establishing his influence on the sound of modern blockbuster cinema.

=== Selected Marvel Studios projects ===
Jordan served as music supervisor for Iron Man 2 (2010). The film featured a collaboration with the Australian rock band AC/DC, whose compilation album AC/DC: Iron Man 2 was released alongside the film and included songs featured in its soundtrack.

For Guardians of the Galaxy (2014), Jordan supervised the soundtrack album Guardians of the Galaxy: Awesome Mix Vol. 1, a compilation of commercially released songs from the 1960s and 1970s featured throughout the film. The album reached number one on the Billboard 200, becoming the first soundtrack consisting entirely of previously released songs to top the chart.

Jordan was also music supervisor for Black Panther (2018) and Avengers: Endgame (2019).

== Television and streaming ==
Jordan has served as music supervisor for numerous television productions, including the Fox drama series Empire.

As head of music at Marvel Studios, Jordan supervised music for several Disney+ series set in the Marvel Cinematic Universe, including WandaVision (2021), Loki (2021), Hawkeye (2021), and Moon Knight (2022).

== Film production ==
Jordan has collaborated with filmmaker Mark Steven Johnson on several productions, serving as both music supervisor and film producer. These include Love, Guaranteed (2020), Love in the Villa (2022), and Champagne Problems (2025).

== Selected filmography ==
Year	Title	Role
2000	Dude, Where's My Car?	Music supervisor
2001	The Fast and the Furious	Music consultant
2001	American Pie 2	Music supervisor
2002	Big Fat Liar	Music supervisor
2002	Blade II	Music consultant
2003	Daredevil	Music supervisor
2003	Cheaper by the Dozen	Music supervisor
2011	Thor	Music supervisor
2011	Captain America: The First Avenger	Music supervisor
2012	The Avengers	Music supervisor
2012	Battleship	Music consultant
2013	Iron Man 3	Music supervisor
2013	The Internship	Music supervisor
2014	Captain America: The Winter Soldier	Music supervisor
2014	Godzilla	Music supervisor
2014	Guardians of the Galaxy	Music supervisor
2015	Avengers: Age of Ultron	Music supervisor
2015	Ant-Man	Music supervisor
2015	Daddy's Home	Music supervisor
2016	Captain America: Civil War	Music supervisor
2016	Doctor Strange	Music supervisor
2017	Spider-Man: Homecoming	Music supervisor
2017	Thor: Ragnarok	Music supervisor
2017	Guardians of the Galaxy Vol. 2	Music supervisor
2018	Black Panther	Music supervisor
2018	Avengers: Infinity War	Music supervisor
2018	Ant-Man and the Wasp	Music supervisor
2019	Captain Marvel	Music supervisor
2019	Avengers: Endgame	Music supervisor
2019	Spider-Man: Far From Home	Music supervisor
2020	Love, Guaranteed	Producer
2021	Black Widow	Music supervisor
2021	Shang-Chi and the Legend of the Ten Rings	Music supervisor
2021	Eternals	Music supervisor
2021	PAW Patrol: The Movie	Music supervisor
2021	Spider-Man: No Way Home	Music supervisor
2022	Doctor Strange in the Multiverse of Madness	Music supervisor
2022	Thor: Love and Thunder	Music supervisor
2022	Black Panther: Wakanda Forever	Music supervisor
2022	Love in the Villa	Co-producer
2023	Ant-Man and the Wasp: Quantumania	Music supervisor
2023	Guardians of the Galaxy Vol. 3	Music supervisor
2023	The Marvels	Music supervisor
2024	Deadpool & Wolverine	Music supervisor
2025	Captain America: Brave New World	Music supervisor
2025	Thunderbolts*	Music supervisor
2025	The Fantastic Four: First Steps	Music supervisor
2025	Champagne Problems	Co-producer

== Awards and nominations ==
Year	Award	Category	Work	Result	Ref.
2008	Hollywood Music in Media Awards	Outstanding Music Supervision – Film	Iron Man	Won	
2008	Hollywood Music in Media Awards	Outstanding Music Supervision – Film	The Incredible Hulk	Won	
2010	Guild of Music Supervisors Awards	Best Music Supervision for Film	Iron Man 2	Nominated	
2011	Guild of Music Supervisors Awards	Best Music Supervision for Film	Thor	Nominated	
2011	Guild of Music Supervisors Awards	Best Music Supervision for Film	Captain America: The First Avenger	Nominated	
2014	Guild of Music Supervisors Awards	Best Music Supervision for Film	Guardians of the Galaxy	Won	
2014	Hollywood Music in Media Awards	Best Music Supervision – Film	Guardians of the Galaxy	Nominated	
2015	Grammy Awards	Best Compilation Soundtrack for Visual Media	Guardians of the Galaxy: Awesome Mix Vol. 1	Nominated	
2015	Hollywood Music in Media Awards	Outstanding Music Supervisor	Empire	Won	
2016	Guild of Music Supervisors Awards	Best Music Supervision for Television	Empire	Won	
2016	Guild of Music Supervisors Awards	Best Original Song	"You're So Beautiful" (Empire)	Won	
2017	Guild of Music Supervisors Awards	Best Music Supervision for Film	Guardians of the Galaxy Vol. 2	Nominated	
2017	Hollywood Music in Media Awards	Best Music Supervision for Film	Guardians of the Galaxy Vol. 2	Nominated	
2018	Guild of Music Supervisors Awards	Best Music Supervision for Film	Black Panther	Nominated	
2018	Hollywood Music in Media Awards	Best Music Supervision for Film	Black Panther	Nominated	
2019	Guild of Music Supervisors Awards	Best Song/Recording Created for a Film	Black Panther	Nominated	
2019	Grammy Awards	Best Compilation Soundtrack For Visual Media	Deadpool 2	Nominated	
2021	Primetime Emmy Awards	Outstanding Music Supervision	WandaVision ("Don't Touch That Dial")	Nominated	
2022	Grammy Awards	Best Compilation Soundtrack for Visual Media	Black Panther: Wakanda Forever – Music from and Inspired By	Nominated	
2022	Hollywood Music in Media Awards	Best Music Supervision for Film	Doctor Strange in the Multiverse of Madness	Nominated	
2023	NAACP Image Awards	Outstanding Soundtrack/Compilation Album	Black Panther: Wakanda Forever – Music from and Inspired By	Won	
2023	African American Film Critics Association Awards	Best Song	"Lift Me Up" (Black Panther: Wakanda Forever)	Won	
2024	Grammy Awards	Best Compilation Soundtrack for Visual Media	Guardians of the Galaxy Vol. 3: Awesome Mix Vol. 3	Nominated	
2024	Hollywood Music in Media Awards	Best Music Supervision for Film	Deadpool & Wolverine	Won	
2025	Grammy Awards	Best Compilation Soundtrack For Visual Media	Deadpool & Wolverine	Nominated	
2025	Guild of Music Supervisors Awards	Best Song Written and/or Recorded for Television	"The Ballad of the Witches' Road" (Agatha All Along)	Won	
2026	MUSEXPO International Music Industry Awards	Global Music Supervisor Award	Career Achievement	Won	
