= Maeve Courtier-Lilley =

Welsh actress

- Born: Aberystwyth, Wales
- Occupation: Actress
- Years active: 2021–present
- Television: Run Away The Red King

Maeve Courtier-Lilley is a Welsh actress. Her television drama roles have included Run Away (2026), The Red King (2024).

== Early life ==
Courtier-Lilley attended school at Ysgol Gymraeg Aberystwyth in Aberystwyth, Wales. She began acting by appearing in stage productions and pantomime productions in her native Aberystwyth.

== Career ==
She made appearances in long-running British television series Doctors and Casualty on BBC One. She had a recurring role in 2021 on season four of The CW series The Outpost, as Luna. She had a lead role as Anna in the 2022 Welsh-language drama series Persona for S4C from Elin Gwyn, which was nominated for Best TV Drama at the 2023 BAFTA Cymru awards.

In 2023, she played Audrey in the film Gran Turismo. She was said to have brought "immense warmth to a role which may in less capable hands have simply been a forgettable love interest", according to Collider.

She appeared as Vanessa in long-running BBC One series Silent Witness in 2024. Courtier-Lilley had a main role in the 2024 British television series The Red King, playing Winter, described by The Guardian as the "Island wild child".

She had the role of Skyler Price in French-set romantic comedy film Champagne Problems alongside Minka Kelly and Tom Wozniczka, with production taking place in France in September 2024 and released in 2025. In January 2025, she was added to the cast of Netflix thriller series Run Away, adapted from the book by Harlan Coben.

== Filmography ==
=== Film ===
Year	Title	Role	Notes
2023	Gran Turismo	Audrey	
2025	Champagne Problems	Skyler Price	
2026	Fortitude	TBA	Post-production

=== Television ===
Year	Title	Role	Notes
2021	Doctors	Sophia Wheatley	Episode: "The Slipped-Fishy-Click-Flip"
2021	The Outpost	Luna	Series 4; 13 episodes
2022	Casualty	Veronica Fairwell	Episodes: "Apron Strings" & "Break Your Heart"
2022	Persona	Anna	6 episodes
2024	Silent Witness	Vanessa	Episodes: "Grievance Culture: Parts 1 & 2"
2024	The Red King	Winter Bain	6 episodes
2025	The Light in the Hall: Still Waters	Mabli	Mini-series; 6 episodes
2026	Run Away	Dee Dee	Mini-series; 7 episodes
