= Scooby-Doo! and WWE: Curse of the Speed Demon =

- DVD cover featuring The Undertaker, Scooby-Doo and Shaggy Rogers on the foreground
- Directed by: Tim Divar
- Screenplay by: E.J. Altbacker
- Story by: Matt Wayne
- Based on: Scooby-Doo by Hanna-Barbera, Joe Ruby, & Ken Spears; Scooby-Doo! WrestleMania Mystery by Michael Ryan
- Produced by: Brandon Vietti; Alan Burnett (co-producer)
- Starring: Frank Welker; Grey DeLisle; Matthew Lillard; Kate Micucci; Michael Cole; Diego; El Torito; Fernando; Goldust; Kofi Kingston; Lana; Stephanie McMahon; The Miz; Paige; Dusty Rhodes; Rusev; Sheamus; Stardust; Triple H Undertaker; Vince McMahon; Eric Bauza; Steve Blum; Phil Morris
- Edited by: Keef Bartkus
- Music by: Ryan Shore
- Production companies: Warner Bros. Animation; WWE Studios
- Distributed by: Warner Home Video
- Release dates: July 23, 2016 (San Diego Comic-Con); July 26, 2016 (Digital); August 9, 2016 (DVD & Blu-ray)
- Running time: 82 minutes
- Country: United States
- Language: English

Scooby-Doo! and WWE: Curse of the Speed Demon (also known as Scooby-Doo! WrestleMania Mystery 2) is a 2016 direct-to-DVD animated sports comedy mystery and the twenty-seventh entry in the direct-to-video series of Scooby-Doo films, as well as a sequel to Scooby-Doo! WrestleMania Mystery. It is a co-production between Warner Bros. Animation and WWE Studios. It premiered at San Diego Comic-Con on July 23, 2016, followed by a digital release on July 26, 2016. It was released on DVD on August 8, 2016, in the United Kingdom. The film was also released on both DVD and Blu-Ray on August 9, 2016, in the United States by Warner Home Video.

== Plot ==
After solving the mystery of the Ghost Bear, (Note: As depicted in Scooby-Doo! WrestleMania Mystery (2014)) Mystery Inc. is seen at WWE's latest event, The Muscle Moto X Off Road Challenge, an off-road race for WWE superstars with bountiful prize money. Scooby-Doo and Shaggy Rogers are there working at a food truck. Many WWE superstars are in the race, including WWE chairman Vince McMahon's own daughter Stephanie and her husband Triple H. Scooby and Shaggy are excited to hear that The Undertaker is going to be in the race.

A demonic racer known as Inferno later appears to sabotage the race. Shaggy and Scooby try to run away with the food from their truck, but before they can, McMahon hires Mystery Inc. to solve this mystery and intends to keep Stephanie out of the race, but she refuses. Daphne Blake becomes friends with Stephanie after they learn about their respective families' wealthy patriarchs, making Velma feel very left out. Undertaker is disappointed that his partner, Dusty Rhodes, was injured in the race and recruits Shaggy and Scooby to be his new partners under the names "Skinny Man" and "Dead Meat", to which they reluctantly agree to at first. However, since Undertaker's race car was also destroyed in Inferno's attack, Fred Jones modifies Shaggy and Scooby's food truck into "The Scoobinator" to replace it.

During the first race, Inferno attacks and Velma, Daphne and Fred notice that McMahon is nowhere to be seen. That night, Scooby and Shaggy are chased by Inferno only to be saved by The Miz. The following morning, Inferno attacks again and Scooby, Shaggy and Undertaker almost drown when The Scoobinator lands in water, but the trio are able to escape in the nick of time. That night, Daphne tells Velma even though she enjoyed hanging out with Stephanie, Velma will always be her best friend. The following day, Fred modifies the Mystery Machine to replace The Scoobinator as he, Daphne and Velma join as additional passengers. Inferno attacks once more and goes after the gang, only for the other WWE stars in the race to gang up on Inferno and attack his race car with theirs as Undertaker takes on the villain. They figure out that he is using radio technology to operate his race car so they create a remote control that disrupts his signal and puts them in control of the vehicle.

Following Inferno's defeat, he is revealed to be Triple H, who had been plotting to win the race by any means necessary, with Stephanie mostly masterminding the plot on account of being furious at McMahon for preventing her from qualifying due to being concerned about her well-being. Even after her father apologizes for his mistake, Stephanie is apprehended for her and Triple H's crimes nonetheless. Soon after, Scooby, Shaggy and Undertaker win the prize money by default.

== Voice cast ==
- Frank Welker as Scooby-Doo and Fred Jones
- Matthew Lillard as Shaggy Rogers
- Grey DeLisle as Daphne Blake
- Kate Micucci as Velma Dinkley
- Undertaker as himself
- Triple H as himself
- Stephanie McMahon as herself
- Goldust as himself
- Sheamus as himself
- Stardust as himself
- Dusty Rhodes as himself (posthumous role)
- The Miz as himself
- Paige as herself
- Diego as himself
- El Torito as himself
- Fernando as himself
- Lana as herself
- Rusev as himself
- Michael Cole as himself
- Kofi Kingston as himself
- Vince McMahon as himself
- Eric Bauza as Big Earl
- Steve Blum as Inferno
- Phil Morris as Walter Qualls

== Production ==
On September 15, 2014, WWE and Warner Bros. announced a direct sequel to WrestleMania Mystery to be released in 2016. In February 2016, it was announced it will be named Scooby-Doo! and WWE: Curse of the Speed Demon. Hulk Hogan was billed to be prominently featured. However, on July 23, 2015, WWE terminated their contract with Hogan due to his racist comments; he has no role in the final version of the film. This film also marks the final film for Dusty Rhodes who already did voicework prior to his death a year before the film's release. It is the third co-production between Warner Bros. Animation and WWE Studios after Scooby-Doo! WrestleMania Mystery and The Flintstones & WWE: Stone Age SmackDown!

The film's original score was composed by its predecessor's composer, Ryan Shore.
