= Golden Reel Award for Outstanding Achievement in Sound Editing – Sound Effects, Foley, Music, Dialogue and ADR for Non-Theatrical Animated Long Form Broadcast Media =

- Country: United States
- Presented by: Motion Picture Sound Editors
- Currently held by: Brad Beaumont, Eliot Connors, Alexander Temple, Shannon Beaumont, Alexander Ephraim, Dan O' Connell, John Cucci, Alex Seaver – Arcane (2021)

The Golden Reel Award for Outstanding Achievement in Sound Editing – Sound Effects, Foley, Music, Dialogue and ADR for Non-Theatrical Animated Long Form Broadcast Media is an annual award given by the Motion Picture Sound Editors. It honors sound editors whose work has warranted merit in the field of cinema; in this case, their work in the field of non-theatrical film; i.e. films that go direct-to-video or direct-to-streaming. The award has been given with its current title since 2018.

A similar award, the Best Sound Editing – Direct to Video – Sound, honored both animated and live-action films from 1999 until 2010.

== Winners and nominees ==
=== 2010s ===
Year	Film	Winners/Nominees
2010	Best Sound Editing – Direct to Video – Animation	
2010	Family Guy: It's a Trap!	Bob Newlan (supervising sound editor); Andrew Ellerd (sound designer); Stuart Martin (sound effects editor); Mark Eklund (dialogue editor); Patrick S. Clark, Stan Jones, Douglas M. Lackey (music editors); Dale W. Perry (Foley artist)
2010	Batman: Under the Red Hood	Robert Hargreaves (supervising sound editor/sound designer); Mark Keatts (supervising dialogue editor); George Brooks (sound effects editor); John Hegedes (Foley editor); Kelly Ann Foley, Mike Garcia (dialogue editors); Gary Marullo (Foley artist)
2010	DC Showcase: Jonah Hex	Benjamin Wynn (supervising sound editor/sound designer); Jeremy Zuckerman (sound designer/music editor); Aran Tanchum (supervising Foley editor); Mark Keatts (supervising dialogue/ADR editor); Carlos Sanches, Otis Van Osten (sound effects editors); R.D. White (Foley editor); Vincent Guisetti (Foley artist)
2010	The Penguins of Madagascar – Operation: Get Ducky- Dr. Blowhole's Revenge	Paulette Victor-Lifton, Jimmy Lifton (supervising sound editors); Ian Nyeste (sound designer); Aran Tanchum (supervising Foley editor); Michael Petak (supervising dialogue editor); Jason Stiff (supervising ADR editor); Matthew Thomas Hall (sound effects editor); Lawrence Reyes (sound effects/Foley editor); D.J. Lynch (dialogue/music editor); Oliver Pearce (dialogue editor); Dominick Certo (music editor); Vincent Guisetti, Monique Reymond (Foley artists)
2010	Tom and Jerry Meet Sherlock Holmes	Robert Hargreaves (supervising sound editor/sound designer/Foley artist); Mark Keatts (supervising dialogue/ADR editor); George Brooks, Rick Hinson (sound effects editors); Kelly Ann Foley, Mike Garcia (dialogue/ADR editors); Michael Tavera (music editor); Gary Marullo (Foley artist)
2011	Megamind: The Button of Doom	John Marquis (supervising sound editor); Tobias Poppe (sound effects editor); Jonathan Klein (Foley editor); Susan Dudeck (ADR editor); Adam Milo Smalley (music editor); John T. Cucci, Dan O'Connell (Foley artists)
2011	Gift of the Night Fury	Jonathan Null (supervising sound editor); Al Nelson (sound designer); Chris Gridley (supervising dialogue editor); Frank Clary, Colette D. Dahanne, Josh Gold (sound effects editors); Adam Milo Smalley (music editor); Dennie Thorpe, Jana Vance (Foley artists)
2011	Kung Fu Panda: Secrets of the Masters	John Marquis (supervising sound editor); Tobias Poppe (sound effects editor); Jonathan Klein (Foley editor); Thomas Jones (ADR editor); Adam Milo Smalley (music editor); John T. Cucci, Dan O'Connell (Foley artists)
2011	Quest for Zhu	Rick Hinson (supervising sound editor), Gary Falcone (supervising Foley editor), Lizzie Hinson (sound editor), Roberto Dominguez Alegria (Foley editor), Cynthia Merrill (Foley artist)
2011	The Smurfs: A Christmas Carol	Robert L. Sephton (supervising sound editor/sound designer); F. Scott Taylor (supervising Foley editor); Bernard Weiser (supervising dialogue/ADR editor); Todd Bozung (music editor); Robin Harlan, Sarah Monat (Foley artists)
2012	Justice League: Doom	Robert Hargreaves (sound designer); Mark Keatts (supervising dialogue editor); George Brooks (sound effects editor); John Hegedes (Foley editor); Kelly Ann Foley, Mike Garcia (dialogue editors); Gary Marullo (Foley artist)
2012	Batman: The Dark Knight Returns – Part 1	Robert Hargreaves (sound designer); Mark Keatts (supervising dialogue editor); George Brooks (sound effects editor); John Hegedes (Foley editor); Kelly Ann Foley, Mike Garcia (dialogue editors); Gary Marullo (Foley artist)
2012	Superman vs. The Elite	Robert Hargreaves (sound designer); Mark Keatts (supervising dialogue editor); George Brooks (sound effects editor); John Hegedes (Foley editor); Kelly Ann Foley, Mike Garcia (dialogue editors); Gary Marullo (Foley artist)
2013	Batman: The Dark Knight Returns – Part 2	Robert Hargreaves (supervising sound editor/sound designer), Mark Keatts (supervising dialogue editor), George Brooks (sound effects editor), John Hegedes (Foley editor), Kelly Ann Foley (dialogue editor), Gary Marullo (Foley artist)
2013	Koala Kid	Eric Lalicata (supervising sound editor); Ian Blackman, Scott A. Jennings (sound designers); John Sanacore (supervising Foley editor); Dhyana Carlton-Tims (supervising dialogue editor); Shaun Cunningham, Kyle Lane (Foley editors); Tara Blume (Foley artist)
2013	Superman: Unbound	Robert Hargreaves (supervising sound editor/sound designer), Mark Keatts (supervising dialogue editor), George Brooks (sound effects editor), John Hegedes (Foley editor), Kelly Ann Foley (dialogue editor), Gary Marullo (Foley artist)
2014	Star Wars: The Clone Wars- Sacrifice	Matthew Wood (supervising sound editor), David Acord (sound designer), Kevin Sellers (supervising Foley editor), Steve Slanec (supervising dialogue/ADR editor), Dean Menta (supervising music editor), Jeremy Bowker (sound effects editor), Sean Kiner (music editor)
2014	The Boxcar Children	Tom Boykin, Eric Lalicata (supervising sound editors); Ryan Gegenheimer (sound designer); Kyle Lane (supervising Foley editor); Dhyana Carlton-Tims (dialogue/ADR editor); Tara Blume (Foley artist)
2014	The Pirate Fairy	Todd Toon (supervising sound editor/sound designer); Thomas Whiting (supervising dialogue/ADR editor); Charles Martin Inouye (supervising music editor); Odin Benitez, Adam Kopald, Charles W. Ritter, Pernell L. Salinas (sound effects editors); Jim Harrison (music editor); Alyson Dee Moore, John Roesch (Foley artists)
2014	Rainbow Brite	Eric Marks (supervising sound editor)
2014	Scooby-Doo! WrestleMania Mystery	Devon Bowman, Rob McIntyre (supervising sound editors); Aran Tanchum (supervising Foley editor); Kelly Ann Foley (supervising dialogue/ADR editor); Mark Keatts (supervising dialogue editor); Mike Garcia (supervising ADR editor); Ryan Shore (supervising music editor); Jessey Drake, James Lucero, Michael Kreple, Marc Schmidt (sound effects editors); Vincent Guisetti (Foley artist)
2015	Tinker Bell and the Legend of the NeverBeast	Todd Toon (supervising sound editor/sound designer); Martyn Zub (sound designer/sound effects editor); Thomas Whiting (supervising dialogue editor); Charles Martin Inouye (supervising music editor); Charlie Campagna, Adam Kopald, Charles W. Ritter, Pernell L. Salinas (sound effects editors); Dominick Certo, Jim Harrison, Tommy Holmes (music editors); Shelley Roden, John Roesch (Foley artists)
2015	Die drei Räuber	Paulette Victor-Lifton (supervising sound/dialogue editor); Frank Kruse, Sal Ojeda (sound effects editors); Gabriel Aronson, Scott Brewster, James Gallivan, Paul Mason, Jamison Rabbe, Terrence Stone, Genoveva Winsen (dialogue/ADR editors); Deron Johnson (music editor); Carsten Richter (Foley artist)
2015	Lego DC Comics Super Heroes: Justice League – Attack of the Legion of Doom	Devon Bowman (supervising sound editor); Rob McIntyre (sound designer); Aran Tanchum (supervising Foley editor); Tim Kelly (supervising music editor); Jessey Drake, D.J. Lynch, Lawrence Reyes (sound effects editors); Tara Blume, Vincent Guisetti (Foley artists)
2015	The Magic Snowflake	Paulette Victor-Lifton (supervising sound editor/dialogue/ADR editor); Felix Davin (sound designer); James Gallivan, Paul Mason, Sal Ojeda, Jamison Rabbe, Terrence Stone, Genoveva Winsen (dialogue/ADR editors); Julien Billeau (Foley artist)
2015	Marvel Super Hero Adventures: Frost Fight!	Stephen P. Robinson (supervising sound editor/sound designer); Mike Draghi (supervising sound editor); Marcos Abrom (sound designer); Roberto Dominguez Alegria, Maciek Malish (supervising Foley editors); John Brengman (supervising dialogue editor); Michael Emter (sound effects editor); Mark Mattson (music editor); Nancy Parker, Monique Reymond (Foley artists)
2015	Santa's Apprentice	Paulette Victor-Lifton (supervising sound/dialogue/ADR editor); Arnaud Roy (supervising ADR editor); Sal Ojeda (sound effects editor); James Gallivan, Paul Mason, Jamison Rabbe, Terrence Stone (ADR editors); Christophe Burdet (Foley artist)
2016	Lego DC Comics Super Heroes: Justice League – Gotham City Breakout	Devon Bowman, Rob McIntyre (supervising sound editors); Mark Keatts (supervising dialogue editor); Evan Dockter, D.J. Lynch, Lawrence Reyes, Marc Schmidt (sound effects editors); Aran Tanchum (Foley editor); Kelly Ann Foley, Patrick J. Foley, Mike Garcia (dialogue editors); Vincent Guisetti (Foley artist)
2016	Batman: Bad Blood	Otis Van Osten (supervising sound editor); Matthew Thomas Hall (sound designer); Mark Keatts (supervising dialogue/ADR editor); Gerardo Gonzalez, Carlos Sanches (sound effects editors); Robert Monkress (Foley editor); Mike Garcia (dialogue editor)
2016	Lego DC Comics Super Heroes: Justice League – Cosmic Clash	Rob McIntyre (supervising sound editor); Evan Dockter, Gregory Hainer, Lawrence Reyes (sound designers); Mark Keatts (supervising dialogue editor); Tim Kelly (supervising music editor); Marc Schmidt (sound effects editor); Aran Tanchum (Foley editor); Kelly Ann Foley, Patrick J. Foley, Mike Garcia (dialogue editors); Vincent Guisetti (Foley artist)
2016	Open Season: Scared Silly	Geoffrey G. Rubay (supervising sound editor), Ryan Collins (sound designer), James Morioka (supervising dialogue editor), Alec Rubay (sound effects editor), Matt Friedman (music editor), Gregg Barbanell (Foley artist)
2016	Space Dogs: Adventure to the Moon	Paul Hollman (supervising sound editor), Dan Snow (audio lead), Josh Ellis (sound effects editor), Elliot Herman (dialogue editor), Jody Berglund (Foley artist)
2017	Outstanding Achievement in Sound Editing – Sound Effects, Foley, Music, Dialogue and ADR for Non-Theatrical Animated Long Form Broadcast Media	
2017	Lego DC Super Hero Girls: Brain Drain	Devon Bowman (supervising sound editor); Rob McIntyre (sound designer); Mark Keatts (supervising dialogue editor); Evan Dockter, D.J. Lynch, Lawrence Reyes, Marc Schmidt, Joel Waters (sound effects editors); Matthew Saiz, Aran Tanchum (Foley editors); David M. Cowan, Kelly Ann Foley, Patrick J. Foley, Mike Garcia (dialogue editors); George Peters (ADR editor); Bijan Olia (music editor); Vincent Guisetti (Foley artist)
2017	Justice League Dark	Otis Van Osten (supervising sound editor); Matthew Thomas Hall (sound designer); Christine H. Luethje (supervising music editor); Mark Keatts (supervising dialogue/ADR editor); Josh Eckberg, Greg Rubin, Ron Salaises, Carlos Sanches (sound effects editors); Dan Smith (Foley editor); David M. Cowan, Kelly Ann Foley, Patrick J. Foley, Mike Garcia (dialogue editors); Jonathan Abelardo, Mark Mercado (ADR editors); Robert J. Kral (scoring editor); Stacey Michaels, Alex Ullrich (Foley artists)
2017	Teenage Mutant Ninja Turtles: Mutant Apocalypse	Jeff Shiffman (supervising sound editor); Jessey Drake, Brad Meyer (sound effects editors); Roger Pallan (Foley editor); Jacob Cook, Elliot Herman (dialogue editors); Sebastian Evans (music editor)
2017	Teen Titans: The Judas Contract	Devon Bowman (supervising sound editor); Rob McIntyre (sound designer); Mark Keatts (supervising dialogue editor); Evan Dockter, Gregory Hainer, D.J. Lynch, Peter Munters, Lawrence Reyes (sound effects editors); David M. Cowan, Kelly Ann Foley, Mike Garcia, Derek Swanson (dialogue editors); Vincent Guisetti, Aran Tanchum (Foley artist)
2017	Trollhunters: Tales of Arcadia	Matthew Thomas Hall (supervising sound editor); Jason Oliver (supervising dialogue editor); Goeun Lee, James Miller (sound effects editors); Aran Tanchum (Foley editor); Carlos Sanches (dialogue editor); Vincent Guisetti (Foley artist)
2018	Next Gen	David Acord, Steve Slanec (supervising sound editors/sound designers); Pascal Garneau, Kimberly Patrick (sound effects editors); Ryan J. Frias, Richard Gould, James Likowski (Foley editors); Qianbaihui Yang (dialogue editor); Sebastian Zuleta (music editor); Ronni Brown, Margie O'Malley (Foley artists)
2018	Batman: Gotham by Gaslight	Robert Hargreaves (sound designer); Mark Keatts (supervising dialogue editor); John Hegedes (Foley editor); Mike Garcia (dialogue editor); Jonathan Abelardo, Mark Mercado (ADR editors)
2018	The Death of Superman	Devon Bowman, Rob McIntyre (supervising sound editors); Mark Keatts (supervising dialogue editor); Evan Dockter, Alfredo Douglas, D.J. Lynch, Peter Munters, Ian Nyeste, Joel Waters (sound effects editors); Aran Tanchum (Foley editor); David M. Cowan, Kelly Ann Foley, Patrick J. Foley, Mike Garcia, John Reynolds (dialogue editors); Jonathan Abelardo, Mark Mercado (ADR editors); Vincent Guisetti (Foley artist)
2018	Lego DC Comics Super Heroes: The Flash	Devon Bowman, Rob McIntyre (supervising sound editors); Mark Keatts (supervising dialogue editor); Evan Dockter, Andrew Ing, Lawrence Reyes, Marc Schmidt, Ezra Walker (sound effects editors); Aran Tanchum (Foley editor); Kelly Ann Foley, Patrick J. Foley, Mike Garcia, John Reynolds (dialogue editors); George Peters (ADR editors); Vincent Guisetti (Foley artist)
2018	Lego DC Super Hero Girls: Super-Villain High	Devon Bowman, Rob McIntyre (supervising sound editors); Mark Keatts (supervising dialogue editor); Evan Dockter, Ian Nyeste, George Peters, Lawrence Reyes, Derek Swanson (sound effects editors); David M. Cowan, Kelly Ann Foley, Patrick J. Foley, Mike Garcia, John Reynolds (dialogue editors); Jonathan Abelardo, Mark Mercado, Peter Munters (ADR editors); Robert J. Kral (music editor); Vincent Guisetti (Foley artist)
2018	Suicide Squad: Hell to Pay	Devon Bowman, Rob McIntyre (supervising sound editors); Evan Dockter, Ian Nyeste, Lawrence Reyes (sound effects editors); Alfredo Douglas, Aran Tanchum (Foley editors); Greg Crawford (dialogue editor); Jonathan Abelardo, Mark Mercado (ADR editors); Christine H. Luethje (music editor); Vincent Guisetti (Foley artist)
2018	Trollhunters: Tales of Arcadia	Matthew Thomas Hall (supervising sound editor); Jason Oliver (supervising dialogue editor); James Miller (sound effects editor); Carlos Sanches (dialogue editor); Stacey Michaels, Aran Tanchum (Foley editors); Vincent Guisetti, Alex Ullrich (Foley artists)
2019	Lego DC Batman: Family Matters	D.J. Lynch, Rob McIntyre (supervising sound editors); Lawrence Reyes (sound designer); Ezra Walker (sound effects editor); Derek Swanson, Aran Tanchum (Foley editors); George Peters (ADR editor); Vincent Guisetti (Foley artist)
2019	Batman: Hush	D.J. Lynch, Rob McIntyre (supervising sound editors); Evan Dockter (sound designer); Lawrence Reyes, Derek Swanson (sound effects editors); Alfredo Douglas, Aran Tanchum (Foley editors); Vincent Guisetti (Foley artist)
2019	Batman vs. Teenage Mutant Ninja Turtles	Jeff Shiffman (supervising sound editor); Mark Keatts (supervising ADR editor); Jessey Drake, Kevin A. Hart, Mitchell Lestner (sound effects editors); Kelly Ann Foley (dialogue editor), Patrick J. Foley (dialogue editor), Mike Garcia (dialogue editor), Tess Fournier (Foley editor)
2019	Invader Zim: Enter the Florpus	Kate Finan, Jeff Shiffman (supervising sound editors); Jessey Drake, Tess Fournier, Benjamin Gieschen, Mitchell Lestner, Greg Rubin (sound effects editors); Carol Ma (Foley editor); Jonathan Hylander (dialogue editor)
2019	Lucky	Jeff Shiffman (supervising sound editor); Tess Fournier, Brad Meyer (sound effects editors); Carol Ma (Foley editor); Michael Wessner (dialogue editor)
2019	Reign of the Supermen	D.J. Lynch, Rob McIntyre (supervising sound editors); Evan Dockter (sound designer); Ezra Walker (sound effects editor); Alfredo Douglas, Aran Tanchum (Foley editors); Vincent Guisetti (Foley artist)
2019	Wonder Woman: Bloodlines	D.J. Lynch, Rob McIntyre (supervising sound editors); Evan Dockter (sound designer); Ezra Walker (sound effects editor); Alfredo Douglas, Aran Tanchum (Foley editors); Vincent Guisetti (Foley artist)

=== 2020s ===
Year	Film/Series	Episode	Winners/Nominees	Network
2020	Mortal Kombat Legends: Scorpion's Revenge		D.J. Lynch, Rob McIntyre (supervising sound editors); Evan Dockter, Marc Schmidt (sound designers); Mark A. Keatts (supervising ADR editor); Roger Pallan, Lawrence Reyes, Ezra Walker (sound effects editors); Roberto Allegria, Derek Swanson (Foley editors); David M. Cowan, Kelly Foley Downs, Patrick Foley, Mike Garcia (dialogue editors); Jon Abelardo, Mark Mercado (ADR editors)	Warner Bros.
2020	The Boss Baby: Get That Baby!		Jeff Shiffman (supervising sound editor); Ian Howard, Greg Rubin (sound effects editors); Carol Ma (Foley editor); Kerry Iverson-Brody, Xinyue Yu (dialogue editors)	Netflix
2020	The Epic Tales of Captain Underpants:The Xtreme Xploits of the Xplosive Xmas		Jeff Shiffman (supervising sound editor); Kerry Iverson-Brody (supervising dialogue editor); Jessey Drake, Greg Rubin (sound effects editors); Carol Ma (Foley editor); Xinyue Yu (dialogue editor)	Netflix
2020	Batman: Death in the Family		Devon Bowman (supervising sound editor); Robert Hargreaves (sound designer); Mark A. Keatts (supervising ADR editor); Alfredo Douglas, George Peters (sound effects editors); Kelly Foley Downs, Patrick Foley (dialogue editors); John Reynolds (ADR editor); Christopher Drake (music editor)	Warner Bros.
2020	Ducktales: Let's Get Dangerous!		Jeff Shiffman (supervising sound editor), Katie Maynard (sound effects editor), Carol Ma (Foley editor), Xinyue Yu (dialogue editor)	Disney XD
2020	The Loud House: Schooled!		Tess Fournier (supervising sound editor/sound effects editor); Katie Maynard, Brad Meyer, Tim Vindigni (sound effects editors); Carol Ma (Foley editor); John Deligiannis (dialogue editor)	Nickelodeon
2020	To Your Last Death		Michael Archacki (supervising sound designer/editor), Matthew Schaff (sound editor)	Quirk Pictures
2021	Outstanding Achievement in Sound Editing – Non-Theatrical Animation			
2021	Arcane	"When These Walls Come Tumbling Down"	Brad Beaumont, Eliot Connors (supervising sound editors); Alexander Temple (supervising music editor); Shannon Beaumont (supervising ADR editor); Alexander Ephraim (Foley editor); Dan O' Connell, John Cucci (Foley artists); Alex Seaver (music editor)	Netflix
2021	Lego Star Wars: Terrifying Tales		David W. Collins, Matthew Wood (supervising sound editors/sound effects); Justin Doyle, Bonnie Wild (sound effects editors); Frank Rinella (Foley editor); Kimberly Patrick, Andrea Gard (Foley artists)	Disney+
2021	What If...?	"What If... Doctor Strange Lost His Heart Instead of His Hands?"	Mac Smith (supervising sound editor); Bill Rudolph, Alyssa Nevarez (sound effects editors); Cheryl Nardi (dialogue editor); Anele Onyekwere (supervising music editor); Tom Kramer (music editor); John Roesch, Shelley Roden (Foley artists)	Disney+
2021	Maya and the Three	"Chapter 9: The Sun and the Moon"	Scott Martin Gershin (supervising sound editor); Chris Richardson, Andrew Vernon, Scott Martin Gershin (sound designers); David Barbee, Masanobu "Tomi" Tomita (sound effects editors); Dan O'Connell (Foley artist); Andres Locsey (music editor)	Netflix
2021	White Snake 2: The Tribulation of the Green Snake		Gary Chen (supervising sound editor; sound designer); Wang Shuangshuang, Gary Chen, Mango Mok, Ji Hongrui, Irene Sun, Qiu Yi (sound effects editors); Listen Zhang, Liu Huizhe (ADR editors); Liu Huizhe, Cui Lin (Foley editors); Wang Ziwei, Miao Yin, Zhang Jindong, Xin Shengnan (Foley artists)	Netflix
2022	Rise of the Teenage Mutant Ninja Turtles: The Movie		Jeff Shiffman (supervising sound editor); Jessey Drake, Brad Meyer (sound effects editor); Xinyue Yu (dialogue editor); Carol Ma (Foley editor)	Netflix
2022	The Ice Age Adventures of Buck Wild		Leff Lefferts (supervising sound editor); Shaun Farley, Chris Manning (sound effects editors); E. Larry Oatfield (dialogue editor); John Roesch, Ronni Brown, Sean England (Foley artist)	Disney+
2022	Lego Star Wars: Summer Vacation		David W. Collins, Matthew Wood (supervising sound editors/sound designers); Kevin Bolen, Bill Rudolph (sound effects editors); Eryne Prine (Foley editor); Frank Rinella (Foley supervisor); Margie O'Malley (Foley artist)	Disney+
2022	Jurassic World Camp Cretaceous	"Hidden Adventure"	Rob McIntyre, D.J. Lynch (supervising sound editors); Evan Dockter (sound designer); Adam Cioffi, Ian Nyeste, Cat Gensler, Roger Pallan (sound effects editors); Anna Adams (dialogue editor); Aran Tanchum (Foley editor)	Netflix
