= Ellie de Lange =

Dutch-British actress (born 1997/1998)

- Born: 1997/1998 (age 28–29); Swindon, England
- Occupation: Actress

Ellie de Lange (born 1997/1998) is a Dutch-British television actress. Her appearances have included The Serpent (2021), Arcadia (2023), and Wolf Hall: The Mirror and the Light (2024).

== Early life ==
Born in Swindon, England, Ellie de Lange moved to Arnhem in the Netherlands at a young age.

== Career ==
In 2021, De Lange appeared in the true crime television series The Serpent alongside Jenna Coleman and Ellie Bamber. She appeared in the 2023 Belgian-Dutch television series Arcadia. The following year, she portrayed Esther in the television adaptation of The Tattooist of Auschwitz.

De Lange appeared as Jenneke in the Hilary Mantel adaptation Wolf Hall: The Mirror and the Light (2024). She has a leading role as Paige, the runaway daughter, in the Netflix adaptation of Harlan Coben's Run Away alongside James Nesbitt and Minnie Driver. In July 2025, she was cast in the second series of 3 Body Problem.

== Filmography ==
Television roles, unless otherwise noted.

Key
†	Denotes television productions that have not yet been released

Year	Title	Role	Notes
2015	Charlotte98	Marlies	Short film
2017	Moordvrouw	Christy Geelen	Episode: "Dromenvanger"
2017	Centraal Medisch Centrum	Devika	2 episodes
2018	Het geheime dagboek van Hendrik Groen	Stagiaire Meta	Episode: "November"
2019	Flikken Maastricht	Angie	Episode: "Hankie"
2019	Mees Kees in de wolken	Marie Louise	Feature film
2019	De Kus	Liesbeth	Short film
2019–2020	Keizersvrouwen	Xandra	Recurring role
2020–2021	Oorlog-stories	Mieke	Main cast (series 1)
2020	Mees Kees	Marie Louise	Recurring role (season 2)
2021	The Serpent	Helena Dekker	Recurring role
2021	Human Superfood	Nine	Pilot episode
2021	Follow de SOA	Marieke	Recurring role
2021	Herrie in Huize Gerri	Stagiair Skaf TV	Feature film
2022	Het verhaal van Nederland	Gundrun	Episode: "Romeinen en Batavenn"
2022	Jos	Claire	Main cast
2022	Zeebenen	Sien	Short film
2023	Hockeyvaders	Maartje Biesheuvel	Main cast
2023–2025	Arcadia	Hanna Jans	Main cast
2024	De Joodse Raad	Mirjam Cohen	Miniseries, main cast
2024	The Tattooist of Auschwitz	Esther	1 episode
2024	Motorengel	Juna	Short film
2024	Wolf Hall: The Mirror and the Light	Jenneke	Recurring role
2026	Run Away	Paige Greene	Main cast
TBA	3 Body Problem	TBA	series 2, filming †
