= Stan Helsing =

Canadian-American horror comedy movie

- Theatrical release poster
- Directed by: Bo Zenga
- Written by: Bo Zenga
- Produced by: Bo Zenga; Devon Delapp
- Starring: Steve Howey; Diora Baird; Kenan Thompson; Desi Lydic; Leslie Nielsen
- Cinematography: Robert C. New
- Edited by: Dennis M. Hill; Sterling Scott
- Music by: Ryan Shore
- Production companies: Stone Village Pictures; Boz Productions; Insight Film Studios
- Distributed by: Anchor Bay Entertainment
- Release dates: October 20, 2009 (ArcLight Theater); October 23, 2009 (United States)
- Running time: 81 minutes
- Countries: United States; Canada
- Language: English
- Budget: $365,000
- Box office: $1.5 million

Stan Helsing (released in some countries Mega Monster Movie or Horror Movie) is a 2009 Canadian-American horror comedy film written and directed by Bo Zenga. It stars Steve Howey, Diora Baird, Kenan Thompson, Desi Lydic, and Leslie Nielsen.

Stan Helsing premiered at the ArcLight Theater in Los Angeles, California on October 20, 2009, and received a limited theatrical release on October 23 by Anchor Bay Entertainment. The film received negative reviews from critics.

== Plot ==
Stan Helsing (Steve Howey) is an underachieving employee at a video rental store named Schlockbuster whose personal mottos are "don't get involved" and "don't talk about it". His teen-aged boss Sully orders him to drop off a bag of films to the mother of the store's owner or risk being fired. Despite his arguments, he agrees to the request and convinces his friend Teddy (Kenan Thompson), his ex-girlfriend Nadine (Diora Baird), and ditzy blonde massage therapist Mia (Desi Lydic) to take him there before they attend a Halloween party, even though it is on the other side of town.

En route, the group encounters a traffic jam and, to Stan's surprise, he spots a living doll (a parody of Chucky, played by Jeff Gulka), who makes obscene gestures that no one else notices in the van of a MILF next to them. Because of this disturbance, they miss their exit and decide to take a shortcut. While trying to find their way, they hit a dog named "Sammy Boy" and ask a passerby for help, unaware that he is the dog's owner. The owner then threatens to kill them for murdering his beloved dog. After fleeing the scene, Teddy picks up a hitchhiker, but after learning he was convicted of murdering nurses they violently throw him from the moving vehicle. They come across a gas station where the perverted owners tell Stan that he may be related to the legendary Abraham Van Helsing, the monster hunter. They depart and find Stormy Night Estates, only to discover that the attendants never put gas into the car. They find a local bar and meet the ire of the townsfolk in a bad attempt of karaoke while singing Johnny Cash's song "Ring of Fire".

After they leave, they discover that all the citizens, including their waitress, Kay (Leslie Nielsen), were actually dead due to a massive fire that consumed the town ten years earlier. They encounter several monsters, including the living doll they encountered earlier and parodies of Pinhead, Jason Voorhees, Freddy Krueger, Leatherface, and Michael Myers. They stumble into a church and encounter an altar boy who informs Stan of his destiny, confirms that he is Van Helsing's descendant, and kicks them out of his church after giving them weapons to fight the monsters.

The townsfolk offer a competition in which Stan and his friends compete against the monsters in karaoke. The monsters sing "Y.M.C.A.", with lyrics describing their desire to kill Stan, and the humans respond with "I Don't Wanna Go Home" by Southside Johnny and the Asbury Jukes, modified to express their desire to simply leave. The humans are unanimously voted as the winners, but the monsters refuse to leave town. Eschewing his policy of never getting involved, Stan turns each of the monsters' weaknesses against them, soundly defeating them and feeding them to Sammy, who had been brought back to vicious life (a la Pet Sematary). The group calls a cab and they leave the town as heroes. During the trip home, Nadine realizes how much she cares for Stan and kisses him. Teddy suggests kissing Mia, but she rebuffs with a lap dance offer instead which he gladly accepts. The movie ends with the taxi cab driving away and the sound of moaning.

== Cast ==
- Steve Howey as Stan Helsing
- Diora Baird as Nadine
- Kenan Thompson as Teddy
- Desi Lydic as Mia
- Leslie Nielsen as Kay
- Travis MacDonald as Hitcher
- Chad Krowchuk as Sully
- Darren Moore as Crazy
- Jeremy Crittenden as Altar Boy
- Jeff Gulka as Lucky (spoof of Chucky from Child's Play)
- Ken Kirzinger as Mason (spoof of Jason Voorhees from Friday the 13th)
- Ben Cotton as Fweddy (spoof of Freddy Krueger from A Nightmare on Elm Street)
- Lee Tichon as Michael Cryers (spoof of Michael Myers from Halloween)
- Twan Holliday as Pleatherface (spoof of Leatherface from The Texas Chainsaw Massacre)
- Charles Zuckermann as Needlehead (spoof of Pinhead from Hellraiser)
- Hilary Strang as Hippie Lady
- Ray G. Thunderchild as Husband
- John DeSantis as Frankenstein's Monster
- Ryan Steele as the Wolfman
- Jeremiah Sird as Idiot Indian

== Parodies ==
=== 1970s ===
- The Texas Chain Saw Massacre (1974)
- Jaws (1975)
- Halloween (1978)

=== 1980s ===
- Cujo (1983)
- Hellraiser (1987)
- Pet Sematary (1989)

=== 1990s ===
- The Bodyguard (1992)
- From Dusk till Dawn (1996)
- Bride of Chucky (1998)
- The Blair Witch Project (1999)

=== 2000s ===
- Jeepers Creepers (2001)
- The Ring (2002)
- Freddy vs. Jason (2003)
- Van Helsing (2004)

== Music ==
=== Soundtrack ===
Although no soundtrack album was released, the film includes songs by Pluto, The Saturday Knights, Davernoise and covers of songs by Johnny Cash, Patsy Cline and Village People.

The music was composed by Ryan Shore.

== Reception ==
=== Box office ===
The movie had a production budget of $365,000 and grossed a worldwide total of $1,553,556.

=== Critical response ===
Stan Helsing was panned by critics. It holds a rating of 14% "rotten" on Rotten Tomatoes based on 21 reviews, with an average rating of 2.63/10. Robert Abele wrote in the Los Angeles Times, "writer-director Bo Zenga's way with jokes is no different than that of a 5-year-old pointing at dog poop, who grows into a teenager tittering at underwear, who becomes a middle-aged, raincoated misogynist. Like garlic, holy water and silver bullets for our mythic evildoers, "Stan Helsing" is a surefire repellent to any good time." The Toronto Star panned the film, calling it “so unfunny it's scary” noting that Zenga was “the same hack who thought it would be hilarious to exploit every vulgar racial stereotype in the dismal Soul Plane.”

== See also ==
- List of films set around Halloween
