= Ryan Shore =

Canadian composer

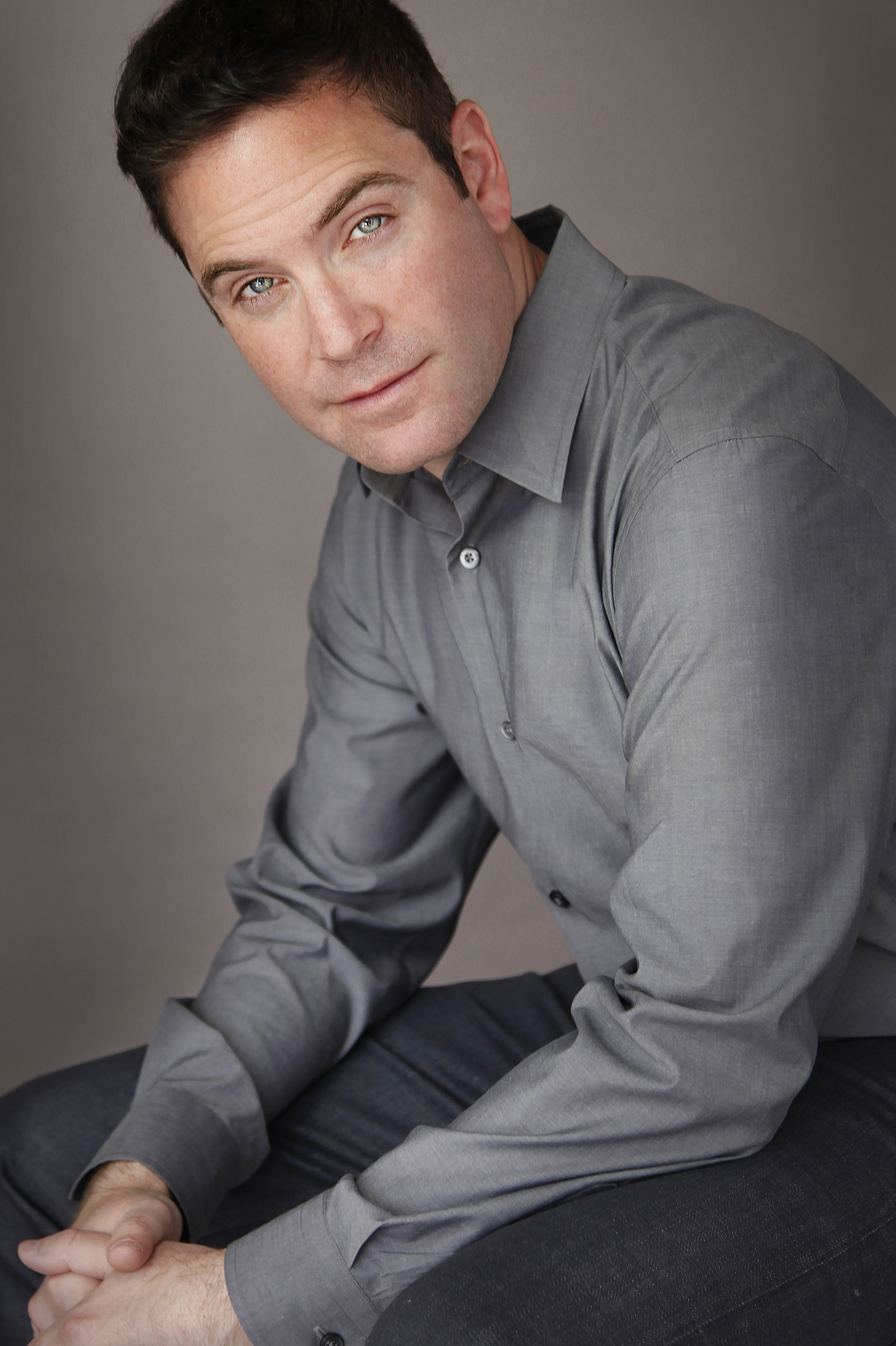

Background information
- Born: Ryan Powell Shore; December 29, 1974 (age 51); Toronto, Ontario, Canada
- Education: Berklee College of Music (BMus)
- Genres: film, television, virtual reality, video games, musical theater, records, concert hall
- Occupations: composer, songwriter, conductor, music producer
- Instruments: saxophone; piano
- Years active: 1996-present
- Website: www.ryanshore.com

Ryan Shore is a Canadian composer, songwriter, conductor, music producer, and music director for film, television, virtual reality, records, games, concerts, and theater. He is often known from his scores for Star Wars, Scooby-Doo!, Elmo, and Go! Go! Cory Carson. He is the nephew of Academy Award winning film composer Howard Shore.

Shore's accolades include three Emmy Award nominations, a Grammy Award nomination, two Hollywood Music in Media Awards, two Telly Awards, an ASCAP Award, and a Thailand Academy Award. He is a Yamaha Artist and a graduate of the Berklee College of Music.

== Music career ==
Shore attended the Berklee College of Music in Boston on a full-tuition scholarship, receiving a Bachelor of Arts major in Film Scoring.

Shore was Assistant Music Director and Contributing Composer/Arranger/Orchestrator for the 87th Academy Awards, where he worked with Lady Gaga, John Legend, Adam Levine, Anna Kendrick, Common, Tim McGraw, Jack Black, Neil Patrick Harris, and Jennifer Hudson.

Shore's 100+ composing credits include the Lin-Manuel Miranda movie musical In the Heights (additional music), Mark Steven Johnson's romantic comedy features Champagne Problems (Netflix), Love in the Villa (Netflix), and Love, Guaranteed (Netflix), Simon West's Bride Hard starring Rebel Wilson, The Not-Too-Late Show with Elmo (HBO Max), Star Wars Galaxy of Adventures (Lucasfilm), Star Wars Forces of Destiny (Lucasfilm), Prime (Universal) starring Meryl Streep, score and songs for Go! Go! Cory Carson (Netflix), Julie's Greenroom (Netflix) starring Julie Andrews with all new puppets from the Jim Henson Company, score and songs for Penn Zero: Part-Time Hero (Disney), Scooby-Doo! WrestleMania Mystery (Warner Bros), Scooby-Doo! and WWE: Curse of the Speed Demon (Warner Bros), Monsterville: Cabinet of Souls (Universal)(Emmy Award nomination, Outstanding Music Direction and Composition), Spy Hunter (Warner Bros), The Shrine (Grammy Award nomination, Best Score), Veselka: The Rainbow on the Corner at the Center of the World featuring saxophone solos by David Sanborn, Cop and a Half: New Recruit (Universal), Harvard Man (Lionsgate), and The Girl Next Door (Anchor Bay). He also composed on-camera music for Fur, starring Nicole Kidman and Robert Downey, Jr., and was seen in the film performing his original music.

In addition to his composing work, Shore has conducted orchestras in recordings and concerts including The New York Philharmonic, The Hollywood Symphony Orchestra, The Skywalker Symphony Orchestra, The Czech Philharmonic, as well as conducting concerts for Pokémon: Symphonic Evolutions and Soundtracks Live! featuring music from Star Wars: The Force Awakens.

Shore's Broadway and theater work include orchestrations and arrangements for Broadway concerts starring Tony Award winners Sutton Foster, Idina Menzel, Whoopi Goldberg, Matthew Broderick, Kristin Chenoweth, Heather Headley, and Faith Prince, as well as music directing the Los Angeles production of Heathers: The Musical, directed by Andy Fickman.

Shore plays saxophone and has performed with artists including John Williams, Matchbox Twenty, Barry Manilow, Johnny Mathis, Natalie Cole, Dave Koz, Arturo Sandoval, Gerry Mulligan, Ana Gasteyer, Mark Ballas, Bob Brookmeyer, George Russell, Gary Burton, and Clark Terry.

== Personal life ==
Shore is the nephew of film composer Howard Shore. He is a certified private pilot.

== Awards and recognition ==
=== Emmy Awards ===
Year	Event	Award	Title	Result	Ref.
2023	Emmy Awards	Outstanding Sound Mixing and Sound Editing for a Preschool Animated Program	Go! Go! Cory Carson	Nominated	
2016	Emmy Awards	Outstanding Music Direction and Composition	Monsterville: Cabinet of Souls	Nominated	
2013	Emmy Awards	Outstanding Promotional Announcement	P.O.V.	Nominated	

=== Grammy Awards ===
Year	Event	Award	Title	Result	Ref.
2012	Grammy Awards	Best Score Soundtrack	The Shrine	Nominated	

=== Other awards ===
Year	Event	Award	Title	Result	Ref.
2023	Canadian Screen Awards	Best Achievement in Music - Original Score	R.L. Stine's ZombieTown	Nominated	
2023	Music+Sound Awards	Best Original Feature Score	Love in the Villa	Nominated	
2021	Telly Awards	Bronze - Motivational - Best Non-Broadcast	World Woman Hour #Looking Up	Won	
2021	Hollywood Music In Media Awards	Best Song Documentary	World Woman Hour #Looking Up	Nominated	
2019	Thailand National Film Association	Best Score	The Legend of Muay Thai: 9 SATRA	Won	
2019	ASCAP Screen Music Awards	Top Cable Television Series	Star Wars: Forces of Destiny	Won	
2016	Reel Music Awards	Best Score	R.L. Stine's Monsterville: Cabinet of Souls	Nominated	
2015	Golden Reel Awards	Best Direct to Video Animation	Scooby-Doo: Wrestlemania Mystery!	Won	
2015	Telly Awards	Best Music Composition	Vivitar	Won	
2012	Hollywood Music In Media Awards	Best Video Game Score	Spy Hunter	Nominated	
2012	Global Music Award	Award of Excellence	Spy Hunter	Won	
2010	Park City International Music Festival	Best Score	Stan Helsing	Nominated	
2009	Fangoria Chainsaw Awards	Best Score	Jack Brooks: Monster Slayer	Nominated	
2008	Park City International Music Festival	Outstanding Achievement in Film Music	Numb	Won	
2008	Park City International Music Festival	Outstanding Achievement in Film Music	Shadows	Won	
2008	Park City International Music Festival	Outstanding Achievement in Film Music	Jack Brooks: Monster Slayer	Won	
2008	Park City International Music Festival	Outstanding Achievement in Film Music	The Girl Next Door	Won	
2007	Film & TV Music Awards	Best Score for an Indie Feature Film	Numb	Nominated	
2004	Rhode Island International Film Festival	Best Score	Rex Steele: Nazi Smasher	Won	
2004	First Run Film Festival	Best Score	Rex Steele: Nazi Smasher	Won	
2002	Clive Davis Award	Best Score	Shadowplay	Won	
2001	Elmer Bernstein Award	Best Score	Cadaverous	Won	

== Filmography ==
Year	Title	Studio	Production	Ref.
2026	I, Object	Scythia Films	Film	
2025	Champagne Problems	Netflix	Film	
2025	Bride Hard	Magenta Light Studios	Film	
2024	Veselka: The Rainbow on the Corner at the Center of the World	Fiore Media Group	Film	
2023	R.L. Stine's ZombieTown	Trimuse Entertainment	Film	
2022	Trick or Treat Scooby-Doo!	Warner Bros.	Film	
2022	Love in the Villa	Netflix	Film	
2021	In the Heights (additional music)	Warner Bros.	Film	
2021	Honey Girls	Sony	Film	
2020	Star Wars: Galaxy of Adventures	Lucasfilm / Disney	Television	
2020	Star Wars: Galaxy of Adventures Fun Facts	Lucasfilm / Disney	Television	
2020	The Not-Too-Late Show with Elmo	HBO Max	Television	
2020	Go! Go! Cory Carson	Netflix	Television	
2020	Love, Guaranteed	Netflix	Film	
2018	Star Wars: Forces of Destiny	Lucasfilm / Disney	Television	
2017	Tiny Christmas	Nickelodeon	Film	
2017	Cop and a Half: New Recruit	Universal	Film	
2017	Julie's Greenroom	Netflix / The Jim Henson Company	Television	
2016	Scooby-Doo! and WWE: Curse of the Speed Demon	Warner Bros.	Film	
2016	Floyd Norman: An Animated Life	Netflix	Film	
2015	88th Academy Awards	ABC	Television	
2015	Penn Zero: Part-Time Hero	Disney Television Animation	Television	
2015	R.L. Stine's Monsterville: Cabinet of Souls	Universal	Film	
2014	Scooby-Doo! WrestleMania Mystery	Warner Bros.	Film	
2013	POV	PBS	Television	
2013	Sesame Street	PBS	Television	
2013	Mindless Behavior: All Around the World	AMC	Film	
2012	Swimming In Air	The Weinstein Company	Film	
2010	Spy Hunter	Warner Bros.	Game	
2010	The Shrine	IFC Films	Film	
2009	Stan Helsing	Anchor Bay	Film	
2009	Cabin Fever 2: Spring Fever	Lionsgate	Film	
2009	Offspring	Lionsgate	Film	
2008	Lower Learning	Starz	Film	
2008	Made for Each Other	IFC Films	Film	
2007	Home Movie	Anchor Bay	Film	
2007	Numb	Sony	Film	
2007	Jack Brooks: Monster Slayer	Anchor Bay	Film	
2007	The Girl Next Door	Anchor Bay	Film	
2006	Kettle of Fish	Universal	Film	
2005	Prime	Universal	Film	
2004	Call Me: The Rise and Fall of Heidi Fleiss	20th Century Fox	Film	
2003	Coney Island Baby	Sundance	Film	
2001	Harvard Man	Lionsgate	Film	
2001	Lift	Sundance	Film	
2000	Vulgar	Lionsgate	Film	

== Discography ==
Year	Title	Label	Ref.
2023	Trick or Treat Scooby-Doo!	Gardener Recordings	
2023	R.L. Stine's ZombieTown	MovieScore Media	
2022	Love in the Villa	Netflix Music	
2019	The Curse of Buckout Road	Ryan Shore Records	
2017	Tiny Christmas	Varèse Sarabande	
2017	Cop and a Half: New Recruit	Back Lot Music	
2017	Julie's Greenroom	Varèse Sarabande	
2016	Scooby-Doo! and WWE: Curse of the Speed Demon	Lakeshore Records	
2016	Floyd Norman: An Animated Life	Ryan Shore Records	
2015	R.L. Stine's Monsterville: Cabinet of Souls	Back Lot Music	
2014	Drew: The Man Behind the Poster	Ryan Shore Records	
2012	Spy Hunter	WaterTower Music	
2011	The Shrine	Screamworks	
2010	Confession	La-La Land Records	
2010	Offspring	Ryan Shore Records	
2010	Vulgar	OCF Records	
2010	Rising Stars	Doberman Entertainment	
2009	Rex Steele: Nazi Smasher and Other Short Film Scores by Ryan Shore	MovieScore Media	
2009	Shadows	MovieScore Media	
2008	Jack Brooks: Monster Slayer: Special Surround Edition	MovieScore Media	
2008	Jack Brooks: Monster Slayer	MovieScore Media	
2008	Numb/Kettle of Fish/Coney Island Baby	MovieScore Media	
2007	The Girl Next Door	MovieScore Media	
2006	Headspace	MovieScore Media	
2005	Prime	Varèse Sarabande	
