= Arcadia (TV series) =

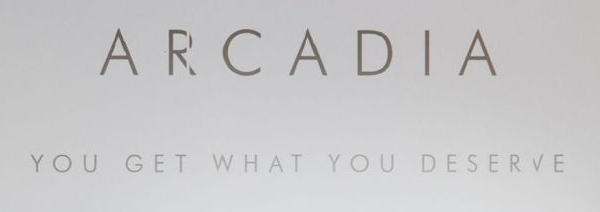
- Arcadia - Je krijgt wat je verdient
- Genre: Science fiction, post-apocalyptic fiction, near future in fiction, drama
- Created by: Philippe De Schepper
- Written by: Philippe De Schepper, Bas Adriaensen, Zita Theunynck
- Directed by: Tim Oliehoek
- Composers: Bart Demey, Tania Gallagher
- Countries of origin: Belgium; Netherlands; Germany; France
- Original language: Dutch
- No. of seasons: 2
- No. of episodes: 16

Production
- Producer: Helen Perquy
- Production locations: Belgium; Netherlands
- Cinematography: Martijn Cousijn
- Editor: Mathieu Depuydt
- Production company: Jonnydepony
- Budget: 8 million euro

Original release
- Network: VRT (Eén), NPO 3 (KRO-NCRV)
- Release: 19 March 2023 – present

Arcadia is a Belgian-Dutch science fiction television series. After a catastrophic deluge, Flemish and Dutch people are living seemingly peacefully together in the utopian society called Arcadia, until corruption surfaces. The series is claimed to be the most expensive television project ever in the Low Countries.

== Story ==
In a dystopian world, every resident of Arcadia is monitored via an implanted chip by the security agencies het Schild (English: the Shield) and het Vizier (English: the Oversight), making crime seem impossible. The nation of Arcadia is governed by the Lords of the Dome with the Guardian at its head. Faithful Arcadians can build a better future by earning citizen points.

When citizen score fraud is discovered in the family Hendriks, father Pieter is immediately banished to the perilous Outer World. His wife and four daughters are fined with penalty points on their citizen scores, causing their idyllic lives in Arcadia to fall apart and family relationships to suffer.

Regulator Simons of the Shield persists to investigate the family over the fraud. Revisor Harms of the Oversight pressures the family to help with her investigation into the resistance group de Ontrouwen (English: The Unfaithful) and a past terrorist attack on the Dome. The Unfaithful conduct their own investigation into the attack.

== Cast and characters ==
- Gene Bervoets as Pieter Hendriks, director of the Algorithm Service at Arcadia and grandson of the system's founder. He cheated with the algorithm of his daughters' citizen scores to give them a comfortable life but got caught and banned from the nation.
- Monic Hendrickx as Cato Christiaans, a widow remarried to widower Pieter Hendriks. She tries to keep the family together after Pieter gets banned.
- Abigail Abraham as Milly Hendriks, eldest daughter of Pieter Hendriks and police soldier at the Shield. About to be promoted to first lieutenant, she is demoted to corporal because of her father's crime. She wants to find her father so she can help him to survive in the Outer World.
- Lynn Van Royen as Luz Hendriks, second daughter of Pieter Hendriks. She is autistic and has difficulties to settle into her new life world after her dad is gone.
- Melody Klaver as Alex Jans, eldest daughter of Cato Christiaans and police cadet at the Shield. She's mad at her family that she got punished for the fraud while innocent.
- Ellie de Lange as Hanna Jans, second daughter of Cato Christiaans and a nurse. She's frustrated that she cannot help some people in the hospital because their citizen score is too low.
- Maarten Heijmans as Marco Simons, regulator at the Shield. As a kind of criminal invstigator, he doesn't believe that Pieter Hendriks was the only one who knew of the score fraud so keeps on investigating the family.
- Natali Broods as Lena Harms, revisor at the Oversight. She manipulates the bad situation of the family in order to convince Alex to spy on Jaak Philips, the father of her fiancée Gloria. Harms suspects Jaak Philips being a traitor and a terrorist.
- Wim Opbrouck as Jaak Philips, director of the chip company and a Lord of the Dome in Arcadia. He's is not afraid to oppose the Guardian.

== Episodes ==
Original air dates were simultaneous in Belgium and The Netherlands.

No.	Title	Directed by	Written by	Original release date
1	"Pieter's fraud does not go unpunished"	Tim Oliehoek	Philippe De Schepper, Bas Adriaensen, Zita Theunynck	March 19, 2023
(Original Dutch title: De fraude van Pieter blijft niet ongestraft) Regulator Marco Simons of the security agency the Shield arrests Pieter Hendriks and his whole family for citizen score fraud. Pieter admits guilt and gets quickly banned from the nation of Arcadia. His family, wife Cato, daughters Milly and Luz, stepdaughters Alex and Hanna are all punished with a lower citizen score. Pieter gets assaulted in the Outer World.
2	"Alex is being pressured"	Tim Oliehoek	Philippe De Schepper, Bas Adriaensen, Zita Theunynck	March 26, 2023
(Original Dutch title: Alex wordt onder druk gezet) The family must move from their beautiful bungalow to a small apartment. Milly got demoted from lieutenant to corporal in the army department of the Shield, Hanna is degraded from doctor to nurse in the hospital and Alex is not allowed to marry anymore because her fiancée Gloria has a much higher citizen score. Milly takes a task at an outer post of Arcadia in hopes to find and help her father. The hospital wants Hanna to help a boy with a low citizen score through an unauthorized botscan but she gets caught by head nurse Nora. Luz cannot handle the changes in her life and gets panic attacks. Regulator Simons thinks the family is not punished enough because he believes they all knew of their fathers fraud. He convinces Alex to betray her family. During a family gathering outside she tapes the whole conversation.
3	"Milly continues to search for her father"	Tim Oliehoek	Philippe De Schepper, Bas Adriaensen, Zita Theunynck	April 2, 2023
(Original Dutch title: Milly zoekt verder naar haar vader) Milly discovers the tape and destroys it. The family is shocked about the treason of Alex. Jaak Philips wants to help Alex, the fiancée of his daughter Gloria, with her citizen score by giving her a job in his chip factory but she declines. Bugging the apartment of the family, the Shield learns about the tape and calls Alex in for questioning. Revisor Lena Harms of the Oversight has her own plans with Alex and orders regulator Simons to stop pursuing her. Revisor Harms asks Alex to take the job in the chip factory. Luz gets arrested for making trouble on the bus to work. At the Shield office regulator Simons is pushing her to betray her family. In the hospital Hanna sees head nurse Nora stealing medicine. They go to meet her friend Cas Wessels who needs those, but they are spied upon by their colleague Willem Dieters for the Shield. In the Outer World sergeant Rein takes Milly to a settlement of refugees who might help her to find her father.
4	"Hanna gets herself deeper into the resistance"	Tim Oliehoek	Philippe De Schepper, Bas Adriaensen, Zita Theunynck	April 9, 2023
(Original Dutch title: Hanna nestelt zich dieper in het verzet) Milly asks Dax, the leader of the settlement, to help her find her father. Sergeant Rein helps the settlement with supplies in exchange for their care of Nobel, a boy with autism and the son of his deceased girlfriend. The Shield is after Nora but she commits suicide. Hanna in her place helps Cas arranging his illegal kidney transplant. Regulator Simons crackdowns a colleague of Luz for constantly harassing her. Luz visits Simons at his office to thank him, but he sends her away. At the family's flat, Simons tells mother Cato that he knows about the recording. He expresses his displeasure of their fraud. Manipulating Cato's chip results, auditor Harms pressures Alex to take the job at Jaaks factory.
5	"The resistance tests whether Hanna can be trusted"	Tim Oliehoek	Philippe De Schepper, Bas Adriaensen, Zita Theunynck	April 16, 2023
(Original Dutch title: Het verzet test of Hanna te vertrouwen is)
6	"Is Hanna falling into a trap?"	Tim Oliehoek	Philippe De Schepper, Bas Adriaensen, Zita Theunynck	April 23, 2023
(Original Dutch title: Loopt Hanna in een val?)
7	"Alex takes on the confrontation"	Tim Oliehoek	Philippe De Schepper, Bas Adriaensen, Zita Theunynck	April 30, 2023
(Original Dutch title: Alex gaat de confrontatie aan)
8	"Hugo wants revenge"	Tim Oliehoek	Philippe De Schepper, Bas Adriaensen, Zita Theunynck	May 7, 2023
(Original Dutch title: Hugo wil wraak)

== Production ==
=== Financing ===
The fiction drama series Arcadia is a project of the Belgian production house Jonnydepony, specifically by screenwriter Philippe De Schepper and producer Helen Perquy. Production began in early 2019. Perquy found production partners in the Dutch production house Big Blue and in the public broadcasters VRT from Belgium and NPO 3 (KRO-NCRV) from the Netherlands. Further support came from the German public broadcasters WDR and SWR (ARD) and the Flemish Audiovisual Fund (VAF). Each episode was provided with a budget of 1 million euros.

There were other interested co-financiers, but their demands were insurmountable for Perquy. For example, Netflix requested global broadcasting rights and the French public broadcaster wanted French actors to participate.

=== Script ===
Initially, the series was called Decimation, after the original idea of main screenwriter Philippe De Schepper to tell a story about a wretched society, caused by overpopulation, seeking refuge in inhuman solutions.

De Schepper and his co-screenwriter Bas Adriaensen found inspiration in the Chinese social credit system, a point system for privileges to for example travel abroad, and the Stasi, the secret service in the former German Democratic Republic (GDR), which recruited plenty of its own citizens to spy on their neighbors, friends and family. Those elements combined, the main story became a controlled society where a trade-off system determines your social status. With input from other screenwriters, that society was named Arcadia and the story was focused around one family who face unpleasant times when it is discovered that they cheated in the trade-off system.

=== Decor ===
A 1980s retro-futuristic background style was chosen for the future setting rather than a world full of high-tech gadgets. A large set was built in the LITES studios in Vilvoorde, including the headquarters of the Shield and also shot at existing buildings with architectural brutalism, characterized by their block-like concrete structures. Visual effects on the buildings were used for such as adding additional floors. For cars, oldtimers were used, including a purchased Bentley, which were given a futuristic look.

=== Costumes ===
To save costs, the costume department adapted flight suits for the uniforms of the security agency the Shield instead of making new uniforms.

=== Filming ===
The six-month shooting period was during the corona pandemic, which caused a lot of logistical problems. It was unauthorized to use many extras, but that helped to create a desolate atmosphere in the world of Arcadia.

Indoor shooting took place, for the most part, at the LITES studios in Vilvoorde and outdoor shooting in Belgium, the Netherlands, Germany and France.

=== Premiere ===
The first two episodes premiered at the Ostend Film Festival on 3 February 2023. The eight-part series were shown weekly on television channels VRT (Eén) and NPO 3 (KRO-NCRV) as from 19 March 2023. That same day, all episodes were put available on the Flemish public streaming service VRT MAX and the Dutch NPO Plus. On 17 August 2023 the first three episodes were put available on the German public streaming service ARD Mediathek and the remaining five episodes the next day. The series was aired on the German public-broadcasting television channel One on the weekend starting 18 August 2023 with three episodes airing on Friday and Saturday each and two episodes on Sunday. A second season was released on January 19, 2025.
