= The Red King (TV series) =

British crime drama television series (2024)

- Genre: Crime drama Horror
- Created by: Toby Whithouse
- Written by: Toby Whithouse
- Directed by: Daniel O'Hara; Lisa Clarke
- Starring: Anjli Mohindra; James Bamford; Lu Corfield; Rosie Sheehy; Sam Swainsbury; Maeve Courtier-Lilley; Marc Warren; Mark Lewis Jones; Adjoa Andoh
- Country of origin: United Kingdom
- Original language: English
- No. of series: 1
- No. of episodes: 6

Production
- Executive producers: Nicola Shindler; Toby Whithouse; Davina Earl; Daniel O'Hara; Philippa Collie Cousins
- Producer: Guy Hescott
- Production company: Quay Street Productions

Original release
- Network: Alibi
- Release: 24 April 2024

The Red King is a 2024 British crime drama television series consisting of six episodes, which aired on Alibi from 24 April to 29 May. It was created and written by Toby Whithouse and directed by Daniel O'Hara and Lisa Clarke.

The Red King stars Anjli Mohindra as Grace, a detective sergeant posted to the fictional island of St Jory, off the Welsh coast, as she investigates the death of a young boy. St Jory is home to the True Way, a pagan cult that was established about 100 years ago by the Nancarrow family. Locals claim the cult no longer exists but celebrate festivals for the tourist trade. Grace and police constable Owen (James Bamford) investigate the murder of a boy, Cai, despite lack of cooperation from most residents. Other characters include former sergeant Gruffudd (Mark Lewis Jones), pub owner Lowri (Lu Corfield), her daughter Winter (Maeve Courtier-Lilley), Cai's father Ian (Marc Warren) and Nancarrow descendant Heather (Adjoa Andoh).

== Premise ==
After informing on fellow police officers for assaulting an alleged rapist, Grace Narayan is posted as a sergeant to the small Welsh island of St Jory, where she begins investigating the disappearance of a local boy named Cai. Along the way, Grace uncovers local secrets and suspects the involvement of a pagan cult named True Way, which the islanders claim no longer exists.

== Cast and characters ==
- Grace Narayan (Anjli Mohindra): Detective Sergeant replaces Gruffudd at St Jory's police station. She had reported her former boyfriend DC Cooper and another officer for grievously assaulting an alleged rapist.
- Owen Parry (James Bamford): police constable, Elan's husband, Owen junior's father
- Lowri Bain (Lu Corfield): pub owner, Grace's landlady, Winter's mother. True Way adherent
- Winter Bain (Maeve Courtier-Lilley): Lowri's daughter, Cai's friend, begins idolising Grace
- Gruffudd Prosser (Mark Lewis Jones): retired Detective Sergeant, father of Bethan, who left for the mainland two years earlier
- Minh Prosser (Tuyen Do): Gruffudd's second wife, married about two years earlier
- Father Douglas Carrisford (Sam Swainsbury): St Jory's Church priest, arrived five years earlier
- Lady Heather Nancarrow (Adjoa Andoh): St Jory's main business and landowner, claims True Way no longer exists
- Dr Ian Prideaux (Marc Warren): local general practitioner, town drunk, Cai's father. Had an affair with Lucy before Cai disappeared a year earlier.
- Mihangel Pugh (Oliver Ryan): farmer
- Elan Parry (Rosie Sheehy): Owen's wife, Owen junior's mother
- Alun Crowther (Dylan Jones) and Eric Cowther (Lloyd Meredith): twin brothers, mortician's assistants, boorish bullies
- Lucy Popkin (Lauren Morais): Cai's former babysitter, had an affair with Ian, Silas' girlfriend, Bethan's friend
- Silas Bennion (Aled ap Steffan): Lucy's boyfriend, conspiracy theorist, fears True Way
- Leslie Crowther (Jim Kitson): local mortician, Gruffudd's friend, father of Alun and Eric
- Dylan Onion (Wayne Cater): fisherman
- Matt Benfield (Connor Calland): uniformed policeman, former True Way adherent
- Ann Fletcher (Jill Halfpenny): DCI homicide investigator, leads the investigation into Cai's death

== Production ==
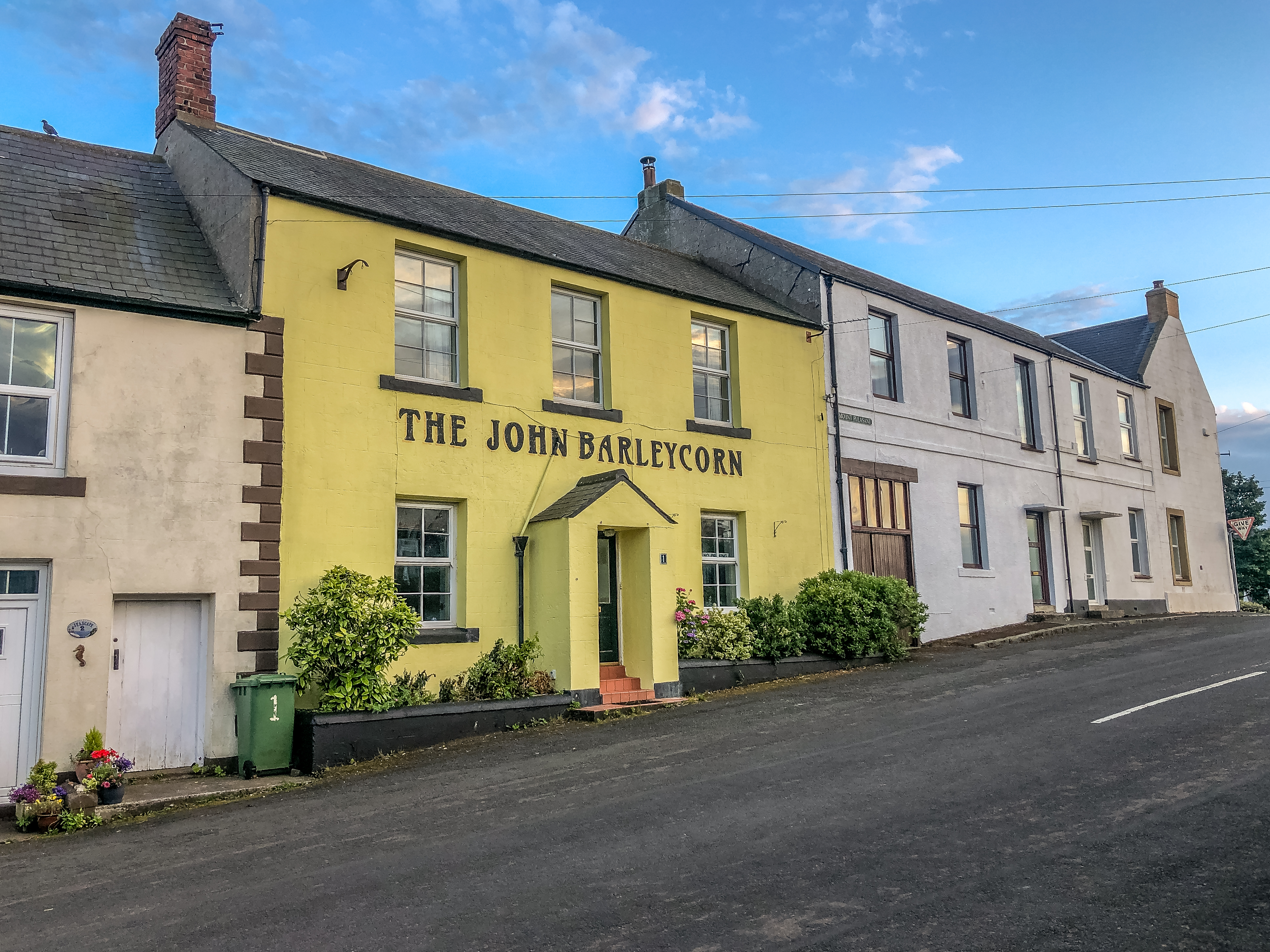
House in Embleton painted as the John Barleycorn pub

The Red King is written by Toby Whithouse and directed by Daniel O'Hara and Lisa Clarke. The executive producers are Nicola Shindler and Davina Earl for Quay Street Productions, Philippa Collie Cousins for UKTV and writer Whithouse and director Daniel O’Hara. The series is produced by Guy Hescott.

The cast includes Anjli Mohindra, Adjoa Andoh, Marc Warren and Jill Halfpenny, as well as Mark Lewis Jones, Oliver Ryan, Sam Swainsbury, Lu Corfield, James Bamford and Maeve Courtier-Lilley.

The story is set on the fictitious St Jory island off the Welsh coast, but was filmed in Northumberland, and had begun by 19 June 2023. Filming locations included Embleton, Craster, Alnmouth, and Cambois. The Morris dancers featured in the series were from Black Gate Morris.

== Broadcast ==
The series premiered in the United Kingdom on Alibi on 24 April 2024.

== Reviews ==
The Guardian gave it four out of five stars, comparing it favourably with The Wicker Man. They said "The Red King applies entertaining topspin to the road-tested premise, adding yet more rug-pulls and buckets of sarcasm and self-reflexiveness." Carol Midgley in The Times praised the "dry, dark wit" of Whithouse’s script, and said the cast is "high pedigree". Keith Watson in The Daily Telegraph awarded the series four stars out of five and praised the performance of Mohindra who "hits just the right note".

== Episode guide ==
No.	Title	Directed by	Written by	Original release date
1	"Episode 1"	Daniel O'Hara	Toby Whithouse	24 April 2024
Shunned by her colleagues for reporting on fellow police officers, Grace Narayan is assigned to a post on the Welsh island of St Jory. She learns about the island’s residents and history, including the True Way cult. Grace begins investigating the disappearance of a boy named Cai, who went missing a year prior, and eventually finds a corpse that might be his.
2	"Episode 2"	Daniel O'Hara	Toby Whithouse	1 May 2024
Police launch an investigation into the boy’s death, led by investigator Ann Fletcher. Police confirm the dead boy was Cai, and his death is ruled as accidental. While grappling with her past, Grace is warned to overlook the residents’ increasingly strange and threatening behavior.
3	"Episode 3"	Daniel O'Hara	Toby Whithouse	8 May 2024
Police learn that three residents, Gruffud, Elan, and Lowri, are missing from last year’s annual village hall photo. Grace grows increasingly suspicious that True Way was involved in Cai’s death. Residents’ secrets are revealed, including an affair between Ian and Lucy, which began when Lucy was 17. Grace arrests Ian for assaulting Silas.
4	"Episode 4"	Daniel O'Hara	Toby Whithouse	15 May 2024
Grace insists that True Way was involved in Cai’s death, but Heather and Douglas disagree. Mihangel commits suicide, and Elan and Lucy find Mihangel’s defiled corpse in the village hall. The residents of St Jory blame True Way for the desecration of Mihangel’s corpse.
5	"Episode 5"	Daniel O'Hara	Toby Whithouse	22 May 2024
Police access Bethan’s laptop and learn that Cai helped Bethan leave St Jory. Gruffudd claims that he was at Lowri’s pub when last year’s annual photo was taken, and Lowri confirms his alibi. Grace views CCTV footage from last year and sees Douglas stabbing Gruffudd. Grace arrests Douglas and is confronted by the islanders, who want to punish Douglas on their own.
6	"Episode 6"	Daniel O'Hara	Toby Whithouse	29 May 2024
True Way adherents seize Douglas and put him on trial at the village hall, with Heather presiding over the trial and Grace defending Douglas. Heather rules that Douglas should be executed, citing his sexual abuse of a child. Grace orders Owen to arrest Douglas, and the True Way adherents surrender themselves to the police, except Heather, who is killed in a murder-suicide by Cai's father. It is revealed that True Way killed Cai as a sacrifice to their deities and infiltrated the police force to hinder the investigation. Six months later, Grace is offered a permanent position on St Jory.
