= Monsterville: Cabinet of Souls =

- iTunes film poster
- Directed by: Peter DeLuise
- Written by: Billy Brown; Dan Angel
- Produced by: Dan Angel; Billy Brown
- Starring: Dove Cameron; Katherine McNamara; Braeden Lemasters; Tiffany Espensen; Ryan McCartan
- Cinematography: James Menard
- Edited by: Lisa Jane Robison
- Music by: Ryan Shore
- Production companies: Universal 1440 Entertainment; Everywhere Studios
- Distributed by: Universal Pictures Home Entertainment
- Release date: September 29, 2015 (United States)
- Running time: 88 minutes
- Country: United States
- Language: English

Monsterville: Cabinet of Souls is a 2015 American comedy horror film based on the 2012 novel of the same name by R. L. Stine. It is directed by Peter DeLuise, written and produced by Dan Angel and Billy Brown, and executive produced by Stine. It stars Dove Cameron, Katherine McNamara, Braeden Lemasters, Tiffany Espensen and Ryan McCartan.

== Plot ==
A small town Halloween festival finds itself intruded upon by an evil carnival with designs upon imprisoning and feeding off the souls of missing teenagers. Targeted are four high school friends, Beth, Kellen, Nicole and Luke. Beth notices a new kid named Hunter and falls for him. Kellen then meets Lilith (who works at the carnival known as Dr. Hysteria's Hall of Horrors) and starts to fall for her too.

Beth notices that Dr. Hysteria's carnival is odd and that her friends have started to act on their more negative traits. This results in Luke turning into a clown and Nicole into a witch. Kellen is later led by Lilith to a movie theater hidden in Dr. Hysteria's attraction, which shows the viewer what they dream or desire most; in his case this would be winning Beth's affection from Hunter. This, however, is what Dr. Hysteria uses to capture new victims to use as monsters in his carnival and to feed on their souls as sustenance because he is an evil demon. Beth is later led to the theater, but is unaffected by what she sees, as she chooses her friends over Hunter; she then learns Hunter and Lilith are Dr. Hysteria's children. They want Beth to join them as her strength is what they seek in family, but Beth sprays them with a bottle of exorcism materials, paralyzing them. This frees Kellen, their friends and another recent victim. Dr. Hysteria, his children, and his carnival are then sucked through a portal and disappear.

Kellen then finally works up his courage and kisses Beth, to which she tells him that it was about time. The film ends with the Cabinet opening with a white light.

== Cast ==
- Dove Cameron as Beth
- Braeden Lemasters as Kellen
- Katherine McNamara as Lilith/Lily
- Casey Dubois as Luke
- Tiffany Espensen as Nicole
- Ryan McCartan as Hunter
- Landry Bender as Leah
- Andrew Kavadas as Dr. Hysteria
- David Lewis as Mayor
- Keith MacKechnie as Sheriff
- Laine MacNeil as Andrea Payton
- Ash Taylor as Adam Penton, the guitarist of Wheels
- Karin Konoval as Ms. Sarkosian
- Fiona Vroom as Nora

== Music ==
The film's original score was composed by Ryan Shore.

== Release ==
The film was released on DVD and digital platforms on September 29, 2015.

== See also ==
- List of films set around Halloween
