= Run Away (TV series) =

Netflix television series

- Release poster
- Also known as: Harlan Coben's Run Away
- Genre: Thriller
- Based on: Run Away by Harlan Coben
- Developed by: Danny Brocklehurst
- Directed by: Nimer Rashed; Isher Sahota
- Starring: James Nesbitt; Alfred Enoch; Ruth Jones; Minnie Driver; Ellie de Lange; Ingrid Oliver; Amy Gledhill; Jon Pointing; Maeve Courtier-Lilley; Adrian Greensmith; Sam Swainsbury; Annette Badland; Tracy-Ann Oberman; Ellie Henry
- Composers: Luke Richards; David Buckley
- Country of origin: United Kingdom
- Original language: English
- No. of series: 1
- No. of episodes: 8

Production
- Executive producers: Harlan Coben; Danny Brocklehurst; Nicola Shindler; Richard Fee; Nimer Rashed
- Producers: Guy Hescott; Will McDonagh
- Editor: David Fisher
- Running time: 41–50 minutes
- Production companies: Final Twist Productions; Quay Street Productions

Original release
- Network: Netflix
- Release: 1 January 2026

Run Away (also known as Harlan Coben's Run Away) is a British television miniseries made for streaming service Netflix, adapted from a novel by Harlan Coben. The series premiered on 1 January 2026 and it stars James Nesbitt, Alfred Enoch, Ruth Jones, Minnie Driver, and Ellie de Lange.

== Premise ==
The drama follows investment banker Simon Greene (James Nesbitt), as he frantically searches for his runaway, drug-addicted daughter, Paige (Ellie de Lange). His investigation plunges him into a dangerous underworld, where dark secrets and violent truths threaten to shatter his seemingly perfect life.

== Cast ==
=== Main ===
- James Nesbitt as Simon Greene, an investment banker searching for his runaway daughter, Paige, after becoming a suspect in the murder of Paige's abusive and drug-dealing boyfriend, Aaron Corval.
- Alfred Enoch as DS Isaac Fagbenle, the Detective Sergeant investigating Aaron Corval's murder who strongly suspects Simon's involvement.
- Ruth Jones as Elena Ravenscroft, a well-respected private investigator with a new case.
- Minnie Driver as Dr. Ingrid Greene, a pediatric doctor and Simon's wife. She is Paige, Sam, and Anya's mother, and she risks her own safety to find her missing daughter after Simon is accused of Aaron's murder.
- Ellie de Lange as Paige Greene, Simon and Ingrid's drug-addicted daughter who ran away with her boyfriend Aaron six months before the start of the series.
- Ingrid Oliver as Yvonne Previdi, Simon's business partner and Ingrid's sister.
- Amy Gledhill as DC Ruby Todd, the Detective Constable assisting DS Fagbenle on the case.
- Jon Pointing as Ashley "Ash" Davis, Dee Dee's loyal foster brother and a hit man.
- Maeve Courtier-Lilley as Dee Dee "Holly" Lahoy, a young woman who grew up in foster care and is now devoted to The Beacon of the Shining Truth.
- Adrian Greensmith as Sam Greene, Simon and Ingrid's son who is studying at university.
- Sam Swainsbury as Professor Van De Beek, a professor at Paige's university that she met with regularly before dropping out.
- Annette Badland as Lou, a tech expert and the mother of Elena's deceased husband.
- Tracy-Ann Oberman as Jessica Kinberg, Simon's attorney.
- Ellie Henry as Anya Greene, Simon and Ingrid's teenage daughter who uses a wheelchair.

=== Recurring ===
- Mark Bazeley as Dr. Jay Stanfield, Ingrid's coworker, a pediatric surgeon.
- Lucian Msamati as Cornelius Faber, Paige and Aaron's neighbor who is very protective of Paige.
- Geraldine James as Mother Adiona, a high-ranking member of The Beacon of the Shining Truth, a powerful religious cult.
- Marcus Fraser as Rocco, Paige's dealer who operates in the basement of her apartment complex.
- Thomas Flynn as Aaron Corval, Paige's abusive boyfriend who works for Rocco.
- Ken Bones as Casper Vartage, the leader of The Beacon of the Shining Truth. He is referred to as "The One" by his followers.
- Connor Porter as Luther, a violent member of Rocco's gang.
- Simon Thorp as Sebastian Thorpe, Elena's newest client who hires her to find his missing son, Henry.
- Finty Williams as Enid Corval, Aaron's step-mother.
- Joe McGann as Wiley Corval, Aaron's father.
- Clara Lioe as Katie, Paige's college roommate.
- Chenée Taylor as Judy, Paige's college roommate.

== Episodes ==
No.	Title	Directed by	Written by	Original release date
1	"Seeing Is Believing"	Nimer Rashed	Danny Brocklehurst	1 January 2026
Paige Greene has been missing for six months when her father, Simon, finds her in a park, under the influence of drugs. Simon’s attempt to take Paige home results in a physical confrontation with her boyfriend, Aaron, who is later found dead, with Simon a suspect. Elena, a private investigator, is tasked by Sebastian Thorpe to find his missing son, Henry. Meanwhile, a woman named DeeDee and her companion, Ash, go on a killing spree. Simon and his wife, Ingrid, decide they need to search for Paige. Paige’s neighbour Cornelius helps them understand her last known movements and then advised them to meet with her dealer, Rocco. During the meeting, another dealer named Luther panics and shoots Ingrid. Cornelius shoots Luther in the shoulder, and Ingrid is left in a coma.
2	"Tattoos While U Wait"	Nimer Rashed	Tom Farrelly	1 January 2026
Ash and DeeDee’s killing spree escalates with the murders of Damien and a random bystander. Subsequently, private investigator Elena Ravenscroft uncovers a connection between the disappearance of Henry and the murder of Damien. Meanwhile, police question Simon about the shootings of Ingrid and Luther. Simon maintains that he does not know who shot Luther. Simon's search for Paige continues, and, upon speaking with Cornelius, learns that a woman has been inside Paige and Aaron's apartment. Cornelius and Simon go there to search for Paige, but instead run into Elena.
3	"Breaking Point"	Nimer Rashed	Amanda Duke	1 January 2026
Simon continues searching for Paige and learns that she secretly visited Sam at his university before suddenly disappearing again. Police investigate the murder of Aaron and begin to suspect that someone close to him may have been involved. Elena pursues a lead involving Damien who was recently murdered and may have been connected to Aaron and Paige. Simon attends Aaron’s funeral hoping Paige will appear, but gains little information from Aaron’s family. As Simon digs deeper, he discovers that Paige may have been the one who initiated contact with Aaron. The episode ends with Simon searching Aaron’s caravan and finding the jacket Paige was wearing the last time she was seen.
4	"A Different Time"	Isher Sahota	Charlotte Coben	1 January 2026
Simon investigates Paige’s life at university and learns from her roommate Katie that Paige had been pursuing Aaron and began changing after meeting him. He also discovers that Paige joined a biology group called the Family Tree Club run by Professor Liam van de Beek and may have grown close to him. Simon questions if Paige is his biological daughter. Meanwhile, detectives investigate Ingrid's relationship with Dr. Stanfield while also trying to determine who killed Aaron. Elena uncovers connections between several adopted people, including Aaron and Damien, suggesting a deeper link between the cases. Ash and DeeDee confront their abusive foster mother and kill her before burying the body.
5	"Forever Be the Shining Truth"	Isher Sahota	Charlotte Coben	1 January 2026
A flashback shows DeeDee working for a cult called The Shining Truth, whose leader assigns her and Ash a series of killings in exchange for money. In the present, Ash begins to question the cult while DeeDee remains loyal and determined to complete the assignments. Simon and Elena continue their investigation, and discover that Aaron, Damien, and others may be connected through adoption records and DNA ancestry databases.
6	"The Man I Knew"	Isher Sahota	Tom Farrelly	1 January 2026
Simon confronts Professor van de Beek about Paige and learns that she had been drugged and raped at a party, which pushed her into drug addiction. He begins to suspect that Doug may have been responsible and that Aaron later attacked Doug to defend Paige. Meanwhile, Elena discovers that Aaron, Damien, and others were adopted and share DNA, revealing them to be half-brothers. Ash and DeeDee continue working for the Shining Truth cult, but Ash secretly struggles with the orders he has been given. Cornelius later tells Simon that he saw Paige leaving Aaron’s apartment the night Aaron died. At the same time, DeeDee lures Elena to a remote cottage where Ash holds her at gunpoint.
7	"Sliding Doors"	Nimer Rashed	Danny Brocklehurst	1 January 2026
A flashback showing Mother Adiona secretly overhearing DeeDee receive a kill list from The Shining Truth and unsuccessfully trying to warn one target, Nathan. Simon and Lou are suspicious of strange texts from Elena’s phone and report her missing. After retracing Elena's last known movements, police begin to suspect that she walked into a trap. Detectives also discover that Henry had been in contact with his biological mother, Victoria, who was formerly a member of The Shining Truth. Ash, increasingly wary, confronts DeeDee about the cult, who admits their killings serve the cult’s plan to eliminate the One’s illegitimate children. Later, at Rocco’s place, Ash and DeeDee ambush Simon and Cornelius, triggering a chaotic shootout in which Rocco, Luther, and Ash are killed. DeeDee pursues Simon through the estate, shooting him in the back, but is shoved to her death by Mother Adiona. Simon survives, and is taken to the hospital by an ambulance.
8	"It Stays with Us"	Nimer Rashed	Danny Brocklehurst	1 January 2026
Simon visits Ingrid's hospital room, where he finds Paige sitting next to her comatose mother. Paige tells him that she was in rehab and must return there to complete her program. Ingrid emerges from her coma and the family reunites with Paige. Police discover Elena's body. Later, Ingrid confesses to Simon that she killed Aaron to protect Paige from his abuse. While fleeing the murder scene, Ingrid was spotted by Luther, who later shot her out of fear of being next. Simon remains dissatisfied, feeling that part of the puzzle remains uncovered. After sifting through Ingrid's old photos, Simon discovers that Ingrid had once been a member of The Shining Truth, and that she had become pregnant while living in Italy. Simon confronts Paige, who confirms his suspicion that Aaron was her biological half-brother by Ingrid. After finding Aaron through a family ancestry website, Paige formed a platonic relationship with him. When she was drugged and raped by Doug Mulzer, Aaron beat him in revenge. Under the pretense of helping her cope with the trauma, Aaron introduced Paige to drugs. In reality, Aaron's true motive was to turn Paige into an addict so that she wouldn't leave him. Paige convinces Simon not to tell Ingrid that she actually killed her own son. Simon agrees to that and the whole family has a happy meal. But the undercurrent is dark as Simon clearly suspects there are more secrets about Ingrid to be revealed.

== Production ==
Netflix said in January 2024, it would be adapting Run Away by Harlan Coben with Coben as executive producer on the series.

A full cast list announced on 21 January 2025 showed James Nesbitt and Alfred Enoch leading the cast alongside Ruth Jones, Minnie Driver, Ellie de Lange, Ingrid Oliver, Amy Gledhill, Jon Pointing, and Maeve Courtier-Lilley.

Filming started in England in January 2025. Locations included Saddleworth Moor and Greater Manchester, as well as Liverpool. The exterior of the depicted Lanford University is the former S. Katharine's College building, now part of Liverpool Hope University and this is edited together with scenes in the University of Manchester Old Quadrangle.

== Music ==
The score for the first two episodes was composed by David Buckley and Luke Richards, with Luke Richards receiving sole composer credit for the remaining six episodes.

== Release ==
The eight-part series was released on 1 January 2026.

== Reception ==
The review aggregator website Rotten Tomatoes reported an 82% approval rating based on 28 critic reviews. The website's critics consensus reads, "A sturdy adaptation from the Harlan Coben canon, Run Away sprints through a series of twists while never losing steam thanks to James Nesbitt's committed performance." Metacritic, which uses a weighted average, gave a score of 56 out of 100 based on 8 critics, indicating "mixed or average".

For her role in the series Ruth Jones was nominated in the Drama Performance category at the 31st National Television Awards.
