= Fortitude (2026 film) =

- Directed by: Simon West
- Written by: Simon Afram
- Produced by: Simon Afram; Georgette Turner; Reza Roohi; Edward Kahl
- Starring: Nicolas Cage; Matthew Goode; Ed Skrein; Alice Eve; Michael Sheen; Ben Kingsley
- Cinematography: Alan Caudillo
- Edited by: Glen Scantlebury
- Music by: Simon Afram
- Production company: Op-Fortitude
- Release date: 2026
- Country: United Kingdom
- Language: English

Fortitude is an upcoming British historical spy action-adventure film directed by Simon West and written by Simon Afram. It stars Nicolas Cage, Matthew Goode, Ed Skrein, Alice Eve, Michael Sheen, and Ben Kingsley.

== Premise ==
The true story of British Intelligence operatives using unprecedented strategic operations that fool Nazi leadership, ultimately changing the course of World War II. The film follows the brilliance of British Army officers Dudley Clarke and Thomas Argyll "Tar" Robertson, who deployed an elaborate web of deception campaigns, including fictitious armies, fake military equipment, and a network of double agents to mislead Nazi Intelligence.

== Cast ==
- Nicolas Cage as Duško Popov
- Matthew Goode as Thomas Argyll Robertson
- Ed Skrein as Dudley Clarke
- Alice Eve as Nancy Armstrong
- Michael Sheen as Winston Churchill
- Ben Kingsley
- Jordi Mollà as Juan Pujol García
- Art Malik as Ian Fleming
- Lukas Haas
- Adrian Topol
- Emilio Sakraya
- Akar Faraj
- Paul Anderson as Bernard Montgomery
- Ron Perlman as George S. Patton
- Ronni Ancona
- Lorena Andrea
- Maeve Courtier-Lilley
- Freddy Carter
- Jonathan Aris
- Andrew P. Stephen
- Daniel Philpott as Adolf Hitler

== Production ==
In May 2025, Simon West had been hired to direct an historical espionage action-adventure film set in World War II, with Simon Afram writing the script and also producing.

Principal photography began on September 8, 2025, in London, when Nicolas Cage, Matthew Goode, Ed Skrein, Alice Eve, Michael Sheen, Ben Kingsley, Jordi Mollà, Art Malik, Lukas Haas, Adrian Topol, Emilio Sakraya, Paul Anderson, Ronni Ancona, Lorena Andrea, Maeve Courtier-Lilley, Freddy Carter, and Jonathan Aris rounded out the ensemble cast. Filming wrapped on October 26.

=== Theft and lawsuit ===
In June 2026, a hard drive containing an unencrypted master copy of the film was stolen from Netflix's offices in Los Angeles. The theft has sparked a lawsuit from Afram against Netflix for $105 million, accusing them of compromising the sale of the film and jeopardizing its planned release strategy and awards campaign. In a statement, Afram said, "I spent seven years of my life bringing this incredible true story to the screen ... But this film was never mine alone. It belongs to the extraordinary cast and their performances of a lifetime that deserve to be seen and recognized. It represents the moment these artists have earned".

== Release ==
Fortitude is scheduled to be released theatrically in 2026.
