= Veselka: The Rainbow on the Corner at the Center of the World =

2024 documentary film

- Directed by: Michael Fiore
- Written by: Michael Fiore
- Produced by: Michael Fiore
- Narrated by: David Duchovny
- Cinematography: Bill Winters
- Edited by: Michael Fiore
- Music by: Ryan Shore
- Production company: Fiore Media Group
- Distributed by: Fiore Media Group
- Release date: February 23, 2024
- Running time: 106 minutes
- Country: United States
- Language: English

Veselka: The Rainbow on the Corner at the Center of the World is a 2024 American documentary film which details the history of Veselka, a Ukrainian restaurant in the East Village neighborhood of Manhattan in New York City and the restaurant's efforts in support of Ukraine during the Russian invasion. It is directed and written by Michael Fiore. David Duchovny narrates the film. The score was composed by Ryan Shore and features saxophone solos by David Sanborn.

== Reception ==
On the review aggregator website Rotten Tomatoes, 100% of nine critics' reviews are positive, with an average rating of 7.3/10.

Brian Tallerico of RogerEbert.com gave the film two and a half stars out of four and wrote, "Like the title that goes on a bit longer than it needs to, the filmmakers here have a habit of underlining and emphasizing elements of their story that would have been more powerful without a more subtle approach. But this is still a remarkably moving piece of work, a documentary that understands that a diner can't save your life, but that doesn't make it any less essential to it."
