= The Light in the Hall =

Welsh and English-language drama television series

- Also known as: Y Golau
- Genre: Drama
- Created by: Regina Moriarty
- Directed by: Andy Newbery, Chris Forster (series 1). Rhys Carter, Erin Richards, Sion Ifan (series 2)
- Starring: Joanna Scanlan (series 1); Iwan Rheon (series 1); Alexandra Roach (series 1); Sian Reese-Williams (series 1 & 2); Mark Lewis Jones (series 2); Nia Roberts (series 2); Robert Glenister (series 2); Maeve Courtier-Lilley (series 2)
- Country of origin: Wales
- Original languages: Welsh; English
- No. of series: 2
- No. of episodes: 12

Production
- Producer: Eryl Huw Phillips (series 1)
- Running time: 60 minutes including adverts

Original release
- Network: S4C / Channel 4
- Release: 15 May 2022 – 1 July 2026

The Light in the Hall (Welsh: Y Golau) is a British drama television series. It has both English-language and Welsh-language versions. Series one premiered on S4C on 15 May 2022, and series two (subtitled Still Waters) on 14 September 2025 (16 June 2026 on Channel 4).

== Production ==
Series one was co-produced by S4C, Channel 4, and the producers Duchess Street Productions and Triongl in association with APC Studios. The show is based in Carmarthenshire, Wales where two of the leading actors, Alexandra Roach and Iwan Rheon are from. Significant parts of series one were also filmed in the Tywi Valley, in the towns of Llandovery, Llangadog, Llandeilo and Carmarthen. Some filming also took place in Cardiff.

== Plot ==
Series 1 of the series has six episodes and is based in Llanemlyn, a town in west Wales. It follows a young journalist, Cat Donato who is played by Alexandra Roach, whose best friend Ela Roberts went missing 18 years ago. A quiet gardener named Joe Pritchard played by Iwan Rheon is arrested following a confession but he cannot explain what happened to the body.

Series 2, subtitled "Still Waters", returns to the same location but with an all-new cast apart from Caryl Huws (Siân Reese-Williams).

== Release and reception ==
Series one of The Light in the Hall was made in 2022 and premiered on S4C in Wales on 15 May 2022. This was followed by a UK-wide airing on Channel 4 in January 2023.

The Light in the Hall received positive ratings on Rotten Tomatoes. It received a rating of 71% from critics and 75% from audience.

In her review for The Guardian, Lucy Mangan stated that the series takes an hour to set the scene and is at its strongest during the interpersonal scenes, particularly the tender relationship between Sharon and Dai. Greta's refusal to join her mother's “Murderwang! Gang” is a memorable moment.

== Cast ==
=== Series 1 ===
- Sharon - Joanna Scanlan
- Joe - Iwan Rheon
- Cat - Alexandra Roach
- Ela - Ella Peel
- Greta - Annes Elwy
- Young Joe - Dylan Jones
- Dai - Morgan Hopkins
- Sali - Catherine Ayres
- Caryl - Sian Reese-Williams
- Gafyn - Aneirin Hughes
- DCI Parry - Ioan Hefin
- Young Shelley - Mari Ann Bull
- Wyn - Ifan Huw Dafydd
- Shelley - Rhian Blythe
- Rhys - Aled Bidder
- Eilis - Delyth Wyn
- Ian - Aled Pugh
- Ceri-Ann - Shelley Rees
- Izzy - Hannah Daniel
- Nina - Lisa Palfrey

=== Series 2 ===
- Caryl - Sian Reese-Williams
- Rhys - Mark Lewis Jones
- Eve - Nia Roberts
- Robert - Robert Glenister
- Mabli - Maeve Courtier-Lilley
- Llŷr - Ieuan Evans
- Young Rhys - Oliver John
- Bryn - Wyn Bowen Harries
- Hari - Tom Rhys Harries
- Gareth - Matthew Gravelle
- Megan - Mali Tudno Jones
- Young Eve - Leisa Gwenllian
- Young Bryn - Owen Arwyn
- Mrs. Lewis - Olwen Rees

== See also ==
- List of Welsh television series
