= Love, Guaranteed =

- Official release poster
- Directed by: Mark Steven Johnson
- Written by: Elizabeth Hackett; Hilary Galanoy
- Produced by: Rachael Leigh Cook; Dan Spilo; Stephanie Slack; Margret H. Huddleston
- Starring: Rachael Leigh Cook; Damon Wayans Jr.; Caitlin Howden; Jed Rees; Lisa Durupt; Sean Amsing; Brendan Taylor; Alvin Sanders; Kandyse McClure; Heather Graham
- Cinematography: José David Montero
- Edited by: Kathryn Himoff
- Music by: Ryan Shore
- Production companies: Off Camera Entertainment; Industry Entertainment
- Distributed by: Netflix
- Release date: September 3, 2020
- Running time: 91 minutes
- Country: United States
- Language: English

Love, Guaranteed is a 2020 American romantic comedy film directed by Mark Steven Johnson and written by Elizabeth Hackett and Hilary Galanoy, starring Rachael Leigh Cook and Damon Wayans Jr. It was released on Netflix on September 3, 2020.

== Plot ==
In Seattle, Susan is a mostly pro bono lawyer for Whitaker Associates who goes undercover to investigate the online dating website Love, Guaranteed. Her client Nick has had 986 dates through them with no luck finding love. The three dates she tries go decidedly wrong, and she also goes to secretly observe his 1000th date to make sure he's on the up and up.

Susan and Nick attend a meeting with founder Tamara Taylor and her lawyers, who offer $100,000 to settle out of court, which they decline in lieu of a court date six weeks later. In preparation for their court appearance, Susan and Nick meet up to discuss their case, etc. and they start to show a mutual interest. One of the other lawyers, after seeing some photos of them taken by a private investigator, call Susan to advise her that a developing relationship with Nick could be considered nullifying their argument, as their meeting was due to Love, Guaranteed.

So, Susan chooses to spend the last two weeks before the court date avoiding him, to try to turn off their feelings. The day arrives, and Susan seems to be winning the case, cleverly managing to question the defense's prime witness, Nick's ex-fiancée and supermodel, Arianna, before the defense. However, in the five-minute recess, Nick goes after Arianna to thank her, and she makes him realize that he loves Susan.

Nick returns to the courtroom, withdrawing his lawsuit on the grounds that he has fallen in love with his lawyer, who admits that she loves him too. Then they kiss passionately and make their relationship official. At the very end, Tamara Taylor offers to give them the money Nick asks for to open a pro bono physical therapy clinic in exchange for Susan and Nick being the image for Love, Guaranteed.

== Cast ==
- Rachael Leigh Cook as Susan Whitaker, a struggling attorney
- Damon Wayans Jr. as Nick Evans, Susan's well-heeled client
- Caitlin Howden as Melanie, Susan's sister
- Jed Rees as Bill Jones
- Lisa Durupt as Denise, Susan's legal assistant
- Sean Amsing as Roberto, Susan's other legal assistant
- Brendan Taylor as Gideon, Melanie's husband and Susan's brother-in-law
- Alvin Sanders as Jerome
- Kandyse McClure as Arianna, Nick's ex-fiancée from two years ago
- Heather Graham as Tamara Taylor, the CEO of a dating site known as Love, Guaranteed
- Quynh Mi as Rita Wu, the date who talked about cats all night
- Kallie Hu as Micah
- Milo Shandel as Dr. Rossmore
- Sebastian Billingsley-Rodriguez as Oliver
- Jason Burkart as Sparkletts Guy
- Claire Hesselgrave as Pam

== Production ==
The film, set in Seattle, was shot in Vancouver, British Columbia, Canada. Locations used include the Gastown neighborhood, the Vancouver Art Gallery, and Stanley Park.

Rachael Leigh Cook produced and stars in the film. The idea came from the real-life lawsuit brought against Molson Coors who claimed in their advertising that their beer was brewed using "pure Rocky Mountain spring water." The lawsuit brought by Rachel Leigh Cook's character and her client in the film revolves around the unrealistic promises made by an online dating service.

The film's original score was composed by Ryan Shore.

== Reception ==
On Rotten Tomatoes, the film has an approval rating of 56% based on reviews from 25 critics, with an average rating of 5/10. On Metacritic, the film has a weighted average score of 39 out of 100, based on 6 critics, indicating "generally unfavorable" reviews.

Lisa Kennedy of Variety wrote: "If likability is a trait you value, Love, Guaranteed delivers the undemanding pleasure of watching two fundamentally decent people tumble into fondness and then love."
