= Tom Wozniczka =

French actor

Tom Wozniczka is a French film and television actor. His television roles include Drops of God (2023–present) and Slow Horses (2024). His film roles include Champagne Problems (2025).

== Career ==
Wozniczka had his first role in the French film Les Damnes (2016). He appeared in the short films Souviens moi, Nico and Musher. In 2023, he had a role on the French television series Besoin d'amour.

From 2023, Wozniczka could be seen in international television series Drops of God as Thomas Chassangre. Wozniczka appeared as Patrice in season four of Apple TV+ espionage series Slow Horses, portraying the onscreen son of Harkness (Hugo Weaving).

Wozniczka had a leading role alongside Minka Kelly in 2025 Netflix Christmas romantic comedy Champagne Problems. The film was well-viewed, reported to have gained over 20 million views in the initial week following its release, and topping the Netflix worldwide film chart, and reaching Number 1 in 58 individual countries, including the United States, France and the United Kingdom.

== Partial filmography ==
Year	Title	Role	Notes
2023	Besoin d'amour	Kevin	
2023–present	Drops of God	Thomas Chassangre	12 episodes
2024	Slow Horses	Patrice	5 episodes
2025	Champagne Problems	Henri Cassell	Film
