= Champagne Problems (film) =

American romantic comedy film

- Release poster
- Directed by: Mark Steven Johnson
- Written by: Mark Steven Johnson
- Produced by: Stephanie Slack; Margret H. Huddleston; Mark Steven Johnson
- Starring: Minka Kelly; Tom Wozniczka; Thibault de Montalembert; Sean Amsing; Flula Borg; Astrid Whettnall; Xavier Samuel
- Cinematography: José David Montero
- Edited by: Kathryn Himoff
- Music by: Ryan Shore
- Production companies: Grumpy Entertainment; Off Camera Entertainment
- Distributed by: Netflix
- Release date: November 19, 2025
- Running time: 99 minutes
- Country: United States
- Language: English

Champagne Problems is a 2025 American romantic comedy film written and directed by Mark Steven Johnson and starring Minka Kelly and Tom Wozniczka.

Sydney, an executive for an investment group, travels to France to acquire a renowned champagne brand before Christmas. However, her plans become complicated upon meeting a charming Parisian, with whom romantic sparks fly - then turns out to be the champagne founder's son.

The film was released on Netflix on November 19, 2025.

== Plot ==
During a meeting at an American conglomerate, The Roth Group (TRG), Sydney suggests they enter the Champagne business, so her boss Marvin asks her to go to Paris to buy the Champagne Château from Hugo Cassell. Her sister Skyler extracts a promise from Sydney that she take one night off in Paris to see the city.

In Paris, Sydney visits a bookstore called Les Etoiles, where a French gentleman Henri helps her. He confesses he does not really work there but wants to eventually open a bookstore that also serves wine. Henri offers to guide Sydney around the city and she accepts.

Henri takes Sydney to see the Eiffel Tower and treats her to crepes and hot wine. He says one of his biggest regrets is having misplaced the book Le Petit Prince, that was gifted to him by his mother who died when he was six. She shares about having been married for two years, which ended when her husband cheated on her. The pair then kiss and sleep together.

The next morning, Sydney arrives late for her meeting with Hugo Cassell and is shocked to find Henri there, who happens to be Hugo's son. Roberto, Otto, and Brigitte, Sydney's competitors for the acquisition of Château Cassell, are also in attendance. All of them are invited to spend a couple of days at Château Cassell. Marvin calls Sydney after the meeting and, unhappy with her lack of aggressiveness, sends another employee there, Ryan, to assist her in the purchase of the Chateau.

At Château de Cassel, the guests attend a reception before being taken to a Christmas celebration. The next day, Hugo takes a walk with Sydney and shows the area around the Château where he married his late wife, Sophie. Later, while chasing the family dog, Sydney finds the missing Le Petit Prince near a wine cellar.

Ryan arrives at Château Cassell and quietly reveals to Sydney that TRG is planning to ultimately hand over the Château to the Japanese company Takami, making a $50 million profit in the process, and congratulates her for her support. Henri overhears the conversation and is upset but leaves before she voices her opposition to Ryan's scheme. Sydney then goes to see Henri, who tells her that they cannot be together.

Sydney quits TRG and tells Hugo of TRG's plans before returning to the hotel. The next day, he sells Château Cassell to Roberto to co-own it as Sydney had warned him about TRG's motives, and Henri realizes he made a terrible mistake doubting her. He finds her at the bookstore, where they make up.

A year later at the Château Cassell, Henri and Sydney celebrate Christmas as they have opened the wine bookstore, with Roberto, Otto and Skyler in attendance.

== Cast ==
- Minka Kelly as Sydney Price
- Tom Wozniczka as Henri Cassell
- Thibault de Montalembert as Hugo Cassell
- Sean Amsing as Roberto Salazar
- Flula Borg as Otto Moller
- Astrid Whettnall as Brigitte Laurent
- Xavier Samuel as Ryan Garner
- Mitchell Mullen as Marvin Roth
- Maeve Courtier-Lilley as Skyler Price

== Production ==
The film is written and directed by Mark Steven Johnson. It is produced by Stephanie Slack and Margret H. Huddleston for Off Camera Entertainment. The cast is led by Minka Kelly and includes Tom Wozniczka, Flula Borg, and Xavier Samuel as well as Sean Amsing, Thibault De Montalemert and Astrid Whettnall. Filming locations included the Chateau Comtesse Lafond in Épernay and Château de Taissy in Taissy, France in 2024.

== Music ==
The original score was composed by Ryan Shore.

== Release ==
The film was released on Netflix on November 19, 2025.

== Reception ==
=== Viewership ===
The film was well-viewed, reported to have gained over 20 million views in the initial week following its release, and topping the Netflix worldwide film chart, and reaching Number 1 in 58 individual countries, including the United States, France and the United Kingdom.

=== Critical response ===
On the review aggregator website Rotten Tomatoes, 72% of 18 critics' reviews are positive.
