= Mark Steven Johnson =

American filmmaker

- Born: October 30, 1964 (age 61); Hastings, Minnesota, U.S.
- Occupations: Film director, screenwriter, producer
- Years active: 1993–present

Mark Steven Johnson (born October 30, 1964) is an American filmmaker.

== Life and career ==
Johnson began his career writing the Warner Bros. films Grumpy Old Men and its sequel Grumpier Old Men. Johnson wrote and directed two comic book-based films, Daredevil and Ghost Rider, as well as the film Simon Birch. Johnson also wrote the story for the film Christopher Robin and directed the Netflix films Love, Guaranteed and Love in the Villa. Most recently, Johnson wrote and directed Champagne Problems, also for Netflix.

== Filmography ==
Year	Film	Credited as		
Year	Film	Director	Writer	Producer
1993	Grumpy Old Men	No	Yes	No
1995	Grumpier Old Men	No	Yes	No
1996	Big Bully	No	Yes	No
1998	Simon Birch	Yes	Yes	No
1998	Jack Frost	No	Yes	No
2003	Daredevil	Yes	Yes	No
2005	Elektra	No	No	Executive
2007	Ghost Rider	Yes	Yes	No
2010	When in Rome	Yes	No	Yes
2011	Ghost Rider: Spirit of Vengeance	No	No	Executive
2013	Killing Season	Yes	No	No
2013	Grudge Match	No	No	Yes
2018	Christopher Robin	No	Story	No
2019	Finding Steve McQueen	Yes	No	Executive
2020	Love, Guaranteed	Yes	No	No
2022	Love in the Villa	Yes	Yes	Yes
2025	Champagne Problems	Yes	Yes	Yes
