= Love in the Villa =

- Directed by: Mark Steven Johnson
- Written by: Mark Steven Johnson
- Produced by: Mark Steven Johnson
- Starring: Kat Graham; Tom Hopper
- Cinematography: José David Montero
- Edited by: Lee Haxall
- Music by: Ryan Shore
- Production companies: Off Camera Entertainment; Grumpy Entertainment; Netflix Studios
- Distributed by: Netflix
- Release date: September 1, 2022
- Running time: 115 minutes
- Country: United States
- Language: English

Love in the Villa is a 2022 American romantic comedy film written, directed and produced by Mark Steven Johnson. It stars Kat Graham, Tom Hopper, and Raymond Ablack.

Julie Hutton follows her lifelong dream to visit romantic Verona, Italy, shortly after a breakup, only to find her reserved villa is double-booked, so she has to share it with a cynical British man.

The film was released on Netflix on September 1, 2022.

== Plot ==
Minneapolis-based teacher Julie Hutton holds a deep fascination for William Shakespeare's Romeo and Juliet. She is about to go on a long-awaited trip to Verona with her boyfriend Brandon of four years. In an effort to explain her excitement, she unsuccessfully tries to expose her third-grade students to the centuries-old love story.

When she presents Brandon with an hour-by-hour itinerary for their entire stay, he is overwhelmed and ends their relationship. Julie finds herself traveling alone for what she had hoped would be a week of romance. After an uncomfortable flight in economy class, her bags are lost and she has a harrowing taxi ride in a tiny FIAT car.

On arrival, Julie finds the villa has been double-booked through two different short-term rental sites, while the ongoing European wine expo means that all local accommodation is fully booked. The villa owner, Silvio, suggests she share the place with the other tenant, a British wine expert named Charlie.

Julie tries to follow her jam-packed itinerary but soon is forced to abandon it. Feeling dejected, she returns to the villa to find Charlie has read her personal journal. He equates going back to an ex to putting on dirty underwear after showering. Julie hangs up on Brandon.

Charlie explains his job involves securing exclusive rights on wines cheaply to maximize the UK importer's profits. Soon after, Julie discovers his extreme allergies when street cats come pouring in when cracking a window. When she complains about him on the phone to her friend Rob, he suggests she drive him out.

Julie uses green olives, a known attractant to cats, to trigger a feline invasion of Charlie's bedroom. Waking up covered in welts and in pain, he "declares war" on her. In the staircase he comes across her bags being delivered from the airline. He sends them back, saying Julie was institutionalized and wants them donated.

Julia retaliates by getting the locks changed, then contacts the police to report Charlie as a burglar. After being released from jail, he comes back even angrier. Charlie creates a public shrine with bits from Julie's diary about her breakup with Brandon.

Charlie calls a truce and offers to share a meal with her. He prepares pastissada de caval, a typical dish of Verona. When Julie discovers it is horse, they end up in a food fight.

When the commotion reaches the plaza below, the police warns them they will be jailed overnight if they again disrupt the peace. Charlie later apologizes to Julia for everything. He discloses he substituted mushrooms for the horse, and they spend the evening drinking wine. Strolling around town, Julie makes a wish at the Fontana Madonna Verona, then takes them to the bronze statue of Juliet where they both make wishes.

The next day, she takes Charlie on the Juliet tour so he can see it from the eyes of a romantic. Julie reveals her excessively romantic parents caused her to set the bar high; he explains he grew up with five brothers and no mother.

That evening at the Vinitalia event, Julie lets wine grower Carlo Caruso know how wonderful his wine is, inadvertently blocking Charlie's company's offer. Charlie asks her to dance and they almost kiss. Arriving back at the villa, his fiancée Cassie is there to surprise him, which takes him aback, as they were on a break.

Brandon shows up in the morning. That evening he and Julie end up getting invited to share a table with Cassie and Charlie. Julie gets very drunk, so they leave. Charlie breaks up with Cassie, follows the others, and inadvertently sees Brandon propose. Charlie misses Julie's rejection. Silvio convinces Charlie to track down Julie. When he does, they both realize they have fallen in love.

== Cast ==
- Kat Graham as Julie Hutton
- Tom Hopper as Charlie Fletcher
- Raymond Ablack as Brandon
- Laura Hopper as Cassie
- Sean Amsing as Rob
- Emilio Solfrizzi as Silvio D'Angelo
- Vincent Riotta as Carlo Caruso
- Saverio Sculli as Amore Airline Passenger

== Soundtrack ==
Ryan Shore composed the original score for the film.

== Release ==
The film was released on September 1, 2022 on Netflix.

== Reception ==
On the review aggregator website Rotten Tomatoes, 32% of 22 critics' reviews are positive, with an average rating of 4.7/10. Metacritic, which uses a weighted average, assigned the film a score of 50 out of 100, based on five critics, indicating "mixed or average" reviews.

Prateek Sur of Outlook India gave it a rating of 2/5. Adrian Horton of Guardian also gave it a rating of 2/5 and called it an "immediately forgettable Netflix romcom."

=== Awards and nominations ===
Ryan Shore received a 2023 Music+Sound Awards Best Original Feature Score nomination. This film was also nominated for the Best Music Supervision for a Non-Theatrically Released Film at 13th Annual Guild of Music Supervisors Awards.
