= Keep Off =

2006 film

- Theatrical release poster
- Directed by: Maria Peters
- Written by: Maria Peters
- Based on: Afblijven by Carry Slee
- Starring: Sem Veeger; Matthijs van de Sande Bakhuyzen
- Edited by: Ot Louw
- Production companies: Shooting Star Filmcompany; Foreign Media Group; Katholieke Radio Omroep
- Distributed by: RCV Film Distribution; Bridge Entertainment Group
- Release date: 5 October 2006
- Running time: 100 minutes
- Country: Netherlands
- Language: Dutch

Keep Off (Dutch: Afblijven) is a 2006 Dutch teen film directed by Maria Peters, based on the children's novel Afblijven by Carry Slee. The film, much like the book, explores drug abuse by adolescents and the negative effects it has on their lives.

The film received a Golden Film (100,000 visitors).

== Plot ==
Fourteen-year-old Melissa (Sem Veeger) pretends she's taking ballet lessons, to please her strict father, while she is in fact a hip hop dancer. She is given the opportunity to audition for background dancer in a video clip, but grows uncertain of her abilities. A newly met friend, Jim, gives her XTC, which enhances her performance. She is then selected to be in the music video. Her close friends Jordi and Fleur watch as Melissa becomes dependent on both XTC and Jim, who is now her new boyfriend, but can't convince Melissa she is making a wrong turn. At the music video shoot, Melissa fails to perform as well as she did before due to a lack of XTC and leaves the set. She has a fight with Jim and disappears soon after.

As Jordi tries to find Melissa, she calls him and states she will be fine and she'll be at her "house" tonight. As the call was cut off, Jordi grows even more concerned and figures out where Melissa will be as he finds a poster announcing a "house party" the same night. Hoping to find Melissa, Jordi attends the house party, only to see Melissa being treated by paramedics and taken to the hospital in critical state. Melissa ends up in a coma while Jordi finds out contaminated XTC pills were what caused her to collapse at the house party. After Melissa wakes up from her coma, Jordi convinces himself something needs to be done and enlists the police in order to arrest Melissa's boyfriend Jim. It is revealed Jim distributed the contaminated pills. Jordi then finds it difficult to become romantically involved with Melissa, but ultimately gives in.

== Cast ==
- Sem Veeger as Melissa
- Matthijs van de Sande Bakhuyzen as Jordi
- Melody Klaver as Debby
- Jim Bakkum as Toine
- Juliann Ubbergen as Kevin
- Tessa Schram as Fleur
- Tommie Venneker as Jim
- Gijs Scholten van Aschat as father of Melissa
- Loes Wouterson as mother of Melissa
- Thijs Römer as Guido (video clip director)
- Brainpower as himself
- Anneke Blok as mother of Jordi
- Geert Lageveen as father of Jordi
- Plien van Bennekom as Miss Zuurbier (German teacher)
- Tjebbo Gerritsma as grandmother of Melissa
- Stefan de Walle as policeman
- Michiel Romeyn as boss of Jordi
- Carry Slee as bus passenger
- Giovanni Kemper as dancer of the danceschool of Melissa

== Release ==
The film was released on DVD on 6 February 2007.
