= Northern Light (film) =

- Directed by: David Lammers
- Release date: 2006
- Running time: 85 minutes
- Country: Netherlands
- Language: Dutch

Northern Light (Dutch: Langer licht) is a 2006 Dutch film, directed by David Lammers set in Amsterdam-Noord, a borough of Amsterdam.

Mitchell (Dai Carter) is a 15-year-old boy who lives with his father Lucien (Raymond Thiry), following his mother and sister's deaths in an accident. Mitchell finds a girlfriend Kiki (Melody Klaver).

Mitchell is bullied by Lucien. Even though he is a teacher in a sports school, he teaches his students things like talking about things bothering them; however, he himself communicates very poorly with Mitchell. Mitchell provocatively shows up dancing in a ballet tutu on his birthday party. Lucien freaks out and injures Mitchell. Mitchell goes in the tutu on his bike to some friends. They are not shocked about his tutu, they just wonder "Does your father know that nowadays you walk around like that?". Lucien starts living at his sports school. The film ends with a beginning of reconciliation: also they still hardly talk to each other, at least they drink coffee together.

Apart from the friction between Lucien and Mitchell the film shows a very friendly multicultural community.
