= Melody Klaver =

Dutch actress (born 1990)

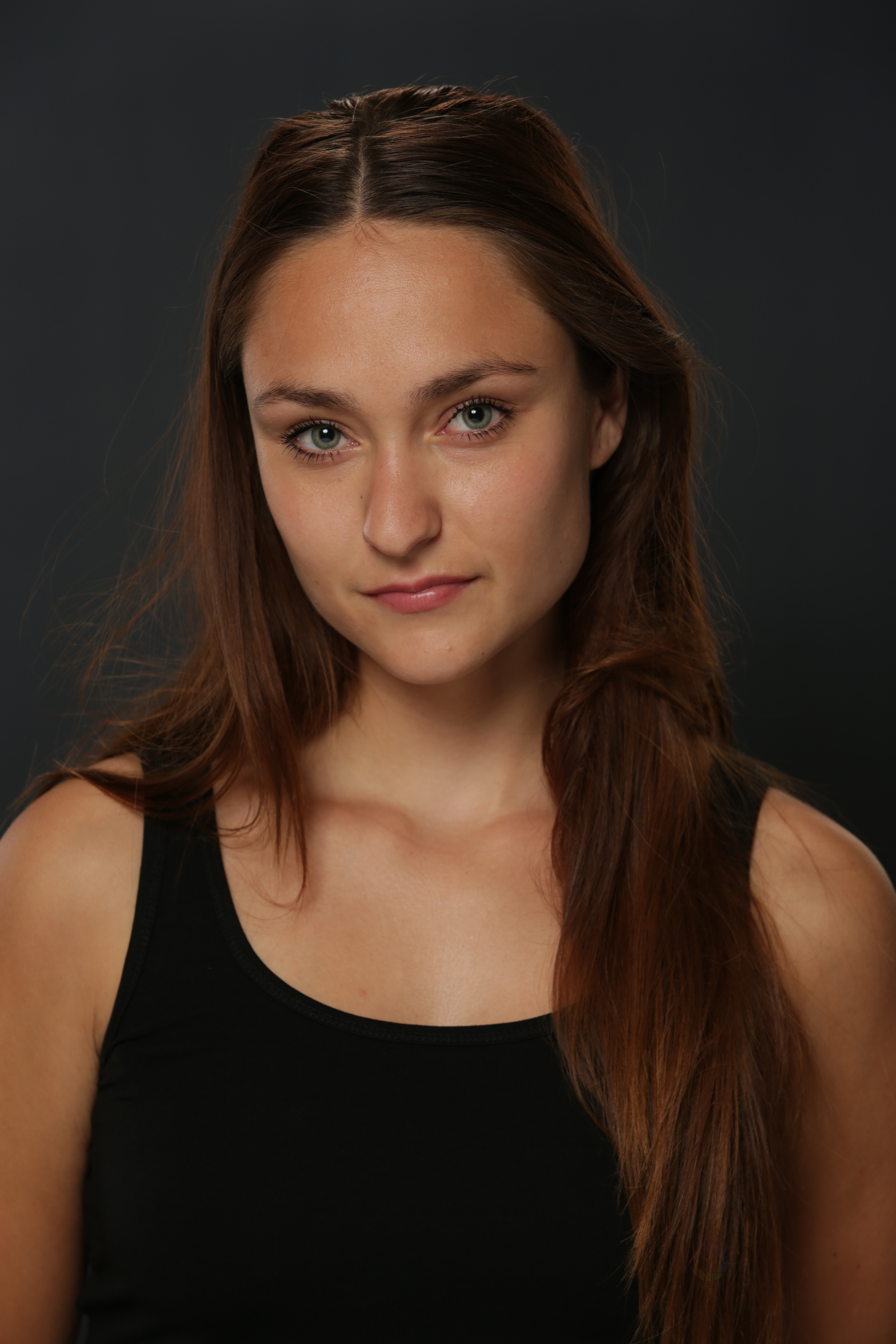
- Klaver in 2015
- Born: 9 September 1990 (age 35); Amsterdam, The Netherlands
- Notable work: Heleen in Diep (2005 Dutch drama film)

Melody Zoë Klaver (born 9 September 1990) is a Dutch actress.

== Early life and education ==
Klaver was born in Amsterdam, Netherlands and grew up in the suburb town Abcoude. She has two older sisters, presenter/actress Kimberley Klaver and dancer Stephanie Klaver. She attended dance lessons at the Lucia Marthas Institute for Performing Arts from the age of 4, but had to quit at 15 due to her busy acting schedule.

She finished her VWO (pre-university secondary education) at the Sint Nicolaas Lyceum in 2008, and then attended a course at the Royal Academy of Dramatic Arts in London. Klaver received her professional training (BFA in Acting) at the Maastricht Academy of Dramatic Arts, where she graduated in July 2014.

== Career ==
When she was 15 years old Klaver was nominated for a Golden Calf for Best Actress (Deep), which made her the youngest actress ever to be nominated for this award. She lost it to Carice Van Houten (Blackbook).

Later she did win the Tudor Award for Best Actress (Deep) in Geneva and a Rembrandt Award for Best actress (Winter in wartime).

At the International Theatre school Festival 2014 in Amsterdam she won the Kemna Award for her role as Irina Arkadina in The Seagull (Checkov) for best and most outstanding graduating actor/actress of the Netherlands and Belgium.

Before and after her education Klaver played (lead) roles in art-house films such as ‘Northern Light’ (Langer Licht) by David Lammers, ‘Deep’ (Diep) by Simone van Dusseldorp, ‘Dusk’ (Schemer) by Hanro Smitsman and in box-office hits such as ‘XTC just don't do it!’ (Afblijven!) by Maria Peters and ‘Winter in Wartime’ (Oorlogswinter) by award-winner Martin Koolhoven.

On television Klaver was seen in Arcadia, the One-night-stand series, Once upon a Ladder, Near Neighbours, and in series like Godforsaken (NPO), Intoxicated (NPO) and playing super rich Pauline Bestevaer in ‘The Jackpot’ (De Hoofdprijs) (SBS6).

== Awards ==
- Tudor Award for Best Actress at the International Film festival Geneva for her role in "Deep" (Diep, 2005).
- Nomination for Best Actress at the Dutch FilmFestival for here role in "Deep" (Dutch equivalent of the Academy awards)
- Rembrandt Award (People's Choice award) for Best Actress, for her role in Winter in Wartime (Oorlogswinter, 2008).
- Kemna Award for best and most outstanding actor at the International Theatre school Festival in Amsterdam 2014.

== Personal life ==
In June 2007, Klaver's boyfriend, Timo Smeehuijzen, was killed by a suicide attack during his military service in Afghanistan. In 2024 Klaver gave birth to her first child, a son named Luukje.

== Filmography ==
=== Films ===
- Deep (2005 feature film) - Heleen (lead)
- Northern Light (2006 feature film) - Kiki
- Afblijven (2006 feature film) - Debby
- Winter in Wartime (2008 feature film) - Erica van Beusekom
- Dusk (2010 feature film) - Frauk (lead)
- Near Neighbours (2010 TV-movie) - Felicity
- Brasserie Valentijn (2016 feature film) - Kelly
- Once upon a ladder (2016 TV-movie) - Jenny
- Silk Road (2017 feature film) - Agnes
- To catch a fly (2017 shortfilm) - Daniëlla Fehér (lead)
- Rafaël (2018)

=== Television ===
- Roes (2008) - Rosanne (lead)
- The Jackpot (2009) - Pauline Bestevaer
- Van God Los (2012) - Rochelle (lead), episode Bitchfight
- Bagels & Bubbels (2015) - Shelly
- I know who you are (2018) - Charley Meurs
- Arcadia (2023) - Alex Jans

Theatre: Played leading roles in theatreplays from Theater Utrecht, Bos Theaterproductions and De Tekstsmederij.
