= Deep (2005 film) =

2005 film

- Theatrical release poster
- Directed by: Simone van Dusseldorp
- Screenplay by: Tamara Bos
- Produced by: Marc Bary
- Starring: Melody Klaver
- Cinematography: Ton Peters
- Edited by: Peter Alderliesten
- Music by: David van der Heijden
- Production company: IJswater Films
- Distributed by: A-Film Distribution
- Release date: November 10, 2005
- Running time: 90 minutes
- Country: Netherlands
- Language: Dutch

Deep (Dutch: Diep) is a 2005 Dutch drama film about the 14-year-old girl Heleen (played by 15-year-old Melody Klaver).

Many scenes are in extreme close-up.

== Plot ==
Heleen practises tongue kissing first on her arm, then on another girl who is her friend, then does it with boys. On holiday in France she likes a French boy Bernard (Hunter Bussemaker). However, when she tells him she loves him, she is uncomfortable with the bold way he starts touching her. Axel (Stijn Koomen) is a childhood friend who is in love with her. However, Heleen is more interested in Axel's English friend Steve (Damien Hope). Heleen is torn between her mother's statement that sex is like eating a sandwich, and Steve's that "sex should be like a voyage to the sublime, without true love no sublime". Steve rejects sex with Heleen.

Encouraged by Steve and Axel, Heleen smokes some cannabis, but she does not really like it. Also her mother Quinta (Monic Hendrickx) encourages her to do it. She also encourages Heleen to give Axel a kiss; after all, they had a fake marriage as young children. Provocatively Heleen gives Axel an elaborate tongue kiss in Quinta's presence.

Quinta asks Heleen not to walk around the house in only underpants: it makes her new lover uncomfortable. Indignantly Heleen shows her little brother her bare breasts and asks whether he is shocked. However, he does not care, he is indifferent to them.

Axel threatens to commit suicide if Heleen refuses to have sex with him. She masturbates him (not fully shown). With the consent of her mother and after getting hormonal contraception drugs, Heleen has intercourse with Axel. She thinks it is okay, not very great, but anyway she is glad to have done it.

== Production ==
Director Simone van Dusseldorp revealed Melody Klaver found the scenario quite intense, but after a long conversation with her and her mother, she accepted the leading role. "Under certain conditions. She didn't want to be filmed too close with her breasts exposed. That's also quite annoying when you're fourteen. I took that into account. I wasn't interested in the nudity, but in the vulnerability. Diep is a film about sexuality, so there had to be real kissing, not movie kissing. We approached that as technically as possible: brushing teeth and getting started," Van Dusseldorp said.

== See also ==
- List of Dutch films of 2005
