= Scooby-Doo! WrestleMania Mystery =

- DVD cover featuring John Cena and Scooby-Doo on the foreground
- Directed by: Brandon Vietti
- Written by: Michael Ryan
- Based on: Scooby-Doo by William Hanna, Joseph Barbera, Iwao Takamoto, Joe Ruby, & Ken Spears
- Produced by: Brandon Vietti
- Starring: Frank Welker; Grey DeLisle; Mindy Cohn; Matthew Lillard; Charles S. Dutton; Mary McCormack; John Cena; Brodus Clay; Michael Cole; Kane; AJ Lee; Santino Marella; The Miz; Triple H Vince McMahon
- Edited by: Kyle Stafford
- Music by: Ryan Shore
- Production companies: Warner Bros. Animation; WWE Studios
- Distributed by: Warner Home Video
- Release dates: March 24, 2014 (UK); March 25, 2014 (United States)
- Running time: 84 minutes
- Country: United States
- Language: English

Scooby-Doo! WrestleMania Mystery (also released as Scooby-Doo! The WWE Mystery) is a 2014 direct-to-DVD animated comedy mystery film and the twenty-second film in the direct-to-video series of Scooby-Doo films. It is a co-production between Warner Bros. Animation and WWE Studios. The film features Scooby and the gang solving a mystery at WrestleMania. It was released on March 24, 2014 in the United Kingdom and on March 25, 2014 in the United States by Warner Home Video.

== Plot ==
Scooby-Doo and Shaggy Rogers have beaten the hardest level of WWE's latest video game and won an all-expenses-paid stay at WWE City to watch WrestleMania, with the rest of Mystery, Inc. agreeing to join them at their insistence. Upon their arrival, the gang meet John Cena, who gives the gang VIP tickets for the next event; his trainer Cookie; and the latter's nephew Ruben.

As the show gets underway, Vince McMahon unveils the WWE Championship belt, the title for which was vacated due to Kane's previous match being overturned and is now available over the weekend. Later that night, Daphne Blake and Velma Dinkley overhear Ruben and Cookie arguing over the latter not becoming an official wrestler due to a leg injury he suffered. Meanwhile, Shaggy and Scooby are attacked by a "Ghost Bear". Triple H and Brodus Clay intervene, but the monster overpowers them before disappearing. The following morning, Mystery Inc. learn from WWE executive Ms. Richards that the Ghost Bear has been terrorizing WWE City for the past few weeks. After McMahon asks the gang to solve the mystery to protect the championship belt, Cena and Sin Cara explain that the Ghost Bear originated over a century prior, when it was defeated by Cara's ancestor, Sin Cara Grande, on the land that WWE City would later be built on. Furious over the loss, the bear went on a rampage until Grande exiled it to a nearby cave, at the cost of his leg and career. Cara fears that its ghost was stirred by WrestleMania and is now seeking revenge.

The next day, Scooby is caught stealing the championship belt, though Velma proves he was in a state of deep hypnosis during the act as Ruben deduces the video game contained flashing lights that implanted post-hypnotic suggestions into Scooby's brain. Despite this, McMahon offers to drop the charges if he and Shaggy can defeat Kane during WrestleMania and are given a crash course in wrestling taught by Cookie and AJ Lee. Meanwhile, the rest of Mystery Inc. investigate the cave that the Ghost Bear was originally exiled to. Inside, they discover a hidden room containing books on hypnosis, schematics for an EMP device, and a calendar confirming a plot against WrestleMania. Suddenly, the Ghost Bear attacks the group, forcing them into a storm drain, though Cena fights it off before realizing the drain leads directly underneath WWE City. After the gang inform Richards of their discovery, Cookie advocates for WrestleMania's cancellation, but Fred Jones suggests using the event to solve the mystery.

During Scooby, Shaggy, and Kane's fight, Velma deduces the belt recovered from Scooby's possession is a replica and contains the EMP device. Cena tries to take it out of the arena, but it activates, shutting down the underground generator. The Ghost Bear soon arrives and wreaks havoc, but the wrestlers use pyrotechnics to illuminate the arena while Scooby and Kane continue their fight. When the monster attacks the ring, Scooby and Kane join forces with Ruben, Cena, and Cara to defeat it. The Ghost Bear is then revealed to be Cookie. Feeling his career ended too soon, he plotted to use Scooby to steal the belt and tarnish the organization's reputation in retaliation.

As Cena recovers the real belt, Cookie is arrested while McMahon offers Ruben a place on the WWE roster before awarding the belt to Scooby and Shaggy.

== Voice cast ==
- Frank Welker as Scooby-Doo and Fred Jones
- Mindy Cohn as Velma Dinkley
- Grey DeLisle as Daphne Blake
- Matthew Lillard as Shaggy Rogers
- Charles S. Dutton as Cookie
- Mary McCormack as Ms. Richards
- John Cena as himself
- AJ Lee as herself
- Santino Marella as himself
- The Miz as himself
- Triple H as himself
- Michael Cole as himself
- Vince McMahon as himself
- Brodus Clay as himself
- Kane as himself
- Corey Burton as Bayard and WrestleMania's announcer
- Bumper Robinson as Ruben
- Fred Tatasciore as the vocal effects of the Ghost Bear

Additionally, Sin Cara, Jerry Lawler, Sgt. Slaughter, Jimmy Hart, Big Show, Alberto Del Rio, Cameron, Naomi and the Young Justice incarnations of Wonder Girl, Artemis, Zatanna and Miss Martian all make non-speaking cameo appearances.

== Production ==
On August 14, 2012, Warner Bros. and WWE Studios announced that they would co-produce a Scooby-Doo animated feature that will find Scooby and the gang solving a mystery at WrestleMania.

=== Soundtrack ===
The original music score was composed by Ryan Shore. The film also features the WWE entrance music themes of The Miz, Mr. McMahon, John Cena, Kane, and AJ Lee.

== Critical reception ==
Matt Fowler of IGN gave the film a "Mediocre" score of 5.0 out of 10, citing that "Scooby-Doo! WrestleMania Mystery will most definitely delight your children, whether they're fans of one, or both, properties. It's well-meaning, snappily animated, and it's fun to hear the [wrestlers] do their own voices."

== Television retitling ==
In its television premiere on Cartoon Network on Saturday, July 26, 2014, the film was retitled Scooby-Doo! The WWE Mystery and the event the gang are in WWE City to witness was renamed "SuperStar-Mania". This film is the first of the animated films to get a TV-PG rating for "violence" due to the plot of the film involving wrestling. All previous Scooby-Doo animated films received a TV-Y7-FV rating.

== Sequel ==
On September 15, 2014, WWE and Warner Bros. announced a direct sequel to WrestleMania Mystery to be released in 2016 by the name of Scooby-Doo! and WWE: Curse of the Speed Demon. Hulk Hogan was billed to be prominently featured. However, on July 23, 2015, WWE terminated their contract with Hogan due to racist comments, leaving speculation as to his appearance in the film.

In the UK, the film was released on August 8, 2016.

== Follow-up film ==
Scooby-Doo! Frankencreepy was released on August 19, 2014.
