= Nimer Rashed =

British television director

Nimer Rashed is a British film, television and video games writer and director, as well as former child actor, best known for directing the Netflix adaptations Fool Me Once, Missing You and Run Away of the respective Harlan Coben novels.

== Early life ==
As a child, Rashed worked as an actor for the Royal Shakespeare Company. with roles in the LWT drama Forever Green, and the period drama Impromptu. In 2006, he won The Sir Peter Ustinov Television Scriptwriting Award at the International Emmy Awards for his original script "The Great McGinty"

== Directing ==
Rashed began his directing career in 2008 with the short film Baghdad Express, featuring fellow Merchant Taylors' alumnus Riz Ahmed. He subsequently directed several other short films, including Touch, for which he was awarded the Virgin Media Shorts Grand Prize, judged by Shane Meadows and David Tennant.

Rashed then trained as a director as part of the BBC Writersroom New Directors' Scheme. After successfully applying to Directors UK and Creative England's High-End TV Drama Programme, he worked as 2nd Unit Director on Mike Bartlett's Press, as well as on NBC's The Capture and Amazon's The Feed, and was named on the BBC New Talent Hotlist. During this time, Rashed also directed episodes of Doctors, Holby City, Casualty, EastEnders and The Good Karma Hospital.

In 2023, it was announced that Rashed would be a director on Fool Me Once, a Netflix adaptation of Harlan Coben's novel of the same name, starring Richard Armitage, Michelle Keegan and Joanna Lumley. He was subsequently signed on to direct the further adaptations, Missing You, starring Rosalind Eleazar, and Run Away, starring James Nesbitt and Minnie Driver, serving as Lead Director on the latter. Among this, Rashed also directed on the fourth series of the period crime drama Miss Scarlet and The Duke.

== Selected filmography ==
Year	Title	Credited as				Notes	Ref(s)
Year	Title	Actor	Producer	Director	Role(s)	Notes	Ref(s)
1989-1992	Forever Green	Yes	No	No	Tom Boult	18 episodes	
1991	Impromptu	Yes	No	No	Didier		
2008	Baghdad Express	No	No	Yes			
2013	Touch	No	No	Yes			
2017	London Tomorrow	No	No	Yes			
2019	Holby City	No	No	Yes		1 episode	
2019	Hollyoaks	No	No	Yes		5 episodes	
2016-2020	Doctors	No	No	Yes		29 episodes	
2019-2021	Casualty	No	No	Yes		2 episodes	
2020-2021	EastEnders	No	No	Yes		19 episodes	
2022	The Good Karma Hospital	No	No	Yes		2 episodes	
2024	Fool Me Once	No	No	Yes		3 episodes	
2024	Miss Scarlet and The Duke	No	No	Yes		3 episodes	
2025	Missing You	No	No	Yes		3 episodes	
2026	Run Away	No	Yes	Yes		5 episodes	
