= Tell No One (disambiguation) =

Tell No One is a 2006 French thriller film.

Tell No One may also refer to:

- Tell No One (2012 film), 2012 Italian comedy film
- Tell No One (2019 film), 2019 Polish documentary film
- Tell No One (novel), 2001 American thriller novel
