= Missing You (Coben novel) =

2014 novel by Harlan Coben

- Author: Harlan Coben
- Language: English
- Genre: Thriller, mystery, suspense
- Publisher: Dutton
- Publication date: March 18, 2014
- Publication place: United States
- Media type: Print (hardback, paperback), e-book, audiobook
- Pages: 399
- ISBN: 9780525953494

Missing You is a suspense and thriller novel by American writer Harlan Coben, published in 2014. The novel has garnered attention for its intricate plot involving online dating, unsolved murder, and the emotional journey of its protagonist, NYPD Detective Kat Donovan. Missing You was nominated for a 2014 Audie Award for Mystery.

== Plot ==
Missing You delves into the life of Kat Donovan, an NYPD detective whose professional prowess contrasts sharply with her personal vulnerabilities. Kat, a figure of strength and resilience at work, grapples with loneliness and a longing for connection in her private life. Her journey into online dating marks the beginning of a tumultuous chapter, where her past, symbolized by the appearance of her ex-fiancé Jeff on the dating site, collides with her present. The plot thickens as Kat, initially seeking closure with Jeff, becomes enmeshed in a far more sinister web.

The narrative takes a dark turn with the introduction of a grim subplot involving individuals held captive and tortured for their financial information by a group of ruthless criminals. This subplot intertwines with Kat's personal quest, as she not only seeks answers about her past relationship but also investigates the suspicious disappearance of a woman linked to the online dating site. Kat's professional investigation into her father's long-ago murder adds another layer of complexity to the story. Her visit to the dying hitman imprisoned for her father's murder, and his cryptic last words, leave her questioning the truth about her father's death. As these multiple plot threads gradually converge, Kat, alongside the son of the missing woman, unravels a tapestry of deceit, violence, and personal betrayal.

== Publication ==
Harlan Coben's Missing You was released on March 18, 2014, by Dutton, and available in hardcover, paperback, e-book, and audiobook formats.

== Reception ==
Missing You has been well-received, garnering praise for its engaging plot and character depth. Kirkus Reviews categorizes the novel as a suspense and general thriller, emphasizing its compelling nature and its appeal to fans of the genre. The review suggests that the intricate storyline and engaging narrative make Missing You a notable read. Bookreporter describes Missing You as possibly Coben's best book to date, filled with unexpected twists and complex plot threads. The protagonist, Kat Donovan, is portrayed as a relatable character facing multifaceted challenges. The review highlights Coben's adept handling of multiple plots and his ability to deliver a narrative that is both complex and believable.

VJ Books discusses the collectability and appreciation of the novel, particularly focusing on signed first editions and the novel's value to collectors and fans of Coben's work. These reviews collectively highlight Missing You as a standout in the thriller genre, acclaimed for its richly woven narrative, well-crafted characters, and the suspense that keeps readers engaged until the very end.

== Adaptations ==
In March 2014, a day before the novel's release, the film rights were acquired by Warner Bros. and Brett Ratner's RatPac Entertainment. John Cheng and James Packer were set to be executive producers. In May 2014, Stephany Folsom was hired to write the script. In November 2017, in the wake of the MeToo movement, Warner Bros. announced it had severed ties with Ratner after six women had accused him of sexual misconduct. Afterwards, Ratner announced that he was "[stepping] away from all Warner Bros.-related activities" and Warner Bros. was reviewing the issue. In April 2018, Warner Bros. declined to renew its $450-million co-financing deal with Ratner's RatPac Entertainment.

In January 2024, it was reported that Netflix was adapting the novel into a limited crime drama series. The project began filming in spring 2024, with the involvement of Coben's production company Final Twist Productions and Nicola Shindler's Quay Street Productions. Shindler had previously produced a Netflix television series adaptation of Coben's 2016 novel Fool Me Once. The series premiered on Netflix on January 1, 2025.
