= Gone for Good =

Gone for Good may refer to:

- "Gone for Good," a song by Morphine from their 1995 album Yes
- "Gone for Good", a song by The Shins from their 2003 album Chutes Too Narrow
- Gone for Good (novel), a novel by Harlan Coben
- Gone for Good (TV series), Netflix original series based on the novel by Coben

== See also ==
- "Gone for Goode", an episode of Homicide: Life on the Street
