= Miracle Cure =

Miracle Cure may refer to:

- Miracle Mineral Supplement, chlorine dioxide falsely promoted as a cure for illnesses
- "Miracle Cure" (Diagnosis: Murder), a 1993 television episode
- Miracle Cure (novel), a 1996 novel by Harlan Coben
- "Miracle Cure" (song), a 1969 song by the Who
- "Miracle Cure", a song by Blank & Jones from their 2007 album The Logic of Pleasure
