= Backspin (disambiguation) =

Backspin refers to a sports ball, such as a tennis ball, that is rotating in a reverse direction from its trajectory.

Backspin or Back spin may refer to:

- BackSpin, a classic hip-hop radio station on Sirius XM Radio
- Back Spin (novel), a novel by Harlan Coben
- Back spinning, the act of manually manipulating a vinyl record backwards during playback
