= Just One Look (novel) =

Novel by Harlan Coben

- First edition (US)
- Author: Harlan Coben
- Language: English
- Genre: Crime novel, mystery
- Publisher: Dutton
- Publication date: April 2004
- Publication place: United States
- Media type: Print (hardcover)
- Pages: 370 pp (first edition, hardback)
- ISBN: 0-525-94791-4
- OCLC: 54372744
- Dewey Decimal: 813/.54 22
- LC Class: PS3553.O225 J87 2004

Just One Look is a 2004 novel by Harlan Coben. It is considered his sixth stand-alone novel, but does contain at least one reference to his Myron Bolitar series. The plot centers on a woman whose whole life changes one day upon her taking home a set of pictures, and finding one that does not belong.

== Plot summary ==
After picking up her two young children from school, Grace Lawson looks through a newly developed set of photographs. She finds an odd one in the pack: a mysterious picture from perhaps twenty years ago, showing four strangers she can't identify. But there is one face she recognizes—that of her husband, from before she knew him. When her husband sees the photo that night, he leaves their home and drives off without explanation. She doesn't know where he's going, why he's leaving, or whether or not he's ever coming back. Nor does she realize how dangerous the search for him will be. There are others interested in both her husband's past and that photo, including Eric Wu, a fierce, silent killer who will not be stopped from finding his quarry, no matter who or what stands in his way. Her world turned upside down, filled with doubts about herself and her marriage, Grace must confront the dark corners of her own tragic past as she struggles to learn the truth, find her husband, and save her family.

== Television adaptations ==
=== French series ===
Following the success of their adaptation of No Second Chance, French TV channel TF1 commissioned a mini-series Juste un regard based on Just One Look, which premiered in June 2017 in Switzerland (RTS Un), Belgium & Luxembourg (RTL-TVI) and France, Monaco & Andorra (TF1).

Like prior French adaptations, the series shifts the action to France. It stars Virginie Ledoyen as the lead, renamed Eva Beaufils, and Thierry Neuvic as her husband.

=== Polish series ===
In January 2024, Harlan Coben revealed that a Polish-language adaptation of Just One Look had been commissioned by Netflix. It was released on Netflix on 5 March 2025.
