= Just One Look (miniseries) =

Polish television series

- Polish: Tylko jedno spojrzenie
- Genre: Crime thriller
- Based on: Just One Look by Harlan Coben
- Screenplay by: Agata Malesińska; Maciej Kowalewski
- Directed by: Marek Lechki; Monika Filipowicz
- Starring: Maria Dębska; Cezary Łukaszewicz; Piotr Stramowski
- Country of origin: Poland
- Original language: Polish
- No. of series: 1
- No. of episodes: 6

Production
- Executive producers: Harlan Coben; Andrzej Muszyński
- Producer: Dagmara Bończyk
- Production company: ATM Grupa

Original release
- Network: Netflix
- Release: 5 March 2025

Just One Look (Polish: Tylko jedno spojrzenie) is a 2025 Polish crime thriller television series based on Harlan Coben's 2004 novel of the same name. It was released on Netflix on 5 March 2025.

== Premise ==
A jewellery designer investigates after discovering her husband is missing and she is delivered a photograph of her husband surrounded by people she does not recognise.

== Cast ==
- Maria Dębska as Greta Rembiewska
- Cezary Łukaszewicz as Jacek Ławniczak
- Piotr Stramowski as Jimmy D.
- Mirosław Zbrojewicz as Borys Gajewicz
- Marta Malikowska as Kamila Sośnik
- Mirosław Haniszewski as Robert Bończyk
- Monika Krzywkowska as Sandra Kowalska
- Andrzej Zieliński as Karol Wespa

== Production ==
It is a six-episode, Polish-language miniseries, adapted from the 2004 novel Just One Look by Harlan Coben. It is the second foreign-language adaptation of the novel, after 2017's French-language adaptation Juste un regard. The series is produced by ATM Grupa and directed by Marek Lechki and Monika Filipowicz. The screenplay was adapted by Agata Malesińska and Maciej Kowalewski. The producer is Dagmara Bończyk. The executive producers are Andrzej Muszyński and Harlan Coben, who also previously worked together on the Polish-language adaptations Hold Tight and The Woods.

The cast is led by Maria Dębska and includes Cezary Łukaszewicz and Piotr Stramowski. The cast also includes Mirosław Zbrojewicz, Marta Malikowska, Mirosław Haniszewski, Monika Krzywkowska and Andrzej Zieliński. Filming took place in Warsaw in 2024.

== Release ==
The series was released worldwide on Netflix on 5 March 2025.
