= Mirosław Zbrojewicz =

Polish actor (born 1957)

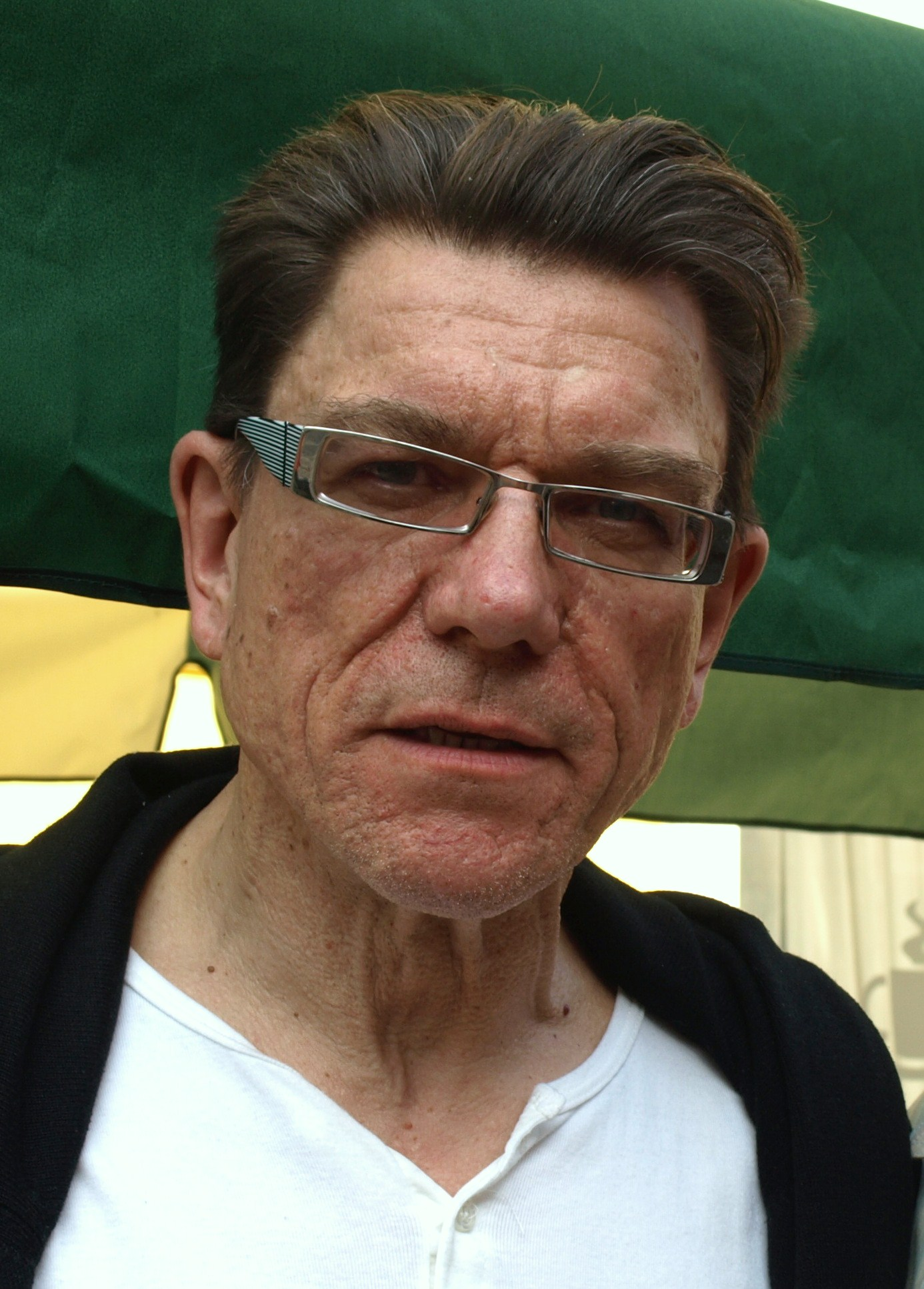
- Zbrojewicz in 2011
- Born: 25 February 1957 (age 69)

Mirosław Zbrojewicz (born 25 February 1957) is a Polish actor.

== Filmography ==
=== Actor cast ===
- 2025: Just One Look as Borys "Gajos" Gajewicz
- 2025: Czarne stokrotki as Luka's father (Dezo Kaliski)
- 2022: Hold Tight as Borys "Gajos" Gajewicz
- 2020: Angel of Death as Włodzimierz Suzin
- 2018: My Secret Terrius (내 뒤에 테리우스) as spy
- 2013: Spies of Warsaw (TV Series) as Marek
- 2011: Kac Wawa as "Kaban"
- 2010: Tajemnica Westerplatte as warrant officer Jan Gryczman
- 2009: Komisarz Blond i wszystko jasne as American general
- 2009: Mniejsze zło as Esbek
- 2009: Un paso adelante as Piotr's dad
- 2009: M jak miłość as Siwy (guest appearance)
- 2008: Lekcje pana Kuki as Arnold
- 2008: Latający Cyprian as innkeeper
- 2007: Den Sorte Madonna as Kuntz
- 2007: Fałszerze – powrót Sfory as Walas
- 2006: Dublerzy as "Wiesiek"
- 2006: Summer love as Boxer
- 2006: Palimpsest as Bury
- 2006: Pętla
- 2005: Rozdroże Café as Gerard
- 2004: Serce gór as Gabin
- 2004: Out of Reach
- 2004: Alarm für Cobra 11 – Die Autobahnpolizei in episode 'Friends in Need' as Russian weapon merchant
- 2003: Warszawa
- 2003: The Foreigner as Scar Face
- 2002: D.I.L. as Zubiec
- 2002: To tu, to tam as Pan Marian
- 2002: E=mc² as "Śledź"
- 2002: Sfora as inspector Walas
- 2002: As
- 2002: Rób swoje, ryzyko jest twoje as Mielona
- 2002: Całkiem spora apokalipsa
- 2002: The Hexer (The Witcher, 2002) as Sorel
- 2001: The Hexer (The Witcher, 2001) as Sorel
- 2001: Requiem
- 2000: Chłopaki nie płaczą as Grucha
- 2000: Pierwszy milion as "Morda", Kajzar's man
- 2000: Rancid Aluminium
- 2000: To my as policeman
- 2000: Cud purymowy as Waldek
- 1999: Jakub kłamca as SS officer
- 1999: Pan Tadeusz as Moskala's officer
- 1999: Ostatnia misja as "Sztych" (not named in cast)
- 1998: Amok as bandit
- 1998: Małżowina as policeman
- 1998: Rider of the Flames as corporal (not named in main cast)
- 1997: Kiler as UOP agent
- 1997: Krok as general
- 1997: Our God's Brother as beggar
- 1997: Polowanie as guard
- 1996: Wirus as UOP agent
- 1995: Gracze as Misza
- 1995: Milles, Les as prisoner with newspaper
- 1995: Prowokator as gendarme
- 1995: Pułkownik Kwiatkowski as guard
- 1995: Tato as Goryl
- 1995: Ekstradycja
- 1994: Psy II: Ostatnia krew
- 1994: Oczy niebieskie as guard on airport
- 1994: Szczur
- 1994: Ptaszka
- 1994: Miasto prywatne as "Kaczor"
- 1994: Detektyw i śmierć (Detective y la muerte, El)
- 1993: Łowca. Ostatnie starcie as conductor
- 1993: Kraj Świata as sleepy store assistant (not named in cast)
- 1992: Białe małżeństwo (not named in cast)
- 1992: Enak
- 1992: Pierścionek z orłem w koronie as Ukrainian, who was rapping Wiśka
- 1992: Sprawa kobiet (Violeur Impuni, Le) as Sylvie's guard
- 1991: Cynga as doctor
- 1991: Dziecko szczęścia
- 1991: Głos
- 1991: Panny i wdowy
- 1990: Zima w Lizbonie (Invierno en Lisboa, El)
- 1989: Ostatni dzwonek

=== Voice cast ===
- 2025: Zootopia 2 as Finnick
- 2025: 1670 as Andrzej Kmicic
- 2018: Thronebreaker: The Witcher Tales as Nilfgaardian General
- 2018: Gwent: The Witcher Card Game as The Usurper, Vrygheff, Vissegerd, Cutup Lackey
- 2016: Zootopia as Finnick
- 2015: The Witcher 3: Wild Hunt as Letho of Gulet, Vserad, Sverre
- 2011: The Witcher 2: Assassins of Kings as Letho of Gulet
- 2008: SpongeBob SquarePants as Mr. Krabs
- 2001: Shrek as The Big Bad Wolf
