= Missing You (2025 TV series) =

2025 television series

- Also known as: Harlan Coben's Missing You
- Genre: Thriller
- Created by: Victoria Asare-Archer
- Based on: Missing You by Harlan Coben
- Written by: Victoria Asare-Archer; Sumerah Srivastay
- Directed by: Nimer Rashed; Isher Sahota
- Starring: Rosalind Eleazar
- Countries of origin: United Kingdom; United States
- Original language: English
- No. of series: 1
- No. of episodes: 5

Production
- Executive producers: Harlan Coben; Nicola Shindler; Richard Fee; Victoria Asare-Archer; Danny Brocklehurst
- Producer: Guy Hescott
- Running time: 41–46 minutes
- Production companies: Quay Street Productions; Final Twist Productions

Original release
- Network: Netflix
- Release: 1 January 2025

Missing You (titled onscreen as Harlan Coben's Missing You) is a thriller television miniseries made for streaming service Netflix, adapted from the novel of the same name by Harlan Coben, who acts as executive producer on the series. It was released on 1 January 2025.

== Premise ==
Detective Inspector Kat Donovan discovers her "missing" fiancé on a dating application, over a decade since his disappearance.

== Cast ==
=== Main ===
- Rosalind Eleazar as Detective Inspector Kat Donovan, the lead detective on a case involving missing persons that happens to overlap with her past
- Richard Armitage as Detective Chief Inspector Ellis Stagger, Kat's boss
- Marc Warren as Monte LeBurne, a convicted killer who has confessed to Clint's murder and is dying in prison of cancer
- Samantha Spiro (Note: Appears in one or two episodes, but is credited amongst the main cast.) as Nurse Sally Steiner, a prison nurse for Monte
- Steve Pemberton as Titus Monroe, a psychopathic dog-breeder who is secretly also the leader of a dangerous criminal operation
- Rudi Dharmalingam as Rishi Magari, a man reported missing who is captured by Titus's criminal operation and Kat's team are looking for
- Mary Malone as Aqua Vanech, Kat's friend and Josh's former flatmate, and a yoga teacher
- Jessica Plummer as Stacey Embalo, Kat's friend and a private investigator
- Brigid Zengeni as Odette Donovan, Kat's mother and Clint's wife
- Catherine Ayers as Nia Emine, Kat's subordinate police colleague
- Charlie Hamblett as Charlie Pitts, Kat's subordinate police colleague
- Simon Kunz as Detective Terrance "Terry" Khol, Flo's husband and a family friend of the Donovans who worked with Clint
- Matt Jay-Willis as Darryl, a man who Kat meets on a date
- Jo Martin as Tessie Sewell, a friend of Odette's and former colleague of Clint's
- Naomi Wirthner as Florence "Flo" Khol, Terry's wife
- Lisa Faulkner as Dana Fells, Brendan's mother who is thought to have gone missing
- Oscar Kennedy as Brendan Fells, a nineteen-year-old who is looking for his mother Dana that he believes went missing
- Ashley Walters as Josh Buchanan / Reggie Cross, Kat's fiancé, a journalist who went "missing" 11 years prior to the beginning of the series and matches with her on a dating application in the present
- Lenny Henry as Clint Donovan, Kat's father and Odette's husband, a police officer who was murdered 11 years prior to the beginning of the series
- James Nesbitt as Dominic Calligan, a powerful crime boss who is believed to be connected to Clint's murder

=== Recurring ===
- GK Barry as Vanessa / Catalina, a woman who Rishi was in a relationship with
- Felix Garcia Guyer as Reynaldo, Titus's henchman and enforcer
- Kieran Burton as Clement / Clem, another employee of Titus's criminal operation
- Amelie Dokubo as Sadie Cross, the apparent secret daughter of Josh

=== Guest ===
- Alice Offley as Tamsin Salter, a prison officer
- Bo Poraj as Jim Mattson, the father of a family who are seeking to adopt a dog from Titus
- Lucy Lowe as Ellie Mattson, the mother of a family who are seeking to adopt a dog from Titus
- Jackie Knowles as Raya Stagger
- Alex Waldmann as Arthur "Arty" Bork, Brendan's uncle who manages Dana's finances
- Will Barnett as Claude, an employee of Titus's criminal operation who had Dana withdraw money from an ATM
- Stevie Abrahms / Deepica Stephen as Pia
- Geff Francis as Harvey Fox, Sadie's grandfather
- Arian Nik as Ashkan "Chewie" Chuback, a financial adviser and tech operator
- James Shenton as Leslie, a man working for Calligan
- Cyril Nri as Parker, Clint's secret lover

== Episodes ==
No.	Title	Directed by	Written by	Original release date
1	"Every Breath You Take"	Nimer Rashed	Victoria Asare-Archer	1 January 2025
Detective Inspector Kat Donovan continues to be haunted by the murder of her father Clint, a police officer, and the ghosting by her fiancé Josh Buchanan, a journalist, 11 years earlier. In the present, Kat inexplicably matches with Josh on a dating application called Melody Cupid and reluctantly decides to try to contact him. Josh accepts the match but later disconnects it. Kat, along with her subordinate police colleagues Nia Emine and Charlie Pitts, is working on a case of a man, Rishi Magari, who disappeared. Rishi’s car is found along with a cottage he rented for a romantic getaway. Rishi is chased by mysterious men and tries unsuccessfully to outrun them, ultimately being caught and held captive. Against official protocol, Kat manages with the help of her private investigator friend Stacey Embalo to arrange a visit into prison for herself, in order to create one last opportunity to talk with the man, Monte LeBurne, who has been convicted of killing her father; Monte is dying of cancer, and his prison nurse Sally Steiner gives him a 'truth serum' under the guise of sedating him. Monte says he didn’t actually kill Clint, but just took the fall for his murder. Stacey finds Josh’s name on Monte’s visitor’s log from the day before he disappeared.
2	"With or Without You"	Nimer Rashed	Victoria Asare-Archer	1 January 2025
Kat appears at the house of Detective Chief Inspector Ellis Stagger, her boss, early the next morning with Monte’s revelation. Detective Stagger doubts Monte's story while Kat begs Stagger to visit him in prison before he dies. Brendan Fells, a nineteen-year-old, seeks out Kat with a plea to help his mother, Dana, who he claims is missing. He tells Kat that his mother went to Costa Rica with Josh and withdrew money from an ATM 10 miles off the family’s regular route to the airport; with Brendan having been led to Kat by hacking into Josh's Melody Cupid dating app messages, as well as breaking into Kat's flat looking for Josh's address and checking his mother's bank accounts. Brendan is certain something terrible has happened to his mother. Monte dies without Stagger visiting him in prison. It is revealed by Tamsin Salter, a prison officer, that Stagger accompanied Josh on his visit to Monte. When Kat confronts Stagger about his presence there, he tells her that Josh had been pushed by his boss to use his connection to the case to get a journalistic scoop on Monte, with Stagger admitting he helped Josh get inside in the hope that he would be able to find out what happened to Clint. Stagger puts Kat on leave when she reveals she cut corners to see Monte. Rishi is threatened by two men, a dog breeder and leader of a criminal operation named Titus Monroe and his henchman Reynaldo, to deposit £25,000 to a specific account or else his girlfriend, Vanessa, will be harmed. Rishi complies and is chained up in a barn stall. Later, after the transaction is flagged by police and Titus orders Rishi disposed of, Rishi attacks Reynaldo in an escape attempt against his captors, but ends up being caught, murdered and cremated in a furnace near Dana's dress – concurrently as Nia and Charlie find CCTV footage of Dana withdrawing money from an ATM. It is revealed that several other individuals are being held captive in separate stalls. After Stacey tells Stagger that they both need to tell Kat the truth about something, a flashback shows Stagger washing blood off of himself. Meanwhile, the crime boss Dominic Calligan, who was believed to have ordered Monte to carry out a hit on Clint but to have never been caught, is shown visiting Monte's grave.
3	"Never Too Much"	Nimer Rashed	Victoria Asare-Archer & Sumerah Srivastay	1 January 2025
Suspended from work, Kat visits her friend Aqua Vanech, who admits she has seen Josh twice since he vanished: a few months after he left, when he came to say goodbye and asked her not to tell Kat, and about six months ago, when he was watching Aqua's yoga class that Kat attended in the park. Stacey finds that Josh was arrested and fined after a bar fight in Scotland 11 years ago, before all official traces of him vanished. Stagger takes Nia and Charlie off the Rishi case and orders them to have no contact with Kat, but Charlie, unaware she was suspended, had already sent her the ATM footage of Dana. Kat shows Brendan, who confirms it's his mother. Brendan finds that Josh created and deleted a Facebook profile under the name "Reggie Cross", and certain details convince Kat it's him. Kat sneaks into the station to find more information, and Charlie catches and reprimands her for taking advantage of him. However, Kat sees footage showing Dana getting into a car. A taxi firm tells Kat that Dana booked a ride to the airport but cancelled, saying her boyfriend was sending a Bentley. At Titus's dog-breeding farm, a business cover for his criminal operation, his driver Claude admits he stopped at an ATM and had Dana withdraw £500. Titus kills Claude for slipping up and has him cremated. Meanwhile, Brendan finds that £250,000 has left his mother's savings. After phoning his uncle Arthur "Arty" Bork, who manages her money, he is attacked and his phone is stolen. Kat and Brendan confront Arthur, who says Dana is fine, spoke to him the day before, sent the money to a Swiss account for a dream home, and is engaged to Josh. Charlie decides to help Kat against Stagger's orders. It's revealed that Dana never took her flight, and the Bentley's plate belongs to a man who owns a Ford Focus and is on Machu Picchu, so it was cloned. Kat asks Charlie to rerun an unidentified second fingerprint on Clint's murder weapon. At a christening for Nancy, the granddaughter of Kat's family friend and fellow detective who worked with her father, Detective Terrance "Terry" Khol, and his wife Florence / Flo, Kat tells Terry that Monte said he only took the fall, but Terry insists Monte killed Clint. Stagger discloses to Kat that Clint worked for Calligan and was killed when he wanted out. Kat confronts her mother Odette, who confirms she knew and that Clint was having an affair, but still defends him. Charlie tells Kat that Josh's Facebook profile was set up by a nine-year-old girl, and a girl named Sadie is shown in her bedroom with pictures of Josh, appearing to be his daughter. Police DC (Detective Constable) Glass calls Kat to inform her that Brendan's attacker is in custody, revealed to be Aqua. Stagger deletes Charlie's request to analyse the fingerprint. Dana is shown held captive at Titus's farm, alive.
4	"Don't You Forget About Me"	Isher Sahota	Victoria Asare-Archer	1 January 2025
In a flashback, Josh shows Aqua the spot where he plans to propose to Kat and the ring he's going to give her. In the present, Kat questions Aqua about attacking Brendan. Aqua says she followed him leaving Kat's flat, overheard him calling Josh dangerous, panicked and took his phone, with police tracking it to her house. Aqua insists Josh had no involvement and that he gave up everything for Kat, while she has flashes of memories of a door being hit by someone. Stacey admits she confronted Josh in the park, telling him to leave Kat alone. Kat asks Tessie Sewell, a friend of Odette's and former colleague of Clint's, about Clint's affair, and she gives her the name "Parker". Charlie tells Kat that financial adviser and tech operator Ashkan "Chewie" Chuback filed a suspicious activity report on the Swiss account Dana paid into. The account is revealed to belong to Rishi Magari, who met Vanessa on Melody Cupid. A reverse image search showed her photo belongs to a cam girl, Catalina, who says she never spoke to Rishi. Kat and Charlie conclude Rishi and Dana were catfished, both being widowers; and that Josh is uninvolved in the scam, with his photo stolen for it. Kat still wants to find Josh. Charlie suggests an AI tool for matching writing style, and Kat uses it to find a newsletter called "The Honest Aspect", recognising a phrase herself that Josh said to her. Stacey traces its payments to a PO box registered to Reggie Cross. At Titus's farm, he and Reynaldo press Dana about her son Brendan's trust fund, which she can't access without his signature. Titus learns that his Swiss account has been frozen. His team shows him that Kat recognised the photo of Josh used on their scam Melody Cupid dating profile, and delivered a police press conference about Josh, by his real name, and the other missing people. He tells Reynaldo to find her address, planning an assassination. Kat goes to the PO box, leading her to a house by a lake where a man denies knowing Josh or Reggie, and she notices a girl playing by the water who she recognises from a photo as the child who set up Josh's Facebook profile. Kat is suddenly captured by a man named Leslie and taken to a museum to meet Calligan. He denies having Clint killed and claims that violent stories about him are myths. He suggests a police officer killed Clint, covered it up and arranged for Monte's confession. Kat asks about Parker, and Calligan promises to help find the person in exchange for a détente. Meanwhile, just as Titus is planning to execute her, Dana tries to escape the barn. One of the dogs brings her a plank of wood, which she uses to hit Clement / Clem, one of Titus's men, before running away. Kat is returned to the lake house and asks the girl, Sadie, about Reggie Cross and Josh Buchanan, before Josh emerges and reveals himself to Kat.
5	"Chain Reaction"	Isher Sahota	Victoria Asare-Archer	1 January 2025
At the lake house, Kat asks Josh about Dana, but he says he's never heard of her. Sadie is revealed to have set up the Facebook profile because she thought her father was lonely after her mother died a few years ago, with Josh living with Sadie and her grandfather, the man that denied knowing Josh. Kat tells Josh she knows he visited Monte and learned Clint was corrupt, and Josh says the truth would've broken her. Kat is resistant to reconnect with Josh. Kat confronts Stagger and questions whether he arranged Monte's confession. Stagger admits he paid him to confess in order to protect Kat from learning Clint worked for Calligan, having promised Clint to look after her. Near Titus's farm, his men hunt for Dana, and Clem yells out to her to volunteer herself, threatening to kill her son. While staking out Kat's flat, Titus and Reynaldo spot Brendan arriving there looking for her, and recognize him as Dana's son from a photo on her Melody Cupid dating profile. Obtaining his number from Dana's phone, Titus phones Brendan and coerces him into coming to a van, claiming his mother is there and he will kill her after a short time. Dana sneaks back into Titus's establishment and finds a phone to warn Brendan to run, but he is grabbed by Titus's men anyway, and the van drives off as Kat arrives too late. Dana is then found and attacked by Clem and kills him with an axe she found at Titus's farm. Kat, Charlie and Nia trace the van through farmland. It was spotted at a convention center during a dog show, and a woman had reported being stalked by a dog breeder, Titus, after trying to adopt a puppy. Kat and Nia drive to the farm. There, Titus holds Brendan hostage and orders the farm burned with seven captives still in the stables. Nia calls for fire and ambulance support, and Kat goes in herself rather than wait for backup. Dana frees the other captives using the axe, and rallies them to overpower and kill Reynaldo. Titus shoots Brendan in the knee to force Dana to come out, demanding the return of his prisoners. Kat intervenes and kills Titus with Brendan's help, and Brendan and Dana are reunited. Calligan tells Kat he's found Parker, who was Clint's secret male partner for 14 years. Visiting him at his home, Parker tells Kat that Calligan blackmailed Clint into working for him, and that Clint ended his relationship with Parker shortly before the night he died. Kat finds Josh waiting outside her home, and they spend the night together. The next morning Charlie tells her the partial fingerprint matches a record from a Scottish bar fight, which is Josh's. Josh confesses that the night Clint died, Aqua had seen him with Parker, leading Clint to chase Aqua, who called Josh worriedly after arriving home. In a desperate move, Clint asked Stagger for Aqua's address, went to her flat and aggressively banged on the door demanding to be let in, begged her to keep quiet, and then physically attacked her and knocked her knife away after Kat's phone call came through and he believed Aqua was telling her about his infidelity. Josh arrived at the flat, stepped in and stabbed Clint accidentally while trying to protect Aqua, just as Stagger got there too late after sensing Clint's desperation. Clint begged them not to tell Kat or call the police. Josh wanted to call for help, but Stagger determined an ambulance would be unable to save Clint anyway. Stagger took Clint's phone and cleaned up and staged the scene to make it look like Monte murdered him, planting Monte's fingerprints on the knife with Clint's blood on it at Monte's house and arranging the confession, though slipping up by accidentally leaving a partial fingerprint of Josh's on it too. Josh says he left because he couldn't face Kat while keeping the truth hidden from her, but returned because he missed her. Though Kat is in shock, she reluctantly decides to forgive him and attempt to move on together.

== Production ==
In January 2024, it was announced that Netflix would be adapting Missing You by Harlan Coben, who acts as executive producer on the series through his company Final Twist Productions.

The series was produced by Quay Street Productions. It is written by Victoria Asare-Archer and directed by Nimer Rashed and Isher Sahota, with filmmaker Sean Spencer initially having signed on to direct as well but dropping out during production. Executive producers along with Coben are Nicola Shindler, Richard Fee, Asare-Archer, and Danny Brocklehurst. Guy Hescott is the producer.

The series has Rosalind Eleazar in a lead role alongside Richard Armitage, with Lenny Henry, Samantha Spiro, Steve Pemberton, Lisa Faulkner and Paul Kaye also confirmed in the cast, though Kaye's role was replaced by Marc Warren by the time of filming. Ashley Walters was seen on set in Manchester in late March 2024 and was confirmed in the cast in June 2024, along with James Nesbitt and musician Matt Willis.

Filming got underway in March 2024 with filming locations including Le Mans Crescent and Victoria Square in Bolton. Filming also took place in Manchester city centre, and Parkgate on the Wirral Peninsula.

== Release ==
The series premiered on Netflix on 1 January 2025.

== Reception ==
The review aggregator website Rotten Tomatoes reported a 48% approval rating with an average rating of 5.2/10, based on 29 critic reviews. The website's critics consensus reads, "Missing You tests the psyche but leaves one with the lingering effects of a soapy, twisty, and slippery miniseries." Metacritic, which uses a weighted average, assigned a score of 57 out of 100 based on 13 critics, indicating "mixed or average" reviews.

The Guardian found the first episodes repetitive, but that the series improved in later ones.

== Viewership ==
According to data from Showlabs, Missing You ranked third on Netflix in the United States during the week of 6–12 January 2025, placing among the platform’s most watched titles in that period.
