= Maria Dębska =

Polish actress (born 1991)

- Dębska in 2026
- Born: May 22, 1991 (age 35); Warsaw, Poland
- Occupation: Actress
- Years active: 2010–present
- Spouse: Marcin Bosak (2020–2022)
- Mother: Kinga Dębska

Maria Dębska (born May 22, 1991) is a Polish actress. She received the Gdynia Film Festival Award for Best Actress and a nomination for the Polish Academy Award for Best Actress for her performance as Kalina Jędrusik in the biographical musical drama film Autumn Girl (2021).

== Life and career ==
Dębska was born and raised in Warsaw and studied at the Academy of Music, Łódź before graduating from the Łódź Film School in 2017. Her mother is film director Kinga Dębska. She began her career appearing in episodes of television series such as Na dobre i na złe and Father Matthew. From 2014 to 2017 she was a regular cast member in the soap opera Barwy szczęścia and from 2017 to 2019 in the drama series Wartime Girls. From 2017 to 2020 she played one of leads in the crime series, W rytmie serca. She received Telekamery Award nomination for Best Actress in 2019.

Dębska made her big screen debut appearing in the 2015 comedy-drama film, These Daughters of Mine starring Agata Kulesza, and later co-starred in the horror film, Demon. In 2018 she starred alongside Agata Kulesza in the drama film, Playing Hard receiving International Festival of Independent Cinema Off Camera Award for cast performance. The following year she played Aleksandra Piłsudska in the biographical film, Piłsudski. In 2021 she starred as Kalina Jędrusik in the biographical musical drama film, Autumn Girl. For this role, Dębska won Gdynia Film Festival Award for Best Actress and received Polish Academy Award for Best Actress nomination. The following year she starred in the romantic comedy film, Letters to Santa 5. In 2024 she starred in the SkyShowtime first original series Deadly Ties, and in 2025 in the Netflix miniseries, Just One Look, a psychological thriller.

== Filmography ==
=== Film ===
Year	Title	Role	Notes
2015	These Daughters of Mine	Zuzia	
2015	Demon	Hana	
2017	The Reconciliation	Girl from Pharmacy	
2017	Silent Night	Jolka	
2018	Plan B	Mirek's girlfriend	Voice
2018	Playing Hard	Magda	International Festival of Independent Cinema Off Camera Award for Best Cast Performance
2018	Bad Luck Good Love	Natalia	
2019	Piłsudski	Aleksandra Piłsudska	
2019	Black Mercedes	Aneta Landau	
2021	Autumn Girl	Kalina Jędrusik	Gdynia Film Festival Award for Best Actress; Nominated — Polish Academy Award for Best Actress; Nominated — Zbigniew Cybulski Award
2022	Letters to Santa 5	Majka	
2023	Mr. Car and the Knights Templar	Karen Petersen	
2026	The Doll	Kazimiera Wasowska	
2026	Przez sciane	Wieslawa Pajdak	

=== Television ===
Year	Title	Role	Notes
2010	Na dobre i na złe	Pianist	Episode: "Medyczny trojkat"
2012	L for Love	Friend	2 episodes
2014	Father Matthew	Paulina Wislicka	Episode: "Kurtka"
2014	Komisarz Alex	Agata Łuczak	2 episodes
2014-2017	Barwy szczęścia	Jaga	Series regular, 56 episodes
2018	Blinded by the Lights	employee	Episode: "1.1"
2017-2019	Wartime Girls	Zosia Joachim	21 episodes
2019-2020	Our Century	Róża Freilich-Krönenberg	5 episodes
2017-2020	W rytmie serca	Weronika Nowacka	Series regular, 75 episodes
2020	Solid Gold	Sylwia Czekaj	3 episodes
2021	Osaczony	Justyna Wilkoń	Series regular, 6 episodes
2022	Powrót	Malwina	Series regular, 6 episodes
2021-2022	Kitchen	Wiktoria Gonczar	Series regular, 40 episodes
2023	When's the Wedding?	Wanda Mazur	Series regular, 8 episodes
2024-2025	Deadly Ties	Anna Serafin	Series regular, 6 episodes
2025	Just One Look	Greta Rembiewska	Series regular, 6 episodes
TBA	Pionek	Anna Serafin	Series regular
