= Misty Green =

2026 film by Chris Rock

- Theatrical release poster
- Directed by: Chris Rock
- Written by: Chris Rock
- Produced by: Peter Rice; Chris Rock; David Worthen Brooks; Victoria Thomas
- Starring: Rosalind Eleazar; Adam Driver; Daniel Kaluuya; Anna Kendrick; Topher Grace; Chris Rock
- Cinematography: Kira Kelly
- Edited by: Adam Dicterow
- Music by: Marcus Miller
- Production company: A24
- Distributed by: A24
- Release dates: September 12, 2026 (TIFF); October 9, 2026 (United States)
- Running time: 103 minutes
- Country: United States
- Language: English
- Budget: $5 million
- Box office: $160,023

Misty Green is a 2026 American comedy-drama film written and directed by Chris Rock. Starring Rosalind Eleazar, Adam Driver, Daniel Kaluuya, Anna Kendrick, Topher Grace, and Chris Rock, it follows a fading award-winning actress who revisits her past and plans to make a comeback while reconnecting with her former talent agent.

The film had its world premiere at the 2026 Toronto International Film Festival on September 12. It was theatrically released in the United States by A24 on October 9, 2026 and received mixed reviews from critics.

== Plot ==
Award-winning actress Misty Green, stuck in the throes of a fading career, revisits her past and addresses her personal demons as she tries for a comeback after reconnecting with her former talent agent.

== Cast ==
- Rosalind Eleazar as Misty Green, a fading actress attempting a comeback
- Adam Driver as Zach, a drug addicted filmmaker and Misty's friend
- Daniel Kaluuya as Jay Green, an ex-con and Misty's brother
- Anna Kendrick as Naomi, Misty's friend
- Topher Grace as Randy, Misty's former talent agent
- Chris Rock as Jordan, a director that knows Misty
- Anthony Anderson as Officer Wood
- Kelli Garner as Carol
- Amy Landecker as Celine
- Rich Sommer as Brad
- Tracie Thoms as Rhonda
- Alexandra Shipp as Bella
- Ice-T as himself
- Busta Rhymes as himself
- Necar Zadegan as Shabnam
- Carlos Jacott as Hal
- Yvonne Orji as Dr. Waples
- Nicole Ari Parker as Erika
- Tom Papa as Dr. Graham
- Lake Bell as voice of “The Bag” definition
- Spliff Star as himself

== Production ==
It was announced in November 2024 that Chris Rock was set to write and direct a film for Neon, in which he would also star. The film at the time was titled Misty Green.

In July 2025, the then-untitled film moved to A24, and began production in Los Angeles. Rosalind Eleazar was cast in the role of Misty Green, with Adam Driver, Daniel Kaluuya, and Anna Kendrick also added to the cast. Topher Grace, Anthony Anderson, Kelli Garner, Amy Landecker, and Rich Sommer joined the cast the next month. Tracie Thoms joined the cast by March 2026. Marcus Miller composed the score, his fourth collaboration with Rock after Head of State, Everybody Hates Chris, and I Think I Love My Wife.

== Release ==
Neon International is handling foreign rights, while CAA Media Finance is responsible for domestic rights.

Misty Green premiered in the Gala Presentations section of the 2026 Toronto International Film Festival on September 12. It had its U.S. premiere in the Main Slate of the 2026 New York Film Festival on September 26. It was theatrically released in the United States on October 9.

== Reception ==
=== Critical response ===
On the review aggregator website Rotten Tomatoes, the film holds an approval rating of 61%, based on 84 reviews, with an average rating of 5.7/10. The website's consensus reads: "Rosalind Eleazar is resoundingly ready for her closeup in Misty Green, a satire of stardom that's as fleeting as Hollywood fame but elevated by its marvelous central performance." Metacritic, which uses a weighted average, assigned the film a score of 67 out of 100, based on 30 critics, indicating "generally favorable" reviews.

=== Accolades ===
Award	Date of ceremony	Category	Recipient(s)	Result	Ref.
Toronto International Film Festival	September 13, 2026	TIFF Tribute Performer Award	Rosalind Eleazar	Honored	
Middleburg Film Festival	October 18, 2026	Breakthrough Actor Award	Rosalind Eleazar	Honored	
SCAD Savannah Film Festival	October 26, 2026	Breakthrough Award	Rosalind Eleazar	Honored	
Celebration of Cinema and Television	November 16, 2026	Director Award	Chris Rock	Honored	
