= Play Dead (novel) =

1990 novel by Harlan Coben

- First edition
- Author: Harlan Coben
- Language: English
- Genre: Crime novel, mystery
- Publisher: British Amer Pub Ltd
- Publication date: June 1990
- Publication place: United States
- Media type: Print (hardcover)
- Pages: 452 pp (first edition, hardback)

Play Dead is the first novel by American crime writer Harlan Coben, published in 1990.

== Plot summary ==
No sooner had supermodel Laura Ayers and Celtics star David Baskin said "I do" than tragedy struck. While honeymooning on Australia's Great Barrier Reef, David went out for a swim—and never returned. Now widowed and grieving, Laura's search for the truth will draw her into a web of lies and deception.
