= Caught (Coben novel) =

Novel by Harlan Coben

- First edition
- Author: Harlan Coben
- Language: English
- Genre: Crime thriller
- Published: 2010
- Publisher: Dutton
- Publication place: US
- ISBN: 9780525951582

Caught is the tenth stand-alone novel by American crime writer Harlan Coben. It was released in 2010.

== Plot ==
17-year-old Haley McWaid is a good girl, the pride of her suburban New Jersey family, captain of the lacrosse team, headed off to college next year with all the hopes and dreams her doting parents can pin on her. Which is why, when her mother wakes one morning to find that Haley never came home the night before, and three months quickly pass without word from the girl, the community assumes the worst.

== List of characters ==
Harlan Coben novels include many characters (too many, according to Janet Maslin). Sometimes this is confusing for the reader. This list will help to identify the characters in the novel.

=== Main characters ===
- Dan Mercer – social worker known as a friend to troubled teens / he walks into a trap of TV news program Caught in the Act
- Wendy Tynes – reporter / presenter at NTC News
- Haley McWaid – oldest daughter of Marcia and Ted McWaid / suddenly missing
- Ed Grayson – one of the fathers of families whose child that has been abused / pensioned federal Marshall
- Phil Turnball – one of Dan Mercer's flatmates at Princeton; worked at investment company, but jobless due to rumors of fraud
- Frank Tremont – police detective Essex County; early 60s nearing retirement
- Mickey Walker – Sheriff Sussex County

=== Other characters (alphabetical) ===
- Amanda Wheeler – stepdaughter of Jenna Wheeler / classmate of Haley McWaid
- Ariana Nasbro – alcoholic who killed Wendy's husband John 12 years ago
- Arthur Lemaine – ice hockey coach / brother-in-law of Ed Grayson / shot in both knees
- Charlie – 17-year-old son of Wendy
- Christa Stockwell – 40 years old / lives in home of Dean at Princeton
- Chynna – young girl in Caught in the Act
- Doug – dressed as a tennis professional
- Ed Junior "EJ" – son of Ed and Maggie
- Farley Parks – flatmate of Dan at university / candidate of Congress, but in trouble due to political sex scandal
- Flair Hickory – attorney of Dan Mercer
- Hester Crimstein – TV-judge and attorney of Ed Grayson
- Jenna Wheeler – ex-wife of Dan Mercer; since eight years remarried with:
- Jersey – Wendy's dog
- John Morrow – made Wendy pregnant at her 19th; married for five years when killed by a drunk driver Ariana Nasbro
- Kelvin Tilfer – flatmate of Dan at university / genius / psychiatric patient
- Lee Portnoi – attorney of Wendy Tynes
- Maggie – wife of Ed Grayson
- Marcia McWaid – mother of Haley, Patricia and Ryan
- Michelle Fischer – young new TV news presenter
- Noel Wheeler – surgeon
- Norm alias "Ten-a-fly" – member of Father's Club / now wannabe rapper
- Patricia McWaid – 14 years old
- Pops – father of John; (ex-) father in law of Wendy
- Ridley Barry – co-founder of Barry Brothers Trust, where Phil Turnbull has worked before he was fired
- Ryan McWaid – Nine years old
- Sherry Turnball – Phil's wife
- Steven Miciano – flatmate of Dan at university / orthopedic surgeon / accused of possession of drugs
- Ted McWaid – father of Haley, Patricia and Ryan
- Tom Stanton – young policeman / deputy sheriff
- Vic Garrett – Wendy's Boss at NTC News
- Windsor "Win" Horne Lockwood, III – secondary character in the Myron Bolitar series. While the best friend of hero Bolitar, Win would best be described as an anti-hero, being very psychopathic in nature. In Caught, Wendy calls Win for confidential information.

==== Secondary characters (alphabetical) ====
- Frederik Montagne – a high boss of the NTC Network
- Greg – son of Hal and Marilee
- Hal – married with Marilee
- Kasey – daughter of Frank Tremont, that died at 17 years of age from cancer
- Kirby Sennett – a boyfriend of Hailey McWaid
- Lawrence Cherston – Princeton jup / moderator of Princeton Facebook page
- Loren Muse – boss of Frank Tremont
- Marilee – sister of Marcia McWaid
- Mavis – secretary of Vic Garett
- Michael Wind – childhood friend of Pete Zecher
- Michelle Fischer – young new TV news presenter
- Noel Wheeler – surgeon
- Norm alias "Ten-a-fly" – member of Father's Club / now wannabe rapper
- Patricia McWaid – 14 years old
- Pete Zecher – school dean
- Pops – father of John; (ex-) father in law of Wendy
- Ridley Barry – co-founder of Barry Brothers Trust, where Phil Turnbull has worked before he was fired
- Ronal Tilfer – brother of Kelvin Tilfer
- Ryan McWaid – nine years old
- Sharon Hait – Facebook alias of Wendy Tynes
- Sherry Turnball – Phil's wife
- Stephe Slotnick – dean at Princeton
- Steven Miciano – flatmate of Dan during University / orthopedic surgeon / accused of possession of drugs
- Tara O'Neill – pathologist
- Ted McWaid – father of Haley, Patricia and Ryan
- Tom Stanton – young policeman / deputy sheriff
- Vic Garrett – Wendy's boss at NTC News

==== Dan Mercer's flatmates ====
- Phil Turnball
- Farley Parks
- Kelvin Tilfer
- Steven Miciano

==== The Fathers Club ====
- Phil Turnball
- Norm (Ten-a-Fly)
- Doug
- Owen

== Adaptation ==
Filming on a Spanish-language television adaptation for Netflix took place in Argentina in 2024.
