= Gone for Good (TV series) =

French crime drama

- Release poster
- French: Disparu à jamais
- Genre: Crime; Drama; Mystery
- Created by: David Elkaïm; Vincent Poymiro
- Based on: Gone for Good by Harlan Coben
- Starring: Finnegan Oldfield; Nicolas Duvauchelle; Guillaume Gouix
- Country of origin: France
- Original language: French
- No. of seasons: 1
- No. of episodes: 5

Original release
- Network: Netflix
- Release: 13 August 2021

Gone for Good (French: Disparu à jamais) is a 2021 French-language television series created by David Elkaïm and Vincent Poymiro based on Harlan Coben's 2002 novel, Gone for Good. The series stars Finnegan Oldfield, Nicolas Duvauchelle and Guillaume Gouix.

== Cast ==
- Finnegan Oldfield as Guillaume Lucchesi
- Nicolas Duvauchelle as Fred Lucchesi
- Guillaume Gouix as Da Costa
- Garance Marillier as Inès Kasmi / Sonia
- Nailia Harzoune as Judith Conti/Nora
- Tómas Lemarquis as Ostertag
- Grégoire Colin as Kesler
- Jacques Bonnaffé as M. Lucchesi
- Ambre Hasaj as Inès Kasmi child
- Bojesse Christopher as Jo Ostertag
- Julie Moulier as Maéva Lucchesi
- Sonia Bonny Eboumbou as Awa
- Mila Ayache as Alice
- Maxime Gemin as Fred Lucchesi teenager
- Martin Laurent as Guillaume child
- Sean Guégan as Stan
- Raphaël Thiéry as Ostertag's Father
- Julie-Anne Roth as Florence Lucchesi
- Olivier Fazio as BAC cop

== Release ==
Gone for Good was released on 13 August 2021 on Netflix.
