= Hold Tight (novel) =

2008 thriller novel by Harlan Coben

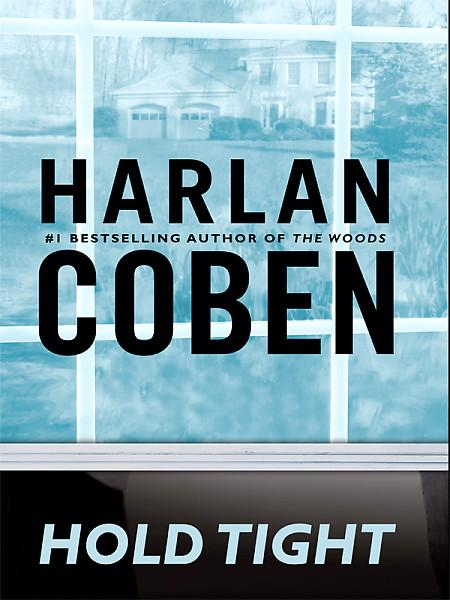
- Author: Harlan Coben
- Language: English
- Genre: Crime fiction, thriller
- Publisher: Thorndike Press (hardback) (US); Orion Books (hardback) (UK); Signet (hardback) (US), Orion Books (paperback) (UK)
- Publication date: April 15, 2008
- Publication place: United States
- Media type: Print (hardback & paperback)
- Pages: 321 pp (hardback)
- ISBN: 978-1-4104-0567-8 (TP; hardback), 978-0-7528-8521-6 (OB; hardback), 978-0-7528-9115-6 (OB; paperback), 978-0-451-22650-1 (Sig; paperback)

Hold Tight is a 2008 thriller and the ninth stand-alone novel by American crime writer Harlan Coben. The story deals with problems of parental controls, teenage suicide, children independence and abuse of prescribed drugs. It features several characters who are equally important. It was moderately well received by critics. It debuted simultaneously as a No. 1 New York Times best seller and a Times of London best seller. A Polish language miniseries adaptation was developed for Netflix in 2022.

== Plot ==
The story is introduced with the characters Marianne, Nash, and Pietra. Pietra tricks Marianne by drugging her, which leads to Nash brutally beating Marianne to death, his last words to her being: "Tell Cassandra I love her." They remove her clothes, then dress her up to look like a prostitute and toss her body in a dumpster.

The action switches to Tia and Mike Baye who never imagined they'd become spying, overprotective parents. But their sixteen-year-old son Adam has been unusually distant and aloof lately, and after the recent suicide of his classmate and close friend Spencer Hill (who took vodka and tablets on his school's roof in the night and died), they can't help but worry. They install a spy program on Adam's computer and within days they are jolted by a strange message to their son from a correspondent known only as CeeJay8115: "Just stay quiet and all safe."

The detective investigating Marianne's murder, Loren Muse, realizes that Marianne is not a prostitute and that someone has gone to great lengths to try to fool the authorities. However, Marianne's face has been so badly mutilated that it is impossible for anyone to identify her.

Susan and Dante Loriman meet with their son's (Lucas) doctor (Mike Baye) only to be told Lucas urgently needs a kidney transplant. Neither parent is a suitable match and with some investigating, Mike finds out that Dante is not Lucas’s biological father.

Meanwhile, browsing through an online memorial for her son, Betsy Hill is struck by one photo in particular that appears to have been taken on the night of Spencer's death and that he wasn't alone. She thinks it's Adam Baye standing just outside the camera's range. She confronts him and asks about the photo, but he flees.

The daughter of Marianne and Guy, Yasmin, is being bullied at school because her teacher (Joe Lewiston) commented on her facial hair in front of the class. Yasmin shows her only friend Jill Baye (Mike and Tia's daughter) her father's (Guy) gun, which is already loaded and hidden in a drawer in their house. She tells Jill how she dreams of getting revenge on Mr. Lewiston.

Worried about their son’s safety, Mike tells Adam he must attend a hockey game with Mike's friend Mo. This is a diversion to try to avoid the party referred to in an email Mike and Tia found on their son's computer a few days earlier, the party claims that there will be alcohol and drugs served. Adam is not around when his father comes to pick him up to attend the hockey game, and Mo tells Mike how to use the GPS on Adam's phone to track him. Mike ends up following him into a dangerous part of the Bronx. He starts to chase after what looks to be one of Adam's friends, but is then confronted and severely beaten by an unknown group. He winds up in hospital and still hasn't found his son.

Reba Cordova is Nash's next victim, and she is likewise beaten to death, for reasons still unknown to the reader. Before killing her he also told her the same thing Nash told Marianne: "Tell Cassandra I love her." Cassandra is revealed to have died a few years ago due to cancer, and was deeply loved by Nash. Cassandra is the sister of Joe Lewiston, and had another brother named Curtis, who was murdered in an assumed robbery.

Mike's professional partner Ilene Goldfarb confronts Susan to find the Lucas’s real father, as he could be a potential kidney donor. Susan tells her that she was raped, and that it was impossible for her to contact him to ask if he could be tested as a potential donor. Later the readers find out that the reason that her rapist cannot be contacted is because Susan killed her attacker. She confides that the murder was set up to make officials think the cause of the murder was most likely a robbery, which leads the reader to believe that Curtis Lewiston is the rapist.

The events start to come together by the end of the book as the connections of the murders. Adam's disappearance, Spencer's apparent suicide, and the need for a good donor for Susan's son are explained, and the origin of all of the mayhem is revealed.

== Characters ==
- Michael "Mike" Baye - transplant surgeon, Tia's husband, and Adam and Jill's father
- Tia Baye - lawyer, Mike's wife, and Adam and Jill's mother
- Adam Baye - 16-year-old boy who has a mysterious problem, Mike and Tia's son, and Jill's elder brother
- Jill Baye - 11-year-old girl, Yasmin's close friend, Mike and Tia's daughter, and Adam's younger sister
- Yasmin Novak - 11-year-old girl, Jill's close friend
- Marianne Gillespie - Yasmin's mother and Guy's ex-wife
- Guy Novak - Yasmin's father and Marianne's ex-husband
- Spencer Hill - Adam's close friend
- DJ Huff - Adam's friend
- Ron and Betsy Hill - Spencer's parents
- Neil Cordova - Reba's husband
- Reba Cordova - Neil's wife and Marianne's close friend
- Susan Loriman - Lucas's mother
- Dante Loriman - Susan's husband
- Mo - Mike's close friend
- Anthony - bouncer
- Curtis Lewiston - Joe Lewiston's brother
- Joe Lewiston - primary school teacher
- Nash - Cassandra's widower and Joe's brother-in-law
- Pietra - former actress who becomes Nash's partner
- Rosemary Mcdevitt - owner of Club Jaguar
