= Fade Away (novel) =

Novel by Harlan Coben

- First edition
- Author: Harlan Coben
- Language: English
- Series: A Myron Bolitar Novel
- Genre: Mystery, thriller
- Publisher: Dell
- Publication date: 1997
- Publication place: United States
- Media type: Print (hardback & paperback)
- Pages: 368

Fade Away is a novel by author Harlan Coben. It is the third novel in his series of a crime solver and sports agent named Myron Bolitar.

== Plot summary ==
Fade Away is a novel featuring Myron Bolitar, a sports agent, hired by the New Jersey Dragons to find a missing basketball star. Myron and his team of associates, work together to puzzle out the disappearance of Greg Downing, drawing Myron into danger, both physical and emotional.

Myron Bolitar is a sports agent and sometimes investigator, called by Clip Arnstein, the owner of the New Jersey Dragons. Clip's star player is missing and he wants Myron to find him. Greg Downing had been Myron's rival throughout their youth and college days. Both had been drafted to play professional basketball, but Greg is the only one that made it. Myron's knee had been injured in what was believed to be a freak accident on the court, and he had never played professionally. Clip wants Myron to take Greg's place on the team, feeling that the other players would be more open with him rather than an investigator. Myron is reluctant yet excited at the same time. Having never had the opportunity to play pro-ball, he is anxious to know if he can make it with the Dragons.

Myron investigates Greg's disappearance with the help of his closest friend, Win. The two men discover a mysterious woman had left a message on Greg's answering machine to arrange a meeting the night he vanished. Following leads, Myron discovers the woman has been murdered, and Greg is the main suspect. Initially believing that Greg had a drug problem, Myron discovers that the woman had in fact been blackmailing Greg, though he does not know why. Greg also has a large gambling problem, and Myron thinks that may be what the blackmail involves. Further investigation reveals that the mysterious woman is in fact a fugitive. A member of the Sixties radical group The Raven Brigade, Liz Gorman had contacted Greg after the group had robbed a bank in Arizona several months previously.

The investigation takes several twists and turns, involving custody battles between Greg and his wife Emily, a former girlfriend of Myron's, and the assistance of Audrey Wilson, the sports reporter that covers the New Jersey Dragons. Audrey uncovers the real reason that Myron is on the team, and convinces him that the two of them can work together to find Greg. In exchange for sharing information, Audrey agrees not to release the story about Greg disappearing. Audrey discovers that Greg had hired a private investigator to follow Emily. Myron uncovers a video tape of Emily and Maggie Mason, a woman known as Thumper, having sex. Mason has close ties to the team. Myron believes Emily had been set up and can understand her extreme anger at Greg.

The murder weapon is discovered in Greg's house, and other evidence that had been in the house vanishes. It is clear that someone is trying to frame Greg for murder, while another person may be trying to protect him. In another development, the blackmailers contact Myron and offer to sell him the information they had offered Greg. Events come to a head when Myron meets up with the leader of the Raven Brigade, Cole Whiteman. He admits that he and Liz Gorman had indeed been blackmailing Greg, but will not reveal with what. Leaving him, Myron meets up with Audrey, and receives a phone call from the blackmailer. The two travel to a remote location and meet with a man in a ski mask. Audrey shoots the man, claiming he was going to kill Myron. Myron confronts her. Audrey had killed Gorman to protect Greg and their unborn child. It had been Audrey that cleaned up the evidence at Greg's house, leaving the murder weapon planted by Emily, as it had not been discovered. The blackmailer at the scene was in fact a homicide detective, part of the set up to catch Audrey.

Myron returns to the Arena to confront Clip Arnstein and is handed an audio cassette. On the tape is evidence that Myron's injury so many years ago was not an accident after all. Greg had paid another player to hurt Myron. Though he had not intended for the injury to be career ending, Greg was angry at Myron for having a one-night stand with Emily the night before their wedding. Arnstein had known about the tape from the beginning and could think of no other way to tell Myron. Arnstein wanted Myron to have closure.

Myron realizes that though his basketball career was ended, he had created a life for himself, a good life with friends and people that love him. Despite his loss of a career in basketball, he had moved on, becoming successful. Myron still mourned for the chances that he had missed in life, but cherished the chances he had been given.

== Major themes ==
=== Friendship ===
Friendship is a strong theme in the novel. The deep friendship of Myron and Windsor Horne Lockwood III is clearly evident. Myron can depend on Win, no questions asked. The two had met in college, and no matter which directions their lives turn, the friendship remains. Myron is also close friends with Esperanza Diaz, his assistant at MB SportsReps. Myron and Esperanza understand each other in the way that brothers and sisters do.

Win and Esperanza both know and understand Myron well, sometimes better than he understands himself. When Myron is given the chance to play professional basketball again, both refuse to attend the games, unwilling to see Myron suffer the loss of the game again. Esperanza feels that Myron will give himself to the game completely, and the loss will crush him. Win has always felt that Myron's injury was intentional, and had never followed up at Myron's request. Still, the thought of seeing Myron on the court would be too much of a reminder for Win to bear. Myron's friendship with Win and Esperanza is enduring and trusting. The three are free to express themselves honestly, without worry of offending each other or losing the true friendship that they share.

=== Deception ===
The central plot of Fade Away, is the blackmail of Greg Downing. The blackmailers themselves practice deception, by trying to blackmail many people with the same information. Greg Downing had paid for someone to injure Myron, and the Raven Brigade had discovered this information when they had robbed a bank in Arizona. Clip Arnstein also practices deception when he hires Myron to find Greg. Though Clip is aware of the blackmail, and the proof that Myron's injury was intentional, he does not reveal this to Myron at the outset. Clip is unsure of how to tell Myron the truth, so he orchestrates Myron's discovery of the tape revealing the original plot by Greg.

Audrey Wilson's deception is the most dramatic. Though she tells Myron that she is working with him to locate Greg simply as a guarantee to be first with the story, in reality she is also looking for Greg. The blackmail scheme had driven Greg into hiding, and Audrey, in order to protect her husband and unborn child had killed the blackmailer, Liz Gorman. By working with Myron to find Greg, Audrey is also keeping track of the investigation, covering her tracks and protecting Greg when he becomes the prime suspect

=== Loyalty ===
Many characters exhibit loyalty throughout the novel. Myron's friends, Esperanza and Win are extremely loyal to him. Though Esperanza shrouds her caring in sarcasm and humor, she is a bit like a guard dog, always watching to make sure Myron is safe. Esperanza deeply dislikes Myron's girlfriend Jessica, because Jessica had left him and broke his heart years before. Even though Jessica has returned and Myron seems to be happy, Esperanza still refers to her as 'the bitch.' Myron does not like the name, but accepts that Esperanza loves him and still hurts for the times that he had suffered. The fact that Esperanza and Win will not attend any of the games Myron plays in also demonstrates loyalty. They are aware that he had been devastated when he was injured and forced to give up the game he loves.

Myron is deeply loyal to his girlfriend Jessica. Though Jessica had left him a few years earlier, they had gotten back together. Myron believes in the love they have for each other, even though Esperanza has made it clear that she does not like or trust Jessica, Myron exhibits his loyalty to Esperanza, by allowing her to feel the way that she does, without getting angry at her outbursts.

Perhaps the oddest loyalty throughout Fade Away, is Myron's loyalty to Greg. Myron feels a bond with Greg due to the competitive nature of their relationship in their youth and college years. Because of this loyalty, Myron works throughout the novel to find Greg, as well as prove his innocence in the murder of Liz Gorman. This loyalty is misplaced, as Greg is the person who had caused Myron's injury ten years ago, ending his career in professional basketball.

== Setting ==
The novel takes place in many different locations in the New York metropolitan area. The Continental Arena, home of the New Jersey Dragons is located in New Jersey, as is the main character, Myron Bolitar's hometown of Livingston. Myron's office is located in the same building as Locke-Horn Securities in Manhattan. A central location in the novel is the Meadowlands Arena, the home of the New Jersey Dragons, where Myron plays professional basketball for the first time. Much of the novel takes place within the city of New York as well as Greenwich Village. The storyline follows Myron Bolitar as he searches for Greg Downing. Myron travels throughout different areas of the city and the outlying suburbs in his search for Greg, as well as trying to find the truth behind the murder of Liz Gorman.

== Style ==
=== Point of view ===
The novel is written in the third person, omniscient. For the most part, Myron Bolitar is the main focus, however there are brief passages where his assistant Esperanza is highlighted. Myron, as the main character, is the center of the majority of the novel, however Esperanza is highlighted in order to bring important facts to the readers attention.

== Characters ==
=== Myron Bolitar ===
Myron Bolitar is a 32-year-old sports agent and owner of MB SportsReps. Myron lives in his parents basement, but spends most nights at the apartment of his girlfriend Jessica. A former basketball player, Myron was destined to be a star with the Celtics when a career ending injury forced him to give up the game he loved. Myron moved on with his life, getting his law degree and starting the agency, but never lost his love for the game or his desire to play.

Myron gets drawn back into the game of basketball when he agrees to help Clip Arnstein find Greg Downing, one of the stars of the New Jersey Dragons. Playing professional basketball is both a thrill for Myron, and difficult at the same time. As much as Myron loves the game, he comes to realize that he does not have what it takes to play pro ball.

Following leads into Greg's disappearance, Myron discovers that Greg is being blackmailed. Though at first Myron believes that the blackmail scheme involves Greg's gambling problem, it is revealed that the information the blackmailers possess is much more personal. Ten years earlier, Myron had been injured in what he believed to be a freak accident on the court. In truth, the injury had been set up by Greg Downing in retaliation for Myron having sex with Greg's wife the day before their wedding.

=== Windsor Horne Lockwood III ===
Windsor Horne Lockwood III is Myron's best friend. President of the investment firm Locke-Horn Securities, Win is somewhat of an enigma. Wealthy and intelligent, he looks the part of the aristocratic blue blood, however, he is also a loner, letting very few people into his inner circle of friends. Win is very loyal to those whom he considers his friends, Myron being the closest friend he has. The two men had been roommates in college, and have been best friend ever since. Myron runs his sports agency, and Win runs the family firm, and both have been known to work for the FBI undercover.

Win stays to himself for the most part and has no close relationships other than Myron. Raised in a world of power and prestige, Win seems not to have developed the personality to become close to people, preferring his lifestyle of one-night stands with no strings attached. Win readily admits to Myron that he is not the person with whom to discuss personal relationships, as he does not have any way to guide himself, let alone anyone else. Myron and Win seem to balance each other. Both are intelligent and care for other people. However, Myron has a conscience, and Win does not appear to have one.

=== Esperanza Diaz ===
Myron's right hand 'man' at MB SportsReps, Esperanza is the former star of the Fabulous Ladies of Wrestling, or FLOW. Spotted by a modeling agent at the age of seventeen, Esperanza had finally made a name for herself as Little Pocahontas. Now, working with Myron, Esperanza also attends night school, working toward her law degree.

Esperanza and Myron share what seems to be a brother and sister type of relationship. Esperanza holds nothing back with Myron, expressing her opinions freely, with no thought that Myron will be angry. Esperanza is very clear about her feelings toward Myron's girlfriend Jessica, calling her 'the bitch.' Esperanza has never forgiven Jessica for leaving Myron and breaking his heart many years ago. Myron understands this, and though he asks her not to call Jessica names, realizes that Esperanza cares for him deeply.

Esperanza is a key character in the novel Fade Away, as it is she that discovers the reason the blackmailers have contacted Greg. Esperanza also shows her depth of caring for Myron when she contact Win immediately in order to protect Myron from discovering what is on the blackmailer's tape.

=== Jessica ===
Jessica is Myron's girlfriend and a writer. Myron and Jessica began dating right before Myron was injured ten years ago, forcing him to give up his dream of professional basketball. Though they had broken up previously, they are back together, and though Myron technically still lived in his parents basement, the majority of the time he spent the night at her apartment.

Jessica is one of the few people who does not question Myron's taking Greg's place on the Dragons. Though everyone else that knows Myron is worried that he will be hurt when his chance is over, Jessica feels that Myron needs to play, even if only to prove to himself that he can not play the way he used to. It is Jessica's feeling that when Myron was injured he turned to her, crushing their relationship under the weight of his needs.

=== Greg Downing ===
A star player on the New Jersey Dragons, Greg disappears, causing Clip Arnstein to hire Myron to find him. Greg has been known to run away from problems before, and as he is in the middle of an ugly custody battle with his ex-wife Emily, the team owner thinks that things may have gotten to be too much for Greg. Myron is hired to find him. Myron feels a bond with Greg, as they had been competitors in their youth and though college. Myron believes that the bond they share had made them both better players. Myron had been injured before his chance to play for the Celtics, but Greg had gone on to become a major star.

In his search for Greg, Myron uncovers a blackmail scheme and murder, making Greg the main suspect of the police. Myron proves his innocence in the murder, but discovers that his knee injury was not a freak accident as he had thought for the past ten years, but had been orchestrated by Greg in retaliation for Myron sleeping with Emily the night before their wedding.

=== Audrey Wilson ===
Audrey Wilson is the sports writer assigned to the New Jersey Dragons. Audrey seems to catch on to the reason that Myron is actually on the team and convinces him that they should work together to solve the mystery of Greg's disappearance. In exchange for not releasing the information to the public, Myron agrees to share whatever he finds with her. Audrey agrees to use her contacts to find out what she can about Greg's personal life. Audrey is actually using Myron in order to find Greg, her secret lover. Audrey had killed Liz Gorman, the blackmailer, in order to protect Greg and the future of her unborn child.
