= Rosalind Eleazar =

British actress (born 1988)

- Eleazar in 2026
- Born: 29 August 1988 (age 38); London, England
- Occupation: Actress
- Years active: 2015–present
- Spouse: Gabriel Lo Giudice (m. 2023)
- Father: Courage Quashigah

Rosalind Eleazar (/ˈɛləzɑːr/ E-luh-zahr) (born 29 August 1988) is a British actress. On television, she is known for her roles in the BBC One series Howards End (2017), the ITV series Harlots (2017–2018), the Apple TV+ series Slow Horses (2022–2026) and the Netflix series Missing You (2025). Her films include The Personal History of David Copperfield (2019) and the title role in Misty Green (2026).

== Early life and education ==
Eleazar was born to a British mother and a Ghanaian father. As a child, she "intermittently" saw her father Courage Quashigah, a politician who served as Ghana's Minister of State for Agriculture and later Health between 2001 and 2009. She was primarily raised by her mother in Clapham, London.

Eleazar earned an academic scholarship to attend Gordonstoun School in Moray, Scotland. She studied Spanish and Mandarin at Nottingham University before moving to Ghana to work in her brother's production company. In her mid-20s, she moved back to the United Kingdom and trained at the London Academy of Music and Dramatic Art from where she graduated in 2015.

== Career ==
Eleazar appeared in Plaques and Tangles at the Royal Court Theatre in 2015. She made her television debut in 2016 with appearances in an episode of the BBC One medical soap opera Holby City, the Channel 4 miniseries National Treasure as Georgina and the BBC Two adaptation of Zadie Smith's NW as Shar. The following year, she had her first main roles in the BBC One miniseries Rellik as Christine Levison and Howards End as Jacky Bast, and joined the recurring cast of the ITV Encore and Hulu period drama Harlots as Violet Cross.

In 2019, Eleazar made her feature film debut as Agnes in Armando Iannucci's The Personal History of David Copperfield and played Kate in the ITV series Deep Water.

On the West End stage, Eleazar appeared in The Starry Messenger at Wyndham's Theatre and as Yelena in Uncle Vanya at the Harold Pinter Theatre.

In 2022, Eleazar began starring as Louisa Guy in the Apple TV+ spy thriller Slow Horses. She had a main role as Dr. Vivienne McMahon in the 2023 FX on Hulu miniseries Class of '09. She returned to the stage in The House of Bernarda Alba at the National Theatre. In 2025, Eleazar led Harlan Coben's Netflix miniseries Missing You as Kat Donovan. She also appeared in the film Rose of Nevada.

In 2026, Eleazar starred in the title role in Chris Rock's comedy-drama film Misty Green. While the film received mixed reviews, her performance received widespread critical acclaim.

== Personal life ==
Eleazer married Italian actor and producer Gabriele Lo Giudice in September 2023. The couple live in east London.

Eleazer has symbrachydactyly, a congenital abnormality characterized by short, missing or webbed fingers.

== Filmography ==
=== Film ===
Year	Title	Role	Notes
2015	Lost Village	Eleanor	Short film
2018	Pucker	(unknown)	Short film
2019	The Personal History of David Copperfield	Agnes	
2021	I'm Not in Love	Taylor	
2023	Broken Gargoyles	Vanessa	Short film
2023	National Theatre Live: The House of Bernarda Alba	Angustias	
2023	F**KED	Dani	Short film
2025	Rose of Nevada	Tina	
2026	Frank & Louis	Trish	
2026	Misty Green	Misty Green	

=== Television ===
Year	Title	Role	Notes
2016	Holby City	Betty Lyons	Episode: "Brave New World"
2016	National Treasure	Georgina	Miniseries; 2 episodes
2016	NW	Shar	Television film
2017	Rellik	Christine Levison	Mini-series; 4 episodes
2017	Howards End	Jacky Bast	Mini-series; 4 episodes
2017–2018	Harlots	Violet Cross	Series 1 & 2; 16 episodes
2018	Death in Paradise	Marie Gayle	Episode: "Dark Memories"
2018	Lore	Ava	Episode: "Elizabeth Bathory: Mirror, Mirror"
2019	Deep Water	Kate	Miniseries; 6 episodes
2020	Breeders	Ros	Episode: "No Cure: Part 2"
2020	Uncle Vanya	Yelena	Television film initially released in cinemas. Performed in an empty Harold Pinter Theatre due to the COVID-19 virus
2021	Master of None	Heather	Episode: "Moments in Love, Chapter 2"
2022–2026	Slow Horses	Louisa Guy	Series 1–6; 24 episodes
2023	Class of '09	Dr. Vivienne McMahon	Mini-series; 7 episodes
2025	Missing You	Det. Insp. Kat Donovan	Mini-series; 5 episodes

=== Video games ===
Year	Title	Role (voice)	Notes
2019	GreedFall	Various characters	
2020	The Waylanders	Khaldun	

=== Theatre ===
- Dido in 15 Heroines at the Jermyn Street Theatre (2020)
- Yelena in Uncle Vanya at the Harold Pinter Theatre in London (2020)
- Augustias in The House of Bernarda Alba at the National Theatre (2023)
- Wren in History at the Wyndham's Theatre, opposite John Malkovich as James (17 May-7 August 2027)

== Awards and honours ==
- 2015 Spotlight Prize Best Actor
- 2018 Screen Nation Rising Star
- 2020 Black British Theatre Awards – Nominee for Best Supporting Actress
- 2021 Clarence Derwent Award for Best Supporting Female

== See also ==
- List of British actors
