= Caught (2025 TV series) =

Argentine television series

- Spanish: Atrapados
- Genre: Thriller
- Based on: Caught by Harlan Coben
- Screenplay by: Ana Cohan; Miguel Cohan
- Directed by: Miguel Cohan; Hernan Goldfrid
- Starring: Soledad Villamil; Alberto Ammann; Juan Minujín; Matías Recalt
- Country of origin: Argentina
- Original language: Spanish
- No. of series: 1
- No. of episodes: 6

Production
- Producer: Vanessa Ragone
- Production company: Haddock Films

Original release
- Network: Netflix
- Release: 26 March 2025

Caught (Spanish: Atrapados) is an Argentine Spanish-language thriller television series adaption of the Harlan Coben novel of the same name. It was released on Netflix on 26 March 2025.

== Premise ==
A journalist specialises in exposing criminals who have previously evaded justice but finds her loyalties torn by the prime suspect in a case.

== Cast ==
- Soledad Villamil as Ema Garay
- Alberto Ammann as Leo Mercer
- Juan Minujín as Marcos Brown
- Matías Recalt as Bruno Meller Garay
- Fernán Mirás as Sheriff Herrera
- Mike Amigorena as Fran Briguel
- Carmela Rivero as Martina Schulz

== Production ==
The project was announced by Netflix in March 2023 with the Spanish-language title Atrapados. The six-part series is adapted from the novel Caught by Harlan Coben. It is directed by Miguel Cohan and Hernan Goldfrid, and produced by Vanessa Ragone for Haddock Films. Cohan co-wrote the adaptation with his sister Ana Cohan.

Filming took place in the first half of 2024 with filming locations including Buenos Aires and Bariloche.

The cast is led by Soledad Villamil, Alberto Ammann, Juan Minujínand Matías Recalt, and also includes Fernán Mirás, Mike Amigorena and Carmela Rivero.

== Release ==
The series was released on Netflix on 26 March 2025.

== Viewership ==
According to data from Showlabs, Caught ranked seventh on Netflix in the United States during the week of 24–30 March 2025.
