= Tell No One (novel) =

2001 thriller novel by Harlan Coben

- First edition (UK)
- Author: Harlan Coben
- Language: English
- Genre: Mystery, thriller
- Published: April 2001 Orion (UK); June 2001 Dell (US)
- Publication place: United States
- Media type: Print (hardback & paperback)
- Pages: 320 pp (Orion/paperback), 400 pp (Dell/paperback)
- ISBN: 0-7528-4471-7 (Orion), 0-440-23670-3 (Dell)
- OCLC: 47938690

Tell No One is a 2001 thriller novel by American writer Harlan Coben. This was Coben's third stand-alone novel and first since 1991, his previous seven books having all been part of the Myron Bolitar series. Said Coben, "I came up with a great idea that simply would not work for Myron."

The book was Coben's first novel to appear on The New York Times Best Seller list. It was also adapted into a French film with the same title in 2006 (French: Ne le dis à personne).

== Plot summary ==
David and Elizabeth Beck, both 25 years old and married for less than a year, are celebrating the anniversary of their first kiss at a secluded lake when Elizabeth is abducted and later murdered. Although the killer is found and prosecuted, David never gets over the tragic incident. On the eighth anniversary of Elizabeth's death, two long-dead bodies are unearthed at the same lake where the kidnapping occurred. In addition, David receives a shocking email from an unidentified source that mentions a phrase only David and Elizabeth should know.

== Awards ==
The novel was nominated for the 2002 Anthony Award, Macavity Award, Edgar Award and Barry Award.
