= Dino Fetscher =

Welsh actor (born 1988)

- Born: Dino Fabián Gamecho; 9 June 1988 (age 38); Cardiff, Wales
- Education: Central School of Speech and Drama
- Occupation: Actor

Dino Fetscher (born 9 June 1988) is a Welsh actor. He is best known for his roles in the television series Banana, Paranoid, Gentleman Jack and Years and Years. Fetscher also starred as the synthetic Stanley in Humans.

In 2023 he appeared in the Apple TV+ series Foundation as Glawen Curr, and in 2024 starred in the Netflix drama Fool Me Once as Marty McGregor.

== Early life and education ==
Fetscher was born Dino Fabián Gamecho in Cardiff, Wales. His mother is German and his father is Welsh-Basque. Fetscher trained at the Central School of Speech and Drama in London.

== Career ==
In 2008, aged 19, Fetscher won that year's Mr Gay UK.

As an actor, Fetscher's first television role was as Aiden in the 2015 series Cucumber and its spin-off anthology series Banana. He portrayed series lead DC Alec Wayfield in the 2016 series Paranoid, and the synthetic human Stanley in Humans in 2018. In 2019, Fetscher played the recurring role of Ralph Cousins in Years and Years and portrayed Thomas Beech in Gentleman Jack. In 2023, he appeared in the Apple TV+ series Foundation as Glawen Curr, and in 2024 starred in the Netflix drama Fool Me Once as Marty McGregor.

Since December 2025, Fetscher has played the role of Mary's Teacher in the West End production of Oh, Mary!

== Recognition ==
In 2017, he was nominated as Celebrity Rising Star at the British LGBT Awards.

In 2022, Fetscher was nominated for an Olivier Award for Best Actor in a Supporting Role for his performance in a West End production of The Normal Heart.

== Personal life ==
Fetscher is gay. In a 2015 interview with Attitude, Fetscher said he had come out to his family as a teenager, adding, "I was really lucky, my whole family were all totally fine."

== Filmography ==
=== Film ===
Year	Title	Role	Notes
2013	An Equinox of Love	David Greenberg	Short film
2013	Forget the Pact	Dave	Short film
2015	Iscariot	James Bennet	Short film
2015	Samuel's Getting Hitched	Samuel	Short film
2016	First	Soldier	Short film
2016	Now You See Me 2	Octa Guard	
2023	Good Boy	Leon	Short film
2026	Good Luck, Have Fun, Don't Die	Blaise	

=== Television ===
Year	Title	Role	Notes
2015	Cucumber	Aiden	2 episodes
2015	Banana	Aiden	Episode: "Episode #1.7"
2016	Paranoid	DC Alec Wayfield	8 episodes
2018	Humans	Stanley	7 episodes
2019	Years and Years	Ralph Cousins	3 episodes
2019–22	Gentleman Jack	Thomas Beech	3 episodes
2020	The Split	Ian Gibson	1 episode
2023	Foundation	Glawen Curr	Season 2; 6 episodes
2024	Fool Me Once	Marty McGreggor	8 episodes
2026	Silent Witness	Jason Webb	Series 29; 2 episodes
2026	Under Salt Marsh	Gareth Morgan	6 episodes

== Awards and nominations ==
Year	Award	Category	Work	Result	Ref.
2022	Olivier Awards	Best Actor in a Supporting Role	The Normal Heart	Nominated	
2022	WhatsOnStage Awards	Best Supporting Performer in a Male Identifying Role in a Play	The Normal Heart	Nominated	
