= Tell No One =

2006 film by Guillaume Canet

- French theatrical release poster
- French: Ne le dis à personne
- Directed by: Guillaume Canet
- Screenplay by: Guillaume Canet; Philippe Lefebvre
- Based on: Tell No One by Harlan Coben
- Produced by: Luc Besson; Pierre-Ange Le Pogam; Alain Attal
- Starring: François Cluzet; Marie-Josée Croze; André Dussollier; Kristin Scott Thomas; François Berléand; Nathalie Baye; Jean Rochefort; Guillaume Canet
- Cinematography: Christophe Offenstein
- Edited by: Hervé de Luze
- Music by: Matthieu Chedid
- Production companies: Canal+ CinéCinéma
- Distributed by: EuropaCorp Distribution
- Release date: 1 November 2006 (France)
- Running time: 131 minutes
- Country: France
- Language: French
- Budget: $13.5 million
- Box office: $33.4 million

Tell No One (French: Ne le dis à personne) is a 2006 French thriller film directed by Guillaume Canet and based on the 2001 novel of the same name by Harlan Coben. Written by Canet and Philippe Lefebvre and starring François Cluzet, the film won four categories at the 2007 César Awards in France: Best Director (Guillaume Canet), Best Actor (François Cluzet), Best Editing and Best Music Written for a Film.

== Plot ==
Eight years after the murder of his wife, Margot, pediatrician Alexandre Beck receives an email containing security footage that appears to depict his wife alive and unharmed. Concurrently, two bodies are discovered buried near the lake where Margot was killed, and evidence collected by law enforcement appears to implicate Alex in the homicides.

Matters are complicated when a group thugs, also tracking Margot's emails, begin to terrorize Alex's friends, leading to the death of one of them, Charlotte. Having been last seen with Alex before her death, the police move in to arrest him at the hospital, but Alex escapes with the help from Bruno, a gangster who felt he owed Alex after the latter treated his ill son. Heading to park, per the email, Alex planned meeting with Margot is thwarted when he is kidnapped by the thugs before Bruno rescues him again.

The following day, Alex is exonerated after his sister, Anne, and her wife, Helene, provide an alibi through their attorney. Upon meeting with law enforcement and reviewing the collected evidence, Alex recalls the unusual behavior of Margot’s father following her death and subsequently confronts him at his residence, where the truth is ultimately revealed.

Two months before the event at the lake, Margot discovered that Philippe Neuville, the son of aristocrat Gilbert Neuville, had been sexually abusing children from a children's trust. While attempting to secure a confession, Margot was severely beaten by Philippe. Upon witnessing the assault, her father shot and killed Philippe.

Fearing retaliation from Gilbert, who controlled a significant portion of the police force, Margot's father began wiretapping Gilbert's phones. He discovered that Gilbert had hired two men to assassinate Margot. To thwart the plot, he killed the two men, staged Margot's death using the body of a deceased heroin addict, and sent her into hiding. He also further reveals that Alex's late father who worked as horse rancher for Gilbert was the one that discovered the abuse first and reported to him. However, Gilbert had him killed to silence him. Following this confession, Margot's father kills himself to avoid arrest, given that Alex was wearing a wire which transmitted everything to the police.

Unbeknownst to police, Margot's father knew that Alex was wearing a wire, and in a moment of blocking the transmission, he revealed to Alex that Margot actually shot Philippe, not him. His actions having ensured that she would never be suspected.

Gilbert is arrested for his crimeswhile Alex and Margot finally reunite at the lake where they had fallen in love as children.

== Cast ==
- François Cluzet: Alexandre Beck
- Marie-Josée Croze: Margot Beck
- André Dussollier: Jacques Laurentin
- Kristin Scott Thomas: Hélène Perkins
- François Berléand: Eric Levkowitch
- Nathalie Baye: Maître Elisabeth Feldman
- Jean Rochefort: Gilbert Neuville
- Marina Hands: Anne Beck
- Gilles Lellouche: Bruno
- Philippe Lefebvre: Lieutenant Philippe Meynard
- Florence Thomassin: Charlotte Bertaud
- Olivier Marchal: Bernard Valenti
- Guillaume Canet: Philippe Jean-Pierre Neuville
- Brigitte Catillon: Captain Barthas
- Samir Guesmi: Lieutenant Saraoui
- Jean-Pierre Lorit: Lavelle
- Jalil Lespert: Yaël Gonzales
- Éric Savin: The prosecutor
- Éric Naggar: Pierre Ferrault
- Philippe Canet: François Beck
- Danièle Ajoret: Madame Beck
- Laurent Lafitte: The Basque
- Martine Chevallier: Martine Laurentin
- Thierry Neuvic: Marc Bertaud
- Mika'ela Fisher: Zak
- Françoise Bertin: Antoinette Levkowitch
- Andrée Damant: Simone
- Pierre-Benoist Varoclier: Nurse
- Anne Marivin: Alex's secretary
- Sara Martins: Bruno's friend

== Production ==
The script made several alterations to the book; a torture expert changed from an Asian male to a white female, and the identity of the killer was switched. The book's author was quoted in an interview as saying that the film's ending was better than his original ending.

== Reception ==
Tell No One was well received both critically and commercially. Michael Caine said of the film it was the best he had seen in 2007 on the BBC's Film 2007 programme. He also included it among his Top Ten movies of all time in his 2010 autobiography, The Elephant to Hollywood.

=== Critical response ===
On the review aggregator website Rotten Tomatoes, 93% of 119 critics' reviews are positive, with an average rating of 7.6/10. The website's consensus reads: "An intense, well-crafted thriller, Tell No One is equal parts heart-pounding and heart-wrenching." Metacritic, which uses a weighted average, assigned the film a score of 82 out of 100, based on 30 critics, indicating "universal acclaim".

=== Box office ===
The film generated $17 million in ticket sales during its first four weeks at the French box office. In total, the film grossed $22,194,261 in France becoming the 12th highest-grossing film of the year with 3,111,809 tickets sold. Music Box Films acquired the rights to the film and gave it a limited theatrical release on July 2, 2008. The film opened in eight theaters grossing $169,707 during its opening weekend. In total, the film grossed $6,177,192 in the US and Canada.

=== Top ten lists ===
The film appeared on many critics' top ten lists of the best films of 2008.

- 1st: Marc Doyle, Metacritic.com
- 2nd: Marjorie Baumgarten, The Austin Chronicle
- 7th: Kimberly Jones, The Austin Chronicle
- 7th: Marc Mohan, The Oregonian
- 7th: Shawn Levy, The Oregonian
- 8th: Stephen Holden, The New York Times
- 9th: Kenneth Turan, Los Angeles Times
- 10th: Ann Hornaday, The Washington Post
- 10th: Owen Gleiberman, Entertainment Weekly
