= No Second Chance =

2003 novel by Harlan Coben

- First edition (US)
- Author: Harlan Coben
- Language: English
- Genre: Mystery, thriller
- Published: April 28, 2003 Dutton Adult
- Publication place: United States
- Media type: Print (hardcover & paperback)
- Pages: 352 pp (hardcover)
- ISBN: 0-525-94729-9
- OCLC: 51042013

No Second Chance is a thriller released in 2003 and is the fifth stand-alone novel written by Harlan Coben. It was the first international Book of the Month Club pick in 2003.

== Plot ==
Dr. Marc Seidman has been shot twice, his wife has been murdered, and his six-month-old daughter has been kidnapped. When he gets the ransom note, he knows he has only one chance to get this right. But there is nowhere he can turn to and no one he can trust.

== Television adaptation ==
The novel was adapted to a miniseries Une chance de trop for TF1 and RTL-TVI in 2015.
