= Miracle Cure (novel) =

1991 novel by Harlan Coben

- First edition
- Author: Harlan Coben
- Language: English
- Genre: Mystery, thriller
- Publisher: British Amer Pub LTD
- Publication date: 1991
- Publication place: United States
- Media type: Print (hardback, paperback)
- Pages: 391

Miracle Cure is the second novel by American crime writer Harlan Coben. It was first published in 1991 and was reissued by Signet in 2011.

== Plot summary ==
The plot concerns a clinic that treats people with AIDS. Just as the scientists working there are on the brink of a breakthrough in curing the disease, one of them dies. Initially it looks like suicide, but when a journalist investigates, she finds that it is murder. There is a killer targeting the patients of the clinic as well.
