= Hold Tight (miniseries) =

2022 Polish drama television miniseries

- Polish Netflix poster
- Polish: Zachowaj spokój
- Genre: Crime drama
- Based on: Hold Tight by Harlan Coben
- Written by: Agata Malesińska; Wojciech Miloszewski
- Directed by: Michał Gazda; Bartosz Konopka
- Starring: Magdalena Boczarska; Leszek Lichota; Krzysztof Oleksyn; Grzegorz Damięcki; Agata Łabno; Tomasz Drabek; Klementyna Karnkowska; Mikołaj Śliwa; Jakub Pruski
- Composer: Andrzej Smolik
- Country of origin: Poland
- Original language: Polish
- No. of episodes: 6

Production
- Producers: Harlan Coben; Andrzej Muszyński
- Cinematography: Tomasz Augustynek; Piotr Niemyjski
- Editors: Andrzej Dąbrowski; Piotr Kmiecik
- Running time: 42–53 minutes
- Production company: ATM Grupa

Original release
- Network: Netflix
- Release: 22 April 2022

Hold Tight (Polish: Zachowaj spokój) is a 2022 Polish crime drama television miniseries based on the novel of the same name by Harlan Coben. It was released on Netflix on 22 April 2022.

== Premise ==
An 18-year-old goes missing shortly after his friend's death, sending an affluent housing estate in Warsaw into a frenzy.

== Cast ==
=== Main ===
- Magdalena Boczarska as Anna Barczyk
- Leszek Lichota as Michał Barczyk
- Krzysztof Oleksyn as Adam Barczyk
- Grzegorz Damięcki as Paweł Kopiński
- Agata Łabno as Kaja Kopińska
- Tomasz Drabek as Janusz Nowak
- Klementyna Karnkowska as Jaśmina Nowak
- Mikołaj Śliwa as Grzegorz "Gajos" Gajewicz
- Jakub Pruski as Błażej Myszkowski

=== Recurring ===
- Agnieszka Grochowska as Laura Goldsztajn-Kopińska
- Julia Wyszyńska as Officer Ewelina Miller
- Adam Nawojczyk as Officer Franciszek Trybała
- Monika Kwiatkowska as Renata Kordowska
- Dominika Krzemińska as Ola Barczyk
- Justyna Wasilewska as Wiera
- Jacek Poniedziałek as Natan
- Marta Pietka as Nina Reszke
- Jan Litvinovitch as Kacper Rozbicki
- Mirosław Zbrojewicz as Borys Gajewicz
- Wiktoria Gorodecka as Beata Hall
- Sylwia Boroń as Marianna Nowak
- Sebastian Perdek as Officer Marek
- Eryk Kulm as Officer Jacek
- Bartłomiej Topa as Tadeusz Lewicki
- Katarzyna Kwiatkowska as Danuta Lewicka
- Aleksandra Justa as Oliwia Danowska
- Barbara Jonak as Joanna Makowska

== Episodes ==
No.	Title	Duration	Original release date
1	"Episode 1"	51 min	22 April 2022
2	"Episode 2"	42 min	22 April 2022
3	"Episode 3"	42 min	22 April 2022
4	"Episode 4"	49 min	22 April 2022
5	"Episode 5"	48 min	22 April 2022
6	"Episode 6"	53 min	22 April 2022

== Production ==
The series was filmed in the Fort Cze Aparthotel, located in the Warsaw Fortress.
