= Back Spin (novel) =

Novel by author Harlan Coben

- First edition
- Author: Harlan Coben
- Language: English
- Series: A Myron Bolitar Novel
- Genre: Mystery, thriller
- Publisher: Dell Books
- Publication date: 1997
- Publication place: United States
- Media type: Print (hardback & paperback)
- Pages: 352

Back Spin is a novel by author Harlan Coben. It is the fourth novel in his series of a crime solver and sports agent named Myron Bolitar.

== Plot summary ==
In Back Spin, sports agent Myron Bolitar is called on to investigate the kidnapping of Chad Coldren, son of two professional golfers, while Chad's father Jack is well on his way to winning the U.S. Open. Myron is drawn into a plot that goes back to the last time Jack Coldren nearly won the U.S. Open, twenty-three years ago. Myron's investigations suddenly shift when Jack Coldren is murdered and Chad is released. Finally, Myron traces the murder to Jack's wife Linda, who shot him because he could not succumb to the kidnappers' real demands, that he throw the U.S. Open.

As the story opens, Myron is attending the U.S. Open. Jack Coldren is unexpectedly leading, and promising newcomer Tad Crispin is in second place. Jack's wife Linda, a professional golfer as well, asks Myron for help. Their son has been kidnapped. Myron agrees to help, even though his friend and business associate Win refuses to assist because Linda is his first cousin, related to Win's estranged mother. The kidnappers phone twice without making specific demands. Meanwhile, Myron learns that Chad used his ATM card at a cash machine near a sleazy motel. At first, Myron suspects that Chad might be pulling a hoax, but he soon learns that one of the kidnappers is a neo-Nazi thug.

Slowly, Myron uncovers possible suspects. Jack's former caddy, Lloyd Rennart, who Jack blamed for his loss at the U.S. Open years ago, has disappeared. He's possibly committed suicide, but he could be out for revenge. Esme Fong has signed Tad Crispin as a spokesman for a new line of golf clothes, and if Jack loses, her ad campaign will be a success. Chad's best friend's father is a rich crook, and Jack has a mysterious argument with his female caddy.

The kidnappers send Chad's severed finger to Linda, and Myron is horrified. Then, he tracks down the neo-Nazi and finds that he's been murdered. The next thing Myron knows, Jack has been murdered, too. Then, the kidnappers release Chad, leaving Myron with unanswered questions. Jack's wife Linda is arrested, and her lawyer makes Myron an attorney of record to protect her.

Myron learns that Esme is really Rennart's daughter from his first marriage, and she kidnapped Chad to make sure Jack lost the U.S. Open. After Tito, the neo-Nazi, cut off Chad's finger, Esme killed him. Myron turns Esme over to the police. Myron realizes that there's more to the story, though. Jack knew that the kidnappers wanted him to lose the U.S. Open, but he kept winning anyway. When his wife Linda found out, she killed him to save her son. As Linda's attorney, Myron can't go to the police, and Linda will likely never be brought to justice for her husband's murder.

== Major themes ==
=== The drive to win ===
Win talks to Myron about the drive to win that he sees in Jack Coldren. Win sees this drive as something negative, a force that causes professional athletes to put themselves above all others and neglect their personal lives and those who love them. He believes that Myron had this drive as a professional basketball player. The force of competition activates this desire. Myron doesn't believe that the drive to win is a bad thing. He sees pushing for success as noble.

Jack's drive to win makes him endanger his own son, though. Jack refuses to lose, even though his son has been kidnapped. Even after receiving his son's severed finger, Jack cannot let himself lose. He makes a nearly impossible put to tie the game. After he talks to the kidnappers again, Jack promises to lose, but he knows that he will not be able to hold himself to that promise. His wife knows it, too. Linda ultimately kills Jack, not out of revenge or hatred, but to squelch his overpowering drive to win.

The events of the story support Win's view of the drive to win, showing that the author sees the negative aspects of intense competition. After all, the U.S. Open is only a golf game. Winning it brings money, fame, and career opportunities, but when weighed against the life of a son, few people would do what Jack did. Jack's extraordinary competitive drive ends up being his own downfall.

=== Justice ===
Myron investigates crime, and he brings criminals to justice. The question of what is just is a complex one, though. Myron has Esme arrested for kidnapping and murder, but she believes that she was only seeking justice. Through Jack Coldren's actions, her father was ruined and her mother died. Esme wants Jack to pay for what he did. Like Myron, she seeks justice on her own.

Win also seeks justice. He takes untraceable Chevy cars and goes trolling through the bad areas of cities to find criminals. Then, he makes the criminals pay for their actions. Myron's point of view of this vigilante justice is ambiguous. He is opposed to it, but Esperanza points out that what Win does is not too far removed from what Myron does. The only difference is that Win is picking the crimes and criminals to attack. Myron uses almost any means, including torture, threats, and lies, to get what he wants. Are his means just? Myron implies that Win's nighttime activities are sinister, but Win only lets out that he reported where a molester buried two bodies, bringing him to justice.

Ultimately, Myron puts his own idea of justice above societal justice. He turns in Esme, but he lets Linda go, although he knows that she killed her husband. He risks disbarment if he turns on Linda.

=== Discrimination ===
The setting of professional golf and the ritzy Merion golf course create an atmosphere of riches. The golfing world is elite and well-off. This is contrasted with the criminal elements that Myron faces, including the neo-Nazi Tito. The picture is complicated by the presence of minorities, and they joke about discrimination. Norm is Jewish, and he receives awkward glances at the golf course clubhouse. Esperanza is Hispanic, and she is not the type that usually heads into Win's expensive neighborhood, except as a housekeeper. Victoria is black, and her parents were servants. Carl is also black, a different kind of servant of a rich criminal.

Both racial and socioeconomic discrimination pervade the story. The criminals who escape without punishment are all well-off white people. Matt's father is insane and incompetent, and yet he's a wealthy and successful criminal. Win's mother bribed a caddy to make Jack Coldren lose the U.S. Open, and yet she is not punished and takes the secret to her grave. Linda is rich and white, and she can afford a high-powered attorney, the child of her family's servants, who is still serving in a servile capacity, although in a more white-collar field. Linda is unlikely to ever go to jail for killing her husband.

Esme Fong, however well-off she is, is still a half-Asian woman. She is the daughter of a former caddy and has no wealthy family. She is a kidnapper, and she killed Tito. Are her crimes truly worse than Cissy and Linda's? Like Cissy, she seeks what she thinks is just private vengeance. Like Linda, she kills in a situation where she believes it is necessary. Still, she is turned over to the police and will likely be in jail for life.

== Style ==
=== Point of view ===
The novel is told from Myron's point of view, by a third-person semi-omniscient narrator. Although he is a sports agent, Myron's real role in the story is that of a detective. Having the reader experience the story inside Myron's head allows the reader to become the detective. As Myron unravels clues, the reader slowly learns what is happening as well. The reader learns Myron's theories and speculations as he recounts them to himself.

At one point during the novel, the narrative point of view leaves Myron. The story follows Esperanza instead, when she goes into the neo-Nazis' dive hangout. At this point, Esperanza becomes the lead investigator, going into danger to find out evidence. The reader doesn't follow Esperanza when she's researching on the Internet or at the library. The element of danger makes it important for the reader to follow her into the bar, because the situation will create suspense and excitement. Myron follows the action through the open phone line, and the reader follows through Esperanza's point of view.

== Setting ==
The setting is among the golf world, at Merion's golf course in Philadelphia, during the U.S. Open championship. The sports setting allows the author to address the theme of the drive to win at all costs and sets high stakes for the characters in the form of the U.S. Open championship, a career-making event. The U.S. Open going on in the background provides tension. The reader follows along with Jack's dramatic winning streak and waits to find out whether he will lose his lead.

The golf setting explains how Myron, a sports agent, gets involved in the drama, but it also makes him a fish out of water. Golf is not Myron's game. He feels very uncomfortable in the wealthy setting and on the golf course. He is a basketball player, and he finds the outlandish clothing and the behaviour of the golf fans inexplicable. This adds a touch of humour to the story, as well. Only at the end of the story does Myron seem to begin to understand the allure of playing golf.

The city of Philadelphia also provides a backdrop of long-standing wealthy families like Win as well as rampant poverty and ethnic diversity, allowing the author to explore the theme of discrimination. Not too far from the exclusive golf course and club, Myron finds a sleazy by-the-hour motel and a backwards neo-Nazi criminal. The wealthy go to the low-class neighbourhoods to have illicit affairs, and the criminals come to the wealthy neighbourhoods in the employ of the criminal idle rich.

== Characters ==
=== Myron Bolitar ===
Myron Bolitar is a sports agent, but he also investigates crimes. He usually enlists the help of his friend Win, a slick and violent agent with a history of secret government work. When he's called on to investigate the kidnapping of Chad and Linda Coldren's son, though, Myron finds himself on his own. He feels out of his depth without Win's help, and he only seems to regain his balance when his assistant Esperanza comes out to help him.

During the story, Myron takes on some of Win's roles. Not only does he follow people and get into fights, but Myron also resorts to torture and intimidation to get information from criminals. Myron is beginning to have misgivings about the tactics he's using, and he feels that he's starting to look at the world in a different way. Perhaps he is becoming more detached and colder on some level, like his friend Win.

Myron is in a relationship with his girlfriend Jessica, but he is afraid of being hurt. He explains his attraction to Linda Coldren because of his fear of his committed relationship with Jessica. Myron is self-deprecating and uses humor as a defense mechanism. This gets him into trouble sometimes, including when he makes jokes while he is being held by Reginald Squires, a rich and loony criminal. Ultimately, though, Myron is an intelligent investigator. He finds out information and figures out the truth of what happened, even though he cannot reveal everything to the police.

=== Linda Coldren ===
Linda Coldren is an accomplished professional golfer whose career has brought her considerable success. Although golf remains an important part of her life, her son Chad is her top priority. Unable to have a child herself, Linda and her husband Jack welcomed Chad through surrogacy. However, her lack of a biological connection to Chad creates concerns about custody, making her hesitant to consider separation from her husband for fear of losing her son.

Linda has complete faith in her son. Even though she has not seen him for two days before the kidnapping, she cannot believe that he is involved in any way. She continuously tells Myron that the kidnapping cannot be a hoax. She also insists that they cannot take any chances and bring in the police or the FBI. She doesn't want to harm her son.

When Linda learns that the kidnappers want Jack to lose the tournament, she realizes that Jack won't be able to throw the game. She ultimately shoots her husband to save her son. Long ago, she has lost any feelings she had for Jack, and she's been unfaithful to him. After the murder, Linda retreats behind her family's high-powered attorney, who will not give any information to the police. Linda's money and position will keep her safe, no matter what she's done.

=== Jack Coldren ===
Jack Coldren is a professional golfer. Twenty-three years ago, Jack lost the U.S. Open. It was at the beginning of his career, and Jack had a commanding lead. However, in the sixteenth hole, Jack landed in a hazard. He choked, lost his lead, and lost the U.S. Open. His promising career suddenly ended. Jack never became a big name in golf and often did not make the qualifiers to play professionally.

Jack is gay and stays married to his wife Linda, because it helps him stay in the closet. He is bitterly disappointed. At the beginning of the novel, Jack is back in the U.S. Open at his home golf course, Merion, the same place where he choked years ago. Jack again has a commanding lead, and after years of mediocrity, the drive to win has awakened in him with a vengeance. He cannot let anything stop him.

When Jack learns that his son has been kidnapped, he still wants to win the U.S. Open and regain something of what he lost at the beginning of his career. When the kidnappers demand that Jack throw the championship, Jack cannot bring himself to obey. Jack's whole life has been building up to replaying the events of twenty-three years ago, and he grasps at the idea that the kidnapping could be a hoax. Even after the kidnappers cut off his son's finger, Jack cannot force himself to lose. Finally, he tries to shoot himself, and Linda claims that in the end, he wants her to kill him.

=== Chad Coldren ===
Chad Coldren is Jack and Linda Coldren's son. He is sixteen-years-old, and he's been seduced by Esme Fong. He doesn't realize that he's being used by Esme for her own purposes and brags about his catch to his friend Matt. Chad goes to a motel with Esme, where he is kidnapped. He is held captive by Tito, and his finger is cut off. Chad is finally released after his father is murdered.

=== Windsor Horne Lockwood III (Win) ===
Win is Myron's good friend and business associate. A financial planner, Win handles the money for all of Myron's sports clients. Myron and Win are staying at a guesthouse on Win's family's estate. Win is wealthy, and the Philadelphia elite are his home territory. However, Win refuses to help Myron with the investigation. Linda is Win's cousin on his mother's side, and Win remains estranged from his mother, refusing to have anything to do with her.

Win has not spoken to his mother since he was eight, when he walked in on her having sex with his riding instructor. The person who arranged for Win's mother to get caught was Jack Coldren, another reason why Win won't have anything to do with the case. Win is a distant and possibly deeply scarred person. He has unmarked cars that he uses to troll bad neighbourhoods for criminals, who he brings to vigilante justice.

=== Esperanza ===
Esperanza is Myron's assistant, a former professional wrestler whose stage name was "Little Pocahontas." She has just graduated from NYU Law School. When she learns that Win refuses to help on the case, she comes out to Philadelphia to help Myron. Now that she has a law degree, Esperanza wants to become a partner in Myron's firm.
