= Fool Me Once (TV series) =

British television series

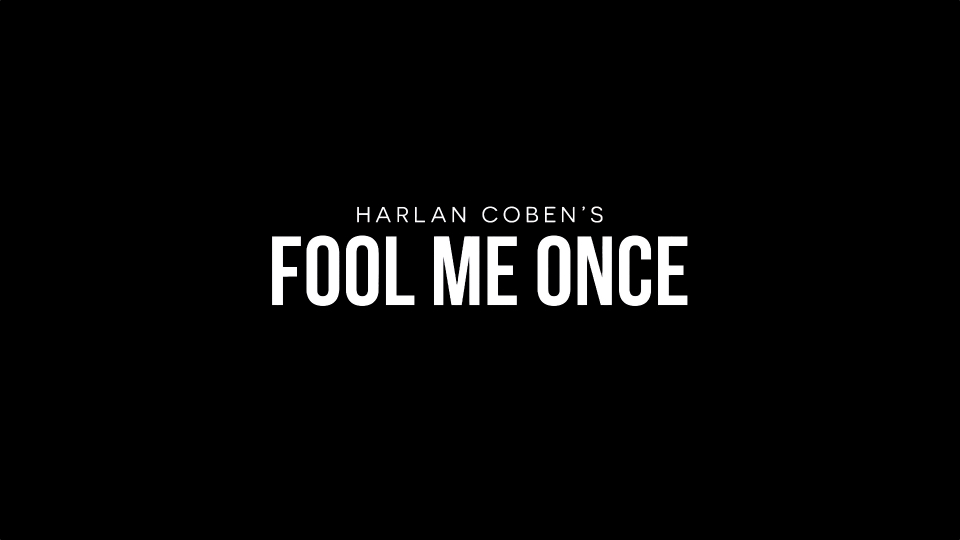
- Also known as: Harlan Coben's Fool Me Once
- Genre: Thriller
- Based on: Fool Me Once by Harlan Coben
- Written by: Danny Brocklehurst; Charlotte Coben; Yemi Oyefuwa; Nina Metivier; Tom Farrelly
- Directed by: David Moore; Nimer Rashed
- Starring: Michelle Keegan; Adeel Akhtar; Dino Fetscher; Richard Armitage; Joanna Lumley
- Theme music composer: David Buckley; Luke Richards
- Country of origin: United Kingdom
- Original language: English
- No. of episodes: 8

Production
- Executive producers: Harlan Coben; Nicola Shindler; Danny Brocklehurst; Richard Fee
- Producer: Jessica Taylor
- Running time: 35–55 minutes
- Production company: Quay Street Productions

Original release
- Network: Netflix
- Release: 1 January 2024

Fool Me Once (also known as Harlan Coben's Fool Me Once) is a 2024 British thriller television series, produced by Quay Street Productions for Netflix. It was adapted by Danny Brocklehurst from Harlan Coben's 2016 novel of the same name. It features Michelle Keegan, Adeel Akhtar, Dino Fetscher, Richard Armitage and Joanna Lumley. On 1 January 2024, the series premiered on Netflix.

== Plot ==
Maya Stern, a former military pilot, is struggling with the murder of her husband, Joe Burkett. After installing a nanny cam to monitor her young daughter, she is shocked to see Joe—believed to be dead—appear in the footage. This discovery unravels a web of secrets linked to the earlier death of Maya's sister, Claire, and exposes dark conspiracies tied to Joe's wealthy family and their pharmaceutical company, Burkett Global. As Maya investigates, she uncovers dangerous truths involving whistleblower Corey Rudzinski, whose revelations about the company's misconduct spark a deeper cover-up. Facing betrayal, hidden motives, and threats, Maya's pursuit of justice leads to shocking revelations about Joe's past, her own actions, and the crimes buried within the Burkett legacy.

== Cast ==
=== Main ===
- Michelle Keegan as Maya Burkett-Stern
- Adeel Akhtar as police DS (Detective Sergeant) Sami Kierce
- Dino Fetscher as police DC (Detective Constable) Marty McGreggor
- Richard Armitage as Joseph "Joe" Burkett, Maya's apparently deceased husband whom she inexplicably sees visiting their daughter Lily on nanny cam footage
  - Samuel Glyde Rees as young Joe
- Joanna Lumley as Judith Burkett, the matriarch of the Burkett family and their pharmaceutical company; Joe's mother and Maya's mother-in-law

=== Supporting ===
- Emmett J. Scanlan as Shane Tessier, Maya's best friend in the army
- Joe Armstrong as Alexander Dosman, CEO of the tech firm Bimbal and the ex-boyfriend of Maya's sister Claire Walker
- Marcus Garvey as Eddie Walker, Claire's husband
- Jade Anouka as Nicole Butler, Kierce's sponsor helping him overcome alcoholism
- Dänya Griver as Abby Walker, Claire's daughter
- Natalie Anderson as Claire Walker, Maya's deceased beloved older sister
- Daniel Burt as Daniel "Dan" Walker, Claire's son
- Thea Taylor-Morgan as Lily Burkett, Maya and Joe's daughter
- Anthony Howell as Christopher Swain, a former school friend and soccer teammate of Joe and Andrew Burkett
- Laurie Kynaston as Corey "the Whistle" Rudzinski, the journalist
- Charlie Cain as Louis, Claire's first son and Abby and Dan's half-brother
- Hattie Morahan as Caroline Burkett, Joe's young sister
- James Northcote as Neil Burkett, Joe's young brother
- Adelle Leonce as Eva Finn, Maya and Claire's best friend
- Edward Harper-Jones as Andrew Burkett, Judith's first son who died when he was a teenager
- Craige Els as Coach Phillip "Phil" Dawson, a verbally abusive youth soccer coach whom Maya stands up to in defense of her niece Abby
- Natalia Kostrzewa as Izabella, the nanny for Maya's daughter Lily
- Frederick Skodza as Luka, Izabella's partner and accomplice

== Episodes ==
No.	Title	Directed by	Written by	Original release date
1	"Episode 1"	David Moore	Danny Brocklehurst	1 January 2024
Mysterious masked figures surround someone tied up in a chair while on school grounds during a hazing ritual. Former military captain and helicopter pilot Maya Stern Burkett attends her husband Joe's funeral on his mother Judith's estate. Maya has frequent flashbacks to her deployments, to Joe and his shooting, as well as to her sister Claire's prior tragic murder. Her friend Eva gifts her a motion-activated nanny cam for her young daughter Lily's room. Maya is shocked to find footage of Joe visiting their daughter on the camera, though Lily shakes her head "no" when asked if she recalls the encounter. DS (Detective Sergeant) Sami Kierce is the detective overseeing the investigation of the homicide—paired with DC (Detective Constable) Marty McGreggor—whom Maya contacts after Lily's nanny Izabella pepper sprays Maya and bolts upon being questioned about the footage of Joe. After Maya physically confronts and humiliates her niece Abby's football coach, Phil Dawson, for being harsh and verbally abusive toward the kids, her brother-in-law Eddie forbids her from seeing his children, citing that death follows her. Told that Izabella is at her mother-in-law Judith's, Maya tries to catch up with her unsuccessfully. She returns to Judith and confronts her for not detaining her. Kierce discovers that the Glock pistol used on Joe by one of the two motorbike assailants was the same as the one used to murder Maya's sister Claire not long before.
2	"Episode 2"	David Moore	Danny Brocklehurst	1 January 2024
Kierce re-interviews Maya in light of the two homicides' connection to the same gun. Claire worked for the Burketts' pharmaceutical company. Eva tells Maya that Claire had a "secret" phone, so she searches her house when no one is home. Just as she finds it, Eddie comes home. He does not recognise it, and Maya insists on taking it to investigate. The number it regularly connects to belongs to a video arcade, where the manager insists that he knows nothing. Kierce gets increasingly more concerned with his ever more frequent blackout spells. Maya is summoned to the reading of Joe's will, which gets postponed for lack of a death certificate. His sister Caroline has some conspiracy theories and shows Maya regular bank transfers from the Burkett family to an account under Kierce's name.
3	"Episode 3"	David Moore	Charlotte Coben	1 January 2024
Maya attempts to get Judith to explain the payments to Kierce, but her son Neil intervenes. Claire's kids, Abby and Dan, find old photos of her young and pregnant and a man they have never seen, so they track him down, leading to them finding the tech CEO Alexander Dosman who recently relocated there. They organise to meet later. Meanwhile, Kierce has tests run on him for his continual dizziness and occasional blackouts. Maya tracks down her lead to the arcade, finding the red car which has been following her. Without getting a clear visual of the driver, she follows but loses them. As Maya put a tracker on it, she gets her MP friend Shane to locate the car. While giving a helicopter flying lesson she tracks the car, lands and is found by the journalist Corey "the Whistle" Rudzinski. He knew Claire because she wanted to protect Maya, so she helped him investigate Joe's company. In the process, they discover Tommy Dark has been receiving money from the Burketts for decades.
4	"Episode 4"	Nimer Rashed	Yemi Oyefuwa	1 January 2024
Shane surprises Maya with a late-night visit, and they brainstorm. Dark owned the boat on which Andrew, Joe's younger brother, met his demise. Abby, upon meeting Alexander, asks what happened to her mother's first baby but leaves upon realising he has no idea about it. Coach Dawson's motorbike is seen in CCTV footage near the park at the time Joe was killed, so is brought in, but they are only left with the vague hunch that his son could be a suspect. Maya takes Lily to the park, meeting up with the Walkers, and she and Eddie make peace. She tells him about Claire's contact with the whistleblower, Corey, and wants him to be Lily's guardian if anything happens. Dark's wife Oona contacts Maya, worried that he disappeared six weeks ago, shortly after Claire's death but before Joe's. Maya asks Corey to search for Dark, insisting they need to find the connection between him and the murders. Abby and Dan corner Maya to ask about their mother's first pregnancy, showing the photo then revealing they met Alexander. They demand to know if they have another sibling, which she confirms, telling them he is around 19 now.
5	"Episode 5"	Nimer Rashed	Nina Metivier	1 January 2024
Eva shows up at Maya's upset, as her ex, Robby, has managed to hack a nanny cam and got incriminating photos. Realising someone could have hacked into her wifi and therefore planted the photo, Maya gets Shane to scan her house. Meanwhile, Abby finds a website which helps connect adopted people with their birth mothers. She is shocked to discover her half-brother is Louis, her football team's assistant coach. He explains he had connected with Claire, albeit briefly, shortly before her murder. Afterwards, Louis was unsure of how to approach them. Uncomfortable, she leaves. Maya visits the private school where Claire had taken Louis, which was the Burketts' alma mater. The headmaster finally reveals she had been asking about Theo Mora. He was a friend of Joe's who had died of alcohol poisoning on campus, a short time before Andrew's death. Maya interviews Theo's mother, who confirms he was Andrew's best friend but suspects foul play. She meets with Corey, who tells her about the pharmaceutical company being responsible for multiple deaths and confirms Dark has not resurfaced. They go together to look into Dark's storage space, which is in arrears, and find his body in a large freezer.
6	"Episode 6"	Nimer Rashed	Tom Farrelly	1 January 2024
Kierce is summoned into the station, as Maya reported finding Dark's body. His rookie partner wants to hold her, but Kierce's instincts tell him they can help each other. When Maya accuses him of receiving regular bribes from Judith, he takes her to his apartment to show how poor he is. At Eddie's, she updates him about Claire seeking Dark, then finding his body. Maya next seeks Christopher Swain, the Burketts' schoolmate. Kierce's AA sponsor Nicole who talked him out of jumping off a bridge also gets him to open up at a meeting and tell his fiancée Molly about his inexplicable declining health. Eddie and Abby finally open up about Louis, who he invites to dinner so that he can finally meet Dan and start to get to know each other. He also offers to reach out to his father for him. Maya is brought into the police station as AB+ blood was found in the trunk, so she fingers Corey as she suspects he is framing her. She gives them his two hideouts and they end up splitting up. Maya meanwhile gets Judith to help her get to Swain. At the exclusive rehab center, Christopher reveals that Joe killed Andrew.
7	"Episode 7"	David Moore	Danny Brocklehurst	1 January 2024
Christopher details Theo's and Andrew's deaths. After a football victory, five members of the team haze Theo, a common practice in exclusive schools. Joe ties him to a chair, and they use a funnel to pour copious amounts of alcohol down him until he dies. He swore everyone to secrecy, but when the group is out on the Burkett yacht, Andrew insists they confess. Later, while everyone else is below deck, Christopher hears Joe throw him overboard. Corey is found, and Kierce gets him into a sound-proofed room, so he tells him about the Burketts' pharmaceutical company killing patients and doctoring the side-effects percentages. The officer finally realises he has been hallucinating, as Nicole is his long dead fiancée, not his sponsor, and he confirms the medicine he has been taking is Burkett brand, explaining all his symptoms. Later, Kierce and Marty track down PJ, the son of coach Phil Dawson, because it was his motorcycle that was tied to the night Joe was killed. With Kierce chasing and cornering him on a roof, PJ admits he and his friend Rambo were in the park the night Joe died, but they heard gunshots and fled the scene. Despite his innocence, Phil helped him cover up his presence there. Suddenly, Kierce has a dizzy spell while still on the roof. PJ tries to help Kierce keep his balance, but PJ falls off the roof instead, surviving the fall because of an awning, although he is injured and rushed to hospital. The accident results in Kierce being suspended from the police force, but he tracks down Rambo anyway, who claims he knows who shot Joe. Meanwhile, Maya goes into stealth mode, getting a burner phone and a disguise. Having put a tracker on Izabella's husband's truck, she corners them in a parking garage. Izabella reveals they did a deep fake on her, videoing him dressed in Joe's shirt, then superimposing Joe's face. Just as Maya gets them into their trunk, Shane appears over her erratic behavior. She explains she had asked him to test the bullet to confirm who had killed Claire. Questioned by Shane, Maya shockingly reveals herself as Joe's true murderer.
8	"Episode 8"	David Moore	Danny Brocklehurst	1 January 2024
Maya explains that once she had returned, she became suspicious of Joe, hence the testing of the bullet. She called Joe, asking him to meet her at the park. Unbeknownst to him, she had switched the operable Glock for the deactivated one. When Maya says she will not rest until justice is served, Joe tries to shoot her dead. She hits him with three bullets to make it look like a robbery, then hugs him to stain her clothes with his blood. Kierce finds and threatens the second biker present in the park when Joe was killed, who identifies Maya as the killer. He catches up to her, so she tells him everything. Kierce goes off to talk to Corey, while Maya faces the Burketts. After listing the numerous people's deaths Joe was responsible for (Theo, Andrew, Claire and Dark) she admits to having killed him. Judith suggests they pin everything on Joe, so they all can start with a clean slate. Maya refuses, so Neil shoots her dead. She secretly had Corey and Kierce livestream the incident via a nanny cam, ensuring the Burketts seal their fate. 18 years later, everyone gathers at the hospital to meet Lily's newborn daughter, Maya.

== Production ==
=== Development ===
The series is set in the United Kingdom as opposed to the American setting of the novel. Coben, who wrote the original novel, was an executive producer on the show. It is one of several adaptations of Coben's work by Netflix. Danny Brocklehurst was head writer and executive producer, and Nicola Shindler and Richard Fee were executive producers via Quay Street Productions. The episodes were directed by David Moore and Nimer Rashed.

=== Filming ===
Filming began in Manchester, England, in February 2023, and other locations in the northwest, with additional filming in Spain. Production wrapped in August 2023.

== Release ==
The series has been available worldwide on Netflix since 1 January 2024. Eight episodes were released.

== Reception ==
The show has received mixed reviews by the critics. The review aggregator website Rotten Tomatoes reported a 71% approval rating with an average rating of 5.3/10, based on 17 critic reviews. The website's critics consensus reads, "Fool Me Once's reliance on twists might be too much a turnoff for some to check it out twice, but game performances by Michelle Keegan and Joanna Lumley ensure that there'll be no shame for those who stick around". Metacritic calculated a weighted average of 55 out of 100 based on 4 reviews, indicating "mixed or average" reviews. Within its first week, it was watched by over 37.1 million Netflix accounts with over 238 million hours watched, one of the largest debuts of Netflix. All episodes appeared in the BARB Top 50 most viewed programmes of the week, with the opening episode attracting 6.34 million viewers, making the Top 10.

Keegan was nominated for Drama Performance with the show nominated for New Drama at the 29th National Television Awards.
