= Fool Me Once (Coben novel) =

2016 novel by Harlan Coben

- First edition
- Author: Harlan Coben
- Language: English
- Genre: Thriller, mystery, suspense
- Publisher: Dutton
- Publication date: March 22, 2016
- Publication place: United States
- Media type: Print (hardback, paperback), E-book, audiobook
- Pages: 400
- ISBN: 978-0525955092

Fool Me Once is a mystery-thriller novel by American writer Harlan Coben, published in 2016. It follows a former military pilot caught in a twisted story of power, corruption and murder.

== Plot ==
Maya Burkett, a former special operations pilot, is haunted by the violent deaths of her husband Joe and her sister Claire. Set in modern-day New York and New Jersey, the narrative weaves Maya's past with her present. Her husband's murder is believed to be a robbery gone awry, while the murder of her sister is also unresolved.

She discovers footage on her nanny camera showing her supposedly deceased husband interacting with their daughter, Lily. Desperate for answers, Maya confronts the nanny, Isabella, who in turn attacks her and steals the memory card. Maya cannot trust the police, as the detective on Joe's case seems shady. This leads her into a web of deceit and corruption involving her family and the influential Burkett clan. Maya uncovers dark secrets about her husband's past, his family's illegal investments, and how far they will go to protect their legacy. During a confrontation at the Burkett estate, truths are revealed and allegiances are tested.

In the end, Maya is revealed as her husband's killer, as he was the one who murdered her sister. In retaliation, her husband’s brother then shoots her dead. The narrative culminates with a reflection on Maya's character, her choices, and the mark she leaves on her family's future, symbolized by the birth of her granddaughter.

== Production ==
Harlan Coben's Fool Me Once was released on March 22, 2016, by Dutton, and available in hardcover, paperback, e-book, and audiobook formats.

== Reception ==
Fool Me Once has received widespread acclaim from critics and readers. The Florida Times-Union regarded it as one of Coben's best works. However, some reviews, such as those from Jen Ryland and Debbish, pointed out complexities in character development and certain plot points, while still acknowledging the novel's overall appeal.

== Adaptations ==
The novel was adapted into an eight part series by Quay Street Productions, adapted by Danny Brocklehurst. It premiered on Netflix on 1 January 2024. The series features Michelle Keegan, Dino Fetscher, Richard Armitage and Joanna Lumley. The series relocated the story from the US to the UK.
