= Harlan Coben =

American author (born 1962)

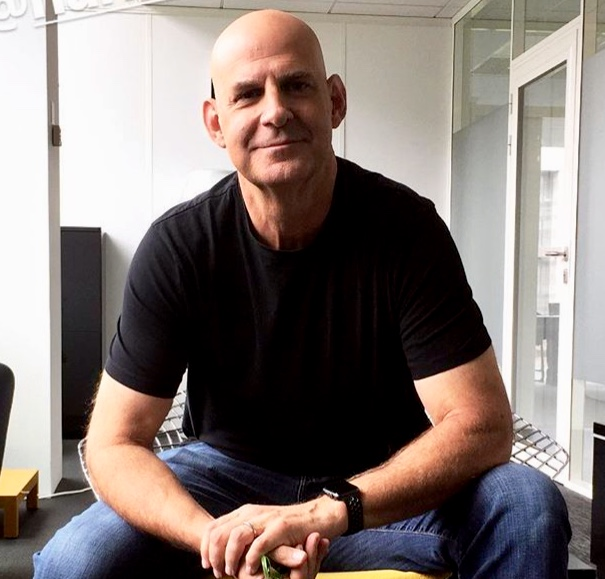
- Born: January 4, 1962 (age 64); Newark, New Jersey, U.S.
- Education: Amherst College
- Occupation: Author
- Spouse: Anne Helen Armstrong
- Children: 4
- Writing career
- Period: 1990–present
- Genres: Mystery, thriller
- Notable work: Myron Bolitar series of novels
- Notable awards: Anthony Award (1996), Edgar Award and Shamus Award (1997)
- Website: harlancoben.com

Harlan Coben (born January 4, 1962) is an American writer.

Coben has won an Edgar Award, a Shamus Award, and an Anthony Award. His books have been translated into 46 languages and sold more than 90 million copies.

== Early life and education ==
Harlan Coben was born on January 4, 1962, into a Jewish family in Newark, New Jersey, and was raised in Livingston, where he graduated from Livingston High School with future governor Chris Christie. His brother is the businessman Lawrence S. Coben.

He studied political science at Amherst College, where he was a member of the Psi Upsilon fraternity. At College, he lived next door to David Foster Wallace and was Fraternity Brothers with Dan Brown, who he is still good friends with.

== Career ==
After graduating in 1984, Coben worked in the travel industry, in a company owned by his grandfather. He wrote his first book, romantic suspense thriller Play Dead, which was accepted and published in 1990. It was followed by Miracle Cure in 1991. He then began writing a series of thrillers featuring a former basketball player turned sports agent, Myron Bolitar, who often investigates murders involving his clients.

Tell No One, a stand-alone thriller, was published in 2001. A French film adaptation was released in 2006. Hold Tight, published on April 15, 2008, was his first book to debut at number 1 on the New York Times Best Seller list.

In 2003, Coben published a short story about his father, who died of a heart attack at the age of 59 in 1988. Titled "The Key to My Father," the story was published in The New York Times on Father's Day, June 15, 2003.

In 2025, Coben published his first co-authored novel, Gone Before Goodbye, with Reese Witherspoon.

In October 2026, Coben was a guest on the long running BBC Radio 4 series Desert Island Discs.

== Recognition and awards ==
Coben's books have been translated into 46 languages and sold more than 90 million copies. He has won an Edgar Award, a Shamus Award, and an Anthony Award.

In 2010, Live Wire won a Spanish crime fiction award, the RBA Prize for Crime Writing, worth €125,000.

In 2023, the Japanese edition of Win, translated by Toshiki Taguchi, was nominated for the Mystery Writers of Japan Award for Mystery Fiction in Translation.

=== List of nominations and wins ===
Work	Year & Award	Category	Result	Ref.
Deal Breaker	1996 Anthony Awards	Paperback Original	Won	
Deal Breaker	1996 Edgar Allan Poe Award	Paperback Original	Shortlisted	
Fade Away	1997 Anthony Awards	Paperback Original	Nominated	
Fade Away	1997 Barry Award	Paperback Original	Nominated	
Fade Away	1997 Dilys Award		Nominated	
Fade Away	1997 Edgar Allan Poe Award	Paperback Original	Won	
Fade Away	1997 Shamus Award	P.I. Paperback Original	Won	
Back Spin	1998 Barry Award	Paperback Original	Won	
Back Spin	1998 Dilys Award		Nominated	
Back Spin	1998 Shamus Award	P.I. Paperback Original	Nominated	
"A Simple Philosophy"	1999 Anthony Awards	Short Story	Nominated	
"A Simple Philosophy"	1999 Macavity Awards	Mystery Short Story	Finalist	
Tell No One	2002 Anthony Awards	Novel	Nominated	
Tell No One	2002 Macavity Awards	Mystery Novel	Finalist	
Tell No One	2002 Edgar Allan Poe Award	Novel	Shortlisted	
Tell No One	2002 Barry Award	Novel	Nominated	
Tell No One	2002 Audie Awards	Mystery	Won	
Tell No One	2003 Grand prix des lectrices de Elle	Crime Fiction	Won	
The Woods	2007 Crime Writers' Association	Ian Fleming Steel Dagger	Shortlisted	
Hold Tight	2009 International Thriller Writers Awards	Thriller of the Year	Nominated	
Hold Tight	2009 Crimefest Awards	Sounds of Crime Award	Nominated	
Long Lost	2010 International Thriller Writers Awards	Hardcover Novel	Nominated	
Live Wire	2010 RBA Prize for Crime Writing		Won	
Live Wire	2011 Goodreads Choice Awards	Mystery & Thriller	Nominated	
Shelter	2011 Agatha Award	Children/Young Adult Fiction	Nominated	
Shelter	2012 Edgar Allan Poe Award	Young Adult Novel	Shortlisted	
Shelter	2014 Rhode Island Teen Book Award		Nominated	
Caught	2011 Edgar Allan Poe Award	Novel	Shortlisted	
Seconds Away	2012 Agatha Award	Children/Young Adult Fiction	Nominated	
Stay Close	2012 Goodreads Choice Awards	Mystery & Thriller	Nominated	
Six Years	2013 Goodreads Choice Awards	Mystery & Thriller	Nominated	
Found	2014 Agatha Award	Children/Young Adult Fiction	Nominated	
Missing You	2014 Goodreads Choice Awards	Mystery & Thriller	Nominated	
Missing You	2015 Audie Awards	Mystery	Nominated	
The Stranger	2015 Goodreads Choice Awards	Mystery & Thriller	Nominated	
The Stranger	2015 Hammett Prize		Nominated	
Fool Me Once	2016 Goodreads Choice Awards	Mystery & Thriller	Nominated	
Home	2017 Audie Awards	Thriller or Suspense	Nominated	
Don't Let Go	2018 Audie Awards	Thriller or Suspense	Nominated	
Run Away	2019 Goodreads Choice Awards	Mystery & Thriller	Nominated	
The Boy from the Woods	2020 Goodreads Choice Awards	Mystery & Thriller	Nominated	
The Boy from the Woods	2021 Barry Award	Novel	Nominated	
Win	2023 Mystery Writers of Japan Award	Mystery Fiction in Translation/Double Copper Award	Nominated	
I Will Find You	2024 Audie Awards	Thriller or Suspense	Nominated	
	2009 Crime Thriller Awards	ITV3 Writer's Award for Favourite Crime Genre Author (Public Vote)	Won	
	2013 Crime Thriller Awards	ITV3 Crime Thriller Living Legends	Nominated	
	2017 New Jersey Hall of Fame	Arts & Letters	Inducted	
	2019 International Thriller Writers Awards	Silver Bullet Award	Won	

== Adaptations ==
Coben's first book to be adapted for the screen was Tell No One. Director Guillaume Canet made a French-language film, based on the book, titled Ne le dis à personne, in 2006.

Coben's 2003 book No Second Chance became the basis for the 2015 French miniseries of the same name. Two years later the same happened to Just One Look.

Coben is the creator of the British crime drama television show The Five, which first aired in April 2016 on the Sky 1 channel in the United Kingdom. Coben also created the French-British crime drama television show Safe, which premiered on Netflix in 190 countries on May 10, 2018.

Coben often acts as executive producer on his television series, frequently through his company Final Twist Productions and Quay Street Productions.

Several other television adaptations of Coben's work have since been made, in addition to original programming.

== Film and TV series ==
=== Early adaptations ===
The first of Coben's works to receive the screen treatment was his 2001 novel Tell No One, which was adapted into a 2006 French film of the same name. The film was a box office success and was widely praised, being nominated for nine César Awards, and winning four. Two further novels were adapted as miniseries for France's TF1 broadcaster: 2015's No Second Chance and 2017's Just One Look.

The 2016 Sky1 drama The Five was an original series created by Coben, who followed suit with the C8/Netflix show Safe.

=== Netflix ===
In August 2018, following the success of Safe, Coben signed a multi-million-dollar, five-year contract with Netflix. Under the deal, 14 of his novels would be developed into series or films, with him serving as executive producer on all of them. The first one was The Stranger which premiered in January 2020. In October 2022, Netflix extended the deal for another four years, with the Myron Bolitar novel series now also available for adaptation. On February 20, 2023, Fool Me Once was announced as an upcoming adaptation in production for Netflix. As of June 2026, in addition to the original Safe, 12 series have been released under the Netflix deal; the series have been produced in different countries, with six in English, three in Polish, two in Spanish, and one in French as the original languages. Myron Bolitar and The Woods English-language television series adaptations are also in the works at Netflix.

=== Others ===
In 2022, Amazon Studios announced plans to produce a series based on the first Mickey Bolitar novel, Shelter. Jaden Michael stars as Mickey, alongside Constance Zimmer, Adrian Greensmith, Abby Corrigan, and Sage Linder. The series, Harlan Coben's Shelter, was released on August 18, 2023. In 2025, Prime Video released the series Lazarus, based on an original concept by Coben.

As of 2026, Coben hosts the true crime documentary series Harlan Coben's Final Twist for CBS.

=== List of films ===
Title (English & LOTE)		Country of origin	Language	Director	Release	Ref
Tell No One	(French: Ne le dis à personne)	France	French	Guillaume Canet	November 1, 2006	

=== List of TV series ===
Title (English & LOTE)		Country of origin	Language	Season(s)	Episodes	Premiere	Finale	Platform	Ref
No Second Chance	(French: Une chance de trop)	France	French	1	6	October 15, 2015	October 29, 2015	TF1	
The Five	—N/a	United Kingdom	English	1	10	April 15, 2016	May 13, 2016	Sky One	
Just One Look (FR)	(French: Juste un regard)	France	French	1	6	June 7, 2017	June 29, 2017	TF1	
Safe	—N/a	United Kingdom	English	1	8	May 10, 2018		C8, Netflix	
The Stranger	—N/a	United Kingdom	English	1	8	January 30, 2020		Netflix	
The Woods (PL)	(Polish: W głębi lasu)	Poland	Polish	1	6	June 12, 2020		Netflix	
The Innocent (ES)	(Spanish: El inocente)	Spain	Spanish	1	8	April 30, 2021		Netflix	
Gone for Good	(French: Disparu à jamais)	France	French	1	5	August 13, 2021		Netflix	
Stay Close	—N/a	United Kingdom	English	1	8	December 31, 2021		Netflix	
Hold Tight	(Polish: Zachowaj spokój)	Poland	Polish	1	6	April 22, 2022		Netflix	
Shelter	—N/a	United States	English	1	8	August 18, 2023	September 22, 2023	Amazon Prime Video	
Fool Me Once	—N/a	United Kingdom	English	1	8	January 1, 2024		Netflix	
Missing You	—N/a	United Kingdom	English	1	5	January 1, 2025		Netflix	
Just One Look (PL)	(Polish: Tylko jedno spojrzenie)	Poland	Polish	1	6	March 5, 2025		Netflix	
Caught	(Spanish: Atrapados)	Argentina	Spanish	1	6	March 26, 2025		Netflix	
Lazarus	—N/a	United Kingdom	English	1	6	October 22, 2025		Amazon Prime Video	
Run Away	—N/a	United Kingdom	English	1	8	January 1, 2026		Netflix	
I Will Find You	—N/a	United States	English	1	8	June 18, 2026		Netflix	
Harlan Coben's Final Twist (documentary)	—N/a	United States	English	2	12	January 4, 2026	present	CBS	
Myron Bolitar	—N/a	United States	English	TBA	TBA	TBA		Netflix	
The Woods (EN)	—N/a	United Kingdom	English	1	8	TBA		Netflix	
The Innocent (EN)	—N/a	United States	English	1	TBA	TBA		Netflix	

== Personal life ==
Coben lives in Ridgewood, New Jersey, with his wife, Anne Armstrong-Coben, a pediatrician, and their four children. They met because they were both on the basketball team at Amhurst College. They started dating in 1982 and were married in 1988. His daughter, Charlotte, wrote two episodes of the TV series Run Away, of which he is an executive producer. They have also worked together on Dead Hot, Fool Me Once, and Harlan Coben's Shelter.

== Published works ==
Series	Year	Title
Myron Bolitar	1995	Deal Breaker
Myron Bolitar	1996	Drop Shot
Myron Bolitar	1996	Fade Away
Myron Bolitar	1997	Back Spin
Myron Bolitar	1998	One False Move
Myron Bolitar	1999	The Final Detail
Myron Bolitar	2000	Darkest Fear
Myron Bolitar	2006	Promise Me
Myron Bolitar	2009	Long Lost
Myron Bolitar	2011	Live Wire
Myron Bolitar	2016	Home
Myron Bolitar	2024	Think Twice
Mickey Bolitar (1st Myron Bolitar spin-off series)	2011	Shelter
Mickey Bolitar (1st Myron Bolitar spin-off series)	2012	Seconds Away
Mickey Bolitar (1st Myron Bolitar spin-off series)	2014	Found
Sami Kierce	2016	Fool Me Once
Sami Kierce	2025	Nobody's Fool
Wilde	2020	The Boy from the Woods
Wilde	2022	The Match
Windsor Horne Lockwood III (2nd Myron Bolitar spin-off series)	2021	Win
Standalone novels	1990	Play Dead
Standalone novels	1991	Miracle Cure
Standalone novels	2001	Tell No One
Standalone novels	2002	Gone for Good
Standalone novels	2003	No Second Chance
Standalone novels	2004	Just One Look
Standalone novels	2005	The Innocent
Standalone novels	2007	The Woods
Standalone novels	2008	Hold Tight
Standalone novels	2010	Caught
Standalone novels	2012	Stay Close
Standalone novels	2013	Six Years
Standalone novels	2014	Missing You
Standalone novels	2015	The Stranger
Standalone novels	2016	The Magical Fantastical Fridge
Standalone novels	2017	Don't Let Go
Standalone novels	2019	Run Away
Standalone novels	2023	I Will Find You
Standalone novels	2025	Gone Before Goodbye
Non-fiction works	2026	Plot Twist: Life, Craft, and the Messy First Draft: A Memoir About Writing
