= Gone for Good (novel) =

Crime novel

- First edition (US)
- Author: Harlan Coben
- Language: English
- Genre: Crime novel, mystery
- Publisher: Delacorte Press (US); Orion (UK)
- Publication date: Apr 2002 (US); May 2002 (UK)
- Publication place: United States
- Media type: Print (hardcover)
- Pages: 352 pp (first edition, hardback)

Gone for Good is the fourth stand-alone novel by American crime writer Harlan Coben, published in 2002.

== Plot summary ==
As a boy, Will Klein had a hero: his older brother, Ken. Then, on a warm suburban night in the Kleins' affluent New Jersey neighborhood, a young woman—a girl Will had once loved—was found raped and murdered in her family's basement. The prime suspect: Ken Klein. With the evidence against him overwhelming, Ken simply vanished, spending the next decade as the elusive subject of rumors, speculation, and an international manhunt. When his shattered family never heard from Ken again, they were sure he was gone for good.

Now, eleven years have passed. And Will, who always believed in his brother's innocence, has found evidence that Ken is alive—even as he is struck by another act of betrayal. His girlfriend suddenly disappears, leaving behind compelling evidence that she was not the person Will thought she was. As the two dark dramas unwind around him, Will is pulled into a violent mystery, haunted by signs that Ken is trying to contact him after all these years. Will can feel himself coming closer and closer to his brother... and to a terrible secret that someone will kill to keep buried. And as the lies begin to unravel, Will is uncovering startling truths about his lover, his brother, and even himself.

== Other media ==
It was announced in 2013 that it was set to be adapted into a TV series by NBC. In 2021 it was adapted by Netflix into a five-part drama set in France. It was released internationally by Netflix in August 2021.
