= Dinnerstein =

Dinnerstein is a surname. Notable people with the surname include:

- Dorothy Dinnerstein (1923–1992), American feminist
- Harvey Dinnerstein (1928–2022), American figurative artist and educator
- Leonard Dinnerstein (1934–2019), American historian
- Simon Dinnerstein (born 1943), American figurative artist and educator
- Simone Dinnerstein (born 1972), American classical pianist
