= Adrian Greensmith =

American actor

- Born: 2001 or 2002 (age 24–25); Brooklyn, NY
- Education: Royal Central School of Speech and Drama
- Occupation: Actor
- Years active: 2019–present
- Family: Simone Dinnerstein (mother); Jeremy Greensmith (father); Simon Dinnerstein (grandfather); Harvey Dinnerstein (great-uncle)

Adrian Greensmith is an American actor. He is known for his starring roles as Hunter in the Netflix film Metal Lords (2022) and as Arthur "Spoon" Spindell on the Amazon Prime Video television series Harlan Coben's Shelter (2023).

== Early life ==
Adrian Greensmith was raised in Park Slope, Brooklyn, where he attended P.S. 321. His mother, Simone Dinnerstein, is an American classical pianist also from Park Slope, and his English father, Jeremy Greensmith, is a former journalist and a fifth-grade teacher at P.S. 321. His maternal grandfather, Simon Dinnerstein, and maternal great-uncle, Harvey Dinnerstein, were both figurative artists; Harvey died in 2022.

At 11 years old, Greensmith played electric guitar in a band called the Animation. He later learned how to play jazz and classical guitar. By 2021, he had begun studying at the Royal Central School of Speech and Drama in London.

== Career ==
Greensmith made his onscreen debut in the music video for American singer Whitney Woerz's 2019 song "Little Bit More". Greensmith made his feature film debut in the 2022 Netflix film Metal Lords, which was written by D. B. Weiss, directed by Peter Sollett. It starred Greensmith as Hunter Sylvester, an abrasive high school outcast and metalhead who starts the heavy metal band Skullfucker with his best friend, Kevin (played by Jaeden Martell). IGN's Matt Fowler praised Greensmith's performance as "quite good", while John Anderson of The Wall Street Journal wrote that it had an "unhinged magic".

Greensmith then starred as the teenage hacker Arthur "Spoon" Spindell in the mystery television series Harlan Coben's Shelter, which was based on the 2011 Harlan Coben novel of the same name and premiered on Amazon Prime Video in August 2023. Elijah Gonzalez of Paste wrote, "In particular, Adrian Greensmith's performance as Spoon leaves a great impression, with his mixture of quirk, Gen-Z humor, and empathy making him the heart of this crew." The Standard's William Mata called him the "pick of the bunch" from the cast for "making the nerdy Spoon likeable when he could be irritating in the wrong hands", Den of Geek's Louisa Mellor called Greensmith the show's "MVP", and Peter Travers wrote for ABC News that Greensmith was "hilarious" in the role. In November 2023, it was announced that Shelter would not return for a second season.

Greensmith had a guest appearance as Galileo Galilei in the science fiction television series 3 Body Problem, which premiered on Netflix in March 2024. He also had a recurring role as Sam Greene, a college student and the son of protagonist Simon Greene (played by James Nesbitt), in the Netflix miniseries Run Away. The series was based on Coben's novel of the same name and premiered in January 2026.

== Filmography ==
=== Television ===
| Year | Title | Role | Notes |
|---|---|---|---|
| 2023 | Harlan Coben's Shelter | Arthur "Spoon" Spindell | Main role; 8 episodes |
| 2024 | 3 Body Problem | Galileo Galilei | Episode: "Destroyer of Worlds" |
| 2026 | Run Away | Sam Greene | Recurring role; 8 episodes |

=== Film ===
| Year | Title | Role |
|---|---|---|
| 2022 | Metal Lords | Hunter |

=== Music videos ===
| Year | Title | Artist |
|---|---|---|
| 2019 | "Little Bit More" | Whitney Woerz |
