= Red Rose (TV series) =

BBC Three television drama

- Genre: Horror drama
- Created by: Michael and Paul Clarkson
- Written by: Michael and Paul Clarkson
- Directed by: Ramón Salazar (eps. 1–2); Henry Blake (eps. 3–5); Lisa Siwe (eps. 6–8)
- Composers: Jessica Jones; Tim Morrish
- Country of origin: United Kingdom
- No. of series: 1
- No. of episodes: 8

Production
- Executive producers: Paul Clarkson; Michael Clarkson; Joel Wilson; Carissa Hope Lynch; Jamie Campbell; Nawfal Faizullah; Mona Qureshi; Olivia Trench
- Producer: Camilla Bray
- Production locations: Bolton, England
- Running time: 45 minutes
- Production company: Eleven Film

Original release
- Network: BBC Three
- Release: 15 August – 6 September 2022

Red Rose is a 2022 British horror drama television series about on the teenage angst experienced in varying degrees within a group of young people obsessed with their smartphones. Created by Michael and Paul Clarkson and produced by Eleven, it was broadcast on BBC Three from 15 August 2022 and available on BBC iPlayer in full from that date in the United Kingdom, and available on Netflix internationally and the United Kingdom on 15 February 2023.

== Premise ==
Set in Bolton, this series revolves around a group of friends in the town as they plan to have one more carefree summer before heading off to university. Their plans are immediately thwarted as a sense of danger looms over the group when an app called "Red Rose" is downloaded, and makes sinister demands that end in deadly consequences if not followed.

== Cast ==
=== Main ===
- Isis Hainsworth as Rochelle "Roch" Mason, leader of the Dickheads clique
- Amelia Clarkson as Wren Davies, Roch's best friend
- Natalie Blair as Ashley "Ash" Banister
- Ali Khan as Tariq "Taz" Sadiq, a new member of the Dickheads invited by Roch
- Ellis Howard as Antony "Ant" Longwell
- Harry Redding as Noah Royston, Wren's boyfriend
- Ashna Rabheru as Jaya Mahajan

=== Supporting ===
- Adam Nagaitis as Rick Bennet
- Natalie Gavin as Rachel Davies
- Samuel Anderson as Vinny Mason
- Hannah Griffiths as Big Jenna
- Silvie Furneaux as Little Jenna
- Ruaridh Mollica as Patrick Hume
- Emma Fryer as Jennifer
- Jennifer Hennessy as Andrea Longwell
- Nia Roberts as Shelley Royston
- Rod Hallett as Simon
- Ellie James as Gloria Mason
- Poppy Jhakra as Mrs Mahajan
- Graeme Hawley as Dave Banister
- Charlie Hiscock as Jacob Taylor
- Tom Rosenthal as Douglas Sensei
- Daniel Coll as Officer Warren

== Episodes ==
All episodes were made available on BBC iPlayer on the morning of 15 August 2022, before their linear broadcast.

No.	Title	Directed by	Written by	BBC Three airdate
1	"It's Grim Up North"	Ramon Salazar	Michael and Paul Clarkson	15 August 2022
Six months after the suicide of a popular wealthy girl in the affluent section of Manchester, a girl burdened with hardships downloads an app called "Red Rose" as a companionship for the summer break, unaware of the insidious carnage it will cause for her and her friends that summer.
2	"The Garden"	Ramon Salazar	Michael and Paul Clarkson	16 August 2022
As summer begins, Roch's life begins spiraling as Red Rose (RR) begins to play dangerous mind games on her and begins to dig deep into her psychosis by causing a rift between her friends and putting her family at risk.
3	"Scapegoat"	Henry Blake	Tolula Dada	22 August 2022
Still grieving over Roch's death, Wren and the rest of the gang decide to give in and play one of RR's games with a very public display of its powers and the consequences.
4	"Manchester Innit"	Henry Blake	Gemma Hurley	23 August 2022
The group is invited to Manchester to find out more about RR.
5	"Lockdown"	Henry Blake	Poppy Cogan	29 August 2022
As the group decides to go "device-free" for a day to avoid any chaos from RR, the app has other plans for them as it reveals another trick under its sleeve.
6	"Results Day"	Lisa Siwe	Michael and Paul Clarkson	30 August 2022
Two months have passed since Simon's death and RR has been dormant ever since. The crew tries to turn a new page as they get their test results, and try to remember Roch. However, Jaya and Antony think RR is not over.
7	"I Heart BLTN"	Lisa Siwe	Michael and Paul Clarkson	6 September 2022
With one friend dead and another one in the hospital, Wren, Noah, Taz, and Antony are pitted against each other as they try to protect one another while also trying to protect themselves. They realize that no one can be trusted.
8	"The Gardener"	Lisa Siwe	Michael and Paul Clarkson	6 September 2022
With summer coming to a close, Wren and her friends race against the clock in the final face-off with RR and uncover the devastating story of the app.

== Production ==
The series is a co-production between Eleven and Entertainment One (eOne) for BBC Three and Netflix. eOne controls international distribution. It was directed by Ramón Salazar (eps. 1–2), Henry Blake (eps. 3–5), and Lisa Siwe (eps. 6–8), and produced by Camilla Bray.

The series was first announced in August 2019, with the intention being for a BBC Three premiere and BBC One broadcast (at the time, BBC Three primarily held an online presence, with a supplementary, branded late-night programming block on BBC One featuring its content). The acquisition of international rights by Netflix was confirmed in February 2020.

=== Casting and filming ===
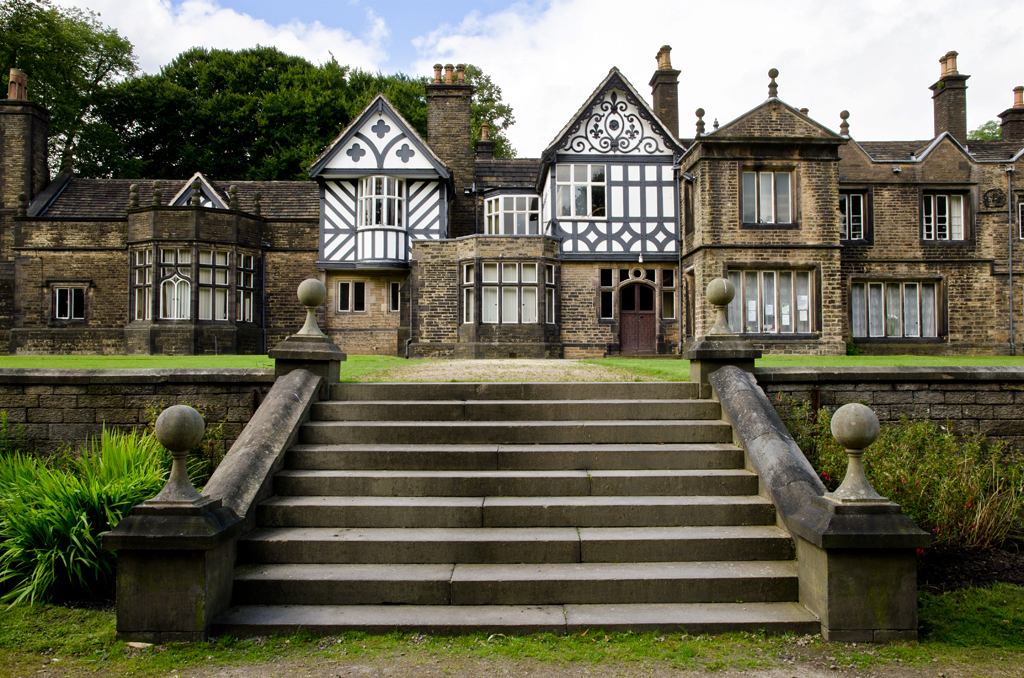
Parts of the series were filmed at Smithills Hall in a suburb of Bolton

Filming was originally scheduled for a June 2020 start, but was delayed into 2021, taking place in and around Bolton and Manchester in the latter half of the year; Queens Park in Bolton in early June, Churchgate (including Ye Olde Man & Scythe) in late July, Halliwell in September, Farnworth and Kearsley in October and around Bridge Street in Bolton in November. Other filming locations included Bolton town centre, the West Pennine Moors, and Le Mans Crescent in Bolton for scenes in the final episode of the series, as well as Queens Park, Bridge Street, Scout Road, Church Road between Farnworth and Kearsley, Westhoughton, Wilton Quarries between Belmont Road and Scout Road, Smithills Hall, and Bolton Town Hall (which features in episodes towards the end of the series). According to The Bolton News, writers the Clarkson twins "hope that this will give their series a ring of authenticity, with the drama set as well filmed in the town", with Paul saying that "Writers do write what they know. We draw from inspirations from real life. This really is a love letter to Bolton. It is partly inspired by ourselves and our friendships and our family stories, some of which we think are very important to try and highlight. I don't think Bolton will be prepared to see itself in the way it's portrayed in Red Rose. It's not been shown like this. It's been portrayed in other forms of media like Alma's Not Normal as well as Peter Kay's work, but we brought that cinematic American energy lens to Bolton".

The Clarksons reported that there were some instances where they were unable to film in Bolton; "if we couldn't find anything appropriate for filming – for example we wanted to film at a certain public toilet in Bolton but they weren't large enough for filming, so we had to find something that was nearby, which was in Manchester."

The casting was announced in May 2022, with the writers acclaiming how they "have so brilliantly captured the spirit of the North with their nuanced, devastating and hilarious performances". The series was cast through an 'open casting call', with actress Hannah Griffiths commenting that, in auditioning for her role as 'Big Jenna', there were "a few different roles you could go for" and she "sent in [a] self-tape and got a call to go down to London for a chemistry meeting", before receiving the news of her success "around" two months later; the show is her first television appearance.

Actress Natalie Blair, born near to Bolton in Leigh, noted that "much of the cast would turn to [her] when perfecting accents and trying to grasp their characters", explaining she was "quite fortunate in the sense that I know the values that Boltonians have in family, in friendship and working hard for what you want. I definitely took that into my character for sure." Actor Ali Khan said that "[t]alking to some of the extras or locals as well, hearing how they speak can help subconsciously inform it. Most of the supporting artists were locals themselves so you'd talk to them, and they'd tell you things right", and actress Amelia Clarkson reported that "filming was often interrupted by kids shouting, but she was thankful as she used that energy to channel into her Boltonian character". Ellis Howard spoke of his enjoyment of filming on the moors near Bolton - and "how romantic and dark it is against an industrial town is so beautiful" - with Clarkson appreciating her time filming in the town's older buildings, such as it feeling "gothic" and "kind of terrifying" during shooting in Smithills Hall, and at night being "kind of scary but also it gave a lot of energy for us. Running around and being kids, which obviously helps with our performance".

=== Location and writing ===
The show was mentioned by BBC Three channel controller Fiona Campbell as part of the BBC's efforts to commission more shows outside of London, with BBC Three to "have new targets in place to order two-thirds of its content from beyond the capital", with many of the dramas - including Red Rose - invoked as she commented that what "unites these dramas is they are rooted in the reality of somewhere quite specific" and that she is "always thinking conceptually about what it's like being 22 years old and living in [South Yorkshire town] Doncaster, or [Northern Irish city] Derry, or [Scottish city] Aberdeen. We want dramas that replicate these experiences." Co-writer Paul Clarkson later commented on this, saying "It was something we fought for. It wasn't a given that that was going to happen ... By custom, everything takes place in London, but we were like, 'thanks for everything London but sit down now and let the regions start to be represented as the once were'", and that to "bring some representation to Bolton has been incredibly moving", with the show acting as a "love letter" to the town, and that the two have "tried to represent Bolton in all of its different characters. Both the urban side and the natural side, in terms of forest and its countryside." In an interview with The Bolton News, both Clarkson twins claimed that "their hometown is as much of a character as the rest", with Michael quoted as saying he "want[s] Bolton teens to watch this and feel like their lives are cinema-worthy, like they are film-worthy, because they are", with Paul adding that the two of them "have felt immense pressure making this show. Not because of the act of making the show. This is one of the first time the north will ever have been depicted like this and we wanted to make sure that no one would feel not proud of it."

I think any hometown that anyone has grown up in, if it's done its job, will become a character in their life. It's because it's got this beautiful combination of the moors and the town, it's got real voices and real people.

— Michael Clarkson to the BBC Writers' Room, when asked why it was "so important ... that the show is set in Bolton".

In an interview in The Guardian, they commented more on the multifaceted nature of the setting, observing how "everything is in a mix" - "you have the moors surrounding it, hills and forests, but then you've got council estates, industrial buildings, beautiful Victorian buildings, crumbling ruins; new things, old things". On the suitability of Bolton as the setting for the series, interviewer Jack Seale reported they "cite the Anglo-Irish community, the way different generations happily mix, residents' tendency to speak plainly, and the shared trauma of the town being 'an industrial Mecca that became a Thatcherite graveyard' as reasons why". Seale opined "[t]hat rounded sense of place informs an element of their writing that the twins are careful to repeatedly emphasise: they may specialise in fantasy and horror – what they refer to simply as "genre" – but they believe unreal, hyper-real or surreal stories depend on how believable the real part of them is". The Clarksons "consulted an expert who works on technology – a top-brain coder" to confirmed if the way the eponymous Red Rose app in the show could behave in the way it did.

The Clarksons' writing process is also varied, and that "like a lot of duos, they split scripts in two, write alone, then swap and edit the half the other brother has written". Paul Clarkson remarked further, claiming - with regards to having been inspired by various different writers, filmmakers and other television shows in their scripts - that "[s]tories are better when you use multiple brushes", and the show is "rich enough to have quite a ... buffet of concepts" as a result", as "[y]ou find you care more about the characters because you see them through different scenarios, situations, emotions." They said that the initial idea for Red Rose was formed six years ago when pitching for the soap Hollyoaks, and were asked what other suggestions they would have; Michael Clarkson reported they replied with "'Oh yeah, we've got something like Scream, it's set in Bolton, Scream and The Ring. Paul just looked at me and was like 'Yeah, and it's teenagers'". Paul spoke about how this pitch engaged with the "zeitgeist", how there "were elements of discussions going on about rogue apps on phones and for us it just felt right to unite the two", and how they bucked the trend as "[o]ften writers run away from technology in the horror genre", devices being sidelined through tropes such as a phone lacking signal, or being rendered unusable so writers "'don't have to deal with that'". He said that the two were eager to do the opposite; "'No, let's run headlong into this instead'".

=== Music ===
The original music was composed by English composers Jessica Jones and Tim Morrish, who also play as the duo Vanbur.

== Release and reception ==
The first episode of the series was first shown at two screenings held at The Light Cinema in Bolton on 9 August 2022, attended by the cast and crew. Alongside the event, the creators were part of a "masterclass" hosted by Katie Thistleton, in which attendees received advice on script-writing, details on the production of the show, and related career information.

All episodes were made available on BBC iPlayer on the morning of 15 August 2022, before their linear premiere, with two episodes shown a week on BBC Three, and both episodes repeated back-to-back late-night every Thursday on BBC One. (Note: The seventh and eighth episodes did not receive a BBC One broadcast; they were set to air on Thursday, September 8, when all primetime programmes were suspended in light of Queen Elizabeth II's death.)

=== Critical reception ===
Jack Seale from The Guardian, in a published interview with the show's creators prior to broadcast, called the series "an extraordinarily confident piece of work". Gerard Gilbert, for the i, also commended the drama, and said that "[h]orror is a tricky genre to get right, easily becoming either too creaky or too gory, but this new drama series from the producers of Sex Education smashes it."

In The Times, Gabriel Tate noted that although the show "may be derivative at times...it is distinguished by a keen sense of place, preference for slow-build tension over cheap gimmickry and, crucially, a deep empathy for its characters." Nicole Vassell, in her three-star review for The Independent, claimed the series "nails the complexities of teenage life" and the "talented young cast gives life to the dialogue, making the characters feel grounded in both their playful banter and their understandable fears", but "suffers from a clash of big ideas, all vying for our attention at any one time: virtual reality, ghosts, exorcisms, mental health struggles and poverty. The show seems as if it's uncertain of what it wants to be, and in its attempt to cover all bases of the thriller genre, the story becomes fuzzy" and it "would benefit from scaling back so we really feel the sense of panic". However, Vassell concluded by saying that "for all of its jarring moments, Red Rose is full of enticing intrigue; as much as the Bolton teens on screen, you'll find yourself wanting to know who's behind the sinister app – and how they can be stopped before anyone else gets hurt".

In a four-star review, Helen Brown of The Telegraph said the Clarksons "have given the series a real, gritty contrast to the fake-pretty app graphics by setting it in their Northern hometown, with its abandoned industrial buildings surrounded by moorland", and praised the plotline; "I wasn't sure that modern teenagers would turn to the church to fight the app's supernatural powers, as they do in Red Rose. Surely they'd have tried digital hacks before holy water? But then it's fun to see them pit old magic against new in this engaging clash of Ken Loach/Stephen King worlds".

Also in a four-star review, Stuart Jeffries, writing for The Guardian, called Red Rose "entertainingly disturbing", but criticised the anachronistic soundtrack of songs from the 1990s, quipping "If this is what the kids are getting down to this summer, they have bigger problems than bad grades". Emily Watkins' four-star review for i applauded the series for having "captured the internet's dizzying expanse of possibilities along with the astonishing bleakness of its deepest depths", and by "[d]rawing on a host of up-to-the-minute topics, Red Rose's first episode was both highly entertaining and startlingly thought-provoking. Great performances from the core cast (particularly Hainsworth) elevated Red Rose beyond the usual fare without sacrificing any watchability".

== Awards and nominations ==
Year	Award	Subject	Nominee	Result	Ref.
2023	Broadcast Digital Awards	Best Drama Programme	Red Rose	Nominated	
