= Isis Hainsworth =

Scottish actress (born 1998)

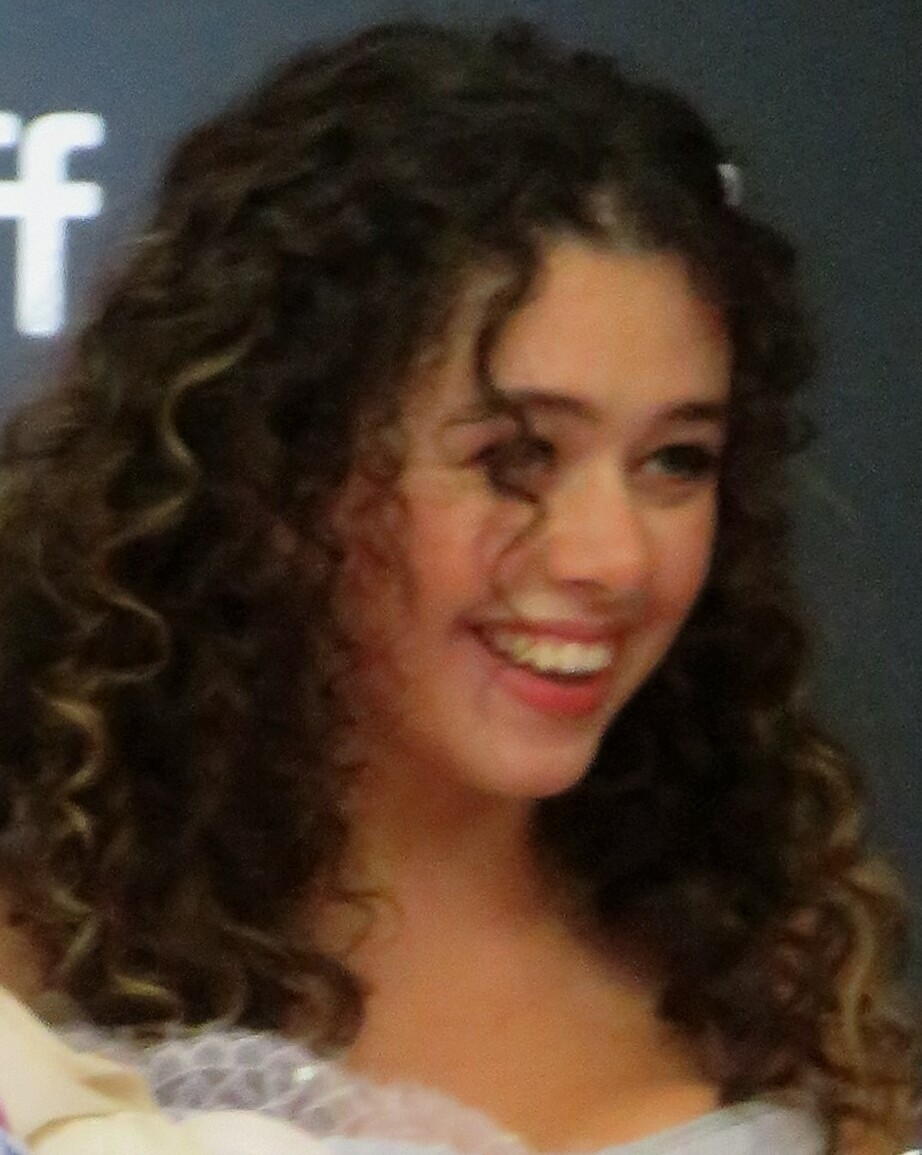
- Hainsworth in 2022
- Born: 22 September 1998 (age 27); Edinburgh, Scotland
- Occupation: Actress
- Years active: 2016–present

Isis Hainsworth (born 22 September 1998) is a Scottish actress. She began her career in the West End and has received an Ian Charleson Award and was nominated for a Laurence Olivier Award. On television, she is known for her role in the BBC Three horror series Red Rose (2022). Her films include Metal Lords (2022). She was named a 2022 Screen International Star of Tomorrow.

== Early life ==
Hainsworth was born to a Seychellois father Philly Angelo Collins and a Scottish mother Sula Hainsworth. Hainsworth attended Leith Walk Primary School and then Drummond Community High School. She took extracurricular Higher and Advanced Higher Drama classes at Leith Academy alongside her standard school courses at Drummond. She also joined local theatre groups Lothian Youth Arts & Musicals Company and Strange Town Theatre. It was through the latter that she was suggested for Our Ladies of Perpetual Succour. Shortly after completing school in 2016, Hainsworth moved to London for her career.

== Career ==
Hainsworth made her television debut in the 2016 with small roles in the BBC One miniseries One of Us (also known as Retribution) as Maddy and the ITV drama In Plain Sight. She took over the lead role of Orla from Melissa Allan in the stage adaptation of Our Ladies of Perpetual Succour when it moved to the Duke of York's Theatre in 2017.

Hainsworth played Michelle McCullen and Louise Graham in the BBC One miniseries Wanderlust (2018) and The Victim (2019) respectively, as well as Abigail Warren in the second series of Harlots. She appeared in Moonlight / Nightschool at the Harold Pinter Theatre. For her performance as Hermia in A Midsummer Night's Dream at the Bridge Theatre, Hainsworth was nominated for a 2019 Ian Charleson Award. She appeared in the 2020 films Emma. as Elizabeth Martin and Misbehaviour as Jenny.

In 2022, Hainsworth starred opposite Amelia Clarkson in the BBC Three horror series Red Rose as Rochelle Mason and alongside Jaeden Martell in the Netflix teen band film Metal Lords as Emily Spector. She also played Aelis in the Amazon Prime medieval comedy film Catherine Called Birdy.

For her 2025 performance as Isabella in Measure for Measure at the Royal Shakespeare Company, she received the Ian Charleson Award.

== Filmography ==
=== Film ===
Year	Title	Role	Notes
2019	The Yearning	Jess	Short film
2020	Emma.	Elizabeth Martin	
2020	Misbehaviour	Jenny	
2021	Lilias Adie	Maud	Short film
2022	Metal Lords	Emily Spector	Netflix film
2022	Catherine Called Birdy	Aelis	Amazon Prime film

=== Television ===
Year	Title	Role	Notes
2016	One of Us	Maddy	Miniseries
2016	In Plain Sight	Vivienne Watt	1 episode
2018	Harlots	Abigail Warren	4 episodes (series 2)
2018	Wanderlust	Michelle McCullen	Miniseries
2019	Les Misérables	Marie Claire	1 episode
2019	The Victim	Louise Graham	Miniseries
2022	Red Rose	Rochelle "Roch" Mason	Main role
2022	Skint	Mia	1 episode

== Stage ==
Year	Title	Role	Notes
2017	Our Ladies of Perpetual Succour	Orla	Duke of York's Theatre, London
2018	Moonlight / Nightschool	Bridget / Barbara	Harold Pinter Theatre, London
2019	A Midsummer Night's Dream	Hermia	Bridge Theatre, London
2023	Romeo and Juliet	Juliet	Almeida Theatre, London
2023–2024	The House of Bernarda Alba	Adela	National Theatre, London
2024	The Outrun	The Woman	Church Hill Theatre, Edinburgh
2025	Measure For Measure	Isabella	Royal Shakespeare Theatre, Stratford-upon-Avon
2026	Arcadia	Thomasina Coverley	The Old Vic, London

== Awards and nominations ==
Year	Award	Category	Work	Result	Ref.
2020	Ian Charleson Awards		A Midsummer Night's Dream	Nominated	
2026	Olivier Awards		Arcadia	Nominated	
2026	Ian Charleson Awards		Measure for Measure	Won	
