= Metal Lords =

2022 film by Peter Sollett

- Official release poster
- Directed by: Peter Sollett
- Written by: D. B. Weiss
- Produced by: Greg Shapiro; D. B. Weiss
- Starring: Jaeden Martell; Isis Hainsworth; Adrian Greensmith; Brett Gelman; Noah Urrea; Joe Manganiello
- Cinematography: Anette Haellmigk
- Edited by: Steve Edwards
- Music by: Ramin Djawadi
- Production companies: Bighead Littlehead; Kingsgate Films
- Distributed by: Netflix
- Release date: April 8, 2022
- Running time: 98 minutes
- Country: United States
- Language: English
- Budget: $42 million

Metal Lords is a 2022 American teen comedy-drama film written by D. B. Weiss and directed by Peter Sollett. Guitarist Tom Morello was an executive producer and wrote some of the songs performed in the film.

The story follows two high school best friends and metal music lovers, Hunter and Kevin, who set out to start a metal band, against societal norms.

The film was released on Netflix on April 8, 2022.

== Plot ==
Metalhead Hunter Sylvester jams with his best friend, introvert Kevin Schlieb, a drummer in the school marching band. During marching band practice, Kevin witnesses sensitive Scottish student Emily having a full meltdown and quitting band because of her lack of skill with the clarinet.

Later that day, Kevin drags Hunter to a party at Clay's house and tries to fit in while Hunter feels misplaced. Kevin gets drunk and flirts with a girl named Kendall, while Hunter gets into an altercation with jock Skip and derides Clay's band, Mollycoddle.

Learning that the school is holding a Battle of the Bands contest, Hunter registers his and Kevin's band, Skullfucker. Hunter steals his stepfather's credit card and buys an exorbitant amount of gear, including a full drum kit for Kevin.

Kevin adopts a grueling daily practice schedule after school. Learning Hunter's metal playlists by ear, he notices that Emily is a skilled cello player with equal dedication. The two bond over their shared passion, which prompts Kevin to give her a copy of the playlist. Meanwhile, Hunter auditions bassists to complete the trio but is unsuccessful and has an escalating series of run-ins with Skip.

Kevin unsuccessfully tries to pitch Emily as their new bassist, but Hunter rejects her outright. Kevin calls her to apologize for Hunter's behavior, and they have sex. Kevin and Emily become a couple, which enrages Hunter, who believes she will be their Yoko Ono.

While Kevin continues to hone his skills, Clay hears him practicing and immediately recognizes his advanced abilities and 'intense' drumming style; since Mollycoddle's drummer is in rehab, he asks Kevin to be their drummer for a performance at his sister's wedding. During speech class, Hunter mocks Emily until she attacks him, breaking his guitar in the process. This leads to an argument between Hunter and Kevin, leading to Kevin leaving the band.

As Kevin performs at the wedding reception, Hunter tries to crash it in full heavy metal costume but is arrested for trespassing. Clay commends Kevin for mastering the material on short notice and elevating their pop music covers with his techniques. He invites Kevin to hang out and join Mollycoddle for the Battle of the Bands, which Kevin reluctantly accepts.

A drunk Kendall invites Kevin into the hot tub and makes out with him. Kevin's conscience materializes as heavy metal musicians Scott Ian, Tom Morello, Kirk Hammett and Rob Halford. Prompted by the apparitions, Kevin realizes that he loves Emily so leaves to be with her. Kevin later discovers that Hunter's father sent him to rehab as punishment.

At the rehab clinic, Hunter meets his idol Dr. Troy Nix, former lead guitarist of metal band Killoton, the last Battle of the Bands champions. Nix explains that he became a doctor after rehabilitating from alcohol abuse, which itself was due to the dysfunction of being in a band with people he did not really like. Although Hunter is fit for discharge, clinic policy prevents him from leaving until Monday, after the contest has already taken place.

Kevin breaks Hunter and Mollycoddle's drummer out of the clinic. Hunter and Kevin go to Emily's, where Hunter apologizes and recognizes Emily's metal attitude, but she insists she is not ready to perform.

At the Battle of the Bands, Kevin apologizes to Clay, presenting Mollycoddle's now sober drummer to resume his position. Kevin and Hunter prepare to perform as a duo, when Emily joins them with an electric cello and goth metal gear. Principal Swanson warns them the name Skullfucker is inappropriate for the event, forcing Emily to quickly change it to Skullflower.

Despite initial skepticism, their performance wins over the crowd. During Hunter's guitar solo, an inebriated Skip stumbles out of a mosh pit, shoving Hunter into the amplifiers. They crash down, breaking Hunter's leg.

The band reads in the newspaper that their performance went viral, despite losing the Battle of the Bands, coming in second behind Mollycoddle. They conclude that they are the moral winners of the contest as the entire crowd loved them, sang the chorus of their original song, and they received more prominent media coverage. As an inclusive trio, they begin to practice with renewed vigor and camaraderie.

== Cast ==
- Jaeden Martell as Kevin
- Isis Hainsworth as Emily
- Adrian Greensmith as Hunter Sylvester
- Sufe Bradshaw as Dean Swanson
- Noah Urrea as Clay
- Analesa Fisher as Kendall
- Michelle Fang as Lisa
- Phelan Davis as Skip
- Brett Gelman as Dr. Sylvester
- Joe Manganiello as Dr. Troy Nix

In addition, metal musicians Scott Ian, Tom Morello, Kirk Hammett and Rob Halford appear in cameo roles as themselves, representing Kevin's conscience, while music critic and author on heavy metal, Chuck Klosterman, plays the school's band teacher.

== Production ==
Metal Lords was shot in Portland, Oregon. The school scenes were shot at Parkrose Middle School and Parkrose High School, while the Battle of the Bands scenes were filmed at Revolution Hall.

== Reception ==
On the review aggregator website Rotten Tomatoes, 62% of 47 critics' reviews are positive, with an average rating of 6.0/10. The website's consensus reads: "If it doesn't quite rawk, Metal Lords remains a good-natured and overall enjoyable look at adolescence and the life-altering power of music." Metacritic, which uses a weighted average, assigned the film a score of 59 out of 100, based on 20 critics, indicating "mixed or average" reviews.
