= Arcadia (play) =

1993 play by Tom Stoppard

- Cover of first edition
- Original language: English
- Written by: Tom Stoppard
- Subject: History, science, philosophy, mathematics, love, death
- Genre: Comedy-drama
- Setting: A Derbyshire country estate in both the past (1809, 1812) and "the present"

Premiere
- Date: 13 April 1993
- Place: Lyttelton Theatre; Royal National Theatre; London

Arcadia is a 1993 stage play written by English playwright Tom Stoppard, which explores the relationship between past and present, order and disorder, certainty and uncertainty. It has been praised by many critics as the finest play from "one of the most significant contemporary playwrights" in the English language. In 2006, the Royal Institution of Great Britain named it one of the best science-related works ever written.

== Synopsis ==
In 1809, Thomasina Coverly, the daughter of the house, is a precocious teenager with ideas about mathematics, nature, and physics well ahead of her time. She studies with her tutor Septimus Hodge, a friend of Lord Byron (an unseen guest in the house). In the present, writer Hannah Jarvis and literature professor Bernard Nightingale converge on the house: she is investigating a hermit who once lived on the grounds; he is researching a mysterious chapter in the life of Byron. As their studies unfold – with the help of Valentine Coverly, a post-graduate student in mathematical biology – the truth about what happened in Thomasina's time is gradually revealed.

=== Scene 1 (Act 1) ===
The play opens on 10 April 1809, in a garden-front room of the house. Septimus Hodge is trying to distract 13-year-old Thomasina from her curiosity about "carnal embrace" by challenging her to prove Fermat's Last Theorem; he also wants to focus on reading the poem "The Couch of Eros" by Ezra Chater, who with his wife is a guest at the house. Thomasina starts asking why jam mixed in rice pudding can never be unstirred, which leads her to the topic of determinism and to a nascent theory of chaotic shapes in nature. This is interrupted by Chater himself, who is angry that his wife was caught in the aforementioned "carnal embrace" with Septimus; he has come to demand a duel. Septimus tries to defuse the situation by heaping praise on Chater's "The Couch of Eros". The tactic works, because Chater does not know it was Septimus who had savaged an earlier work of his, "The Maid of Turkey". Landscape architect Richard Noakes enters, shortly accompanied by Captain Brice and Lady Croom; the three discuss proposed modifications to the Arcadian style gardens, while Thomasina sketches an imaginary hermit on Noakes' technical drawing of the garden.

=== Scene 2 ===
The present day. Hannah Jarvis is researching the house, the garden, and specifically the hermit, for a study of hermits and the Romantic imagination. Bernard Nightingale enters with Chloe Coverly; she conceals the professor's identity from Hannah, as Nightingale had given Hannah's last book a poor review. Chloe's brother, Valentine, is gathering data on the population biology of the grouse in the surrounding grounds, using the house's "game books". When Chloe accidentally reveals Bernard's identity, Hannah reacts angrily; but she agrees to share her research material. This enables him to propose the theory that one of the 1809 inhabitants, Ezra Chater, was killed by Lord Byron in a duel. Bernard notes that records of Chater the poet disappeared after 1809, and the only other Chater of record is a botanist.

=== Scene 3 ===
The 19th century. Septimus is tutoring Thomasina, this time in translating Latin. Again their focus diverts, this time to the destruction of the Alexandrian Library, which upsets Thomasina. She mourns the loss of the knowledge stored there, and Septimus responds that all that was lost will eventually turn up again. They are interrupted by Chater, who succeeds in challenging Septimus to a duel, having learned (from Lord Byron off-stage) that Septimus wrote the damning review of his work.

=== Scene 4 ===
The present. Hannah rediscovers Thomasina's primer containing her ideas on iteration and chaos theory; this recalls Septimus' assertion that what was lost is eventually rediscovered. Valentine reacts with interest to the notes, as his own research centres on similar concepts.

=== Scene 5 (Act 2) ===
Bernard gives Hannah, Valentine, and Chloe a preview of his lecture theorising that Lord Byron shot and killed Chater in a duel. When Hannah and Valentine challenge his logic, Bernard launches into a diatribe about the irrelevance of science, then departs for his lecture (and a promotional media appearance) in London. Hannah begins to suspect that the hermit of Sidley Park – who was reportedly obsessed with algebraic computations about the heat death of the universe, the theory suggested in Thomasina's diagram – could have been Septimus.

=== Scene 6 ===
Returning to 1809, we learn that the duel never occurred. Instead, the Chater couple left for the West Indies with Captain Brice. Chater served as the expedition's botanist and his wife Charity was the captain's secret paramour. Lord Byron has also left the country. Septimus has gone rabbit hunting for Thomasina, who favours rabbit pie; he returns to find Lady Croom searching for him. She has found two letters, a love letter addressed to her, and another to Thomasina about rice pudding, both written by Septimus in case he died in a duel. She invites Septimus to an amorous rendezvous.

=== Scene 7 ===
Both 1812 and the present, the actions running concurrently. Some present-day characters are in fancy dress for a party, so that both casts appear similarly attired. After reading a newspaper report on the Byron murder theory, Chloe talks about determinism with Valentine, echoing the discussion between Septimus and Thomasina. Chloe, however, believes that sex is the force that disrupts the universe's ordered plan. Valentine, using his computer to extrapolate Thomasina's ideas, relates them to the later developed concept of entropy. He wonders whether Thomasina or Septimus was the genius behind the theories. Hannah and Valentine mention that Thomasina died in a fire on the eve of her seventeenth birthday.

Meanwhile, Thomasina asks Septimus to teach her to dance, to prepare for her forthcoming 17th birthday party. Lady Croom enters, complaining to Noakes about the noise of his steam engine; Thomasina notes that the machine obeys the laws of entropy (which have not yet been formalized), which describe the universe as winding down. In the present, Bernard arrives and is met by Hannah, who has found a diary entry detailing the facts of Chater's death – this discovery totally discredits Bernard's theory and vindicates Lord Byron's reputation. While Septimus awaits appropriate music for Thomasina's dance lesson, he examines the sketch she made to illustrate the irreversibility of heat; his action mirrors that of Hannah and Valentine, who pondered the same diagram. Bernard is caught in a compromising position with Chloe, and is asked to depart.

Eventually a waltz starts, and Septimus dances with Thomasina, revealing that their relationship is increasingly complicated by hints of romance. Gus (Valentine and Chloe's younger brother, who has been silent for the entire play) hands another of Thomasina's drawings to a surprised Hannah. It depicts Septimus and the tortoise, confirming her suspicion that the hermit, who had a tortoise called Plautus, was Septimus. After Thomasina's tragic death, he apparently became a hermit. Accepting her challenge to the laws of the universe as propounded by Newton, he worked for the rest of his life to apply "honest English algebra" to the question of the universe's future.

== Characters ==
=== Characters of 1809 ===
- Thomasina Coverly: The 13-year-old (later 16-year-old) daughter of Lord and Lady Croom, Thomasina is a precocious genius. She comes to understand chaos theory and the second law of thermodynamics, before either is established in the mathematical and scientific communities. Stoppard "apparently based" the character on Lord Byron's daughter Ada Lovelace (Augusta Ada King, Countess of Lovelace). She was an English mathematician who conceptualised how Charles Babbage's Analytical engine could be used, foreseeing the binary computer.
- Septimus Hodge: Thomasina's tutor, and the academic colleague and friend of Lord Byron (an unseen but important character). While teaching Thomasina, he works on his own research and has affairs with the older women of the house. When Thomasina is older, he falls in love with her; after her death, he becomes the "hermit of Sidley Park", working on her theories until his own death.
- Jellaby: The Crooms' butler. His chief functions are to spread gossip and to deliver letters.
- Ezra Chater: An unsuccessful poetaster staying at Sidley Park. His wife's romantic affairs lead him to challenge Septimus to a duel. Later, it is revealed that he is the amateur botanist "Mr. Chater," who dies of a monkey bite in Martinique, where he has travelled with his wife and Captain Brice.
- Charity Chater: Ezra Chater's wife. Though she, like Byron, never appears onstage, she plays a vital role. She sleeps with Septimus, and her repeatedly cuckolded husband challenges him to a duel. She sleeps with Lord Byron and gets him, Captain Brice, her husband and herself expelled from Sidley Park.
- Richard Noakes: Lady Croom's gardener. Throughout the play, he is working to transform Sidley Park's classical, Arcadia-like landscape into the popular Gothic style – which Lord Croom (a third unseen character) insists on and Lady Croom begrudgingly accepts. He is crucial in exposing Septimus's and Mrs. Chater's affair.
- Lady Croom: Thomasina's mother. She rules the Coverly estate with an iron fist, but flirts with Septimus and other gentlemen throughout the play. A second Lady Croom, the mother of Valentine, Chloe, and Gus in the modern half of the play, never appears on stage.
- Captain Brice: The brother of Lady Croom (of 1809). He is a sea captain who falls in love with Mrs. Chater. He takes her and her husband to the West Indies at the end of the play. After Mr. Chater's death, Captain Brice marries the widowed Charity Chater.
- Augustus Coverly: Thomasina's trouble-making younger brother. He appears in only a few brief scenes. (Gus and Augustus are played by the same actor.)

=== Characters of the present ===
- Hannah Jarvis: The author of a best-seller on Byron's mistress Lady Caroline Lamb. Hannah is researching the elusive hermit of Sidley Park, said to have lived there in the early 19th century. Hannah collaborates (warily) with Bernard and also with Valentine, though she rejects the romantic advances of both.
- Chloe Coverly: The 18-year-old daughter of the modern Lady Croom. While her mind is not as rigorous as Thomasina's, Chloe likes to propose wild ideas. She argues that the Newtonian universe has been destabilized by sex and the problems it causes. She tries to set up Hannah with Bernard, but ends up sleeping with him herself.
- Bernard Nightingale: A don at the modern University of Sussex, England. Bernard comes to Sidley Park hoping to work with Hannah on his theory about Lord Byron staying at the estate. Instead of seeking further evidence, he announces on TV his theory that Lord Byron killed Ezra Chater in a duel. At the end of the play, Hannah proves him wrong, much to his chagrin.
- Valentine Coverly: Chloe's older brother. A graduate student of mathematics, he pores over several old documents and comes to acknowledge Thomasina's genius.
- Gus Coverly: Valentine and Chloe's younger brother, who has been mute since the age of five. Gus helps to pass several important props from past to present, and helps connect key moments in the play. (Gus and Augustus are played by the same actor.)

== Genre ==
Arcadia is, on the surface, somewhere between a tragedy and a comedy. It involves some elements of classical tragedy – "noble" characters and the audience's foreknowledge of Thomasina's death – but the predominant element is comedy, in the way that the characters interact with each other and in their witty, epigrammatic dialogue.

== Themes ==
Arcadia explores the nature of evidence and truth in the context of modern ideas about history, mathematics, and physics. It shows how clues left by the past are interpreted in the present, by both laypeople and scholars. Stoppard said that his initial inspiration came from reading James Gleick's 1987 bestseller, Chaos: Making a New Science, "which is about this new kind of mathematics. That sounds fairly daunting if one's talking about a play. I thought, here is a marvellous metaphor." Besides chaos, the play attends to a wide array of subjects, including thermodynamics, computer algorithms, fractals, population dynamics, determinism (especially in the context of love and death), classics, landscape design, Romanticism vs. Classicism, English literature (particularly poetry), Byron, 18th century periodicals, modern academia, and even South Pacific botany. These are all concrete topics of conversation; their more abstract resonances rise into epistemology, nihilism, and the origins of lust and madness. When asked by Charlie Rose how he first thought to bring these themes together, Stoppard said that his original plan derived simply "from an interest in the way we use terms like 'classical' and 'romantic'. . . that's all I had to start with, abstract as it sounds."

Arcadia's themes are presented in a series of dichotomies. Most prominent is chaos versus order. The play's characters and action embody this, moving from a settled social order, in which relationships arise, towards the final scene, where the social order – and even the separation of the two eras – dissolve in the party's chaos, relationships collapse, and the characters die or disperse. Yet within that chaos, order can still be found. As Valentine declares: "In an ocean of ashes, islands of order. Patterns making themselves out of nothing." Although the play's world grows increasingly chaotic – with overlapping time periods, increasingly complex ideas, and ever greater variations in social norms and assumptions – connections and order can still be discerned. The characters attempt to find and articulate the order they perceive in their world, even as it is continually overturned.

The centre-stage table that collects props from both time periods throughout the play is a vivid metaphor of the chaos/order dichotomy. As Paul Edwards, professor of English and History of Art at Bath Spa University, suggests:

At the end of the play, the table has accumulated a variety of objects that, if one saw them without having seen the play, would seem completely random and disordered. Entropy is high. But if one has seen the play, one has full information about the objects and the hidden 'order' of their arrangement, brought about by the performance itself. Entropy is low; this can be proved by reflecting that tomorrow night's performance of the play will finish with the table in a virtually identical 'disorder' – which therefore cannot really be disorder at all.

A closely related theme in Arcadia is the opposition of Classicism and Romanticism. This appears most clearly in the running arguments between Noakes and Lady Croom about proposed changes to the garden. Their disagreements are about changing from the tidy order of Classic style to the rugged naturalism and Gothic mystery of the Romantic. A parallel dichotomy is expressed by Septimus and Thomasina: he instructs her in the Newtonian vision of the universe, while she keeps posing questions and proposing theories that undercut it. Hannah's search for the hermit of Sidley Park also touches on this theme. "The whole Romantic sham!" she passionately exclaims to Bernard. "It's what happened to the Enlightenment, isn't it? A century of intellectual rigour turned in on itself. A mind in chaos suspected of genius ... The decline from thinking to feeling."

Another major theme is entropy and the irreversibility of time. Thomasina examines this scientifically, remarking that while Newtonian equations work both backwards and forwards, things in reality – like her rice pudding – cannot be "unstirred." Heat, too, she notes, flows in only one direction (the second law of thermodynamics). This is embodied by the characters, who burn bridges in relationships, burn candles, and burn letters – and in the end, Thomasina herself (like a short-lived candle) burns to death.

Thomasina's insights into thermodynamics and heat transfer, and the idea that the universe is cooling, echo the poem "Darkness" by her "real life" contemporary, Lord Byron. Written in 1816 – the "Year Without a Summer", caused by atmospheric ash from the volcano Mount Tambora erupting in the Dutch East Indies – "Darkness" depicts a world grown dark and cold because the sun has been extinguished.

The play's end brings all these dichotomous themes together, showing that while things may appear to contradict – Romanticism and Classicism, intuition and logic, thought and feeling – they can exist, paradoxically, in the same time and space. Order is found amid the chaos.

== Style ==
Jim Hunter writes that Arcadia is a relatively realistic play, compared with Stoppard's other works, though the realism is "much enhanced and teased about by the alternation of two eras". The setting and characters are true-to-life, without being archetypal. It is comprehensible: the plot is both logical and probable, following events in a linear fashion. Arcadia's major deviation from realism, of course, is in having two plotlines that are linear and parallel. Thus we see Thomasina deriving her mathematical equations to describe the forms of nature; we later see Val, with his computer, plotting them to produce the image of a leaf.

== Language ==
The language of Arcadia switches between the colloquialisms of early 19th-century England and those of modern England. Stoppard's language reflects his periods, historical and modern, and he uses speech patterns and lexicons in keeping with his characters.

But his is a stylised dialogue, conveying the "look and feel" of the past as perceived by the modern audience. Still, it has sufficient latitude in register to make plain the relationships between the characters. For example, Septimus, after failing to deflect a question from Thomasina with a joke, bluntly explains to his pupil the nature of "carnal embrace" – but this bluntness is far removed from that with which he dismisses Chater's self-deceiving defence of his wife's reputation (which, Septimus says, "could not be adequately defended with a platoon of musketry"). With Lady Croom, in responding to his employer's description of Mrs. Chater as a "harlot", Septimus delicately admits that "her passion is not as fixed" as one might wish.

In the modern sequences, the dialogue is more realistic. But Bernard consciously assumes some stylisation of language: he rehearses his public lecture in heightened, flamboyant rhetoric; and he unleashes a polemic against Valentine's scientific thought (describing the concept as no more than "performance art"), not from spite but for "recreation".

The play's scientific concepts are set forth primarily in the historical scenes, where Thomasina delivers her precocious (or even anachronistic) references to entropy, the deterministic universe and iterated equations in improvised, colloquial terms. In the modern era, Valentine explains the significance of Thomasina's rediscovered notebook with careful detail, reflecting Stoppard's research into his play's scientific materials.

Consciously echoed phrases, across the time frames, help to unify the play. For example, Chloe asks Valentine if "the future is all programmed like a computer", and whether she is the first to think that theory discredited "because of sex". Thomasina has been there before: "If you could stop every atom in its position and direction ... you could write the formula for all the future," she tells Septimus, then adds, "Am I the first person to have thought of this?" The difference is significant: Chloe's intuitive version allows for the effects of chaos, illustrating Stoppard's theme of the interdependence of science and art, and between professional and amateur thinking.

== Title ==
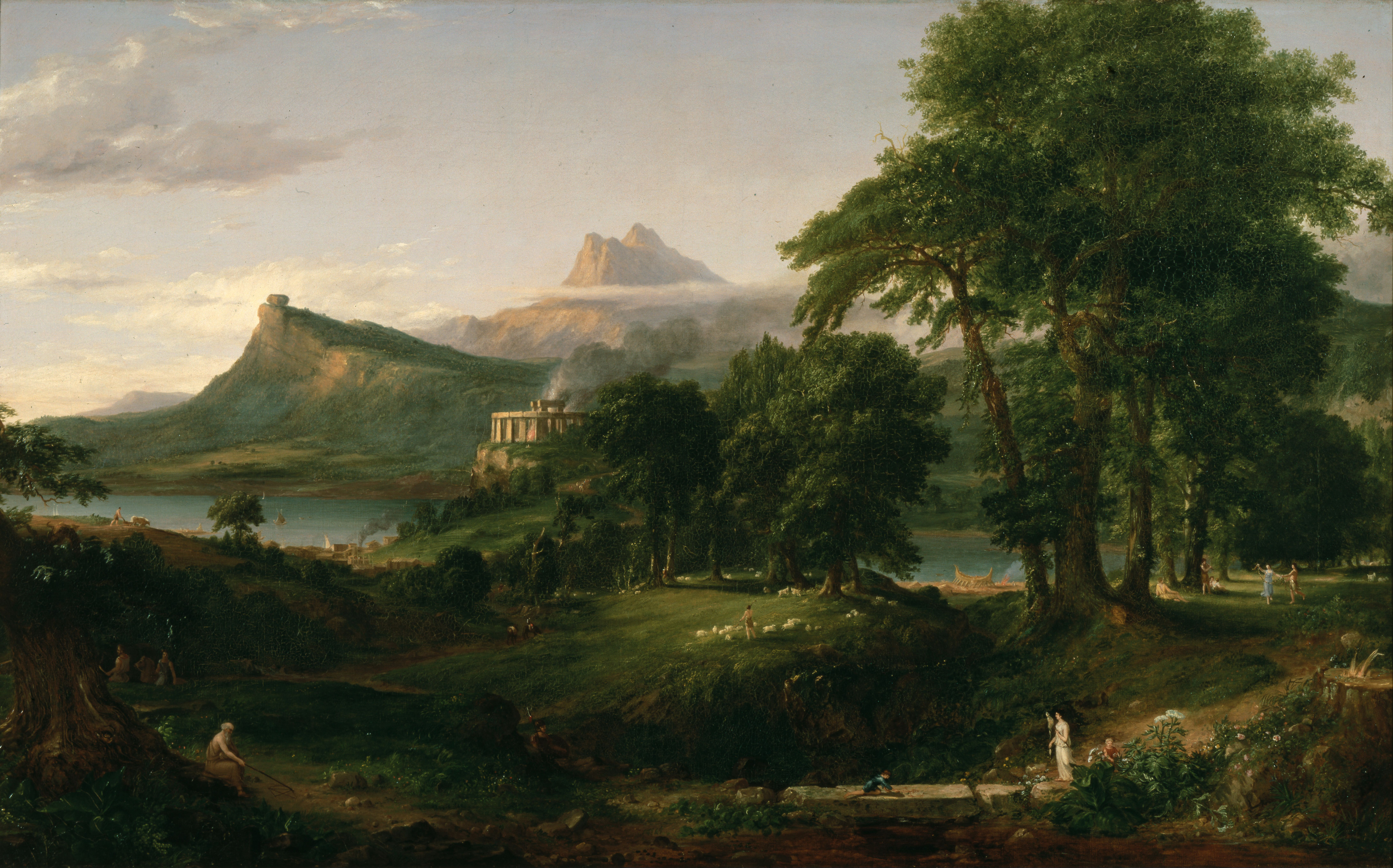
The title Arcadia alludes to a pastoral ideal.

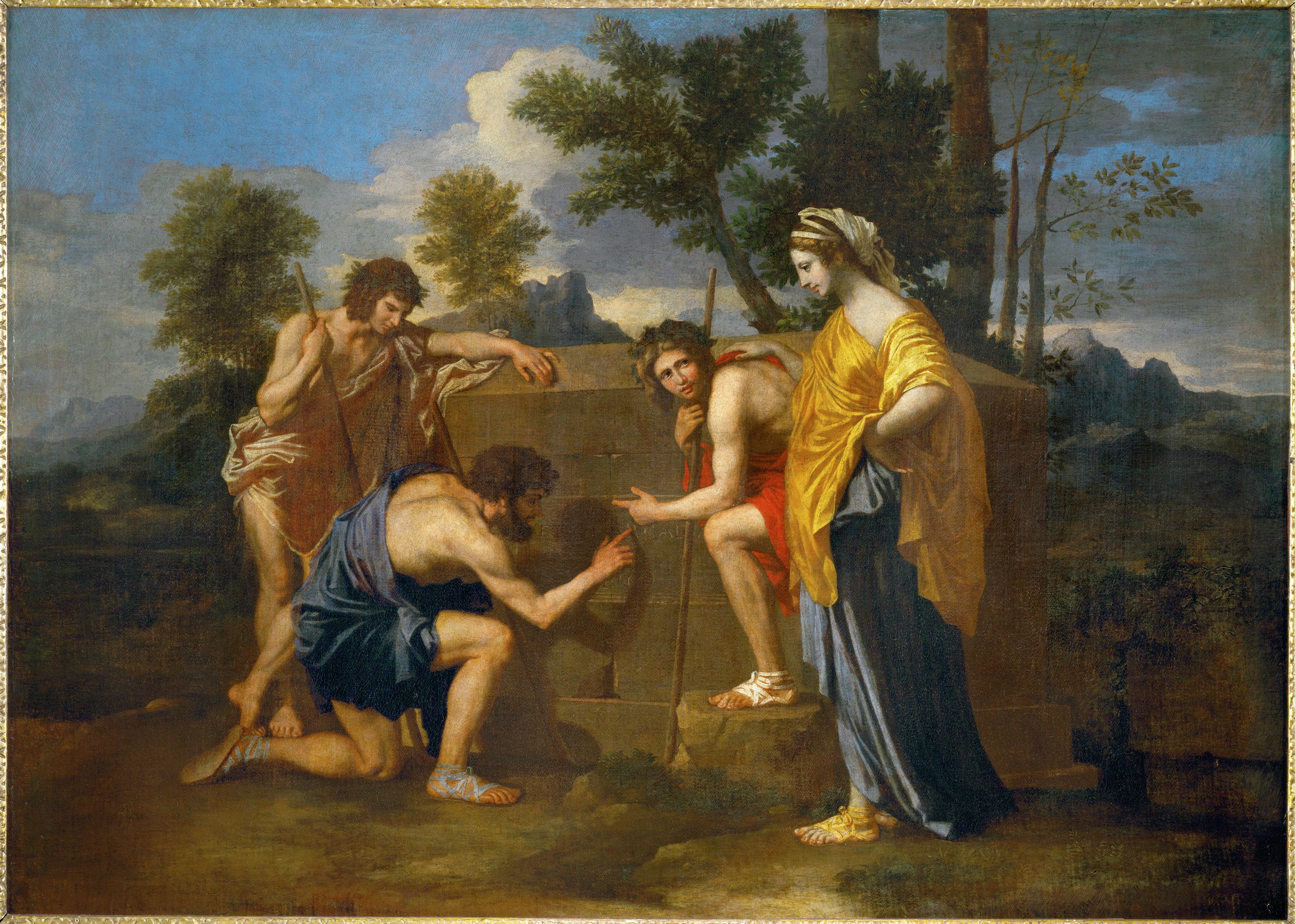
Et in Arcadia ego is most known as the title of this painting by Nicolas Poussin, also known as Les bergers d'Arcadie ('The Arcadian Shepherds')

The play's title is abbreviated from its initial version: Et in Arcadia ego. Arcadia refers to the pastoral ideal; the phrase literally translates, 'and in Arcadia [there] I am'. The tradition of placing a tomb in a pastoral idyll can be traced to Virgil's Eclogues, while the phrase first appears in Guercino's painting dated to c. 1618–1622. Both the image and the motto are commonly considered a memento mori, with the phrase being spoken by Death: "I, too, am in Arcadia". But the enigmatic phrase remains a subject of much academic discussion.

Lady Croom, enthusing about paintings of pretty landscapes, translates the phrase as "Here I am in Arcadia!" Thomasina drily comments, "Yes Mama, if you would have it so". Septimus notices; later, suspecting his pupil will appreciate the motto's true meaning, he offers the translation "Even in Arcadia, there am I". He is right – "Oh, phooey to Death!" she exclaims. Although these brief exchanges are the only direct references in the play to its title, they presage the two main characters' fates: Thomasina's early death, and Septimus's voluntary exile from life. Stoppard originally wanted to make this connection more explicit by using Et in Arcadia Ego for the title, but "box office sense prevailed".

In a more obvious sense, the title also invokes the ideal of nature as an ordered paradise, while the estate's landscape steadily evolves into a more irregular form. This provides a recurring image of the different ways in which "true nature" can be understood, and a homely parallel to Thomasina's theoretical description of the natural world's structure and entropic decline using mathematics.

== Contextual information ==
In Arcadia, Stoppard presents his audience with several highly complex but fundamental mathematical and scientific concepts. He also uses these theories and ideas to illuminate relationships among his characters, adding to their poignancy.

One of the play's main thematic concepts is chaos theory. Paul Edwards, in his essay "Science in Hapgood and Arcadia", notes that "chaos mathematics is about the recovery of information from apparently chaotic and random systems where entropy is high. [...] It is 'asymmetric' (unlike the equations of classical physics), yet it finds regularities that prove to be the regularities of nature itself. Strikingly, this mathematics can generate patterns of amazing complexity, but it also has the power to generate seemingly natural or organic shapes that defeat Newtonian geometry. The promise, then, (however questionable it is in reality) is that information, and by extension, nature itself, can overcome the tendency to increase in entropy". John Fleming, in his book Stoppard's Theatre: Finding Order amid Chaos, makes a similar observation. "Deterministic chaos", he writes, "deals with systems of unpredictable determinism. ... [T]he uncertainty does not result in pure randomness, but rather in complex patterns. Traditionally, scientists expected dynamic systems to settle into stable, predictable behavior." But as systems respond to variations in input, they become more random or chaotic. "Surprisingly, within these random states, windows of order reappear. [...] There is order in chaos – an unpredictable order, but a determined order nonetheless, and not merely random behavior."

Closely related scientific and mathematical concepts in Arcadia are the second law of thermodynamics and entropy. Fleming describes these two principles. "Entropy is the measure of the randomness or disorder of a system. The law of increase of entropy states that as a whole, the universe is evolving from order to disorder. This relates to the second law of thermodynamics, which states that heat spontaneously flows in only one direction, from hotter to colder. Since these equations, unlike Newton's laws of motion, do not go backward and forward, there is an 'arrow of time' that points toward the eventual 'heat death' of the universe."

In Arcadia, Stoppard uses all these concepts to reveal that "there is an underlying order to seemingly random events." The characters discuss these topics, while their interactions reflect them. Often these discussions themselves create order and connections beneath the appearance of disunity. For example, both Thomasina's theories on heat and Valentine's search for a "signal" in the "noise" of the local grouse population refer to the physicist Joseph Fourier and his development of the Fourier transform, which he first used to analyze the physics of heat transfer but has since found wide application. Though the characters would seem to have little in common, their work in fact relates to the same topic.

Some ideas in the play recall Goethe's novella Elective Affinities: Stoppard's characters "Thomasina" and "Septimus" have parallels in Goethe's "Ottilie" and "Eduard", and the historical section of Stoppard's play is set in 1809, the year of Goethe's novella. Among other parallels, the older work takes the theory of affinity between chemical elements as a metaphor for ineluctable, inevitable "human chemistry" in the same way as Stoppard makes use of the force of determinism acting on his characters. A feature of both works is the preoccupation with remodelling country house landscapes; Goethe's young character "Ottilie" (the counterpart to Thomasina) dies as an indirect result of this.

== Productions ==
Poster, by James McMullan, for the Lincoln Center 1995 production

Arcadia first opened at the Royal National Theatre in London on 13 April 1993, in a production directed by Trevor Nunn with Rufus Sewell as Septimus Hodge, Felicity Kendal as Hannah Jarvis, Bill Nighy as Bernard Nightingale, Emma Fielding as Thomasina Coverly, Allan Mitchell as Jellaby, Derek Hutchinson as Ezra Chater, Sidney Livingstone as Richard Noakes, Harriet Walter as Lady Croom, Graham Sinclair as Captain Brice, Harriet Harrison as Chloe Coverly, Timothy Matthews as Augustus and Gus Coverly and Samuel West as Valentine Coverly. It won the 1993 Olivier and Evening Standard Awards for Best Play.

The first New York production opened in March 1995, at the Vivian Beaumont Theater. It was again directed by Trevor Nunn, but with an entirely new cast. It starred Billy Crudup as Septimus, Blair Brown as Hannah, Victor Garber as Bernard, Robert Sean Leonard as Valentine and Jennifer Dundas as Thomasina. This production was the Broadway debut of Paul Giamatti, who played Ezra Chater. The other actors were Lisa Banes (Lady Croom), Richard Clarke (Jellaby), John Griffin (Gus/Augustus), Peter Maloney (Noakes), David Manis (Captain Brice, RN) and Haviland Morris (Chloe). This production won the New York Drama Critics' Circle Award, and was nominated for the 1995 Tony Award for Best Play, losing to Terrence McNally's Love! Valour! Compassion!.

In December 1996, the first major US regional production was mounted at the Arena Stage in Washington, D.C.

The French premiere took place on 13 January 1998 at the Théâtre du Vieux-Colombier by the company of the Comédie-Française, directed by Philippe Adrien, with Jean-Pierre Michaël as Septimus, Françoise Gillard as Thomasina, Claude Mathieu as Anna (Hannah), Jean-Baptiste Malartre as Bernard, and Denis Podalydès as Valentin; it was translated by Jean-Marie Besset.

On 27 May 2009, a London production, directed by David Leveaux, opened at the Duke of York's Theatre starring Dan Stevens (Septimus Hodge), Samantha Bond (Hannah Jarvis), Jessie Cave (Thomasina Coverly), Nancy Carroll (Lady Croom), Trevor Cooper (Richard Noakes), Sam Cox (Jellaby), Lucy Griffiths (Chloë Coverly), Tom Hodgkins (Captain Brice), Hugh Mitchell (Augustus/Gus Coverly), Neil Pearson (Bernard Nightingale), George Potts (Ezra Chater) and Ed Stoppard (Valentine Coverly). The production recouped its costs and closed on 12 September 2009.

Arcadia returned to Broadway, at the Ethel Barrymore Theatre, on 17 March 2011, again directed by David Leveaux. The cast included Margaret Colin (Lady Croom), Billy Crudup (Septimus in the original Broadway version, now playing Bernard Nightingale), Raúl Esparza (Valentine Coverly), Glenn Fleshler (Captain Brice), Grace Gummer (Chloë Coverly), Edward James Hyland (Jellaby), Byron Jennings (Richard Noakes), Bel Powley (Thomasina Coverly), Tom Riley (Septimus Hodge), Noah Robbins (Gus Coverly/Augustus Coverly), David Turner (Ezra Chater), and Lia Williams (Hannah Jarvis). The production was nominated for the Tony Award for Best Revival of a Play.

Arcadia returned to London, to the Old Vic Theatre. It was announced on 29th October 2025 to run from 19th January to 21st March 2026. Directed by Carrie Cracknell, it is the first major production following Stoppard’s death in November 2025 and is the first to interpret the set differently as this production was set in the round with a double revolve. The cast included Gabriel Akuwudike (Richard Noakes), Fiona Button (Lady Croom), Angus Cooper (Valentine Coverly), Seamus Dillane (Septimus Hodge), Leila Farzad (Hannah Jarvis), Tim Frances (Jellaby), Holly Godliman (Chloë Coverly), Isis Hainsworth (Thomasina Coverly), William Lawlor (Gus/Augustus Coverly), Colin Mace (Captain Brice), Prasanna Puwanarajah (Bernard Nightingale) and Matthew Steer (Ezra Chater). They were joined by understudies David Buttle (Bernard Nightingale/Ezra Chater/Capt. Brice/Jellaby/Richard Noakes), Keziah Hayes (Thomasina/Chloë Coverly), George Lorimer (Septimus Hodge/Valentine/Gus/Augustus Coverly) and Lizzie Schenk (Hannah Jarvis/Lady Croom). The production was nominated for the Laurence Olivier Award for Best Revival and Laurence Olivier Award for Best Actress in a Supporting Role.

This production was then transferred to the West End, to the Tom Stoppard Theatre (previously the Duke of York’s) from 20 June on a limited 12 week run. The cast included Nikki Amuka-Bird (Hannah Jarvis), Aaron Anthony (Richard Noakes), David Buttle (Captain Brice), Oliver Chris (Bernard Nightingale), Angus Cooper (Valentine Coverly), Seamus Dillane (Septimus Hodge), Matthew Doswell (Gus Coverly/Augustus Coverly), Tim Frances (Jellaby), Holly Godliman (Chloe Coverly), Isis Hainsworth (Thomasina Coverly), Matthew Steer (Ezra Chater), Yolanda Kettle (Lady Croom) and understudies; Alex Britt, Peta Cornish, Keziah Hayes and Eddie Mann.

== Reception ==
The Times, reviewing the first production in 1993, praised it as a "perfect marriage of ideas and high comedy". But for some, the ideas overwhelmed the comedy: "[T]oo clever by about two-and-three-quarters," noted critic Jack Tinker. "One comes away instructed with more than one can usefully wish to know." After an eight-month run at the National, the play's transfer to the West End gave an opportunity for re-appraisal. Daily Telegraph critic Charles Spencer commented: "I have never left a play more convinced that I had just witnessed a masterpiece".

Vincent Canby of The New York Times described the play as "Tom Stoppard's richest, most ravishing comedy to date, a play of wit, intellect, language, brio and, new for him, emotion". But other New York reviews were mixed or unfavourable, complaining of the anachronisms and lack of realism. The production left John Simon of New York Magazine with the view that "Stoppard overdoes it…Arcadia makes better reading than seeing". The book review website The Pequod rated the play a 10.0 (out of 10.0), saying "Arcadia combines an astonishing range of disparate elements — romance, humor, tragedy, sorrow, scientific history, and even gardening — into an entirely unique work of art."

The 2009 London revival prompted more critics to laud the play as "Stoppard's finest work". Michael Billington wrote in The Guardian that the play "gets richer with each viewing. ... [T]here is poetry and passion behind the mathematics and metaphysics." Johann Hari of The Independent speculated that Arcadia would be recognised "as the greatest play of its time".

The 2011 Broadway staging met with a mixed reception. Ben Brantley of The New York Times called the production "a half-terrific revival of Mr. Stoppard's entirely terrific Arcadia", noting that "several central roles are slightly miscast", and "some of the performances from the Anglo-American cast are pitched to the point of incoherence." Similar concerns were raised by critics from the New York magazine, The Hollywood Reporter, The Wall Street Journal, New York Daily News, Time Out New York and Bloomberg News.

=== Inspiration for chemotherapy innovation ===
In a letter to The Times published on 2 December 2025 shortly after Stoppard's death, surgeon Michael Baum related how the play inspired his research into chemotherapy for breast cancer, which led to the development of tamoxifen and significant reductions in mortality rates:

Thomasina asks her tutor, Septimus: "If there is an equation for a curve like a bell, there must be an equation for one like a bluebell, and if a bluebell, why not a rose?" With that Stoppard explains chaos theory, which better explains the behaviour of breast cancer. At the point of diagnosis, the cancer must have already scattered cancer cells into the circulation that nest latent in distant organs. The consequence of that hypothesis was the birth of "adjuvant systemic chemotherapy", and rapidly we saw a striking fall of the curve that illustrated patients' survival. Stoppard never learnt how many lives he saved by writing Arcadia.

== Awards and nominations ==
Awards

- 1993 Laurence Olivier Award for Best New Play

Nominations

- 1995 Drama Desk Award for Outstanding Play
- 1995 Tony Award for Best Play
- 2006 Arcadia was voted onto the shortlist for the Royal Institution award for "the best science book ever written". The winner, announced on 19 October 2006, was The Periodic Table by Primo Levi.
- 2011 Tony Award for Best Revival of a Play
- 2026 Laurence Olivier Award for Best Revival
- 2026 Laurence Olivier Award for Best Actress in a Supporting Role
