= Our Zoo =

- Genre: Period drama
- Created by: Matt Charman
- Written by: Matt Charman; George Kay
- Directed by: Andy De Emmony; Robert McKillop; Saul Metzstein
- Starring: Lee Ingleby; Liz White; Ralf Little; Stephen Campbell Moore; Sophia Myles; Amelia Clarkson; Honor Kneafsey; Peter Wight; Anne Reid
- Composer: Nick Green
- Country of origin: United Kingdom
- Original language: English
- No. of series: 1
- No. of episodes: 6

Production
- Executive producers: Luke Alkin; Kenton Allen; Matthew Justice; Adam Kemp
- Producer: Marcus Wilson
- Running time: 60 minutes
- Production company: Big Talk Productions

Original release
- Network: BBC One; BBC One HD
- Release: 3 September – 8 October 2014

Our Zoo is a British period drama television series from BBC One, first broadcast on 3 September 2014.

The six-part series, created by Matt Charman, is about George Mottershead, his dreams of creating a cage-free zoo, his family and how their lives changed when they embarked on the creation of Chester Zoo.

== Cast ==
- Lee Ingleby as George Mottershead
- Liz White as Lizzie Mottershead
- Anne Reid as Lucy Mottershead
- Peter Wight as Albert Mottershead
- Ralf Little as Billy Atkinson
- Sophia Myles as Lady Katherine Longmore
- Stephen Campbell Moore as Reverend Aaron Webb
- Amelia Clarkson as Muriel Mottershead
- Honor Kneafsey as June Mottershead

== Production ==
Our Zoo was commissioned by Danny Cohen and Ben Stephenson for BBC One. The series was based on an idea introduced to Big Talk Productions by Aenon, the production company headed by Adam Kemp. Filming took place in Liverpool, as well as at Walton Hall in Warrington, at Abney Hall in Cheadle and at the Swan with Two Necks in Stockport. When BBC said there would be no second series of Our Zoo, many fans were left surprised by the decision. On 10 December 2014 the Chester Chronicle created an online petition in the hopes of renewing the show for another series, and by the next day more than 1000 fans had signed it. In spite of these efforts, however, the BBC reiterated that they would not be producing a second series.

== Episode list ==
No.	Title	Directed by	Written by	Original release date	UK viewers (millions)
1	"The Idea"	Andy De Emmony	Matt Charman	3 September 2014	5.17
George Mottershead lives in the flat above his father Albert's grocery shop with his wife Lizzie and their daughters Muriel and June. He suffers from post-traumatic stress disorder following his time in the army during World War I, but his mother Lucy is frustrated that George still lives with them and wants him and his family to move out. The family become concerned for George's mental state when he visits the local dockyard's quarantine office and purchases a squirrel monkey and an eclectus parrot which were about to be euthanised. George promises to sell the animals to a circus, but ends up buying an old Bactrian camel which the circus' ringmaster planned to slaughter. The three animals are kept in the family's small backyard, and while the neighbours are willing to pay to see them, the grocery shop gets fewer customers. Driving through Upton-by-Chester on his way to an army reunion, George sees the run-down Oakfield Manor, which is up for auction. Inspired by a conversation about wildlife with Lady Katherine Longmore, he plans to convert the Oakfield estate into a zoo where animals would not be behind bars. While the family are initially sceptical and Lucy is completely against the idea, George gets a £3,000 loan from the bank. At the auction, the Mottersheads win Oakfield Manor for £3,500, but Albert has to sell his shop and the family home for the additional £500. The Mottersheads move into the Manor, and agree to keep their plans a secret from the people of Upton for the first few months. However, the squirrel monkey (which June names "Mortimer") breaks out of his cage and wanders into a shop, frightening the shopkeeper and arousing suspicion among the community.
2	"Moving On"	Andy De Emmony	Matt Charman	10 September 2014	5.31
The Mottershead family struggle to adjust to their new life, while George continues to develop the zoo (which he names "Chester Zoo") and acquires more animals, including two goats, a pelican and several small birds for an aviary. He visits Matlock, Derbyshire, where the owner of a pleasure garden offers to sell him two Asian black bears, but when George tells the family about the offer, Lizzie, Muriel and Lucy refuse to let him bring them to the Manor. Despite this, George still returns to Matlock to collect the bears, accompanied by Lizzie's brother Billy Atkinson. While he is away, Lizzie visits Chester Council and tries to file for planning permission to build the zoo, while also making changes to George's plans for the zoo's layout. In Upton, the community start to gossip about the Mottersheads due to their secretive behaviour, and local reverend Aaron Webb suspects illegal activity. When June starts school, Webb convinces her to tell him about her family, and she goes on a tangent about the various animals they own, including the camel and the bears. Webb then goes to the Chester Council and encourages councilman Ronald Tipping to have the zoo shut down before it is completed.
3	"The Village Rivals"	Andy De Emmony	George Kay	17 September 2014	5.21
As word spreads about the zoo, the Mottershead family are met with harsh backlash from the people of Upton, who are strongly opposed to the idea and start a campaign to prevent the zoo from opening. However, George is undeterred by the criticisms and appears at a town meeting to promote the zoo, but the villagers are unconvinced and the Mottersheads gain a bad reputation in the village, leading to June being bullied at school. Despite this, George writes a letter to Chester Council detailing their plans and starts digging a trench to surround the bear enclosure, while Albert and Muriel complete an aviary built around an old gazebo and transfer all the small birds into it. Local shopkeeper Mrs Radler visits Katherine Longmore and tries to convince her to side with Upton in the debate, but Katherine disregards her and continues to show support for the Mottersheads. At Chester Council, Ronald Tipping receives George's letter, but decides not to read it. Newspaper journalist Tim Gascoigne visits Oakfield Manor to interview the Mottersheads about the zoo, but he takes their words out of context and publishes a negative article slandering their venture. Billy drives into Upton with a flock of Humboldt penguins he acquired for the zoo, but his van breaks down in the middle of town, so he and George lead the penguins to Oakfield on foot. The villagers are entertained by this and follow them, and when they arrive Albert strikes a water pipe to flood the trench, converting it into a pool for the penguins. That night, the Mottersheads celebrate the newly-gained support and George appoints Muriel as deputy zookeeper. Outside, while no one notices, one of the black bears becomes agitated and frees itself from their enclosure.
4	"The Fund Of Chester Zoo"	Robert McKillop	Matt Charman	24 September 2014	4.81
Discovering that one of the bears has escaped, George heads out to look for it. He finds the bear in a nearby forest, but the arrival of Billy's van scares it and it scratches George's arm. While he and Billy successfully get the bear back to Oakfield, George realises the zoo needs more money to make the enclosures more secure, and the next day he requests a £300 loan from the bank, but is refused. At the bank, George meets aristocrat Lady Goodwin, who takes a liking to Mortimer the squirrel monkey. She visits Oakfield to see Mortimer again, and George suggests she pay the Mottersheads a small amount of money per month to "adopt" the monkey. Meanwhile, Mrs Radler and Reverend Webb organise a petition to get the zoo closed. George's wounded arm becomes infected, leaving him bedridden for several days. Frankie, a receptionist from Chester Council, gives the Mottersheads a carpet python which had been abandoned outside the council building. Lizzie finds out that Katherine Longmore has opened an account at the local shop to give the Mottersheads financial support, which gives George the idea to organise a fundraising benefit. Katherine agrees for the benefit to be hosted in her mansion, and Lady Goodwin invites several of her aristocratic friends. At the event, the Mottersheads display several of their animals and hold an auction of charitable adoptions. The python escapes from its basket and goes missing, so Billy and Frankie try to catch it without the guests finding out. The benefit is a success, with the Mottersheads raising £320 in donations, while June and Albert catch the python. However, Reverend Webb tells George that Chester Council has refused planning permission for the Mottersheads to build the zoo.
5	"In The Middle Of A Local War"	Robert McKillop	Matt Charman	1 October 2014	5.56
The Mottersheads are left devastated by the news that planning permission for the zoo has been denied. To keep up with their debts, George and Lizzie sell one of the black bears to Belle Vue Zoo. Lucy notices the other bear acting strangely and realises it is pregnant. A land agent offers to buy Oakfield Manor for the same amount the Mottersheads bought it for, but George turns him away. At Chester Council, Frankie takes a copy of the Upton petition from Ronald Tipping's desk and has Billy take it to George. Reading through the reasons listed in the petition, George learns that Mrs Radler manipulated the villagers into making up false reasons for the zoo to be closed. He goes to Chester Council and confronts Tipping about the corruption, and while Tipping confidently disregards him, Frankie explains that the Mottersheads can legally appeal against the council's decision. George contacts the Ministry of Health to request an appeal, but is told there is a long waiting list and it could take several months for their appeal to be read. Katherine reveals that her nephew, Aldous Whittlington-Smith, works closely with health minister Sir Arthur Addison, and she and George travel to London to see Sir Arthur and tell him about their appeal. Reverend Webb tries to convince Lizzie to leave Oakfield and offers to move her family into a nearby cottage, but she mentions the land agent's offer and explains it wouldn't be enough to cover the family's debts. When the agent returns with a higher offer, Lizzie realises Webb has been sending him. She confronts Webb, whose late wife's family originally owned Oakfield, but he defends himself by saying George's ambitions will lead the family into poverty. In London, George and Katherine talk to Arthur at an opera, and discuss their plans for the zoo and their appeal against Chester Council. While Arthur is interested, he does not guarantee the appeal will be successful. When George returns to Upton, he finds the family gathered around the bear, which has given birth to two cubs. The family later receive a letter from Arthur, approving a public hearing to decide the zoo's planning application. Tipping conspires with Webb to make George look bad at the hearing.
6	"The Final Decision"	Saul Metzstein	Matt Charman	8 October 2014	5.66
Albert discovers that the zoo's aviary has been vandalised in the night, and all its birds have flown away. George and Lizzie have a meeting with lawyer Neville Kelly, hoping for him to represent the Mottersheads in the upcoming hearing. Kelly during that meeting, if the telephone rang, picks up the receiver and puts it back at once to stop the ringing, instead of having a secretary to answer the telephone while Kelly is busy; that does not bode well to George for his chances of later contacting Kelly by telephone. However, Kelly's demeanour annoys George so much that he decides to represent the family himself. As the hearing draws closer, George spends many hours researching legal information and becomes more hostile and aggressive towards the rest of the family. June invites her school friend Barbara around to Oakfield and they play hide and seek, but when George catches Barbara in his study he is outraged and sends her home. Katherine agrees to be a character reference for the Mottersheads at the hearing. Realising George's short temper may work against them, Lizzie goes back to Kelly and asks him to be their lawyer, and he accepts. When George learns of this on the day of the hearing, he leaves and sits outside while the hearing takes place. While Tipping, Reverend Webb and Mrs Radler give strong evidence against the Mottersheads, Katherine praises the family and Kelly exposes the lies in Upton's petition. Frankie tells Billy that Tipping did not read George's letter about the zoo, and urges him to tell George. Muriel convinces George to be present at the hearing, and when he returns Billy tells him about the unread letter. Due to the even divide between oppositions, health minister Joseph Keene concludes that the fate of the appeal will be decided after an inspection of the zoo itself. Once the hearing ends, Tipping dismisses Frankie for her betrayal. The next day, Keene visits Oakfield Manor and inspects each animal enclosure, but despite George's urging he does not make a decision that day. Barbara finds two lovebirds from the vandalised aviary in her garden and returns them to Oakfield. A few days after the inspection, the Mottersheads receive a letter from the Ministry of Health approving for Chester Zoo to be opened. The family continue development ahead of their opening, and despite promising in the hearing that the zoo would have no dangerous animals, George acquires a lion.
