= Amelia Clarkson =

English actress (born 1997)

- Born: Amelia Jayne Clarkson; 12 February 1997 (age 29)
- Years active: 2009–present

Amelia Jayne Clarkson (born 12 February 1997) is an English actress. She began her career as a child actress in the films Jane Eyre (2011) and All Stars (2013). On television, she is known for her roles in the ITV series Poldark (2016–2019), the Netflix series The Last Kingdom (2018–2022), and the BBC Three series Red Rose (2022).

== Early life ==
Clarkson is from Hounslow, West London. She attended Sylvia Young Theatre School.

== Career ==
Clarkson made her television debut in two 2009 episodes of the Doctor Who spinoff The Sarah Jane Adventures as Elizabeth Marchwood in "The Eternity Trap". This was followed by her feature film debut with a small role in Mr Nice. Clarkson portrayed a young version of the titular Jane Eyre (played by Mia Wasikowska as an adult) in the 2011 film adaptation of Charlotte Brontë's novel.

In 2013, Clarkson starred in the dance film All Stars as Rebecca. The following year, she played Kelly Grimes in the ABC Cold War-set miniseries The Assets and Muriel Mottershead in the BBC One biographical drama Our Zoo. She was cast in an Amazon Prime pilot titled Casanova with Diego Luna.

Clarkson joined the recurring cast of the ITV period drama Poldark for its second series as Rosina Hoblyn (later Carne), a role she would reprise in the fourth and fifth series. She also had a recurring role as Sophie in the History series Knightfall and appeared in the film Intrigo: Dear Agnes. Clarkson was then cast in series 3 of the Netflix medieval drama The Last Kingdom as Lady Aelflaed. Initially a recurring character, she was promoted to the main cast for The Last Kingdom's final two series, the latter of which was released in 2022.

Later in 2022, Clarkson starred as Wren Davis opposite Isis Hainsworth in the BBC One teen horror series Red Rose, which had an international release on Netflix the following year. Clarkson has an upcoming role in the vampire film Blood & Ink with Malcolm McDowell and Derek Jacobi.

== Filmography ==
=== Film ===
| Year | Title | Role | Notes |
|---|---|---|---|
| 2010 | Mr Nice | Myfawny Marks | |
| 2011 | Jane Eyre | Young Jane | |
| 2013 | All Stars | Rebecca | |
| 2016 | Rags | Lena | Short film |
| 2016 | Tooth Fairy | Madeleine | Short film |
| 2018 | Stomping Grounds | Amy | Short film |
| 2019 | Intrigo: Dear Agnes | Louise | |
| TBA | Blood & Ink | | |
| TBA | EVOL | Dolly | |

=== Television ===
| Year | Title | Role | Notes |
|---|---|---|---|
| 2009 | The Sarah Jane Adventures | Elizabeth Marchwood | 2-episode arc: "The Eternity Trap" |
| 2011 | Doctors | Lauren Jarvis | Episode: "Once Upon a Time" |
| 2014 | The Assets | Kelly Grimes | Miniseries, 4 episodes |
| 2014 | Our Zoo | Muriel Mottershead | Miniseries, 6 episodes |
| 2015 | Casanova | Manon Balletti | Pilot |
| 2016 | Endeavour | Ayesha | Episode: "Arcadia" |
| 2016–2019 | Poldark | Rosina Hoblyn / Rosina Carne | Recurring role (series 2–5), 15 episodes |
| 2017–2018 | Knightfall | Sophie | Recurring role (season 1), 6 episodes |
| 2018–2022 | The Last Kingdom | Lady Aelflaed | Recurring role (series 3); Main role (series 4–5), 17 episodes |
| 2022 | Red Rose | Wren Davis | Main role, 8 episodes |
| 2023 | Death in Paradise | Mariana Stableforth | 1 episode |
| 2025 | Talamasca: The Secret Order | Keves | 3 episodes |
