= Shelter (Coben novel) =

2011 young adult novel by Harlan Coben

- First edition (US)
- Author: Harlan Coben
- Language: English
- Series: Mickey Bolitar series
- Genre: Young adult crime, thriller
- Published: September 15, 2011 Orion (UK); Putnam (US)
- Publication place: United States
- Media type: Print (hardback, paperback)
- Pages: 304
- ISBN: 978-1-4091-2445-0
- OCLC: 751790408
- Followed by: Seconds Away (2012)

Shelter is the first novel of the "Mickey Bolitar" series by American crime writer Harlan Coben. It is his first young adult novel. It features the teenage nephew of Coben's popular protagonist Myron Bolitar. The novel was first published on September 15, 2011, by Orion Books in the UK and Puffin Books in the US.

== Reception ==
Geoff Adams, for the Otago Daily Times, found that the novel provided "mystery, suspense and thrills enough" and concluded that "you will enjoy reading it to find out more. And it is not too grisly." The Irish Independent stated that, while it is a series aimed at teenagers, "older folk will love this cracking new series, too." Kirkus Reviews stated that the novel "benefits greatly from [Coben's] trademark crackerjack pace and multi-layered plotting." They found that the short attention span of the protagonist was "both age appropriate and believable" and that Mickey Bolitar's "mother's struggle with drug addiction adds poignancy" to the novel. In conclusion, they found it to be "a not-bad-at-all entry into the teen market for this adult author."

== Plot summary ==
Mickey Bolitar, 15, tries to figure out why his new girlfriend, Ashley Kent, stopped coming to school and has seemingly vanished. Getting no assistance from teachers or administrators, Mickey turns to a couple of fellow students for help. All the while, Mickey deals with having to live under the same roof as his estranged uncle, Myron, while his mother is checked into rehab for a depression. A strange neighbor woman who lives in an eerie mansion tells Mickey that his father is possibly still alive, even though Mickey saw him die in a car accident more than a year ago.

== Main characters ==
- Mickey Bolitar: a high school student and talented basketball player, son of Brad and Kitty Bolitar, and nephew of Myron Bolitar
- Myron Bolitar: a sports agent and Mickey's estranged uncle
- Ema: a goth with a sarcastic wit, whom Mickey rescues from humiliation in gym class
- Spoon: a socially awkward nerd who uses his hacking skills to assist Mickey in saving his father's life
- Bat Lady: a strange woman who tells Mickey that his father is possibly still alive
- Kitty Hammer Bolitar: Mickey's mother who has checked into a rehab facility

== Television adaptation ==
In April 2021, it was announced that Amazon Studios had ordered a pilot for a series based on the novel. In March 2022, it was announced that Amazon had given the production a series order. The cast would include Jaden Michael as Mickey, Constance Zimmer as Mickey's aunt Shira, Adrian Greensmith as Spoon, Abby Corrigan as Ema, and Sage Linder as Rachel Caldwell. The series, titled Harlan Coben's Shelter, premiered on August 18, 2023.
