= Swan with Two Necks, Stockport =

Listed pub in Greater Manchester, England

Swan with Two Necks
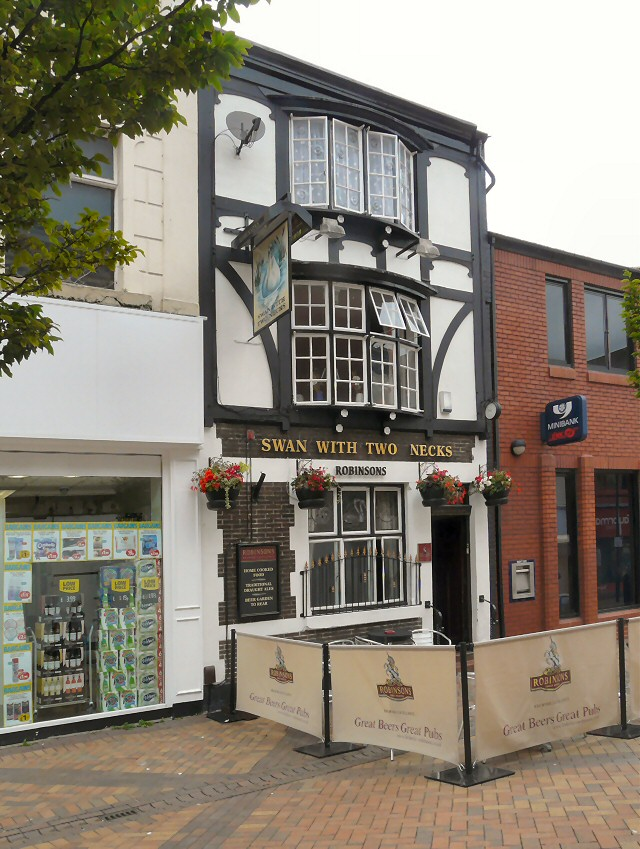
- The pub in 2013

- Location within Greater Manchester

General information
- Type: Public house
- Location: 36 Princes Street, Stockport, Greater Manchester, England
- Coordinates: 53.4120°N 2.1605°W
- Year built: 1920s or early 1930s
- Renovated: 2018 (exterior refurbished); Mid-2026 (first floor converted and refitted)
- Owner: Robinsons

Design and construction
- Designations

Listed Building – Grade II
- Official name: Swan with Two Necks public house
- Designated: 14 September 2007
- Reference no.: 1392243

Website
- Official website

The Swan with Two Necks is a Grade II listed public house on Princes Street in Stockport, Greater Manchester, England. A pub has occupied the site since about 1830, and the present building dates from the 1920s or early 1930s, following its acquisition and subsequent rebuilding by Robinsons Brewery, which still owns it. The interior is recognised by the Campaign for Real Ale (CAMRA) with a three‑star rating for its "outstanding national historic importance".

== History ==
A public house has occupied the site since roughly 1830. The building was constructed in the 1920s or early 1930s, according to its official listing, and was acquired by the Stockport‑based Robinsons Brewery in 1924, which rebuilt it within the following decade. (Note: According to the Campaign for Real Ale (CAMRA), the pub was rebuilt in 1926, after which it was acquired by Robinsons Brewery.) The 1936 Ordnance Survey map shows the building without attributing a name or designation.

The hanging pub sign in 2013

In the 1960s a modest room at the back was incorporated into the pub, becoming part of the customer areas that remain in use today, and connects to its kitchen. The interior is recognised by the Campaign for Real Ale (CAMRA) with a three‑star rating in its National Inventory of Historic Pub Interiors, indicating its status as of "outstanding national historic importance".

On 14 September 2007, the Swan with Two Necks was designated a Grade II listed building. In 2018 refurbishment of the pub's exterior led to improvements to the rear boundary wall, railings and gate, resulting in an enclosed beer garden sheltered by an awning. In 2026, a previously unused first-floor space was converted and refitted to provide a new unisex toilet and an extension of the pub's trading area.

== Architecture ==
=== Exterior ===
The building is constructed of brick, with a mix of timber and stucco on the front, and has a slate roof. It has a narrow rectangular layout with a rear wing, and a corridor running along the right side that opens out near the bar area. The rooms include a vault at the front, the servery in the centre, and a lounge at the back, which connects with the kitchen.

Facing the street, the front is a single bay and of three storeys, with one central window on each floor. The ground floor has a wide window divided into several sections, including a stained-glass panel depicting a swan with two necks. The upper floors have projecting casement windows: a larger multi‑paned one on the first floor and a smaller one above. The entrance is set slightly to the right and has a three‑panel door with an overlight.

The ground floor is finished in brick and stucco, with the building's name picked out in gold lettering above the main window. The upper floors have decorative timber-framing, with curved braces on the first floor and shaped panels on the second. A modern hanging sign completes the frontage.

=== Interior ===
Inside, the entrance leads into a small panelled lobby with one door to the vault on the left and another door ahead into the corridor. Both doors have tall panels with patterned glass at the top and brass handles, with matching glazed panels set above them. The doorway into the bar is framed by further panelling and similar overlights.

The vault has oak panelling with a simple moulding at the top, though a significant portion was installed only around 2009 and now covers what had been a fireplace. Behind it is the panelled servery, which also connects to the corridor. The corridor itself is lined with oak panelling and widens slightly in front of the servery as a drinking space. On the right are the ladies' toilets, which keep their original white, black and orange tiles, followed by an oak staircase with panelling up to dado height leading to the recently refurbished room above. A stained‑glass panel showing a two‑necked swan is set at the far end of the corridor.

Beyond the servery, to the left, is the lounge. This room also has oak panelling with a plain moulded top edge. A glazed lantern above brings in natural light, and the lobby screen remains in place. The lounge retains fixed upholstered seating with bell pushes set into the panelling, and it has a stone fireplace in a Tudor style.

== In popular culture ==
The Swan with Two Necks was used as a filming location for the BBC One 1930s period drama television series Our Zoo, which aired in 2014.

== See also ==
- Listed buildings in Stockport
- Listed pubs in Greater Manchester
