= Harlan Coben's Shelter =

2023 American television series

- Promotional poster
- Also known as: Shelter
- Genre: Drama; Mystery; Thriller
- Based on: Shelter by Harlan Coben
- Developed by: Harlan Coben; Charlotte Coben
- Showrunners: Harlan Coben; Allen MacDonald
- Starring: Jaden Michael; Constance Zimmer; Adrian Greensmith; Abby Corrigan; Sage Linder; Brian Altemus
- Country of origin: United States
- Original language: English
- No. of seasons: 1
- No. of episodes: 8

Production
- Executive producers: Erik Barmack; Rola Bauer; Patricia Cardoso; Harlan Coben; Allen MacDonald; Edward Ornelas
- Producer: Charlotte Coben
- Cinematography: John B. Aronson; Sarah Cawley
- Editors: Sean Cusack; Guillermo de la Cal
- Running time: 45–57 minutes
- Production companies: Final Twist Productions; MGM Television; Amazon Studios

Original release
- Network: Amazon Prime Video
- Release: August 18 – September 22, 2023

Harlan Coben's Shelter, or simply Shelter, is an American mystery drama television series starring Jaden Michael, Constance Zimmer, Abby Corrigan, and Adrian Greensmith. It is based on the 2011 young adult novel Shelter by Harlan Coben. The series was released on Amazon Prime Video on August 18, 2023. In November 2023, the series was canceled after one season.

== Synopsis ==
After his father's sudden death, Mickey Bolitar starts a new life in Kasselton, New Jersey, where he becomes entangled in the mysterious disappearance of Ashley Kent, a student at his school, leading him to discover a dark underworld in the quiet suburban community.

== Cast ==
=== Main ===
- Jaden Michael as Mickey Bolitar
- Constance Zimmer as Shira Bolitar
- Adrian Greensmith as Arthur Jean "Spoon" Spindell, Jr.
- Abby Corrigan as Emma "Ema" Winslow
- Sage Linder as Rachel Caldwell
- Brian Altemus as Troy Taylor

=== Recurring ===
- Didi Conn as Mrs. Martha Friedman
- Peter Riegert as Allen Bolitar
- Adrienne Barbeau as Ellen Bolitar
- Kristoffer Polaha as Brad Bolitar
- Narci Regina as Kitty Bolitar
- Stephanie March as Angelica Wyatt
- Antonio Cipriano as Buck Renna
- Alexa Mareka as Whitney Renna
- Manuel Uriza as Antoine "Octoface" Lemaire
- Samantha Bugliaro as Ashley Kent
- Geoffrey Cantor as Barry "Mr. V" Vollmer
- Tovah Feldshuh as Elizabeth "Lizzy"/"Bat Lady" Sobek
- Missi Pyle as Hannah Taylor (née Smith)
- Lee Aaron Rosen as Chief Taylor

=== Guest ===
- Hunter Emery as Sunglasses Man
- Dustin Charles as Arthur Jean Spindell, Sr.
- Sophia Adler as Candy

== Episodes ==
No.	Title	Directed by	Written by	Original release date
1	"Pilot"	Patricia Cardoso	Teleplay by : Harlan Coben & Charlotte Coben and Ed Decter	August 18, 2023
2	"Catch Me If U Can"	Edward Ornelas	Teleplay by : Charlotte Coben	August 18, 2023
3	"The Dirt Locker"	Christina Choe	Nicki Renna	August 18, 2023
4	"Phantom Threads"	Christina Choe	Charlotte Coben	August 25, 2023
5	"See Me Feel Me Touch Me Heal Me"	Deborah Kampmeier	Alfredo Barrios Jr	September 1, 2023
6	"Candy's Room"	Deborah Kampmeier	Allen MacDonald	September 8, 2023
7	"Sweet Dreams Are Made of This"	Edward Ornelas	Alfredo Barrios Jr & Nicki Renna	September 15, 2023
8	"Found"	Edward Ornelas	Harlan Coben & Charlotte Coben	September 22, 2023

== Production ==
On April 19, 2021, it was reported that Amazon Studios had ordered a pilot episode based on Harlan Coben's young adult novel Shelter, the first in his Mickey Bolitar trilogy, and that MGM had acquired the rights to all the books in the series. It was also reported that Ed Decter would serve as showrunner.

On September 23, 2021, it was announced that Jaden Michael had been cast in the lead role. It was also announced that Decter had exited the series, and that Coben would now be serving as showrunner. On October 5, 2021, it was announced that Constance Zimmer had joined the cast as Shira Bolitar, Mickey's aunt. On October 27, 2021, it was announced that Adrian Greensmith, Abby Corrigan, and Sage Linder had been added to the cast. The pilot episode was written by Harlan Coben and Charlotte Coben and directed by Patricia Cardoso. It wrapped filming in New Jersey at the end of 2021.

On March 15, 2022, it was announced that Shelter had been given a series order by Amazon Studios, to be produced alongside MGM International Television Productions. The series was filmed mostly at Kearny Point in Kearny, New Jersey, in the summer and fall of 2022. Harlan Coben and Allen MacDonald are co-showrunners and executive producers, and the series is also executive produced by Edward Ornelas, Erik Barmack, and Patricia Cardoso, with Charlotte Coben as producer.

On November 21, 2023, it was reported that the series had been canceled after one season.

== Release ==
The first episode was screened at the Monte-Carlo Television Festival on June 16, 2023. The first three episodes of the series were released on Prime Video on August 18, 2023, with new episodes each Friday through the season finale on September 22, 2023.

== Reception ==
On review aggregator Rotten Tomatoes, Harlan Coben's Shelter has an approval rating of 88% based on 25 reviews, with an average rating of 6.5 out of 10. The website's general consensus reads, "Carrying off a mature mystery with a light touch, Shelter is an absorbing and spry adaptation of Harlan Coben's work." Metacritic calculated an average of 65 out of 100 based on 13 reviews, indicating "generally favorable reviews".
