= Whitney Woerz =

American singer-songwriter

Whitney Whitney
- Born: October 22, 2000 (age 25)
- Origin: New York City
- Genres: Pop, alternative pop
- Occupations: Singer, songwriter
- Instrument: Vocals
- Years active: 2015–present
- Labels: 600 Volt | Sony RED, 10:22 pm/Island Records, Atlantic Records
- Website: whitneywhitney.com

Whitney Woerz (born October 22, 2000), also known professionally as Whitney Whitney, is an American singer-songwriter based in New York City. She began her career releasing pop and alternative pop music under her birth name before later rebranding as Whitney Whitney. Her music often explores themes of mental health, personal growth, and emotional introspection.

Woerz's first album, titled Live from Muscle Shoals: The Fame Sessions, was released in November 2015. She has released multiple singles and EPs across her career, including recent work under the name Whitney Whitney.

== Early life ==
Woerz was born on October 22, 2000 in New Canaan, Connecticut where she attended elementary and middle school. Woerz fell “in love with performance” as an elementary school student, when she enrolled in vocal lessons from as early as kindergarten and began performing in musical theatre shortly after. In 2011, Woerz began touring the Tri-State Area with Random Farms Kids’ Theater as a cast member of their various productions, and she was honored in 2015 for exemplary involvement in its musical theatre programs. Notably, Woerz performed in the non-profit organization's anti-bullying production, “The New Kid,” for four years. Woerz also appeared a handful of times on NBC's Saturday Night Live as a child actor.

Woerz was bullied by other students throughout school for her participation in performing arts and body-shamed for her larger frame and curly hair. Due to this experience, Woerz moved to Manhattan, New York, in 2016, where she attended Laguardia High School of Performing Arts.

== Career ==
=== 2014 ===
In 2014, an online friend confided in a 13-year-old Woerz that she had self-harmed and was having suicidal thoughts. Woerz called Bring Change 2 Mind, a mental health awareness organization, to ask for advice, and the organization directed Woerz to Suicide Hotline. After calling them for assistance, Woerz sat down and wrote a song, titled “Ghost Story”, and sent a video recording of it to her suicidal friend in the hopes of comforting her.

Following this experience, Woerz sent “Ghost Story” to Bring Change 2 Mind and the non-profit company's co-founder, Glenn Close, took an interest in the song as its message and BC2M's closely aligned. Woerz began working with the organization as a teen ambassador, which she has done ever since.

Woerz also sent “Ghost Story” to Nashville, Tennessee based music producer Glenn Rosenstein. Rosenstein then began working with Woerz in late 2014 as the artist's manager and producer.

=== 2015 ===
In 2015, Woerz signed onto the music label 600 Volt and entered a distribution deal with Sony Music Label's RED banner. Working closely with Rosenstein, Woerz began recording her debut EP Behind the Smile in January 2015 at Capitol Studios in Los Angeles, CA. A music video for “Loss & Love”, directed by Tony Deemer, was released on November 24, 2015, preceding the EP.

In 2015, Woerz recorded an album of covers at the FAME Recording Studios in Muscle Shoals, Alabama. The album, titled LIVE from Muscle Shoals: The Fame Sessions, was released on November 25, 2015.

=== 2016 ===
On February 11, 2016, a music video for “6 Second Love”, directed by Joe Petrilla was released in anticipation of Behind the Smile's Summer release. The song found viral success thanks in part to Petrilla's video, which centered around social media, and was performed by Woerz on Elvis Duran's Artist of the Week segment of Today in April 2016.

In mid-2016, Bring Change 2 Mind collaborated with Woerz to produce a music video for “Ghost Story” with the intent of destigmatizing mental illness. BC2M co-founder Glenn Close personally called documentarian Liz Garbus to direct.

The six-minute music video, which was Garbus's first in the genre, was filmed as a hybrid documentary-music video style piece that featured interviews with teenagers interspersed throughout, centered around their experiences with depression and mental health. Following a “very long and intense casting process” in which an open casting call drew the interest of over a thousand teens, only fifteen of whom were given permission by their families and guardians to participate, the video began production in April 2016. It released on June 24, 2016.

Behind the Smile was officially released in June 2016 and included notable songs “Ghost Story” and “6 Second Love.”

=== 2017 ===
Woerz began work on a sophomore EP titled Iridescent in mid-2016. It was slated for a Summer 2017 release, but for reasons unknown, it was not released, though it was said to be about the “emotional challenges of today’s youth.”

Iridescent's lead single “Idea of Her”, however, was officially released on July 7, 2017. A music video directed by Miles Szanto was released on June 29, 2017, ahead of the single's digital release. The song, which dealt with the issues of superficiality and physical insecurity, charted in the top 40 on the Mediabase Published Hot Adult Contemporary Chart and Billboard Adult Top 40 Chart.

=== 2018 ===
Woerz followed up “Idea of Her” the following year with the single “Love Me Not”, which was released on August 3, 2018. Woerz once again charted in the top 40 on Mediabase and Billboard with the single.

“Love Me Not”, co-written by Woerz along with Dan Muckala, Kipp Williams, and Vanessa Campagna, marked Woerz's first venture into co-writing music. Having only written alone before, Woerz remarked that she experienced some ageism when working on songs with older writers at the age of 17. Trudy Bellinger directed the music video for “Love Me Not” that released on October 26, 2018. The video juxtaposed a modern aesthetic with 1940's Americana.

Woerz went on a North American tour beginning in April 2018 with Nina Nesbitt headlining. Woerz opened for Nesbitt in eight states on the East Coast.

=== 2019 ===
Woerz continued to release singles with 600 Volt/RED throughout 2019. “Little Bit More” released on May 10, 2019, and Dylan Marko Bell directed a music video for the song that released on July 26, 2019.

“CARE” released on October 11, 2019, and marked a stylistic shift in Woerz's music toward the chillwave, alt-pop genre. Joe Petrilla returned to direct the video for “CARE.” The video released on October 11, 2019. It took on a less cinematic, more stripped-down style in the vein of Woerz's sonic evolution.

Before finishing her senior year of high school, Woerz went on another North American tour. She opened for Jesse McCartney in 22 different states across the United States while on the Resolution Tour.

=== 2020 ===
In 2020, Woerz signed with Universal Music Group under their 10:22 pm and Island Record labels. She released three singles with UMG.

“Weirdos” was the first single to release under UMG on June 26, 2020. A music video directed by Nicholas Ferguson-Lee released on June 25, 2020. “Weirdos” continued Woerz's foray into the alt-pop genre with its accompanying video taking on a low-framerate, alternative aesthetic. It was also the first Woerz song to not be produced by Rosenstein; Stefan Lit produced “Weirdos.”

“Retrograde” debuted on August 21, 2020. The single was inspired by the COVID-19 pandemic and co-written with Amanda “Ayelle” Lundstedt and Stavro Adamntios Tsarouhas. Stavros also acted as producer. A music video directed by Hunter Airheart was released on August 27, 2020.

In December, Woerz released a cover of Christmas Time is Here.

Following this period, Woerz took a step back from releasing music under her birth name before re-emerging with a new artistic direction.

=== 2025–present: Rebrand as Whitney Whitney ===
After a period of releasing music under her birth name, Woerz reintroduced herself under the moniker Whitney Whitney. The rebrand marked a shift toward a more cinematic and alternative pop sound, accompanied by a new visual identity and artistic direction.

Under the name Whitney Whitney, she released the single "Does The Narcissist Need A Kiss" in 2025, followed by her debut EP under the new name, 1.1. She later released the single "Isabelle" in 2025.

In 2026, Whitney Whitney released the single "A Man Written by a Woman", followed by the EP 1.2.

== Personal life ==
Whitney Woerz graduated from Laguardia High School in 2019. She resides in Nashville, Tennessee and attends classes at Belmont University.

Woerz is a mental health activist and has collaborated with the non-profit organization Bring Change 2 Mind since 2014.

Woerz experienced a spiritual awakening in 2020, now advocating for living with positivity and light and letting go of things that no longer serve you. She refers to herself as a “quantum being” on social media.

Woerz is the daughter of Managing Partner and business owner of Media Storm, A Merkle Company, Craig Woerz and sibling to Broadway performer Ashton Woerz.

== Discography ==
=== As Whitney Woerz ===
==== Studio albums ====
Year	Title	Label
2015	Live from Muscle Shoals: The Fame Sessions	600 Volt / Sony RED

==== EPs ====
Year	Title	Label
2016	Behind the Smile	600 Volt / Sony RED

==== Singles ====
Title	Year	Label
"Ghost Story (Radio Remix)"	2017	600 Volt / Sony RED
"Idea of Her"	2017	600 Volt / Sony RED
"Idea of Her (Acoustic Version)"	2017	600 Volt / Sony RED
"Idea of Her (SMLE Remix)"	2018	600 Volt / Sony RED
"Love Me Not"	2018	600 Volt / Sony RED
"Little Bit More"	2019	600 Volt / AntiFragile Music
"CARE"	2019	600 Volt / AntiFragile Music
"Weirdos"	2020	UMG Recordings, Inc. (10:22 pm/Island Records)
"Weirdos (Acoustic)"	2020	UMG Recordings, Inc. (10:22 pm/Island Records)
"Retrograde"	2020	UMG Recordings, Inc. (10:22 pm/Island Records)
"Christmas Time Is Here"	2020	UMG Recordings, Inc. (10:22 pm/Island Records)

==== Music videos ====
Title	Year	Director
"Loss & Love"	2015	Tony Deemer
"6 Second Love"	2016	Joe Petrilla
"Ghost Story"	2016	Liz Garbus
"Idea of Her"	2017	Miles Szanto
"Love Me Not"	2018	Trudy Bellinger
"Little Bit More"	2019	Dylan Marko Bell
"CARE"	2019	Joe Petrilla
"Weirdos"	2020	Nicholas Ferguson-Lee
"Retrograde"	2020	Hunter Airheart

=== As Whitney Whitney ===
==== EPs ====
Year	Title	Label
2025	1.1	Atlantic Records
2026	1.2	Atlantic Records

==== Singles ====
Title	Year	Label
"Does The Narcissist Need A Kiss"	2025	Atlantic Records
"Isabelle"	2025	Atlantic Records
"A Man Written by a Woman"	2026	Atlantic Records
