= Simone Dinnerstein =

American classical pianist

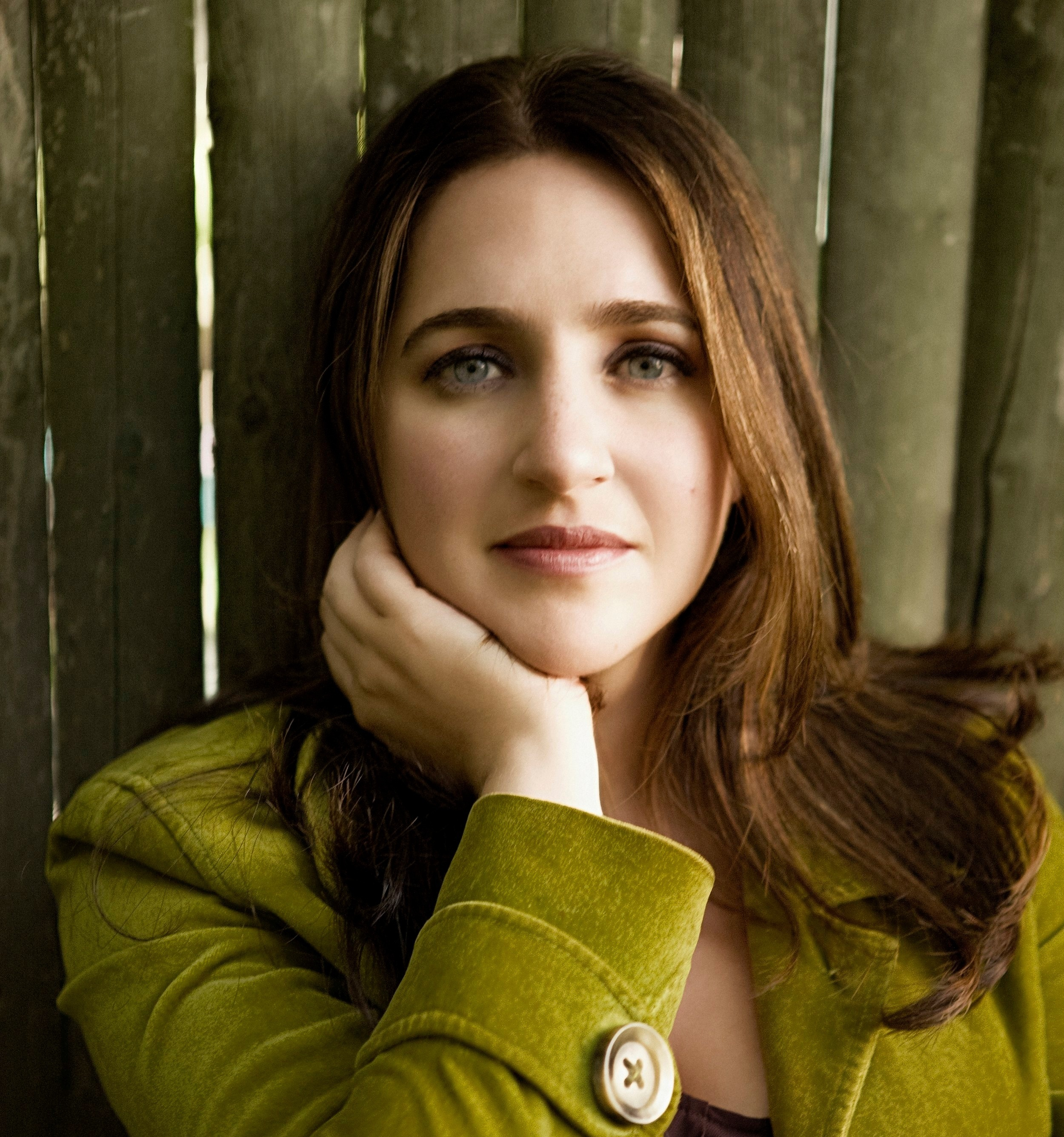
Simone Dinnerstein

Simone Andrea Dinnerstein (/ˈdɪnərˌstiːn/) (born September 18, 1972) is an American classical pianist.

== Early life and education ==
Dinnerstein was born in New York City, United States to a Jewish family. She is the daughter of Renee and Simon Dinnerstein. She studied in the pre-college program at the Manhattan School of Music with Solomon Mikowsky. At age 15 she auditioned in London with Maria Curcio, a student of Artur Schnabel – on this trip she also met her future husband, Jeremy Greensmith. At age 18 she dropped out of The Juilliard School of Music to study in London with Curcio for six years. She later returned to New York and Juilliard, where she studied with Peter Serkin.

== Career ==
=== Goldberg Variations ===
When in 2007 the Telarc label released her self-financed recording of Johann Sebastian Bach's Goldberg Variations (Telarc CD-80692), Dinnerstein's career was "launched into the stratosphere", as the album outsold The White Stripes on Amazon.com. In its first week of commercial release, the recording was at No.1 on the Billboard classical music CD sales chart. The disc appeared on a number of “Best of 2007” lists, including those of The New York Times, the Los Angeles Times, The New Yorker, Time Out New York, several radio stations, iTunes “Editor’s Choice Best Classical,” Amazon.com Best CDs of 2007, and Barnes & Noble's Top 5 Debut CDs of 2007.

=== Subsequent work ===
Dinnerstein recorded a recital live at the Berlin Philharmonie, on November 22, 2007. The program included Aaron Copland's "Piano Variations," and Anton Webern's “Variations" – but neither was to be included on the concert CD. She next focused on three Bach-related works to be included on the CD, Bach's French Suites No. 5 in G (BWV 816); the premiere recording of Twelve Variations on a Chorale by J. S. Bach by the American composer Philip Lasser (b. 1963), and the Piano Sonata no. 32, op. 111, by Beethoven (with a first movement that makes extensive use of fugal textures reminiscent of Bach). The recording was released by Telarc on August 26, 2008.

In addition to her solo recital work, she has been a featured guest artist at the Bard Music Festival. In addition, she has appeared as a chamber musician in performances of contemporary music, including works of Yehudi Wyner and Ned Rorem.

Dinnerstein has toured as piano soloist with the Dresden Philharmonic and Czech Philharmonic. She has performed with the Jerusalem Symphony Orchestra, the Stuttgart Radio Symphony Orchestra, the New Jersey Symphony Orchestra, New York City's Orchestra of St. Luke's, the New York Philharmonic, and the Absolute Ensemble.

In 2015 and 2017, she performed with the Naumburg Orchestral Concerts, in the Naumburg Bandshell, Central Park, in the summer series.

=== Signed with Sony Classical ===
In 2010, Simone Dinnerstein signed with Sony Classical, In January 2011, she released her first album on the label, entitled Bach: A Strange Beauty. In its first week of commercial release, the recording made its debut at No.1 on the Billboard Traditional Classical Chart. Bach: A Strange Beauty also spent time as the top selling album on Barnesandnoble.com and number two-selling album on Amazon.com. Dinnerstein was also featured on CBS Sunday Morning. Her second Sony Classical album, Something Almost Being Said: Music of Bach and Schubert, was released in January 2012.

In 2013, Dinnerstein released a Sony album with singer-songwriter Tift Merritt called Night. That year she also released on Sony an album called Bach Re-Invented, which interspersed Bach with new compositions based on Bach by Daniel Schnyder (a Swiss composer and jazz saxophonist and flutist), Tom Trapp, and Gene Pritsker. On the album, the Absolute Ensemble was conducted by Kristjan Järvi.

In 2014, Sony released Dinnerstein's recording of Bach's Inventions and Sinfonias.

In February 2015, Sony released a recording featuring Dinnerstein as soloist, entitled Broadway-Lafayette. It includes three works: the Piano Concerto of Maurice Ravel; the Rhapsody in Blue of George Gershwin; and a new concerto composed for her in 2012 by Philip Lasser entitled The Circle and the Child: Concerto for Piano and Orchestra, which was inspired by a chorale of Johann Sebastian Bach, Ihr Gestirn, ihr hohen Lüfte. On the recording, Dinnerstein is accompanied by the MDR Leipzig Radio Symphony Orchestra conducted by Kristjan Järvi.

== Personal life ==
Dinnerstein resides in the Park Slope section of Brooklyn, New York, with her British husband, Jeremy Greensmith, a former journalist. He now teaches fifth grade at New York elementary school P.S. 321. Among the students at the school in the 2000s was the couple's son, Adrian Greensmith. Dinnerstein's mother, Renee Dinnerstein, taught early childhood education at P.S. 321 for eighteen years and in 2010 was running the blog "Investigating Choice Time: Inquiry, Exploration and Play".

Dinnerstein's father, Simon Dinnerstein, is an artist, as was her uncle, Harvey Dinnerstein.
