= Harvey Dinnerstein =

American painter (1928–2022)

- Born: April 3, 1928; Brooklyn, New York, U.S.
- Died: June 21, 2022 (aged 94); Brooklyn, New York, U.S.
- Education: High School of Music & Art; Art Students League of New York; Tyler School of Art
- Known for: Painting, Drawing
- Movement: Classical Realism
- Spouse: Lois Behrke Dinnerstein
- Relatives: Simon Dinnerstein (brother); Simone Dinnerstein (niece); Adrian Greensmith (great-nephew)
- Awards: Honorary Doctorate, Lyme Academy College of Fine Arts

Harvey Dinnerstein (April 3, 1928 – June 21, 2022) was an American figurative artist and educator. A draftsman and painter in the realistic tradition, his work included genre paintings, contemporary narratives, complex figurative compositions, portraits, and intimate images of his family and friends.

== Early life and education ==
Dinnerstein was born in Brooklyn, New York. His father, Louis, was a pharmacist and his mother, Sarah (Kobilansky), a homemaker. At 14 he entered the High School of Music & Art. He studied with Moses Soyer, Yasuo Kuniyoshi, and Julian E. Levi at the Art Students League of New York.

From 1947 to graduation in 1950, Dinnerstein studied at the Tyler School of Art at Temple University in Philadelphia. He was drafted into the Army and served at Fort Monmouth, New Jersey. Upon his return to New York City in the early 1950s, he was one of a group of recent Tyler graduates who resisted the prevailing style of Abstract Expressionism in order to paint in a figurative mode.

== Career ==
In 1955, Dinnerstein made his solo debut in New York with an exhibition at the Davis Galleries in Manhattan. A New York Times reviewer likened his "deft and subtle figure drawings" to works by French artist Édouard Vuillard. Inspired by the Montgomery, Alabama, bus boycott of 1956, Dinnerstein traveled south to document the Civil Rights upheaval through a series of drawings. This interest in cultural and moral issues continued to inform drawings and paintings that recorded the social unrest of the 1960s. Esquire magazine sent him to Washington in 1968 to document the Poor People's Campaign.

From 1965 to 1980 Dinnerstein taught at the School of Visual Arts in New York City, and from 1975 to 1992 at the National Academy of Design, of which he was elected a member in 1974. He taught at the Art Students League from 1980 to 2020. He received an Honorary Doctorate from the Lyme Academy College of Fine Arts in Old Lyme, Connecticut, in 1998.

Dinnerstein participated in numerous exhibitions in galleries and museums throughout the United States. His work is in the permanent collections of the Butler Institute of American Art, the Metropolitan Museum of Art, the Whitney Museum of American Art, Museum of the City of New York, National Academy of Design, National Museum of American Art, and the Pennsylvania Academy of the Fine Arts.

His book Harvey Dinnerstein: An Artist at Work was published in 1978 by Watson-Guptill.

== Personal life ==
Dinnerstein was the husband of Lois (Behrke) Dinnerstein, an art historian; the older brother of figurative artist Simon Dinnerstein, and the uncle of concert pianist Simone Dinnerstein. He died at a hospital in Brooklyn from complications of a fall on June 21, 2022, at the age of 94.
