= Simon Dinnerstein =

American artist

- Born: February 16, 1943 (age 83); Brooklyn, New York
- Education: City College of New York, Brooklyn Museum Art School, Hochschule fur Bildende Künste, Kassel, Germany
- Known for: Painting, drawing, printmaking
- Notable work: The Fulbright Triptych, In Sleep, Passage of the Moon
- Movement: Figurative art
- Children: Simone Dinnerstein
- Relatives: Harvey Dinnerstein (brother); Adrian Greensmith (grandson)
- Awards: Fulbright Fellowship, Germany; Rome Prize, American Academy in Rome
- Website: simondinnerstein.com

Simon Dinnerstein (born February 16, 1943) is an American artist, best known for the painted work, The Fulbright Triptych (1971).

== Early life and education ==
Dinnerstein was born in Brownsville, Brooklyn, New York, in 1943 to pharmacist Louis and homemaker Sarah Dinnerstein. The second of two sons, he has an older brother, Harvey Dinnerstein, who also became an artist.

Dinnerstein holds a Bachelor of Arts in history from the City College of New York. He studied painting and drawing at the Brooklyn Museum Art School with Louis Grebenak, David Levine, and Richard Mayhew.

== Career ==
He was a member of the faculty at the New School for Social Research, Parsons School of Design, and New York City Technical College. He lectures widely and has lectured at Pennsylvania State University.

=== The Fulbright Triptych ===
Dinnerstein's most notable painting, The Fulbright Triptych, was started in Germany in 1971 while he served as a Fulbright Scholar in Graphics. It was completed in 1974. A largely autobiographical work, it combines stark realism with American figurative tradition to produce a secular rendering of the usually religious form, the triptych.

Writer Jonathan Lethem commented: "Simon Dinnerstein's The Fulbright Triptych is one of those singular and astonishing works of art which seem to imply a description of the whole world merely by insisting on a scrupulous gaze at one perfect instant." The oil-on-wood painting consists of three panels approximately 14 feet wide, depicting a graphic artist's studio. Three figures, representing the Dinnerstein family, occupy the outer panels. The central panel consists of the artist's desk, engraving tools, a copper disk of the commissioned Fulbright engraving project, and an outward view in perspective of Hessisch Lichtenau (near to Kassel). Plants, photographs, old master's paintings, children's grade school writing, and an exit visa from Russia, appear tacked to the wall of the studio. The Triptych is noted for its symmetry, meticulous detail, mixture of textures, and sense of space.

Widely praised, with each viewer bringing a different sensibility and interpretation of the work, the painting is the subject of numerous essays, articles, and books, including The Suspension of Time: Reflections of Simon Dinnerstein's 'The Fulbright Triptych' edited by Daniel Slager, published 2011.

=== Style and influences ===
Dinnerstein's art is mostly in the figurative style, with folk, expressionistic, and surrealistic influences, possessing a "narrative" and "psychological edge". He uses a variety of media, pencils, charcoal, and oil paints. Dinnerstein renders still-lifes, but most of his work involves portraiture or human figures. He often "paints the figure in unexpected juxtaposition with landscape or interior elements", of which Dinnerstein says,

What interests me is the ability of Degas, Balthus, Lucian Freud and Antonio López García ... to deal with the figure ... to create art ... rich in scale, yet abstract adventurous, experimental ... deeply human ... a combination of modernism and tradition of skill medium and ... a fresh, personal response to the human form in art ... Hopefully my work speaks to these issues.

Often the human figures are portrayed against a background of hyperreality, or in dreamy surreal landscapes. Light plays an important role in Dinnerstein's work achieving "an inwardness ... in the play of light that radiates from the object and renders it mysterious" or makes "Brooklyn sunlight on an ordinary floor seem supernatural." The use of light contributes to Dinnerstein's paintings being described as "magical realism". In early Dinnerstein works, strong left-right symmetry prevails, although later works are noted for their asymmetry. Dinnerstein draws on diverse sources for inspiration: Northern European art (Albrecht Dürer, Hieronymus Bosch), Mexican art (Frida Kahlo, Diego Rivera), as well as literature (D. H. Lawrence, August Strindberg) and film (Ingmar Bergman, Alfred Hitchcock).

== Personal life ==
In 1965, Dinnerstein married Renée Sudler, a noted educational consultant. Renée Dinnerstein is the author of the book Choice Time: How to Deepen Learning Through Inquiry and Play, PreK-2 published in August 2016. She runs the popular blog, Investigating Choice Time: Inquiry, Exploration and Play. They have a daughter, Simone Dinnerstein, a concert pianist. Both wife and daughter (as an infant) figure prominently in The Fulbright Triptych as well as other works.

Dinnerstein resides in Brooklyn, where, in addition to practicing his art, he teaches classes on art history and appreciation.

== Videos and podcasts ==
- Simone Dinnerstein and Simon Dinnerstein In Conversation: An Interview with Robin Quivers at Consulate General of Germany, 2011
- Triptych: An Evening of Painting and Music (Simon Dinnerstein, The Fulbright Triptych and Robert Sirota, "Triptych", performed by the Chiara String Quartet)
- Simon Dinnerstein Exhibit at the Tenri Gallery: A Walk Through with Francis Cunningham, 2011
- Simon Dinnerstein and The Fulbright Triptych, audiocast interview with James McElhinney, Huffington Post, April 1, 2013
- “Simone Dinnerstein and Simon Dinnerstein: A Conversation on the Mysteries of Art and Family, 2018

== List of awards ==
- Scholarship, Brooklyn Museum Art School (BMAS), 1964–67
- First Prize, BMAS, 1967
- Purchase Award, DRAWINGS USA, Minnesota Museum of American Art, 1968
- MacDowell Colony Fellowship, 1969
- Fulbright Fellowship, Germany, in Graphics, 1970–71
- Honorable Mention, Edwin Austin Abbey Fellowship for Mural Painting, National Academy of Design, New York, 1975
- Purchase Award, DRAWINGS USA, MMAA, 1975
- Childe Hassam Purchase Award for Painting, American Academy of Arts and Letters, 1976
- Louis Comfort Tiffany Foundation Grant, 1976
- E.D. Foundation Grant for study at the American Academy in Rome, 1977
- Rome Prize Fellowship, American Academy in Rome, 1976–78 (Lazarus Fellow, Metropolitan Museum of Art)
- Ingram Merrill Award for Painting, Ingram Merrill Foundation, 1978–79
- E.D. Foundation Grant, for study at the American Academy in Rome, 1978
- Childe Hassam Purchase Award for Painting, American Academy of Arts and Letters, 1978
- MacDowell Colony Fellowship, 1979
- Artists Space Grant, New York, 1983
- Stefan Hirsch Memorial Award, Audubon Artists, New York, 1984
- Artists Space Grant, New York, 1985
- New York Foundation for the Arts Fellowship in Drawing, 1987
- Artists Space Grant, New York, 1987
- Cannon Prize, 163rd Annual Exhibition, National Academy of Design, New York, 1988
- Elected Member, National Academy of Design, New York, 1992
- Ralph Fabri Prize for a graphic, 172nd Annual Exhibition, National Academy of Design, New York, 1997
- Paul and Margaret Bertelson Prize for a portrait in any medium, 173rd Annual Exhibition, National Academy of Design, New York, 1998
- Robert Lehman Foundation Grant, 1999–2000
- Puffin Foundation Grant, 2011

== Exhibitions ==
- 1975 - Staempfli Gallery, New York
- 1976–1977 - The Fulbright Triptych, Institute of International Education, New York
- 1977 - American Academy in Rome, Italy
- 1979 - Institute of International Education, New York; Staempfli Gallery, New York
- 1981 - The New School for Social Research, New York
- 1985 - Gallery 1199, The Martin Luther King Jr. Labor Center, New York
- 1987 - Pratt Institute, Brooklyn, New York
- 1988 - Staempfli Gallery, New York
- 1991 - Saint Paul's School, Hargate Center, Concord, New Hampshire
- 1993 - New School for Social Research, New York
- 1999–2000 - Walton Arts Center, Joy Pratt Markham Gallery, Fayetteville, Arkansas
- 2000 - Harnett Museum of Art, University of Richmond, Virginia
- 2000 - Texarkana Regional Arts Center, Texarkana, Texas/Arkansas
- 1999 - Saint Peter's Church, New York (Retrospective Exhibition, The Fulbright Triptych and Flower Market, Rome)
- 1999 - Bread and Roses Gallery, The Martin Luther King Jr. Labor Center, NY
- 1999 - ACA Galleries, New York, Recent Paintings and Drawings
- 2006 - Simon Dinnerstein, Open Studio: The Palette Paintings, Park Slope, Brooklyn, New York
- 2008 - Simon Dinnerstein: One-Man Exhibit, Rainbow Room, New York
- 2010 - Simon Dinnerstein – Giclee Prints, Loupe Digital Studio
- 2010 - Simon Dinnerstein-Giclee Prints, Open Studio, Park Slope, Brooklyn, New York
- 2011 - The Fulbright Triptych and Selected Paintings, Tenri Gallery, New York
- 2011–2014 - The Fulbright Triptych, German Consulate of New York, on extended loan from the Palmer Museum of Art at Pennsylvania State University
- 2014–2015 - The Fubright Triptych, University of Arkansas School of Law, Fayetteville, Arkansas, on extended loan from the Palmer Museum of Art at Penn. State University
- 2017 - The Lasting World: Simon Dinnerstein and The Fulbright Triptych, Museum of Art and Archaeology at the University of Missouri, Columbia, Missouri
- 2018 - The Lasting World: Simon Dinnerstein and The Fulbright Triptych, Arnot Art Museum, Elmira, New York

== Articles and reviews ==
- Michael Andre, Simon Dinnerstein (Staempfli), Art News, March, 1975
- John Gruen, "On Art: Freilicher, Fish, Dinnerstein, Peterson, Baber", SoHo Weekly News, February 6, 1975
- George Staempfli, catalog essay, one-man exhibit, Staempfli Gallery, January 14 – February 8, 1975
- Bennett Schiff, On a Roman Hill Scholars Dwell in an Estate Of Mind, Smithsonian, March, 1978
- Doug Turetsky, Simon Dinnerstein: Artist in the Round, Brooklyn Affairs, April, 1985
- Simon Dinnerstein, Looking At One's Own Artwork, American Artist, April, 1986
- Theodore Wolff, The Kind Word for Such Art is 'Conservative'. The Christian Science Monitor, April 25, 1988
- Albert Boime, Introduction: Simon Dinnerstein's Family Romance, The Art of Simon Dinnerstein, The University of Arkansas Press, 1990
- Thomas M. Messer, Foreword, The Art of Simon Dinnerstein, The University of Arkansas Press, 1990, ISBN 978-1557281425
- Richard Mertens, Essential Realities: Simon Dinnerstein Draws the Essence of Art from the Commonplace, The Concord Monitor, October 25, 1991
- Rudolph Arnheim, Pictures of the Lasting World, Simon Dinnerstein: Paintings and Drawings, Hudson Hills Press, (October 12, 1999) ISBN 978-0965048545
- Deborah McLeod, From Visceral Portraits to Romanticized Nymphs, Bodies of Work, Richmond Times, September 1, 2000
- Edward Sullivan, The Urban View in the Art of Simon Dinnerstein, Simon Dinnerstein: Paintings and Drawings, Hudson Hills Press, 2000
- Roy Proctor, Exploring the Edge: No Slave to fashion, artist draws us into other states of mind, Richmond Times-Dispatch, August 20, 2000
- Joe Maniscalco, An Artist at Work: Park Slope Painter Lets You in on the Creative Process, Park Slope Courier, January 31, 2000
- Ilana Abramovitch, From Brownsville to Park Slope: An Interview with Simon Dinnerstein, Jews of Brooklyn, Brandeis University Press; 1st edition (November 1, 2001) ISBN 978-1584650034
- Gabriela Lena Frank, Ghosts in the Dream Machine for Piano Quintet, (Composer's Statement), March 14, 2005 Composer's Statement
- Cynthia Maris Dantzic 100 New York Painters Publisher: Schiffer Publishing Ltd., (November 2006) ISBN 978-0764325434, page 85
- Elana Hagler, Pursuing Humanity: An Interview with Simon Dinnerstein, April 21, 2013 Pursuing Humanity:An Interview with Simon Dinnerstein
- Featuring: Simon Dinnerstein, Colored Pencil magazine, December 2014

== Books ==
- The Art of Simon Dinnerstein, The University of Arkansas Press, Fayetteville, London, 1990. Essays by Albert Boime, Thomas M. Messer, George Tooker.
- Simon Dinnerstein: Paintings and Drawings, Hudson Hills Press, New York, 1999. Essays by Rudolf Arnheim, Guy Davenport, Robert L. McGrath, John Russell, Edward J. Sullivan, Miller Willams.
- The Suspension of Time: Reflections on Simon Dinnerstein and 'The Fulbright Triptych', Daniel Slager (Editor), Publisher: Milkweed Editions; First Edition (June 14, 2011). Forty-five essays on The Fulbright Triptych.
