= 2011 in public domain =

When a work's copyright expires, it enters the public domain. The following is a list of works that entered the public domain in 2011. Since laws vary globally, the copyright status of some works are not uniform.

== Entered the public domain in countries with life + 70 years ==
With the exception of Belarus & Spain (which has a copyright term of Life + 80 years for creators that died before 1987), a work enters the public domain in Europe 70 years after the creator's death, if it was published during the creator's lifetime. The list is sorted alphabetically and includes a notable work of the creator that entered the public domain on January 1, 2011.

Names	Country	Birth	Death	Occupation	Notable work
J.-H. Rosny aîné	Belgium; France	17 February 1856	11 February 1940	Author	Les Xipéhuz and The Death of the Earth
Walter Benjamin	Germany	15 July 1892	26 September 1940	Philosopher	The Work of Art in the Age of Mechanical Reproduction
E. F. Benson	United Kingdom	24 July 1867	29 February 1940	Writer, archeologist	Mapp and Lucia series: Queen Lucia, Miss Mapp
John Buchan	United Kingdom	26 August 1875	11 February 1940	Writer, politician	List of works by John Buchan
Pedro de Alcântara	Brazil	15 October 1875	29 January 1940		
Mikhail Bulgakov	Russia	15 May 1891	10 March 1940	Writer	Heart of a Dog
Jan F. E. Celliers	South Africa	12 January 1865	1 June 1940	Writer	Die Vlakte en ander gedigte
Louis Fles	Netherlands	19 October 1872	24 May 1940	Businessman, author	Hitler, hervormer of misdadiger?
Walter Hasenclever	Germany	8 July 1890	22 June 1940	Poet, playwright	The Son
Verner von Heidenstam	Sweden	6 July 1859	20 May 1940	Writer	Folkunga Trädet
John A. Hobson	United Kingdom	6 July 1858	1 April 1940	Economist	List of works by John A. Hobson
Paul Klee	Switzerland	18 December 1879	29 June 1940	Artist	Paul Klee Notebooks
Jan Kubelík	Czech Republic	5 July 1880	5 December 1940	Composer	
Selma Lagerlöf	Sweden	20 November 1858	16 March 1940	Writer, teacher	Gösta Berling's Saga
George Lansbury	United Kingdom	22 February 1859	20 May 1940	Politician, editor	What I Saw in Russia
Philip Francis Nowlan	United States	13 November 1888	1 February 1940	Author	Armageddon 2419 A.D.
Kazimierz Przerwa-Tetmajer	Poland	12 February 1865	18 January 1940	Writer	The End of the 19th Century, Hymn to Nirvana
Panuganti Lakshminarasimha Rao	India	2 November 1865	1 January 1940	Writer	Works
Silvestre Revueltas	Mexico	31 December 1899	5 October 1940	Composer	Homenaje a Federico García Lorca
Anton Hansen Tammsaare	Estonia	30 January 1878	1 March 1940	Writer	Truth and Justice,
Menno ter Braak	Netherlands	26 January 1902	14 May 1940	Writer	Het nationaal-socialisme als rancuneleer
Leon Trotsky	Russia	7 November 1879	21 August 1940	Marxist theorist	List of books by Leon Trotsky
Édouard Vuillard	France	11 November 1868	21 June 1940	Artist	The Seamstress

== Entered the public domain in countries with life + 50 years ==
In most countries of Africa and Asia, as well as Belarus, Bolivia, Canada, New Zealand, Egypt and Uruguay; a work enters the public domain 50 years after the creator's death.

Names	Country	Birth	Death	Occupation	Notable work
Chris van Abkoude	Netherlands	6 November 1880	2 January 1960	Writer, Novelist	Pietje Bell
Lady Cynthia Asquith	United Kingdom	27 September 1887	31 March 1960	Author and editor	This Mortal Coil
Eric Temple Bell	United Kingdom; United States	7 February 1883	21 December 1960	Mathematician and science fiction writer	
Albert Camus	France	7 November 1913	4 January 1960	Philosopher, author	The Stranger
Victor Rousseau Emanuel	United Kingdom	2 January 1879	6 April 1960	Author	
John Russell Fearn	United Kingdom	5 June 1908	18 September 1960	Author	
Elsie J. Oxenham	United Kingdom	25 November 1880	9 January 1960	Children's novelist	Abbey Series of books
Eden Phillpotts	United Kingdom	4 November 1862	29 December 1960	Author, poet and dramatist	The Farmer's Wife
Nevil Shute	United Kingdom	17 January 1899	12 January 1960	Aeronautical engineer, novelist	On the Beach
Victor Sjöström	Sweden	20 September 1879	3 January 1960	Film director, actor	The Phantom Carriage
Dadasaheb Torne	India	13 April 1890	19 January 1960	Film director	Shree Pundalik

== Entering the public domain in countries with life + 80 years ==
Spain (for creators that died before 1987), Colombia and Equatorial Guinea have a copyright term of life + 80 years. The list is sorted alphabetically and includes one notable work that entered the public domain on 1 January 2011 for each creator.

List of authors
Names	Country	Birth	Death	Occupation	Notable work
Thomas Bulch	Australia	30 December 1862	13 November 1930	Composer	Memories of England
Henry Creamer	United States	21 June 1879	14 October 1930	Composer, lyricist	
Charles Derennes	France	4 August 1882	27 April 1930	Author, essayist and poet	
Arthur Conan Doyle	United Kingdom	22 May 1859	7 July 1930	Author and physician	The Lost World, Sherlock Holmes

== Entering the public domain in the United States ==
In the United States, the copyright status of works extends for the life of the author or artists, plus 70 years. If the work is owned by a corporation, then the copyright extends 95 years.

Due to the passing of the Copyright Term Extension Act (Sonny Bono Copyright Term Extension Act) in 1998, works never registered or published before January 1, 1978, and whose authors died before 1941 entered the public domain in this jurisdiction on January 1, 2011. Other works would not enter the public domain here until 2019.

== Worldwide ==
Nina Paley donated her 2008 film Sita Sings the Blues through a CC0 copyright notice.

== See also ==
- 1960 in literature for deaths of writers
- Public Domain Day
- Creative Commons
