= Katja Herbers =

Dutch actress

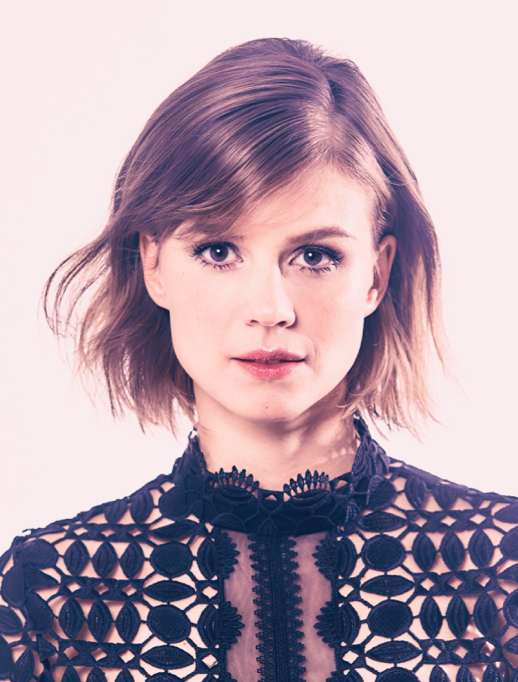
- Herbers in 2015
- Born: Katja Mira Herbers; 19 October 1980 (age 45); Amsterdam, North Holland, Netherlands
- Occupation: Actress
- Years active: 2002–present

Katja Mira Herbers (born 19 October 1980) is a Dutch actress. She is best known for portraying Dr. Helen Prins on the WGN America drama series Manhattan (2014–2015), Emily Grace in the HBO science fiction drama series Westworld (2018–2020), and Dr. Kristen Bouchard in the CBS/Paramount+ supernatural drama series Evil (2019–2024).

Herbers also featured in the FX spy thriller series The Americans (2015), the HBO mystery drama series The Leftovers (2017), and the Discovery Channel drama series Manhunt: Unabomber (2017).

== Early life and education ==
Katja Mira Herbers is the daughter of violinist Vera Beths (born 1946) and oboist and conductor Werner Herbers (1940–2023). Growing up she spent time in the US, accompanying her mother on tour with the group L'Archibudelli. Her mother remarried to cellist Anner Bylsma, and her father remarried to costume designer Leonie Polak, who introduced her to the theater. She had a Canadian au pair and learned to speak Dutch, German, and English growing up.

Herbers went to the Ignatius Gymnasium in Amsterdam. She studied psychology at the University of Amsterdam (1999–2000), during which time she also attended the local theatre school De Trap. She moved to New York and attended HB Studio. She then got accepted to the Academy of Theatre and Dance, which was previously named de Theater school, in Amsterdam (2001–2005).

== Career ==
During her studies, she starred in the films Peter Bell (2002) and Brush with Fate (2003). After graduation, Herbers became a member of theatre company NTGent, under the direction of Johan Simons in Ghent. She then joined the renowned Munich Kammerspiele in Germany. She worked with directors such as Alex van Warmerdam, Ivo van Hove and Theu Boermans under whose direction she performed many Schnitzler plays, including his monologue Fräulein Else, for which she received rave reviews. In 2013, she won the Guido de Moor Award for young talent, for her portrayal of Irina in Chekhov's Three Sisters. She played a lead role in Theu Boermans' De Uitverkorene (2006), which won an International Emmy and the prestigious Prix d'Europe.

She performed the piece Im wunderschönen Monat Mai, 21 songs after Schubert and Schumann, with pianist, conductor and composer Reinbert de Leeuw in 2013.

In February 2014, she won the role of physicist Helen Prins in WGN America's drama series Manhattan. Herbers starred as Evi Sneijder in season 3 of FX's The Americans.

In 2018, she joined the cast of the HBO science fiction drama series Westworld, starring as Emily Grace.

In fall 2019, Herbers began starring as Dr. Kristen Bouchard in the CBS supernatural drama series Evil.

== Filmography ==
=== Film ===
Year	Title	Role	Notes
2002	Peter Bell	Martha Bell	
2003	Kees de jongen	Rosa	
2003	Peter Bell II: The Hunt for the Czar Crown	Martha Bell	
2007	Timboektoe	Arlette	
2007	Trage liefde	Irma	
2009	Amsterdam	Roos	
2009	The Storm	Krina	
2010	Loft	Marjolein Hartman	
2011	Sonny Boy	Vera Bartels	
2011	Beautiful Life	Juffrouw Metz	
2012	Süskind	Fanny Philips	
2012	Brammetje Baas	Els Baas	
2013	Mannenharten	Nicole	
2014	De onderkoning: strijd om de grondwet	Hester van Hogendorp	
2014	Those Were the Days	Angela	
2014	The Pool	Jenny	
2015	My Last Respects	Eva	Short film
2015	Mannenharten II	Nicole	
2017	Weg van jou	Evi	
2020	The Columnist	Femke Boot	
2021	Upload	Psychiatrist	

=== Television ===
Year	Title	Role	Notes
2003	Brush with Fate	Tanneke	Television film
2004	Zinloos	Unknown	Television film
2004	Bijlmer Odyssee	Penny	Television film
2004	Baantjer	Nathalie van der Voort	Episode: "De Cock en de gemaskerde moord"
2004	De kroon	Kleindochter Karin	Television film
2005–2006	Lieve lust	Isabelle	12 episodes
2006	Spoorloos verdwenen	Chantal de Vries	Episode: "Het verdwenen adoptiekind"
2006	De uitverkorene	Marthe van der Laan	Television film
2007	Das Leben ein Traum	Rosaura	Television film
2009	S1ngle	Danii	Episode: "Gehandicaptendag"
2009–2012	De vloer op	Various	8 episodes
2011	Van God Los	Marije	Episode: "Wiet"
2012	Beatrix, Oranje onder Vuur	Maxima	4 episodes
2012–2016	Divorce	Joyce Waanders	44 episodes
2013	SOKO 5113	Franziska Hofer	Episode: "Der Tod des Marquis"
2014–2015	Manhattan	Helen Prins	23 episodes
2015	The Americans	Evi Sneijder	3 episodes
2015	De prijs van de waarheid	Isa	Television film
2017	The Leftovers	Dr. Eden	3 episodes
2017	Manhunt: Unabomber	Linda Patrik	4 episodes
2018	Suspects	Kathelijne Wetzels	Episode: "Missie Mali"
2018–2020	Westworld	Emily Grace	7 episodes
2019–2024	Evil	Kristen Bouchard	50 episodes Nominated—Critics' Choice Super Award for Best Actress in a Horror Series; Nominated—Critics' Choice Television Award for Best Actress in a Drama Series
2023	Mrs. Davis	Mathilde LaFleur	5 episodes

== Theatre ==
- 2013 – Im wunderschönen Monat Mai (Schubert, Schumann, Reinbert de Leeuw)
- 2013 – An Ideal Husband (Oscar Wilde, Theu Boermans, Nationale Toneel)
- 2013 – Platform (Houellebecq, Stephan Kimmig, Münchner Kammerspiele)
- 2012 – The Mother (Gorky, Alvis Hermanis, Münchner Kammerspiele)
- 2012 – Three Sisters (Chekhov, Theu Boermans, Nationale Toneel)
- 2011 – Winterreise (Schubert, Elfriede Jellinek, Johan Simons, Münchner Kammerspiele)
- 2010/2011 – Hotel Savoy (Joseph Roth, Johan Simons, Münchner Kammerspiele)
- 2010 – Fraulein Else (Schitzler, Theu Boermans, De Theatercompagnie)
- 2008/2009 – The Lonely Road (Schnitzler, Theu Boermans, De Theatercompagnie)
- 2007 – The Vast Domain (Schnitler, Theu Boermans, De Theatercompagnie)
- 2007/2008 and 2009 – Double Indemnity (Billy Wilder, Johan Simons, NTGent)
- 2006 – Life Is a Dream (Calderon, Johans Simons, NTGent)
- 2006 – Opening Night (Cassavetes, Ivo van Hove), NTGent/Toneelgroep Amsterdam/)
- 2006 – Edward II (Marlowe, Johan Simons, NTGent)
- 2004/2005 – The Terrible Mother (Alex van Warmerdam, De Mexicaanse hond)
