= Dick Matena =

Dutch comics writer and cartoonist (1943–2026)

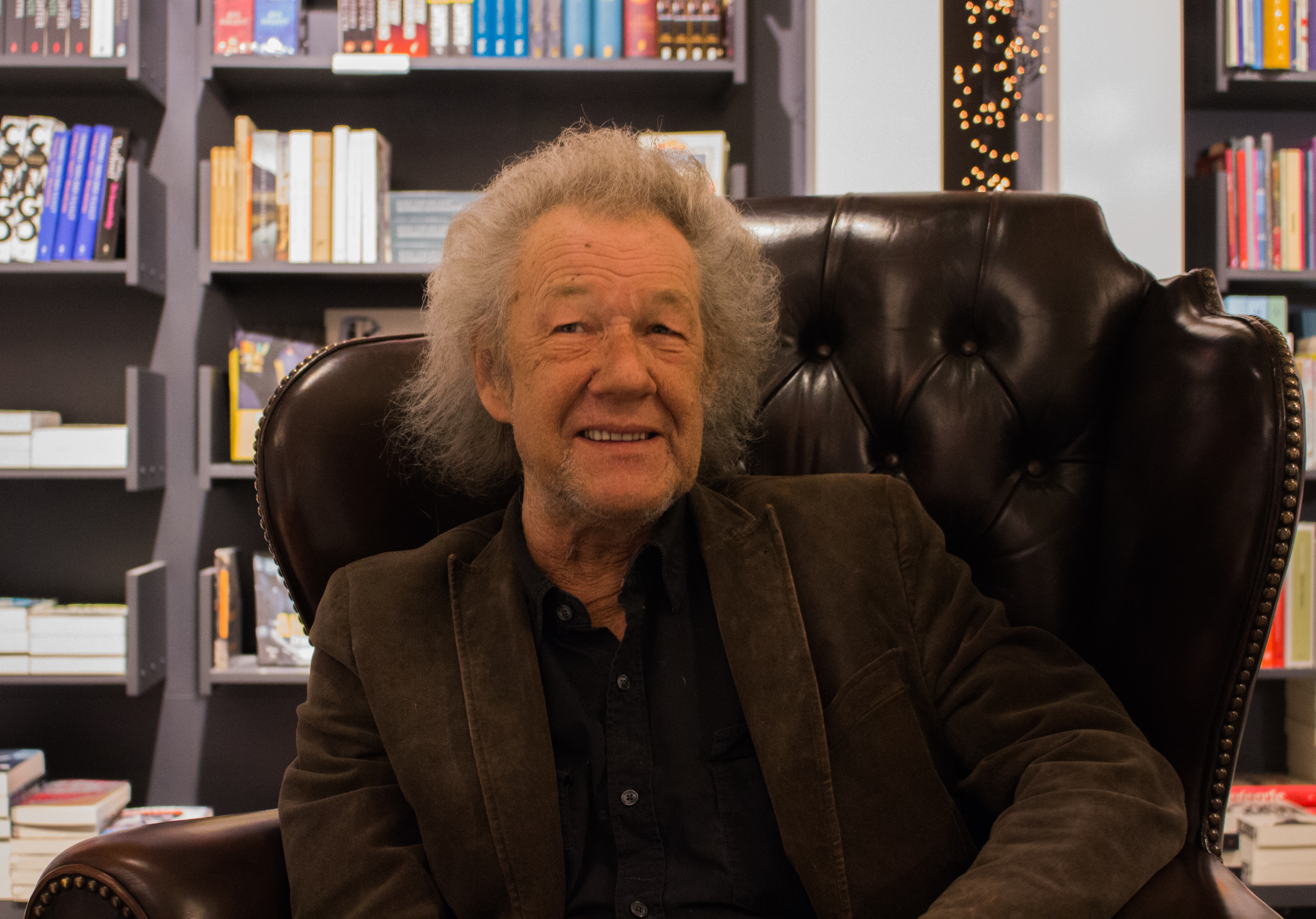
- Matena in 2014
- Born: 24 April 1943 The Hague, German-occupied Netherlands
- Died: 26 April 2026 (aged 83)
- Areas: Artist, writer
- Pseudonyms: A. den Dooier; John Kelly; Dick Richards
- Notable works: Storm, Tom Poes

Dick Matena (24 April 1943 – 26 April 2026) was a Dutch comics writer and cartoonist. He also published under the pseudonyms A. den Dooier, John Kelly and Dick Richards.

Matena made several kinds of comics, from humor comics to erotic comics, but was known for his comic-book adaptations of famous literary novels.

== Early life ==
Matena was born in The Hague on 24 April 1943.

== Career ==
=== Toonder studios ===
In 1960, at the age of 17, Matena started working as a volunteer at the Toonder studios. He helped with the drawing projects of Tom Puss (1962–1963) and Panda (1961–1968).

In 1968, his first own comic appeared in the comic magazine Pep.

=== Freelance period ===
In 1964, Matena started working as a freelancer, in the beginning mainly for the Toonder studios. He drew his own comic Polletje Pluim.

For Pep, he drew De Argonautjes (1968–1973) and Ridder Roodhart (1969–1971). He wrote scenarios for the Macaroni's (1971–1975) and Blook (1972–1973).

Matena later worked for the cartoon magazine Eppo, and wrote four scenarios for the comic series Storm (1978–1980). Under the pseudonym Dick Richards he wrote eight scenarios for the comic De Partners (1976–1984), drawn by Carry Brugman.

In 1977, Matena changed his drawing style and created his first realistic comic, Virl.

=== Foreign period ===
From 1982 until 1984, he lived in Spain and worked for the art agency Selecciones Ilustradas.

For the comic magazine Titanic, he created two starship stories.

After his move to Belgium, he created the comics De laatste dagen van Edgar Allan Poe, Gauguin en Van Gogh and Mozart & Casanova.

=== Spin-off of Storm and after ===
With stories by Martin Lodewijk, Matena drew three spin-off comics of Storm. The series of these Storm albums are called Kronieken van de Tussentijd. He used his pseudonym John Kelly at first; the last comic is published under his own name.

In 1997, he started again with the comic Tom Puss. Two stories were published in the Dutch version of the magazine Donald Duck.

=== Comics of Dutch literature ===
Matena drew comics of classical Dutch literary books. In 2003, he won the Bronzen Adhemar award. He was the first non-Flemish comics artist to receive this honor.

== Death ==
Matena died on 26 April 2026, two days after his 83rd birthday.

== Awards ==
- Stripschapsprijs for his complete comic work 1986
- Bronzen Adhemar for his comic work of the book De Avonden 2003

== Bibliography ==
=== De Argonautjes (with Lo Hartog van Banda) ===
1 – Het orakel van Delphi (1970)
2 – Het eerste avontuur van de Argonautjes (1976)
3 – De Olympische vlam / Het Labyrinth (1978)
4 – Het zwaard van Damocles (1978)
5 – De strijd om de ronde tafel / De kwelling van Tantalus (1979)
6 – De held van Sparta (1980)

=== Storm (with Don Lawrence) ===
The Chronicles of the Deep World

3 – The People of the Desert (Het Volk van de Woestijn) (1979)
4 – The Green Hell (De Groene Hel) (1980)
5 – The Battle for Earth (De Strijd om de Aarde) (1980)
6 – The Secret of the Nitron Rays (Het Geheim van de Nitronstralen) (1981)

Chronicles of Meanwhile

1 – The Voyager Virus (Het Voyager Virus) (1996)
2 – The Dallas Paradox (De Dallas Paradox) (1997)
3 – The Stargorger (De Sterrenvreter) (1998)
4 – Klein Space (De Ruimte van Klein) (unfinished and unpublished)

=== Starship (Sterrenschip) ===
1 – De jacht op het wezekind (1987)
2 – De verlosser (1988)

=== Virl ===
1 – Exile to Cion (Verbanning naar Cion) (1979)
2 – Quest for Terra (Speurtocht naar Terra) (1981)
3 – Het asiel (2014)

=== Alias Ego ===
1 – Vlucht uit de richel (1993)
2 – De valse goden (1995)

=== The Evenings (De Avonden) (Gerard Reve) ===
Part 1 (2003)
Part 2 (2003)
Part 3 (2004)
Part 4 (2004)

=== Crew Cut (Kort Amerikaans) (Jan Wolkers) ===
Part 1 (2006)
Part 2 (2007)

=== One shots ===
De Prediker (1984)
Little Crumb (based on Kruimeltje by Chris van Abkoude) (1988)
Pietje Bell (based on Pietje Bell by Chris van Abkoude)
Dik Trom (based on Dik Trom by Cornelis Johannes Kieviet)
Afke's Tiental (based on Afke's Tiental by Nienke van Hichtum)
The Last Days of E. A. Poe (De laatste dagen van E. A. Poe) (1988)
Gauguin and van Gogh (Gauguin en van Gogh) (1990)
Sartre & Hemingway (1992)
Het Hanzevirus
Mozart & Casanova
Judge Dee (based on Rechter Tie by Robert van Gulik) (2001)
A Christmas Carol (based on A Christmas Carol by Charles Dickens) (2004)
Cheese (based on Kaas by Willem Elsschot) (2008)
Will o' the Wisp (based on Het dwaallicht by Willem Elsschot) (2008)
The Comedian (based on De Komiek, a cabaret show by Freek de Jonge (2009)
Kees the Boy (based on Kees de Jongen by Theo Thijssen) (2011)
The Boy with the Knife (based on De Jongen Met Het Mes by Remco Campert) (2012)
Turkish Delight (based on Turks Fruit by Jan Wolkers (2016)

== Sources ==
- De Eppo-index
- Rob van Eyck (1979). Matena, Dick (ps. A. den Dooier, Dick Richard). In: Wordt Vervolgd: Striplexicon der Lage Landen (Evelien en Kees Kousemaker, eds.). Het Spectrum, Utrecht.
- Rob van Eyck (1987). Matena Dick. In: Kunst en Grafische Vernieuwing in het Europees Beeldverhaal. De Buck, Brussel.
