= Regret! =

2013 teen drama film

- Theatrical release poster
- Directed by: Dave Schram
- Written by: Maria Peters; Dick van den Heuvel
- Based on: Spijt! by Carry Slee
- Produced by: Dave Schram; Maria Peters; Hans Pols; Danielle Guirgus
- Starring: Robin Boissevain; Stefan Collie; Dorus Witte
- Cinematography: Erwin Steen
- Edited by: Robin de Jong
- Music by: Herman Witkam
- Production companies: Shooting Star Filmcompany; Katholieke Radio Omroep
- Distributed by: Dutch FilmWorks
- Release date: 20 June 2013
- Country: Netherlands
- Language: Dutch
- Box office: $4 million

Regret! (Dutch: Spijt!) is a 2013 teen drama film directed by Dave Schram, based on the 1997 book Spijt by Carry Slee.

It was released on 20 June 2013 by Dutch FilmWorks.

== Cast ==
- Robin Boissevain as David Smit
- Dorus Witte as Vera Teunisse
- Stefan Collier as Jochem Steenman
- Charlotte Bakker as Sanne, Jochem's main bully
- Nils Verkooijen as Justin van de Lek, Sanne's accomplice
- Rick van Elk as Remco van Dijk, Sanne's accomplice
- Brahim Fouradi as Youssef
- Dave Mantel as Tino van Dijk
- Jessica Zeylmaker as Mrs. Steenman
- Edo Brunner as Mr. Steenman
- Frans de Wit as Sanne's father

== Release ==
The film received positive reviews from critics.

=== Home media ===
The film was released on Blu-ray on 12 November 2013.
