= Amber Sealey =

American actress

Amber Sealey is a British-American actress, film producer, screenwriter, and film director.

== Early life ==
Sealey was born in Brighton, England and raised in Santa Fe, New Mexico. She attended the University of California, Santa Cruz and studied Theater and Modern Dance. She attended the acclaimed Royal Academy of Dramatic Art and the Central School of Speech and Drama.

In 1998 she moved to London where she worked with the acclaimed theatre collective, Shunt. In 2008 she moved to Los Angeles and began writing, directing, and producing her own feature films, which have screened in festivals internationally.

== Career ==
Sealey is known as an actor in the feature films The Good Night and Big Nothing, and the television series Attachments. She also voiced many audio books, including How I Live Now, Penny from Heaven, and the acclaimed The Princess Diaries.

Sealey has directed the feature film A Plus D, which was distributed by IndiePix Films and Seed & Spark, and premiered at the Montreal World Film Festival to rave reviews. The Montreal Gazette said, “Amber Sealey’s lacerating cinéma verité… the acting is fearless.. See this film!” and “Fact and fiction are obliterated… edgy, anguished, funny… The acting is astonishing… I thought of Cassavetes, Winterbottom…”.

Her second film, How to Cheat, which was distributed by FilmBuff, premiered at the Los Angeles Film Festival in 2011 to positive reviews. Huffington Post said it was, “Amazing… laugh-out-loud hilarious… I really can’t speak highly enough about this movie”. IndieWire said it was, “intriguing… defies expectations” and “Sealey manages to buck innumerable conventions, which makes her career worth tracking”.

In 2014 Sealey starred in the short film When You Were Mine directed by Michelle M. Witten and produced by Vanishing Angle playing the role of Anita and starring alongside Hugo Armstrong.

No Light and No Land Anywhere, Sealey's third feature, premiered at the 2016 Los Angeles Film Festival. IndieWire said, “No Light and No Land Anywhere has the potential to further cement Sealey’s reputation as one of the most promising directors of female-driven stories working the U.S. today.”

Sealey was selected for Film Independent's Directing Lab in 2013. Amber was also selected for Film Independent's Fast Track program in 2013 Sealey was selected to participate in Women In Film's 2017 Mentorship Program.

Sealey is an experienced acting coach who regularly works with directors and actors. She teaches a weekly Acting Class.

In 2024, she directed the Disney+ feature film Out of My Mind, starring Phoebe-Rae Taylor as a sixth grader with cerebral palsy. The film won a Peabody Award.

== Personal life ==
Sealey currently lives in Los Angeles with her husband, Ben Thoma, who works for NASA’s Jet Propulsion Lab, and their two children.
