= Peter Bell (film) =

2002 Dutch family comedy drama film directed by Maria Peters

Peter Bell: The Movie
- Theatrical release poster
- Directed by: Maria Peters
- Screenplay by: Maria Peters
- Based on: Pietje Bell by Chris van Abkoude
- Produced by: Dave Schram; Hans Pos
- Starring: Quinten Schram; Rick Engelkes; Katja Herbers; Stijn Westenend; Felix Strategier; Marjan Luif; Arjan Ederveen; Willem Nijholt; Angela Groothuizen; Roef Ragas; Frensch de Groot
- Cinematography: Hein Groot
- Edited by: Ot Louw
- Music by: Henny Vrienten
- Production companies: Shooting Star Filmcompany; Katholieke Radio Omroep; filmpool fiction
- Distributed by: Buena Vista International (Netherlands); Stardust Filmverleih (Germany)
- Release dates: 15 November 2002 (Tuschinski Theatre); 17 November 2002 (Netherlands); 19 January 2006 (Germany)
- Running time: 110 minutes
- Countries: Netherlands; Germany
- Language: Dutch
- Budget: €12 million
- Box office: $4.8 million

Peter Bell (Dutch: Pietje Bell), subtitled as Peter Bell: The Movie (Dutch: Pietje Bell: De Film) is a 2002 Dutch-language comedy drama film written and directed by Maria Peters and produced by Dave Schram and Hans Pos, based on the first five Pietje Bell books by Chris van Abkoude, starring Quinten Schram as Pietje Bell with supporting roles played by Rick Engelkes, Katja Herbers, Stijn Westenend, Felix Strategier, Marjan Luif, Arjan Ederveen, Willem Nijholt, Angela Groothuizen, Roef Ragas and Frensch de Groot.

The film was released in the Netherlands on 17 November 2002 by Buena Vista International. It received a Golden Film award (75,000 visitors) and a Platinum Film award (200,000 visitors) in 2002. A sequel, Peter Bell II: The Hunt for the Czar Crown, was released in 2003.

== Plot ==
In 1930 Rotterdam, Peter Bell (Pietje Bell) is a spirited ten-year-old whose pranks delight his friends and frustrate adults. After a string of incidents lands him on the front pages of a major city newspaper, Pietje bristles at exaggerated reports by journalist Paul Velinga and the paper’s powerful publisher, Stark. Determined to set the record straight and “do good” in his own way, Pietje forms a secret club with his friends Sproet, Kees, Engeltje, Peentje and Jaap: De Zwarte Hand (“The Black Hand”).

The youngsters’ escapades bring them into conflict with their strict neighbor and schoolmaster Jozef Geelman and his pharmacist father, while tensions at home rise between Pietje and his older sister Martha, who also teaches at his school. When Pietje and his friends stumble upon a den of thieves, events spiral and the authorities briefly suspect Pietje of wrongdoing. At the same time, Pietje tries to protect Sproet from his violent, unemployed father, Jan Lampe, drawing the Black Hand deeper into efforts to expose real criminals and help families in their neighborhood.

Amid citywide commotion and a Sinterklaas celebration, the truth about the thefts comes to light. Velinga revises his reporting, Pietje clears his name, and the community recognizes that the Black Hand’s stunts were meant to right small injustices. Pietje reconciles with his family and teachers, remaining a mischief-maker whose antics now have a purpose

== Cast ==
- Quinten Schram as Pietje Bell, a prankster and troublemaker who's good at heart.
- Frensch de Groot as Sproet, Pietje's best friend, who comes from a poor family.
- Serge Price as Kees, one of Pietje's friends and a member of "De Zwarte Hand".
- Jordy Mul as Engeltje, one of Pietje's friends and a member of "De Zwarte Hand".
- Sjoerd Metz as Peentje, one of Pietje's friends and a member of "De Zwarte Hand".
- Nicky Burgers as Jaap, one of Pietje's friends and a member of "De Zwarte Hand".
- Felix Strategier as Vader Bell, Pietje's father and a cobbler.
- Angela Groothuizen as Moeder Bell, Pietje's mother.
- Marjan Luif as Tante Cato, Pietje's aunt.
- Katja Herbers as Martha Bell, Pietje's older sister and school teacher.
- Rick Engelkes as Paul Velinga, a journalist for "Het Laatste Nieuws".
- Stijn Westenend as Jozef Geelman, Pietje's mean neighbour and school teacher.
- Arjan Ederveen as Drogist Geelman, a pharmacist and Jozef's father.
- Roef Ragas as Jan Lampe, Sproet's abusive and unemployed father.
- Jack Wouterse as Klok, a burglar.
- René van 't Hof as Teun, a burglar.
- Willem Nijholt as Stark, a rich newspaper magnate
- Herman Vinck as Eindredacteur van de krant
- Wilfried de Jong as Distributeur Van Dijk
- Joop Doderer as Oude Man #1
- Ger van der Grijn as Oude Man #2
- Jan Munter as Oude Man #3
- Bram van der Vlugt as Sinterklaas

== Production ==
Principal photography began around mid-February 2002. Shooting took place across various locations in the Netherlands, Belgium and Germany. Filming locations in Belgium included Ghent and Bruges. The dance scene between Paul Velinga and Martha Bell was shot in the Efteling.

== Release ==
=== Critical response ===
The film received mixed reviews from critics

=== Kijkwijzer rating controversy ===
In 2022, Kijkwijzer raised the film's rating from AL (all ages) to 12 following several complaints regarding its violence. Producer Dave Schram criticized the change and considered taking legal action against Kijkwijzer, stating that "the filmmakers, cast, and crew are suffering financial losses as a result of the decision". Schram felt that Kijkwijzer could've made a mistake and said "I can't imagine there's a single moment in the film that could offend anyone. It's such a sweet and enjoyable family film". It was later lowered from 12 to 9.

=== Home media ===
The film was released on DVD and VHS by Buena Vista Home Entertainment on 19 November 2003. The DVD release featured a commentary track from Maria Peters along with deleted scenes, bloopers, trailers, behind the scenes and a sneak preview of Peter Bell II: The Hunt for the Czar Crown. The DVD was later re-released in a two-pack with its sequel on 25 August 2004.

=== Accolades ===
Accolades received by Peter Bell
Year	Award	Category	Recipient(s)	Result	Ref.
2003	Netherlands Film Festival	Golden Calf for Best Production Design	Benedict Schillemans	Won	
