= Dave Schram =

Dutch film producer and director (born 1958)

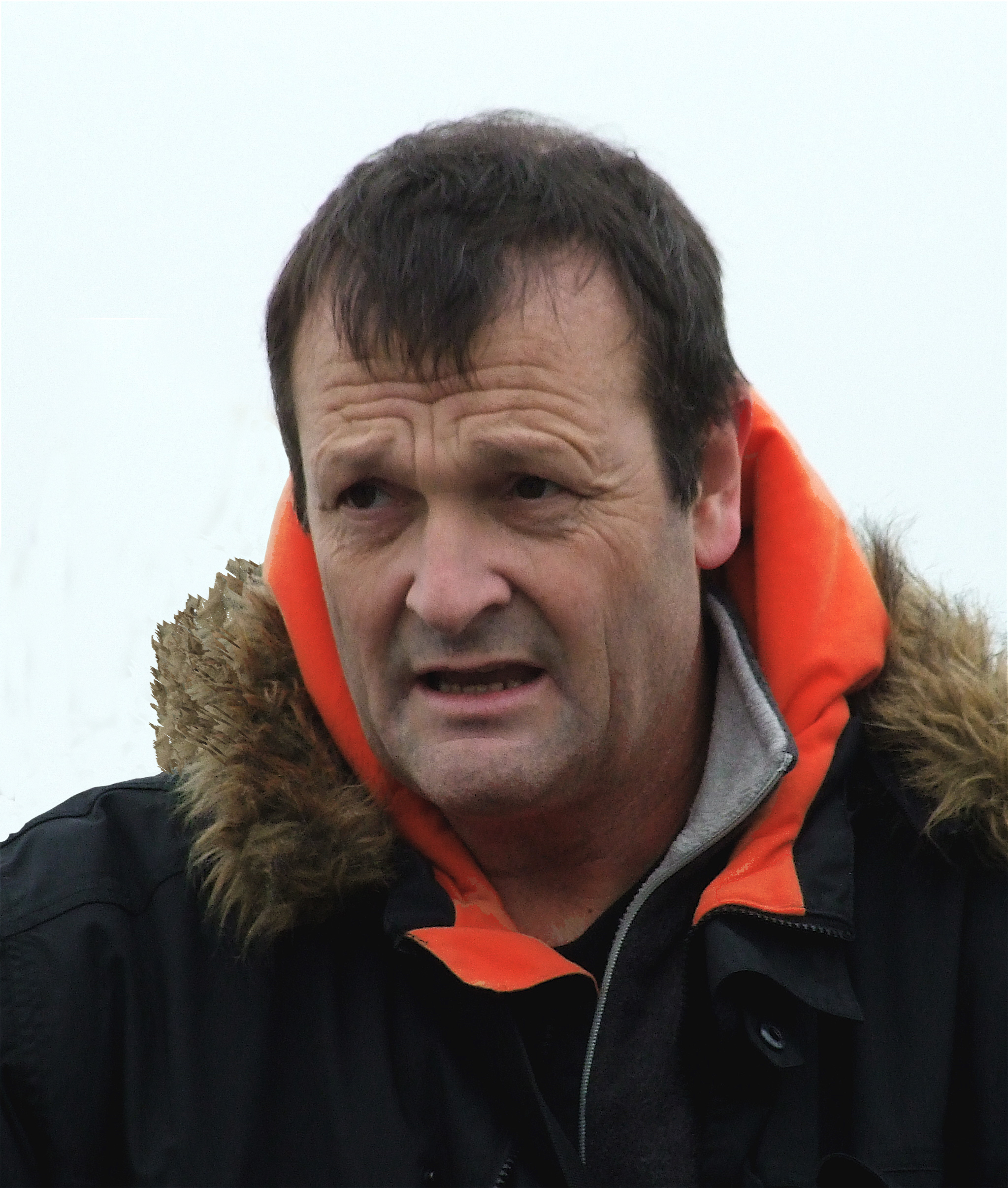
- Schram in 2010.
- Born: 23 August 1958 (age 67); Nieuwer-Amstel,
- Occupations: Film producer; director
- Years active: 1973–present
- Spouse: Maria Peters
- Children: 2, including Tessa Schram
- Website: shootingstar.nl

Dave Schram (born 23 August 1958) is a Dutch film producer and director.

== Biography ==
Schram has been working in the film industry since 1973. He first appeared in front of the camera as an actor in the NCRV youth series Orimoa and in Achter de horizon is nog een land, later behind the camera in various disciplines: lighting, sound, camera, production, and directing. He worked as an assistant on productions such as Sabine, Flodder, Een vlucht Regenwulpen, Bekende gezichten, gemengde gevoelens, A Time to Die, and Still Smokin.

In 1974, Schram founded his first production company, D.E. Filmproducties. Thanks to an interview in Het Parool, they were commissioned in 1976 to make their first 16mm film, a film about Formula 1 racing that also featured James Hunt and Riccardo Patrese.

In 1989, He, along with his wife Maria Peters and producer Hans Pos, founded the film production company Shooting Star Filmcompany and its distribution arm Shooting Star Filmdistribution.

in 2007, Dave made his directorial debut with Timboektoe, he followed it up with Desperate (2008), Lover or Loser (2009) and Regret! (2013).

In 2022, Dave Schram criticized and considered taking legal action against Kijkwijzer for changing the rating of his 2002 film Peter Bell from AL (all ages) to 12, stating that "the filmmakers, cast, and crew are suffering financial losses as a result of the decision". Schram also felt that Kijkwijzer could've made a mistake and said "I can't imagine there's a single moment in the film that could offend anyone. It's such a sweet and enjoyable family film".

== Personal life ==
He is married to film producer Maria Peters and is the father of actors Quinten and Tessa Schram.

== Filmography ==
=== As producer ===
- Daens (1993)
- The Purse Snatcher (1995)
- Left Luggage (1998)
- Little Crumb (1999)
- Baby Blue (2001)
- Peter Bell: The Movie (2002)
- Peter Bell II: The Hunt for the Czar Crown (2003)
- Keep Off (2006)
- Timboektoe (2007, also director)
- Captain Rob and the Secret of Professor Lupardi (2007)
- Desperate (2008, also director)
- Lover or Loser (2009, also director)
- Furious (2011, also director)
- Sonny Boy (2011)
- Mike says Goodbye! (2012)
- Regret! (2013, also director)
- Prey (2016)
- The Conductor (2018)
