= Brush with Fate =

2003 television film

- Film poster
- Genre: Drama
- Written by: Susan Vreeland; Richard Russo
- Directed by: Brent Shields
- Starring: Glenn Close; Ellen Burstyn; Thomas Gibson; Phyllida Law
- Country of origin: United States
- Original language: English

Production
- Producers: Cameron Johann; Thomas John Kane
- Cinematography: Eric Noman Van Haren
- Editor: Scott Vickrey
- Running time: 100 minutes

Original release
- Network: CBS
- Release: February 2, 2003

Brush with Fate is an American drama television film debuted on February 2, 2003, on CBS. It followed the life of an imaginary painting by Dutch painter Johannes Vermeer as it passes through the hands of various people. The film was based on Girl in Hyacinth Blue, the 1999 novel by author Susan Vreeland, and starred Glenn Close and Ellen Burstyn. The imaginary painting Girl in Hyacinth Blue, the principal object in this film, is painted exactly in Vermeer's painting technique by the American master painter Jonathan Janson, author and webmaster of the website about the life and work of Johannes Vermeer "Essential Vermeer".

== Plot ==
Richard is a new art teacher at a high school. Cornelia Englebrecht (played by Glenn Close) is a history teacher who invites Richard to see a painting of a young girl at a table, which she believes to be a genuine Vermeer, where she tells him stories, which are portrayed as flashbacks about the people who owned the painting in the past. All of the stories take place in the Netherlands, and the flashbacks happen mostly before the one preceding it. The first story, from the late 1800s, involved a romance and had flashbacks within flashbacks. Another story took place in the early 1700s when a baby was abandoned during a flood after a dike break. The painting accompanied the baby and was intended to be sold for the baby's expenses.

In the next story, a man left a university to take a job working with the machinery used for the dikes. He got interested in a servant girl who was punished by being put in stocks. It is revealed in this story where the baby came from.

The next story was very brief, and in it, a woman, who was unsuccessful in bidding for the painting at an auction, seemed to know more about the painting than the auctioneer. The next story revealed how Vermeer came to paint the girl's picture. Finally, Cornelia tells us how she came in possession of the painting.

Tagline: "A mystery hidden for generations. Now the truth will finally be revealed."

== Cast ==
- Ellen Burstyn – Rika
- Glenn Close – Cornelia Englebrecht
- Thomas Gibson – Richard
- Phyllida Law – Maria
- Kelly Macdonald – Aletta
- Ger Apeldoorn – Man in Black
- Patrick Bergin – Headmaster
- Kieran Bew – Adrian
- Daniël Boissevain – Sol
- Horace Cohen – Faculty Man
- Jenne Decleir – Young Laurens
- Katja Herbers – Tanneke
- Marcel Jonker – Willem
- Hugo Konings – Young Man
- Caro Lenssen – Joanna
- Roef Ragas – Stijn
- Thekla Reuten – Saskia
- Erik van Beekum – Angry dike worker
- Erwan van Buuren – Fritz
- Laurien Van den Broeck – Magdalena
- Carly Wijs – Faculty Woman
