= Kapitein Rob en het Geheim van Professor Lupardi =

2007 film

- Theatrical release poster
- Directed by: Hans Pos
- Written by: Simon de Waal; Hans Pos
- Based on: Kapitein Rob by Pieter J. Kuhn
- Produced by: Dave Schram; Maria Peters
- Starring: Thijs Römer; Katja Schuurman; Arjan Ederveen; Alex Klaasen
- Cinematography: Erwin Steen
- Edited by: Diederik Veelo
- Music by: Maarten Spruijt; Fred Vogels
- Production companies: Shooting Star Filmcompany; Screenpartners B.V. Katholieke Radio Omroep
- Distributed by: A-Film Distribution
- Release date: 28 November 2007
- Running time: 95 minutes
- Country: Netherlands
- Language: Dutch
- Budget: 1,4 million euro

Kapitein Rob en het Geheim van Professor Lupardi (English: Captain Rob and the Secret of Professor Lupardi) is a 2007 Dutch adventure film directed by Hans Pos, based on Evert Werkman and Pieter J. Kuhn's eponymous newspaper comic Kapitein Rob. De Waal and Hans Pos wrote the script in collaboration with their production companies Screenpartners B.V. and Shooting Star Filmcompany.

The film was released in the Netherlands on November 28. It received a Gouden Film award in 2007 and a MovieSquad Junior Award in 2008, but was otherwise neither a critical nor a commercial success. Critic Jan Pieter Ekker of De Volkskrant felt the story was comparable to "cardboard" and that its low budget showed too much.

== Plot ==
Captain Rob has to babysit Stijn and Sandra, the children of his sister Marga, when he hears that a cargo of gold has been stolen when the ship sailed through a mysterious mist. He receives the mission to investigate the matter immediately and takes the children with him. Along his journey he meets the weatherwoman Paula. They eventually discover that the evil professor Lupardi and his assistant Yoto have stolen the gold to make an ultra crystal which can change the weather...

== Cast ==
- Thijs Römer as Kapitein Rob
- Robert Ruigrok van der Werve as Stijn
- Emilie Pos as Sandra
- Katja Schuurman as Paula
- Arjan Ederveen as Professor Lupardi
- Alex Klaasen as Yoto
- Jack Wouterse as General
- Hans Dagelet as Cigaret Larry
- Ricky Koole as Marga
- Hans Kesting as Chief commandos
- Yannick de Waal as Sammie
- Marcel Roelfsma as Chief guard
- Stijn Westenend as Researcher
- Mike Reus as Scientist
- Kenneth Herdigein as Commander
- Richard Kemper as Oscar
- Jennifer Hoffman as Millionaire's daughter
- Wouter Bos as Prime Minister
- Joost Prinsen as Police inspector
- Marisa van Eyle as Tante Annie
