= The Columnist =

The Columnist may refer to:

- The Columnist (play), a play by David Auburn
- The Columnist (film), a 2019 Dutch black comedy thriller film

== See also ==
- Columnist, a person who writes for publication in a series
