= Last Stand at Saber River =

1997 TV film

- DVD cover
- Genre: Western
- Based on: Last Stand at Saber River by Elmore Leonard
- Written by: Ronald M. Cohen
- Directed by: Dick Lowry
- Starring: Tom Selleck; Suzy Amis; Rachel Duncan; Haley Joel Osment
- Music by: David Shire
- Country of origin: United States
- Original language: English

Production
- Executive producers: Michael Brandman; Tom Selleck
- Producers: Steven Brandman; Mary Ann Braubach; Thomas Kane
- Cinematography: Ric Waite
- Editor: William B. Stich
- Running time: 95 minutes
- Production companies: TWS Productions II; Turner Network Television

Original release
- Network: TNT
- Release: January 19, 1997

Last Stand at Saber River is a 1997 American Western television film directed by Dick Lowry and starring Tom Selleck, Suzy Amis, Haley Joel Osment, Keith Carradine, David Carradine, Tracey Needham, David Dukes, and Harry Carey Jr. Based on the 1959 novel of the same title by Elmore Leonard, the film is about a Civil War Confederate veteran who tries to put the pieces of his life back together, but finds himself fighting a new battle on the frontier. Seeking to reclaim his Arizona homestead from rebel pioneers who sympathize with the Union war effort, he joins forces with his Union adversary to make a last stand for the one thing worth fighting for, his family. In 1997, Osment won a YoungStar Award for Best Performance by a Young Actor in a Made For TV Movie. In 1998, the film received the Western Heritage Awards Bronze Wrangler for Television Feature Film.

== Plot ==
Near the end of the Civil War, Paul Cable returns home to Texas after being away from his family for years while fighting for the Confederacy. His wife, Martha, is a strong-willed frontier woman whose independence makes her a force in and of herself. She had been told that he was killed in action. Upon her husband's unexpected return, she once again devotes herself to being his wife, but resents him for having left her and their children behind to fight a war she did not care to understand.

Despite having loved each other since childhood and being married, Paul and Martha are now like strangers to each other, and the tension between them is evident. During his absence, their youngest daughter died from a fever, and Martha, having borne that without him, has developed a hatred for her husband. Her father, James Sanford, scolds her for her attitude toward Cable, but she stands her ground, never backing down from her stance on the subject. James knows her well and subsequently leaves the subject alone.

Cable decides he will return to Arizona and reclaim the ranch he owns there. The family members, consisting of Paul, Martha, their daughter Clare and son Davis, load up their belongings, bid farewell to James, and make their way to Arizona. While en route, they come into contact with Lorraine Kidston, the beautiful ramrod cowgirl daughter of rancher Duane Kidston. During the night, horses headed by her men accidentally stampede through the Cables' camp, leading Paul and Martha to scold the men. Lorraine agrees that her men were foolish to run the horses at night, and scolds them. Through this interaction, the cowhands and Lorraine learn that the man in front of them is, in fact, Paul Cable. They had been told that he was dead, and since then, her father has assumed control of Cable's ranch.

Duane is a former Union Army soldier, as is his brother Vern. They have little use for former Confederates and feel that Cable's ranch now belongs to them. Upon reaching the ranch, Cable confronts the Kidston men staying in his house. When two men attempt to draw on Cable, though, they are shot and killed by Martha, who is in the dark shadows, with a double-barreled shotgun.

The shooting leads to an ongoing feud between Cable and the Kidston men, during which several of Kidston's hired guns are killed by Cable. Vern and Lorraine, however, begin to sympathize with the Cables, feeling simply returning the ranch to them and letting things be would be better. Duane disagrees, but relents to his daughter and brother's wishes. In the end, the real threat to the Cables' new life in Arizona does not come from the Kidstons, but from a one-armed Confederate sympathizer and former soldier, Edward Janroe, who kills Duane, an event for which Cable is blamed.

Despite everything pointing to Cable as Duane's killer, not even Vern believes it. Janroe kidnaps Clare as security during an illegal gun transaction with Mexican bandits. Cable and Vern team up and chase down Janroe, killing him, then get involved in a shootout with the bandits. Cable eventually asks Vern to take Clare out of harm's way, which Vern does. Cable then takes on the remaining bandits alone, with them eventually just deciding to take the guns from Janroe's wrecked wagon and leave.

Cable returns home wounded, where he is nursed by Martha, who has finally learned to accept him as he is. She decides to forgive him, forget all the animosity between them, and love her husband again.

== Cast ==
- Tom Selleck as Paul Cable
- Suzy Amis as Martha Cable
- David Dukes as Edward Janroe
- Rachel Duncan as Clare Cable
- Haley Joel Osment as Davis Cable
- Keith Carradine as Vern Kidston
- David Carradine as Duane Kidston
- Tracey Needham as Lorraine Kidston
- Chris Stacy as Chris
- Harry Carey Jr. as James Sanford
- Patrick Kilpatrick as Austin Dodd
- Rex Linn as Bill Dancy
- Eugene Osment as Wynn Dodd
- Denis Forest as Cornet
- Lumi Cavazos as Luz
- Raymond Cruz as Manuel

== Production ==
=== Filming locations ===
- Bonanza Creek Ranch, 15 Bonanza Creek Lane, Santa Fe, New Mexico, USA
- Charles R Ranch, County Road 24, Las Vegas, New Mexico, USA
- Las Vegas, New Mexico, USA
- Santa Clara Pueblo, New Mexico, USA
- Valle Grande, New Mexico, USA

== Reception ==
=== Awards and nominations ===
- 1997 YoungStar Awards for Best Performance by a Young Actor in a Made For TV Movie (Haley Joel Osment)
- 1998 Western Heritage Awards Bronze Wrangler for Television Feature Film
