= Tessa Schram =

Dutch actress and director (born 1988)

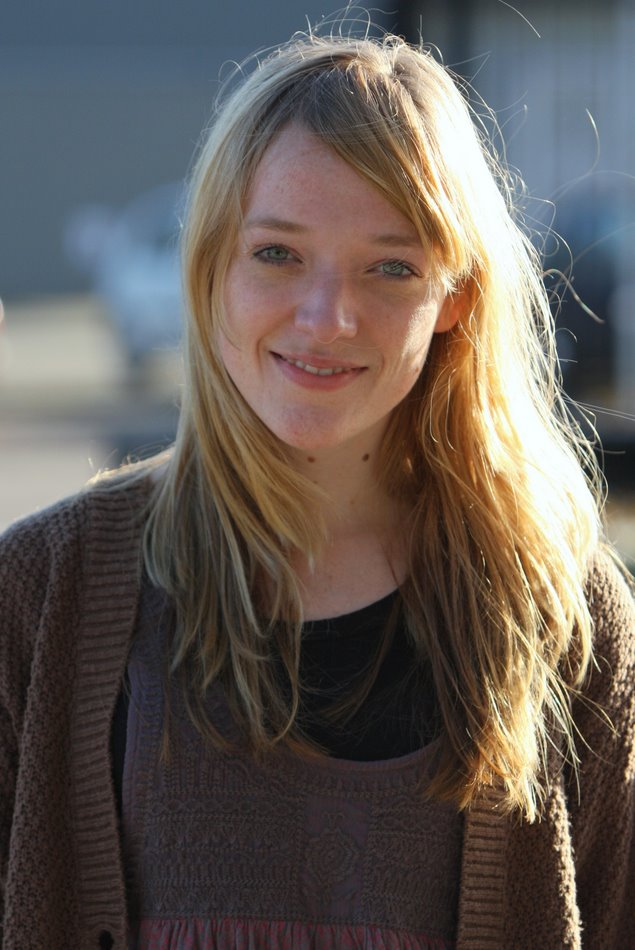
- Born: 18 October 1988 (age 37); Amstelveen, Netherlands
- Occupations: Actress, director
- Years active: 1998–present
- Parent(s): Dave Schram; Maria Peters
- Relatives: Quinten Schram (brother)
- Website: tessaschram.com

Tessa Schram (born 18 October 1988) is a Dutch actress and director. She is the daughter of film producer and director Dave Schram and Maria Peters and the sister of actor Quinten Schram.

== Filmography ==
=== Films ===
==== As director ====
- Sammie is Looking (2011)
- Lost and Found (2012)
- Painkillers (2014)
- Kappen (2016)
- 100% Coco (2017)

==== As assistant director ====
- Guilty Movie (2012)
- Graffiti Detective (2013)
- Raaf (2015)

==== As writer ====
- Painkillers (2014)

==== As actress ====
- Een echte hond (1998) as Tessa
- Little Crumb (1999) as a child mother of Keesie
- Peter Bell II: The Hunt for the Czar Crown (2003) as Marie
- Keep Off (2006) as Fleur

==== Miscellaneous ====
- Radeloos (2008)
- Bukowski (2010)
- Arigato (2012)
- Regret! (2013)
- Kroost (2014)

=== Television series ===
==== As director ====
- Dagboek van een callgirl (2015)
- SpangaS (2016)

==== As script writer ====
- Marathon Girl (2008)

==== As actress ====
- Grijpstra & de Gier: Lekkere jongens (2006) as Nancy
- Spoorloos verdwenen: De verdwenen leraar (2007) as Eline Buisel

==== Miscellaneous ====
- Marathon Girl (2008)

== On the cover ==
Maren Stoffels wrote her fourth book Freckles Love with Tessa on the cover, released in 2007.
