= IHostage =

iHostage
- Directed by: Bobby Boermans
- Written by: Simon de Waal
- Based on: The Apple Store Amsterdam hostage crisis
- Produced by: Caviar Films, Horizon Film Amsterdam
- Starring: Soufiane Moussouli; Admir Šehović; Loes Haverkort; Marcel Hensema; Emmanuel Ohene Boafo; Matteo van der Grijn; Fockeline Ouwerkerk
- Distributed by: Netflix
- Release date: April 18, 2025 (Netherlands)
- Running time: 100 minutes
- Country: Netherlands
- Languages: Dutch; Bulgarian; English

iHostage is a 2025 Dutch thriller film directed by Bobby Boermans and written by Simon de Waal. Released on April 18, 2025, on Netflix, the film is inspired by the real-life hostage crisis Apple Store Amsterdam that occurred at an Apple Store in Amsterdam on February 22, 2022. The movie stars Soufiane Moussouli as the gunman, Admir Šehović as the main hostage, and features a supporting cast including Loes Haverkort, Marcel Hensema, and Emmanuel Ohene Boafo. The narrative unfolds through the perspectives of the attacker, the hostages, and the police, blending suspense with emotional depth to depict a tense standoff.

== Plot ==
The film centers on a gunman, portrayed as Ammar Ajar (a fictionalized version of the real assailant), who enters an Apple Store in Amsterdam's bustling Leidseplein square, demanding over $200 million in cryptocurrency and safe passage out of the city. He takes Ilian Petrov, a Bulgarian visitor (inspired by the real hostage whose identity remains undisclosed), as his primary hostage. While most customers escape, four others hide in a supply closet, and the police engage in a five-hour negotiation. The crisis escalates when the hostage flees during a water delivery, leading to the gunman's dramatic takedown by a police vehicle, mirroring the controversial real-life resolution.

== Production ==
Directed by Bobby Boermans, known for The Golden Hour, and written by de Waal, a detective with access to insider accounts, iHostage was produced by Caviar Films and Horizon Film Amsterdam. Boermans, living near the incident site, was struck by the "surreal calm after the storm", and aimed to capture the human resilience amid chaos. The filmmakers consulted police, Apple Store employees, and hostages to ensure authenticity, though they used fictional names to protect privacy. Filming took place in Amsterdam, with a runtime of 1 hour and 40 minutes, presented in Dutch with English subtitles.

== Cast ==
- Soufiane Moussouli as Ammar Ajar
- Admir Šehović as Ilian Petrov
- Loes Haverkort as Lynn
- Marcel Hensema as Kees
- Emmanuel Ohene Boafo as Mingus
- Matteo van der Grijn as Abe
- Fockeline Ouwerkerk as Soof

== Release and reception ==
iHostage premiered on Netflix on April 18, 2025, quickly climbing to the No. 1 spot on the platform’s U.S. top 10 list. Reviews have been mixed. Critics on Rotten Tomatoes note strong performances but criticize the lack of emotional depth and character development, with a consensus that it’s a "watchable but unremarkable thriller." The film's depiction of the police's unconventional ending—running down the gunman—has sparked debate, reflecting the real-life controversy in the Netherlands.

== Viewership ==
According to data from Showlabs, iHostage ranked eighth on Netflix in the United States during the week of 14–20 April 2025.

== Historical context ==
The film draws from the February 22, 2022, incident where 27-year-old Abdel Rahman Akkad took a 44-year-old Bulgarian man hostage, demanding €200 million in cryptocurrency. After firing shots and trapping others, the standoff ended when the hostage escaped, and police struck Akkad with a vehicle, leading to his death. The event, rare in the Netherlands, prompted public discourse on mental health and police tactics, themes Boermans hoped to explore through the film.
