= Simon de Waal =

Dutch writer

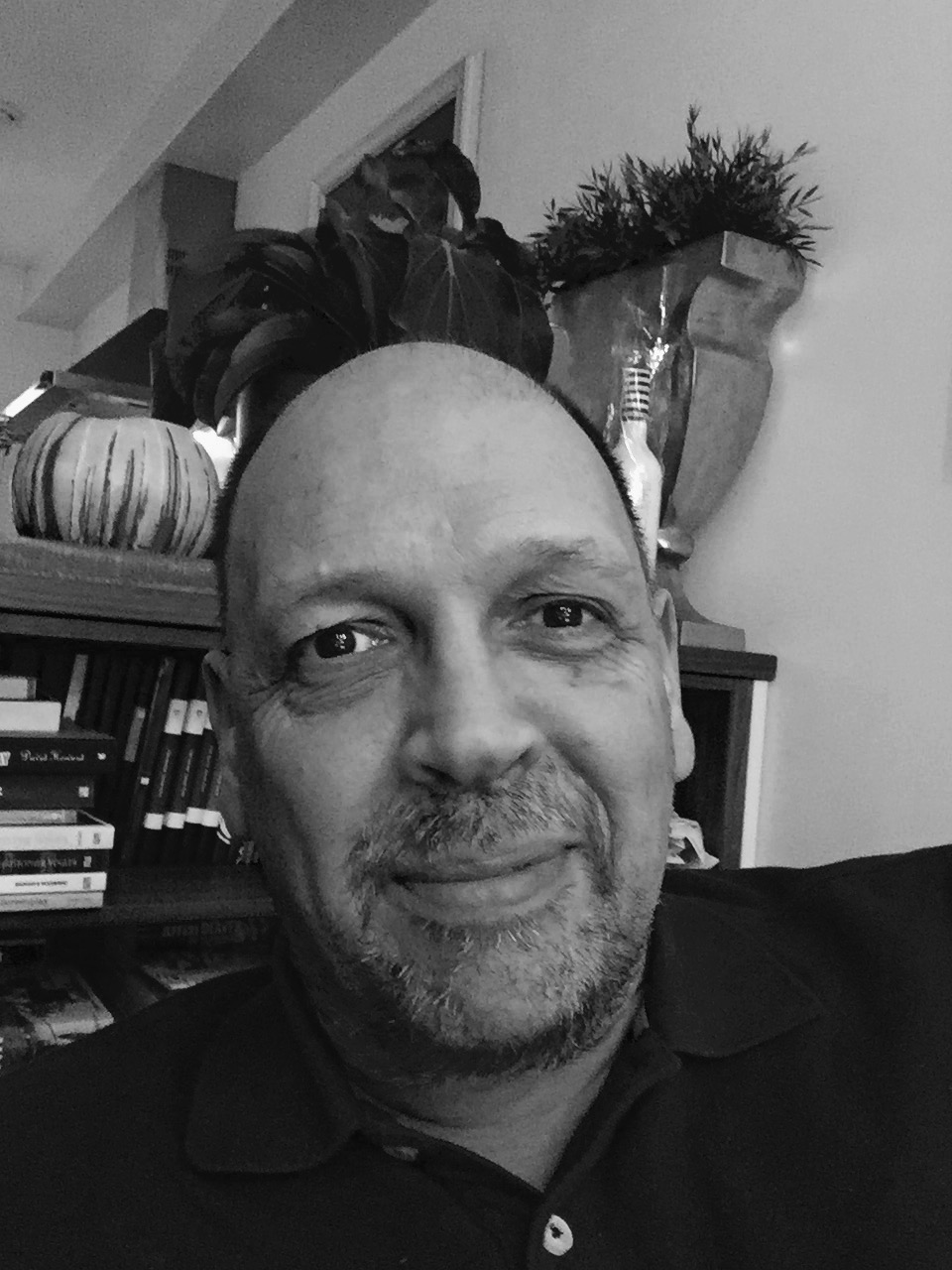
- Born: 1961 (age 64–65); Amsterdam, Netherlands
- Occupations: Writer, screenwriter, homicide detective
- Writing career
- Genres: Thriller, crime fiction
- Notable awards: Golden Calf (2000); Diamond Bullet (2007); Rockie Award (2023)

Simon de Waal (born in Amsterdam in 1961) is a Dutch writer.

He has specialized in television and film scripts, he won the Golden Calf in 2000 (grand prize for the Netherlands Film), for best screenplay for the film Leak. Leak also won best film, best director and best actor, and several international awards, making it one of the most successful Dutch films. Several of the series he wrote, were either nominated or awarded with prizes for best television series in the Netherlands, for instance Unit 13, Bureau Kruislaan and Baantjer. Baantjer won the 'Golden Televizier-Ring' for best series, after being nominated for it twice.

His book Cop vs Killer was nominated for best thriller in 2005, in the Netherlands as well as in Belgium. He still works - part-time, due to his success as a writer - as a homicide detective in Amsterdam, since 1986. At the age of 18, in 1979, he started working as a police officer in Amsterdam. He has contributed to almost every police-series in the Netherlands.

In 2005, he collaborated with Lynda La Plante, creator of Prime Suspect and The Commander, and co-wrote a 2x90 minutes episode for The Commander (ITV, 2005) called "Blacklight".

His thriller Pentito was published November 2007. It is based on a true story, about an Italian mafia informant in the Netherlands, who was forced to give information to law enforcement in order to survive. Pentito was nominated in Belgium and The Netherlands as Best Thriller 2007, and won the award (Diamond Bullet) in Belgium.

In 2003, he started his own production company Screenpartners, that up to now co-produced the police TV series Boks (on TV in 2006), the film Kapitein Rob en het Geheim van professor Lupardi (in theatres November 29, 2007) and the film Cop vs Killer, which he also directed.

In 2008, he wrote a book with bestselling author Appie Baantjer, as Baantjer en De Waal. It was very successful, selling over 60,000 copies in the Netherlands alone. The series continued with 12 books, from which the first two books were credited as Baantjer & de Waal, and the ten books thereafter were credited De Waal & Baantjer. This was done at Appie Baantjer's request, who said: "I'm already famous, now you deserve your name to come first".

The bookseries "De Waal & Baantjer" was made into a successful tv-series named "Bureau Raampoort", the name of the police-station featured in the books.

After Pentito, Simon de Waal wrote the thrillers Nemesis and Systema. Both books were received very well, and got very good reviews.

In 2012, he wrote the script for Cop vs Killer, based on his first book. The script was made into a film, which was supposed to be directed by Hans Pos, but Pos fell sick on the 3rd day of shooting. Producer Shooting Star asked De Waal to direct the film from then on, which he did. He finished the film in 2012, and lead actor Jeroen Willems won a Golden Calf for best actor at the Netherlands Film Festival.

In cooperation with production company Shooting Star Filmcompany, De Waal and his production company Screenpartners are developing a new TV series and a feature film called Famous Last Words, and a film called The Fear of God.

In 2014, he was showrunner of the successful SBS tv-series Bureau Raampoort that he created, which was based on his best-selling book-series by the same name.

In 2022, it was announced that his book Nemesis would be the basis of the first original Dutch Disney+ series. Nemesis released on the Disney+ platform on October 16, 2024 to a mixed critical review. In that same year, he signed an exclusive three year first-look-deal with Dutch streamer Videoland.

In 2022, two television series De Waal created and wrote aired: the six-part action thriller The Golden Hour (NPO) and the six-part police drama Sleepers (Videoland, co-written with Robert de Hoog). The Golden Hour won the 2023 Rockie Award for Best Non-English Language Drama Series. Following its release on Netflix, the series entered the platform's global non-English TV Top 10.

In 2025, De Waal wrote the Netflix thriller film iHostage, based on the 2022 Apple Store hostage crisis in Amsterdam. According to Netflix's engagement report for the first half of 2025, the film recorded 57 million views worldwide.
