= Turks Fruit (novel) =

1969 novel by John Wolkers

Turks Fruit is a Dutch novel written by Jan Wolkers in 1969. Wolkers based the character Olga on his second wife Annemarie Nauta, his third wife Karina Gnirrep and photographer and poet Ida Sipora. In 2017, Sam Garrett published an English translation of the novel titled Turkish Delight.

== Plot summary ==
Turks Fruit begins with the unnamed lead character, a sculptor, lying on his bed and thinking about Olga, who has left him. He first met her when he was hitchhiking and she picked him up and succumbed to his charms. When they started driving again, they were in a non-lethal car crash. Two months later they met again and married.

The sculptor describes her father and mother. Her father was a fat, funny man. He repeats the same jokes time after time. Her mother is her father's complete opposite. The sculptor hates her, and she hates him. She wants to destroy the relationship between him and Olga. She is the reason Olga's father died. He was on a diet, but she secretly fed him fat. The sculptor saw her doing it and considers it to be murder. He never tells Olga or her father. Olga's mother also cheats and the father knows it, but doesn't mind. One of the mother's breasts was amputated because she had breast cancer.

After the sculptor describes Olga's parents, he describes his sexual relations with her, which was very important. During a dinner, the sculptor witnesses Olga flirting with someone her parents know. She goes to the bathroom with him, where he hits her. She leaves him and returns to her mother. After she leaves, the sculptor has short relationships with other women, but none as good as Olga. Olga has several relationships and marriages after the sculptor, but none equal the first.

Olga discovers she has an inoperable brain tumor and tells the sculptor. He visits her in the hospital nearly every day for six months, until she dies. She slowly loses her hair and the sculptor buys her a red wig. She is afraid that her teeth will fall out, so she only eats Turkish delight, explaining the title. Olga dies on an early spring evening. She is cremated while wearing her wig.

== Adaptations ==
- In 1973 Turks Fruit was turned into an award-winning film, Turkish Delight, directed by Paul Verhoeven. Rutger Hauer stars as the sculptor, and Monique van de Ven as Olga.
- In 2005 the musical adaptation of Turks Fruit called Turks Fruit the Rockmusical hit theatres. It was written by Dick van den Heuvel, in collaboration with Wolkers.
- In 2016 Dick Matena published a comic book adaptation of the novel, made in text comics format.
