= Leak (film) =

2000 film

- Theatrical release poster
- Directed by: Jean van de Velde
- Written by: Jean van de Velde; Simon de Waal
- Based on: Sans rancune by Peter van Gestel
- Produced by: Rolf Koot; Jean van de Velde
- Starring: Cas Jansen; Ricky Koole; Thomas Acda; Victor Löw; Gijs Scholten van Aschat
- Cinematography: Jules van den Steenhoven
- Edited by: Herman P. Koerts
- Music by: Fons Merkies
- Production company: All Yours Film
- Distributed by: C-Films
- Release date: 27 April 2000
- Running time: 105 minutes
- Country: Netherlands
- Language: Dutch

Leak (Dutch: Lek) is a 2000 Dutch thriller film written and directed by Jean van de Velde. The film was loosely based on the book Sans Racune by ex-police officer Jan van Daalen and on a real-life Dutch police scandal from 1994.

== Plot ==
Young police office Eddy is requested to turn his childhood friend Jack into a drugs informant.

== Cast ==
- Cas Jansen as Eddy Dolstra
- Ricky Koole as Ria de Boer
- Thomas Acda as Franco
- Victor Löw as Sjakie Boon/Jack
- Gijs Scholten van Aschat as Ferdinand de Wit
- Ton Kas as Ben Haverman
- Jacob Derwig as Patrick
- Willem de Wolf as Murph
- Daniël Boissevain as Wout
- Jacqueline Blom as Gynaecologist
- Angelique de Bruijnne as Jack's wife
- Jack Monkau as Bijl
- Saskia Temmink as Bijl's wife

== Awards ==
- Golden Calf for:
  - Best Feature Film
  - Best Director : Jean van de Velde
  - Best Actor : Victor Löw
  - Best Script : Jean van de Velde & Simon de Waal
