= Dave Mantel =

Dutch actor (1981–2018)

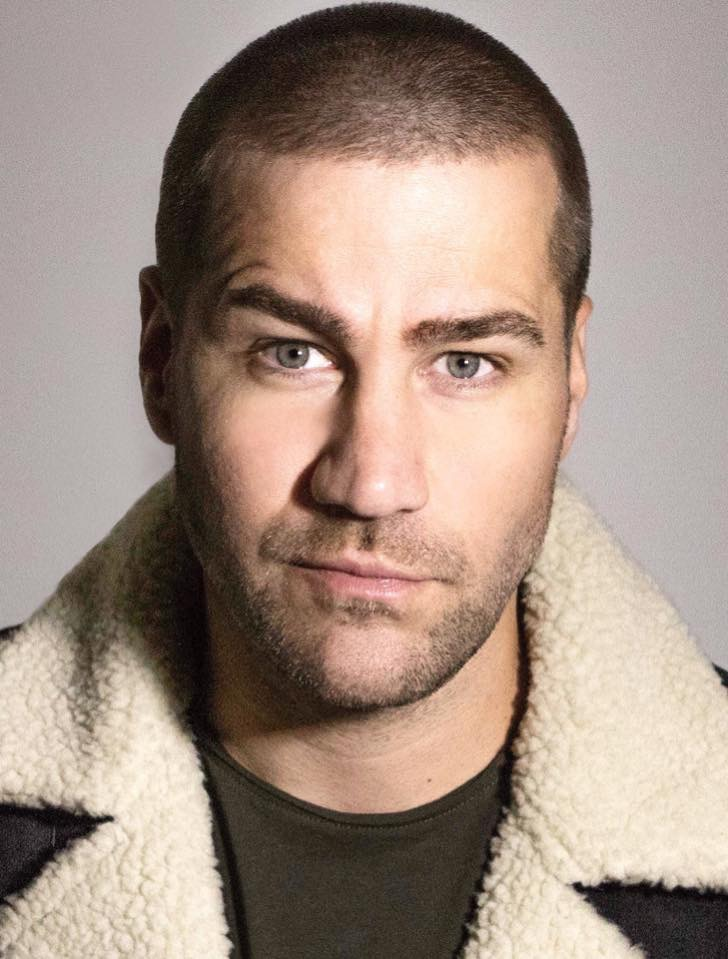
- Born: David John Mantel; 15 September 1981; Amsterdam, Netherlands
- Died: 1 December 2018 (aged 37)
- Occupation: Actor

David John Mantel (15 September 1981 – 1 December 2018) was a Dutch actor, film producer, and model.

== Biography ==
Mantel appeared in the soap opera Les bons moments, les mauvais moments from 2013–14, playing the character Menno Kuiper. Additionally, he acted in the movies Les salutations de Mike and in the internationally recognized Regret!. He also played Frank Farmer in the musical The Bodyguard. In addition to acting, Mantel was also a photographer and filmmaker. He was an ambassador for the Free A Girl movement, starting in 2015. Mantel died of natural causes on 1 December 2018 in Amsterdam.

== Filmography ==
=== Film ===
Year	Title	Role	Notes
2004	Gebroken rood (Broken Red)	Skinhead 1	TV movie
2006	Body Image	Sam	Short film
2009
2009	Het leven uit een dag	Barman Dancing	
2010	Majesteit (Majesty)	Constantijn	
2010	Het geheim (The Magicians)	Journalist #1	
2010	Homerun	Steven	Short film
2011	De Heineken ontvoering (The Heineken Kidnapping)	Policeman	
2011	The Passion	Disciple	TV movie
2011	Sonny Boy	Knokploegman	
2012	Süskind	Frits Groenteman	
2012	Quiz	Policeman	
2012	De Groeten van Mike! (Mike Says Goodbye!)	Willem	
2012	Magistratus: Overtura	Remco	
2012	Naar het Einde van de Straat	Ramenlapper	Short film
2013	Spijt! (Regret!)	Tino	
2013	Mannenharten	Fotograaf	
2013	Met Excuses voor het Ongemak	Johannes De Zakenman	Short film
2014	De Overgave (The Surrender)	John	
2016	Hoe het zo kwam dat de Ramenlapper Hoogtevrees Kreeg	Benedenbuurman Ben	
2016	The Passion	Good Prisoner	TV movie
	Kill Mode	David Oscar	post-production

=== Television ===
Year	Title	Role	Notes
2009-10	Onderweg naar morgen	Pieter van Velzen	13 episodes
2011	Generatie Nooitgenoeg	Model	Documentary
2012	Divorce	Collega Sophie	Episode: #1.1
2012-13	Dokter Tinus	Dennis Koopaert	2 episodes
2013-14	Goede tijden, slechte tijden	Menno Kuiper	143 episodes
2014-18	VIPS TV: Reportages	Himself	2 episodes
2014	Ik hou van Holland	Himself	Episode: Aflevering 1
2018	De spa	Eldin	2 episodes
2018	Het beste van GTST Classics	Himself/Menno Kuiper	Episode: "Het eerste homo-huwelijk van Lucas Sanders en Menno Kuiper uit 2014"
