= The Purse Snatcher =

1995 film

- Theatrical release poster
- Directed by: Maria Peters
- Screenplay by: Maria Peters
- Based on: De Tasjesdief by Mieke van Hooft
- Produced by: Dave Schram; Hans Pos; Maria Peters
- Starring: Olivier Tuinier
- Cinematography: Hein Groot
- Edited by: Ot Louw
- Music by: Ad van Dijk
- Production company: Shooting Star Filmcompany
- Distributed by: Shooting Star Filmdistribution
- Release date: 1995
- Running time: 96 minutes
- Country: Netherlands
- Language: Dutch
- Box office: $0.1 million (Netherlands)

The Purse Snatcher (Dutch: De Tasjesdief) is a 1995 Dutch film directed by Maria Peters, based on the book by Mieke van Hooft.

== Cast ==
- Olivier Tuinier as Alex van Zuilen
- Aus Greidanus Jr. as Lucas
- Micha Hulshof as Evert
- Myranda Jongeling as Alex' mother
- Jaap Spijkers as Alex' father
- Ingeborg Uyt den Boogaard as Roos
- Freark Smink as Stiefvader Ronnie
- Renée Fokker as Moeder Evert en Lucas
- Sophie van Pelt as Evelien
- Flip van Duyn as Vader Evelien
- Sheila Lever as Moeder Evelien
- Ann Hasekamp as Blinde Vrouw
- Cees Groot as Leraar
- Marjan Luif as Buurvrouw Roos
- Rob van de Meeberg as Huisarts
