= Roef Ragas =

Dutch actor (1965–2007)

- Born: Rudolphus Henricus Cornelis Ragas; 25 May 1965; Harderwijk, Netherlands
- Died: 30 August 2007 (aged 42); Amsterdam, Netherlands
- Occupation: Actor
- Years active: 1990-2007
- Spouse: Susan Visser (m. 1990)
- Children: 2
- Relatives: Bastiaan Ragas (brother)

Rudolphus Henricus Cornelis "Roef" Ragas (25 May 1965 – 30 August 2007) was a Dutch actor from Harderwijk. He was the older brother of Bastiaan and Jeroen Ragas.

From 1984 to 1990 Ragas studied Dutch at the University of Amsterdam. He graduated on the phenomenon of "time" in "De zondvloed" by Jeroen Brouwers. Then he went to the Amsterdam Theatre School, where he graduated in 1994.

He was a founding member of the Association of New Film and Television Makers, NFTVM, and sat on the board of the Dutch Association of Film and Television Makers, NBF, and the Dutch Film Festival.

Ragas had a relationship since 1990 and was married to actress Susan Visser. Together they had two children. On 30 August 2007 Ragas died of sudden cardiac arrest at the age of 42, during a visit to Harkema restaurant. On Thursday 6 September 2007 he was buried in Zorgvlied Cemetery.

== Filmography ==
- Een Turk uit Italië (1992) - Paul
- Richting Engeland (1993) -
- Bureau Kruislaan TV series - Eddie Nagel (Afl., De harmonie van het toeval, 1993)
- Hartverscheurend (1993) - Maarten
- Toen Kooymans met vakantie was (Televisiefilm, 1994) - Frank
- Pleidooi TV series- Te Riele, crimineel (Afl., Oslo, 1994)
- Flodder TV series- Politieagent Jan (Afl., Kees verliefd, 1994)
- Tralievader (Televisiefilm, 1995) - TV-monteur
- De buurtsuper TV series - Don (Afl. alle, vast karakter, 1995)
- Coverstory TV series - Michel (Episode 2.7, 1995)
- Voor hete vuren TV series - Rol onbekend (Afl., Bakboordbrand, 1995)
- De schaduwlopers (1995) - Jaloerse man
- Mykosh (1995) - Pieter van de Berg
- JuJu (1996) - Alex
- Red Rain (1996) - Tony
- Westzijde Posse TV series - Esteban (Afl. onbekend, 1996)
- Goede daden bij daglicht: Site by Site (Televisiefilm, 1996) - Zwitser
- Mijn moeder heeft ook een pistool (1996) - Kaj
- Breaking the Waves (1996) - Pim
- De Nieuwe Moeder (1996) - Vrachtwagenchauffeur
- Baantjer TV series - Badjar (Afl., De Cock en de moord op de vader, 1996)
- De zeemeerman (1996) - Uitsmijter
- Gitanes (1997) - Jean
- Windkracht 10 TV series- Harry (Afl., Vriend in nood, 1997)
- Rondootje (1997) - Ricardo
- 12 steden, 13 ongelukken TV series- Rocky (Afl., Poldergeest (Westerwolde), 1997)
- De fiets (1997) - Fietsenmaker
- Arends (TV movie, 1997) - Hans, collega
- All Stars (1997) - Vriend Sas
- De verstekeling (1997) - Collega zeeman
- I See You (1998) - Denis
- Celluloid blues (1998) - John
- Unit 13 TV series- Bram Teeuwen (Afl., Afscheid, 1998)
- Ivoren wachters (1998) - Frits Schotel de Bie
- Blindganger (1998), TV movie - Cafébezoeker
- De Poolse bruid (1998) - Zoon
- Combat TV series- Van den Bergh (Afl., Verdacht, 1998)
- Vicious Circle (Televisiefilm, 1999) - Krol
- in de clinch (TV series, 1998)
- Missink Link (1999) - Adam
- Maten (Televisiefilm, 1999) - Rob
- Baantjer TV series - Albert Kruik (Afl., De Cock en de moord met illusie, 1999)
- Total Loss (2000) - Duco van Poelgeest
- Russen TV series - Frits (Afl., Carte Blanche, 2000)
- Wildschut & De Vries TV series - Wennekers (2000)
- Hundred Percent (2000) - Rol onbekend
- De belager (Televisiefilm, 2000) - Advocaat
- De zwarte meteoor (2000) - Jaap Stegehuis
- Necrocam (2001) - Sander
- Trauma 24/7 TV series- Robert van de Wetering (2002)
- De Enclave (Televisiefilm, 2002) - Lex
- Spangen TV series - Johan Laurens (Afl., Boete, 2002)
- Russen TV series - Harm Vuijk (Afl., Satan huilt, 2002)
- Pietje Bell (2002) - Jan Lampe, vader Sproet
- Boy meets Girl Stories #18 Het Hart (Serie filmgedichten, 2003)
- Brush with Fate (Televisiefilm, 2003) - Stijn
- Pietje Bell 2: De Jacht op de Tsarenkroon (2003) - Jan Lampe
- De Kroon (Mini-serie, 2004) - Prins Willem-Alexander
- Karin (Korte film, 2004) - Berend
- Grijpstra & De Gier TV series - Det. Rinus de Gier (36 afl., 2004-2006)
- Doornroosje (Korte film, 2005) - Vader
- Gloed (Korte film, 2006) - Jager
- Schimmen (Pilot TV series, 2006)
- Highland Gardens (Televisiefilm, 2007) - Frank
