= Ricky Koole =

Dutch singer and film actress

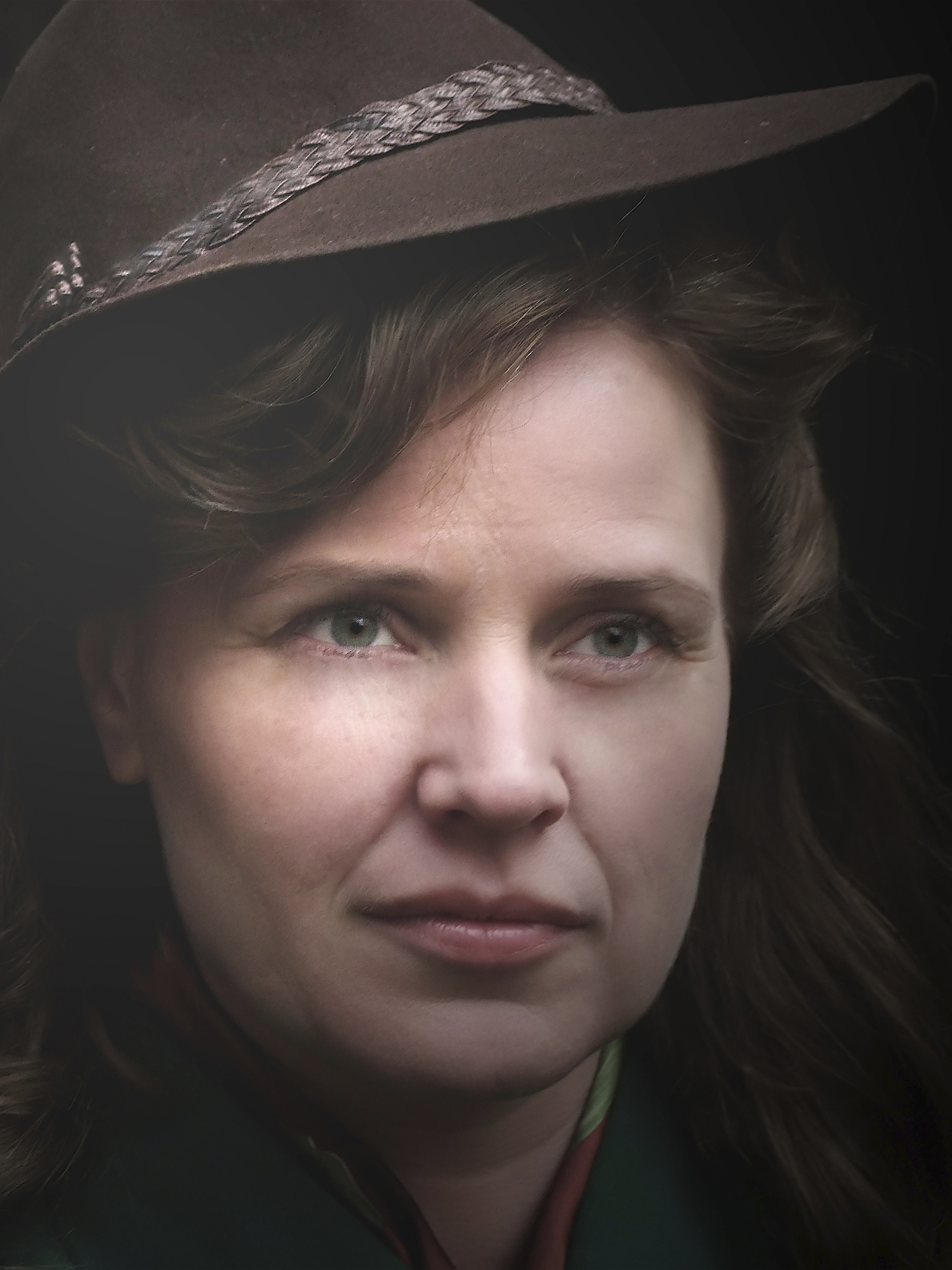
- Ricky Koole (2010)
- Born: 11 September 1972 (age 53); Delft, Netherlands
- Occupation: Actress
- Years active: 1996-present

Ricky Koole (born 11 September 1972) is a Dutch singer and film actress. She appeared in more than forty films since 1996.

== Personal life and career ==
Koole graduated in 1995 with a Bachelor of the Arts from the Kleinkunstacademie in Amsterdam. She has appeared in numerous TV series and films, and was nominated for several prizes including the prestigious Gouden Kalf. She creates theater shows focused on music, including several solo shows and collaborations with other musicians and with her partner Leo Blokhuis. As a singer and songwriter she has released multiple albums, including New Orleans Live, Ricky Koole with Ocobar, No Use Crying and Wind Om Het Huis.

Koole married Leo Blokhuis in 2012 and together they have a son.

== Selected filmography ==
Film
Year	Title	Role	Notes
2012	Kauwboy	July	
2011	Sonny Boy	Rika	
2008	The Silent Army	Anna Zuiderwijk	
2007	Kapitein Rob en het Geheim van Professor Lupardi	Marga	
2000	Total Loss	Muis	
2000	Leak	Ria	
1997	The Cherry Pick	Marie	
1996	The Dress	Chantalle	

Year	Title	Role	Notes
2005	Offers	Lidy	Television movie
2000	Ochtendzwemmers	Loes	Television movie
2000	Bij ons in de Jordaan	Karin	Television miniseries
1999	Man, Vrouw, Hondje	Milly	Television movie
