= Girl in Hyacinth Blue =

Novel by Susan Vreeland

- Author: Susan Vreeland
- Publication date: September 15, 1999
- Pages: 150
- ISBN: 1-878448-90-0

Girl in Hyacinth Blue is a novel by Susan Vreeland. It follows the history in reverse chronological order of a painting claimed to be by Johannes Vermeer.

== Background ==
As a child, Susan Vreeland was exposed to art media by her neighbor, a professor at San Diego State University, and literature from Guy de Maupassant and Robert Louis Stevenson. Many of her stories involved art.

== Plot ==
Girl in Hyacinth Blue is made of several stories focusing on the story of a fictional Vermeer painting. Chapters are organized in reverse chronological order. The book starts with two teachers, one in possession of the titular painting named Cornelius Engelbrecht, debate over its authenticity. Engelbrecht does not have the documentation to prove it. His father, a Nazi, got the painting from a Jewish family in Amsterdam. The following chapters explores the relations within the Jewish family that year before the painting was stolen, a Dutch couple going through marital issues over the painting, a Dutch farm during the Christmas Flood of 1717, an engineer losing the painting, and Vermeer painting the piece using his own daughter as a model.

== Reception ==
Publishers Weekly stated that the different perspectives of the book added dimension to the story. In a review by World and I, it was commented how Vreeland circumvented a common issue of short stories, described by World and I as the author explaining the plausibility of their story "it happens", by writing about the history of the painting. Linda Broughton writing for the ALAN Review noted that the novel was highly readable.

The book is a New York Times Best Seller.

== Legacy ==
Girl in Hyacinth Blue inspired the 2003 movie Brush with Fate.
