= Turkish Delight (1973 film) =

1973 film by Paul Verhoeven

- Theatrical release poster
- Dutch: Turks fruit
- Directed by: Paul Verhoeven
- Screenplay by: Gerard Soeteman
- Based on: Turks Fruit by Jan Wolkers
- Produced by: Rob Houwer
- Starring: Monique van de Ven; Rutger Hauer
- Cinematography: Jan de Bont
- Edited by: Jan Bosdriesz
- Music by: Rogier van Otterloo
- Production company: Rob Houwer Film Holland
- Distributed by: Nederland Film
- Release date: 22 February 1973
- Running time: 108 minutes
- Country: Netherlands
- Language: Dutch
- Budget: €365,000

Turkish Delight (Dutch: Turks fruit) is a 1973 Dutch erotic romantic drama film directed by Paul Verhoeven from a screenplay by Gerard Soeteman, based on the 1969 novel Turks Fruit by Jan Wolkers. It is a love story of an artist and a young woman, and was the film debut of both of its stars, Rutger Hauer and Monique van de Ven.

Turkish Delight is the most successful film in the history of Dutch cinema. The film was a massive success at the Dutch box office; according to Alle Record, 3,338,000 people saw the film, while the Netherlands Film Festival puts it at 3.5 million, corresponding to about 26% of the population of the Netherlands at the time. In 1973 it was nominated for an Academy Award for Best Foreign Language Film and in 1999, it received a special Golden Calf Award for Best Dutch Film of the Century. It was entered into the Canon of Dutch Cinema in 2007. In 2005, it was adapted into a musical, starring Antonie Kamerling and Jelka van Houten.

== Plot ==
Sculptor Eric Vonk wakes up recalling disturbing dreams where he ambushes and murders characters still unknown to the audience. He eventually cleans up his dingy studio, but only to trawl the streets of Amsterdam in search of random women whom he takes back home for sex. This combination of violent fantasies, promiscuity and occasional misogyny is not intrinsic to him, but rather the outcome of a distressing memory: his failed relationship with Olga Stapels. The film then flashes back two years to the time they first met.

Olga picks up Eric when he is hitchhiking, and they immediately have sex in her car. This first tryst is followed by a traffic accident, and Eric is initially prevented from seeing Olga again by her middle-class mother, who strongly dislikes him and blames him for the crash. However, the two lovers reconnect and start a passionate affair which, while opposed by her mother, is seen sympathetically by her easy-going father. They eventually get married, and Olga's mother and closest circle of friends grudgingly accept Eric.

Sometime later, Eric lands a 5000-guilder commission to prepare a sculpture for the garden of the hospital where his friend Paul works. Olga models for the statue, which is unveiled by the Dutch queen. The unveiling ceremony is successful for the hospital, but the artist and model are prevented from attending on the front line by the queen's security detail because of Olga's revealing dress. Out of frustration, Eric and Olga throw the maquettes into the canals of Amsterdam.

Olga's father dies from illness shortly thereafter. Instead of taking care of the Stapels family business, Eric then takes Olga back to Amsterdam, where he continues his artistic career and she takes a job in a dairy production line. This infuriates Olga's mother, who feels that a Bohemian sculptor earning little from occasional commissions is an unsuitable husband.

Eric and Olga's life together, while initially happy, is marred by bouts of strange behavior by Olga, including unexplainable reveries and rampant impulsivity. This tendency reaches a pitch of conflict at a family gathering in a Chinese restaurant. Eric finds himself insidiously baited into following Olga to the party, where he witnesses her flirting openly with a family friend, with the overt complicity of the rest of the diners. This prompts Eric to projectile vomit over the attendants and slap Olga. She leaves Eric, who proceeds to trash his studio, destroying anything that reminds him of her. This brings the narrative to the point where it opened, ending the flashback.

Eric is still obsessed with Olga. Her family refuses to let him visit her until he says he has come to arrange a divorce. His short stay sours when Olga's mother walks in on Eric raping Olga, and he is banished from her life permanently. Olga later becomes engaged to a wealthy American and visits Eric to pick up the remainder of her things before leaving for the United States. Eric comes to terms with her departure, and his closure is symbolized by a minor subplot in which he rescues a wounded seagull and sets it free once its wing heals.

Sometime later, Eric walks into a commercial center and spots Olga, flamboyantly dressed and acting oddly. She reveals that her American experience was a disaster and that she is living with her mother again. She suddenly collapses and Eric takes her to Paul's hospital, where she is diagnosed as having a brain tumor. Surgical intervention to remove the tumor is not entirely successful, and her death becomes an inevitable eventuality. Eric brings her a wig and Turkish delight, which is the only thing she will eat, as she mistakenly fears harder food will break her teeth. Soon after, she has a seizure and dies. Eric walks outside, past his sculpture of Olga, and solemnly dumps her wig in the trash.

== Cast ==
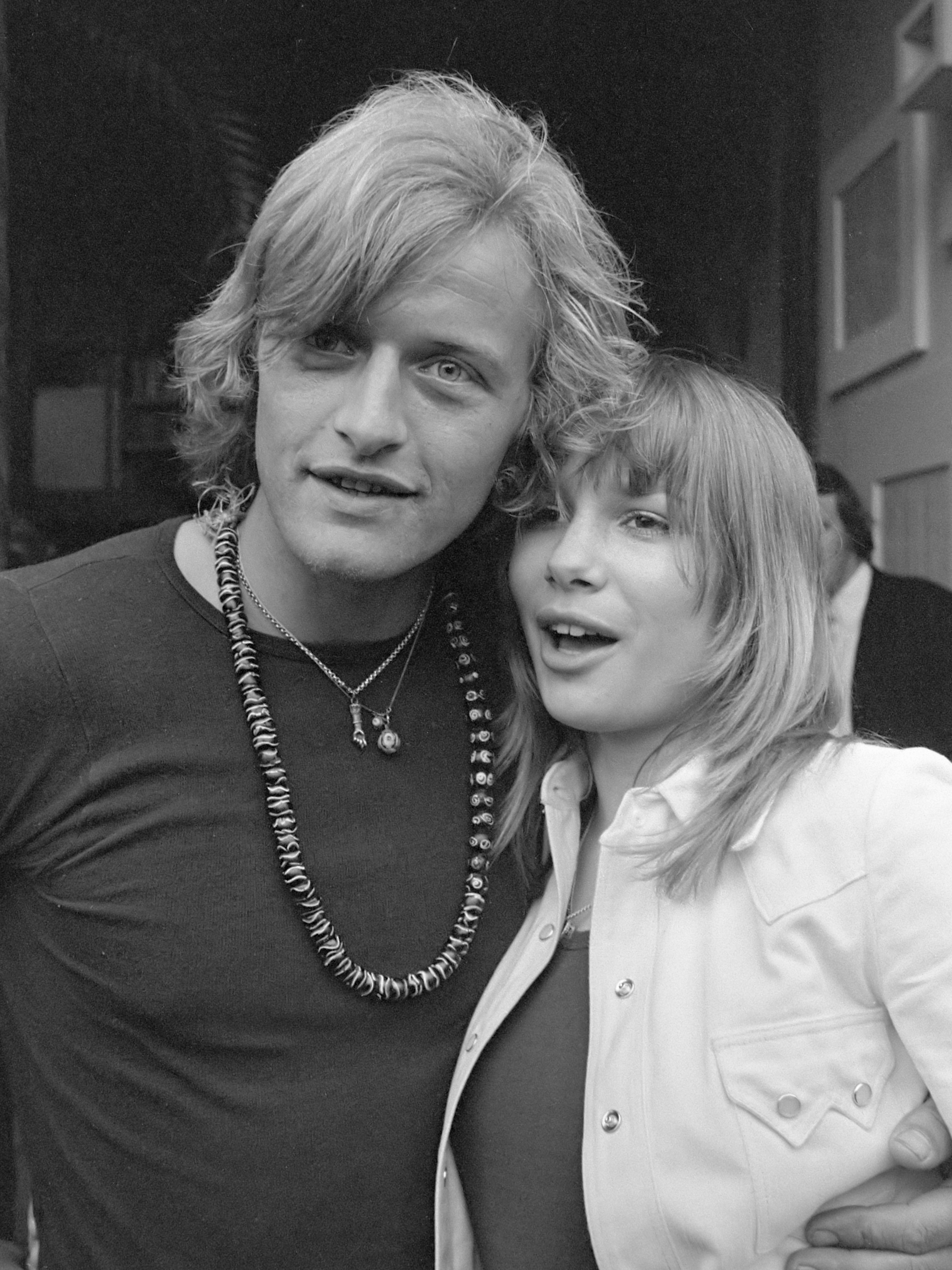
Rutger Hauer and Monique van de Ven in June 1972

- Monique van de Ven as Olga Stapels
- Rutger Hauer as Eric Vonk
- Tonny Huurdeman as Olga's Mother
- Wim van den Brink as Olga's Father
- Hans Boskamp as Shop Manager
- Dolf de Vries as Paul
- Manfred de Graaf as Henny
- Dick Scheffer as Accountant
- Marjol Flore as Tineke
- Bert Dijkstra as Servant
- David Rappaport as Dwarf

== Production ==
Filming locations included Amsterdam, Alkmaar, Bussum, Rotterdam and Zaandam in the Netherlands.

== Reception ==
Turkish Delight has an approval rating of 86% on review aggregator website Rotten Tomatoes, based on 7 reviews, and an average rating of 7.2/10. In the vote for best Dutch film of the twentieth century at the Netherlands Film Festival in 1999, Turkish Delight won first place.

== See also ==
- List of submissions to the 46th Academy Awards for Best Foreign Language Film
- List of Dutch submissions for the Academy Award for Best Foreign Language Film
