= Timboektoe =

2007 film

- Theatrical release poster
- Directed by: Dave Schram
- Written by: Maria Peters
- Starring: Bo Maerten; Mees Peijnenburg; Willem Voogd
- Cinematography: Hein Groot
- Edited by: Ot Louw
- Production companies: Shooting Star Filmcompany; Katholieke Radio Omroep
- Distributed by: RCV Film Distribution; Bridge Pictures
- Release date: 4 October 2007
- Country: Netherlands
- Language: Dutch

Timboektoe (English: Timbuktu) is a 2007 Dutch film based on a series of novels by Carry Slee. The film received the Golden Film after it had sold 100,000 cinema tickets.

== Cast ==
- Bo Maerten as Isa
- Mees Peijnenburg as Tim Ferket
- Willem Voogd as Henk
- Isabelle Houdtzagers as Nona
- Anna Raadsveld as Annabel
- Reinout Scholten van Aschat as Stef
- Geza Weisz as Romeo
- Jeronimo van Ballegoijen as Brian
- Cosmo de Vos as Edgar
- Daniel Cornelissen as Justin
- Anne Wallis de Vries as Anouk
- Liessanne Schenkkan as Valerie
- Ruben Lürsen as Ad
- Mouna Goeman Borgesius as Hanna
- Marcel Hensema as Jean
- Khaldoun Elmecky as father Nona
- Esmée de la Bretonière as mother Nona
- Marline Williams as Lucy
- Mike Reus as Arthur
- Margo Dames as Agnes
- Katja Herbers as Arlette

== Release ==
The film was released on DVD on 14 February 2008.
