= Total Loss (2000 film) =

2000 Dutch psychological thriller drama film

- Theatrical release poster
- Directed by: Dana Nechushtan
- Written by: Marco van Geffen
- Based on: Total Loss by Karst Woudstra
- Produced by: Leontine Petit; Joost de Vries
- Starring: Roef Ragas; Franky Ribbens; Yorick van Wageningen
- Cinematography: Bert Pot
- Edited by: Peter Alderliesten
- Music by: Han Otten; Maurits Overdulve
- Production companies: Lemming Film; VPRO-TV; Ma.Ja.De. Filmproduktion
- Distributed by: Warner Bros.
- Release date: 10 February 2000
- Running time: 95 minutes
- Countries: Netherlands; Germany
- Languages: Dutch; German

Total Loss is a 2000 Dutch psychological thriller drama film directed by Dana Nechushtan and written by Marco van Geffen based on the play by Karst Woudstra of the same name. The film stars Franky Ribbens, Roef Ragas and Yorick van Wageningen in the lead roles.

The film was released in the Netherlands on 10 February 2000 by Warner Bros. to negative reviews from critics.

== Cast ==
- Franky Ribbens as Jeroen Hekking
- Roef Ragas as Duco van Poelgeest
- Yorick van Wageningen as Reinier Kloprogge
- Mike Libanon as Armin
- Ricky Koole as Muis
- Luc Boyer as Father Hekking
- Hans Bakker as Bodyguard
- Gerrie van der Klei as Junkfrau
- Danny de Kok as Cyclist
- Tijn Docter as Co-assistant
- Boris van der Ham as Co-assistant
- Elvira Out as Woman at boat
- Harriet Stroet as Nurse
