= Maria Peters (film director) =

Dutch film producer and director

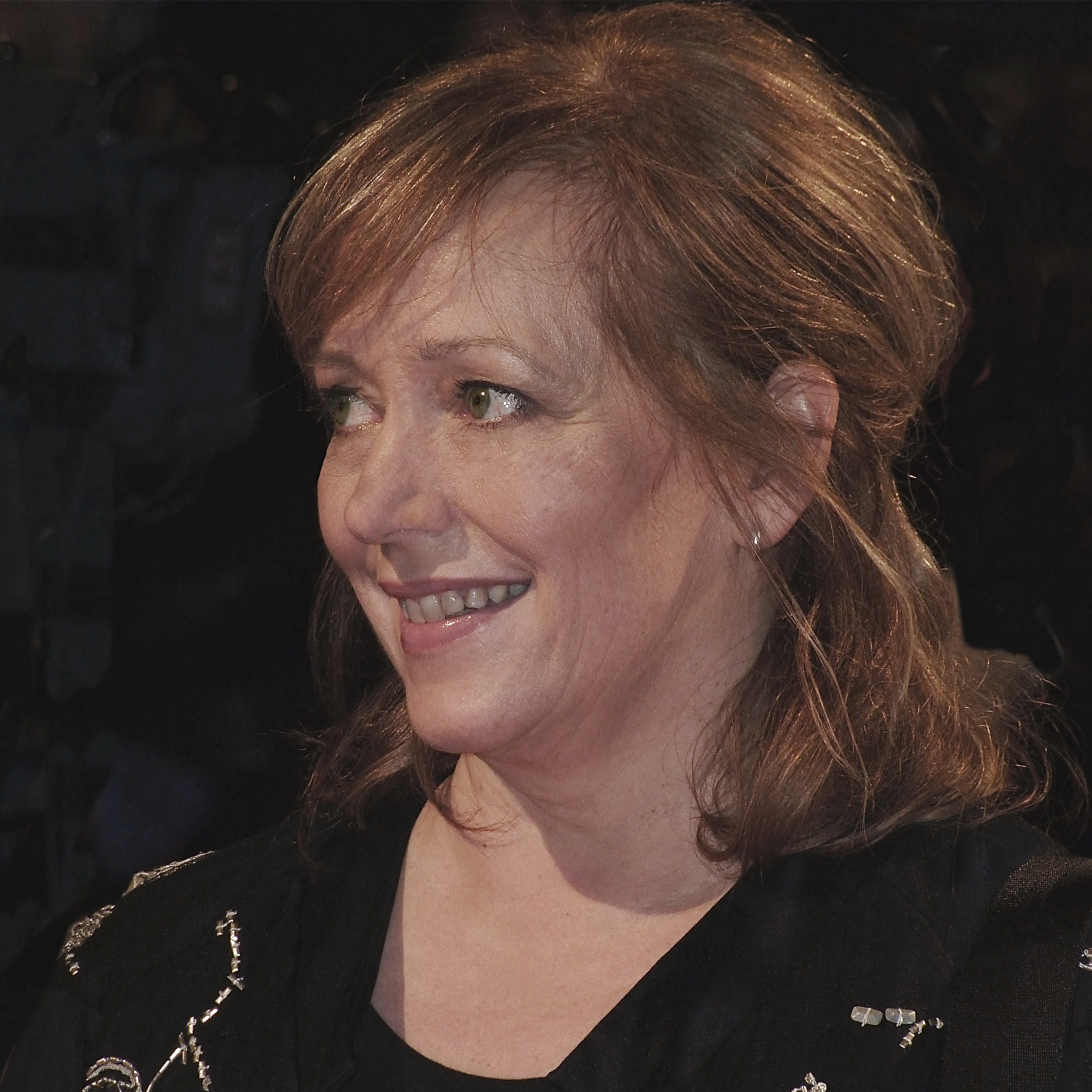
- Peters in 2011.
- Born: March 30, 1958 (age 67); Willemstad
- Occupations: Film producer; director; screenwriter
- Years active: 1981–present
- Notable work: Little Crumb, Peter Bell
- Spouse: Dave Schram
- Children: 2, including Tessa Schram

Maria C. Peters is a Dutch film producer, film director and screenwriter.

== Biography ==
Peters studied law at the University of Amsterdam. After her candidacy, she studied at the Netherlands Film Academy. where she graduated in 1983 with the (short) feature film Alle vogels vliegen.

In the years following her graduation, Maria Peters worked on several productions, such as Abel (1986), Honneponnetje (1988) and De orionnevel (1987).

In 1989, she founded the film production company Shooting Star Filmcompany with her husband Dave Schram and producer Hans Pos.

== Personal life ==
She is the mother of actors Quinten and Tessa Schram

== Filmography ==
Year	Title	Director	Screenplay	Producer	Ref
1995	The Purse Snatcher	No	No	Yes	
1999	Little Crumb	Yes	Yes	No	
2001	Baby Blue	No	No	Yes	
2002	Peter Bell: The Movie	Yes	Yes	No	
2003	Peter Bell II: The Hunt for the Czar Crown	Yes	Yes	No	
2007	Captain Rob and the Secret of Professor Lupardi	No	No	Yes	
2007	Radeloos	No	No	Yes	
2011	Sonny Boy	Yes	Yes	No	
2016	Prey	No	No	Yes	
