= Baby Blue (2001 film) =

2001 English-language Dutch thriller film

- Theatrical release poster
- Directed by: Theo van Gogh
- Screenplay by: Tomas Ross
- Produced by: Hans Pos; Dave Schram; Maria Peters
- Starring: Roeland Fernhout; Susan Vidler; Oliver Cotton; Nienke Römer
- Cinematography: Tom Erisman
- Edited by: Ot Louw
- Music by: Rainer Hensel
- Production companies: Shooting Star Filmcompany; VARA
- Distributed by: Buena Vista International
- Release date: 25 January 2001
- Running time: 119 minutes
- Country: Netherlands
- Languages: English; Dutch

Baby Blue is a 2001 English-language Dutch thriller film directed by Theo van Gogh. Filming took place in the Netherlands and Curaçao.

The film was released in the Netherlands by Buena Vista International on 25 January 2001.

== Cast ==
- Roeland Fernhout as Peter de Wilde
- Susan Vidler as Laura Wood
- Oliver Cotton as Ron Wood
- Nienke Römer as Marjan de Wilde

== Home media ==
The film was released on VHS as a rental on 28 August 2001 and a stand-alone release on 5 December by Buena Vista Home Entertainment under the Touchstone Home Video imprint.
