= Prey (2016 film) =

2016 Dutch action comedy horror film

- Theatrical release poster
- Directed by: Dick Maas
- Written by: Dick Maas
- Produced by: Dave Schram; Maria Peters; Dick Maas
- Starring: Sophie van Winden; Julian Looman; Mark Frost; Rienus Krul
- Cinematography: Lennert Hillege
- Edited by: Bert Rijkelijkhuizen
- Music by: Dick Maas
- Production companies: Shooting Star Filmcompany; Parachute Pictures
- Distributed by: Dutch FilmWorks
- Release date: 13 October 2016
- Running time: 103 minutes
- Country: Netherlands
- Language: Dutch
- Box office: $6.8 million

Prey (Dutch: Prooi), also known as Uncaged, is a 2016 Dutch action comedy horror film written and directed by Dick Maas about a murderous lion roaming the streets in Amsterdam. The film stars Sophie van Winden, Julian Looman and Mark Frost.

The film was released on 13 October 2016. Despite receiving positive reviews, the film was a box office flop in the Netherlands. but was a success in China.

== Plot ==
A family is found slaughtered on a farm near Amsterdam. Chief Inspector Olaf Brinkers (Rienus Krul) suspects that this is no ordinary crime scene, and brings in Lizzy (Sophie van Winden), a veterinarian at ARTIS, to assist. Lizzy, who has spent several years in Tanzania, immediately confirms Brinkers' suspicions; that the deaths were the work a large, male lion. Later that day, a golfer is killed in broad daylight, showing that the lion has moved into the city.

Despite Brinkers and Lizzy's evidence, Police Commissioner Zaimberg (Theo Pont) refuses to believe a lion is responsible until another death - that of a delivery driver - forces him to act. Lizzy recommends that he use a professional hunter, but Zaimberg opts to call his cousin, Theo (Victor Löw), an amateur hunter whose experience is limited to game farms. Lizzy's fears prove justified, as both Theo and his son, Kido (Marijn Klaver), are killed during the hunt (the latter by falling onto a bear trap). The lion is then seen on a city tram, where it attacks the passengers, making its presence known to the city at large.

Humiliated, Zaimberg agrees to Lizzy's recommendation. She calls in Jack Delarue (Mark Frost), a wheelchair-using big game hunter from England, who also happens to be her ex-boyfriend. This causes tensions with Lizzy's current boyfriend, TV news cameraman Dave (Julian Looman), who views the eccentric Delarue as a threat. Delarue immediately alienates Zaimberg by suggesting they use Theo's body as bait, something that Zaimberg refuses to even consider. That afternoon, a young boy (who had snuck out of his house) is killed at a playground. Zaimberg sends a team of armed officers to find the lion, but they end up shooting a group of army veterans conducting their own hunt. With this latest embarrassment, Zaimberg has no choice but to agree to Delarue's plan.

That night, Delarue successfully baits the lion and injures it, but Theo's body disappears while Delarue is chasing his target. Delarue and Lizzy track the lion to the University of Amsterdam's Medical Building, where they determine it has broken in through the basement. The two enter the building and have a series of running encounters with the lion - which seems to be everywhere at once - that leave Delarue severely injured. Trapped in the building's morgue, Lizzy lures the lion to the cold room, where she sprays it with poison gas. As it succumbs, the lion rips Lizzy's gas mask off, putting her at risk, and she is rescued by Dave, who has followed their trail. Moments later, the lion escapes the cold room and attacks Dave, while Lizzy grabs an awl and stabs the lion through the head, finally killing it. However, their relief is short-lived, as they discover that Delarue has died from his injuries.

While Lizzy accompanies Delarue's body to the hospital, she gets a call from Dave, who comments how the lion was strong enough to break through a double-glazed window. Lizzy tells him that he's mistaken, but Dave insists that he can see its tracks near the window; tracks that lead away from the building. Lizzy comes to a horrifying realization; there were two lions, not one. And the other is still out there.

As Lizzy processes this, the ambulance crew open the door to investigate a noise, only for it to be ripped off its hinges by the second lion, which proceeds to attack the paramedics. The lion then turns its attention to Delarue's body, allowing Lizzy time to escape, enter an abandoned truck, and ram the ambulance. As the lion tries to reach her, Lizzy pushes the ambulance in front of a train, destroying it, and seemingly the lion, in a large explosion.

Some time later, Lizzy and Dave are reconciled and have adopted a dog named "Simba". However, as they stroll through the park, a low growl is heard from the bushes...

== Cast ==
- Sophie van Winden as Lizzy
- Julian Looman as Dave
- Mark Forst as Jack DelaRue
- Rienus Krul as Brinkers
- Theo Pont as Commissioner
- Victor Löw as Commissioner's cousin
- Pieter Derks as Maarten
- Jaap ten Holt as Farmer
- Jessica Zeylmaker as Farmer's wife
- Kees Boot as Golfer
- Rutger de Bekker as Golfer
- Mattijn Hartemink as Golfer
- Mamoun Elyounoussi as Roti delivery driver
- Bart Klever as Hotel guest

== Release ==
=== Critical response ===
The film received mostly positive reviews from critics in the Netherlands. Floortje Smit of de Volkskrant wrote that Prey is an entertaining thriller, but that it's also a "fine addition to his oeuvre full of middle fingers to Dutch tittle-tattle and regulatory fervor".

Bart van der Put of Het Parool gave the film a mixed review, stating that the film is weaker than Maas' previous works.

=== Box office ===
The film was a flop in the Netherlands, only having 30.000 visitors and grossing over $231,548 at the Dutch box office.

In 2019, the film received a Chinese release in 4000 theaters where it grossed over $6.5 million at the box office.
