= Jan Wolkers =

Dutch sculptor and writer (1925–2007)

Jan Hendrik Wolkers
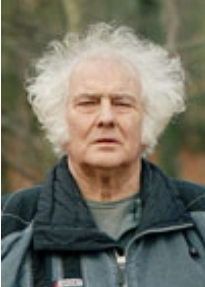
- Wolkers in 1995
- Born: 26 October 1925; Oegstgeest, Netherlands
- Died: 19 October 2007 (aged 81); Texel, Netherlands
- Occupations: Writer, sculptor, painter
- Writing career
- Period: 1961–2007
- Genre: Novels

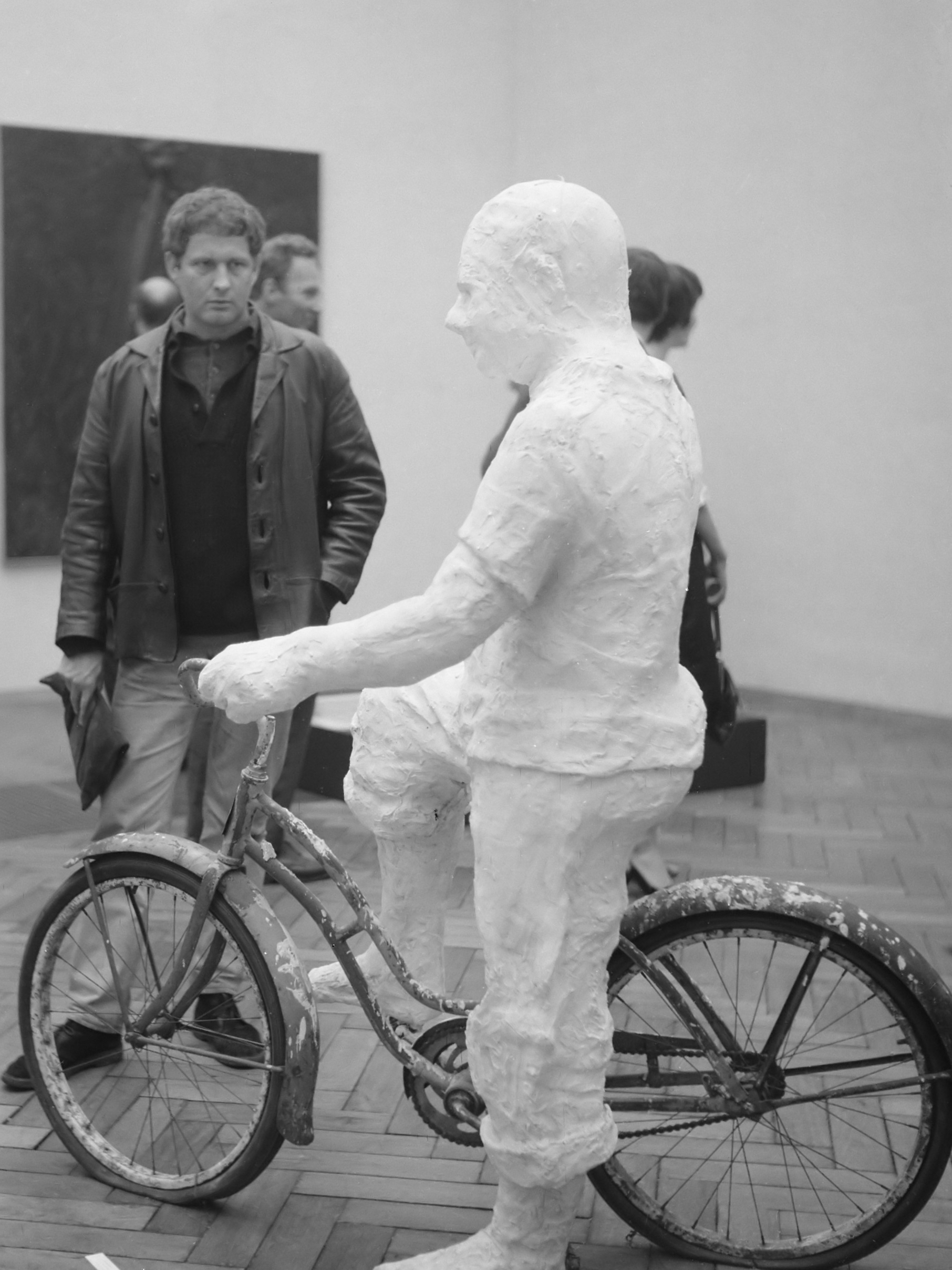
Wolkers in 1964

Jan Hendrik Wolkers (26 October 1925 – 19 October 2007) was a Dutch author, sculptor and painter. Wolkers is considered by some to be one of the "Great Four" writers of post-World War II Dutch literature, alongside Willem Frederik Hermans, Harry Mulisch and Gerard Reve (the latter authors are also known as the "Great Three").

Wolkers was born in Oegstgeest. He became noted as an author in the 1960s mainly for his graphic descriptions of sexual acts, which were often subject of controversy. His 1969 novel Turks Fruit was translated into ten languages and published in English as Turkish Delight. It was also made into a highly successful movie, the Paul Verhoeven-directed Turks Fruit (1972) which was nominated for an Academy Award for Best Foreign Language Film and in 1999 won the award for Best Dutch Film of the Century.

Wolkers declined several literary awards. In 1982 he refused the Constantijn Huygensprijs, and in 1989 he refused the P.C. Hooftprijs.

From 1980 until his death, Wolkers resided on the Dutch island of Texel. He died on 19 October 2007, aged 81, at his Texel home and was cremated in Amsterdam at De Nieuwe Ooster cemetery.

A number of his outdoor sculptures in the Netherlands have been subject to vandalism, presumably due to his use of glass as a construction material. Some examples are the Auschwitz monument in Amsterdam and the monument on the dike at Ceres on Texel. In reaction to the destruction of the monument in 2003, Wolkers announced that he would use less glass and more steel for such monuments in future. The Jac. P. Thijsse monument on Texel does contain more steel, but glass is still a substantial part of the artwork.

Since 2019, the private and literary archive of Jan Wolkers has been available at Leiden University Library.

== Bibliography ==
- 1961, Serpentina's petticoat (stories)
- 1962, Kort Amerikaans/Crew Cut (novel)
- 1963, Gesponnen suiker/Cotton Candy (stories)
- 1963, De Babel/The Babel (play)
- 1963, Een roos van vlees/A rose of flesh (novel)
- 1964, De hond met de blauwe tong/The dog with the blue tongue (stories)
- 1965, Terug naar Oegstgeest/Return to Oegstgeest (autobiographic novel)
- 1967, Horrible tango (novel)
- 1969, Turks fruit/Turkish Delight (novel)
- 1971, Groeten van Rottumerplaat/Greetings from Rottumerplaat (autobiographical documentary)
- 1971, Werkkleding/Workclothing (autobiographical documentary)
- 1974, De walgvogel/The dodo (novel)
- 1974, Dagboek 1974/Diary 1974
- 1975, Dominee met strooien hoed/Vicar with straw hat (novelle)
- 1977, De kus/The Kiss (novel)
- 1979, De doodshoofdvlinder/The death-head hawkmoth (novel)
- 1980, De perzik van onsterfelijkheid/The peach of immortality (novel)
- 1981, Alle verhalen/All stories
- 1981, Brandende liefde/Burning Love (novel)
- 1982, De junival/The June trap (novel)
- 1983, Gifsla/Poisoned lettuce (roman)
- 1984, De onverbiddelijke tijd/The unforgiving time (roman)
- 1985, 22 sprookjes, verhalen en fabels/22 fairy tales, stories and fables
- 1988, Kunstfruit en andere verhalen/Artificial fruit and other stories
- 1989, Jeugd jaagt voorbij/Youth passes by
- 1991, Tarzan in Arles (essays)
- 1991, Wat wij zien en horen/What we see and hear (stories, together with Bob and Tom Wolkers)
- 1994, Rembrandt in Rommeldam (essays)
- 1995, Zwarte bevrijding/Black Liberation (book-week essay)
- 1996, Icarus en de vliegende tering/Icarus and the wasting disease
- 1997, Mondriaan op Mauritius/Mondrian on Mauritius (essays)
- 1998, Het kruipend gedeelte des aardbodems/The crawling part of earth's surface (speech)
- 1999, Omringd door zee/Surrounded by sea (columns)
- 1999, De spiegel van Rembrandt/Rembrandt's mirror.
- 2005, Zomerhitte/Summer heat ("Boekenweekgeschenk")
- 2005, Dagboek 1974/Diary 1974
- 2006, 2 Texel: Drummers Double Bill & Jan Wolkers (CD – music and spoken word)
- 2007, De ladder naar lust/The scale towards lust (dictation, written for the Great Dutch Language Dictation 2007)
- 2008, Het was wel een heel lief varkentje

=== Graphic novels ===
In 2006 and 2007 the novel Kort Amerikaans (Crew Cut, 1962) was made into a graphic novel (in 2 parts) by Dick Matena.

== Films based on Wolkers' work ==
- Turks Fruit (1973), directed by Paul Verhoeven, nominated for an Academy Award for Best Foreign Language Film
- Kort Amerikaans (1979), directed by Guido Pieters
- Brandende Liefde (1983), directed by Ate de Jong
- En Ros Av Kött (1985), directed by Jon Lindström, Swedish television film based on Een roos van vlees
- Terug naar Oegstgeest (1987), directed by Theo van Gogh
- Summer Heat (2008), directed by Monique van de Ven
