= Peter Bell II: The Hunt for the Czar Crown =

2003 Dutch family film

Peter Bell II: The Hunt For The Czar Crown
- Theatrical release poster
- Directed by: Maria Peters
- Screenplay by: Maria Peters
- Based on: Pietje Bell by Chris van Abkoude
- Produced by: Dave Schram; Hans Pos
- Starring: Quinten Schram; Rick Engelkes; Katja Herbers; Stijn Westenend; Arjan Ederveen; Willem Nijholt; Eric van der Donk; Roef Ragas; Felix Strategier; Angela Groothuizen
- Cinematography: Erwin Steen
- Edited by: Ot Louw
- Music by: Henny Vrienten
- Production companies: Shooting Star Filmcompany; Katholieke Radio Omroep
- Distributed by: Buena Vista International
- Release date: 18 December 2003
- Running time: 112 minutes
- Country: Netherlands
- Language: Dutch
- Box office: $4.3 million

Peter Bell II: The Hunt For The Czar Crown (Dutch: Pietje Bell 2: De Jacht op de Tsarenkroon) is a 2003 Dutch comedy drama film written and directed by Maria Peters. It is a sequel to Peter Bell: The Movie, based on the Pietje Bell books by Chris van Abkoude.

The film was released in the Netherlands on 18 December 2003 by Buena Vista International. It received a Golden Film (100,000 visitors) in December 2003 and Platinum Film (400,000 visitors) in January 2004. The film takes place in 1930's Rotterdam.

== Plot ==
Peter's sister Martha is getting engaged to Paul Velinga. They celebrate with a snowball fight in the street, during which a snowball flies through the front window of Geelman’s drug store. The situation does not seem serious, but when the drug store gets robbed the next day Peter quickly becomes a suspect and is locked up in jail before he is able to prove his innocence. There he finds the criminals he and his gang were able to put behind bars. When he discovers their plans, he is able to escape, and tries to find allies to thwart their nefarious plans to steal the Tsar's crown. He also has to deal with his sister's wedding.

== Cast ==
- Quinten Schram as Pietje Bell
- Frensch de Groot as Sproet
- Serge Price as Kees
- Felix Strategier as Vader Bell
- Angela Groothuizen as Moeder Bell
- Katja Herbers as Martha Bell
- Stijn Westenend as Jozef Geelman
- Arjan Ederveen as Drogist Geelman
- Rick Engelkes as Paul Velinga
- Jack Wouterse as Klok
- René van 't Hof as Teun
- Fedja van Huêt as Fuik
- Eric van der Donk as Meneer Ster
- Ingeborg Uyt den Boogaard as Mevrouw Ster
- Myrte Ouwerkerk as Sophie
- Willem Nijholt as Stark
- Johnny Kraaijkamp jr. as Bruinslot
- Roef Ragas as Jan Lampe

== Release ==
=== Box office ===
The film grossed $4,364,107.

=== Critical response ===
The film received mixed reviews from critics.

=== Home media ===
The film was released on DVD and VHS and as a DVD two-pack with the first film by Buena Vista Home Entertainment on 25 August 2004. The DVD release featured a commentary track from Maria Peters along with deleted scenes, bloopers, trailers, storyboards, behind the scenes and a photo gallery.

=== Accolades ===
Accolades received by Peter Bell II: The Hunt for the Czar Crown
Year	Award	Category	Recipient(s)	Result	Ref.
2004	Netherlands Film Festival	Golden Calf for Best Production Design	Ruud van Dijk	Nominated	
