= Panuganti Lakshminarasimha Rao =

Indian writer

- Born: 2 November 1865
- Died: 1 January 1940 (aged 74)
- Citizenship: Indian
- Occupation: Writer
- Writing career
- Language: Telugu

Panuganti Lakshmi Narasimharaavu (Telugu - పానుగంటి లక్ష్మీ నరసింహా రావు; 11 February 1865 – 1 January 1940) was one of the popular modern Telugu writers. He was born at Seetanagaram, Rajamundry, Andhra Pradesh. After his education, he became a teacher in Peddapuram High School. Later he moved to Pithapuram as 'Asthana Kavi' for the Pithapuram Rajah's kingdom.

He brought essays into prominence in Telugu literature. He is popularly known as "Andhra Shakespeare" and "Andhra Edison". He was awarded 'Abhinava Kalidas' by Venkata Sastry. He was one of the three famous writers of those days - Chilakamarthy Lakshmi Narasimham, Koochi Narasimham and Panuganti Lakshmi Narasimham - popularly known as 'Simha Trayam'.

== Literary works ==
- Sri Vishnu Naama Maala Strotram (1899)
- Narmada Purukutsiyam (1902)
- Saarangadhara (1904)
- Radhakrishna (1904): It is based on the tenets of Gaudiya Vaishnavism. He was inspired to write this play by Ashutosh Mukherji's Lord Gouranga. The play depicts the stages of development of Radha's simple bhakti growing into Mahabhava, its highest culmination usually associated with only Radha by vaishnava scholars. It is sought to elevate the image of Radha to Krishna's consort in Goloka, the heaven. The Sage Narada was used as an initiator and promoter of this dramatic action.
- Prachanda Chanakyamu (1909)
- Pattabhanga Raghavamu or Paadukaa Pattabhishekhamu (1909)
- Kokila (1909)
- Vijaya Raghavamu (1909)
- Vanavasa Raghavamu (1909)
- Vyjayanthi Vilasamu or Vipranaaraayana Charitra (1909)
- Buddha Bodha Sudha (1910)
- Vruddha Vivahamu (1910)
- Mano Mahima (1911)
- Saakshi (1913-1914; 1920-1922; 1927-1928; 1933)
- Kalyana Raaghavamu (1915)
- Kanthaabharanamu (1917)
- Kathalahari (1917)
- Hasyavallari (1917)
- Prakeershopanyasamulu (1918)
- Saraswathi (1920)
- Poornima (1922)
- Mudrika (1923)
- Veeramathi (1923)
- Chudamani
- Padmini (1929)
- Malatheemala (1929)
- Sarojini (1930)
- Raati Sthambhamu (1930)
- Vichitra Vivahamu (1931)
- Gunavathi (1948)
- Manimala (1948)
- Subbaraju (1948)
- Paraprema (1948)
- Ramaraju (1948)
- Chinna Natakamu (1948)
