= Tom Kane (film producer) =

Thomas John Kane is an American film and television producer, production manager and assistant director.

Kane began his career in New York City working as a production manager on films such as Prizzi's Honor, Taxi Driver, Raging Bull, Kramer vs. Kramer, An Unmarried Woman, The Turning Point, Night Hawks, Swimming to Cambodia and The Flamingo Kid.

After 16 years in New York City, Kane moved to Los Angeles and produced two television series for ABC: Fortune Dane and Sledge Hammer!. From 1988 to 1990, he served as vice president of production for the Weintraub Entertainment Group, overseeing television production. Kane was the producer of the Hallmark Hall of Fame production Brush with Fate, which aired on CBS. He freelances as a producer and/or production manager and is a long-time member of the Directors Guild of America.

Since 1984, Kane has taught film and television production.
