= Susan Vreeland =

American author

- Born: January 20, 1946; Racine, Wisconsin, U.S.
- Died: August 23, 2017 (aged 71); San Diego, California, U.S.
- Education: San Diego State University
- Occupation: Author
- Spouse: Joseph Gray (m. 1988–2017)
- Website: www.svreeland.com

Susan Joyce Vreeland (January 20, 1946 – August 23, 2017) was an American author. Several of her books deal with the relationship between art and fiction. The Passion of Artemisia is a fictionalized investigation of some aspects of the life of Artemisia Gentileschi, while Girl in Hyacinth Blue centers round an imaginary painting by Vermeer. The Forest Lover is a fictionalized account of the life of the Canadian painter Emily Carr.

== Early life ==
Vreeland was born in Racine, Wisconsin to William Alex Vreeland and Esther Alberta, née Jancovius. Her mother was from an artistic family and had studied at the Art Institute of Chicago. The family moved to California in 1948. Living in San Diego, her neighbor was a professor at San Diego State University who exposed Vreeland to art literature, which is the basis of much of her work. Vreeland took a BA in English and library science at San Diego State University in 1969, an MA in education in 1972, and an MA in English in 1978.

== Career ==
Vreeland worked as a teacher for thirty years at James Madison High School and University City High School. Her first novel was What Love Sees.

== Personal life ==
Vreeland was married to Kip Grey. She died in 2017 after heart surgery.

== Works ==
The works of Susan Vreeland include:

- What Love Sees: a biographical novel. New York: PaperJacks, 1988. ISBN 9780770108847.
- What English Teachers Want: A Survival Guide. Unionville, NY: Royal Fireworks Press, 1995. ISBN 9780880922241.
- Girl in Hyacinth Blue. Denver: MacMurray & Beck, 1999. ISBN 9781878448903.
- The Passion of Artemisia. New York: Viking, 2002. ISBN 9780670894499.
- The Forest Lover. New York: Viking, 2004. ISBN 9780670032679.
- Life Studies. New York: Viking, 2005. ISBN 9780670031771.
- Luncheon of the Boating Party. New York: Viking, 2007. ISBN 9780143113522.
- Clara and Mr. Tiffany. New York: Random House, 2011. ISBN 9781400068166.
- Lisette's List. New York: Random House, 2014. ISBN 9781410471291.
