= Pietje Bell =

Book series by Chris van Abkoude

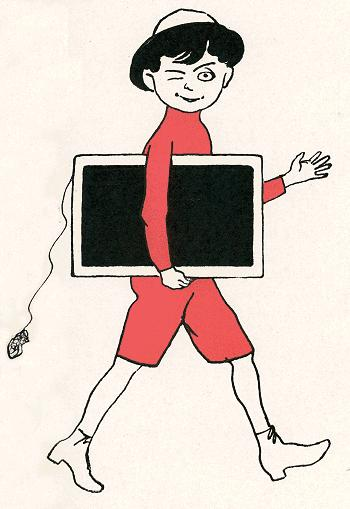
- Pietje Bell, drawn by Jan Rinke in Chris van Abkoude's 1914 novel Pietje Bell of de lotgevallen van een ondeugenden jongen
- Author: Chris van Abkoude
- Original title: Pietje Bell boeken
- Country: Netherlands
- Genre: Children's literature
- Media type: Print, audiobook

Pietje Bell is a series of children's books written by the Dutch author Chris van Abkoude.

The story has been adapted to film twice. Once, in 1964, as De Avonturen van Pietje Bell, by Henk van der Linden and again in 2002 and 2003 by Maria Peters.

In 2003, Ruud Bos adapted the novel into a musical called Pietje Bell de Musical.

Dick Matena also adapted the novel into a comic book album.

== List of books ==
- 1914 – Pietje Bell, of De lotgevallen van een ondeugenden jongen
- 1920 – De vlegeljaren van Pietje Bell
- 1922 – De zonen van Pietje Bell
- 1924 – Pietje Bell’s goocheltoeren
- 1929 – Pietje Bell in Amerika
- 1932 – Nieuwe avonturen van Pietje Bell
- 1934 – Pietje Bell is weer aan den gang
- 1936 – Pietje Bell gaat vliegen
