= Jennifer Hoffman =

American astrophysicist

- Education: University of California, Berkeley (BA, 1994); University of Wisconsin-Madison (MS, 1997) (PhD, 2002)
- Known for: Polarimetry
- Scientific career
- Workplaces: University of Denver
- Thesis: Locating Mass Loss: Numerical Modeling of Circumstellar Material in Binary Systems (2002)
- Doctoral advisor: Kenneth H. Nordsieck

Jennifer Hoffman is an American astrophysicist and associate professor at the University of Denver. She studies the circumstellar material around stars.

== Early life and education ==
In 1994 Hoffman graduated from University of California, Berkeley, having spent a year at University of Göttingen. Hoffman earned her PhD in 2002 from the University of Wisconsin–Madison. Advised by Kenneth Nordsieck, her dissertation was titled Locating Mass Loss: Numerical Modeling of Circumstellar Material in Binary Systems.

== Research and career ==
In 2003 Hoffman was appointed a National Science Foundation Astronomy and Astrophysics Postdoctoral Fellow at University of California, Berkeley. Here she compiled the Women in Astronomy Resource Page. She became more involved in activities to promote diversity in physics and astronomy, working with Meg Urry on the American Astronomical Society Committee on the Status of Women in Astronomy. She worked with the Lawrence Berkeley National Laboratory on modelling supernova ejecta.

At the University of Denver she leads on the HPOL spectropolarimeter. She was the Editor of the 2013 book, "Stellar Polimetry: From Birth to Death (AIP Conference Proceedings/Astronomy and Astrophysics)". In 2015 she was part of the Mintaka observing campaign. Hoffman's research group use three dimensional Monte Carlo radiative transfer to model the interaction of circumstellar material with the light of stars and supernovae.
