= The Columnist (film) =

- Promotional poster
- Dutch: De Kuthoer
- Directed by: Ivo van Aart
- Written by: Daan Windhorst; Patrick Doran
- Starring: Katja Herbers; Genio de Groot; Rein Hofman; Bram van der Kelen; Achraf Koutet; Claire Porro; Harry van Rijthoven; Seno Sever
- Cinematography: Martijn Cousijn
- Edited by: Imre Reutelingsperger; Yamal Stitou
- Music by: Jeffrey van Rossum
- Production companies: NL Film & TV
- Distributed by: Nederlandse Publieke Omroep; BNN-VARA
- Release dates: 20 December 2019 (NPO Start Plus); 8 January 2020 (Netherlands)
- Running time: 86 minutes
- Country: Netherlands
- Language: Dutch

The Columnist (Dutch: De Kuthoer, literally: The Cunt Whore) is a 2019 Dutch black comedy thriller film directed by Ivo van Aart. It follows an author (Katja Herbers) who receives anonymous death threats on social media and decides to take revenge. The film was released on 8 January 2020 in the Netherlands.

== Synopsis ==
Femke Boot is a depressed newspaper columnist who is dealing with pressure from her publisher to complete her book and a seemingly endless stream of online harassers. Discovering that her noisy, obnoxious neighbor is one of her harassers causes her to murder him and take one of his fingers as a trophy. This seems to lift her spirits enough to begin writing as well as take up a romance with a novelist named Steven.

As she continues to track down and murder her online abusers, Femke's frequent absences begin to take a toll on her relationships with Steven and her daughter Anna. Steven believes she is cheating on them while Anna is angry over her mother missing an important presentation.

Femke eventually tracks down the ringleader of the online bullying, Tarik, to his home. She shoots the one she believes to be Tarik, only to discover that she actually shot his father and that Tarik is a teenage boy. Meanwhile Anna and Steven have realized that Femke is a serial killer. He goes to stop her, only to startle her into shooting the boy dead. After a confrontation, Femke chooses to kill Steven and attend her book launch party. She does not change out of her bloody clothes, however the attendees all assume that she is making an artistic statement and applaud her.

== Cast ==
- Katja Herbers as Femke Boot
- Genio de Groot as Arend
- Rein Hofman as Arjen Tol
- Bram van der Kelen as Steven Dood
- Achraf Koutet as Tarik Bos
- Claire Porro as Anna Boot
- Harry van Rijthoven as Head of the school
- Seno Sever as Politieagent

== Production ==
Director Ivo van Aart came up with the idea for the film alongside writer Daan Windhorst and the two immediately thought of the word "Kuthoer", "a term of abuse that you often see on social media, where there are many threats and abuses." They chose to include "De" in order to signify that it was about a single person. The two also noted that they hoped the film would be a wakeup call about online bullying and abuse. The film is loosely based on a short story written by Windhorst.

Plans to film The Columnist were announced in 2019. Katja Herbers was brought on to play the central character of Femke Boot, a choice that van Aart states was influenced by her role in the second season of Westworld. Filming was slated to take place in early 2020.

== Release ==
The Columnist screened during August 2020 at the Fantasia Festival, where it had its North American premiere, and at FrightFest. In September of the same year the film screened on NPO 3 in the Netherlands, where it had a viewership of 308,000, after which it went to NPO Start.

== Reception ==
On Rotten Tomatoes, the film holds an approval rating of 80% based on 79 reviews, with an average rating of 6.9/10. The site's critics consensus reads, "Savagely funny and viscerally unsettling, The Columnist takes the unbridled vitriol of social media to its bloodily over-the-top conclusion." According to Metacritic, which assigned a weighted average score of 58 out of 100 based on 12 critics, the film received "mixed or average reviews".

Common praise focused on the film's social commentary, which Film School Rejects and Bloody Disgusting found biting. Rue Morgue and Film Threat wrote favorable reviews, the former of which stated that it was "a sharp condemnation of those hiding behind their keyboards, hidden inside a hilarious look at a woman pushed to her breaking point. In the end, there are no winners at this game."
