= Sonny Boy (2011 film) =

- Theatrical release poster
- Directed by: Maria Peters
- Screenplay by: Maria Peters
- Based on: Sonny Boy by Annejet van der Zijl
- Produced by: Dave Schram; Hans Pos
- Starring: Ricky Koole; Sergio Hasselbaink; Marcel Hensema
- Cinematography: Walther Vanden Ende
- Edited by: Ot Louw
- Music by: Henny Vrienten
- Production companies: Shooting Star Filmcompany; Katholieke Radio Omroep
- Distributed by: A-Film Distribution
- Release date: 27 January 2011
- Running time: 132 minutes
- Country: Netherlands
- Language: Dutch
- Box office: $4,581,706

Sonny Boy is a 2011 Dutch film directed by Maria Peters, based on the book by Annejet van der Zijl, which itself is based on the true story of Waldy Nods (1929-2015) and his parents' interracial love during the 1920s-40s through World War II.

The film, produced by Shooting Star Filmcompany, was selected as the Dutch entry for the Best Foreign Language Film at the 84th Academy Awards, but it did not make the final shortlist.

== Plot ==
In 1928, a young man from Suriname named Waldemar Nods goes to the Netherlands to study. His dark skin stands out and he faces discrimination. He moves in with Rika van der Lans in her lodging in The Hague; Rika is living separated from her deeply religious husband Willem, after she discovered him cheating with the maid Jans. She has taken all four of their children, Wim, Jan, Bertha and Henk, with her.

Waldemar and Rika, seventeen years his senior, start a relationship and she becomes pregnant. She says nothing to Waldemar about the pregnancy and goes to a woman for a clandestine abortion, but changes her mind. When she is four months pregnant she tells Waldemar. He is angry for not having been told earlier, and leaves. Wim and Jan run away, back to their father Willem. Waldemar returns, and when Willem visits Rika to tell her about a job opening in Indonesia, he asks her to come along. He will accept the baby as his own child. He changes his mind when he learns the father is dark-skinned. He also obtains a court order for Bertha and Henk to also live with him. He refuses a divorce, preventing Rika from marrying Waldemar.

When the child is born, they call the boy Waldy, nicknamed Sonny Boy. Rika’s landlord terminates the rental, because of Rika's extramarital affair, especially with a dark-skinned Surinamese. Rika and Waldemar roam the streets with Waldy, when they meet an older Jewish man, Sam, who rents them a room.

With financial support from Sam, Rika and Waldemar start a guesthouse in Scheveningen. When the Netherlands is invaded by the Germans, Rika and Waldemar are forced to give shelter to German soldiers. Later on they have to evacuate the guesthouse, as the area is cleared for the Atlantikwall defense system.

Because Rika is a mother of five children, she is allotted a large replacement house. At the request of a young resistance fighter, Kees Chardon, who she met through the help of a clergyman, Rika starts hiding people in her house. As the fee for Jews is higher than for Dutch, she chooses to hide Jewish people. After some time, a SS deserter hides in the guesthouse as well. At first Waldy is not aware about the individuals hiding there, but after witnessing Sam’s deportation and a street fight, Rika is visited by a collaborating official. Waldy hears something upstairs and discovers the hiding individuals. After a raid, the hidden are discovered and arrested, along with Waldemar, Rika and Waldy. Waldy is released and goes to live with relatives and eventually a foster family. This is not safe, as the Germans want to put more pressure on Waldemar and Rika during interrogations.

Waldy is then placed with a farmer. When people come to the farm during the winter famine, Waldy prevents a couple from selling their wedding rings for food, by offering up his parents’ rings. The farmer refuses Waldy’s rings and explains everybody tries to make some money during wartime, and Rika and Waldemar were paid for hiding people.

Waldemar is shipped to Neuengamme, but due to his language skills, he is drafted for the mailroom. This gives him an opportunity to send letters to Waldy clandestinely. After Hitler's death, Waldemar is deported on the ship Cap Arcona, which is bombed by British fighters. He jumps into the sea and manages to swim to shore. On arrival on the beach, he is killed by two German child soldiers. Sometime later, Marcel and Bertha arrive at a train station where they meet up with Waldy and take him to live with his maternal grandparents. He is given a letter written by his mother who wished her children and parents luck, with hopes of visiting her husband.

In the end credits, it is revealed Rika had died that year in KZ Ravensbrück after a dysentery epidemic. Waldy did not know the truth about his parents' deaths until sixty years later in 2004.

== Cast ==
- Ricky Koole as Rika van der Lans
- Sergio Hasselbaink as Waldemar Nods
- Daniel van Wijk as Waldy (Sonny Boy)
- Micha Hulshof as Marcel
- Wouter Zweers as Gerard
- Marcel Hensema as Willem
- Gaite Jansen as Bertha
- Martijn Lakemeier as Jan
- Frits Lambrechts as Sam
- Raymond Spannet as landlord
- Joy Wielkens as Hilda

== See also ==
- List of submissions to the 84th Academy Awards for Best Foreign Language Film
- List of Dutch submissions for the Academy Award for Best Foreign Language Film
