= Little Crumb =

- Theatrical release poster
- Directed by: Maria Peters
- Screenplay by: Maria Peters
- Based on: Kruimeltje by Chris van Abkoude
- Produced by: Dave Schram; Hans Pos
- Starring: Ruud Feltkamp; Hugo Haenen; Thekla Reuten; Rick Engelkes; Eric van der Donk; Sacha Bulthuis; Jan Decleir; John Kraaijkamp sr.
- Cinematography: Hein Groot
- Edited by: Ot Louw
- Music by: Henny Vrienten
- Production companies: Shooting Star Filmcompany; Katholieke Radio Omroep
- Distributed by: Buena Vista International
- Release date: 9 December 1999
- Running time: 119 minutes
- Country: Netherlands
- Language: Dutch
- Box office: 1.1 million admissions (Netherlands)

Little Crumb (Dutch: Kruimeltje) is a 1999 Dutch comedy drama film written and directed by Maria Peters, based on the 1923 novel Kruimeltje by Chris van Abkoude. The film was produced by Shooting Star Filmcompany and KRO. it was released in the Netherlands on 9 December 1999 by Buena Vista International.

It was the most popular Dutch film of the year and in the top 20 most popular Dutch films of all time. It was the Netherlands' submission to the 73rd Academy Awards for the Academy Award for Best Foreign Language Film, but was not accepted as a nominee.

== Plot ==
In December 1921, Kruimeltje (Little Crumb), a street urchin in Rotterdam, lives with the strict Mrs. Koster, having been left there by his mother long ago because she was unable to care for him. Mrs. Koster, a moody and hard-hearted alcoholic, regularly sends Kruimeltje out to earn money for her, but to her annoyance, he isn’t very successful, so she sends him out onto the streets. She herself earns money by polishing copper. Kruimeltje has a friend, Keesie, with whom he often has fun sledding or sneaking into the cinema without paying. A glazier pays Kruimeltje to break a window so he'll have work, but this ends up landing Kruimeltje in jail for the night.

Mrs. Koster is seriously injured after falling down the stairs, and on her deathbed she gives Kruimeltje a locket containing photos of his parents. Kruimeltje wants to go to America to look for his father, but a one-way ticket costs 300 guilders, and he is too young to be allowed to travel alone. Kruimeltje finds a dog, Moor, and decides to keep him. He then meets Wilkes, who discovers that his best friend, who left for America years ago, is Kruimeltje’s father.

Kruimeltje then befriends a pianist, Lize van Dien, who realizes from the locket Kruimeltje wears that he is her long-lost son. She initially does not tell him, because he said he wants nothing more to do with his mother, since she abandoned him.

Kruimeltje and Lize go to the harbor to pick up Wilkes when he returns from America. He has found Kruimeltje’s father, who has come along back home. Then Kruimeltje learns that Lize was his mother all along, and embraces her.

== Cast ==
- Ruud Feltkamp as Kruimeltje
- Hugo Haenen as Wilkes, Harry's best friend
- Rick Engelkes as Harry Folker, Kruimeltje's father
- Thekla Reuten as Lize van Dien, Kruimeltje's mother
- Yannick van de Velde as Keesie, Kruimeltje's friend
- Sacha Bulthuis as Mrs. Koster
- Ingeborg Uyt den Boogaard as Vera di Borboni, maid
- Jaap Maarleveld as old neighbour
- Joop Doderer as Koster
- Bert Geurkink as policeman
- Jan Decleir as Father Keyzer

== Release ==
=== Critical response ===
The film received positive reviews from critics.

=== Home media ===
The film was released on DVD and VHS on 22 November 2000 by Buena Vista Home Entertainment.

=== Accolades ===
Accolades received by Little Crumb
Year	Award	Category	Recipient(s)	Result	Ref.
2000	Netherlands Film Festival	Golden Calf for Best Director	Maria Peters	Nominated	
2000	Netherlands Film Festival	Golden Calf for Best Feature Film	Dave Schram; Hans Pos	Nominated	
2000	Netherlands Film Festival	Golden Calf for Best Script	Maria Peters	Nominated	

== See also ==
- Cinema of the Netherlands
- List of Dutch submissions for the Academy Award for Best Foreign Language Film
- List of submissions to the 73rd Academy Awards for Best Foreign Language Film
- 18th Ale Kino! Festival
