= Cassavetes =

Cassavetes (Greek: Κασσαβέτης) is a Greek surname. Notable people with the surname include:

- John Cassavetes (1929–1989), Greek-American independent film director
  - Katherine Cassavetes (1906–1983), his mother, an actress
  - Nick Cassavetes (born 1959), his son, an actor and director
  - Alexandra Cassavetes (born 1965), his daughter, an actress and director
  - Zoe Cassavetes (born 1970), his daughter, a director
