= Chris van Abkoude =

Dutch writer (1880–1960)

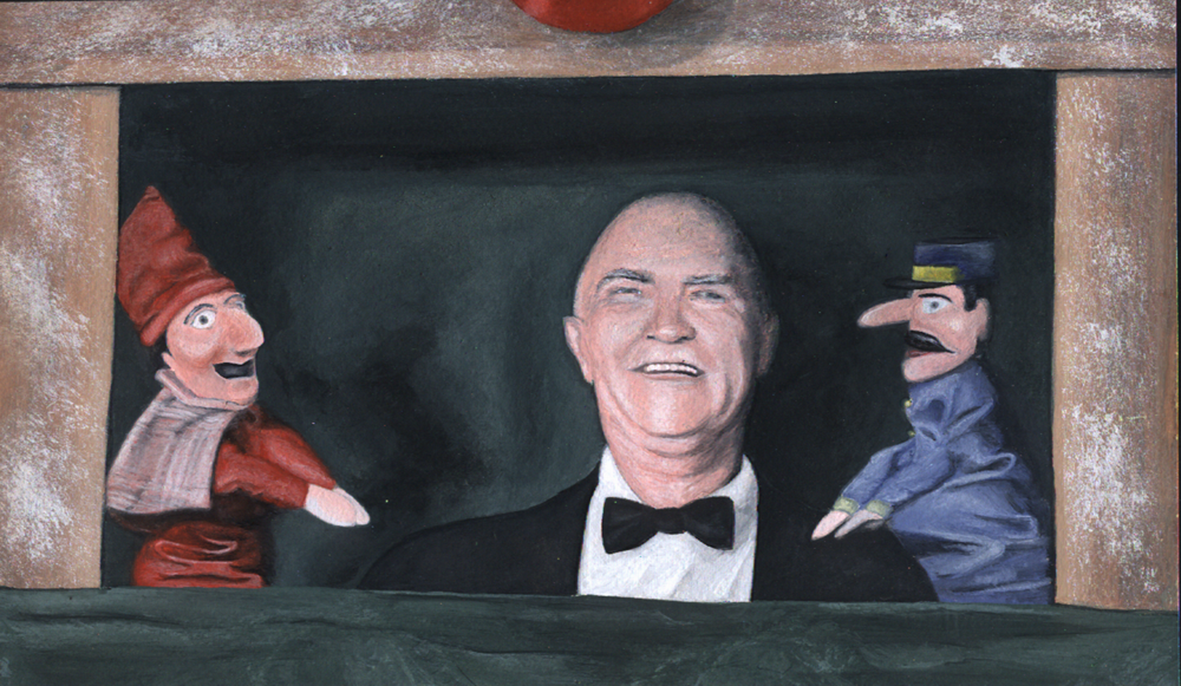
- Portrait painted by Jan Maliepaard
- Born: November 6, 1880; Rotterdam, Netherlands
- Died: January 2, 1960 (aged 79); Portland, Oregon, United States
- Occupations: Writer, illustrator
- Writing career
- Genre: Children's picture books
- Notable work: series of Pietje Bell novels

Chris van Abkoude (6 November 1880, Rotterdam – 2 January 1960, Portland, Oregon) was a Dutch writer and novelist of mostly children's books. He wrote the series of Pietje Bell novels from 1914 to 1936 and many books in between. He moved to the United States in 1916 and wrote all the Pietje Bell books in the United States, except for the first one, which he wrote in 1914 in Rotterdam. In 1923 Van Abkoude wrote the novel Kruimeltje (Little Crumb) and in 1999 the film Little Crumb was released. Before his writing career, Van Abkoude was a teacher; when he noticed the children did not like reading the children's books of the time, he wrote his own.

In the U.S., he anglicized his name to Charles Winters.
