= Black Book (film) =

2006 Dutch film by Paul Verhoeven

- Theatrical release poster
- Dutch: Zwartboek
- Directed by: Paul Verhoeven
- Screenplay by: Gerard Soeteman; Paul Verhoeven
- Story by: Gerard Soeteman
- Produced by: Jeroen Beker; San Fu Maltha; Frans van Gestel; Jens Meurer; Teun Hilte
- Starring: Carice van Houten; Sebastian Koch; Thom Hoffman; Halina Reijn
- Cinematography: Karl Walter Lindenlaub
- Edited by: Job ter Burg; James Herbert
- Music by: Anne Dudley
- Production companies: AVRO; Clockwork Pictures; ContentFilm International; Egoli Tossell Film; Fu Works; Motion Investment Group; Studio Babelsberg; VIP 4 Medienfonds
- Distributed by: A-Film Distribution (Netherlands); NFP Marketing & Distribution and Warner Bros. Pictures (Germany); Alternative Films (Belgium); Metro Tartan Distribution (United Kingdom)
- Release dates: 1 September 2006 (Venice); 14 September 2006 (Netherlands)
- Running time: 146 minutes
- Countries: Netherlands; Germany; Belgium; United Kingdom
- Languages: Dutch; German; English; Hebrew
- Budget: $21 million
- Box office: $27 million

Black Book (Dutch: Zwartboek) is a 2006 war drama thriller film co-written and directed by Paul Verhoeven. The film, credited as based on several true events and characters, stars Carice van Houten as a young Jewish woman in the Netherlands who becomes a spy for the resistance during World War II after tragedy befalls her in an encounter with the Nazis. The cast also features Sebastian Koch, Thom Hoffman and Halina Reijn.

A co-production of the Netherlands, Germany, Belgium, and the UK, it is the first film that Verhoeven made in his native Netherlands since The Fourth Man (1983). With a $21 million production budget, Black Book was the most expensive Dutch film ever made.

Black Book had its world premiere on 1 September 2006 at the 63rd Venice International Film Festival, where it competed for the Golden Lion. Upon its wide release in the Netherlands on 14 September, Black Book was well-received by film critics, who especially praised the performance of Van Houten. It went to gross $27 million worldwide, becoming the highest-grossing Dutch film of 2006. At the Netherlands Film Festival, Black Book won three Golden Calf awards, including Best Feature Film. It was nominated for the BAFTA Award for Best Film Not in the English Language, and was the Dutch submission for the Academy Award for Best Foreign Language Film, but was not nominated. In 2008, the Dutch public voted it the best Dutch film ever.

== Plot ==
In 1944, the house in which Dutch Jewish singer Rachel Stein is hiding is destroyed by an Allied bomber. She asks a sympathetic lawyer named Smaal to help her escape the German-occupied Netherlands to the liberated southern part of the country. Aided by a man named Van Gein, Rachel is reunited with her family and boards a boat with other refugees. Rachel alone survives when they are ambushed by German SS men.

Rachel adopting a non-Jewish alias, Ellis de Vries, and becomes involved with a resistance group in The Hague, under the leadership of Gerben Kuipers and working closely with a doctor, Hans Akkermans. When Kuipers's son is captured with other members of the Resistance, Ellis agrees to help by seducing local SD commander Hauptsturmführer Ludwig Müntze. During a party at SD headquarters, Ellis recognises Obersturmführer Günther Franken, Müntze's brutal deputy, as the officer who had overseen the massacre on the boat. She obtains a job at SD headquarters and falls in love with Müntze who accepts that she is a Jew.

Using a hidden microphone Ellis planted in Franken's office, the Resistance learns Van Gein is the traitor who betrayed Rachel, her family, and the other Jews. Against Kuipers's orders, Akkermans tries to abduct Van Gein to expose him but is killed in the attempt. Franken responds by ordering the execution of forty hostages, including the plotters. Müntze, realising the war is lost, countermands the order.

Müntze forces Ellis to tell him her story, providing him evidence that Franken was stealing from the murdered Jews. Müntze reports this to Franken's superior, Obergruppenführer Käutner, who inspects Franken's safe and finds no evidence of stolen valuables. Franken in turn tells Käutner that Müntze has been negotiating a truce with the resistance, and Müntze is condemned to death. Ellis agrees to participate in a mission to rescue the imprisoned resistance members only if they also free Müntze. The rescuers find the prisoners' cells filled with waiting German troops and only Akkermans and one other man manage to flee. Ellis is arrested and taken to Franken's office. Aware of the microphone, he stages a confrontation to make the listening Resistance members believe Ellis collaborated and betrayed the rescuers. Ronnie, a Dutch woman working at SD headquarters, helps Ellis and Müntze escape.

After the country is liberated by the Allies, Franken is killed by Akkermans, who takes the Jewish loot. Suspecting Smaal is the traitor, Müntze and Ellis return to confront him. Smaal states that the identity of the traitor is evidenced by his 'black book', in which he had detailed all his dealings with Jews. Smaal and his wife are killed by an unknown assailant. Müntze chases the assailant into the street, only to be recognised by the Dutch crowd and arrested by Canadian soldiers. The Dutch arrest Ellis as a collaborator but not before she grabs the black book.

Käutner has been retained by the Canadians to help keep order among the defeated German forces, and he convinces a Canadian colonel that under military law, the defeated German military retains the right to punish its own soldiers. Müntze, under a death warrant, is executed by a firing squad.

Ellis is humiliated and tortured by violent jailers before being rescued by Akkermans, now a colonel in the Dutch Army. Akkermans tell her he killed Franken and shows her the valuables stolen from Jewish victims. When informed about Müntze's fate, Ellis goes into shock and Akkermans administers a tranquilizer. Ellis, feeling dizzy, realized she's been given an overdose of insulin and survives by quickly eating a bar of chocolate. Realizing Akkermans is the traitor who collaborated with Franken and killed the Smaals, she jumps from a balcony and eludes his pursuit.

Ellis uses the black book to proves her innocence to the Canadians and former Resistance leader Gerben Kuipers. The book lists the Jews taken to Akkermans for medical help just prior to their murder. Ellis and Kuipers intercept Akkermans, fleeing in a coffin in a hearse with the stolen money, gold, and jewels. They screw down the coffin's secret air vents, drive to Hollands Diep where the original SS trap had been sprung and wait until Akkermans suffocates.

In Israel in 1956, Rachel, her husband and two children walk into Kibbutz Stein past a sign announcing it was funded with money recovered from Jews killed during the war. Rachel's tranquil family life is interrupted by distant explosions, an air raid siren, and Israeli soldiers deploying in front of the kibbutz.

== Cast ==
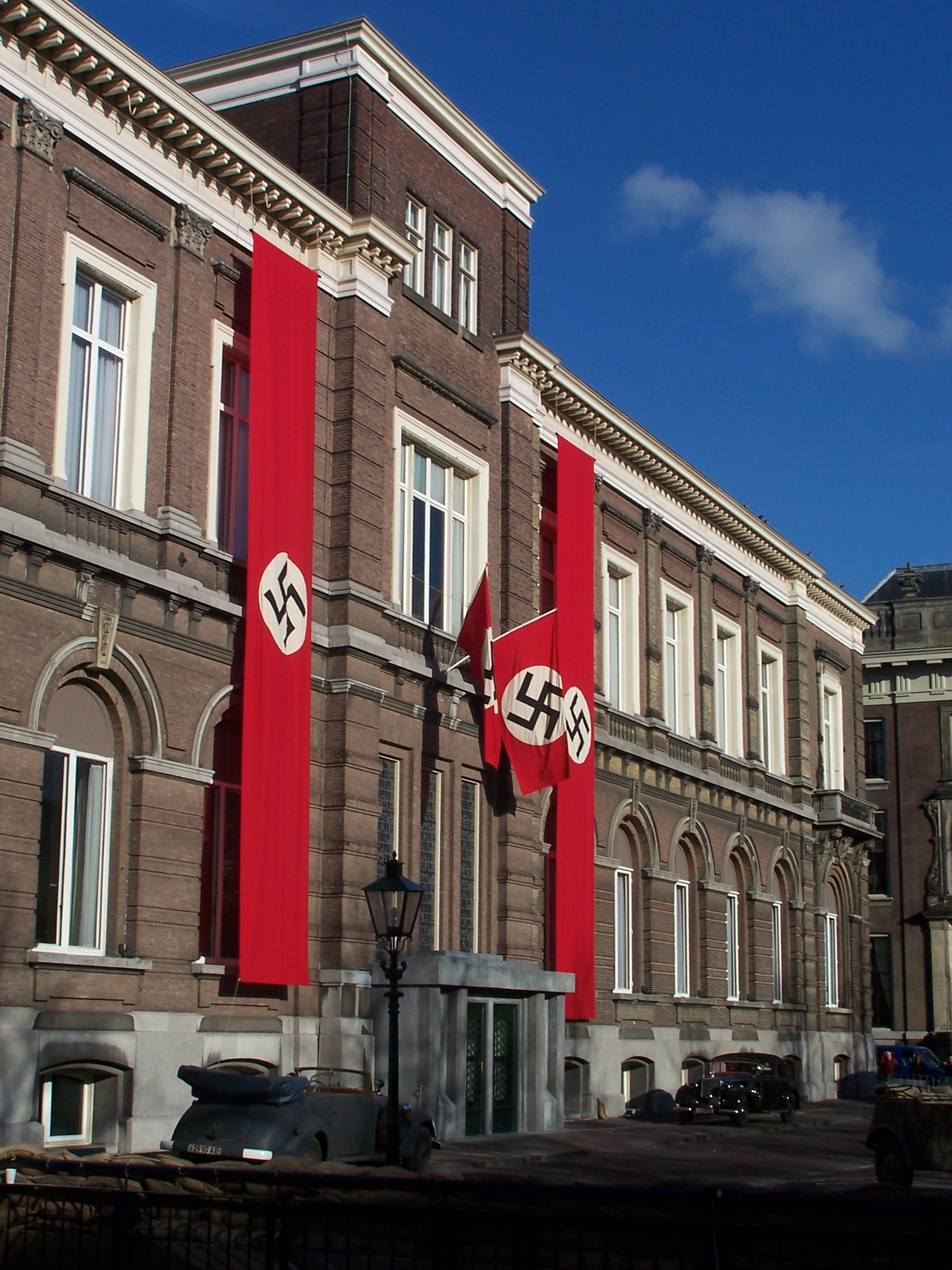
Film set of Black Book in The Hague in 2005

- Carice van Houten as Rachel Stein, alias Ellis de Vries
- Sebastian Koch as Ludwig Müntze (SS-Hauptsturmführer)
- Thom Hoffman as Hans Akkermans
- Halina Reijn as Ronnie
- Waldemar Kobus as Günther Franken (SS-Obersturmführer)
- Derek de Lint as Gerben Kuipers
- Christian Berkel as General (SS-Obergruppenführer) Käutner, superior of Günther Franken and Ludwig Müntze in the Sicherheitsdienst
- Dolf de Vries as Mr. Smaal, attorney who keeps the black book
- Peter Blok as Mr. Van Gein, policeman who betrays those trying to leave occupied territory
- Michiel Huisman as Rob, sailor who helps Rachel Stein
- Ronald Armbrust as Tim Kuipers, son of Gerben Kuipers, a communist, and a member of the resistance group
- Frank Lammers as Kees, member of the resistance group
- Matthias Schoenaerts as Joop, member of the resistance group
- Xander Straat as Maarten, member of the resistance group
- Johnny de Mol as Theodore, member of the resistance group
- Jacky Bar-Lev as the bus driver

== Production ==
=== Writing ===
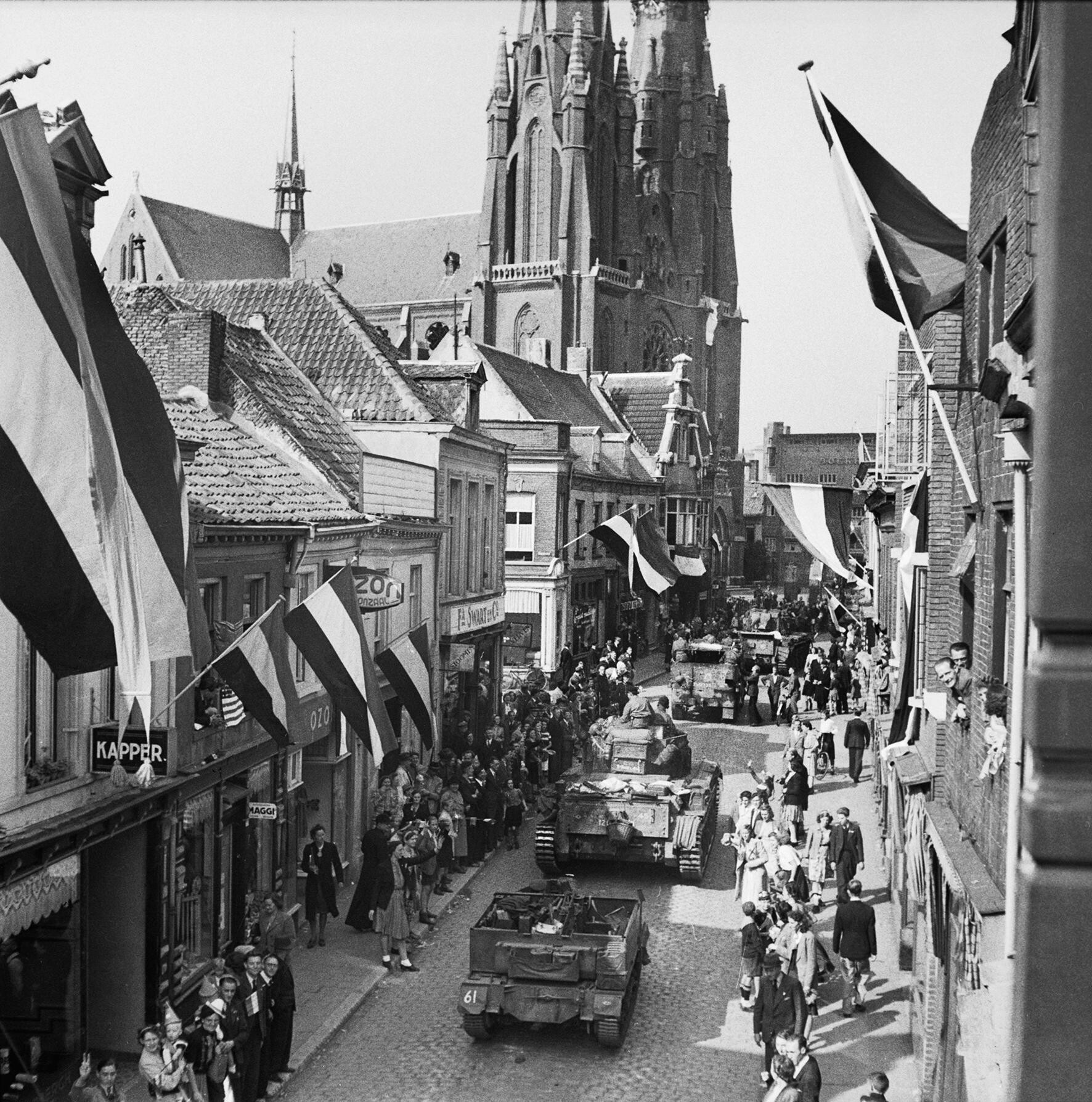
People in Eindhoven watching the allied forces enter the city following its liberation, similar to the depiction of the liberation in Black Book

After 20 years of filmmaking in the United States, Verhoeven returned to his homeland, the Netherlands, for the making of Black Book. The story was written by Verhoeven and screenwriter Gerard Soeteman, with whom he made successful films such as Turkish Delight (1973) and Soldier of Orange (1977). The two men had been working on the script for 15 years, but they solved their story problems in the early 2000s by changing the main character from male to female. According to Verhoeven, Black Book was born out of elements that did not fit in any of his earlier movies, and it can be seen as a supplement to his earlier film about World War II, Soldier of Orange.

Verhoeven has emphasised that the story does not show an obvious moral contrast between characters, for a theme of moral relativism:

In this movie, everything has a shade of grey. There are no people who are completely good and no people who are completely bad. It's like life. It's not very Hollywoodian.

Black Book is not a true story, unlike Soldier of Orange, but Verhoeven states that many of the events are true. As in the film, the German headquarters were in the Hague. In 1944 many Jews that tried to cross to liberated parts of the southern Netherlands were entrapped by Dutch policemen. As in the film, crossing attempts took place in the Biesbosch. Events are related to the life of Verhoeven, who was born in 1938 and grew up in the Hague during the Second World War. The execution of Müntze by German firing squad after the war had ended echoes the notorious May 1945 German deserter execution incident.

=== Financing ===
The initial estimate of the budget for making Black Book was €12,000,000. According to film producer Rob Houwer, who worked with Paul Verhoeven on previous films, it was not possible to get the job done for that amount of money. San Fu Maltha produced the film together with three other producers. He tried to economize on different parts such as the scenes in Israel, that could have been left out without changing the plot, but this was not negotiable for Paul Verhoeven.

Because of financing problems, the filming did not start as planned in 2004 but was delayed until August 2005. In this month it was announced that Black Book received about €2,000,000 support from the Netherlands Public Broadcasting, the CoBO Fund, and the Dutch Ministry of Education, Culture and Science. There were also several foreign investors, which made the film a Belgian, British, and German coproduction. With a final estimated budget of €18,000,000, the film was the most expensive Dutch film ever, at the time of its release.

In October 2006 twelve crew members and businessmen started a lawsuit in which they demanded the bankruptcy of Zwartboek Productie B.V., the legal entity founded for the film. Some of them had already been waiting for more than a year to get their money, in total tens of thousands of euros. Production company Fu Works settled the case and promised to pay the creditors.

=== Filming ===
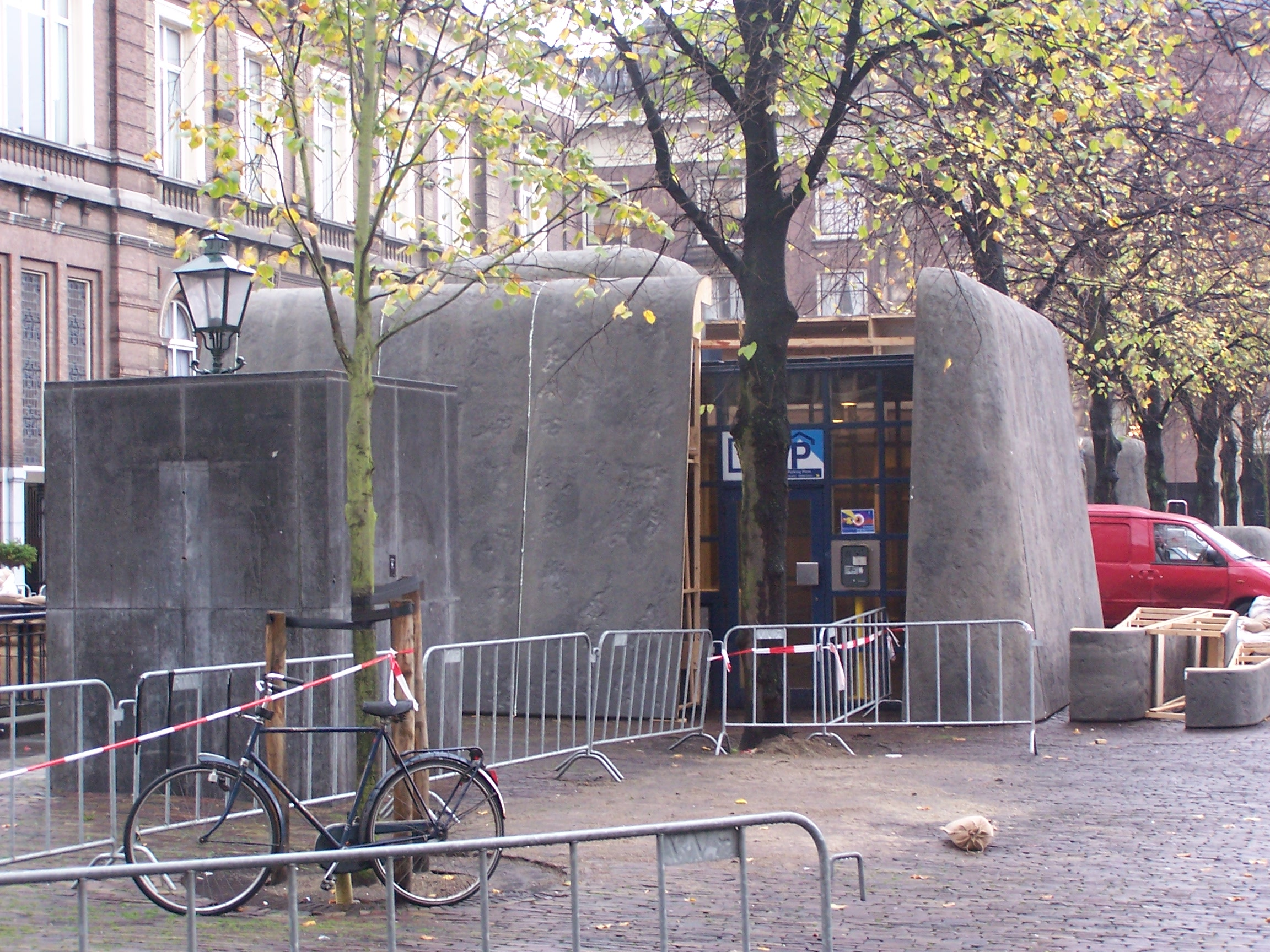
A 'bunker' is built around the entrance of an underground car park at the film set of Black Book.

The shooting of the film was delayed in 2004 due to financial problems and Paul Verhoeven's health problems. Because of the delay there was a lawsuit regarding lead actress Carice van Houten, who had agreed to act in a play. When van Houten was forced to return to the set, the theater company sued over the costly delay to their own production. The outcome of the lawsuit was that the production company had to pay €60,000 for her unavailability.

Karl Walter Lindenlaub served as the cinematographer. Black Book was the first European film he worked on in years. He joined the project as he thought the movie had "something to say" and viewed it as an opportunity to work with Verhoeven whose early work had entertained him. The film was shot in Super-35mm. Lindenlaub went for a "natural look" and was influenced by color photography taken in Germany during World War II with Agfa color stock, noting that they had a distinctive look. During his film studies he encountered films from the era such as Great Freedom No. 7 that left a strong impression on him. He showed Verhoeven and the other department heads the aforementioned film, whose colors became a "sort of template" for Black Book.

Principal photography took place from 24 August until 19 December 2005 on locations in the Netherlands, including Hardenberg, Giethoorn, the Hague, Delft and Dordrecht, and in Israel, by Hocus Focus Films. In the opening scene a real pre-war farm was blown up in the municipality of Hardenberg. The farm had already been declared uninhabitable and ready to be demolished. Some underwater explosions were filmed in a lake near Giethoorn. In the centre of The Hague they built bunkers to cover up modern day objects such as the entrance to an underground car park. The former chemistry faculty building of the Delft University of Technology was used to film prison scenes. Great attention to detail was paid in the film. Several stage props were reproduced from the 1940s, such as signs, posters and the black book itself. Furthermore, in one of the liberation scenes in The Hague, up to 1,200 extras appeared.

During shooting, the general public was able to see "making of" scenes on their mobile phones and on the internet.

== Historic background ==
The story of the Jewish woman Rachel Stein in Zwartboek is based on Dutch resistant fighter Esmée van Eeghen. Van Gein was based on the lives of Ans van Dijk and Andries Riphagen. Notary Smaal is based on the unsolved murder of 65-year-old lawyer H. de Boer in The Hague on 30 May 1945 (shortly after the liberation). During the war, de Boer appeared to have maintained good contacts with the German Sicherheitsdienst.

== Media based on the film ==
=== Novelisation ===
The screenplay by Paul Verhoeven and Gerard Soeteman was turned into a thriller novel by Dutch writer Laurens Abbink Spaink. The book was published in September 2006 by Uitgeverij Podium and contains photos and an afterword by Verhoeven and Soeteman. Spaink says about the book: "Black Book is a literary thriller. Its form is in between the typical American novelisation, only describing what the camera sees, and a literary novel. The novelisation adds something to the film. It gave Rachel Stein a past, memories and a house. In the film she did not have a personal space."

=== Soundtrack ===
The soundtrack was released on 2 October 2006 by Milan Records. The album contains four 1930s–1940s songs sung by Carice van Houten as she performed them as Rachel Stein in the film. Three are in German, one in English. The other tracks are written by Anne Dudley. The album was recorded in London and produced by Roger Dudley.

== Reception ==
=== Premieres and festivals ===
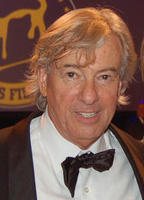
Director Paul Verhoeven at the Netherlands Film Festival in 2006, where Black Book received three Golden Calves

Black Book had its world premiere on 1 September 2006 in Venice, as part of the official selection of the Venice International Film Festival. Here it was nominated for a Golden Lion and won the Young Cinema Award for best international film. The film was also in the official selection of the 2006 Toronto Film Festival.

The Prince of Orange and his wife Princess Máxima attended the Dutch gala premiere of Black Book in the Hague on 12 September 2006. Other prominent guests at the premiere were mayor Wim Deetman, minister Hans Hoogervorst, minister Karla Peijs and state secretary Medy van der Laan.

The film was nominated for four Golden Calves at the Netherlands Film Festival in 2006. It won in three categories: the Golden Calf for Best Actress (Carice van Houten), for Best Director (Paul Verhoeven), and for Best Film (San Fu Maltha). Black Book was the most awarded film of the 2006 festival.

The United States premiere of Black Book was a gala screening at Palm Springs High School on 5 January 2007 during the Palm Springs International Film Festival. On 2 March 2007, Black Book was the opening film of the Miami International Film Festival.

The German premiere of Black Book was a gala screening at Zoo Palast in Berlin on 9 May 2007.

=== Critical reception ===
Most of the Dutch press were positive about the film. Dana Linssen writes in NRC Handelsblad: "In Black Book, Verhoeven does not focus on moral discourse but rather on human measure, and with the non-cynical approach of his female lead and of love he has given new colour to his work." Belinda van de Graaf in Trouw writes: "Breathless we run along burning farms, ugly resistance fighters, pretty kraut whores, spies, traitors, and because the story has to go on the coincidences pile up until it makes you laugh. When Carice van Houten screams 'Will it never stop, then!' it is almost kitsch, and not surprisingly already a classic film quote." She compares this film to Soldier of Orange and explains why this film is not a stereotypical war film: "The war adventure is no longer based on the male character of the type Rutger Hauer, with his machismo and testosterone, but the small fighter Carice van Houten". Literary critic Jessica Durlacher, daughter of an Auschwitz survivor, describes the film in Vrij Nederland with the following comparison: "The reality of 1940–1945 as portrayed in Black Book compared to reality is like the Eiffel Tower in Las Vegas compared to the original in Paris."

The international press wrote positively about the film and specifically about van Houten. The review aggregator Rotten Tomatoes reports a 77% "fresh" rating based on 158 reviews, with an average score of 7.1/10; the general consensus states: "A furious mix of sex, violence, and moral relativism, Black Book is shamelessly entertaining melodrama.". Metacritic reported the film had an average score of 71 out of 100, based on 34 reviews. According to Jason Solomons in The Observer: "Black Book is great fun, an old-fashioned war movie in parts, but with deep undercurrents about fugitive Jews, the Resistance, collaborators and the messy politics of war. This being Verhoeven, there's lots of sex and a scene in which the extremely attractive star (Carice van Houten) bleaches her pubic hair. That aside, hers is a star-making performance, putting even Scarlett [Johansson] in the shade." In the Frankfurter Allgemeine Zeitung Dirk Schümer says Carice van Houten is not only more beautiful, but also a better actress than Scarlett Johansson. Furthermore, he writes in his review: "Europe's Hollywood can actually be better than the original. With his basic instinct sharpened in California, Verhoeven demonstrates here the cinema as a medium of individual tragedy." Jacques Mandelbaum writes in his review in Le Monde: "This lesson about humanity and about fear can be situated in the wake of several rare masterpieces, that are solemnly confronted by this story"; he also compares Black Book with classics like The Great Dictator, To Be or Not to Be, and Monsieur Klein.

Richard Schickel of Time named the film one of the Top 10 Movies of 2007, ranking it at #5, calling it a "dark, richly mounted film". While Schickel saw the film as possibly "old-fashioned stylistically, and rather manipulative in its plotting", he also saw "something deeply satisfying in the way it works out the fates of its troubled, yet believable characters."

=== Commercial success ===
Before the film was released, the rights for distribution had been sold to distributors in 52 countries. According to the production company Fu Works these sales made the film Black Book commercially the most successful Dutch film production ever, at the time of its release.

Black Book received a Golden Film (100,000 tickets sold) within a record-breaking three days and a Platinum Film (400,000 tickets sold) within three weeks after the Dutch premiere. The film had its millionth visitor on 12 January 2007 and was the first film to receive a Diamond Film award.

Black Book had the highest box office gross for a Dutch film in 2006, coming third overall in 2006 in the Netherlands, after the American films Pirates of the Caribbean: Dead Man's Chest and The Da Vinci Code. As of 31 December 2006, the box office gross in the Netherlands was €6,953,118.

=== Top ten lists ===
The film appeared on several critics' top ten lists of the best films of 2007.

- 1st – Jonathan Rosenbaum, Film Comment
- 3rd – James Coleman, The 213
- 5th – James Berardinelli, ReelViews
- 5th – Richard Schickel, Time
- 8th – Nathan Lee, The Village Voice
- 9th – Scott Tobias, The A.V. Club

=== Awards and nominations ===
- Nomination Golden Lion (2006)
- Young Cinema Award for Best International Film (2006)
- Golden Film for 100,000 visitors in the Netherlands (2006)
- Platinum Film for 400,000 visitors in the Netherlands (2006)
- Golden Onion for Worst Actor (2006) for Johnny de Mol
- Nomination Golden Calf for Best Supporting Actress (2006) for Halina Reijn
- Golden Calf for Best Actress (2006) for Carice van Houten
- Golden Calf for Best Director (2006) for Paul Verhoeven
- Golden Calf for Best Film (2006) for San Fu Maltha
- Nomination London Film Critics' Circle Award for Foreign Language Film of the Year (2006)
- The Hague Public Award 2006 for contributing to a positive image of The Hague
- Nomination British Academy Film Award for Best Film Not in the English Language (2007)
- Dutch submission for the Academy Award nomination for Best Foreign Language Film (2007); was on the shortlist, but not among the five nominees
- Diamond Film for 1,000,000 visitors in the Netherlands (2007)
- Nomination Saturn Award for Best Actress for Carice van Houten (2008)
- Nomination Saturn Award for Best International Film (2008)

== See also ==
- List of Dutch submissions for the Academy Award for Best Foreign Language Film
- List of submissions to the 79th Academy Awards for Best Foreign Language Film
