= Costa! =

2001 Dutch film directed by Johan Nijenhuis

- Dutch DVD cover of Costa!
- Directed by: Johan Nijenhuis
- Written by: Wijo Koek; Johan Nijenhuis
- Produced by: San Fu Maltha; Johan Nijenhuis
- Starring: Daan Schuurmans; Georgina Verbaan; Katja Schuurman; Kurt Rogiers
- Cinematography: Maarten van Keller
- Edited by: Paul Bruijstens
- Music by: Martijn Schimmer
- Distributed by: A-Film Distribution
- Release date: 1 March 2001
- Running time: 90 minutes
- Country: Netherlands
- Language: Dutch

Costa! is a 2001 Dutch romantic comedy film directed by soap producer Johan Nijenhuis. It was the first movie that used several famous Dutch soap stars. Other movies that used soap actors, were Volle maan and Honeyz. The television series with the same title was based on the movie. It had the same cast members (with several expansions).

== Plot ==
Janet is a lonely girl who is forced to go on holidays with her sister Angela and her arrogant friends, Maureen and Joyce. When they arrive in Spain, Angela and her friends take off to the beach while Janet has to carry all the luggage to their apartment. That night, Angela, Joyce and Maureen decide to go out and end up in the popular nightclub Costa. Janet is left home alone, but eventually goes to Costa as well.

Afterwards, Rens walks Janet home, while singing some songs and doing some new dances. Rens soon finds out that Frida is unable to dance for a couple more weeks and she cannot join them during the MTV Dancing Awards. Rens takes a risk by asking Janet to dance with the group, despite the protest of the other dancers, Tommy and Björn. Janet agrees and she and Rens are practicing a lot in the following days.

That night, a parade is taking place on the streets of Salou. While watching the parade, Janet spots the car of Costa's rival nightclub, The Empire, where Rens now works. She, Angela, Joyce and Maureen visit The Empire, and realize the club is different from Costa—the dancers work with snakes and the women wear dominatrix-style outfits. Maureen eventually gets drunk by the end of the night. The girls lose sight of her and don't see her going to the back with one of the dancers. When Rens arrives, he sees Maureen lying on a table about to be raped by the dancer. Rens punches him. Maureen gets away safely while Rens is beaten up by the rest of the Empire dancers.

Meanwhile, Rens heads back to the streets of Salou, where he finds Tommy, Björn and Bart, Frida's younger brother. The four reunite and steal a car from The Empire dancers. The four head to the Empire building. When they arrive there, they get into a fight with the dancers of the Empire. The Costa's win eventually, leaving the Empires knocked out behind. Tommy, Björn and Bart go back to Costa, leaving Rens behind, who doesn't know what he has to do now. The dancers of Costa still have to perform for the MTV Dancing Award, but they don't have a convincing dance, causing the audience to yell at them. Janet arrives at the club, asking if she can join them. Rens arrives as well and the two meet at the back, where they are happy to see each other.

== Cast ==
- Georgina Verbaan as Janet
- Daan Schuurmans as Rens
- Katja Schuurman as Frida
- Kurt Rogiers as Tommy
- John Wijdenbosch as Björn
- Michiel Huisman as Bart
- Peggy Jane de Schepper as Angela
- Anniek Pheifer as Maureen
- Nadja Hüpscher as Joyce
- Patty Brard as Mother of Janet and Angela

== Production ==
The film was produced by San Fu Maltha, Johan Nijenhuis and Solo Films, co-owned by Joop van den Ende, co-founder of Endemol. It was a co-production with Dutch broadcaster, BNN. It was one of the first Dutch romantic comedy films aimed at 12 to 20 year-olds. The producers asked people to help them choose the cast via a website, and it became the largest group of well-known Dutch stars in a Dutch film. Both the film and the later TV show were located in Salou in Spain with filming also in nightclubs in Holland and Belgium.

== Release ==
In addition to the film, a top-selling book and CD, "Costa! Latin & Danceparty" accompanied the release.

=== Reception ===
The film knocked Hannibal off the top of the Dutch box office with a gross of 1.3 million guilders ($520,000). In its first 3 weeks it grossed $1.9 million, making it one of the top 10 highest-grossing Dutch films of all time.

== See also ==
- Costa!! (2022 film)
