= Sportsman of the Century =

2006 Dutch film

- Theatrical release poster
- Directed by: Mischa Alexander
- Written by: Mischa Alexander
- Produced by: Michael Eckelt; Emjay Rechsteiner; Paul Voorthuysen
- Starring: Ricky Koole; Jochum ten Haaf; Bastiaan Ragas
- Cinematography: Bert Pot
- Edited by: Charlotte van der Veen
- Music by: Zbigniew Preisner
- Production companies: PVPictures; Staccato Films
- Distributed by: Paramount Pictures (through United International Pictures)
- Release date: 6 April 2006
- Running time: 97 minutes
- Country: Netherlands
- Languages: Western Frisian; Dutch

Sportsman of the Century (Dutch: Sportman van de Eeuw) is a 2006 Dutch film written and directed by Mischa Alexander, starring Jochum ten Haaf, Ricky Koole and Bastiaan Ragas.

== Cast ==
- Jochum ten Haaf as Taeke
- Bastiaan Ragas as Rintje
- Ricky Koole as Tjitske
- Lou Landré as Hark Bohm
- Freark Smink as Pijlsma
- Stefan de Walle as Hylke Meinsma

== Release ==
=== Critical response ===
The film received negative reviews from critics.

=== Accolades ===
Accolades received by Little Tony
Year	Award	Category	Recipient(s)	Result	Ref.
2006	Netherlands Film Festival	Golden Onion for Worst Film	Mischa Alexander	Nominated	
2006	Netherlands Film Festival	Golden Onion for Worst Director	Mischa Alexander	Nominated	
