= Georgina Verbaan =

Dutch actress and singer

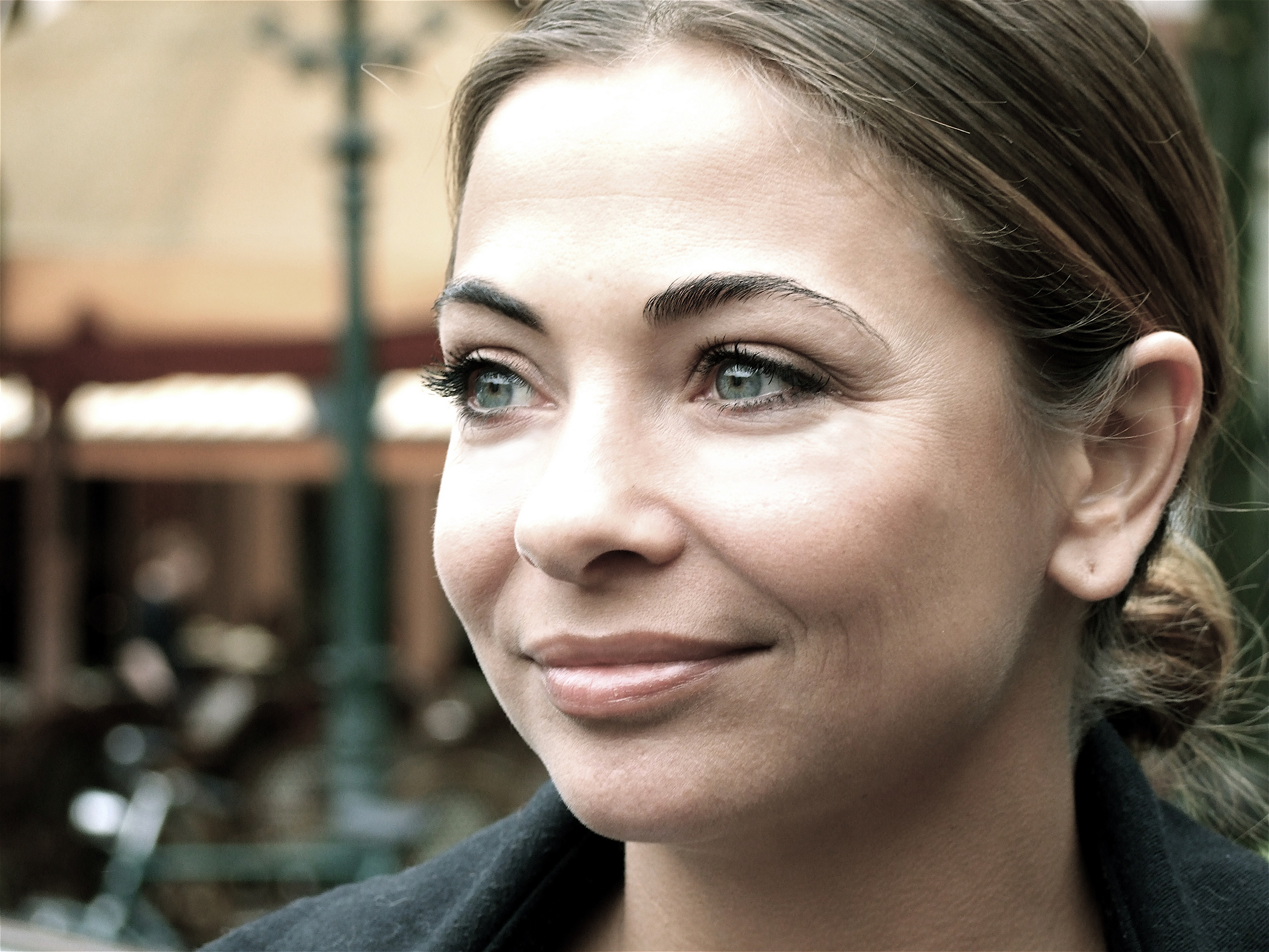
- Verbaan in 2008
- Born: 9 October 1979 (age 47); The Hague, Netherlands
- Occupations: Actress; singer
- Partner(s): Rob van de Wouw (2009-2013)
- Children: 1

Georgina Carolina Verbaan (born 9 October 1979) is a Dutch actress and singer. Verbaan is best known for her recurring role in soap opera Goede tijden, slechte tijden. She has also appeared in various Dutch films, including Costa!, Volle maan and Oogverblindend.

== Early life ==
Verbaan was born in The Hague, Netherlands and has an Indonesian father and a Dutch mother. She joined a musical group in her hometown, Zoetermeer, in 1990, at the age of 11. In 1992, Verbaan started attending a theatre school in The Hague. She graduated from mavo (high school) in Zoetermeer.

== Career ==
=== 1997-2003: Soap opera, music and film ===
Verbaan joined the cast of soap opera Goede tijden, slechte tijden in 1997, at the age of 18. She played the recurring role of Hedwig Harmsen from 1997 to 2000, growing increasingly popular and famous during her tenure on the show.

Verbaan left the show in 2000, seeking to pursue an acting career. She appeared in the Dutch film Costa! in 2001. Costa! was a nationwide commercial success, attracting over 200,000 visitors. Verbaan sang the film's theme song.

Verbaan had a cameo in English-language, Dutch film Soul Assassin in 2001. She made a major appearance in Dutch film Volle maan in 2002, but the film was a commercial and critical failure. Verbaan had the lead role in 2003 film Adrenaline.

In 2002, she released her debut studio album Sugar Spider that resulted in a number of radio hits including "Ritmo", "Yo quiero bailar" a cover of Sonia & Selena and "Denis" a cover of Blondie.

Verbaan received a Golden Onion (Dutch: Gouden Ui), the Dutch equivalent to a Golden Raspberry, for her performance in the 2005 film Joyride.

=== 2003-present: Television work and film ===
Verbaan starred in series like Dok12 and Floor Faber and had guest appearances several television shows and was a cast member of reality show Ranking the Stars. Later on, she received a recurring role in yet another television series, 't Schaep Met De 5 Pooten. She sang several songs for this series. For her role in this series, she also received a Beeld en Geluid Award ("Screen and Sound Award") for best actress.

In 2009, her role in the film Oogverblindend ("Dazzle"), directed by avantgarde filmmaker Cyrus Frisch, was critically acclaimed. The film was praised in Dutch press as "the most relevant Dutch film of the year".

She also had a minor, non-speaking role as the female bartender in Stanley Tucci's indie film "Blind Date" (2007), based on Theo Van Gogh's 1996 Dutch original. She played a major role in an episode of Dutch crime series "Van God Los" in 2011, playing a woman who kills her sister's friend after this friend has an affair with the woman's partner. For her role, Verbaan received critical acclaim and she was nominated for a Beeld & Geluid Award as best actress. Her episode of Van God Los (Spookbeeld) was also nominated for a Gouden Kalf.

Verbaan and Patrick Martens presented the television show Date Smakelijk.

In 2023 Verbaan had a lead role in the film Klem. Verbaan appeared in the 2025 season of the television show The Masked Singer.

=== Politics ===
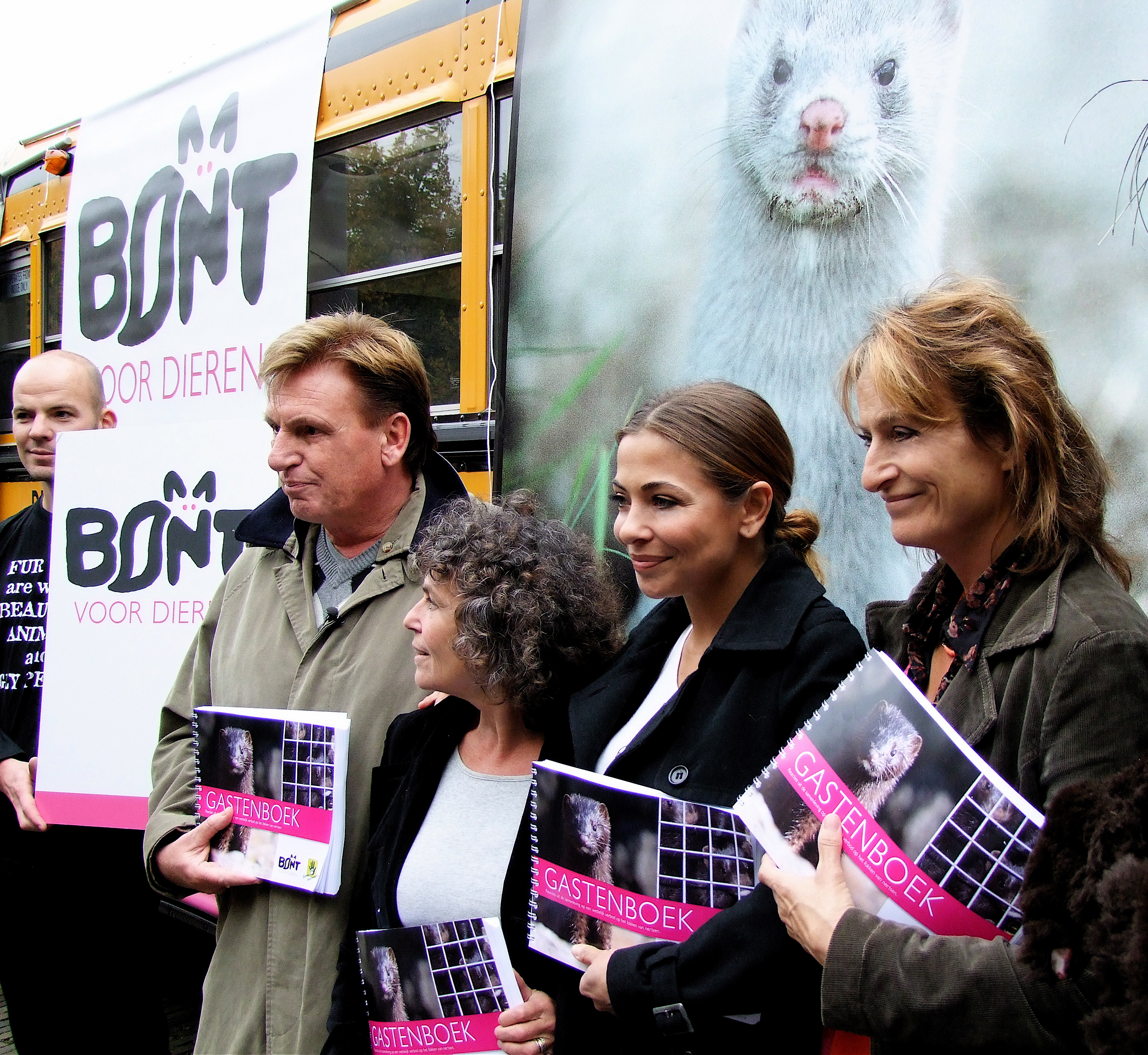
Verbaan (second from right) campaigning against fur in 2008.

In 2006, Verbaan, a vegetarian and anti-fur activist, began speaking in support of the Party for the Animals (PVDD). In the 2006 Dutch general election, she appeared on the PVDD's list, among other prominent Dutch celebrities, such as acclaimed writer Jan Wolkers. Verbaan received 1,337 votes, while the PVDD received enough votes to secure two seats in the House of Representatives. In 2016 Verbaan was again put on the election list of PVDD as a candidate.

In 2024 Verbaan joined other Dutch celebrities to participate in a series of videos by humanitarian organization Oxfam Novib calling for a permanent ceasefire to the Gaza war and humanitarian aid to Palestinians.

== Personal life ==
Verbaan became involved with trumpeter Rob van de Wouw in 2009. In April 2010, show business newscast RTL Boulevard reported Verbaan was pregnant with the couple's first child. Verbaan gave birth to a daughter, Odilia Lilibet van de Wouw, on 21 October 2010. In June 2013 Georgina and Rob separated.

== Discography ==
=== Albums ===
Year	Album	Chart peak (NED)
2002	Sugar Spider	70

=== Singles ===
Year	Album	Chart peak (NED)	Album
2000	"If You Want Me"	38	
2001	"Ritmo"	11	
2001	"C.O.S.T.A."	24	
2001	"Yo Quiero Bailar"	27	
2001	"This Christmas"	27	
2002	"Denis"	30	

== Filmography ==
=== Films ===
Year	Title	Role	Notes
1998	Goede tijden, slechte tijden: De reünie	Hedwig Harmsen	TV movie
1999	Enigma	Dash	TV movie
2001	Costa!	Janet	
2001	Soul Assassin	Reporter	First international movie
2002	Volle maan	Treesje	Full Moon Party (English title)
2003	Adrenaline	Freya	
2003	Pista!	Klaartje	TV movie
2004	Erik of het klein insectenboek	Mevrouw Mug	
2004	Amazones	Reneetje	
2004	06/05	Birgit Maas	
2005	Joyride	Chantal	
2005	Lulu	Zita	TV movie
2007	Blind Date	Cute Woman	
2008	Alibi	Andrea	
2009	Oogverblindend	Woman	
2009	Kikkerdril	Heleen	
2010	Gangsterboys		
2010	Flysk	Woman	TV movie
2011	Midzomernacht	Meike	
2011	Lotus	Elsa	
2012	Swchwrm	Koningin (Queen)	
2012	De Marathon	Anita	
2012	Alles is familie	Leonie	
2013	Frits & Franky	Birgit	
2013	Nooit te oud	Marleen Blok	TV movie
2013	Mannenharten	Susanne	
2015	The Surprise	Anne de Koning	
2016	Meester Kikker		
2023	Klem		
2024	De Mannenmaker		

=== TV series ===
Year	Title	Role	Notes
1997–00	Goede tijden, slechte tijden	Hedwig Harmsen	
2001–02	Dok 12	Rayna Pascal	
2001	Costa!	Janet	
2005	Medea	Vanessa	Miniseries
2006	Rauw!	Kiki	Improvisation comedy series
2006–07	't Schaep met de 5 Pooten	Lena Braams	Remake
2009	't Vrije Schaep	Lena Braams	Spin-off
2009	Floor Faber	Floor Faber	
2010–11	't Spaanse Schaep	Lena Braams	Spin-off
2011	Van God Los	Tilly	1 episode
2011–12	Mixed Up	Touba Blauwboer	
2012–13	't Schaep in Mokum	Lena Braams	Spin-off (post-production)
2017–20	Klem	Kitty van Mook	

=== Dubbing ===
Year	Title	Role	Notes
20??	Bratz	Jade	Serie
2006	Bratz: Forever Diamondz (film)	Jade	Movie
2006	Bratz: Genie Magic	Jade	Movie
2014	Pim & Pom: Het Grote Avontuur	Pim	Movie
2012	Winx Club 3D: Magical Adventure	Flora	Movie
2015	Winx Club: The Mystery of the Abyss	Flora	Movie

== Theater ==
=== Musicals ===
- 2000: De Geest van Laat maar Waaien (2000)

=== Stage ===
- 2005: Oogverblindend written and directed by Cyrus Frisch
- 2005: De Barones
- 2007: De Batavia written by Marcel Otten and directed by Ignace Cornelissen
- 2010: Late Avond Idealen directed by Sanne Vogel
- 2010: Ik hield van Hitler
