= Radamel =

Radamel is a given name. Notable people with the name include:

- Radamel Falcao (born 1986), Colombian footballer
- Radamel García (1957–2019), Colombian footballer, Falcao's father

== See also ==
- Radames
