= The Indian (film) =

2009 Dutch comedy film

- Theatrical release poster
- Directed by: Ineke Houtman
- Written by: Nynke Klompmaker
- Produced by: Burny Bos; Michiel de Rooij; Sabine Veenendaal
- Starring: Bastiaan Ragas; Hans Dagelet; Angelique de Bruijne; Matthias den Besten
- Cinematography: Sander Snoep
- Edited by: Elsbeth Kasteel
- Music by: Chrisnanne Wiegel; Melcher Meirmans; Merlijn Snitker
- Production companies: Bos Bros. Film-TV Productions; Lemming Film; VPRO
- Distributed by: A-Film Distribution
- Release date: 6 August 2009
- Country: Netherlands
- Language: Dutch
- Box office: $351,164

The Indian (Dutch: De Indiaan) is a 2009 Dutch comedy film directed by Ineke Houtman, starring Matthias den Besten and Bastiaan Ragas. The film is part of the Cinema Junior series.

The film was released on 6 August 2009 by A-Film Distribution and received positive reviews.

== Cast ==
- Matthias den Besten as Koos
- Bastiaan Ragas as Jaap
- Hans Dagelet as Opa Douwe
- Angelique de Bruijne as Tjitske
- Claire Lapadu as Lsa
- David Verbaas as Lilari
- Kees Boot as Badmeester

== Home media ==
The film was released on DVD on 26 November 2009 by A-Film Home Entertainment.
