= Michiel Huisman =

Dutch actor and musician (born 1981)

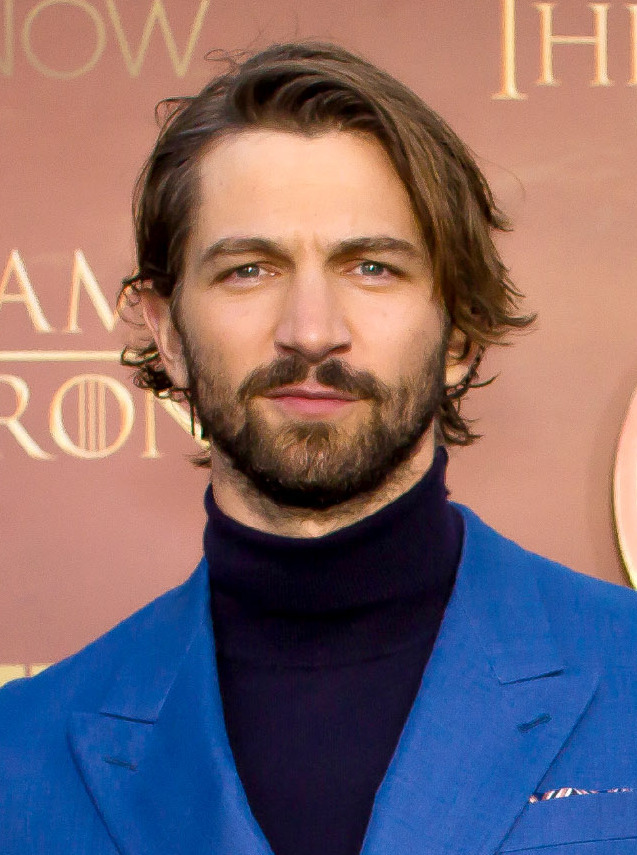
- Huisman in 2015
- Born: 18 July 1981 (age 45); Amstelveen, Netherlands
- Occupations: Actor, musician
- Years active: 1995–present
- Spouse: Tara Elders (m. 2008)
- Children: 1

Michiel Huisman (Dutch: [mɪˈxil ˈɦœy̯s.mɑn]; born 18 July 1981) is a Dutch actor, musician and singer-songwriter born in Amstelveen, recognized for his roles in Dutch and international film and television projects.

Huisman's music career began as the singer and guitarist for a Dutch band called Fontane, which released singles and was featured on movie soundtracks in the early 2000s. After the band split, he pursued a solo music career, releasing an album and singles.

His acting career started with roles in the Dutch soap opera Goede tijden, slechte tijden (1998). He later appeared in Dutch films including Costa! (2001), Phileine Says Sorry (2003) and Black Book (2006), and in the Dutch TV series De co-assistent (2007–10) and Bloedverwanten (2010).

Huisman's first international acting experience came in 2006, when he guest-starred in the British TV series Dalziel and Pascoe. Huisman played Sonny in HBO's Treme and replaced Ed Skrein as Daario Naharis in Game of Thrones, joining as a series regular. His filmography includes roles in films such as Wild (2014), The Ottoman Lieutenant (2017), The Guernsey Literary and Potato Peel Pie Society (2018), and the Discovery Channel's miniseries Harley and the Davidsons. He appeared in The Haunting of Hill House (2018), The Flight Attendant (2020) and in 2022, he starred in the black ops military series Echo 3.

== Personal life ==
Huisman is the brother of former professional football player Dustin Huisman. Huisman is fond of table tennis, which he has played since childhood. He was raised Jewish.

Huisman is married to Dutch actress Tara Elders, and they have a daughter who was born in 2007. The couple formerly lived in New Orleans, Louisiana, US; and now reside in New York City.

== Career ==
=== Music career ===
Huisman was singer and guitarist in the Dutch band Fontane, which he formed together with Roland van der Hoofd, Gilles Tuinder, Bas van Geldere, and Donny Griffioen. The band released the singles "1+1=2" (2001), "Slapeloos" (2002), and "Neem Me Mee" (2003). The first single was on the soundtrack of the film Costa! (2001) and the second was on the soundtrack of Full Moon Party (2002), both in which Huisman played a starring role. The band also recorded a version of Willeke Alberti's song "Telkens weer" for the soundtrack of the movie Love to Love (2003).

After two members left the band, Fontane split up and Huisman decided to pursue music on his own. Huisman released the singles "Deel Van Mij" (2005) and "Geef Je Over" (2006), and the album Luchtige Verhalen (2005) as a solo artist. Huisman said in interview about his solo career: "It doesn't feel like a new start, but as if I've started just now." and "It is personal and closerby. Also the sound of the album."

=== Acting career ===
Huisman began his acting career with a supporting role on Goede Tijden, Slechte Tijden – the longest-running soap opera on Dutch television – where he played Rover, a 14-year-old model who accuses his employers of engaging in child pornography. He was then cast in the made-for-TV films Suzy Q and Uitgesloten.

He played supporting roles in the Dutch films Costa! and Volle Maan, both of which were directed by Johan Nijenhuis and aimed at a teen-aged audience. At the same time, he also had a recurring role on the Dutch police series Spangen. Huisman moved into leading-man territory in 2003 with the film Phileine Says Sorry, which was an adaptation of Ronald Giphart's book of the same title. He also starred as medieval knight Floris in the film Floris, based on the Dutch TV series.

In the years that followed he played a leading role in the football comedy Johan, recurring guest roles in the comedy series Meiden van De Wit and the first season of the drama series Bloedverwanten, and the leading role in the medical drama series De Co-Assistent. He also played a small supporting role in the 2006 film Zwartboek by Paul Verhoeven, which became the most successful Dutch film of all time.

In 2006, Huisman made his first foray into the international acting world with a supporting role in an episode of the British TV series Dalziel and Pascoe. He followed this with a role as Ernest II, Duke of Saxe-Coburg and Gotha in The Young Victoria, and the BBC made-for-TV drama Margot in which he portrayed Rudolf Nureyev. He then joined the main cast of the HBO series Treme, as Sonny, a Dutch busker who plays keyboards and guitar. He was taught New Orleans piano by Davis Rogan. During his time on Treme, Huisman also played a small supporting role in the apocalyptic action film World War Z and started recurring as Liam McGuinnis on Nashville.

Huisman replaced English actor Ed Skrein in the role of Daario Naharis for the fourth season (2014) of Game of Thrones. Huisman was promoted to series regular for the fifth season (2015) of the series. Huisman also recurred on seasons 2 and 3 of Orphan Black, portraying Cal Morrison, a rugged outdoorsman who crosses paths with the clones.

In 2014, Huisman appeared in the Academy Award-nominated biographical drama film Wild and starred in the advertising campaign for Chanel No.5's The One That I Want, which was directed by Baz Luhrmann. In 2015, Huisman co-starred in the thriller The Invitation, and played the leading role in the fantasy romance film The Age of Adaline.

In 2016, Huisman was cast as the lead role in the war-drama The Ottoman Lieutenant which tells the story of a Turkish officer (Huisman) who falls in love with an idealistic American nurse, played by Hera Hilmar, during World War I. The film also stars Josh Hartnett and Ben Kingsley. The film was released for an Oscar-qualifying run in December 2016 before wide release in March 2017.

Also in 2016, Huisman played Walter Davidson in the Discovery Channel limited series Harley and the Davidsons which told the origin story of Harley-Davidson Inc. The three-part series premiered in September 2016 and gained reasonable reviews from critics and from Harley-Davidson themselves.

Huisman starred in the thriller film 2:22 which was released on 30 June 2017. That year, Huisman was cast as Sam, the male lead in the romantic drama Irreplaceable You. The film co-starred Gugu Mbatha-Raw as his childhood sweetheart, and later fiancée, who is diagnosed with terminal cancer, and Steve Coogan and Christopher Walken also appear. The film was released on 16 February 2018 on Netflix. Also in 2018, Huisman starred opposite Lily James as Dawsey Adams, the male lead in the romantic drama The Guernsey Literary and Potato Peel Pie Society, based on the 2008 novel of the same name.

In 2018, Huisman starred in the Netflix horror series The Haunting of Hill House, which is based on Shirley Jackson's 1959 novel of the same name. The 10-episode drama, released on 12 October 2018, is a modern re-imagining of the original story, now about a family of seven. Huisman plays Steven Crain, the oldest sibling, who becomes a published writer of supernatural books, including a memoir about his family's time living at Hill House. Mike Flanagan wrote, directed and executive-produced the series. In 2019, Huisman had a supporting role in the Netflix film The Red Sea Diving Resort, as an Israeli agent.

== Discography ==
Singles with Fontane

- "1+1=2" (2001)
- "Slapeloos" (2002)
- "Neem Me Mee" (2003)

Solo singles

- "Deel Van Mij" (2005)
- "Geef Je Over" (2006)

Solo albums

- Luchtige Verhalen (2005)

== Filmography ==
=== Film ===
Key
†	Denotes works that have not yet been released

Year	Title	Role	Notes
2001	Costa!	Bart	
2002	Exit	Renate's friend	Short film
2002	Full Moon Party	Bobbie	
2003	Phileine Says Sorry	Max	
2004	Floris	Floris	
2005	Johan	Johan Dros	
2006	Black Book	Rob	
2007	Funny Dewdrop	Orpheus	Short film
2009	Unmade Beds	X Ray Man	
2009	The Young Victoria	Prince Ernest	
2009	Winterland	Francis Young	
2010	First Mission	Wout	
2013	World War Z	Ellis	
2013	The Woman in the Dress	Tom	Short film
2014	Wild	Jonathan	
2015	The Invitation	David	
2015	The Age of Adaline	Ellis Jones	Nominated – Teen Choice Award for Choice Movie: Kiss (shared with Blake Lively)
2017	The Ottoman Lieutenant	İsmail Veli	
2017	2:22	Dylan Branson	
2017	Indian Horse	Father Gaston Leboutilier	
2018	Irreplaceable You	Sam	
2018	The Guernsey Literary and Potato Peel Pie Society	Dawsey Adams	
2018	State Like Sleep	Stefan Delvoe	
2019	The Red Sea Diving Resort	Jacob "Jake" Wolf	
2019	The Other Lamb	Shepherd	
2019	The Last Right	Daniel Murphy	
2021	Kate	Stephen	
2021	A Boy Called Christmas	Joel	
2023	Rebel Moon – Part One: A Child of Fire	Gunnar	
2024	Rebel Moon – Part Two: The Scargiver	Gunnar	

=== Television ===
Year	Title	Role	Notes
1995	Voor hete vuren		Episode: "Prettige feestdagen"
1998	Goede tijden, slechte tijden	Rover	
1998	Kees & Co	Errand Boy	Episode: "Sonja's trouwdag"
1999	Suzy Q	Palmer	Television film
1999–2002	Spangen	Pelle	4 episodes
2001	Dok 12	Frederik van Kemenade	Episode: "Geen lijk, geen dader"
2001	Costa!	Bart	10 episodes
2001	Uitgesloten	Coen	Television film
2005	Meiden van De Wit	Boudewijn Peuts	9 episodes
2006	Dalziel and Pascoe	Back-packer	Episode: "Wrong Place, Wrong Time: Part 1"
2006	't Schaep met de 5 pooten	Freddy	Episode: "Het zal je kind maar wezen"
2007–2010	De co-assistent	Hugo Biesterveld	Starring; 41 episodes
2009	Margot	Rudolph Nureyev	Television film
2010	Bloedverwanten	Martijn Zwager	12 episodes
2010–2013	Treme	Sonny	Starring; 35 episodes
2012–2014	Nashville	Liam McGuinnis	Recurring; 13 episodes
2013	The Sixth Gun	Drake Sinclair	Television film
2014–2015	Orphan Black	Cal Morrison	Recurring; 6 episodes
2014–2016	Game of Thrones	Daario Naharis	Starring (Season 5–6; 13 episodes); Nominated – Screen Actors Guild Award for Outstanding Performance by an Ensemble in a Drama Series (2016, 2017)
2016	Harley and the Davidsons	Walter Davidson	TV Mini-Series; 3 episodes
2018	The Haunting of Hill House	Steven Crain	Main role Nominated – Saturn Award for Best Supporting Actor in Streaming Presentation (2019)
2020	The Flight Attendant	Alex Sokolov	Main role Nominated – Screen Actors Guild Award for Outstanding Performance by an Ensemble in a Comedy Series (2021)
2021	Angela Black	Olivier Meyer	
2022–2023	Echo 3	Prince	Main role
2025	The Abandons	Xavier Roache	Recurring role
