= A-Film =

Independent film distributor

- Logo used from 2003–2015
- Formerly: A-Film Distribution (1999–2013)
- Type: Besloten vennootschap
- Industry: Film distribution
- Predecessors: Benelux Film Distributors
- Founded: 1999; 27 years ago
- Founders: San Fu Maltha; Pim Hermeling
- Defunct: September 15, 2015
- Fate: Bankruptcy
- Successor: Dutch FilmWorks
- Headquarters: Amsterdam, Netherlands
- Area served: Benelux
- Products: Motion pictures
- Number of employees: 20 (2015)
- Website: www.a-film.nl

A-Film Benelux B.V. (formerly known as A-Film Distribution) was an independent film distributor based in the Netherlands.

== History ==
A-Film Distribution was founded in November 1999 by film producers San Fu Maltha and Pim Hermeling. The company distributed mainstream and arthouse films in the Netherlands as well with local releases such as Costa! and Love is All. The company also distributed non-Dutch films such as Alexander, Lost in Translation, The Pianist and The Lord of the Rings trilogy. In 2003, A-Film, Cinéart, Frenetic Films, Haut Et Court and Lucky Red/EyeScreen created a jointly owned film acquisition firm named Indie Circle. A-Film left the circle in 2008.

In 2006, the company won Golden Calf awards for Waiter, Black Book, Night Ride and Bonkers. That same year, A-Film started to distribute its films in Belgium.

San Fu Maltha left A-Film In February 2006. In 2008, Pim Hermeling left A-Film as well.

In May 2013, the company merged with Benelux Film Distributors to form A-Film Benelux.

On 14 September 2015, the company filed an automatic stay; it filed for bankruptcy the next day. Dutch FilmWorks bought the distribution rights to much of the company's film and television back catalogue on 3 November, while rights to some films such as Magic Mike, Oculus and Under the Skin were acquired by Splendid Medien, the then-upcoming film High-Rise was acquired by Imagine Film Distribution, and multiple local titles reverted to their producers.

== Filmography ==
=== Dutch films ===
Release date	Title	Notes
2000s
24 February 2000	Rent a Friend	with Jordaan Film, Fu Works and BNN
11 May 2000	Jacky	with Motel Films and VPRO
21 December 2000	The Sea That Thinks	with Studio Nieuwe Gronden and Theorema Films
1 March 2001	Costa!	
12 April 2001	Îles flottantes	with Circe Films, Motel Films and VPRO
3 May 2001	AmnesiA	with Motel Films and VPRO
22 August 2001	Soul Assassin	with Parabolic Pictures and Rebel Entertainment
21 February 2002	Snapshots	with Overseas Filmgroup and Cadenza Films
30 September 2002	Swingers	
13 March 2003	SuperTex	
12 June 2003	Resistance	with First Floor Features
9 October 2003	Phileine Says Sorry	
23 October 2003	Cloaca	with IdtV Film and AVRO
4 December 2003	Grimm	with Graniet Film
28 April 2004	In Orange	with Motel Films, Fu Works, Clockwork Pictures and AVRO
2 September 2004	The Preacher	with Theorema Films and VARA
30 September 2004	Simon	with Spaghetti Film and VPRO
14 October 2004	Snowfever	with Nijenhuis & de Levita Film & TV
3 February 2005	Too Fat Too Furious	with Fu Works Productions, Clockwork Pictures, Thura Film and Motel Films
14 July 2005	Black Swans	with M+B Film
28 September 2005	Life!	with IdTV Film and NPS
15 October 2005	Bonkers	with Lemming Film and VPRO
10 November 2005	Deep	with IJswater Films and VPRO
9 March 2006	A Thousand Kisses	with IDTV Film
27 April 2006	Don	with Lemming Film, Egmond Film & Television and Katholieke Radio Omroep
28 September 2006	Black Book	with Clockwork Pictures, ContentFilm International, Egoli Tossell Film, Fu Works, Motion Investment Group, Studio Babelsberg, VIP 4 Medienfonds and AVRO
28 September 2006	Waiter	with Graniet Film and VARA
11 October 2007	Love is All	with Motel Films, Fu Works and VARA
25 October 2007	Nadine	with Rocketta Film, Serendipity Films and Filbox produções
25 October 2007	Captain Rob and the Secret of Professor Lupardi	with Shooting Star Filmcompany, Screenpartners B.V. and Katholieke Radio Omroep
6 March 2008	Tiramisu	with Motel Films and VARA
25 September 2008	In Real Life	with Motel Films, Fu Works and IDTV Film
2 October 2008	Katia's Sister	with Keyman Film and NPS
15 October 2008	Bride Flight	with IDTV Film
23 October 2008	Vox populi	with Spaghetti Film and VPRO
11 February 2009	Frogs & Toads	with Lemming Film, Bos Bros. Film-TV Productions and Katholieke Radio Omroep
19 March 2009	Bollywood Hero	with IDTV Film
7 May 2009	The Last Days of Emma Blank	with Graniet Film and VARA
6 August 2009	The Indian	with Bos Bros. Film-TV Productions, Lemming Film and Katholieke Radio Omroep
2010s
8 April 2010	Joy	with IDTV Film
12 August 2010	Shocking Blue	with Waterland Films and VPRO
19 August 2010	Sterke verhalen	with Lagestee Film
11 November 2010	Sint	with Tom de Mol Productions, Parachute Pictures and RTL Entertainment
27 January 2011	Sonny Boy	with Shooting Star Filmcompany and Katholieke Radio Omroep
31 March 2011	Black Butterflies	with IDTV Film and Cool Beans
22 September 2011	Isabelle	with IDTV Film, NCRV and Samsa Film
6 October 2011	Body Language	with Johan Nijenhuis & Co, Flinck Film, Launch Works and RTL Entertainment
26 October 2011	The Heineken Kidnapping	with IDTV Film and VARA
16 February 2012	Zombibi	with Talent United Film & TV, Launch Works and RTL Entertainment
21 November 2012	Family Way	with Topkapi Films and VARA
21 February 2013	The Resurrection of a Bastard	with Topkapi Films, Menuet and VPRO
7 November 2013	The Dinner	with Eyeworks, Inspire Pictures and RTL Entertainment
5 December 2013	Bro's Before Ho's	with Eyeworks, Inspire Pictures and RTL Entertainment
30 January 2014	Tuscan Wedding	
9 April 2014	Pim & Pom: The Big Adventure	
18 September 2014	Goltzius and the Pelican Company	
24 September 2014	Reckless	with Topkapi Films and BNN
8 October 2014	Triple Trouble: Animal Sinterklaas	
6 November 2014	Gift from the Heart	with Eyeworks, RTL Entertainment, Inspire Pictures and Living Stone
29 January 2015	Michiel de Ruyter	with Farmhouse Film & TV
15 February 2015	Boy 7	with Lemming Film, Proton Cinema, and A Private View
2 April 2015	Blood, Sweat & Tears	with Lemming Film, A Private View and AVROTROS
21 May 2015	The Surprise	

=== Non-Dutch films ===
==== 1999 ====
- Relax...It's Just Sex (16/12/99)

=== 2000s ===
==== 2000 ====
- All About My Mother (02/03/00)
- Baise-moi (16/11/00)
- Chicken Run (14/09/00)
- Cuba Feliz (05/10/00)
- Deep in the Woods (29/11/00)
- Drop Dead Gorgeous (08/06/00)
- Flawless (22/06/00)
- Ghost Dog: The Way of the Samurai (27/04/00)
- The Irrefutable Truth about Demons (13/07/00)
- Une liaison pornographique (07/09/00)
- Lucky and Zorba (05/10/00)
- Luna Papa (13/07/00)
- Magnolia (23/03/00)
- The Million Dollar Hotel (18/05/00)
- Ratcatcher (27/04/00)
- Rosetta (24/02/00)
- Rosie (17/02/00)
- Saving Grace (07/09/00)
- Season's Beatings (21/12/00)
- Topsy-Turvy (15/06/00)
- Vatel (27/07/00)
- The Vertical Ray of the Sun (29/11/00)
- The Widow of Saint-Pierre (14/12/00)
- The Wisdom of Crocodiles (07/07/00)

==== 2001 ====
- Bloody Angels (11/01/01)
- Ali Zaoua (11/01/01)
- Apocalypse Now Redux (18/10/01)
- Bread and Roses (12/04/01)
- Brother (23/05/01)
- The Filth and the Fury (06/09/01)
- Girlfight (02/08/01)
- The Golden Bowl (25/01/01)
- Harrison's Flowers (14/06/01)
- Harry, He's Here to Help (07/06/01)
- The Hole (26/07/01)
- Intimacy (12/07/01)
- The Lord of the Rings: The Fellowship of the Ring (20/11/01)
- Lumumba (31/05/01)
- Malèna (26/07/01)
- The Old Man Who Read Love Stories (08/11/01)
- Brotherhood of the Wolf (03/05/01)
- Pauline and Paulette (22/11/01)
- Taxi 2 (18/02/01)
- Thomas in Love (17/05/01)
- Yamakasi (02/08/01)

==== 2002 ====
- The Abduction Club (29/08/02)
- Asterix & Obelix: Mission Cleopatra (21/03/02)
- Avalon (19/09/02)
- Bangkok Dangerous (17/01/02)
- Belphegor, Phantom of the Louvre (14/03/02)
- Bend It Like Beckham (30/10/02)
- Bowling for Columbine (05/12/02)
- The Curse of the Jade Scorpion (16/05/02)
- Donnie Darko (20/06/02)
- Time Out (05/09/02)
- Félix et Lola (24/01/02)
- The Gleaners and I (23/05/02)
- Gosford Park (07/03/02)
- Talk to Her (26/09/02)
- Hedwig and the Angry Inch (14/03/02)
- The Girl from Paris (18/04/02)
- Human Nature (30/05/02)
- Safe Conduct (25/07/02)
- The Milk of Human Kindness (30/05/02)
- Liam (10/01/02)
- The Lord of the Rings: The Two Towers (18/12/02)
- Sex and Lucia (15/08/02)
- Marie-Jo and Her Two Lovers (21/11/02)
- Mulholland Drive (28/11/02)
- The Navigators (04/04/02)
- The Nest (18/07/02)
- Winged Migration (18/04/02)
- The Pianist (28/11/02)
- The Race (07/11/02)
- Sisters (11/04/02)
- Sexy Boys (21/11/02)
- Thunderpants (26/09/02)
- Le Vélo de Ghislain Lambert (13/06/02)
- Wasabi (14/11/02)

==== 2003 ====
- Any Way the Wind Blows (02/10/03)
- Bloody Sunday (20/01/03)
- Darkness (08/05/03)
- Jet Lag (03/04/03)
- Dogville (28/08/03)
- Dolls (10/04/03)
- Elf (18/12/03)
- Open Hearts (20/02/03)
- Fanfan la Tulipe (16/10/03)
- Les Femmes... ou les enfants d'abord... (13/03/03)
- The Flower of Evil (07/08/03)
- The Eye (26/06/03)
- Together (31/06/03)
- The Man on the Train (10/07/03)
- Love Me If You Dare (20/03/03)
- Ken Park (03/04/03)
- Lantana (19/06/03)
- The Lord of the Rings: The Return of the King (17/12/03)
- Lucky Break (18/09/03)
- Max (08/05/03)
- My Life Without Me (02/10/03)
- The Mystery of the Yellow Room (06/11/03)
- Rabbit-Proof Fence (22/05/03)
- Unknown Pleasures (13/11/03)
- The Suit (21/08/03)
- Fear and Trembling (11/09/03)
- Sweet Sixteen (08/05/03)
- Taxi 3 (31/07/03)
- On the Run (12/06/03)
- An Amazing Couple (10/07/03)
- After the Life (26/06/03)
- The Weight of Water (27/02/03)
- Wilbur Wants to Kill Himself (13/11/03)
- Divine Intervention (30/01/03)

==== 2004 ====
- 18 Ans après (22/07/04)
- Alexander (23/12/04)
- Anything Else (20/05/04)
- Bienvenue au Gîte (09/07/04)
- Spring, Summer, Fall, Winter... and Spring (23/03/04)
- The Chorus (15/07/04)
- Look at Me (11/11/04)
- Intimate Strangers (17/06/04)
- Deep Blue (20/05/04)
- Two Brothers (08/07/04)
- The Motorcycle Diaries (25/11/04)
- The Dreamers (01/04/04)
- Elephant (11/03/04)
- Eternal Sunshine of the Spotless Mind (16/09/04)
- Ae Fond Kiss ... (07/10/04)
- Girl with a Pearl Earring (15/04/04)
- The Gospel of John (13/05/04)
- In the Cut (12/02/04)
- Lost in Translation (12/02/04)
- My Wife Is an Actress (08/07/04)
- Bad Education (26/08/04)
- Mambo Italiano (29/01/04)
- Osama (08/04/04)
- Not on the Lips (24/06/04)
- The Passion of the Christ (01/04/04)
- Crimson Rivers II: Angels of the Apocalypse (17/06/04)
- RRRrrrr!!! (01/07/04)
- Stage Beauty (02/12/04)
- Super Size Me (12/08/04)
- Ruby & Quentin (25/03/04)
- Take My Eyes (08/06/04)
- Touching the Void (06/05/04)
- Downfall (04/11/04)
- The Alzheimer Case (15/04/04)

==== 2005 ====
- As It Is in Heaven (11/08/05)
- The Beautiful Country (09/06/05)
- Pride & Prejudice: A Latter-Day Comedy (17/02/05)
- Broken Flowers (24/11/05)
- Brothers (17/03/05)
- The Constant Gardener (17/11/05)
- The Axe (15/12/05)
- Dear Wendy (19/05/05)
- Don't Come Knocking (22/09/05)
- Electric Shadows (07/04/05)
- Enduring Love (24/03/05)
- Genesis (13/01/05)
- Grizzly Man (08/12/05)
- Hawaii, Oslo (30/06/05)
- It's All Gone Pete Tong (16/06/05)
- Last Days (25/08/05)
- The Life and Death of Peter Sellers (20/01/05)
- Manderlay (01/09/05)
- The Sea Inside (27/01/05)
- Merry Christmas (01/12/05)
- Million Dollar Baby (24/02/05)
- Millions (07/07/05)
- A Less Bad World (14/07/05)
- My Summer of Love (21/04/05)
- Oliver Twist (27/10/05)
- Omagh (05/05/05)
- P.S. (02/06/05)
- Pelicanman (15/12/05)
- She Hate Me (28/07/05)
- Turtles Can Fly (17/02/05)
- Undertow (18/08/05)
- Vera Drake (24/02/05)
- We Don't Live Here Anymore (31/03/05)
- Wedding Crashers (25/08/05)

==== 2006 ====
- After the Wedding (16/11/06)
- Someone Else's Happiness (06/07/06)
- Avenge But One of My Two Eyes (04/05/06)
- Breakfast on Pluto (04/05/06)
- Brokeback Mountain (16/02/06)
- C.R.A.Z.Y. (07/06/06)
- The Descent (02/02/06)
- Fragile (17/08/06)
- Gabrielle (25/05/06)
- Hard Candy (13/07/06)
- Iron Island (16/11/06)
- A Little Trip to Heaven (11/05/06)
- Marie Antoinette (18/06/06)
- Match Point (19/01/06)
- Mrs Henderson Presents (12/01/06)
- On a Clear Day (31/01/06)
- Opal Dream (13/04/06)
- Percy, Buffalo Bill och jag (16/02/06)
- The Queen (30/11/06)
- Requiem (05/10/06)
- The Road to Guantánamo (01/06/06)
- Romance & Cigarettes (30/03/06)
- Romanzo Criminale (17/08/06)
- The Science of Sleep (23/11/06)
- Scoop (19/10/06)
- Shooting Dogs (06/04/06)
- Shortbus (26/10/06)
- Snow Cake (21/12/06)
- Terkel in Trouble (06/07/06)
- Thank You for Smoking (09/11/06)
- This Film Is Not Yet Rated (07/12/06)
- Tideland (30/03/06)
- The Tiger and the Snow (13/04/06)
- Transamerica (20/04/06)
- Heading South (15/06/06)
- Volver (24/08/06)
- The White Planet (07/12/06)
- The Wind That Shakes the Barley (10/08/06)

==== 2007 ====
- Apocalypto (11/01/07)
- Dark Blue Almost Black (17/05/07)
- Bamako (08/02/07)
- Becoming Jane (16/08/07)
- Bled Number One (15/02/07)
- The Boss of It All (03/05/07)
- Candy (18/01/07)
- The Chinese Botanist's Daughters (11/01/07)
- Chronicle of an Escape (26/07/07)
- Dry Season (17/05/07)
- Death of a President (19/07/07)
- Death Proof (07/06/07)
- The Diving Bell and the Butterfly (13/09/07)
- Hunting and Gathering (19/07/07)
- Ex Drummer (12/04/07)
- Exiled (31/05/07)
- Goodbye Bafana (06/09/07)
- Goya's Ghosts (12/04/07)
- Gypsy Caravan (23/08/07)
- Half Nelson (20/09/07)
- The Host (26/07/07)
- Inland Empire (05/04/07)
- Interview (10/05/07)
- Jesus Camp (07/06/07)
- Little Children (25/01/07)
- Manual of Love (22/02/07)
- Molière (02/08/07)
- Mother of Mine (15/03/07)
- Private Property (05/04/07)
- Golden Door (24/05/07)
- Offside (22/03/07)
- Paris, je t'aime (11/01/07)
- Planet Terror (16/08/07)
- A Prairie Home Companion (08/02/07)
- Red Road (01/02/07)
- Shut Up and Sing (29/03/07)
- Sicko (22/11/07)
- Sketches of Frank Gehry (25/01/07)
- A Soap (18/01/07)
- Sounds of Sand (12/07/07)
- The Missing Star (09/08/07)
- Still Life (21/06/07)
- Tuya's Marriage (06/12/07)
- Venus (14/06/07)
- The Year My Parents Went on Vacation (13/12/07)
- Zidane: A 21st Century Portrait (09/08/07)

==== 2008 ====
- Alexandra (13/03/08)
- And When Did You Last See Your Father? (13/11/08)
- Asterix at the Olympic Games (14/02/08)
- The Edge of Heaven (07/02/08)
- Away from Her (10/01/08)
- The Baader Meinhof Complex (20/11/08)
- Be Kind Rewind (15/05/08)
- Before the Devil Knows You're Dead (03/04/08)
- Blind Date (18/09/08)
- Breath (10/07/08)
- Brideshead Revisited (19/09/08)
- Chaotic Ana (05/06/08)
- Caramel (17/01/08)
- Cassandra's Dream (17/04/08)
- Closing the Ring (12/06/08)
- Summer Hours (26/06/08)
- I'm Not There (13/03/08)
- Into the Wild (24/04/08)
- It's a Free World... (10/04/08)
- Lars and the Real Girl (27/03/08)
- Love in the Time of Cholera (21/02/08)
- Lust, Caution (24/01/08)
- Married Life (31/07/08)
- Mataharis (07/08/08)
- The Midnight Meat Train (21/08/08)
- The Orphanage (22/05/08)
- Paranoid Park (28/02/08)
- Persepolis (28/02/08)
- Religulous (11/12/08)
- Savage Grace (14/08/08)
- This Is England (24/07/08)
- Unfinished Sky (31/01/08)

==== 2009 ====
- 9 (09/09/09)
- A Woman in Berlin (15/01/09)
- Anvil! The Story of Anvil (31/08/09)
- Away We Go (13/08/09)
- Brothers (10/12/09)
- The Brothers Bloom (28/05/09)
- The Good Life (21/05/09)
- Captain Abu Raed (08/01/09)
- Disgrace (04/06/09)
- Easy Virtue (04/06/09)
- Effi Briest (25/06/09)
- Frozen River (05/02/09)
- Genova (09/07/09)
- Hamlet 2 (08/01/09)
- Heaven's Heart (19/02/09)
- Love Happens (05/11/09)
- Mammoth (23/04/09)
- Milk (22/01/09)
- Moon (15/10/09)
- Public Enemy Number One (Part One) (15/01/09)
- Public Enemy Number One (Part Two) (19/02/09)
- Rudo y Cursi (16/07/09)
- Shrink (03/09/09)
- Tokyo Sonata (12/03/09)

=== 2010s ===
==== 2010 ====
- Centurion (27/05/10)
- The Crazies (22/05/10)
- Creation (07/01/10)
- Dear John (11/03/10)
- An Education (11/02/10)
- Harry Brown (25/02/10)
- Kick-Ass (15/04/10)
- The Kids Are All Right (02/12/10)
- Killers (03/06/10)
- Life During Wartime (27/05/10)
- Mother (24/06/10)
- Nowhere Boy (01/04/10)
- Piranha 3D (02/09/10)
- The Spy Next Door (04/02/10)
- Triangle (21/01/10)
- Yo, también (13/05/10)

==== 2011 ====
- Alpha and Omega (02/02/11)
- Biutiful (03/02/11)
- The Devil's Double (08/09/11)
- The Fighter (24/03/11)
- The First Grader (18/08/11)
- Howl (26/05/11)
- Immortals (10/11/11)
- Jane Eyre (29/09/11)
- Let Me In (13/01/11)
- Limitless (07/04/11)
- Miral (31/03/11)
- Monsters (28/04/11)
- The Skin I Live In (17/11/11)
- Season of the Witch (10/02/11)
- Somewhere (14/04/11)
- The Man Who Will Come (21/07/11)

==== 2012 ====
- 7 Days in Havana (19/07/12)
- Act of Valor (10/05/12)
- Barbara (13/09/12)
- Beasts of the Southern Wild (18/10/12)
- My Way (02/08/12)
- Where Do We Go Now? (10/05/12)
- Le Havre (02/02/12)
- Haywire (29/03/12)
- I Wish (26/04/12)
- Magic Mike (12/07/12)
- A Monster in Paris (20/06/12)
- The Raid (05/07/12)
- Mirror Mirror (25/04/12)
- Trishna (30/08/12)

==== 2013 ====
- 21 & Over (28/03/13)
- Blancanieves (25/07/13)
- The Bling Ring (01/08/13)
- Don Jon (03/10/13)
- Frances Ha (20/06/13)
- Free Birds (11/12/13)
- The Girl with Nine Wigs (05/09/13)
- A Hijacking (04/07/13)
- I'm So Excited! (23/05/13)
- Inside Llewyn Davis (05/12/13)
- Jayne Mansfield's Car (25/07/13)
- The Last Stand (28/02/13)
- The Master (24/01/13)
- Mr. Morgan's Last Love (26/09/13)
- Promised Land (28/02/13)
- Quartet (09/05/13)
- Safe Haven (18/04/13)
- Safety Not Guaranteed (08/08/13)
- Silver Linings Playbook (28/02/13)
- Something in the Air (28/03/13)
- Stories We Tell (05/09/13)
- To the Wonder (11/07/13)
- The Well-Digger's Daughter (09/05/13)
- Zero Dark Thirty (24/01/13)

==== 2014 ====
- Ain't Them Bodies Saints (20/03/14)
- Best Night Ever (06/03/14)
- John Wick (20/11/14)
- Metro Manila (24/04/14)
- Nurse 3D (27/02/14)
- Oculus (17/04/14)
- The Raid 2 (10/04/14)
- Touch of the Light (27/02/14)
- Tracks (08/05/14)
- The Two Faces of January (26/06/14)
- Under the Skin (16/10/14)
- A Walk Among the Tombstones (16/10/14)

==== 2015 ====
- Belle (30/07/15)
- Dark Places (06/08/15)
- Foxcatcher (19/02/15)
- Infinitely Polar Bear (18/06/15)
- It Follows (23/04/15)
- Kidnapping Freddy Heineken (25/06/15)
