= Haverkort =

Haverkort is a surname. Notable people with the surname include:

- Ben Haverkort (born 1961), Dutch football player and referee
- Kas Haverkort (born 2003), Dutch racing driver
- Loes Haverkort (born 1981), Dutch actress
