= Shocking Blue (film) =

- Film poster
- Directed by: Mark de Cloe
- Screenplay by: Céline Linssen
- Produced by: Jan van der Zanden; Wilant Boekelman; Koji Nelissen
- Starring: Lisa Smit; Dragan Bakema; Niels Gomperts
- Cinematography: Rob Hodselmans
- Edited by: Marc Bechtold
- Music by: Lawrence Horne
- Production company: The Film Kitchen
- Distributed by: A-Film Distribution
- Release dates: January 2010 (Rotterdam); 12 August 2010 (Netherlands)
- Country: Netherlands
- Language: Dutch

Shocking Blue is a 2010 Dutch coming-of-age drama film directed by Mark de Cloe, written by Céline Linssen and stars Lisa Smit, Dragan Bakema, and Niels Gomperts. It was screened at the 2010 Seattle International Film Festival, the São Paulo International Film Festival, the Cairo Panorama of the European Film and the Seville European Film Festival. It received two Golden Calf nominations for Best Supporting Actor (Niels Gomperts) and best cinematography (Rob Hodselmans).

== Plot ==
Thomas, Jacques and Chris, all about sixteen years, are best friends. They live in the Dutch bulb-growing region, where villages, fields and meadows lean against the dunes and beach. Their lives are like so many rural youth, but a dramatic accident changed everything. When the three of them are sitting on the tractor, Jacques falls below it, while Thomas steers the wheel. Thomas asks himself in the depths of his thoughts if his jealousy of Jacques, who ran off with Manou the evening before, had something to do with the accident.

== Cast ==
- Lisa Smit as Manou
- Niels Gomperts as Jaques
- Dragan Bakema as Wojtek
- Sarah Bannier as Femke
- Thijs Feenstra as Vader Thomas en Chantal
- Jim van der Panne as Chris
- Ruben van Weelden as Thomas
