= Pim & Pom: The Big Adventure =

2014 Dutch animated film

- Dutch: Pim & Pom: Het Grote Avontuur
- Directed by: Gioia Smid
- Screenplay by: Fiona van Heemstra; Tingue Dongelmans
- Produced by: Gioia Smid; Michiel de Rooij
- Music by: Alex Debicki; Joren van der Voort
- Production companies: Pim & Pom BV; Flinck Film
- Distributed by: A-Film Benelux
- Release date: 9 April 2014
- Running time: 70 minutes
- Country: Netherlands
- Language: Dutch
- Budget: €1 million
- Box office: $521,973

Pim & Pom: The Big Adventure (Dutch: Pim & Pom: Het Grote Avontuur) is a 2014 Dutch animated adventure film directed by Gioia Smid from a screenplay by Fiona van Heemstra and Tingue Dongelmans, based on the Pim and Pom children's books by Dutch illustrator Fiep Westendorp. Produced by Smid and Michiel de Rooij, the film was produced by the film studios Pim & Pom BV and Flinck Film. It was released in Dutch cinemas on 9 April 2014.

== Premise ==
Pim and Pom's owner's nieces are about to move away, but get the idea of kidnapping Pim and Pom so that they can come with them. After the nieces take them for a picnic in the woods, Pim and Pom discover the nieces' plans and run away. Now, the two house cats must find their way home and survive in the outside world.

== Voice cast ==
- Georgina Verbaan as Pim and the lady
- Tjitske Reidinga as Pom
- Plien van Bennekom as Tracey
- Bianca Krijgsman as Stacey
- Peter Paul Muller as Johnny

== Production ==
Gioia Smid is the director of the Fiep Westendorp Foundation, and in 2008 directed the 52-episode television series The Adventures of Pim and Pom that aired on Dutch Nickelodeon. Smid later decided to work on a feature-length film inspired by the series. According to assistant director Hans Walther, they "spent about two-and-a-half years on the story alone," producing "sixteen versions of the script and [we] redrew the storyboard five times from scratch." The budget for the film was €1 million.

== Release ==
Pim & Pom was released in Dutch and Belgian cinemas on 9 April 2014. In the Netherlands, it opened with $56,734 for a total gross of $501,990. In Belgium, it opened with $4,672 for a total of $19,983, contributing to its total box office gross of $521,973.
