= Bonkers (film) =

- Theatrical release poster
- Directed by: Martin Koolhoven
- Screenplay by: Mieke de Jong
- Produced by: Leontine Petit; Joost de Vries
- Starring: Jesse Rinsma; Carice van Houten; Daan Schuurmans; Tom van Kessel
- Cinematography: Menno Westendorp
- Edited by: Job ter Burg
- Music by: Dirk Brossé
- Production companies: Lemming Film; VPRO
- Distributed by: A-Film Distribution
- Release date: 15 October 2005
- Running time: 90 minutes
- Country: Netherlands
- Box office: $264,168

Bonkers (Dutch: Knetter) is a 2005 Dutch comedy drama film directed by Martin Koolhoven, starring Jesse Rinsma, Carice van Houten and Daan Schuurmans.

It was the opening film of the Cinekid Festival and was released on 15 October 2005. The film won an Audience Award at the Netherlands Film Festival.

== Plot ==
The nine-year-old Bonnie lives together with her mother Lis, a sweet mom who is sometimes happy and energetic but other times gloomy and lethargic, and who is considered by Bonnie as an atypical mom, and her grandmother, who is the one really keeping the family going. All three are big fans of elephants. Bonnie has no siblings, in contrast to her neighbor Koos, who has many brothers, and thinks its weird that Bonnie wants a little brother as he just considers them a hassle. Next door to Bonnie lives the shy Puch. Bonnie and Koos find her creepy, wondering why she's always alone and are afraid she eats human flesh.

Bonnie's life is turned upside down when her grandma has an accident, leaving Bonnie and Lis to fend for themselves. Bonnie has to care for not only herself but also for Lis. From time to time, a woman from Child Protective Services stops by to check if Bonnie is being properly cared for. If she isn’t, Bonnie will have to go to a foster family.

Bonnie is overjoyed when her mother meets shoe salesman Cees, with whom she gets along very well. She fantasizes about her mother and Cees falling in love, and her finally getting a little brother or sister. However, when she discusses this with her mother, she doesn't think it a good idea, and would prefer to have a pet instead. To Bonnie's great surprise, one day her mother brings home a special pet: an elephant. Bonnie thinks it's a wonderful gift, but isn't sure where to hide it when the woman from Child Protective Services suddenly comes by. She wants to place Bonnie in a foster home immediately. Fortunately, her neighbor Puch comes up with an excellent solution for Lis and Bonnie.

== Cast ==
- Carice van Houten as Lis Wolk
- Jesse Rinsma as Bonnie Wolk
- Leny Breederveld as Oma Wolk
- Tom van Kessel as Koos
- Daan Schuurmans as Cees
- Judith Bovenberg as Jorien van de jeugdzorg
- Frieda Pittoors as Puch
- Edo Brunner as meester
- Eva Van Der Gucht as moeder van Koos
- Luk D'Heu as brandweerman
- Bob Fosko as politieagent
- Alex Klaasen as ober
- Martin Koolhoven as kaartjesverkoper circus
- Natasja Loturco as verkoopster babykleding
