= Klem (film) =

2023 Dutch film directed by Frank Ketelaar

- Theatrical release poster
- Directed by: Frank Ketelaar
- Written by: Frank Ketelaar
- Produced by: Robert Kievit
- Starring: Barry Atsma; Jacob Derwig; Georgina Verbaan; Ellen Parren; Claudia Vismara
- Cinematography: Dennis Wielaert
- Edited by: Sandor Soeteman
- Music by: Jorrit Kleijnen; Jacob Meijer; Alexander Reumers
- Production company: BNNVARA
- Distributed by: September Film Distribution
- Release date: 2 February 2023
- Running time: 110 minutes
- Country: Netherlands
- Languages: Dutch; English; Italian
- Box office: $2,470,684

Klem (stylised as KLEM) is a 2023 Dutch film directed and written by Frank Ketelaar. The film won the Golden Film award after having sold 100,000 tickets. The film is based on the television series with the same name.

Barry Atsma, Jacob Derwig and Georgina Verbaan play roles in the film. Principal photography took place from March to May 2022 in Tuscany, Italy. The film became the seventh best visited Dutch film of 2023.

The film was recut into a three episodes 4th season of the television series and broadcast on Dutch public television in January 2024.
