= The Surprise (film) =

2015 film

- Theatrical release poster
- Directed by: Mike van Diem
- Produced by: Hans de Weers
- Starring: Jeroen van Koningsbrugge; Georgina Verbaan
- Cinematography: Rogier Stoffers
- Edited by: Jessica de Koning
- Music by: Brian Byrne
- Distributed by: A-Film Benelux
- Release date: 21 May 2015
- Running time: 102 minutes
- Country: Netherlands
- Language: Dutch

The Surprise (Dutch: De surprise) is a 2015 Dutch comedy film directed by Mike van Diem.

The story concerns a middle-aged man named Jacob, who, following the death of his wealthy mother, inherits an estate that includes his father's large collection of vintage cars. Jacob, surrounded by wealth, is depressed that he cannot find love and wants to end his miserable life. He then tries to commit suicide in one of the vintage cars, a Jaguar E-Type, by running a hose from the exhaust into the cabin. This does not work and he finally enlists the services of an illegal assisted-suicide firm in ending his life and selects the option of a surprise ending. While awaiting sudden death, he meets and falls in love with a shy lady who is also living a life without love and has contracted for the same service. Jacob now has to cancel his contract but, it is binding.

== Cast ==
- Jeroen van Koningsbrugge as Jacob van Zuylen de With
- Georgina Verbaan as Anne de Koning
- Jan Decleir as Cornald Muller
- Henry Goodman as Mr. Jones
- Ankur Bahl as Asif
- Naveed Choudhry as Moshin
- Oliver Gatz as Halim
- Ronny Jhutti as Khuram
- Elisabeth Andersen as Mother
- Tamar Baruch as Marissa de la Rue
- Michiel Blankwaardt as Truckdriver
- Pierre Bokma as Security Van Zuylen Foundation
- Judith Edixhoven as Assistant De Wijs
- Hubert Fermin as De Wijs
- Esther von Arx as Juljia Barsukova

== Reception ==
On review aggregator website Rotten Tomatoes, The Surprise has an approval rating of 88% based on 8 reviews, with an average rating of 6.80/10.
