= Bastiaan Ragas =

Dutch singer and actor

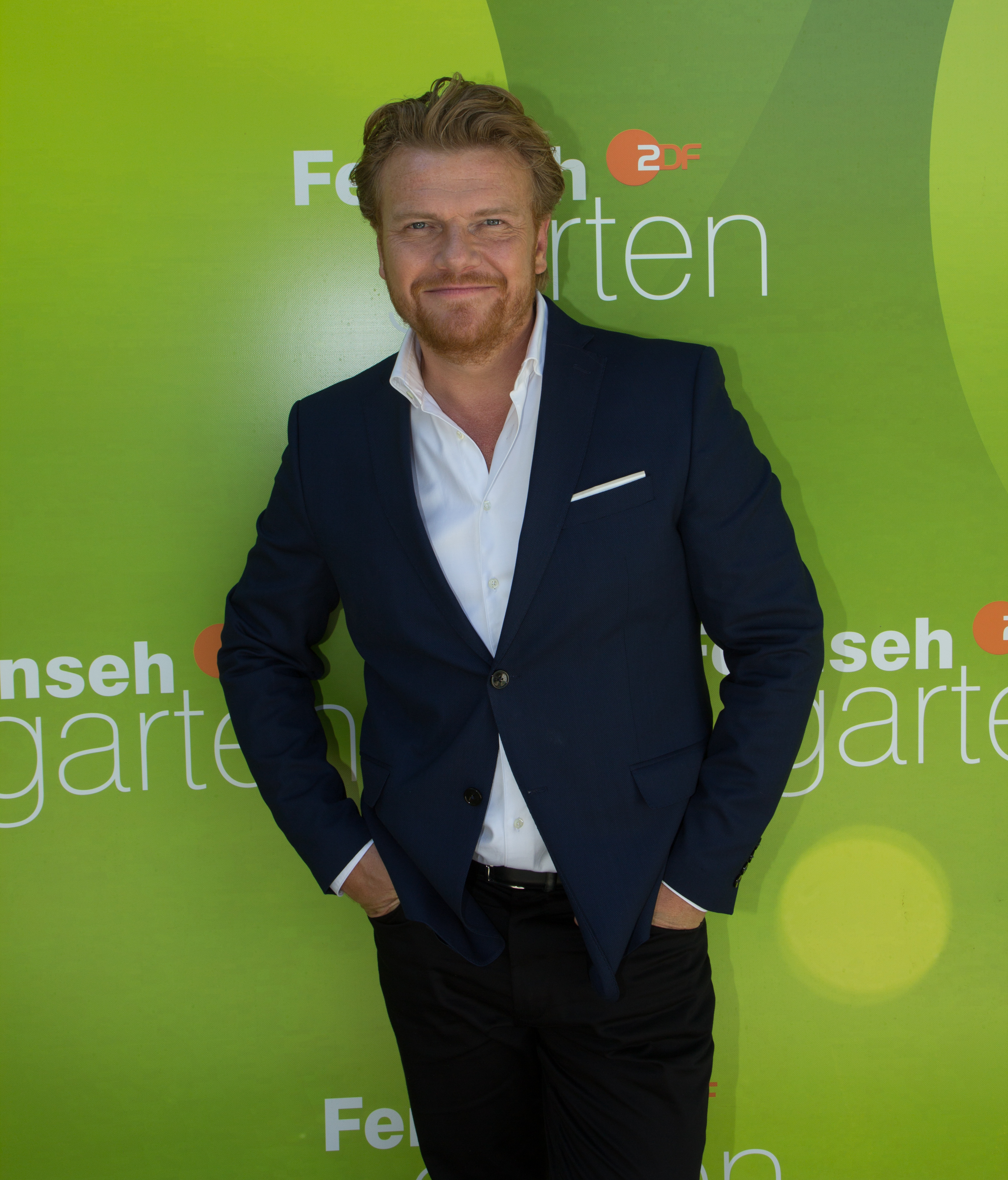
- Ragas in 2018.
- Born: Bastiaan Johannes Ragas; 30 June 1971 (age 55); Lisse, Netherlands

Bastiaan Johannes Ragas (born 30 June 1971) is a Dutch singer and actor.

== Biography ==
Born in Lisse, he was the youngest of three brothers.

Ragas learnt piano and guitar at school. He also participated and traveled with the international musical group Up With People during their 1989-1990 tour.

He first came into the public eye as a member of the Anglo-Dutch boy band Caught in the Act in the 1990s.

Caught in the Act broke up in 1998 and Ragas embarked on a solo career. His first album, Tomorrow is Looking Good, was released in 2000. Also in 2000, he played Radames in the Dutch production of the musical Aïda. He later played d'Artagnan in Joop van den Ende's 2003–2004 production of 3 Musketiers.

Ragas has also worked in film, appearing in the West Frisian language film De Sportman van de Eeuw and providing the Dutch voice of Sinbad in Sinbad: Legend of the Seven Seas. Working on Sinbad he met TV presenter Tooske Breugem and they later starred together in 3 Musketiers in which she played Constance. Their 2003 single Alles (All I Ever Want) reached number in the Dutch charts.

In 2002, he appeared in the hospital drama TV series Trauma 24/7 along with his elder brother Roef. He was on the jury of the Dutch production of Popstars and came second in the Dutch 2006 series of Dancing with the Stars.

Rages appeared in a 2015 episode of the game show De Jongens tegen de Meisjes.

== Personal life ==
Ragas married actress Tooske Ragas in France in 2005 and they have three daughters. He also has a son by a previous relationship with singer and TV presenter Laura Vlasblom.
