= Johnny de Mol =

Dutch actor and presenter (born 1979)

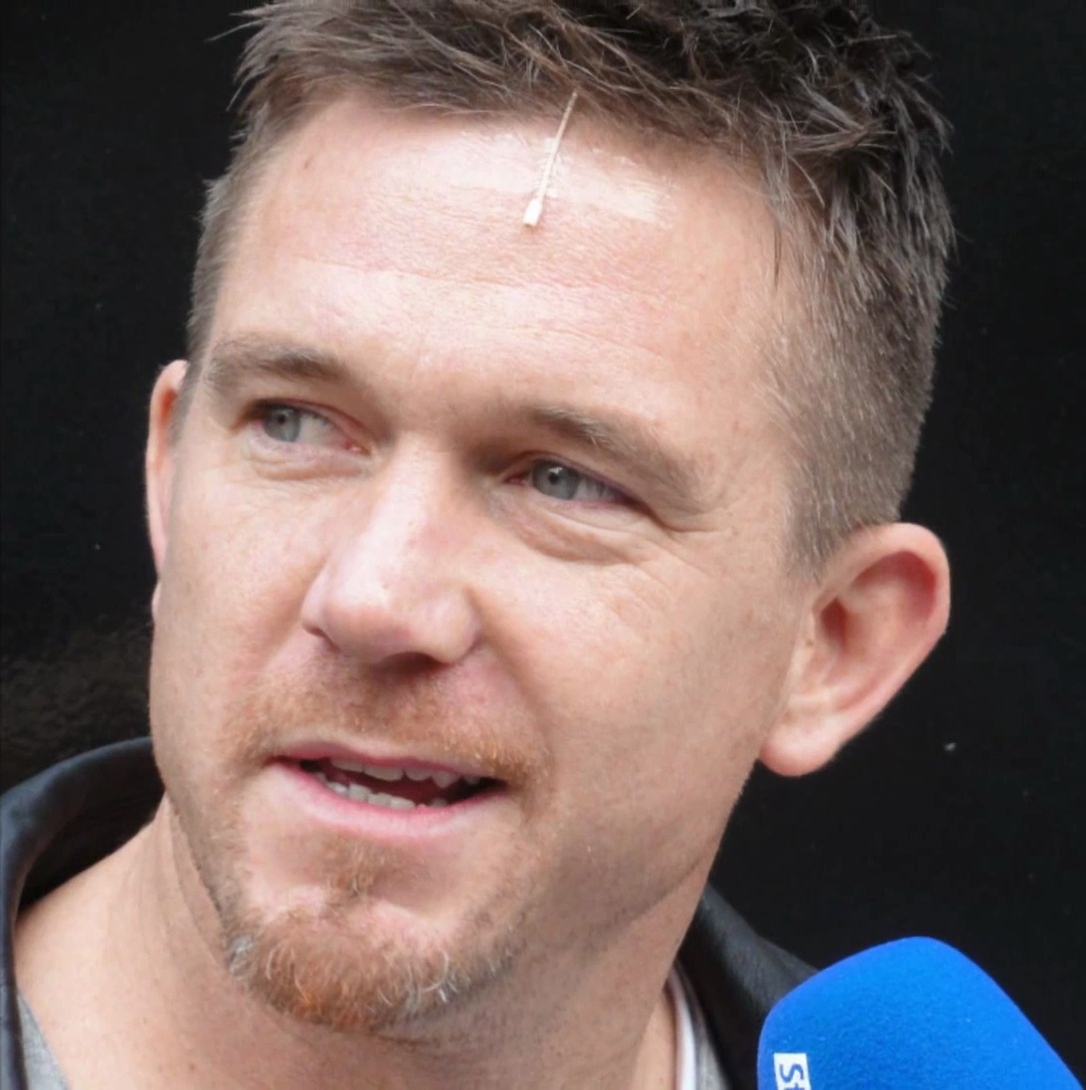
De Mol in 2015

John Carel de Mol (born 12 January 1979) is a Dutch actor and presenter. He is the son of John de Mol Jr. and Willeke Alberti.

== Filmography ==
Year	Title	Role	Notes
2002	Oysters at Nam Kee's	Otto	
2003	Boy Ecury	Ewoud	
2003	The Emperor's Wife	Thembe	
2004	Cool!	Prof	
2004	Simon	Floris	
2004	Erik of het klein insectenboek	Verkennermier	
2004	06/05	Redacteur NRC, John	
2005	Vet hard	Peter	
2005	Een ingewikkeld verhaal, eenvoudig verteld	Tom	Short
2005	Deuce Bigalow: European Gigolo	Canadian College Kid	
2005	Eilandgasten	Tom	
2005	Johan	Johnny Dros	
2006	Ik Omhels Je Met 1000 Armen	Thijm	
2006	Black Book	Theodore	
2006-2007	Van Speijk	Off. Jeroen van Veen	26 episodes
2008	Vox populi	Sjef	
2010	Penoza	Johan Kruimel	8 episodes
2011	Tunnelvision		
2011	Verborgen Gebreken	Sem Vos	8 episodes
2011	Patatje Oorlog	Thomas	
2012	Van God Los	Daan Dekkers	Episode: "Babyshower"
2013	Valentino	David	
2013	Crimi Clowns: De Movie	Wesley Tersago	
2013	Smoorverliefd	Mathias	
2016	Woezel & Pip Op zoek naar de Sloddervos!	Molletje	Voice
2016	Crimi Clowns 2.0: Uitschot	Wesley	
