= San Fu Maltha =

Dutch film producer (born 1958)

- Born: 17 July 1958 (age 67); Rotterdam, Netherlands
- Occupations: Film producer, film distributor
- Children: 3

San Fu Maltha (born 17 July 1958) is a Dutch film producer. He founded the production company Fu Works and he co-founded film distributor A-Film.

== Biography ==
San Fu Maltha was born on 17 July 1958 in Rotterdam in the Netherlands.

He started his film career in the Netherlands as a marketing and publicity manager for Warner Bros. and Columbia TriStar, and he worked in different positions for Meteor Film. When Meteor Film was sold to PolyGram, he became the acquisition manager for PolyGram International in the United Kingdom.

In 1995, he founded his own production company Fu Works. He produced Dutch feature films, among which Phileine Says Sorry (2003) and Black Book (2006), and documentaries. In 2008, his film production Winter in Wartime was released, directed by Martin Koolhoven, based on the novel by Jan Terlouw.

In 1999, he cofounded the film distributor A-Film. He was managing director until 2006, when he sold his majority share due to the work pressure of his production company Fu Works.

San Fu Maltha has three sons. They live in Bilthoven in the Netherlands.

Two of his movies made the shortlist for the Best Foreign Language Film segment of the Academy Awards: Black Book and Winter in Wartime. Both were bought by Sony Classics in the United States.

== Filmography ==
- Costa! (2001)
- Soul Assassin (2001)
- Science Fiction (2002)
- The Emperor's Wife (2003)
- Phileine Says Sorry (2003)
- In Orange (2004)
- Too Fat Too Furious (2005)
- Jade Warrior (2006)
- Black Book (2006)
- Made in Korea (2006)
- 4 Elements (2006)
- Winter in Wartime (2008)
- Tirza (2010)
- Süskind (2012)
- Ennio (2021)
- The Ice Cream Man (2024)
