= Too Fat Too Furious =

2005 film by Tim Oliehoek

- Theatrical release poster
- Directed by: Tim Oliehoek
- Written by: Jan Verheyen; Wijo Koek; Jean-Claude Van Rijckeghem
- Produced by: San Fu Maltha; Jeroen Beker; Frans van Gestel
- Starring: Jack Wouterse; Kürt Rogiers; Bracha van Doesburgh
- Cinematography: Rolf Dekens
- Edited by: Peter Alderliesten
- Music by: Alex Heffes
- Production companies: Fu Works Productions; Clockwork Pictures; Thura Film; Motel Films
- Distributed by: A-Film Distribution
- Release date: 3 February 2005
- Running time: 90 minutes
- Country: Netherlands
- Language: Dutch
- Box office: $1.8 million

Too Fat Too Furious (Dutch: Vet hard) is a 2005 Dutch action comedy film. It is a remake of the Danish film Old Men in New Cars and received a Golden Film for 100,000 visitors.

== Plot ==
Bennie, a clumsy criminal who's touchy about his weight, teams up with his adoptive father's biological (serial killer) son, his employees who in his absence turned his snack-bar into a quiche bakery, a suicidal manic-depressive woman and a Yugoslavian who unintentionally keeps blowing things up. They need to get 300.000 Euros to get Bennie's father a new liver. Complicating matters are that Bennie is being stalked by gangsters who want him to pay back a debt, the employees are more interested in cooking than in criminality, nobody can communicate with the Yugoslavian, the adoptive and biological son don't get along, and everything that can go wrong does go wrong - leaving a path of damaged buildings, people and - especially - vehicles behind.

== Cast ==
- Jack Wouterse as Bennie
- Kürt Rogiers as Koen Mast
- Bracha van Doesburgh as Katja Wielaard
- Jaak Van Assche as Johan Mast
- Johnny de Mol as Peter
- Cas Jansen as Martin
