= Bernhard, schavuit van Oranje =

- Daan Schuurmans as Prince Bernhard of Lippe-Biesterfeld
- Genre: Serial drama Docudrama
- Starring: Daan Schuurmans; Eric Schneider; Loes Haverkort; Ellen Vogel; Lotje van Lunteren
- Country of origin: Netherlands
- Original languages: Dutch; German; English; Spanish
- No. of seasons: 1
- No. of episodes: 4

Production
- Production locations: Netherlands; Germany; England; Canada; Argentina
- Running time: 45 minutes

Original release
- Network: VPRO
- Release: January 4 – January 25, 2010

Bernhard, schavuit van Oranje (English title: Bernhard, scoundrel of Orange) is a Dutch television program depicting the turbulent life of a prince consort. Paul Voorthuizen produced the four-part miniseries for VPRO, which was broadcast in 2010.

== About ==
It is a compelling drama concerning a man who tries to be himself, but must survive deep crises, finally to see the real meaning of love. Within the Dutch royal family, there is actually no more talked about character than Prince Bernhard of Lippe-Biesterfeld. Whether it concerns Greet Hofmans, extramarital affairs, or Lockheed, Prince Bernhard faced a lot of scandals throughout the course of his life. Besides this he was, and is a person, loved by many as a war hero. A man of extremes. In four parts Prince Bernhard tells the tale of his life. Not only through the spyglass, but especially to his grandson's wife, Princess Máxima of the Netherlands, who will be soon the Queen next to Prince Willem-Alexander. In a way, she takes the same position as Prince Bernhard did in his life. In their conversations and discussions, it becomes clear how much they are different, but also how much they are the same. For Princess Máxima, this is sometimes very confronting. The tale drags us throughout the course of the Prince's life, from Soestdijk, his beloved German Reckenwalde, Berlin, London, Argentina and Canada.

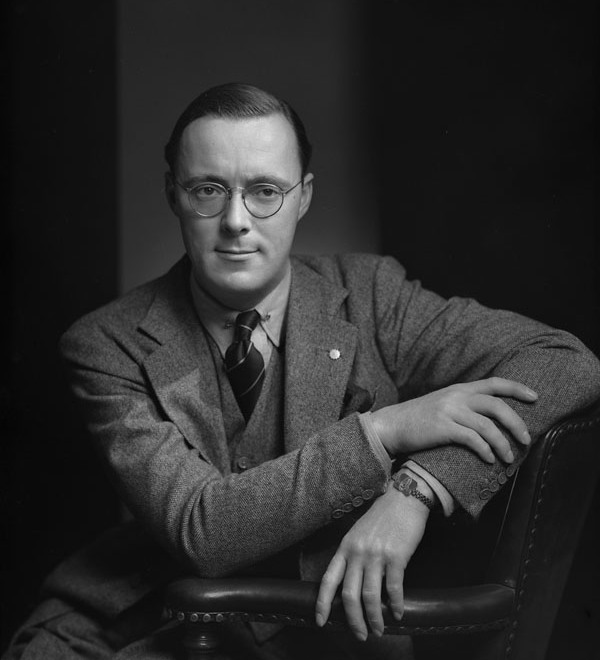
Prince Bernhard of Lippe-Biesterfeld in 1942.

== Cast ==
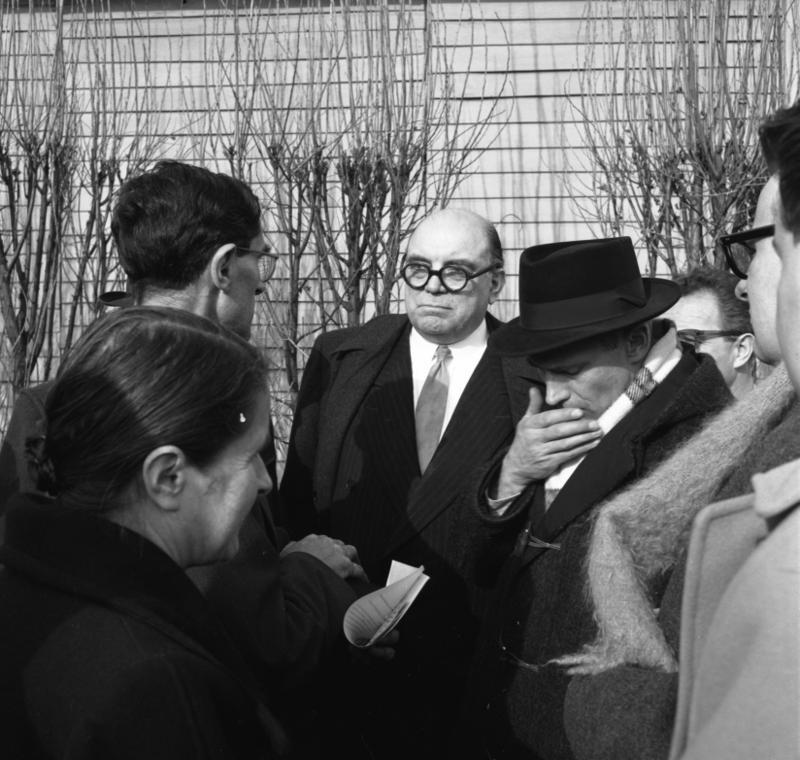
Sefton Delmer-cenetre in photo. 1930's Journalist/propagandist -British government

Actor	Role	Notes
Daan Schuurmans	Prince Bernhard of Lippe-Biesterfeld	1930s - 1970s
Eric Schneider	Prince Bernhard of Lippe-Biesterfeld	1990s - 21st century
Loes Haverkort	Princess Máxima	1990s - 21st century
Ellen Vogel	Juliana of the Netherlands	1990s - 21st century
David Eeles	Sefton Delmer	1930/40s
Lotje van Lunteren	Juliana of the Netherlands	1930s - 1970s
Willy van der Griendt	Armgard of Sierstorpff-Cramm	1930s - 1970s
Herman van Ulsen	Prince Bernhard of Lippe	1930s
Rick Nicolet	Wilhelmina of the Netherlands	1930s - 1960s
Hugo Haenen	Prince Claus	1960s
Marie Louise Stheins	Beatrix of the Netherlands	1990s - 21st century
Vincent Linthorst	Prince Willem-Alexander	1990s - 21st century
Elsje Scherjon	Cocky Gilles	1990s - 21st century
Frederik de Groot	Willem Drees	1940s - 1950s
Trudi Klever	Greet Hofmans	1940s - 1950s
Amelie van de Klashorst	Princess Christina "Marijke"	1940s - 1950s
Skip Goeree	Ian Fleming	1940s
Vincent Rietveld	Erik Hazelhoff Roelfzema	1940s
Juan Carlos Tajes	Juan Perón	1940s
Reinier Bulder	Eva Perón	1940s
Beppe Costa	Alfredo Stroessner	1950s
