= Frogs & Toads =

2009 Dutch children's musical film

- Theatrical release poster
- Directed by: Simone van Dusseldorp
- Written by: Simone van Dusseldorp
- Produced by: Leontine Petit; Joost de Vries
- Starring: Nino den Brave; Whitney Franker; Juul Vrijdag; Thijs Goedknegt; Georgina Verbaan; Remko Vrijdag; Quintis Ristie
- Cinematography: Daniël Bouquet
- Edited by: Wouter Jansen
- Music by: Kees van der Vooren; Arend Niks
- Production companies: Lemming Film; Bos Bros. Film-TV Productions; Katholieke Radio Omroep
- Distributed by: A-Film Distribution
- Release date: 11 February 2009
- Country: Netherlands
- Language: Dutch
- Box office: $1.7 million

Frogs & Toads (Dutch: Kikkerdril) is a 2009 Dutch children's musical film written and directed by Simone van Dusseldorp, starring Nino den Brave and Whitney Franker. The film is part of the Cinema Junior series.

The film was released on 11 February 2009 by A-Film Distribution and received positive reviews.

== Cast ==
- Nino den Brave as Max
- Whitney Franker as Jesse
- Juul Vrijdag as Oma
- Thijs Goedknegt as Jannes
- Georgina Verbaan as Heleen
- Remko Vrijdag as Buschauffeur Arie
- Quintis Ristie as Jesse's father

== Home media ==
The film was released on DVD on 25 June 2009 by A-Film Home Entertainment.
