= The Sea That Thinks =

- Film poster
- Directed by: Gert de Graaff
- Written by: Gert de Graaff
- Produced by: René Huybrechtse; René Scholten
- Cinematography: Gert de Graaff
- Edited by: Gert de Graaff; Jan Dop
- Music by: René de Graaff
- Production companies: Studio Nieuwe Gronden; Theorema Films
- Distributed by: A-Film Distribution
- Release date: 21 December 2000
- Running time: 100 minutes
- Country: Netherlands
- Language: Dutch

The Sea That Thinks (Dutch: De zee die denkt) is a 2000 Dutch experimental film directed by Gert de Graaff. The film makes heavily use of optical illusions to tell a "story within a story" revolving around a screenwriter writing a script called The Sea That Thinks. The script details what is happening around him and eventually begins to affect what happens around him.
