= Soul Assassin =

2001 film directed by Laurence Malkin

- Theatrical release poster
- Directed by: Laurence Malkin
- Written by: Laurence Malkin; Chad Thumann
- Produced by: Laurence Malkin; San Fu Maltha
- Starring: Skeet Ulrich; Kristy Swanson; Derek de Lint; Rena Owen
- Cinematography: Lex Wertwijn
- Edited by: Herman P. Koerts
- Music by: Alan Williams
- Production companies: Parabolic Pictures; Rebel Entertainment
- Distributed by: A-Film Distribution
- Release date: 22 August 2001
- Running time: 96 minutes
- Country: Netherlands
- Languages: English; Dutch
- Budget: ƒ14 million

Soul Assassin is a 2001 English-language Dutch action thriller film directed by Laurence Malkin and starring Rena Owen, Kristy Swanson and Skeet Ulrich. It was released 22 August 2001 and was considered a box-office bomb.

== Plot ==
The film is about a young security agent, Kevin Burke, who is employed by a multinational banking firm. He intends to ask his girlfriend Rosalind to marry him.

Interpol suspected Jorgensen's firm of money laundering, based on anonymous tips. When Jorgensen finds out there is a mole in his firm, he suspects Rosalind and has her murdered by a hitman from the Barcelona branch of the firm. Kevin then swears to avenge Rosalind's death.

With the help of Tessa Jansen, an Interpol agent, Kevin learns that Jorgensen has had his father murdered when he was young, in order to groom Kevin as an assassin for his firm.

In the final scene Mr. Ficks admits to being the mole and planting the trail to lead Jorgensen to suspect and kill Rosalind, in order that Kevin should kill Jorgensen, and Mr. Ficks could take over the firm from him.

== Cast ==
- Skeet Ulrich as Kevin Burke
- Kristy Swanson as Tessa Jansen
- Derek de Lint as Karl Jorgensen
- Rena Owen as Karina
- Antonie Kamerling as Karl Jorgensen Jr.
- Katherine Lang as Rosalind Bremmond
- Serge-Henri Valcke as Mr. Ficks
- Georgina Verbaan (cameo)

== Production ==
The film is presented in 1.85:1 anamorphic widescreen. Much of the film is shot in blue mood lighting. The film makes extensive use of flashbacks.
