= Ice Storm (film) =

2009 film

- Directed by: Steven de Jong
- Starring: Willeke van Ammelrooy; Chantal Janzen
- Release date: 13 December 2009
- Running time: 108 minutes
- Country: Netherlands
- Languages: Dutch, West Frisian

Ice Storm (Dutch: De Hel van '63; English: The Hell of ‘63) is a 2009 Dutch drama film directed by Steven de Jong. The film is based on the 1963 edition of the Elfstedentocht, a long-distance ice skating tour in the Netherlands. This 1963 edition became known as "The hell of '63" when only 69 of the nearly 10,000 participants were able to finish the race, due to the extremely low temperatures of -18 °C, powder snow and a harsh eastern wind.

== Cast ==
- Willeke van Ammelrooy as Moeder Will
- Chantal Janzen as Dieuwke
- Kees Prins as TV-commentator
- Pierre Bokma as Harry Linthorst Homan
- Dennis Overeem as Militair Edwin
- Cas Jansen as Henk Brenninkmeijer
- Herman Otten as Erik
