= Johan (2005 film) =

- Theatrical release poster
- Directed by: Nicole van Kilsdonk
- Screenplay by: Mieke de Jong
- Produced by: Hans de Wolf; Hans de Weers
- Starring: Michiel Huisman; Johnny de Mol; Caro Lenssen; Huub Stapel; Ariane Schluter; Leona Philppo
- Cinematography: Guido van Gennep
- Edited by: Michiel Reichwein
- Music by: Fons Merkies
- Production companies: Egmond Film and Television; VARA
- Distributed by: Buena Vista International
- Release date: 6 October 2005
- Running time: 98 minutes
- Country: Netherlands
- Language: Dutch
- Box office: $194,325

Johan is a 2005 Dutch romantic comedy film directed by Nicole van Kilsdonk. It was released in the Netherlands on 6 October 2005 by Buena Vista International.

== Cast ==
- Michiel Huisman as Johan Dros
- Johnny de Mol as Johnny Dros
- Gilles de Voogd as Willem Dros
- Caro Lenssen as Evy
- Huub Stapel as Rinus Dros
- Ariane Schluter as Millie Dros
- Leona Philppo as Hester

== Release ==
The film was released on DVD by Buena Vista Home Entertainment on 26 April 2006.

== See also ==
- List of Dutch films of 2005
