= The Day My Father Became a Bush =

2016 film

- Film poster
- Directed by: Nicole van Kilsdonk
- Written by: Nicole van Kilsdonk
- Starring: Celeste Holsheimer
- Production company: Lemming Film
- Distributed by: Lemming Film Distribution
- Release dates: 10 September 2016 (TIFF); 22 March 2017 (Netherlands)
- Running time: 90 minutes
- Countries: Netherlands; Belgium; Croatia
- Language: Dutch

The Day My Father Became a Bush (Dutch: Toen mijn vader een struik werd) is a 2016 Dutch drama film directed by Nicole van Kilsdonk. Filmed in Croatia, it was shortlisted by the EYE Film Institute Netherlands as one of the eight films to be selected as the potential Dutch submission for the Academy Award for Best Foreign Language Film at the 90th Academy Awards. However, it was not selected, with Layla M. being chosen as the Dutch entry.

== Cast ==
- Celeste Holsheimer as Toda
- Teun Kuilboer as Father
