= Daan Schuurmans =

Dutch actor (born 1972)

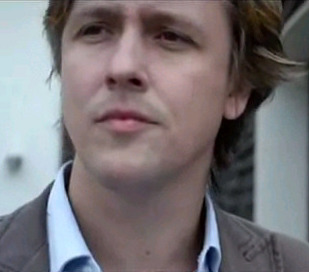
- Daan Schuurmans in De maan is Kapot
- Born: 24 January 1972 (age 54); Rotterdam, Netherlands
- Occupation: Actor
- Years active: 1996–present
- Spouse: Bracha van Doesburgh
- Children: 3

Daniël Adrianus Augustinus "Daan" Schuurmans (born 24 January 1972) is a Dutch actor. He is married to Dutch actress Bracha van Doesburgh and they have a daughter named Sophia and twins sons named Kees and Boris.

== Career ==
Schuurmans began his career in 1996, when he played a role in Fort Alpha. After several other roles he landed in Westenwind. After his roles in both Costa! and the TV series with the same title he received national recognition and played roles in other national productions, including Volle maan, Phileine zegt sorry, Polleke, Pipo en de p-p-Parelridder, Snowfever and Floris.

In 2006, Schuurmans played in the TV series Keyzer & De Boer Advocaten.

Since 2014 he's been starring in the TV series Heer en Meester (Lord and Master) as Valentijn Bentinck, a charming millionaire who likes investigating crimes and has a mysterious past.

He is also recently starring in several Dutch theater productions.

In 2022 he was the presenter and narrator of the Dutch historical docudrama Het verhaal van Nederland.

== Selected filmography ==
Year	Title	Role	Notes
1997	Jewish Boxing	Actor	Short film
1999	Dropouts	Hotel receptionist	
1999	The Delivery	Man on terrace	
2000	Harakiri	Operator	
2001	Costa!	Rens	First starring role
2001	Dok 12	Piet	
2002	Barry H.	Barry	Short film
2002	Volle maan	Ties	Full Moon Party (International title)
2003	So Be It	Dealer	Straight-to-video release
2003	Phileine zegt sorry	Dylan	
2003	Polleke	Spiek	
2003	Pipo en de p-p-Parelridder	Parelridder Didero van Donderstein	
2004	Snowfever	Ryan	
2004	Floris	Van Rossum jr.	
2005	Deuce Bigalow: European Gigolo	Belgian Gigolo	First international movie
2005	Wereld van stilstand	Max	Short film
2005	Bonkers	Cees	
2007	Alles is Liefde	Kees Tromp	
2008	De Brief voor de Koning	Gray Knight Bendoe	
2010	Bernhard, schavuit van Oranje	Prince Bernhard of Lippe-Biesterfeld	
2011	The Gang of Oss	Wachtmeester Roelofse	
2013	The Dinner	Serge	
2016	De Held		
2018	Mocro Maffia	Rein van Waard	
2019	Adults in the Room		
