= Great Freedom No. 7 =

- Directed by: Helmut Käutner
- Written by: Helmut Käutner and Richard Nicolas
- Produced by: Hans Tost
- Starring: Hans Albers
- Cinematography: Werner Krien
- Edited by: Anneliese Schönnenbeck
- Music by: Werner Eisbrenner
- Production company: Terra Film
- Distributed by: Deutsche Filmvertriebs (DFV)
- Release date: 15 December 1944
- Running time: 111 minutes
- Country: Germany
- Language: German

Great Freedom No. 7 (German: Große Freiheit Nr. 7) is a 1944 German musical drama film directed by Helmut Käutner. It was named after Große Freiheit (grand freedom), a street next to Hamburg's Reeperbahn road in the St. Pauli red light district.

The film is also known as Port of Freedom in the United Kingdom.

It was shot at the Tempelhof and Babelsberg Studios in Berlin, and on location in Hamburg and Prague.

== Plot summary ==
The film tells the story of the blond "singing sailor" Hannes Kröger (played by Hans Albers) who works in a St. Pauli club - address: Große Freiheit 7 - and falls in love with a girl played by Ilse Werner. But he acts too slowly and she falls in love with his rival Willem (Hans Söhnker) and Hannes returns to the sea.

== Cast ==
- Hans Albers as Hannes Kroeger
- Ilse Werner as Gisa Häuptlein
- Hans Söhnker as Willem
- Hilde Hildebrand as Anita
- Gustav Knuth as Fiete
- Günther Lüders as Jens
- Ilse Fürstenberg as Gisa's mother
- Ethel Reschke as Margot
- Erna Sellmer as Frau Kaasbohm
- Kurt Wieschala as Jan
- Helmut Käutner as Karl
- Richard Nicolas as Admiral
- Maria Besendahl as Frau Boergel
- Justus Ott as Herr Wellenkamp
- Gottlieb Reeck as Herr Puhlmann
- Thea Thiele as Consul's wife
- Alfred Braun as Rundfunkreporter
- Rudolf Koch-Riehl as Master of ceremonies
- Karl-Heinz Peters as Postman
- Erwin Loraino as Sailor

== Soundtrack ==
- Hans Albers – "Auf der Reeperbahn nachts um halb eins" - On the Reeperbahn at Half Past Midnight (song)
- Hilde Hildebrand – "Beim ersten Mal, da tut's noch weh"
- Hans Albers – "La Paloma"
- Hans Albers – "Nein, ich kann Dich nicht vergessen"
- Hans Albers – "Schön ist die Liebe im Hafen"
- Hans Albers – "Was kann es denn schöneres geben"
- Hans Albers – "Wenn ein Seemann mal nach Hamburg kommt"

== Production ==
Due to the threat of Allied bombing raids to Hamburg Harbour and to the Ufa studios in Berlin's Neubabelsberg and Tempelhof when it was made in 1943 (May to November), most of the movie was shot in Prague's Barrandov Studios by Helmut Käutner, as the first Agfa colorfilm by Terra. Portions were filmed aboard the four-masted barque Padua. For a scene with a boat trip in Hamburg harbour warships had to be covered up.

== Release ==
The film premiered in Prague on 15 December 1944, and was released in Germany on 9 August 1945.

== Reception ==
postwar theatrical release poster

Nazi propaganda minister Joseph Goebbels was dissatisfied, and demanded many changes to make the film more "German", for instance by renaming the lead role from Jonny (as in Albers' earlier hit song "Good bye, Jonny") to Hannes. After a year of editing, the movie was banned anyway in Nazi Germany on 12 December 1944.

== Works cited ==
- Hull, David (1969). Film in the Third Reich: Art and Propaganda in Nazi Germany. Simon & Schuster. SBN 671214861.
