= Cas Jansen =

Dutch actor

Cas Jansen (born Casper Jansen, 24 June 1977) is a Dutch actor. He was born in Badhoevedorp, the Netherlands. He voiced Emo in the short film Elephants Dream (2006).

He is also known for his appearances in the Dutch soap opera Goede tijden, slechte tijden.

== Filmography ==
- Too Fat Too Furious (Vet hard) (2005)
- Elephants Dream (2006)
- The Hell of '63 (2009)
- Old Stars (2011)
