= Lemming Film =

Dutch production company

- Logo used since 2005.
- Industry: Film
- Founded: 1995
- Founders: Leontine Petit; Joost de Vries
- Products: Motion pictures
- Website: lemmingfilm.com

Lemming Film is a Dutch production company founded by Leontine Petit and Joost de Vries with production facilities located in the Netherlands, Belgium and Germany, known for producing films such as Total Loss, Schnitzel Paradise and Frogs & Toads. Joost de Vries left the company in 2016.

In 2021, Lemming Film and A Private View launched a new joint venture called Lemming Film Belgium based in Ghent. That same year, Lemming Film established a new creative alliance with eight other independent production companies under the name The Creatives, intending to jointly develop a series of drama series and feature films.

== Filmography ==
=== Film ===
- Total Loss (2000)
- Lepel (2005)
- Schnitzel Paradise (2005)
- Bonkers (2005)
- Dunya and Desi (2008)
- Frogs & Toads (2009)
- The Indian (2009)
- Boy 7 (2015)
- Blood, Sweat & Tears (2015)
- The Day My Father Became a Bush (2016)
- Dead & Beautiful (2021)
- Rhinegold (2022)
- Sweet Dreams (2023)
- Mr. K (2024)
- The Birthday Party (2025)
- Any Other Night (TBA)
