= Full Moon Party (film) =

2002 Dutch film directed by Johan Nijenhuis

- Directed by: Johan Nijenhuis
- Written by: Mischa Alexander
- Produced by: Johan Nijenhuis; Alain de Levita
- Starring: Daan Schuurmans; Georgina Verbaan; Cas Jansen; Ellen Ten Damme; Chantal Janzen; Jasmine Sendar
- Cinematography: Maarten van Keller
- Edited by: Michiel Reichwein; Wiebe van der Vliet
- Music by: Martijn Schimmer
- Production companies: Nijenhuis & de Levita Film & TV; BBN
- Distributed by: Independent Films (Theatrical); Universal Pictures; (Home media)
- Release date: 10 October 2002
- Country: Netherlands
- Language: Dutch
- Box office: $2,955,586

Full Moon Party (Dutch: Volle Maan) is a 2002 Dutch coming-of-age romantic comedy film directed by Johan Nijenhuis.

It received a Golden Film (75,000 tickets sold) and a Platinum Film (200,000 tickets sold).

== Plot ==
It is graduation day at a high school in Twente. To celebrate the end of high school, Hans Nijboer (played by Cas Jansen) invites all of his friends on a boat trip to Mallorca, Spain. The boat is owned by his older brother Ties (played by Daan Schuurmans), who has cut ties with their father. Once the friends have all come aboard the boat, they start for Mallorca. While they are sailing to their destination, a police boat drops off another high school student, Treesje (played by Georgina Verbaan), a goth girl who is not friends with anyone on the boat.

Upon arrival in Spain, they decide to look for the Full Moon party, a party at a secret location. That night, the friends visit a Dutch bar, where they witness the breakup of two of their friends, Bobbie and Esmee. Ties meets a Dutch singer named Sacha (played by Ellen Ten Damme) and immediately falls for her. The night after, Ties performs one of his songs at the same bar, but other Dutch men call him names and yell at them. A fight begins, and Hans is the one who ends up getting hurt.

A few days later, the group finally finds the location of the Full Moon Party. Ties is surprised when he hears his own song, performed by Sacha, who stole it. She invites him to sing the song with her. After the same Dutch men yell at him again and Sacha talks some courage into him, Ties decides to sing his song with her. Afterwards, they go to his room and make passionate love. However, they are spied on by Natasja (played by Jasmine Sendar), one of the group of friends, who is in love with Ties. She goes back to her room, where she finds comfort in her best friend, Steven. They end up making love as well. Meanwhile, Bobbie discovers that Esmee has taken off with Luc. Bobbie realizes he does not want to lose his girlfriend and he goes after them. Just in time, he arrives at the boat as Esmee is about to be raped by Luc. He knocks Luc unconscious and sails back to land with Esmee, where they start to make love too.

When all the couples arrive at the boat, they find Andrea (played by Chantal Janzen) knocking on her bedroom door, calling for her boyfriend Hans. When he will not open up, Ties breaks down the door, only to find his brother lying on the floor. They soon discover Hans took an overdose. With the help of Treesje, they are able to pump his stomach and Hans awakens.

The next day, it is time to leave Mallorca and head back to the Netherlands. Back in their own country, new couples have formed. Ties decides to go on tour with Sacha, while Treesje has hooked up with the nerd of the group, Rikki (played by Teun Kuilboer). Hans decides to stay on the boat for a year, trying to figure out what he really wants with his life. While everybody takes a seat in one of the cars, happy after the vacation and their new-found relationships, Andrea sits alone, not sure what to do. At the end of the movie, we see Hans on the boat, with some girls offering him coffee. Andrea shows up, meaning she gave up her rich and famous lifestyle to be with the man she loves.
