= Loes Haverkort =

Dutch actress (born 1981)

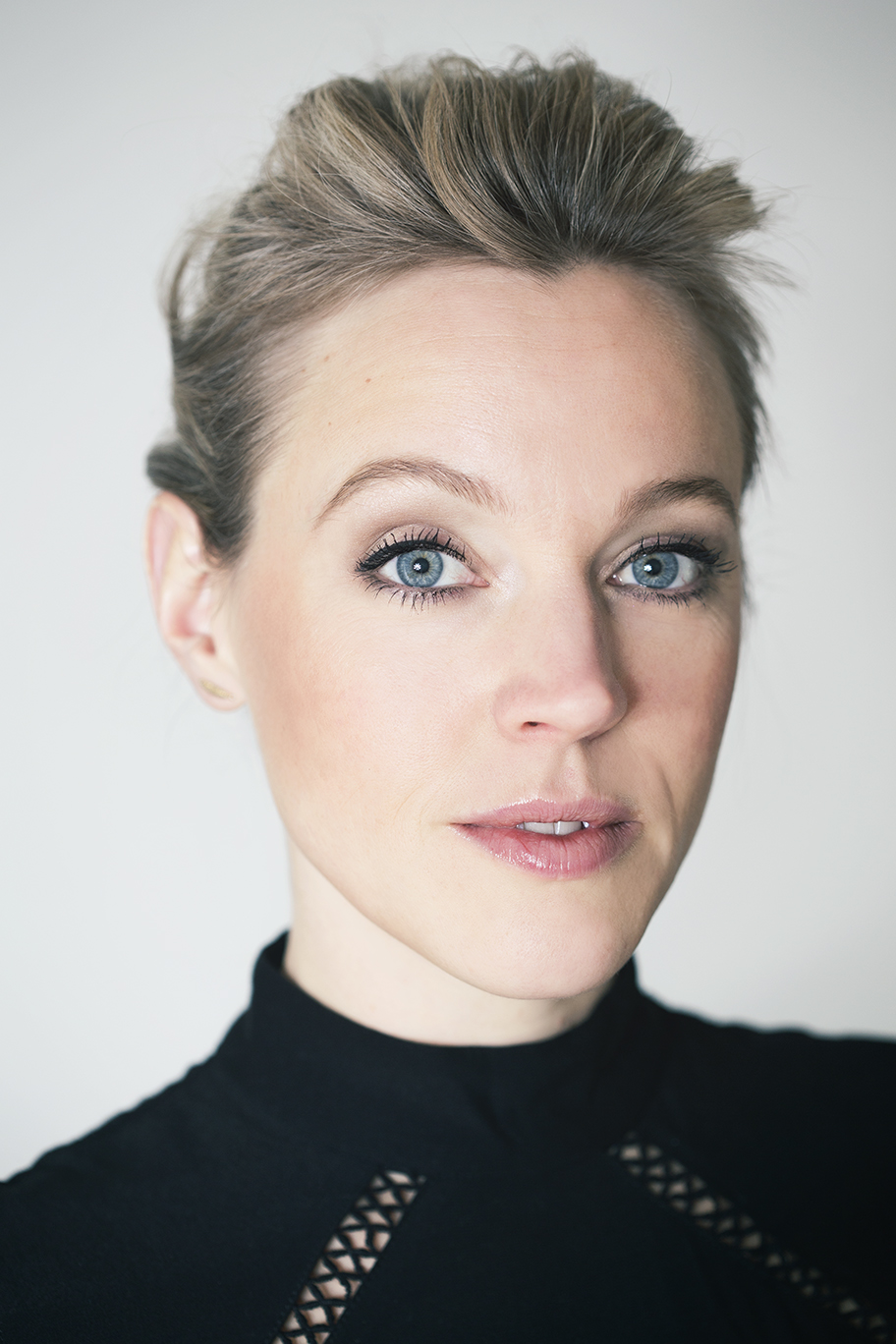
- Born: 19 January 1981 (age 45); Almelo, Netherlands
- Occupation: Actress
- Years active: 2004–present

Loes Haverkort (born 19 January 1981) is a Dutch actress. She has performed in movies, television shows and theatre productions.

== Career ==
Haverkort did her acting course at the Maastricht Academy of Dramatic Arts. She has performed in the musical Soldier of Orange and a play based on the 1987 movie Fatal Attraction. The adaptation and her performance were praised. She has been one of the presenters of the show Verbond van Ongeleide Correspondenten.

She played the lead role in the movie Rendez-vous, directed by Antoinette Beumer. She sang the title song of the movie. She has acted in the Dutch television series Bernhard, schavuit van Oranje.

Haverkort played the female lead in a Dutch comedy movie named Voor Elkaar Gemaakt, which is a remake of the German movie de:Vaterfreuden.

In 2019, she played a role in the romantic comedy film Singel 39.

She played Dr. Lena Linderman, the main character's love interest in the crime TV series Van der Valk.

Haverkort won the 2023 season of the photography television show Het Perfecte Plaatje in which contestants compete to create the best photo in various challenges. She was a contestant in the 2025 anniversary season of the television show Wie is de Mol?. She reached the final.

== Personal life ==
Loes Haverkort is married to pianist Floris Verbeij. She has one son and one daughter with her husband.
