= Radames =

Radames or Radamés is a Hispanic masculine given name that may refer to

- Radamés Gnattali (1906–1988), Brazilian composer, conductor, orchestrator, and arranger
- Radamés González (born 1956), Cuban marathon runner
- Radamés Martins Rodrigues da Silva (born 1986), Brazilian association football midfielder
- Radames Pera (born 1960), American actor
- Randy Radames Ruiz (born 1977), American baseball player
- Radamés Treviño (1945–1970), Mexican cyclist

Also

- Radamès, a fictional character in Verdi's opera Aida.
