= Golden Onion =

Dutch film award

The Golden Onion (Dutch: Gouden Ui) was a Dutch film award that was awarded to the worst Dutch movies, actors and directors. It was intended to counterpoint the Golden Calf-awards, just like the Razzie counterpoints the Academy Awards.

It was an initiative of a group of fourth-year students from the Netherlands Film and Television Academy, who formed the jury together with film journalists. The nominations for the first awards ceremony were announced on October 3, 2005, after which the awards were presented on October 6, 2005, in the old Scala cinema in Utrecht. As with the Razzies, it was not expected that the “winners” would come to collect their awards. The last edition was organized in 2007.
