= Floris (film) =

2004 film directed by Jean van de Velde

- Film poster
- Directed by: Jean van de Velde
- Screenplay by: Gerard Soeteman
- Based on: Floris by: Gerard Soeteman
- Produced by: Johan Nijenhuis; Alain de Levita
- Starring: Michiel Huisman; Birgit Schuurman
- Cinematography: Jules Van Den Steenhoven
- Edited by: Herman P. Koerts
- Music by: John Ewbank; Tom Bakker
- Production companies: Nijenhuis & de Levita Film & TV; Katholieke Radio Omroep
- Distributed by: Independent Films (Theatrical); Universal Pictures; (Home media)
- Release date: 16 December 2004
- Running time: 105 minutes
- Country: Netherlands
- Language: Dutch
- Box office: $1,117,424

Floris is a 2004 Dutch medieval action family film directed by Jean van de Velde and starring Michiel Huisman as the grandson of the original Floris from the 1969 TV series. The new side-kick is "Pi", played by popstar Birgit Schuurman. Some of the 1969 footage with Rutger Hauer and Jos Bergman is included in the film. Originally Hauer was asked to play the father of young Floris, but he declined. The film was shot in 2003.

== Cast ==
- Michiel Huisman as Floris van Rosemondt
- Victor Löw as Floris sr.
- Birgit Schuurman as Pi
- Loes Wouterson as Jacoba
- Linda van Dyck as Hertogin van Gelre
- Henk Poort as Sergeant sr.
- Kees Boot as Sergeant jr.
