= Hernen Castle =

Dutch castle from the 14th century

Coordinates: 51.8346°N 5.6763°E

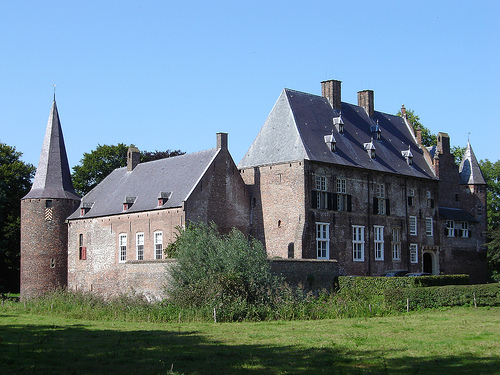
Hernen castle

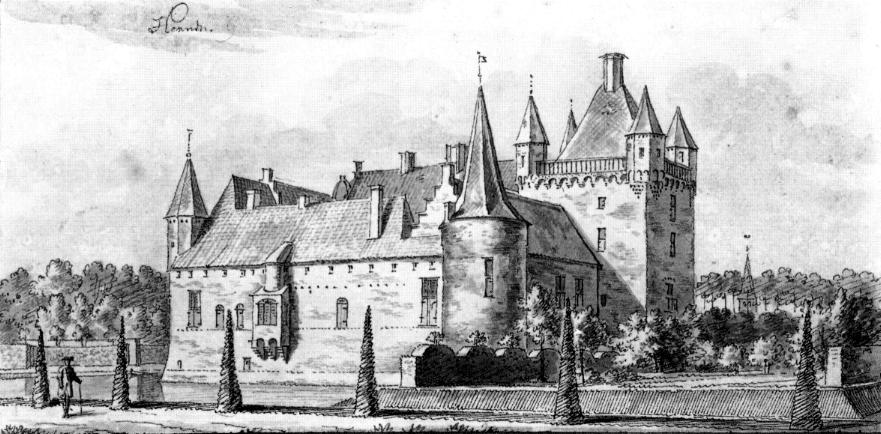
Hernen castle with keep in the 18th century

Hernen Castle is a Dutch castle from the 14th century.

It is a well-preserved medieval castle in the province of Gelderland in the Netherlands. It is situated in the village of Hernen (municipality of Wijchen), in the far west of the Rijk van Nijmegen. It probably originated around 1350, and then consisted only of a keep and a curtain wall surrounding a bailey. The bailey was later filled in with other buildings, leaving a relatively small courtyard. The keep collapsed in the 18th century.

The castle has not been permanently inhabited since the 17th century and has never been besieged which is why it is still largely in its medieval state. It is the only castle in the Netherlands with a covered wall walk.

In 1883 the castle was bought by the Den Tex family, who in 1874 had ascended into nobility, as a hunting lodge. In April 1940 Baroness Metelerkamp-den Tex, Lady of Hernen, donated the castle to the Friends of the Geldersche Kasteelen Foundation, which was set up especially for this purpose. A part of the castle is open to the public; another part is occupied by the A.A. Bredius Foundation.

In 1968, the television series Floris, featuring Rutger Hauer in the leading role, was partially recorded at this castle.

== Motte ==
September 2009, archaeologist Laurens Flokstra and historian Wim Kattenberg, both from Wijchen, came across the remains of a much older Motte and bailey castle, west of the river De Elst. On an old aerial photo from the Royal Air Force, Flokstra had discovered a circular structure in the landscape, after which they made a 'radargram' of the intended terrain with a ground-penetrating radar. This showed that a damped moat had to be present in the soil. In the subsequent excavations, potsherds from the 12th and 13th centuries were found on the site of the former canal. Further discoveries, in the center of the former castle, show that the motte must have been here at the beginning of the twelfth century.

== See also ==
- List of castles in the Netherlands
