= Linge =

River in the Betuwe, Netherlands

Coordinates: 51°50′N 4°59′E

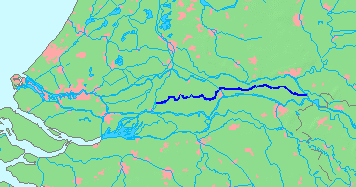
Location

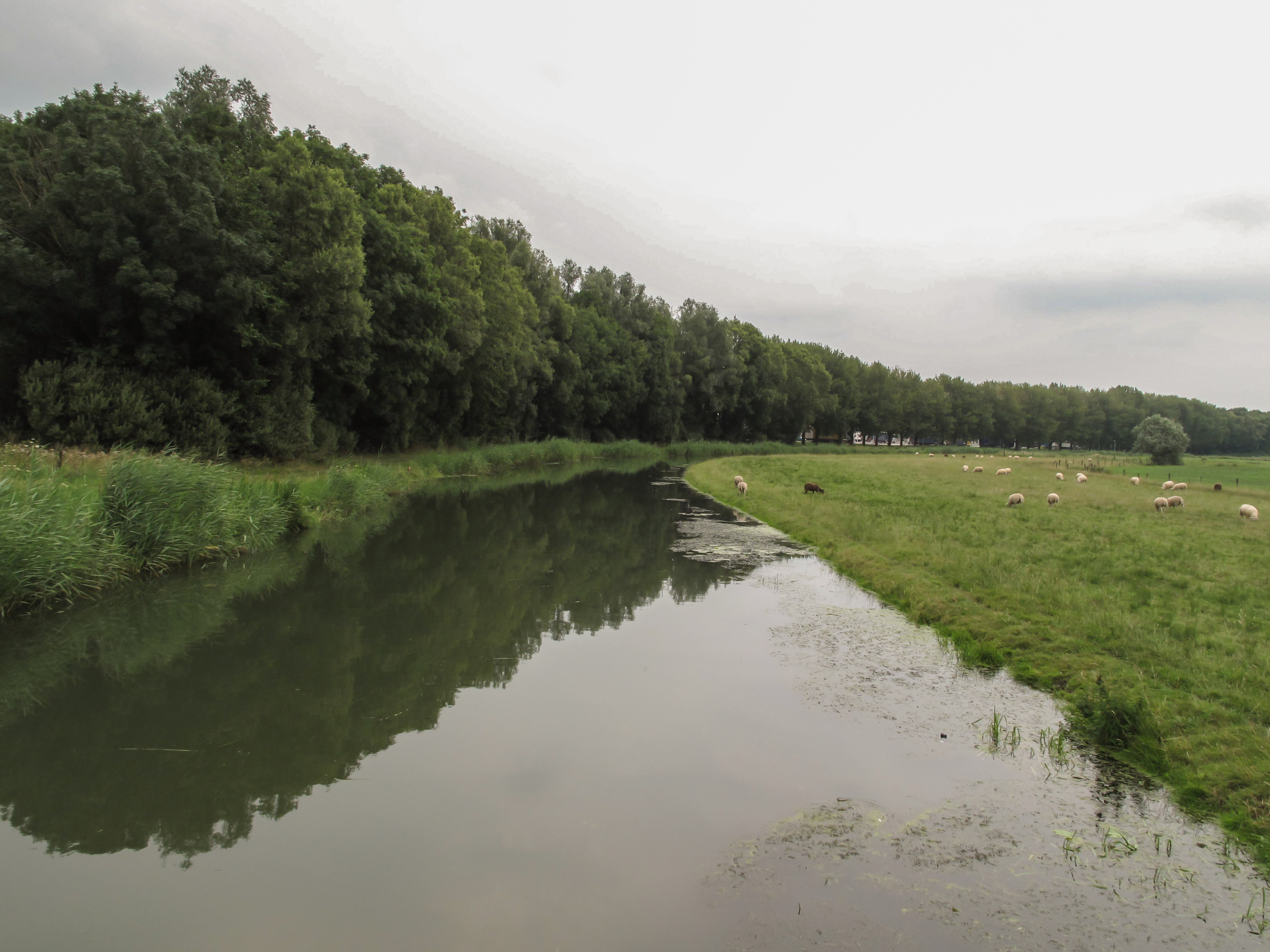
Linge river near Eldik

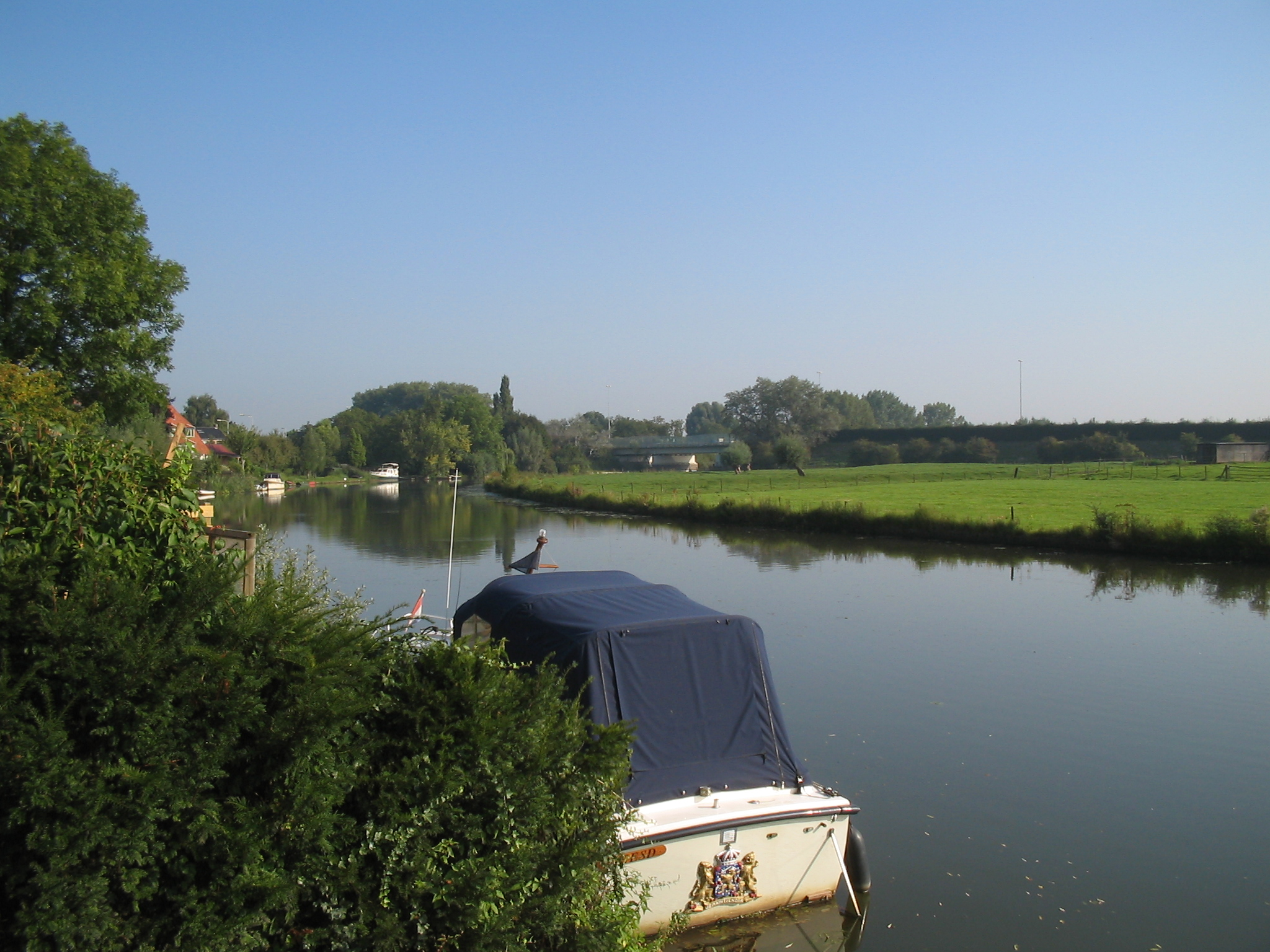
Linge river near Beesd

The Linge is a river in the Betuwe that is 99.8 km long, which makes it one of the longest rivers that flow entirely within the Netherlands.

The river starts near the village of Doornenburg near the German border. A legend tells us that if pigs no longer forage at the castle of Doornenburg, the river will dry up. The Linge flows to Zoelen, a small village north of Tiel, and from there it meanders west through the Betuwe, to empty in the Boven Merwede near Gorinchem. Until Geldermalsen, the river is little more than a small, canalised stream. From Geldermalsen on, however, it takes the appearance of a real river complete with dikes and small floodplains. The Linge provides idyllic spots at old towns like Asperen and Leerdam as the picturesque city walls are still in place on the banks of the river.

The river was once a branch of the river Waal, being cut off at Tiel in 1307 or thereabouts (some traces of this can still be seen). The river is navigable for small vessels and is a popular destination for boaters. The banks of the river are important breeding grounds for waterfowl.

This river used to be an important trade route in the olden days. This role has subsequently been taken over by the Rhine and Waal rivers.

Railroad bridges (with nearest train station on the left and right bank):

- between Elst and Arnhem
- between Opheusden and Kesteren
- between Kesteren and Tiel
- between Geldermalsen and Culemborg/Beesd

The river crosses seven motorways:

- Four times the A15 (Rotterdam-Nijmegen)
- Once the A2 (Utrecht-Eindhoven)
- Once the A50 (Arnhem-Eindhoven)
- Once the A325 (Arnhem-Nijmegen)

The riverbanks in the Betuwe are lined with apple orchards, which makes them popular with tourists, particularly in spring when the fruit trees are in blossom. In April, a walking tour is organised in support of the Red Cross, the so-called 'Rode Kruis Bloesemtocht'.
