= Flesh and Blood (1985 film) =

1985 film by Paul Verhoeven

Flesh+Blood
- Theatrical release poster by Renato Casaro
- Directed by: Paul Verhoeven
- Screenplay by: Gerard Soeteman; Paul Verhoeven
- Story by: Gerard Soeteman
- Produced by: Gijs Versluys
- Starring: Rutger Hauer; Jennifer Jason Leigh; Tom Burlinson; Susan Tyrrell; Ronald Lacey; Jack Thompson
- Cinematography: Jan de Bont
- Edited by: Ine Schenkkan
- Music by: Basil Poledouris
- Production companies: Riverside Pictures; Impala Studios
- Distributed by: Orion Pictures (United States); Cannon Tuschinski Film Distribution (Netherlands)
- Release dates: June 10, 1985 (SIFF); August 30, 1985 (United States)
- Running time: 126 minutes
- Countries: United States; Netherlands; Spain
- Language: English
- Budget: US$6.5 million
- Box office: US$100,000 (United States)

Flesh and Blood is a 1985 erotic historical adventure film directed by Paul Verhoeven, and starring Rutger Hauer, Jennifer Jason Leigh, Tom Burlinson, Susan Tyrrell, Ronald Lacey, Bruno Kirby and Jack Thompson. The script was written by Verhoeven and Gerard Soeteman. The story is set in 1501 in early modern Italy, and follows two warring groups of mercenaries and their longstanding quarrel.

The script is partly based on unused material for the Dutch television series Floris, which was the debut for Verhoeven, Soeteman and Hauer. The film, originally titled God's Own Butchers, was also known as The Rose and the Sword on early VHS releases. It was Verhoeven's first English-language film.

Upon its release in August 1985, Flesh and Blood was a box office bomb, earning only US$100,000 on a US$6.5 million production budget. The film has since garnered a small cult following. The director's biographer called it "a crucial Verhoeven film, because the fight between logic and spirituality is one that is very familiar to the director; these are the elements still fighting for priority in his own mind."

== Plot ==
In 1501, a city in Italy is taken over by while its rightful ruler, Arnolfini, is away. Arnolfini returns with mercenaries who he's promised 24 hours of looting if they succeed in retaking the city. When they succeed, their systematic rape and killing of his townspeople convinces Arnolfini he's made a mistake. He appeals to Hawkwood, the commander of the troops, to expel the mercenaries, promising to get medical attention for a young nun Hawkwood mistakenly wounded during the siege. Hawkwood betrays his former lieutenant, Martin, and leads Arnolfini's cavalry in ejecting the mercenaries from the city without their promised loot. When Martin's son is stillborn, the burial party for the dead infant unearths a wooden statue of Saint Martin of Tours, a saint with a sword. The mercenaries' chaplain views this as a sign from God to follow Martin as their new leader.

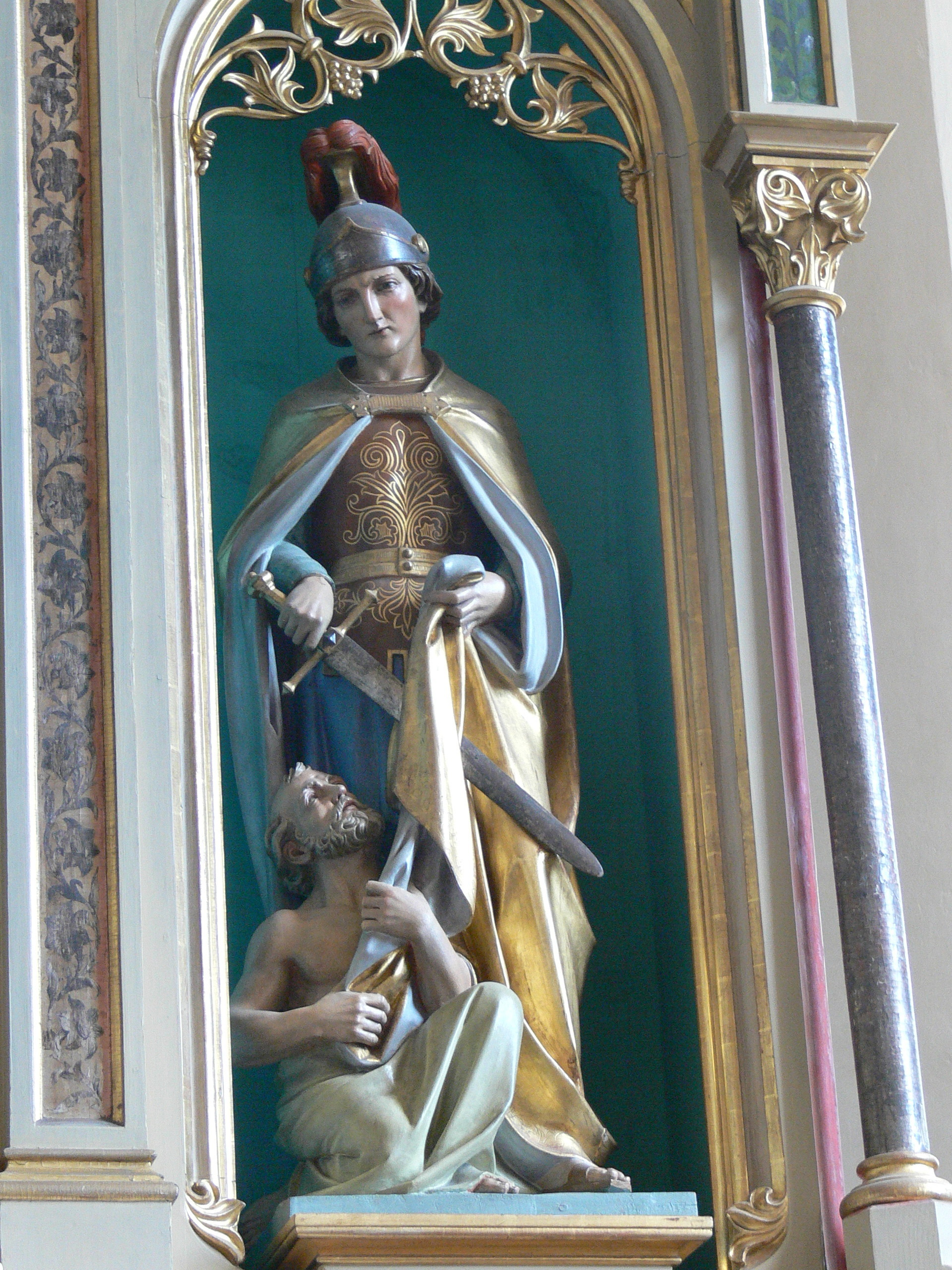
A statue of Saint Martin holding a sword

Arnolfini's son Steven meets Agnes and they eat from a mandrake whose magic makes them fall in love. Their wedding entourage is attacked and robbed by Martin's mercenary band. Arnolfini is seriously injured, Agnes' lady-in-waiting is killed, and Agnes is hauled away hidden amid her valuable dowry. Martin discovers Agnes when they strip the caravan of valuables, rapes Agnes in front of the caravan, and prevents his men from touching her. The mercenaries capture a castle with Agnes' help, and she seduces Martin, apparently having abandoned her former life.

Steven pleas for Hawkwood's help saving Agnes, but Hawkwood wants a quiet life married to the former nun. Steven, showing his father's ruthlessness, seizes her and forces Hawkwood's help pursuing Martin. Steven's force locates the castle and lay siege to it. Martin asks Agnes where her true loyalty lies, she responds that the winner takes all. The plague spreads among Steven's forces and infects Hawkwood. Steven builds a siege tower to storm the castle, and Martin destroys it, but Steven, alone breaches the wall with a scaling ladder. He's captured and shackled in the courtyard where he's abused by the garrison, including Agnes.

Hawkwood cures the besieging army using a new medical technique Steven learned, cutting the buboes on the infected body, but cannot continue the siege without additional troops. He and the physician, Father George, catapult pieces of an infected dog into the castle. Steven, still chained, is able to throw a piece the castle's water well with Agnes' knowledge, as a test of her loyalty. Martin persuades the mercenaries not to leave the castle, despite the plague, and Agnes watches as Martin's men drink the infected water. She slaps a cup from Martin's hand, and his sickened men blame him and throw him down the well.

Steven needs Martin's key to escape from the shackles, and Martin needs Steven's help to escape the well. Martin escapes the well to find Hawkwood and Arnolfini, recovered from their wounds, have returned with reinforcements to assault the castle. Martin flees to the belfry. Using a lightning storm to strike the chain, Steven frees himself and, as the battle rages, races to find Agnes. During the fighting, the belfry catches fire and most of the mercenaries are killed.

Martin confronts Agnes, who claims that she loves him. He tries to strangle her so she can't return to Steven, but Steven intervenes. Martin overpowers Steven and almost drowns him, but Agnes strikes Martin on the head. She flees with Steven from the blazing castle and reunite with Hawkwood. As Agnes and Steven embrace, Agnes sees Martin over Steven's shoulder, escaping from the castle, a sack of loot on his shoulder. She says nothing.

== Cast ==
- Rutger Hauer as Martin, mercenary leader
- Jennifer Jason Leigh as Agnes, virgin daughter of an aristocrat
- Tom Burlinson as Steven, learned son of Arnolfini
- Jack Thompson as Hawkwood, a captain of mercenaries
- Fernando Hilbeck as Arnolfini, feudal lord
- Susan Tyrrell as Celine, a drunken prostitute attached to Martin
- Ronald Lacey as Cardinal, a visionary
- Brion James as Karsthans, a mercenary
- Bruno Kirby as Orbec, a mercenary
- Simon Andreu as Miel, a mercenary
- John Dennis Johnston as Summer, a mercenary
- Marina Saura as Polly, a prostitute
- Kitty Courbois as Anna
- Jake Wood as Little John, Anna's son
- Nancy Cartwright as Kathleen, Agnes's lady-in-waiting
- Héctor Alterio as Niccolo
- Blanca Marsillach as Clara
- Jorge Bosso as Sterz
- Mario De Barros as Herman
- Hans Veerman as Father George, a physician
- Ida Bons as Roly Poly
- Jaime Segura as Lord of the Castle
- Bettina Brenner as Lady of the Castle
- Siobhan Hayes as Child of the Castle
- Susan Beresford as Sturdy Woman
- Monica Lucchetti as Tongueless Girl
- Anne Lockhart as Wife

== Production ==
=== Development ===
By the early 1980s Paul Verhoeven had established himself as the highest profile Dutch filmmaker in the world. He received Hollywood offers including one from Orion Pictures who wanted him to make something like Soldier of Orange. Verhoeven had had a project on file since 1970, a fifty page outline from Gerard Soeteman called The Mercenaries or God's Own Butchers about mercenaries who are fired by their financial backer, a Duke. One of the mercenaries abducts the betrothed of the Duke's son, and the son and another mercenary go to retrieve her. The story was inspired by The Wild Bunch, Floris, Vera Cruz and The Crimson Pirate, particularly The Wild Bunch. Verhoeven recalled:

Jack Thompson was the lieutenant and Rutger was the sergeant. And after the conquering of this city, they were divided. The one that was thrown out becomes a robber; the other one has to fight him. It was these two people that were friends—and they have to fight and kill each other, more or less. That was basically the issue: two people that like each other—love each other, whatever you want – and have to fight each other, for different reasons. And they cannot escape their destiny. The girl [Jennifer Jason Leigh] was just a minor element.

Orion Pictures agreed to finance $7 million. However, Orion soon requested changes, feeling that the film needed a love interest; thus, instead of focusing on the relationship between Hawkwood and Martin, Agnes was introduced and attention turned to her romantic entanglement with both Martin and Steven. Verhoeven later said: "Now we come to the film, where the girl is in the middle—Tom Burlinson on one side and Rutger on the other—and Jack Thompson is a completely minor character. So instead of this interesting Wild Bunch theme, we ended up with a triangle where this girl is manipulating two guys." The director elaborated, "The failure of Flesh and Blood was a lesson for me: never again compromise on the main story line of a script."

Orion were happy with Rutger Hauer to play the lead but suggested Nastassja Kinski or Rebecca de Mornay as Agnes. Mornay would only make the film if then boyfriend Tom Cruise was cast as Steven. Verhoeven cast Jennifer Jason Leigh, who had impressed him in Fast Times at Ridgemount High, as Agnes and Australian actor Tom Burlinson as Steven. It was Burlinson's first international film and he called it "Very different in content and style to ‘'Snowy' and Phar Lap. Not really my kind of movie, but it has quite a large cult following."

The movie featured another Australian actor, Jack Thompson.

=== Shooting ===
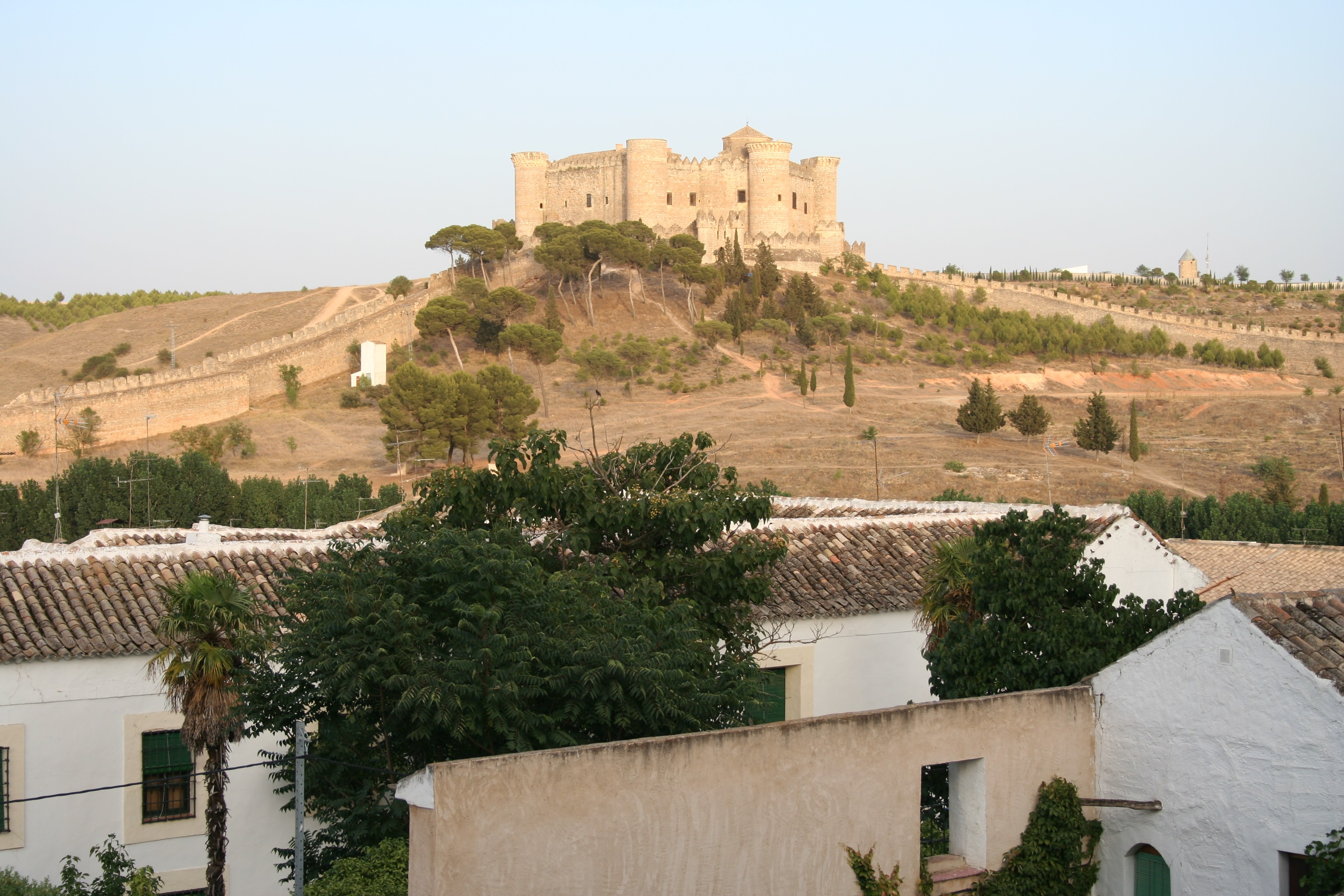
The Castle of Belmonte

Flesh and Blood was shot in Spain, in Belmonte (Cuenca), Cáceres and Ávila.

Filming was extremely difficult. "It was agony all the way," recalled Verhoeven. "What a mess! I have never felt so unhappy as with Flesh + Blood. It just made me livid if something did not work – and hardly anything did. The computer in my head became completely overloaded." Actor Brion James regarded the film's production as "probably the worst experience of my life" due to Verhoeven's direction, bad weather conditions, and several of the cast and crew being ill during filming.

In addition to a cast featuring American, Australian, British, Spanish and Dutch actors, attempting to handle an international co-production funded by multiple sources who all wanted to take the film in different directions overwhelmed Verhoeven, who had also not storyboarded the film in a bid to achieve a "looser visual approach". There were a number of delays and disagreements because of the subsequent improvisational style of filming; many members of the cast and crew also arrived and left when they pleased to party on a local beach.

One of the most notable disagreements was between Verhoeven and Hauer, who wanted to cultivate a reputation for playing heroic characters rather than villains, as he did in Ridley Scott's Blade Runner (1982). This was at odds with Verhoeven's intent to portray the moral ambiguity of its characters and the Middle Ages as a "stinking time in which to live" to distance it from typical medieval fantasy depictions of the period. This caused a bitter rift to develop between the two, who did not work together again. In December 1984 after filming Hauer told a journalist "What he does is use my charisma and personality for his smut. It really is two-dimensional. It is fucking, beer-drinking and fucking. Other than that, nothing happens. Not in one of his films. That Soldaat van Oranje rises above that level can be easily attributed to me."

In 1991 Verhoeven admitted "our relationship and friendship was ruined during that picture. We hated each other so much at the end of the picture that it’s going to take a couple of years to bring us together." He later reflected:

I would say he was an asshole, because he had changed so much... and he was not the same guy anymore. And Rutger probably would say, “Paul was so insecure, because it was his first American movie, that he couldn’t direct me anymore.” Yeah? So we have two very good reasons, two ways of looking at things. And it would be not realistic to say that my version is the best one. [Laughs]... We always got in arguments. I wanted him to play it lighter. My version of the movie was more like Burt Lancaster in The Crimson Pirate. Chk-chk! Much more buoyant. And it never got to that; it was always heavy and straight.

Some of the film was censored, including the rape sequence. This upset Jennifer Jason Leigh, who was opposed to censorship. "It's a hard scene to watch," she said. "Brutal and ugly as rape is, I know it's going to upset a lot of people. But the film is extraordinary. Paul Verhoeven is so gifted."

Flesh and Blood's musical score was composed by Basil Poledouris, conducting the London Symphony Orchestra. La-La Land Records released an extended CD of the score in 2013 with almost twice as much music as the original 1985 LP/CD release by Varèse Sarabande.

== Release ==
Though the film received worldwide release in the summer of 1985, in the United States, Orion Pictures gave the film a limited theatrical release on August 16, 1985, in Los Angeles and New York City. Thus, the film did not gross a large amount in the country, and by most accounts, performed poorly. By 1986, the film was showing in the U.S. on HBO, a business partner of Orion Pictures.

== Reception ==
=== Box office ===
Verhoeven has hypothesized on the reasons for the film's failure at the American box office in the years since its release, including statements that it was "too cynical and downbeat" to be a hit. Professor of film and literature at California Polytechnic State University Douglas Keesey suggested that the film had "no hero to root for and no happy fantasy element to lighten its unpleasantly realistic depiction of the Middle Ages".

The film's financial failure caused Verhoeven to move to the United States in September 1985 in order to better understand American culture and what films would be suited to its audience. In addition to this, his previous films, notably Spetters (1980), had been protested by members of the Dutch public and it had become difficult to gain financing to shoot productions in his home country.

However the film was admired by Arnold Schwarzennegger and was a key reason, along with Robocop, why the actor asked to work with Verhoeven on Total Recall.

=== Critical response ===
Although unsuccessful at the box office upon release, the film has become a critical and cult favorite. It maintains an 82% approval rating on the review aggregator Rotten Tomatoes based on 22 reviews, with a weighted average of 6.1/10. Metacritic, which uses a weighted average, assigned the film a score of 56 out of 100, based on 7 critics, indicating "mixed or average" reviews. Audiences polled by CinemaScore gave the film an average grade of "C" on an A+ to F scale.

Hauer later said "I thought the script was a weak, pornographic medieval adventure - I thought it should have been done differently. I wanted to have better scenes, and I was promised them too. But because the wife of scriptwriter Gerard Soeteman fell ill, those improvements never materialized. It all became very malicious."

Noel Murray of The A.V. Club wrote in his review: "From the start of his career, Dutch director Paul Verhoeven has mostly focused on making violent, sexy genre pieces—often punishing, often absurd, and always placed in the context of a moralistic pessimism. Verhoeven’s 1985 English-language film debut Flesh and Blood wallows in mud and misery, with Rutger Hauer playing an early-16th-century mercenary who leads a troupe of undesirables in a revolt against a deadbeat lord, and Jennifer Jason Leigh playing a virginal lady who’s kidnapped by the rebels and becomes Hauer’s (mostly) willing mate."

== Cultural impact ==
The movie inspired Berserk creator Kentaro Miura, who said in a 2003 interview when he won the Tezuka Osamu Cultural Prize's Award for Excellence (2002) that he based the design of Berserk protagonist Guts on the character Martin as portrayed by actor Rutger Hauer.

== Bibliography ==
- Keesey, Douglas (2005). Paul Verhoevene. Taschen Film. Cologne: Taschen. pp. 86–93. ISBN 978-3822831014.
- Fischer, Dennis (2011). Science Fiction Film Directors, 1895-1998 (Revised ed.). New York City: McFarland & Company. p. 633. ISBN 978-0786460915.
- Maltin, Leonard (2017). The Encyclopedia of Fantastic Film: Ali Baba to Zombiese (Reprint ed.). New York City: Plume. p. 475. ISBN 978-0525536192.
- Scheers, Rob van (1997). Paul Verhoeven. Faber.
- Young, R. G., ed. (2000). The Encyclopedia of Fantastic Film: Ali Baba to Zombies (1st ed.). Lanham, Maryland: Applause Theatre & Cinema Books. p. 218. ISBN 978-1557832696.
