= Doornenburg =

- Village
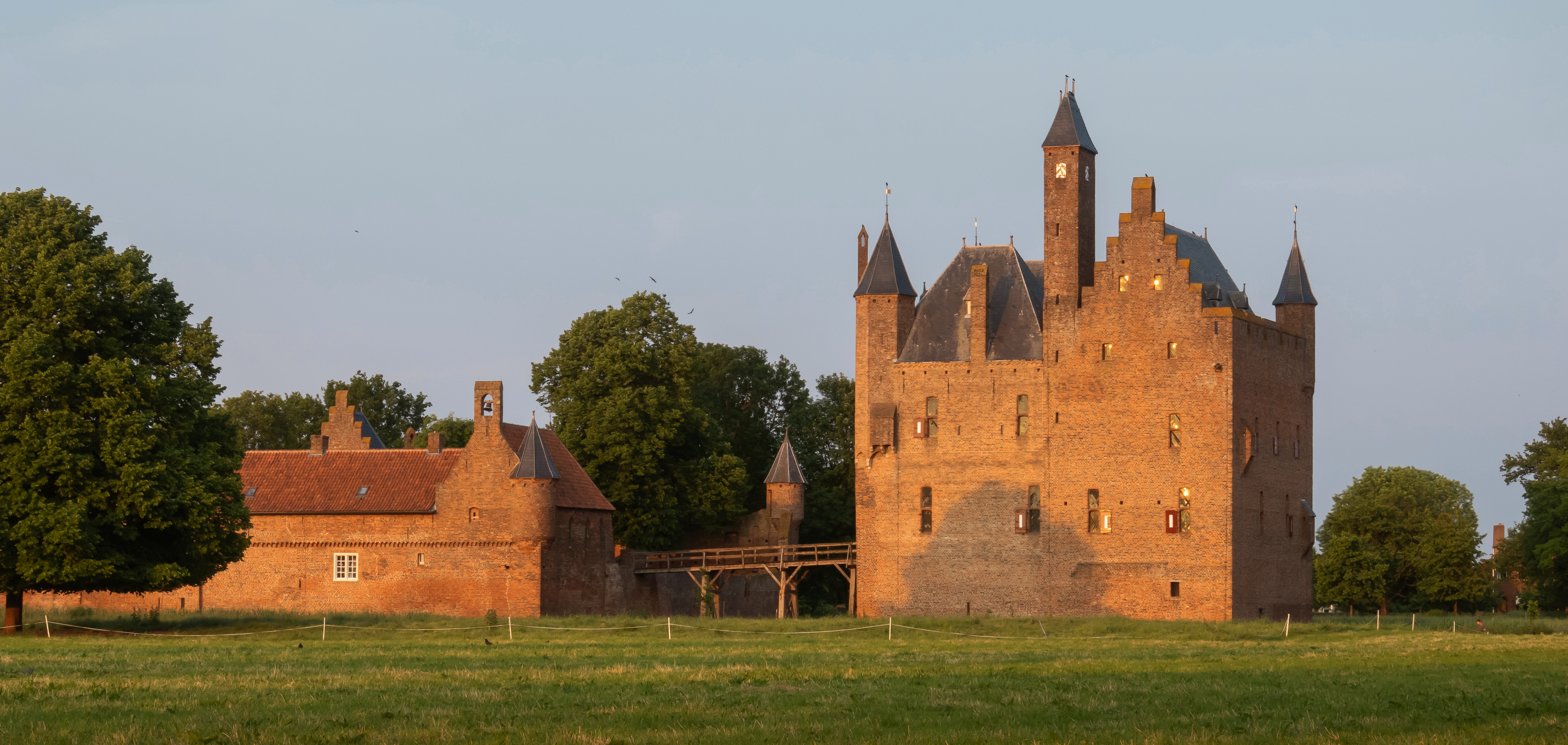
- Doornenburg Castle

- Flag

- Location in the province of Gelderland in the Netherlands Doornenburg (Netherlands)
- Coordinates: 51°53′18″N 5°59′57″E
- Country: Netherlands
- Province: Gelderland
- Municipality: Lingewaard

Area
  - Total: 8.41 km^{2} (3.25 sq mi)
- Elevation: 11 m (36 ft)

Population (2021)
  - Total: 2,740
  - Density: 326/km^{2} (844/sq mi)
- Time zone: UTC+1 (CET)
  - Summer (DST): UTC+2 (CEST)
- Postal code: 6686
- Dialing code: 0481

Doornenburg (Dutch pronunciation: [ˈdoːrnə(m)bʏr(ə)x]) is a village to the south east of Angeren in the municipality of Lingewaard, Gelderland, the Netherlands. Doornenburg Castle is located near the village.

== History ==
The village was first mentioned in the 9th century as Doronburc, and means fortified place and either thorns or the Doro (person)". Doornenburg developed on a ridge in the Early Middle Ages.

Doornenburg Castle started in the 14th century as a castle in front of a large square. During the 15th and 16th century, the square was aligned with buildings. The outer bailey was constructed in the 15th century and is the largest of the Netherlands. The castle and its buildings were restored between 1937 and 1941 and returned to their medieval form. In 1945, it was severely damaged and restored between 1947 and 1968.

In 1742, a fort was built on the Pannerdens Kanaal, however only fragments remain. In 1939, seven casemates were built near the fort.

Doornenburg was home to 629 people in 1840. The village was evacuated on 12 October 1944. The church tower was blown up by German soldiers on 27 December 1944 and the village remained in German hands until 2 April 1945.

== Gallery ==
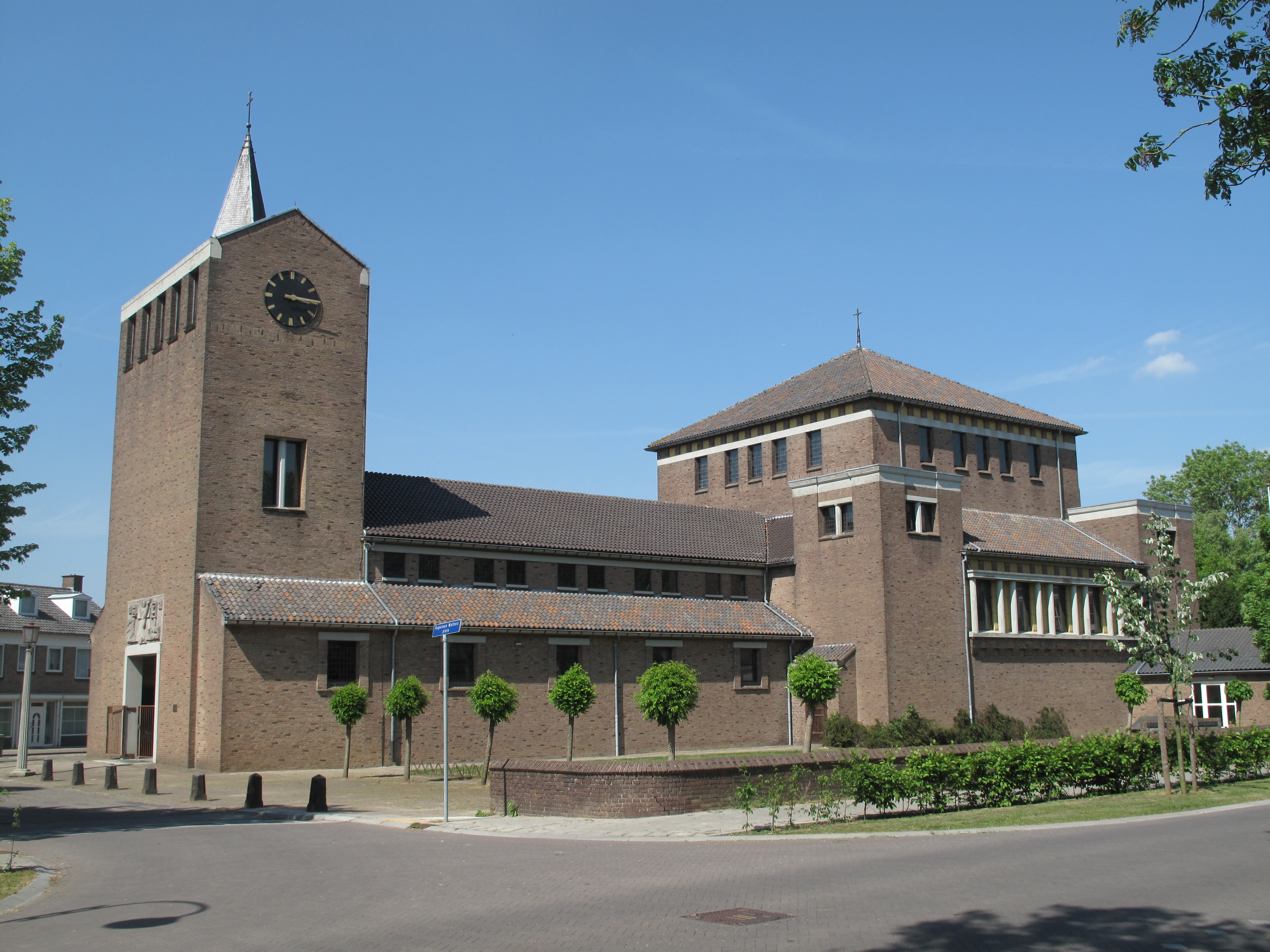
Doornenburg, church

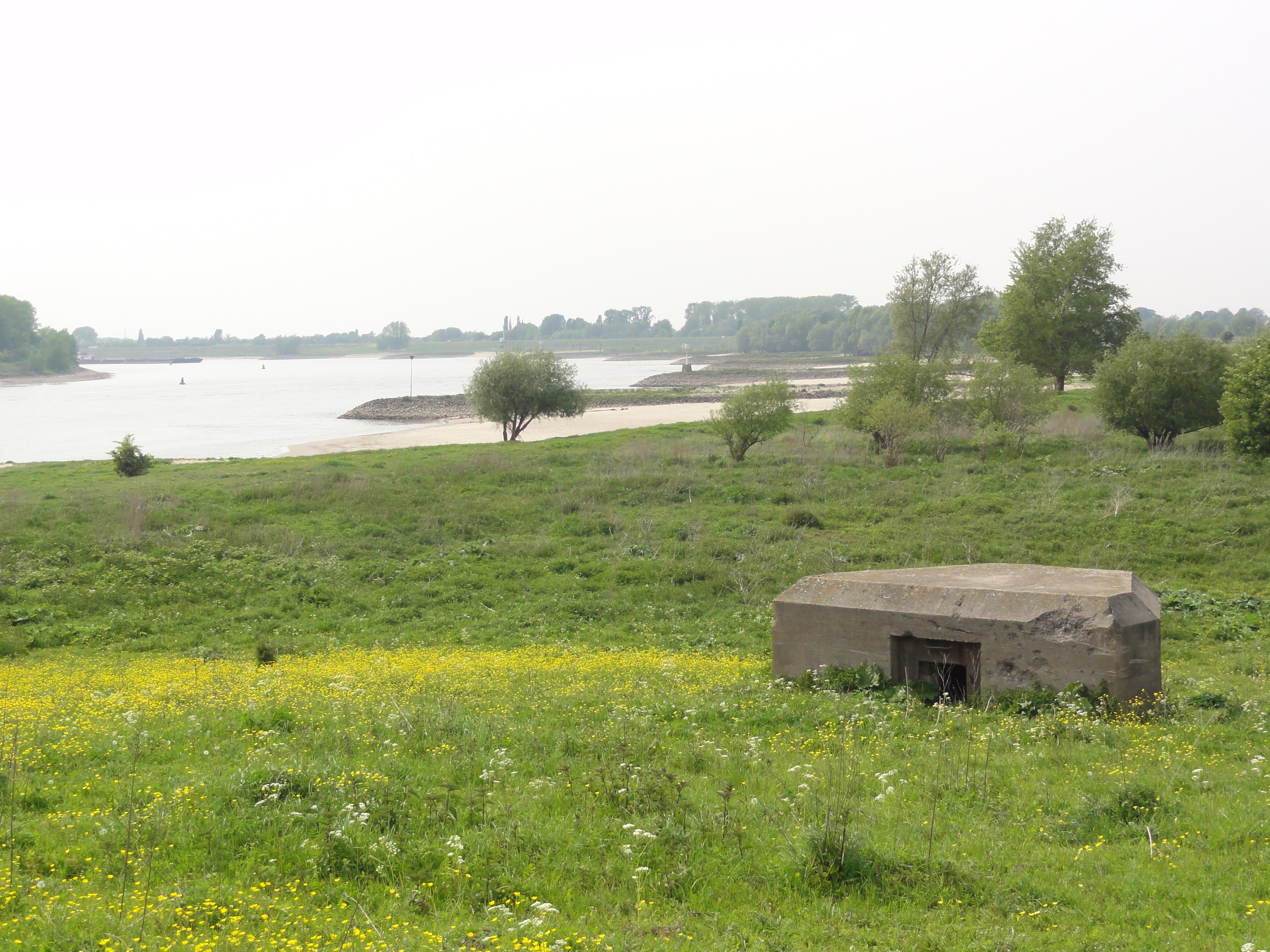
Fort Pannerden bunker

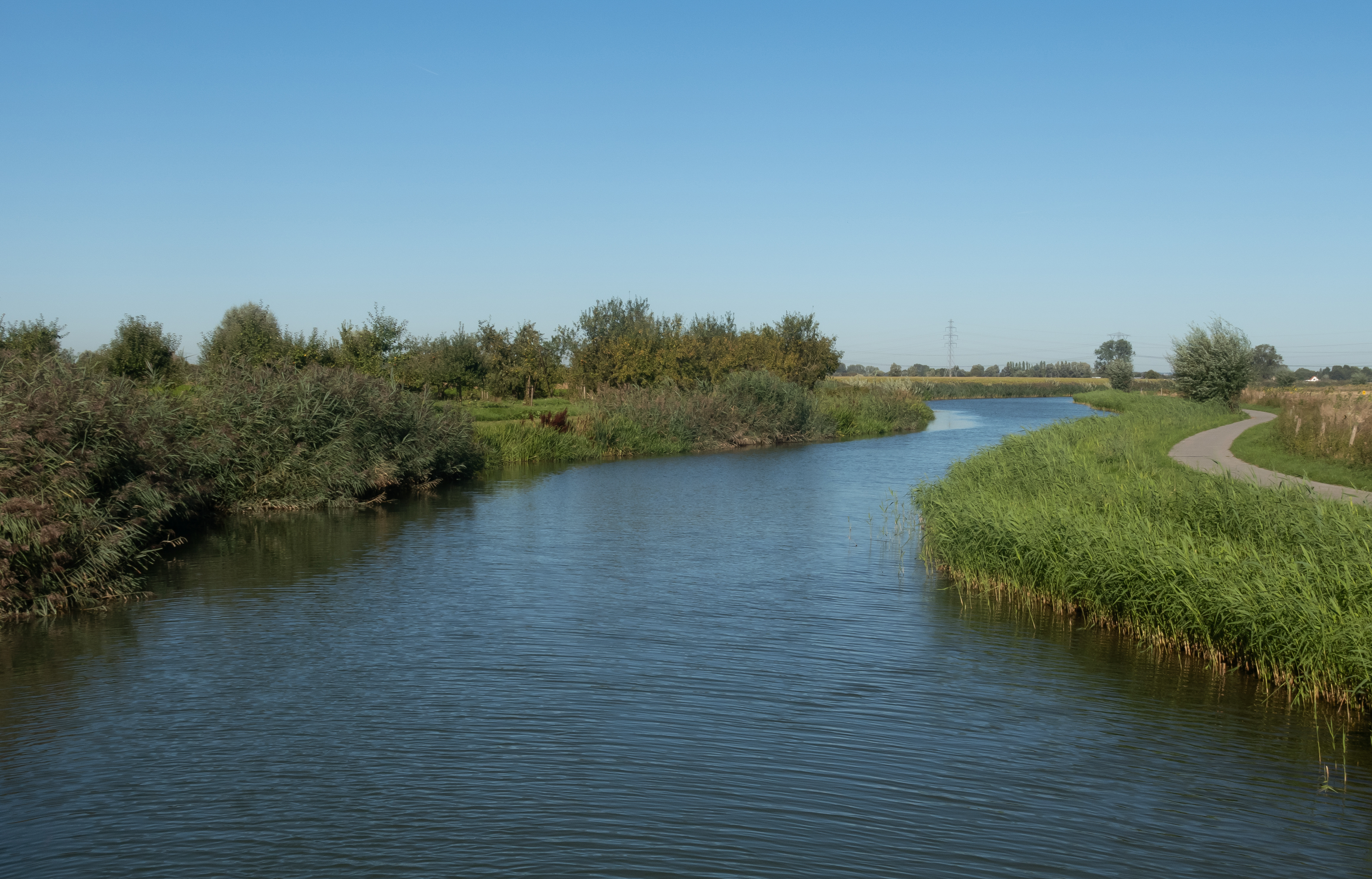
near Doornenburg, the Linge
