= Kinkelenburg Castle =

Dutch castle

Coordinates: 51°53′22.56″N 5°53′46.2″E

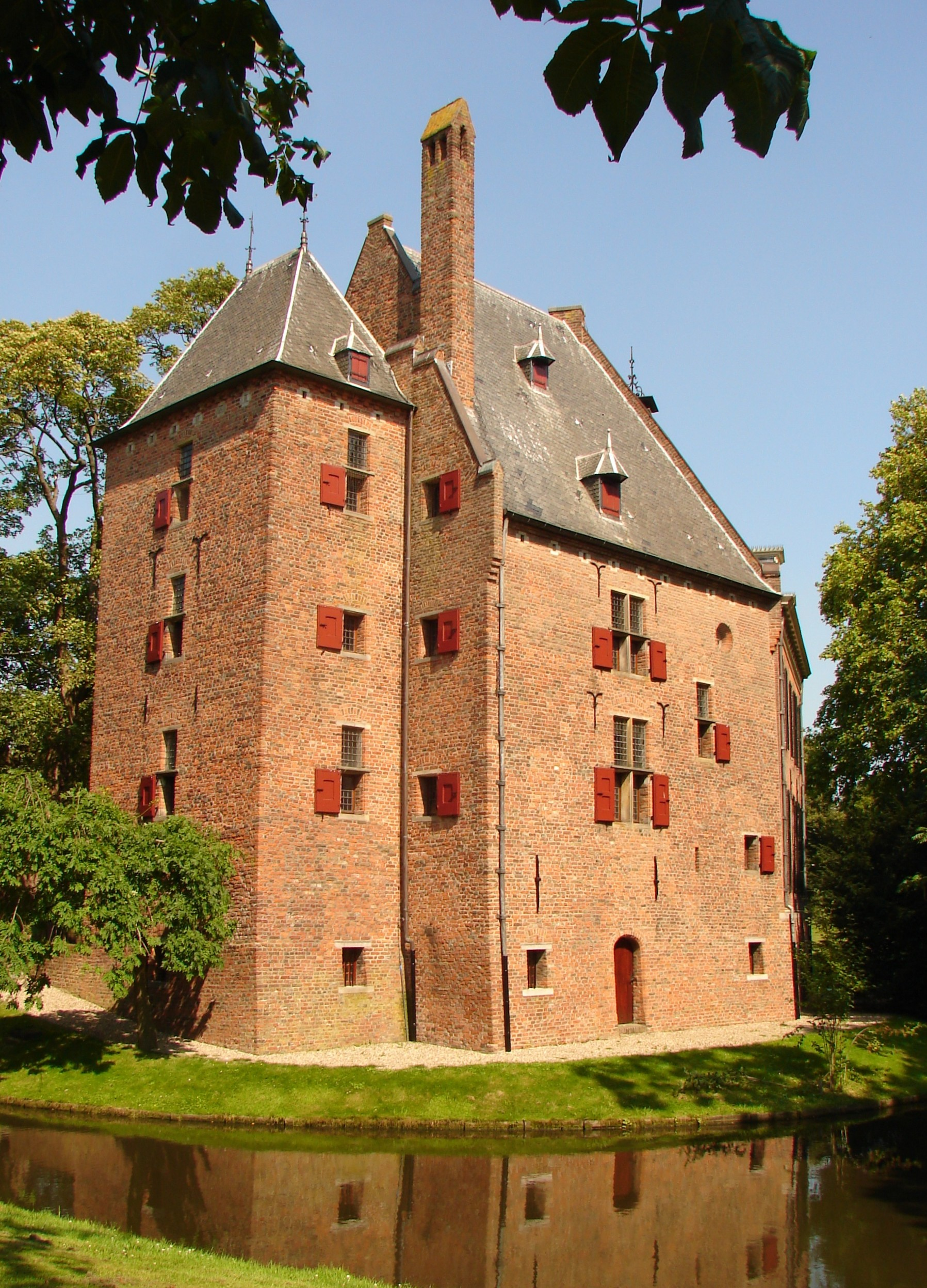
Side view of the oldest part of the building

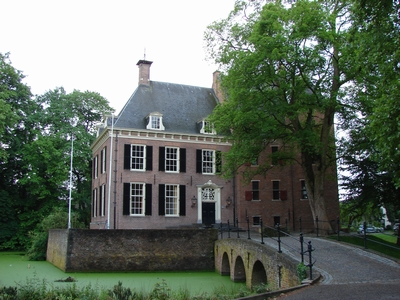
Vooraanzicht van De Kinkelenburg, met links de nieuwbouw.

Kinkelenburg Castle is a castle in Bemmel, north of Nijmegen, in the municipality of Lingewaard in the Dutch province of Gelderland.

== History ==
Probably in the 13th century a walled island was built on a low part of Bemmel, surrounded by a canal. A keep was built on this island. The house was first mentioned in 1403 when Johan van Ambe inhabited the house. The attached gate tower may date from the same period. Somewhere in the 16th and 17th centuries, the towers were connected by a building. In 1765 the house was expanded with a wing. It is unknown where the name Kinkelenburg comes from.

The castle was converted into a villa by private individuals in the 19th century and lost its medieval character. The last private owners and residents were members of the Homan van der Heide family from 1917 to 1948 who sold the castle to the municipality of Bemmel in that last year. During the Second World War the house was used as an emergency hospital. It was restored in the 1950s under Charles Estourgie Jr.

Today, the Kinkelenburg is a wedding and meeting location of the municipality of Lingewaard.

== Gallery ==
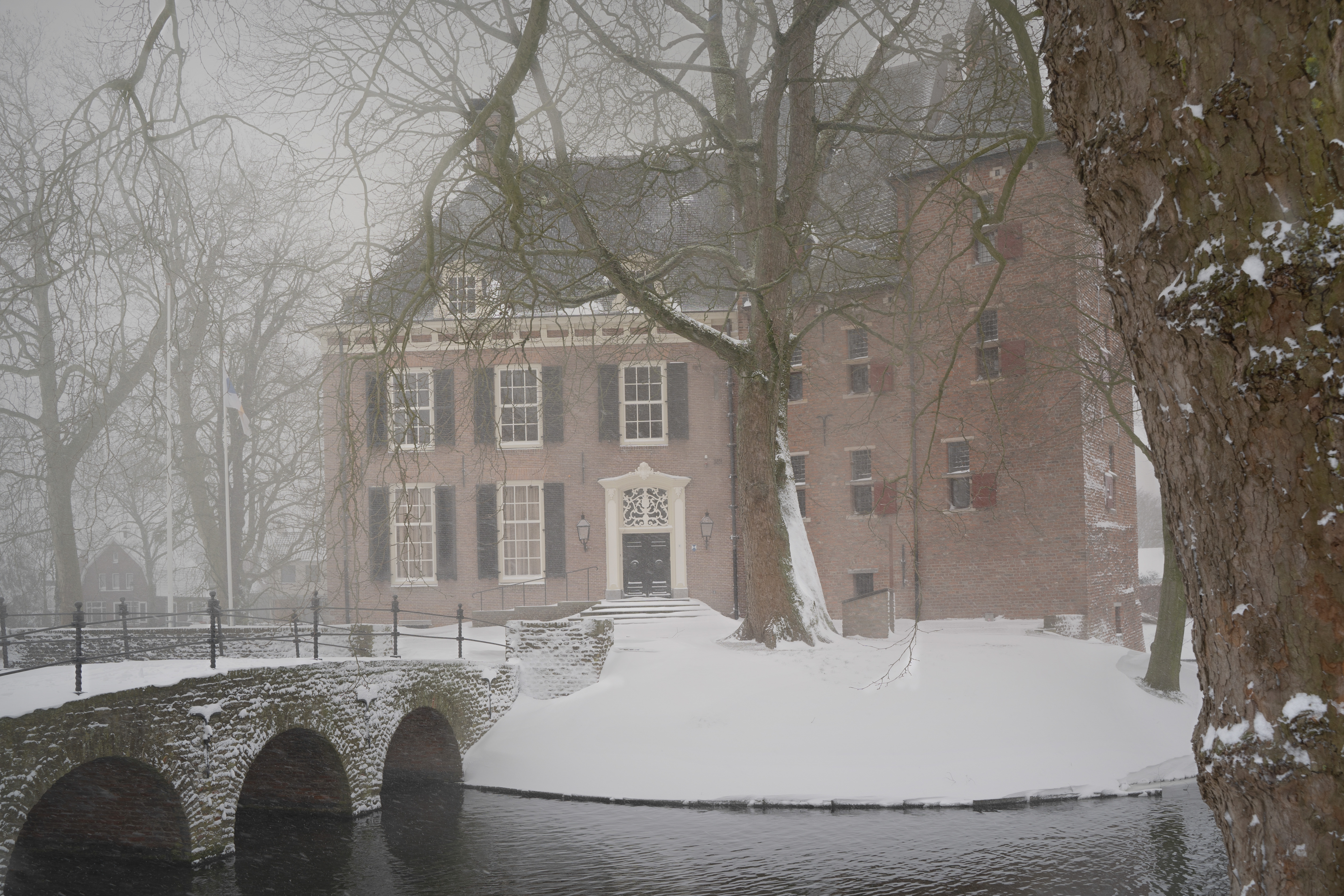
The castle during the winter of 2021

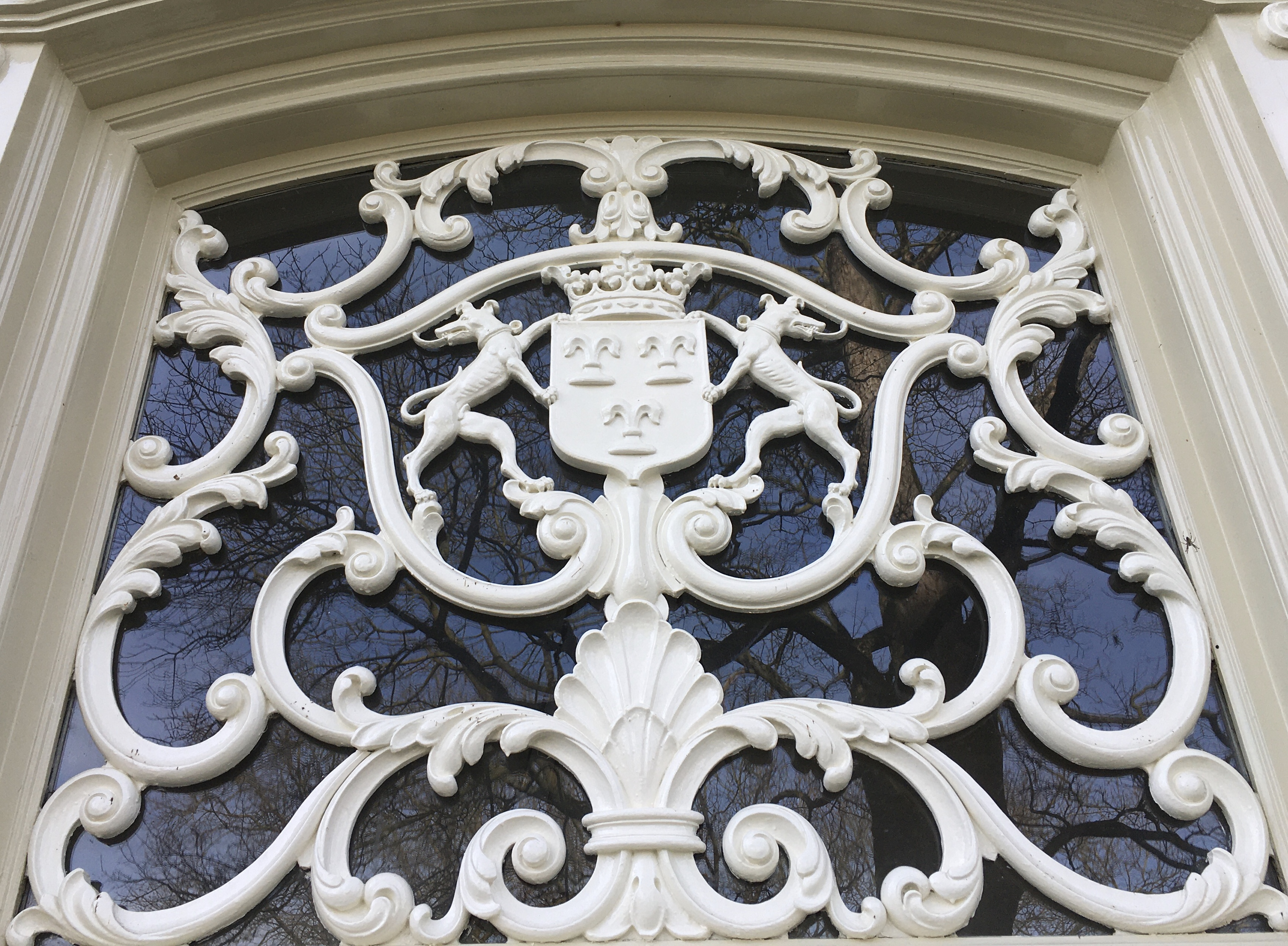
The town symbol of Bemmel above the door of the castle

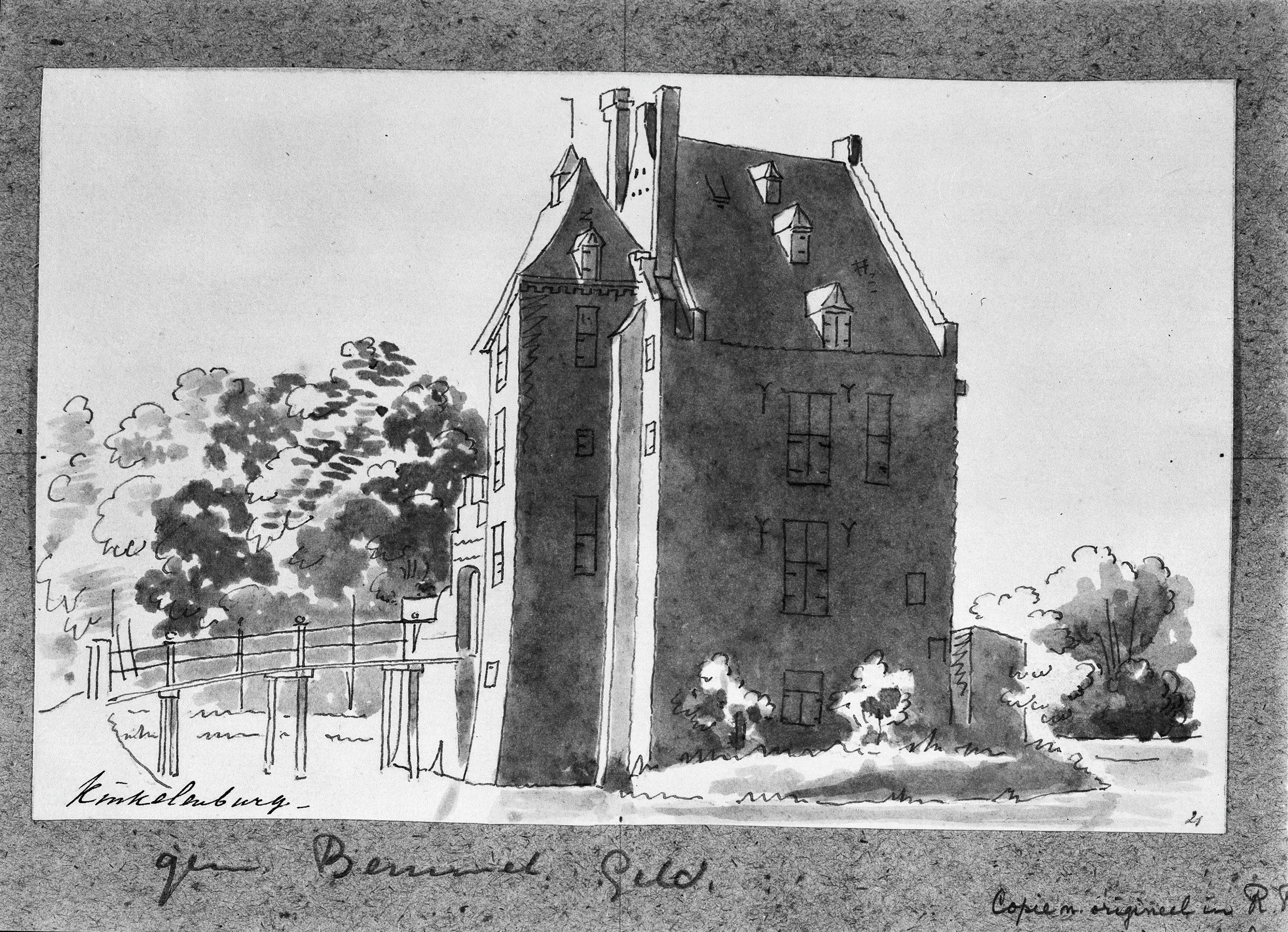
Drawing of the castle

== See also ==
- Doornenburg Castle
- List of castles in the Netherlands
