= Peter Bos =

Dutch film, stage and television actor

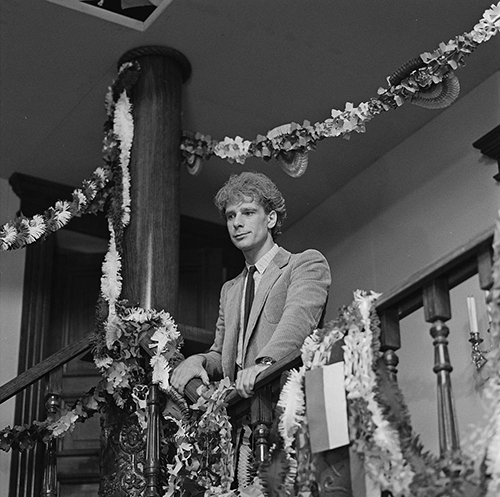
- Peter Bos in De Zevensprong
- Born: 20 June 1950 (age 75); Amsterdam
- Other names: Peter Noland

Petrus Andreas Maria (Peter) Bos (born 20 June 1950 in Amsterdam) is a Dutch film, stage and television actor best known for his role in the 1982 children's television series De Zevensprong in which he played the leading part as the teacher Frans van der Steg. He is also known from the children's film Knokken voor twee (directed by Karst van der Meulen) which was released in the same year.

== Filmography ==
=== Television ===
- De zevensprong (13 episodes, 1982) as Frans van der Steg
- Zondag weet je alles (1985) as Andre
- De wandelaar (1989) as Simon Veldman
- Uit de school geklapt (1992) as Joop de Wit

=== Film ===
- Knokken voor twee (1982) as Walter (English title: Three is a Crowd)
- Man in de war (1984) as Henk Berkhout
- Mama is boos! (1986) as Albert Koning K.P.R.
- De finales (1990) as Vader van Abe
- Romeo (1990) as Kennis op bezoek
- De bunker (1992) as Dekker
- Het schaduwrijk (1993) as Paul Curzon
