= Hans Kemna =

Dutch casting director and actor (1940–2024)

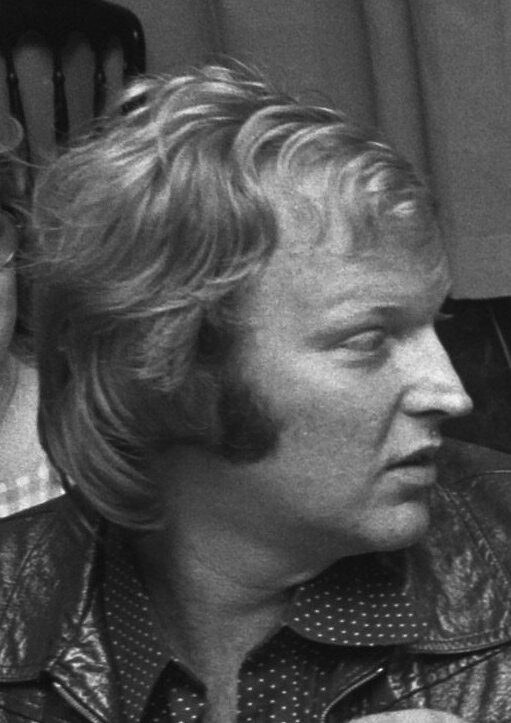
- Kemna in 1972
- Born: 5 March 1940; Rotterdam, Netherlands
- Died: 27 October 2024 (aged 84); Amsterdam, Netherlands
- Occupations: Casting director; actor
- Spouse: Adrian Brine (m. 2000; died 2006)

Hans Kemna (5 March 1940 – 27 October 2024) was a Dutch casting director and actor.

== Life and career ==
Kemna was born in Rotterdam on 5 March 1940. His father was chairman of a theater company. After high school he attended the Amsterdam Theater School. Kemna was a prominent and one of the first casting directors in the Netherlands. Kemna founded Hanse Kemna Casting in 1970, (after 1980 Kemna Casting and later Post Castelijn Casting). As an actor he played some supporting roles in movies and television series, including in Floris, Turkish Delight, Baantjer and Kinderen geen bezwaar.

Kemna won the Gouden Kalf in 2005 for his 'important contribution to Dutch film culture' awarded by Medy van der Laan. He was awarded the Rembrandt Award in 2012.

Kemna was together with British-Dutch actor and director Adrian Brine for fifty years. They married in 2000 as one of the first male couples. Brine died in 2006. Kemna died in Amsterdam on 27 October 2024, at the age of 84.
