= Dolf de Vries =

Dutch actor (1937–2020)

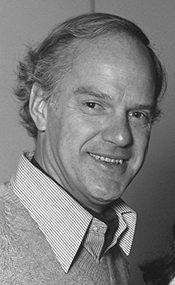
Dolf de Vries in 1981

Dolf de Vries (11 July 1937 – 5 December 2020) was a Dutch actor from The Hague.

De Vries was best known for his television appearances, especially for his role as Verhulst in Dossier Verhulst (1986–87). He also appeared in several of Paul Verhoeven's best-known films, such as Black Book and Soldier of Orange.

In his spare time he wrote plays and travel books. He died, aged 83, at his home in The Hague.

== Filmography ==
Year	Title	Role	Notes
1973	Turkish Delight	Paul	
1976	Max Havelaar of de koffieveilingen der Nederlandsche handelsmaatschappij	Hendrickx	
1977	Het debuut	Dr. Peter Sanders	
1977	Soldier of Orange	Jacques ten Brinck	
1981	Te gek om los te lopen	Robert	
1981	Hoge hakken, echte liefde	John	
1982	A Question of Silence	Boutique owner	
1982	Het verleden		
1983	The Fourth Man	Dr. de Vries	
1985	Het bittere kruid	Dijter van Gelder	
1987	Bygones	Johan	
1990	Ava and Gabriel: A Love Story	Bishop Hildebrand	
1991	Intensive Care	Hank	
1992	De Bunker	Ferguson	
2006	Brüder III – Auf dem Jakobsweg	Arie, the Dutchman	
2006	Black Book	Mr. Smaal	
2012	Milo	Lucas Mulder	
