= De Bunker =

1992 film

- Directed by: Gerard Soeteman
- Written by: Gerard Soeteman
- Release date: 1 October 1992
- Running time: 105 minutes
- Country: Netherlands
- Language: Dutch

De Bunker is a 1992 Dutch drama film directed by Gerard Soeteman.

== Cast ==
- Thom Hoffman ... Gerrit Kleinveld
- Huub van der Lubbe ... Wolting
- Dolf de Vries ... Ferguson
- Geert Lageveen ... Schrander
- Gijs de Lange ... Demani
- Peter Bos ... Dekker
- Cas Enklaar ... Van Zalingen
- Ids van der Krieken ... Van der Groep
- Fred Goessens ... Freekenhorst
- Jaap Maarleveld ... Van der Stam
- Jack Wouterse ... Ritter
- Kees Campfens ... Franzka
- Rik van Uffelen ... Noppen
- Han Kerkhoffs ... Flipse
- Boris Gerrets ... Horak
