= Gerard Soeteman =

Dutch screenwriter (1936–2025)

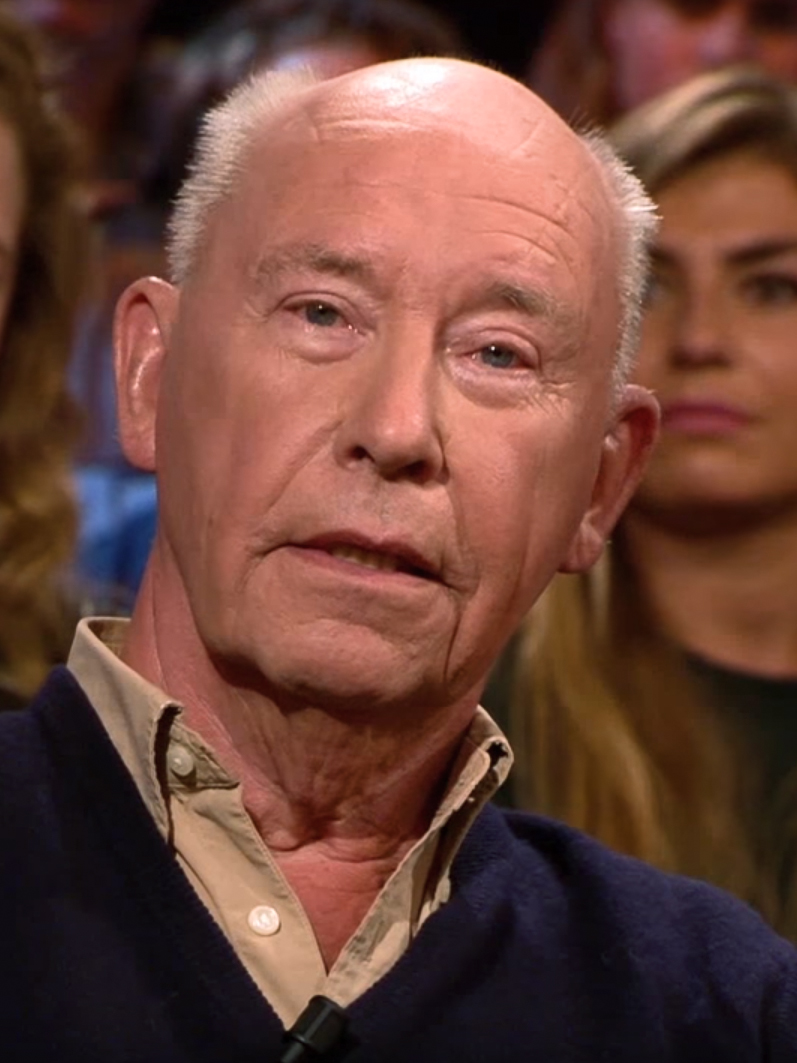
Soeteman in 2017

Gerard Soeteman (1 July 1936 – 16 May 2025) was a Dutch screenwriter and comics writer. Some comics were based on the unproduced second series of his television series Floris. He worked together with Paul Verhoeven on several films, such as Turkish Delight and Black Book. He also wrote the screenplay for The Assault, which won the Academy Award for Best Foreign Language Film in 1986.

Soeteman died on 16 May 2025, at the age of 88.

== Television credits ==
- Floris (1969)

== Film credits ==
- Business Is Business (1971)
- Turkish Delight (1973)
- Katie Tippel (1975)
- Max Havelaar (1976)
- Soldier of Orange (1977)
- The Judge's Friend (1979)
- Spetters (1980)
- All Things Pass (1981)
- The Fourth Man (1983)
- Flesh & Blood (1985)
- The Assault (1986)
- The Bunker (1992) Also director.
- Claim (2002)
- Floris (2004)
- Black Book (2006)
