= Arend Hauer =

Dutch actor and drama teacher (1909–1985)

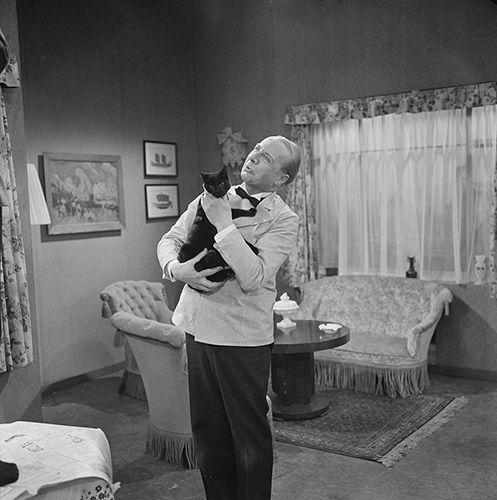
- Hauer on Vrouwtje Bezemsteel (1965)
- Born: 14 September 1909; Utrecht, Netherlands
- Died: 27 January 1985 (aged 75); Amsterdam, Netherlands
- Occupation: Actor
- Years active: 1936–1985
- Spouse: Teunke Mellema
- Children: 4, including Rutger Hauer

Arend Hauer (14 September 1909 – 27 January 1985) was a Dutch actor and drama teacher who appeared in several stage, television and radio dramas. He was the father of actor and environmentalist Rutger Hauer.

== Filmography ==
=== Television ===
- De Duivelsgrot (1963-1964)
- De kleine waarheid (1970-1972)
- Oorlogswinter (1975)
