= Doornenburg Castle =

13th-century Dutch castle

- Kasteel Doornenburg
- Doornenburg, Gelderland, the Netherlands
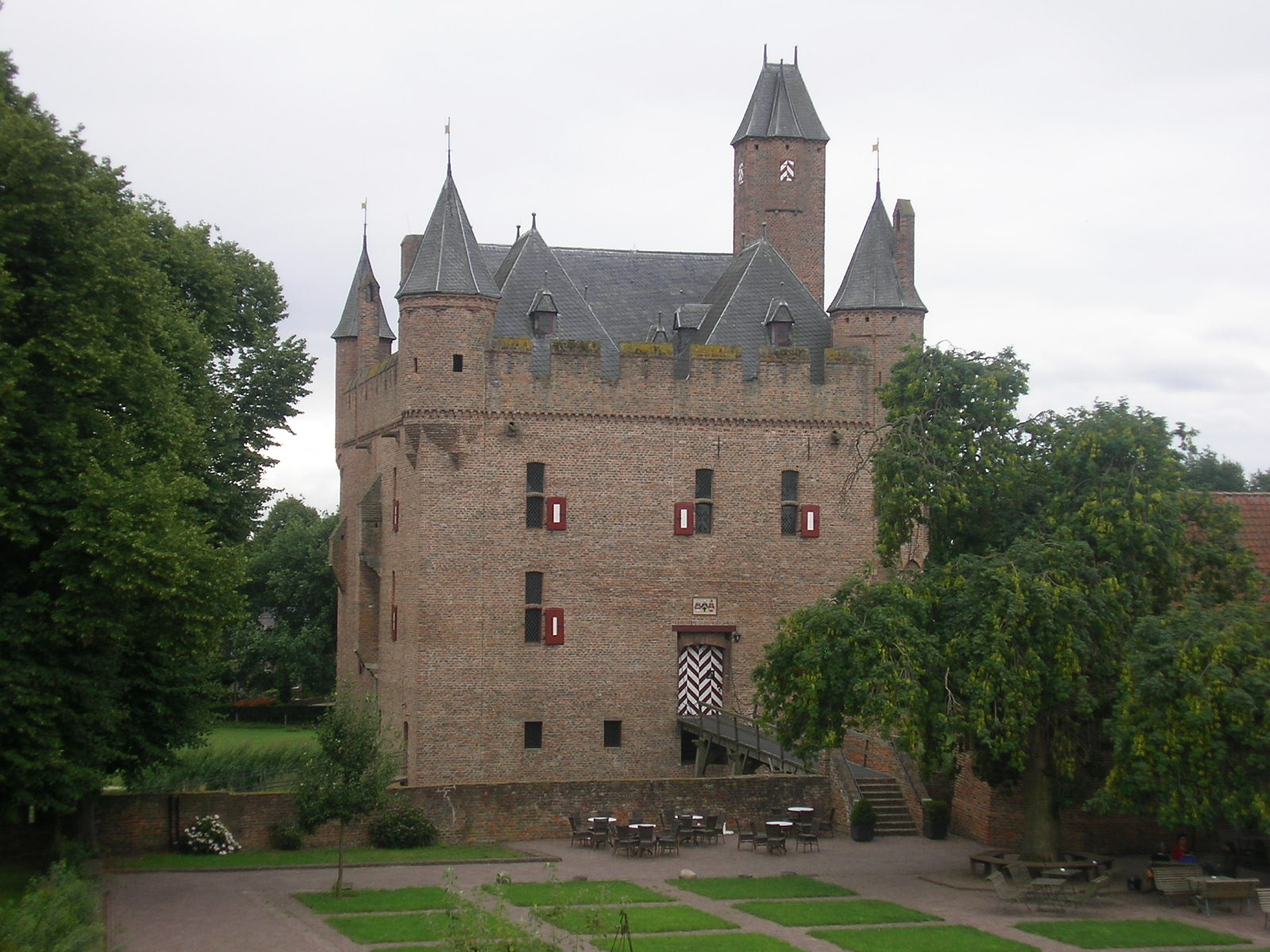
- Doornenburg Castle

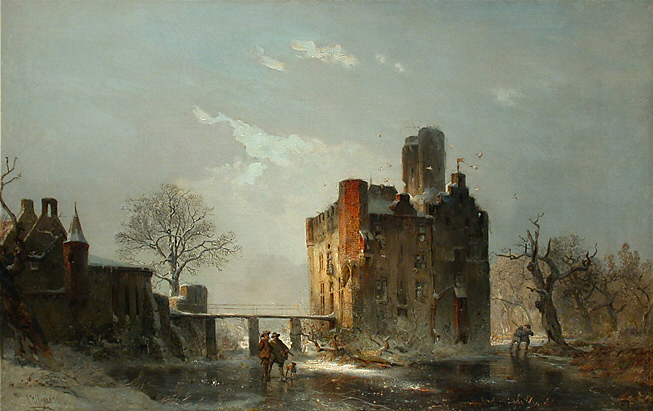
- Painting of the Castle by Carl Hilgers (1875)

Site information
- Type: Castle
- Open to the public: Yes
- Condition: Good

Location
- The Netherlands
- Coordinates: 51°53′37″N 5°59′56″E

Site history
- Built: 1200
- Materials: Brick
- Demolished: 1945; Rebuild: 1936-1954

The Doornenburg Castle (Dutch: Kasteel Doornenburg) is a Dutch castle from the 13th century.

The castle is located in the eastern part of the province of Gelderland, near the village of Doornenburg. It is one of the biggest and most well-preserved castles in the Netherlands. It consists of the main castle and a front castle which are connected via a small wooden bridge.

The castle was originally a fortified manor built in the 9th century. At this stage, it was known as the Villa Dorenburc. It wasn't until the 13th century that it was converted into a proper castle. Gradually, through the centuries, the castle was expanded further into its current form. The front castle was built in the 15th century. It contains sleeping quarters, a chapel and a farm, the latter being quite a unique feature for a Dutch castle.

Castle Doornenburg was occupied until the 18th century. After that it fell into disrepair and became a ruin. In 1936 the Stichting tot Behoud van den Doornenburg (literally: Foundation for Preservation of the Doornenburg) was created and the castle was restored between 1937 and 1941. Unfortunately, by the end of the Second World War it was almost completely destroyed. The Germans were thought to have blown it up, but it had actually been hit by a British bombardment in March 1945. The castle was completely rebuilt between 1947 and 1968.

In 1968, this castle, amongst others, was used as a set for the television series Floris.

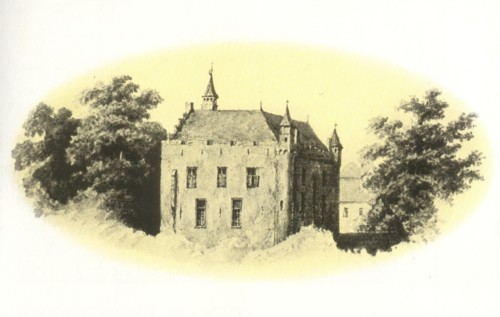
Old print

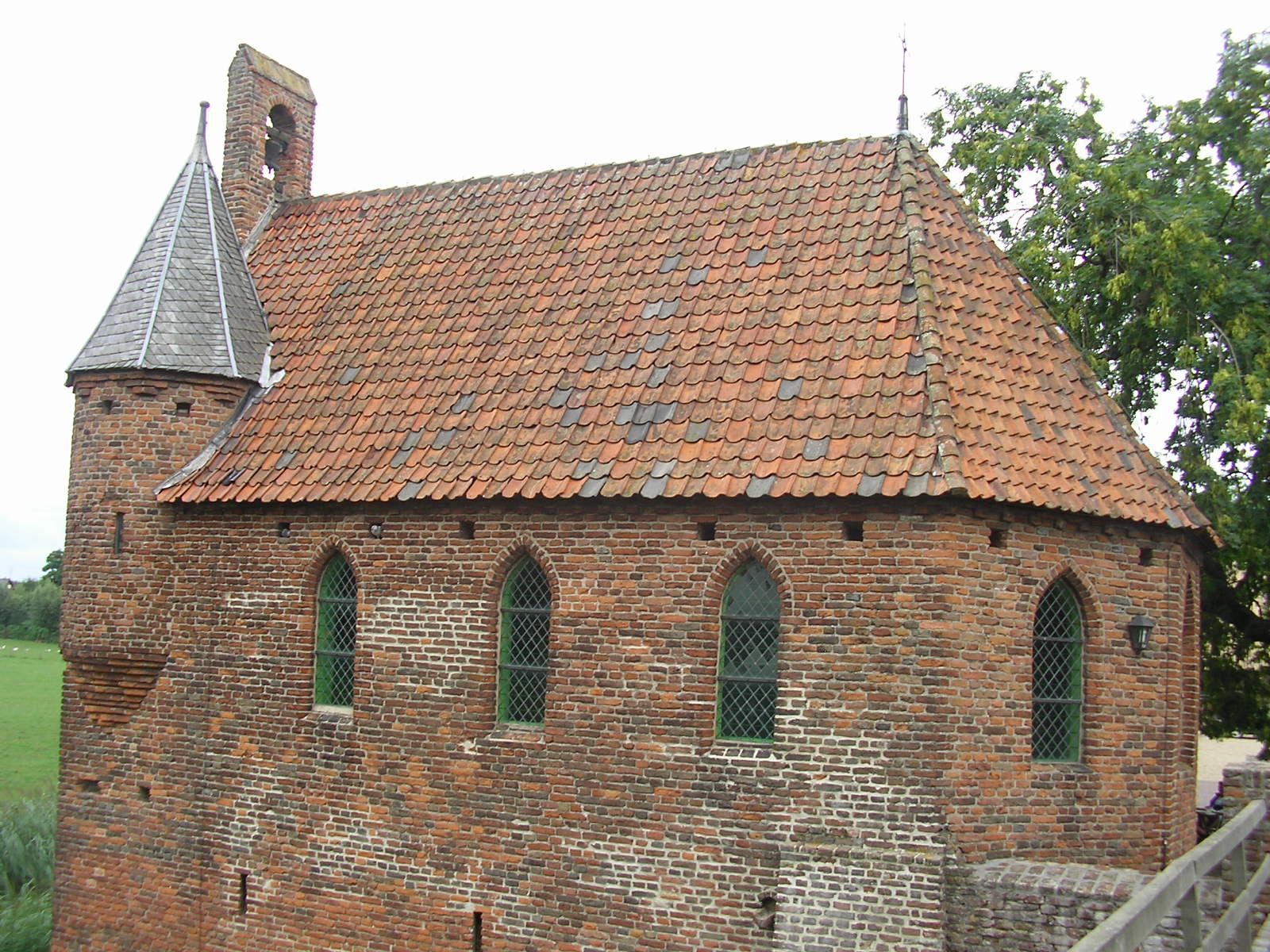
Chapel

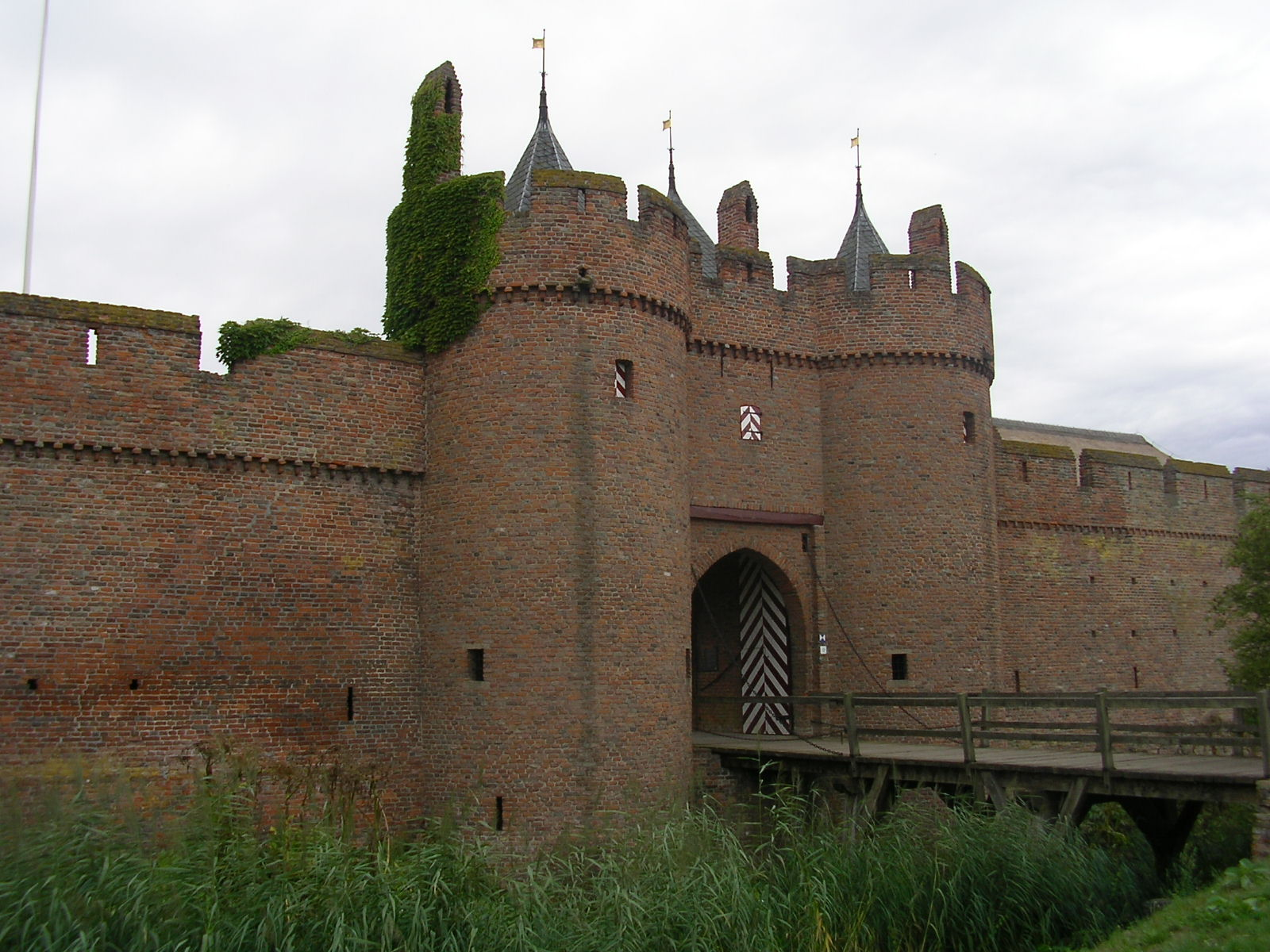
Main gate

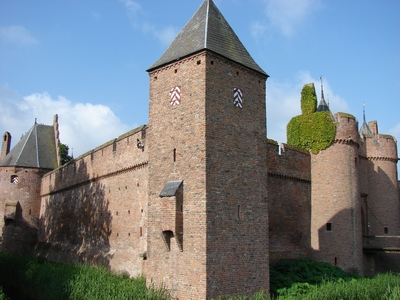
Castle wall

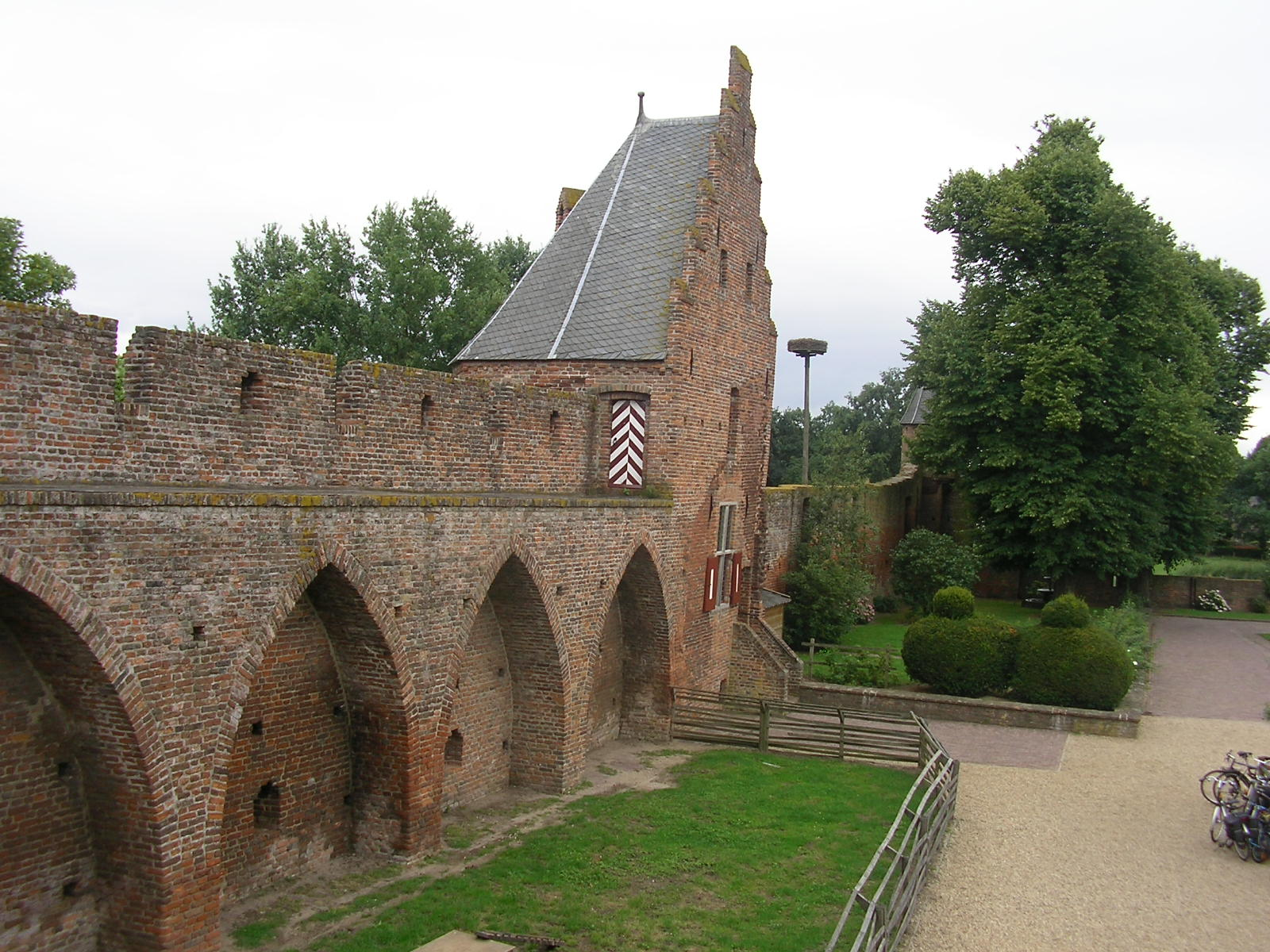
Castle wall

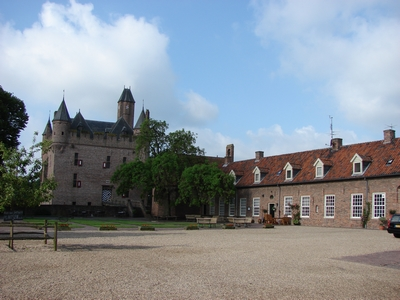
Castle courtyard

== See also ==
- Kinkelenburg Castle
- List of castles in the Netherlands
