= Floris (TV series) =

1969 Dutch action television series

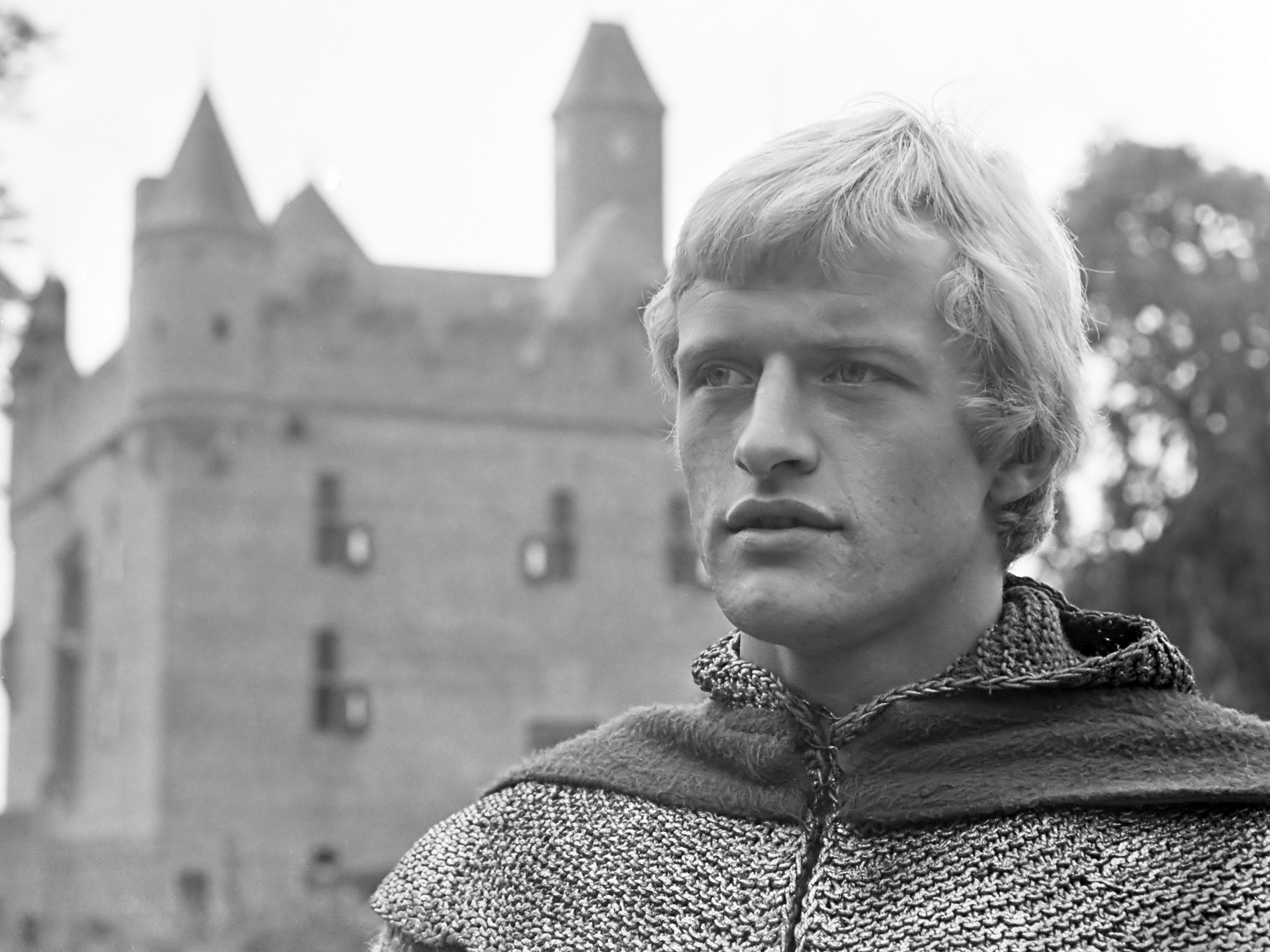
- Rutger Hauer as Floris (1969)
- Created by: Gerard Soeteman
- Directed by: Paul Verhoeven
- Starring: Rutger Hauer; Jos Bergman; Hans Boskamp
- Country of origin: Netherlands
- No. of episodes: 12

Production
- Running time: 27 minutes

Original release
- Network: NTS
- Release: October 15 – December 21, 1969

Floris is a 1969 Dutch action television series starring Rutger Hauer and Jos Bergman, written by Gerard Soeteman, and directed by Paul Verhoeven.

== Concept ==
The success of television series like the British Ivanhoe, the French Thierry La Fronde and the Flemish Johan en de Alverman inspired Carel Enkelaar, manager of NTS (forerunner of NTR) to make a similar series, set in the Netherlands. It was written by Gerard Soeteman. The series was filmed in black and white, and has been aired in reruns through the years. It has also been shown in East Germany and (dubbed in English) in Scotland.

== Historicity ==
Apart from Sindala and Floris, many of the characters are based on historical figures. A divergence from history is the presence of the pirate Greate Pier: although a contemporary, he was not active as a pirate before the death of Philip the Handsome. In the series, Pier is either guarded or surrounded by members of the Arumer Zwarte Hoop (called "Gelderse Friezen" in the series).

Although intended as a children's series, it was very popular with adults; for example, Floris's sword fight with two swords in the castle in the first episode looks surprisingly realistic. The series also had an educational element: customs, like timekeeping with bells, and the origin of words such as vernagelen ('to spike down'), are explained by example. While Floris is portrayed as a typical knight-hero – not too bright but a good swordsman – Sindala is the clever one, using Oriental scientific knowledge for practical applications (which also had educational value).

Locations included the medieval castles of Doornenburg, Loevestein and Hernen, all in the Dutch province of Gelderland (part of historical Guelders), and the Belgian cities Bruges and Ghent.

== Storyline ==
In the early 16th century, during the Guelders Wars (1502–1543), the knight Floris van Roozemond (spelling varies with o/oo, s/z and d/dt), accompanied by the Indian Sindala (Bergman), returns home from a trip around the world only to find his castle occupied by Maarten van Rossum, the commander in chief of Charles, Duke of Guelders. Charles, who controls Guelders, is involved in a power struggle against Philip the Handsome who rules the Burgundian Netherlands, the rest of the Low Countries. Floris had so far been neutral due to his absence, but after he finds his castle stolen, he sides with Wolter van Oldenstein, who is allied with Burgundy against Charles. Charles and Maarten are aided by the Frisian pirate Greate Pier partly as an ally, and partly to do the dirty work.

=== Episodes ===
Episode Number	Name	Original Release Date	Summary
1	Het gestolen kasteel (The Stolen Castle)	October 5, 1969	Floris van Rosemondt returns home after years of traveling to claim his inheritance: a castle. However, it is being used as a tollhouse by Maarten van Rossum. Maarten van Rossum has Floris and his companion Sindala imprisoned under the pretense of espionage for Wolter van Oldenstein. Wolter arrives to rescue them.
2	De koperen hond (The Copper Dog)	October 12, 1969	Oldenstein is under siege by Van Rossum, who brings in a massive cannon called the Copper Dog. Floris and Sindala, who are outside the castle, must find a way to sabotage it.
3	De zwarte kogels (The Black Bullets)	October 19, 1969	During an ambush on a weapons transport, it becomes clear that there is a traitor inside Oldenstein Castle. Sindala comes up with a plan to unmask the traitor.
4	De man van Gent (The Man from Ghent)	October 26, 1969	A man from Ghent named Gwijde van Suikerbuik arrives at Oldenstein with news that Van Rossum is planning to attack Oudewater. Lord Wolter sends reinforcements. Meanwhile, the bandit Lange Pier is supposedly heading to plunder the chapel, prompting Wolter and Floris to leave with their last soldiers. Sindala stays behind with Suikerbuik.
5	De harige duivel (The Hairy Devil)	November 2, 1969	When Philip the Handsome buys The Temptation of St. Anthony from the artist Hieronymus Bosch, Charles of Guelders sets his sights on the artwork. Lange Pier tries to steal the painting, despite being terrified of all the little devils depicted on it. In return for helping him make safe passage to Philip the Handsome, Bosch creates a new painting for Floris and Sindala, The Pedlar.
6	De vrijbrief (The Pass Papers)	November 9, 1969	Floris and Sindala are allowed into the city of Guelders with a safe conduct pass for the day to carry out the business of buying a suit of armor. Sindala starts to sense something is off.
7	De drie narren (The Three Fools)	November 16, 1969	Floris and Sindala must deliver an urgent letter to Utrecht, but it first needs to be sealed by commander Reinbout. Upon arriving at his castle, they find it ransacked by Van Rossum. Everyone has been taken, except for the court jester. Together with the jester, they devise a plan to rescue Reinbout. But the Guelders captain Barend van Hackfort is also lurking nearby.
8	De alruin (The Mandrake)	November 23, 1969	A grand feast is held for Lord Wolter Oldenstein’s birthday. When Van Hackfort manages to sneak into the kitchens and poisons the soup, the entire castle is drugged—except for Floris and Sindala, who must quickly find an antidote.
9	Het brandende water (The Burning Water)	November 30, 1969	After the death of her uncle, Countess Ada of Couwenberg comes into possession of an important will. Charles of Guelders wants it too, so Lange Pier captures the countess. Luckily, Floris and Sindala are nearby.
10	De wonderdoener (The Miracle Man)	December 7, 1969	Veltman wins over the whole town with his so-called miracle potions. Van Rossum pressures him to incite the people against Oldenstein. Veltman, who has a score to settle with Sindala, gladly agrees.
11	De Byzantijnse beker: Het toernooi (The Byzantine Goblet: The Tournament)	December 14, 1969	In a Guelders castle, Lady Isabella lies dying. Her suitors, Govert and Roland, try to cure her to win her hand. They hear about a tournament at Oldenstein where a miraculous cup can be won. Both men try to get their hands on it—though Govert plays dirty.
12	De Byzantijnse beker: De genezing (The Byzantine Goblet: The Healing)	December 21, 1969	When Roland wins the tournament, Govert ambushes him and steals the cup. Floris and Sindala find the wounded Roland and decide to help. But their attempt to rescue Isabella from Govert’s clutches fails.
13	Het Gericht (the tribunal)	August 19, 2016	In 2016, raw footage was found from this unfinished episode. The tribunal was assembled, and ran just over 18 minutes when linked with panels from the newspaper comic strip and narration where necessary to make up for the missing material. It was then shown at Doornenburg Castle, one of the original filming locations. All the material of both unfinished episodes was later made available online through a regional Guelders broadcaster.
14	De Bouwmeester (The Architect)	2016	Only a few minutes of the episode was found in 2016.

== Cast ==
- Rutger Hauer ... Floris
- Jos Bergman ... Sindala
- Ton Vos ... Wolter van Oldenstein
- Jacco van Renesse ... Rogier
- Hans Culeman ... Maarten van Rossem
- Tim Beekman ... Sergeant
- Pollo Hamburger ... Diederik
- Henk Admiraal ... Wilhelm
- Diana Dobbelman ... Ada
- Ida Bons ... Viola
- Hans Boskamp ... Lange Pier
- Sacco van der Made ... Aernout
- Nico Deegen ... Ubbe
- Peter Aryans ... Boer
- Frans Kokshoorn ... Molenaar
- Ad Hoeymans ... Barend van Hackfort
- Niek Engelschman ... Zweden
- Carola Gijsbers van Wijk ... Isabella
- Hans Kemna ... Govert
- Lex Schoorel ... Roland
- Eric Schuttelaar ... Wobbe
- Tony Verwey ... Waard
- Paul van Gorcum ... Priester
- Jan Apon ... Personal Physician of the Duke of Guelders

== Production ==
Finding actors for the series was not easy because television was still regarded as inferior to the theatre. Hauer was introduced to Verhoeven as "maybe not such a good actor, but he will do and dare anything". Verhoeven was indeed worried about Hauer's lack of acting experience, but he looked good physically, could handle swords and ride horses well and did most of his stunts himself. The original name of the series was Floris and the Fakir. Hauer learned the TV acting fast enough.

For the time it was a major production with 80 actors and 2500 extras. Verhoeven overspent the budget of 355,000 guilders by more than 300% (the total production costs cannot be calculated exactly anymore, but are estimated to be ƒ1,200,000 or €545,000). When this became clear, it was already too late to stop the production because Verhoeven used "vertical planning", in which the filming was done per actor instead of per episode. Stopping the production would mean that all work was lost. As a TV production of this scale had never been done before in the Netherlands, there was a lot of pioneering. Recordings were usually made in the studio, but Floris was mostly shot outside. Everyone on the set, including Verhoeven, had to learn the trade as they went. Tasks were also not strictly delineated, like they are these days; everyone was a bit of a jack of all trades. "We didn't stand with our arms folded smoking a cigarette when it wasn't our turn." Ironically, finding good locations for this TV production was difficult because the popularity of television had resulted in potential shooting locations spoiled by the television antennas that had by then become ubiquitous.

=== Collaboration ===
The series was the first major undertaking of both Hauer and Verhoeven, as well as their first collaboration. It was followed by Turkish Delight (Turks Fruit) and Soldier of Orange (Soldaat van Oranje); ideas not used for the series were later included in the film Flesh and Blood, also directed by Verhoeven with Hauer in the lead role (which also proved to be their final collaboration).

== Related video media ==
=== United Kingdom ===
The series was sold for redubbing to channels in the UK. In the UK, the series aired on Yorkshire Television in 1970 as The Adventures of Floris. None of the English dubbed episodes survive.

=== Germany ===
In 1975, there was a West German remake of the series, Floris von Rosemund, again starring Rutger Hauer, but with German actor Derval de Faria as Sindala. This version, directed by Austrian director Ferry Radax, put much more emphasis on the comedic aspects of the stories and provided the female characters Ada and Viola with larger parts than the original.

In 1977, the East German dub of the original Dutch series was made.

=== DVD ===
The original series has been released on DVD, as has the German remake; neither edition has any other languages or subtitles. However, fan made English subtitles exist for the Dutch series.

=== Film adaptation ===
The movie Floris (2004) was shot in 2003. It was directed by Jean van de Velde and features Michiel Huisman as the grandson of the original Floris. The new side-kick is Pi, a role played by pop star Birgit Schuurman. Some of the footage from the 1969 series with Hauer and Bergman is included. Hauer was originally asked to play the father of young Floris, but he declined.

== Audio plays ==
Two of the unproduced scripts were produced as audio plays; they seem to be the same adventures as #6 and #8 of the newspaper comic adventures and #7 and #10 of the German remake.

== Text stories ==
Photo-illustrated text stories of two episodes were serialised in the short-lived comic magazine Jamin Junior during 1972. These were "De Wonderdoener" (Nummers 1–14) and "De Zwarte Kogels" (Nummers 15–26). As publication of Jamin Junior was terminated rather suddenly, it is believed the second adaptation remained unfinished.

== Newspaper comics ==
Starting in 1972, 15 scripts for the Floris series (not taken into production) were made into newspaper comics published in De Telegraaf by Gerrit Stapel. The art and dialogue were Stapel's, but the story Soeteman's, so the newspaper comics should be considered a canonical source of information about Floris's further adventures. Most important event in the comics is that Floris regains ownership of castle Rozenmondt in the 7th comics adventure.
