= Rutger Hauer =

Dutch actor (1944–2019)

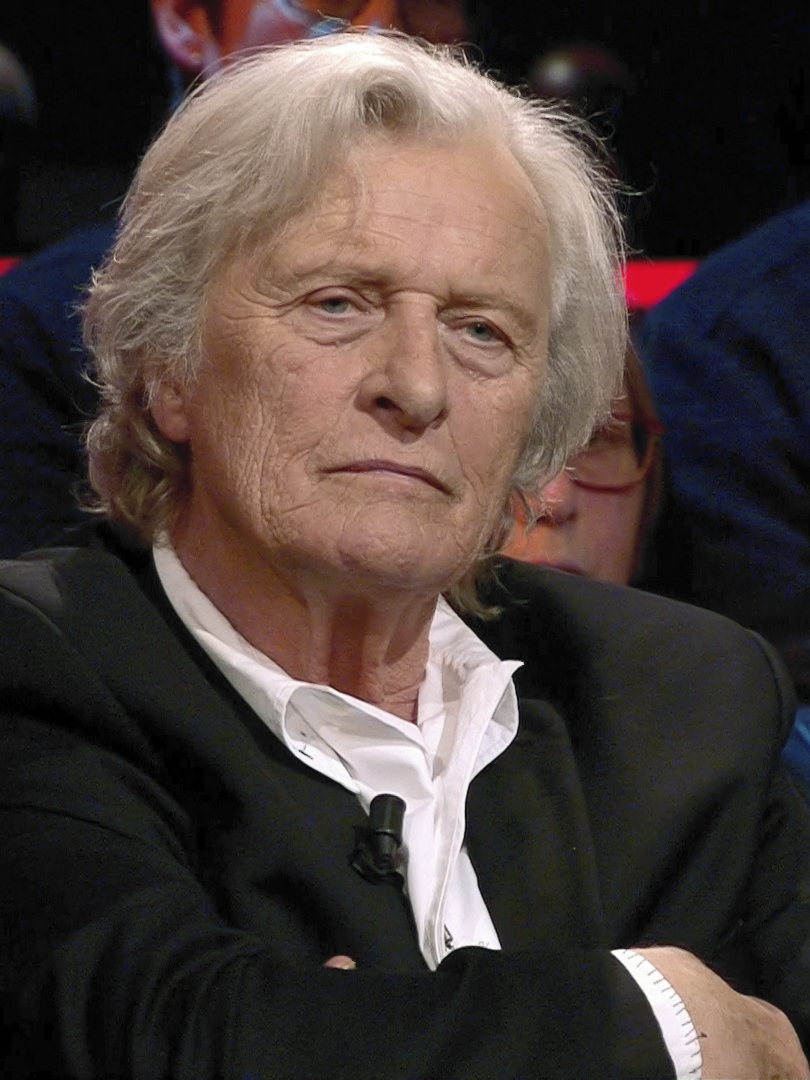
- Hauer in 2018
- Born: Rutger Oelsen Hauer; 23 January 1944; Breukelen, Utrecht, Netherlands
- Died: 19 July 2019 (aged 75); Beetsterzwaag, Friesland, Netherlands
- Occupation: Actor
- Years active: 1969–2019
- Spouses: Heidi Merz (divorced); Ineke ten Cate (m. 1985)
- Children: 1
- Parent: Arend Hauer (father)

Rutger Oelsen Hauer (Dutch: [ˈrʏtxər ˈulsə(n) ˈɦʌuər]; 23 January 1944 – 19 July 2019) was a Dutch actor, with a career that spanned over 170 roles across nearly 50 years, beginning in 1969. In 1999, he was named by the Dutch public as the Best Dutch Actor of the Century.

Hauer's career began in 1969 with the title role in the Dutch television series Floris and surged with his leading role in Turkish Delight (1973), which in 1999 was named the Best Dutch Film of the Century. After gaining international recognition with Soldier of Orange (1977) and Spetters (1980), he moved into American films such as Nighthawks (1981) and Blade Runner (1982), starring in the latter as self-aware replicant Roy Batty. His performance in Blade Runner led to roles in The Osterman Weekend (1983), Ladyhawke (1985), The Hitcher (1986), Escape from Sobibor (1987), The Legend of the Holy Drinker (1988), and Blind Fury (1989), among other films.

From the 1990s on, Hauer moved into low-budget films, and supporting roles in major films like Buffy the Vampire Slayer (1992), Confessions of a Dangerous Mind (2002), Batman Begins (2005), Sin City (2005), and The Rite (2011). Hauer also became well known for his work in commercials. Towards the end of his career, he made a return to Dutch cinema, and won the 2012 Rembrandt Award for Best Actor in recognition of his lead role in The Heineken Kidnapping (2011).

Hauer supported environmentalist causes and was a member of the Sea Shepherd Conservation Society. He also founded the Rutger Hauer Starfish Association, an AIDS awareness organization. He was made a knight of the Order of the Netherlands Lion in 2013.

== Early life ==
Hauer was born in Breukelen, in the Province of Utrecht, on 23 January 1944, while the Netherlands was under German occupation during World War II. He stated in a 1981 interview, "I was born in the middle of the war, and I think for that reason I have deep roots in pacifism. Violence frightens me." His parents were Teunke (née Mellema) and Arend Hauer, both actors who operated an acting school in nearby Amsterdam. He had three sisters. According to Hauer, his parents were more interested in their art than their children. He did not have a close relationship with his father, and writer Erik Hazelhoff Roelfzema later became a father figure to Hauer after they met during the filming of Soldier of Orange.

Hauer attended a Rudolf Steiner school, as his parents wanted him to develop his creativity. At the age of 15, he left school to join the Dutch merchant navy. He spent a year travelling the world aboard a freighter, but was unable to become a captain due to his colourblindness. Returning home, he worked in odd jobs while finishing his high school diploma at night. He then entered the Academy for Theater and Dance in Amsterdam for acting classes, but soon dropped out to join the Royal Netherlands Army. He received training as a combat medic, but left the service after a few months as he opposed the use of deadly weapons. He subsequently returned to acting school and graduated in 1967.

== Career ==
=== Early works ===
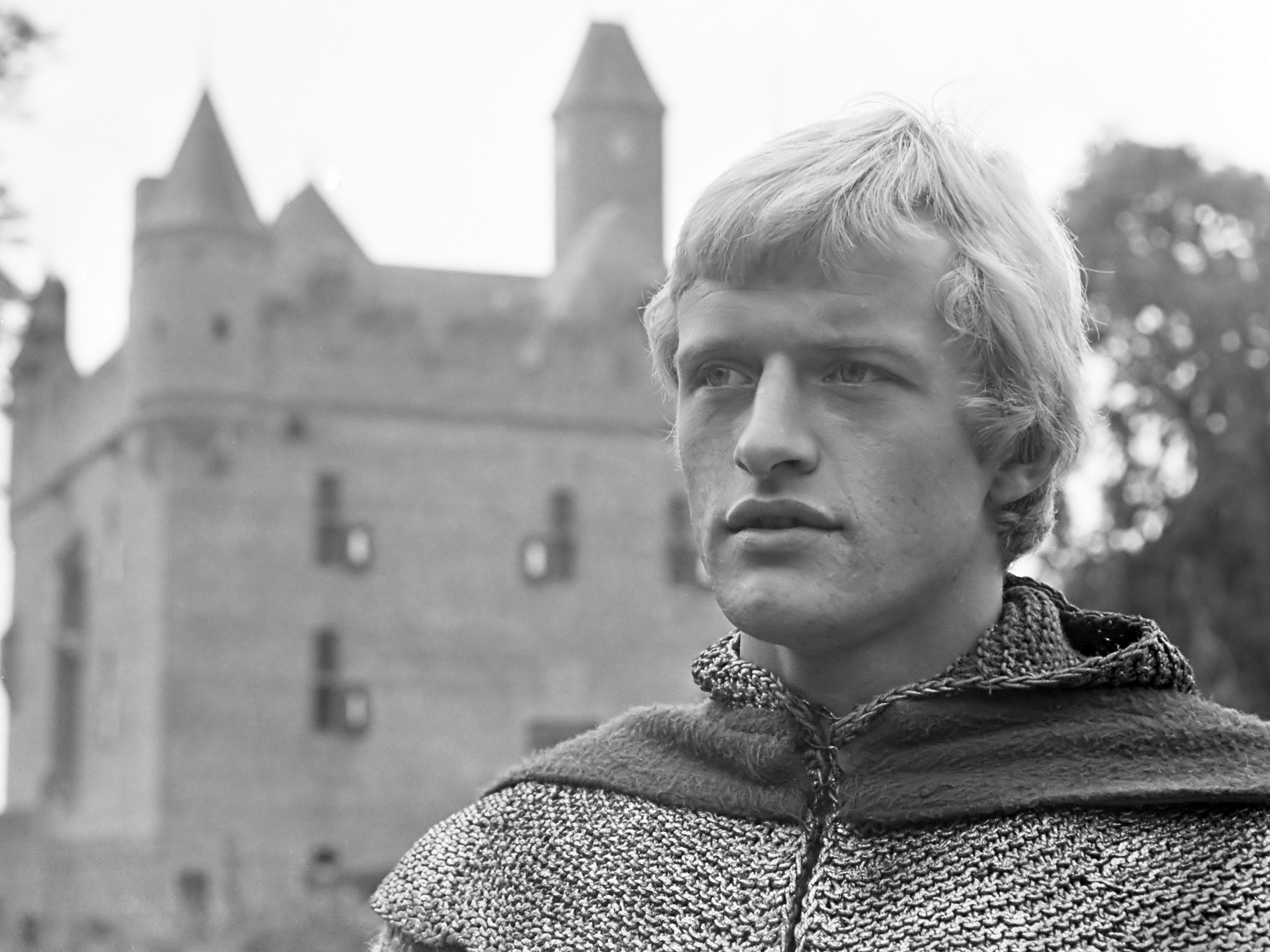
Hauer filming for Floris in 1968

Hauer had his first acting role at the age of 11, as Eurysakes in the play Ajax. After graduating from the Academy for Theater and Dance, he became a stage actor with the Toneelgroep Noorder Compagnie. Hauer made his screen debut in 1969 when Paul Verhoeven cast him in the lead role of the television series Floris, a Dutch medieval action drama. The role made him famous in his native country, and Hauer reprised his role for the 1975 German remake Floris von Rosemund.

Hauer's career changed course when Verhoeven cast him in Turkish Delight (1973), which received an Oscar nomination for best foreign-language film. The film found box office favour abroad and at home, and Hauer looked to appear in more international films. Within two years, Hauer made his English-language debut in the British film The Wilby Conspiracy (1975). Set in South Africa, the film was an action-drama with a focus on apartheid. Hauer's supporting role, however, was barely noticed in Hollywood, and he returned to Dutch films for several years. During this period, he made Katie Tippel (1975) and worked again with Verhoeven on Soldier of Orange (1977), and Spetters (1980). These two films paired Hauer with fellow Dutch actor Jeroen Krabbé. At the 1981 Netherlands Film Festival, Hauer received the Golden Calf for Best Actor for his overall body of work.

=== American breakthrough ===
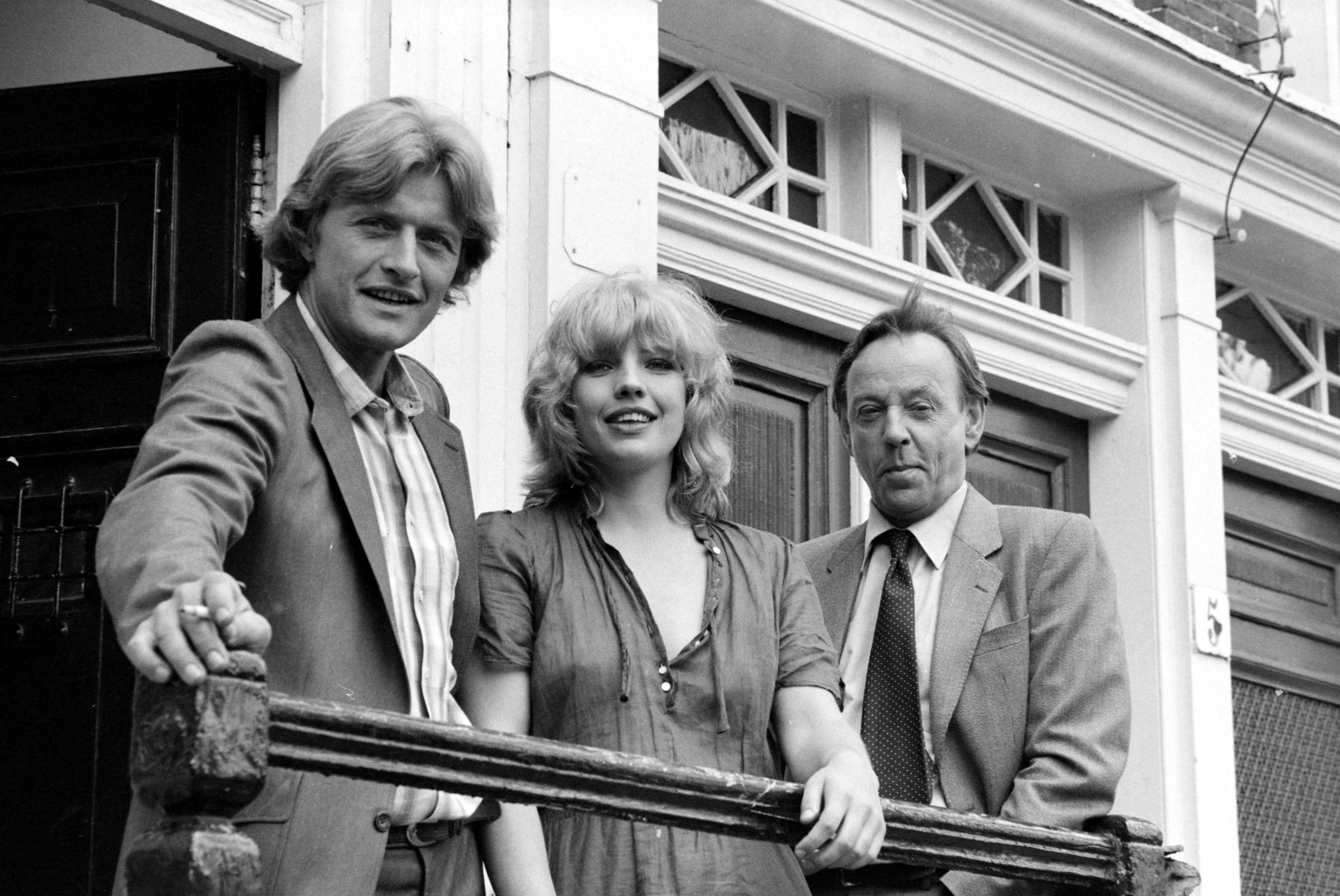
Hauer (left) in 1979

Hauer made his American debut in the Sylvester Stallone film Nighthawks (1981) as a psychopathic, cold-blooded terrorist named Wulfgar. With his sights set on a long-term career in Hollywood, Hauer worked with an accent coach in the early 1980s to develop a convincing American accent. Unafraid of controversial roles, he portrayed the German architect and Nazi minister Albert Speer in the 1982 American Broadcasting Company production Inside the Third Reich. The same year, Hauer appeared in arguably his most famous and acclaimed role as the eccentric and violent but sympathetic antihero Roy Batty in Ridley Scott's 1982 science fiction thriller Blade Runner, in which he delivered the famous tears in rain monologue. Hauer composed parts of the monologue the evening prior to filming, "cutting away swathes of the original script before adding the speech's poignant final line". He went on to play the adventurer courting Theresa Russell in Eureka (1983), an investigative reporter opposite John Hurt in The Osterman Weekend (1983), the hardened mercenary Martin in Flesh & Blood (1985), and a knight paired with Michelle Pfeiffer in Ladyhawke (1985).

He appeared in The Hitcher (1986) as the titular mysterious hitchhiker tormenting a lone motorist, murdering anyone in his way. He received the 1987 Golden Globe Award for Best Supporting Actor for his role in the television film Escape from Sobibor. At the height of Hauer's fame, he was set to be cast as RoboCop (1987), but Verhoeven, the film's director, considered his frame as too large to move comfortably in the character's suit. Also in 1987, Hauer starred as Nick Randall in Wanted: Dead or Alive as the descendant of the character played by Steve McQueen in the television series of the same name.

In 1988, he played a homeless man in Ermanno Olmi's The Legend of the Holy Drinker. This performance won Hauer the Best Actor award at the 1989 Seattle International Film Festival. Hauer was chosen to portray a blind martial artist superhero in Phillip Noyce's action film Blind Fury (1989). He initially struggled with the implausibility of the character, but learned to "unfocus my eyes, to react to smells and sounds" after meeting with blind judo practitioner Lynn Manning during his research for the role. Hauer returned to science fiction in 1989 with The Blood of Heroes, in which he played a gladiator in a post-apocalyptic world.

=== Commercials and later roles ===
By the 1990s, Hauer was well known for his humorous Guinness commercials as well as his screen roles, which had increasingly involved low-budget films, such as Split Second (1992); The Beans of Egypt, Maine (1994); Omega Doom (1996) and New World Disorder (1999). In 1992, he appeared in the horror-comedy film Buffy the Vampire Slayer as the main antagonist vampire Lothos. He also appeared in the Kylie Minogue music video "On a Night Like This" (2000). During this time, Hauer acted in several British, Canadian and American television productions, including Amelia Earhart: The Final Flight (1994) as Earhart's navigator Fred Noonan, Fatherland (1994), Hostile Waters (1997), The Call of the Wild: Dog of the Yukon (1997), Merlin (1998), The 10th Kingdom (2000), Smallville (2003), Alias (2003), and Salem's Lot (2004).

Hauer played an assassin in Confessions of a Dangerous Mind (2003), a villainous cardinal with influential power in Sin City (2005) and a devious corporate executive running Wayne Enterprises in Batman Begins (2005). Also in 2005, he played the title role in Patrick Lussier's film Dracula III: Legacy. Seven years later, he portrayed the vampire hunter Abraham Van Helsing in Dario Argento's Dracula 3D. Hauer hosted the British reality television documentary Shock Treatment in 2005, and featured in Goal II: Living the Dream (2007) as Real Madrid coach Rudi Van der Merwe. He also recorded voice-overs for the British advertising campaign for the Danish butter brand Lurpak.

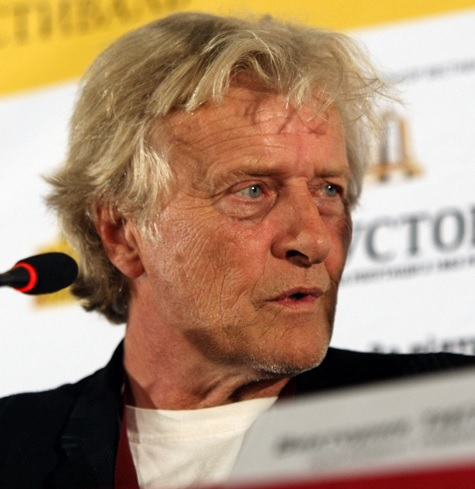
Hauer at the Odesa International Film Festival, 2010

In 2008, Hauer received the Golden Calf Culture Prize for his contributions to Dutch cinema. The award recognised his work as an actor as well as his efforts to aid the development of young filmmakers and actors, through initiatives such as the Rutger Hauer Film Factory. In 2009, his role in avant-garde filmmaker Cyrus Frisch's Dazzle received positive reviews; it was described in Dutch press as "the most relevant Dutch film of the year". The same year, Hauer starred in the title role of Barbarossa, an Italian film directed by Renzo Martinelli. In April 2010, he was cast in the live action adaptation of the short and fictitious Grindhouse trailer Hobo with a Shotgun (2011). Hauer played Freddie Heineken in The Heineken Kidnapping (2011), for which he received the 2012 Rembrandt Award for Best Actor. Also in 2011, Hauer appeared in the supernatural horror film The Rite as an undertaker named Istvan, the protagonist's father.

From 2013 to 2014, Hauer featured as Niall Brigant in HBO's True Blood. In 2015, he starred as Ravn in The Last Kingdom and as Kingsley in Galavant. In 2016, he joined the film jury for ShortCutz Amsterdam, an annual film festival promoting short films in Amsterdam. Hauer voiced the role of Daniel Lazarski in the 2017 video game Observer, set in post-apocalyptic Poland. Lazarski is a member of a special elite police unit that can hack into minds and interact with memories within. Hauer also provided the voice of Xehanort in the 2019 video game Kingdom Hearts III, replacing the late Leonard Nimoy. (When Hauer himself died, he was replaced by Christopher Lloyd). Also in 2019, Hauer was originally cast as the Ghost of Christmas Future in the 2019 British television dark fantasy drama A Christmas Carol; when he became too ill to film his scenes, he was replaced by Jason Flemyng.

== Personal life ==
Hauer was married twice. Hauer and his first wife, Heidi Merz, had one child. Hauer was in a relationship with his second wife, Ineke ten Cate, from 1968. They married in a private ceremony on 22 November 1985.

Although born in Utrecht, Hauer had strong links to Friesland. He once stated in an interview with the Algemeen Dagblad that he "needed to feel the Frisian clay under [his] feet". Hauer was an environmentalist. He supported the Sea Shepherd Conservation Society and was a member of its board of advisors. He also established an AIDS awareness organization called the Rutger Hauer Starfish Association. In April 2007, he published his autobiography, All Those Moments: Stories of Heroes, Villains, Replicants, and Blade Runners (co-written with Patrick Quinlan), in which he discussed many of his acting roles.

Hauer died from pancreatic cancer on 19 July 2019 at his residence in the Netherlands, age 75.

== Discography ==
- Lost in the New Real by Arjen Anthony Lucassen (2012) – Narrator/Voight Kampff, lyrics
- Babies by Rutger Hauer's Starfish
