= Hans Teeuwen =

Dutch comedian and actor

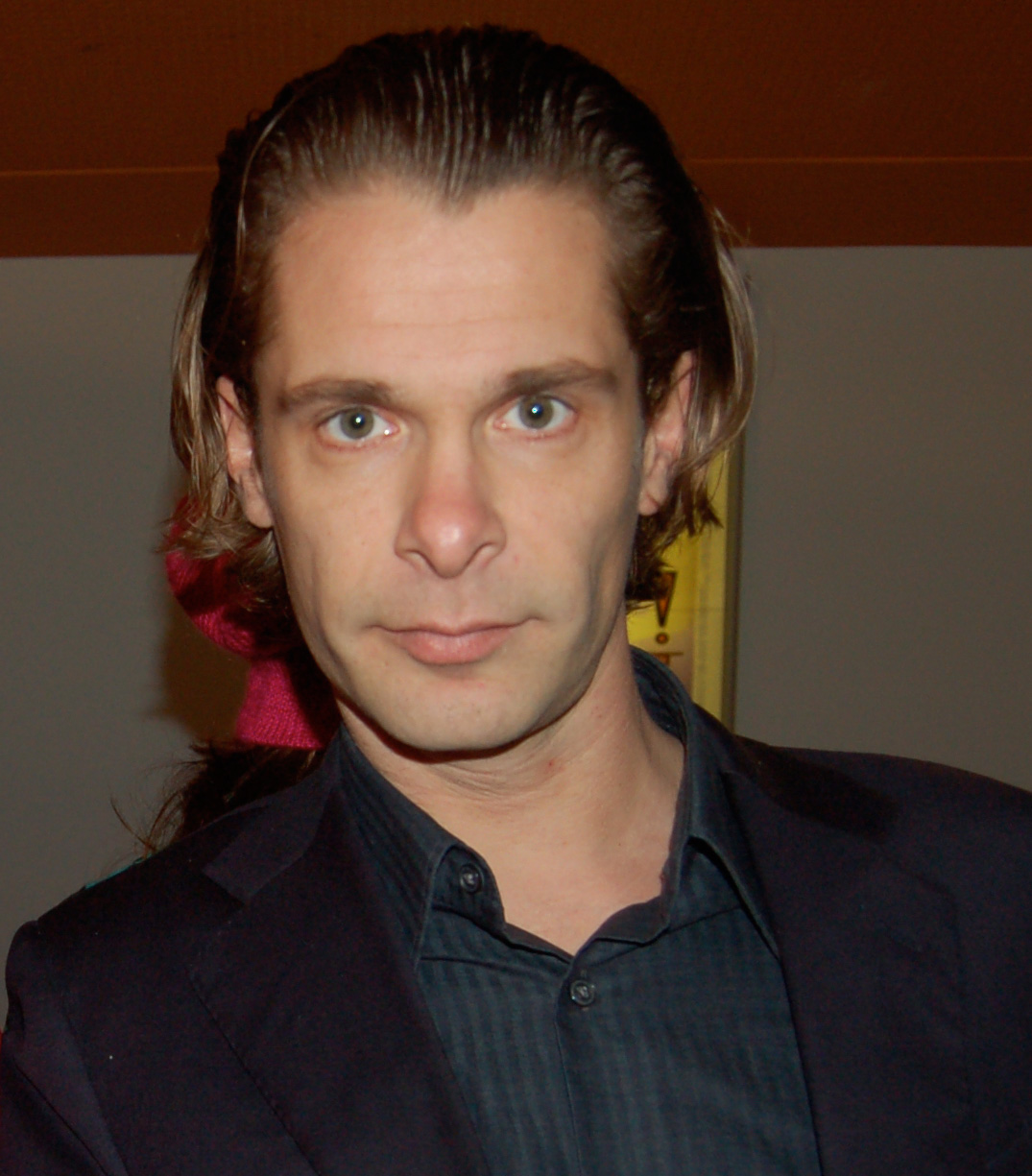
- Hans Teeuwen during the Borat premiere in Amsterdam
- Born: Hans Eduard Marie Teeuwen; 3 March 1967 (age 59); Budel, Netherlands
- Children: Nika Teeuwen

Comedy career
- Years active: 1991–present
- Medium: Theatre; Television; Film; Radio
- Genres: Improvisational; Character; Absurdist; Shock/Black comedy; Stand-up

Hans Eduard Marie Teeuwen (born 3 March 1967) is a Dutch comedian, musician, actor and occasional filmmaker. His work has been described as absurdist, apolitical and confrontational.

== Dutch career ==
=== Theatre ===
In the Netherlands, Teeuwen became well known in 1991 when he won an award at the Dutch cabaret festival Cameretten for his show Heist, together with his friend Roland Smeenk. Just before the ending of the try-outs of this show, Smeenk died in a car accident in 1992.

Teeuwen decided to go solo as a 'cabaretier'. (Dutch cabaret is a sort of stand-up comedy often lasting for an hour or two, which has a storyline or theme, and can include songs, music and poetry as opposed to purely stand-up comedy.) Initially he did five shows, Hard en Zielig (Hard and Sad, 1994–1995), Met een Breierdeck (With a Knitter's Deck, 1995–1997), Trui (Sweater, 1999–2000), Dat Dan Weer Wel (2001–2002, So There's That) and Industry of Love (2003–2004). Then after seven years he made a comeback in 2011 with his show Spiksplinter (Brand Spanking), followed some years later by Echte Rancune (Real Rancour) in 2016. One of the other comedy projects he has worked on is Poelmo, Slaaf van het Zuiden (Poelmo, Slave of the South), a series of shorter comedy shows with his friends and colleagues Pieter Bouwman and Gummbah. Bouwman and Teeuwen also worked together on a radio comedy show that was mainly improvised, called Mannen van de Radio (The Men on the Radio).

=== TV & film ===
Apart from a few comic parts with popular Dutch absurdistic comedy group Jiskefet, he acted in the 1999 film Jezus is een Palestijn (Jesus Is a Palestinian). Together with Theodor Holman he co-created the idea for the film Interview, directed by Theo van Gogh in 2003 (and remade in 2007 in the USA by Steve Buscemi). He wrote and directed the film Masterclass in 2005. A couple of years later, he starred in the film Gewoon Hans (Just Hans), written and directed by friend and colleague Diederik Ebbinge from comedy group De Vliegende Panters ("The Flying Panthers"); this film premiered on Dutch television on 30 December 2009, and was released on DVD in January 2010.

=== Singing career ===
From 2006 onwards, Teeuwen performed as a crooner in an Amsterdam nightclub, ultimately resulting in a DVD titled Hans Teeuwen Zingt (literal English: Hans Teeuwen Sings), on which he sings songs by artists such as Billie Holiday and Frank Sinatra, together with his band. In 2008, Teeuwen performed at the North Sea Jazz Festival. He released a CD consisting of self-written songs, titled How It Aches, in March 2010. A CD in Dutch language titled Popstukken appeared in 2015.

== International career ==
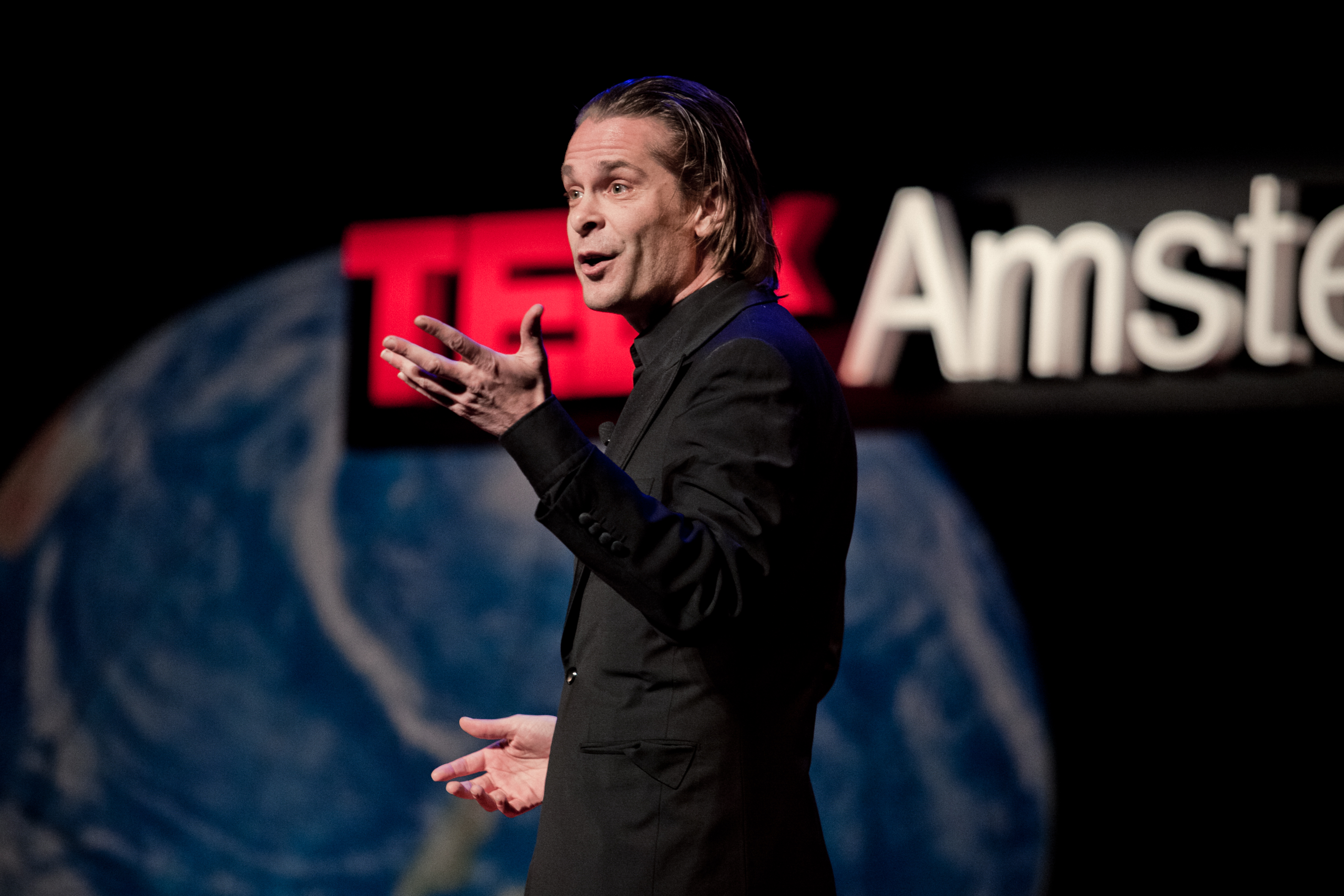
Hans Teeuwen at TEDxAmsterdam in November 2010

In 2005, Teeuwen announced he would no longer perform, incidentally coinciding with the politically motivated assassination of director and close friend Theo van Gogh. However, in 2007 he decided to try a new challenge: performing in English. He appeared at the 2007 Edinburgh Festival Fringe as part of the Amsterdam Underground Comedy Collective, which spurred him to do a longer show. In 2008 he performed solo at the Soho Theatre in London. He also returned to the Edinburgh Festival Fringe in 2008, and performed at Suffolk's 2008 Latitude Festival. In October 2008, he performed a show in the Leicester Square Theatre, London that was recorded for a future DVD release. In 2009, he performed at the Leicester Comedy Festival and the Belfast Festival at Queen's.

== Political views ==
Although his work is typically devoid of politics, in real life Teeuwen has repeatedly acted as a fervent supporter of freedom of speech, especially after the murder of his friend Theo van Gogh. His eulogy and speech at the unveiling of a statue in memory of Van Gogh was an example of his views. A video clip of Teeuwen advocating freedom of speech while being interviewed by three female Muslim TV presenters was chosen as "Dutch TV Moment of 2007".

== Personal life ==
Hans Teeuwen is married to photographer Eva Boeter. In September 2013 their child Nika was born.
