= Najib en Julia =

Najib en Julia is a 2003 Dutch television serial in six episodes directed by Theo van Gogh. It won the Golden Calf for Best TV-Drama at the Nederlands Film Festival.

== Cast ==
- Eva van der Gucht as Ellen
- Lisa van Nievelt as Nicolien
- Ingrid Willemse as Zuster
- Hanin Msellek as Najib
- Tara Elders as Julia
- Najib Amhali as Nasr
- Sabri Saad El-Hamus as Kamal
- Achmed Elghazaoui as Achmed
- Thijs Römer as Floris
- Wimie Wilhelm as Lerares
- Cahit Ölmez as Khalid
