= The Interview (2021 film) =

- Original tentative poster of the film
- Directed by: Laurence Postma
- Written by: Laurence Postma; Farrukh Dhondy
- Produced by: Sunitha Ram; Laurence Postma; Ram Samtani; Pappee Sangtani
- Starring: Anjum Nayar; Jackie Shroff
- Cinematography: Uday Tiwari
- Edited by: Yule Rohan Kurup
- Music by: Monty Sharma; Shamir Tandon
- Production companies: Fourth Wall Entertainment; Glorious Entertainment
- Release date: August 2021
- Country: India
- Language: Hindi

The Interview: Night of 26/11 (formerly titled Cover Story) is a 2021 Indian Hindi-language thriller film directed by Laurence Postma and co-written by Farrukh Dhondy and starring Anjum Nayar and Jackie Shroff. It is the second official remake of the acclaimed Dutch film Interview, directed by Theo Van Gogh in 2003, the first being Interview by Steve Buscemi in 2007. Originally planned to release in 2011, it was delayed for unspecified reasons and finally released in August 2021.

== Plot ==
A successful film actress (Anjum Nayar) and a special assignment for a magazine Cover Story, a one night account (on the night of 26/11) of an interview by a journalist (Jackie Shroff), a former war correspondent, with the film star and the scoop that the correspondent gets for the publication.

== Cast ==
- Anjum Nayar
- Jackie Shroff
- Yuri Suri
