= Katja Schuurman =

Dutch actress, singer and television personality

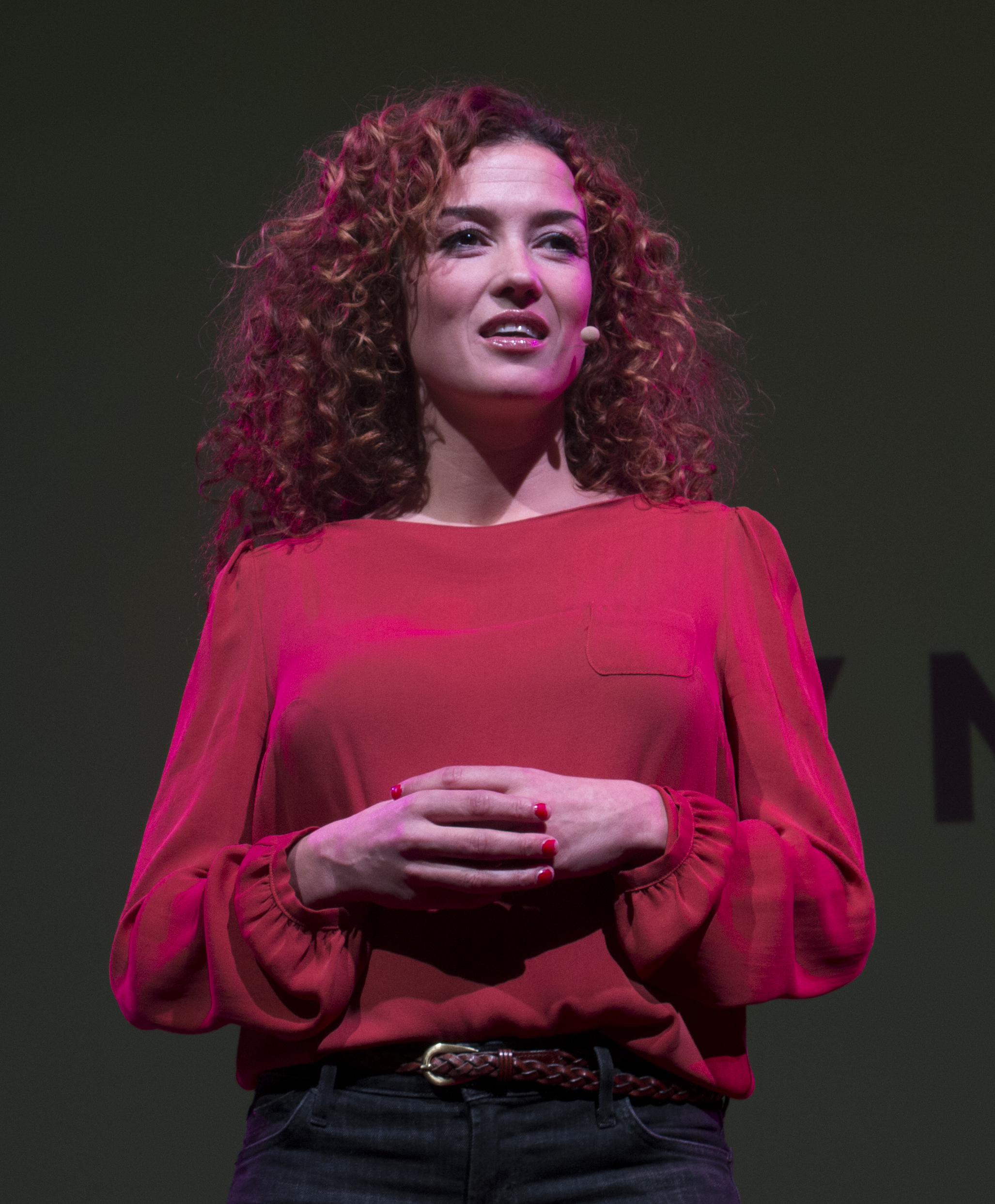
- Schuurman in 2012
- Born: 19 February 1975 (age 51); Bunnik, Netherlands
- Other name: Katja Römer Schuurman
- Occupations: Actress; Singer; Presenter
- Years active: 1992–present
- Spouses: Thijs Römer (m. 2006; div. 2015); Freek van Noortwijk (m. 2019; div. 2021)
- Children: 2
- Relatives: Birgit Schuurman (sister)

Katja Schuurman (born 19 February 1975) is a Dutch actress, singer and television personality.

== Early life ==
Schuurman grew up as the eldest daughter of a Dutch father and a Curaçao-born Surinamese mother of mixed Dutch, Chinese, Indigenous and African heritage. She is the older sister of singer and actress Birgit Schuurman (1977).

Schuurman attended the Montessori Lyceum Herman Jordan in Zeist, and had early experiences with show business; a small role in tv-series Uit de school geklapt (1993), posing for a magazine, and twice winning the finale of the Soundmixshow with her ballet group.

After obtaining her VWO-diploma Schuurman was unsure of what to do, and to leave all options open she registered to study Political Science at the University of Amsterdam while also signing up for various casting agencies. She ultimately decided to focus on acting instead.

== Career ==
=== 1992–1999 ===
Schuurman made her acting debut in 1993 on the NCRV television series Uit de school geklapt. Her breakthrough came two years later when she resurfaced in the RTL 4 soap Goede tijden, slechte tijden (GTST) as Jessica, one of Govert Harmsen's three nieces.

With two other characters from GTST she formed the spin-off girl group Linda, Roos & Jessica (LR&J). Their debut single "Ademnood" (English version: "Turn Your Love Around") topped the Dutch charts in late 1995.

Schuurman's film debut came with 1996's De Zeemeerman (The Merman).

She continued to release singles with both LR&J and on her own. She had hits with "Maar nu heb ik er een", "Wereldmeid", "Totaal Verkocht" and "Lover or friend".

By 1999 Schuurman had left the GTST-cast while LR&J disbanded after releasing their farewell single "1999 X".

=== 2000–present ===
In 2000, Schuurman played Frida in the Salou-based movie Costa! and found herself reunited with Georgina Verbaan, who played her sister Hedwig in Goede tijden, slechte tijden. Costa! premiered in 2001 and was successful enough to be adapted into a television series. Schuurman appeared in the first two seasons. She also appeared in the 2022 film Costa!!.

Schuurman went on to host programs for BNN (till 2008), NET5 (2008-2014) and KRO-NCRV (in particular for NCRV from 2014 onwards). In 2019, Schuurman returned to RTL, and in 2024 she was slated to return to GTST to reprise her role as Jessica. Schuurman and Babette van Veen released the song Fout Feestje in 2025. They also performed the song Ademnood at the 2025 Gouden Televizier-Ring Gala.

== Personal life ==
She married actor Thijs Römer (grandson of actor Piet Römer) in Vallery, France on August 8, 2006. Their daughter Sammie was born on 22 April 2013. They divorced in February 2015.

In 2019 Schuurman married chef Freek van Noortwijk. In August 2020 they had a daughter, Schuurman's second child. They divorced in 2021.

== Filmography ==
Television
Year	Title	Role	Notes
1993	Uit de school geklapt		
1995-1999, 2025	Goede tijden, slechte tijden	Jessica Harmsen	
2000-2001	All Stars	Nadja	
2001-2002	Costa!	Frida	
2005	Medea	Medea	
2008-2010	S1NGLE	Stella	
2014-2019	Nieuwe buren	Rebecca	

=== Television series as herself ===
- De Telebel Show (1996)
- So 90's (1997–1999)
- Fox Tours (1999–2000)
- Katja ZKM (2001)
- Top Of The Pops (2001–2004)
- BNN At Work (2001–2005)
- Lijst 0 (2002–2003)
- Mission Unfindable (2003–2004)
- BNN Family (2004)
- BNN presenteert AVRO's Sterrenslag (2004–2005)
- Prettig weekend ondanks alles (2005) (documentary about the murder of Theo van Gogh)
- Try Before You Die (2005–2008)
- Katja vs. Bridget (2005)
- Ranking The Stars (2006)
- Katja vs. de rest (2006–2007)
- Get Smarter In A Week (2007)
- Return to Sender (2007-) (documentary)
- Katja & Sophie (2008)
- Tafel van Vijf (2009)
- Tussen de Oren (2009)
- De Battle (2019)
- De Verraders (2023)
- Het Perfecte Plaatje (2026)

=== Films ===
- Poppycock (1995) (Short film)
- De Zeemeerman (1996)
- No Trains No Planes (1999)
- Zeus (2001) (TV film)
- Costa! (2001)
- Miss Minoes (2001)
- Oesters van Nam Kee (2002)
- The Rules of Attraction (2002)
- Interview (2003)
- Cool! (2004)
- Sextet (2006)
- Interview (2007)
- Kapitein Rob en het Geheim van Professor Lupardi (2007)
- Het wapen van Geldrop (2009)
- Black Out (2012)
- Costa!! (2022)
- Casa Coco (2022)
- De Mannenmaker (2024)
