= Theo van Gogh =

Theo (or Theodore or Theodorus) van Gogh is the name of:

- Theo van Gogh (art dealer) (1857–1891), Dutch art dealer and brother of the painter Vincent van Gogh
- Theo van Gogh (film director) (1957–2004), Dutch film director and great-grandson of the art dealer
