= Renée Fokker =

Dutch actress

- Born: Nijmegen, Netherlands
- Occupation: Actress
- Awards: Golden Calf for Best Actress 1996 Blind Date

Renée Fokker is a Dutch television and film actress. She is known for her roles in the television series Vrouwenvleugel and De zomer van '45. Fokker also won the Golden Calf for Best Actress award for her role in the 1996 film Blind Date.

== Career ==
Fokker studied at the Toneelschool Amsterdam, now known as the Academy of Theatre and Dance, in Amsterdam, Netherlands. She has acted in many plays and television shows, including the television series Hart tegen hard (2011), Zwarte tulp (2015, 2016) and Hotel Beau Séjour (2017). She also appeared in the television series De mannentester (2017) and several episodes of Meiden van de Herengracht, Moordvrouw and Flikken Maastricht.

In 1996, Fokker wrote the script for the film Blind Date together with director Theo van Gogh and actor Peer Mascini. She also won the Golden Calf for Best Actress award for her role in this film. In 2017, she appeared in the film Oh Baby directed by Thomas Acda. In 2018, she appeared as Astrid Holleeder in the play Judas, based on the book with the same name by Astrid Holleeder, the sister of Dutch criminal Willem Holleeder.

In 2019, Fokker appeared in the speed skating television show De ijzersterkste. In 2020, she appeared in Life as It Should Be, the film adaptation of the book Alles is zoals het zou moeten zijn by Dutch model and host Daphne Deckers.

Fokker was one of the contestants in the twenty-first season (2021) of the Dutch television series Wie is de Mol?. She was the Mole of this season of the show.

Since 2024, she plays a role in the war musical 40-45.

== Awards ==
- 1996: Golden Calf for Best Actress, Blind Date

== Selected filmography ==
- 1992: Above the Mountains
- 1995: The Purse Snatcher
- 1996: Blind Date
- 2010: Loft
- 2012: Black Out
- 2020: Life as It Should Be
