= Gogh =

Gogh may refer to:

- Gogh, the Dutch name for Goch, a town near Kleve in North Rhine-Westphalia, Germany
- Szilvia Gogh, a Hungarian scuba diver and stunt performer
- Vincent van Gogh, a Dutch painter
- Van Gogh (disambiguation)
