= Thijs Römer =

Dutch actor (born 1978)

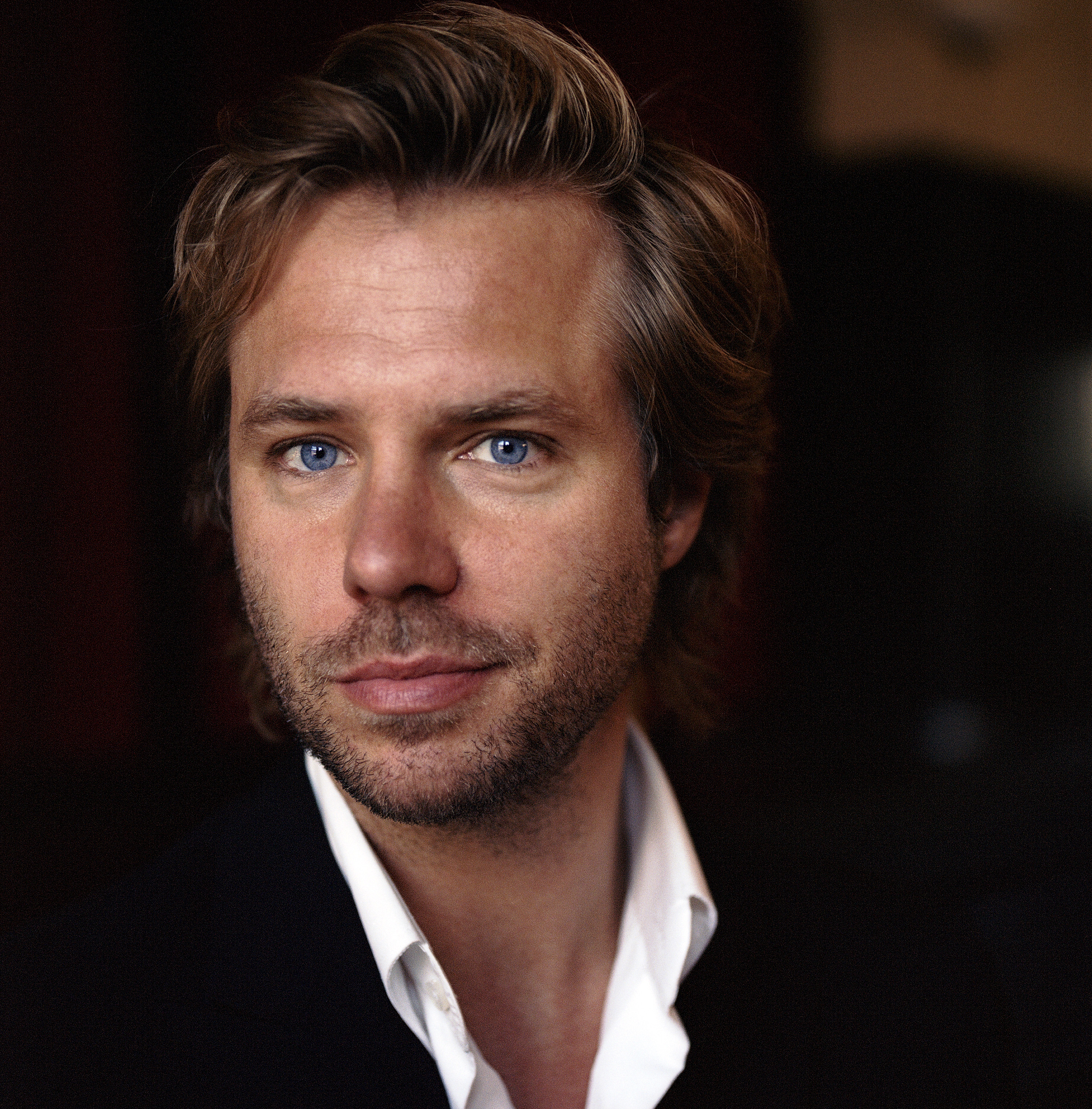
- Born: 26 July 1978 (age 47); Amsterdam, Netherlands
- Occupations: Actor, producer, writer, director
- Years active: 2000–2023
- Spouses: Katja Schuurman (m. 2006; div. 2015) Igone de Jongh (m. 2019; div. 2023)
- Children: 1
- Relatives: Piet Römer (grandfather)

Thijs Römer (born 26 July 1978) is a Dutch actor. He has appeared in more than twenty films and television shows since 2002.

== Career ==
Römer began his career in theater, playing his first roles in 1998 in the play De Zeven Deugden: Doolhof en Orestes, and he also appeared in the film version of the play. In 2002 he co-founded the theater group Annette Speelt together with his colleagues from the theater school in Amsterdam.

In the same year he made his debut on television in the show Najib en Julia, directed by Theo van Gogh.

The following years saw him acting in other projects directed by van Gogh: Cool! (2004), 06/05 (2004) and Medea (2005). For his role in 06/05 he received the Golden Calf award for best actor in 2005.

Römer made his English language acting debut in 2007's Blind Date.

In 2012 Römer appeared on the cover of L'HOMO, the LGBTQ edition of the magazine Linda, where he was shown French kissing actor Tygo Gernarndt.

In 2013 he received a Rembrandt award for best actor for his role in the film Alles is familie (Family Way).

== Grooming case ==
On 17 November 2022 Dutch authorities announced Römer would be prosecuted for alleged grooming of underaged girls on the internet. The grooming case went to trial in July 2023; testimony was given about how Römer messaged three young girls (one was 14 at the time) who were fans of his, asked for naked photos, engaged in sex talk, and sent them dick pics. Römer claimed he was taking responsibility for his actions, and defended himself by saying he was raised in a liberal way and saw himself as a caregiver ("hulpverlener") towards the girls. On 8 August he was sentenced to 240 hours of community service and a month of prison time (90 days, 60 of them suspended). He was acquitted of having sent unsolicited graphic images, since it was part of a conversation that was sexual in nature.

== Personal life ==
Römer was married to actress Katja Schuurman; they were divorced in February 2015. Since the end of 2016 he was in a relationship with ballerina Igone de Jongh; they were married in October 2019. In January 2023 she announced her divorce from actor Römer.

== Selected filmography ==
Film
Year	Title	Role	Notes
2019	F*ck Love	Jim	
2018	Holiday		
2018	Spider-Man: Into the Spider-Verse	Peter B. Parker/Spider-Man	Dutch Voice
2018	Dik Trom (film)	Dolf	
2013	Daylight	Benschop	
2012	Family Way		
2009	Stella's oorlog	Sander	
2007	Blind Date		
2007	Kapitein Rob en het Geheim van Professor Lupardi	Kapitein Rob	
2006	Keep Off	Director	
2004	06/05		

Television
Year	Title	Role	Notes
2014-2019	Nieuwe buren	Steef	
2012-2018	Moordvrouw	Evert Numan	
2005	Medea	Jason	

== Awards ==
- Golden Calf for Best Actor (2005)
- Rembrandt Award for Best Dutch Actor (2013)
