= Tara Elders =

Dutch actress (born 1980)

- Born: Tara Johanna Elders; 17 January 1980 (age 46); Amsterdam, North Holland, Netherlands
- Occupation: Actress
- Years active: 2001–2009
- Spouse: Michiel Huisman (m. 2008)
- Children: 1

Tara Johanna Elders (Dutch pronunciation: [ˈtaːraː joːˈɦɑnaː ˈʔɛldərs]; born 17 January 1980) is a retired Dutch actress. She has been in Dutch films and TV series. She also was in the American film Interview (2007).

== Early life and education ==
Tara Johanna Elders was born on 17 January 1980 in Amsterdam in the Netherlands.

She studied acting at De Trap, an acting school in Amsterdam.

== Acting career ==
She participated in the alternative talent show Ben ik in beeld? on Dutch national television. After some minor roles, Elders played Fleur Lion in the TV series TV7 (2002) about a fictional television station.

She played in the TV series Najib en Julia (2002), the film 06/05 (2004), and the TV mini series Medea (2005), all written and directed by Theo van Gogh. She also was in the American film Interview (2007), directed by Steve Buscemi, which is a remake of the 2003 Dutch film Interview of Theo van Gogh.

Other films she played in are Phileine Says Sorry (2003), Pipo en de p-p-Parelridder (2003), Hush Hush Baby (2004), and Vox populi (2008).

== Personal life ==
Elders married Dutch actor Michiel Huisman in a ceremony in 2008. They have one daughter (born 2007). Elders retired from acting in 2009 in order to be a full-time mother. They lived in New Orleans, Louisiana, US until 2017, when they moved to New York City.

== Filmography ==
=== Films ===
Year	Title	Role	Notes
2001	Vroeger bestaat niet meer	Roos	TV movie
2001	De val	Nurse	Short film
2001	Mis	Sofie	Short film
2003	Loverboy	Julia	TV movie
2003	Phileine Says Sorry	Lala	
2003	Pipo en de p-p-Parelridder	Jonkvrouw Filette de Bonban	
2003	Stratosphere Girl	Polly	
2004	Hush Hush Baby	Britt	
2004	Feestje!	Maartje	
2004	Visions of Europe		Segment "Euroquiz"
2004	Floris		Uncredited
2004	06/05	Ayse Him	
2005	Boy Meets Girl Stories #1: Smachten		Short film
2007	Interview	Maggie	
2007	SEXtet	Lotje	
2007	Funny Dewdrop	Funny Dewdrop	Short film
2007	De muze	Monica	
2008	Vox populi	Zoë	
2008	Het wapen van Geldrop	Maddox	
2009	Winterland	Tara Elders	

=== TV series ===
Year	Title	Role	Notes
2001	Costa!	Cindy	Episode "Zwoele nachten en Natte T-shirts"
2001	All stars – De serie	Nurse #1	Episode "Shampoo voor een proefkonijn"
2002	TV7	Fleur Lion	Starring (8 episodes)
2002	Najib en Julia	Julia Ruisbroek	Starring (13 episodes)
2003	Spangen	Brenda	Episode "Scheuren"
2004	De band	Yvonne	Episode "Therapeutisch"
2004	Russen	Myrna	Episode "Verdwaald"
2005	Medea	Anne	Starring (6 episodes)
