= 06/05 =

2004 film directed by Theo van Gogh

- Directed by: Theo van Gogh
- Written by: Tomas Ross
- Based on: De Zesde Mei by Tomas Ross
- Produced by: Gijs van Westelaken
- Starring: Tara Elders; Thijs Römer; Johnny de Mol; Tooske Ragas
- Cinematography: Thomas Kist
- Edited by: Merel Notten
- Music by: Rainer Hensel
- Distributed by: Inspire Pictures
- Release date: 12 December 2004
- Running time: 120 minutes
- Country: Netherlands
- Language: Dutch
- Budget: €1,200,000

06/05, called May 6th in most English-speaking countries, is a Dutch 2004 film directed by Theo van Gogh, based on the novel De Zesde Mei by Tomas Ross.

The film is a fictional version of the events that led to the assassination of the Dutch politician Pim Fortuyn on 6 May 2002. The lines between reality and fiction are blurred in 06/05. It is the last film of Theo van Gogh, who was himself assassinated in 2004.

Theo van Gogh struck a deal with the Dutch branch of internet provider Tiscali over the film's finances. The movie was originally released in December 2004 on the internet, a situation that had never before been seen in the Netherlands; it could be watched via pay-on-demand. It was released in cinemas one month later, in January 2005.

== Cast ==
- Tara Elders as Ayse Him
- Thijs Römer as Jim de Booy
- Johnny de Mol as NRC editor
- Reinout Bussemaker as Volkert van der G
- Marcel Hensema as Wester
- Caro Lenssen as Marije
- Jack Wouterse as Van Dam
- Cahit Ölmez
- Tooske Ragas-Breugem as Stewardess

== Accolades ==
- Thijs Römer, 2005 Golden Calf award for Best Actor
- Official Selection, 2005 Toronto International Film Festival
