= Van Gogh (surname) =

Van Gogh is a Dutch toponymic surname meaning "from/of Goch", a town on the border of the Netherlands in the Kleve District of Germany. It is an uncommon surname (792 people in the Netherlands in 2007), and most people are, like the painter Vincent van Gogh, descendant of Gerrit van Goch, who married in 1631 in The Hague. People with the surname include:

- Anna van Gogh-Kaulbach (1869–1960), Dutch novelist, translator and playwright
- Johanna van Gogh-Bonger (1862–1925), Dutch wife of Theo and key player in the spread of Vincent's fame
- Johannes van Gogh (1817–1885), Dutch vice admiral, uncle of Vincent
- Lothar van Gogh (1888–1945), Dutch footballer
- Lieuwe van Gogh (born 1991), Dutch painter and great-great-grandson of the art dealer
- Natalie van Gogh (born 1974), Dutch racing cyclist
- Rick van Gog (born 1957), Canadian-born Dutch ice hockey player
- Theo van Gogh (art dealer) (1857–1891), Dutch art dealer and brother of Vincent
- Theo van Gogh (film director) (1957–2004), assassinated Dutch film director and great-grandson of the art dealer
- Vincent van Gogh (1853–1890), Dutch Post-Impressionist painter
- Vincent Willem van Gogh (1890–1978), Dutch engineer, son of Theo, and founder of the Van Gogh Museum
- Wil van Gogh (1862–1941), Dutch feminist, youngest sister of Vincent and Theo
- Frank van Gogh (1955–2022), Dutch Australian business leader

== See also ==
- Van Gogh's family in his art
