= Deep Inside (disambiguation) =

"Deep Inside" is a 1999 song by Mary J. Blige.

Deep Inside may also refer to:

- Deep Inside, a 1994 album by Chris Jasper
- "Deep Inside", a 1986 song by Fatal Flowers
- "Deep Inside", a 1989 song by Skrewdriver
