= Van Gogh (disambiguation) =

Vincent van Gogh (1853–1890) was a post-impressionist Dutch painter.

Van Gogh may also refer to:

== Film ==
- Van Gogh (1948 film), a film by Alain Resnais
- Van Gogh (1991 film), a film by Maurice Pialat

== Music ==
- Van Go (album), a 1986 album by the Beat Farmers
- Van Gogh (band), a Serbian rock band
  - Van Gogh (Van Gogh album)
- Mike Dirnt or Van Gough, musician in the Green Day side project The Network
- Van Gogh, an album by Ras Kass
- Van Gogh, a 1991 video opera by Michael Gordon
  - Van Gogh, a 2007 album by Alarm Will Sound of the 2003 version of the opera
- "Van Gogh", a 2022 song by Stand Atlantic from F.E.A.R.

== Other uses ==
- Van Gogh (surname), a surname (and list of people with the surname)
- Van Gogh (horse), Thoroughbred racehorse
- Mv Van Gogh, a Dutch-owned passenger cruise ship
- Van Gogh Primary, a primary school in London named after Vincent Van Gogh

== See also ==
- Vincent van Gogh (disambiguation)
- Vango (disambiguation)
