= Peer Mascini =

Dutch actor and writer (1941–2019)

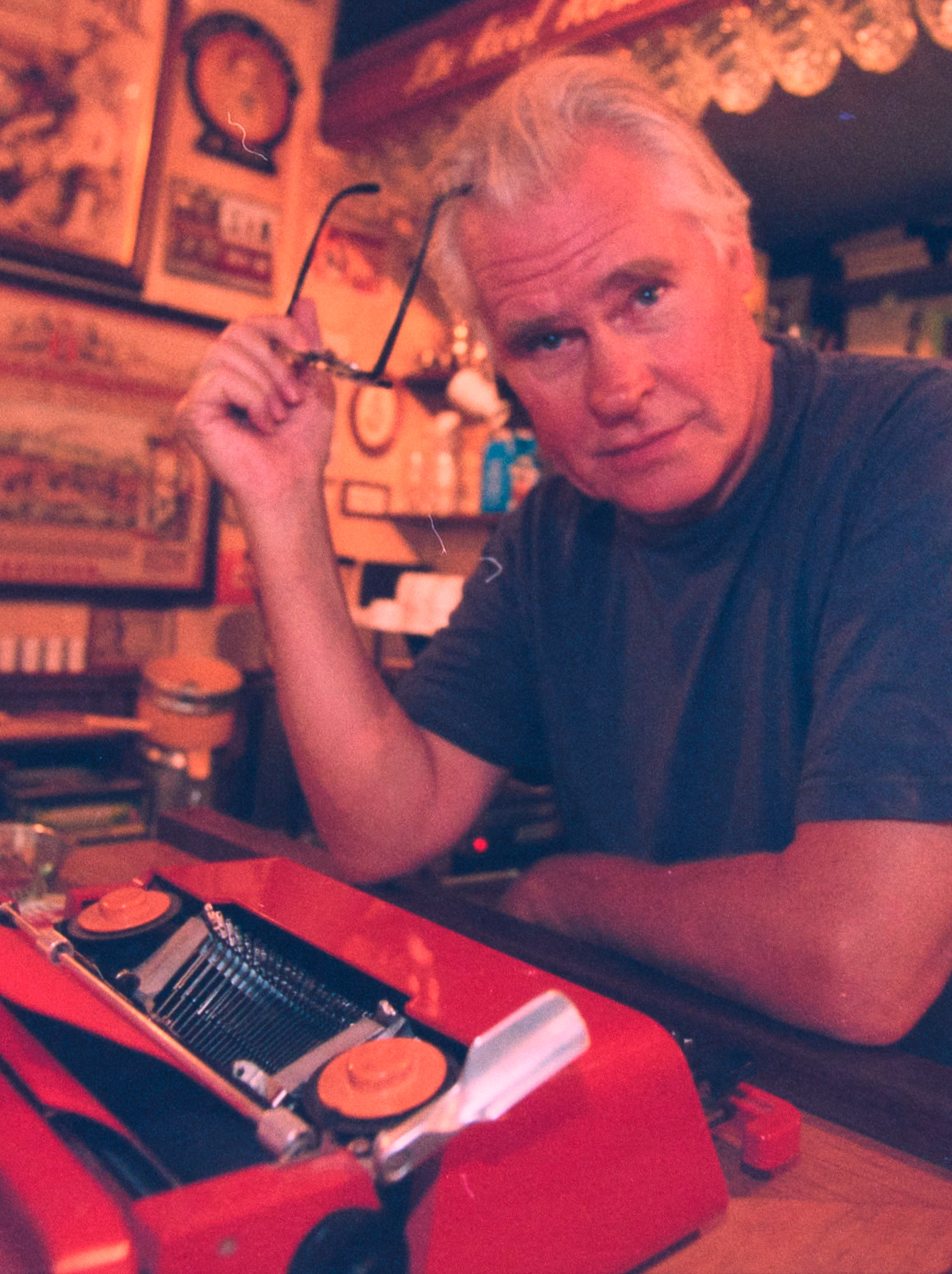
- Mascini in 2000
- Born: Petrus Johannes Maria Mascini; 23 March 1941; Heemstede, North Holland, Netherlands
- Died: 16 May 2019 (aged 78); Amsterdam, North Holland, Netherlands
- Occupation: Actor
- Years active: 1975–2019

Petrus Johannes Maria "Peer" Mascini (23 March 1941 – 16 May 2019) was a Dutch actor and writer. He is well known for his work in Blind Date (1996) and De eenzame oorlog van Koos Tak (1996). He was a recipient of Golden Calf award.

== Career ==
For many years Mascini was part of the theater group Hauser Orkater.

In 1996, he won the Golden Calf for Best Actor award at the Netherlands Film Festival for his role in the film Blind Date by Theo van Gogh. Mascini wrote the film together with Van Gogh and Renée Fokker. Mascini also played a role in the 2007 English-language remake Blind Date by Stanley Tucci.

In the Netherlands he is known for his role in Melkunie television commercials and in particular a 1997 commercial which won the Gouden Loeki award for best Dutch commercial of the year. In the commercial Mascini becomes wet as a result of a cow jumping into a swimming pool and his response "Nog zo gezegd: geen bommetje!" (Dutch for "As I clearly said: no cannonball!") became a well-known phrase in the Netherlands. The Melkunie brand was discontinued in 2001 and reintroduced in 2012. Mascini reappeared in various commercials as part of the brand's relaunch.

== Death ==
Mascini died on 16 May 2019, at the age of 78.

== Awards ==
- 1996: Golden Calf for Best Actor, Blind Date

== Selected filmography ==
- 1983: De Lift
- 1986: Abel
- 1991: Oh Boy!
- 1992: Ik ga naar Tahiti
- 1995: Filmpje!
- 1996: Blind Date
- 1998: Het 14e kippetje
- 1999: Jesus Is a Palestinian
- 1999: No Trains No Planes
- 2006: Het Woeden der Gehele Wereld
- 2007: Blind Date
