= Blind Date (2007 film) =

- Theatrical release poster
- Directed by: Stanley Tucci
- Written by: Stanley Tucci; David Schechter
- Produced by: Bruce Weiss; Gijs van de Westelaken
- Starring: Stanley Tucci; Patricia Clarkson
- Cinematography: Thomas Kist
- Edited by: Camilla Toniolo
- Music by: Evan Lurie
- Distributed by: Variance Films
- Release dates: October 30, 2007 (São Paulo International Film Festival); September 19, 2009 (United States)
- Running time: 80 minutes
- Country: United States
- Language: English

Blind Date is a 2007 American drama film directed by Stanley Tucci, who also stars and co-wrote the screenplay with David Schechter. The film premiered at the 2008 Sundance Film Festival. The film is a remake of the 1996 film of the same name by the late Dutch director Theo van Gogh.

== Premise ==
While struggling to reconnect after the death of their daughter, a married couple construct an elaborate game of pretend on a series of blind dates, hoping that they will be able to openly talk about the state of their relationship in the wake of tragedy.

== Cast ==
- Stanley Tucci as Don, the husband
- Patricia Clarkson as Janna, the wife
- Thijs Römer as the waiter
- Gerdy De Decker as the tango dancer
- Georgina Verbaan as the cute woman
- Robin Holzauer as the little girl
- Sarah Hyland as the child
- Peer Mascini as the sole drinker
