= Blind Date (1996 film) =

1996 film by Theo van Gogh

- Theatrical release poster
- Directed by: Theo van Gogh
- Written by: Tom Erisman; Renée Fokker; Theo van Gogh; Kim van Kooten; Peer Mascini
- Produced by: Theo van Gogh; Erik Peters
- Starring: Renée Fokker; Peer Mascini; Roeland Fernhout; Wouter Brave; Jan Jaspers; Boris Bergshoeff; Lizet Hupkes
- Cinematography: Tom Erisman
- Edited by: Ot Louw
- Music by: Reinier Henzel
- Production companies: Theo van Gogh Produkties
- Distributed by: Shooting Star Filmdistribution
- Release date: 29 August 1996
- Running time: 90 minutes
- Country: Netherlands
- Language: Dutch
- Budget: ƒ 300,000

Blind Date is a 1996 Dutch film by director Theo van Gogh.

In 1996, the film was nominated for four Golden Calves at the Netherlands Film Festival and won three.

In 2007, Stanley Tucci released a remake of the film.
