= Vincent van Gogh (disambiguation) =

Vincent van Gogh was a Dutch painter.

Vincent van Gogh may also refer to:

- Vincent van Gogh (Kodallı opera)
- Vincent van Gogh (Russell painting)
- Vincent Willem van Gogh, art collector, engineer, and nephew of the painter,

== See also ==
- Van Gogh (disambiguation)
