= Ellen ten Damme =

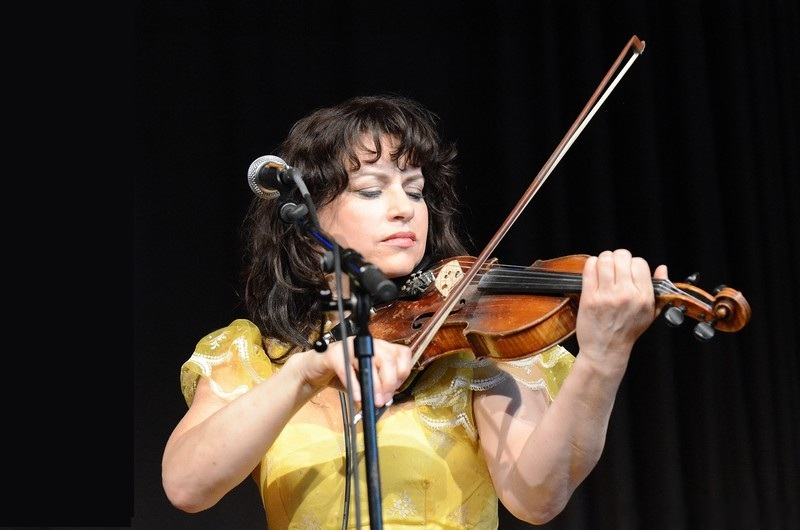
- 2012 concert performance

Background information
- Born: 7 October 1967 (age 57); Warnsveld, Netherlands
- Occupations: actress, musician, singer-songwriter
- Years active: 1989–present
- Website: ellentendamme.nl

Ellen ten Damme (born 7 October 1967) is a Dutch actress, singer-songwriter and multi-instrumentalist. Ten Damme both sings and acts in four languages (Dutch, English, French and German), and plays piano and keyboards, guitar and violin. During her school years Ellen was an enthusiastic gymnast, and incorporating some gymnastic tricks or even circus acts into her shows has become a trademark.

Ten Damme grew up in the rural village of Roden, close to the university town Groningen, where she studied Dutch for a while. However she switched to the Amsterdam Theatre School for stage, film, cabaret and musical actors. After spending a great deal of time in Germany, Ten Damme returned to Amsterdam, where she lives on a houseboat.

== Acting ==
After a few small Dutch TV roles, Ten Damme made her film debut starring in the 1991 short film The Tears of Maria Machita (Note: Original title: De Tranen van Maria Machita) by director Paul Ruven, and was nominated for a Golden Calf movie award. Since then Ten Damme has consistently worked in TV and film – mostly in Dutch and German, and mostly in supporting roles and guest parts. Examples are recurring parts in Dutch comedy series We zijn weer thuis (1993) and Jiskefet (1995–1997), and appearing in 25 episodes of lawyer drama Pleidooi (1993–1995). Further movie parts included The Little Blonde, Dead (1993), No Trains No Planes (1999), Full Moon Party (2002) and Interview (2003), directed by Theo van Gogh. In 2000 Ten Damme played an English language leading role in Irish film drama Conamara.

In 2013 she featured in the World War II theatre comedy To Be or Not to Be, based on the Ernst Lubitsch film of the same name alongside Waldemar Torenstra, Raoul Heertje, Frank Lammers and others.

== Music and artistry ==
Ellen ten Damme has released five studio albums and one live CD. The first three: Kill Your Darlings (1995), I Am Here (2001) and Impossible Girl (2007) are in English. The next two albums: Durf jij (2011) and Het Regende Zon (2012) are in Dutch. Her latest CD, Berlin (2014) is a live cut of a German language concert at the Royal Dutch Concertgebouw.

In 1996–1997, ten Damme joined new wave band Soviet Sex which featured painter/photographer Peter Klashorst. In 2003–2004, she accompanied German rock musician Udo Lindenberg on the tour for his album Atlantic Affairs. In 2005, she competed to represent Germany in the annual Eurovision Song Contest, singing "Plattgefickt", (Note: Translates as "fucked flat" or "fucked from the top down ".) a provocative anti-war protest song written by Lindenberg.

Guitarist Robin Berlijn (who has played with Sam Lapides and Shannon Lyon) has recorded and performed with her for many years.

She has recorded songs that appear on movie soundtracks such as Casper: A Spirited Beginning and Turbo: A Power Rangers Movie. Dutch avant garde filmmaker Cyrus Frisch directed her music video "Stay".
