= Vox populi (film) =

2008 film by Eddy Terstall

- Theatrical release poster
- Directed by: Eddy Terstall
- Screenplay by: Eddy Terstall
- Produced by: Imko Nieuwenhuijs
- Starring: Tom Jansen; Tara Elders; Johnny de Mol
- Cinematography: Gabor Deak
- Edited by: Michiel Reichwein
- Music by: Spinvis
- Distributed by: A-Film Distribution
- Release date: 26 September 2008
- Country: Netherlands
- Language: Dutch

Vox populi is a 2008 Dutch political satire comedy film written and directed by Eddy Terstall. The lead roles are played by Tom Jansen, Tara Elders, and Johnny de Mol. Ton Kas won a Golden Calf Award for Best Supporting Actor.

Together with Simon in 2004 and SEXtet in 2007, it is part of a trilogy about contemporary Dutch society. It received mainly average reviews.

== Plot ==
Jos Fransen (Jansen) is a veteran politician experiencing a midlife crisis. He's the leader of the left-wing party Rood-Groen (Red-Green), but the party hasn't been polling well lately. His daughter Zoë (Elders) starts dating military police officer Sjef (De Mol). Sjef's father Nico (Kas) is an authentic Amsterdam car salesman who hates politicians. Through the eyes of Sjef and Nico, Jos is starting to get a feel of how "the people" look at politics. Inspired by Sjef, Nico, and Sjef's Yugoslav brother-in-law Savo, Jos Fransen starts including more populist ideas into his, previously, politically correct party and starts rising in the opinion polls. This all much to the chagrin of his elitist fellow party members.

== Cast ==
- Tom Jansen as Jos Fransen
- Johnny de Mol as Sjef
- Esmarel Gasman as Nina
- Tara Elders as Zoë
- Bata Miodrag Milojevic as Savo
- Femke Lakerveld as Mira
- Ton Kas as Nico
- Marion van Thijn as Geesje
- Beppie Melissen as Gees
- Hilde Van Mieghem as Peggy
