= Medea (TV serial) =

Dutch television series

Medea is a 2005 Dutch television serial in six episodes directed by Theo van Gogh, starring Katja Schuurman, Thijs Römer and Tara Elders. It tells the story of the daughter of a politician who tries to help her selfish boyfriend to become the prime minister of the Netherlands.

The screenplay was written by Theodor Holman and is a take on Euripides' play Medea, with the story moved to contemporary Dutch politics. The serial was produced by Column Film for the broadcaster AVRO.

It won the Special Prize and was nominated for the Golden Calf for Best Television Drama at the 2005 Netherlands Film Festival.

== Cast ==
- Katja Schuurman as Medea
- Thijs Römer as Jason
- Tara Elders as Anne
- Krijn ter Braak as Moyra
- Cas Enklaar as Middelink
- Jochum ten Haaf as Frederik
- Maarten Wansink as Jensma
- Marcel Hensema as Matthijs
- Eric van Sauers as Robin
- Dragan Bakema as Thomas
- Cees Geel as Bertje
- Astrid van Eck as Xandra
- Monic Hendrickx as de Vries
