= Sam Lapides =

American singer-songwriter and guitarist

Sam Lapides in Los Angeles, 2026

Sam Lapides (born David Samuel Lapides, August 14, 1962, Irvington, New Jersey) is an American singer-songwriter, known as the guitarist and lead vocalist for the bands Ghosthouse and Folkminers. He cites Paul Westerberg, The Replacements, The Rolling Stones, and Bob Dylan as influences. His folk-rock sound has been classified as Americana (music). Throughout his career, he has produced a variety of recordings and completed numerous tours of the United States and Europe. Sam does a weekly show called "Saturdays with Sam."

== Early career ==
As the youngest of five children, Lapides was raised on the East Coast, moving between New Jersey and Maryland. He settled in Ann Arbor, Michigan where he attended Community High School where he played drums and joined local band The Evaders. He began playing guitar and started busking on the campus of the University of Michigan. In 1987, he recruited a band to play his songs. The Folkminers developed a rapid local following and released a cassette recording and a self-titled EP.

== History ==
The Folkminers disbanded in 1988 and Lapides moved to Boston and then Los Angeles in pursuit of a music career. Like on the streets of Ann Arbor and in the subway stations of Boston, Lapides continued the folk tradition of street performance and occasionally played on the boardwalk of Venice Beach. One day while performing a song by Dream Syndicate, the song's author and indie-rock legend Steve Wynn (songwriter) happened to walk by. Wynn liked the rendition so much that he decided to produce several songs.

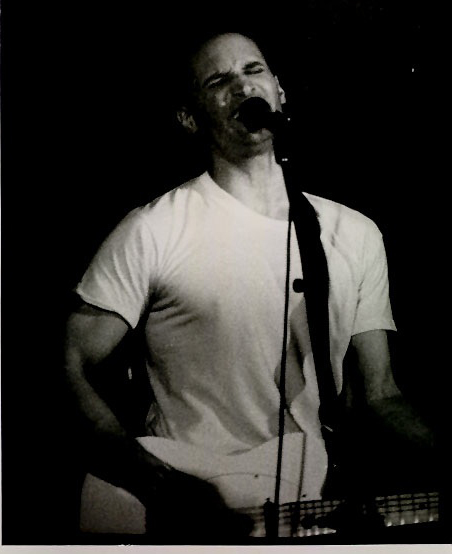
Sam Lapides performing, 1998

At this time Lapides had just formed his band Ghosthouse. Another of Lapides’ heroes, ex-Rain Parade guitarist John Thoman, joined the group. They released their self-titled "Ghosthouse" on Italy's Club de Musique Records. They toured Europe several times in 1994 and signed with European label Semaphore. Ghosthouse released their third full-length recording "Thing Called Life" in 1995 on Semaphore. It was released in the United States on Birdcage Records in 1996. They toured with label mate Stan Ridgway several times. The band continued performing and recording until they disbanded in 1997.

During a brief move back to Boston, Lapides put together a band,(featuring noted local bassist Christian T. Bachmann) to record new material for his first solo CD, "Wake up from the Wasteland" on Bluerose Records. The release was met with critical acclaim and Lapides moved again to Los Angeles. After another solo CD, "We’ve Walked These Streets" on Inbetweens Records and several European tours and the successful re-release of the original "Ghosthouse" CD, Lapides decided to reform Ghosthouse.

In 2003, the band reformed. In 2004 they released "Devotion" on Bluerose Records. To support the CD, Sam toured the Netherlands and Denmark where he was joined by guitarist Robin Berlijn of Fatal Flowers and Ellen ten Damme. In 2006 he released a CD of cover songs "Ghost in Me" in tribute to some of his favorite artists and to commemorate his history doing covers and busking.

Between 2006 and 2014, Sam Lapides played shows in Europe and Los Angeles with various friends.

In early 2014, Sam formed a new band called Sam Lapides and the Rotten Liars. The band included Cliff Conley on guitar, David Dieckman on bass, and Kristin King on drums. Cliff, who played with The Chi-Lites and Eugene Record, brought a R & B element to Sam's songs giving them a bluesy swing. In 2015, they released a CD entitled "Bodie," named after Bodie, California of a ghost town that inspired Sam to write the new songs on the release. Paul Rutter and Aaron Guitierrez play bass and drums on the "Bodie" CD.

In 2019, Scotty Persico, from The Holy Broken, replaced Cliff Conley on lead guitar.

In 2021, Scotty was replaced by Bill Lloyd. The line-up was Sam Lapides on guitar and vocals, Bill Lloyd on lead guitar, David Dieckman on bass, Kristin King on drums, and Julie Fergus on background vocals.

In 2026, Sam continued to record and perform with Bill Lloyd on guitar and vocals. Bill has produced 5 singles of Sam's latest material. He provided instrumentation beyond Lapides' guitar and vocals.

Sam Lapides lives and works in Los Angeles with his wife and artist Maureen Maki.

== Discography ==
1. Devastated, Cassette, 1986
2. Yesterday's Dreams, Cassette, 1986
3. Folkminers, EP, 1987
4. 2 Feet Down 1,000,000 Miles High, Office Records, Cassette, 1988
5. Take a Place, Cassette, 1988
6. Ghosthouse, Club de Musique Records, CD, 1993
7. Everything is Fine, Live, Club de Musique Records, CD, 1994
8. Great Expectations, Live, Lazy Eye Mini Album, 1995
9. Thing Called Life, Semaphore, CD, 1995
10. Thing Called Life, Birdcage Records, CD, 1996
11. Wake Up from the Wasteland, Bluerose Records, CD, 1998
12. We’ve Walked These Streets, Inbetweens Records, 2001
13. Ghosthouse, Inbetweens Records, CD, 2002
14. Devotion, Bluerose Records, CD, 2004
15. Ghost in Me, CD, 2006
16. Sam Lapides and the Rotten Liars, Bodie 2015
17. Sam Lapides, Confessions of a Killer, 2023
18. Sam Lapides, Anything, 2024
19. Sam Lapides, Living in the Wasteland, 2024
20. Sam Lapides, Kisses in My Pocket, 2026
21. Sam Lapides, Tonight, 2026
