= Ik ga naar Tahiti =

1992 Dutch film

- Written by: Ger Beukenkamp, Dick Willemsen
- Directed by: Gerrard Verhage
- Country of origin: Netherlands
- Original language: Dutch

Production
- Running time: 59 minutes

Original release
- Release: 1992

Ik ga naar Tahiti is a 1992 Dutch film directed by Gerrard Verhage.

== Cast ==
- Hans Dagelet ... Hendrik Nicolaas Werkman
- Peter Tuinman ... Schaap
- Ids van der Krieken ... Capelle
- Willem Becker ... Barnsteen
- Eva van Heijningen ... Adrie
- Esgo Heil ... Glaudé
- Han Kerkhoffs ... Hansen
- Bert Luppes ... Henkels
- Peer Mascini ... Sandberg
- Barbara Pouwels ... Dina
- Els Ingeborg Smits ... Greet
