= Crocodiles in Amsterdam =

1990 film

Krokodillen in Amsterdam
- Directed by: Annette Apon
- Release date: 1990
- Running time: 88 minutes
- Country: Netherlands
- Language: Dutch

Crocodiles in Amsterdam or Krokodillen in Amsterdam is a 1990 Dutch comedy film directed by Annette Apon.

== Cast ==
- Joan Nederlof ... Gino
- Yolanda Entius ... Nina
- Hans Hoes ... Jacques
- Marcel Musters ... Jerry
- Trudie Lute ... Charlotte
- Jaap ten Holt ... Peter
- Evert van der Meulen ... Adje
- Truus te Selle ... Moeder
- Olga Zuiderhoek ... Mevrouw Top
- Cahit Ölmez ... Alex
- Khaldoun Elmecky ... Koos
- Fried Mertens ... Mike
- Carel Alphenaar ... Oom Victor
- Daria Mohr ... Theresa
- Wim Meuwissen ... Makelaar
