= Theodor Holman =

Dutch journalist, presenter, and writer

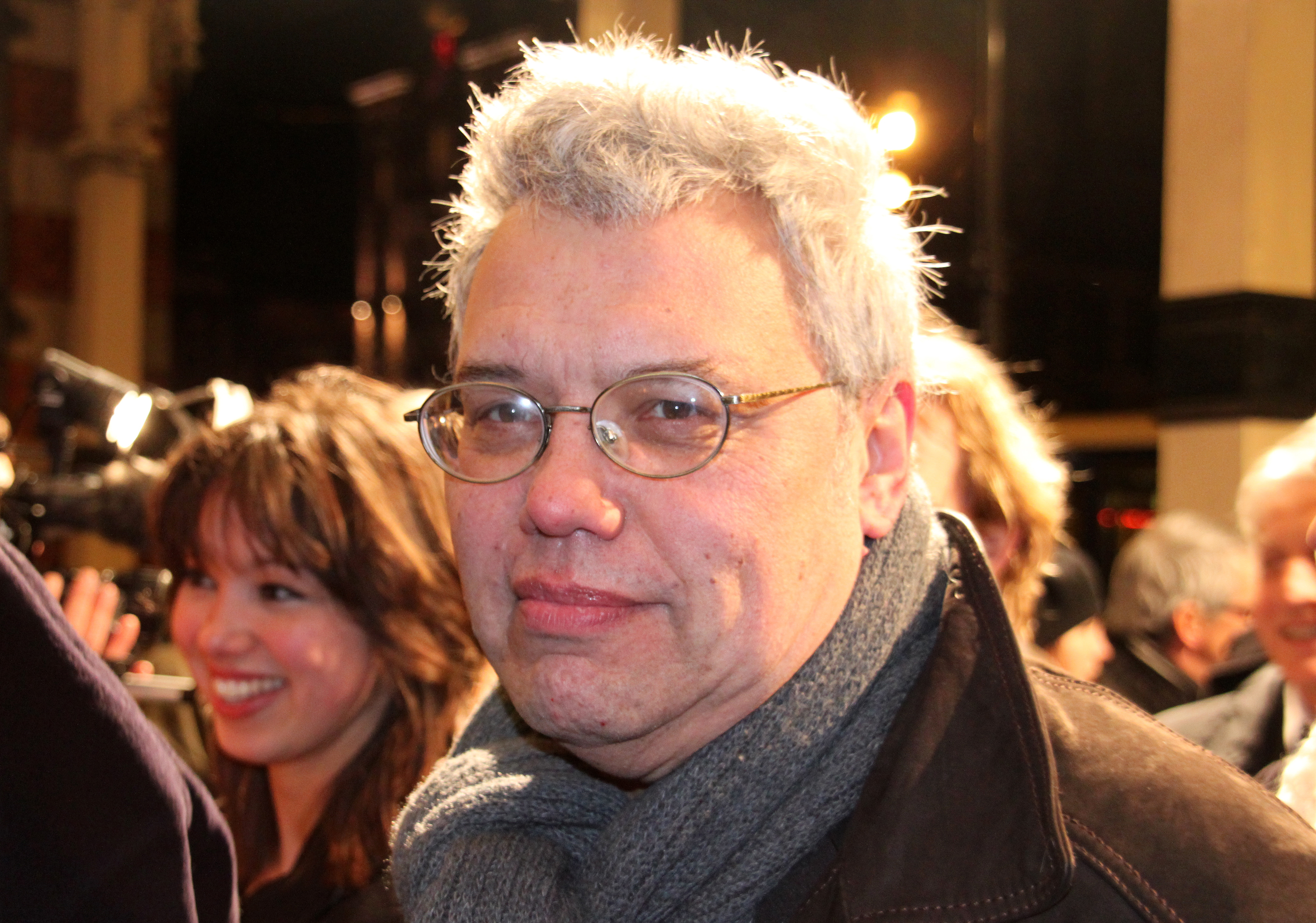
- Theodoor Holman
- Born: 9 January 1953 (age 73); Amsterdam
- Citizenship: Netherlands
- Education: University of Amsterdam
- Occupations: journalist, presenter, and writer

Theodor Holman (born 9 January 1953 in Amsterdam) is a Dutch journalist, presenter, and writer of Indo descent.

He studied Dutch language and History at the University of Amsterdam. He was editor of the satirical student newspaper Propria Cures.

His play Breivik meets Wilders (Dutch: Breivik ontmoet Wilders) depicts a fictional meeting between Anders Behring Breivik and controversial Dutch lawmaker Geert Wilders at London's Heathrow airport in March 2010. The play was staged at Amsterdam's De Balie theatre. Other plays are currently under development in Sweden and the UK.

== Bibliography ==
- Een lekker leven - A nice life (1986)
- Apenliefde - Monkeylove (1991)
- Familiefeest - Family party (1992)
- Hoe ik mijn moeder vermoordde - How I murdered my mother (1999)
- Het blijft toch familie - They're still family (2001)

== Filmography ==
Films as screenwriter:

- Interview (2003)
- Cool! (2004)
- Medea (2005)
- Oorlogsrust (2006)
- Interview (2007)
