= Richard Janssen =

Dutch musician (born 1961)

- Birth name: Richard Janssen
- Born: April 12, 1961 (age 63); Manchester, England
- Origin: Amsterdam, Netherlands
- Genres: Pop, Rock
- Labels: WEA, Mercury

Richard Janssen (born April 12, 1961) is a Dutch musician who was leader of the rock bands Fatal Flowers and Shine. Janssen also works as a stage designer.

== Biography ==
Richard Janssen was born on April 12, 1961, in Manchester, England. His mother and stepfather have Dutch nationality, and his biological father was born in Spain. Richard Janssen was three months old when he arrived in the Netherlands. Janssen grew up in Utrecht. He played from his teenage years in various bands. Around 1980 he moved to Amsterdam, where he studied at the Dutch Film and Television Academy. In the basement of a squat he played with musicians Tijn Touber, Marius Schrader and Marcel Kruup in the band The Pilots. Many members of The Pilots later go under the name Midnight To Six. Background singer Monique Klemann, who would later form Loïs Lane, joined the band. Janssen, now studying at the Film and Television Academy, finishes because he wants to try as a pop musician. Midnight To Six collapses and Touber and Klemann focus on Lois Lane. After Midnight To Six disintegrated, Janssen, together with Henk Jonkers and Marco Braam, forms Fatal Flowers.

Fatal Flowers immediately shows promising signs with WEA. The album is picked up in small circles but has yet made a national breakthrough. In 1986, Younger Days debuts, making the band a leading exponent of the Amsterdam School of Guitar. In 1987, Janssen along with Fatal Flowers are awarded an Edison and are an opening act at Pinkpop. In the spring of 1988 he left with Fatal Flowers to America where the group works on their third album, Johnny D. Is Back! The readers of OOR magazine call the album number one in the Vaderlandse Elpee category 1988. The band gets more recognition to receive the Zilveren Harp and tweede Edison.

Shortly after 1990 they switched to Mercury from WEA record company gave Janssen, however, no pleasure to have in the band and he announced his departure. The remaining band members decided to stop as well. Janssen then played as guest musician on the album Blue by Jack of Hearts. In 1991 he and Jonkers rented a recording studio in Amsterdam to many producers and bands. He was also active as a producer of Spo-Dee-O-Dee. In 1993 he formed the band Shine. Shine was originally a solo project of Janssen which musicians were sought with material produced and written by him perform live. By 1996, after two albums and several personnel changes, the band is indefinitely inactive.

Janssen did not sit still and under his own label Rex Recordings, Janssen releases a debut solo album, Love Baby Love, in a limited edition of 1000. With a number of guest musicians he performed under this name during Noorderslag in 1997. In October 1998, he and Robin Berlijn (ex-Fatal Flowers) and Martijn Bosman (Kane) a 2 Meter Session, with Creep by Radiohead played. Then he played briefly in the backing band of Ellen ten Damme. From 2002 he was a musician involved in various projects of Amsterdam Theatre, and he designed sets for theater Alaska. He translated Elvis Costello's "I Want You" for singer Lucretia van der Fleet in 2007.

== Discography ==
=== Fatal Flowers ===
- 1985 - Fatal Flowers (mini-album)
- 1986 - Younger Days
- 1988 - Johnny D. Is Back!
- 1990 - Pleasure Ground
- 1993 - Fatal Flowers (mini-album Fatal Flowers and album Younger Days released on one CD)
- 2002 - Younger Days - The Definitive Fatal Flowers (compilation album)

=== Shine ===
- 1993 - Boys
- 1995 - Modern Popmusic

=== Rex ===
- 1996 - Love Baby Love
