= No Trains No Planes =

1999 film

- Theatrical release poster
- Directed by: Jos Stelling
- Written by: Hans Heesen; Jos Stelling
- Produced by: Jos Stelling
- Starring: Dirk van Dijck; Ellen Ten Damme; Henri Garcin; Gene Bervoets; Dominique Horwitz; Kees Prins; Katja Schuurman; Peer Mascini; Leny Breederveld; Aat Ceelen; Victor Löw
- Cinematography: Goert Giltay
- Edited by: Bert Rijkelijkhuizen
- Music by: Nicola Piovani
- Production companies: Jos Stelling Filmproducties B.V. VPRO
- Distributed by: Warner Bros.
- Release date: 1 April 1999
- Running time: 105 minutes
- Country: Netherlands
- Language: Dutch

No Trains No Planes is a 1999 Dutch comedy drama film directed by Jos Stelling.

== Cast ==
- Dirk van Dijck as Gerard
- Kees Prins as Jacques
- Peer Mascini as Benny
- Petra Sedda as Balie-juffrouw
- Leny Breederveld as Coby
- Aat Ceelen as Ton
- Ellen Ten Damme as Paula
- Henri Garcin as Joop
- Piet Brouwer as Verschuren
- Jan de Koning as Oude man
- Jacques Bosman as Co
- Raymonde de Kuyper as Wilma
- Thea Breederveld as Guurtje
- Katja Schuurman as Rietje
- Victor Löw as televisiepresentator

== Home media ==
The film was released on DVD on 3 October 2005 by A-Film Home Entertainment as part of the Jos Stelling Box set.

== Accolades ==
Accolades received by No Trains No Planes
Year	Award	Category	Recipient(s)	Result	Ref.
1999	Netherlands Film Festival	Golden Calf for Best Script	Jos Stelling; Hans Heesen	Nominated	
1999	Netherlands Film Festival	Golden Calf for Best Actor	Dirck van Dijk	Nominated	
