= Fatal Flowers =

Dutch blues rock band

The Fatal Flowers
- Album art for Younger Days (from left to right): Braam, Janssen, Heuff, Jonkers

Background information
- Origin: Amsterdam, Netherlands
- Genres: Rock, pop
- Years active: 1984–1990
- Labels: WEA, Mercury
- Past members: Richard Janssen; Henk Jonkers; Marco Braam (1984–1987); Geert de Groot (1987–1990); Erwin Wolters (1984–1985); Dirk Heuff (1985–1988); Robin Berlijn (1988–1990)

The Fatal Flowers were an Amsterdam rock band, active between 1984 and 1990. They were seen as one of the best Dutch bands of the 1980s. The influence of 60s bands and the use rock riffs set them apart from the punk and new wave bands of the time.

== History ==
The Fatal Flowers were founded by Richard Janssen in 1984. They signed a contract with the WEA record company. Under the guidance of top producer Craig Leon an eponymous EP was made – recorded in the Brittania Row Studios, owned by Pink Floyd. The first full album, Younger Days, was produced by Vic Maile. In 1987, the Flowers received an Edison Award for Younger Days. That same year, they were an opening act for Pinkpop.

The band's second full album, Johnny D. Is Back!, was produced by Mick Ronson. With this album, the band took a large step forward and the album was acclaimed by the readers of Oor magazine as the best Dutch album of 1988. Guitarist Dirk Heuff left the band and was replaced by 17-year-old Robin Berlijn. Berlijn also went on to play with other artists including Shannon Lyon and Sam Lapides, Ellen ten Damme, Johan, Kane en Sky Pilots. Fatal Flowers received the Zilveren Harp.

In 1990, the Fatal Flowers left WEA and went to Mercury. They made a new album, Pleasure Ground, which was again produced by Mick Ronson. The album contained no hit single, but was very successful. Janssen left the band in the summer of 1990, disillusioned about their new label's neglect in properly promoting the band abroad. With that, one of the most promising Dutch bands of the era fell apart. In a 1997 interview, Janssen said:

When the Fatal Flowers broke up, people said we were crazy. They said that we were on the verge of an international breakthrough and some financial windfalls. Nonsense! There were very few contacts abroad. However, in the Netherlands, we were at our peak. So it was time to do something else.

On 3 July 2002, the band reunited at The Blue Tea House in Vondelpark for promotion of the compilation album Younger Days – The Definitive Fatal Flowers. There were no upcoming reunion plans, until January 2019, when it was announced the Fatal Flowers would go on a one-off tour again that year.

In 2019, the band played a very successful reunion tour in the Netherlands with two sold out shows at Amsterdam's Paradiso.

In December 2025, the band announced their 2026 festival tour. The band will have the same line-up that had played the 2019 reunion tour, with Richard Janssen, Robin Berlijn, Henk Jonkers and Geert de Groot.

On 6 November 2026 the band played their final performance in Paradiso (Amsterdam).

== Discography ==
=== Albums ===
- 1985 – Fatal Flowers (mini-album)
- 1986 – Younger Days
- 1988 – Johnny D. Is Back!
- 1990 – Pleasure Ground
- 1993 – Fatal Flowers (mini-album Fatal Flowers and album Younger Days released on one CD)
- 2002 – Younger Days – The Definitive Fatal Flowers (compilation album)
- 2019 – Radio Sessions 1985-1990 (compilation album)

=== Singles ===
- 1985 – "Billy" / "Who Loves The Sun"
- 1986 – "Younger Days" / "White Mustang"
- 1987 – "Well Baby Pt. 2" / "Deep Inside"
- 1988 – "Movin' Target" / "Johnny D. Is Back!"
- 1988 – "Rock & Roll Star" / "No Expectations" / "Younger Days"
- 1988 – "Second Chance" / "Second Chance"
- 1990 – "Better Times" / "Heroes"
- 1990 – "Both Ends Burning" / "Burning"
- 1990 – "How Many Years" / "Speed Of Life"
