= Jesus Is a Palestinian =

Jezus is een Palestijn
- Theatrical release poster
- Directed by: Lodewijk Crijns
- Written by: Lodewijk Crijns
- Produced by: Martin Lagestee
- Starring: Hans Teeuwen; Kim van Kooten; Dijn Blom; Peer Mascini
- Cinematography: Menno Westendorp
- Edited by: Wouter Jansen
- Music by: Jeroen Strijbos, Rob van Rijswijk
- Production company: Lagestee Film B.V.
- Distributed by: Warner Bros.
- Release date: 25 March 1999
- Running time: 90 minutes
- Country: Netherlands
- Language: Dutch

Jesus Is a Palestinian (Dutch: Jezus is een Palestijn) is a 1999 Dutch comedy film written and directed by Lodewijk Crijns. The film parodies on religious fanaticism and millennialism, which involves the topics of self mutilation, incest, and euthanasia, is the director's first full-length movie. It premiered at the 1999 International Film Festival Rotterdam.

== Plot ==
Natasha (Kim van Kooten) goes to Limburg to collect her brother Ramses (Hans Teeuwen), who has joined a sect, prying him from the cult so he can consent to cutting their father's life support. The cult's leader Pieter Bouwman frowns upon sexual activity and, to prevent sex from happening, they have put a kind of lock, self-applied by way of piercing on the male member's penises. Ramses slowly develops a mind of his own and falls in love with Natasha's roommate, Lonneke (Dijn Blom). Ramses finds out that his sister and the nursing home staff are essentially trying to kill his father (Peer Mascini), and ends up delivering his father to a crackpot zealous Palestinian who prophesies the return of Christ. In the meantime, the cult is also out to get Ramses back, but Ramses now is unwilling to return to mandatory celibacy.

== Cast ==
- Hans Teeuwen as Ramses
- Kim van Kooten as Natasja
- Dijn Blom as Lonneke
- Peer Mascini as Father
- Najib Amhali as Rashid
- Pieter Bouwman as Sect leader
- Anis de Jong as Guru
- Tygo Gernandt as Steven
- Micha Hulshof
- Orlando MacBean as Abraham
- Sandra Mattie as Girl making out in room
- Ferri Somogyi as Bob
- Waldemar Torenstra as Roy
- Ruben van der Meer as Osiris

== Reception ==
According to NRC Handelsblad, the film was a flop. The Volkskrant critic, in a sometimes positive review, summarized the movie as "occasionally funny, but mostly superficial." David Rooney reviewed the movie for Variety and commented positively on "Crijns' spirited direction and the appealing cast."
