= Vango =

Vango may refer to:

- Alf Vango, an English footballer
- Vango (company), a manufacturer of camping equipment
- Vango Adventure Farm, in Norfolk County, Ontario, Canada
- Vangos, a village in Greece
- Vango, a 2010 book written by Timothée de Fombelle
- Vango (fish), genus of Cretaceous chanid milkfish, containing the single species Vango fahiny

== See also ==
- VangoBooks, a publisher of textbooks, see Pearson Education#Imprints.
