= Lieuwe van Gogh =

Dutch painter and former chef

- Born: 26 August 1991 (age 34); Amsterdam, Netherlands
- Parents: Theodoor van Gogh (father); Heleen Hartmans (mother)
- Relatives: Vincent Willem van Gogh (great-grandfather); Theo van Gogh (great-great-grandfather); Vincent van Gogh (great-great-granduncle)
- Website: https://therealvangogh.com/

Lieuwe van Gogh (Note: In this Dutch name, the surname is Van Gogh, not Gogh.) (born 26 August 1991) is a Dutch painter. He had his first solo exposition in June 2022, opened by cultural historian and State Secretary of Culture and Media Gunay Uslu.

== Life and career ==
Lieuwe van Gogh was born in Amsterdam to film director Theodoor “Theo” van Gogh and Heleen Hartmans. Van Gogh’s great-great-grandfather, Theo van Gogh, was an art dealer and the brother of painter Vincent van Gogh.

In school, Van Gogh preferred drawing to playing soccer, and particularly enjoyed drawing dragons.

Van Gogh was in class a mere few hundred meters from his father on the day he was murdered—he was able to hear the gunshots. The day after his father's murder, he painted a graffiti mural at his mother's home, which was largely removed after they moved out.

Van Gogh obtained his Havo diploma and studied arts for two years. After this, he became a Thaiboxer in South-East Asia. He also worked 10 years as a chef.

In 2014, Van Gogh donated some of his living cells to artist Diemut Strebe for creating a "living artwork", a replica of Vincent van Gogh's severed ear.

During the COVID-19 pandemic lockdowns, he developed his own painting style. Successful sales during his first solo exposition made him realize that his work had value.

The Bed-Stuy Art Residency invited Van Gogh to paint in New York in the summer of 2022 and exhibit his work.

== Style ==
He now uses the mayonnaise bottles he used as a chef, to spray paint on horizontal canvasses. This allows him to work fast, without watching paint dry. Lieuwe uses forks to create unusual eyelashes. Art historian Jhim Lamoree describes Lieuwe's work as "vitalistic".
