= Cahit Ölmez =

Dutch actor (1963–2025)

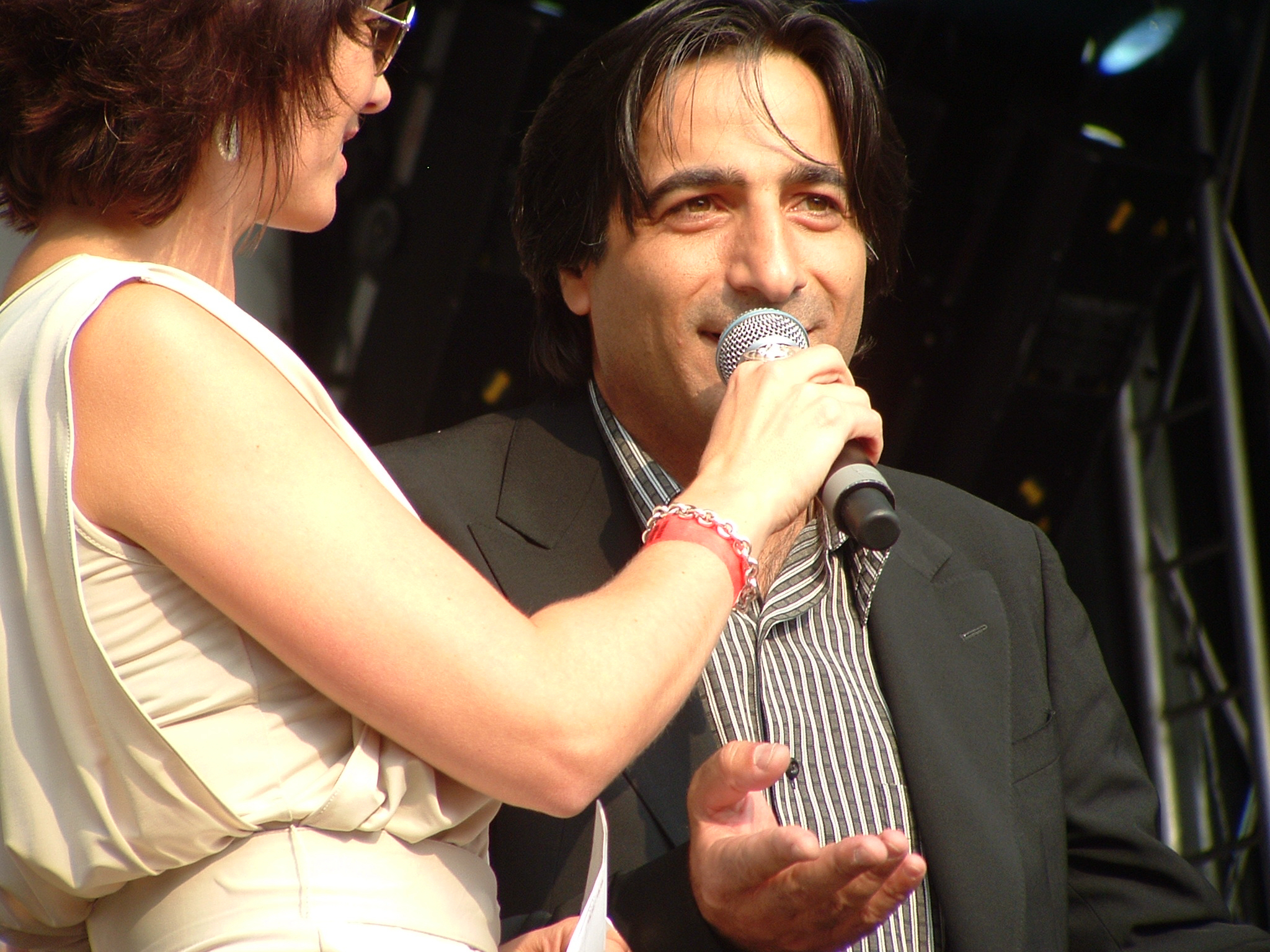
- Born: Huseyin Cahit Ölmez; 24 December 1963
- Died: 21 July 2025 (aged 61)
- Years active: 1989–2025

Cahit Ölmez (24 November 1963 – 21 July 2025) was a Dutch actor of Turkish descent. Ölmez died of cancer on 21 July 2025, at the age of 61.

== Filmography ==
- Gwang tin lung fu wui (1989), Amead
- Krokodillen in Amsterdam (1990), Alex
- Domburg (1996), Metin
- Flikken (1999–2001), Insp. Selattin Ateş
- Najib en Julia (2003, gastrol), Khalid
- Vrijdag de 14e: Erekwestie (2003), Haydar
- Baantjer (2004), Sali Majko
- 06/05 (2004), Erdogan Demir
- Allerzielen (2005), verteller (stem)
- Keyzer & De Boer Advocaten (2006), Mr. Yilmaz
- Van Speijk (2006–2007), Det. Altan Uslu
- Funny Dewdrop (2007)
- Wolfseinde (2008–2009), Kadir Gharsallah
- Shylock (2009)
- Gangsterboys (2010), Karan
- Kom niet aan mijn kinderen (2010), Nizar Zalaq
- Kauwboy (2012)
