= Interview (2003 film) =

- Film poster
- Directed by: Theo van Gogh
- Written by: Theodor Holman; Hans Teeuwen (idea)
- Produced by: Theo van Gogh; Gijs van de Westelaken
- Starring: Katja Schuurman; Pierre Bokma
- Cinematography: Thomas Kist
- Edited by: Léon Verkade
- Music by: Rainer Hensel
- Distributed by: Shooting Star Filmdistribution
- Release date: 29 May 2003
- Running time: 90 minutes
- Country: Netherlands
- Language: Dutch
- Budget: € 90.000

Interview is a 2003 Dutch drama film, directed by Theo van Gogh, starring Katja Schuurman and Pierre Bokma. The film is about a war correspondent having an interview with a soap opera actress.

Katja Schuurman was nominated for a Golden Calf for Best Actress at the 2003 Netherlands Film Festival.

Steve Buscemi's remake of the same name premiered in 2007.

Laurence Postma's Hindi remake The Interview: Night of 26/11 was released in August 2021.

== Plot ==
War correspondent Pierre Peters (Pierre Bokma) is sent by the newspaper he works for to interview soap opera actress Katja (Katja Schuurman). The film describes what happens during the interview inside the house of Katja and also what happens right before and after outside the house.

== Cast ==
- Katja Schuurman as Katja
- Pierre Bokma as Pierre Peters
- Theo Maassen as Theo
- Ellen ten Damme as Ellen
- Michiel de Jong as a soap opera actor
- Tinoes Fenanlamrer as a police officer
- Monique Meijer as a police officer

== Background ==
The idea for the film was from Hans Teeuwen and the screenplay was written by Theodor Holman. Director Theo van Gogh describes in an interview that he had four wishes for the film: "At first the roles of the interviewer and the person being interviewed had to change slightly. I wanted Pierre Bokma for the role of the journalist and three turns in the scenario. And Katja had to win."
