= Tomas Ross (writer) =

Dutch writer (born 1944)

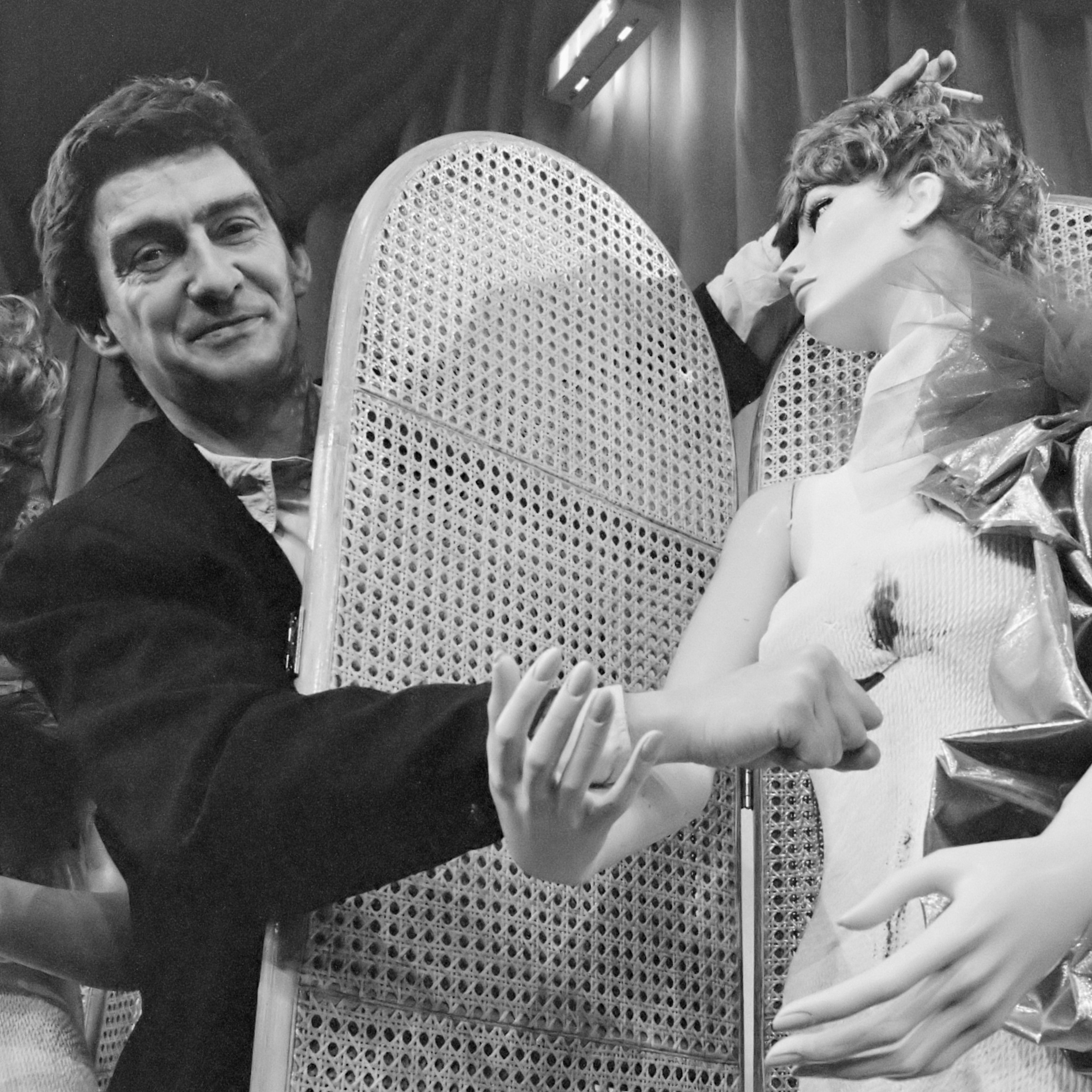
Tomas Ross (1989)

Tomas Ross (Den Bommel, 16 September 1944) is a Dutch writer who is famous for his historical criminal thrillers.

He was born as Willem Pieter Hogendoorn in Den Bommel (Goeree-Overflakkee). He has used the pseudonym Tomas Ross since 1980. His father P.G. Hogendoorn was a member of a resistance group during the 2nd world war.

== Bibliography ==
- 2019: Blonde Dolly
- 2018: Het verdriet van Wilhelmina (The India Trilogy, part 3)
- 2017: De Schaduw en het mysterie van De Denker (in the Literary Jewels series)
- 2017: De onderkoning van Indië (The India Trilogy, part 2)
- 2016: Zwarte weduwe (coauthored by Corine Hartman)
- 2016: Mensenjacht (in the Literary Jewels series)
- 2015: Van de doden niets dan goed (The India Trilogy, part 1)
- 2015: Doodskopvlinder (coauthored by Corine Hartman)
- 2014: De vrienden van Pinocchio
- 2013: De Tweede November
- 2013: De nachtwaker: Het koningscomplot, (who was the biological father of Queen Wilhelmina?)
- 2012: Onze vrouw in Tripoli (about Princess Mabel of Orange-Nassau)
- 2011: Havank Ross: de Schaduw contra de Schorpioen
- 2011: Kort (short stories)
- 2011: Havank Ross: de Schaduw en het mysterie van de Denker
- 2010: De tweede verlosser
- 2010: Havank Ross: Het mysterie van de Nachtwacht
- 2009: Het Meisje uit Buenos Aires (about (Queen) Máxima)
- 2009: Beestachtig
- 2008: Blonde Dolly (serial Haagse Courant)
- 2008: Havank Ross: Caribisch complot
- 2008: De Marionet (about Pim Fortuyn)
- 2007: De Tranen van Mata Hari
- 2006: King Kong (about the Anjercode)
- 2005: De hand van god
- 2005: De Anjercode (about the Dubbelganger)
- 2004: Bloed aan de paal
- 2004: Kidnap co-author: Rinus Ferdinandusse
- 2004: De dubbelganger
- 2003: De klokkenluider
- 2003: De mannen van de maandagochtend co-author: Rinus Ferdinandusse
- 2003: De zesde mei
- 2003: Mathilde
- 2002: De dood van een kroonprins
- 2002: Omwille van de troon
- 2001: Tranen over Hollandia
- 1998: Het goud van Salomon Pinto
- 1997: De vlucht van de vierde oktober
- 1996: Koerier voor Sarajevo
- 1995: De broederschap
- 1994: De man van Sint Maarten
- 1993: Wachters voor Wilhelmina
- 1992: De ingewijden
- 1991: Walhalla
- 1991: De moordmagnaten
- 1990: De vrouw die op Greta Garbo leek (with Maj Sjöwall)
- 1989: Donor
- 1989: Mode voor Moskou
- 1989: De strijders van de regenboog
- 1987: Bèta
- 1984: Het Poesjkin Plan
- 1983: Het verraad van '42
- 1980: De honden van het verraad

=== Children and Teen Fiction ===
- 2002: De man die twee keer verdronk
- 2002: Het geheim van het verdronken dorp
- 1993: De wraak van Victor Baldini
- 1992: Het levende lijk
- 1990: Help, ze ontvoeren de koningin
- Raadsel van de Ringen
  - 2001: De verborgen poort
  - 2000: De stem in de grot
  - 1999: Talisman
- Een Daan en Doortje mysterie
  - 1994: Daan en Doortje en het monster van Loch Ness
  - 1994: Daan en Doortje en de poldergeesten
