= Interview (2007 film) =

2007 drama film

- Theatrical release poster
- Directed by: Steve Buscemi
- Written by: Steve Buscemi; David Schechter
- Produced by: Gijs van de Westelaken; Bruce Weiss
- Starring: Steve Buscemi; Sienna Miller; Danny Schechter; James Franco (voice)
- Cinematography: Thomas Kist
- Edited by: Kate Williams
- Music by: Evan Lurie
- Production companies: Column Productions; Ironworks Productions
- Distributed by: Sony Pictures Classics (United States); A-Film Distribution (Netherlands)
- Release date: July 13, 2007
- Running time: 86 minutes
- Countries: United States; Netherlands
- Language: English

Interview is a remake of Dutch film maker Theo van Gogh's 2003 film. The American version, which premiered in 2007, stars Steve Buscemi as Pierre Peders (originally played by Pierre Bokma), a fading political journalist interviewing a soap opera star, Katya, played by Sienna Miller (originally played by Katja Schuurman). This film also features Tara Elders as Maggie, Molly Griffith as a waitress, and Philippe Vonlanthen as an autograph seeker. Steve Buscemi is also a director of this American adaptation. Katja Schuurman, the actress who played Sienna Miller's part in the original movie, has a small cameo as a woman leaving a limo towards the end of the movie.

== Plot ==
Pierre Peders (Buscemi) is a tough political correspondent infuriated by his editor's insistence he cover a tabloid-level story about the paparazzi favorite Katya (Miller). Pierre's chagrin increases given the news of a searing White House scandal that is just breaking; instead of covering the piece, Peders must visit a posh Manhattan restaurant and interview Katya, whom he instantly detests. The one-on-one is more of a disaster than either could have predicted, but by some strange twist of fate, Pierre is injured and brought back to Katya's loft. Once there, liquor is downed, cocaine is consumed, minor violence erupts, and the two begin to "dance a pas de deux" — attempting, not so subtly, to outmaneuver one another psychologically, as dark secrets and long-hidden vulnerabilities emerge.

Katya teases Peders into kissing her, which Peders passionately does, but as her cell phone rings and reality reasserts itself, Katya demands that he stop. Peders is exasperated and complains that she doesn't let him finish what she starts, unlike the male prostitute he once visited. During another one of Katya's phone calls, Peders uses Katya's laptop and opens a folder containing what he believes is Katya's diary. He is able to barely conceal his surprise when Katya eyes him suspiciously, by saying he is merely Googling her, as per an earlier suggestion by her.

When Katya's attention returns to her phone call, Peders e-mails a particularly expressive and emotional diary passage to himself. Later, unable to forget what he had read, Peders betrays his snooping by asking Katya what has made her lose hope. After an emotional outburst about her loss of privacy, she admits that she has cancer. At this, Peders is immediately contrite about the way he has been treating her. He learns that no one knows about Katya's illness; she feels that saying it aloud will make it more "real". Peders promises not to reveal the truth about her health; Katya demands that Peders reveal something about himself in return.

As Katya films the confession with a camcorder, Peders admits that, as a reporter, he has made up stories and sources, and that he essentially caused his alcoholic former wife's death. (He took his time responding to her distress call to him - by the time he arrived, she was already dead.) Katya swaps out the camcorder tape when Peders is unaware, and a while later, Peders attempts to do the same. On a clandestine phone call to his editor, Peders - against his promise to Katya - tells him that Katya has cancer. Peders leaves Katya's loft, and as he is walking outside, she calls him on his cell phone.

Katya reveals that not only did she lie about having cancer, (the diary Peders believed was hers was actually the diary of the character she played) but she has Peders' confessional tape. She inquires whether she should send it to his editor first or the police. Peders smugly retorts that he swapped the tape first; Katya disagrees and says he only has her rehearsal tape. The movie ends with Peders and Katya watching their tapes - Peders wearing a sullen expression. Katya sips a glass of wine while watching Peders' confessional tape, but it is unknown if she will follow through with her threat.

== Cast ==
- Steve Buscemi as Pierre Peders
- Sienna Miller as Katya
- Danny Schechter as Maitre’D
- Michael Buscemi as Robert Peders
- Tara Elders as Maggie
- Molly Griffith as The Waitress
- Philippe Vonlanthen as Autographer Seeker
- Craig muMs Grant as Cab Driver
- James Franco as Boyfriend On Phone
- Katja Schuurman as Limo Lady

== Reception ==
On the review aggregator website Rotten Tomatoes, 58% of 126 critics' reviews are positive, with an average rating of 6/10. The website's consensus reads: "Captivating performances from Steve Buscemi and Sienna Miller make a seemingly simple premise gripping and entertaining."
