= Theo van Gogh (film director) =

Dutch film director (1957–2004)

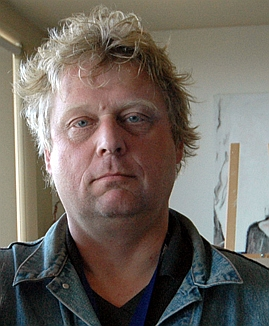
- Van Gogh in 2004
- Born: Theodoor van Gogh; 23 July 1957; The Hague, Netherlands
- Died: 2 November 2004 (aged 47); Amsterdam, Netherlands
- Cause of death: Murder (gunshots and stab wounds)
- Monuments: The Scream
- Years active: 1980–2004
- Notable work: Blind Date, Interview, Submission, 06/05
- Children: Lieuwe van Gogh
- Relatives: Vincent Willem van Gogh (grandfather); Theo van Gogh (great-grandfather); Vincent van Gogh (great-granduncle); Henk Vonhoff (uncle); Johan Witteveen (first cousin once removed); Willem Witteveen (second cousin)

Theodoor "Theo" van Gogh (Note: In this Dutch name, the surname is Van Gogh, not Gogh.) (Dutch: [ˈteːjoː vɑŋ ˈɣɔx]; (Note: Van in isolation is [vɑn].) 23 July 1957 – 2 November 2004) was a Dutch film director. He directed Submission: Part 1, a short film written by Somali writer and politician Ayaan Hirsi Ali, which criticised the treatment of women in Islam in strong terms. On 2 November 2004, he was murdered by Mohammed Bouyeri, a Dutch-Moroccan Islamist who objected to the film's message. The last film Van Gogh had completed before his murder, 06/05, was a fictional exploration of the assassination of Dutch politician Pim Fortuyn. It was released posthumously in December 2004, a month after Van Gogh's death, and two years after Fortuyn's death.

== Early life ==
Theodoor van Gogh was born on 23 July 1957 in The Hague to Anneke and Johan van Gogh. His father served in the Dutch secret service (AIVD, then called BVD). He was named after his paternal uncle Theo, who was captured and executed while working as a resistance fighter during the Nazi occupation of the Netherlands during World War II.

Theodoor was a great-grandson of Theo van Gogh, an art dealer who was the brother of painter Vincent van Gogh.

== Career ==
After dropping out of law school at the University of Amsterdam, Van Gogh became a stage manager. His self-proclaimed passion was filmmaking, and he made his debut as a director with the movie Luger (1981).

He was awarded a Gouden Kalf for Blind Date (1996) and In het belang van de staat ("In the Interest of the State", 1997). For the latter, he also received a "Certificate of Merit" from the San Francisco International Film Festival. As an actor, he appeared in the film, De noorderlingen ("The Northerners", 1992). He made numerous films (see below), many on political themes. From the 1990s, Van Gogh also worked in television.

His last book (2003) was Allah weet het beter ("Allah Knows Best"), in which he strongly condemned Islam. He was a well-known critic of Islam, particularly after the Iranian Revolution and the September 11 attacks. He supported the nomination of writer Ayaan Hirsi Ali for the Dutch parliament, who was elected. Born in Somalia, she had immigrated to the Netherlands to escape an arranged marriage. She became a writer and socialist (former PvdA Labour Party) politician.

In the 1980s, Van Gogh became a newspaper columnist. Through the years he used his columns to express his frustration with politicians, actors, film directors, writers and other people he considered to be part of "the establishment". He delighted in provocation and became a controversial figure, frequently criticising Islamic cultures. He used his website, De Gezonde Roker ("The Healthy Smoker"), to express harsh criticism of multicultural society. He said the Netherlands was so rife with social turmoil that it was in danger of turning into "something Belfast-like".

=== Submission ===
Working from a script written by Ayaan Hirsi Ali, Van Gogh created the 10-minute short film Submission. The movie deals with violence against women in Islamic societies; it tells the stories of four abused Muslim women. The title, Submission, is a translation of the word "Islam" into English. In the film, women's naked bodies, with texts from the Qur'an written on them in henna, in an allusion to traditional wedding rituals in some cultures, are veiled with semi-transparent shrouds as the women kneel in prayer, telling their stories as if they are speaking to Allah.

In August 2004, after the movie's broadcast on Dutch public TV, the newspaper De Volkskrant reported that the journalist Francisco van Jole had accused Hirsi Ali and Van Gogh of plagiarism, saying that they had appropriated the ideas of Iranian-American video artist Shirin Neshat, whose work used Arabic text projected onto bodies.

Following the broadcast, both Van Gogh and Hirsi Ali received death threats. Van Gogh did not take the threats seriously and refused any protection. According to Hirsi Ali, he said, "Nobody kills the village idiot", a term he frequently used about himself.

== Personal life ==
Van Gogh was a member of the Dutch Republican Society movement, which advocates the abolition of the monarchy of the Netherlands. He was a friend and supporter of the controversial Dutch politician Pim Fortuyn, who was assassinated in 2002.

== Murder ==
Murder of Theo van Gogh
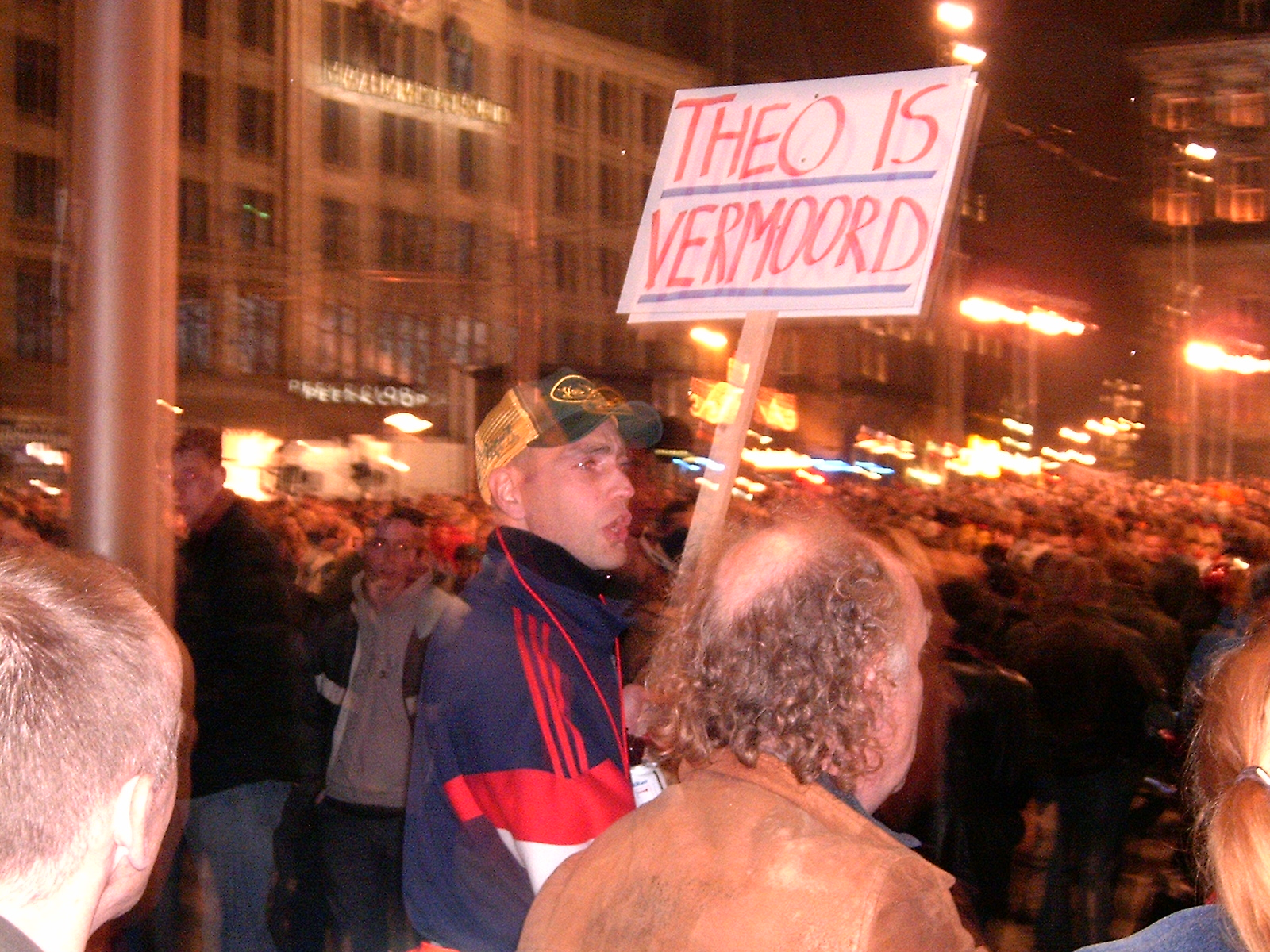
- Demonstrators. The sign, translated, says "Theo has been murdered".
- Location: 52°21′32.22″N 4°55′34.74″E; Amsterdam East
- Date: 2 November 2004; 9 am
- Target: Theo van Gogh
- Attack type: Murder by shooting and stabbing, assassination
- Weapon: HS2000 pistol
- Deaths: 1 (the target)
- Perpetrator: Mohammed Bouyeri
- Motive: To oppose the controversial film Submission

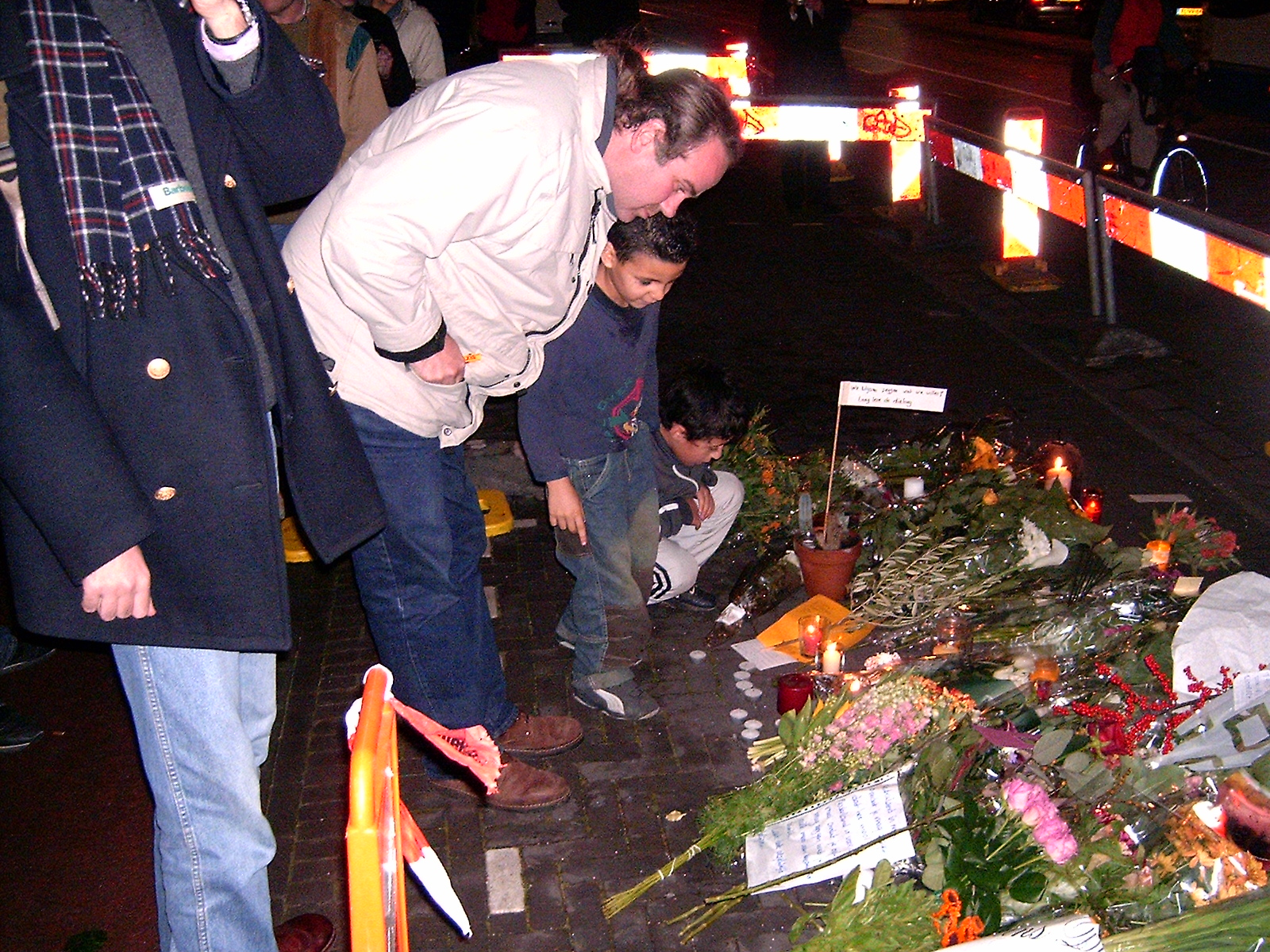
Place where Van Gogh was killed

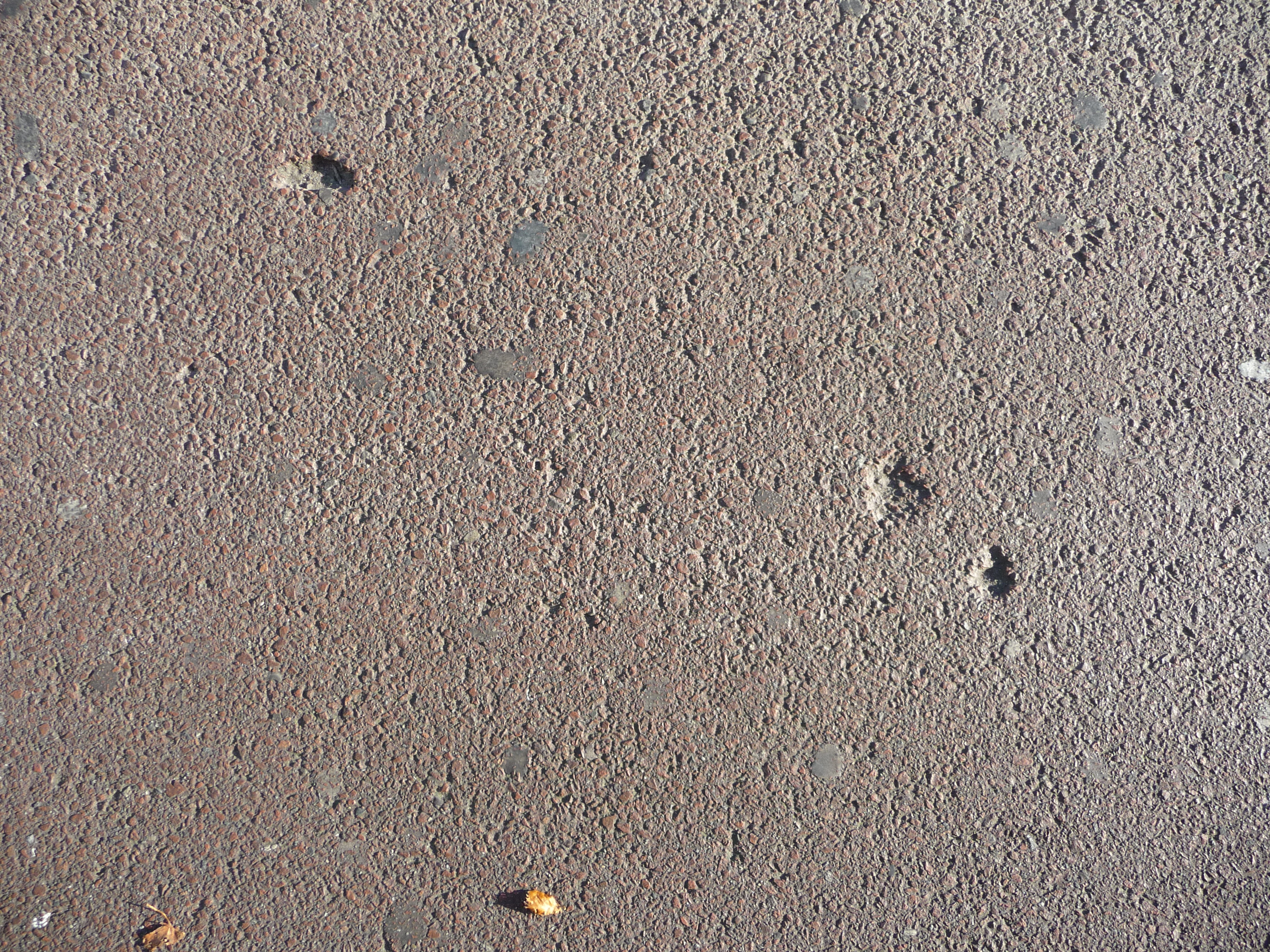
Ten years after the murder, the bullet holes were still visible in the bicycle lane in front of Linnaeusstraat 22 (2014).

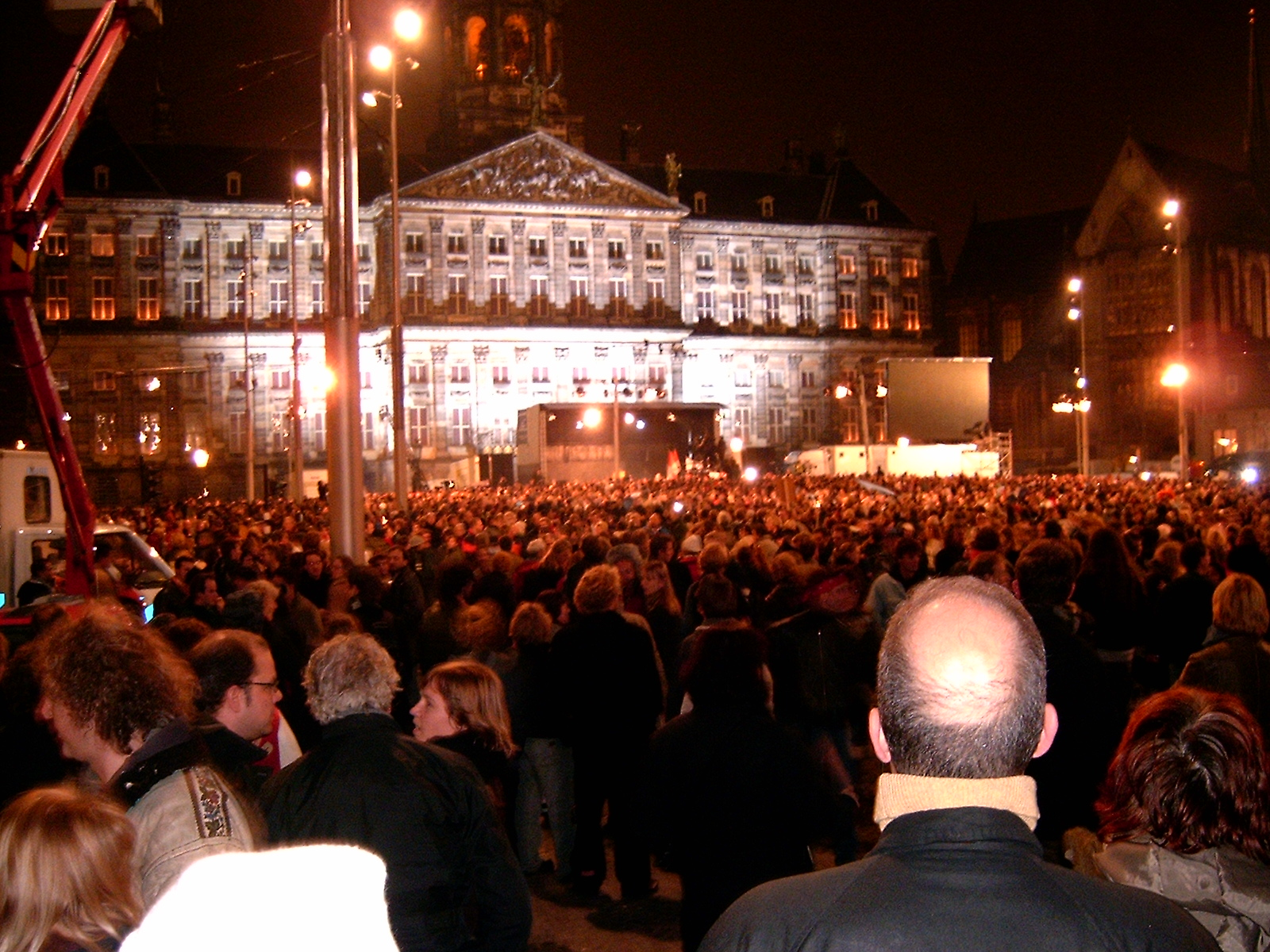
Demonstration at the Dam square after Van Gogh was killed

At approximately 9 a.m. on the morning of 2 November 2004, Van Gogh was shot several times and had his throat slit while cycling to work. The perpetrator, 26-year-old Dutch-Moroccan citizen Mohammed Bouyeri, also injured some bystanders and left a note pinned to Van Gogh's stomach with a knife containing death threats to Ayaan Hirsi Ali, who went into hiding. The note also threatened Western countries and Jews, and referred to ideologies of the Egyptian organisation Jama'at al-Muslimin.

Bouyeri was apprehended by police after a chase. Authorities alleged that he had terrorist ties with the Dutch Islamist Hofstad Network. He was charged with the attempted murder of several police officers and bystanders, illegal possession of a firearm, and conspiring to murder others, including Hirsi Ali. He was convicted at trial on 26 July 2005, and sentenced to life in prison with no chance of parole.

The murder sparked outrage and grief throughout the Netherlands. Flowers, notes, drawings and other expressions of mourning were left at the scene of the murder.

=== Funeral ===
The cremation ceremony took place on 9 November. Fearing he might not survive a planned flight to New York, Van Gogh had spoken about his funeral wishes with friends shortly before his death. Maarten van Rossem was asked by Van Gogh's relatives to speak, something he found difficult in that he wanted to avoid sounding apocalyptic. Van Gogh's father suggested that his son would have liked the media attention provoked by his murder.

=== Aftermath ===
The day after the murder, Dutch police arrested eight people allegedly belonging to a group later referred to as the Hofstad Network. Six detainees were Dutch-Moroccans, one was Dutch-Algerian, and one had dual Spanish-Moroccan nationality. The Dutch Complaints Bureau for Discrimination on the Internet (MDI) received many complaints about websites allegedly praising the murder and making death threats against other people.

At the same time, starting with four attempted arson attacks on mosques in the weekend of 5–7 November, there were retaliatory violent incidents against Muslims, including a bomb that exploded at a Muslim school in Eindhoven. The Dutch Monitoring Centre on Racism and Xenophobia recorded a total of 106 violent incidents in November against Muslim targets. The National Dutch Police Services Agency (KLPD) recorded 31 occasions of violence against mosques and Islamic schools between 23 November, and 13 March 2005. An arson attack destroyed a Muslim primary school in Uden in December 2004. By 8 November, Christian churches were reported as targets of vandalism and arson attacks in turn. A report for the Anne Frank Foundation and the University of Leiden, accounted for a total of 174 violent incidents between 2–30 November; it said that mosques were the target of violence 47 times, and churches 13 times.

The murder widened and polarised the debate in the Netherlands about the social position of its more than one million Muslim residents. It also put the country's liberal tradition further into question, coming only two years after Pim Fortuyn's murder. In an apparent reaction against controversial statements about the Islamic, Christian, and Jewish religions—such as those Van Gogh had made—the Dutch Minister of Justice, Christian Democrat Piet Hein Donner, suggested Dutch blasphemy laws should either be applied more stringently or made more strict. The liberal D66 party suggested scrapping the blasphemy laws altogether.

Geert Wilders, at the time an independent member of the House of Representatives, advocated a five-year halt to immigration from non-Western societies, saying: "The Netherlands has been too tolerant to intolerant people for too long. We should not import a retarded political Islamic society into our country".

Wilders and Ayaan Hirsi Ali went into hiding for several weeks. Wilders has been under the protection of bodyguards ever since, and Hirsi Ali eventually relocated to the United States.

Theo's son Lieuwe van Gogh claims he has been attacked on several occasions by young people of Moroccan and Turkish descent, and that the police did not provide him with help or protection. The police denied receiving any report of attacks.

== Legacy and honours ==
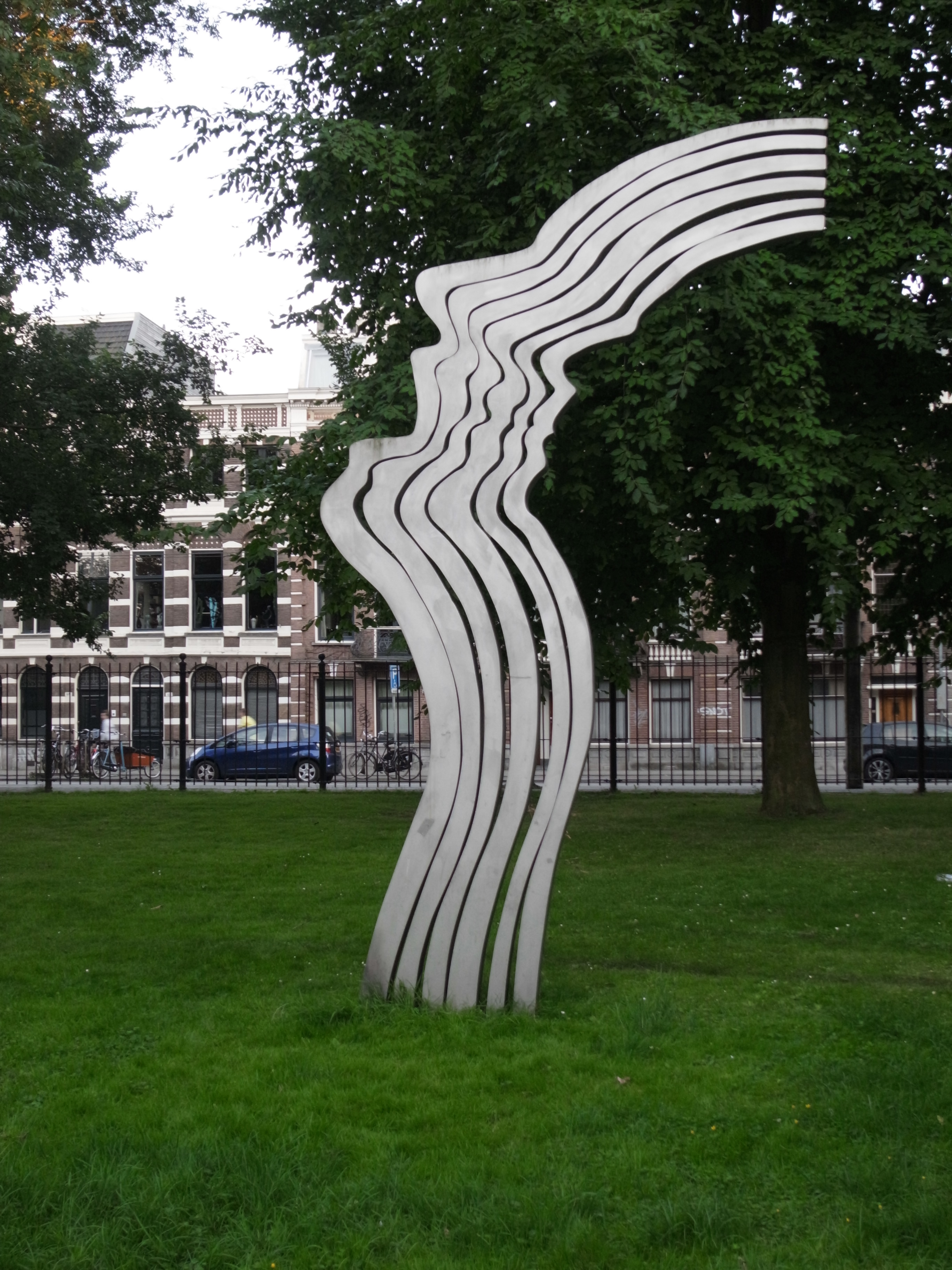
De Schreeuw (The Scream) is a memorial for Theo van Gogh and a symbol of the freedom of speech.

On 18 March 2007, a sculpture honouring Theo van Gogh, entitled De Schreeuw ("The Scream"), was unveiled in Amsterdam. It is located in the Oosterpark, a short distance from where Van Gogh was murdered. A private trust, the Foundation for Freedom of Expression, was established to help fund protection for critics of Islam and Muslims.

=== Reactions ===
In the English-speaking world, controversy arose after Rohan Jayasekera's article on Van Gogh was published in Index on Censorship. The Associate Editor of the magazine said that Van Gogh was a "free-speech fundamentalist" who had been on a "martyrdom operation[,] roar[ing] his Muslim critics into silence with obscenities" in an "abuse of his right to free speech". Describing Van Gogh's film Submission as "furiously provocative", Jayasekera said his death was:

A sensational climax to a lifetime's public performance, stabbed and shot by a bearded fundamentalist, a message from the killer pinned by a dagger to his chest, Theo van Gogh became a martyr to free expression. His passing was marked by a magnificent barrage of noise as Amsterdam hit the streets to celebrate him in the way the man himself would have truly appreciated. And what timing! Just as his long-awaited biographical film of Pim Fortuyn's life is ready to screen. Bravo, Theo! Bravo!

Both left- and right-wing commentators criticised the article. In December 2004, Nick Cohen of The Observer wrote:

When I asked Jayasekera if he had any regrets, he said he had none. He told me that, like many other readers, I shouldn't have made the mistake of believing that Index on Censorship was against censorship, even murderous censorship, on principle—in the same way as Amnesty International is opposed to torture, including murderous torture, on principle. It may have been so in its radical youth, but was now as concerned with fighting 'hate speech' as protecting free speech.

Cohen's account of the conversation was repudiated by the editor of the Index on Censorship, who responded with a letter to The Observer.

== Works ==
=== Books ===
- Engel ("Angel", 1990)
- Er gebeurt nooit iets ("Nothing Ever Happens", 1993)
- Sla ik mijn vrouw wel hard genoeg? ("Am I Beating My Wife Hard Enough?", 1996)
- De gezonde roker ("The Healthy Smoker", 2000)
- Allah weet het beter ("Allah Knows Best", 2003)
- De tranen van Mabel ("Mabel's Tears", with Tomas Ross, 2004)

=== Filmography ===
- Luger (1982)
- Een dagje naar het strand ("A Day at the Beach", 1984)
- Charley (1986)
- Terug naar Oegstgeest ("Back to Oegstgeest", 1987)
- Loos ("Wild", 1989)
- Vals licht ("False Light", 1993)
- Ilse verandert de geschiedenis ("Ilse Changes History", 1993)
- 1-900 (1994)
- Reunie ("Reunion", 1994)
- Eva (1994)
- Een galerij: De wanhoop van de sirene ("A Gallery: The Siren's Despair", 1994)
- De eenzame oorlog van Koos Tak ("Koos Tak's Lonely War", 1995)
- Blind Date (1996)
- Hoe ik mijn moeder vermoordde ("How I Murdered My Mother", 1996)
- In het belang van de staat ("In the Interest of the State", 1997)
- Au ("Ouch", 1997)
- De Pijnbank ("The Rack", 1998)
- Baby Blue (2001)
- De nacht van Aalbers ("Aalbers's Night", 2001)
- Najib en Julia (2002). A television play based on William Shakespeare's Romeo and Juliet, in which a white upper-class girl has an affair with a young pizza delivery man of Moroccan descent.
- Interview (2003), a film in which a cynical journalist interviews an actress-cum-socialite.
- Zien ("Seeing", 2004)
- "Submission: Part 1" (2004). The first of a planned series.
- Cool (2004), a film about young offenders, some of Moroccan descent, who play themselves.
- 06/05 (2004). A fact-based drama about the assassination of Pim Fortuyn.
- Medea (2005). An adaptation of Medea.

==== Unfinished projects ====
- Bad (A "lesbian road movie"). Production was planned for 2005
- Duizend en één dag ("A Thousand and One Days"). A drama series about young Muslims struggling with their faith. Although this project had not even reached pre-production, Van Gogh had already found a broadcaster for the series: Dutch Muslim Broadcasting Organisation NMO.

== Ancestry ==
Ancestors of Theo van Gogh (film director)

8. Theo van Gogh (1857–1891)
4. Vincent Willem van Gogh (1890–1978)
9. Johanna Bonger (1862–1925)
2. Johan van Gogh (1922–2009)
10. Floor Wibaut (1859–1936)
5. Josina Wibaut (1890–1933)
11. Mathilde Berdenis van Berlekom (1862–1952)
1. Theo van Gogh (1957–2004)
3. Anneke Vonhoff (born 1936)

== See also ==
- Censorship by religion
- Dove World Outreach Center Quran-burning controversy
- Innocence of Muslims (2012 film)
- Jyllands-Posten Muhammad cartoons controversy
- Multiculturalism in the Netherlands
- Religious intolerance
- Richard Webster
- The Satanic Verses by Salman Rushdie (1988 book)
- The Stoning of Soraya M. (2008 film)
- Lars Vilks
- Kurt Westergaard

== Notes and references ==
1. Theovangogh.com
2. Muslims in the European Union: Discrimination and Islamophobia, p. 78 (European Monitoring Centre on Racism and Xenophobia)
3. Golf van aanslagen sinds dood Van Gogh (Brabants Dagblad)
4. Muslims in the European Union: Discrimination and Islamophobia, pp. 78–79
5. Muslims in the EU: Cities Report, The Netherlands. Preliminary research report and literature survey, p. 7 (Open Society Institute – EU Monitoring and Advocacy Program)
6. Ontwikkelingen na de moord op van Gogh, p. 3 (Anne Frank Stichting; Universiteit Leiden)
7. "Free speech fundamentalist on a martyrdom operation". Archived from the original on 1 September 2007. (originally from Index on Censorship)
8. Censor and sensibility (The Guardian)
9. Letters to the Editor – Free to Speak (The Guardian)
