= List of Dutch films of the 2020s =

This is a list of films produced in the Netherlands during the 2020s.

== 2020 ==
Title	Director	Cast	Category	Notes
Men at Work: Miami	Johan Nijenhuis	Jim Bakkum; Martijn Fischer; Juvat Westendorp	Comedy	30 January 2020
De Grote Slijmfilm	Hans Somers	Kate Bensdorp; Bibi; Edson da Graça	Adventure	5 February 2020
The Marriage Escape	Johan Nijenhuis	Herman Finkers; Johanna ter Steege; Leonie ter Braak	Comedy, drama	13 February 2020
Pirates Down the Street	Pim van Hoeve	Egbert-Jan Weeber; Tygo Gernandt; Sarah Janneh	Family	1 July 2020
Life as It Should Be	Ruud Schuurman	Barbara Sloesen; Jan Kooijman; Sanne Langelaar	Comedy, drama	6 August 2020
Paradise Drifters	Mees Peijnenburg	Tamar van Waning; Jonas Smulders; Bilal Wahib	Drama	3 September 2020
Casanova's	Jamel Aattache	Tygo Gernandt; Jim Bakkum; Roeland Fernhout	Comedy	5 October 2020
De Grote Sinterklaasfilm	Lucio Messercola	Bram van der Vlugt; Joshua Albano; Filip Bolluyt	Family	7 October 2020
Hidden in the Spotlight	Jelle Nesna	Abbey Hoes; Georgina Verbaan; Eelco Smits	Drama	22 October 2020
Bon Bini: Judeska in da House	Jonathan Herman	Jandino Asporaat; Arjan Ederveen	Comedy	10 December 2020

== 2021 ==
Title	Director	Cast	Category	Notes
The Expedition of the Family Fox	Bob Wilbers	Levi Otto; Raymonde de Kuyper; Anna Drijver	Family	11 February 2021
Just Say Yes	Appie Boudellah; Aram van de Rest	Yolanthe Cabau; Huub Smit; Jim Bakkum	Comedy	2 April 2021
De Oost	Jim Taihuttu	Martijn Lakemeier; Marwan Kenzari	Drama, war	13 May 2021
The Forgotten Battle	Matthijs van Heijningen Jr.	Gijs Blom; Jamie Flatters; Susan Radder	Drama, war	5 June 2021
I Don't Wanna Dance	Flynn Von Kleist	Yfendo van Praag; Romana Vrede	Drama	10 June 2021
De Nog Grotere Slijmfilm	Martijn Smits	Bibi; Edson da Graça	Adventure	7 July 2021
My Best Friend Anne Frank	Ben Sombogaart	Aiko Beemsterboer; Josephine Arendsen; Björn Freiberg	Drama	9 September 2021
My Father Is an Airplane	Antoinette Beumer	Elise Schaap; Pierre Bokma; Maarten Heijmans	Drama	30 September 2021
Nr. 10	Alex van Warmerdam	Tom Dewispelaere; Frieda Barnhard	Thriller	30 September 2021
De Grote Sinterklaasfilm: Trammelant in Spanje	Lucio Messercola	Robert ten Brink; Pamela Teves; Filip Bolluyt	Family	6 October 2021
ANNE+	Valerie Bisscheroux	Hanna van Vliet; Jouman Fattal; Thorn de Vries	Drama	14 October 2021
Liefde Zonder Grenzen	Appie Boudellah; Aram van de Rest	Jim Bakkum; Yolanthe Cabau; Freek Bartels	Comedy	14 October 2021
Do Not Hesitate	Shariff Korver	Joes Brauers; Spencer Bogaert	Thriller	11 November 2021
Captain Nova	Maurice Trouwborst	Kika van de Vijver; Anniek Pheifer	Family	1 December 2021

== 2022 ==
Title	Director	Cast	Category	Notes
Ik Wist Het	Jamel Aattache	Sigrid ten Napel; Steef de Bot; Tarikh Janssen	Comedy, romance	17 February 2022
Met Mes	Sam de Jong	Hadewych Minis; Gijs Naber; Shahine El-Hamus	Drama	14 April 2022
Pirates Down the Street 2	Pim van Hoeve	Nyncke Beekhuyzen; Tygo Gernandt; Jung Sun den Hollander	Family	20 April 2022
Costa!!	Jon Karthaus	Katja Schuurman; Abbey Hoes; Stephanie van Eer	Comedy, drama	28 April 2022
Foodies	Mannin de Wildt	Sanne Vogel; Holly Mae Brood; Sanne Langelaar	Comedy, romance	12 May 2022
Moloch	Nico van den Brink	Sallie Harmsen; Anneke Blok; Alexandre Willaume	Horror	19 May 2022
F*ck Love Too	Appie Boudellah; Aram van de Rest	Bo Maerten; Geza Weisz; Yolanthe Cabau	Comedy, romance	20 May 2022
Marokkaanse Bruiloft	Johan Nijenhuis	Soumaya Ahouaoui; Ali Fardi; Nora El Koussour	Comedy, romance	2 June 2022
Nayola	José Miguel Ribeiro	Elisângela Rita; Feliciana Délcia Guia; Vitória Adelino Dias Soares	Drama	13 June 2022
Silverstar	Diede in 't Veld	Juvat Westendorp; Britt Dekker; Anneke Blok	Adventure	29 June 2022
Bon Bini Holland 3	Pieter van Rijn	Tygo Gernandt; Rico Verhoeven; Jandino Asporaat	Comedy	30 June 2022
De Allergrootste Slijmfilm	Martijn Smits	Bibi; Yolanthe Cabau; Ferdi Stofmeel	Adventure	6 July 2022
Zwanger & Co	Johan Nijenhuis	Lieke van Lexmond; Waldemar Torenstra; Beppie Melissen	Romance	7 July 2022
Boeien!	Bob Wilbers	Cees Geel; Ferdi Stofmeel; Sarah Chronis	Family	20 July 2022
De Bellinga's: Huis op stelten	Armando de Boer	De Bellinga's	Family	3 August 2022
Hart op de juiste plek	Bob Wilbers	Jan Versteegh; Jasper Demollin; Irene Moors	Comedy, romance	18 August 2022
Soof 3	Anne de Clercq	Lies Visschedijk; Fedja van Huêt	Comedy	15 September 2022
De Grote Sinterklaasfilm: Gespuis in de Speelgoedkluis	Lucio Messercola	Robert ten Brink; Jan Versteegh; Richard Groenendijk	Family	5 October 2022
Zee van Tijd	Theu Boermans	Reinout Scholten van Aschat; Gijs Scholten van Aschat; Sallie Harmsen	Drama	13 October 2022
De Club van Sinterklaas en de Race Tegen de Klok	Martijn Koevoets	Wilbert Gieske; Beryl van Praag; Anouk de Pater	Family	14 October 2022
Kwestie van geduld	Ruud Schuurman	Barbara Sloesen; Manuel Broekman; Bianca Krijgsman	Comedy, romance	20 October 2022
Narcosis	Martijn de Jong	Thekla Reuten; Fedja van Huêt	Drama	22 October 2022
Stromboli	Michiel van Erp	Elise Schaap; Tim McInnerny; Pieter Embrechts	Drama	3 November 2022
Casa Coco	Bob Wilbers	Gerard Cox; Joke Bruijs	Comedy	10 November 2022
Piece of My Heart	Dana Nechushtan	Elaine Meijerink; Roos Englebert	Drama	1 December 2022
Hotel Sinestra	Michiel ten Horn	Elise Schaap; Jeroen Spitzenberger; Bobbie Mulder	Family	14 December 2022
Het Feest van Tante Rita	Dennis Bots	Edsilia Rombley; Ridder van Kooten; Tooske Ragas	Family	21 December 2022
De Tatta's	Jamel Aattache	Leo Alkemade; Leonie ter Braak; Oussama Ahammoud	Comedy	22 December 2022
Faithfully Yours	André van Duren	Bracha van Doesburgh; Elise Schaap	Thriller	22 December 2022

== 2023 ==
Title	Director	Cast	Category	Notes
Fijn weekend	Jon Karthaus	Steef de Bot; Lisa Zweerman; Kay Greidanus	Romance	19 January 2023
Klem	Frank Ketelaar	Barry Atsma; Jacob Derwig; Georgina Verbaan	Drama	2 February 2023
Broken	Ben Verbong	Noortje Herlaar; Egbert-Jan Weeber	Drama	2 March 2023
Polder	Bob Wilbers	Jochum ten Haaf; Harm Duco Schut; Fien Lindenhovius	Thriller	9 March 2023
All Inclusive	Aniëlle Webster	Jennifer Hoffman; Frank Lammers; Aiko Beemsterboer	Comedy	16 March 2023
Grenzeloos Verraad	Thomas Nauw; Dennis Bots	Peter Nillesen; Berit van de Wouw; Kai Kolder; Andreas Lessig	War	6 April 2023
Leeuwin	Raymond Grimbergen	Alyssa van Ommeren; Jay Karim-Jonker; Sanguita Akkrum	Family	19 April 2023
Zomer in Frankrijk	Mark de Cloe	Jan Kooijman; Fockeline Ouwerkerk	Romance	27 April 2023
De Oneindige Slijmfilm	Martijn Smits	Bibi; Denise Aznam; Aaron Bezemer	Family	5 July 2023
Kiddo	Zara Dwinger	Rosa van Leeuwen; Frieda Barnhard	Drama, Road Movie	5 July 2023
Candy & Bonita	Nienke Römer	Sanne Langelaar; Fockeline Ouwerkerk	Comedy	6 July 2023
De Bellinga's: Vakantie op stelten	Armando de Boer	De Bellinga's	Family	12 July 2023
Only You	Jonathan Elbers	Claire Bender; Egbert-Jan Weeber	Drama, romance	10 August 2023
De Vuurlinie	Roel Reiné	Waldemar Torenstra; Sallie Harmsen; Jeroen Spitzenberger	Drama, war	14 September 2023
Happy Single	Anna van Keimpema	Juvat Westendorp; Jamie Grant	Comedy, romance	21 September 2023
Toen we van de Duitsers verloren	Guido van Driel; Lennert Hillege	Kylian de Pagter; Rein Hoeke	Drama	21 September 2023
Sweet Dreams	Ena Sendijarević	Peter Faber; Renée Soutendijk; Lisa Zweerman	Drama	28 September 2023
Sint Ahoy!	Andy van Veen; Rik Sinkeldam	Fred Butter; Liza Sips; Donny Ronny	Family	4 October 2023
De Grote Sinterklaasfilm en de Strijd om Pakjesavond	Lucio Messercola	Robert ten Brink; Martien Meiland; Eva Jinek	Family	4 October 2023
Net als in de film	Albert Jan van Rees; Dorien Goertzen	Noortje Herlaar; Benja Bruijning; Kay Greidanus	Musical	12 October 2023
Zomervacht	Joren Molter	Micha Hulshof; Joël in 't Veld; Jarne Heylen	Drama	19 October 2023
Alles is nog steeds zoals het zou moeten zijn	Erwin van den Eshof	Barbara Sloesen; Walid Benmbarek; Sanne Langelaar	Comedy, drama	9 November 2023
Hardcore Never Dies	Jim Taihuttu	Joes Brauers; Jim Deddes; Rosa Stil	Drama	9 November 2023
Rocco & Sjuul	Anna van der Heide	Beppie Melissen; Sabri Saad El Hamus	Comedy, drama	16 November 2023
Jippie No More!	Margien Rogaar	Wesley van Klink; Guido Pollemans; Hannah van Lunteren	Family	13 December 2023
De Tatta's 2	Jamel Aattache	Leo Alkemade; Leonie ter Braak; Oussama Ahammoud	Comedy	14 December 2023
Juf Braaksel en de magische ring	Aram van de Rest	Nicolette van Dam; Djamila; Kraantje Pappie	Family	20 December 2023
Bon Bini: Bangkok Nights	Pieter van Rijn	Jandino Asporaat; Phi Nguyen	Comedy	20 December 2023
Neem Me Mee	Will Koopman	Jeroen Krabbé; Renée Soutendijk; Olga Zuiderhoek	Comedy, drama	21 December 2023

== 2024 ==
Title	Director	Cast	Category	Notes
Scotoe	Jamel Aattache; Mohamed Chaara; Sinan Eroglu	Mohamed Chaara; Sinan Eroglu	Comedy	1 February 2024
Hearts of Bali	Johan Nijenhuis	Anouk Maas; Tara Hetharia; Nadja Hüpscher	Comedy, romance	1 February 2024
De legende van de familie Vos	Bob Wilbers	Levi Otto; Edo Brunner; Buddy Vedder	Family	7 February 2024
Game On	Roy Poortmans	Marouane Meftah; Gio Latooy; Britt Scholte	Action, comedy	7 February 2024
Buenas Chicas	Pim van Hoeve	Noël van Kleef; Susan Radder; Britt Scholte	Comedy	7 March 2024
Memory Lane	Jelle de Jonge	Martin van Waardenberg; Leny Breederveld	Comedy, drama	21 March 2024
Invasie	Bobby Boermans	Gijs Scholten van Aschat; Fedja van Huêt; Gijs Blom	Action	11 April 2024
Yamas!	Andy van Veen; Rik Sinkeldam	Sam Kroon; André Dongelmans; Donny Ronny	Comedy	18 April 2024
Bed & Breakfast	Ruud Schuurman	Sanne Langelaar; Mingus Dagelet; Oscar Aerts	Comedy, romance	2 May 2024
Laatste ronde	Boris Paval Conen	Wilfried de Jong; Leopold Witte; Wim Opbrouck	Drama	16 May 2024
De Mooiste Dag	Appie Boudellah	Katja Schuurman; Isa Hoes; Edwin Jonker	Drama	13 June 2024
Drie dagen vis	Peter Hoogendoorn	Ton Kas; Guido Pollemans	Road movie	29 June 2024
Superkrachten voor je hoofd	Dylan Haegens	Elise Schaap; Jeroen Spitzenberger; Bas Hoeflaak	Family	10 July 2024
De Bellinga's: Pretpark op stelten	Armando de Boer	De Bellinga's	Family	10 July 2024
Expeditie Cupido	Erwin van den Eshof	Leo Alkemade; Carré Albers; Ilse Warringa	Comedy, romance	17 July 2024
Loverboy: Emoties Uit	Cyriel Guds	Mewan Abdulla; Gökhan Aktepe; Mohammed Azaay	Crime	29 August 2024
De Jacht op Meral Ö	Stijn Bouma	Gijs Naber; Dilan Yurdakul	Drama	5 September 2024
De Break-Up Club	Jonathan Elbers	Juvat Westendorp; Holly Mae Brood; Birgit Schuurman	Comedy, romance	12 September 2024
Dit is geen kerstfilm	Michael Middelkoop	Jacqueline Blom; Oscar Aerts; Cheryl Ashruf	Comedy	21 September 2024
Torch Song	Jeroen Houben	Carla Juri; Markoesa Hamer; Al Weaver	Drama	21 September 2024
Paradijs	Bobbie Koek	Zeb Claessen; Ellen ten Damme	Drama	25 September 2024
De Grote Sinterklaasfilm: Stampij in de bakkerij	Lucio Messercola	Robert ten Brink; Chris Tates; Martien Meiland	Family	2 October 2024
De Club van Sinterklaas film: Het Grote Sneeuwavontuur	Martijn Koevoets	Lucas Reijnders; Anouk de Pater; Britt Scholte	Family	3 October 2024
Rokjesnacht	Johan Nijenhuis	Abbey Hoes; Leo Alkemade; Brigitte Heitzer	Comedy, romance	3 October 2024
De Mannenmaker	Jamel Aattache	Katja Schuurman; Leo Alkemade	Comedy, romance	17 October 2024
Victor Vleermuis	Patrick Raats; Sarah Sutter	Soy Kroon; Stephanie van Eer; Fedja van Huêt	Animation	20 October 2024
De Z van Zus	Jelle de Jonge	Bracha van Doesburgh; Elise Schaap	Drama	7 November 2024
Tegendraads	Ben Sombogaart	Emma Josten; Mehdi Meskar; Holly Mae Brood	Drama	14 November 2024
Juf Braaksel en de geniale ontsnapping	Aram van de Rest	Victoria Koblenko; Nicolette van Dam; Juvat Westendorp	Family	11 December 2024
Schitterend	Maurice Trouwborst	Holly Mae Brood; Lies Visschedijk; Hannah Hoekstra	Comedy, drama	12 December 2024
Witte flits	Laura Hermanides			?

== 2025 ==
Title	Director	Cast	Category	Notes
Alpha.	Jan-Willem van Ewijk	Gijs Scholten van Aschat; Reinout Scholten van Aschat		
Amsterdamned II	Dick Maas	Huub Stapel; Holly Mae Brood		4 December 2025
The Blue Trail	Gabriel Mascaro	Denise Weinberg, Rodrigo Santoro	Science fiction, fantasy film	It had its world premiere in February 2025, as part of the 75th Berlin International Film Festival, in Competition.
De Grote Sinterklaasfilm en de verdwenen verlanglijstjes	Lucio Messercola	Robert ten Brink	Family	1 October 2025
De Tatta's 3	Jamel Aattache	Leo Alkemade; Sterre Koning; Laura van Kampen	Comedy	11 December 2025
Dochters	Johan Nijenhuis	Sanne Vogel; Barbara Sloesen; Abbey Hoes	Comedy	8 May 2025
Fabula	Michiel ten Horn	Fedja van Huêt; Sezgin Gülec; Anniek Pheifer	Crime comedy	30 January 2025
Ik zal zien	Mercedes Stalenhoef	Aiko Beemsterboer; Minne Koole	Drama	2 February 2025
Julian	Cato Kusters	Nina Meurisse, Laurence Roothooft	Drama	11 December 2025
Lekker met de Meiden	Anna van Keimpema	Stefanie van Leersum; Imanuelle Grives; Lisa Loeb	Comedy	5 June 2025
Love Fail Repeat	Erwin van den Eshof	Carré Albers; Twan Kuyper	Romance	20 February 2025
Mr. K	Tallulah H. Schwab	Crispin Glover; Sunnyi Melles; Fionnula Flanagan	Drama	16 January 2025
Men at Work 3	Aram van de Rest	Thijs Boermans; Rein van Duivenboden; Denzel Slager	Romance, comedy	16 October 2025
Perfectly Imperfect	Appie Boudellah	Yolanthe Cabau; Nicolette van Dam; Renée Fokker	Romance, drama	27 October 2025
Reedland	Sven Bresser	Gerrit Knobbe; Loïs Reinders; Anna Loeffen; Lola van Zoggel; Yannick Zoet	Drama	9 October 2025
Straatcoaches vs Aliens	Michael Middelkoop	Daniël Kolf; Shahine El-Hamus; Sinem Kavus	Comedy	13 February 2025
Vleesdag	Martijn Smits	Caro Derkx; Chardonnay Rillen; Emma Josten	Horror	25 September 2025
Wraak	Jonathan Elbers	Noortje Herlaar; Hamza Othman; Waldemar Torenstra	Crime	4 September 2025
Close Your Eyes Hind	Amir Zaza	Patel Akkad, Sundus Al Bashash, Mohamad Akkad	Biography, War drama	6 November 2025

== 2026 ==
Title	Director	Cast	Category	Notes
BOOMERS	Theu Boermans	Huub Stapel; Johanna ter Steege; Renée Fokker	Comedy	19 February 2026
Champagne	Tim Kamps	Leo Alkemade; Huub Stapel; Beppie Melissen	Drama	19 March 2026
De Tatta's: Daan	Jamel Aattache; Lars Zijm	Sem van der Horst; John Buijsman; Leo Alkemade	Comedy	8 October 2026
Juf Braaksel en het Meesterbrein	David Cocheret	Nicolette van Dam; Djamila; Juvat Westendorp	Family	9 December 2026
Love in Paradise	Johan Nijenhuis	Isa Hoes; Fedja Louman; Ghislaine van IJperen	Comedy, romance	29 January 2026

== 2027 ==
Title	Director	Cast	Category	Notes
Nooit te oud	Mark de Cloe	Leopold Witte; Daniël Boissevain; Kees Hulst	Comedy	14 January 2027

== Unknown ==
Title	Director	Cast	Category	Notes
Pijn	Guido Coppis	Reinout Scholten van Aschat; Frieda Barnard		?
SLEEP.	Jan-Willem Ewijk			?
