= Tina de Bruin =

Dutch actress (born 1975)

- Born: 24 November 1975 (age 50); Tolkamer, Netherlands
- Occupation: Actress

Tina de Bruin (born 24 November 1975) is a Dutch actress. She played a role in several films, including Gooische Vrouwen (2011), Liefde Zonder Grenzen (2021) and Costa!! (2022). She also appeared in two seasons of the television show Wie is de Mol?.

== Career ==
In 2011, De Bruin appeared in the film Gooische Vrouwen and in 2014, she appeared in the film Toen was geluk heel gewoon which is based on the television series with the same name. In 2020, she replaced Chantal Janzen in the second season of the television series Kees & Co as Janzen could no longer fit the series in her schedule.

In 2020, De Bruin participated in the 20th season of the popular television show Wie is de Mol? in which contestants are tasked to find which contestant among them is playing the role of the mole. In the same year, she also appeared in a special anniversary edition of the show, called Wie is de Mol? Renaissance, which featured only contestants of previous seasons. In both seasons she did not play the role of the mole.

De Bruin also appeared in the 2020 children's film De Grote Slijmfilm and its 2021 sequel De Nog Grotere Slijmfilm. In 2022, she played a role in the film Costa!!. She also appears in the musical comedy Volkstuin Complex.

In 2022, De Bruin appeared in the photography game show Het Perfecte Plaatje in which contestants compete to create the best photo in various challenges. In 2023, she appeared in The Masked Singer.

== Personal life ==
De Bruin is in a relationship with actor Vincent Croiset and in February 2017 she gave birth to a son. They both played a role in the 2015 television series Gouden Bergen. They married in April 2026.

== Selected filmography ==
=== As actress ===
- 2011: Gooische Vrouwen
- 2014: Toen was geluk heel gewoon
- 2020: Kees & Co
- 2020: De Grote Slijmfilm
- 2021: De Nog Grotere Slijmfilm
- 2021: Liefde Zonder Grenzen
- 2022: Costa!!
- 2023: De Bellinga's: Vakantie op stelten

=== As contestant ===
- 2020: Wie is de Mol?
- 2020: Wie is de Mol? Renaissance (anniversary season)
- 2022: Het Perfecte Plaatje
- 2023: The Masked Singer
