= Jeroen Spitzenberger =

Dutch actor (born 1976)

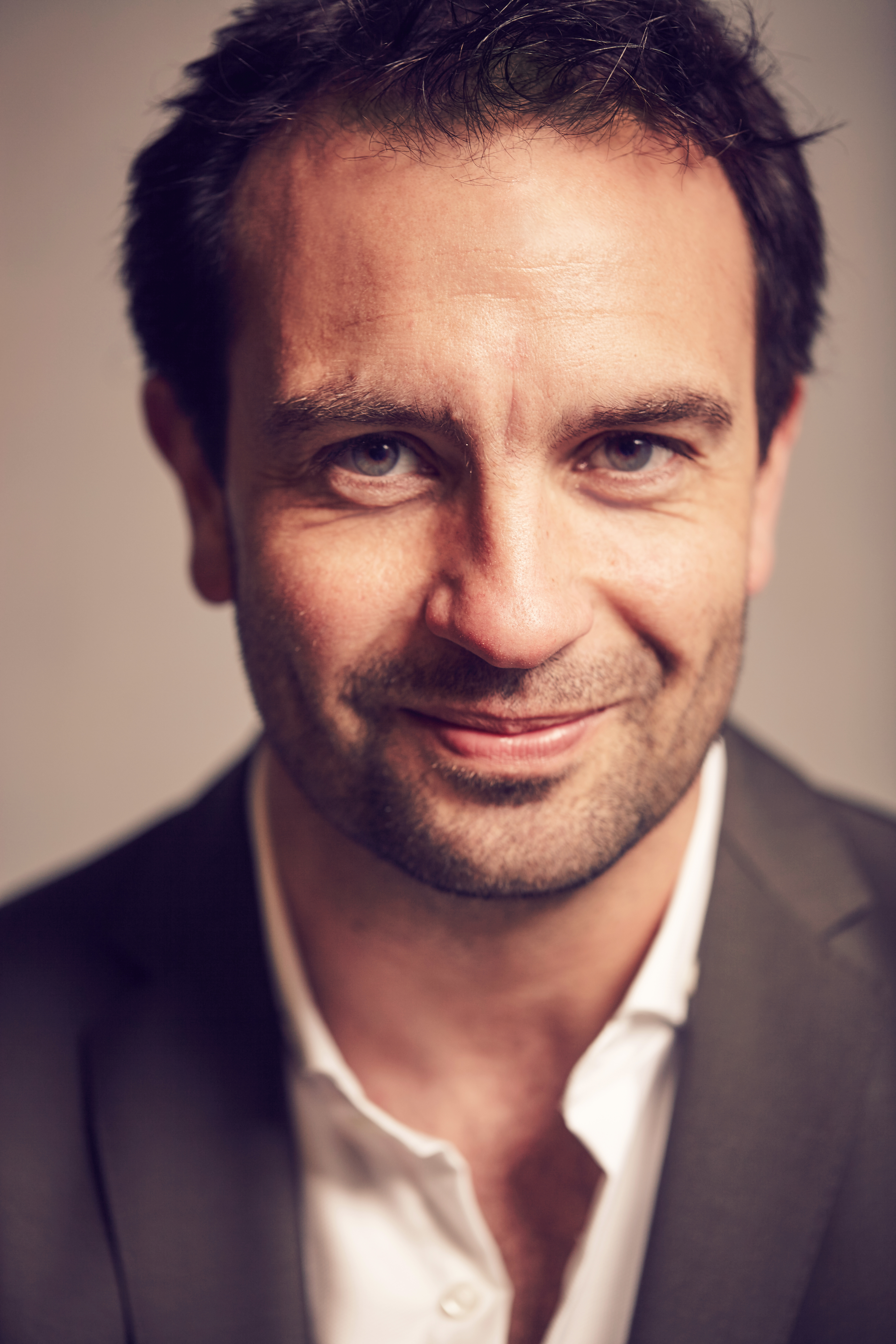
- Jeroen Spitzenberger
- Born: 20 January 1976 (age 50); Rotterdam, Netherlands
- Occupation: Actor
- Years active: 1992-present

Jeroen Spitzenberger (born 20 January 1976) is a Dutch actor. He has appeared in more than forty films since 1992.

== Filmography ==
Year	Title	Role	Notes
2002	De Tweeling	David	
2004	The Preacher	Ronald Jan	
2004	Stille Nacht	Jonathan	
2004	Milan en de zielen	Mark	
2006	Don	Referee (final)	
2007	Love is All	Prins Valentijn	
2010	Tirza	Publisher	
2012	Süskind	Walter Süskind	
2012	Tony 10	Gilles	
2012	Jackie	Joost	
2013	App	Jerry	
2013	Mannenharten	Wouter	
2015	The Paradise Suite	Sven	
2015	Ja, ik wil!	Pieter	
2015	Mannenharten 2	Wouter	
2016	Meester Kikker	Teacher Franz	
2016	A Real Vermeer	Han van Meegeren	
2019	Bumperkleef	Hans	
2022	Hotel Sinestra		
