= Happy Single =

2023 Dutch film directed by Anna van Keimpema

- Theatrical release poster
- Directed by: Anna van Keimpema
- Produced by: Marcel de Block; Tom de Mol
- Edited by: Tim Wijbenga
- Music by: Joep Sporck
- Production companies: Interstellar Pictures; Tom de Mol Productions; Talpa Network
- Distributed by: Dutch FilmWorks
- Release date: 13 September 2023 (Netherlands)
- Country: Netherlands
- Language: Dutch

Happy Single is a 2023 Dutch romantic comedy film directed by Anna van Keimpema. The film won the Golden Film award after having sold 100,000 tickets.

Jamie Grant and Juvat Westendorp play lead roles in the film. Sanne Langelaar, Manuel Broekman and Barbara Sloesen also play a role in the film. Principal photography began in November 2021 in Utrecht, Netherlands.
