= Captain Nova =

- Theatrical release poster
- Directed by: Maurice Trouwborst
- Written by: Lotte Tabbers; Maurice Trouwborst
- Produced by: Koji Nelissen; Derk-Jan Warrink
- Starring: Kika van de Vijver; Anniek Pheifer
- Cinematography: Robbie van Brussel
- Edited by: Pelle Asselbergs
- Music by: Alexander Reumers
- Distributed by: Gusto entertainment (Netherlands); Dutch FilmWorks (International)
- Release date: 13 October 2021
- Running time: 86 minutes
- Country: Netherlands
- Language: Dutch
- Box office: $129,374

Captain Nova is a 2021 Dutch science fiction family film. It was selected as the opening film for the 35th Cinekid Festival, where it won Best Children's Film and Best Dutch Children's Film. The film had a limited Dutch cinema-release in 2021 due to the COVID-19 pandemic and was released worldwide on Netflix in 2022 but removed in April 2025.

== Cast ==
- Kika Van de Vijver as Nova
  - Anniek Pheifer as Nova 2050
- Marouane Meftah as Nas
  - Yahya Gaier as Nas 2050
- Hannah Van Lunteren as Claire

== Premise ==
In 2050 the Earth is on the brink of an environmental catastrophe. Captain Nova, a military pilot, travels 25 years into the past to alert the world and try to change their fate. Unfortunately when traveling back in time, Nova becomes her younger self and has difficulties delivering her message as a child.

== Reception ==
De Volkskrant gave the film 4 out of 5 stars, praising the high quality of the film. Flemish newspaper Het Nieuwsblad gave the film 3 stars. The film will play at the 2022 Netherlands Film Festival.
