= Voetbalvrouwen =

Dutch television series

Voetbalvrouwen is a Dutch dramedy favourably compared to Footballers' Wives. Three seasons (all available on DVD) have been taped since 2006; the first was shown in 2007 on the demissionary channel Tien, the second and third on RTL 4.

== Cast ==
The 'Voetbalvrouwen'

- Solange Ferrero-de Reuver: Nicolette van Dam (2007–2009)/Marit van Bohemen (2009–2010)
- Melanie Woesthoff-Zonderland: Lone van Roosendaal (2007–2010)
- Renske Doornbos-Veldman: Sophie van Oers (2007–2009)
- Liz Duivendrecht: Leontine Borsato (2007–2009)
- Kate Witte: Yolanthe Cabau van Kasbergen (2009–2010)
- Oksana Nikolajev: Peggy Vrijens (2009–2010)

Other appearances

- Danny Doornbos: Mike Weerts (2007–2010)
- Italo Ferrero: Bas Muijs (2007–2010
- Arjen Duivendrecht: Victor Low (2007)
- Jeffrey Woesthoff: Barry Atsma (2007–2008)
- Dylan Woesthoff: Manuel Broekman (2007)/Ludwig Bindervoet (2008)
- Rutger Carolus: Joep Sertons (2008–2010)
- Madonna Duprie-Zonderland: Marlous Dirks (2008–2010)
- Gio Goudzand: Curt Fortin (2008–2010)
- Hidde Storms: Wolter Muller (2008)
- Kofi Akua: André Dongelmans (2009–2010)

== Storylines ==
=== Season 1 (2007) ===
- Arjen Duivendrecht is the coach of Heros, a struggling football-club determined to regain its leading position. The arrival of centre-player Danny Doornbos means new positions for Italo Ferrero and the seasoned Jeffrey Woesthof. When Arjen's secret life as a transvestite gets media exposure he loses his credibility and commits suicide; unaware that he has a teenage-daughter (Jamie) on the account of stolen sperm.
- Arjen gets immediately replaced by Harry Reitsema whose big plans don't make him everyone's favourite person; the fab four, of whom Italo was dismissed as "a disturbing force" are dragged to the sidelines. Reitsema soon dies in a car crash, and Jeffrey subsequently operates as assistant coach.
- Renske, Danny's longtime-girlfriend, finds out that someone has installed cameras inside the Doornbos-mansion which recently played host to a murder turns out to have played host to a murder. It appears to be the stylist, a straight man with a gay image. Renske works with mentally challenged children, but loses her job because she's considered too glamorous. At her bachelorette party she gets laid by a Chippendale, a move she immediately regrets and only comes clean about days after her televised marriage. Danny suggests that Renske has been raped.
- Liz is married to Arjen with whom she lives at a farmhouse. After 20 years of playing second fiddle to her husband, Liz decides to turn the tables and suggests to live in Spain. Her dream gets shattered after Arjen's suicide.
- Solange, Italo's girlfriend, wants to have a career of her own but she's treated like a slave. She retaliates by stitching Dolce & Gabbana labels onto cut-price underwear and spiking Italo's smoothies with tranquillizers. Italo hits back by confiscating her passport on the eve of a trip to Milan with Melanie. Fed up with this male chauvinist behaviour Solange walks out but returns after getting proposed. She says yes on condition that she gets treated like a lady with a career and bank account to match.
- Melanie Woesthof, bodylifted and bleach-blonde, is Jeffrey's wife; she's the mother of his second-born son. Mel co-hosts a showbiz-news programme, but soon gets sacked because she's allegedly too old. When Jeffrey is up for a transfer to Bahrain Mel covers the stairs in soap because her lifestyle doesn't fit in a country where women are expected to walk the streets in veils and burqas. Disgusted with the men's relegation to less than a supporting role, Mel hatches a plot with Renske and Solange to get rid of Reitsema. They celebrate his death, but are caught doing so by the gossip-press and arrested after being exposed on a TV-show.

=== Season 2 (2008) ===
- The ladies are released due to lack of evidence but people are still keen to uncover the truth. And the truth is that Reitsema had a mentally challenged son whom Renske had contact with before the accident that could've been a fate shared by Solange's brother Mickey.
- Melanie's hotel-owning sister Madonna returns from France and she isn't pleased to see her, despite Madonna playing a key-role in Mel's pregnancy. The boys though are fond of her and when Madonna is banned from the place she buys the mansion next door. More bad news; Jeffrey decides to go to Bahrein after finding out Mel had Diego pretend to be ill (a role which he failed to stick to by crawling out of bed and sampling the snacks at the farewell-party). Broken-hearted Mel develops a drinking problem but is angry to learn from her sister's own brush with alcohol when attending an AA-meeting. She blows a chance to sing the Heros Club Anthem at the stadium (accompanied by Diego on piano) by getting drunk after press-speculations of Jeffrey having a new girlfriend. Mel plans to launch a celebrity magazine "that stands out from the others"; she's to interview Froukje de Both but ends up inviting her for a joyless day of shopping, meaning that Madonna has to rewrite the entire article. Mel eventually has enough and sends her packing; after an evening out she ends up puking in the canal and wakes up in a rehab-clinic where she refuses to participate in activities. Coming back home after only one day Mel's in for a few nasty surprises; her alcohol-consumption has left her with huge bills to pay, her magazine is cancelled after the staff unanimously walked out, Dylan shares a hotel room with goalie Hidde Storm and Diego has decided to move in with Madonna. Mel shifts her attention to Hidde whose part in the bribery scandal was exposed. At that point Jeffrey returns; Diego is sent back home with the promise that Dad will never abandon him again. Jeffrey is planning to take him to Bahrain but fails to inform him beforehand; consequently, Diego loses his trust and ends up jumping from the rooftop right before his parents' eyes
- Danny is ruled out after a serious injury; for his recovery he hires a mental coach who not only takes out the bad foods but also the joys of his marriage. Renske seeks and finds consolation in Danny's replacement Gio Goudzand who returned from a spell in Germany. She falls in love with him and ends up getting pregnant. Although her feelings aren't mutual, Renske insists that Gio stays away from her and claims that Danny is the father. Renske gives birth to a son Levi, but soon afterwards he gets abducted by a welfare mother who took advantage of Renske after nearly being driven down. Renske and Danny get their son back, but Gio discovers the truth by noting similarities to his own baby-picture. Abandoned by his own father, Gio wants to see Levi, but still the answer is no.
- Liz gets Arjen's will on the one condition that she lives a happy life; she buys a yacht and dates new coach Rutger Carolus; he breaks off the relationship feeling that it's a forced one. Liz moves on to Baron van Ravenswaaij, a rich man whom she first met during the party at her yacht. He wants to marry her but she has to give up on her friends; Liz refuses to do so and returns to Rutger.
- Italo promises to treat Solange right and not to cheat on her; a marriage is on the cards but Solange's AZ'67-supporting father only wants to give away his daughter in return for the Cup. Italo disagrees so Solange does the job; however, the marriage is off when Italo finds out that Mickey nearly endangered him by hiding drugs in his pad-case (stolen during a robbery on a CL-trip to Germany). He is so angry that he bans the family's trailer from his place. When Solange fails to appear at her own wedding Italo ends up marrying Rutger's daughter Tessa. This rebound doesn't last; Italo still loves Solange and after a call-to-truce they exchange their vows.

=== Season 3 (2009-2010) ===
- Solange neglects herself; she lies all day on the couch, wearing a trailer park suit and putting on weight. "I'm working on my inner-self" she claims, but Italo isn't buying it ("There is no inner-you!"); he's fed up with "being the laughing stock" and "coming home to Billy Bunter's sister". He not only threatens to divorce but also to cancel her credit card if she fails to get her act together. Following a photo-shoot for the canine-themed issue of Madonna's glossy. Solange gets driven down by Rutger (who consequently loses a pregnant Liz) and undergoes plastic surgery. Coming home with a new face she assumes that she's been mixed up because Dushi doesn't recognise her; then it transpires that Dushi's been mixed up with the dog of stylist Kate de Witte. Mickey introduces his wife-to-be; Roswita appears to be bisexual, she fancies Solange. Italo is keen on the idea of triple-sex; he arranges a date at a hotel but ends up facing the anger of Mickey.
- Kate meanwhile has got her own problems to fix; she gets pursued by Alex, a porn movie-director who has an old score to settle. Unless Kate pays him 100 grand, her vaulted performance will be put online. Kate finds out that Alex still fancies young girls but as he can't be arrested because the evidence tape is illegally retrieved she sets up a booby trap herself; she pretends to star in a new movie and draws a confession out of him whilst hiding a camera in her bag. Kate decides to use the tape in her advantage and becomes frontpage-news.
- Having spent a few weeks with her parents, Renske decided to split with Danny and return to her hometown. However, she settles for plan B; moving in with Gio who angers Danny further by taking over his place after an embarrassing start of the new season. Devastated though, Danny finds aversion in Kate who seems to be happy to play his new girlfriend. Renske finds out that Gio bypassed her for his ex-girlfriend Shirley to introduce Levi to his relatives. Renske wants to leave after all; Gio threatens to fight for full custody but backs down after Danny interferes. Danny can't cope with Kate's new-found media-attention and turns to coke.
- Diego is in hospital and there seems to be no progress in his condition. Truth is that he's putting on an Oscar-winning act because he wants to live with Madonna instead of with Mel; tied to a wheelchair he continues his farce for a while after coming home. Jeffrey knows too, and he threatens to cease all financial benefits if Mel doesn't let go of Diego. More bad news; her estranged father Dirk, recovering from a brain hemorrhage, gave up his French hideaway to live with his daughter. Mel passes on the responsibility to Madonna and insists that her son avoids his grandad. Diego wants answers after discovering eight years' worth of unreceived postcards; it transpires that he was spanked as a four-year-old for being disobedient and escaping from the cellar where he was told to stay. Dirk confesses, but he also regrets that Mel socialised with the wrong people and that she settled for an empty life of shopping sprees and drinking sessions; why didn't she use her potential like Madonna did? "Because you always kept me inside". Dirk only apologises when he nearly falls into the water with his zimmer frame. Father and daughter seem to make amends till Dirk collapses while fishing; he dies on the spot. To make matters worse, Diego has moved in with Madonna after all because Mel failed to pick him up. Then Madonna shows her true colours; she keeps Mel at arm's length and wants Diego all for herself as the daughter she never had. Mel consequently misses Dirk's final farewell but she finds comfort in Kofi Akua, a South African player who appears to be underaged and in line for an arranged marriage to a Ghanaian girl called Abba.
- Heros got a new president coming all the way from Ukraine; when he embarks on a so-called expedition he forwards his wife Oksana. Gio fancies her but Oksana isn't having any of it. Much to his surprise
- Mel and Kofi save Diego from Madonna who's taken to a mental institution. They still want to marry, but shortly before the big event, Mel discovers that Abba is carrying Diego's child. Madonna escapes from the institution and overpowers Melanie to take her place at the wedding which she ultimately turns into a bloodbath.
