= Alison Leslie Gold =

American author (1945-2025)

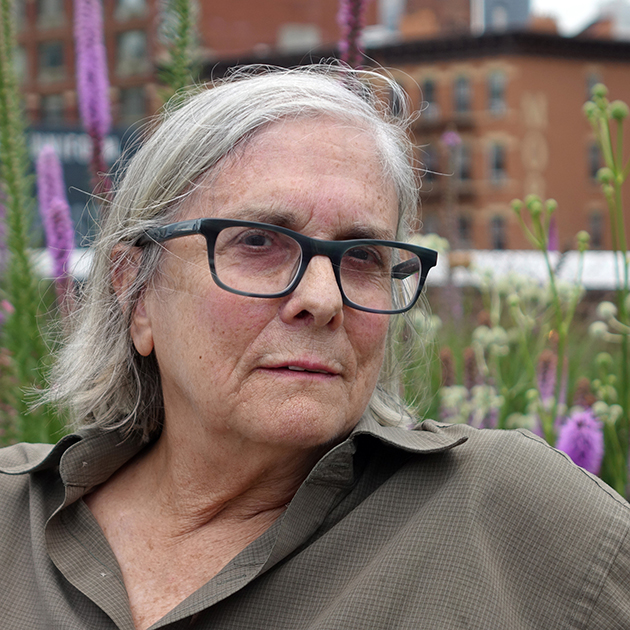
- Alison Leslie Gold, New York City, 2016
- Born: July 13, 1945; New York City, U.S.
- Died: September 9, 2025 (aged 80); New York City, U.S.
- Relatives: Maggie Greenwald (sister)
- Writing career
- Notable works: Anne Frank Remembered; The Clairvoyant; The Devil's Mistress
- Website: www.alisonlesliegold.com

Alison Leslie Gold (born July 13, 1945, died September 9, 2025) was an American author. Her books include Anne Frank Remembered, Clairvoyant: the Imagined Life of Lucia Joyce, The Devil's Mistress, and Memories of Anne Frank. She wrote literary fiction as well as books for young people on a wide range of subjects including alcoholic intervention and the Holocaust as experienced by the young. Her work has been translated into more than 25 languages.

== Biography ==
Gold was born on July 13, 1945, in Brooklyn, New York, and grew up in Bayside, Queens. She was educated at the University of North Carolina, Mexico City College and the New School for Social Research in New York City. For several years, she shared her time between her main home in New York City and Hydra, a small island in Greece.

Gold died in New York on September 9, 2025. Gold is survived by a son, Thor Gold, and two siblings: Nancy Greenwald and film director Maggie Greenwald. A third sibling, poet Ted Greenwald, predeceased her.

== Writing ==
Gold's books have been reviewed in The Times Literary Supplement, The Guardian, The New York Times, The New York Times Book Review, the Los Angeles Times, The Washington Post, the Chicago Tribune and O, The Oprah Magazine, among others. Anne Frank Remembered was on the May 17, 1987, New York Times best-seller list.

Gold described herself as a "salvager of other people's stories" and was most widely known for her work related to the Holocaust. Her book Anne Frank Remembered was co-written with Miep Gies, the employee of Otto Frank who hid Anne Frank and rescued Anne's diary. Gold similarly worked with Anne Frank's childhood friend Hannah (Hanneli) Goslar to write Memories of Anne Frank: Reflections of a Childhood Friend. On the occasion of the publication of Anne Frank Remembered, Elie Wiesel said of the book: "Let us give recognition to Alison Gold. Without her and her talent of persuasion, without her writer's talent, too, this poignant account, vibrating with humanity, would not have been written." Isaac Bashevis Singer commended Anne Frank Remembered as "Beautifully written". Fiet's Vase, Gold's collection of Holocaust survival accounts, was described by Sigrid Nunez as having "language as transparent as pure water"; according to another reviewer, each story "reads like a miracle, a silver chalice excavated from dust."

Gold's non-Holocaust work has not been as consistently well received. For example, some critics did not like the blend of historical fact and fictional elements in The Clairvoyant, an "imagined history" of the life of Lucia Joyce, the daughter of James Joyce. The Los Angeles Times observed that "so much is fabricated in Clairvoyant that anyone who reads it unaware of the real lives of James and Lucia Joyce will be led far off the mark". However, Irish author Padraic O'Farrell described Clairvoyant as "brilliantly innovative and movingly written". According The Times Literary Supplement, Gold's autobiographical Found and Lost, "captures the rough texture of lived experience in a way that often eludes more straightforward autobiography".

== Recognition ==
- Best of the Best: Twenty-five Years of Best Books for Young Adults, American Library Association, 1994 (Anne Frank Remembered)
- Christopher Award, 1988 (Anne Frank Remembered)
- Notable Books for a Global Society, 2000 (A Special Fate: Chiune Sugihara, Hero of the Holocaust)
- Nominated for National Book Award, 1997 (The Devil’s Mistress)

== Adaptations ==
- The Attic, television film adaptation of Anne Frank Remembered, 1988
- The Devil’s Mistress, one-woman stage show, 2007
- Mi Ricordo Anne Frank (“My Friend Anne Frank”), Italian television film adaptation of Memories of Anne Frank, Reflections of a Childhood Friend, 2009
- Mijn beste vriendin Anne Frank (“My Best Friend Anne Frank”), Dutch film adaptation of Memories of Anne Frank, Reflections of a Childhood Friend, 2021

== Bibliography ==
=== Adult non-fiction ===
- Anne Frank Remembered: The Story of the Woman Who Helped Hide the Frank Family (co-written with Miep Gies), 1987 (Special edition with new material, including new photographs, issued in 2009.) Also translated into 23 languages, including Chinese, Japanese and Korean
- Fiet's Vase and Other Stories of Survival, Europe 1939-1945, 2003, also translated into Slovenian
- Love in the Second Act, True Stories of Romance, Midlife and Beyond, 2006
- The Potato Eater, 2015
- Found and Lost: Mittens, Miep, and Shovelfuls of Dirt, 2017, ISBN 978-1-910749-59-3

=== Adult fiction ===
- Clairvoyant, the Imagined Life of Lucia Joyce, 1992
- The Devil's Mistress: the Diary of Eva Braun, the Woman Who Lived and Died with Hitler, 1997, also translated into Greek, Hungarian and Romanian
- The Woman Who Brought Matisse Back from the Dead, 2014
- Not Not a Jew, 2016 (novella)
- Ransom Notes, 2022

=== Young adult ===
- Memories of Anne Frank, Reflections of a Childhood Friend, 1997, also translated into 22 languages
- A Special Fate: Chiune Sugihara, Hero of the Holocaust, 2000
- Elephant in the Living Room (co-written with Darin Elliott), 2014
