= Re-Play =

Dutch R&B group from Rotterdam

- Origin: Rotterdam, Netherlands
- Genres: R&B, Pop
- Years active: 1992–present
- Labels: Columbia, Music Force
- Members: Alwin Burke; Mark Dakriet; Henk Waarde; Samuel de Wit
- Past members: Mario Raadwijk

Re-Play is a Dutch R&B group from Rotterdam. The group is composed of singers Alwin Burke, Mark Dakriet, Henk Waarde and Samuel de Wit. In the Netherlands they scored hits like Ala day (Ik leef alleen voor jou) en Never nooit meer.

== History ==
Re-Play was founded in 1990 by Surinamese-Dutch singers Alwin Burke, Henk Waarde and Samuel de Wit. In 1992, they participated in the Soundmixshow as The Pasadenas, and they also released two singles in Germany. At first, the group only sang in English, but after they heard Spanish-language versions of songs by Toni Braxton and Boyz II Men in Gran Canaria, they decided to sing in their native Dutch language. In 1995, Mark Dakriet joined the group.

In 1996, Re-Play released their first Dutch-language single "Ik denk aan jou". They followed up with the singles "Kijk om je heen", which became their first Dutch Top 40 hit in 1998, and their top ten hit "Ala day (Ik leef alleen voor jou)". In the same year they released their debut album Re-Play. The following year, the group worked with singer Gordon and released the duet song "Never nooit meer", which became their biggest hit and reached the top 5 in the Dutch charts.

In 2000, Re-Play left the small record label Rhythm Records and signed with Columbia Records. They released their second album Checkmate, which contained the singles "Kom dan bij mij" and "Over". In the years 2001 and 2002, Re-Play won a TMF Award for best Dutch R&B group. In 2002, they released a collaboration album with Gordon, Gordon & Re-Play (also called G&R), which contained the hit singles "Weet dat ik van je hou" and "Zolang".

In 2003, Mark Dakriet left the group for a solo career. He was replaced by Mario Raadwijk. In the same year, Re-Play won its third TMF Award for best Dutch R&B group, together with Gordon.

In 2004, Re-Play released the compilation album Vroeger voorbij - 10 jaar Re-Play, which contained two new songs. In 2005, the group left Columbia and the members founded their own record label Music Force, and released their fifth album Op eigen benen the following year. In 2007, they released their sixth album Dancing the night away.

In 2015, Mark Dakriet joined Re-Play again. The band made the title song for the 2020 romantic comedy film Casanova's directed by Jamel Aattache.

== Discography ==
Albums

- Re-Play (1998)
- Schaakmat (2000)
- Gordon & Re-Play with Gordon (2002)
- Vroeger voorbij - 10 jaar Re-Play (2004)
- Op eigen benen (2006)
- Dancing the night away (2007)
