= Tygo Gernandt =

Dutch actor (born 1974)

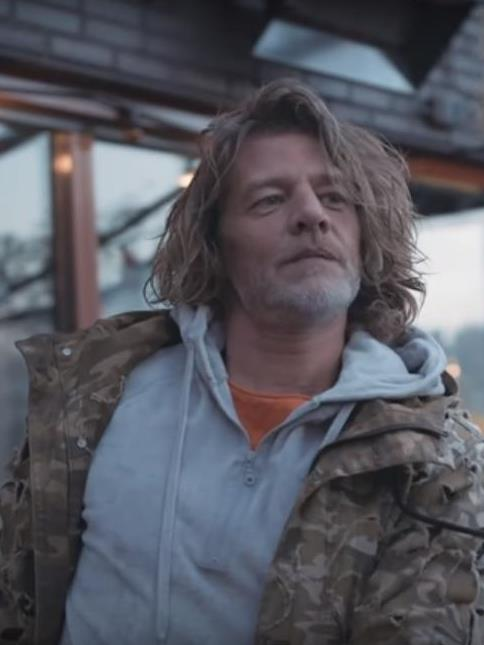
- Gernandt in 2019
- Born: 7 April 1974 (age 52); Amsterdam, Netherlands
- Occupation: Actor
- Website: http://www.tygogernandt.nl/

Tygo Gernandt (born 7 April 1974 in Amsterdam, North Holland) is a Dutch actor. He has appeared in several Dutch movies, among them Van God Los, Eilandgasten, Schnitzelparadijs and De Dominee. He also appeared in the BBC TV series The Last Kingdom.

== Career ==
Gernandt won a Golden Calf award for his performance in the Dutch movie Van God Los.

In 2006 he voiced Proog in the short film Elephants Dream.

In 2014, he participated in the 14th season of the popular television show Wie is de Mol?. In 2020, he appeared in a special anniversary edition of the show, called Wie is de Mol? Renaissance, which featured only contestants of previous seasons.

=== Film ===
Title	Year	Role
Angie	1993	Freddy
Naar de klote!	1996	Martijn
Jezus is een Palestijn	1999	Steven
Soul Assassin	2001	Sushi Guy
Van God Los	2003	Maikel Verheije
De dominee	2004	Guard Piet
Joyride	2005	Tim
Het Schnitzelparadijs	2005	Goran
Offers	2005	Kevin
Eilandgasten	2006	Chiel
Ik omhels je met 1000 armen	2006	Egon
Zoop in India	2006	Voice of Thakur
Paid	2006	Bennie
SEXtet	2007	Man antiquity
Nefarious	2008	Brian
Dunya en Desie in Marokko	2008	Pim
Oorlogswinter	2008	Bertus
Carmen van het Noorden	2009	Joz Jansen
Mijn vader is een detective	2009	Benno
Het leven uit een dag	2009	Scant
First Mission	2010	Barry
Black Death	2010	Ivo
VAST	2010	Mike
Dolfje Weerwolfje	2011	Animal noises Dolfje
Making of	2011	Jimmy
Süskind	2012	Piet Meerburg
Hartenstraat	2014	Bas
Bloedlink	2014	Victor
Michiel de Ruyter	2015	Willem Joseph van Ghent
Jack bestelt een broertje	2015	Berend
Boy 7	2015	Zero
Kill Switch	2017	Michael
Voor Galg en Rad	2018	Matthijs Ponts
Baantjer: het begin	2019	Tonnie Montijn
Pirates Down the Street	2020	Bony Krelis
Casanova's	2020	Don Marco, "dating coach"
Bon Bini Holland 3	2022	

=== Television ===
Title	Year(s)	Role	Notes
Goede tijden, slechte tijden	1991	Carl/Kees Peper	7 episodes/1 episode
Oppassen!!!	1992	Skater	Episode: "IJspret"
12 steden, 13 ongelukken	1992–1995	Multiple roles	Episode: "Huisarrest (Kampen)" (1992) — Robert; Episode: "De vingerwijzing van Osiris (Monnickendam)" (1993) — Walter; Episode: "Een bocht teveel" (1995) — Felix
Voor hete vuren	1995	Michael	Episodes: "Broederliefde", "Prettige feestdagen"
Ik ben je moeder niet	1995–1996	Multiple roles	Episode: "Software house" (1995) — Michael; Episode: "Prenatale depressie" (1996) — Marc
Fort Alpha	1996–1997	Dennis Hulshof	20 episodes
Combat	1998	Floris Ekkel	13 episodes
Baantjer	1999	Rijk van Laak	Episode: "De Cock en de moord op internet"
Westenwind	1999–2000	Leo	Episode: "De verloren dochter" (1999), "Race naar het einde" (1999), "Bluffen duurt het langst" (2000)
De Garage	1999–2001	Lenny	2 seasons
All Stars — De serie	2001	Fast boy #2	Episode: "Big soccer"
Echt waar	2002	Gerrard Blijleven	Episode: "De schilder"
Toen Was Geluk Heel Gewoon	2003	Mick Jagger	Episode: "Heintje"
Spangen	2003	Dennis Raas	Episode: "Scheuren"
Kees & Co	2004	Stanley	Episode: "En allemaal mee eten"
't Schaep met de 5 pooten	2007	Verhuizer Toon	Episode: "Blijf uit onze buurt!"
Van Speijk	2006–2007	Sylvester Daals	26 episodes
Roes	2008	Man at bus stop	Episode: "Simon says"
Het schnitzelparadijs	2008	Goran	10 episodes
Vuurzee	2009	Christiaan Spiedijk	Episodes: "Doe maar diep", "Tien dagen", "Graven maar"
Dennis en Valerio vs de rest	2010	Himself/ Danny	Short Watch part episode
De Bende van Sjako	2010–2011	Gomez	8 episodes
Flikken Maastricht	2011, 2021	Multiple roles	Episode: "Verzorgd" — Wouter van Rijn (2011); Episode: "Hoop sterft het laatst" [Parts 1 & 2] — Eddie Wijnberg (2021)
Godforsaken	2011	Gerrie	Episode: "Kortsluiting"
De Vier van Westwijk	2012	Charlie	8 episodes
Dokter Tinus	2012–2017	Ken Derks/Vreugdenhil	
Wie is de Mol?	2014	Himself — candidate	9 afleveringen
Toon	2016	Security guard	Episode: "Finale"
Ik hou van Holland	2016	Himself — participant	Team Jeroen
The Big Escape	2017	Himself — participant	
Tygo in de GHB	2018	Presenter	Documentary series from the Evangelische Omroep
The Last Kingdom	2018, 2020	Jackdaw	8 episodes
Baantjer	2019	Tonnie Montijn	1 season
De Kluis (webseries)	2019, 2021	Himself — participant	Team 1 (2019); Team 2 (2021)
Tygo in de psychiatrie	2019–2020	Presenter	Documentary series from the Evangelische Omroep
Wie is de Mol? Renaissance	2020	Himself	Losing finalist
The Passion	2021	Pontius Pilatus	
Make Up Your Mind	2021	Lady Garga	4th place
The Masked Singer	2021	De Giraffe	4th place
