= Yolanthe Cabau =

Spanish-Dutch actress and presenter

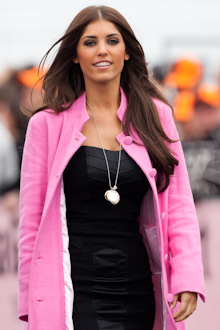
- Cabau at the Giro d'Italia in 2010
- Born: Yolanthe Cabau van Kasbergen; 19 March 1985 (age 41); Ibiza, Balearic Islands, Spain
- Other names: Yolanthe Sneijder-Cabau; Yolanthe van Kasbergen
- Occupations: Actress, model, television host
- Years active: 2004–present
- Spouse: Wesley Sneijder (m. 2010; sep. 2019)
- Children: 1

Yolanthe Cabau (née Cabau van Kasbergen; 19 March 1985) is a Spanish-Dutch actress, model and television host.

== Early life ==
Cabau was born on the Spanish island of Ibiza. Her father, Xavier Cabau, was Spanish, while her mother, Richarda "Rici" van Kasbergen, is Dutch. Xavier Cabau was a wealthy entrepreneur known as the "King of Ibiza", who owned several discothèques, restaurants, and bars. Cabau's childhood in Spain was marked by domestic violence, after her father experienced financial problems and became addicted to drugs. When she was five years old, her mother moved with her children to her native Netherlands. She has three siblings, as well as nine half-siblings from her father's side. After graduating from high school at the age of 17, Cabau decided to pursue an acting career.

== Career ==
Cabau appeared in the Dutch productions Snowfever (2004) and Costa! (2005). From 2005 to 2008, she had a recurring role in the soap opera Onderweg naar morgen. In 2006, Cabau starred in the short film Turkse chick, which was nominated for a Gouden Kalf, the Dutch equivalent of an Academy Award. The film contained a controversial sex scene to which Cabau received public backlash. She later admitted that she regrets doing the scene. A real-life WAG, she appeared in the third season of the dramedy Voetbalvrouwen, similar to the British series Footballers' Wives. In 2006, 2007, and 2009, Cabau was voted the "Sexiest Dutch Woman" by the Dutch FHM. In June 2025, Cabau starred in Yolanthe, a seven-part reality series released on Netflix, marking the platform's first Dutch reality production.

== Personal life ==
Cabau was dating singer Jan Smit from January 2007 till May 2009. They ended their relationship a few days after Cabau was photographed with football player Wesley Sneijder. Cabau and Sneijder were married on 17 July 2010 in Tuscany, Italy, six days after Sneijder played the final of the FIFA World Cup. The couple has one son. Following her marriage, she changed her surname from Cabau van Kasbergen to Sneijder-Cabau, which she also uses professionally.

Cabau is a co-founder and ambassador of Stop Kindermisbruik, a foundation which aims to put an end to child sexual abuse in developing countries. Stop Kindermisbruik engages in actions such as freeing child prostitutes, preventing children from becoming child prostitutes, and helping freed children cope with the trauma they endured.

On March 5, 2019, the couple announced their decision to split up, but made it clear that there was not (yet) going to be a divorce. Yolanthe stopped using the name Sneijder-Cabau and refers to herself now as Yolanthe Cabau.

== Filmography ==
=== Film ===
Year	Title	Role	Notes
2004	Snowfever	Brenda "Banaantje"	Credited as Yolanthe van Kasbergen
2005	Costa! 1001 nacht	Harem woman	uncredited
2006	Turkse Chick	Dilara	Short film; Credited as Yolanthe Cabau van Kasbergen
2006	Complexx	Lianne	Credited as Yolanthe Cabau van Kasbergen
2009	Het geheim van Mega Mindy	Miss Volta / Mega Volta	Credited as Yolanthe Cabau van Kasbergen
2013	Valentino	Nienke	Credited as Yolanthe Sneijder-Cabau
2013	Pain & Gain	Annalee Calvera	Credited as Yolanthe Sneijder-Cabau
2014	Stuk!	Saar Beerman	Credited as Yolanthe Sneijder-Cabau
2015	Kidnapping Mr. Heineken	Pretty woman 2	Credited as Yolanthe Sneijder-Cabau
2015	Polis Akademisi: Alaturka	Susan	Credited as Yolanthe Sneijder-Cabau
2015	Popoz	Sacha	Credited as Yolanthe Sneijder-Cabau
2019	F*ck Love	Bo	
2021	Just Say Yes	Lotte	
2021	Liefde zonder grenzen	Eva	
2022	F*ck Love Too	Bo	
2022	De allergrootste slijmfilm	Gwen	
2022	Egyptian Affair	Safiya	
2023	Oei, ik groei!	Ilse	
2023	Secrets of a Celebrity Nanny	Justice	Television film
2023	Deadly DILF	Mera	
2025	Perfectly Imperfect	Nicky Bierens	
2025	Mr. & Mrs. Aslan	Luna Aslan	
2025	Gangstas	Evita	

=== Television ===
Year	Title	Role	Notes
2004	Villa Genetica	Julia	1 episode
2004	Het glazen huis	Student	2 episodes
2005–2008	Onderweg naar Morgen	Julia Branca	Main cast, ±360 episodes
2006	Sprint!	Beautiful woman	1 episode
2008	Twinzz	Herself (host)	9 episodes
2009–2010	Voetbalvrouwen	Kate Witte	Main cast, 13 episodes
2010	Stedenspel	Herself (host)	10 episodes
2010	Flikken Maastricht	Elke	1 episode
2011	Het perfecte plaatje	Herself (host)	8 episodes
2012	Van God Los	Mathilde Bruma	1 episode
2014	Rechercheur Ria	Babette Hofman	1 episode
2014	Yolanthe	Herself	Reality Show, 7 episodes
2014–2015	Bluf	Shira Goudsmit	Main cast, 18 episodes
2015	Expeditie Poolcirkel	Herself (host)	8 episodes
2016	De Nationale Sekstest 2016	Herself (host)	Television special
2016	De Nationale Verkeerstest 2016	Herself (host)	Television special
2017	De Nationale Sekstest 2017	Herself (host)	Television special
2017	Reunited	Herself (host)	6 episodes
2018	De Jongens tegen de Meisjes	Herself (host/team captain)	6 episodes
2018–2019	Temptation Island VIPS	Herself (host)	26 episodes
2018	De TV Kantine	Morticia Addams	1 episode
2018	The Talent Project	Herself (host)	6 episodes
2019	DNA	Lara Noort	Main cast, 10 episodes
2026	Playing Her Dirty	Isa Caruso	Main cast, 70 episodes
