= The Wonder Weeks =

Book by Hetty van de Rijt

The Wonder Weeks: A Stress-Free Guide to Your Baby's Behavior
- 2019 English edition
- Author: Hetty van de Rijt, Frans X. Plooij, Xaveira Plas-Plooij
- Subject: Infant development
- Publisher: W.W. Norton/Countryman Press
- Publication date: 1992 (Dutch)
- English publication date: 2003-2019
- Pages: 464
- ISBN: 978-1-68268-427-6

The Wonder Weeks: A Stress-Free Guide to Your Baby's Behavior is a book with advice to parents about child development by physical anthropologist Hetty van de Rijt and ethologist and developmental psychologist Frans Plooij. Their daughter Xaviera Plas-Plooij is a third author of recent editions. It was first published in English in 2003 as the translation of the 1992 Dutch book Oei, ik groei! The book claims that the cognitive development of babies occurs in predictably timed stages. Ever since the systematic study of child development began at the beginning of the 20th century researchers have disagreed whether this is gradual or in punctuated stages. Some figures in the child development field have objected that sleep regressions are not so predictable. A chapter on sleep was added to the 6th edition in 2019. The publisher has produced a mobile app based on the book.

== Claims ==
The book describes 10 predictable 'leaps' observed in a child's cognitive development during the first 20 months, with 8 in the first year. (Months are counted from the due date because development begins with conception.) They are predicted to occur at about 5, 8, 12, 17, 26, 36, 44, 53, 61-62 and 72-73 weeks old. Each developmental 'leap' is said to begin with a regression period in which the baby becomes more insecure, clinging, and cranky, followed by a longer period in which the baby is more happy gaining confidence with new perceptions and skills. The book claims that this enables parents and caregivers to make better choices of age-appropriate toys, activities, and interactions to support the baby's development at each stage.

== Scientific basis ==
Ethologists have documented predictable 'regression periods' in the interactions of mothers and infants in many species, suggesting an early origin in evolution. In the course of a 1971-1973 longitudinal ethological study of chimpanzees in the wild, working with Jane Goodall, van de Rijt and Plooij published additional data demonstrating predictable regression periods in Chimpanzee mother-infant dyads, the correlation of illnesses with these, and the importance of the mother's interactions for the baby's growing independence and learning. They hypothesized a new type of learning important in the evolution of human parenting, with reference to an explanation in control theory. To test this hypothesis, they applied the observational methodology of ethology to human mothers and infants. Their first human study, involving 15 Dutch mothers and their infants, with extrinsic sources of stress carefully controlled, was published in the Journal of Reproductive and Infant Psychology in 1992.

Independent replication studies were carried out at universities in four culturally divergent countries. Three were presented in a symposium held at Göteborg University Sweden on October 10—11, 1997 (The First Research Conference on Regression Periods in Early Infancy) and published in 2003: Groningen in the Netherlands, Oxford in England, Gothenburg in Sweden, and Girona in Spain. The Spanish study was also published in a peer-reviewed journal. Another peer-reviewed study included verification of parents' reports that babies master a cluster of new skills after each regression period.

Research by Colwyn Trevarthen and Kenneth J. Aitken into development of the central nervous system has identified periods of rapid change (PRC) which coincide with the observed regression periods, and known stages of neurological development of the brain have been correlated with the behavioral observations. Consistent with the hypothesis of increased stress, a correlation between regression periods and upticks of illness has been reported, and a correlation with SIDS.

A 2020 newspaper article about 'sleep regressions' quotes some professional skepticism and caution. Dr. Jodi Mindell, Ph.D., a child psychologist specializing in sleep at Children’s Hospital of Philadelphia, has objected that for a theory of sleep patterns “it has to be a very large sample. I think that means looking at thousands of babies.” Dr. Kathy Hirsh-Pasek, Ph.D., a psychologist who studies infant language at Temple University in Philadelphia, said that she had “never heard of anything that is that prescriptive”, but “we really are at the infancy of infant brain knowledge”. However, Dr. Pamela Hops, M.D., a pediatrician in New York City, said “I think he’s spot on, shockingly so” and that during her 20 years of practice, she has anecdotally seen and heard about changes in babies that perfectly align with the 10 leaps Dr. Plooij described.

== Controversy ==
The first attempt at a replication study failed to support these findings. The reasons for the failure became controversial.

With state funding for an independent replication of the research with human mothers and infants, Frans Plooij obtained a temporary research position at the University of Groningen, where he had earned his degrees, and engaged a PhD student, Carolina de Weerth. She observed behavior of four infants and tested their cortisol levels as a measure of stress, and failed to find any evidence of greater fussiness or higher cortisol levels corresponding to the leaps. She later suggested that this might be due to inadequate sample size. Plooij objected that this was not a replication because the relevant data were obscured by extrinsic sources of stress which she failed to control, and because the observational data were limited to her visits once a week, whereas in the original study the mothers recorded specified observations each half-hour interval of the day, and the researchers validated these data observationally with two of the 15 families. De Weerth and her dissertation supervisor, Paul van Geert, said that Frans Plooij tried to pressure her into not publishing the study. She also said he refused to share with her his original data. Plooij has disputed this account. The University of Groningen declined to renew his contract following the dispute, but Plooij says he left voluntarily. De Weerth's dissertation was published with van Geert as co-author.

At a conference in 1997 (and published in 2003), Plooij and van de Rijt-Plooij reported that when the effects of those extrinsic sources of stress which de Weerth had identified are factored out from her data the regression periods are evident. The following year, 1998, the scientific controversy was made the focal topic of an issue of the journal Neuropsychiatrica (entirely in Dutch) with an article by Plooij, a rejoinder by van Geert and de Weerth, and a reply by Plooij to which no rejoinder has been published. Plooij has continued his research, with publications including peer-reviewed book chapters.
