= The Preacher (film) =

2004 film

- Theatrical release poster
- Directed by: Gerrard Verhage
- Written by: Gerrard Verhage
- Based on: De Dominee by Bart Middelburg
- Cinematography: Theo Bierkens
- Edited by: Charlotte van der Veen
- Music by: Fons Merkies
- Production companies: Theorema Films; VARA
- Distributed by: A-Film Distribution
- Release date: 2 September 2004
- Running time: 110 minutes
- Country: Netherlands
- Language: Dutch
- Budget: €2,000,000 (est.)

The Preacher (Dutch: De Dominee) is a 2004 Dutch thriller film about a drug lord named Klaas Donkers. The film is based on Bart Middelburg's biography of real-life drug lord Klaas Bruinsma.

The film received a great deal of attention because it came out shortly after the Mabel Wisse Smit affair, which was caused by Dutch princess Mabel confessing to having lied to the Dutch royal family about her past relationship with Bruinsma.

== Cast ==
- Peter Paul Muller as Klaas Donkers
- Frank Lammers as Adri Slotemaker
- Chantal Janzen as Annet
- Mike Reus as Pim
- Tygo Gernandt as Piet
- Roeland Fernhout as Ronald-Jan
- Cas Jansen as Pieter Slotemaker
- Rick Nicolet as Rie Slotemaker
- Huub Stapel as Anton Donkers
- Alwien Tulner as Sylvia
- Pleuni Touw as Jet Donkers
- Marcel Musters as Broer Hansen
- Christian Kmiotek as Jutka Djindjiz
- Dean Constantin as Colombian dealer
- Jeroen Spitzenberger as Jan de Geus
- Keith Davis as Hugo Duvall

== Awards ==
Accolades received by The Preacher
Year	Award	Category	Recipient(s)	Result	Ref.
2004	Netherlands Film Festival	Golden Calf for Best Production Design	Marco Rooth	Won	
2004	Netherlands Film Festival	Golden Calf for Best Actor	Frank Lammers	Nominated	
2004	Netherlands Film Festival	Golden Calf for Best Director	Gerrard Verhage	Nominated	
2004	Netherlands Film Festival	Golden Calf for Best Cinematography	Theo Bierkens	Nominated	
