= Men at Work 3 =

2025 Dutch film directed by Aram van de Rest

- Directed by: Aram van de Rest
- Produced by: Johan Nijenhuis
- Distributed by: Dutch FilmWorks
- Release date: 6 October 2025
- Country: Netherlands
- Language: Dutch

Men at Work 3 (Dutch: Onze Jongens 3) is a 2025 Dutch romantic comedy film directed by Aram van de Rest. The film is the sequel to the 2020 film Men at Work: Miami. It won the Golden Film award after having sold 100,000 tickets. Thijs Boermans, Vajèn van den Bosch and Charly Luske play roles in the film.

Principal photography began in May 2025. The film finished in 6th place in the list of best visited Dutch films of 2025. In total, just over 190,000 tickets were sold.

== Cast ==
- Thijs Boermans as David
- Vajèn van den Bosch as Daphne
- Rein van Duivenboden as Jerry
- Charly Luske as Milo
- Martijn Fischer as Bas
- Kim-Lian as Linda
