= Carolina de Weerth =

Dutch childhood development researcher

Carolina de Weerth is a Dutch professor of medical sciences and PI of the Developmental Psychobiology Lab at the Radboud University Medical Center where she researches early childhood development. She obtained her Ph.D. in developmental psychology from University of Groningen where she researched infant stress. She found a relationship between colic and the gut microbiome, as well as a relationship between stress and pregnancies outcomes. Currently she's researching the effect of skin to skin contact and milk composition on the infant gut microbiome.

== Bibliography ==
- Eckermann, Henrik Andreas; Meijer, Jennifer; Cooijmans, Kelly; Lahti, Leo; de Weerth, Carolina (2024). "Daily skin-to-skin contact alters microbiota development in healthy full-term infants". Gut Microbes. 16 (1) 2295403. doi:10.1080/19490976.2023.2295403. ISSN 1949-0984. PMC 10793693. PMID 38197254.
- de Weerth, Carolina (December 2017). "Do bacteria shape our development? Crosstalk between intestinal microbiota and HPA axis". Neuroscience & Biobehavioral Reviews. 83: 458–471. doi:10.1016/j.neubiorev.2017.09.016.
- Missler, Marjolein A.; Van Straten, Annemieke; Denissen, Jaap J. A.; Donker, Tara; De Weerth, Carolina; Beijers, Roseriet (2021-07-01). "The first 12.5 years of parenthood: A latent trait-state occasion model of the longitudinal association between maternal distress and child internalizing and externalizing problems". Developmental Psychology. 57 (7): 1124–1135. doi:10.1037/DEV0001203. hdl:1874/418891. PMID 34435827. S2CID 237306852.
- Hechler, Christine; Beijers, Roseriet; Riksen-Walraven, J. Marianne; De Weerth, Carolina (2018-07-01). "Are cortisol concentrations in human breast milk associated with infant crying?". Developmental Psychobiology. 60 (6): 639–650. doi:10.1002/DEV.21761. PMC 6120523. PMID 29961271.
- Harris, Vanessa; Ali, Asad; Fuentes, Susana; Korpela, Katri; Kazi, Momin; Tate, Jacqueline; Parashar, Umesh; Wiersinga, W. Joost; Giaquinto, Carlo; De Weerth, Carolina; De Vos, Willem M. (2017-09-29). "Rotavirus Vaccine Response Correlates with the Infant Gut Microbiota Composition in Pakistan". Gut Microbes. 9 (2): 93–101. doi:10.1080/19490976.2017.1376162. PMC 5989807. PMID 28891751.
- De Weerth, Carolina (2017-09-13). "Do bacteria shape our development? Crosstalk between intestinal microbiota and HPA axis". Neuroscience & Biobehavioral Reviews. 83: 458–471. doi:10.1016/J.NEUBIOREV.2017.09.016. PMID 28918360. S2CID 40601114.
- McGauran, Monica; Jordan, Brigid; Beijers, Roseriet; Janssen, Irma; Franich-Ray, Candice; De Weerth, Carolina; Cheung, Michael (2017-07-18). "Long-term alteration of the hypothalamic-pituitary-adrenal axis in children undergoing cardiac surgery in the first 6 months of life" (PDF). Stress. 20 (5): 505–512. doi:10.1080/10253890.2017.1349748. PMID 28720027. S2CID 205671553.
- Zijlmans, Maartje A. C.; Beijers, Roseriet; Riksen-Walraven, Marianne J.; De Weerth, Carolina (2017-07-09). "Maternal late pregnancy anxiety and stress is associated with children's health: a longitudinal study". Stress. 20 (5): 495–504. doi:10.1080/10253890.2017.1348497. hdl:2066/179054. PMID 28691638.
- Cooijmans, Kelly H. M.; Beijers, Roseriet; Rovers, Anne C.; De Weerth, Carolina (2017-07-06). "Effectiveness of skin-to-skin contact versus care-as-usual in mothers and their full-term infants: study protocol for a parallel-group randomized controlled trial". BMC Pediatrics. 17 (1): 154. doi:10.1186/S12887-017-0906-9. PMC 5501342. PMID 28683833.
- Simons, Sterre S. H.; Cillessen, Antonius H. N.; De Weerth, Carolina (2016-12-27). "Associations between circadian and stress response cortisol in children". Stress. 20 (1): 52–58. doi:10.1080/10253890.2016.1276165. hdl:2066/167424. PMID 28027684.
- Harris, Vanessa C.; Armah, George; Fuentes, Susana; Korpela, Katri E.; Parashar, Umesh; Victor, John C.; Tate, Jacqueline; De Weerth, Carolina; Giaquinto, Carlo; Wiersinga, Willem Joost; Lewis, Kristen D C.; De Vos, Willem M. (2016-10-31). "Significant Correlation Between the Infant Gut Microbiome and Rotavirus Vaccine Response in Rural Ghana". Journal of Infectious Diseases. 215 (1): 34–41. doi:10.1093/INFDIS/JIW518. PMC 5225256. PMID 27803175.
- Simons, Sterre S.H.; Cillessen, Antonius H.N.; De Weerth, Carolina (2016-10-24). "Cortisol stress responses and children's behavioral functioning at school". Developmental Psychobiology. 59 (2): 217–224. doi:10.1002/DEV.21484. PMC 5324537. PMID 27774583.
- Beijers, Roseriet; Riksen-Walraven, Marianne; Sebesta, Katharina; De Weerth, Carolina (2016-10-04). "Differential associations between behavioral and cortisol responses to a stressor in securely versus insecurely attached infants" (PDF). Behavioural Brain Research. 325 (Pt B): 147–155. doi:10.1016/J.BBR.2016.10.008. PMID 27717814. S2CID 4147407.
- Albers, Esther M.; Beijers, Roseriet; Riksen-Walraven, J. Marianne; Sweep, Fred C.G. J.; De Weerth, Carolina (2015-10-12). "Cortisol levels of infants in center care across the first year of life: links with quality of care and infant temperament". Stress. 19 (1): 8–17. doi:10.3109/10253890.2015.1089230. PMID 26455788.
- Simons, Sterre S.H.; Beijers, Roseriet; Cillessen, Antonius H.N.; De Weerth, Carolina (2015-09-05). "Development of the cortisol circadian rhythm in the light of stress early in life" (PDF). Psychoneuroendocrinology. 62: 292–300. doi:10.1016/J.PSYNEUEN.2015.08.024. PMID 26352482. S2CID 13003093.
- Cohen-Bendahan, Celina C.C.; Beijers, Roseriet; Van Doornen, Lorenz J.P.; De Weerth, Carolina (2015-08-17). "Explicit and implicit caregiving interests in expectant fathers: Do endogenous and exogenous oxytocin and vasopressin matter?" (PDF). Infant Behavior and Development. 41: 26–37. doi:10.1016/J.INFBEH.2015.06.007. PMID 26292177.
- Zijlmans, Maartje A.C.; Riksen-Walraven, J. Marianne; De Weerth, Carolina (2015-03-17). "Associations between maternal prenatal cortisol concentrations and child outcomes: A systematic review". Neuroscience & Biobehavioral Reviews. 53: 1–24. doi:10.1016/J.NEUBIOREV.2015.02.015. PMID 25795521. S2CID 262421534.
- Zijlmans, Maartje A.C.; Korpela, Katri; Riksen-Walraven, J. Marianne; De Vos, Willem M.; De Weerth, Carolina (2015-01-19). "Maternal prenatal stress is associated with the infant intestinal microbiota". Psychoneuroendocrinology. 53: 233–245. doi:10.1016/J.PSYNEUEN.2015.01.006. PMID 25638481. S2CID 8128183.
- Sung, J.; Beijers, R.; Gartstein, M. A.; De Weerth, C.; Putnam, S. P. (2015-01-01). "Exploring temperamental differences in infants from the United States of America (US) and the Netherlands". European Journal of Developmental Psychology. 12 (1): 15–28. doi:10.1080/17405629.2014.937700. PMC 4241345. PMID 25429303.
- De Veld, Danielle M. J.; Riksen-Walraven, J. Marianne; De Weerth, Carolina (2014-08-11). "Does the arrival index predict physiological stress reactivity in children". Stress. 17 (5): 383–388. doi:10.3109/10253890.2014.936004. PMID 24930802.
- Beijers, Roseriet; Buitelaar, Jan K.; De Weerth, Carolina (2014-05-30). "Mechanisms underlying the effects of prenatal psychosocial stress on child outcomes: beyond the HPA axis" (PDF). European Child & Adolescent Psychiatry. 23 (10): 943–956. doi:10.1007/S00787-014-0566-3. PMID 24875898. S2CID 20220888.
- Van Strien, Tatjana; Ouwens, Machteld A.; Engel, Carmen; De Weerth, Carolina (2014-04-23). "Hunger, inhibitory control and distress-induced emotional eating". Appetite. 79: 124–133. doi:10.1016/J.APPET.2014.04.020. hdl:2066/129253. PMID 24768894. S2CID 17260188.
- De Veld, Danielle M.J.; Riksen-Walraven, J. Marianne; De Weerth, Carolina (2013-12-24). "The relation between gaze aversion and cortisol reactivity in middle childhood". Hormones and Behavior. 65 (2): 173–178. doi:10.1016/J.YHBEH.2013.12.012. PMID 24370687. S2CID 25097536.
- De Weerth, Carolina; Buitelaar, Jan K.; Beijers, Roseriet (2013-10-06). "Infant cortisol and behavioral habituation to weekly maternal separations: links with maternal prenatal cortisol and psychosocial stress". Psychoneuroendocrinology. 38 (12): 2863–2874. doi:10.1016/J.PSYNEUEN.2013.07.014. hdl:2066/125975. PMID 24103888.
- De Weerth, C.; Fuentes, S.; De Vos, W. M. (2013-08-09). "Crying in infants: on the possible role of intestinal microbiota in the development of colic". Gut Microbes. 4 (5): 416–421. doi:10.4161/GMIC.26041. PMC 3839988. PMID 23941920.
- Zijlmans, Maartje A. C.; Beijers, Roseriet; Mack, Simon; Pruessner, Jens C.; De Weerth, Carolina (2013-02-11). "Cortisol responses to social evaluation in 10- to 15-year-old boys and girls". Stress. 16 (4): 393–401. doi:10.3109/10253890.2013.764494. PMID 23398542. S2CID 23170777.
- De Weerth, Carolina; Fuentes, Susana; Puylaert, Philippe; De Vos, Willem M. (2013-01-14). "Intestinal microbiota of infants with colic: development and specific signatures" (PDF). Pediatrics. 131 (2): e550-8. doi:10.1542/PEDS.2012-1449. PMID 23319531. S2CID 6901870.
- Beijers, Roseriet; Riksen-Walraven, J. Marianne; De Weerth, Carolina (2012-11-29). "Cortisol regulation in 12-month-old human infants: associations with the infants' early history of breastfeeding and co-sleeping". Stress. 16 (3): 267–277. doi:10.3109/10253890.2012.742057. PMID 23116166.
- Van Strien, Tatjana; Roelofs, Karin; De Weerth, Carolina (2012-09-19). "Cortisol reactivity and distress-induced emotional eating" (PDF). Psychoneuroendocrinology. 38 (5): 677–684. doi:10.1016/J.PSYNEUEN.2012.08.008. PMID 22999262. S2CID 2594575.
- De Veld, Danielle M.J.; Riksen-Walraven, J. Marianne; De Weerth, Carolina (2012-02-05). "The relation between emotion regulation strategies and physiological stress responses in middle childhood". Psychoneuroendocrinology. 37 (8): 1309–1319. doi:10.1016/J.PSYNEUEN.2012.01.004. PMID 22309825.
- De Graag, Jolien A.; Cox, Ralf F.A.; Hasselman, Fred; Jansen, Jarno; De Weerth, Carolina (2012-01-10). "Functioning within a relationship: mother-infant synchrony and infant sleep" (PDF). Infant Behavior and Development. 35 (2): 252–263. doi:10.1016/J.INFBEH.2011.12.006. PMID 22240013.
- Beijers, Roseriet; Jansen, Jarno; Riksen-Walraven, Marianne; De Weerth, Carolina (2011-11-01). "Attachment and infant night waking: a longitudinal study from birth through the first year of life". Journal of Developmental and Behavioral Pediatrics. 32 (9): 635–643. doi:10.1097/DBP.0B013E318228888D. hdl:2066/99650. PMID 21743349. S2CID 30060857.
- Peters, Ellen; Riksen-Walraven, J. Marianne; Cillessen, Antonius H. N.; De Weerth, Carolina (2011-10-25). "Peer rejection and HPA activity in middle childhood: friendship makes a difference". Child Development. 82 (6): 1906–1920. doi:10.1111/J.1467-8624.2011.01647.X. PMID 22026414.
- Van Strien, Tatjana; Herman, C. Peter; Anschutz, Doeschka J.; Engels, Rutger C.M.E.; De Weerth, Carolina (2011-10-15). "Moderation of distress-induced eating by emotional eating scores". Appetite. 58 (1): 277–284. doi:10.1016/J.APPET.2011.10.005. hdl:2066/102707. PMID 22037008. S2CID 205608974.
- Beijers, Roseriet; Jansen, Jarno; Riksen-Walraven, Marianne; De Weerth, Carolina (2010-10-08). "Nonparental care and infant health: do number of hours and number of concurrent arrangements matter?" (PDF). Early Human Development. 87 (1): 9–15. doi:10.1016/J.EARLHUMDEV.2010.09.003. PMID 20934281.
- Jansen, Jarno; Beijers, Roseriet; Riksen-Walraven, Marianne; De Weerth, Carolina (2010-07-28). "Does maternal care-giving behavior modulate the cortisol response to an acute stressor in 5-week-old human infants?" (PDF). Stress. 13 (6): 491–497. doi:10.3109/10253890.2010.483298. PMID 20666643. S2CID 5482125.
- Beijers, Roseriet; Jansen, Jarno; Riksen-Walraven, Marianne; De Weerth, Carolina (2010-07-19). "Maternal prenatal anxiety and stress predict infant illnesses and health complaints" (PDF). Pediatrics. 126 (2): e401-9. doi:10.1542/PEDS.2009-3226. PMID 20643724. S2CID 2560717.
- Tollenaar, Marieke S.; Jansen, Jarno; Beijers, Roseriet; Riksen-Walraven, J. Marianne; De Weerth, Carolina (2010-01-06). "Cortisol in the first year of life: normative values and intra-individual variability" (PDF). Early Human Development. 86 (1): 13–16. doi:10.1016/J.EARLHUMDEV.2009.12.003. PMID 20051312.
- Jansen, Jarno; Beijers, Roseriet; Riksen-Walraven, Marianne; De Weerth, Carolina (2009-08-03). "Cortisol reactivity in young infants" (PDF). Psychoneuroendocrinology. 35 (3): 329–338. doi:10.1016/J.PSYNEUEN.2009.07.008. PMID 19651476. S2CID 37645691.
- De Bloom, Jessica; Kompier, Michiel; Geurts, Sabine; De Weerth, Carolina; Taris, Toon; Sonnentag, Sabine (2008-12-19). "Do we recover from vacation? Meta-analysis of vacation effects on health and well-being". Journal of Occupational Health. 51 (1): 13–25. doi:10.1539/JOH.K8004. hdl:2066/76925. PMID 19096200.
- Albers, Esther M.; Marianne Riksen-Walraven, J.; Sweep, Fred C.G.J.; De Weerth, Carolina (2008-01-01). "Maternal behavior predicts infant cortisol recovery from a mild everyday stressor". The Journal of Child Psychology and Psychiatry. 49 (1): 97–103. doi:10.1111/J.1469-7610.2007.01818.X. PMID 18181883.
- De Weerth, Carolina; Buitelaar, Jan K. (2007-03-30). "Childbirth complications affect young infants' behavior". European Child & Adolescent Psychiatry. 16 (6): 379–388. doi:10.1007/S00787-007-0610-7. PMID 17401610.
- De Weerth, Carolina; Buitelaar, Jan K. (2005-10-01). "Cortisol awakening response in pregnant women". Psychoneuroendocrinology. 30 (9): 902–907. doi:10.1016/J.PSYNEUEN.2005.05.003. PMID 15970390. S2CID 29400353.
- Gutteling, Barbara M.; De Weerth, Carolina; Buitelaar, Jan K. (2005-07-01). "Prenatal stress and children's cortisol reaction to the first day of school" (PDF). Psychoneuroendocrinology. 30 (6): 541–549. doi:10.1016/J.PSYNEUEN.2005.01.002. PMID 15808923. S2CID 5522247.
- De Weerth, Carolina; Buitelaar, Jan K. (2005-04-01). "Physiological stress reactivity in human pregnancy--a review". Neuroscience & Biobehavioral Reviews. 29 (2): 295–312. doi:10.1016/J.NEUBIOREV.2004.10.005. hdl:2066/49165. PMID 15811500. S2CID 965573.
- Gutteling, Barbara M.; De Weerth, Carolina; Willemsen-Swinkels, Sophie H. N.; Huizink, Anja C.; Mulder, Eduard J. H.; Visser, Gerard H. A.; Buitelaar, Jan K. (2005-02-01). "The effects of prenatal stress on temperament and problem behavior of 27-month-old toddlers" (PDF). European Child & Adolescent Psychiatry. 14 (1): 41–51. doi:10.1007/S00787-005-0435-1. PMID 15756515. S2CID 22170605.
- Gutteling, B. M.; De Weerth, C.; Buitelaar, J. K. (2004-12-01). "Maternal prenatal stress and 4-6 year old children's salivary cortisol concentrations pre- and post-vaccination" (PDF). Stress. 7 (4): 257–260. doi:10.1080/10253890500044521. hdl:2066/54819. PMID 16019591. S2CID 38412082.
- De Weerth, Carolina; Van Hees, Yvonne; Buitelaar, Jan K. (2003-11-01). "Prenatal maternal cortisol levels and infant behavior during the first 5 months" (PDF). Early Human Development. 74 (2): 139–151. doi:10.1016/S0378-3782(03)00088-4. hdl:2066/63167. PMID 14580753. S2CID 14382104.
- De Weerth, Carolina; Zijl, Robbert H.; Buitelaar, Jan K. (2003-08-01). "Development of cortisol circadian rhythm in infancy". Early Human Development. 73 (1–2): 39–52. doi:10.1016/S0378-3782(03)00074-4. PMID 12932892.
- Thijssen, Jos H H.; Buitelaar, Jan K.; Graat, Gerard; De Weerth, Carolina (2003-04-01). "Measurement of cortisol in small quantities of saliva". Clinical Chemistry. 49 (4): 658–660. doi:10.1373/49.4.658. PMID 12651822.
