= Jim Bakkum =

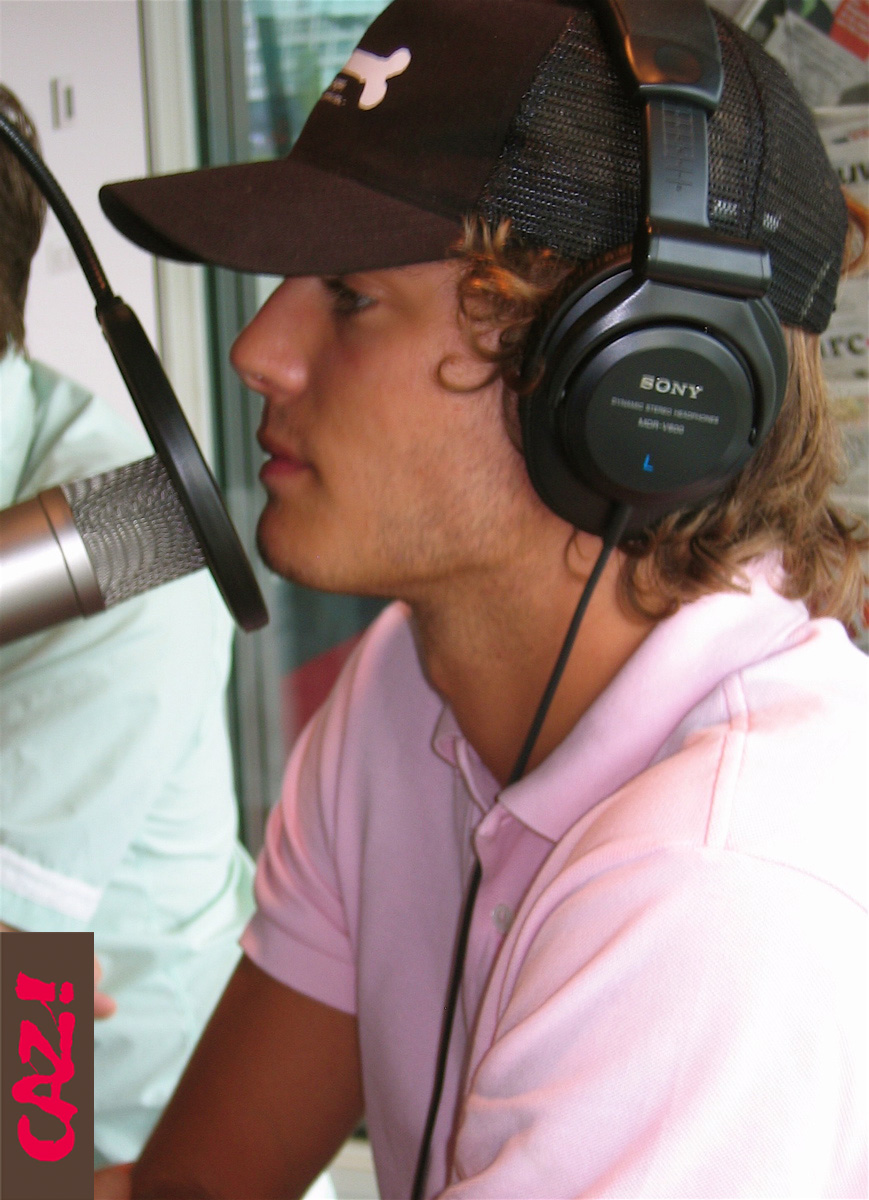

Background information
- Born: Jimmy Johannes Bakkum; 10 August 1987 (age 39); Egmond-Binnen, Netherlands
- Genres: Pop, dance
- Occupations: Singer, actor, stage actor
- Instrument: Vocals
- Years active: 2003–present

Jimmy Johannes Bakkum (born 10 August 1987) is a Dutch singer, actor, stage actor and television personality. Rising to nationwide fame after becoming runner-up in the first season of Dutch singing competition series Idols, he has released five albums and made a career in musicals and film. In television, he appeared in a Dutch version of Dancing with the Stars, which he won.

== Career ==
As a child, Bakkum was encouraged to sing and act by his parents. He started a band with his older brother Danny and also performed in amateur theatre productions. In 2002, his brother suggested that he audition for the Dutch TV talent programme Idols. He became the youngest contestant at 15 years of age.

After coming second in the competition, he was signed by Wilde Productions and released his first single "Tell Her" in May 2003. The song charted at #1 in the Netherlands. His second single, "This Love Is Real" which is a cover of the original song by CB Milton (he was also signed to Wilde Productions) was released in July 2003 where it reached the top 3. Shortly after Jim's 16th birthday, in August 2003 he released his debut album Impressed; this reached #1 in the Dutch album charts and reached gold status (40,000 copies sold).

In April 2004, Bakkum was nominated for 2 TMF awards; Best Newcomer and Best Singer. He won the Best Newcomer award. His second album Ready was released in May 2004 and reached the Top 10 of the Dutch Album Charts.

In 2005, he won Dancing with the Stars (the Dutch version of Strictly Come Dancing), partnered by Julie Fryer. His third album, Dance With Me was released in November by his new record company CMM (Corbeau Music Masters). This album came out of his dancing experience on the TV show and also reached gold (40,000 copies sold).

Also in 2005, he played the voice of Hippix in the animated film Asterix and the Vikings, which went on general release in Europe and Canada in early 2006. In April, he released a single of the soundtrack, "Dapper & Sterk" (meaning: "Brave and Strong"), which charted at #13 and stayed for months in the Dutch single charts.

In the beginning of 2006, Bakkum played his first big role in a TV series, called BOKS, which is a police series in which he played the role of Willem Jongbloed, a young policeman just out of the police academy. From October 2006, Bakkum toured throughout the Netherlands in the leading role of Danny Zuko in the musical Grease.

In the spring of 2007, he hosted the TV show De weg naar Fame ("The Way to Fame") in which the leading roles of the musical Fame were selected. Bakkum already had the role of Nick Piazza, so in the show he guided the contestants and also hosted the show.

In May 2007, he released his new single "Doe dit, doe dat" which entered the charts at #5. His new album Vrij! was released in late June 2007 followed by the third single "Doe maar gewoon" in September 2007. He was nominated again for a TMF Award for Best Dutch Singer.

In the fall of 2007, Bakkum toured with his show 'Jim in Concert' through various Dutch theaters before he started the role of Nick Piazza in the musical Fame as of January 2008.

From January 2008, Bakkum played the role of Robin in the internet-only soap 2000Antwerp, aired daily on the Belgian MyVideo.

In April 2008, the single "Doe dit doe dat" was released in Belgium (Flanders).

In January 2011, it was announced that Bakkum would be starring as the character of Fiyero in the Dutch production of the musical Wicked, which was set to open in autumn of 2011 at the Circus Theatre in Scheveningen.

In March 2011, Bakkum released the song "Feel Your Love". The single was his first English one since 2007.

In 2025, Bakkum and Marieke Elsinga presented the talent television show The Headliner.

== Personal life ==
While on tour with the 2006 Dutch production of Grease, he met actress Bettina Holwerda, who is 8 years his senior. They began dating shortly after both were admitted to hospital after an accident on stage in which a prop car that they were both in fell 12 ft into the orchestra pit. In a June 2007 interview, Bakkum claimed to have a weakness for strong older women. He proposed to Holwerda on 22 September 2010 and they were married in the Amsterdam Vondelkerk (Vondel Church) on Friday 10 June 2011. Their son Lux was born in November 2012 and daughter Posy was born in March 2015. The family used to live in Amsterdam but moved to Naarden in 2015.

== Discography ==
=== Albums ===
| Year | Album details | Chart positions | Certifications (sales thresholds) |
| Year | Album details | Netherlands | Certifications (sales thresholds) |
|---|---|---|---|
| 2003 | Impressed: Released: August 2003; Label: BMG; Formats: CD | 1 | Gold (x40,000) |
| 2004 | Ready: Released: May 2004; Label: BMG; Formats: CD | 24 | None |
| 2005 | Dance With Me: Released: April 2005; Label: CMM; Formats: CD | 10 | Gold (x40,000) |
| 2007 | Vrij: Released: June 2007; Label: CMM; Formats: CD | 23 | None |
| 2009 | Nu: Released: May 2009; Label: CMM; Formats: CD | 26 | None |

== Theater/musical ==
- Wonderlijke Efteling Show: (2004)
- Grease: Danny Zuko (2006-2007)
- Fame: Nick Piazza (2007-2008)
- Hairspray: Link Larkin (2009-2010)
- Wicked: Fiyero (2011-2013)
- Flashdance: Nick (2013-2014)
- Hartsvrienden (Blood Brothers): Edward (2015)
- Musicals in Concert - Live on Tour: (2017)

== Filmography ==
- Asterix and the Vikings (voice only)
- Keep Off
- Verliefd op Ibiza
- Rokjesdag
- Onze Jongens
- Men at Work: Miami (Onze Jongens in Miami)
- Casanova's
- Just Say Yes
- Liefde Zonder Grenzen
- Loving Bali
- Afblijven

== See also ==
- Dancing with the Stars

| Preceded by None | Dancing With The Stars winner Season 1 (2005 with Julie Fryer) | Succeeded by Barbara de Loor & Marcus van Teijlingen |
