= Juf Braaksel en de geniale ontsnapping =

2024 Dutch film directed by Aram van de Rest

- Film poster
- Directed by: Aram van de Rest
- Starring: Nicolette van Dam; Djamila; Juvat Westendorp
- Distributed by: Splendid Film
- Release date: 11 December 2024
- Country: Netherlands
- Language: Dutch

Juf Braaksel en de geniale ontsnapping is a 2024 Dutch children's film directed by Aram van de Rest. The film is based on the book of the same name by Carry Slee. The film won the Golden Film award after having sold 100,000 tickets. It is the sequel to the 2023 film Juf Braaksel en de magische ring.

Nicolette van Dam, Djamila and Juvat Westendorp play roles in the film. Van Dam plays the lead role of Juf Braaksel.

The film is the tenth film based on one of Carry Slee's books to win the Golden Film award. She is the first Dutch children's writer with this number of Golden Film awards based on her books. In total, just over 226,000 tickets were sold in 2024 and 2025.

The 2025 sequel Juf Braaksel en de mysterieuze verdwijning also won the Golden Film award after having sold 100,000 tickets.
