= Broken (2023 film) =

2023 Dutch film directed by Ben Verbong

- Theatrical release poster
- Directed by: Ben Verbong
- Screenplay by: Ben Verbong; Sytze van der Laan; Ger Beukenkamp
- Based on: Toen ik je zag: mijn leven by Isa Hoes
- Produced by: Denis Wigman; Marijn Wigman
- Starring: Noortje Herlaar; Egbert-Jan Weeber
- Cinematography: Lex Brand
- Edited by: Stanley Kolk
- Music by: Jorrit Kleijnen; Jacob Meijer
- Production companies: Nuts & Bolts Film Company
- Distributed by: Dutch FilmWorks
- Release date: 2 March 2023
- Running time: 118 minutes
- Country: Netherlands
- Language: Dutch
- Box office: $1,323,818

Broken (Dutch: Toen ik je zag) is a 2023 Dutch drama film directed by Ben Verbong. The film won the Golden Film award after having sold 100,000 tickets.

The film tells the story of the romance between Isa Hoes and Antonie Kamerling as well as the events and circumstances leading up to Kamerling's suicide. In the film, the characters are called Esther and Bastiaan and they are played by Noortje Herlaar and Egbert-Jan Weeber.

The film is based on the 2013 book Toen ik je zag: mijn leven met Antonie written by Isa Hoes. The title is a reference to Kamerling's most successful hitsong Toen ik je zag which back in 1997 spent five weeks at the number 1 spot of the Dutch Top 40.
