= Men at Work 2 =

2020 Dutch film directed by Johan Nijenhuis

Men at Work: Miami
- Theatrical release poster
- Directed by: Johan Nijenhuis
- Screenplay by: Annelou Verboon
- Produced by: Johan Nijenhuis; Ingmar Menning
- Starring: Jim Bakkum; Martijn Fischer; Juvat Westendorp
- Cinematography: Maarten van Keller
- Edited by: Elsbeth Kasteel
- Music by: Martijn Schimmer
- Production companies: Johan Nijenhuis & Co; AVROTROS
- Distributed by: Dutch FilmWorks
- Release date: 30 January 2020
- Running time: 115 minutes
- Country: Netherlands
- Languages: Dutch; English
- Box office: $2,938,336

Men at Work: Miami (Dutch: Onze Jongens in Miami) is a 2020 Dutch comedy film directed by Johan Nijenhuis. The film is the sequel to the 2016 film Men at Work. It won the Golden Film award after having sold 100,000 tickets. It was the second highest-grossing Dutch film of 2020. It was also the third best visited Dutch film of 2020.

The 2025 sequel film Onze Jongens 3 also won the Golden Film award.

== Plot ==
Jorrit (Jim Bakkum) and Bas (Martijn Fischer) decide to open a strip club in Miami. Together with Thijs (Juvat Westendorp) and Boris (Malik Mohammed) they begin work to renovate the club and to earn money by performing as strippers themselves.

== Cast ==
- Jim Bakkum as Jorrit
- Martijn Fischer as Bas
- Juvat Westendorp as Thijs
- Eva van de Wijdeven as Lola
- Malik Mohammed as Boris
- Isadora Cruz as a vlogger
