= Juvat Westendorp =

Dutch dancer, choreographer and actor

- Born: 31 January 1989 (age 37)
- Occupations: Dancer; Choreographer; Actor

Juvat Westendorp (born 31 January 1989) is a Dutch dancer, choreographer and actor. He starred in the films Men at Work: Miami (2020), Silverstar (2022) and Happy Single (2023). He also played a small role in the soap opera Goede tijden, slechte tijden.

== Career ==
=== Film and television ===
Westendorp played a role in the soap series Malaika, a television series about people who work in healthcare. In 2015, he played a small role in the soap opera Goede tijden, slechte tijden. He left the show after two months and his character Ardil Baydar died in the show. In 2017 and 2018, he played a role in the soap series De Spa which takes place at a luxury wellness center.

He played a lead role in the 2018 film Nachtwacht: De poort der zielen directed by Gert-Jan Booy.

Westendorp starred in the 2020 comedy films Men at Work: Miami directed by Johan Nijenhuis and Casanova's directed by Jamel Aattache. Both films won the Golden Film award after having sold 100,000 tickets. He also played lead roles in the 2022 adventure film Silverstar directed by Diede in 't Veld and the 2023 romantic comedy film Happy Single directed by Anna van Keimpema. These films won the Golden Film award. Westendorp played a role in the 2023 children's film Juf Braaksel en de magische ring and the 2024 children's film Juf Braaksel en de geniale ontsnapping which both also won the Golden Film award. Both films are based on books written by Carry Slee. He also played a role in the 2025 film Juf Braaksel en de mysterieuze verdwijning. Westendorp plays a role in the 2026 film Undercurrent directed by Klaas de Jong.

As of September 2025, he is scheduled to appear in the 2026 film Chateau Moordland.

=== Television appearances ===
Westendorp was one of the contestants in the fourth season of the Dutch-Belgian version of So You Think You Can Dance in which contestants compete in dance. He was eliminated in the semi-finals. In 2012, he was one of the contestants in De Nationale IQ Test.

He won the 2018 boxing television show Boxing Stars in the men's heavyweight weight class. He was one of the jury members in the 2019 season of the television show Superkids, a television show in which children compete in music, dance or other areas.

In 2019 and 2020, Westendorp competed in the television show Dancing on Ice. He finished in second place. In 2021, he appeared in the photography television show Het Perfecte Plaatje in which contestants compete to create the best photo in various challenges. He was eliminated just before reaching the final.

Westendorp performed as drag queen Alexis Star in the 2022 season of the drag queen show Make up your Mind. In that same year, he appeared as drag queen Miss Contessa at the Gouden Televizier-Ring Gala. Wolter Kroes was supposed to perform at the event but he was unable to do so due to an injury.

=== Dance ===
He founded the Juvat Performing Arts Studios in Zaandam, Netherlands.

== Personal life ==
Since 2015, he is ambassador for Stichting Het Vergeten Kind. In 2023, he appeared on the cover of the Dutch edition of Men's Health magazine.

== Selected filmography ==
=== Film ===
- Gooische Vrouwen 2 (2014)
- Nachtwacht: De poort der zielen (2018)
- Men at Work: Miami (2020)
- Casanova's (2020)
- Just Say Yes (2021)
- Niks Vreemds Aan (2021)
- F*ck Love Too (2022)
- Boeien! (2022)
- Silverstar (2022)
- Happy Single (2023)
- Juf Braaksel en de magische ring (2023)
- De Break-Up Club (2024)
- Juf Braaksel en de geniale ontsnapping (2024)
- Juf Braaksel en de mysterieuze verdwijning (2025)
- Undercurrent (2026, original title: EB)
- Juf Braaksel en het Meesterbrein (2026, upcoming)
- Chateau Moordland (2026, upcoming)

=== Television ===
- Malaika (2013)
- Goede tijden, slechte tijden (2015)
- De Spa (2017, 2018)

=== As jury member ===
- Superkids (2019)

=== As contestant ===
- So You Think You Can Dance (2011)
- De Nationale IQ Test (2012)
- Boxing Stars (2018)
- Dancing on Ice (2019, 2020)
- Het Perfecte Plaatje (2021)
- Make up your Mind (2022)
- Shaolin Heroes (Videoland, 2025)
- A Beautiful Mess (NPO Start, 2026)
- De Meestergids (2026)
