= Silverstar (film) =

2022 Dutch film directed by Diede in 't Veld

- Theatrical release poster
- Directed by: Diede in 't Veld
- Screenplay by: Michiel Peereboom
- Produced by: Edvard van 't Wout
- Starring: Britt Dekker; Wendy Ruijfrok; Juvat Westendorp; Bo Maerten; Anneke Blok
- Cinematography: Ties Versteegh
- Edited by: Jeffrey De Vore
- Music by: Karl Heortweard
- Production company: 2CFILM
- Distributed by: Dutch FilmWorks
- Release date: 13 July 2022
- Country: Netherlands
- Language: Dutch

Silverstar is a 2022 Dutch adventure film directed by Diede in 't Veld. The film won the Golden Film award after having sold 100,000 tickets. The film is the sequel to the 2019 film Whitestar.

Principal photography began in August 2021. Britt Dekker and Juvat Westendorp play roles in the film.

It was the 15th best visited Dutch film of 2022 with just over 97,000 visitors.

== See also ==
- List of films about horses
