= Nicolette van Dam =

Dutch actress, model and television host

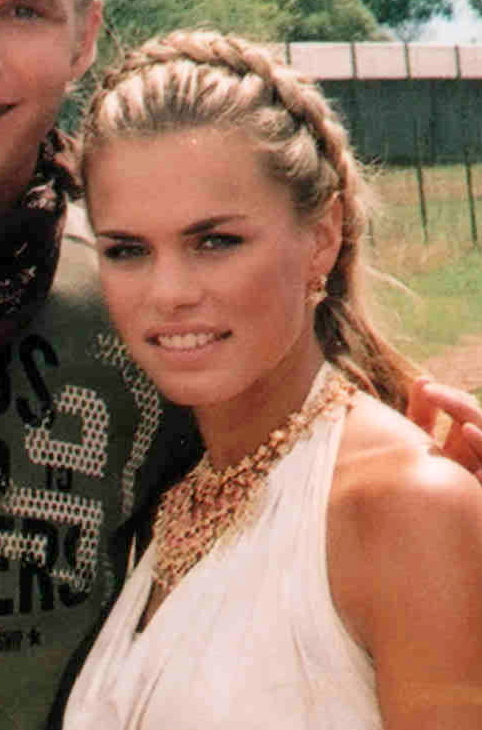
- Nicolette van Dam in 2006
- Born: Nicolette Helena Elizabeth van Dam; 14 August 1984 (age 41); Amsterdam, Netherlands
- Occupations: Actress, television presenter, model
- Years active: 2001–present

Nicolette van Dam (born 14 August 1984) is a Dutch actress, model and television host.

== Biography ==
Nicolette van Dam was born in Amsterdam in 1984. After finishing high school at the havo level at the age of 18, van Dam went to study at HBO. She didn't finish her study—instead, she was discovered and became a model. After appearing in several video clips, van Dam got the role of the conceited Bionda in the kids soap ZOOP, which was aired on the Dutch Nickelodeon. In 2005, the first movie about the show was released in Dutch theaters: Zoop in Africa The movie was followed by Zoop in India (2006). In 2007 the film Zoop in South-America was released in the Netherlands. For the second Zoop movie, van Dam sang Jadoo Jadoo, which was listed at the Kids Top 20. She was also nominated for a Golden Calf for her role in the second film.

After having guest starred in the series Van Speijk in 2006, van Dam presented the reality show Pimp my Room. Her next credit as a presenter, was for the kids show Jetix Max, which is aired every Sunday on the Dutch network Jetix.

Van Dam also appeared in the movies Deuce Bigalow: European Gigolo and Plop in de Stad, dubbed a voice in Ice Age: The Meltdown and had a guest role in one of the most successful investigation series of the Netherlands; Baantjer.

From March 2007 to November 2009, van Dam had a role in the successful comedy series Voetbalvrouwen.

In 2016, Van Dam hosted, together with Tim Douwsma, the SBS6 competition show The Next Boy/Girl Band.

She plays a lead role in the 2023 film Juf Braaksel en de magische ring directed by Aram van de Rest. She also plays a lead role in the 2024 film Juf Braaksel en de geniale ontsnapping.

== Twitter incident ==
On 18 June 2014, during the 2014 FIFA World Cup, Nicolette van Dam tweeted a photo-shopped mock-up of Colombia national team members James Rodríguez and Radamel Falcao snorting vanishing foam with the caption "Colombian wall", making an allusion of snorting cocaine. The post was removed soon afterwards, followed by an apology stating "Queridos Colombianos, there was no offense intended from my side. Please accept my honest and sincere apologies".

Colombian Minister of Foreign Affairs María Ángela Holguín spoke out against Van Dam, saying "This is not the first time that she has put out a disparaging tweet, and Colombia will not accept this". Holguín proceeded to request Colombian ambassador in the Netherlands, Eduardo Pizarro Leongómez, to go to the chancellery of said country in search for more severe consequences to Van Dam's "disrespect towards Colombia". As a consequence of the incident, Van Dam resigned her position as UNICEF Goodwill Ambassador.
