= Costa!! =

2022 Dutch film directed by Jon Karthaus

- Theatrical release poster
- Directed by: Jon Karthaus
- Screenplay by: Jon Karthaus
- Produced by: Ronald Versteeg; Sabine Brian
- Cinematography: Max Maloney
- Edited by: Joshua Menco
- Music by: Guido Maat
- Production companies: NL Film & TV; Interstellar Pictures
- Distributed by: Dutch FilmWorks
- Release date: 28 April 2022
- Running time: 101 minutes
- Country: Netherlands
- Language: Dutch

Costa!! is a 2022 Dutch comedy-drama film directed by Jon Karthaus. The film is not a sequel to the 2001 film Costa! but it takes place in the same location and has Katja Schuurman as the only original cast member. Karthaus and Diederik Jekel wrote the script of the film. It was the third best visited Dutch film of 2022 with just over 260,000 visitors.

The film won the Golden Film award after having sold 100,000 tickets. Besides Schuurman, Abbey Hoes and Tina de Bruin are among the cast members.

Soy Kroon and Abbey Hoes released the song Samen Met Jou, as can be heard in the film, about a week after the film's release after popular demand.

The film was announced in December 2018. Principal photography took place from August to October 2021.
