= Neem me mee =

2023 Dutch film directed by Will Koopman

- Theatrical release poster
- Directed by: Will Koopman
- Screenplay by: Frank Houtappels
- Story by: Anthony van Biervliet
- Starring: Jeroen Krabbé; Renée Soutendijk; Kees Hulst; Olga Zuiderhoek; Minnie Koole; Helen Kamperveen; Geert de Jong
- Cinematography: Piotr Kukla
- Edited by: Imre Reutelingsperger
- Music by: Alexander Reumers
- Production companies: NL Film & TV; Interstellar Pictures; Dingie; Black Sheep Films
- Distributed by: Dutch FilmWorks
- Release date: 11 December 2023
- Countries: Netherlands; Belgium
- Language: Dutch
- Box office: $1,876,079

Neem me mee (stylised as Neem Me Mee) is a 2023 Dutch comedy film directed by Will Koopman. The film won the Golden Film award after having sold 100,000 tickets. In total, just over 195,000 tickets were sold in 2023 and 2024.

Jeroen Krabbé, Renée Soutendijk and Olga Zuiderhoek play a role in the film. Kees Hulst, Helen Kamperveen and Geert de Jong also play a role in the film.

== Cast ==
- Jeroen Krabbé as Joep
- Renée Soutendijk as Nienke
- Kees Hulst as Anton
- Olga Zuiderhoek as Mabel
- Minnie Koole as Thijs
- Helen Kamperveen as Florri
- Geert de Jong as Susanne
