= Tirza =

2010 film

- Theatrical release poster
- Directed by: Rudolf van den Berg
- Written by: Rudolf van den Berg
- Based on: Tirza by Arnon Grunberg
- Produced by: Jeroen Koolbergen; San Fu Maltha
- Starring: Gijs Scholten van Aschat; Sylvia Hoeks; Johanna ter Steege
- Cinematography: Gábor Szabó
- Edited by: Job ter Burg
- Music by: Bob Zimmerman
- Production companies: Fu Works; Cadenza Films; Omroep NTR
- Distributed by: Independent Films
- Release dates: 22 September 2010 (Netherlands Film Festival); 30 September 2010
- Running time: 95 minutes
- Country: Netherlands
- Language: Dutch
- Box office: $1,666,437

Tirza is a 2010 Dutch drama film written and directed by Rudolf van den Berg, based on the Dutch bestseller of the same name by Arnon Grunberg. The film was selected as the Dutch entry for the Best Foreign Language Film at the 83rd Academy Awards but it didn't make the final shortlist.

== Cast ==
- Gijs Scholten van Aschat as Jörgen
- Sylvia Hoeks as Tirza
- Johanna ter Steege as Alma
- Abbey Hoes as Ibi
- Titia Hoogendoorn as Ester
- Nasrdin Dchar as Choukri
- Keitumetse Matlabo as Kaisa

== Production ==
In retrospect, Abbey Hoes thinks she "should not have done" some of the nude scenes she has done in the past. "I've been on mokkels.nl since I was fourteen because of my role in the film Tirza." The actress tells in conversation with a magazine that there are people who think that "it's part of the game" if you are an actress. "But I don't think being on a dirty porn site is part of the job. If I had wanted that, I would have become a porn actress."

== Release ==
=== Home media ===
The film was released on DVD and Blu-ray by Warner Home Video on 23 March 2011.

== See also ==
- List of submissions to the 83rd Academy Awards for Best Foreign Language Film
- List of Dutch submissions for the Academy Award for Best Foreign Language Film
