= Juf Braaksel en de magische ring =

2023 Dutch film directed by Aram van de Rest

- Film poster
- Directed by: Aram van de Rest
- Starring: Nicolette van Dam; Djamila; Kraantje Pappie
- Distributed by: Splendid Film
- Release date: 20 December 2023
- Country: Netherlands
- Language: Dutch

Juf Braaksel en de magische ring is a 2023 Dutch children's film directed by Aram van de Rest. The film is based on the book of the same name by Carry Slee. The film won the Golden Film award after having sold 100,000 tickets. It was the first Golden Film award of 2024. In total, just over 240,000 tickets were sold in 2023 and 2024.

Principal photography began in July 2023. Filming took place at the Amalia Astro elementary school in Baarn, Netherlands. Nicolette van Dam, Djamila and Kraantje Pappie play roles in the film. Van Dam plays the lead role of Juf Braaksel. Juvat Westendorp also plays a role in the film.

The 2024 sequel Juf Braaksel en de geniale ontsnapping also won the Golden Film award.
