= Hotel Sinestra =

2022 Dutch film directed by Michiel ten Horn

- Theatrical release poster
- Directed by: Michiel ten Horn
- Distributed by: Dutch FilmWorks
- Release date: 14 December 2022
- Country: Netherlands
- Language: Dutch

Hotel Sinestra is a 2022 Dutch family film directed by Michiel ten Horn. The film won the Golden Film award, having sold 100,000 tickets. It was the first Golden Film award of 2023.

Elise Schaap, Jeroen Spitzenberger and Bobbie Mulder play lead roles in the film. Swiss actor Daniel Rohr also plays a role in the film. Principal photography took place in early 2022. The film takes place at a hotel in Val Sinestra, a valley of the Swiss Alps. The film was also released in Swiss cinemas.
