= Martijn Fischer =

Dutch actor (born 1968)

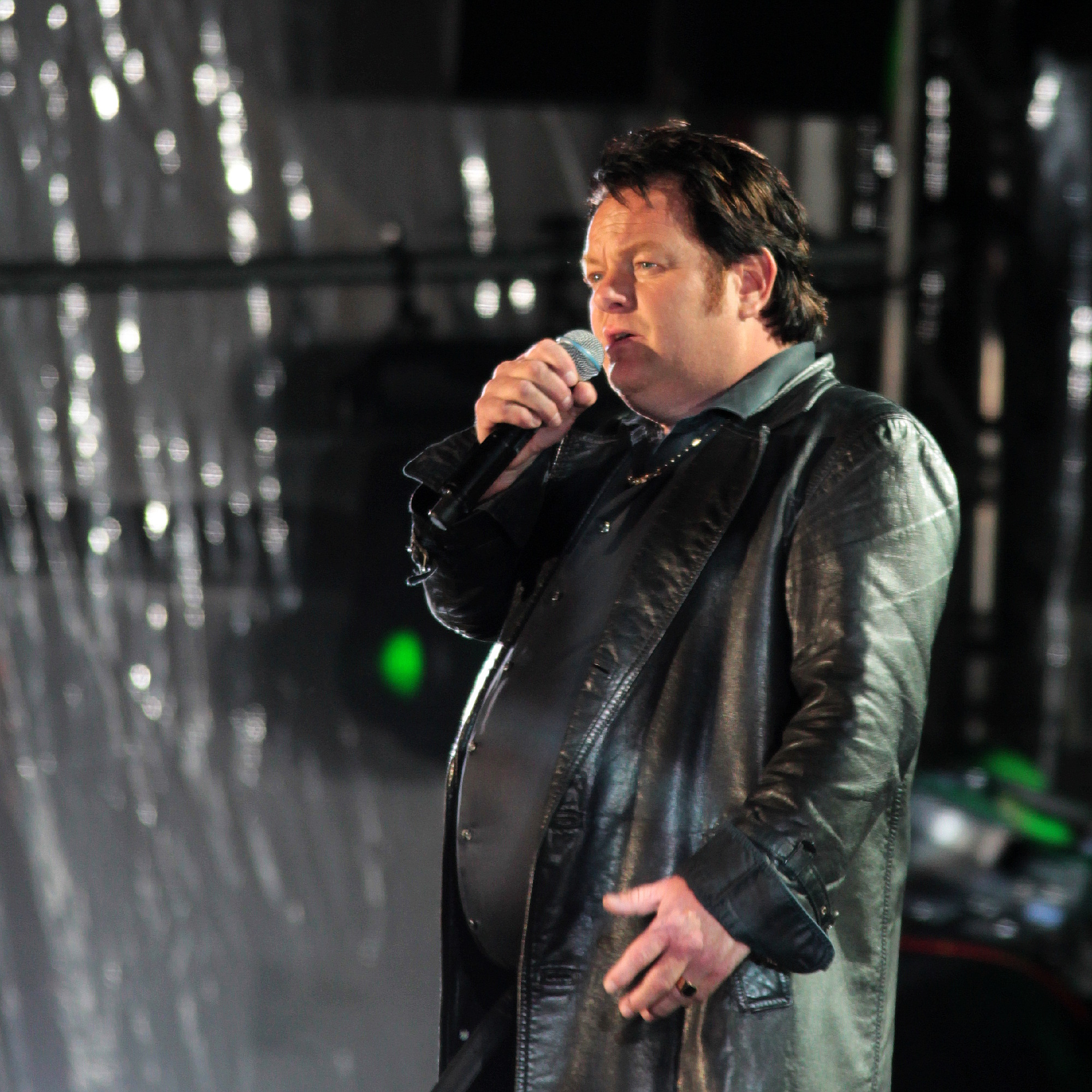
- Martijn Fischer (2014) playing André Hazes
- Born: 28 January 1968 (age 58); Utrecht, Netherlands

Martijn Fischer (born 28 January 1968) is a Dutch actor.

== Career ==
In 2015, he won the Golden Calf for Best Actor award for playing the Dutch singer André Hazes in the film Bloed, zweet & tranen. Hadewych Minis won the Golden Calf for Best Supporting Actress and Raymond Thiry won the Golden Calf for Best Supporting Actor for their roles in the film.

In 2016, he played the role of Jesus in The Passion.

He played a lead role in the 2018 film Mannen van Mars.

== Awards ==
- 2015: Golden Calf for Best Actor, Bloed, zweet & tranen

== Selected filmography ==
- 2003: Love to Love
- 2004: Floris
- 2006: Keep Off
- 2007: De Scheepsjongens van Bontekoe
- 2015: Bloed, zweet & tranen
- 2018: Redbad
- 2020: Men at Work: Miami
- 2025: Onze Jongens 3
