= The Expedition of the Family Fox =

2021 Dutch film

- Directed by: Bob Wilbers
- Written by: Bob Römer; Nienke Römer
- Starring: Anna Drijver; Fockeline Ouwerkerk
- Cinematography: Goof de Kooning
- Edited by: Michelle Hofman
- Music by: Guido Heeneman
- Distributed by: Just Film Distribution
- Release date: 11 February 2021
- Running time: 71 minutes
- Country: Netherlands
- Language: Dutch
- Box office: $55,287

The Expedition of the Family Fox (Dutch: De expeditie van de familie Vos) is a 2021 Dutch family film directed by Bob Wilbers. The film was entirely shot in the Dutch amusement park De Efteling. The film premiered at the Molodist International Film Festival in Kyiv. The film was put on a shortlist of 22 films eligible for the Golden Calves, an award often called the Dutch equivalent of the Oscars.

== Plot ==
A recently deceased grandfather leaves a scavenger hunt for a young boy to follow.

== Reception ==
Dutch newspaper De Telegraaf found it a shame that the film suffered from the Coronacrisis and therefore didn't get as big of a movie theatre release as it deserved.

CineMagazine rated it 3 stars.
