= Liefde Zonder Grenzen =

2021 Dutch film

- Film poster
- Directed by: Appie Boudellah; Aram van de Rest
- Distributed by: Splendid Film
- Release date: 11 October 2021 (Netherlands)
- Running time: 95 minutes
- Country: Netherlands
- Language: Dutch

Liefde Zonder Grenzen is a 2021 Dutch romantic comedy film directed by Appie Boudellah and Aram van de Rest. The film won the Golden Film award after having sold 100,000 tickets.

Jim Bakkum, Yolanthe Cabau and Abbey Hoes are among the cast of the film.
