= My Best Friend Anne Frank =

2021 Dutch film directed by Ben Sombogaart

- Theatrical release poster
- Directed by: Ben Sombogaart
- Based on: Memories of Anne Frank: Reflections of a Childhood Friend by Alison Leslie Gold
- Starring: Aiko Beemsterboer; Josephine Arendsen
- Edited by: Herman P. Koerts
- Distributed by: Dutch FilmWorks (Netherlands); Netflix (International)
- Release date: 9 September 2021
- Running time: 103 minutes
- Country: Netherlands
- Languages: Dutch; German

My Best Friend Anne Frank (Dutch: Mijn beste vriendin Anne Frank) is a 2021 Dutch biographical drama film directed by Ben Sombogaart. The film tells the story of the friendship between Hanneli Goslar and Anne Frank and the story is told from Goslar's perspective. The film is based on Memories of Anne Frank: Reflections of a Childhood Friend written by American author Alison Leslie Gold. It is the first Dutch cinema film about the life of Anne Frank. Aiko Beemsterboer plays the role of Anne Frank and Josephine Arendsen plays the role of Hanneli Goslar.

The film won the Golden Film award in October 2021 after having sold 100,000 tickets.

== Plot ==
The film's plot focuses primarily on the friendship between two girls, Hannah Goslar and Anne Frank, who try to enjoy a carefree childhood in Amsterdam despite the restrictions on their freedom imposed by the Nazis. One day, Anne disappears along with her family – supposedly to neutral Switzerland. Just a year later, in June 1943, Hannah, her father Hans Goslar, and her sister Gabi are deported to the Bergen-Belsen concentration camp. There, in the winter of 1944/45, Hannah and Anne Frank have a surprising encounter.

== Cast ==
- Aiko Beemsterboer as Anne Frank
- Josephine Arendsen as Hanneli Goslar
- Stefan de Walle as Otto Frank
- Zsolt Trill as Fritz
- Björn Freiberg as Officer Bruno
- Lottie Hellingman as Ruth Judith Goslar

== Production ==
Part of the film was filmed in Hungary. Principal photography was halted due to the COVID-19 pandemic.

== Release ==
Netflix distributed the film internationally with it premiering on February 1, 2022.

== Reception ==
It is rated as 63% on Rotten Tomatoes.
