= Casanova's =

2020 Dutch film directed by Jamel Aattache

- Film poster
- Directed by: Jamel Aattache
- Starring: Tygo Gernandt; Jim Bakkum; Lieke van Lexmond
- Distributed by: Just Film Distribution
- Release date: 5 October 2020 (Netherlands)
- Running time: 93 minutes
- Country: Netherlands
- Language: Dutch

Casanova's is a 2020 Dutch comedy film directed by Jamel Aattache. The film won the Golden Film award after having sold 100,000 tickets. It was the sixth highest-grossing Dutch film of 2020. It was also the seventh best visited Dutch film of 2020.

Tygo Gernandt, Jim Bakkum and Lieke van Lexmond play roles in the film. Juvat Westendorp also plays a role in the film. Principal photography began in June 2020 in Rotterdam, Netherlands. The title song of the film was made by the band Re-Play. The song is an adaptation of the song Casanova by Ultimate Kaos.
