= De Allergrootste Slijmfilm =

2022 Dutch film directed by Martijn Smits

- Theatrical release poster
- Directed by: Martijn Smits
- Starring: Bibi; Yolanthe Cabau; Ferdi Stofmeel
- Distributed by: Splendid Film
- Release date: 6 July 2022
- Running time: 81 minutes
- Country: Netherlands
- Language: Dutch

De Allergrootste Slijmfilm (lit. 'The Greatest Slime Film') is a 2022 Dutch adventure film directed by Martijn Smits. The film won the Golden Film award after having sold 100,000 tickets. It was the fifth best visited Dutch film of 2022 with just over 215,000 visitors. The film is the sequel to the 2021 film De Nog Grotere Slijmfilm, which is also directed by Martijn Smits.

The film was announced in February 2022. De Allergrootste Slijmfilm is the third film in the Slijmfilm film series. In July 2023, the sequel De Oneindige Slijmfilm was released.
