= Life as It Should Be =

2020 Dutch film directed by Ruud Schuurman

- Theatrical release poster
- Directed by: Ruud Schuurman
- Written by: Anna Pauwels
- Based on: Alles is zoals het zou moeten zijn by Daphne Deckers
- Produced by: Tom de Mol; Marcel de Block
- Cinematography: Han Wennink
- Edited by: Joost van de Wetering
- Music by: Johan Hoogewijs
- Production companies: Interstallar Pictures; A Private View; Tom de Mol Productions
- Distributed by: Dutch FilmWorks
- Release date: 29 July 2020 (Netherlands)
- Running time: 108 minutes
- Country: Netherlands
- Language: Dutch

Life as It Should Be (Dutch: Alles is zoals het zou moeten zijn) is a 2020 Dutch film directed by Ruud Schuurman. The film is based on the book of the same name by Dutch model, writer and host Daphne Deckers.

The film won the Golden Film award after having sold 100,000 tickets. It was the third highest-grossing Dutch film of 2020. It was also the fourth best visited Dutch film of 2020.

In March 2022, the sequel Alles is nog steeds zoals het zou moeten zijn was announced.
