= Just Say Yes (film) =

2021 Dutch film

- Official release poster
- Directed by: Appie Boudellah; Aram van de Rest
- Written by: Appie Boudellah; Mustapha Boudellah; Marie Kiebert; Maarten van den Broek
- Starring: Yolanthe Cabau; Huub Smit; Jim Bakkum
- Cinematography: Max Maloney
- Edited by: Manuel Rombley
- Production company: AM Pictures
- Distributed by: Netflix
- Release date: 2 April 2021 (Netherlands)
- Running time: 97 minutes
- Country: Netherlands
- Language: Dutch

Just Say Yes is a 2021 Dutch romantic comedy film directed by Appie Boudellah and Aram van de Rest, written by Appie Boudellah, Mustapha Boudellah, Marie Kiebert, and Maarten van den Broek and starring Yolanthe Cabau, Huub Smit, and Jim Bakkum.

The film was released on 2 April 2021 by Netflix.

== Plot ==
33-year-old Lotte works as a producer for the TV channel Regio Fun in the A'DAM Toren, where her boyfriend Alex has his own talk show. Lotte has been in a relationship with him for five years and, being the romantic she is, has long been hoping in vain for a marriage proposal. The TV studio has been struggling with poor ratings for some time and Lotte is working hard on a pitch for a new program that should become a ratings cannon. The editor-in-chief Fritz has hired Chris as a creative, and above all commercial, brain to save the channel.

Lotte is far from enthusiastic about Chris's many commercial ideas. Meanwhile, Alex takes credit for Lotte's pitch and the relationship with her ends shortly afterwards on live television. As she lived with him, she is forced to look for a new home. She moves in with her sister Estelle; She was once Lotte's rock, but Lotte has not been able to count on her for years.

Estelle is a successful, superficial and narcissistic influencer. She becomes engaged to Lotte's boss John and asks Lotte and friend Kim to take care of the organization of the wedding. Although Lotte is not happy that Estelle has run off with her boss and is also preparing the wedding Lotte has longed for years, she accepts.

During the recording of a TV program that Lotte produces, the presenter Beau is nowhere to be seen last minute and Lotte steps in as presenter at Chris's insistence. She turns out to be a natural and the ratings skyrocket. Lotte has little interest in a career as a presenter, but Chris sees a possible ratings gun in Lotte and makes a deal with her: he will help her win Alex back, provided she continues to present programs for him. Part of this is a makeover, after which Lotte suddenly gets a lot of attention.

Gradually Lotte and Chris grow closer. Meanwhile, Alex's career is getting worse; his TV show is even cancelled. Desperate, he asks Lotte to marry him. She is caught off guard and disapproves of him, but gives the relationship a second chance. On the night before Estelle's wedding, Lotte discovers that Alex is having an affair with Kim and that Estelle knows about it. Lotte confronts her sister at the wedding; this leads to the wedding being cancelled. Eventually Lotte and Estelle bury the hatchet and Estelle still marries John. Chris makes a guest appearance at the wedding and finally kisses Lotte.

== Cast ==
- Yolanthe Cabau as Lotte
- Huub Smit as Fritz
- Jim Bakkum as Chris
- Noortje Herlaar as Estelle
- Nick Golterman as Trainer
- Edwin Jonker as John
- Pip Pellens as Kim
- Juvat Westendorp as Alex
- Nienke Plas as Pam
- Josylvio as Bilal
- Kim-Lian van der Meij as Guusje
- Nina Warink as Mandy
- Lisa Michels as Robin
- Winston Post as Beau
- Patricia Paay as Didi
