= De Oneindige Slijmfilm =

2023 Dutch film directed by Martijn Smits

- Theatrical release poster
- Directed by: Martijn Smits
- Starring: Bibi; Denise Aznam; Aaron Bezemer
- Distributed by: Splendid Film
- Release date: 5 July 2023
- Running time: 76 minutes
- Country: Netherlands
- Language: Dutch

De Oneindige Slijmfilm (lit. 'The Infinite Slime Film') is a 2023 Dutch adventure film directed by Martijn Smits. The film won the Golden Film award after having sold 100,000 tickets. The film is the sequel to the 2022 film De Allergrootste Slijmfilm, which is also directed by Martijn Smits.

De Oneindige Slijmfilm is the fourth film in the Slijmfilm film series. The film finished in 9th place in the list of best visited Dutch films of 2023 with just over 155,000 visitors.
