= Dochters =

2025 Dutch film directed by Johan Nijenhuis

- Theatrical release poster
- Directed by: Johan Nijenhuis
- Written by: Edward Stelder; Anna Pauwels
- Based on: Women on the Run
- Produced by: Johan Nijenhuis; Ingmar Menning
- Starring: Sanne Vogel; Barbara Sloesen; Abbey Hoes
- Production companies: Johan Nijenhuis & Co.; Dingie
- Distributed by: Dutch FilmWorks
- Release date: 8 May 2025
- Country: Netherlands
- Language: Dutch

Dochters (Dutch for: Daughters) is a 2025 Dutch comedy film directed by Johan Nijenhuis. The film is a remake of the 2019 Czech film Women on the Run.

Sanne Vogel, Barbara Sloesen and Abbey Hoes play roles in the film. Anne-Mieke Ruyten and Jan Kooijman also play roles in the film.

Principal photography began in October 2024. The film finished in 14th place in the list of best visited Dutch films of 2025. In total, just over 98,000 tickets were sold.
