= De Bellinga's: Vakantie op stelten =

2023 Dutch film directed by Armando de Boer

- Theatrical release poster
- Directed by: Armando de Boer
- Starring: De Bellinga's
- Distributed by: Dutch FilmWorks
- Release date: 12 July 2023
- Country: Netherlands
- Language: Dutch

De Bellinga's: Vakantie op stelten is a 2023 Dutch children's film directed by Armando de Boer. The film features the Dutch vlogging family De Bellinga's. The film won the Golden Film award after having sold 100,000 tickets. It is their second Golden Film award as their 2022 film De Bellinga's: Huis op stelten also won the Golden Film award.

Principal photography began in April 2023. Hetty Heyting and Johnny Kraaijkamp also play roles in the film. The film became the fourth best visited Dutch film of 2023.
