= De Nog Grotere Slijmfilm =

2021 Dutch film directed by Martijn Smits

- Theatrical release poster
- Directed by: Martijn Smits
- Distributed by: Splendid Film
- Release date: 7 July 2021
- Running time: 81 minutes
- Country: Netherlands
- Language: Dutch
- Box office: $618,116

De Nog Grotere Slijmfilm: Het Geheim van Octoslijm (lit. 'The Even Greater Slime Film: The Secret of Octoslime') is a 2021 Dutch adventure film directed by Martijn Smits. The film is the sequel to the 2020 film De Grote Slijmfilm directed by Hans Somers.

The film won the Golden Film award after having sold 100,000 tickets. The film finished in 14th place in the list of best visited films in the Netherlands in 2021 with just over 247,000 visitors.

De Nog Grotere Slijmfilm: Het Geheim van Octoslijm is the second film in the Slijmfilm film series. In February 2022, the sequel De Allergrootste Slijmfilm was announced.
