= De Grote Slijmfilm =

2020 Dutch film directed by Hans Somers

- Theatrical release poster
- Directed by: Hans Somers
- Distributed by: Splendid Film
- Release date: 5 February 2020
- Running time: 81 minutes
- Country: Netherlands
- Language: Dutch

De Grote Slijmfilm (lit. 'The Great Slime Film') is a 2020 Dutch adventure film directed by Hans Somers. The film won the Golden Film award after having sold 100,000 tickets. It was both the best visited Dutch children's film and the fourth highest-grossing Dutch film of 2020. It was also the fifth best visited Dutch film of 2020.

De Grote Slijmfilm is the first film in the Slijmfilm film series. In January 2021, the sequel De Nog Grotere Slijmfilm was announced.
