= Dutch FilmWorks =

Dutch film distributor

- Type: Subsidiary
- Industry: Film distribution and film production
- Founded: 1998; 28 years ago
- Headquarters: Burgemeester Verderlaan 15 3544 AD, Utrecht, Netherlands
- Area served: Benelux
- Products: Motion pictures
- Owner: StudioCanal (majority)
- Website: www.dfw.nl

Dutch FilmWorks B.V. is a Dutch film distributor founded in 1998, based in Utrecht, the Netherlands, focusing on Benelux rights mainly to release films theatrically, on DVD, Blu-ray and VOD. They are also a publisher and distributor of books and magazines.

They have recently released several TV series in the CBS library on DVD, under license from CBS Home Entertainment and Paramount Pictures.

In 2022, StudioCanal acquired a majority stake in Dutch FilmWorks.

== Background ==
Originally a home media distributor, Dutch Filmworks purchases film licenses and releases these in the Benelux, and has a distribution library of over 2,500 titles. Large titles distributed by Dutch FilmWorks include Exorcist: The Prequel, The Grudge, The Aviator, Unleashed, Mr. Magorium's Wonder Emporium, The Final Cut and Saw, as well as Dutch products such as the television series Westenwind and the film 06/05.

'The House of Knowledge' is a separate branch of the business that distributes documentaries, including those from Discovery Channel.

'Moefieklub' was a separate branch of the business that distributes Children's movies/TV shows, including those from Junior. The company was founded in late 2005 and the company became defunct in early 2010s. The company sold its NTR sales to JustBridge in late 2011.

In 2005, Dutch FilmWorks, along with Inspire Pictures and Lumière founded Benelux Film Distributors to distribute films theatrically. In June 2011, Dutch FilmWorks left BFD to start its own theatrical unit.

In June 2022, French company StudioCanal acquired a majority stake in Dutch FilmWorks, adding the company to StudioCanal's vast belt of successful television and film companies in Europe. DFW will focus on both movies and television, with its management and operations unchanged. StudioCanal's first collaboration with Dutch FilmWorks is an adaptation of the Magical Pharmacy book series, co-produced by DFW and StudioCanal's German arm.

== Legal issues ==
Dutch FilmWorks submitted plans, on 17 March 2017, to the Dutch Data Protection Authority (Autoriteit Persoonsgegevens) to work with ISP's to combat “the unlawful dissemination of copyright protected works”. This involved connecting the names and addresses of known IP addresses involved in disseminating copyrighted material. The Dutch Data Protection Authority published their draft judgement, which would grant permission to Dutch FilmWorks, after a period for public comment which lasted until 25 August 2017.

Legal enforcement has been challenging, with some ISPs refusing to provide the names and addresses of customers. A lawsuit brought against Ziggo in 2019, by Dutch FilmWorks, was found to be without basis by the Central Netherlands Court. The ruling found that Ziggo did not need to provide names and addresses of customers to Dutch FilmWorks based on privacy concerns.

== Filmography ==
=== Dutch films ===
Release date	Title	Notes
2010s
15 February 2012	Achtste Groepers Huilen Niet	Produced by Bijker Film & TV, Rinkel Film and Evangelische Omroep
19 December 2012	Het Bombardement	Produced by Fu Works
20 June 2013	Regret!	Produced by Shooting Star Filmcompany and Katholieke Radio Omroep
26 September 2013	De Nieuwe Wildernis	Produced by EMS FILMS
3 July 2014	Secrets of War	
29 April 2015	The Little Gangster	
18 June 2015	SpangaS in Actie	
16 July 2016	Meester Kikker	
8 September 2016	Adios Amigos	
29 September 2016	De Held	
13 October 2016	Prey	
8 March 2018	The Resistance Banker	
9 May 2019	Singel 39	
2020s
30 January 2020	Men at Work: Miami	
1 July 2020	Pirates Down the Street	
29 July 2020	Life as It Should Be	
9 September 2021	My Best Friend Anne Frank	
14 October 2021	Anne+	
28 April 2022	Costa!!	
25 June 2022	Zwanger & Co	
13 July 2022	Silverstar	
15 September 2022	Soof 3	
12 October 2022	De Club van Sinterklaas en de Race Tegen de Klok	
14 December 2022	Hotel Sinestra	
2 March 2023	Broken	
12 July 2023	De Bellinga's: Vakantie op stelten	
11 December 2023	Neem me mee	
21 March 2024	Memory Lane	
8 May 2025	Dochters	
6 October 2025	Onze Jongens 3	

=== Non-Dutch films ===
==== 2011 ====
- 50/50 (01/12/11)
- Don't Be Afraid of the Dark (24/11/11)
- Come as You Are (24/11/11)
- The Three Musketeers (13/10/11)

==== 2012 ====
- Alex Cross (06/12/12)
- ATM (20/09/12)
- Bait 3D (19/04/12)
- The Bay (22/11/12)
- The Cabin in the Woods (19/04/12)
- The Company Men (12/04/12)
- The Divide (17/05/12)
- The Double (05/07/12)
- The Expendables 2 (16/08/12)
- A Few Best Men (11/10/12)
- God Bless America (30/08/12)
- A Good Old Fashioned Orgy (26/01/12)
- The Grey (08/03/12)
- Hesher (23/02/12)
- Killing Them Softly (18/10/12)
- LOL (05/07/12)
- Playing for Keeps (20/12/12)
- Now Is Good (04/10/12)
- Red Lights (30/08/12)
- What to Expect When You're Expecting (24/05/12)
- The Woman in Black (23/02/12)
- The Words (13/12/12)

==== 2013 ====
- Arbitrage (21/02/13)
- Behind the Candelabra (08/08/13)
- Broken City (14/03/13)
- Catch 44 (27/06/13)
- Escape Plan (17/10/13)
- The Haunting in Georgia (23/05/13)
- Homefront (28/11/13)
- Hummingbird (11/07/13)
- The Iceman (06/06/13)
- Love and Honor (04/07/13)
- Make Your Move (25/07/13)
- Movie 43 (21/02/13)
- Olympus Has Fallen (09/05/13)
- Riddick (05/09/13)
- Thérèse Desqueyroux (21/03/13)
- Walking with Dinosaurs (21/03/13)
- You're Next (22/08/13)

==== 2014 ====
- Brick Mansions (08/05/14)
- Cuban Fury (21/08/14)
- Dumb and Dumber To (13/11/14)
- Horns (13/11/14)
- Jessabelle (27/11/14)
- Out of the Furnace (30/01/14)
- Reasonable Doubt (01/05/14)
- Revenge of the Green Dragons (06/11/14)
- Two Night Stand (11/12/14)
- Vampire Academy (20/02/14)
- Walk of Shame (22/05/14)
- The Wolf of Wall Street (09/01/14)
- You're Not You (18/12/14)

==== 2015 ====
- 5 Flights Up (02/07/15)
- The Age of Adaline (18/06/15)
- Big Game (07/05/15)
- Dying of the Light (19/03/15)
- Good People (26/02/15)
- Knock Knock (03/09/15)
- Look Who's Back (26/11/15)
- The Program (19/11/15)
- She's Funny That Way (23/07/15)
- Sleeping with Other People (05/11/15)
- Son of a Gun (09/04/15)
- Survivor (02/07/15)
- The Taking of Deborah Logan (29/01/15)
- A Walk in the Woods (17/12/15)
- We Are Your Friends (27/08/15)
- Wild Card (05/02/15)

==== 2016 ====
- 99 Homes (04/02/16)
- Bad Moms (011/08/16)
- Dirty Grandpa (18/02/16)
- The Family Fang (21/07/16)
- I Am Wrath (14/04/16)
- Incarnate (08/12/16)
- The Infiltrator (15/09/16)
- Marauders (14/07/16)
- Mechanic: Resurrection (01/09/16)
- Miss You Already (07/04/16)
- Mother's Day (28/04/16)
- Point Break (07/01/16)
- Skiptrace (11/08/16)
- Term Life (30/06/16)

==== 2017 ====
- 47 Meters Down (22/06/17)
- All Eyez on Me (15/06/17)
- Chuck (08/06/17)
- The Hitman's Bodyguard (17/08/17)
- Kidnap (31/08/17)
- Leatherface (02/11/17)
- Logan Lucky (24/08/17)
- Unlocked (04/05/17)

==== 2018 ====
- Death Wish (08/03/18)
- Destination Wedding (15/11/18)
- Every Day (22/02/18)
- Hotel Artemis (28/06/18)
- Hunter Killer (25/10/18)
- I Still See You (29/11/18)
- LBJ (15/03/18)
- Loving Pablo (31/05/18)
- Overboard (24/05/18)
- Papillon (13/09/18)

==== 2019 ====
- Angel Has Fallen (22/08/19)
- Arctic (14/03/19)
- Child's Play (20/09/19)
- Dragged Across Concrete (02/05/19)
- Hellboy (11/04/19)
- Midsommar (25/07/19)
- Midway (07/11/19)
- The Professor (01/08/19)
- Rambo: Last Blood (19/09/19)
- Replicas (03/01/19)

==== 2020 ====
- Come Away (10/12/20)
- The Comeback Trail (03/12/20)
- Gretel & Hansel (30/01/20)
- The Marksman (08/10/20)
- Hope Gap (13/08/20)
- I Still Believe (25/06/20)
- The Outpost (02/07/20)
- Relic (20/08/20)
- The Secret: Dare to Dream (17/09/20)
- The Secrets We Keep (19/11/20)

==== 2021 ====
- Blackbird (10/06/21)
- Herself (25/11/21)
- Hitman's Wife's Bodyguard (22/07/21)
- The Ice Road (19/08/21)
- The Mauritanian (01/07/21)
- Till Death (23/09/21)
- Wrong Turn (15/07/21)

==== 2022 ====
- Blacklight (24/02/22)
- The Estate (24/11/22)
- Fall (01/09/22)
- Moonfall (24/03/22)
- The Offering (08/12/22)
- Prey for the Devil (17/11/22)
- Rogue Agent (25/08/22)

==== 2023 ====
- Expend4bles (05/10/23)
- In the Land of Saints and Sinners (28/12/23)
- Kandahar (08/06/23)
- Maggie Moore(s) (29/06/23)
- Prisoner's Daughter (27/07/23)
- Silent Night (07/12/23)
- Sound of Freedom (26/10/23)
- Sympathy for the Devil (24/08/23)

==== 2024 ====
- Back to Black (18/04/24)
- Boy Kills World (20/06/24)
- The Great Escaper (15/02/24)
- Land of Bad (22/02/24)
- Longing (10/10/24)
- Something in the Water (18/07/24)
- Sting (25/04/24)
- Strange Darling (26/09/24)
- Wicked Little Letters (07/03/24)

==== 2025 ====
- Afterburn (21/08/25)
- Inheritance (30/01/25)
- Locked (01/05/25)
- Paddington in Peru (23/01/25)
- The Running Man (13/11/25)
- Silent Night, Deadly Night (11/12/25)
- William Tell (20/02/25)

==== 2026 ====
- Backrooms (29/05/26)
- Cold Storage (05/02/26)
- Deep Water (TBA)
- Dust Bunny (29/01/26)
- Extrawurst (07/05/26)
- Fall 2: Deadpoint (17/09/26)
- The Furious (09/07/26)
- The Further Mis-Adventures of Cliff Booth (25/11/26)
- How to Make a Killing (05/03/26)
- The Hunger Games: Sunrise on the Reaping (19/11/26)
- Ice Cream Man (06/08/26)
- LifeHack (11/06/26)
- Kangaroo (23/07/26)
- Motor City (30/07/26)
- Pressure (10/09/26)
- Shaun the Sheep: The Beast of Mossy Bottom (07/10/26)
- The Strangers – Chapter 3 (30/04/26)
- Violette (10/12/26)

==== 2027 ====
- Elsinore (04/02/27)
- Ink (07/01/27)
- Karoshi (11/02/27)
