= Pirates Down the Street =

2020 Dutch film directed by Pim van Hoeve

- Theatrical release poster
- Directed by: Pim van Hoeve
- Screenplay by: Sander de Regt
- Based on: De piraten van hiernaast by Reggie Naus
- Produced by: Johan Nijenhuis; Ingmar Menning
- Starring: Matti Stooker; Egbert Jan Weeber; Samuel Beau Reurekas
- Cinematography: Guido van Gennep
- Edited by: Jurriaan van Nimwegen
- Music by: Matthijs Kieboom
- Production companies: Johan Nijenhuis & Co; Evangelische Omroep
- Distributed by: Dutch FilmWorks
- Release date: 1 July 2020
- Running time: 94 minutes
- Country: Netherlands
- Language: Dutch
- Box office: $1,900,298

Pirates Down the Street (Dutch: De Piraten van Hiernaast) is a 2020 Dutch film directed by Pim van Hoeve. The film is based on the 2011 children's book of the same name written by Reggie Naus. The film won the Golden Film award after having sold 100,000 tickets. It was the fifth highest-grossing Dutch film of 2020. It was also the sixth best visited Dutch film of 2020.

Filming began in July 2019.

In July 2021, a sequel was announced.
