= Abbey Hoes =

Dutch actress (born 1994)

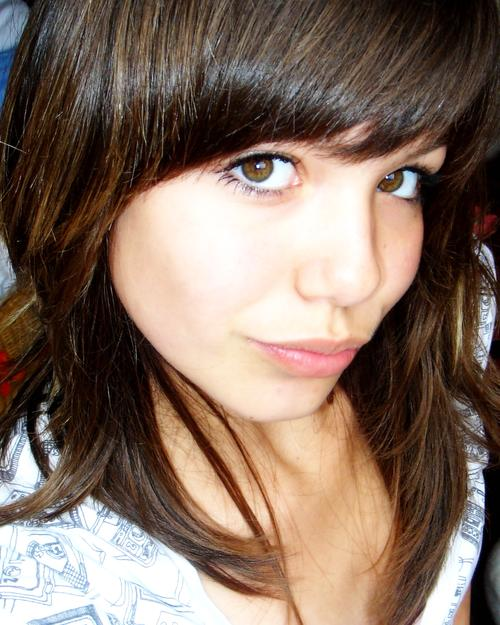
- Abbey Hoes in 2008
- Born: Emily Abigail Ashley Hoes; 20 May 1994 (age 32); Rotterdam, Netherlands
- Occupation: Actress
- Years active: 2008–present

Emily Abigail Ashley Hoes (born 20 May 1994) is a Dutch film and television actress. She won a Golden Calf for Best Actress at the Netherlands Film Festival and a Shooting Stars Award at the Berlin International Film Festival for her role in Nena (2014).

== Filmography ==
=== Film ===
- Maite was here (2009) – role: Maite
- Tirza (2010) – role: Ibi
- Finnemans (2010) –role: Lizzie
- Nina Satana 2011) – role: Nina
- Furious (film) (2011) – role: Roosmarijn
- To Be King (2012) – role: Kim
- Nena (2014) – role: Nena
- Escape (2015) – role: young Julia
- Ventoux (2015) – role: young Laura
- ‘’Hotel de Grote L’’ (2017) - role: Libbie
- Zwaar verliefd! (2018) - role: Tamara
- Cuban Love (2019) – role: Maartje
- Costa!! (2022)
- Rokjesnacht (2024)
- Dochters (2025)
- Nomad (TBA)

=== Television ===
- SpangaS (2008) – role: Brechtje
- The Year Zero (2009–2012) – role: Felix
- VRijland (2010–2012) – role: Daantje Kruithof
- Feuten (2012) – role: Charlie Zekveld
- Violetta (2013) – voice: Violetta
- Snow White (2014) – role: Blanche (Snow White)
- Zwarte tulp (2015-2016) – role: Lynn Kester

=== As contestant ===
- De Verraders (2021)
- Het Perfecte Plaatje (2021)

== Awards ==
- Golden Calf for Best Actress (2014) for her role Nena in Nena
- Shooting Stars Award (2015) for her role Nena in Nena
