= List of Dutch films of the 2010s =

This is a list of films produced in the Netherlands during the 2010s.

== 2010 ==
Title	Director	Cast	Genre	Notes
Iep!	Ineke Houtman	Huub Stapel; Joke Tjalsma; Kenadie Jourdin-Bromley	Family film	17 February 2010; Director withdrew her name after an argument with the producers.
Gangsterboys	Paul Ruven	Georgina Verbaan; Yes-r	Comedy	18 February 2010
Zwart Water	Elbert van Strien	Hadewych Minis; Barry Atsma	Horror	11 March 2010
First Mission	Boris Pavel Conen	Anniek Pheifer; Tygo Gernandt	Drama	25 March 2010
Kom niet aan mijn kinderen	Ron Termaat	Karina Smulders; Thom Hoffman	Drama	6 May 2010
Life is an Art	Jayant R. Harnam	Martin Swabey; Alison Carroll	Thriller	18 May 2010; English-language
De Vliegenierster van Kazbek	Ineke Smits	Sallie Harmsen; Jack Wouterse	Drama	8 April 2010
Verloren Jaren	Bas Labruyère	Wouter de Jong; Frederik de Groot	Drama	13 April 2010
The Happy Housewife	Antoinette Beumer	Carice van Houten; Jaap Spijkers	Drama	15 April 2010
Shocking Blue	Mark de Cloe	Lisa Smit; Dragan Bakema	Drama	12 August 2010
Sterke Verhalen	Kees van Nieuwkerk and Teddy Cherim	Achmed Achkabi	Comedy	19 August 2010
Vreemdbloed	Johan Timmers	Wim Opbrouck; Viviane De Muynck; Jelle de Jong	Drama	2 September 2010
Tirza	Rudolf van den Berg	Gijs Scholten van Aschat	Drama	30 September 2010
Foeksia De Miniheks	Johan Nijenhuis	Rachelle Verdel; Porgy Franssen	Fantasy	6 October 2010
Sinterklaas en het Pakjes Mysterie	Martijn van Nellestijn	Pamela Teves; Inge Ipenburg	Family film	13 October 2010
Briefgeheim	Simone van Dusseldorp	Daan Schuurmans; Lies Visschedijk; Hanna Obbeek	Family film	14 October 2010
Schemer	Hanro Smitsman	Melody Klaver; Gaite Jansen	Drama	14 October 2010
Lang & Gelukkig	Pieter Kramer	Arjan Ederveen; Gijs Naber; Jack Wouters	Drama	14 October 2010
I'm Never Afraid!	Willem Baptist	Mack Bouwense	Documentary short film (25 min.)	23 October 2010
Majesteit	Peter de Baan	Carine Crutzen; Gijs Naber; Hadewych Minis	Drama	28 October 2010
Sint	Dick Maas	Bert Luppes; Huub Stapel; Egbert Jan Weeber	Horror	11 November 2010
Position Among the Stars	Leonard Retel Helmrich	Three generations of Sjamsuddin family living in Jakarta	Documentary	17 November 2010
Richting West	Nicole van Kilsdonk	Stefan Rokebrand; Susan Visser; Viggo Waas	Drama	18 November 2010
Dik Trom	Arne Toonen	Michael Nierse; Fiona Livingston; Eva Van Der Gucht	Comedy; Youth	24 November 2010
De Eetclub	Robert Jan Westdijk	Bracha van Doesburgh; Mark van Eeuwen	Drama	25 November 2010
Het Geheim	Joram Lürsen	Theo Maassen; Chantal Janzen; Daan Schuurmans	Family film	1 December 2010
New Kids Turbo	Steffen Haars; Flip van der Kuil	Huub Smit; Tim Haars; Wesley van Gaalen; Steffen Haars; Flip van der Kuil	Comedy	9 December 2010
Loft	Antoinette Beumer	Jeroen van Koningsbrugge	Drama; Thriller	16 December 2010

== 2011 ==
Title	Director	Cast	Genre	Notes
The Silent Historian	Simonka de Jong	Members of de Jong family archive footage of Loe de Jong, Ischa Meijer and Ivo Niehe	Documentary	1 January 2011
Sonny Boy	Maria Peters	Ricky Koole; Sergio Hasselbaink	Drama	27 January 2011
Mijn opa de bankrover	Ineke Houtman	Michiel Romeyn	Comedy	9 February 2011
Pizza Maffia	Tim Oliehoek	Lijas Ojja	Comedy	15 February 2011
Gooische Vrouwen	Will Koopman	Linda de Mol; Susan Visser	Comedy	10 March 2011
Black Butterflies	Paula van der Oest	Rutger Hauer; Carice van Houten	Drama	31 March 2011
Alle Tijd	Job Gosschalk	Paul de Leeuw; Karina Smulders	Drama	14 April 2011
0 - 100 years	Jeroen Wolf	101 citizens	Documentary short film	3 June 2011
Caged	Stephan Brenninkmeijer	Chantal Demming; Babette Holtmann; Joep Sertons; Victor Reinier	Psychological thriller Neo noir First Dutch video on demand film	1 September 2011
Amsterdam Heavy	Michael Wright	Fajah Lourens; Alison Carroll; Semmy Schilt; Michael Madsen	Actie	12 September 2011; English-language
Nova Zembla	Reinout Oerlemans	Robert de Hoog; Derek de Lint; Victor Reinier; Jan Decleir	Drama; Historical film First feature length Dutch 3D film	24 November 2011

== 2012 ==
Title	Director	Cast	Genre	Notes
Are All Men Pedophiles?	Jan-Willem Breure	Savannah van Zweeden	Documentary	2 March 2012
Nema Aviona za Zagreb	Louis van Gasteren	Meher Baba; Timothy Leary	Drama; Documentary	20 November 2012
The Price of Heaven	Jack Janssen	Pablo Rosario	Documentary	14 May 2012
Suskind	Rudolf van den Berg	Jeroen Spitzenberger	War drama	19 January 2012

== 2013 ==
Title	Director	Cast	Genre	Notes
Borgman	Alex van Warmerdam		Thriller	
Hemel op Aarde	Pieter Kuijpers		Drama	Set in 1978
Matterhorn	Diederik Ebbinge	René van 't Hof	Comedy	
Reporter				
De Nieuwe Wildernis	Ruben Smit; Mark Verkerk		Documentary	26 September 2013
Wild Boar	Willem Baptist		Documentary short film (25 min.)	18 October 2013
Superjews	Nirit Peled		Documentary	24 November 2013

== 2014 ==
Title	Director	Cast	Genre	Notes
Accused	Paula van der Oest	Ariane Schluter	Drama	
Amsterdam Express	Fatmir Koçi	Blerim Destani, James Biberi, Natasha Goulden	Drama	
Frailer	Mijke de Jong	Marnie Blok	Drama	
Nena	Saskia Diesing	Abbey Hoes, Uwe Ochsenknecht, Gijs Blom	Romance, Drama	
Sluizer Speaks	Dennis Alink	George Sluizer, Anne Lordon, Gene Bervoets, Johanna ter Steege, Jonathan Pryce	Documentary	

== 2015 ==
Title	Director	Cast	Genre	Notes
Michiel de Ruyter	Roel Reiné	Frank Lammers Barry Atsma; Egbert-Jan Weber; Gene Bervoets; Daniel Brocklebank	Historical drama	26 January 2015
The Little Gangster	Arne Toonen	Thor Braun; Henry van Loon; Meral Polat; Loes Haverkort	Comedy; Crime; Family	29 April 2015

== 2016 ==
Title	Director	Cast	Genre	Notes
The Day My Father Became a Bush	Nicole van Kilsdonk	Celeste Holsheimer Teun Kuilboer	Drama	10 September 2016
Layla M.	Mijke de Jong	Nora El Koussour	Drama	17 November 2016

== 2018 ==
Title	Director	Cast	Genre	Notes
Redbad	Roel Reiné	Gijs Naber	Historical drama	23 juni 2018

== 2019 ==
Title	Director	Cast	Genre	Notes
Brugklas: De tijd van m'n leven	Raymond Grimbergen	Sterre van Woudenberg; Julian Moon Snijder; Natasja Froger	Family film	7 February 2019
Cuban Love	Johan Nijenhuis	Susan Visser; Abbey Hoes	Romantic comedy	14 February 2019
Bloody Marie	Guido van Driel; Lennert Hillege	Susanne Wolff; Dragos Bucur; Teun Luijkx; Mark Rietman; Aart Staartjes	Drama	28 February 2019
Amsterdam Vice	Arne Toonen	Waldemar Torenstra; Fedja van Huêt; Tygo Gernandt	Crime	18 April 2019
Nocturne	Viktor van der Valk	Vincent van der Valk; Reinout Scholten van Aschat; Simone van Bennekom; Tom Dewispelaere; Bien de Moor	Drama	9 May 2019
Singel 39	Frank Krom	Lies Visschedijk; Waldemar Torenstra	Romantic comedy	9 May 2019
Take Me Somewhere Nice	Ena Sendijarevic	Lazar Dragojevic; Ernad Prnjavorac; Sara Luna Zoric	Drama	23 May 2019
About That Life	Shady El-Hamus	Bilal Wahib; Daniel Kolf; Oussama Ahammoud; Vera Bulder	Drama	13 June 2019
My Extraordinary Summer with Tess	Steven Wouterlood	Sonny Coops Van Utteren; Josephine Arendsen; Tjebbo Gerritsma; Jennifer Hoffman	Drama	3 July 2019
F*ck Love	Appie Boudellah; Lodewijk van Lelyveld	Bo Maerten; Thijs Römer; Yolanthe Cabau	Comedy, romance	26 September 2019
De Brief voor Sinterklaas	Lucio Messercola	Bram van der Vlugt; Edo Brunner; Lieke van Lexmond; Aad van Toor	Family	9 October 2019
The Promise of Pisa	Norbert ter Hall	Yorick van Wageningen; Monic Hendrickx; Nora El Koussour	Drama	10 October 2019
Mi Vida	Norbert ter Hall	Loes Luca; Elvira Mínguez	Comedy, drama	21 November 2019
