= Golden Calf for Best Supporting Role =

Dutch film award

The Golden Calf for Best Supporting Actor is a category of the Golden Calf award, presented at the Netherlands Film Festival since 2005. From 2021 onwards the award became a gender-neutral award.

== Best Supporting Actor (2005-2020) ==
Year	Actor(s)	Role	Film
2005	Yahya Gaier, Tygo Gernandt, Micha Hulshof, Gürkan Küçüksentürk and Mimoun Oaïssa	Mo, Goran, Sander, Ali and Amimoen	Het Schnitzelparadijs
2006	Fedja van Huêt	Marco van der Horst	Nachtrit
2007	Jan Decleir	Ernst	Wolfsbergen
2008	Ton Kas	Nico	Vox populi
2009	Raymond Thiry	Johan van Beusekom	Winter in Wartime
2010	Jeroen Willems	Prince Claus	Majesteit
2011	Peter Paul Muller	Martin Morero	Gooische Vrouwen
2012	René van 't Hof	Gerrit - Plan C	
2013	Jacob Derwig	Dick Tasman	Family Way
2014	Ton Kas	Theo	Jongens
2015	Raymond Thiry	Joop Hazes	Bloed, zweet & tranen
2016	Marcel Hensema	Jozef Mieras	In My Father's Garden
2017	Mohammed Azaay	father	Layla M.
2018	Wim Opbrouck	Wickmayer	Cobain
2019	Thomas Höppener	DJ Dex	About That Life
2020	Bilal Wahib	Youssef	Paradise Drifters

== Best Supporting Actress (2005-2020) ==
Year	Actor(s)	Role	Film
2005	Sophie van Winden	Isabelle	Leef!
2006	Catherine ten Bruggencate	Lotti	Ik omhels je met 1000 armen
2007	Sylvia Hoeks	The Girl	Duska
2008	Olga Louzgina	Mother	Het zusje van Katja
2009	Pleuni Touw	Ada	Bride Flight
2010	Coosje Smid	Denise	Joy
2011	Beppie Melissen	Cor Hogenbrink	Gooische Vrouwen
2012	Olga Zuiderhoek	Henriëtte Pimentel	Süskind
2013	Georgina Verbaan	Anita	De Marathon
2014	Lies Visschedijk	Gertie Geraedts	Hemel op aarde
2015	Hadewych Minis	Rachel Hazes	Bloed, zweet & tranen
2016	Anneke Blok	Grandmother	The Fury
2017	Marie-Louise Stheins	Ben's mother	Waldstille
2018	Fockeline Ouwerkerk	Tilly van Hall	The Resistance Banker
2019	Julia Akkermans	Elisabeth de Vries	Open Seas
2020	Noortje Herlaar	Margot	Romy's Salon

== Best Supporting Role ==
- 2021 Yorick van Wageningen as Michaël de Jong in The Judgement
- 2022 Tobias Kersloot as Thomas in Do Not Hesitate
- 2023 Florian Myjer as Cornelis in Sweet Dreams
- 2024 Laura Bakker in Dit is geen kerstfilm
- 2025 Neidi dos Santos Livramento as Nadia in Three Days of Fish
- 2026 Thor Braun as Bas in Downtown
