= Love in Paradise =

2026 Dutch film directed by Johan Nijenhuis

- Dutch: Verliefd op Curaçao
- Directed by: Johan Nijenhuis
- Written by: Annelouise van Naerssen
- Produced by: Johan Nijenhuis; Ingmar Menning
- Cinematography: Hidde Boorsma
- Edited by: Elsbeth Kasteel
- Music by: Clifford Goilo
- Production companies: Johan Nijenhuis & Co.
- Distributed by: Independent Films
- Release date: 26 January 2026
- Country: Netherlands
- Languages: Dutch; Papiamento

Love in Paradise (Dutch: Verliefd op Curaçao, also known as Love in Curaçao) is a 2026 Dutch romantic comedy film directed by Johan Nijenhuis. The film won the Golden Film award after having sold 100,000 tickets. It is the first Golden Film award of 2026.

Isa Hoes, Fedja Louman and Joy Delima play roles in the film. Jasmine Sendar, Kasper van Kooten and Tarikh Janssen also play roles in the film. The film is the sequel to the films Verliefd op Ibiza (2013), Cuban Love (2019) en Loving Bali (2024).
