= Love Revisited =

2017 Dutch drama film

- Theatrical release poster
- Directed by: Nicole van Kilsdonk
- Written by: Peer Wittenbols
- Produced by: Ineke Kanters; Jan van der Zanden
- Starring: Beppie Melissen; Gene Bervoets; Halina Reijn; Eva Van der Gucht; Hadewych Minis
- Cinematography: Richard van Oosterhout
- Edited by: Wouter Jansen
- Music by: Joris Oonk
- Production companies: The Film Kitchen; A Private View; Omroep MAX
- Distributed by: September Film Distribution
- Release date: 2 November 2017 (Netherlands)
- Running time: 99 minutes
- Country: Netherlands
- Language: Dutch
- Box office: $65,270

Love Revisited (Dutch: Oude Liefde) is a 2017 Dutch romantic drama directed by Nicole van Kilsdonk and written by Peer Wittenbols and it stars Beppie Melissen, Gene Bervoets and Halina Reijn. The story revolves around a long separated divorced couple in their sixties are brought back together unexpectedly when their son passes away.

This was the second collaboration between director Nicole van Kilsdonk and screenwriter Peer Wittenbolt. Filming happened in the fall of 2016. The film was released in Dutch theaters on 2 November 2017, to a mixed-positive reception from critics. Aus Greidanus sr. was nominated for a Golden Calf for Best Supporting Actor.

== Cast ==
- Beppie Melissen as Fer
- Gene Bervoets as Fransje
- Halina Reijn as Tess
- Eva Van der Gucht as Hilde
- Hadewych Minis as Maria
- Claudia Kanne as Myrthe
- Carly Wijs as Nathalie
- Aus Greidanus sr. as Andries
- Wim Opbrouck as Ton van Karspel
- Leo Alkemade as Roland

== Production ==
Following 2014's Onder het hart, director Nicole van Kilsdonk and screenwriter Peer Wittenbolt reunited for Love Revisited. The lead characters were played Beppie Melissen and Gène Bervoets, the rest of the cast was filled by their current partners (Carly Wijs and Aus Greidanus), their children (Leo Alkemade, Eva van der Gucht and Halina Reijn) and daughter-in-law (Hadewych Minis). Filming started on October 10, 2017. Some of the filming took place in Ijmuiden. They also filmed in parts of Noord-Limburg. The movie alongside 22 other films received money from the Netherlands Film Production Incentive. Jett Rebel remade the song Send Me a Postcard as the title song for the film.

== Release ==
The film was released in Dutch theaters on 2 November 2017.

== Reception ==
Love Revisited received mostly mixed-to-positive reviews from critics.

Aus Greidanus sr. was nominated for a Golden Kalf for best supporting actor at the 2018's Netherlands Film Festival
