= &Me =

- Directed by: Norbert ter Hall
- Written by: Norbert ter Hall, Oscar van den Boogaard
- Based on: Fremdkörper by Oscar van den Boogaard
- Produced by: Petra Goedings
- Starring: Mark Waschke; Verónica Echegui; Teun Luijkx; Rossy de Palma
- Cinematography: Richard Oosterhout
- Edited by: Isabel Meier
- Music by: Jasper Boeke
- Distributed by: Cineart
- Release date: 10 March 2009
- Countries: Belgium; Germany; Spain; Netherlands; France
- Languages: English; French; German; Spanish; Dutch

&Me is a European romantic comedy film, written and directed by Norbert ter Hall based on a novel by Oscar van den Boogaard. It was produced by Phanta Vision Film International and released in 2009.

== Cast ==
- Mark Waschke as Eduard Schiller
- Verónica Echegui as Edurne Verona
- Teun Luijkx as Richard Merkelbach
- Rossy de Palma as Mama Verona
- Pamela Knaack as Getrud
- Howard Charles as Albert
- Rafael Cebrian as Julio

== Background ==
&Me was shot across four countries in eight weeks, is told in five languages and employed an international cast and crew, claiming eight different nationalities. It takes place in the setting of the European Parliament moving every month from Brussels to Strasbourg in a convoy of enormous trucks.

The screenplay is based on the novel Fremdkörper by author Oscar van den Boogaard. His books are sold and translated in The Netherlands, Belgium, France, Germany, the UK, the US and Canada.
