= Gooische Vrouwen =

Dutch drama television series

- Created by: Linda de Mol
- Written by: Niek Barendsen; Frank Houtappels; Joan Nederlof; Steven R. Thé; Anita Voorham; Jetske Vulsma; Lex Wertwijn; Simone Wiegel; Carolien Zilverberg; Linda de Mol; Bernard van Sterkenburg
- Directed by: Will Koopman
- Starring: Linda de Mol; Annet Malherbe; Tjitske Reidinga; Susan Visser; Peter Paul Muller; Leopold Witte; Daniël Boissevain; Derek de Lint; Lies Visschedijk
- Music by: Daan van Rijsbergen
- Country of origin: Netherlands
- No. of seasons: 5
- No. of episodes: 42

Production
- Cinematography: Joost van Herwijnen
- Running time: 78 minutes

Original release
- Network: Tien (2005-2006); RTL 4 (2007-2009)
- Release: 2005 – 2009

Gooische Vrouwen is a Dutch comedy-drama series, created by Linda de Mol for her brother John de Mol's TV network Tien in 2005, along the lines of Desperate Housewives or Sex and the City. After the show's second season, its original channel was acquired by RTL Nederland and Gooische Vrouwen was transferred to its flagship channel RTL 4, where it ran for three more seasons until its finale in 2009. After its 42-episode run the show was followed by a theatrically released feature film (also called Gooische Vrouwen) in 2011. The show chronicles the everyday lives of four female friends living in the Gooi.

Gooische Vrouwen has since been sold to India (for which version Linda de Mol dubbed her own voice), Belgium, France and Serbia.

== Plot overview ==
The show chronicles the everyday lives of four female friends living in the Gooi (the Dutch equivalent of Beverly Hills).

Cheryl and her husband, charm singer Martin Morero, move from Amsterdam to the Gooi after the huge success of his latest song "Echte Liefde" (true love). However, the working-class Moreros soon realize they do not fit in with the upper-class residents of the Gooi. Other problems in the Moreros' life include Martin's constant philandering and their continued yet unsuccessful attempts at having a baby.

Housewife Willemijn Lodewijkx is married to Evert, with whom she has three children - bored Roderick, difficult Louise and timid Annabel. But after more than twenty years of marriage, they seem to be stuck. While Willemijn tries to keep her spirits up, her marriage disintegrates. After the third season, Willemijn is replaced by Roelien Grootheeze.

Free-spirited artist Anouk Verschuur specializes in making highly erotic art. Anouk herself is also blessed with a very healthy libido which leads her into the arms of many a stranger, although she is still not completely over her pilot ex-husband Tom Blaauw, with whom she has a daughter, precocious Vlinder.

Ruthless divorce lawyer Claire van Kampen is struck by personal tragedy which pushes her estranged daughter Merel even further away, while plunging the two into financial difficulties. Claire must come up with ever more drastic schemes to keep their heads above water.

The four women confide in each other and in their enigmatic psychiatrist Dr. Ed Rossi. Meanwhile, mysterious Thai au pair Tippi Wan seems to have an agenda of her own, manipulating and scheming her way into the lives of the four women.

== Cast ==
Name	Role	Seasons					Episodes
Name	Role	1	2	3	4	5	Episodes
Linda de Mol	Cheryl Morero-van Veen	Main					42
Tjitske Reidinga	Claire van Kampen	Main					42
Susan Visser	Anouk Verschuur	Main					42
Peter Paul Muller	Martin Morero	Main					42
Leopold Witte	Evert Lodewijkx	Main					42
Daniël Boissevain	Tom Blaauw	Main					42
Derek de Lint	Dr. Ed Rossi	Main					42
Annet Malherbe	Willemijn Lodewijkx-Verbrugge	Main					25
Lies Visschedijk	Roelien Grootheeze				9	Main	17
Cystine Carreon	Tippi Wan Sournois	Recurring				Guest	36
Lisa Bouwman	Vlinder Blaauw	Recurring					35
Reinout Scholten van Aschat	Roderick Lodewijkx	Recurring				Guest	33
Priscilla Knetemann	Louise Lodewijkx	Recurring				Guest	30
Dorus Witte	Annabel Lodewijkx	Recurring				Guest	30
Mea de Jong	Merel van Kampen	Recurring					25
Jesse Straatman	Remy Morero #1		Guest	Recurring			21
Merijn Straatman	Remy Morero #2		Guest	Recurring			21
Casper Gimbrère	Barry Snijders	Guest		Recurring			17
Gijs Scholten van Aschat	Ernst Scheepmaker van Altena		Recurring				17
Victor Reinier	Anton van Kampen	Recurring					13
Marlies Heuer	Cecile van Buuren			Recurring			13
Alex Klaasen	Yari				Recurring		13
Beppie Melissen	Cor Hogenbirk				Recurring		9
Beppie Melissen	Greet Hogenbirk		Guest	Recurring			5

== Offshoots ==
- The younger days of the four women are chronicled in a prequel-novel.
- The success of Gooische Vrouwen inspired RTL 4 to make a real-life soap about a younger generation of women from the Gooi (De Echte Gooische Meisjes). For the second season, they temporarily relocated to Amsterdam where they were trained to deal with spending cuts. One of the girls went on to document her trip to Peru.
- A feature film, also called Gooische Vrouwen, was released theatrically in 2011.
- A sequel film called Gooische Vrouwen 2 was released in December 2014.

== Trivia ==
Interviewed for TV-guide AVRO Televizier in 2008, actress Cystine Carreon expressed her concern that Tippi Wan (who gave au pairs a bad name) will still haunt her in 20 years time.
