= The Fury (2016 film) =

2016 film

- Theatrical release poster
- Directed by: André van Duren
- Screenplay by: André van Duren
- Based on: De Helleveeg; 2013 novel by A.F. Th. van der Heijden
- Produced by: Matthijs van Heijningen; Guurtje Buddenberg
- Starring: Hannah Hoekstra; Benja Bruijning; Hadewych Minis; Gijs Scholten van Aschat; Anneke Blok; Robert de Hoog; Frank Lammers; Beau Schneider
- Cinematography: Theo Bierkens
- Edited by: Ad Rietvelt
- Music by: Martin Green; Koen van Baal
- Distributed by: Entertainment One Benelux
- Release date: 10 March 2016
- Running time: 116 minutes
- Country: Netherlands
- Language: Dutch
- Box office: $326,189

The Fury (Dutch: De Helleveeg) is a 2016 Dutch drama film directed by André van Duren. It was based on the novel De Helleveeg by A.F. Th. van der Heijden.

== Plot ==
Tiny lives with her domineering parents as a housekeeper of sorts. She is visited and rejected by several suitors, eventually marrying Koos. Over the years she shares many private moments with her nephew Albert, with whom she is close. It is through these moments, and through arguments with her parents and sister, that we learn about Tiny's character and get a glimpse of the secret at the heart of her personality.

== Cast ==
- Hannah Hoekstra as Tiny
- Benja Bruijning as Albert
- Hadewych Minis as Hanny
- Anneke Blok as Grandmother
- Gijs Scholten van Aschat as Grandfather
- Robert de Hoog as Koos
- Frank Lammers as Nico van Dartel

== Accolades ==
At the Golden Calf awards, The Fury won in the categories of Best Actress (Hoekstra) and Best Supporting Actress (Anneke Blok). At the 2016 Montreal World Film Festival, the award for Best Actress went to Hoekstra for The Fury.
