= Bram Fischer (film) =

- Directed by: Jean van de Velde
- Release dates: 2017
- Country: South Africa

Bram Fischer (also titled An Act of Defiance) is a 2017 film about South African lawyer Bram Fischer who defended Nelson Mandela and his co-defendants at the Rivonia Trial of 1963–1964. The film was directed by Jean van de Velde and was featured in several film festivals. The role of Bram Fischer is played by Peter Paul Muller. The film runs for 124 minutes and is in both English and Afrikaans.

== Plot ==
In 1963, Nelson Mandela's inner circle of Black and Jewish activists, known as the Umkhonto we Sizwe, are arrested by the National Party-led government for conspiracy to commit sabotage. The group joins Mandela in prison and is being held indefinitely without formal charge due to the government's 90-day detention law.

Bram Fischer, a sympathetic lawyer and head of the bar, risks his career and freedom to defend Mandela and the men from facing the death sentence. Over the course of the film it is revealed that Bram is also part of Mandela's inner circle and becomes subject to a secret police investigation. The film ends with the trial's conclusion, Mandela and the others get life imprisonment instead of the death penalty, and shortly after Bram is arrested.

The film is an adapted screenplay based on Joel Joffe's book, The State Vs. Nelson Mandela.

== Awards ==
The film won two Golden Calf awards from the Netherlands Film Festival:

- 2017 Golden Calf for Best Actor awarded to Peter Paul Muller for his role as Bram Fischer
- 2017 Golden Calf for Best Script

The film won an award from the UK Jewish Film Festival, the Dayton Jewish Film Festival and the Mill Valley Film Festival.
