= Beppie Melissen =

Dutch actress (born 1951)

- Born: 26 May 1951 (age 73)
- Occupation: Actress
- Awards: Golden Calf for Best Actress 2020 Romy's Salon; Golden Calf Award for Best Supporting Actress 2011 Gooische Vrouwen

Beppie Melissen (born 26 May 1951) is a Dutch actress. She won the Golden Calf for Best Actress award for her role in the 2019 drama film Romy's Salon.

== Career ==
Melissen is known for her role of Cor Hogenbirk in the television series Gooische Vrouwen, the 2011 film Gooische Vrouwen and the 2014 film Gooische Vrouwen 2. For her role in the film Gooische Vrouwen she won the Golden Calf Award for Best Supporting Actress. In 2012, Melissen also hosted the spin-off talk show Villa Morero with Peter Paul Muller and they both interviewed, in character, two guests in each episode. The show was not very successful and did not get a second season.

In 2020, she won the Golden Calf for Best Actress award for her role in the 2019 drama film Romy's Salon.

== Awards ==
- 2011: Golden Calf Award for Best Supporting Actress, Gooische Vrouwen
- 2020: Golden Calf for Best Actress, Romy's Salon

== Selected filmography ==
- 1984: Broken Mirrors (Gebroken spiegels)
- 1992: The Pocket-knife
- 1996: Punk Lawyer
- 2008: Vox populi
- 2011: The Heineken Kidnapping
- 2014: Gift from the Heart
- 2017: Love Revisited
- 2019: Romy's Salon
- 2022: Zwanger & Co
- 2023: Rocco & Sjuul
