= Lovely Liza =

1997 film

- Directed by: Maria Peters
- Written by: Moniek Kramer
- Release date: 1997
- Country: Netherlands
- Language: Dutch

Lovely Liza is a 1997 Dutch film directed by Maria Peters.

== Cast ==
- Gonny Gaakeer ... Liza
- Ingrid Desmet ... Petra
- Esther Leenders ... Daphne
- Stijn Westenend ... Joost
- Marije Idema ... Sanne
- Vincent Moes ... Rik
- Ineke Veenhoven ... Kantinejuf
- Susan Visser ... Nora
- Mike Reus ... Monteur
- Stefan Sasse ... Radio DJ (voice)
