= Jan-Willem van Ewijk =

Dutch film director

- Born: 28 July 1970 (age 54); Delft, Netherlands
- Occupation(s): Film actor, director, screenwriter

Jan-Willem van Ewijk (born 28 July 1970, Delft) is a Dutch film director, actor and screenwriter.

== Biography ==
van Ewijk was born in Delft and spent his youth in the Netherlands and California. He moved back to Delft in 1989, where he studied aviation and aerospace engineering at Delft University of Technology where he graduated as an aircraft engineer. After his studies, he worked at Airbus, Beechcraft, Bombardier Aerospace and Monitor Deloitte and was involved in the start-up of an investment bank. In 2002, he quit his job to dedicate himself to a film career. He started writing the script of Nu. and founded the production house Propellor Film. The film was premiered at the 2006 Netherlands Film Festival, where he received an honorable mention. In 2014, his second feature film, Atlantic., premiered at the Toronto International Film Festival.

== Filmography ==
- Nu. (2006, director, scenario and actor)
- Atlantic. (2014, director, scenario and actor)
- Alpha. (2024, director, scenario and actor)
