= Sophie Hilbrand =

Dutch presenter and journalist

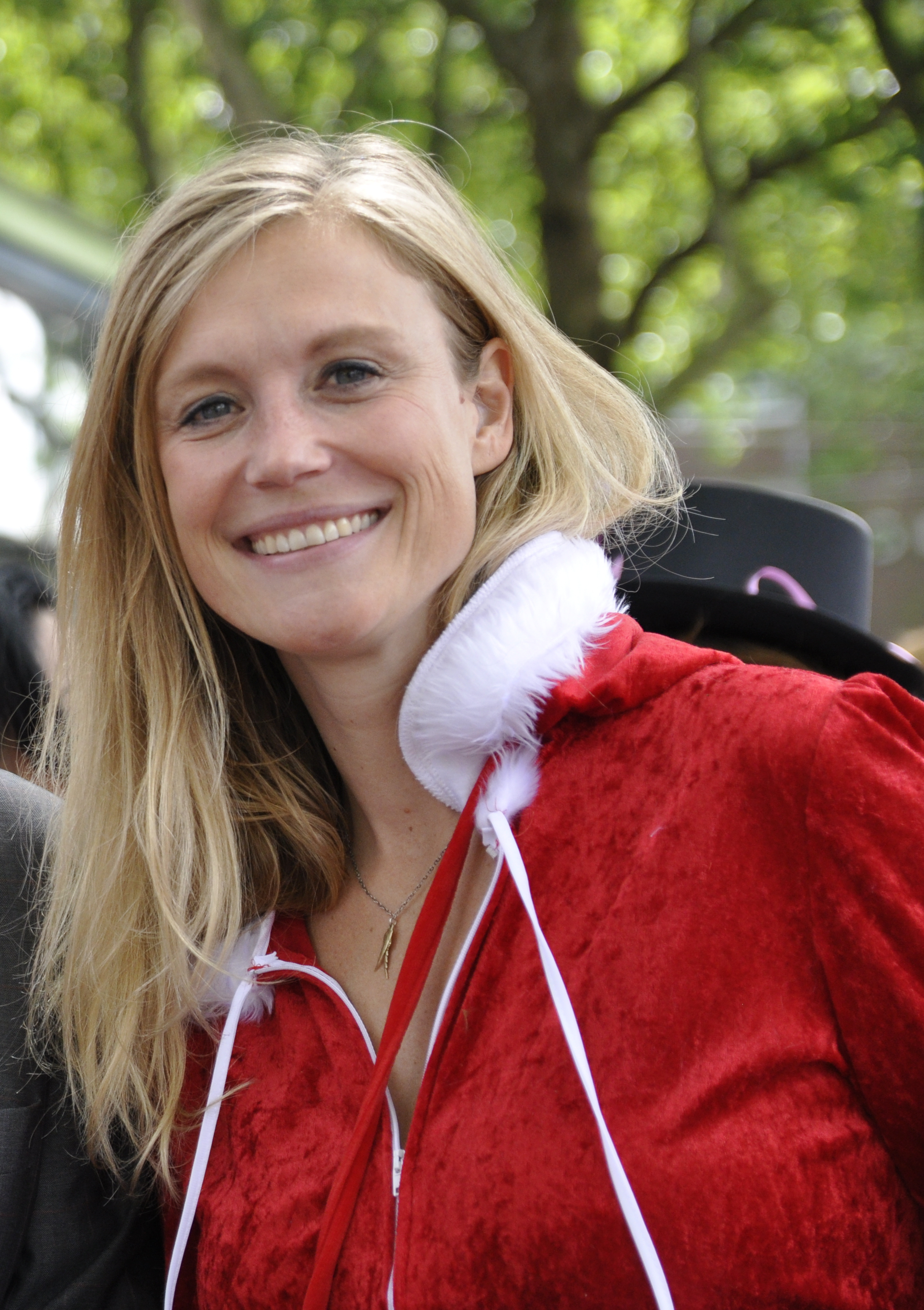
- Sophie Hilbrand in 2012
- Born: Sophie Francine Hilbrand; 5 October 1975 (age 50); Alkmaar, Netherlands
- Occupations: Radio and television presenter

Sophie Francine Hilbrand (born 5 October 1975) is a Dutch television presenter, actress and radio host. She presented multiple television shows, including Spuiten en Slikken, Try Before You Die and Ruben vs. Sophie. She has presented several talk shows, including Khalid & Sophie, Op1 and Bar Laat. Hilbrand also plays a lead role in the 2008 film Summer Heat.

== Career ==
Hilbrand followed a course at De Trap, a private school for acting in Amsterdam. She debuted on SBS6 as part of the 6pack show. In 2004, Hilbrand joined broadcaster BNN.

Hilbrand was one of the presenters of the show Spuiten en Slikken about sexuality and drugs. From 2008 to 2012, Ruben Nicolai and Sophie Hilbrand presented the show Ruben vs. Sophie in which they compete against each other in various challenges.

She presented the 2012 edition of De Nationale IQ Test with Patrick Lodiers and the 2015 edition of the show with Ruben Nicolai. Hilbrand presented the 2014 television show Wij zitten vast in which she looks at life in a youth detention center.

She played a lead role in the 2008 film Summer Heat directed by Monique van de Ven. The film won the Golden Film award after having sold 100,000 tickets. It was Van de Ven's first feature film as director and it is based on the book of the same name by Jan Wolkers.

She presented the 2019 television show It's a man's world about the roles of men and women in society.

For several years, Hilbrand presented the talk show Khalid & Sophie together with Khalid Kasem. The show first aired in 2021 and it was the successor of the talk show De Vooravond presented by Renze Klamer and Fidan Ekiz. In 2024, Jeroen Pauw replaced Khalid Kasem and the show was renamed to Sophie & Jeroen. From 2024 to 2025, Hilbrand and Jeroen Pauw presented the late night talk show Bar Laat. In May 2025, she stopped presenting the show at the end of the second season. The talk show Pauw & De Wit is the successor of Bar Laat, with Jeroen Pauw and Tim de Wit as presenters, and the first episode aired in September 2025.

Hilbrand is in a relationship with actor Waldemar Torenstra and they have two children.
