= Singel 39 =

2019 Dutch film directed by Frank Krom

- Directed by: Frank Krom
- Written by: Marnie Blok
- Screenplay by: Eddy Terstall
- Produced by: Rachel van Bommel
- Cinematography: Joost Rietdijk
- Music by: Jorrit Kleijnen; Jacob Meijer; Alexander Reumers
- Distributed by: Dutch FilmWorks
- Release date: 9 May 2019 (Netherlands)
- Running time: 90 minutes
- Country: Netherlands
- Language: Dutch

Singel 39 is a 2019 Dutch romantic comedy film directed by Frank Krom. The film won the Golden Film award after having sold 100,000 tickets. The film ranks in sixth place in the top 10 of best visited Dutch films of 2019.

The title song of the film was made by Dutch singer-songwriter Douwe Bob. He also makes an appearance in the film as a waiter.

== Plot ==
Cardiac surgeon Monique (Lies Visschedijk) has centered her life around her work. When extraverted gay artist Max (Waldemar Torenstra) moves in next door they develop a friendship which makes her realise there is more to life than work.

== Cast ==
- Lies Visschedijk as Dr. Monique ‘Mo’ Heemstra
- Waldemar Torenstra as Max van Gestel
- Eva van de Wijdeven as Sam Heemstra
- Gerard Cox as Dr. Gijsbertus ‘Gijs’ Heemstra
- Steyn de Leeuwe as Diederik Heemstra
- Fabrice Deville as Jean-Jacques ‘J.J.’
- Loes Haverkort as Marleen
- Douwe Bob as waiter
