= Soy Kroon =

Dutch actor (born 1995)

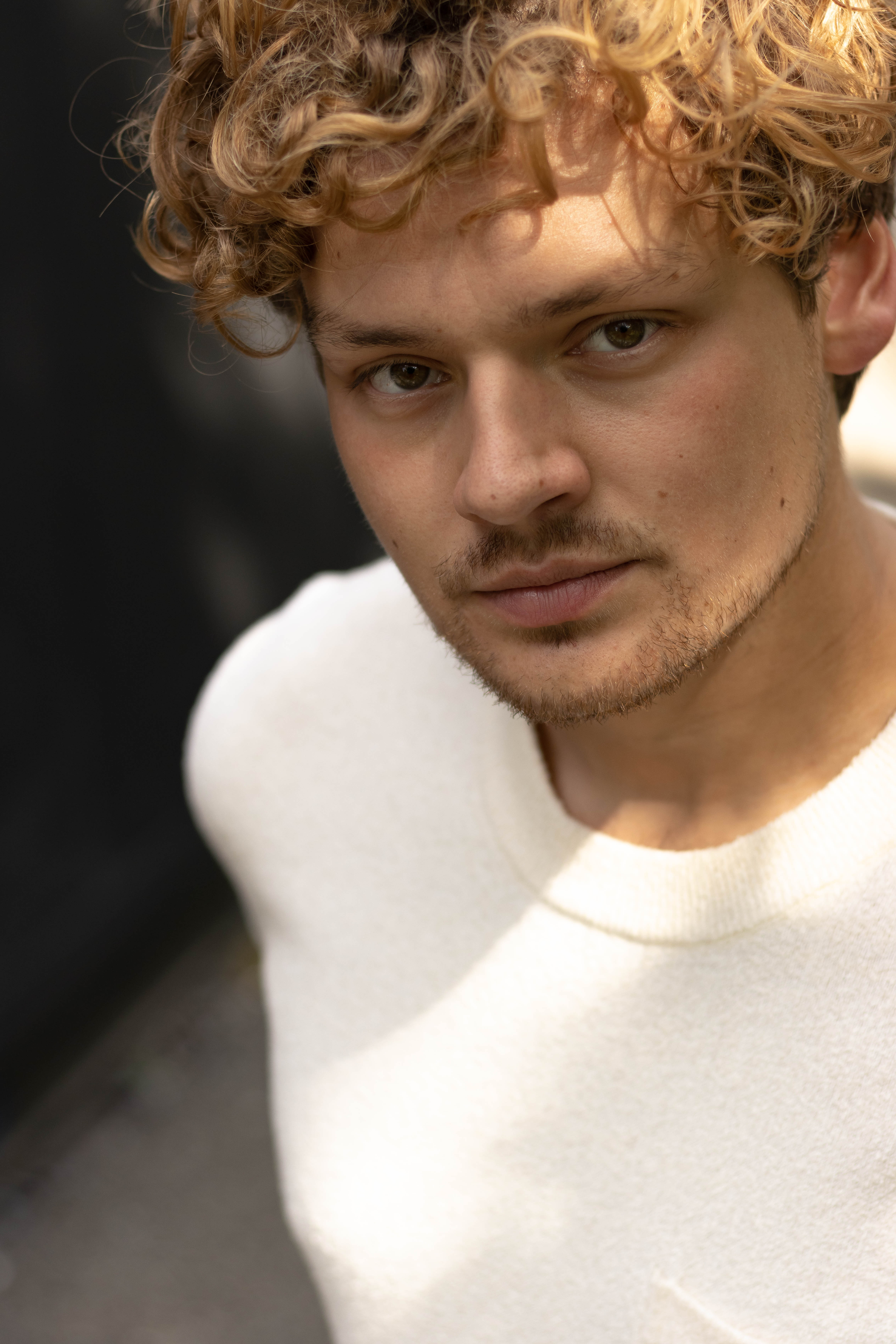
- Kroon in 2020
- Born: 18 June 1995 (age 31); Eindhoven, Netherlands
- Occupation: Actor

Soy Kroon (born 18 June 1995) is a Dutch actor. He is known for his role as Sil Selmhorst in the soap opera Goede tijden, slechte tijden and the spin-off series Nieuwe Tijden. He is also known for his role as Diederik in the Flemish television series Galaxy Park.

== Career ==
=== Film, television and theater ===
At a young age, Kroon moved to Antwerp, Belgium to play in the Flemish television series Galaxy Park. In 2011, he played a role in the musical Oorlogswinter, a story which takes place during the winter of 1944–1945. The musical is based on the book Winter in Wartime by Dutch author Jan Terlouw. He also played a role in other musicals and theater productions, including War Horse, Vamos!, Mamma Mia! and Goodbye, Norma Jeane.

In 2020, Kroon played a role in the television series Hoogvliegers, a coming of age story in which he plays a young man training to become an F-16 pilot. In 2021 and 2022, he played the role of Amon, a pyramid builder, in ONE de musical, which is set during Ancient Egypt. Kroon was nominated for a 2022 Musical Award for his role in the musical.

In 2022, he played the role of Jesus in The Passion, a Dutch Passion Play held every Maundy Thursday since 2011. He was the youngest actor to play the role of Jesus. In the same year, Kroon and Flemish actor Thomas Cammaert played in the stage play Trompettist in Auschwitz, a play based on the true story of trumpet player Lex van Weren who survived his stay in the Auschwitz concentration camp during World War II.

He appeared in the 2021 film Liefde Zonder Grenzen directed by Appie Boudellah and Aram van de Rest. He also appeared in the 2022 film Costa!! directed by Jon Karthaus. Kroon and Abbey Hoes released the song Samen Met Jou, as can be heard in the film, about a week after the film's release after popular demand.

Kroon won the Televizier-Ster Talent award at the 2022 Gouden Televizier-Ring Gala.

In 2023, he played the lead role in the play Nu ik je zie based on the book of the same name by Merlijn Kamerling. He also appears in the 2023 Netflix film Oei, ik groei! directed by Appie Boudellah and Aram van de Rest. Kroon and Dieuwertje Blok presented the 2023 Concert on the Amstel in Amsterdam, Netherlands on Liberation Day (5 May). In August 2023, he presented the Kinderprinsengrachtconcert held on the same day as the Prinsengrachtconcert. He also presented the television show Sketch Studio in which children compete to create the best drawings. Kroon was also one of the jury members for the Netherlands at the Junior Eurovision Song Contest 2023 held in France.

In 2024, Kroon and Johnny Kraaijkamp jr. performed the comedy theater show Kraaij & Kroon - Papadag bestaat niet. Kroon also appears in the 2024 film Loving Bali directed by Johan Nijenhuis. He presented the second season of Sketch Studio in 2024 and 2025. He also presented the Kinderprinsengrachtconcert in 2024.

Kroon played a role in the war musical 40-45 from 2024 to 2026. In August 2025, he presented the show CultuurCrush, a show about culture in the Netherlands. In December 2025, Kroon played the role of Joseph in the live televised performance De kerststal van Nederland. Kroon is also the presenter of the 2026 game show Watch Your Back which airs on NPO Start. In February and March 2026, Kroon and Hans Schiffers presented Arbeidsvitaminen Quiz, a music quiz television show in celebration of 80 years of the radio show Arbeidsvitaminen. Kroon and Thomas Cammaert play roles in the 2026 musical Soldaat in Verzet. In 2026, he plays the lead role in the musical Voor Haar - de Frans Halsema Musical about Dutch cabaret artist and singer Frans Halsema.

=== Singing ===
In 2026, he released the song Langzaam Haasten.

=== Television appearances ===
In 2020, Kroon appeared in the photography game show Het Perfecte Plaatje in which contestants compete to create the best photo in various challenges. His exit in the show generated discussion and, in the next season, the producers of the show modified the rules to allow the jury to keep someone in the game. In 2022, he performed as drag queen Dee Dee Sky in the drag queen show Make Up Your Mind. He also won the final of that season of the show. In that same year, he appeared in the quiz shows Weet Ik Veel and De Quiz van het Jaar.

Kroon appeared in the 23rd season of the television show Wie is de Mol?. He left the show in the episode before the final and he finished in third place. He won the 2024-2025 season of the television show The Masked Singer. Kroon also appeared in the final episode of the 2025-2026 season of The Masked Singer.

== Personal life ==
Kroon is in a relationship with Dutch actress and presenter Holly Mae Brood. They met in 2016 at an audition for the television series Nieuwe Tijden. In 2017, Kroon and Brood appeared in an episode of the game show De Jongens tegen de Meisjes. In 2018, they both won the fourth season the Dutch television show Dance Dance Dance.

Kroon is an only child but he was once a twin. His parents separated when he was 15 years old.

== Awards ==
- Televizier-Ster Talent (2022)

== Filmography ==
=== Film ===
- Sinterklaas en de vlucht door de lucht (2018)
- Waar is het grote boek van Sinterklaas? (2019)
- K3: Dans van de farao (2020)
- Zwaar Verliefd! 2 (also known as Something About Love, Heavily in Love 2)
- Liefde Zonder Grenzen (2021)
- Costa!! (2022)
- Oei, ik groei! (2023)
- Verliefd op Bali (2024)

=== Television ===
- Lisa's Missie (2009)
- Tien Torens Diep (2010)
- Galaxy Park (2011 – 2014)
- Goede tijden, slechte tijden (2016 – 2018)
- Nieuwe Tijden (2016 – 2018)
- Hoogvliegers (2020)

=== As presenter ===
- De Magische Auto (2021 – 2023)
- Sketch Studio (2023 – present)
- Bouwer Power (2023)
- CultuurCrush (2025)
- Watch Your Back (2026, NPO Start)
- Arbeidsvitaminen Quiz (2026)

=== As contestant ===
- De Jongens tegen de Meisjes (2017)
- Dance Dance Dance (2018)
- Het Perfecte Plaatje (2020)
- Make Up Your Mind (2022)
- Weet Ik Veel (2022)
- De Quiz van het Jaar (2022)
- Wie is de Mol? (2023)
- Secret Duets (2023)
- The Masked Singer (2024 – 2025)
