= Yes Nurse! No Nurse! =

2002 Dutch comedy musical film

- Theatrical release poster
- Directed by: Pieter Kramer
- Screenplay by: Pieter Kramer; Frank Houtappels
- Based on: Ja zuster, nee zuster by: Annie M.G. Schmidt; Harry Bannink
- Produced by: Burny Bos; Michiel de Rooij; Sabine Veenendaal
- Starring: Loes Luca; Paul de Leeuw; Paul R. Kooij
- Cinematography: Piotr Kukla
- Edited by: Elja de Lange
- Music by: Pelle Bolander; Raymund van Santen
- Production companies: Bos Bros. Film-TV Productions; AVRO
- Distributed by: Warner Bros. Pictures
- Release date: 3 October 2002
- Running time: 100 minutes
- Country: Netherlands
- Language: Dutch
- Budget: ƒ6.5 million
- Box office: $2.7 million

Yes Nurse! No Nurse! (Dutch: Ja Zuster, Nee Zuster) is a 2002 Dutch comedy musical film written and directed by Pieter Kramer and co-written by Frank Houtappels, based on the 1960s television show by Annie M.G. Schmidt and Harry Bannink.

The film was released in the Netherlands on 3 October 2002 by Warner Bros. Pictures. It received a Golden Film (75,000 visitors) and a Platinum Film (200,000 visitors).

== Cast ==
- Loes Luca as Zuster Klivia
- Paul de Leeuw as Wouter
- Paul R. Kooij as Buurman Boordevol
- Tjitske Reidinga as Jet
- Waldemar Torenstra as Gerrit
- Edo Brunner as Bertus
- Lennart Vader as Bobby
- Beppe Costa as Ingenieur
- Frits Lambrechts as Opa
- Pierre van Duijl as Zorbo de Griek
- Raymonde de Kuyper as De Drie Trudies
- Trudy de Jong as De Drie Trudies
- Trudie Lute as De Drie Trudies
- Olga Zuiderhoek as Mevrouw de Rechter
- Henk Stuurman as Mijnheer Azalea
- Henny Westerveld as Mevrouw Azalea
- Arjan Ederveen as Choreograaf
- Dorijn Curvers as Koningin Beatrix

== Production ==
Before the release of the film, The Netherlands Red Cross criticized the use of the Red Cross emblem in the film, stating that it violates the international rules, which protects victims and aid workers worldwide. A settlement was later reached, with the crosses being recolored to blue in the film's advertising and a disclaimer being added about the incorrect use of the Red Cross in the film.

== Soundtrack ==
All tracks are written by Harry Bannink.

Track listing
No.	Title	Performer(s)	Length
1.	"Ouverture"	Loes Luca	3.19
2.	"Met U Onder Een Paraplu"	Tjitske Reidinga; Han Van Eijk; Jody Pijper; Dian Senders; Ingrid Simons	3.07
3.	"Aan De Trapeze"	Loes Luca	2.43
4.	"Duifies, Duifies"	Han Van Eijk	2.22
5.	"Stroei-Voei"	Pierre van Duijl; Loes Luca	3:27
6.	"De Twips"	Jody Pijper; Dian Senders	2:47
7.	"De Jongens Van De Roeivereniging"		2:21
8.	"Ladumaar Meneer"	Paul de Leeuw; Jody Pijper	1:57
9.	"M'n Opa"		3:17
10.	"Jij Hebt Gelogen, Gerrit"		2:23
11.	"Ik Heb 'T Bewijs"	Paul R. Kooij	1:14
12.	"Geld, Alles Kan Je Kopen Voor Geld"	Paul R. Kooij	2:29
13.	"Ja Zuster, Nee Zuster (Finale)"		1:23

== Release ==
=== Critical response ===
The film received mixed reviews from critics.

=== Home media ===
The film was released on DVD and VHS by Warner Home Video on 2 May 2003. It later received a second DVD release on 8 November 2011 by Video/Film Express.

=== Accolades ===
Accolades received by Yes Nurse! No Nurse!
Year	Award	Category	Result	Ref.
2003	San Francisco International Lesbian and Gay Film Festival	Frameline Audience Award – Best Feature	Won	
