= The Girl with the Red Hair (film) =

1981 film

- Theatrical release poster
- Directed by: Ben Verbong
- Written by: Ben Verbong; Pieter de Vos; Theun de Vries
- Produced by: Haig Balian; Chris Brouwer
- Starring: Renée Soutendijk; Loes Luca
- Cinematography: Theo van de Sande
- Edited by: Ton de Graaff
- Music by: Nicola Piovani
- Distributed by: Meteor Film (Netherlands); United Artists Classics (United States)
- Release date: 17 September 1981
- Running time: 110 minutes
- Country: Netherlands
- Language: Dutch

The Girl with the Red Hair (Dutch: Het meisje met het rode haar) is a 1981 Dutch drama film directed by Ben Verbong. It is based on the biography of resistance fighter Hannie Schaft. It was entered into the 32nd Berlin International Film Festival.

== Cast ==
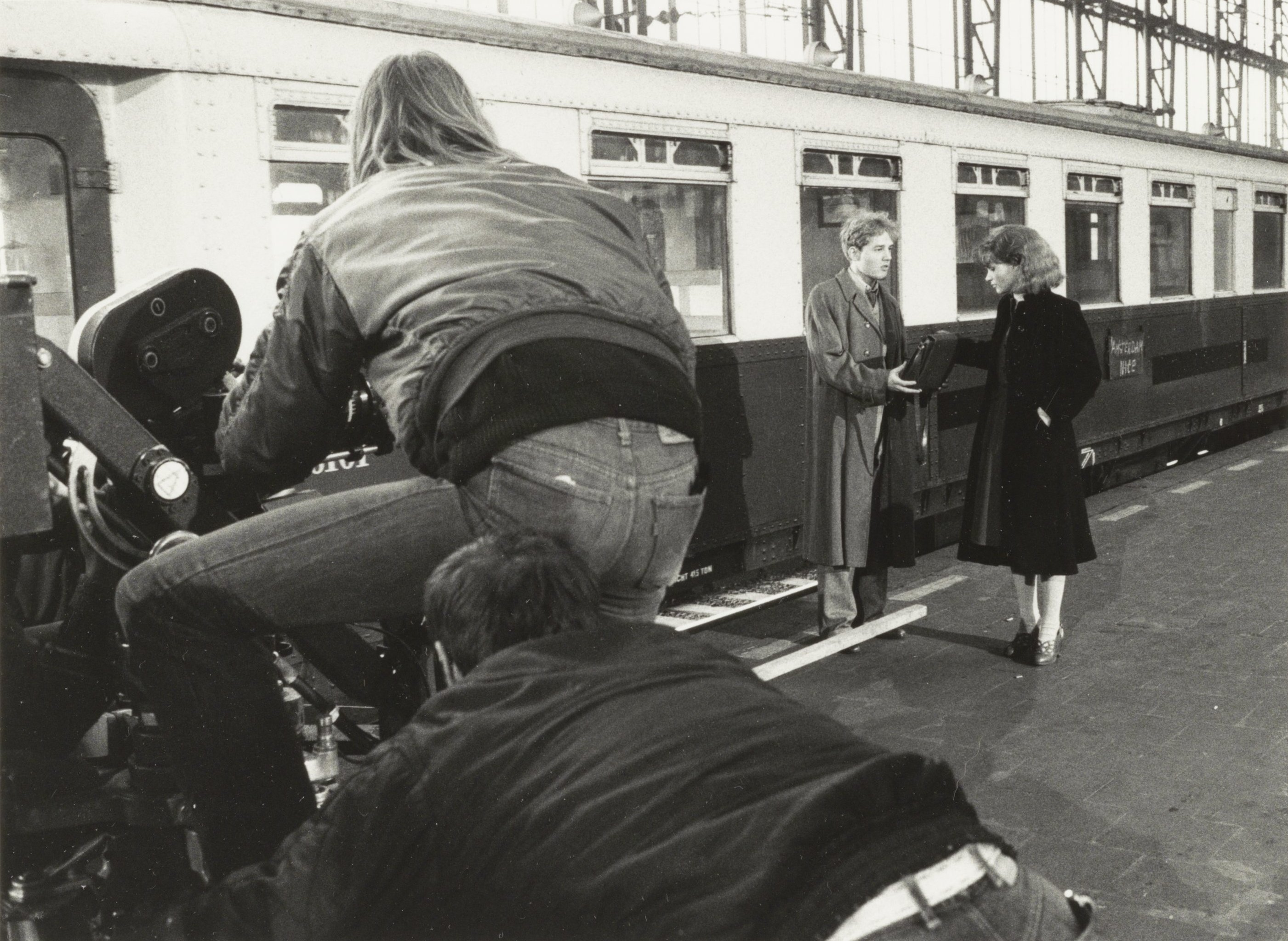
Johan Leysen and Renée Soutendijk on set

- Renée Soutendijk as Hannie Schaft
- Peter Tuinman as Hugo
- Loes Luca as An
- Johan Leysen as Frans
- Robert Delhez as Floor
- Ada Bouwman as Tinka
- Lineke Rijxman as Judith
- Maria de Booy as Moeder
- Henk Rigters as Vader
- Adrian Brine as SD-er
- Chris Lomme as Mevrouw de Ruyter
- Lou Landré as Otto Schaaf
- Jan Retèl as Professor
- Elsje Scherjon as Carlien

== Reception ==
The film "has been criticized for taking many liberties with the facts surrounding this historical resistance fighter". However, Soutendijk's performance was generally praised.
