= Hearts of Bali =

2024 Dutch film directed by Johan Nijenhuis

- Directed by: Johan Nijenhuis
- Distributed by: Dutch FilmWorks
- Release date: 28 January 2024
- Country: Netherlands
- Language: Dutch

Hearts of Bali (Dutch: Verliefd op Bali), also known as Loving Bali, is a 2024 Dutch romantic comedy film directed by Johan Nijenhuis. The film won the Golden Film award after having sold 100,000 tickets.

Jim Bakkum, Wieteke van Dort and Nadja Hüpscher play roles in the film. Mingus Dagelet, Edwin Jonker and Soy Kroon also play roles in the film. Principal photography began in April 2023. The film is the sequel to the films Verliefd op Ibiza (2013) and Cuban Love (2019). The film finished in third place in the list of best visited Dutch films of 2024.
