= Arbeidsvitaminen =

- Genre: Musical request show
- Country of origin: The Netherlands
- Language: Dutch
- Syndicates: AVROTROS
- Original release: 19 February 1946

Arbeidsvitaminen ("Work vitamins") is a popular-music radio show produced by the AVROTROS broadcasting association for NPO Radio 5 in the Netherlands. The first edition of the show went on air on 19 February 1946 at Radio Nederland in den Overgangstijd (the radio which existed shortly after World War II) making it the longest-running radio programme in the Netherlands and one of the longest-lasting in the world. On 1 May 2006 the programme received a Guinness Book of World Records award for being the longest-lived nationally broadcast radio show in history. This status is debatable, since a number of other radio programmes, most notably in Norway and the United Kingdom, have been on the air since the 1920s.

Arbeidsvitaminen was created as a late-morning entertainment show by Jaap den Daas, a programme maker for AVRO and also the man behind such other classic shows of Dutch radio as De Bonte Dinsdagavondtrein (The colourful Tuesday evening train) and Hersengymnastiek. (Brain gymnastics) Originally each edition of the show focused on a single company or organisation. The employees were asked to create their Top 10 list of favourite records and these were played during the show, and the head of the company or organization was featured as "Boss of the Day". After 11.00 a guest celebrity (usually someone in the news that week) was interviewed in the show. For example, in 2004 Dutch crown prince Willem-Alexander was a guest. The show also had special theme weeks in which humanitarian organisations were promoted. A recurring item was "One Minute", a collaboration with the Dutch TV show "Opsporing Verzocht", (Investigation Wanted) where witnesses of a certain crime were asked to contact the radio station in case they could provide the investigators with more information.

Since its move to NPO Radio 5 on 6 September 2010 Arbeidsvitaminen has become exclusively a record request show. In 2006 a compilation CD was released featuring the most frequently requested music in the programme's 60-year history. At the same time a CD-ROM, Mega Hitparade, was issued, summarizing the show's playlists from February 1946 to May 1957.

In February and March 2026, Soy Kroon and Hans Schiffers presented Arbeidsvitaminen Quiz, a music quiz television show in celebration of 80 years of the radio show.
