= FL 19,99 =

- Theatrical release poster
- Directed by: Mart Dominicus
- Written by: Helena van der Meulen; Mart Dominicus
- Produced by: Els Vandevorst
- Cinematography: Rogier Stoffers
- Edited by: Menno Boerema
- Music by: Paul M. van Brugge
- Production companies: Motel Films; Isabella Films; VPRO
- Distributed by: RCV Film Distribution
- Release date: 8 October 1998
- Running time: 90 minutes
- Country: Netherlands
- Language: Dutch

FL 19,99 is a 1998 Dutch comedy film directed by Mart Dominicus. It ran at the Rotterdam Film Festival. The distribution was by the project Route 2000, a forerunner of Telefilm

== Plot ==
An Amsterdam hotel runs a millennium offer. People can stay overnight for only fl 19,99 (€9). It's a big success, and the hotel is quickly booked. The film follows the people living on one of the floors coming in and going out and the things they encounter.

== Cast ==
- Thomas Acda
- Jacqueline Blom
- Elsie de Braauw
- Lenny Breederveld
- Tjebbo Gerritsma
- Albert de Haan
- Mischa Hulshof
- Michiel de Jong
- Peggy Jane de Schepper
- Peter Paul Muller
- Hero Muller
- Dimme Treurniet
- Jeroen Willems
