= Man, Vrouw, Hondje =

1999 film

- Written by: Olivier Nilsson-Julien, Nicole van Kilsdonk
- Directed by: Nicole van Kilsdonk
- Country of origin: Netherlands
- Original language: Dutch

Production
- Running time: 88 minutes

Original release
- Release: 12 May 1999

Man, Vrouw, Hondje is a 1999 Dutch film directed by Nicole van Kilsdonk.

== Cast ==
- Anneke Blok
- Kees Brusse ... Max
- Cees Geel ... Vrachtwagenchauffeur
- Job Gosschalk ... Homo 2
- Micha Hulshof
- Ad Knippels
- Roeland Kooijmans ... Reporter
- Ricky Koole
- Joep Onderdelinden ... Homo
- Allard van der Scheer
- Marisa Van Eyle
- Susan Visser ... Vrouw vrachtwagenchauffeur
- Nico de Vries ... Hans
- Dirk Zeelenberg
- René van Zinnicq Bergman
