= Gooische Vrouwen 2 =

2014 Dutch film directed by Will Koopman

- Theatrical release poster
- Directed by: Will Koopman
- Screenplay by: Frank Houtappels
- Story by: Linda de Mol
- Based on: Gooische Vrouwen
- Produced by: John de Mol; Alex Doff; Wendy van Veen
- Cinematography: Tom Erisman
- Edited by: Sandor Soeteman
- Distributed by: Independent Films
- Release date: 4 December 2014 (Netherlands)
- Running time: 106 minutes
- Country: Netherlands
- Language: Dutch
- Box office: 2 million admissions (Netherlands)

Gooische Vrouwen 2 is a 2014 Dutch film directed by Will Koopman. The film is the sequel of the 2011 film Gooische Vrouwen and both films are based on the Gooische Vrouwen television series. The film was released on 4 December 2014 and went on to become the best-visited film in the Netherlands in 2014. The film won the Golden Film award after having sold 100,000 tickets and on 28 December 2014 also the Diamond Film for reaching 1 million tickets. It went on to have more than 2 million admissions, making it one of the ten most popular Dutch films of all time. In 2015, the film won the Rembrandt Award.

== Plot ==
Cheryl, Anouk, and Roelien are looking forward to Claire’s return from Burkina Faso. When she gets back after running out of moneh, it turns out she’s changed quite a bit. She’s rented out her own house, but is allowed to stay with Cheryl for the time being. She has become a vegetarian and has fallen in love with Komo from Burkina Faso. Komo then comes over. He eats with his hands, which Cheryl’s young son Remy starts to imitate, despite his mother's protests.

Cheryl has had enough of Martin’s cheating, this time with the young Daphne, and breaks up with him. When Daphne dances with another man and refuses to be bossed around by Martin, who wants to take her home, their relationship cools off. Martin tries to make amends with Cheryl, but this doesn’t work. Anouk still loves men and food. Under pressure from her friends, she breaks up with a married man with a family.

Roelien marries Evert. Just as she is about to say “I do,” she steps away briefly to give the dog some water. Evert dies that same day during the wedding dinner after choking on a piece of meat. Komo’s customs and superstitions at the wedding and cremation get on Claire’s nerves, despite his seemingly accurate warning about what brings bad luck, and Komo returns to his home country. Evert had wished for his ashes to be scattered at a specific, hard-to-reach location in the mountains of Austria. Together, the friends go there to fulfill his last wish.

The first and last parts of the film take place several decades in the future, when they are old. Martin has dementia and lives in a nursing home, but at Cheryl’s encouragement, he sings one last time in her garden for the fans gathered there. Remy, now an adult, escorts him to the microphone.

== Cast ==
- Linda de Mol as Cheryl Morero
- Tjitske Reidinga as Claire van Kampen
- Susan Visser as Anouk Verschuur
- Lies Visschedijk as Roelien Grootheeze
- Peter Paul Muller as Martin Morero
- Leopold Witte as Evert Lodewijkx
- Derek de Lint as Dokter Rossi
- Alex Klaasen as Yari
- Beppie Melissen as Tante Cor
- Elise van 't Laar as Daphne
- Stefan Rokebrand as Alfons
- Djédjé Apali as Komo
- Kees Hulst as Olivier Grootheeze
- Reinout Scholten van Aschat as Roderick Lodewijkx
- Priscilla Knetemann as Louise Lodewijkx
