= Alpha. =

2024 drama film

- Theatrical release poster
- Directed by: Jan-Willem van Ewijk
- Written by: Jan-Willem van Ewijk
- Produced by: Frank Hoeve
- Starring: Reinout Scholten van Aschat; Gijs Scholten van Aschat
- Cinematography: Douwe Hennink
- Edited by: Eline Bakker; Sander Vos
- Music by: Ella van der Woude
- Release dates: 4 September 2024 (Venice); 13 February 2025 (Netherlands)
- Countries: Netherlands; Switzerland; Slovenia
- Languages: Dutch; German; English

Alpha. is a 2024 adventure drama film written and directed by Jan-Willem van Ewijk. The film premiered in the Giornate degli Autori sidebar of the 81st Venice International Film Festival , in which it won the Europa Cinemas Label Award.

The film also won the Award for Best Film in the Coop! competition at the 2025 Ostend Film Festival.

== Cast ==
- Reinout Scholten van Aschat as Rein
- Gijs Scholten van Aschat as Gijs
- Pia Amofa-Antwi as Laura
- Daria Fuchs as Anna
- Julien Genoud as Julien
- Kaija Ledergerber as Juna
