= Peter Paul Muller =

Dutch actor and voice actor (born 1965)

- Born: 30 May 1965 (age 60); Rotterdam, Netherlands
- Occupations: Actor, voice actor
- Years active: 1992 – present
- Father: Hero Muller
- Awards: Golden Calf for Best Actor 2017 Bram Fischer; Golden Calf for Best Supporting Actor 2011 Gooische Vrouwen

Peter Paul Muller (born 30 May 1965) is a Dutch actor and voice actor. In 2017, Muller won the Golden Calf for Best Actor award for his role as South African lawyer Bram Fischer in the film Bram Fischer.

== Career ==
=== Television ===
Muller made his debut on television in the 1994 television series Kats & Co. Muller also played a role in the television series Dag Juf, tot morgen (1994), Zwarte Sneeuw (1996) and Oud geld (1998 and 1999).

Muller played the role of Mark in All Stars (1999 – 2001) with the mostly the same cast as the 1997 film All Stars by Jean van de Velde. Van de Velde and Muller first worked together for the 1997 All Stars film and they ended up working together in many later television and film projects.

Muller appeared in three episodes of Baantjer in different roles. In 2005, Muller also appeared in episodes of Grijpstra & De Gier and Keyzer & De Boer Advocaten.

From 2005 till 2009 he played the role of singer Martin Morero in the comedy-drama series Gooische Vrouwen. He also played this role in the 2011 film Gooische Vrouwen and the 2014 sequel Gooische Vrouwen 2. Muller also hosted the spin-off talk show Villa Morero with Beppie Melissen and they both interviewed, in character, two guests in each episode. The show was not very successful and did not get a second season.

Other series in which Muller played a role are Vechtershart, Meisje van plezier, Flikken Rotterdam and Hollands Hoop.

In 2019, he played the role of politician Morten Mathijsen in the drama series Morten based on the book series De Morten by Anna Levander, pseudonym of Dominique van der Heyde and Annet de Jong. The series is directed by Jean van de Velde and Barbara Jurgens.

=== Film ===
Muller made his film debut in the 1992 film Heading for England by André van Duren. Like Muller, many actors in this film were at the beginning of their acting career and became well-known actors in later years, including Roef Ragas, Thomas Acda, Cees Geel and Bianca Krijgsman.

Muller played roles in several films, including All Stars (1997), Het 14e kippetje (1998), fl 19,99 (1998), Father's Affair (2003), The Preacher (2004), Love is All (2007) and Wiplala (2014).

In 2011, Muller won the Golden Calf for Best Supporting Actor award at the Netherlands Film Festival for his role in the film Gooische Vrouwen. Muller did not attend the award ceremony and refused the award stating that he is not interested in it. Muller donated the award to the Emma Children's Hospital in Amsterdam instead.

In 2017, Muller won the Golden Calf for Best Actor award for his role as South African lawyer Bram Fischer in the film Bram Fischer. Muller did accept the award at the award ceremony but did not take it home afterwards. Muller gave it to film director Jean van de Velde instead, who won the Golden Calf for Best Script award for this film.

He also appeared in the 2021 film Alles op Tafel, a remake of the 2016 Italian film Perfetti sconosciuti. In 2022, he appeared in the film Piece of My Heart directed by Dana Nechushtan.

Muller also provided the voice for characters in the Dutch version of several films, including Incredibles 2.

== Personal life ==
Muller is a son of actor Hero Muller. Muller and his father both played a role in the film fl 19,99 (1998).

== Awards ==
- 2011: Golden Calf for Best Supporting Actor, Gooische Vrouwen
- 2017: Golden Calf for Best Actor, Bram Fischer
