= Summer Heat (2008 film) =

- Theatrical release poster
- Directed by: Monique van de Ven
- Written by: Edwin de Vries
- Based on: Zomerhitte by Jan Wolkers
- Produced by: Ate de Jong
- Starring: Sophie Hilbrand; Waldemar Torenstra
- Cinematography: Lex Brand
- Edited by: Job ter Burg
- Music by: Christian Henson
- Distributed by: Independent Films
- Release date: 20 March 2008
- Running time: 96 minutes
- Country: Netherlands
- Language: Dutch
- Box office: € 2,067,446

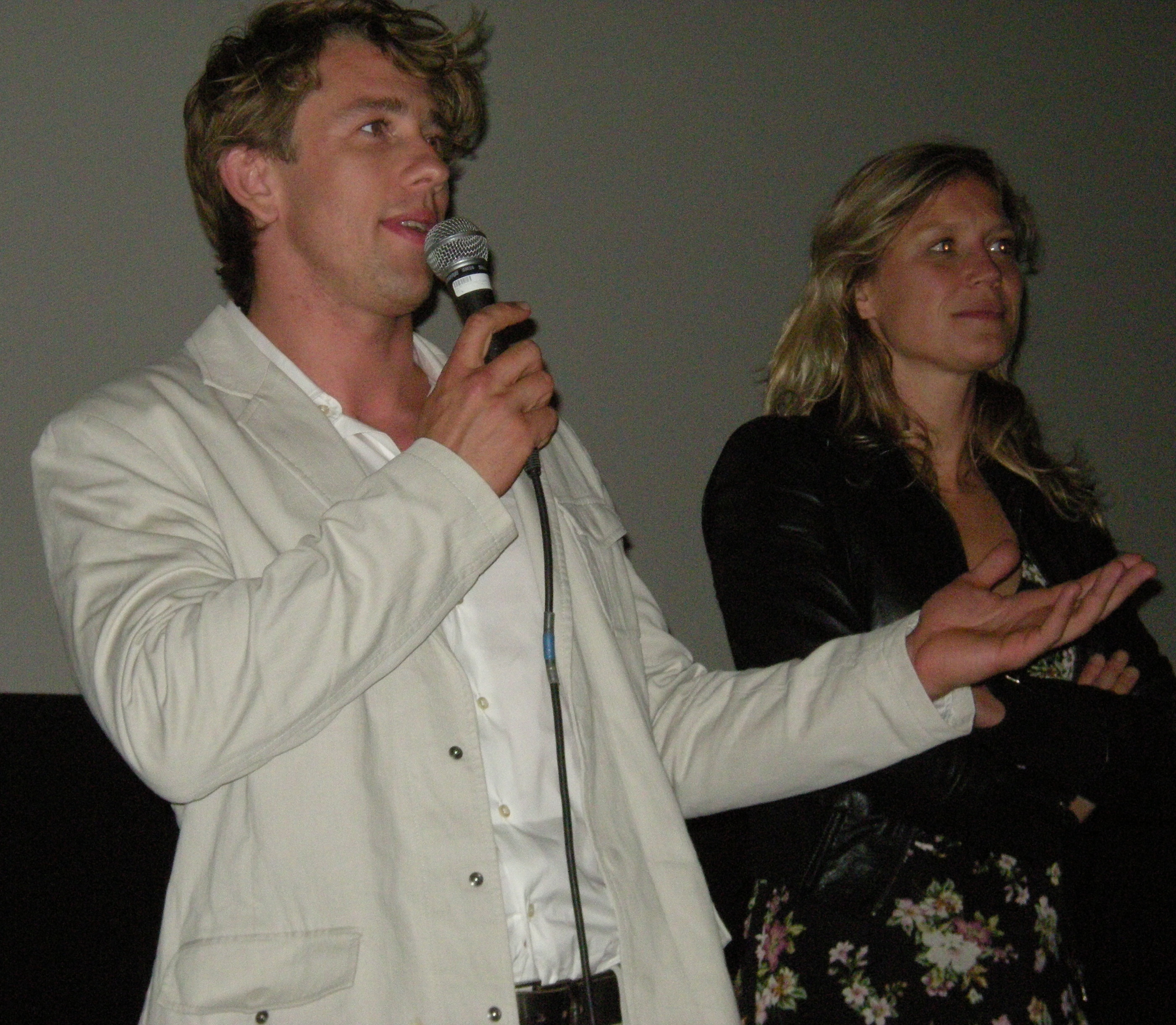
Waldemar Torenstra & Sophie Hilbrand attending a showing of Zomerhitte at the Seattle International Film Festival, 2008.

Summer Heat (Dutch: Zomerhitte) is a 2008 film directed by Monique van de Ven. Her first feature-length film, it is based on the 2005 book-week giveaway novella by Jan Wolkers. Wolkers, who died while the film was in post-production, also authored the story for van de Ven's first film as an actress, Turkish Delight (1973).

== Plot ==
Photographer Bob Griffioen (Waldemar Torenstra) is in Afghanistan with his girlfriend when they witness rebels attacking a car. His girlfriend wants to flee the scene but he wants to photograph it, resulting in his girlfriend being killed. (This part is not in the book.)

Later, Bob is doing nature photography in the dunes near a beach on the island of Texel. The beach appears to be deserted, until he sees the naked Kathleen (Sophie Hilbrand) emerging from the sea. He boldly photographs her. A little disturbed she asks whether he has photographed her. He denies it, but she sees the photographs on his camera screen. She says he should undress too because it is a nude beach, just like one should be dressed when in the street. He takes off his shirt only.

Kathleen is paid by an older man (who we later discover belongs to a drug gang) for allowing him to watch her fingering herself. She also socialises with the gang. Bob meddles with the gang's affairs and uninvitedly comes to their parties. This causes the gang to get hostile to him: they throw him into the water, damage his belongings in the house where he is staying, and kidnap him. The kidnapper is accidentally killed. Bob throws him into a shallow lake in the dunes, with a heavy bag with drugs strapped to his body to keep him underwater.

Bob and Kathleen have sex, although he is not sure on which side she is, especially when she steals the gun Bob had taken from his kidnapper. Later she lies to Bob that she has got rid of it.

Kathleen refuses fingering herself in front of the older man anymore, after which he forces her, threatening with a gun. A moment later he has been shot. According to Kathleen it was suicide.

Bob and Kathleen are both kidnapped, but due to the gun Kathleen has with her they can escape. Bob now trusts her. Together they flee the island: Kathleen pretends to have a stroke (even toward Bob), and they are taken off the island by a medical emergency helicopter.

Later they live together abroad, and a suitcase with money is brought to them as a reward for what they did on Texel.

== Release ==
The film was released on Blu-ray and DVD by Warner Home Video on 27 August 2008.
