= Romy's Salon =

2019 film

- Theatrical release poster
- Directed by: Mischa Kamp
- Screenplay by: Tamara Bos
- Based on: Kapsalon Romy by Tamara Bos
- Produced by: Burny Bos; Eefje Smulders
- Starring: Vita Heijmen; Beppie Melissen
- Cinematography: Melle van Essen
- Edited by: Sander Vos
- Music by: Jacob Meijer
- Production companies: BosBros; AVROTROS
- Distributed by: Cinemien
- Release date: 18 July 2019
- Running time: 90 minutes
- Countries: Netherlands; Germany
- Languages: Dutch; Danish; German

Romy's Salon (Dutch: Kapsalon Romy) is a 2019 Dutch-German drama film directed by Mischa Kamp. It was based on the book of the same name by Tamara Bos. In July 2019, it was shortlisted as one of the nine films in contention to be the Dutch entry for the Academy Award for Best International Feature Film at the 92nd Academy Awards, but it was not selected.

In 2020, director Mischa Kamp won the Golden Calf for Best Director award at the Netherlands Film Festival. Beppie Melissen won the Golden Calf for Best Actress award for her role in the film and Noortje Herlaar won the Golden Calf for Best Supporting Actress for her role in the film. Tamara Bos won the Golden Calf for Best Script award.

== Cast ==
- Vita Heijmen as Romy
- Beppie Melissen as Stine Rasmussen
- Noortje Herlaar as Margot
- Guido Pollemans as Willem
