= De Lint (family) =

- family
- Country: Netherlands
- Founded: 17th century
- Cadet branches: De Lind van Wijngaarden

De Lint family is the name of a Dutch patrician family.

== History ==
The family history starts with Adriaan de Lint who was born in 1600 in Klundert. His descendants played an important role in the Protestant church and the local government of the North Brabant province.

== Notable members ==
- Derek de Lint, actor

== Bibliography ==
- Nederland's Patriciaat 29. 1943. pp. 275–290.
