= Time to Spare =

- Theatrical release poster
- Directed by: Job Gosschalk
- Written by: Job Gosschalk
- Starring: Paul de Leeuw; Karina Smulders
- Edited by: Job ter Burg
- Production companies: NL Film & TV; Kemna & Zoenen; AVRO
- Distributed by: Independent Films
- Release date: 14 April 2011
- Running time: 96 minutes
- Country: Netherlands
- Language: Dutch
- Budget: € 1.8 million

Time to Spare (Dutch: Alle tijd) is a Dutch film directed by Job Gosschalk and starring Paul de Leeuw and Karina Smulders. The film is based on the original screenplay by Job Gosschalk.

The film released in the Netherlands on 14 April 2011.

== Plot ==
Maarten (de Leeuw), a gay music teacher, and his sister Molly (Smulders) have a special relationship with each other. When their parents died, Maarten took over the upbringing of his little sister. He is supported by his best friend Reina (Lineke Rijxman). Because Maarten spent so much time caring for Molly, he effaced himself at the time. One day, Molly announces that she is going to live with her boyfriend Teun (Teun Luikx). Maarten is then confronted with empty nest syndrome.

Maarten meets Arthur (Alwin Pulinckx), who doubts that he is gay. Teun cheats, so Molly also cheats with veterinarian Melvin. She becomes pregnant, but she doesn't know who is the father and doesn't want to know. Teun doesn't want any more contact with her.

Molly gets incurable breast cancer, and goes back to live with Maarten again. Melvin is also with her. Molly gives birth to a healthy son, Finn. Maarten promises her he will care for and raise Finn. Teun only comes along after Molly's death.

The film was shot on locations in The Hague, including the Appeltheater, Den Haag Hollands Spoor railway station and the Hofvijver.

== Cast ==
- Paul de Leeuw as Maarten
- Karina Smulders as Molly
- Lineke Rijxman as Reina
- Teun Luijkx as Teun
- Alwin Pulinckx as Arthur
- Christopher Parren as Melvin

== Background ==
Years before making Time to Spare, Job Gosschalk worked as a producer for Kemna, the most influential audition agency in the Netherlands, and was involved in many Dutch feature films. Later, he became the owner of Kemna, but he was most attracted to the artistic aspect of filmmaking, so he began to produce films and television series. He had a lot of success with the film Alles is Liefde and the television series 't Schaep met de 5 pooten. He then switched to directing and made the television series S1NGLE and the play Verre vrienden. His film directing debut came with Alle tijd, for which he also wrote the screenplay. For Alle tijd he had a budget of €1.8 million.

== Music ==
While Job Gosschalk was making Time to Spare, he saw a few videos of Dutch singer Elske DeWall on YouTube. He was impressed by her talent and when he heard a demo version of her single Chasing The Impossible, he thought that it should be the title song of the film. Lead actor Paul de Leeuw was with him, and so Elske DeWall's song became the title song.

== Awards and nominations ==
At the 2011 Netherlands Film Festival, Lineke Rijxman was nominated for a Golden Calf in the category Best Supporting Actress. At the 2012 Lesbisch Schwule Filmtage Hamburg (Hamburg International Queer Film Festival), the film won the "GLOBOLA" award for best feature film.
