= Derek de Lint =

Dutch actor (born 1950)

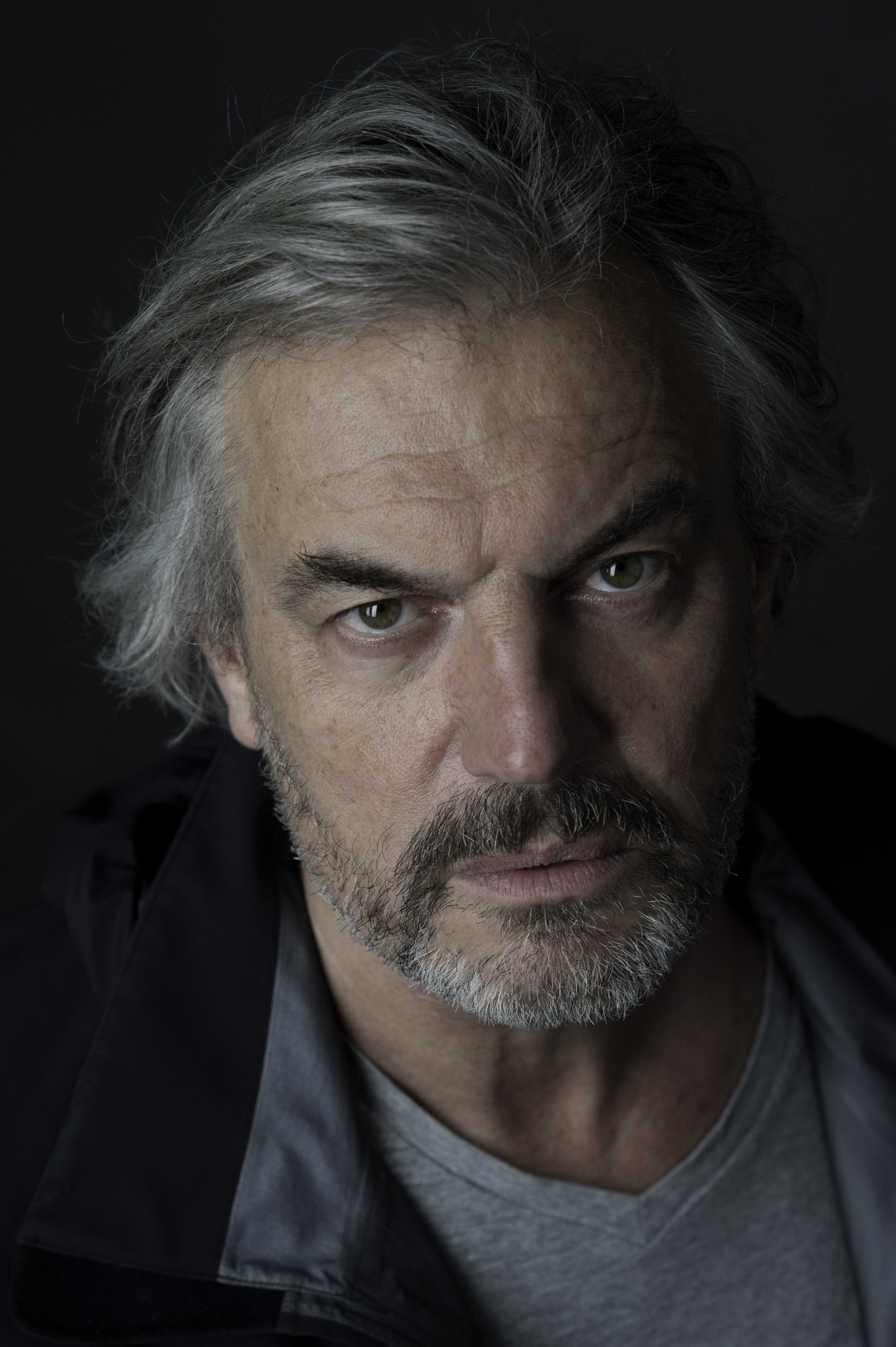
- Born: 17 July 1950 (age 76); The Hague, Netherlands
- Occupation: Actor
- Years active: 1976–present
- Spouse: Dorith Jessurun (m. 1979)

Dick Hein "Derek" de Lint (Dutch pronunciation: [dɪk ˈɦɛin ˈdɛrəɡ də ˈlɪnt]; born 17 July 1950) is a Dutch film and television actor, known for playing the role of Derek Rayne in Poltergeist: The Legacy.

== Life and career ==
Dick Hein de Lint was born on 17 July 1950 in The Hague in the Netherlands. From 1970 to 1972, he studied photography and graphic design at the Kunstacademie in Enschede, followed by two years of Kleinkunstacademie in Amsterdam: "Each morning we began with ballet. From nine o'clock to ten - classic, then an hour of jazz-ballet and sometimes Spanish dance as well. You ought to be ready by nine o'clock in your leotard and bandage or else director Johan Verdoner kick you out of the academy."

In 1975 Derek de Lint made his theatre debut as Rik Vandaele with Thuis from Belgian Hugo Claus: "Really I will make something with cabaret. I had cabaret- programma together with a boy and a girl. Only this was rejected and I was empty-handed. My teacher of Spanish dance, Marino Westra, met by chance at that time with Hugo Claus and Sylvia Kristel [Hugo's wife]. And Hugo said that he wanted an actor for his piece Thuis. At the time Hugo and Sylvia knew that I made money on the side as a photomodel for the Lana magazine. And I was allowed to do a screen test. It happened in Carré [the most important theatre in Amsterdam], in a decor of Cyrano de Bergerac. I read a few stories at an empty hall will seat two thousand. In the first row Hugo sat with whiskey in his hand, near him is Guus Oster, who is going to produce Thuis. Afterward Oster said: 'At least you can say in the future that your career began in Carré'. And I received the role of Rik."

In the following season Derek de Lint played Brad Majors in the production of The Rocky Horror Show directed by O'Brien: "I have received such good criticism, Paul Verhoeven and Ineke van Weezel, who had seen Thuis as well, set eyes on me. And Rob Houwer with Ineke van Weezel were at this show to see if I was suitable for the leading role in Soldier of the Orange. At first talk Ineke said: 'Oh, Derek, it's a film for five million' [guldens, about $2.5 million. It was the most expensive Dutch film]. I was thunderstruck and lost my head. The screen test was a failure. I was still so uncertain. Then I received the role of Alex."

After Soldier of Orange Derek de Lint has played in some movies and TV series, including the leading role in Kort Amerikaans, where he was a cynical young boy, whose sexually explosive character can not satisfy any women. Then De Lint had a second meeting with Paul Verhoeven: "A story with Spetters characterized in fact Paul's position to actors. He had asked me if I would do a screen test for Spetters. I received a script with a lot of trouble. After the second test Paul said that I will star as Rien. A few days later I received a note from Hans Kemna, Paul's assistant, that publicity of Kort Amerikaans cuts across their film and they refuse further cooperation. Have they meant the publicity for Kort Amerikaans at TV - Privé?I'm not responsible for that. Afterward they said that I was older than this character and cut across the cast, only I do not seen such note."

At last Derek de Lint was presented success with two of the best Dutch films to emerge during the 1980s: Rudolph van den Berg's Bastille (1984) and Fons Rademakers' The Assault (1986). In Bastille, which was based on a popular European novel by Leon de Winter, he was brilliant as Paul de Wit, a 37-year-old Jewish Amsterdam history teacher who is haunted by memories of the family he lost in the Holocaust. The Assault told the story of physician Anton Steenwijk whose family was killed by the Nazis during WWII. The film had received the Academy Award, the Golden Globe and prizes at the international festival in Seattle. The Dutch magazine Viva awarded Derek de Lint with the 'Vergulde Klaver' prize as the best actor.

From 1987 to 1989, Derek de Lint has appeared in twelve American and European films and TV series, including Mascara (1987) with Charlotte Rampling and Philip Kaufman's The Unbearable Lightness of Being (1988) with Daniel Day-Lewis, Juliette Binoche, and Lena Olin. He starred as the French philosopher Peter Abelard in Clive Donner's Stealing Heaven (1988), the love story of Abelard and Hélôise. On television Derek de Lint provided a love interest for Dana Delany on ABC's China Beach as Dr. Bernard. Also he has starred as Russian KGB officer Abramov in The Endless Game (1989), a spy thriller, which was directed by Bryan Forbes from his best-selling novel; and Bertrand de Roujay in a six-part drama, The Free Frenchman (1989), a story about a French aristocrat who played a part in the Resistance struggle to free France from the Nazis.

In 1991, De Lint was cast as the lead in Highlander: The Series as Conner Macleod (before the character's name was changed to Duncan). But for unknown reasons, he pulled out of the project.

De Lint later gained recognition for his role as Derek Rayne in Poltergeist: The Legacy, which ran for four seasons.

== Filmography ==
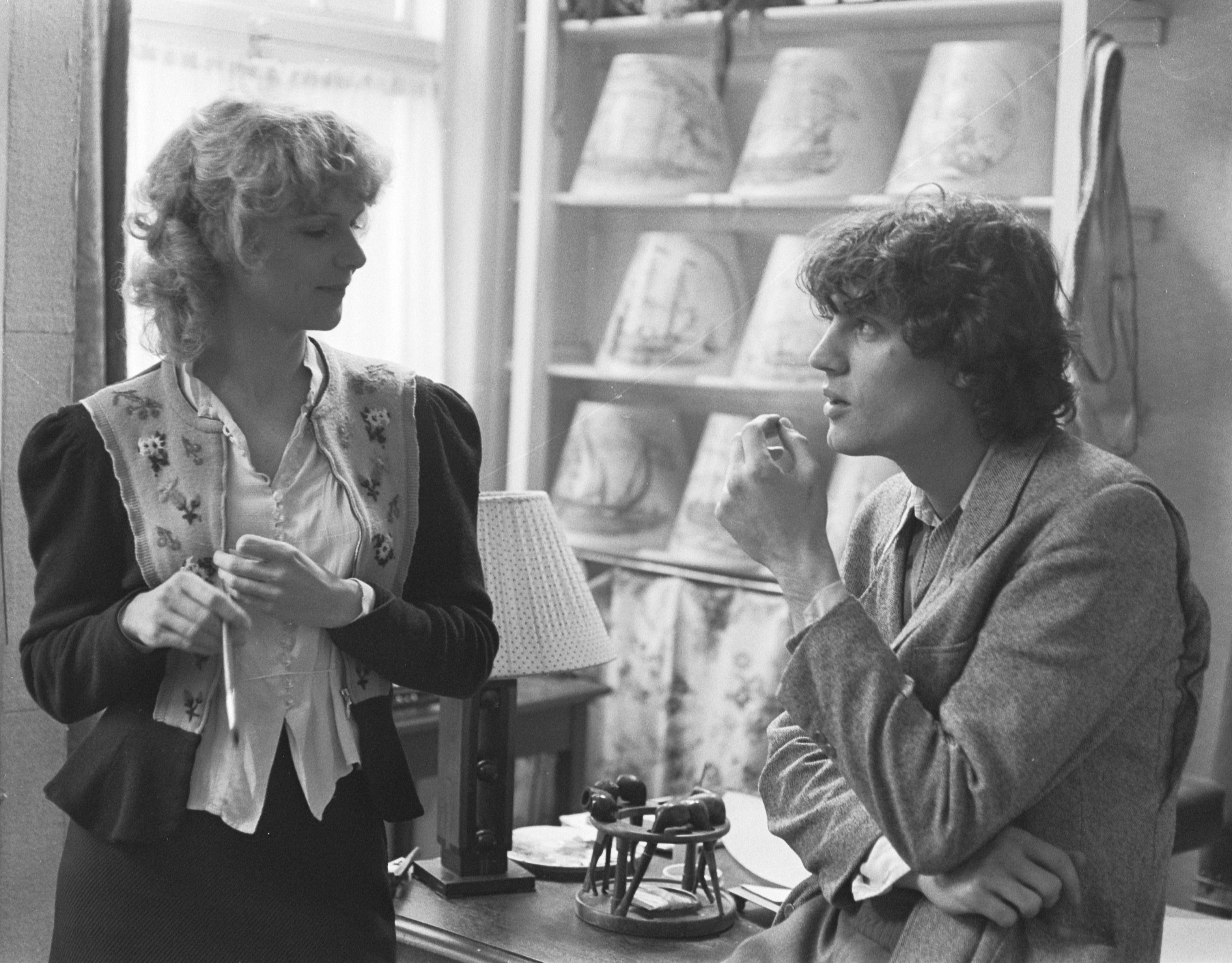
De Lint in Kort Amerikaans (1979)

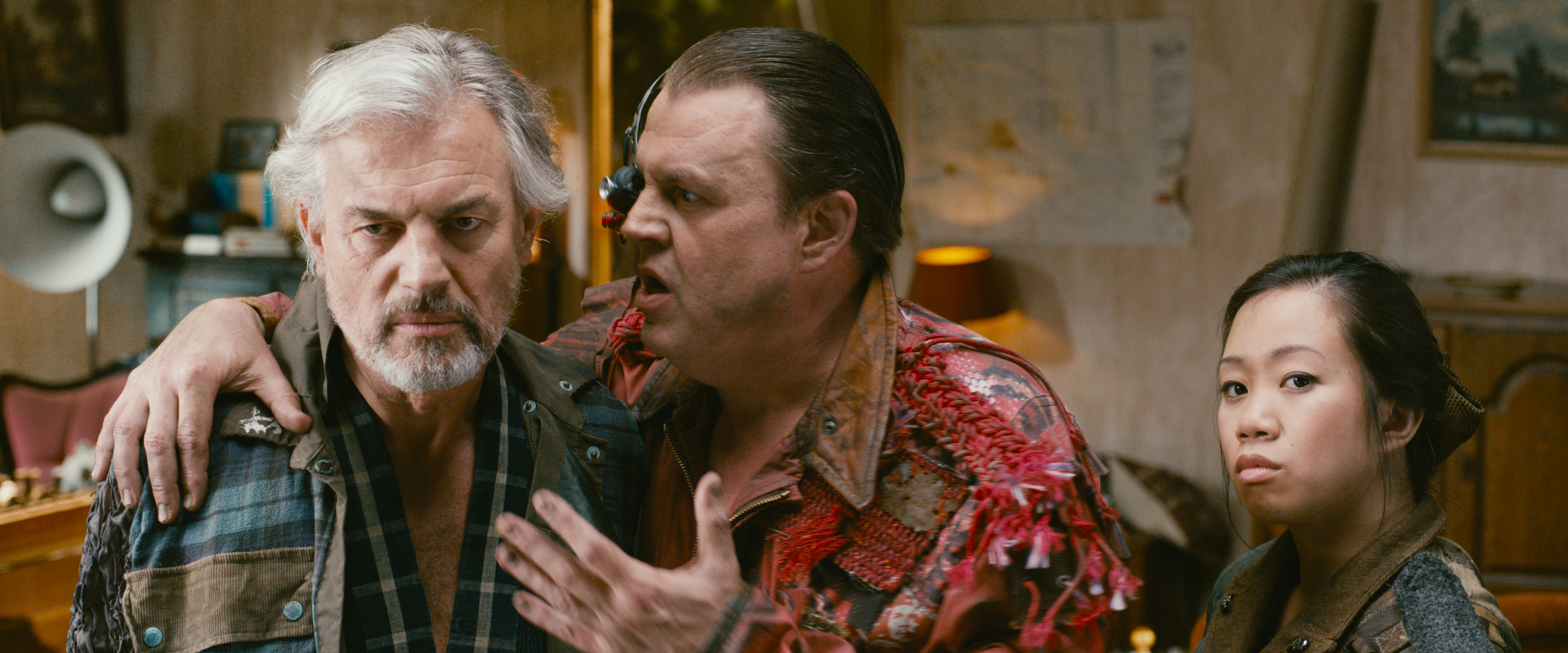
De Lint in Tears of Steel (2012)

- Barocco (1976) as Propagandeman 1
- Blind Spot (1977) as Mark
- Soldier of Orange (1977) as Alex
- Inheritance (1978) as Theo van Delft
- Kort Amerikaans (1979) as Erik
- De Grens (1979, Short)
- Dat moet toch kunnen (1979)
- The Lucky Star (1980) as Lieutenant Steiner
- Come-Back (1981) as Vriend Marij
- Hedwig: The Quiet Lakes (1982) as Ritsaart
- Een Zaak van leven of dood (1983) as Jack de Graaf
- Bastille (1984) as Paul de Wit / Nathan Blum
- Mata Hari (1985) as Handsome Traveller
- The Assault (1986) as Anton Steenwijk
- Dossier Verhulst (1986) as Eric Hoogland
- Chris Brine (1987) as Chris Brine
- Diary of a Mad Old Man (1987) as Philippe / Marcel's son-Simone's husband
- Three Men and a Baby (1987) as Jan Clopatz
- The Unbearable Lightness of Being (1988) as Franz
- Stealing Heaven (1988) as Abelard
- The Great Escape II: The Untold Story (1988, TV Movie) as Dr. Thost
- Rituals (1989) as Inni Wintrop
- The Free Frenchman (1989, TV Mini-Series) as Bertrand de Roujay
- Mountain of Diamonds (1991), mint Lothar de la Rey
- Die Sonne über dem Dschungel (1992)
- Angie (1993) as Peter Koudbier
- Venti dal Sud (1994) as Peter
- Affair play (1995) as Alex Witsen
- Long Live the Queen (Lang leve de koningin) (1995) as Bob Hooke, Sara's Father
- All Men Are Mortal (1995) as Bertus
- The Man Who Made Husbands Jealous (1997, TV Mini-Series) as Roberto Rannaldini
- Deep Impact (1998) as Theo Van Sertema
- The Artist's Circle (2000, Short)
- Soul Assassin (2001) as Karl Jorgensen
- Superstition (2001) as Allessandro Censi
- Tom & Thomas (2002) as Mr. Bancroft
- The Big Charade (2003, Short) as Vlad
- Into the West (2005, TV Mini-Series) as Preacher Hobbes
- Gooische Vrouwen (2005-2009, TV Series, Drama serie) as Dokter Rossi
- When a Stranger Calls (2006) as Dr. Mandrakis
- Black Book (2006) as Gerben Kuipers
- De Brief voor de Koning (2008) as Koning Dagonaut
- Moonlight Serenade (2009) as Terence Hill
- Gooische Vrouwen (2011) as Dokter Rossi
- Nova Zembla (2011) as Willem Barentsz
- Painless (2012, also known as Insensibles) as Dr. Holzmann
- Tears of Steel (2012, Short) as Old Thom
- Valentino (2013) as Karel
- Daylight (2013) as Twan Benschop
- Tula: The Revolt (2013) as Baron van Westerholt
- Midden in De Winternacht (2013) as Santa Claus
- Gooische Vrouwen 2 (2014) as Dokter Rossi
- Michiel de Ruyter (2015) as Kievit
- Code M (2015) as Opa Ber
- Familieweekend (2016) as Pieter
- The White King (2016) as Silver Hair
- Redbad (2018) as Eibert
- The Ice Cream Man (2024, Short) as Father Jan
