= Mi Vida (film) =

2019 Dutch film directed by Norbert ter Hall

- Film poster
- Directed by: Norbert ter Hall
- Starring: Loes Luca; Elvira Mínguez
- Release date: 21 November 2019 (Netherlands)
- Running time: 88 minutes
- Country: Netherlands
- Language: Dutch

Mi Vida is a 2019 Dutch film directed by Norbert ter Hall. The film won the Golden Film award after having sold 100,000 tickets.

Alette Kraan won the Golden Calf award for Best Costume Design. The film also won the Gold Remi award at the WorldFest-Houston International Film Festival.
