= Oscar van den Boogaard =

Dutch writer

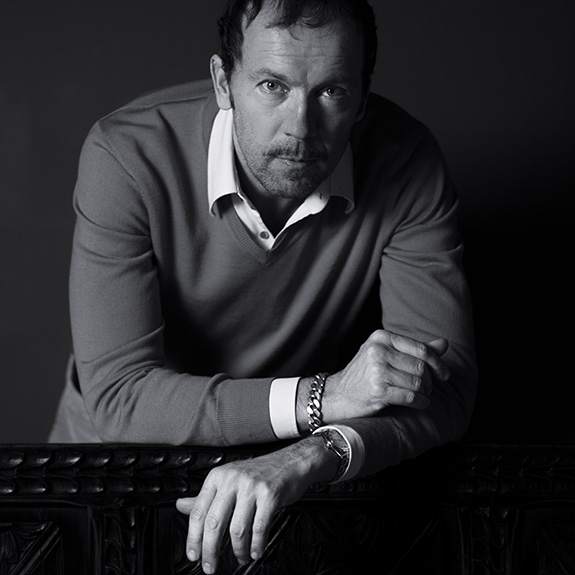
Oscar van den Boogaard

Oscar van den Boogaard (born 1964) is a Dutch writer. Born in Harderwijk, Netherlands, he grew up in Suriname and the Netherlands. He studied law and literature in Montpellier, Amsterdam and Brussels. His debut novel Dentz appeared in 1990. Other books include De heerlijkheid van Julia (Julia's Glory, 1997), which won the Dutch Libris-Literatuurprijs and the Belgian De gouden Uil. The novel "Liefdesdood" (Love's Death, 2001) also received the De gouden Uil prize. It has been translated into English by Ina Rilke.

Boogaard is also the founder of the Mot & van den Boogaard gallery for contemporary art in Brussels. In early 2018, van den Boogaard claimed to be an illegitimate son of Prince Bernhard of the Netherlands, which would make him a half-brother of former Queen Beatrix of the Netherlands.
