= Teun Luijkx =

Dutch actor (born 1986)

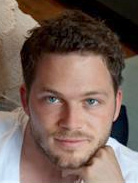
- Luijkx in the film &ME (2013)
- Born: 1986 (age 39–40); Netherlands
- Occupation: Actor
- Years active: 2007–present

Teun Luijkx (born 1986) is a Dutch actor.

Luijkx grew up in Oerle, near Veldhoven. In high school, he showed interest in theater, so he ended up at the Theatre Foundation Plan in Eindhoven, a project where professional theater directors to amateurs have a chance to gain experience. After high school, he went in 2004 to Maastricht Theatre Academy, where he graduated in 2008.

After a small role in the television series Battlestar Galactica in 2008 and a supporting role in the series S1NGLE, he was cast as one of the main characters in A'dam - EVA, a collaboration between the VARA, the NTR and VPRO. In May 2011, he played with Toneelgroep Maastricht together with Reinier Demeijer. This critically acclaimed musical theater production will end August 2011 in reprise during the Cultura Nova festival in Heerlen.

In 2013, he starred in the film &ME.

== Filmography ==
Year	Title	Role	Director	Notes
2008	Voetbalvrouwen	The barman	Hans Scheepmaker	TV series (1 episode)
2008–10	S1NGLE	Vincent	Anne de Clercq & Job Gosschalk	TV series (3 episodes)
2011	Alle tijd	Teun	Job Gosschalk (2)	
2011	De geheimen van Barslet	Kasper de Vries	Boris Paval Conen	TV series (5 episodes)
2011–14	A'dam - E.V.A.	Adam de Heer	Norbert ter Hall	TV series (16 episodes); Nominated - Picture and Sound Award for Best Actor
2012	The Spiral	Max Grunfeld	Hans Herbots	TV series (5 episodes)
2012–14	Bloedverwanten	Boris Lindeman	Anne van der Linden & Pieter van Rijn	TV series (15 episodes)
2013	&ME	Richard Merkelbach	Norbert ter Hall (2)	
2013	Anouk 'Sad Singalongs'		Dana Nechushtan	Short
2015	The Little Gangster	Gymleraar nieuwe school	Arne Toonen & Arent Jack	
2016	Prinses Op De Erwt: een modern sprookje	Kroonprins Manuel van Luxenstein	Will Koopman	TV movie
2017	Fenix	Rens	Shariff Korver	TV mini-series
2018	Retrospekt			
2019	Bloody Marie			
2020	Quo Vadis, Aida?	Captain Mintjes	Jasmila Žbanić	
