= Reinout Scholten van Aschat =

Dutch actor

- Occupation: Actor
- Years active: 2005 – present
- Father: Gijs Scholten van Aschat
- Awards: Golden Calf for Best Actor 2012 The Heineken Kidnapping

Reinout Scholten van Aschat is a Dutch actor.

== Career ==
Between 2005 and 2009, he played the role of Roderick Lodewijkx in the television series Gooische Vrouwen. He also played this character in the 2014 film Gooische Vrouwen 2.

In 2012, he won the Golden Calf for Best Actor award for his role in the film The Heineken Kidnapping. He was also nominated for the Golden Calf for Best Actor award in 2016 for his role in the film Beyond Sleep, a film adaptation of the book Nooit meer slapen by Willem Frederik Hermans.

He also played in episodes of the television series Keyzer & De Boer Advocaten and Flikken Maastricht.

== Personal life ==
He is a son of Gijs Scholten van Aschat and a grandson of Karel Scholten van Aschat.

== Awards ==
- 2012: Golden Calf for Best Actor, The Heineken Kidnapping

== Selected filmography ==
- 2007: Timboektoe
- 2011: The Heineken Kidnapping
- 2014: Gooische Vrouwen 2
- 2015: Cosmos Laundromat
- 2016: Beyond Sleep
- 2018: Capri-Revolution
- 2019: Nocturne
- 2020: De Oost
- 2024: Alpha.
- 2025: Welcome Home Baby
- Upcoming: Pijn
