= Nocturne (2019 film) =

2019 Dutch film

- Film poster
- Directed by: Viktor van der Valk
- Written by: Jeroen Scholten van Aschat; Viktor van der Valk
- Produced by: Erik Glijnis
- Starring: Vincent van der Valk; Reinout Scholten van Aschat; Simone van Bennekom
- Cinematography: Emo Weemhoff
- Edited by: Lot Rossmark
- Music by: Eren Önsoy
- Production company: Maniak Film
- Distributed by: Gusto entertainment
- Release date: 9 May 2019 (Netherlands)
- Running time: 80 minutes
- Countries: Netherlands; Belgium
- Language: Dutch

Nocturne is a 2019 Dutch drama film directed by Viktor van der Valk.

The film screened at the 2019 International Film Festival Rotterdam.

== Cast ==
- Vincent van der Valk as Alex
- Reinout Scholten van Aschat as Ferdinand
- Simone van Bennekom as Anna
- Tom Dewispelaere as Michael
- Bien de Moor as Mother
