= Linda de Mol =

Dutch actress and television presenter (born 1964)

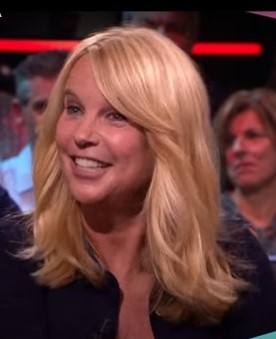
- De Mol in 2018
- Born: Linda Margaretha de Mol; 8 July 1964 (age 62); Hilversum, Netherlands
- Occupations: Actress, television presenter
- Spouse: Fred Reuter (1991–1995)
- Partner(s): Sander Vahle (1995–2007); Jeroen Rietbergen (2007–2022, 2024–present)
- Children: 2
- Relatives: John de Mol Jr. (brother); Johnny de Mol (nephew)
- Awards: Officer of the Order of Orange-Nassau (2011)

Linda Margaretha de Mol (born 8 July 1964) is a Dutch television presenter and actress in the Netherlands and Germany. She is the sister of TV-producer and Endemol co-founder John de Mol, and has frequently appeared in productions of his.

She also runs her own monthly glossy magazine, named by the mononym LINDA.

== Television ==
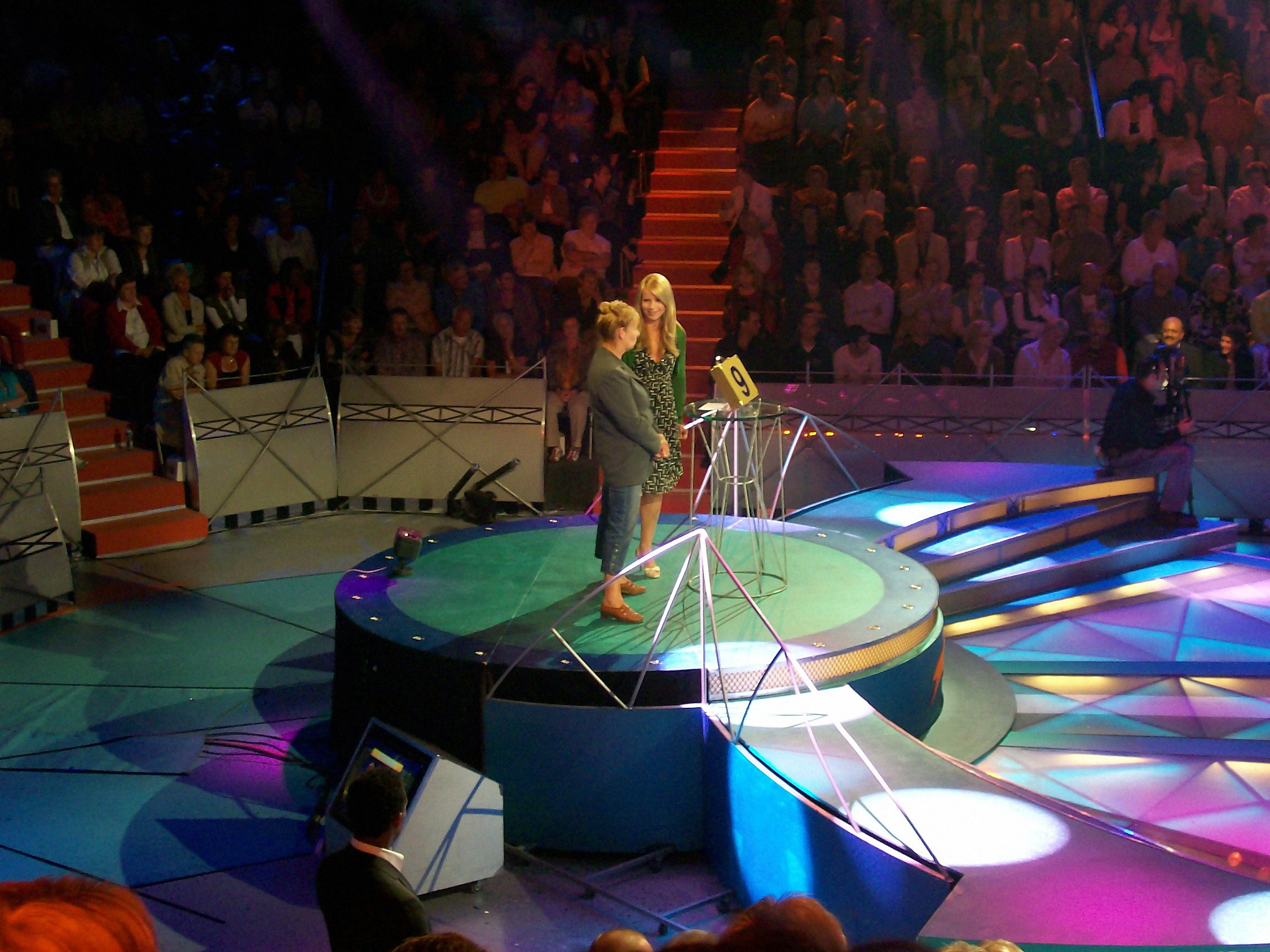
de Mol (centre right) in 2007

Linda de Mol made her television debut at age 12 in Wat je zegt ben je zelf, a programme largely made by children for the Dutch AVRO public (non-profit) broadcasting organization.

In 1984, she resurfaced on Sky Channel, hosting English language music programmes such as Coca-Cola Eurochart Top 50 and In touch with the Dutch (some of Endemol's first productions). From 1986 onwards, De Mol announced cartoons on The DJ Kat Show named after her feline sidekick played by US-exile puppeteer Robbie Hahn. In 1990, some of the scripts for Billy Hot Dog were re-written and shown on TROS' Wednesday evening slot.

De Mol went on to present shows and quizzes, such as Miljoenenjacht (the original version of Deal or No Deal), De Slimste, and M/V. From 2005 until 2009, De Mol starred in the weekly drama series Gooische Vrouwen on RTL 4 (originally on Tien).

De Mol presented the quiz show Briljante Breinen in 2025. The show ended after one season.

== Programs ==
=== Dutch and English ===
- Coca-Cola Eurochart Top 50
- The DJ Kat Show
- In touch with the Dutch
- Linda (talk show)
- Billy Hot Dog
- A to Z
- Dierenbingo (Dutch for "Animal Bingo")
- De leukste thuis
- Love Letters
- Homerun (as of 25 December 1997)
- Spangen (as of 1999)
- Postcodeloterij Miljoenenjacht (Dutch for "Million hunt", the original version of Deal or No Deal)
- Gooische vrouwen (as of 2005) (Dutch for "Women from the Gooi", a rich neighbourhood in the Netherlands)
- Linda en Beau op zondag (Dutch for "Linda and Beau on Sundays")
- De Slimste (Dutch for "The Smartest")
- De Gouden Kooi (as of 2006) (Dutch for "The Golden Cage")
- M/V (as of 16 November 2006, with Beau van Erven Dorens) (Dutch for "Man/Woman")
- Just the Two of Us (as of 11 March 2007, with Gordon)
- Ik hou van Holland (Dutch for "I Love Holland", the original version of I Love My Country)
- Iedereen is gek op Jack (as of February 2011) (Dutch remake of Everybody loves Raymond)
- Familie Kruys (as of April 2015)

=== German ===
- Traumhochzeit (1992–2000, start 19 January 1992, RTL) (2008, ZDF)
- Kollegen, Kollegen (1992, start: 15 September 1992)
- Surprise Show (1994, start 30 October 1994, with Kai Pflaume)
- Hausfieber (1998–1999, start 3 January 1998)
- Kinder für Kinder (UNESCO, 25 December 1993 + 13 November 1994)
- Die Prominenten Playback Show (16 September 1995 en 7 December 1996)
- Soundmix-Show (30 December 1995 – 31 March 1996 and 4 January 1997 – 1 February 1997)
- Domino Day (1998–2002)
- Einer gegen 100 (2002, start: 12 January 2002)
- Der MillionenDeal (2004, SAT.1, start: 1 May 2004)
- Mr. Nanny (Ein Mann für Mama) (Film 2006)
- The Winner Is (2012, SAT.1)

== Filmography ==
- Alice in Glamourland (2004)
- The Dark House (2009)
- Gooische Vrouwen (2011) (Dutch for: 'Women from the Gooi')
- Gooische Vrouwen 2 (2014)

== Music ==
In 1991 De Mol released a Dutch-language album written by Henk Westbroek of the former band Het Goede Doel. Six years later Dino released De Mol's holiday CD single "Perfect Harmony", a duet with The Bold and the Beautiful star Jeff Trachta and featuring backing vocals by American singer Wendy Alane Wright.

== Personal life ==
De Mol married her childhood sweetheart, jeweler Fred Reuter, on 23 August 1991. In September 1995 they divorced. Soon after, De Mol started dating director Sander Vahle. They moved in together a year later. The pair have two children, son Julian (born 1997) and daughter Noa (born 1999). On 31 October 2007 it was announced that De Mol and Vahle had officially separated. Since then De Mol has been in a relationship with composer and keyboardist Jeroen Rietbergen. On January 16, 2022, de Mol made a statement announcing the end of their relationship due to Rietbergen's confession of sexual misbehaviour at The Voice of Holland.
