= Karina Smulders =

Dutch actress (born 1980)

- Born: 4 June 1980 (age 45); Utrecht, Utrecht, Netherlands
- Occupation: Actress
- Years active: 1996-

Karina Smulders is a Dutch stage, television and film actress. She is married to actor Fedja van Huêt.

== Selected filmography ==
- Wild Romance (2006)
- Bride Flight (2008)
- Alle tijd (2011)
- Speak No Evil (2022)

== Bibliography ==
- Ian Haydn Smith. TCM International Film Guide 2008: The Definitive Annual Review of World Cinema. Wallflower Press, 2008.
