= Waldemar Torenstra =

Dutch actor (born 1974)

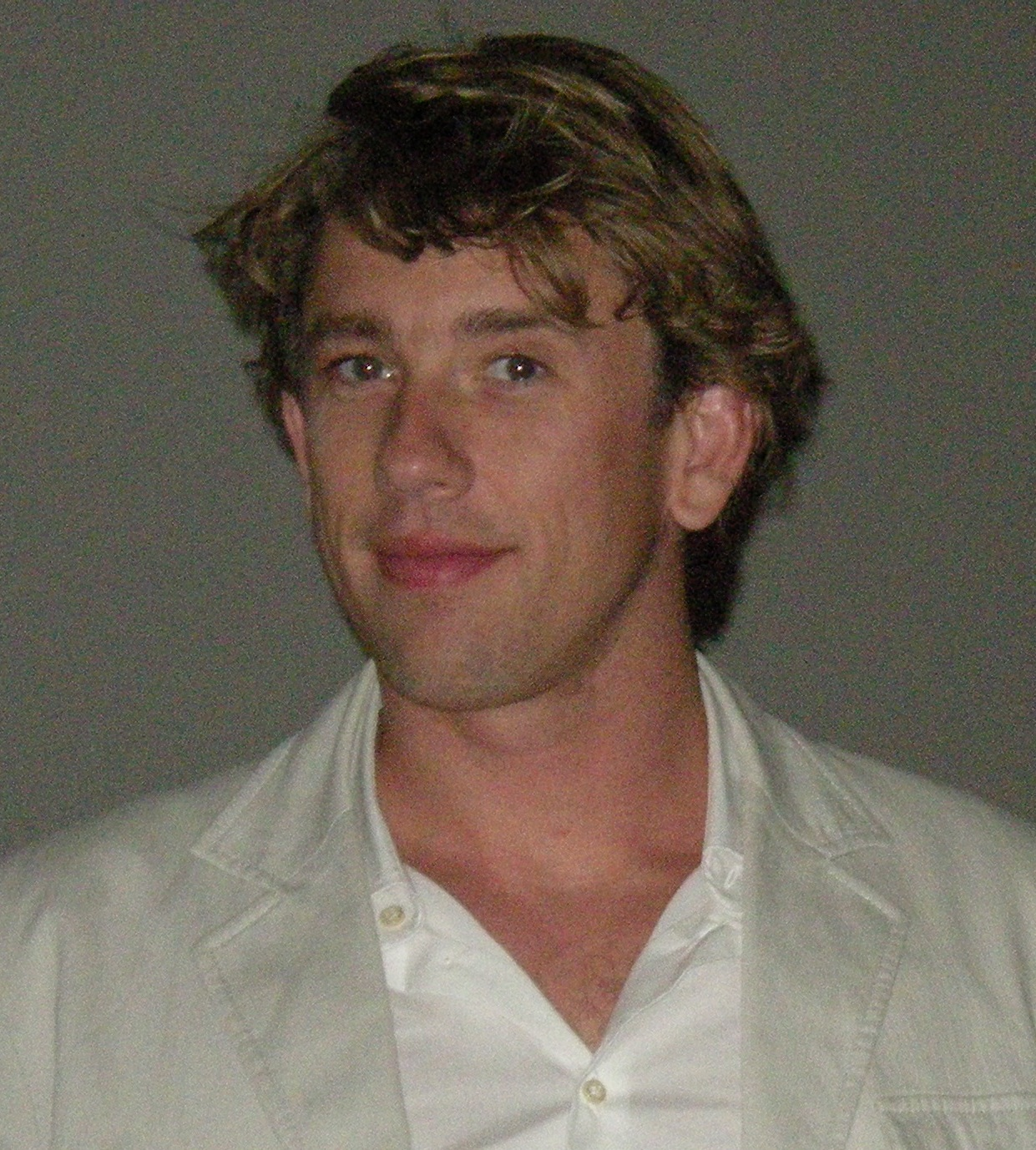
- Born: Waldemar Govinda Torenstra; 29 March 1974 (age 52); Amsterdam, Netherlands
- Occupation: Actor
- Years active: 1987 – present

Waldemar Govinda Torenstra (born 29 March 1974 in Amsterdam) is a Dutch actor. For several years he worked as an actor in the Noord Nederlands Toneel (NNT, En: "North Netherlands Stage"), a touring theater company.

== Career ==
After finishing his secondary education, Torenstra enrolled at the University of Amsterdam to study economics, but eventually chose theater instead. In 1999, he graduated from the Amsterdam Theater School.

At the Noord Nederlands Toneel Torenstra acted in productions of Sympathy for the Devil (main character), Othello (Cassio), and Lenny Bruce. In the fall of 2006, he played the leading role in a production of Moordspel ("Murder Game").

From 2012 to 2014, he served as the head of the jury for ShortCutz Amsterdam, an annual film festival promoting short films in Amsterdam.

In 2015, Torenstra played the role of Nick Roest in Vechtershart (Fighting Spirit), a series about a former kickboxing champion making his way back to the top after a prison sentence abroad. A second season was aired in 2017.

== Personal life ==
Torenstra got engaged to Sophie Hilbrand in December 2018.

== Trivia ==
Torenstra is an avid beekeeper and an activist for the protection of bees.

== Roles and filmography ==
=== TV series ===
- Vechtershart (2015–present)
- Divorce (2012) - Joris
- Lijn 32 (2012) - Hein van Vlijmen
- Mixed Up (Verandering, 2011) - David Vogel
- Grijpstra & De Gier (2007) - Rinus de Gier
- Lieve Lust (2005) - Andy
- De Band (2005) - Sven ten Bokel
- Onderweg naar Morgen (1999) - Charles van Zuydwerk Beemster
- Goede tijden, slechte tijden (1997) - Harry

=== Films ===
- My Granpa, the Bankrobber (Mijn opa de bankrover, 2011) - Teun
- The Happy Housewife (De gelukkige huisvrouw, 2010) - Harry
- Bride Flight (2008) - Frank
- Summer Heat (Zomerhitte, 2008) - Bob Griffioen
- Julia's Tango (2008) - Jeroen
- Yes Nurse! No Nurse! (Ja Zuster, Nee Zuster, 2002) - Gerrit
- Singel 39 - Max
- Huisvrouwen bestaan niet - Thijs
- Amsterdam Vice (Baantjer: Het Begin, 2019) - Jurre de Cock
- Zwanger & Co (2022)
- De Vuurlinie (2023) - Marco Kroon
