= Gooische Vrouwen (film) =

2011 film by Will Koopman

Vipers Nest
- DVD cover
- Gooische Vrouwen
- Directed by: Will Koopman
- Written by: Frank Houtappels
- Story by: Linda de Mol
- Based on: Gooische Vrouwen
- Produced by: John de Mol; Alex Doff
- Starring: Linda de Mol; Susan Visser; Tjitske Reidinga; Lies Visschedijk
- Cinematography: Tom Erisman
- Edited by: Joseph Derksen
- Music by: Jeroen Rietbergen
- Distributed by: Independent Films
- Release dates: 10 March 2011 (Netherlands); 25 June 2011 (France)
- Running time: 105 minutes
- Country: Netherlands
- Language: Dutch
- Budget: €2.5 million
- Box office: €41.7 million

Gooische Vrouwen (English title: Vipers Nest) is a 2011 Dutch film. It is based on the television series Gooische Vrouwen. After the creators announced that the fifth season of the series would be the last, they revealed on 7 November 2009 that they were working on a film adaptation. It earned more than 41.7 million Euro in the box office. The sequel Gooische Vrouwen 2 became the best-visited film in the Netherlands in 2014.

== Plot ==
The film follows the four main characters from the TV series. Cheryl catches her husband cheating on her, Anouk half-accidentally commits art fraud, Claire leaves her fiancé at the altar, and Roelien fights with her family because of her pro-environment views. To escape from all this, they decide to attend a self-help seminar in a French castle. When this turns out to not help them at all, they then go shopping in Paris. Meanwhile, their husbands' lives become a mess and they miss their wives so much. After a tearful call from Cheryl's husband, the wives decide it's time to come back home.

== Cast ==
- Linda de Mol as Cheryl Morero
- Susan Visser as Anouk Verschuur
- Tjitske Reidinga as Claire van Kampen
- Lies Visschedijk as Roelien Grootheeze
- Peter Paul Muller as Martin Morero
- Leopold Witte as Evert Lodewijkx
- Daniël Boissevain as Tom Blaauw
- Derek de Lint as Dr. Ed Rossi
- Marcel Musters as Dirk Stubbe
- Alex Klaasen as Yari
- Beppie Melissen as Cor Hogenbirk
- Koen Wauters as Jean-Philippe
- Loes Luca as Barbara
- Maike Meijer as Fay
- Mea de Jong as Merel van Kampen
- Lisa Bouwman as Vlinder Blaauw
- Priscilla Knetemann as Louise Lodewijkx
- Dorus Witte as Annabel Lodewijkx

== Soundtrack ==
The soundtrack album was released by EMI.

No.	Title	Writer(s)	Artist	Length
1.	"Foxy Lady"	Alain Clark	Alain Clark	3:30
2.	"Perfectly Lonely"	John Mayer	John Mayer	4:28
3.	"Need You Now"	Hillary Scott, Charles Kelley, Dave Haywood, Josh Kear	Lady Antebellum	3:53
4.	"If You Don't Know Me by Now"	Kenny Gamble, Leon Huff	Ben Saunders	3:41
5.	"A Night Like This"	Vince DeGiorgio, David Schreurs	Caro Emerald	3:48
6.	"Zij"	Charles Aznavour, Herbert Kretzmer	Martin Morero	2:25
7.	"The Happening"	Eddie Holland, Lamont Dozier, Brian Holland, Frank De Vol	The Supremes	2:46
8.	"Well, Well, Well"	Duffy, Albert Hammond	Duffy	2:44
9.	"What's Going On"	Marvin Gaye, Al Cleveland, Renaldo Benson,	Marvin Gaye	3:52
10.	"(They Long to Be) Close to You"	Burt Bacharach, Hal David	Trijntje Oosterhuis	3:45
11.	"Beggin'"	Bob Gaudio, Peggy Santiglia	Madcon	3:37
12.	"Golden Days"	Terry Britten, Sue Shifrin	Krystl	2:53
13.	"Pack Up"	Tim Woodcock, Eliza Doolittle, Felix Powell, George Asaf, Matt Prime	Eliza Doolittle	3:10
14.	"Hou je van mij"	René Froger	René Froger & Martin Morero	3:53
15.	"You Must Really Love Me"	Pearl Jozefzoon	Pearl Jozefzoon	3:42
16.	"Hold On"	Di-rect	Di-rect	4:12
17.	"Superfly"	Curtis Mayfield	Curtis Mayfield	3:53
18.	"Clap Your Hands"	Sia, Samuel Dixon	Sia	3:58
19.	"Une belle histoire"	Pierre Delanoë	Michel Fugain	3:17
20.	"Valentino"	José María Guzmán	Diane Birch	2:50
21.	"Elephants"	Ruben Hein	Ruben Hein	3:32
22.	"For the First Time"	Danny O'Donoghue, Mark Sheehan	The Script	4:10
Total length:				1:17:59
