= Susan Visser =

Dutch actress (born 1965)

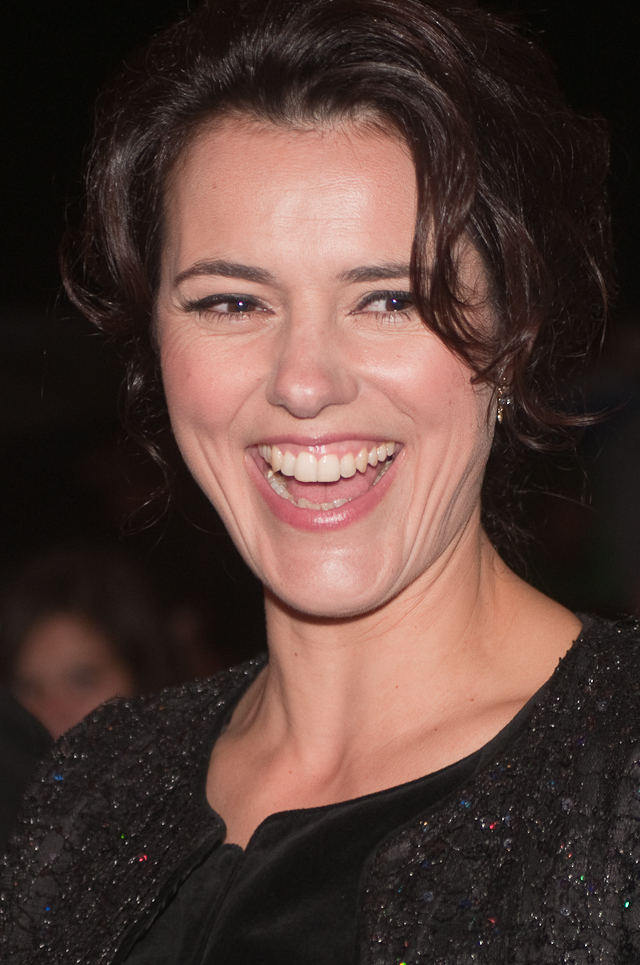
- Born: 15 October 1965 (age 60); Rotterdam, Netherlands
- Occupation: Actress
- Years active: 1990–present

Susan Visser (born 15 October 1965) is a Dutch film actress. She has appeared in more than forty films and television shows since 1990. She is best known for her role as Anouk Verschuur in Gooische Vrouwen.

== Personal life ==
Visser was married to actor Roef Ragas, who died in 2007.

== Filmography ==
=== Film ===
Year	Title	Role	Notes
2019	Cuban Love	Loes	
2015	Sneeuwwitje en de Zeven Kleine Mensen	Alexia	
2014	Gooische Vrouwen 2	Anouk Verschuur	
2014	2/11 Het spel van de wolf	Ellen Maas	
2014	Hartenstraat	Mirjam	
2013	Voorbij (short)	Moeder	
2013	Smoorverliefd	Judith	
2013	Game, But Whose Game Is It?	Annette	
2012	Taped	Saar	
2011	Gooische Vrouwen	Anouk Verschuur	
2010	Heading West	Claire	
2010	Finnemans	Myla	
2009	Lover or Loser	Katja	
2006	Black Book	Drunken Woman in Prison #2	
2006	Het zwijgen	Heleen Kleingeld	
2004	Amazones	Lot	
2003	Polleke	Ina	
2003	Roadkill (short)	Woman	
1999	Man, Vrouw, Hondje	Wife of lorry driver	
1997	Lovely Liza	Nora	
1996	Off Mineur	Henriet	
1996	The Dress	Parkhoertje	
1990	Koeman & Co	Maaike	

TV
Year	Title	Role	Notes
2005-2009	Gooische Vrouwen	Anouk Verschuur	
1990-1992 / 1994	In de Vlaamsche pot	Dirkje van Damme	
