= Gijs Scholten van Aschat =

Dutch actor (born 1959)

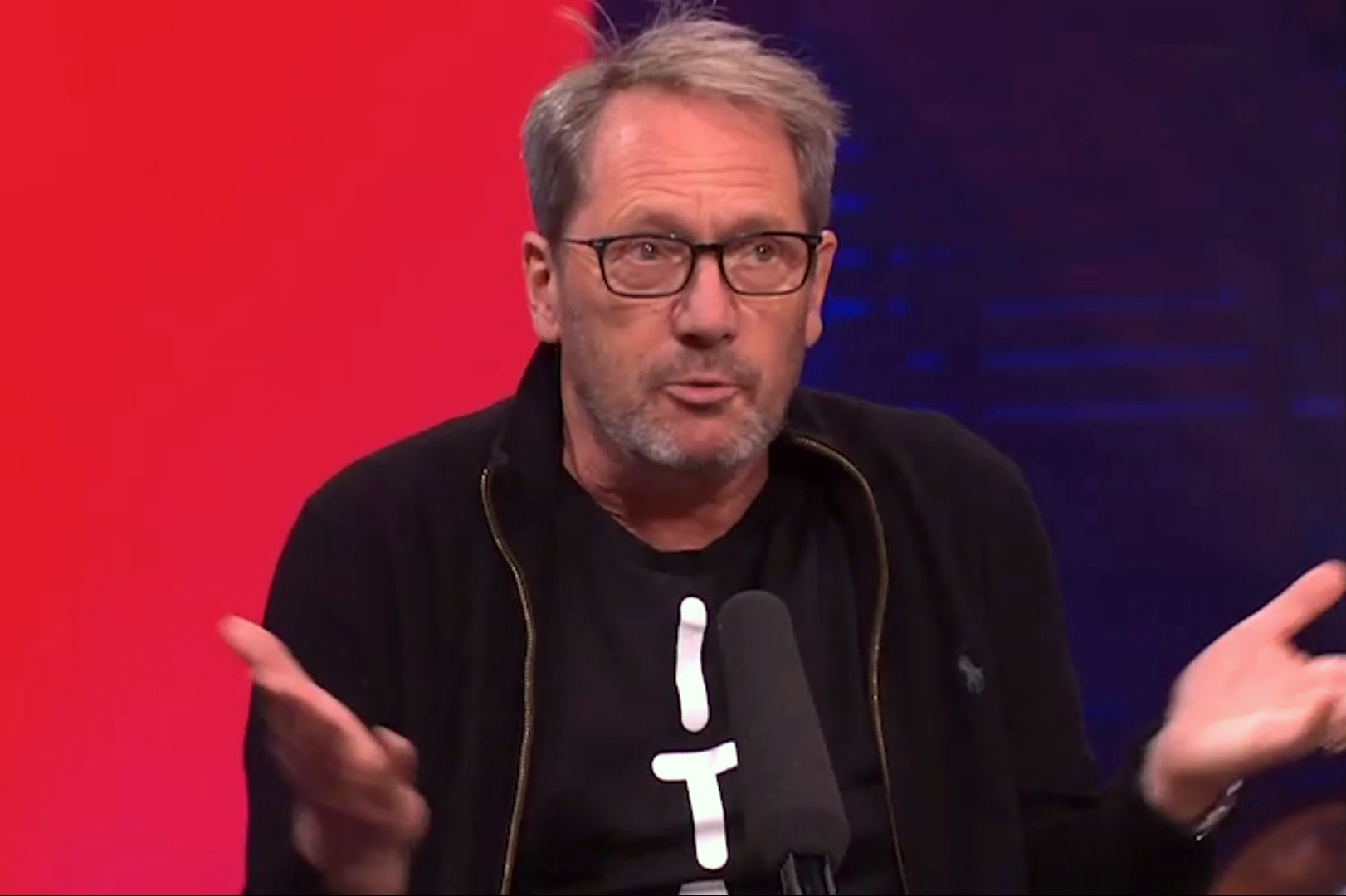
- Born: 16 September 1959 (age 65); Doorn, Netherlands
- Occupation: Actor
- Years active: 1980–present

Scholten van Aschat (2012)

Gijs Scholten van Aschat (born 16 September 1959) is a Dutch actor. He has appeared in more than sixty films since 1980.

He is the father of Reinout Scholten van Aschat.

== Selected filmography ==
Film
Year	Title	Role	Notes
2024	Alpha.	Gijs	
2016	Public Works	Walter Vedder	
2012	Manslaughter	Felix	
2010	Tirza	Jörgen	
2008	The Letter for the King	Knight Edwinem	
2008	Tiramisu	Lex	
2006	Keep Off	father of Melissa	
2003	Cloaca	Joep	
2000	The Black Meteor	Schouten, Heracles chairman	
2000	Leak	Ferdinand de Wit	
1997	The Gambler	Maikov	
1993	The Betrayed	Henk Grond	
1992	The Three Best Things in Life	Thomas	
1991	The Province	Koos	

TV
Year	Title	Role	Notes
2006–2008	Gooische Vrouwen	Ernst Scheepmaker van Altena	

Theatre
Year	Title	Role	Notes
2017	Obsession	Joseph	Toneelgroep Amsterdam
2016	The things that pass	Emile Takma	Toneelgroep Amsterdam
2016	Husbands and wives	Jack	Toneelgroep Amsterdam
2016	The year of cancer	He	Toneelgroep Amsterdam
2015	The hidden force	Otto van Oudijck	Toneelgroep Amsterdam
2014	Queen Lear	Robert (Big Bob) Kent	Toneelgroep Amsterdam
2013	Danton's Death	Robespierre	Toneelgroep Amsterdam
2013–2015	The entertainer	Archie Rice	Toneelgroep Amsterdam
2013	Long day's journey into night	James Tyrone	Toneelgroep Amsterdam
2012	Cat on a Hot Tin Roof	Big Daddy Pollitt	Toneelgroep Amsterdam
2012	Opening Night	David	Toneelgroep Amsterdam
2012–2017	Roman Tragedies	Coriolanus, Agrippa	Toneelgroep Amsterdam
2012–2013	After the rehearsal / persona	Hendrik Vogler and Elisabeth's husband	Toneelgroep Amsterdam
2010–2014	The Russians!	count Sjabelski	Toneelgroep Amsterdam
2011	Disgrace	David Lurie	Toneelgroep Amsterdam
2011	And we'll never be parted	He	Toneelgroep Amsterdam
2010	Richard III	Richard	Het Zuidelijk Toneel
2010–2013	Children of the Sun	Boris Tjepoernoi	Toneelgroep Amsterdam
2009	Goodbye monologues	Guest reader	Bos Theaterproducties/Landelijk Steunpunt
2008	Departure	Theatrical reader	Het Zuidelijk Toneel
2008	Les Liaisons Dangereuses	No name	-
2008	Duende	No name	-
2007	The history of the Avenier family	Bartender Christ	Het Toneel Speelt
2005	Tirannie of the time	No name	ZT Hollandia
2005	The Shortest Century	Orkater	
2004	The Method Ribadier	No name	Nationale Toneel
2004	Demonen	No name	Het Toneel Speelt
2004	Dodelijke Affaires	De man	Orkater & Nederlands Philharmonisch Orkest
2004	Over de Duivel en de Dood	No name	Orkater & Het Mondriaan Kwartet
2004	Huis & Tuin	No name	Nationale Toneel
2003	Hagedissehuid	No name	Orkater
2002	Cloaca	No name	Het Toneel Speelt
2002	The Prefab Four	No name	Orkater
2000	Familie	No name	Het Toneel Speelt
1999	Iwanov	No name	Art & Pro
1999	Black Box	No name	-
1999	Hamlet	Hamlet	Nationale Toneel
1998	Een Formidabele Yankee	No name	Orkater
1997	De New Yorkers	No name	-
1996	Hoti	No name	-
1996	Design for Living	No name	-
1995	Wie vermoordde Mary Rogers	Edgar Allan Poe	Orkater
1994/1995	Timon van Athene	dichter	Toneelgroep Amsterdam
1994	Oom Wanja	Astrov	-
1993	Decadence	No name	Nationale Toneel
1990	Richard II	No name	Vrije Theaterproductie
1990	Voldoende Koolhydraat	No name	Nationale Toneel
1989	Alkestis	No name	Nationale Toneel
1986	Lysander	No name	Haagse Comedie
1984	Romeo en Julia	Romeo	Haagse Comedie
