= Loes Luca =

Dutch actress, singer and comedian (born 1953)

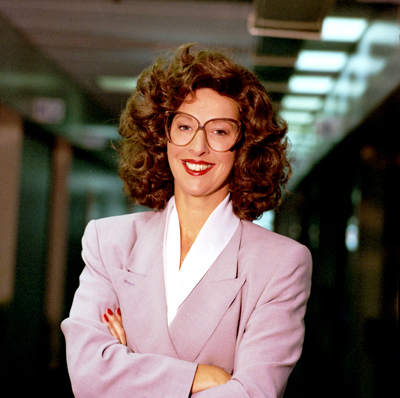
- Loes Luca portraying the character of Yvette de Vriesch (1992)
- Born: 18 October 1953 (age 72); Rotterdam, Netherlands
- Occupations: Actor, singer and comedian
- Years active: 1980–present
- Children: Nina Gantz
- Website: loesluca.nl

Louise "Loes" Diana Wilhelmina Catharina Luca (born 18 October 1953) is a Dutch actress, singer and comedian. She began her career in the 1980s as a stage actress and singer in various musicals. She later started a successful film and television career, starring in Spetters, Het meisje met het rode haar, De Noorderlingen and Ja zuster, nee zuster. She also appeared in the television show 't Schaep met de 5 Pooten.

== Personal life ==
Luca was born in Rotterdam. When she was seventeen she wanted to go to the Academie voor Expressie. Because she didn't speak French at the time and had only three years Mulo, after which she departed for France to become an au pair. Five years later she was admitted and she is now an official drama teacher.

Luca married in the 1980s and had one daughter (BAFTA and Sundance winning animation film director Nina Gantz) but divorced in 1992 after her husband had cheated on her. Until his death in 2008 she was in a relationship with Harald van der Lubbe (brother to De Dijk's Huub van der Lubbe).

In an interview with the Dutch Psychology Magazine, Luca disclosed that her father engaged in sexual activities with younger men during her youth. She added that this had strained her relationship with her father.

== Theatre ==
In the onewomanshow Moordwijven, Loes Luca depicts the racy story of five women fighting life's challenges in just a few scenes. Luca was nominated for the Theo d'Or, a theatre prize awarded annually to the best actress in a leading role. In March 2007 the production Sophie Tucker, The Last of the Red Hot Mama's premiered.

Year	Title	Role	Director	Production company
1981	De wangedachte			De Horde
1982	Ik mag zo graag eenvoudig stil			De Horde
2006	Loes Luca – Moordwijven (Murder bitches)	five women	Aat Ceelen	Kikproductions

== Discography ==
In late 2006, Luca released a CD called Wenend in het portaal (crying in the porch), in which she sings old almost forgotten tear-jerkers.

== Filmography ==
Year	Title	International Title	Role	Notes
1980	Spetters			
1981	Een vlucht regenwulpen	A flight of rainbirds	Driver	
1981	Het meisje met het rode haar	The girl with the red hair	An	
1983	Het veld van eer		Ada	
1984	De schorpioen	The Scorpion	Girl in bar	
1986	Abel	Voyeur	Christine	
1987	Een maand later	A month later	Ingrid	Voice
1989	Theo en Thea		Masochistic housekeeper	
1992	De Noorderlingen	The northerners	Fat Willy's mother	
1994	Wie aus weiter Ferne		Woman farmer / Tea lady	TV movie
1994	Seth & Fiona		Ellen	TV series 1 Episode
1996	De jurk	The dress	Blind woman	
1996	Mijn Franse tante Gazeuse		Midwife Willems	
2001	Minoes	Miss Minoes	Aunt Moortje	Voice
2002	De sluikrups		Roxy	
2002	Ja zuster, nee zuster	Yes Nurse! No Nurse!	Sister Klivia	
2005	Lepel		Koppenol	
2005	Robots		Aunt Fanny	Voice (Dutch version)
2006–2015	't Schaep met de 5 Pooten	Dora	Doortje Lefèvre	TV series 40 Episodes
2012	De Marathon		Hannie	
2019	Baantjer: Het Begin	Amsterdam Vice	Louise	
2019	Mi Vida	My Life	Lou Welter	
2021	Maud & Babs		Babs	TV series 8 Episodes
2022	Knor	Oink	Aunt Christine	Voice
2022	Ik wist het	If Only She Knew	Viola	
