= Hadewych Minis =

Dutch actress & singer (born 1977)

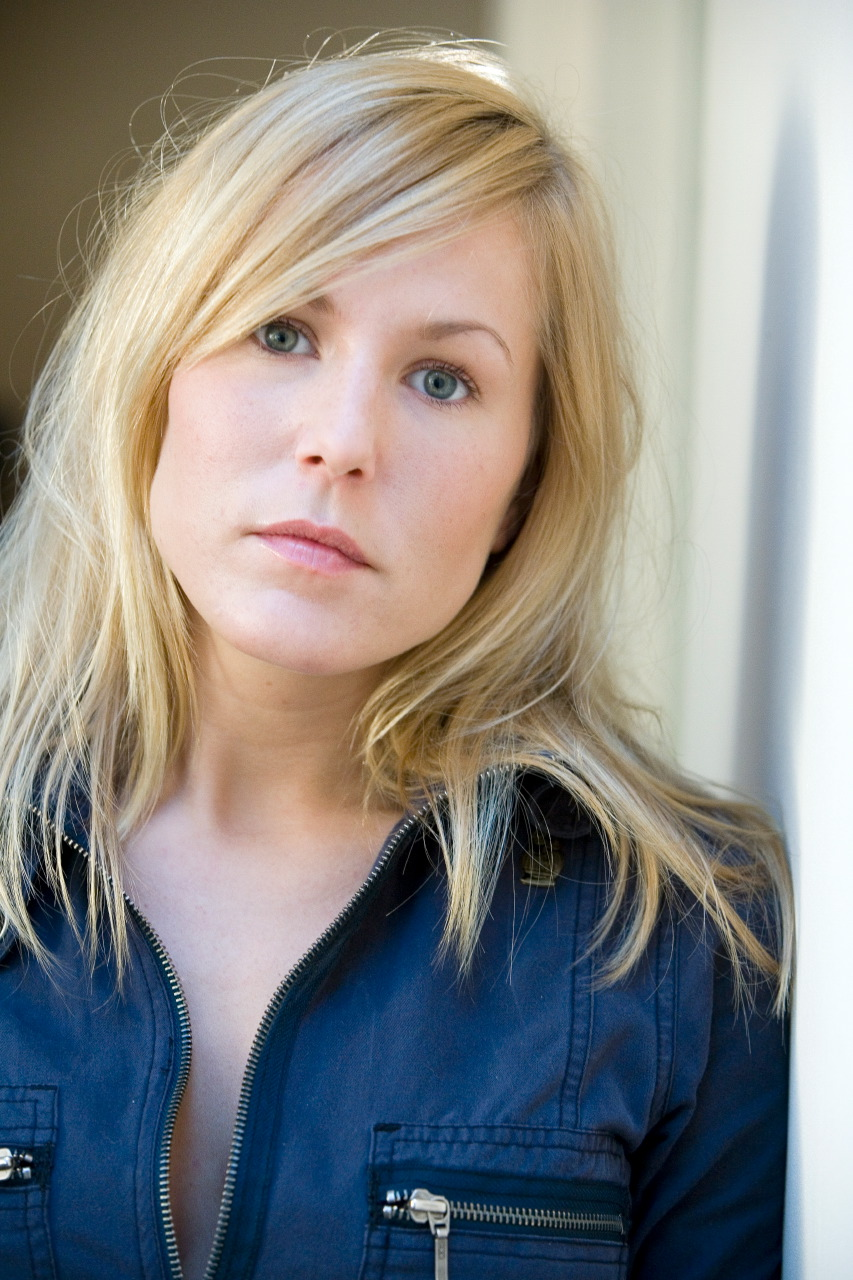
- Minis in 2006
- Born: 5 January 1977 (age 49); Maastricht, Netherlands
- Occupation: Actress
- Years active: 2000–present

Hadewych Minis (born 5 January 1977) is a Dutch actress & singer. She won the 2013 Golden Calf for Best Actress award for her performance as Marina in Borgman and was awarded the prestigious Theo d'Or prize for her solo performance in the Dutch adaptation of Dennis Kelly's play Girls & Boys.

She appeared in an episode of the 2025 anniversary season of the television show Wie is de Mol?. Minis appeared in the 2025 season of the television show The Masked Singer.

== Selected filmography ==
Year	Title	Role	Notes
2003	Phileine Says Sorry		
2007	Moordwijven	Estelle	
2009	My Queen Karo	Rosa	
2010	Loft		
2013	Borgman		
2015	Bloed, zweet & tranen		
2016	The Fury		
2016	Toni Erdmann	Tatjana	
2017	Love Revisited	Maria	
2021	The Spectacular	Jeanine Maes	
2022	Met Mes		
2022	Van der Valk	Marielle Cuyper	
