= Wedding in Cuba =

2019 Dutch film directed by Johan Nijenhuis

Cuban Love
- Theatrical release poster
- Dutch: Verliefd op Cuba
- Directed by: Johan Nijenhuis
- Written by: Anne-Louise Verboon
- Produced by: Robert Labruyère; Ingmar Menning; Koji Nelissen; Johan Nijenhuis
- Starring: Susan Visser; Abbey Hoes; Rolf Sanchez
- Cinematography: Maarten van Keller
- Edited by: Elsbeth Kasteel
- Music by: Martijn Schimmer
- Distributed by: Entertainment One Benelux
- Release date: 14 February 2019
- Running time: 105 minutes
- Country: Netherlands
- Language: Dutch

Wedding in Cuba (Dutch: Verliefd op Cuba) is a 2019 Dutch romantic comedy film directed by Johan Nijenhuis.

The film won the Golden Film award after having sold 100,000 tickets and the film also won the Platinum Film award after having sold 400,000 tickets. It was the sixth film directed by Nijenhuis that won this award. The film became the second best visited Dutch film of 2019.

== Plot ==
Loes (Susan Visser) discovers that her daughter (Abbey Hoes) is getting married in Cuba. Loes books the first flight to Cuba to prevent this.

== Cast ==
- Susan Visser as Loes
- Abbey Hoes as Maartje
- Rolf Sanchez as Carlos
- Jan Kooijman as Jan
- Maaike Martens as Machteld
- Tjebbo Gerritsma as Alex
- Niek Roozen as Hein
- Maarten Dannenberg as Diego
- Mareya Salazar as Benita

== Production ==
Two scenes were not permitted to be filmed in Cuba and these were filmed in Ibiza instead.

== Reception ==
The film received poor reviews by critics. The film was said to contain many clichés and a stereotypical portrayal of Cuba and Cubans.
