= Lies Visschedijk =

Dutch actress (born 1974)

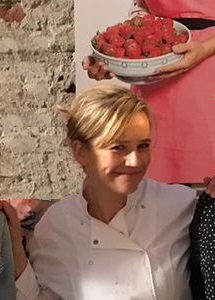
- Lies Visschedijk (2019)
- Born: 14 January 1974 (age 52); Heel, Netherlands
- Occupation: Actress
- Years active: 1997-present

Lies Visschedijk (born 14 January 1974) is a Dutch actress. She appeared in more than thirty films since 1997.

== Selected filmography ==
Year	Title	Role	Notes
2007	Love is All		
2010	Loft		
2011	Gooische Vrouwen	Roelien Grootheeze	
2013	Soof		
2014	Gooische Vrouwen 2	Roelien Grootheeze	
2015	Hallo Bungalow	Olivia	
2016	Soof 2		
2019	Singel 39	Monique	
2022	Soof 3		
