= Johan van Hulst =

Dutch professor, politician, and Righteous Among the Nations (1911-2018)

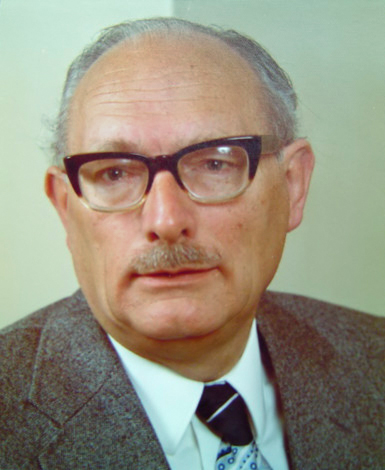
- Van Hulst in 1980

Leader of the Christian Democratic Appeal in the Senate
- In office 8 June 1977 – 10 June 1981
- Preceded by: Office established
- Succeeded by: Jan Christiaanse

Leader of the Christian Historical Union in the Senate
- In office 10 December 1968 – 8 June 1977
- Preceded by: J. C. Bührmann
- Succeeded by: Office abolished

Chair of the Christian Historical Union
- In office 5 October 1968 – 19 February 1972
- Leader: Jur Mellema (1968–1970); Berend Jan Udink (1970–1971); Arnold Tilanus (1971–1972)
- Preceded by: Arnold Tilanus
- Succeeded by: Otto van Verschuer

Senator of the Netherlands
- In office 3 July 1956 – 10 June 1981

Member of the European Parliament
- In office 16 October 1961 – 30 September 1968
- Constituency: Netherlands

Personal details
- Born: Johan Willem van Hulst; 28 January 1911 Amsterdam, Netherlands
- Died: 22 March 2018 (aged 107) Amsterdam, Netherlands
- Party: Christian Democratic Appeal (from 1980)
- Other political affiliations: Christian Historical Union (1945–1980)
- Spouse: Anna Jannetta Donker (m. 1936–1998; her death)
- Children: 4 children
- Education: Vrije Universiteit Amsterdam
- Occupation: Politician, author, teacher, pedagogue, professor

Johan Willem van Hulst (28 January 1911 – 22 March 2018) was a Dutch school director, university professor, author, politician, chess player and centenarian. In 1943, with the help of the Dutch resistance and students of the nearby University of Amsterdam, he was instrumental in saving over 600 Jewish children from the nursery of the Hollandsche Schouwburg who were destined for deportation to Nazi concentration camps. For his humanitarian actions he received the Yad Vashem distinction Righteous Among the Nations from the State of Israel in 1973.

Van Hulst served as Senator of the Netherlands from July 1956 to June 1981. He was elected to be the parliamentary leader of the Christian Historical Union (CHU) in the Senate from December 1968 until June 1977, when the CHU merged into the Christian Democratic Appeal (CDA). He then became the first CDA Leader in the Senate. Van Hulst previously served as the party chair of the CHU from September 1969 until February 1972. He also was a Member of the European Parliament (MEP) for the Christian Democratic Group from October 1961 until September 1968.

He later was an emeritus professor of pedagogy at the Vrije Universiteit Amsterdam and a prolific author with more than a hundred publications. He was also a noted chess player.

== Early life ==
Van Hulst was born on 28 January 1911 in Amsterdam, the son of Gerrit van Hulst and Geertruida Hofman. He studied psychology and pedagogy at the Vrije Universiteit Amsterdam.

In the meantime he worked as a teacher and mentor in Oudewater, Utrecht and Purmerend.

== Rescue of Jewish children ==
In 1942 van Hulst was the director of the Reformed Teacher Training College which educated elementary school teachers at Plantage Middenlaan 27, Amsterdam. Across the street at Plantage Middenlaan 24 was the Hollandse Schouwburg theatre, the main clearing site for the Jews living in Amsterdam who had been issued deportation notices by the Nazi government.

Children who arrived at the Schouwburg were separated from their families and sent to the neighbouring crèche at Plantage Middenlaan 31 run by Henriëtte Pimentel. The crèche shared a back garden with the college that Van Hulst directed.

Starting in January 1943, Pimentel and Walter Süskind, a German Jew who had been appointed by the Nazis to run the Hollandsche Schouwburg operation, began canvassing potential adoptive families for physical descriptions of children who could fit into their families without detection. Once the children's parents had agreed, the names of the children to be rescued were removed from the Nazi's registry of Jews who had passed through the Schouwburg theatre.

Then, working with Pimentel, Süskind and dozens of other volunteers, Van Hulst arranged for the children to be spirited over the hedge separating the neighbouring back yards of the crèche and the teachers' college, often assisted by the teachers-in-training or local university students. When the time came to move the rescued children and babies away from the school, they would be hidden in containers such as bags, sacks or laundry baskets.

Numerous methods were used to move the hidden children from the school. In one method, the operation's helpers would wait for the moment a tram passed, blocking the view of Nazi guards at the facing Hollandsche Schouwburg, to cycle away with the hidden child.

The operation came to a halt on 29 September 1943 when the Nazis sent Pimentel and 100 children from the crèche to Nazi concentration camps. Decades later, Van Hulst described his experience: "Now try to imagine 80, 90, perhaps 70 or 100 children standing there, and you have to decide which children to take with you. [...] That was the most difficult day of my life. [...] You know for a fact that the children you leave behind are going to die. I took 12 with me. Later on I asked myself: ‘Why not 13?'" Van Hulst thought twelve was the right number, otherwise the Germans would notice his plan and shut it down. In total, the operation had rescued between 500 and 1,000 Jewish babies and children.

Van Hulst received the Yad Vashem distinction in 1973. During a visit to the Netherlands in 2012, Israeli Prime Minister Benjamin Netanyahu said of Van Hulst: "We say, those who save one life save a universe. You saved hundreds of universes. I want to thank you in the name of the Jewish people, but also in the name of humanity." Van Hulst replied, talking about the children he could not save: "I only can hope the angels may conduct them into paradise."

In 2016, the former Reformed Teacher Training College became the Dutch National Holocaust Museum.

Shortly before his 107th birthday in 2018, Van Hulst gave an interview on Dutch television, talking about his experiences during the war.

== Political career ==
=== Senate ===
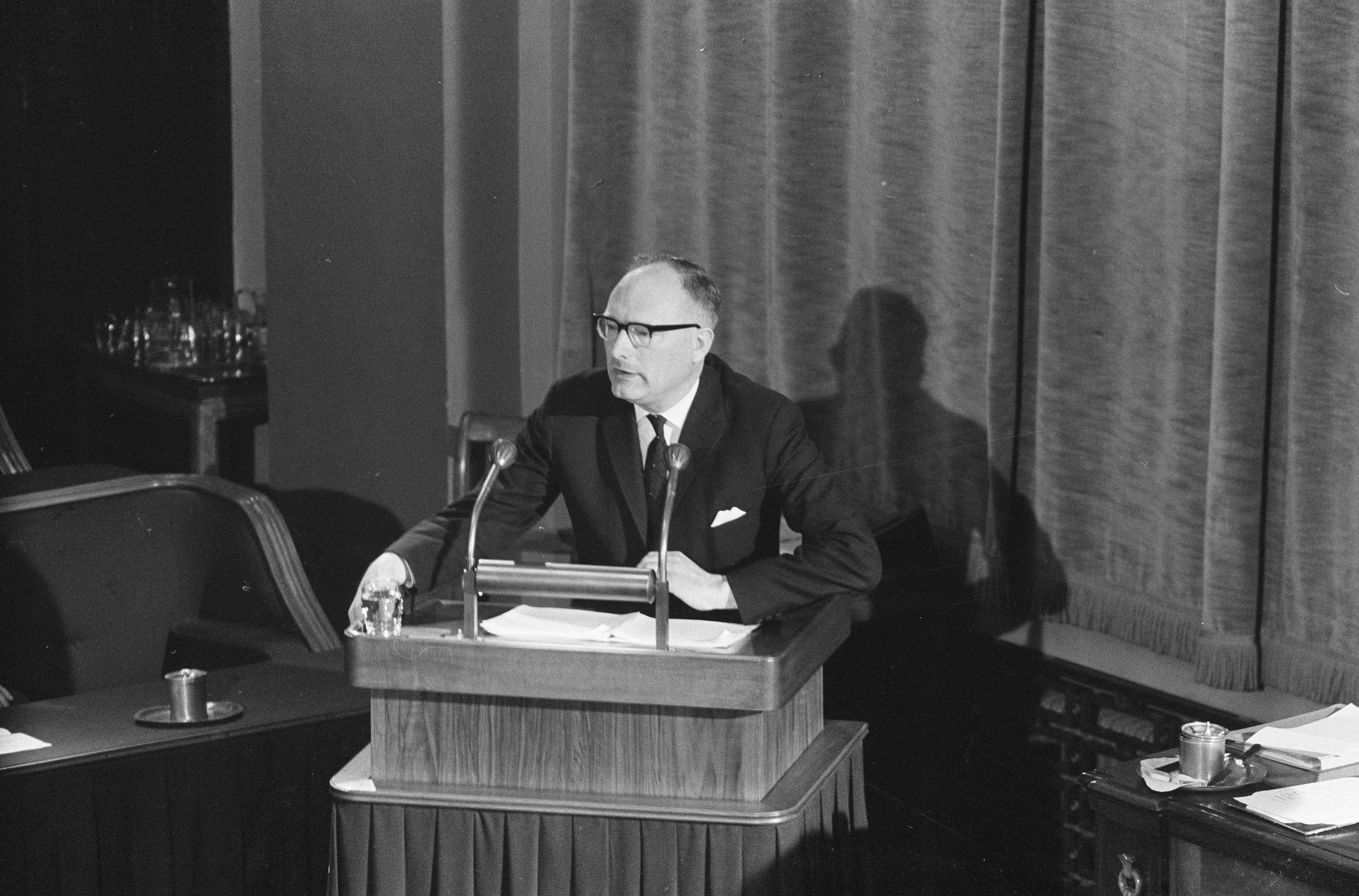
Van Hulst speaking in the Dutch Senate, February 1963

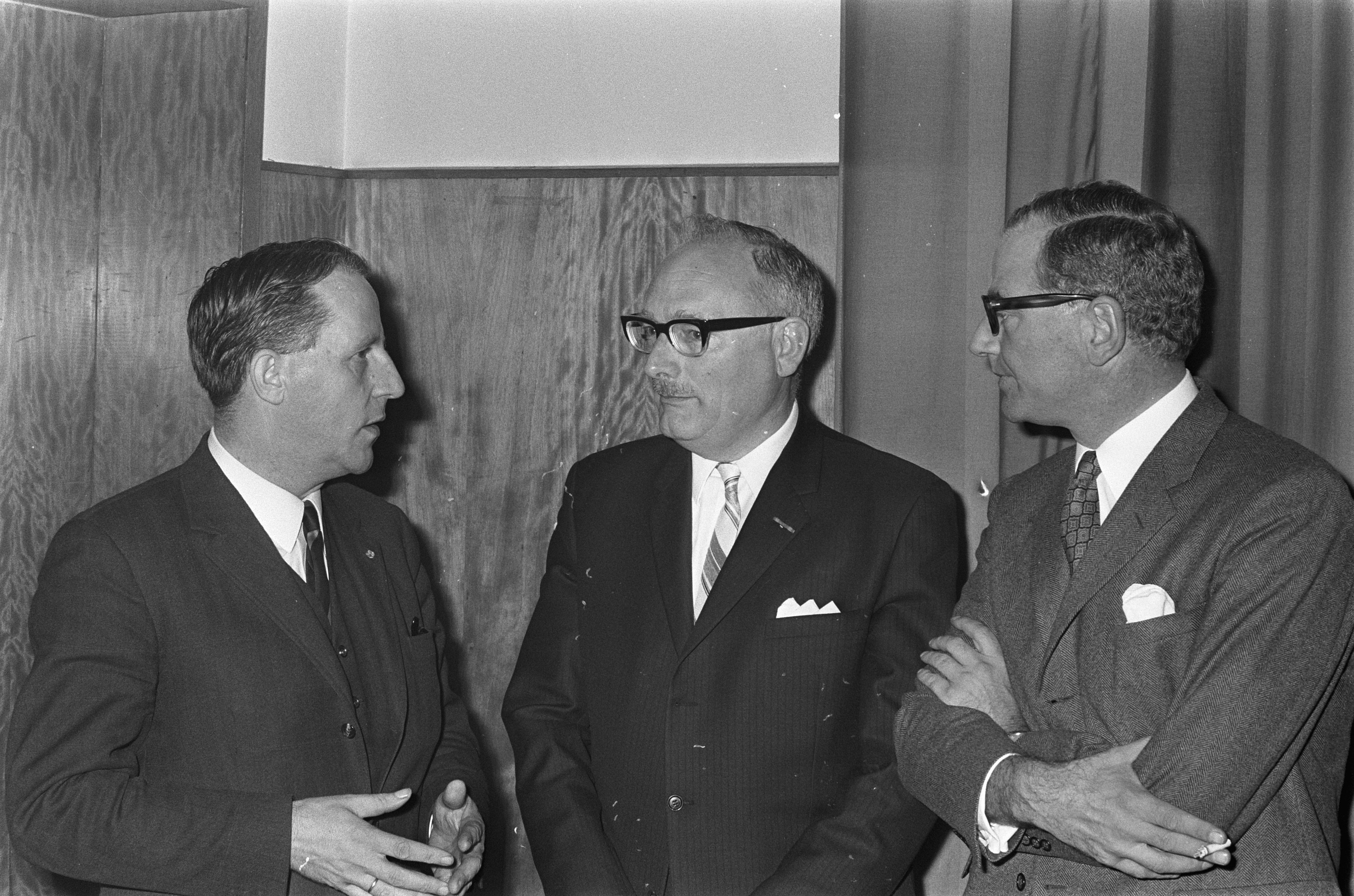
Van Hulst (centre) in 1969

Van Hulst served a member of the Senate of the Netherlands from 1956 to 1981 and from 1961 until 1968 he was a Member of the European Parliament. He also was Chairman of the CHU from 1969 until 1972.

From 1972 until 1981 Van Hulst was group leader in the Senate; first for the CHU and from 1977 on for the CDA.

=== Party chair ===
Van Hulst was elected as Chairman of the CHU on 5 October 1968 during the CHU party conference of 1968.

Van Hulst was tasked with preparing for the upcoming general election of 1971.

== Personal life ==
Van Hulst was an active chess player. In 2006, at the age of 95, he won the Corus Chess Tournament for former politicians. He won it again in 2010.

According to René van der Linden, who served as President of the Senate of the Netherlands, Van Hulst was the first former member of the Senate to reach the age of 100 since the establishment of the upper house in 1815.

On 22 March 2018, Van Hulst died at the age of 107. Amsterdam's bridge number 233 was dedicated to Van Hulst. The Johan van Hulstbrug is located in the Hortus Botanicus in Amsterdam-Centrum, near the school he managed. U.S. Ambassador to the Netherlands Pete Hoekstra stated after Van Hulst died: "Mister Van Hulst is truly an inspiration for how one person can make a real difference, even in the darkest of times." The Senate of the Netherlands commemorated Mr. Van Hulst in its plenary session of 17 April 2018.

Party political offices
Preceded by Arnold Tilanus	Chairman of the Christian Historical Union; 1968–1972	Succeeded by Otto van Verschuer
Preceded by Johannes Christiaan Bührmann	Leader of the Christian Historical Union in the Senate; 1968–1977	Party disbanded
New creation	Leader of the Christian Democratic Appeal in the Senate; 1977–1981	Succeeded by Jan Christiaanse
Records
Preceded by Marinus van der Goes van Naters	Oldest living member of the States General; 2005–2018	Succeeded by Anne Vermeer
