= List of Oh My English! episodes =

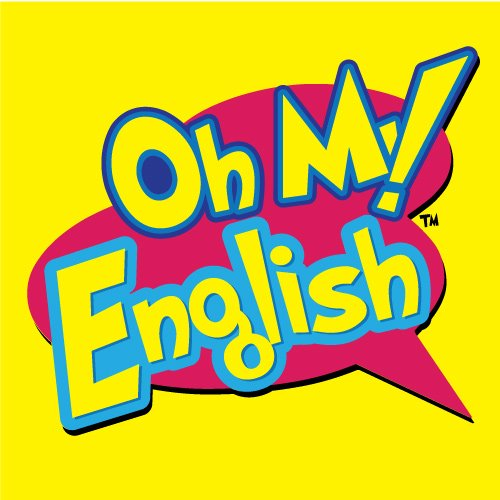

This is a list of episodes for the Malaysian educational comedy television series, Oh My English!

== Series overview ==
Season	Episodes	Originally released	
Season	Episodes	First released	Last released
1	20	May 20, 2012	September 16, 2012
2	20	March 21, 2013	July 28, 2013
3	23	May 18, 2014	October 19, 2014
4	20	June 7, 2015	December 27, 2015
5	13	July 31, 2016	October 23, 2016
6	26	October 1, 2017	December 24, 2017
Telemovie	9	November 27, 2013	March 21, 2018

== Episodes ==
=== Season 1 (2012) ===
No. overall	No. in season	Title	Original release date
Pilot	Pilot	"Behind the Scenes!"	May 13, 2012
Behind the scenes of Oh My English!
1	1	"Getting to Know You"	May 20, 2012
A 'Mat Salleh' has arrived at SMK Ayer Dalam and everyone is talking about the mysterious person's arrival. After a short introduction, the students finally learn who Mr. Henry Middleton really is.
2	2	"Yes We Can!"	May 20, 2012
Shafiq and Jibam want to try out for the football team, while Mr. Middleton gives an inspiring talk about ambition. This makes all the students, as well as Pak Sham, the school janitor, reflect on their own dreams and aspirations.
3	3	"Speak or Pay?"	May 27, 2012
Puan Hajar decides that all her students will have to speak in English – or pay 20 cents as a penalty if they speak in another language. To avoid paying up, the students must decide if they will speak English, or not say anything at all!
4	4	"Show and Tell"	June 3, 2012
5	5	"The Replacement Mak Cik"	June 10, 2012
Anusha steps in for the canteen's Mak Cik who suddenly leaves the school. Encik Mohd Salleh, on the other hand, tries to make some side income, but Puan Hajar discovers his scheme. Will the canteen Mak Cik finally return and explain her absence?
6	6	"A Piece of Cake"	June 17, 2012
Mr. Henry wants to teach his students English idioms, but they mistake it as a request to hold a party. While the students prepare for the occasion, things start to get even crazier as Henry and the students continue to misunderstand each other.
7	7	"Chickenpox"	June 24, 2012
Mr. Henry tells his students that only English is allowed in his class. Azlin falls sick, but does not know how to explain this to everyone in English. The whole class then fakes their illnesses, only to realize that they have caught measles from Pak Sham.
8	8	"Olympics"	July 1, 2012
With the Olympics just around the corner, Mr. Henry asks his students to do some research on the event. The class gets competitive and begins to steal each other’s ideas. This paves the way for a lesson on the meaning of sportsmanship.
9	9	"Flower Day"	July 8, 2012
Azlin receives a bunch of flowers from someone that likes her as a secret admirer in Hari Guru. Who will that be?
10	10	"So Hot in Here"	July 15, 2012
Hot weather at Malaysia causes Mr. Middleton to fall sick. This news spreads out throughout the school. Due to a misunderstanding, En. Mohd Salleh assumes Mr. Middleton has passed away. Eventually, Puan Hajar catches wind of the news too. What will her reaction be?
11	11	"Celebrity"	July 22, 2012
12	12	"The Blog"	July 29, 2012
13	13	"3 Merah's Got Talent!"	August 5, 2012
14	14	"Under Pressure"	August 12, 2012
15	15	"The Speech"	August 19, 2012
16	16	"Who Let The Cat Out?"	August 26, 2012
17	17	"The Great Debate"	September 2, 2012
18	18	"Jumble Sale"	September 9, 2012
19	19	"So Long Farewell (Part 1)"	September 16, 2012
20	20	"So Long Farewell (Part 2)"	September 16, 2012

=== Season 2 (2013) ===
No. overall	No. in season	Title	Original release date
Pilot	Pilot	"Behind the Scenes!"	March 24, 2013
Behind the scenes of Oh My English Season 2.
21	1	"The New Teachers"	March 31, 2013
It's the first day of the new school term, and 3 Merah have improved so much that they managed to convince Mr. Henry Middleton to stay on at SMK Ayer Dalam. A sweet-looking new Bahasa Melayu teacher, Cikgu Ayu (Tiz Zaqyah), arrives at the school.
22	2	"Who's That Guy?"	April 7, 2013
The identity of the mystery man who rescued the students is revealed. Meet Cikgu Malik (Aaron Aziz), the tough, handsome new PE teacher who is coaching the school's football team.
23	3	"Gotcha!"	April 14, 2013
It's April Fool's Day. Mr. Middleton pranks the students by saying that he will be going back to the UK soon. 3 Merah decides to get revenge on a bigger scale -- by getting the Hitz FM announcers (Jin and Ryan) to make a 'Gotcha' call to Mr. Middleton!
24	4	"New Kids On The Block"	April 21, 2013
While Hani makes an effort to make friends and fit in, Azlan starts bullying the other students. 3 Merah decides that enough is enough, but who will be brave enough to take on the bully?
25	5	"Gossip!"	April 28, 2013
The kids decide to investigate what's going on. There is so much gossip that it reaches the ears of Cikgu Malik and Encik Mohamed Salleh, and the two teachers decide to take action! Absent : Azlin and Farouk
26	6	"Mentor"	May 5, 2013
‌SMK Ayer Dalam holds a mentor program where teachers and students are paired up as mentors and mentees. Jibam and Mazlee fear the worst when they get Encik Mohd Salleh as a mentor, but surprisingly, being under his wing has a lot of benefits! Absent : Azlin
27	7	"Fearless Factor"	May 12, 2013
The girls are all panicking because they are getting the Rubella vaccination. The boys make fun of them non-stop, making their situation worse.
28	8	"Oh My Kak Hantu Mliah"	May 19, 2013
Only a handful of students gets picked for a scouts' camp, and the ones left behind are really disappointed. To cheer them up, Mr. Middleton decides to organize a camping session on the school grounds. However, the students' excitement soon turns into fear when they hear that the school may be haunted by a ghost!
29	9	"K-POP (Part 1)"	May 26, 2013
Mr. Middleton shares exciting news with the class: a new exchange student will be arriving from Korea! 3 Merah argue about who the new student might be. The girls are convinced that the exchange student will be a great dancer and start practicing their K-Pop dance moves to impress him while the boys are sure that the new Korean student will be into sports. Who got it right?
30	10	"K-POP (Part 2)"	June 2, 2013
Lee Chung Ae, the new Korean exchange student, is actually a girl! See Yew Soon falls for the new girl and tries his best to impress her. This distracts him and soon he starts to mess up everyone's orders. The other students decide that they need to make SYS forget about the Korean girl. What will happen next?
31	11	"And..Action!"	June 9, 2013
Azlin announces that she has received an offer to act in a film alongside the popular actress, Lisa Surihani (as herself). Azlin brags non-stop about her new acting job but refuses to allow anyone to come to the film set, except for Cikgu Malik, who she has appointed as her new manager. She gets upset when others from the school get invited to take part in the movie.
32	12	"Pak Sham's On Strike!"	June 16, 2013
Fed up with the students littering and messing up the school, Pak Sham goes on strike and refuses to go to work. The garbage situation gets worse and worse. Mr. Middleton decides that the kids need to take responsibility for their actions.
33	13	"Career Day"	June 23, 2013
Mr. Middleton announces that it is Career Day, and every student must present their dream career in costume. The students' imaginations run wild as they try to picture what their future jobs might be! Absent : Farouk and Anusha
34	14	"The Flood"	June 30, 2013
Oh no! There's a flood at SMK Ayer Dalam and the students and teachers are trapped inside the school. Everyone tries to stay calm and find ways to pass the time as they wait for help to arrive. But the flood worsens, and panic sets in when the boys go missing!
35	15	"One Fine Day"	July 7, 2013
Puan Hajar goes away for a while, leaving Encik Mohd Salleh in charge. All hell breaks loose! Encik Mohd Salleh starts to impose fines on the students and even teachers for the smallest things. Mr. Middleton and the students must find a way to put a stop to the fines, or lose all their money! Will they succeed?
36	16	"What's Up With Anusha!"	July 7, 2013
37	17	"And..Cut!"	July 14, 2013
There is a short film competition and 3 Merah decides to enter. The rules are that the video has to be about their school, and it must be in English. Mr. Middleton, Cikgu Malik, and the students all have different ideas about what the video should be about.
38	18	"Jibam Tube"	July 14, 2013
Jibam puts his own music video up on the internet, and soon thousands of people have 'disliked' the video! The students of 3 Merah make fun of Jibam and he becomes depressed. In an attempt to cheer him up, Puan Hajar, Hani, and Cikgu Ayu come to Jibam's rescue. See Yew Soon is inspired to follow in Jibam's footsteps.
39	19	"Double Trouble"	July 21, 2013
3 Merah go on a field trip to the Astro offices. During the tour, Mazlee and Azlin go missing as they decide to look for Datuk Aznil Haji Nawawi (as himself) on their own. While trying to find the two students, Henry is shocked when he bumps into Sara Jane (Aileen Gabriella Robinson), his ex-girlfriend from London. Will Sara convince Henry to return to the UK?
40	20	"Stuck In The Middle"	July 28, 2013
Mr. Middleton and Cikgu Ayu are starting to get closer to each other. Sara Jane, Henry's ex-girlfriend, appears at the school and asks him out for dinner in order to win him back. Henry is torn between his feelings for Sara Jane and Cikgu Ayu. Meanwhile, Cikgu Malik is also trying to woo Cikgu Ayu. Suddenly, Cikgu Ayu receives news that she must return to Terengganu. Both Mr. Middleton and Cikgu Ayu are faced with some tough decisions that will change their lives forever.

=== Season 3 (2014) ===
No. overall	No. in season	Title	Original release date
41	1	"Welcome Back, Class"	May 18, 2014
The students who are from 3 Merah are now in 4 Merah and joined by new students!
42	2	"Putri and Papa"	May 25, 2014
The new girl Putri is settling down in 4 Merah, but her overprotective father seems to be tailing her to school. How will she be able to make friends with her father scaring everybody off?
43	3	"The Club"	June 1, 2014
Looks like there are some brand new teachers in SMK Ayer Dalam! Who are they and what do they teach? How will the students react?
44	4	"Bee FF"	June 8, 2014
Guess who is back to visit her friends in SMK Ayer Dalam?
45	5	"The Birthday"	June 15, 2014
Looks like the students of 4 Merah are planning a birthday party! How exciting!
46	6	"Instafamous"	June 22, 2014
Looks like 4 Merah is obsessed with selfies this episode!
47	7	"Ramadan"	June 29, 2014
48	8	"You Jelly, Henry?"	July 13, 2014
49	9	"Bend It Like Jojie"	July 20, 2014
Girls vs Boys? Who will win the World Cup-like football competition in SMK Ayer Dalam?
50	10	"Smells Like Team Spirit"	July 27, 2014
The students of 4 Merah attempt at raising funds! Will they succeed?
51	11	"Bring It On, Ayer Cetek! (Part 1)"	August 3, 2014
The annual cheerleading competition against SMK Ayer Cetek is coming up! Will they become the champions this year?
52	12	"Hari Raya"	August 10, 2014
53	13	"Bring It On, Ayer Cetek! (Part 2)"	August 10, 2014
The day of the competition has arrived! Do you think SMK Ayer Dalam is going to win this?
54	14	"Zack in the Future"	August 17, 2014
After he falls and hits his head, Zack wakes up in the future… but how far into the future?!
55	15	"1957: Merdeka (Part 1)"	August 24, 2014
56	16	"1957: Merdeka (Part 2)"	August 31, 2014
57	17	"Oh My Kantoi!"	September 7, 2014
It looks like someone has been playing some nasty pranks on the students in Class 4 Merah! Who is this joker?!
58	18	"Cheat Sheets"	September 14, 2014
What?! Leaked exam papers?! How will the students in SMK Ayer Dalam deal with this?
59	19	"My Fair Jojie"	September 21, 2014
Jaclyn Victor is visiting SMK Ayer Dalam! Will Jojie have the confidence to be her personal guide?
60	20	"The Princess"	September 28, 2014
4 Merah is going on a cycling trip! Will Putri's dad get in the way?
61	21	"The University"	October 5, 2014
62	22	"Finale (Part 1)"	October 12, 2014
Sarjan found Cikgu Bedah's diary that fell at school's main gate, and he wants to return it. Meanwhile, the students don't want to pay their debt to See Yew Soon, to the extent that See Yew Soon was called "Ah long" by Zack.
63	23	"Finale (Part 2)"	October 19, 2014

=== Season 4 - Class of 2015 (2015) ===
No. overall	No. in season	Title	Original release date
64	1	"Strange Beginnings"	June 7, 2015
Jibam gets involved with the bullies in school, which puts his friendship with SYS to the test. Meanwhile, Mr. Middleton, now overweight, returns and faces a new threat - a charming male teacher who sweeps Cikgu Ayu off her feet.
65	2	"Bromance"	June 14, 2015
Mr. Middleton has an accident because of something Jibam did. SYS and Jibam's friendship is further tested during an investigation involving bullies and the cause of Mr. Middleton's mishap. Will this be the end of their friendship?
66	3	"Election Day"	June 21, 2015
Elections are happening at SMK Ayer Dalam to appoint new junior prefects from Form 3 students. The Senior students come up with mischievous plans to win votes, and the Juniors are sucked into their dirty game! Meanwhile, a hot new exchange student from United States, Taylor Marie Smith, replaces Putri, who is away on the same program.
67	4	"Liar, Liar School On Fire"	June 28, 2015
One of the modified electrical extensions that Jibam and SYS brought to school causes an actual fire to break out in 5 Merah, and their friendship undergoes the final test when Cikgu Ariff interrogates them about their involvement in the incident.
68	5	"Zero to Hero"	July 5, 2015
Mr. Middleton feels that his weight issue causes problems, including the past incident of not being able to save Ayu from the fire. He decides to get help from Zack's uncle, a famous fitness guru. However, Henry's plan to get back his physique backfires after he decides to take a shortcut and realizes his mistake.
69	6	"The Sisterhood Of Ayer Dalam"	July 12, 2015
Taylor Marie Smith agrees to help her undergrad friend, Saleha, in her final year project, but her good intentions have caused problems that could compromise Saleha's project.
70	7	"To Do or Not To Do"	July 19, 2015
A little girl, Qistina, introduces the concept of 'Paying it forward': do good and good will come to you. Everyone believes in the idea, expect Jojie, who is adamant that doing good deeds amounts to nothing.
71	8	"Zack and Taylor vs The World"	July 26, 2015
The students are transported into a game world where Zack and Taylor have to save Mazlee and themselves from the villain, Henry the Vampire King, and his minions.
72	9	"Henry Version 2.0"	August 2, 2015
Mr. Middleton is now all buffed up and physically fit. However, he has become vain and obsessive about his new fitness regime! Cikgu Ayu takes to sharing her worries about Mr. Middleton with Cikgu Ariff, and they become closer.
73	10	"Who's Leaving Now?"	August 9, 2015
Cikgu Ayu rejects Mr. Middleton's confession saying that she does not like the new him. He soon realizes that Ayu's happiness is more important than his own and volunteers himself to be transferred to another school.
74–75	11–12	"Sir, Come Baaackkk"	November 1, 2015
In the absence of Mr. Middleton, Class 5 Merah gets a whole host of English teachers, none of whom they are fond of. Then, Cikgu Nurul, a naive English substitute teacher, enters.
76	13	"Energy Lives Here"	November 8, 2015
Sayur is participating in a science competition organized by ExxonMobil which will be broadcast on TV. Despite having a good plan for the project, they lack confidence in public speaking with millions of TV viewers expected to watch.
77	14	"Ghostbusters"	November 15, 2015
78	15	"The Sam Scam"	November 22, 2015
79	16	"The Swap"	November 29, 2015
80	17	"Selfiethon"	December 6, 2015
81	18	"The Middletons"	December 13, 2015
82	19	"The Future"	December 20, 2015
83	20	"Friends Forever"	December 27, 2015

=== Season 5 - After School (2016) ===
- Jibam is absent three and a half episodes.

No. overall	No. in season	Title	Original release date
84	1	"New Journey"	July 31, 2016
After SPM, See Yew Soon is mysteriously kidnapped while working on the street. It is revealed that the kidnapper, Mr. A, wants him to run a café business. See Yew Soon seeks the help of his friends Zack and Jibam on this business venture. Although initially skeptical, they eventually decide to help their friend. The boys get off to a clumsy start with their first customer, Zul (Kamal Adli), and they end up accidentally creating their first specialty – “Flooded Ro-Tea” - by spilling Teh Tarik on a plate of Roti Canai. To their surprise, it is unexpectedly well received by the customer and the boys now feel confident about running the café. However, they also freak out after finding mysterious gift boxes, one of which contains a talking watch called Mia. Little do they know, Mr. A has been observing them the entire time. Special appearance: Kamal Adli
85	2	"Hostage Situation"	August 7, 2016
The café is now open, but the boys are still struggling to turn it into a successful business. Of course, it does not help that Zack gets ‘flour’ and ‘flowers’ mixed up, which delays Jibam from making “Flooded Ro-Tea” for the customers and forcing See Yew Soon to keep them entertained until their food arrives. The situation quickly worsens and becomes an unexpected hostage situation! The police are called and the media arrive to cover the sensational story. Before they know it, the boys are all over the national news! Meanwhile, they are still trying to keep Mia, the AI watch, a secret. However, she is getting very chatty and keeps getting them in trouble with her spontaneous corrections and advice.
86	3	"Café, Transform!"	August 14, 2016
News of the recent hostage situation at the café reaches Taylor (Juliana Evans). She is concerned and drops by to see how the boys are getting on. However, she is horrified to discover that the café is not in good shape, so she gives the place a makeover. While the café is being painted to spruce it up, a permanent mark is accidentally made on the wall. Special appearance: Juliana Evans
87	4	"Amelia"	August 21, 2016
After the café’s makeover, business starts to pick up and the boys begin getting regular customers. However, their clumsy and fun-loving ways lead to a small kitchen fire while they are having trouble dealing with customers. In the chaos that follows, they are rescued by Amelia (Amelia Henderson), a beautiful customer who Zack immediately falls in love with. He hires her as a part time waitress on the spot without discussing it with See Yew Soon. See Yew Soon is not happy with the decision and wants to fire her immediately. Special appearance: Amelia Henderson
88	5	"Chicken Rice Frenzy!"	August 28, 2016
Customers are starting to get bored with "Flooded Ro-Tea" and want something new. However, the boys have nothing else on the menu to offer. Zack takes a special order from a regular female customer who is very cute! She orders chicken rice which he buys from Mak Yam's nearby stall and serves to her. Amelia sees it and thinks they have a new dish so she starts offering it to other customers, but Jibam does not know how to cook chicken rice. In desperation to serve the customers, they decide to buy all the chicken rice from Mak Yam's stall and serve it to their customers at a higher price. Mak Yam catches them doing it, and they are forced to prepare their own chicken rice.
89	6	"Kitchen Torment"	September 4, 2016
The boys call for an open audition to fill the position of Head Chef. They taste a sample dish cooked by a mystery chef and are immediately mesmerised by its taste and flavour. To their surprise, it is Cikgu Bedah’s cooking. Cikgu Bedah forcefully takes over as Head Chef because she knows it is the boys’ café. Cikgu Bedah gives them an intensive Hell's Kitchen class while the boys cause trouble and try to sabotage her in the hope she will leave. Special appearance: Sherry Alhadad
90	7	"On Repeat"	September 11, 2016
Hoping to obtain additional publicity, See Yew Soon and the boys decide to turn their café into a soup kitchen offering free food for the homeless. However, during the day, See Yew Soon, who has been stingy and insincere with his intentions, wakes up to the same day over and over again. He has to figure out why this is happening and how to stop the day from recurring. Special appearance: Nad Zainal
91	8	"The Silent Lost Boy"	September 18, 2016
A seemingly mute boy enters the café looking lost. With Jibam away, See Yew Soon and Zack are shorthanded and a mute, lost boy messing around in the café does not help. The two of them try to figure out why he is at the café, but with no information coming from the boy, they have no ideas. The two boys decide to do the responsible thing by taking turns to ensure the well-being of the boy. They learn various methods of babysitting and solve the problems that the boy causes. They soon get used to and attached to the boy. Special appearance: Fikry Ceria Popstar Absent: Jibam
92	9	"Musical Dream"	September 25, 2016
The boys become comfortable and complacent as the café business starts to do really well. Each of the boys are put to the test on their priorities as they have to decide whether they would like to pursue their after school dreams and leaving See Yew Soon on his own managing the café. A customer who happens to be a talent scout offers a record deal to Zack as he sees Zack's potential after hearing him rap while he is serving. Zack has to decide whether to pursue his dream or continue his promise to build the café business together with his friends. In the meantime, in Jibam’s absence, it is discovered the assistant cooks cannot cook! Special appearance: Altimet Absent : Jibam
93	10	"Locked Up"	October 2, 2016
The boys accidentally get locked in the storeroom and start blaming each other. They have to work together to get out. Meanwhile, Taylor who happens to visit the café, meets Amelia, and they don't quite see eye to eye.
94	11	"Sabotage"	October 9, 2016
Mak Yam loses her customers and finds out they have all gone to After School Café. She disguises herself and plots to put them out of business by sabotaging them. The café is permanently closed down by Penguatkuasa Kebersihan dan Kesihatan (PKK) for uncleanliness (cockroach infestation). The boys end up at Mak Yam's stall feeling really emotional and convinced that their business is coming to an end. Special appearance: Didie Alias
95	12	"Fright Night"	October 16, 2016
The boys are given a second chance by Penguatkuasa Kebersihan dan Kesihatan (PKK) to get their cafe's cleanliness checked again the next day, so they can re-open the café for business. The boys and Amelia work hard to get every inch cleaned. However, there's a mysterious being haunting them late at night. The boys are more afraid than Amelia. Will they survive the night?
96	13	"Undercover VIP"	October 23, 2016
The boys and Amelia are exhausted due to the late night cleaning. Amelia has got to leave but invited her cousin, Lisa, (Lisa Surihani) to cover for her. They are on their toes, looking out for the undercover PKK Inspector (Yusry Abdul Halim), knowing that their efforts will either make or break their business. They start to suspect every customer who comes in, doing a great job and being extra careful with everybody. Things go wrong when a cockroach that they have missed comes back to haunt them. Special appearances: Lisa Surihani and Yusry Abdul Halim

=== Season 6 - Level Up! (2017) ===
No. overall	No. in season	Title	Original release date
97	1	"Level Up!"	October 1, 2017
3 Merah is excited to return to school, where they met new teachers in English Class
98	2	"The English Teacher"	October 1, 2017
Puan Hajar brings Mr. Blond (a.k.a. James Blond) as the new 3 Merah English Teacher as previous teachers were not so great.
99	3	TBA	October 8, 2017
100	4	TBA	October 8, 2017
101	5	"Malaysia Day"	October 15, 2017
102	6	TBA	October 15, 2017
103	7	TBA	October 22, 2017
104	8	TBA	October 22, 2017
105	9	TBA	October 29, 2017
106	10	TBA	October 29, 2017
107	11	"The Music Class"	November 5, 2017
108	12	"Mawar's Idol"	November 5, 2017
Mawar Idol came to visit as a guest to SMK Ayer Dalam to meet the students of SMK Ayer Dalam.
109	13	"Mr. Blond VS. Teacher Zack"	November 12, 2017
Mr. Blond and Zack decide to run a competition to see which of the teachers coach their students best.
110	14	TBA	November 12, 2017
111	15	"The Commercial Of Star"	November 19, 2017
3 Merah auditions for the Vitagen commercial. Meanwhile, Cikgu Yusof tries to get on the commercial too.
112	16	"Samiona"	November 19, 2017
Sam and Fiona are participating in science competitions. Cikgu Bedah and Miss Soo are judging the competition.
113	17	"Masterchef"	November 26, 2017
114	18	"Camping (Part 1)"	November 26, 2017
3 Merah, Cikgu Bedah, and Mr. Blond go camping in the forest. Note : This episode continues on the next episode.
115	19	"Lost In The Forest (Part 2)"	December 3, 2017
After Ronaldo and Amelia are lost in the forest, 3 Merah and the teachers try to find them.
116	20	"Fiona Other Side"	December 3, 2017
When Fiona's favorite person arrives and encourages her, Fiona changes so much that her friends can't even recognize her.
117	21	"Canteen Day (Part 1)"	December 10, 2017
118	22	"Ghost Room (Part 2)"	December 10, 2017
119	23	"The Legend Story (Part 1)"	December 17, 2017
120	24	"The Legend Story (Part 2)"	December 17, 2017
121	25	"Love Liars (Part 1)"	December 24, 2017
122	26	"Love Liars (Part 2)"	December 24, 2017

=== Telemovie ===
Season	Film	Title	Original release date
S2	1	"Oh My Ganu"	November 27, 2013
Henry is torn between two choices: to go after Cikgu Ayu or Sarah Jane. The gang decides to travel all the way to Terengganu to search for Cikgu Ayu, but someone in the village plans to marry Cikgu Ayu. Will the gang succeed to foil the plans of the billionaire and bring Cikgu Ayu back to SMK Ayer Dalam?
S2	2	"Oh My English : Hello America!"	January 19, 2014
The gang of SMK Ayer Dalam win a trip to the United States as a grand prize in the Best Short Film Competition. However, things go wrong when Jibam and See Yew Soon wander around New York and end up in Washington, DC causing extreme panic to the rest of the group.
S3	3	"Oh My English : Villa Isabella"	December 27, 2014
With Sarjan at the wheel, the 4 Merah gang is visiting See Yew Soon in Singapore after his sudden departure from SMK Ayer Dalam. However, their van breaks down during the trip, and they stumble upon the eerie Villa Isabella. The sole resident of Villa Isabella, a mysterious woman in red, invites them to stay for the night. As expected, strange things start to happen during their stay...
S4	4	"Oh My Goat - Come Baaaack!"	September 15, 2015
The story begins with Henry on a bumpy journey to SK Dalam Ayer, a rural school. Henry has high hopes for a new future. He is living alone in a strange place with only basic facilities. To make matters worse, Henry struggles to win the hearts and respect of his new students who turn out to be a bunch of unruly misfits. Apart from a stray goat to keep him company, Henry is lonely in Dalam Ayer. Meanwhile back in Ayer Dalam, Cikgu Ayu and Encik Ariff are becoming closer, and the students of 5 Merah want Henry to come back and stop them from potentially getting married. The students plan a trip to visit Henry. During their stay at Dalam Ayer, a storm breaks out, placing Henry and everyone in a dire situation. Now both the students and Cikgu Ayu want Henry to come back to Ayer Dalam. Henry is in a dilemma. Will he choose Ayer Dalam or Dalam Ayer?
S4	5	"Oh My Ganu 2"	January 16, 2016
With two choices and two endings, will Cikgu Ayu, who has lost her memory, choose Zizang (Zizan Razak) or Mr Middleton (Zain Saidin)?
S4	6	"Oh My Ganu 2 - Alternate Ending"	January 25, 2016
S5	7	"Oh My English : Road to Jogja (Part 1)"	December 4, 2016
See Yew Soon, Zack and Mazlee find three secret ingredients in Malaysia which may be able to save their café business.
S5	8	"Oh My English : Road to Jogja (Part 2)"	December 11, 2016
See Yew Soon, Zack, and Mazlee go to Yogjakarta, Indonesia for an international cooking competition.
S6	9	"Oh My Reunion!"	March 21, 2018
SMK Ayer Dalam is celebrating its 50th school anniversary. However, things start to go spookily wrong at the chosen venue.
