= Walter Süskind =

German Jew who helped about 600 Jewish children escape the Holocaust

- Born: 29 October 1906; Lüdenscheid, Westphalia, Germany
- Died: 28 February 1945 (aged 38)

Walter Süskind (29 October 1906 – 28 February 1945) was a German Jew who helped about 600 Jewish children escape the Holocaust. He was a member of the Jewish Council of Amsterdam (Joodsche Raad or Judenrat) during the Second World War.

== Biography ==
Süskind was born in Lüdenscheid in Germany as the first child of Hermann Süskind and Frieda Kessler. He had two younger brothers, Karl Süskind (1908) and Alfred Süskind (1911).

Süskind initially worked as a manager of a margarine factory in Germany. In March 1938, he fled to the Netherlands with the intention of emigrating to the United States, because of the persecution of Jews by the Nazis. From 1942 until his deportation to Westerbork, he lived at Nieuwe Prinsengracht 51 in the center of Amsterdam with his wife Johanna Natt (1 November 1906 – 1944) and their daughter Yvonne Süskind. During the Second World War he became involved in helping children escape the Holocaust via the nursery on the Plantage Middenlaan in Amsterdam.

Süskind worked for the Dutch Jewish council. He was the manager of the Hollandsche Schouwburg (Dutch Theater), where the Jews of Amsterdam had to report prior to their deportation to the Westerbork transit camp. In that position he could manipulate the personal data of children in particular. His close relationship with the German authorities helped him in his activities to help children escape. He especially tried to get close to the SS officer Ferdinand aus der Fünten, who was then the second man of the Central Office for Jewish Emigration in Amsterdam.

Opposite the Hollandsche Schouwburg on the Plantage Middenlaan, there was a nursery. The Nazis put the young children there instead of in the theater. The Jewish director of the nursery, Henriette Henriques Pimentel, together with Süskind and economist Felix Halverstad (who also worked at the Hollandsche Schouwburg), set up a system to rescue children via the nursery. Children were secretly brought to the Hervormde Kweekschool (Reformed Teacher Training College), two houses from the theater. They got there through the garden. They received help from the head of the school, Johan van Hulst. From there, the children went into a backpack, shopping bag or laundry basket to be transported to Limburg and Friesland by train and tram, often with help from the Utrechts Kindercomité (Utrecht Children's Committee) of Piet Meerburg and the NV, a secret organization that managed to organize many addresses in Limburg. Süskind and Felix Halverstad ensured that these children were not registered and removed their names from the records of the theater. Thanks to this plan, about 600 children were saved.

In 1944, Süskind, his wife and his daughter were sent to the Westerbork transit camp. Due to his good relations with the SS leadership of the Dutch Theater, he was allowed to return to Amsterdam, but he eventually went back to his family in Westerbork. He also wanted to help people escape from the transit camp, but failed. His wife and daughter later died at the camp, and he himself died on 28 February 1945 at an unknown location in central Europe during the death marches.

== Movie ==
On 19 January 2012, the Dutch movie Süskind was released. This movie is based on the life of Walter Süskind.

== Book ==
The book Süskind written by Dutch author Alex van Galen describes Walter Süskinds life when working for the Hollandsche Schouwburg.

The book The Heart Has Reasons: Dutch Rescuers of Jewish Children during the Holocaust written by the U.S. author Mark Klempner tells Suskind's story within the chapter about Pieter Meerburg.
