= Anna Rosa Drukker =

- Born: Anna Rosa van Dam; 15 September 1916; Rotterdam, Netherlands
- Died: 9 August 2010 (aged 93); Jerusalem, Israel
- Occupation: Physician
- Spouse: Meir Drukker

Hannah Rosa Drukker-van Dam (born Anna Rosa "Ans" van Dam; 15 September 1916 – 9 August 2010) was an Israeli physician and resistance fighter who saved 35 Jewish children and many Jewish adults during the Holocaust.

== Early life ==
Drukker was born in Rotterdam as Anna van Dam to Abraham van Dam and Nel Olf. Her mother was a Protestant who converted to Reform Judaism in 1915, after which the family moved to Hilversum, near Amsterdam. In 1926, she underwent an Orthodox conversion along with her mother.

== World War II and the Holocaust ==
Drukker was a medical student in Amsterdam when the Netherlands was occupied in May 1940. Following the bombing of Rotterdam, which destroyed the city's population records, she was able to register as a non-Jew (classified as a first-degree Mischling after an appeal). This status granted her relative freedom of movement and an identity card without the "J" stamp, allowing her to move between Jewish and Christian communities without immediate suspicion.

Drukker joined the student resistance and focused on rescuing Jewish infants and children from the Jewish Theater of Amsterdam, where they were held prior to deportation. She smuggled these children to Christian families in the south of the Netherlands. She also secured a hiding place for Nathan Dasberg, the brother of Shimon Dasberg.

In late November 1943, she was arrested by the Germans in connection with the rescue of a Jewish girl. She was interrogated by the Gestapo for three weeks to no avail. Consequently, she was deported to Auschwitz. Thanks to her medical background, she worked in the camp clinic, often treating prisoners with minimal equipment, reportedly carrying only a single thermometer. She used her knowledge of several languages, including German, to negotiate for supplies and improve conditions for herself and other inmates. She was later transferred to Kaufering and later Mühldorf camps by her request.

== Life in Israel ==
After the war, van Dam returned to her home in the Netherlands and reunited with her family. She completed her medical studies and married Dr. Meir Drukker. In 1953, they immigrated to Israel with their children. Drukker worked as a physician in Netzer Sereni and at the Ma'abara community of Be'er Ya'akov. In 1957, they moved to Jerusalem.

During the Yom Kippur War, she joined a unit notifying families of the deaths of their relatives. One day, her colleagues from the casualty notification unit appeared at her home, informing her that her son Micha, an officer in the Armored Corps, had been killed west of the Suez Canal.

She died in Jerusalem in 2010, at age 93.
