= Henriëtte Pimentel =

Dutch teacher and resistance worker

Henriëtte Henriquez Pimentel
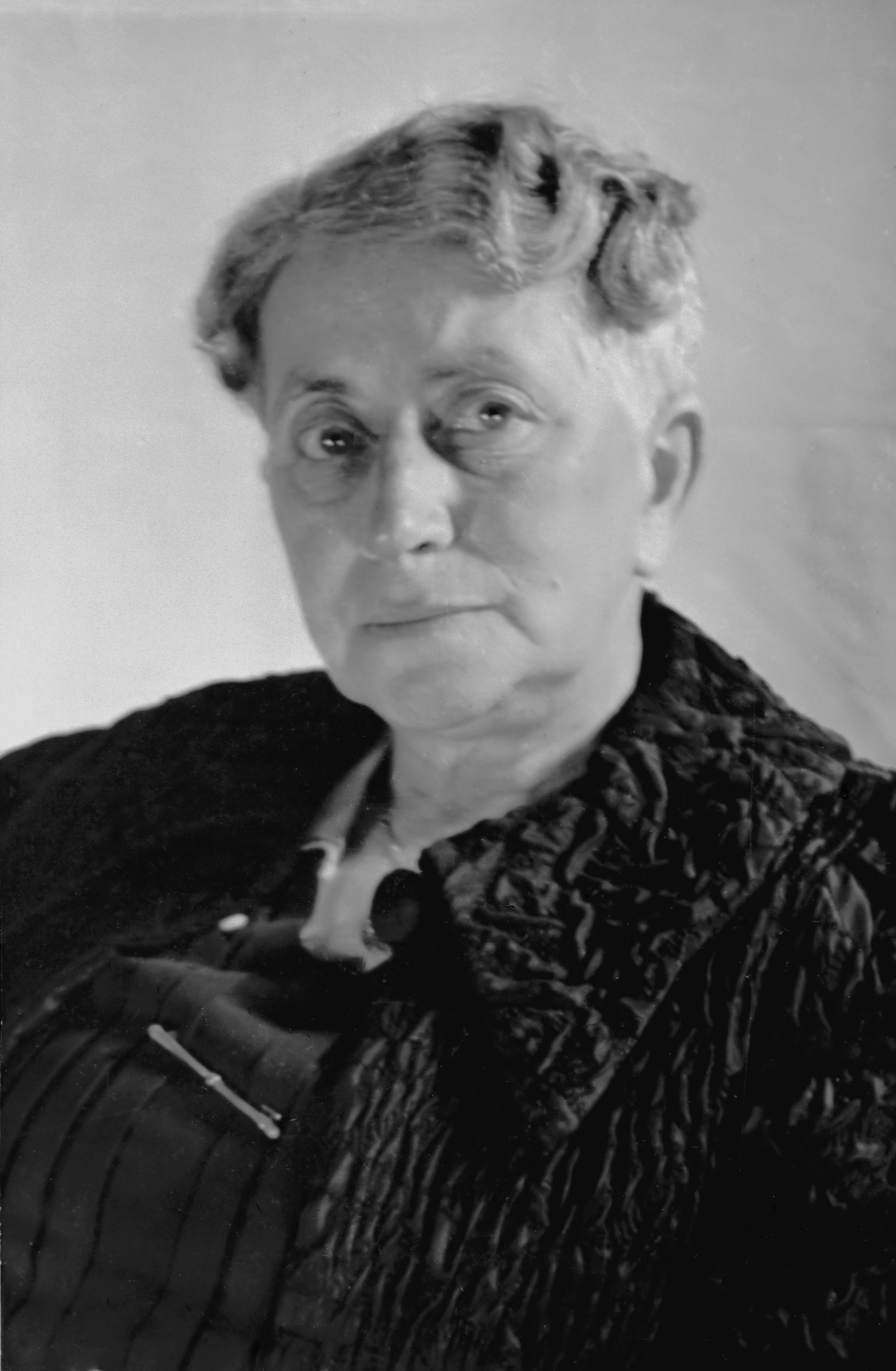
- Born: 17 April 1876; Amsterdam, the Netherlands
- Died: 17 September 1943 (aged 67)
- Occupations: Resistance fighter, teacher, nurse
- Parents: Nathan Henriquez Pimentel (father); Rachel Oppenheimer (mother)

Henriëtte Henriquez Pimentel (17 April 1876 – 17 September 1943) was a Dutch teacher and trained nurse who during the Second World War headed a crèche in Amsterdam which cared for small children while their parents were forcibly detained by the Nazis. Together with Walter Süskind and Johan van Hulst, from around October 1942 she helped to save the lives of hundreds of Jewish infants by smuggling them into the homes of sympathetic host families. After being arrested by the Nazis in April 1943, she was murdered in the Auschwitz concentration camp the following September.

== Biography ==
Born in Amsterdam on 17 April 1876, Henriëtte Henriquez Pimentel was the youngest daughter of the diamond cutter Nathan Henriquez Pimentel (1837–1893) and Rachel Oppenheimer (1841–1929). She was of Portuguese-Jewish descent. Together with her seven siblings, she was brought up in a well family. After following a teacher's training course, in the 1920s she worked as a governess and a kindergarten teacher in Bussum. As she had also trained as a nurse, in 1926 she was appointed director of the Vereeniging Zuigelingen-Inrichting en Kindertehuis (Crèche and Kindergarten Institute) in Amsterdam. Founded with support from a Jewish legacy, it was a large, well-fitted modern establishment on the Plantage Middenlaan which accommodated up to a hundred infants and toddlers who were cared for by a team of mainly Jewish staff.

In 1941, as a result of the German occupation, Pimentel was forced to dismiss her non-Jewish colleagues. By autumn 1942, the crèche had become a hostel accommodating Jewish children whose parents were taken to the Hollandsche Schouwburg on the other side of the street. Once a theatre, it had been converted into a centre for Jews scheduled for deportation to the Westerbork transit camp.

The children in the crèche were also to be sent to Westerbork. In collaboration with Walter Süskind at the Jewish Council and Johan van Hulst who ran the neighbouring teachers training college, Pimentel made arrangements for as many as possible to be smuggled out to families willing to look after them, some as far away as Friesland or Limburg. For several months, the scheme went undetected as the children's names were removed from the transport schedules. Some of them were temporarily housed in the teacher's training college, while others were cared for by student groups or other resistance cells. Some sources estimate that up to a thousand were saved in this way, others around 500, but the large majority continued to be deported. The operation was code-named "N.V.", short for Naamloze Vennootschap meaning "limited company."

The Nazis arrived at the crèche on 23 July 1943, removing all the remaining children and all the staff. Pimentel was sent first to Westerbork, then to Auschwitz where she was murdered around 17 September 1943.
