= Anne Vermeer =

Dutch politician (1916–2018)

His Excellency Anne Vermeer
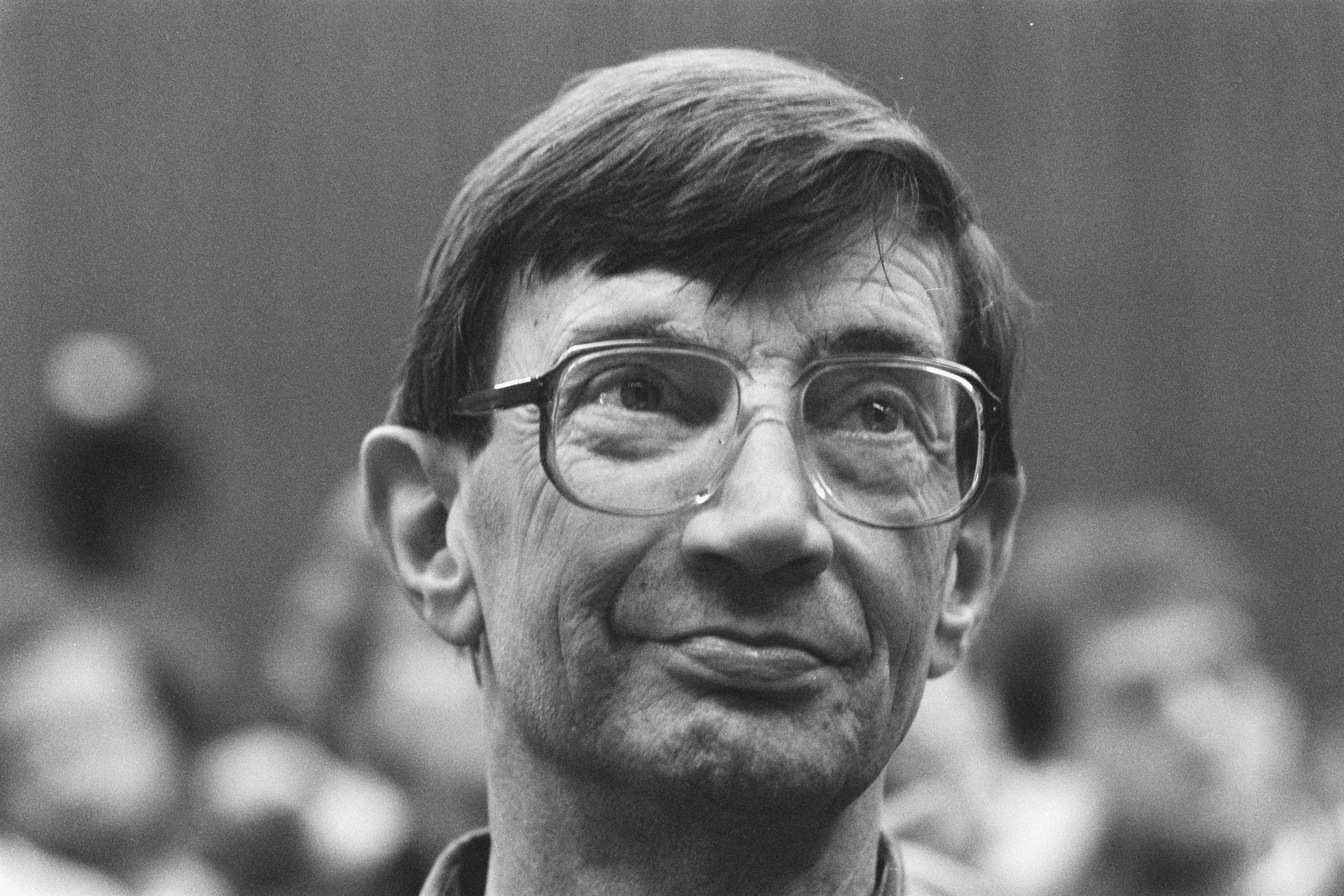
- Anne Vermeer in 1987

Mayor of Amersfoort
- In office 1 January 1976 – 1 January 1982
- Preceded by: Maurits Troostwijk
- Succeeded by: Bert Schreuder

Parliamentary leader in the Senate
- In office 16 September 1975 – 23 June 1987
- Preceded by: Jan Broeksz
- Succeeded by: Ger Schinck
- Parliamentary group: Labour Party

Member of the Senate
- In office 20 September 1966 – 23 June 1987
- Parliamentary group: Labour Party

Member of the House of Representatives
- In office 3 July 1956 – 5 June 1963
- Parliamentary group: Labour Party

Personal details
- Born: Anne Rinse Vermeer; 12 December 1916 Tiel, Netherlands
- Died: 26 July 2018 (aged 101) Amersfoort, Netherlands
- Party: Labour Party (from 1946)
- Other political affiliations: Social Democratic; Workers' Party (until 1946)
- Education: Erasmus University Rotterdam (Bachelor of Economics, Master of Economics)
- Occupation: Politician · economist · teacher

Anne Rinse Vermeer (12 December 1916 – 26 July 2018) was a Dutch politician of the Labour Party (PvdA).

== Decorations ==
Honours
| Ribbon bar | Honour | Country | Date | Comment |
| | Knight of the Order of the Netherlands Lion | Netherlands | 31 January 1971 | |
| | Commander of the Order of Orange-Nassau | Netherlands | 1 January 1982 | |

Party political offices
| Preceded by Jan Broeksz | Parliamentary leader of the Labour Party in the Senate; 1975–1987 | Succeeded by Ger Schinck |
Political offices
| Preceded by Maurits Troostwijk | Mayor of Amersfoort; 1976–1982 | Succeeded by Bert Schreuder |
Records
| Preceded by Johan van Hulst | Oldest living member of the States General; 2018 | Succeeded by Johan Witteveen |
