= Zain Saidin =

Malaysian model and actor

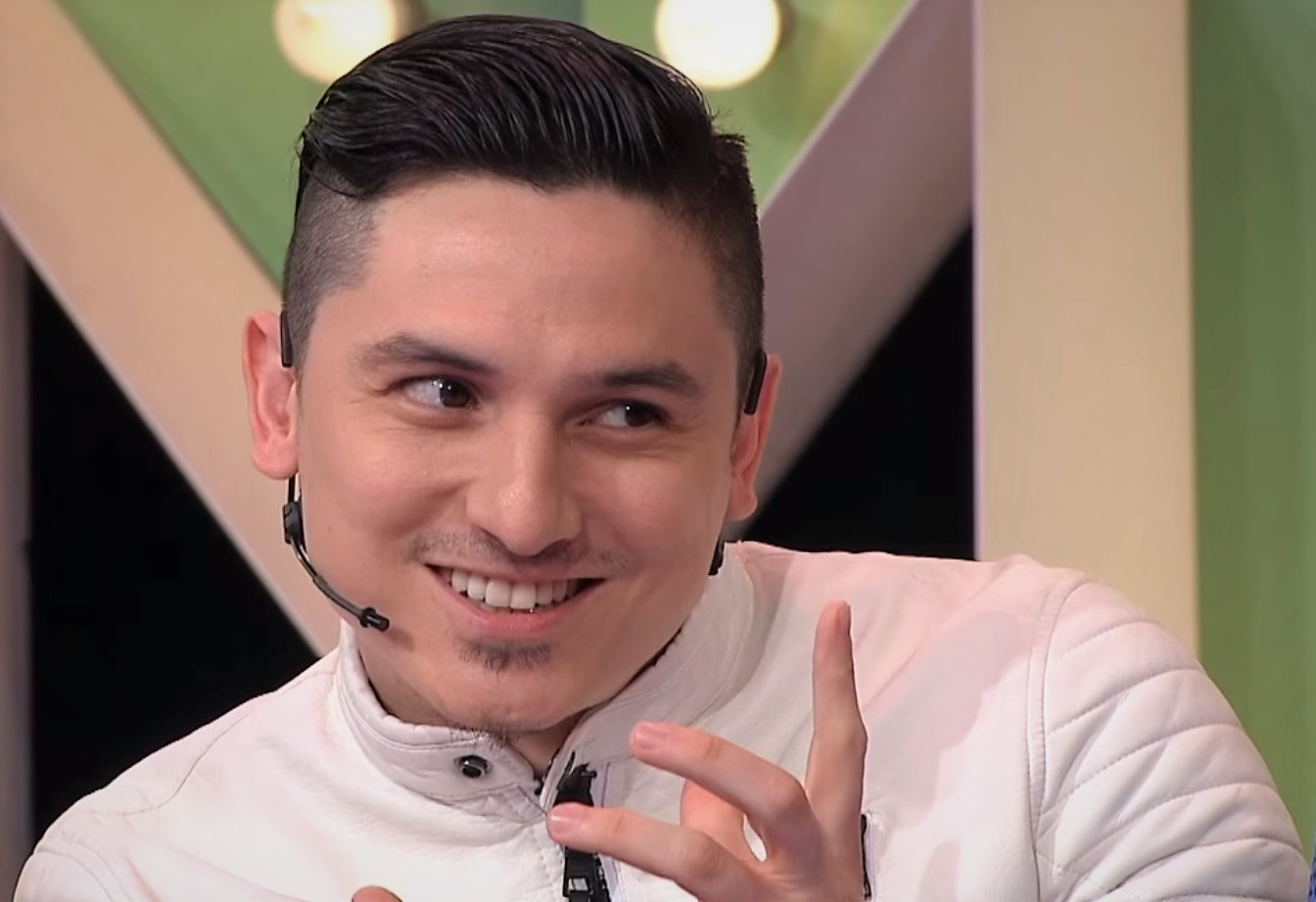
- Saidin on MeleTOP in 2015
- Born: Mohamad Zain bin Mohd Saidin; 23 February 1984 (age 42); Bangsar, Kuala Lumpur Malaysia
- Occupation: Actor
- Years active: 2009—present
- Spouse: Rozita Che Wan (m. 2013)
- Children: 1. Ammar Effendy Azuar Effendy; (step-son); 2. Aniq Ezra Azuar Effendy (step-son); 3. Aaisyah Dhia Rana Mohamad Zain (daughter)
- Parent(s): Mohd Saidin Osman; Siti Aisyah Abdullah

Mohamad Zain bin Mohd Saidin (born 23 February 1984) is a Malaysian actor and model. He is best known as the character Henry Middleton on the Astro TVIQ series Oh My English!

== Career ==
Zain has been involved in the acting world for a long time, though it is only in recent years that he had taken on more prominent roles in various productions. He has acted in various dramas, amongst others Kiah Pekasam, Awan Dania 3 and Gemersik Kalbu.

In 2012, he joined the cast of the series Oh My English! (a language education comedy akin to Extr@) on Astro TVIQ, taking on the role of the main character Henry Middleton, the half-British English teacher from the United Kingdom.

== Early life ==
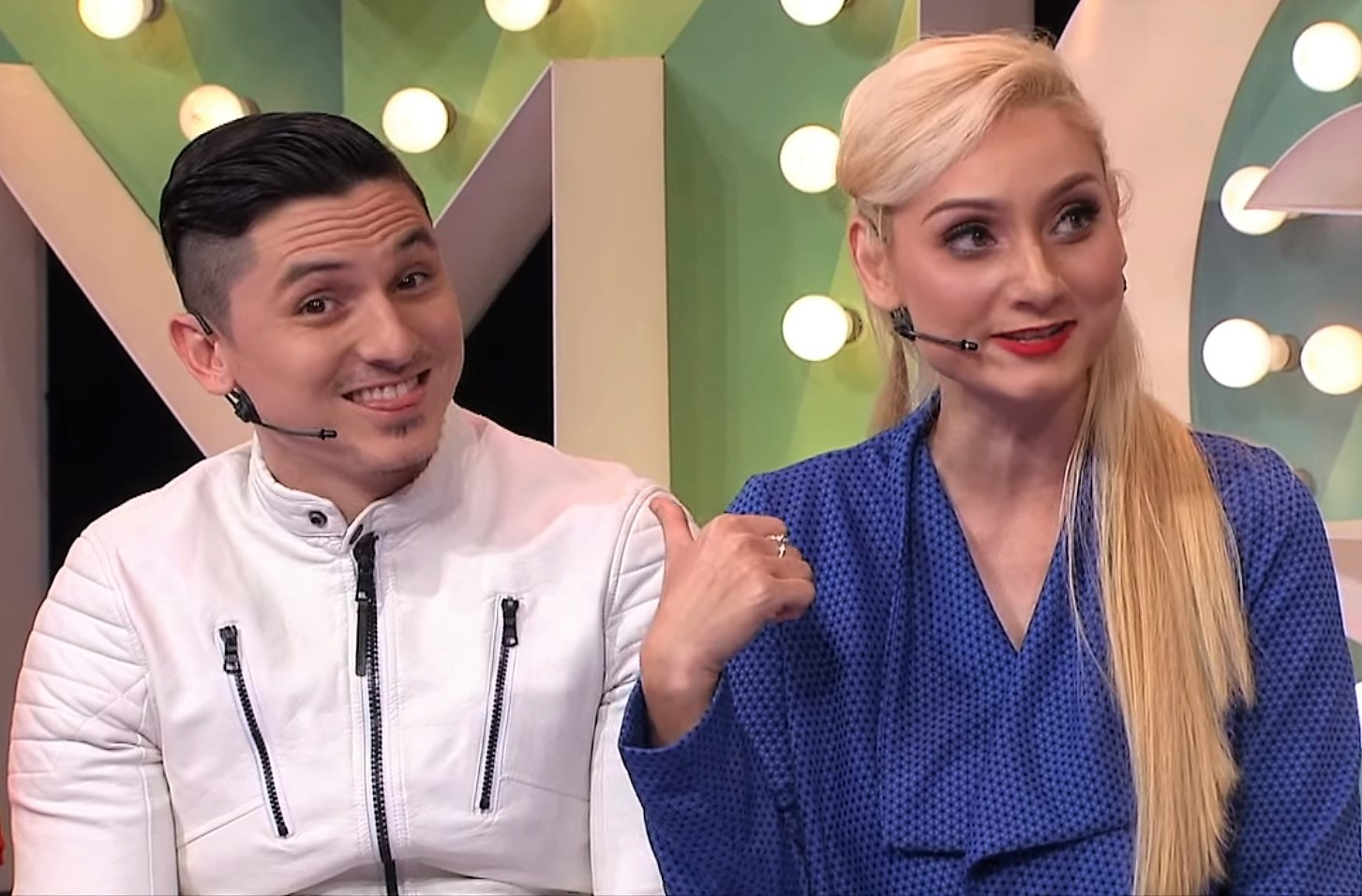
Zain and Sasha Saidin on MeleTOP in 2015

Zain was born on 23 February 1984 and comes from Bangsar, Kuala Lumpur. He is the youngest brother of four siblings and has a mixed Malay-English parentage. His sister Sasha Saidin is also an actress and singer for already defunct girls band in the 90's, Elite.

Prior to joining the entertainment industry in his mid-20s, Zain worked as a personal trainer.

== Personal life ==
Zain married actress Rozita Che Wan on 13 December 2013. The couple have a daughter born on 1 November 2014.

== Filmography ==
=== Films ===
Year	Title	Role	Notes
2015	Love Supermoon	Fakrul	

=== Television series ===
Year	Title	Role	TV Network
2010	Kiah Perkasam	Rodi	Astro Warna
2010	Mistik Alam Hitam		Astro Ria & Astro Prima
2011	Terowong: Mesej Puaka	Aliff	TV3
2011	Awan Dania (Musim 3)	–	Astro Ria
2012	Naziha	Amri	TV3
2012	Gemersik Kalbu	Hisyam	TV3
2012	Friday I'm In Love	Zane	TV9
2012	Evolusi Kl Drift : The Series	Sham	TV2
2012	Oh My English! season 1	Henry Middleton	Astro TVIQ
2013	Oh My English! season 2	Henry Middleton	Astro TVIQ
2013	Oh My Ganu!	Henry Middleton	Astro TVIQ and Astro Maya HD
2014	Oh My English! season 3	Henry Middleton	Astro TVIQ and Astro Maya HD
2014	Oh My English! Villa Isabella	Henry Middleton	Astro TVIQ and Astro Maya HD
2015	Cucur Bawang Kopi O	Iskandar	TV1
2016	Cinta 100kg	Shahril	TV3
2018	Kelip-Kelip Di Kota London	Saddiq	TV3

=== Telemovies ===
Year	Title	Role	TV Network
2010	Kau Yang Satu	Jeff	TV3
2011	Alin ke... Elin ?		TV2
2013	Menantu Raya	Mikail	TV3
2013	Bukan Cinta Monyet	Alvin	TV3
2015	Oh My Goat! Come Backkkkk!	Henry Middleton	Astro Prima, Astro TVIQ & Astro Maya HD
2016	Oh My Ganu! 2 The Original Ending	Henry Middleton	Astro Prima, Astro TVIQ & Astro Maya HD
2016	Oh My Ganu! 2 The Alternate Ending	Henry Middleton	Astro TVIQ & Astro Ceria
2017	Janjikan Aku Bahagia	Malique	TV2

=== Television ===
Year	Title	Role	TV Network
2014	Fear Factor Malaysia Season 2		Astro Ria
2015	Jangan Gelak		
2016	Lari Bersama Prosperity		

=== Music video ===
Year	Song Title	Artist	Ref
2013	"Lebih Indah"	Datuk Sri Siti Nurhaliza	
