= Lars Oostveen =

Dutch presenter, producer and actor

Lars Oostveen (born 6 September 1976 in Heiloo, Netherlands), also known by his pseudonym Lawrence Ray, is a Dutch presenter, producer and actor. He is best known for his stint as a VJ at MTV Europe, role as Sam in the show Extr@ (or more commonly known as Extra), and his role as Vico Maesland in the Dutch TV series Lotte.

== Biography ==
After high school, Oostveen studied International Management at the HEAO and attended an acting course at the Mountview Theatre School in London. He also attended several workshops in the field of media presentation and interview techniques, and he took part in the Leadership Development Program at Nyenrode Business University.

== Career ==
Oostveen gained international fame in 1996 when he was selected as a VJ by MTV during a working holiday at an Italian ski resort. From London, he presented a live program, Select MTV five days a week, where he interviewed prominent entertainers. His best show remains Mtv:new, a show which promoted avantgard alternative bands like Gorillaz and Linkin Park which were debuting at that time. He stayed with MTV Europe until 1999.

He then moved to London to be an actor, and performed in several stage productions, television series and films in England and Germany, including a 2001 Jeroen Krabbé-directed film adaptation of Mulisch's bestseller The Discovery of Heaven.

From 2002 to 2004 he appeared in the language education TV series Extr@. The series, which was scripted as a Friends-esque sitcom, was filmed in four different language versions; Oostveen appeared in three of them, the French, German and Spanish-language versions, for 13 episodes each, playing the same role in each, American tourist Sam Scott.

In 2006 he returned to the Netherlands. From 2006 to 2007 he had his highest-profile role, in the television series Lotte. The series aired five days each week; altogether, Oostveen appeared in over 200 episodes.

Before Lotte began in 2004, Oostveen was starting to produce a documentary for Discovery Channel of 700 candidates selected to participate in "Reel Race", a springboard for emerging talent.

Although Oostveen is still acting and leaving voice-overs, he focuses mainly on presenting and producing content-challenging projects for radio, television and online. He presented a radio program on city Amsterdam FM transmitter for broadcasting and the Salto report of Sail Amsterdam 2010. He also interviewed for the Election Omroepman / Woman of the Year for Broadcast Magazine heavyweights like Paul Witteman, Frits Barend, Erland Galjaard and Peter R. de Vries. In addition, Oostveen is attached as a producer to Eager Films, where he makes productions for major clients such as Exact and E.ON.

Oostveen speaks fluent Dutch, English, Spanish, German, French and Italian.
