= Sasha Saidin =

Malaysian singer and actress (born 1976)

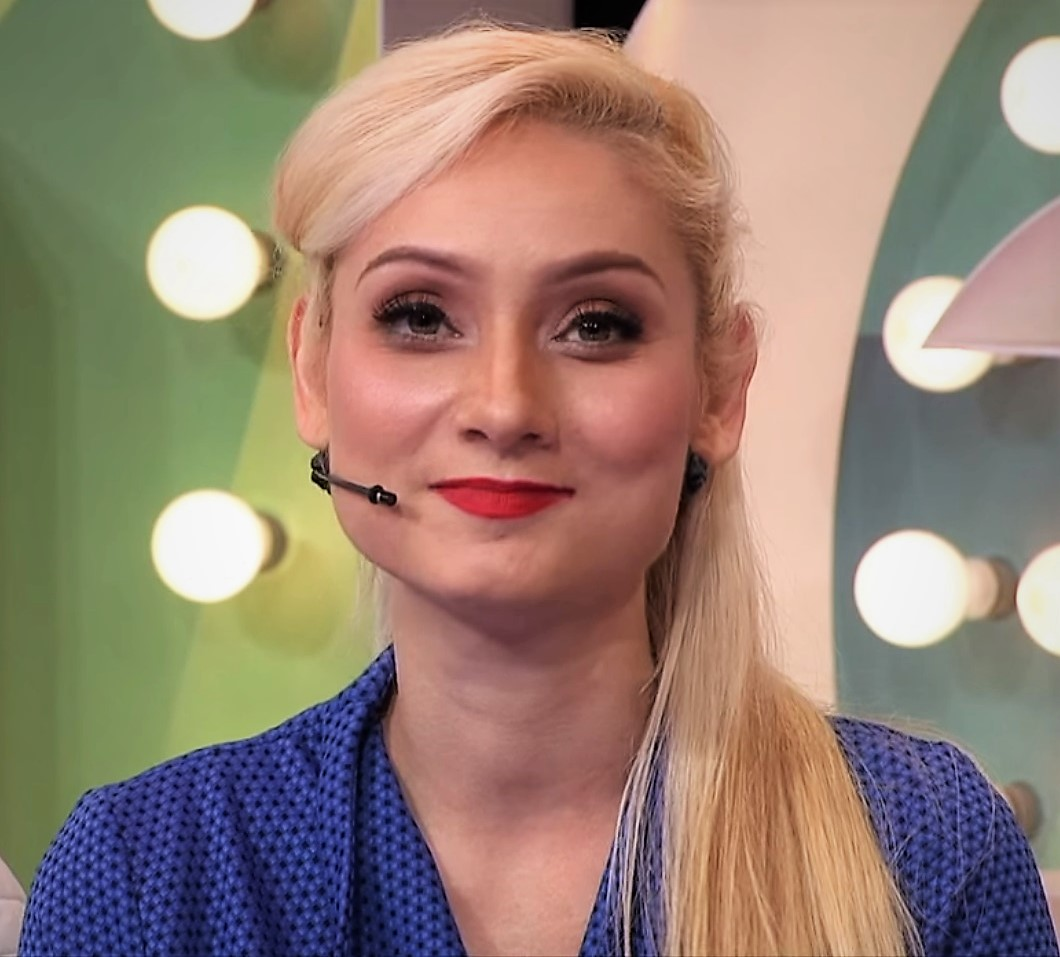
- Saidin on MeleTOP in 2015
- Born: Sasha binti Mohd Saidin; 20 December 1976 (age 49); London, England
- Occupations: Singer, actress
- Years active: 1996–2016
- Spouses: Jason Skinner (Johan Abdullah Skinner) (m. 2003; div. 2007) Salyo Priyanto Notosomarsono (m. 2007; div. 2012) Sirhan Wahab (after 2020)
- Children: Adam Aryasenna Notosomarsono
- Relatives: Zain Saidin (brother)

Sasha Mohd Saidin (born 20 December 1976) is a Malaysian singer and actress. She was formerly a member of the Malaysian pop group "Elite".

== Early life ==
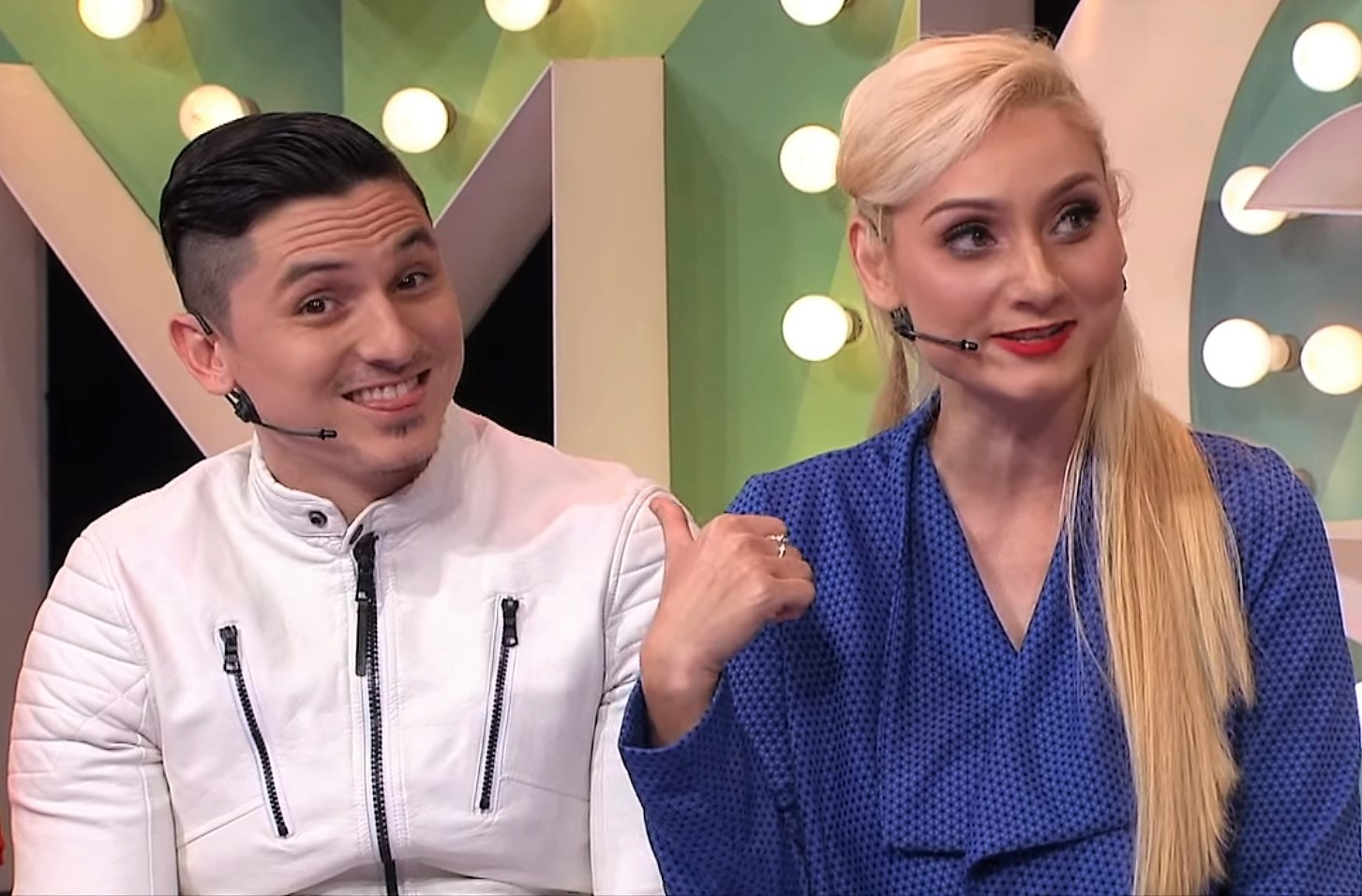
With younger brother Zain Saidin on MeleTOP in 2015

Sasha was born to an English-Italian mother, Siti Aisyah Abdullah and a Malaysian Malay father, Mohamad Saidin Osman. She has an older brother and a younger brother. She was educated at Bukit Bintang Girls' School. She graduated with a diploma in 2002 at KDU University College and a Bachelor of Business Information Systems from the University of East Anglia.

== Career ==
Sasha started modelling at the age of seven after being spotted by a modelling agency in a shopping complex. By thirteen, she started to model for fashion shoots and later, at seventeen, catwalk shows. In 1996, Sasha attended an open audition at the KRU Records in 1996, and was selected as one of the members of "Elite".

== Personal life ==
Sasha married to Jason Skinner (Johan Abdullah Skinner) in 2003. However, the couple divorced in 2007. She then married an Indonesian, Salyo Priyanto Notosoemarsono, giving birth to a son in 2010. The couple divorced in 2012.

In January 2020, Sasha married her school friend, Sirhan Wahab. The couple had known each other since secondary school. Sirhan has two children from his previous marriage.
