= Lydia Riezouw =

Dutch photographer, resistance fighter (1923–2005)

- Born: 4 October 1923; Amsterdam, Netherlands
- Died: 9 December 2005 (aged 82); Amsterdam, Netherlands
- Other names: Lydia Nobelen-Riezouw, Lydia van Nobelen-Riezouw
- Occupations: Photographer, nurse, resistance fighter

Lydia Riezouw (4 October 1923 – 9 December 2005), also known as Lydia van Nobelen-Riezouw, was a Dutch photographer and resistance fighter during World War II.

== Biography ==
Lydia Riezouw was born on 4 October 1923 in Amsterdam, Netherlands. She lived almost her life, including during the war, in her parents home at Plantage Kerklaan 9 in Amsterdam. She was not Jewish.

In 1942, Riezouw took five photographs from her room of the Jewish prisoners being held in the Hollandsche Schouwburg (English: Dutch Theatre or Hollandic Theatre), they were recently captured to be transported to concentration camps in Germany. The back garden of her parents home bordered the courtyard of the Hollandsche Schouwburg and in 1942, Riezouw saw her Jewish friend, Greetje Velleman, from the window of her house. The prisoners were allowed to get some fresh air outside and Riezouw photographs Velleman and the other people in the courtyard. She also plays records on the gramophone for them. Greetje is one of the first Jews to be imprisoned in the Hollandsche Schouwburg; and age seventeen Velleman was murdered in Auschwitz on 30 September 1942. Those photographs from 1942 by Riezouw were later shown at exhibitions worldwide, and are part of the collection at the NIOD Institute for War, Holocaust and Genocide Studies.

Lydia Riezouw died in 2005 at the Slotervaart Nursing Home in Amsterdam, where she lived the last years of her life. She was cremated in Amsterdam.

== Exhibitions ==
- 1996, "The Illegal Camera: Photography in the Netherlands During the German Occupation, 1940–1945", group exhibition, Jewish Museum, New York City, New York

== See also ==
- Women in World War II
