= Oh My English! =

Malaysian educational comedy television series

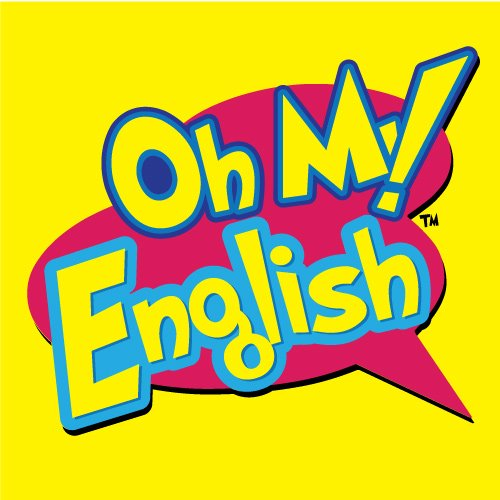
- Also known as: OME Season Titles: Oh My English! Class Of 2015 (Season 4); Oh My English! After School (Season 5); Oh My English! Level Up! (Season 6)
- Genre: Comedy, Educational, Teen Sitcom
- Directed by: Imri Nasution (Season 1-3) Umi Salwana Omar
- Starring: See below
- Theme music composer: Liyana Jasmay and Altimet
- Opening theme: Oh My English!
- Ending theme: Same as opening (Instrumental version)
- Country of origin: Malaysia
- Original languages: English; Malay (with either English or Malay subtitles)
- No. of seasons: 6
- No. of episodes: 122 (list of episodes)

Production
- Executive producer: Lina Tan
- Camera setup: multi-camera production
- Running time: 23–25 minutes (Seasons 1–5); 42 minutes (Season 2 Episode 20); 12 minutes (Season 6); 120 minutes (Telemovie)
- Production companies: Red Communication; Astro Entertainment

Original release
- Network: Astro TVIQ; Astro Mustika HD (Season 1 rerun in HD, Season 2 for all episodes); Astro Maya HD (Season 2 for telemovie and Season 3-6 for series & telemovies); Astro Prima; Astro Warna (Singapore only) Astro Ceria; Astro Tutor TV
- Release: May 20, 2012 – December 24, 2017

Oh My English! is a Malaysian educational comedy series which debuted on 20 May 2012, on Astro TVIQ. The series ended on 24 December 2017.

== Development ==
The TV series is a collaboration between Astro and the Malaysian Ministry of Education as part of an initiative to improve the pronunciation of English among Malaysians, in line with the ministry's "Upholding Bahasa Malaysia, Strengthening English" or (MBMMBI) policy. Astro worked with the ministry since 2009 to publish world-class learning programs to schools throughout Malaysia through its Corporate Social Responsibility (CSR), Kampus Astro. This project has also equipped 10,000 schools in Malaysia with flat-screen television equipment, Astro decoders and 17 education and information channels including History channel, Discovery, National Geographic, Astro Tutor TV, Astro TVIQ and others.

Since 2018, there has been no plans or announcements to continue the series. Reruns of the old and current six seasons and it's telemovie specials are still shown on selected Astro channels and is available to watch on Astro On Demand.

== Synopsis ==
=== Season 1 ===
A design school called SMK Ayer Dalam has a "3 Merah" class which is famous as a class that has a variety. No teacher wants to teach in this class because their students are known for their very naughty attitude, like to make noise and their worst academic results in the school. Their least favorite subject is English.

Finally, an English teacher named Henry Middleton (played by Zain Saidin) appeared. Henry's unique and encouraging way of teaching has been able to attract the attention and interest of students to learn English.

=== Season 2 ===
Mr. Middleton has changed his mind not to return to the UK. He continued his work in Class 3 Merah, and learned more about his 'new home' country.

=== Season 3 ===
Oh My English see you again with the 3rd season! This season students travel outside the school grounds, moving into the future, and the past as well as tours outside Ayer Dalam. On episode 22, OME brings a special guest there is The Miz

=== Season 4 - Class of 2015 ===
Class 5 Merah will face the SPM examination. The relationship between Mr. Middleton and Cikgu Ayu are increasingly threatened due to the presence of new teachers. Taylor Marie Smith from America has participated in the student exchange program to SMK Ayer Dalam.

=== Season 5 - After School ===
See Yew Soon has been kidnapped by a mysterious man who wants SYS to be his protégé. See Yew Soon needs help from Zack and Jibam. They are also accompanied by an A.I virtual watch that is Mia who often corrects their English.

=== Season 6 - Level Up! ===
Class 3 Merah will receive some new teachers. Among them, Mr. James Blond (Mark Odea) is a confused and unassuming person. At the same time, he tried to win the hearts of the students but his intentions were often misunderstood and caused harm to himself. Zack (Juzzthin) and Jojie (Nadiya Nisaa) returned to SMK Ayer Dalam but now they are teachers. Ms. Jojie teaches Physical Education (PE) and Mr. Zack teaches Music Education.

== Cast and characters ==
Character	Portrayed by	Season					
Character	Portrayed by	1	2	3	4	5	6
Zain Saidin	Henry Middleton	Main	Main	Main	Main		
Adibah Noor	Puan Hajar	Main	Main				Main
Harun Salim Bachik	Encik Mohd.Salleh	Main	Main				
Izara Aishah	Azlin	Main	Main				
Aedy Ashraf	Shafiq	Main	Main				
Roax Tan	See Yew Soon	Main	Main	Main	Main	Main	Recurring
Akhmal Nazri	Jibam	Main	Main	Main	Main	Main	
Nurul Ezlisa Loy	Faiza	Main					
Ahmad Ezzrin Loy	Faiz	Main					
Kaameshaa Ravindran	Anusha	Main	Main	Main	Main	Guest	
Amer Sharrif	Farouk	Main	Main				
Zhafir Muzani	Mazlee	Main	Main	Main	Main	Guest	
Mr.Os	Pak Sham	Main	Main				
Syafie Naswip	Azlan		Main				
Iezah Diyana	Hani		Main	Recurring			
Tiz Zaqyah	Cikgu Ayu		Main	Main	Main		
Aaron Aziz	Cikgu Malik		Main				
Nadiya Nisaa	Jojie			Main	Main		Main
Syafiq Kyle	Khai			Main			
Nazreen Juzzthin	Zack			Main	Main	Main	Main
Amyra Rosli	Putri			Main			
Carmen Soo	Miss Soo			Main	Main		Main
Fauziah Ahmad Daud	Puan Aida			Main	Main		
Rahim Sepahtu	Sarjan Bin Mejar			Main	Main		
Sherry Al-Hadad	Cikgu Bedah			Main	Main	Guest	Main
Juliana Evans	Taylor Marie Smith				Main	Guest	
Afeeq Emir	Zeeq				Main		
Chacha Maembong	Bella				Main		
Syamiem Alnisa	Qila				Main		
Azzam Sham	Sayur				Main		
Nazrief Nazri	Cikgu Ariff				Main		
Cristina Suzanne	Cikgu Nurul				Main		
Amelia Henderson	Amelia					Main	
Mark O'dea	Mr. James Blond						Main
Qistina Enara	Fiona						Main
Nur Shahidah	Mawar						Main
Fimie Don	Ronaldo						Main
Timothy Deeran Shegar	Muthusam / Sam						Main
Yuna Rahim	Amelia						Main
Faye An Ying Fei	See Mi Nau						Main
Harris Alif	Danial						Main
Izzy Zulkhazreef	Wan Yunus						Main
Sangeeta Krishnasamy	Cikgu Lakshmi						Main

== Episodes ==
Season	Episodes	Originally released	
Season	Episodes	First released	Last released
1	20	May 20, 2012	September 16, 2012
2	20	March 21, 2013	July 28, 2013
3	23	May 18, 2014	October 19, 2014
4	20	June 7, 2015	December 27, 2015
5	13	July 31, 2016	October 23, 2016
6	26	October 1, 2017	December 24, 2017
Telemovie	9	November 27, 2013	March 21, 2018

== Broadcast in Malaysia ==
Channel	Program
Astro TVIQ	Season 1-6 & Telemovies
Astro Mustika HD	Season 1 rerun in HD, Season 2 for all episodes
Astro Maya HD	Season 2 for telemovie and Season 3-6 for series & telemovies
Astro Prima	Season 1, 6 & Telemovie
Astro Ceria	Oh My Ganu only
Astro Tutor TV (ms)	Aired on 31 August 2020

== Awards and nominations ==
Year	Awards	Category	Nominated work	Result
2013	Anugerah Lawak Warna	Best Comedy Kids TV Series	Oh My English!	Won
2013	Astro On the Go Fan Choice Awards	Favourite Drama TV Show	Oh My English!	Nominated

== Other related activities ==
The cast of Oh My English!, along with the collaboration of Liyana Jasmay, Altimet and Sleeq, also created a music video, "Together" in late 2012.

Oh My English! was nominated for the 2015 International Digital Emmy Awards in the Children & Young People category.
