= De TV Competitie =

Dutch TV program

De TV Competitie (The TV Competition) was a Dutch week-long event broadcast by Talpa on 22-26 August 2005. This was preceded by an introductory program on 21 August presented by Jort Kelder, and followed by a final on 27 August. In it, five production companies submitted one pilot each for a potential program to air on Talpa, with the winner being determined by the viewers.

== Introductory program ==
The introductory program of De TV Competitie featured the producers and the ideas for their programs.

The five pilots, which were to be shown nightly at 8:30pm, were:

Day	Produced by	Title	Presenter	Description
22 August 2005	IdtV	Vijf sterren	Tatum Dagelet	Five former prostitutes want to abandon their job and open a café-restaurant together.
23 August 2005	René Stokvis Producties	Het grote geld	Chris Tates	For six months, three couples are followed 24 hours a day in search for high amounts of money.
24 August 2005	Eyeworks	Ik wil je een kind van jou... en verder niets	no presenter	working title: De Sperma(donoren)show; A woman picks among several men, selecting only one donor under the tagline "geen man, maar wel een kind" (no man, just one child).
25 August 2005	Endemol	Een goed begin	no presenter	Two people who don't know each other become brides.
25 August 2005	Palm Plus	Laatste kans voor de liefde	Minoesch Jorissen	A couple nearing divorce is followed by a mediator with the goal of restoring their relationship.

== Vijf Sterren ==
The first pilot shown was Vijf Sterren (Five Stars). In it, five prostitutes who don't know each other quit their job in prostitution and opened a café-restaurant together. The pilot was later adapted by EO.

== Het Grote Geld ==
Het Grote Geld (The Big Money) featured three couples who had to spend €100,000 in 180 days. The pilot was reportedly staged, one of the contestants, Kim, was actually cabaret artist Elske Rollema.

== Ik wil een kind van jou… en verder niets ==
Ik wil een kind van jou… en verder niets (I Want Your Child... and Nothing Else!) was the most controversial out of the five entries, receiving criticism from Dutch politicians before it was even broadcast. A 30-year old woman, Yessica, visited potential donors in order to find a suitable man. Afterwards, there would be artificial insemination. The pilot received massive international attention on the press, with some outlets believing it was a continuation of Big Brother.

== Een Goed Begin ==
Endemol's Een Goed Begin (A Good Beginning) was a dating show featuring arranged marriages. The marriage was recorded by the Endemol production team on 17 August in Alkmaar, while, days earlier, the participants became aware that it was a mere pilot.

== Laatste Kans voor de Liefde ==
The last pilot was Laatste Kans voor de Liefde (Last Chance for Love).

== Final and aftermath ==
The final was broadcast on 27 August. The winner of the format was Een Goed Begin, which enabled Endemol to produce a full season for Talpa, surpassing even the controversial sperm donor pilot, which had low ratings.

Vijf Sterren, one of the defeated pilots, was revived on 20 January 2006 on the same channel, under a new name: Uit het leven (In Life). One of the prostitutes was Erna, who did not appear in the August pilot, when, at the time, her parents didn't want to hear that she was involved in prostitution, as she lived in a small town. Actress Tatum Dagelet did not appear in its post-production.
