= Süskind (film) =

- Theatrical release poster
- Directed by: Rudolf van den Berg
- Written by: Chris W. Mitchell; Rudolf van den Berg
- Starring: Jeroen Spitzenberger; Karl Markovics; Nyncke Beekhuyzen; Katja Herbers
- Edited by: Job ter Burg
- Production companies: Fu Works; Cadenza Films; Rinkel Film
- Distributed by: Independent Films
- Release date: 19 January 2012
- Running time: 118 minutes
- Country: Netherlands
- Languages: Dutch; German
- Budget: €6 million

Süskind is a Dutch war film directed by Rudolf van den Berg. The film is based on the life of Walter Süskind and is set in Amsterdam during the Second World War. The film was released in the Netherlands on 19 January 2012.

== Plot ==
In Amsterdam during the German occupation of the Netherlands, a group of people, including Walter Süskind, try to help children escape the Holocaust.

== Cast ==
- Jeroen Spitzenberger as Walter Süskind
- Karl Markovics as Ferdinand aus der Fünten
- Nyncke Beekhuyzen as Hanna Süskind
- Katja Herbers as Fanny Philips
- Nasrdin Dchar as Felix Halverstadt
- Rudolf Lucieer as David Cohen
- Rob van de Meeberg as Abraham Asscher
- Peter Post (actor) as Albert Konrad Gemmeker
- Tygo Gernandt as Piet Meerburg

== Reception ==
Boyd van Hoeij of Variety magazine called it "a serious-minded, reined-in and slightly airless historical drama that also explores wartime behavior in shades of gray".
