= Tien (TV channel) =

Former Dutch cable TV channel

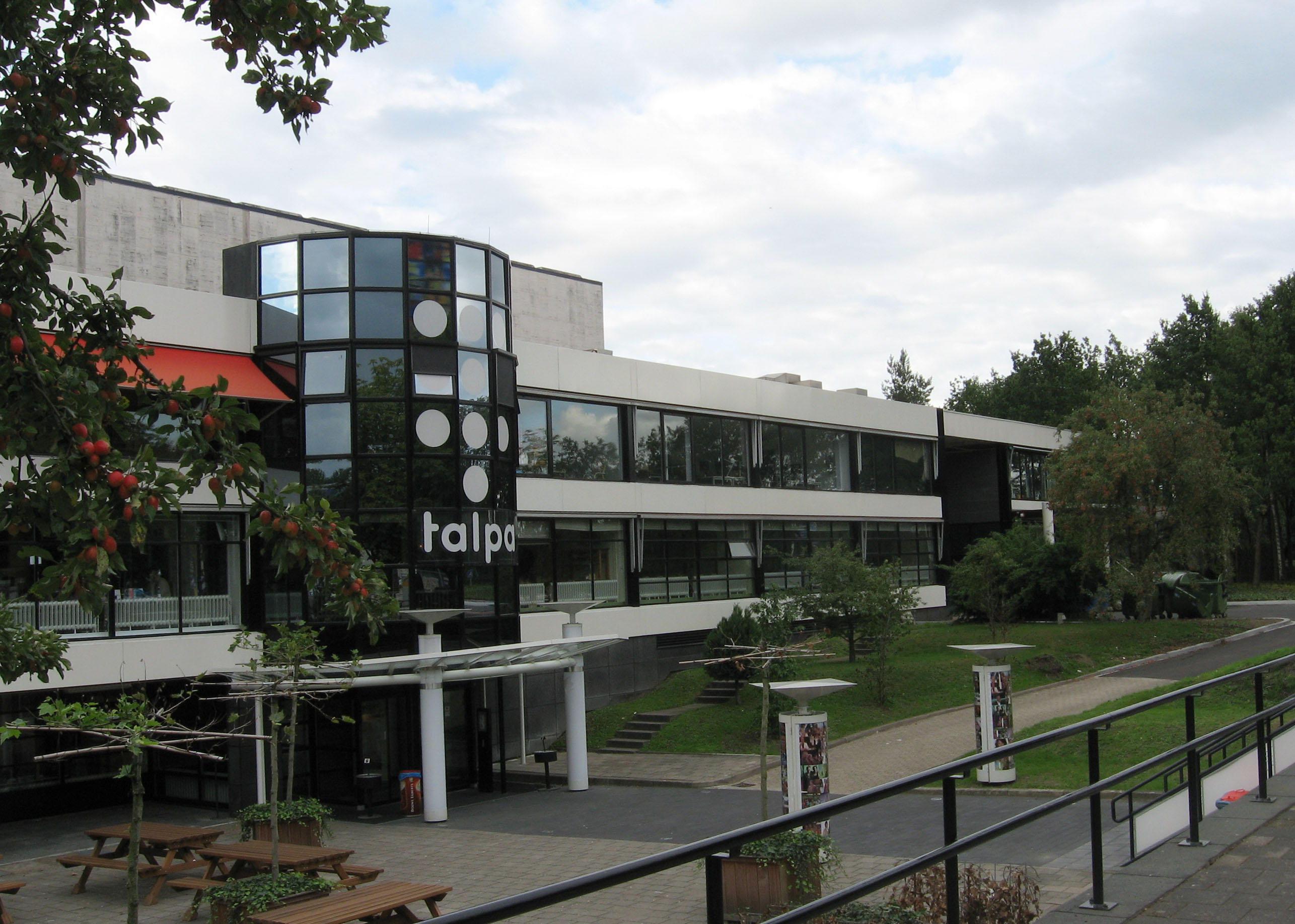
- Country: Netherlands
- Broadcast area: Hilversum, Netherlands
- Network: Talpa Holding
- Headquarters: Mediapark, Hilversum

Programming
- Picture format: SD 1080i
- Timeshift service: Talpa 2 (2006-2007)

Ownership
- Owner: Talpa Media (2005-2007, August 2007-present); RTL Nederland (July-August 2007)
- Sister channels: SBS 6, NET 5, Veronica (TV Channel)

History
- Launched: 13 August 2005; 21 years ago
- Closed: 17 August 2007; 19 years ago
- Replaced by: RTL 8 (2007-present)
- Former names: Talpa (2005-2006); Tien (2006-2007)

Links
- Website: www.Talpa.tv

Tien (meaning Ten in Dutch), previously known as Talpa, was the name of a commercial television channel in the Netherlands. Tien opened on 13 August 2005 as Talpa by Talpa Holding Company, following a name dispute with SBS Broadcasting. SBS Broadcasting owned the trademark "TV10" and objected to the use of the word Tien. The owner of Tien, Dutch media mogul John de Mol, decided to rebrand the channel as Talpa, the Latin word for "mole", which is mol in Dutch. Subsequently Talpa became the name of De Mol's holding company.

In the first months Talpa shared its channel space with Nickelodeon. On December 16, 2006, Nickelodeon switched to The Box and Tien started broadcasting full days.

On 16 December 2006, Talpa and SBS Broadcasting solved their dispute. Talpa was renamed as Tien.

In the summer of 2007, the assets of Talpa Media were sold to RTL Nederland, which meant the end of the Tien television channel. RTL Nederland used the vacated cable spot to launch a new television channel called RTL 8. Also included in the deal were the broadcasting rights for the Dutch football league and radio station Radio 538. Tien closed on 17 August 2007.

== History ==
John de Mol announced on 15 September 2004 that he would set up his own television channel, built on two key pillars: football and Dutch programming. The channel aimed to compete with the long-established commercial channels RTL 4 and SBS6. He had previously attempted the creation of a television channel, Sport 7, in 1996. The new channel announced an agreement with Nickelodeon to use its channel capacity after 6pm. The new channel was set to launch around August 2005.

The first tests were conducted with the package of Dutch team qualifiers for the upcoming 2006 FIFA World Cup, to be broadcast under the Nickelodeon brand until the new channel was created. The first match on 9 October was against Macedonia, for which John de Mol sent trucks containing state-of-the-art equipment to Skopje (de Mol said that the Macedonian equipment was at pre-1990s levels, with a video mixer dated from 1975, and that, with all that equipment, it would look like a match from 1978), estimated to be worth €900,000. Talpa acquired the rights to the package and also negotiated with KPN for internet streaming.

On 12 January 2005, de Mol appointed former Endemol CEO Ronald Goes as CEO of Talpa Media Holdings, and was appointed director-general of the new channel, under the working title TVNL.

On 20 April 2005, Talpa announced that the name of the new channel was going to be Tien (Ten). The logo was selected out of 30,000 entries (yet there were 23 instances of "Tien"). The winning application was from 24-year old Koen Janse. The T mark represented both its superior quality and Talpa, and insisted that the channel didn't claim channel 10. On the same day, SBS Broadcasting Group took the naming decision to the court, under the grounds that its name resembled TV10 - a trademark it held for several years - which SBS planned to use for a new digital channel with a tentative 1 September launch date. As consequence, it had to use the Talpa name from its parent company. Several staff members, including NET5's director of programming Remco Van Waterloo, had moved to Talpa. On 18 June 2005, IKON aired an interview with omroep director Paul Rösenmoller to John de Mol in his second residence in Portugal. In the interview, he suggested the usage of Tien for a possible second channel.

The channel opened on 13 August 2005, attracting an audience of 1,053,000 viewers, led by Beau van Erven Dorens and Linda de Mol. The opening night was comparable to TROS according to Maarten Reesink of the University of Amsterdam and TROS president Karel van Doodewaerd.John de Mol announced the early start of the channel due to the start of the Eredivisie season, but due to the pressure of starting weeks in advance, with repeats and even other sports competitions temporarily filling in slots. Its sports magazine with Eredivisie highlights attracted 1,170,000 viewers on the first night, ascending to 2,045,000 on the second night. John de Mol never imagined having his network lead the ratings on its first weekend on air, not even "in [his] wildest dreams".

More than one week after opening, on 24 August 2005, the channel made international headlines due to its sperm donor reality show, Ik wil je een kind van jou... en verder niets (I Want Your Child... and Nothing Else!). The pilot had received harsh criticism from Dutch politicians days before its airing, being referred as a "sperm show". It aired as part of a week-long event (De TV Competitie) in which the most-watched out of the five reality show pilots would eventually be greenlit to a full season. The previous day's pilot, Het Grote Geld (The Big Money), also received controversy due to discrepancies between the jury and its production company Stokvis Productions under the grounds of supposedly being staged. The channel also aired the fifth version of the Dutch Big Brother, which the company bought the rights in April with the new channel in mind.

In September, Talpa showed its interest for buying one of SBS's three channels, easing its plans for a second channel. Negotiations with SBS would ease the process and it was expected that the translation would be concluded in November. Low ratings on 11 October led to the end of Thuis effective 28 October, after 55 editions.

In April 2006, Talpa's news service, NSE Nieuws, was cancelled.

On 16 November 2006, it was announced that Talpa would become Tien from 16 December 2006, coinciding with its conversion into a 24-hour channel. Its former slot as a timeshare with Nickelodeon was given to The Box.

Rumors emerged in March 2007 that RTL Nederland was set to acquire the channel. It had never achieved the 10% mark, averaging around 6% of share. In May, it was announced that the channel would be part of RTL from 1 August. Already under RTL's ownership, the channel's final broadcast was held on 21 September 2007. The channel closed down with De Laatste Show, a retrospective of its two years on air. The following day, RTL 8 took over.

== Programmes ==
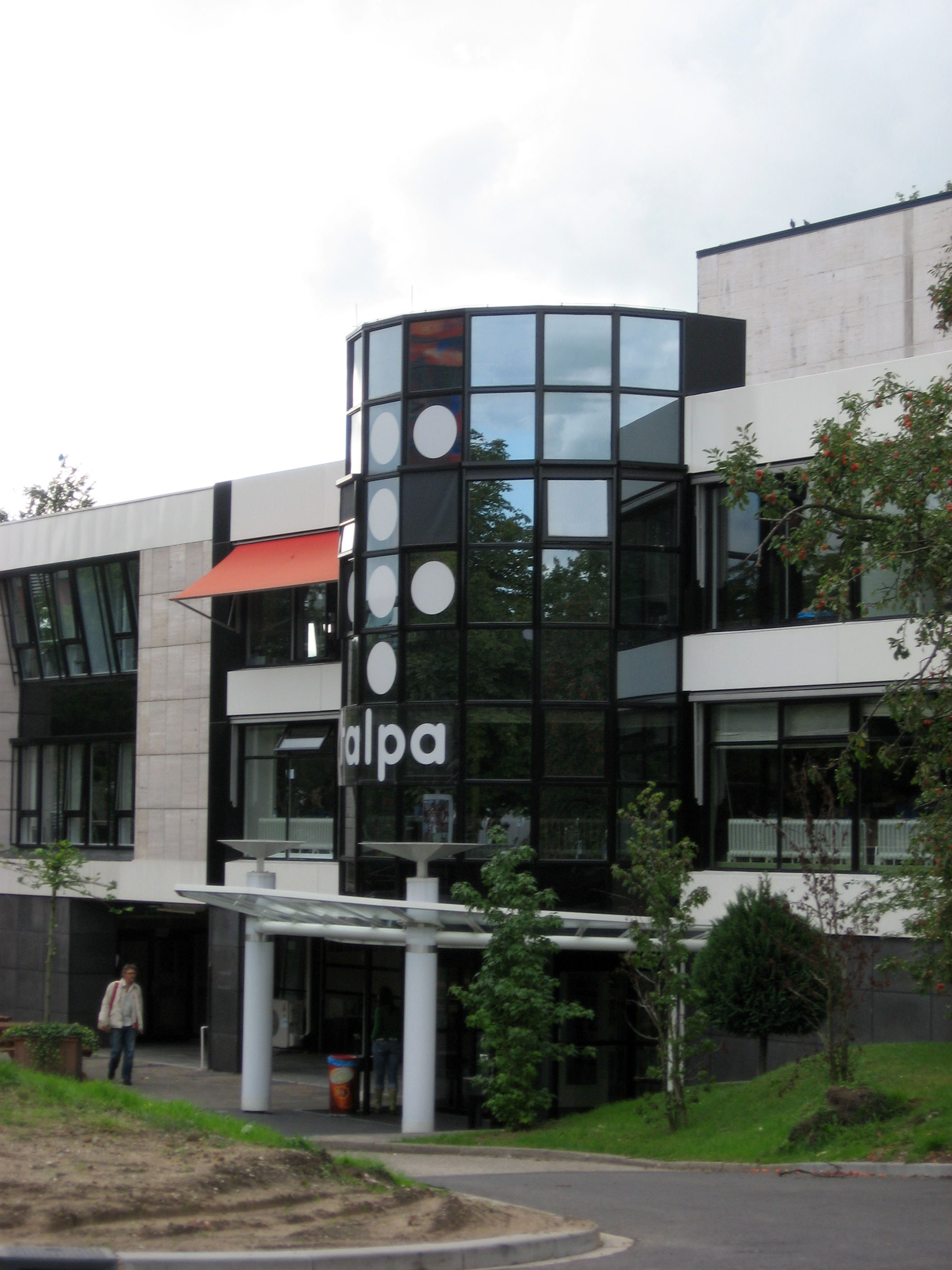
Talpa/Tien headquarters (then Talpa) in Hilversum, Netherlands.

Programmes included 'De Wedstrijden' (highlights of the Eredivisie football league), Big Brother and Expeditie Robinson. Tien is also noted for programming original Dutch drama, such as Gooische Vrouwen, Lotte, Van Speijk, Boks, Voetbalvrouwen and the daily comedy show Samen. Van Speijk, a highly publicized police series, attracted an average amount of 900,000 viewers weekly. Season one of "Gooische Vrouwen" attracted more than a million viewers each episode. Samen was the world's first daily comedy show.

== Programming & ratings ==
From the beginning, the channel struggled with disappointing ratings. Expectations were high, because Talpa owned the rights to summaries of matches played in the Eredivisie, the Dutch top-flight football league. The live broadcasting rights were owned by Versatel, another De Mol venture.

In the beginning, football programme De Wedstrijden scored disappointing ratings. Although by far the most-watched programme on Talpa, De Wedstrijden failed to attract the audience that NOS programme Studio Sport used to have. Dutch celebrities like Ivo Niehe and Henny Huisman also failed to attract their former audiences on Talpa. Niehe returned to his former employer TROS in January 2007. Niehe was also one of the most outspoken critics on the failure of the station in general. Huisman already left for EO after his unsuccessful stint with Talpa.

With Jack Spijkerman Talpa thought to have a guaranteed ratings hit, but his audience at Talpa was just one quarter of his former ratings at VARA. The football discussion program Spijkerman hosted with Humberto Tan was also unsuccessful and eventually axed.

Not all programmes flopped on Talpa. The controversial show Joling & Gordon over de Vloer (Joling and Gordon about the house, hosted by openly gay singers Gordon Heuckeroth and Gerard Joling) scored 1.2 million viewers. Other major hits were comedy drama series Gooische Vrouwen (Women from 't Gooi, 1.6 million viewers) and Voetbalvrouwen, the Dutch version of Footballers' Wives (1.4 million viewers). Expeditie Robinson, Miljoenenjacht and Postcodeloterij Miljoenenjacht (1.5 million viewers) and 1 vs. 100 were also among the reasonably scoring shows, albeit with much smaller audiences than at the former broadcaster.

== See also ==
- Television networks in the Netherlands
