= Betty Goudsmit-Oudkerk =

Dutch resistance member (1924–2020)

- Betty Goudsmit-Oudkerk in 1943
- Born: 2 April 1924; Amsterdam, Netherlands
- Died: 14 June 2020 (aged 96); Amsterdam, Netherlands
- Occupation: resistance figure
- Awards: B'nai B'rith-certificate Jewish Rescuers Citation

Betty Goudsmit-Oudkerk (2 April 1924 – 14 June 2020) was a Dutch resistance member.

Oudkerk was the last living staff member of the illustrious nursery opposite the Hollandsche Schouwburg located at the Plantage Middenlaan in Amsterdam. There, during World War II, the personnel saved many Jewish children; Goudsmit-Oudkerk was 17 years old at that time. She didn't talk about it, but due to the insistence of her children, she had her story written down in 2016 in the book Betty, een Joods kinderverzorgster in verzet (literally translated: Betty, a Jewish childcare worker in resistance). Goudsmit-Oudkerk explained how Jewish parents were at the Hollandsche Schouwburg before they were deported. The Germans did not want to be disturbed by the sound of children, so they were brought to Betty and her colleagues, who saved around 600 children. The first copy of her book was handed over to Eberhard van der Laan, then mayor of Amsterdam in 2016. The same year, Goudsmit-Oudkerk received a B'nai B'rith-certificate. This international award, entitled "Jews Rescued Jews", is awarded to Jewish resistance heroes during the Holocaust. Betty was present at many meetings in the Joods Cultureel Kwartier, at the opening of the National Holocaust Museum, and at lectures and commemorations in the Hollandsche Schouwburg. In 2019 Betty Goudsmit-Oudkerk laid a wreath during the Remembrance of the Dead at Dam Square.

She was born in Amsterdam, the daughter of Henriette Hamburger-Monnickendam and Leendert Oudkerk. During the war, Goudsmit-Oudkerk lost her mother, grandmother and two brothers. After the war she married Bram Goudsmit and had five children with him. Goudsmit-Oudkerk died on 14 June 2020, aged 96.
