= Nyncke Beekhuyzen =

Dutch actress (born 1980)

Nyncke Beekhuyzen (born 24 January 1980 in Amsterdam) is a Dutch actress.

Beekhuyzen was trained at the Amsterdamse Toneelschool & Kleinkunstacademie. In 2003, Beekhuyzen joined the medical television series IC, as Linda Ramirez. She made guest appearances on Spoorloos Verdwenen, Sprint!, Het Woeden der Gehele Wereld, and Gebroken Rood.

Beekhuyzen has starred as Lotte Pronk since 2006, in a series called Lotte. The series is based on Yo Soy Betty La Fea, a Colombian telenovela. She also played a role in the Dutch film Süskind.
