= Lotte (TV series) =

Dutch television series

Lotte is a Dutch telenovela television series. The series was broadcast by the commercial station Tien, upon which it was shown every weekday at 6:30 pm.

The series is based on the Colombian telenovela Yo soy Betty, la fea and centres on the protagonist, Lotte Pronk, a business economics graduate who passed with honours and has trouble finding a job until she comes across a secretary job in an international fashion company called "Emoda", where at the same time a conflict is occurring in the business between two prospective CEOs.

She begins the series mocked by many of her colleagues for being "ugly", and as the series progresses she develops confidence, moves up the ladder and explores romantic interests. The series also features on the fellow Emoda employees, and their relationships and career problems.

Lotte is written by a team of writers led by Marciel Witteman, also known for the Dutch soap opera Goudkust, and scripts for the drama series Westenwind. The series was directed by Vincent Schuurman and Manin de Wilt.

Lotte is the first Dutch telenovela which in its original form was to consist of 200 episodes. On 11 December 2006, Tien officially announced that the series would get 35 extra episodes. Marciel Witteman wanted the extra episodes to round off the storylines of some of the characters. In the final episode all the characters were present.

On 9 April 2007, Lotte ended its run on Tien with its finale.

== Ratings ==
An average of between 250,000 and 300,000 people tuned in for each episode.

== Cast ==
Character	Actor/Actress	Featured in
Lotte Pronk	Nyncke Beekhuyzen	All episodes
Vico Maesland	Lars Oostveen	All episodes
Robert Maesland	Filip Bolluyt	All episodes
Daniel Valkenburg	Arent-Jan Linde	Until episode 200
Marcella Valkenburg	Janna Fassaert	Until episode 200
Mark Cremers	Geert Hoes	All episodes
Niek Mulder	Marc Nochem	All episodes
José Pronk	Lieneke le Roux	All episodes
Herman Pronk	Dries Smits	Until episode 200
Hugo Lombardi	Dirk Zeelenberg	Until episode 200
Patricia Frijling	Ilse Heus	All episodes
Mara Fontein	Marlous Dirks	All episodes
Marianne Santos	Sonja Silva	All episodes
Bianca Geurts	Anne-Marie Jung	All episodes
Sofia Rombouts	Nartan Meerlo	All episodes
Rolph Ypema	Oren Schrijver	From episode 201
Scarlett Zwaan	Mimi Ferrer	From episode 201
Alex van Weerden	Edwin Jonker	From episode 201
Dieudonnee	Vreneli van Helbergen	From episode 222
