= Extra (franchise) =

extra
- Also known as: extr@
- Created by: Channel 4 Learning
- Country of origin: United Kingdom
- No. of episodes: 30 (English); 13 (French, Spanish, German)

Production
- Executive producer: Andrew Bethell
- Running time: 24 minutes

Original release
- Network: Channel 4 (UK) multiple PBS member station/network instructional television blocks (U.S.)
- Release: 2002 – 2004

extra (stylized as extr@) is a language education television programme franchise that was scripted in the format of a Friends-esque sitcom. It was in production from 2002 to 2004, and is mainly marketed to the instructional television market for middle school and high school language classes. Four versions were made, each in a different language; English, French, German, and Spanish.

The English version was co-produced by Channel 4 Learning and RAI CPTO (Production Centre of Turin) for RAI Educational. All of the episodes were written by Louise Clover.

== Plot ==
The English version has 30 episodes, and the other three languages have 13 episodes each. The plot of the 13 episodes is nearly the same in all the language variants.

Hector/Sam, with only a very basic grasp of the featured language, comes to stay with his pen pal, Bridget/Sacha/Sascha/Lola. Living with Bridget/Sacha/Sascha/Lola is roommate Anna/Annie/Ana. Sleazy and sly neighbor Nick/Nico/Nic/Pablo lives across the hallway. Hector's/Sam's efforts to get to grips with the language provide the dynamic for the series' language learning content. The series is particularly suitable for adolescents and young adults who can relate to the contextual setting and implied meanings in the screenplay. The series ended with Sam and Annie's wedding being canceled, ending with a cliff-hanger; however, the English version had 17 more episodes which provides a better understanding of the character, continuing with Nico and Sacha beginning to date and facing problems, and Sam and Annie wanting to break up. In the end, Sam was offered a job opportunity in the U.S as a producer. The 30th episode, Love hurts, ended with Sam questioning "Should I go?", and there were no more episodes produced, hinting at Sam's departure. Thus the plot begins and ends with Sam.

== Cast ==
English	French	German	Spanish
Javier Marzan - Hector Romero	Lawrence Ray - Sam Scott		
Julie Buckfield – Annie Taylor	Marie Cordillot – Annie	Britta Becker – Anna Schmidt	Celia Meiras – Ana
Abby Simpson – Bridget Evans	Vanessa Seydoux – Sacha Fontaine	Leontine Hass – Sascha Meier/Fontane (Note: In the German version, Sascha's surname is given as Meier in episode 4, but as Fontane in episode 13)	Vanessa Otero – Lola Cano
Toby Walton – Nick Jessop	Jean-Felix Callens – Nico Dubois	Frank Brunet – Nic Müller	Javier Marzan – Pablo Aranda García

== Episodes ==
Episode	English	French	German	Spanish
1	"Hector's Arrival"	"L'arrivée de Sam"	"Sams Ankunft"	"La llegada de Sam"
2	"Hector Goes Shopping"	"Sam fait du shopping"	"Sam geht einkaufen"	"Sam va de compras"
3	"Hector Has a Date"	"Sam a un rendez-vous"	"Sam hat ein Date"	"Sam aprende a ligar"
4	"Hector Looks for a Job"	"Sam trouve du travail"	"Sam sucht einen Job"	"Sam busca un trabajo"
5	"A Star Is Born"	"Une étoile est née"	"Ein Star ist geboren"	"Ha nacido una estrella"
6	"Bridget Wins the Lottery"	"Le jour du loto"	"Lotto-Tag"	"El día de la Primitiva"
7	"The Twin"	"La jumelle"	"Der Zwilling"	"La gemela"
8	"The Landlady's Cousin"	"La cousine de la concierge"	"Die Kusine der Vermieterin"	"La prima de la dueña"
9	"Jobs for the Boys"	"Du boulot pour Sam et Nico"	"Jobs für Nic und Sam"	"Trabajos para los chicos"
10	"Annie's Protest"	"Annie proteste"	"Anna demonstriert"	"Ana protesta"
11	"Holiday Time"	"Les vacances"	"Ferienzeit"	"Tiempo de vacaciones"
12	"Football Crazy"	"Fou de foot"	"Verrückt nach Fußball"	"Fanáticos del fútbol"
13	"A Wedding in the Air"	"Un mariage dans l'air"	"Hochzeitspläne"	"Boda en el aire"
14	"Changes"			
15	"The Bouncer"			
16	"Uncle Nick"			
17	"Cyber Stress"			
18	"Just the Ticket"			
19	"Kung Fu Fighting"			
20	"Every Dog has its Day"			
21	"The Entertainers"			
22	"Haunting at Halloween"			
23	"Truth or Dare"			
24	"Pilot Nick"			
25	"Art"			
26	"Alibi"			
27	"Can You Live Without ...?"			
28	"Christmas"			
29	"Camping"			
30	"Love Hurts"			

The episode descriptions are based on the English version. The plots are almost the same in the language versions. Word play, as with any internationalization, is usually untranslatable and involves slight differences.

=== Episode 1 ===
Bridget (Sacha, Sascha, Lola) shares a flat in London (Paris, Berlin, Barcelona) with her friend Annie (Anna, Ana). She receives a letter from her former pen pal Hector from Argentina (Sam from America) announcing his visit. When he actually appears, his knowledge of the English (French, German, Spanish) language turns out to be very poor. This leads to the misunderstanding that he is supposedly playing with toy cars and living in a museum. He also wears old-fashioned clothes. The girls are annoyed by this and wonder whether they should accommodate him. They suggest to Nick (Nico, Pablo), a neighbor who now appears, that he should teach Hector English (French, German, Spanish) lessons while they go grocery shopping.

Jealous Nick slyly teaches Hector words with which he later unsuspectingly annoy Annie. He also encourages Hector to prove his fitness on Bridget's exercise bike, even though he knows that she doesn't tolerate strangers on it. As this makes Hector sweat, he goes to take a shower. The returning girls have had enough and want to throw Hector out. When Hector comes out of the shower dressed only in a towel, they are fascinated by his body and are speechless.

Suddenly Nick pushes Hector back into the bathroom and closes the door. He has found a portrait of Hector and his rich family in a magazine. After Hector confesses to him that he is looking for true friends, they both decide not to tell the girls about it. In the meantime, the girls have changed their minds and ensnare Hector. It also turns out that Hector's bad impression was due to Nick's machinations. Since today is also a holiday, they have a small party.

=== Episode 2 ===
Bridget, Annie and Nick are upset about Hector's old-fashioned style of dress and want to give him a new outfit. However, their ideas about the new style diverge greatly. Nick wants a biker, Annie a cowboy and Bridget wants a trendy style. Each of the three buys a piece for Hector. When they get home, they realise that they don't match. After the three practise shopping with Hector in the local language, he goes off himself and, amazingly, returns shortly afterwards in a fashionable outfit.

While they were away, Hector had found a shopping list and ordered the goods on it online. Bridget, Nick and Annie now realise that he ordered one item incorrectly and bought 12 dozen instead of 12 eggs. Finally, the landlady complains that there are 400 tins of dog food in the entrance to the house. Immediately it becomes clear who screwed this up.

=== Episode 3 ===
Annie is dominated by Bridget in her search for a partner. So she tries to post a personal ad on the internet, but only gets three completely bizarre responses. Nick, the braggart, boasts that he can easily find girls on the internet.

Bridget gives Hector gymnastics lessons, then takes Annie to the gym. Before that, she tasks the boys with doing the laundry and watering a plant.

Hector tells Nick that he has never had a girlfriend. The latter then places a dating ad on the internet claiming that they are both millionaires, when in fact this is only true of Hector. Meanwhile, Hector sprays the plant with perfume instead of watering it and puts his red T-shirt inside the white underwear, which has to be washed very hot.

After the boys leave the flat, they receive 633 responses to the advertisement. This is what the girls, who are now returning home, discover. They also find the faded and perfumed plant, the empty perfume bottle and the white underwear stained red by the T-shirt. They plot revenge and delete the 633 mails. Then they go to the cybercafe to invite the boys on a date with two dancers.

The returning boys are disappointed to have received only one reply. However, they are pleased that they are dancers and prepare for the date. In the process, Nick practices with Hector how to give compliments. When there is a knock at the door at the agreed time, two girls dressed as dogs are standing there. At first they pretend to be dancers in a dog musical. Nick insists that they are millionaires. Bridget and Annie now reveal themselves and think that the "millionaires" could pay for the withered plant and the underwear.
