= Bukit Bintang Girls' School =

Bukit Bintang Girls' School (BBGS)

Location
- Kuala Lumpur; Malaysia; 3.1490°N 101.7128°E

Information
- Type: All-girls secondary school
- Motto: Latin: Nisi Dominus Frustra (Without God, All is in vain)
- Religious affiliation: Christian
- Denomination: The Brethren Church
- Established: 1893
- Founder: Miss Betty Langlands (and British missionaries)
- Status: Closed
- Closed: 2000
- Grades: Form 1 – Form 5
- Gender: Female
- Campus: Formerly in Bukit Bintang
- Colours: Green and white
- Affiliations: Malaysia Ministry Of Education
- Abbreviation: BBGS
- Website: bbgs.com.my

Bukit Bintang Girls' School (abbreviated BBGS) established in 1893 with Miss Betty Langlands teaching girls to read in Brickfields, Kuala Lumpur, Malaysia. Formerly known as the Chinese Girls' School, BBGS gained its name after moving to its premises on Bukit Bintang Road in 1930. BBGS was the oldest school in Kuala Lumpur, surpassing Victoria Institution and Methodist Girls' School Kuala Lumpur (1896), Methodist Boys' School Kuala Lumpur (1897), Convent Bukit Nanas (1899) and as well St. John's Institution, Kuala Lumpur.

In 2000, the school changed its name to Sekolah Menengah Kebangsaan Seri Bintang Utara (SBU). It was moved to a new location at Taman Shamelin Perkasa, Cheras and was established as one of the first Smart Schools in Malaysia. The BBGS landmark on Bukit Bintang Road was demolished to build Pavilion KL, a commercial site in Kuala Lumpur.

== School song ==
The school song is adapted from a hymn (Presbyterian Hymnal) entitled "Land of Our Birth" after the Second World War. In 1989, Miss Yeo Kim Eng, a former student and teacher of Bukit Bintang Girl School, translated the lyrics into the country's national language, Bahasa Melayu.

== Sport houses ==
The school consists of five sports houses. The sports houses compete against each other on sports day. The houses are named after the headmistresses of BBGS.

- Blue - Maclay
- Yellow - Cooke
- Purple - Prouse
- Green - Green
- Red - Shirtliff

== Notable alumni ==
- Sasha Saidin, singer
- Poesy Liang, founder of Helping Angels, survivor of spinal tumours, designer, writer, artist, Her World Woman Of The Year 2011.
- Fong Foong Mei, Pulitzer Prize-winning journalist.
- Yasmin Yusuff, former Miss Malaysia, celebrity DJ and Host.
- Shayna Zaid, New York-based singer/songwriter and recording artist.
- Juwita Suwito, singer, recording artiste.
- Suridah Jalaluddin, CEO of NTV7.
- Carolyn Au Yong, Commonwealth Games Gold Medalist Gymnast.
- Ras Adiba, Ras Adiba, TV celebrity presenter
- Amber Leong, entrepreneur, first Malaysian on the America's reality TV show, Shark Tank.
- Wong Ming Yang, doctor, late wife of Singapore Prime Minister Lee Hsien Loong
