= Otto van Verschuer =

Dutch politician

Otto baron van Verschuer
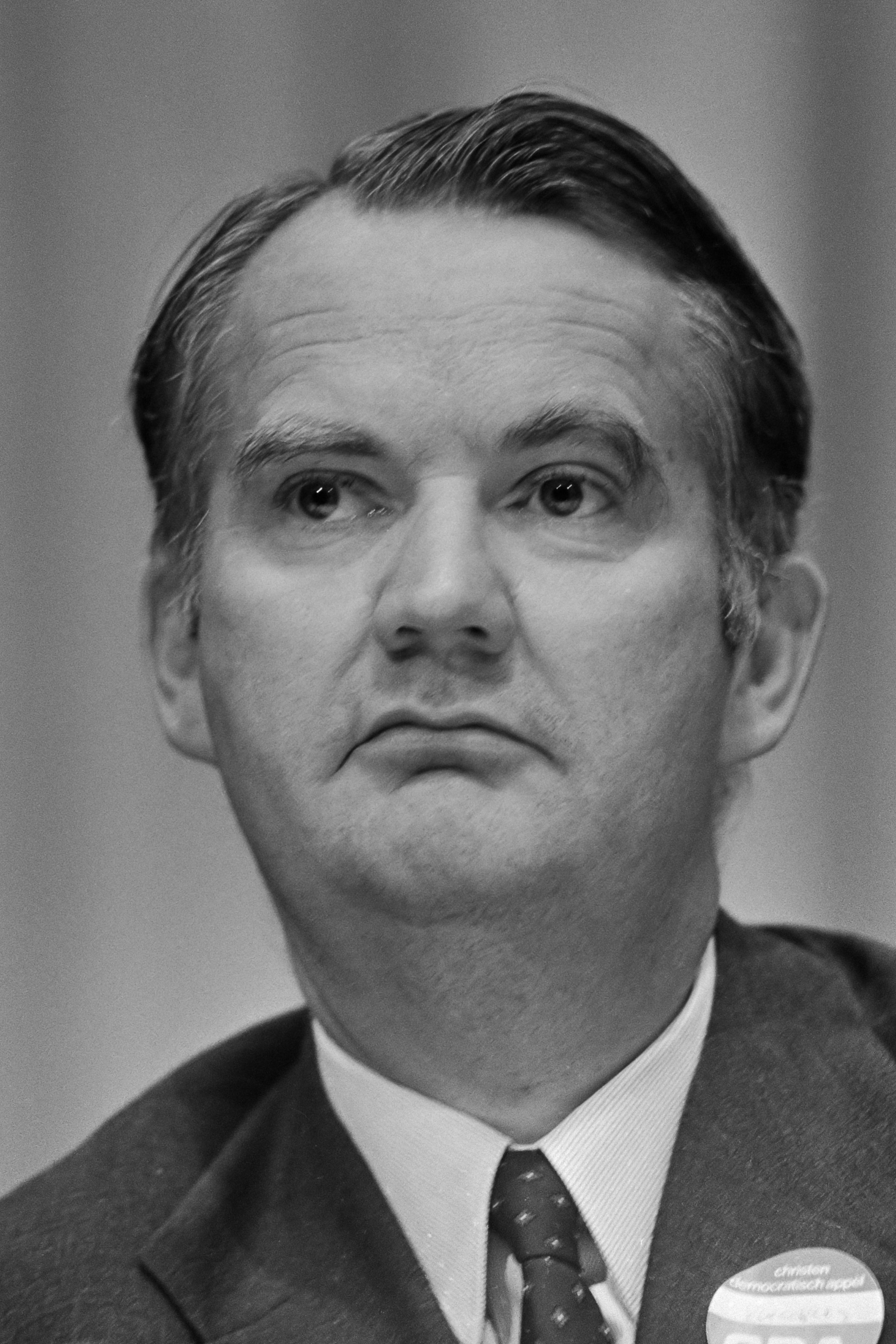
- Otto baron van Verschuer in 1975

Member of the States of Gelderland
- In office 6 June 1962 – 7 June 1978

Member of the Provincial-Executive of Gelderland
- In office 1 March 1965 – 7 June 1978

(Acting) Mayor of Wageningen
- In office 1 September 1978 – 1 April 1979

Extraordinary member of the Council of State
- In office 1 October 1978 – 25 April 1979

Member of the Council of State
- In office 25 April 1979 – 1 June 1983

Personal details
- Born: 22 July 1927 Beesd, Netherlands
- Died: 4 June 2014 (aged 86) Beesd, Netherlands
- Party: Christian Historical Union (until 1980), Christian Democratic Appeal (from 1980)

Otto Willem Arnold baron van Verschuer, lord of Mariënwaerdt, Echteld and Enspijk (22 July 1927 – 4 June 2014) was a Dutch politician. He served in the States of Gelderland between 1962 and 1978, while being part of the Executive of the same province from 1965. Verschuer was member of the Dutch Council of State between 1978 and 1983.

== Biography ==
Otto van Verschuer was born on 22 July 1927 in home Hooge Spijk at family estate Mariënwaerdt, in Beesd, to Wolter Frans Frederik, baron van Verschuer and Willemine Louisa Maria, baroness van Heemstra. He went to high school in Arnhem and went on to study Indisch law (law of the Dutch East Indies) at Utrecht University, graduating in 1953.

He was rentmeester of the crown domains of Culemborg-Tiel-Grave-Arnhem between 1958 and 1971. He entered the States of Gelderland for the Christian Historical Union on 6 June 1962. From 1 March 1965 he concurrently was member of the Provincial-Executive, tasked with spatial planning and agriculture. He left his provincial positions on 7 June 1978.

Several months later, in September 1978, he became acting mayor of Wageningen, after the previous mayor had died. Verschuer was extraordinary member of the Council of State between 1 October 1978 and 25 April 1979. On that latter date he was made a regular member, and continued serving until 1 June 1983. In January 1979 he was offered membership of the Dutch Senate but declined.

Apart from his political career Verschuer served as chair of the Royal Dutch Touring Club between 1988 and 1995. He also spent a large part of his time of his time conserving the family estate Mariënwaerdt in Beesd. His father had already told him he was to be successor to the estate at age 10.

He was made Knight of the Order of the Netherlands Lion in 1978 and Commander of the Order of Orange-Nassau in 1993. Verschuer served as chamberlain to Queen Beatrix of the Netherlands for a long time. He also received an honorary cross of the Order of the House of Orange.

He died on 4 June 2014. He was buried in the family grave on the estate Mariënwaerdt in Beesd. Dignitaries at his burial included former prime minister Jan Peter Balkenende and Herman Wijffels.
