= Channel 4 Learning =

Educational company part of Channel 4

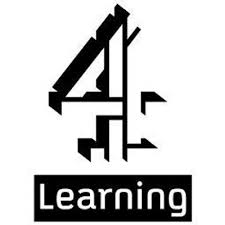
- Type: Private/Limited
- Industry: Publishing
- Genre: Education
- Founded: April 2007
- Headquarters: London, United Kingdom
- Area served: United Kingdom
- Products: Web content, DVD and CD-ROM
- Owner: Espresso Group Ltd.
- Website: channel4learning.com (archived 2019)

Channel 4 Learning is an educational company based in London, England. The company markets education resources, games and activities to primary and secondary schools across the United Kingdom. It is wholly owned by Espresso Group Ltd.

== History ==
Channel 4 Learning, originally part of Channel 4, was created to produce support materials that motivate and inspire learners aged 4–19 while empowering teachers to create engaging lessons.

Primary resources cover Early Years, Key Stage 1 and Key Stage 2. Secondary resources cover Key Stage 3, Key Stage 4 and GCSEs.

In October 2007, Channel 4 launched Learning Clipbank, an online service specifically for secondary schools in the UK, providing video clips across 16 subject areas with tools to assist teachers and students in using the content. While most of the video was originally sourced from Channel 4 television programmes, it has since been supplemented with content from ITN and BBC Motion Gallery.

Channel 4 Learning also has an International division that license and distributes the rights to over 320 hours of educational programming, commissioned by Channel 4, into more than 40 countries worldwide.

After the re-structuring of Channel 4 in 1993, ITV's obligations to provide educational programming on Channel 4's airtime passed to Channel 4 itself, and the new service became Channel 4 Schools, with the new corporation administering the service and commissioning its programmes, some still from ITV, others from independent production.

In 2000, the service was renamed 4Learning and in April 2007, the commercial arm and rights exploitation of its programmes and support materials was sold to Espresso Education and renamed Channel 4 Learning.

In 2013, Discovery Education bought the company, folding Channel 4 Learning resources, Clipbank, and Espresso Primary into their wider Discovery Education UK digital learning platform.
