= Hollandsche Schouwburg =

Memorial and former theater building in Amsterdam, the Netherlands

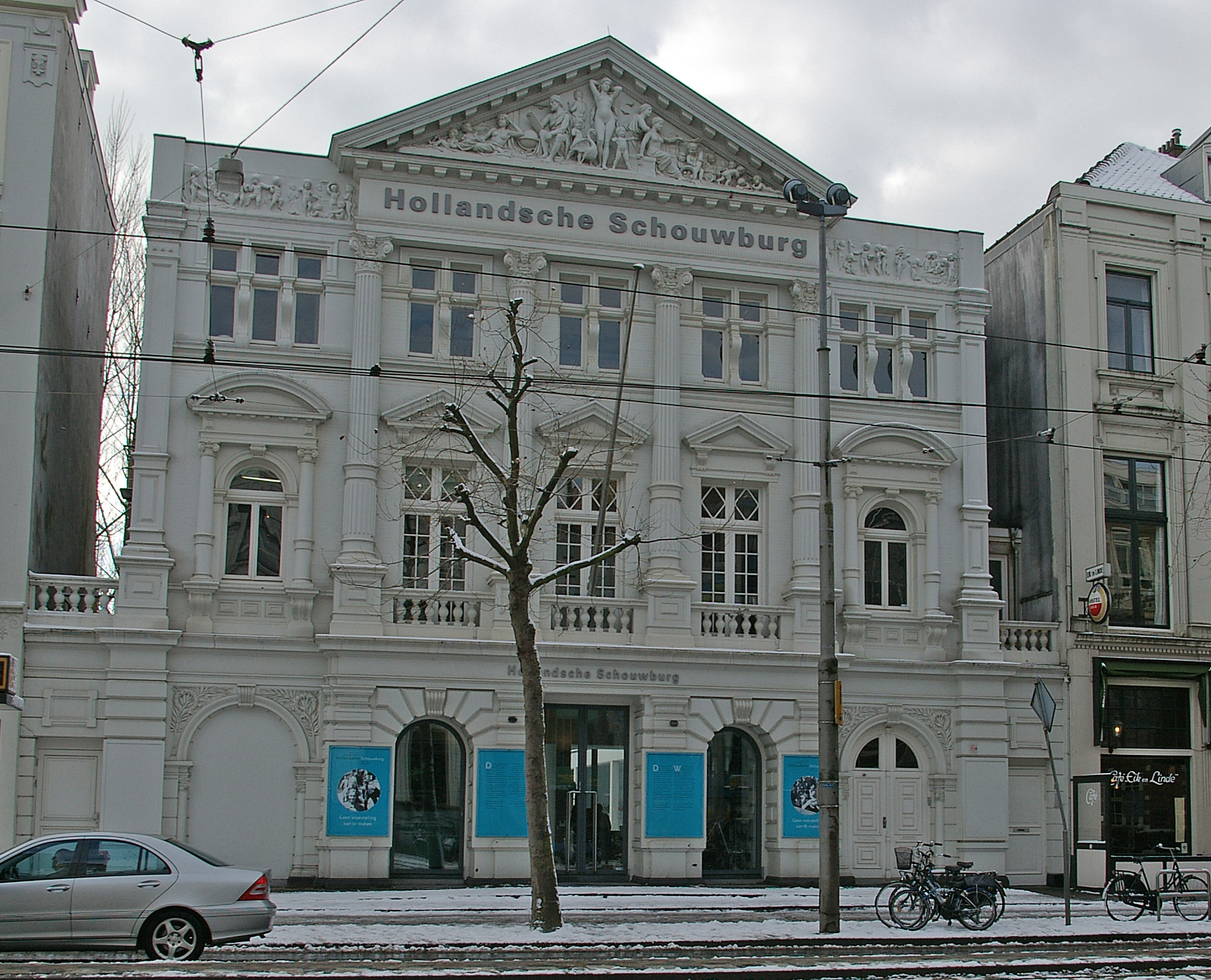
- Hollandsche Schouwburg in 2010

- Location within the city center of Amsterdam
- Established: 1962
- Location: Plantage Middenlaan 33hs Amsterdam, Netherlands
- Coordinates: 52.3665°N 4.9111°E
- Type: Memorial
- Director: Emile Schrijver
- Website: www.hollandscheschouwburg.nl

The Hollandsche Schouwburg (Dutch pronunciation: [ˈɦɔlɑntsə ˈsxʌubʏr(ə)x]; English: Hollandic Theatre) is a museum in Amsterdam in the Netherlands.

== History ==
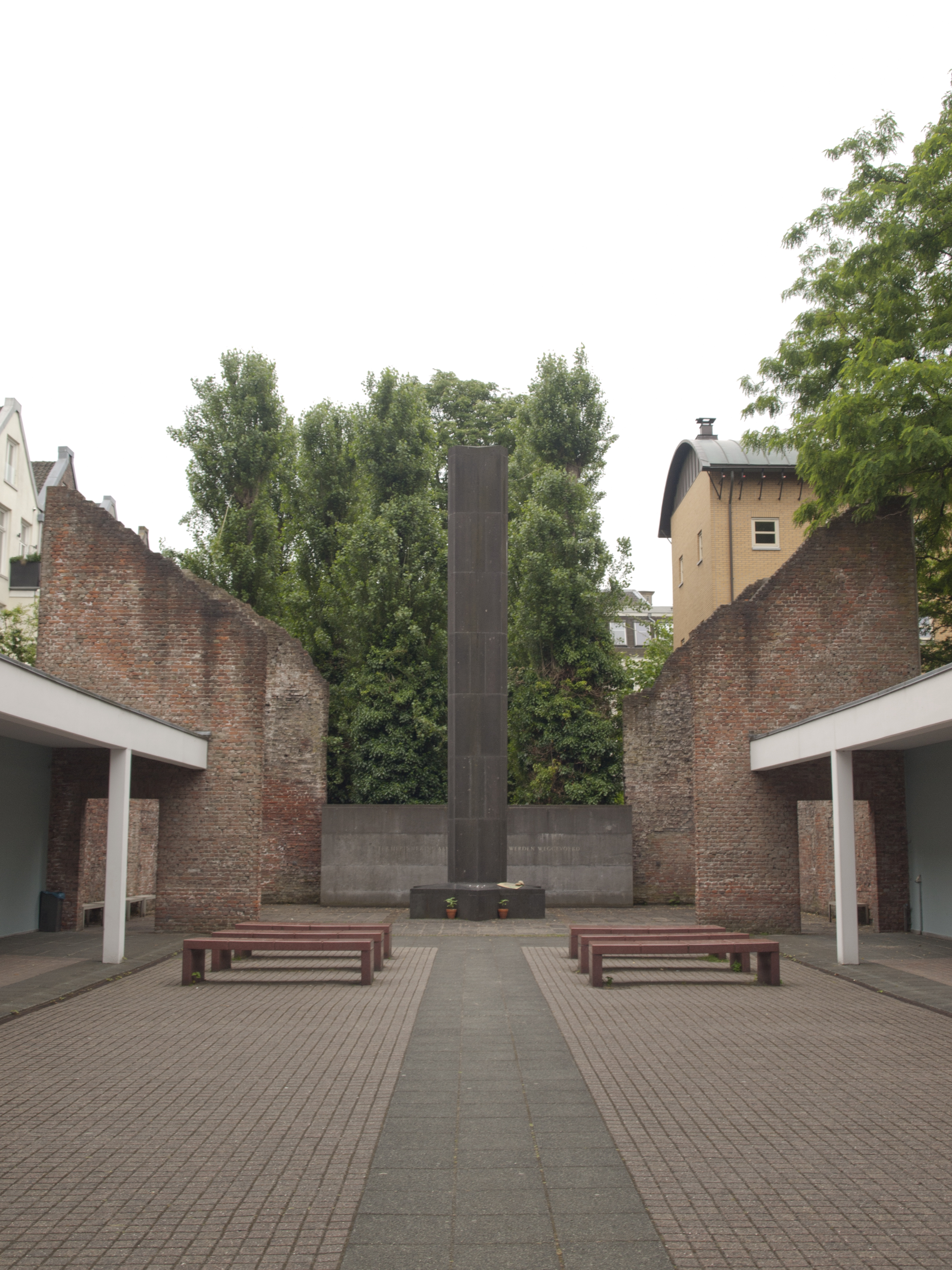
Monument at the Hollandsche Schouwburg

Originally, the Hollandsche Schouwburg was a Dutch theatre, but it was deemed a Jewish theatre in 1941 by Nazi occupiers, and it was later used as a deportation center during the Holocaust in the Netherlands. In 1942, teenaged Lydia Riezouw took five photographs from her home window of the Jewish prisoners being held at Hollandsche Schouwburg, which included her Jewish friend Greetje Velleman. This series of photographs by Riezouw have been shown at exhibitions worldwide.

On 4 May 1962, the theater was dedicated as a general memorial site by the mayor of Amsterdam. The auditorium of the theater was dedicated as a memorial to the Dutch victims of the Holocaust.

The illustrious personnel of the nursery opposite the Hollandsche Schouwburg located at the Plantage Middenlaan in Amsterdam saved many Jewish children. This is described in the book of resistance member Betty Goudsmit-Oudkerk.

The Jewish Historical Museum took over administration of the building in 1992. Renovations the following year added a memorial room and an exhibition and a wall engraved with some 6,700 surnames of the more than 100,000 Jewish deportees from the Netherlands.
