= Dan van Husen =

German actor (1945–2020)

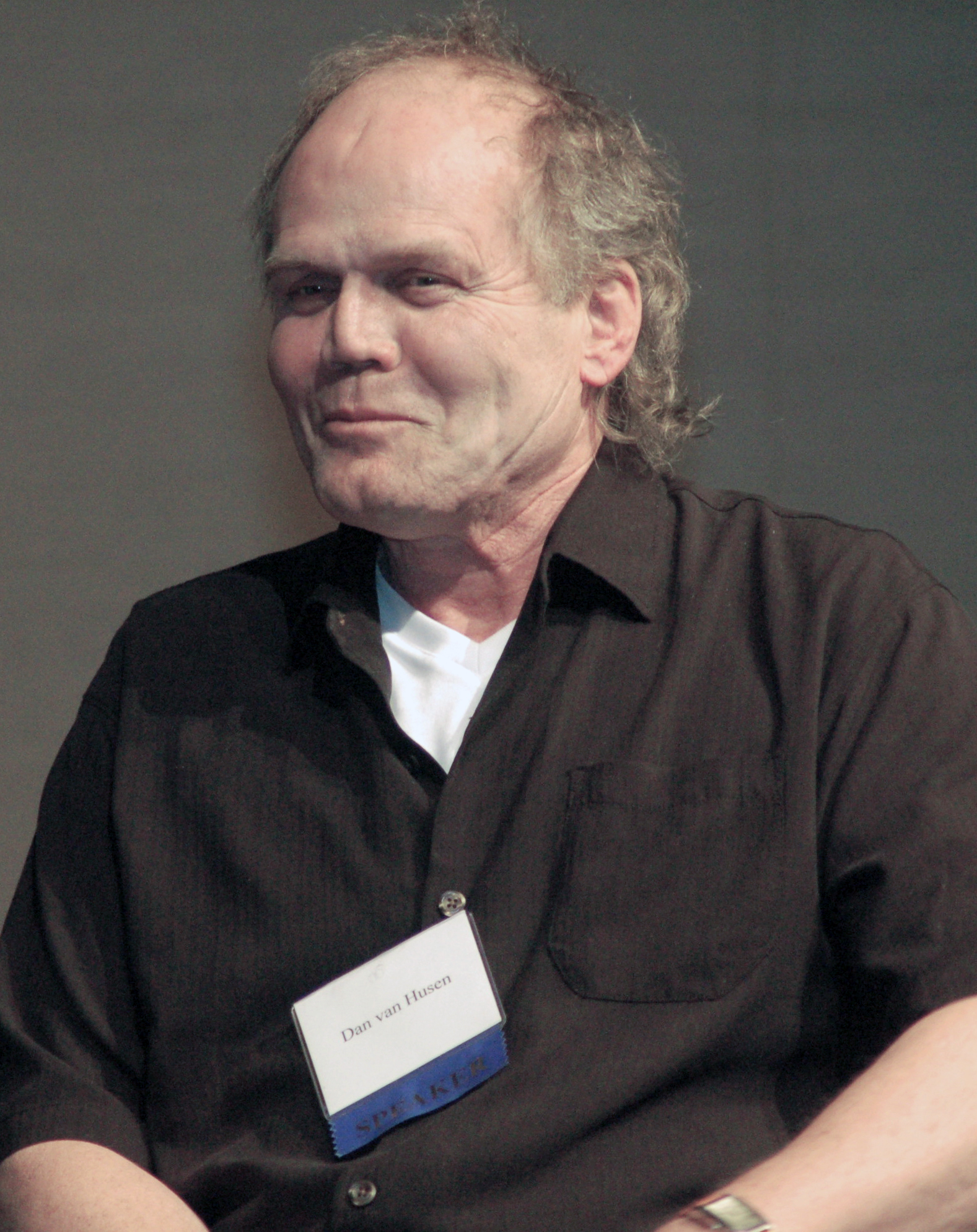
- Dan van Husen in 2011
- Born: 30 April 1945; Gummersbach, Westphalia, Prussia, Germany
- Died: 31 May 2020 (aged 75); Ilminster, Somerset, England
- Occupation: Actor
- Years active: 1968–2020

Dan van Husen (30 April 1945 – 31 May 2020) was a German actor. He started his career in the 1960s, playing in a number of Spaghetti Westerns (usually he was cast as the bad guy), and also performed in Italian and German films by renowned directors including Frederico Fellini and Werner Herzog and in German TV series. Starting in the 2000s he performed in Hollywood films, and in 2008 had a role in a Dutch World War 2 movie, Winter in Wartime.

== Early life ==
Dan van Husen was born in Gummersbach, Germany, on 30 April 1945, the day Adolf Hitler killed himself in Berlin.

== Career ==
He was first discovered by Italian producers while working as a club disc jockey in Spain and began working increasingly seriously as an actor in the late 1960s. He appeared in twenty Italo Westerns in six or seven years and before branching out to diverse roles and genres. In the years 1968-1974 he participated in more than 24 Italo Westerns, amongst others directed by Sergio Corbucci, Sergio Martino, Enzo G. Castellari etc. In 1977, he was also involved in the play Courage at the Schauspielhaus Bochum, directed by Jérôme Savary. He was cast as the bad guy in 90% of his films.

Van Husen was credited for numerous further film appearances such as Fellini Casanova, by Federico Fellini, in Salon Kitty by Tinto Brass and Nosferatu the Vampyre directed by Werner Herzog, amongst others.

He also worked in German TV series such as The Old Fox, Derrick, Alarm für Cobra 11 - Die Autobahnpolizei and many more. He was often cast as a rogue as in the television disaster film Tsunami or in the '80s cult film Ritchy Guitar of Michael Laux, and in the film Cold and Dark directed by Andrew Goth.

In 2001, he worked on Band of Brothers, a Steven Spielberg production, Perfect Strangers directed by Stephen Poliakoff and in Enemy at the Gates directed by Jean-Jacques Annaud, as well as Hart's War directed by Gregory Hoblit in 2002.

In 2006, he acted in the German television film Karol Woityla directed by Gero von Boehm and in 2007 in Gellert, a motion picture film under the direction of Ayassi with Ken Duken and the German TV crime series SOKO Wismar.

In February/March 2008, he worked on Winter in Wartime a Dutch movie based on the hit novel by the same name, written by Jan Terlouw and directed (and written) by Martin Koolhoven. In June and July 2010, he worked in southern California on the American Western film Scarlet Worm, in the role of the antagonist Heinrich Kley, directed by Michael Fredianelli.

Dan van Husen in 2007

In 2011, he worked on the American film production Tom Sawyer and Huckleberry Finn, directed by Jo Kastner, and was invited to the Spaghetti Western Film Festival in Los Angeles on 19 March of that year. He attended the Almería Western Film Festival from 8 to 11 September 2011, and received a lifetime achievement award in the western film genre. He was then invited to the Lund International Fantastic Film Festival in Sweden, from 15 to 24 September 2011. He attended the Cinefest 2011, VIII, and Internationales Festival des deutschen Film-Erbes Hamburg from 12 to 20 November 2011.

== Death ==
Dan van Husen died from COVID-19 in Ilminster, Somerset, England in May 2020, during the COVID-19 pandemic in England at age 75.

== Selected filmography ==
Van Husen played in film including:

- The Cats (1968) (uncredited)
- Las trompetas del apocalipsis (1969), as Beatnik (uncredited)
- Sundance and the Kid (1969), as Cowboy on the Train (uncredited)
- A Bullet for Sandoval (1969), as Mestizo
- Robin Hood: the Invincible Archer (1970)
- El Condor (1970), as Bandit
- Arizona Colt Returns (1970)
- The Arizona Kid (1970)
- More Dollars for the MacGregors (1970), as Frank Landon (uncredited)
- Cannon for Cordoba (1970), as Soldier (uncredited)
- Light the Fuse... Sartana Is Coming (1970), as Deputy Sheriff in Sandy Creek (uncredited)
- The Trojan Women (1971), as Soldier (uncredited)
- Doc (1971), as Clanton Cowboy (uncredited)
- Captain Apache (1971), as Al
- Catlow (1971), as Dutch
- Boulevard du Rhum (1971), as Un tireur (uncredited)
- Bad Man's River (1971)
- Kill! Kill! Kill! Kill! (1971), as Bodyguard (uncredited)
- Long Live Your Death (1971), as Kelly, Prison Guard
- Condenados a vivir (1972), as Lackey (uncredited)
- Sonny and Jed (1972), as Bounty Hunter (uncredited)
- Cry of the Black Wolves (1972), as Joe
- Pancho Villa (1972), as Bart
- The Deadly Avenger of Soho (1972), as Kronstel
- Alleluja & Sartana are Sons... Sons of God (1972)
- Verflucht, dies Amerika (1973) (uncredited)
- Zinksärge für die Goldjungen (1973), as O'Brian
- Tendre et perverse Emanuelle (1973), as Inspecteur Siodmak
- La noche de los asesinos (1974), as Albert Pagan (uncredited)
- The White, the Yellow, and the Black (1975), as Albino, Donovan's Cousin (uncredited)
- John Glückstadt (1975), as Wenzel
- Cipolla Colt (1975), as Deputy Zachary
- Berlinger (1975)
- Salon Kitty (1976), as Rauss
- Strongman Ferdinand (1976) (uncredited)
- Potato Fritz (1976), as Smoothie Nestler
- Anita Drögemöller und die Ruhe an der Ruhr (1976), as Killer
- Fellini's Casanova (1976), as Viderol / Faulkircher's lover (uncredited)
- Paradies (1976)
- Eierdiebe (1977)
- Invitation to the Dance (1977, TV Movie), as Zaplata
- Kiss Me Killer (1977), as Jules (uncredited)
- The Rip-Off (1978), as Hans
- Nosferatu the Vampyre (1979), as Warden
- Beware of Schwarzenbeck (1979), as Security Guard
- The Lady Vanishes (1979), as 2nd Killer
- Bloodline (1979), as Cameraman
- Avalanche Express (1979), as Bernardo
- Lena Rais (1979), as Harry
- Graf Dracula in Oberbayern (1979), as Franz
- Derrick (1979-1980, TV Series), as Walter Lohmann / Moersch
- Why the UFOs Steal Our Lettuce (1980)
- The Sea Wolves (1980), as U-boat First Officer
- Strike Back (1981)
- Freak Orlando (1981), as Lederboy
- Be Gentle, Penguin (1982)
- Comeback (1982), as Pimp
- Ich bin dein Killer (1982), as Danny
- Richy Guitar (1985), as Tough Guy
- Gotcha! (1985), as Man in Shadow
- Wild Geese II (1985), as Stroebling's Driver
- The Holcroft Covenant (1985), as Journalist (uncredited)
- Alpha City (1985), as Brute
- Morena (1986), as Henry, Street Painter
- Enemy at the Gates (2001), as Political Officer
- Hart's War (2002), as Boxcar Sergeant
- Killer Barbys vs. Dracula (2002), as Seaward
- Darkhunters (2004), as Jack
- Tsunami: Terror in the North Sea (2005, TV Movie), as Kramlick
- Cold and Dark (2005), as Solly Tunkel
- Forest of the Damned (2005), as Crazy Old Man
- Drawn in Blood (2006), as Bergen
- The Man Who Sold the World (2006), as Zisna
- Winter in Wartime (2008), as Auer
- The Scarlet Worm (2011), as Heinrich Kley
- One Last Game (2011), as Obonya
- Killing all the Flies (2013, TV Movie), as Simon Moskovitz
- Tom Sawyer & Huckleberry Finn (2014), as Windy
- Zombie Massacre 2: Reich of the Dead (2015), as Doktor Mengele
- Brimstone (2016), as Coach Driver
- EXCRETION: The Shocking True Story of the Football Moms (2017), as Dr. Helmut Rechte
- In Search of Fellini (2017), as Dan van Husen
- Le Accelerator (2017), as The Death Advisor
- The Price of Death (2018), as Wolfgang
- Beyond Fury (2019), as Reverend Tony Mortimer
