= Winter in Wartime (disambiguation) =

Winter in Wartime is a 1972 novel for young adults by the Dutch writer Jan Terlouw.

Winter in Wartime may also refer to:

- Oorlogswinter (Winter in Wartime), a 1975 Dutch miniseries based on the novel, directed by Aart Staartjes
- Winter in Wartime (film), a 2008 Dutch film based on the novel, written and directed by Martin Koolhoven
