= Toonen =

Toonen may refer to:

== People ==
- Arne Toonen (born 1975), Dutch film director
- Rik Toonen (born 1954), Dutch water polo player

== Legal ==
- Toonen v. Australia, 1994 human rights case in Australia
