= Rogier Stoffers =

Dutch cinematographer (born 1961)

Rogier Stoffers, ASC (born 9 November 1961) is a Dutch cinematographer known for his extensive work in both film and television, shooting movies like Quills, John Q., School of Rock, and Disturbia. He has been nominated for a Primetime Emmy Award and an ASC Award, and is the recipient of a Golden Frog award from the prestigious Camerimage Film Festival.

== Life and career ==
Stoffers was born in the municipality of Utrecht in the Netherlands, and studied French, and film and Theatre sciences, at Utrecht University, before being accepted into the Cinematography program at the Netherlands Film Academy. He was brought under the wing of director Mike van Diem, with whom he collaborated on the critically acclaimed crime drama Character, which won the Academy Award for Best Foreign Language Film.

After relocating to the United States, he shot the Academy Award-nominated period drama Quills, and the Denzel Washington-starring thriller film John Q. He has since shot numerous well-received mainstream films including Masked and Anonymous, School of Rock, and The Secret Life of Bees, collaborating with directors like Michael Apted, Richard Linklater, Neil LaBute, Ivan Reitman and Eli Roth. His work on the HBO biopic Hemingway & Gellhorn earned him a nomination for a Primetime Emmy Award for Outstanding Cinematography for a Limited Series or Movie.

== Filmography ==
=== Film ===
| Year | Title | Director | Notes |
|---|---|---|---|
| 1989 | Alaska | Mike van Diem | |
| 1997 | Character | Mike van Diem | |
| 1997 | Liefdesgasten | Albert ter Heerdt | |
| 1997 | Sancta mortale | Ilse Somers | Short film |
| 1998 | De man met de hond | Annette Apon | |
| 1998 | FL 19,99 | Mart Dominicus | |
| 1999 | Under the Palms | Miriam Kruishoop | |
| 2000 | Papa's Song | Sander Francken | |
| 2000 | Quills | Philip Kaufman | |
| 2002 | John Q. | Nick Cassavetes | |
| 2002 | Enough | Michael Apted | |
| 2003 | Masked and Anonymous | Larry Charles | |
| 2003 | School of Rock | Richard Linklater | |
| 2005 | Bad News Bears | Richard Linklater | |
| 2007 | Disturbia | D.J. Caruso | |
| 2007 | Mongol | Sergei Bodrov | With Sergei Trofimov |
| 2008 | The Secret Life of Bees | Gina Prince-Bythewood | |
| 2008 | Lakeview Terrace | Neil LaBute | |
| 2009 | Balls Out: Gary the Tennis Coach | Danny Leiner | |
| 2010 | Death at a Funeral | Neil LaBute | |
| 2011 | No Strings Attached | Ivan Reitman | |
| 2012 | The Vow | Michael Sucsy | |
| 2012 | Branded | Jamie Bradshaw; Alexander Dulerayn | |
| 2013 | Some Velvet Morning | Neil LaBute | |
| 2013 | The F Word | Michael Dowse | |
| 2014 | 10 Things I Hate About Life | Gil Junger | Unreleased |
| 2015 | Careful What You Wish For | Elizabeth Allen Rosenbaum | |
| 2015 | Dirty Weekend | Neil LaBute | |
| 2015 | The Surprise | Mike van Diem | |
| 2016 | Brimstone | Martin Koolhoven | |
| 2016 | The Disappointments Room | D.J. Caruso | |
| 2018 | Every Day | Michael Sucsy | |
| 2018 | Death Wish | Eli Roth | |
| 2018 | The House with a Clock in Its Walls | Eli Roth | |
| 2019 | A Dog's Journey | Gail Mancuso | |
| 2020 | Work It | Laura Terruso | |
| 2022 | Redeeming Love | D. J. Caruso | |
| 2023 | About My Father | Laura Terruso | |
| 2023 | Fear the Night | Neil LaBute | |
| 2024 | Borderlands | Eli Roth | |
| 2024 | Between Borders | Mark Freiburger | |
| 2025 | Baab | Nayla Al Khaja | |

=== Television ===
| Year | Title | Director | Notes |
|---|---|---|---|
| 1992–1994 | Sjans | Maarten Treurniet | 26 episodes |
| 1993-1995 | Pleidooi | | |
| 1996 | In naam der koningin | Bram van Erkel | |
| 1996 | Tijd van leven | André van Duren | |

TV movies

| Year | Title | Director |
|---|---|---|
| 2012 | Hemingway & Gellhorn | Philip Kaufman |
| 2012 | Scruples | Michael Sucsy |

== Awards and nominations ==
| Year | Award | Category | Title | Result |
|---|---|---|---|---|
| 2012 | Primetime Emmy Awards | Outstanding Cinematography for a Limited Series or Movie | Hemingway & Gellhorn | Nominated |
| 2016 | Golden Calf | Best Photography | Brimstone | Won |
