= Winter in Wartime =

Novel by Jan Terlouw

Oorlogswinter
- English language hardcover edition
- Author: Jan Terlouw
- Original title: Oorlogswinter
- Translator: Laura Watkinson (2019 edition)
- Language: Dutch (includes German and English)
- Subject: World War II
- Genre: Historical fiction, juvenile fiction
- Published: Rotterdam: Lemniscaat, 1971 (original); New York: McGraw-Hill, 1976; London: Pushkin Press, 2019
- Publication place: Netherlands
- Media type: Novel
- Pages: 169
- ISBN: 9780070635043
- OCLC: 1959593

Winter in Wartime (Oorlogswinter, 1972) is a novel by the Dutch writer Jan Terlouw. The story is about a 15-year-old Dutch boy who lives through the last winter of World War II and is based on the author's recollections; Terlouw was eight when the German army invaded the Netherlands.

== Background ==
Jan Terlouw was born in Kamperveen in 1931, but moved to the village of Wezep in the Veluwe region in the last year of World War II. Terlouw's father was dominee in the local parish. Due to the fact that Terlouw's father was involved in the local community as a result of being a dominee, he was arrested twice by the Nazi forces, but released each time after a few days.

Terlouw stated multiple times that he did not take part in any Resistance-related activities, but that he saw city dwellers who came to the village during the time of the Dutch famine. Terlouw stated: "But this was really 'my' war. Like I experienced those years. Others might have described the war from the perspective of a camp prisoner or from the bombarded cities. I have not done anything heroic, the war happened to me, just like with so many people. My only contribution is that I wrote it down."

Terlouw became a scientist and in 1971 a member of Dutch parliament as part of D66, a then new left-liberal party. As an author, Terlouw debuted in 1970 with the novel Pjotr and published his second novel How to become King in 1971. Both novels had received wide critical acclaim.

The novel is partially autobiographical. Terlouw, like the protagonist Michiel, was unable to go to school in the last winter of the war due to ongoing bombardments on bridges over the IJssel river. Terlouw was concerned with running errands and helping out of local farms too. Next to that, Terlouw had a neighbour who was involved in an attack on a ration card office, similarly to Dirk Knopper.

== Plot ==
Michiel van Beusekom is an average but enterprising teenager. He lives in a village in the northern part of the Veluwe region on the banks of the IJssel river and is the son of the village's burgemeester. Michiel has one sister, nurse-to-be Erica, and one brother, Jochem, who is still in primary school.

Each day a vast number of city dwellers arrive in the village and several stay in the Van Beusekom house. Michiel spends his days with tracking down food for them by helping local farmers with small chores. He is, after all, unable to go to school due to ongoing bombardments and railway strikes.

Michiel secretly dreams of becoming a Resistance fighter, and sometimes loathes his father Jan, who, in Michiel's eyes, is too soft. As a result, Uncle Ben, who claims to be part of the Resistance, becomes Michiel's idol.

On a day in late 1944, 21-year-old Dirk Knopper, who lives opposite to the Van Beusekom house, tells Michiel a secret. Together with two others, Dirk is planning an attack on the local ration card office to steal ration cards as part of the Resistance. Michiel gets the task, in case the attack fails, to deliver a letter to Bertus van Gelder as soon as possible. That same evening, Nazi vehicles arrive at the Knopper home. The attack has failed.

When Michiel tries to deliver the letter to Bertus van Gelder the following morning, he receives several setbacks. First his bike breaks, then he gets delayed by an Allied air raid and in the afternoon, he feels he is being spied on by Schafter, a farmer of whom everybody thinks is a secret Nazi ally. Due to this, Michiel fails to deliver the letter. That same day, Bertus van Gelder is arrested by Nazi forces looking for that letter.

When Michiel discovers this, he initially thinks of throwing the letter away, but eventually he decides to read it. He discovers that Dirk Knopper has been hiding an English pilot called Jack in a self-made burrow in the forest near the village. Dirk had wanted Bertus van Gelder to take over Jack's maintenance, but as Bertus was arrested, Michiel decides to take it over himself, with all the consequences it has.

== Main themes ==
=== The grey area between being "good" or "bad" ===
Jan Terlouw's primary purpose, he said, was to make it clear to readers that they should not think, after finishing the book, that the war had somehow been a glorious period. His second purpose was to provide — in a moderate manner — a human face for the Germans, something he said had not yet been done by the early 1970s. Oorlogswinter shows the grey area between the traditional "good" and "bad" rhetoric many people held towards World War II in the Netherlands. Shortly after the war, the general perception that Dutch people held was that people morally chose to be either "good": supporting the Dutch Resistance and openly rejecting national socialism; or "bad": collaborating or supporting the Nazi regime and being friends with or having relationships with Nazi soldiers.

In the novel, Michiel's parents are seen clashing over whether the Germans are all to blame for Hitler; and a Nazi soldier saves Jochem. Schafter, of whom everybody is convinced is a Nazi ally since he's frequently striking up a conversation with the local Nazi officers, turns out to be a well-respected Resistance fighter who hid Jews in his basement for several years. Uncle Ben, on the other hand, who treats Michiel like a son, is secretly a Nazi spy.

Dirk Knopper, a stoic Resistance fighter to whom Michiel looks up, killed a Nazi officer in the forest when this officer tried to kill Jack. However, he could have prevented the execution of Michiel's father and four others by reporting himself to the police. When Dirk gets the opportunity to kill Uncle Ben, after he found out that he was behind the treason, Dirk let him stay alive.

Mr Posthuma, the head of the Resistance in de Vlank is also nowhere close to the descriptions of a heroic leader, but rather a shy and reserved school teacher.

=== World War II peace did not lead to world peace ===
Oorlogswinter ends with Michiel and Dirk striking up a conversation on how they should fight "against war" and not "in war". The last chapter dictates that Michiel, being 43 in 1972, is well aware of the many violent conflicts and wars that have happened all over the world since 1945. Terlouw ends his novel by summing up countries in which these conflicts and wars occurred, including Northern Ireland, Indonesia, the Vietnam and "many, many more".

In his 1975 television adaption, director Aart Staartjes included the theme with a conversation between Michiel, Dirk, Mz. Van Beusekom and the notary, one of the prisoners who was not executed. While Michiel stated that he and Dirk were going to make sure that the world would stay in peace, the notary questions this possibility. Over these images, Aart Staartjes pasted the list of countries that Terlouw named in his book.

== Reception ==
Oorlogswinter is one of the most popular Dutch books of the postwar period. It sold an estimated half a million copies, and library estimates indicate that more than a million children read the book.

In 1973, the novel won the Gouden Griffel, with Terlouw winning the prize for the second time in a row.

== Adaptations ==
- In 1975, a 13-episode Dutch television mini-series adaptation, Oorlogswinter, directed by Aart Staartjes, was broadcast on the public television station Nederland 1 (now NPO 1).
- In 2008, a feature film adaptation of the book, Winter in Wartime, directed by Martin Koolhoven, was premiered in Amsterdam and the Netherlands.
- On 1 October 2011, Oorlogswinter, a Dutch musical based on the novel, and directed by Rogier van de Weerd, choreographed by Eefke Heit Brink, and scored by Klaas van Donkersgoed and Marieke van Diepen, was premiered at the Zaantheater in Zaandam, North Holland.
- In April 2020, a theatre production based on the storyline of Oorlogswinter was to be staged, but was eventually cancelled due to the COVID-19 pandemic.
