= Horace Cohen =

American-Dutch actor and comedian

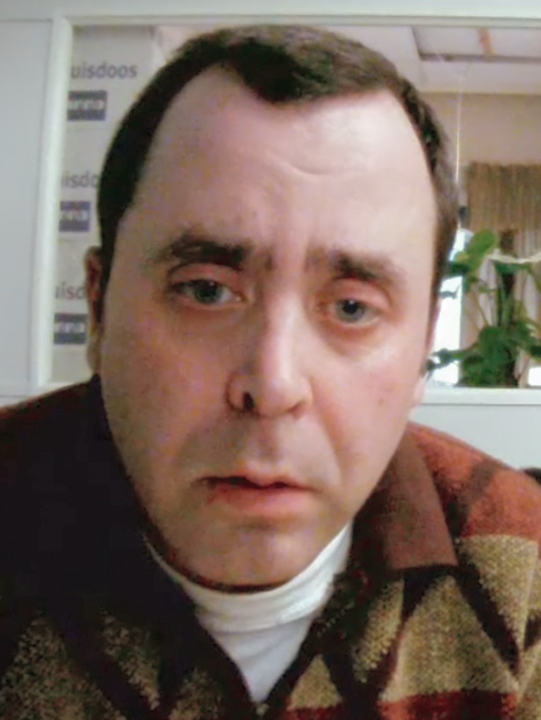
- Born: Horace Joshua Cohen; 15 October 1971 (age 55); New York City, United States
- Occupations: Actor, comedian

Horace Joshua Cohen (born October 15, 1971) is an American-Dutch actor and comedian. His career has spanned various roles in Dutch cinema and international projects, including "Brush with Fate" (2003), "Black Out" (2012), and the Golden Film award-winning "Amsterdam Vice" (2019).

In addition to his film work, Cohen has appeared in the soap opera "Goede tijden, slechte tijden," and participated in reality shows like "I'm a Celebrity...Get Me Out of Here!" and "Wie is de Mol?".

== Career ==
=== Film ===
Cohen made his debut at age 15 as Henkie in the 1986 film Flodder directed by Dick Maas. This role was played by other actors in sequels and the spin-off television series. Cohen did make an appearance in small roles in the television series.

In 2003, he played a role in the television film Brush with Fate.

In 2012, he played a role in the film Black Out directed by Arne Toonen. In 2019, he played a role in Amsterdam Vice (Baantjer: Het Begin), also by Arne Toonen. The film won the Golden Film award two weeks later after having sold 100,000 tickets.

=== Television ===
Between 1991 and 1994 he played a small role in the soap opera Goede tijden, slechte tijden.

He was a contestant in 2003 in the television show Bobo's in the bush, the Dutch version of I'm a Celebrity...Get Me Out of Here!.

In 2010, he was one of the team captains in the television show Gehaktdag in which a Dutch celebrity is satirically critiqued by two teams.

In 2011, he was one of the contestants in Wie is de Mol? which took place in El Salvador and Nicaragua that year. He had to leave the show in the third episode. Since that year, his phrase "Trust nobody" is used in the show's introduction. In 2020, he appeared in a special anniversary edition of the show, called Wie is de Mol? Renaissance, which featured only contestants of previous seasons. This time, he also had to leave the show in the third episode.

In 2021, he appeared in the game show Code van Coppens - De Wraak van de Belgen in which teams need to escape from an escape room.

=== Theater ===
In 2018, he took part in the 25th anniversary show of Boom Chicago.

== Personal life ==
Horace Cohen was born in New York City and raised in Amsterdam. He has a Jewish-American father and a Dutch mother.

He was previously in a relationship with Sanne Kraaijkamp, a daughter of John Kraaijkamp.

Cohen married his wife Puck in June 2017. They have a daughter, born in 2015, and a son, born in 2018. Cohen also has a daughter from a previous relationship.

== Selected filmography ==
=== As actor ===
- 1986: Flodder
- 2003: Brush with Fate
- 2011: Amsterdam Heavy
- 2012: Black Out
- 2015: The Little Gangster
- 2019: Amsterdam Vice (Baantjer: Het Begin)

=== As contestant ===
- 2026: Nederlands Domste
