= Bobo's in the bush =

Dutch reality television series

Bobo's in the bush is the Dutch version of I'm a Celebrity...Get Me Out of Here!.

== Series ==
- Winner

=== Season 1 ===
Was shot in Borneo, Indonesia and ran from 20 March to 27 June 2003 on RTL. There were ten contestants:

Celebrity	Famous for
Danny Rook	TV presenter
Horace Cohen	Actor
Peggy Jane de Schepper	Actress
Mari Carmen Oudendijk	TV presenter
Sabine Koning	Actress
Sander Janson	TV presenter
Christine van der Horst	Television show host
Jimmy Geduld	Actor
Inge Ipenburg	Actress
Henk Bres	Columnist / Radio show host

=== Season 2 ===
8 March 2004 to 3 July 2004 on RTL. There were ten contestants:

Celebrity	Famous for
Anouk van Nes	Actress
Robert Schoemacher	Physician
Mental Theo	DJ
Micky Hoogendijk	Actress
Chris Tates	Singer
Sander Foppele	Actor
Cindy Pielstroom	TV host
Henk Schiffmacher	Tattooer
Xandra Brood	Stylist
Bonnie St. Claire	Singer

=== Season 3 ===
Was shot in Brazil and Argentina and ran from 7 March to 16 May 2005 on RTL. There were ten contestants:

Celebrity	Famous for
Ferri Somogyi	Actor
Jessica Gal	Judoka
Ruud Benard	Reality TV-star
Jody Bernal	Singer
Lizelotte van Dijk	Actress
Fajah Lourens	Actress
Valerie Zwikker	TV-host
Jacques Herb	Singer
Menno Köhler	Dancer
Viola Holt	TV-host

== Notable contestants ==
- Horace Cohen in 2003
