= Onderweg =

2000 song by Abel

Single by Abel

from the album De stilte voorbij
- Language: Dutch
- Released: 14 January 2000
- Genre: Nederpop
- Length: 3:10
- Label: PIAS
- Songwriter: Joris Rasenberg
- Producer: Rob van Donselaar

Abel singles chronology
"3 dagen zon" (1999)	"Onderweg" (2000)	"Neem me mee" (2000)

"Onderweg" (transl. "On the Road") is a song by the Dutch band Abel. It was released on 14 January 2000 as the second single from their debut album De stilte voorbij. It was written by the band's singer Joris Rasenberg.

The song was number one for six weeks on the Dutch Top 40 beginning in February 2000. It also reached number two in the Flanders region of Belgium. The song was a unique hit for featuring Rasenberg's southern Dutch accent, including his usage of the soft G. It was named the fourth-biggest hit of 2000 in the Netherlands. The band did not repeat the same success after the song, and are considered a one-hit wonder.

In 2018, the song was interpolated by rappers Frenna and Lil' Kleine on the song "Verleden tijd", which also spent six weeks at number one in the Netherlands.

== Background ==
Abel, a band from the city Breda, began in 1996 by doing cover songs in cafes. They released their debut single "3 dagen zon" (lit. '3 Days of Sun') in 1999. On 8 January 2000, Abel performed at the Noorderslag festival in Groningen, which focused on emerging Dutch music talent. Shortly afterwards, the band released "Onderweg" as a single. The band almost did not include the song on the album. "It was just one of the songs we had written for us, but we didn't necessarily think it was the best song and the demo was already quite long," singer and songwriter Joris Rasenberg told Business Insider.

"Onderweg" is a breakup song. The verses describe how the protagonist of the song travels a certain route, from home to a bus and then to a train. In the chorus, the narrator thinks back to the good times with his lover, but eventually comes to the conclusion that they did not fit together.

The single sold over 250,000 copies in the Benelux region. The band was not able to sustain success, and would lose several members. In 2004, Rasenberg began a career as a music teacher at a secondary school.

== Music video ==
The music video starred Dutch actress Birgit Schuurman. It was filmed in the Amstelveenseweg metro station.

== Legacy ==
"Onderweg" is seen as a Nederpop classic. Lyrics from the song are written on the western pillars of the Breda bus station. Since 2001, the song has appeared on the country's Top 2000 greatest songs of all time poll, reaching its highest spot of 198 in 2018.

In 2011, Anouk released an English-language cover of the song, titled "What Have You Done", as a single for her seventh studio album To Get Her Together. It reached No. 14 on the Dutch Top 40.

In 2014, Guus Meeuwis covered "Onderweg" on his album Hollandse Meesters. It was a collaboration with the New Cool Collective Big Band.

In 2018, rappers Frenna and Lil' Kleine heavily interpolated "Onderweg" on their song "Verleden tijd", which like the original also reached No. 1 on the Dutch Top 40 for six weeks.

== Charts ==
=== Weekly charts ===
Weekly chart performance for "Onderweg"
Chart (2000)	Peak position
Belgium (Ultratop 50 Flanders)	2
Netherlands (Dutch Top 40)	1
Netherlands (Single Top 100)	1

=== Yearly charts ===
Year-end chart performance for "Onderweg"
Chart (2000)	Position
Belgium (Ultratop 50 Flanders)	5
Netherlands (Dutch Top 40)	4
Netherlands (Single Top 100)	4

=== Decade-end charts ===
Decade-end chart performance for "Onderweg"
Chart (2000–2009)	Position
Netherlands (Single Top 100)	13
