= Black Out (2012 film) =

2012 film by Arne Toonen

- Directed by: Arne Toonen
- Written by: Melle Runderkamp; Arne Toonen
- Based on: Merg en Been by Gerben Hellinga
- Produced by: Brendan J. Byrne; Katie Holly
- Starring: Raymond Thiry; Kim van Kooten; Bas Keijzer; Renée Fokker; Edmond Classen; Katja Schuurman; Birgit Schuurman
- Cinematography: Jeroen de Bruin
- Edited by: Marc Bechtold; Brian Ent
- Music by: Jurriaan Balhuizen; Pieter Brouwer; Tom Sikkers; Koen van Baal
- Production companies: Hazazah Pictures; Orange Film
- Distributed by: Benelux Film Distributors
- Release date: 26 January 2012
- Running time: 92 minutes
- Country: Netherlands
- Language: Dutch

Black Out is a 2012 Dutch crime action comedy film.

== Plot ==
Jos Vreeswijk (Thiry) is a former criminal who wakes up one day before his wedding to find a murdered corpse beside him, and no recollection of the night before.

== Cast ==
- Raymond Thiry as Jos Vreeswijk
- Kim van Kooten as Caroline
- Bas Keijzer as Bobbie
- Renée Fokker as Coca Inez
- Edmond Classen as Charles
- Katja Schuurman as Charity
- Birgit Schuurman as Petra
- Willie Wartaal as Wally
- Kempi as Björn
- Simon Armstrong as Vlad
- Ursul de Geer as Rudolf
- Alex van Warmerdam as André
- Marwan Kenzari as Youssef
- Robert de Hoog as Gianni
- Horace Cohen as Rex
- Semmy Schilt as Abel

== Reception ==
On review aggregator Rotten Tomatoes, the film holds an approval rating of 45% based on 11 reviews, with an average rating of 5.17/10.

== Awards ==
- Rembrandt Awards 2013 Nominee - Best Film
- Rembrandt Awards 2013 Nominee - Best Actor, Raymond Thiry
- Netherlands Film Festival Golden Calf 2013 Nominee - Best Supporting Actor, Bas Keijzer
- Netherlands Film Festival Golden Calf 2013 Nominee - Best Cinematography, Jeroen de Bruin
