= Blood, Sweat & Tears (film) =

2015 Dutch biographical film

- Theatrical release poster
- Directed by: Diederick Koopal
- Screenplay by: Frank Ketelaar
- Produced by: Leontine Petit; Joost de Vries; Derk-Jan Warrink
- Starring: Martijn Fischer; Hadewych Minis; Matheu Hinzen; Fedja van Huêt; Raymond Thiry; Marcel Hensema
- Cinematography: Bert Pot
- Edited by: Marc Bechtold; Manu Van Hove
- Production companies: Lemming Film; A Private View; AVROTROS
- Distributed by: A-Film Benelux
- Release date: 2 April 2015
- Country: Netherlands
- Language: Dutch
- Box office: $3,022,653

Bloed, zweet & tranen, also known as Blood, Sweat & Tears, is a Dutch biographical film about the late Dutch singer André Hazes. The movie, named after Hazes' song Bloed, zweet en tranen, was directed by Diederick Koopal and released in 2015. Starring actors are Martijn Fischer (who plays Hazes), Hadewych Minis, Fedja van Huêt, and Matheu Hinzen.

== Plot ==
The movie focuses on three stages in Hazes' life and are shown in no particular order.

- As an 8-year-old, Hazes is ordered by his aggressive father Joop to sing in pubs and at markets. Joop uses the collected money to buy his drinks and even forces his son to drink beer. One day, the famous John Kraaijkamp Sr. hears André singing at the Albert Cuyp Market. He tries to convince Joop to have André on national television. Joop is not impressed; he thinks that his other son sings much better, until he finds out about the financial benefits. The performance is a success, and subsequently Hazes records two duets with Kraaijkamp (Droomschip and Juanita) for single-release; it makes no impact.
- As an adult, Hazes runs a pub and builds up a reputation as a "singing bartender". He enjoys his first chart-hit with Eenzame kerst (Lonely Christmas) which is distributed by Philips Records. When Hazes ends this collaboration, EMI sends Tim Griek - one of their producers - to the pub to convince Hazes to join them. Hazes initially declines because he's expected to sing levenslied (Dutch sentimental songs about everyday life) instead of his beloved blues; but he changes his mind when Griek convinces him that the time is not right to record a blues album (that would happen in the late 1980s). Hazes becomes close friends with Griek, although they have their tensions, which are often caused by Hazes' excessive drinking alcohol abuse. The friendship temporarily ends when Hazes reveals that he has an affair with a fifteen-year-old girl called Rachel. Soon afterward, Griek gets involved in a car accident and drowns in the nearby river.
- In his final stage, Hazes prepares for his farewell performance in Amsterdam Arena which is scheduled for September 27, 2004. This is not an easy task because of his addiction to alcohol (mainly Heineken) and cigarettes (mainly Camel); he is also deaf and has diabetes. A few weeks before this final performance, he even had to stop his show as he was too drunk; his health deteriorated. On September 21, 2004, a sick Hazes falls into a coma whilst dreaming about his performance in Amsterdam Arena. He passes away two days later. The farewell performance does take place but becomes a tribute.

== Cast ==
- Martijn Fischer - André Hazes
- Hadewych Minis - Rachel Hazes
- Fedja van Huêt - Tim Griek
- Matheu Hinzen - young André Hazes
- Raymond Thiry - Joop Hazes
- Marcel Hensema - Johnny Kraaijkamp
- Barbara Sobels - Miep Hazes
- Eric Corton - Karel
- Loek Peters - Robert de Waal
- Bert Luppes - Cees Baas
