= Come-Back! =

1981 film

- Directed by: Jonne Severijn
- Written by: Alma Popeyus; Jonne Severijn
- Starring: Theu Boermans
- Cinematography: Egbert Alterna
- Release date: 15 October 1981
- Running time: 120 minutes
- Country: Netherlands
- Language: Dutch

Come-Back! is a 1981 Dutch drama film co-written and directed by Jonne Severijn and starring Theu Boermans. The film was selected as the Dutch entry for the Best Foreign Language Film at the 54th Academy Awards, but was not accepted as a nominee.

== Cast ==
- Ab Abspoel as Maas
- Bert André as Pater
- Barbara Barendrecht
- Theu Boermans as Ab Goeree
- Huib Broos as Harry
- Edmond Classen as Arts
- Arnica Elsendoorn
- Ge Frankenhuizen
- Ad Frigge as Niemeyer
- Paul Gieske as Hans
- Marina de Graaf as Verpleegster

== See also ==
- List of submissions to the 54th Academy Awards for Best Foreign Language Film
- List of Dutch submissions for the Academy Award for Best Foreign Language Film
