= Forum Groningen =

Cultural center in Groningen

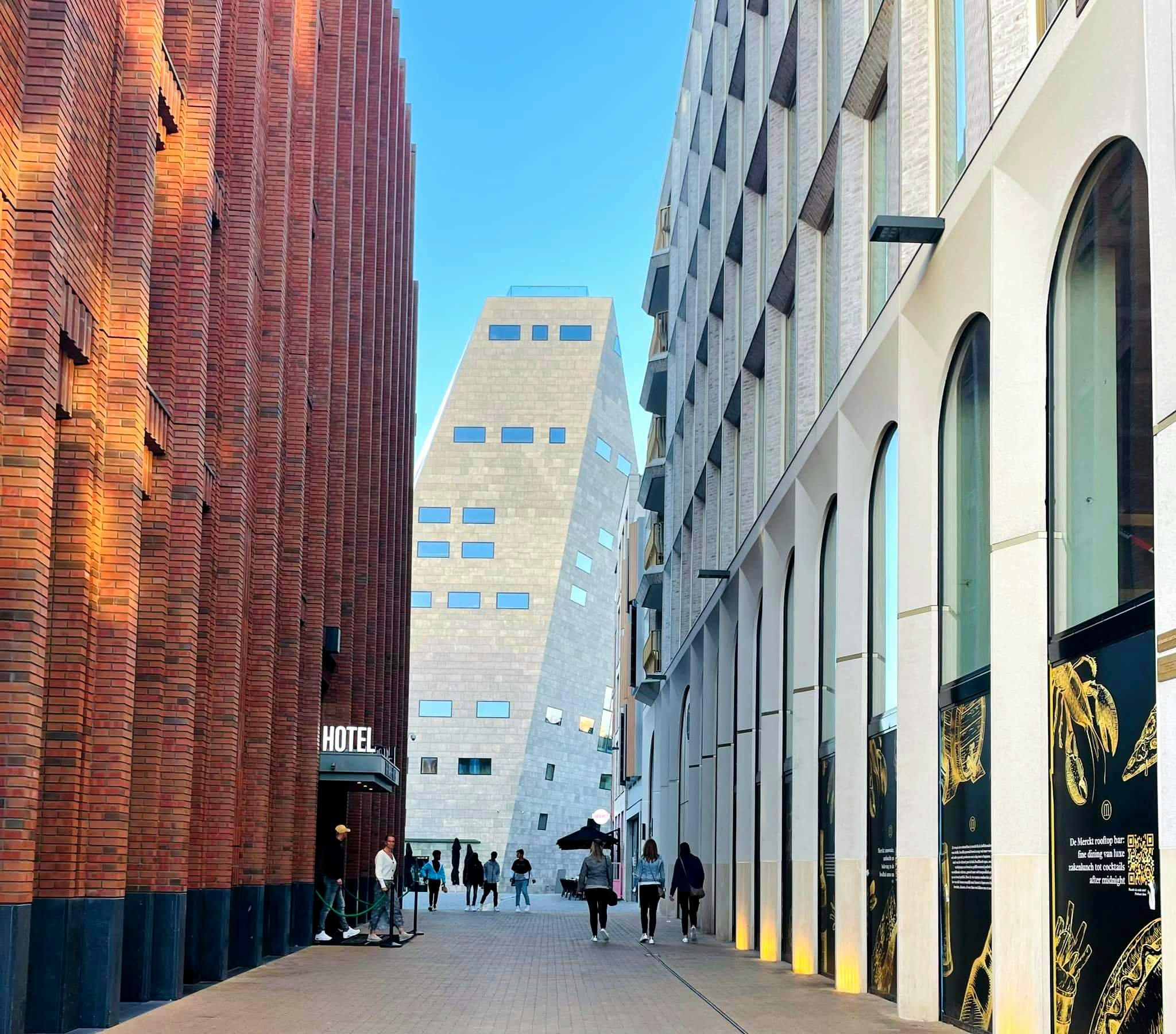
- Forum Groningen

General information
- Status: Completed
- Type: Cultural center
- Location: Nieuwe Markt 1, Groningen, Netherlands
- Coordinates: 53°13′7.70″N 6°34′12.85″E
- Construction started: 31 October 2012
- Opened: 29 November 2019
- Cost: €140 million

Height
- Height: 45 meters (148 feet)

Technical details
- Structural system: Reinforced concrete and steel
- Floor count: 10 + 5 subterranean parking
- Floor area: 17,000 m^{2} (183,000 sq ft)

Design and construction
- Architecture firm: NL Architects Amsterdam
- Main contractor: Royal BAM Construction

Website
- www.forum.nl/en

Forum Groningen is a cultural center in the city of Groningen in the northern Netherlands that houses a library, cinema, musea, study places, rooftop bar a restaurant and many more. Forum Groningen opened in November 2019, and is receiving 2.5 million visitors a year.

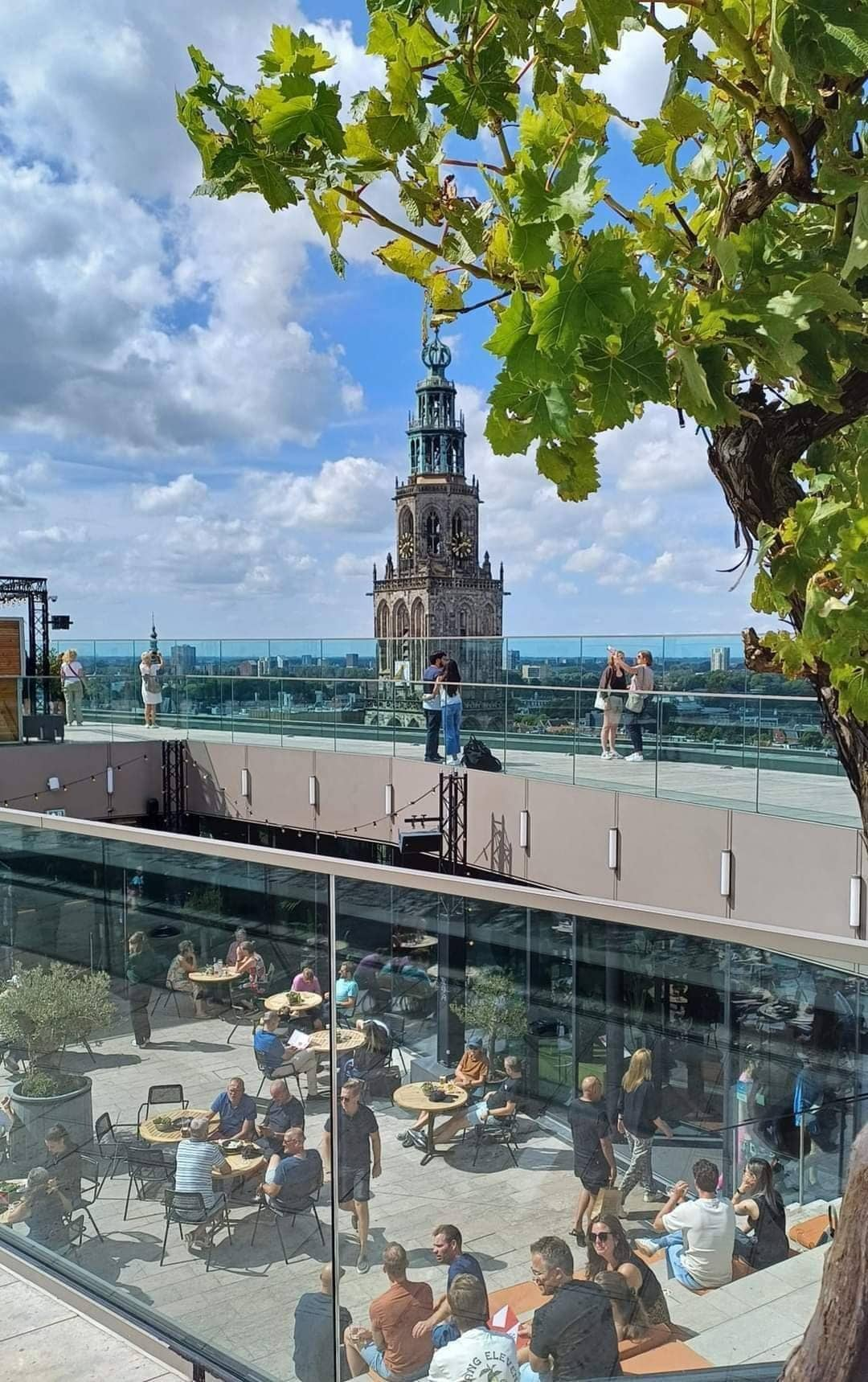
The rooftop is a populair attraction

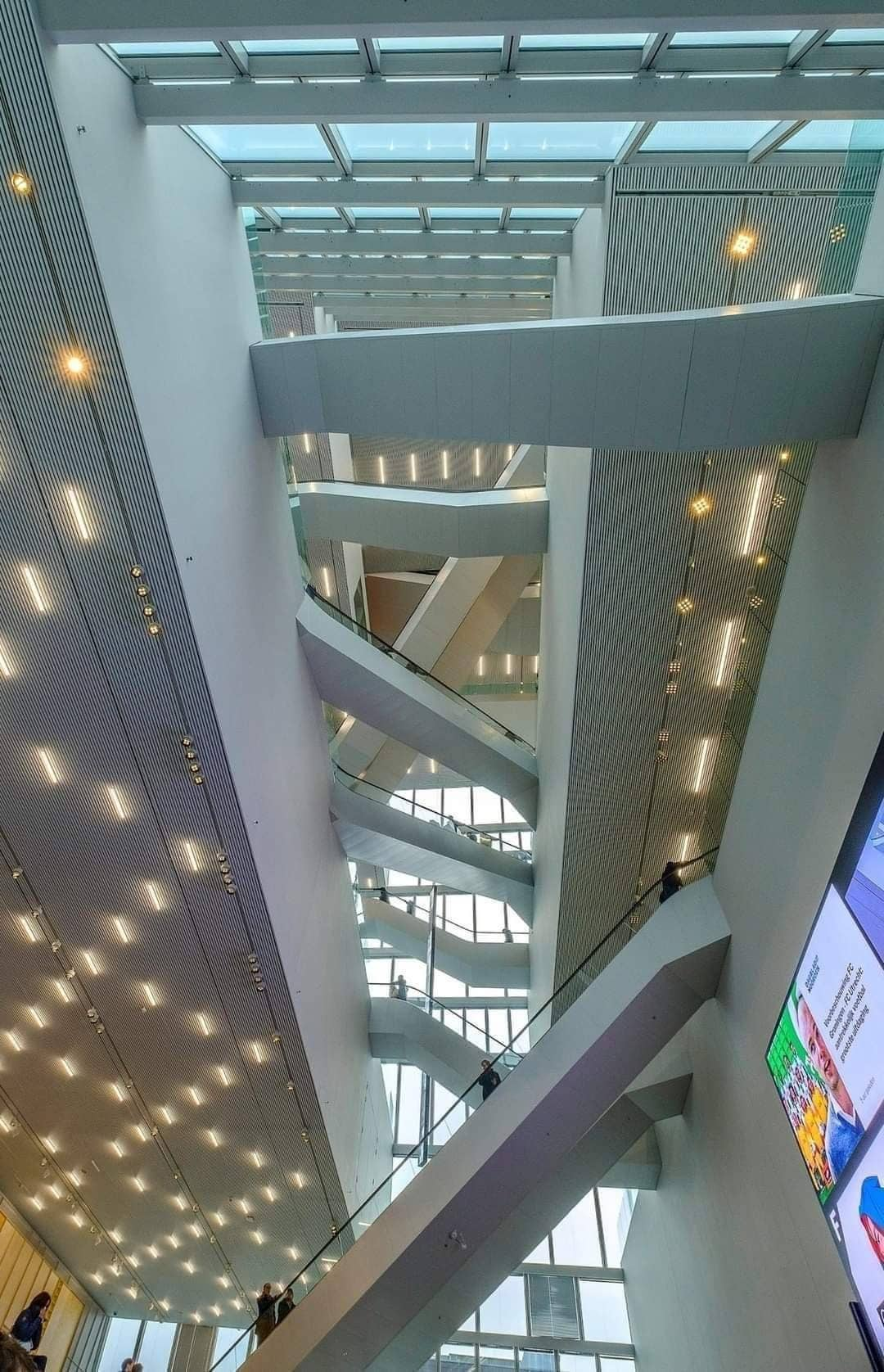
Escalators take you through the building

The center is located next to the Grote Markt Square and the Nieuwe Markt and was part of a larger reconstruction plan in the city center.

== History ==
=== Planning ===
The eastern side of Groningen's Great Market Square was destroyed in World War II. It has subsequently been rebuilt, but its facade has since lost appeal. Municipal authorities initiated plans for its redevelopment in 2005, but met heavy opposition from the city council. A plebiscite was held on 29 June, inviting inhabitants to weigh in. Although 53% of the votes were favorable, results were voided due to a turnout of only 38.5%.

Architects were invited to enter an architectural design competition, allowing the city's inhabitants to put together a top three out of a total of seven designs, from which the Forum's winning design was chosen by a municipal council.

=== Construction ===
Construction costs were projected to be around €71 million, of which €35 million was paid by the provincial government. Provincial authorities attempted to back out of the project in 2010; threats of legal action led by Jan Terlouw secured its renewed support. Work to demolish the site's original development—a shopping center and a student association building—began in September 2011. The building was slated for completion in 2017, allowing for six years' of construction. However, decades' worth of large-scale drilling in the Groningen gas field has led to an increase in induced earthquakes in the province, whose event count shows an exponential growth in time, and caused a budget overrun and construction to run overdue for two years, as new plans had to be drafted to ensure the building's earthquake-resistance.

The building had its official opening on 29 November 2019.
