= The Little Gangster (2015 film) =

2015 Dutch film

- Theatrical release poster
- Directed by: Arne Toonen
- Screenplay by: Lotte Tabbers
- Based on: De Boskampi's by Marjon Hoffman
- Produced by: Dave Schram; Maarten Kuit
- Starring: Thor Braun; Henry van Loon; René van 't Hof; Meral Polat; Fedja van Huêt; Thijn Brobbel; Maas Bronkhuyzen; Rick Lens; Noël Keulen
- Cinematography: Rutger Storm
- Edited by: Marc Bechtold; Brian Ent
- Production companies: Hazazah Pictures; Shooting Star Filmcompany; Wrap the Gap
- Distributed by: Dutch FilmWorks
- Release dates: 19 April 2015 (Filmfestival Zeeuws-Vlaanderen); 29 April 2015 (Netherlands)
- Country: Netherlands
- Language: Dutch

The Little Gangster (Dutch: De Boskampi's) is a 2015 Dutch film directed by Arne Toonen and Arent Jack.

The film is based on the book De Boskampi's, een legendarische maffiafamilie by Marjon Hoffman.

== Awards ==
The film won the Best Dutch Family Film at the 2015 Cinekid Festival, both the jury prize and the audience prize. The film won the Michel Award at the 2015 Filmfest Hamburg as well as the audience award at the Seoul International Youth Film Festival. The film also won the jury award at Oulu International Children's and Youth Film Festival.

== Cast ==
- Thor Braun as Rikkie
- Henry van Loon as Paul
- Meral Polat as Gina
- René van 't Hof as Fred
- Rick Lens as Roderick
- Thijn Brobbel as Noah
- Noël Keulen as Anton
- Ellen Pieters as Riet
- Loes Haverkort as Wanda
- Lineke Rijxman as Gerda
- Luciano Hiwat as Davie
- Dylan Pijper as Jaap
- Joes Brauers as Menno
- Sep Tamminga as Dirk
- Joop Kasteel as Gio
- Fedja van Huêt as Marco SR
- Maas Bronkhuyzen as Marco JR
- Teun Luijkx as Gymleraar nieuwe school
- Raymond Thiry as Commandant Cornelissen
- Horace Cohen as Rechercheur
