= Birgit Schuurman =

Dutch singer and actress

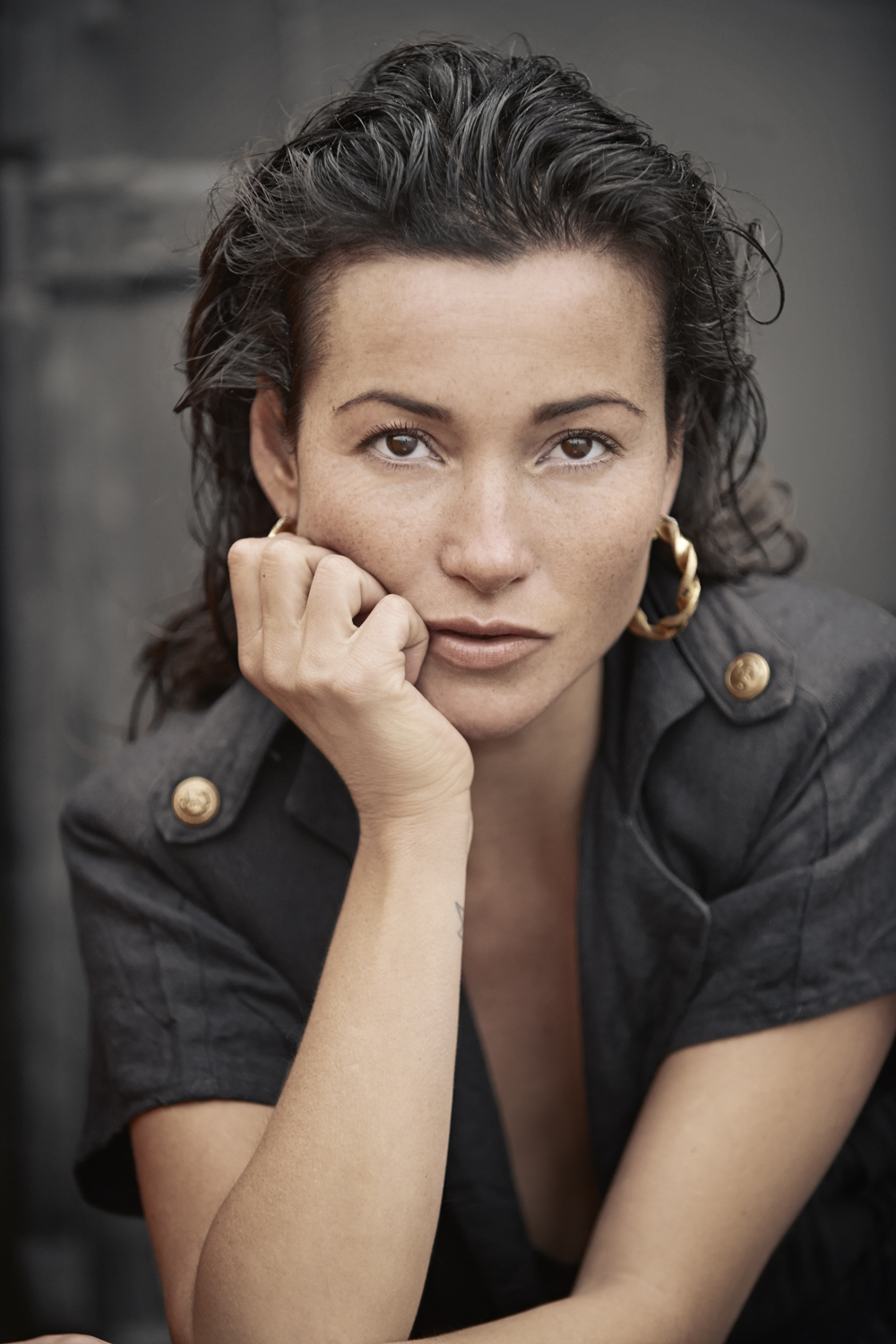

Background information
- Born: Birgit Schuurman; 1 July 1977 (age 49)
- Origin: Utrecht, Netherlands
- Genres: Rock
- Occupations: Singer, actress
- Instrument: Singing
- Years active: 1995-present
- Label: Zip
- Website: www.birgitschuurman.nl

Birgit Schuurman (born 1 July 1977, in Utrecht) is a Dutch singer and actress.

== Biography ==
Schuurman was born in Utrecht and raised in Bunnik as the daughter of a Dutch father and a Surinamese mother. She is the younger sister of Katja Schuurman. Schuurman started her singing career several years before her graduation. Her first attempt to break into the music business was with some unsuccessful R&B and Dance projects. She also sang in the band Jeunes Turcs alongside her older sister Katja in 1995.

After a short break in her musical career, she released some singles in 1999 which were more successful. A Little Famous and Maybe the Wine were minor hits and garnered her a certain degree of fame. Also, in the same year, she featured in the video Onderweg by Abel and started to present a television program on Fox Kids. Her final breakthrough followed in 2001 with her song "I Know", and the corresponding album Few Like Me.

Birgit combined her own dates, including being the supporting act for a Roxy Music show in Ahoy, with a sponsored tour of Lenny Kravitz-tribute-shows. She also appeared as a host on TMF's The Music Factory and had a spread in the Hitkrant. In the same period her record company organized a trip to New York for her and the band Kensington to plant seeds for their musical career in the US market.

Continuing in this direction, 2002 saw her recording a cover-version of the Skunk Anansie-classic Weak for the soundtrack of the movie Liever verliefd; it did not chart.

In September 2003 she signed to a new record label at Purple Eye Entertainment, before releasing her single Everybody Wants to Be; the video was shot on location in Miami.

In July 2002 Birgit married film director Kaja Wolffers. The marriage did not last and the couple divorced in April 2004.

At the end of 2004 Birgit played the magician in the movie-adaptation of the 1969 children's series Floris. Around the same time she performed in the musical De Jantjes playing the role of Toffe Jans. Birgit went on to star in the Lieve Lust series that debuted in August 2005 at the then-launched television station Talpa; both proved to be short-lived.

During this period Birgit released her Sticky Tales-album which was originally scheduled for November 2004; a launch party was held at the Amsterdam Panama. Katja turned up with a few words of praise. "I'm proud of her; she's tough, witty and determined".

In 2006 the sisters became each other's opponent in Katja vs de Rest; Birgit, who feared lifelong embarrassment, emerged as the better half. She also starred in a self-sung coffee-commercial directed by Arne Toonen, her husband to be who also appeared in front of the camera. On 29 June 2009 Birgit Schuurman and Arne Toonen became parents of a son, Chico.

In 2007 Birgit released the USA- only True Stories I Made Up.

=== 2017-2018 ===
12 years after her last album True Stories I Made Up, Birgit was inspired again to write and record new songs. She secretly began work on a new album in 2016. Without any expectations she felt totally free to create. The initial single Fuel my Fire, is the opening track of that album, was released on 27 September 2017.

During the remainder of 2017, Birgit returned to the studio to record the rest of her songs, which appeared on her new album. Her co-writing team consists of Martijn Konijnenburg (Kygo, NinaJune) Marcel Tegelaar (Eefje de Visser), Stef Classens, Tom Tukker and many other songwriter and producers.

Stranded was the second single of the album, released in December of 2017. In the beginning of 2018 Birgit released the third single, the pop track Amplify.

The album A Fool for Love was her most autobiographical record to date. It was released on March 28 in Amsterdam's Melkweg venue.

Meanwhile, Brigit continues to appear in a variety of television-programmes. In 2022, she appeared in The Masked Singer.

She plays a role in the 2024 film De Break-Up Club. She appears in the 2026 season of the television show De Verraders.

== Discography ==
=== Albums ===
| Date | Title |
|---|---|
| 2001 | Few Like Me |
| 2005 | Sticky Tales |
| 2007 | True Stories I Made Up (USA release) |
| 2018 | A Fool for Love |

=== Singles ===
| Date | Title |
|---|---|
| 1999 | "A Little Famous" |
| 1999 | "Maybe the Wine" |
| 2001 | "I Know" |
| 2001 | "Few Like You" |
| 2001 | "Lover" |
| 2002 | "Alright" |
| 2003 | "Weak" |
| 2003 | "Everybody Wants to Be" |
| 2004 | "Control" |
| 2005 | "Hardrocking Diva" |
| 2007 | "Guniang (USA release)" |
| 2017 | "Fuel my Fire" |
| 2017 | "Stranded" |
| 2018 | "Amplify" |

== Selected filmography ==
| Date | Title |
|---|---|
| 2007 | Nadine |
| 2010 | The Dinner Club |
| 2012 | Black Out |
| 2013 | Bros Before Hos |
| 2018 | Redbad |
