= Unabhängiges Filmfest Osnabrück =

Annual film festival held in Osnabrück, Germany

The Unabhängige FilmFest Osnabrück (Osnabrück Independent Film Festival) is one of the eldest and most traditional film festivals in Lower Saxony, Germany. Every year it takes place on five days in October in Osnabrück. It is hosted by the non-profit association Osnabrücker FilmForum e.V. under the direction of Birgit Mueller and Holger Tepe. Patron of the 26. FilmFest was David McAllister, Minister-President of the state of Lower Saxony.

== History and main principles ==
Since its very beginning in 1986 the festival has felt obliged to support committed and innovative filmmaking. Societies and media are changing all the time and so does the FilmFest, taking all of those changes into account. But the core of its activities stays basically the same, as has been rephrased in their 2004 statement: "The basic idea of the FilmFest is to forward tolerance within the society and between nations.

Such tolerance can only be developed by knowing, understanding and dealing with one's own as well as "foreign" points of views and ways of life. In order to promote this process the FilmFest is continually employing the film media with its manifold possibilities in style and expression. In times of increasing globalization it aims at providing points of reference and calling on the individual to recognize the extent of his/her own responsibility and act accordingly.

In 2001 the FilmFest obtained a more sociopolitical direction and hence bears the name "Unabhängiges FilmFest Osnabrück". It cooperates with several organisations and institutions such as terre des hommes.

== Main topics ==
Since year 2006 the FilmFest selects essential topics that serve as the thematical background for the whole festival. This allows, together with the movies, a notable examination with the specific topic and all-embracing discussions.

- 2006: Europäische Konflikte - Europäische Konfliktlösungen (European Conflicts - European Solutions)
- 2007: Grenzgänger (can be translated as "border crossers", someone crossing frontiers)
- 2008: The future is unwritten
- 2009: Glück/fortune
- 2010: Ideal/ideal
- 2011: Unterwegs/on the way

== Sections ==
The FilmFest presents features, documentaries and short films of the following sections:

- Vorsicht Frieden! (in English: Attention, Peace!)
- Generation Zukunft (in English: Future Generation)
- Europe Unlimited
- Vistas Latinas
- Special Programs

The FilmFest awards different endowed prizes:

- Peace Film Award
- Children's Rights Award
- Short Film Award
- Film Prize Ernst Weber
- Film Prize for moral courage

== Competitions ==
=== Competition for the Peace Film Award ===
In this section the FilmFest presents committed and groundbreaking feature films and documentaries that stand up for tolerance and humanity. Issues that as far as the organizers are concerned are being neglected and tend to disappear behind general statements and lip service. This is where the FilmFest comes in, inviting the audience to take part in a discussion about peace and all its implications, reaching from international conflicts to inner-social differences and domestic problems. We aim at filling the notion of peace with tangible contents and at going further than the superficial observation of current, social developments as practiced by the media, in order to inform the audience, to make them more susceptible to these issues and to make them question their own set of behavior. During the selection process and the compilation of the program the team does not only judge by formal standards, but also puts great emphasis on the thematic compatibility of the films and their potential to enrich each other.

The films are in competition for the Osnabrück Peace Film Award that will be awarded by a jury of experts that consists of three representatives of the film industry.

Award recipients since 2002:

- 2002: In Or Between, Germany 2002, dir.: Wuppertaler Medienprojekt
- 2003: Rachida, Algeria–France 2003, dir.: Yamina Bachir Chouikh
- 2005: Auf der Schwelle des großen Vergessens, Netherlands 2004, dir.:Thom Verheul
- 2006: Rwanda, les collines parlent, Belgium 2005, dir.: Bernard Bellefroid
- 2007: Kurz davor ist es passiert, Austria 2006, dir.: Anja Salomonowitz
- 2008: shahida - Brides of Allah, Israel 2008, dir.: Natalie Assouline
- 2009: Welcome, France 2009, dir.: Philippe Lioret
- 2010: Les Arrivants, France, dir.: Claudine Bories and Patrice Chagnard
- 2011: Vaterlandsverräter, Germany 2011, dir.: Annkatrin Hendel

=== Competition for the Children's Rights Award ===
The programme presents four films that deal in an outstanding and committed fashion with the situation and rights of children all over the world. The subject matters of these films are the social, economical and cultural living conditions of children in the developing countries as well as in the industrialized countries which are being conveyed in an informative and gripping way. They cover the realization of the basic rights to education, health care and shelter as well as protection against exploitation and violence and the children's claim to information, freedom of speech and the representation of their interests. The subjects of the section Children's Rights Issues closely follow the UN Convention for Children's Rights that has been signed by 191 states.

In this section the Children's Rights Award is bestowed by a school children's jury consisting of five pupils from eighth grade.

Award recipients since 2001:

- 2001: Ali Zaoua, France–Belgium–Marokko 2000, dir.: Nabil Ayouch
- 2002: Runaway, Great Britain 2002, dir.: Kim Longinotto and Ziba Mir-Hosseini
- 2003: Child Soldiers, Australia–Great Britain 2002, dir.: Alan Lindsay
- 2004: Paloma de Papel, Peru 2004, dir.: Fabrizio Aquilar
- 2005: Schidkröten können fliegen, Iran–Iraq 2004, dir.: Bahman Ghobadi
- 2006: Living Rights: Roy & Toti, Netherlands 2005, dir.: Duco Tellegen
- 2007: Mama mir geht es gut, Germany 2007, dir.: Alexandra Westmeier
- 2008: Klassenkampf, Germany 2008, dir.: Uli Kick
- 2009: Lena, Stella, Ümmü und die Anderen, Germany 2009, dir.: Betty Schiel
- 2010: Ich, Tomek, Poland dir.: Robert Glinski
- 2011: Peqeñas Voces, Colombia, Regie: Jairo Carrillo

=== Competition for the Short Film Award ===
Short films leave a lot of freedom to the filmmakers, but at the same time compel them to articulate their ideas in a very precise manner. The FilmFest supports young talents and closely collaborates with numerous film academies. Short films are also presented as supporting films that correspond with the feature film's subject matter or provide contrasting statements.

In this section the prize is awarded by the audience.

Award recipients since 2001:

- 2001: Modern Daydreams, USA 2001, dir.: Mitchell Rose
- 2002: Der Schwarzarbeiter, Germany 2002, dir.: Gülsel Özkan & Ludger Pfanz
- 2003: Tripper, Germany 2003, dir.: Kira Schimmelpfennig
- 2004: Meine Eltern, Germany 2004, dir.: Nele Vollmar
- 2005: Goodbye, Germany, 2004, Steve Hudson
- 2006: Vincent, Italy–Germany 2005, dir.: Giulio Ricciarelli
- 2007: Achterbahn, Germany 2007, dir.: Frank Wegerhoff
- 2008: Antje und wir, Germany 2007, dir.: Felix Stienz
- 2009: Der Anner im Himmel, Germany 2009, dir.:: Philipp Hartmann Flumen Film
- 2010: Drop Dead, Netherlands 2010, dir.: Arne Toonen
- 2011: Matar a un Niño, Spain 2011, Regie: César Esteban Alenda und José Esteban Alenda

=== Film prize Ernst Weber ===
The film prize Ernst Weber for solidarity and social cohesion is being lent to a film which gives thought-provoking impulses or visions for the participation of all people in the society, regardless to their national or social origin. The prize takes Ernst Weber’s commitment as an example: the engagement for a collaborative living that overcomes boundaries and centres the solidarity between people. The film prize is endowed with €1000.

Award recipients:

- 2010: "La Pivellina", Italy/Austria 2009, dir.: Rainer Frimmels and Tizza Covis
- 2011: Morgen, Romania 2010, dir.: Marian Crisan

=== Prize for moral courage ===
The film prize for moral courage, amounting to €1000, is being awarded by the district of Osnabrück and is being given to a short film which points out the importance of moral courage in society in a particular way. Pupils attending the secondary school or a professional school in the district of Osnabrück can apply for being a part of the jury.

Award recipients:

- 2010 Uwe und Uwe, dir.: Lena Liberta
- 2011Dip, Great Britain 2010, dir.: Lisa Gornick

== Europe Unlimited ==
The FilmFest supports the cultural convergence of the European countries and aims at critically accompanying this process with all its political, economical and social implications. It goes beyond conventional views and deals with specific aspects of the European unification. It is concerned with everyday life and problems in Eastern and Western Europe and looks for differences and common interests. It tracks down breaks, approaches faults and detects frontiers. In this area of tension filmmaking takes on the crucial part of mediator between the "old and the new Europeans". Currently in this section there is no award given.

== Vistas Latinas ==
Since 2009 the FilmFest dedicates a part of its programme to Latin America. Against the background of noteworthy political, social and economic transformations the contemporary Latin American film presents itself aesthetically ambitious and deals with current social and cultural developments. Especially this decisive mixture explains the interest of the sociopolitically committed Osnabrücker FilmFest in the Latin American film. By now this section is non-competitive.

== Special programs ==
Before and meanwhile the FilmFest takes place there are other events related to film organized by the FilmForum. A few examples are:

- the guided tour A Wall is a Screen, where short films are shown on public buildings on a walkabout through the city
- the "Heimliche Kino" ("Secret Cinema") where movies are shown in private living rooms for a small audience
- concerts that play along to silent films

== Venues ==
The FilmFest takes place every year in three specific places:

- Cinema-Arthouse Osnabrück
- Haus der Jugend Osnabrück
- Lagerhalle Osnabrück

Due to the special programs the team organizes throughout the whole year the number of venues in Osnabrück and its surrounding area rises permanently.
