= Tim Griek =

Dutch musician and producer (1944–1988)

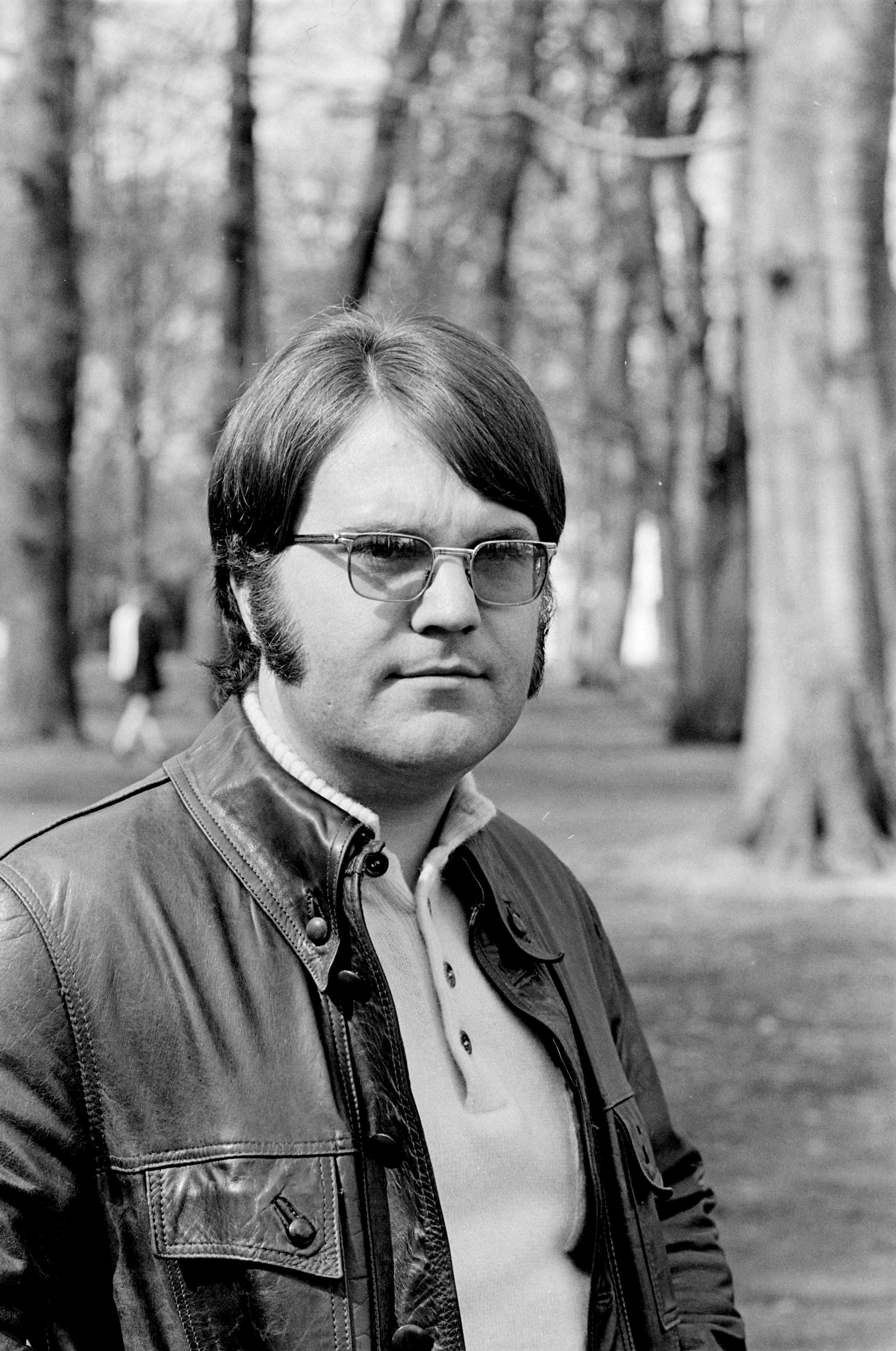
- Tim Griek, 1970
- Born: Thiemen Griek; August 3, 1944; Haarlem, Kingdom of the Netherlands
- Died: 13 February 1988 (aged 43); Ursem, Netherlands
- Known for: The Jokers; Music producer

Tim Griek (3 August 1944 – 13 February 1988) was a Dutch musician and producer.

Griek played percussion in the Dutch music group The Jokers, in 1967 renamed to Ekseption. He left the group in 1968 to become a music producer. Some of the artists he represented were Dimitri van Toren, Jan Akkerman, Brainbox, Elly en Rikkert and André Hazes.

In 1988 Griek drove his car by accident into a river and drowned. André Hazes, who was a good friend of Griek, composed the song "Bedankt mijn vriend" ("Thanks to my friend") as a tribute.

== Trivia ==
- In the 2012 musical Hij Gelooft in Mij (He believes in me), which is about the life of André Hazes, the role of Griek is performed by Cees Geel and Rutger de Bekker (alternating).
- In the 2015 movie Bloed, zweet & tranen, the role of Griek is played by Fedja van Huêt.
