= Raymond Thiry =

Dutch actor (born 1959)

- Born: 29 September 1959 (age 66); Amsterdam, Netherlands
- Occupation: Actor
- Years active: 1994–present

Raymond Thiry (born 29 September 1959) is a Dutch actor. He has appeared in more than eighty films since 1994.

== Filmography ==
Year	Title	Role	Notes
2008	De Brief voor de Koning		
2008	Winter in Wartime		
2012	Black Out		
2013	Bros Before Hos		
2015	The Paradise Suite	Maarten	
2015	Bloed, zweet & tranen		
2015	The Little Gangster	Commandant Cornelissen	
2018	My Foolish Heart	Simon	
2018	Undercover	John Zwart	
2020	Quo Vadis, Aida?	Major Rob Franken	
2026	Crooks	Kees	

== Prizes ==
- 2015 – ShortCutz Amsterdam Annual Award, Best Actor for A MAN FALLS FROM THE SKY
