= Edmond Classen =

Dutch actor (1938–2014)

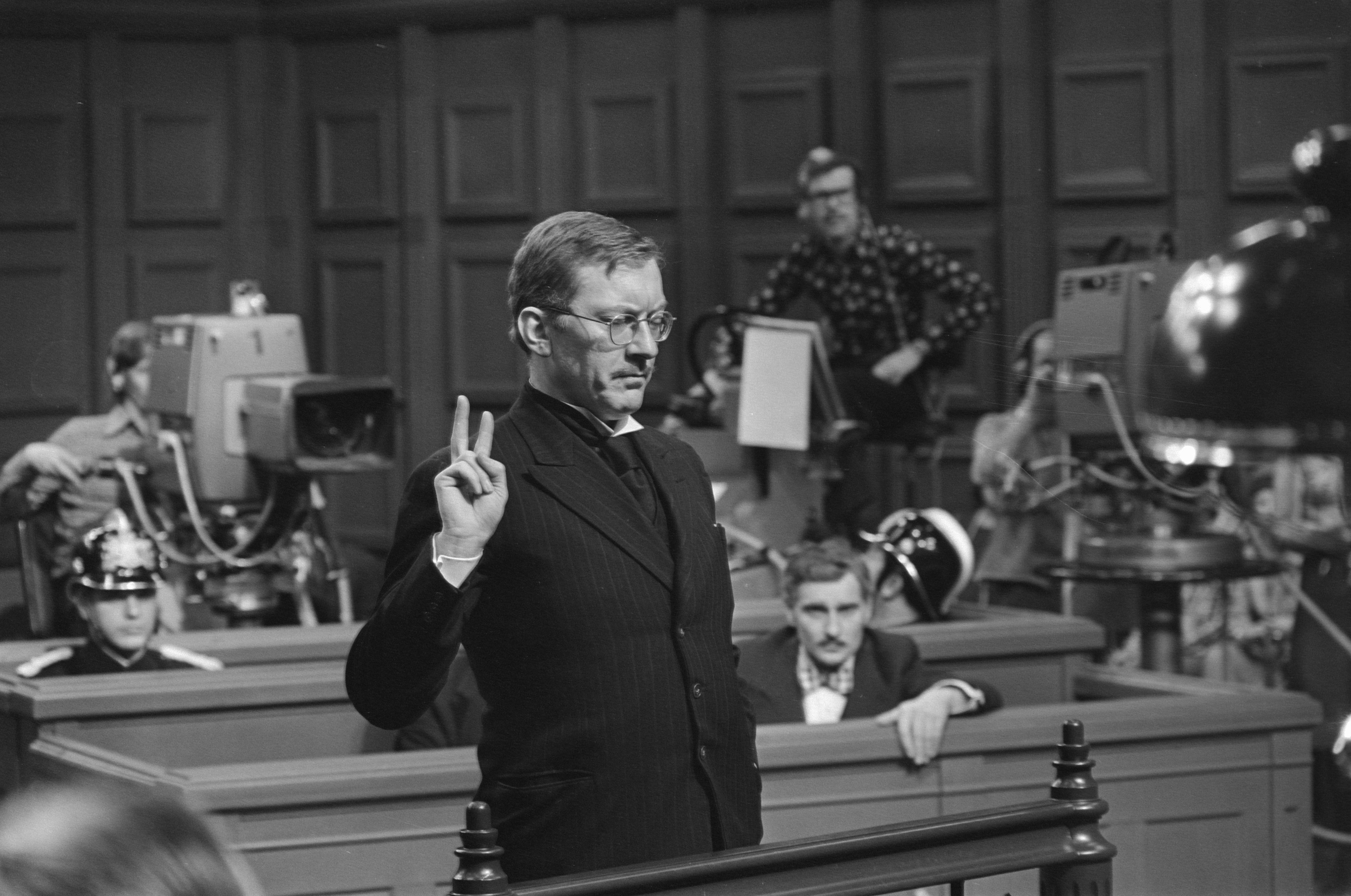
- Classen in 1976
- Born: Edmond Alphons Antoine Marie Classen; 16 May 1938; Arnhem, Netherlands
- Died: 27 January 2014 (aged 75); Arnhem, Netherlands
- Occupation: Actor
- Years active: 1963-2012

Edmond Classen (16 May 1938 – 27 January 2014) was a Dutch actor. He appeared in 49 films and television shows between 1963 and 2012.

== Filmography ==
- Black Out (2012)
- Flikken Maastricht (2011) TV-series (Episode Ontspoord)
- Grijpstra & De Gier (2006) TV-series (Episode Eenzame hoogte)
- Sinterklaas en het Gevaar in de Vallei (2003)
- Bergen Binnen (2003) TV-series (Episode De verhuizing en het afscheid)
- Oppassen!!! (1994) TV-series (Episode Goed van vertrouwen)
- Lijmen/Het Been (2000)
- Toen was geluk heel gewoon (2000) TV-series
- Flodder (1993-1999) TV-series (12 episodes)
- SamSam (1997) TV-series (Episode Undercover met koffer)
- 12 steden, 13 ongelukken (1997) TV-series (Episode Spiegelbeeld (Hoofddorp))
- Flodder 3 (1995)
- Het Zonnetje in Huis (1994-1996) TV-series
- Coverstory (1993) TV-series (Episode 1.6)
- Ha, die Pa! Episode Plastic droomwereld (1991)
- Goede tijden, slechte tijden (1990) TV-series
- Ava & Gabriel: A Love Story (1990)
- Vrienden voor het leven (1991-1993) TV-series
- Trouble in Paradise (1989)
- Spijkerhoek (1989-1993) TV-series (26 episodes)
- Rust roest (1989) TV-series
- Medisch Centrum West (1988)
- Kop in de wind (1987) TV-film
- Op hoop van zegen (1986)
- Armoede TV-series (1982)
- Come-Back! (1981)
- Doodzonde (1978)
- Amsterdam 700 (1975) Mini-series
