= Brimstone (2016 film) =

2016 film by Martin Koolhoven

- Theatrical release poster
- Directed by: Martin Koolhoven
- Written by: Martin Koolhoven
- Produced by: Els Vandevorst; Uwe Schott
- Starring: Dakota Fanning; Guy Pearce; Emilia Jones; Kit Harington; Carice van Houten
- Cinematography: Rogier Stoffers
- Edited by: Job ter Burg
- Music by: Tom Holkenborg
- Production companies: N279 Entertainment; X-Filme; Backup Media; Filmwave; Prime Time; The Jokers Films
- Distributed by: Paradiso Entertainment (Netherlands); The Jokers (France); Thunderbird Releasing (United Kingdom)
- Release dates: 3 September 2016 (Venice); 12 January 2017 (Netherlands); 10 March 2017 (United States)
- Running time: 148 minutes
- Countries: Netherlands; France; Germany; Sweden; United Kingdom; United States
- Language: English
- Box office: $2.1 million

Brimstone is a 2016 psychological Western film written and directed by Martin Koolhoven. The film stars Dakota Fanning, Guy Pearce, Emilia Jones, Kit Harington, and Carice van Houten. It is a Dutch-American as well as French, German, Belgian and Swedish international production.

The film was selected to compete for the Golden Lion at the 73rd Venice International Film Festival on 3 September 2016, where it caused controversy. It premiered in the Netherlands on 12 January 2017, where it was very well received, as in the rest of Europe and was released on 10 March in the United States, where it received mixed reviews from critics.

== Plot ==
Narrative acts
- 1. Revelation
- 2. Exodus
- 3. Genesis
- 4. Retribution

The plot consists of four acts, which are presented in anachronic order. The chronological order is Acts 3 (Genesis), 2 (Exodus), 1 (Revelation), and 4 (Retribution). So, after the first act, Revelation, the following acts are what happened before and the fourth act is chronologically the last.

1. Revelation
Elizabeth "Liz" Brundy lives in the Old West with her husband Eli and their two children: Matthew, Eli's son from a previous marriage, and daughter Samantha, called Sam.

Liz works as a midwife who can hear but is mute, and so communicates through sign language. One day, a new Preacher, known as "The Reverend", hosts a session at the local church, and the moment that Liz hears his voice, she seems to recognize him and is terrified by his appearance. Later that day, Liz is forced to choose between delivering a baby safely or saving its mother; she chooses to euthanise the baby and save the mother, without telling her until after the procedure is finished. Afterwards, Nathan, the husband of the formerly-pregnant woman, blames Liz. That night, Nathan drunkenly shows up at Eli and Liz's house, violent and threatening; Nathan claims Liz is responsible for his son's death. In the middle of the fight, the Reverend shows up and tells him to leave. He then goes into Eli's house and has a mysterious talk with Liz, saying she is guilty of the murder of Nathan's son and must be "punished". As Eli overhears some of the conversation, the Reverend leaves the house. Eli's sheep are found dead the next morning, and he seeks out Nathan, who has since disappeared. Liz later sneaks off at night to murder the Reverend, but finds her daughter's doll in the Reverend's bed instead. Meanwhile, the Reverend disembowels Eli, and leaves him to die. As he succumbs to his wounds, Eli tells Matthew to take the family up into the mountains to his father, before the boy mercy kills him. Liz and the children flee the farm.

2. Exodus
A young girl named Joanna, walking through the desert, is picked up and nursed by a traveling Chinese family. In the mining town of Bismuth, Joanna is sold to a brothel owned by Frank. She is protected by Sally, a prostitute, until Sally is hanged for shooting a violent customer; another prostitute, Elizabeth, then protects Joanna in the aftermath of Sally's hanging. However, when Elizabeth bites the tongue of an abusive customer, her tongue is cut off as punishment. Joanna teaches Elizabeth sign language from a book the doctor gave her. Elizabeth plans to sneak out of Bismuth to start a new life, and arranges through a marriage broker to marry Eli. The Reverend comes to the brothel, recognizes Joanna, and proceeds to violently attack her. Elizabeth tries to save Joanna but is murdered by the Reverend with Joanna slashing his throat in retaliation. She runs away, cutting off her own tongue and taking Elizabeth's place with Eli.

3. Genesis
In the desert, two badly wounded men, Samuel and Wolf, are the last survivors in a dispute over gold that has left several other men dead. They depart on a single horse.

Joanna lives with her mother, Anna, and father, revealed to be the Reverend himself. He is strictly religious and is often cruel and abusive towards his family. Samuel and Wolf collapse at the farm and Joanna secretly cares for them. Anna confronts the Reverend when she realizes he lusts after their daughter, so he beats and humiliates her by placing a scold's bridle on her head. In response, Anna commits suicide in full view of the church congregation. The next day the Reverend takes Joanna to church and starts to perform a wedding ceremony between himself and his daughter. Samuel tries to rescue her, but the Reverend murders him. Her father whips Joanna and rapes her. In the morning she runs off.

4. Retribution
Matthew is shot by the Reverend as he follows Liz to her father-in-law's place in the mountains. He murders her father-in-law and tells Liz he will beat and rape her daughter, but Liz murders him instead. Sometime later, after Liz has turned Eli's place into a sawmill, Nathan arrives to arrest her. The Reverend had sent him to Bismuth where he became a deputy and then sheriff. Having found a wanted poster of Elizabeth Brundy (the woman without a tongue who killed Frank before she saved Liz/Joanna), Nathan has come to arrest her (Liz). As Nathan is escorting her onto a ferry, with a last look at her daughter playing on the shore, Liz throws herself in the lake and drowns. Her daughter Sam, now a grown woman with a child of her own, remembers her well.

== Cast ==
- Guy Pearce as The Reverend
- Dakota Fanning as Liz
- Emilia Jones as Joanna
- Carice van Houten as Anna
- Kit Harington as Samuel
- Paul Anderson as Frank
- William Houston as Eli
- Charlotte Croft as Abigail
- Ivy George as Sam
- Bill Tangradi as Nathan
- Jack Roth as Wolf
- Jack Hollington as Matthew
- Carla Juri as Elizabeth Brundy
- Vera Vitali as Sally
- Naomi Battrick as older Sam
- Hon Ping Tang as Meng
- Frederick Schmidt as Sheriff Zeke
- Adrian Sparks as Eli's Father
- Ad van Kempen as Arie
- Joseph Kennedy as the husband of the pregnant woman
- Martha Mackintosh as the pregnant woman

== Production ==
On 5 February 2015, Guy Pearce and Mia Wasikowska were the first to be announced as part of the cast of the film. Later, Robert Pattinson came on board to portray an outlaw along with Carice van Houten.

In May 2015, Koolhoven confirmed that Jack Roth had joined the cast of the film. In June 2015, The Hollywood Reporter confirmed that Dakota Fanning and Kit Harington had replaced Wasikowska and Pattinson in the film, respectively. In 2017, Pattinson said he regretted not doing Brimstone and called it "his own stupid fault".

Principal photography began from 15 June 2015, and took place in Germany, Hungary, Austria and Spain.

== Release ==
Brimstone's first commercial release was in The Netherlands on 12 January 2017, becoming Martin Koolhoven's fifth consecutive hit film. The film was also released on 10 March 2017, in selected theaters and video on demand in the United States. It was sold to more than 80 countries in the world, making it the best-sold Dutch movie ever.

=== Festival screenings ===
Brimstone was shown in competition at the Venice Film Festival. After Venice, the film had its North American premiere as a Special Presentation at the Toronto International Film Festival where it received positive reviews. as it later did in other festivals like the Sitges Film Festival.

== Reception ==
=== Box office ===
While the estimated production budget stood at $12 million, the film generated only $2.1 million in global box office revenue.

=== Critical response ===
In The Netherlands, the film received generally positive reviews from critics and opened strongly. The readers of True West Magazine chose the movie as Best Foreign Western Movie. Koolhoven won the Golden Pen for the screenplay and the Golden Film for the film. On 29 September 2017, Brimstone won six Golden Calves (often called "The Dutch Oscars") at the Netherlands Film Festival, breaking the old record of four.

On review aggregation website Rotten Tomatoes, the film has a rating of 45% based on 76 reviews and the average rating is 4.90/10. On Metacritic, the film has a score of 45 based on 17 reviews, indicating "mixed or average" reviews. While The Independent wrote "Brimstone is raw and very powerful filmmaking, a movie that can't help but get under your skin", Variety wrote it was "highfalutin exploitation", blaming it on the Netherlands, writing, "It is, after all, a country that ever since the 1960s, especially in Amsterdam, has profferred a more liberal view than almost any other place of what might euphemistically be termed 'youthful sexuality'." Glenn Kenny of RogerEbert.com referred to the film as "dimwitted, amoral exploitation" and accused Koolhoven of identifying most with the murderous and incestuous Reverend. Kevin Maher of The Times UK called it "an exploitation western that veers from self-importance to high camp."

Brimstone was released in the United Kingdom on 29 September 2017, and was well received by the British press. Empire gave it four stars and called it "white-knuckle tense", and Peter Bradshaw wrote in The Guardian: "This epically long, lurid, violent western from Dutch film-maker Martin Koolhoven has a kind of Tarantino-ish prolixity and narrative ingenuity. Despite its very indulgent length, it never bores."

=== Awards ===
- Nominated – Golden Lion, Venice Film Festival
- Winner – Golden Film
- Winner – Golden Pen, Martin Koolhoven
- Nominated – Best Film in the Official Competition, London Film Festival
- Nominated – PFS Award (Human Rights), Political Film Society
- Nominated – Audience Award (Best Narrative Feature), Palm Springs International Film Festival
- Winner – Best Foreign Western Movie chosen by the readers of True West Magazine
- Winner – Ensor Award, Beste Co-productie at the Ostend Film Festival
- Nominated – Golden Calf, Carice van Houten, Best Actress in a supporting Role, Netherlands Film Festival
- Nominated – Golden Calf, Job ter Burg, Best Editing, Netherlands Film Festival
- Nominated – Golden Calf, Martin Koolhoven, Best Screenplay, Netherlands Film Festival
- Winner – Golden Calf, Floris Vos, Best Production Design, Netherlands Film Festival
- Winner – Golden Calf, Tom Holkenborg, Best Music, Netherlands Film Festival
- Winner – Golden Calf, Herman Pieëte, Best Sound Design, Netherlands Film Festival
- Winner – Golden Calf, Rogier Stoffers, Best Director of Photography, Netherlands Film Festival
- Winner – Golden Calf, Martin Koolhoven, Best Direction, Netherlands Film Festival
- Winner – Golden Calf, Els Vandevorst, Best Film, Netherlands Film Festival
- Nominated – Best Feature Length Film, Official Fantastic Competition, Sitges Film Festival
- Nominated – Best Film, International Ecumenical Award, Jameson CineFest – Miskolc International Film Festival
- Nominated – Golden Frog, Rogier Stoffers, The International Film Festival of the Art of Cinematography Camerimage
- Winner – European Film Award, Leendert van Nimwegen, European Hair & Makeup Artist, European Film Academy
- Winner – Beste Dutch Film 2017, Circle of Dutch Film Journalists (KNF)
- Nominated – Zilveren Krulstaart, Martin Koolhoven, Best Feature, Screenplay Award
- Winner – DirectorsNL Award, Martin Koolhoven, Best Feature, Director's Award given by DDG and Vevam Members
- Nominated – Saturn Award for Best International Film
- Winner – Best Feature, Almeria Western Film Festival
