= Kamperveen =

- Village
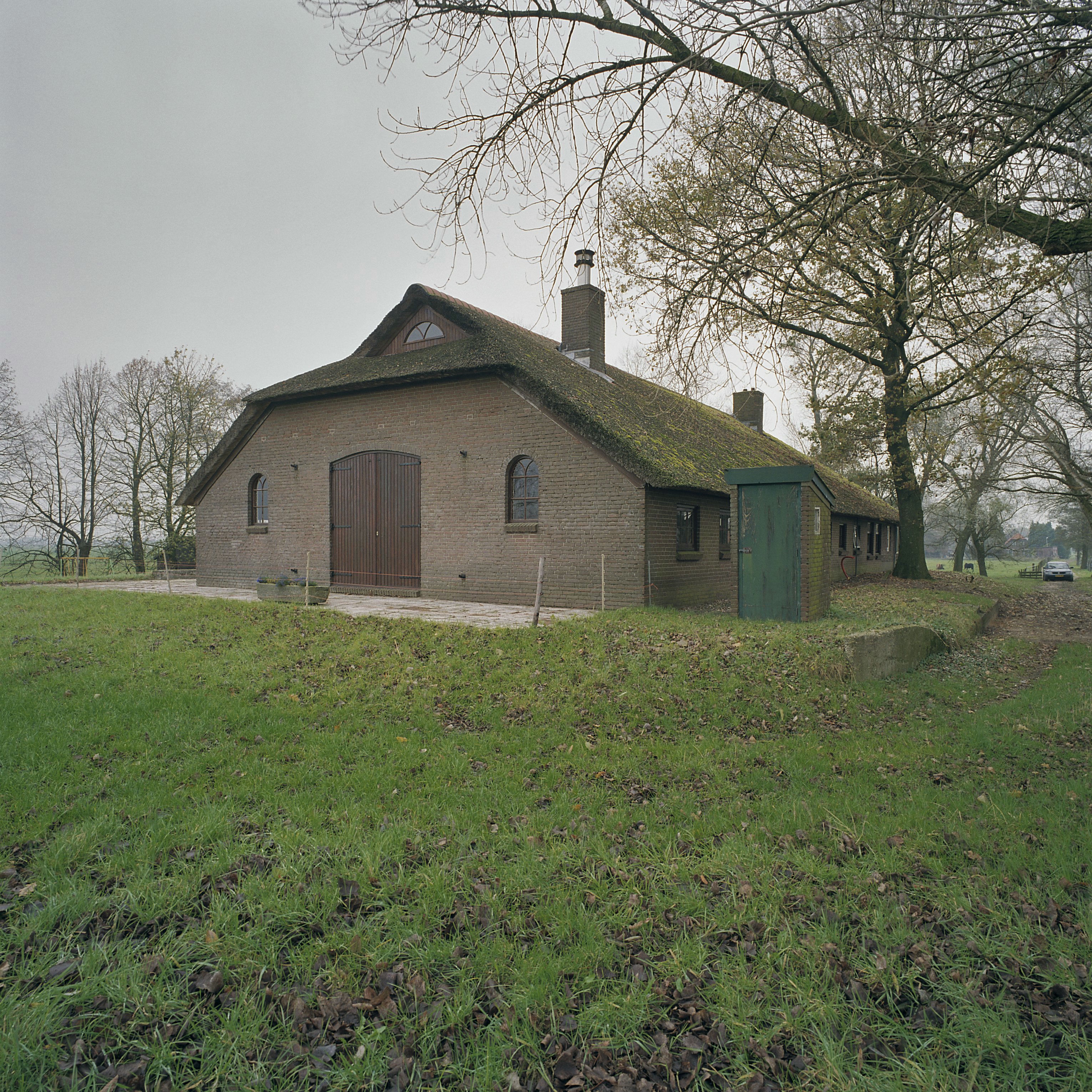
- Farm in Kamperveen

- Coat of arms

- Location in the Netherlands Kamperveen (Netherlands)
- Coordinates: 52.5107°N 5.9266°E
- Country: Netherlands
- Province: Overijssel
- Municipality: Kampen

Area
  - Total: 21.93 km^{2} (8.47 sq mi)
- Elevation: 2 m (6.6 ft)

Population (2021)
  - Total: 915
  - Density: 41.7/km^{2} (108/sq mi)
- Time zone: UTC+1 (CET)
  - Summer (DST): UTC+2 (CEST)
- Postal code: 8278
- Dialing code: 038

Kamperveen is a village in the Dutch province of Overijssel. It is located in the municipality of Kampen, about 5 km south of the city.

Kamperveen was a separate municipality until 1937, when it became a part of IJsselmuiden.

== History ==
It was first mentioned in 1236 as "in Veno prope Campen", meaning "the bog of Kampen", and was originally a peat colony.

Kamperveen is a confusing village, because it is a merger of the hamlets De Heuvels, De Roskam, De Zande, Hogeweg, Posthoorn and Zuideinde, therefore, it does not have a clear centre. There are directional signs to Kamperveen, however each hamlet is marked with its own name.

== Notable people ==
- Jan Terlouw (born 1931), politician and author
