= Winter in Wartime (film) =

- Theatrical release poster
- Directed by: Martin Koolhoven
- Written by: Mieke de Jong; Martin Koolhoven; Paul Jan Nelissen
- Based on: Winter in Wartime by Jan Terlouw
- Produced by: San Fu Maltha; Els Vandevorst
- Starring: Martijn Lakemeier; Yorick van Wageningen; Jamie Campbell Bower
- Cinematography: Guido van Gennep
- Edited by: Job ter Burg
- Music by: Pino Donaggio
- Distributed by: Benelux Film Distributors
- Release dates: 17 November 2008 (Amsterdam premiere); 27 November 2008 (Netherlands)
- Running time: 103 minutes
- Country: Netherlands
- Languages: Dutch; German; English
- Budget: €4 million
- Box office: $9.2 million

Winter in Wartime (Dutch: Oorlogswinter) is a 2008 Dutch war film directed by Martin Koolhoven, from a script he co-wrote with Mieke de Jong and Paul Jan Nelissen, based on Jan Terlouw's eponymous 1972 novel.

The film was hugely successful in the Netherlands, out-grossing competing films like Twilight and The Dark Knight. Additionally, it was the highest-grossing film in the Netherlands during Christmas 2008 and the first weeks of 2009. The film was chosen by the Dutch Critics as the best Dutch film of 2008; it won the PZC Audience Award (best movie based on a novel), three Rembrandt Awards, and three Golden Calf awards. Also, it was chosen as Best Film by the Young Jury (14–18 years) at the Rome Film Festival and was shortlisted (with eight other movies) at the Academy Awards, in the section Best Foreign Language Film.

It was released in the United States by Sony Pictures Classics on 18 March 2011.

== Plot ==
A teenage Dutch boy, named Michiel van Beusekom, tries to assist the Dutch resistance during World War II by helping a British airman stay out of German hands during the Nazi occupation of the Netherlands.

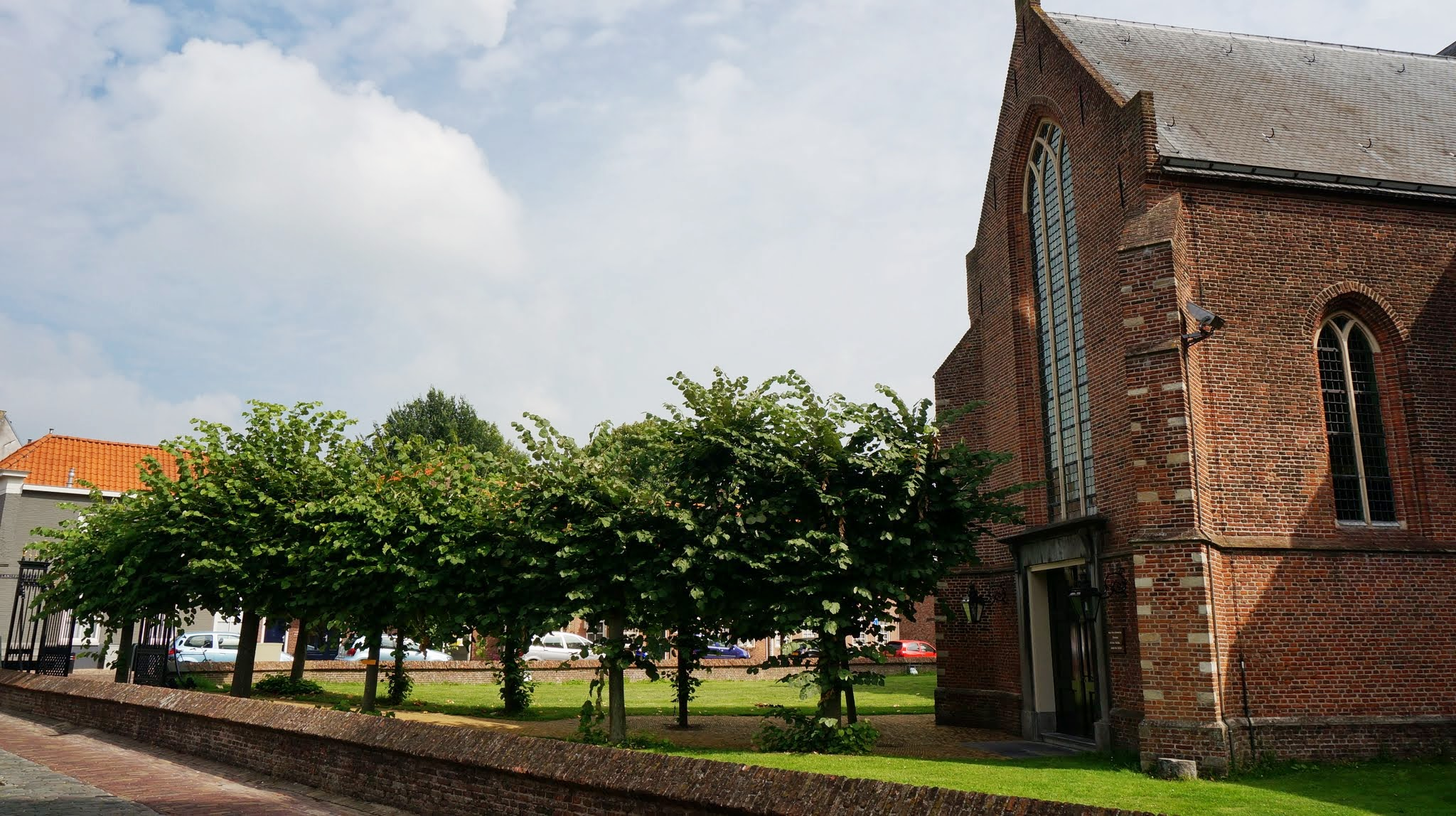
The area around the Martinuskerk in Woudrichem was used for many scenes of the film

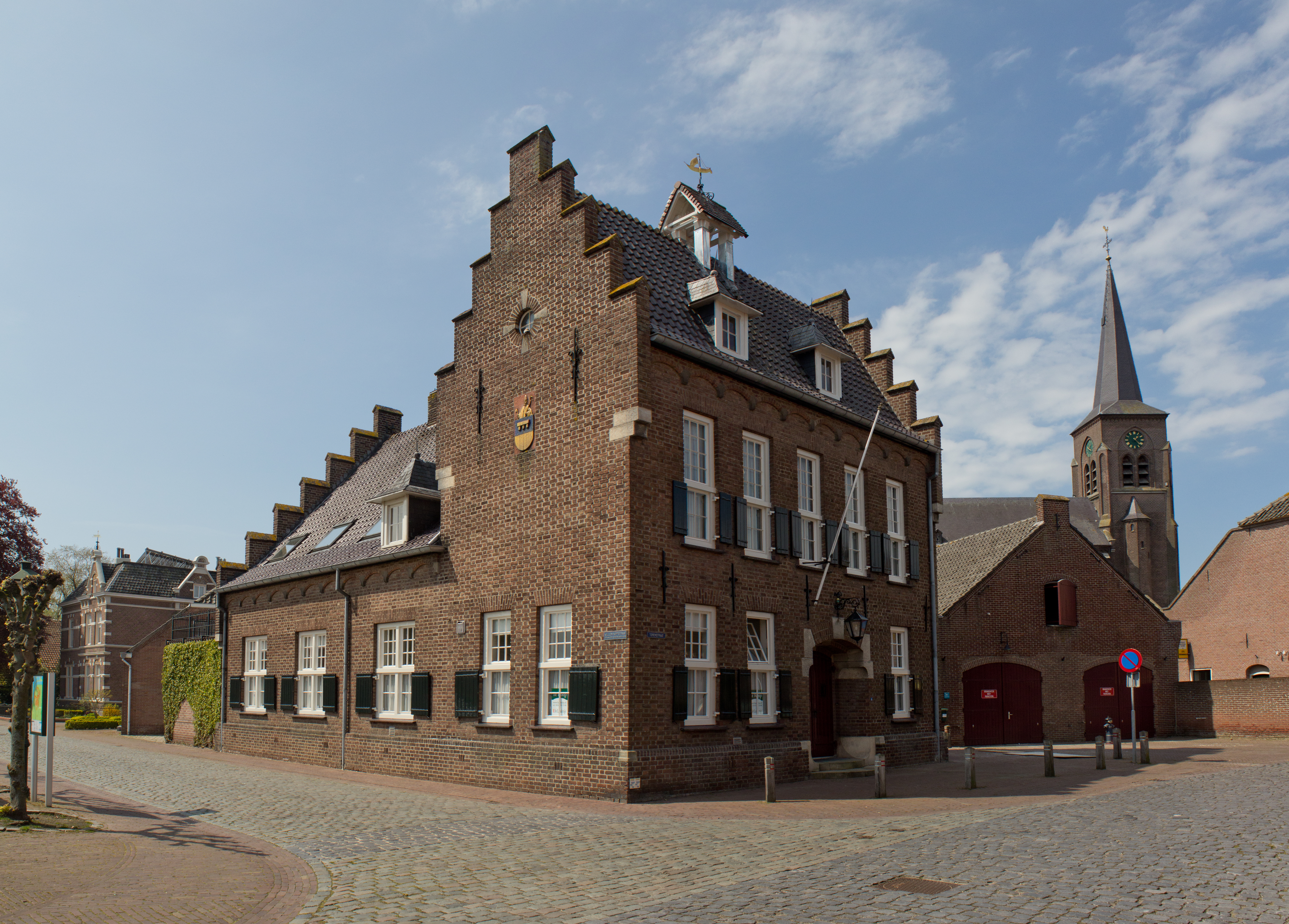
The town hall of Megen doubled as the German headquarters

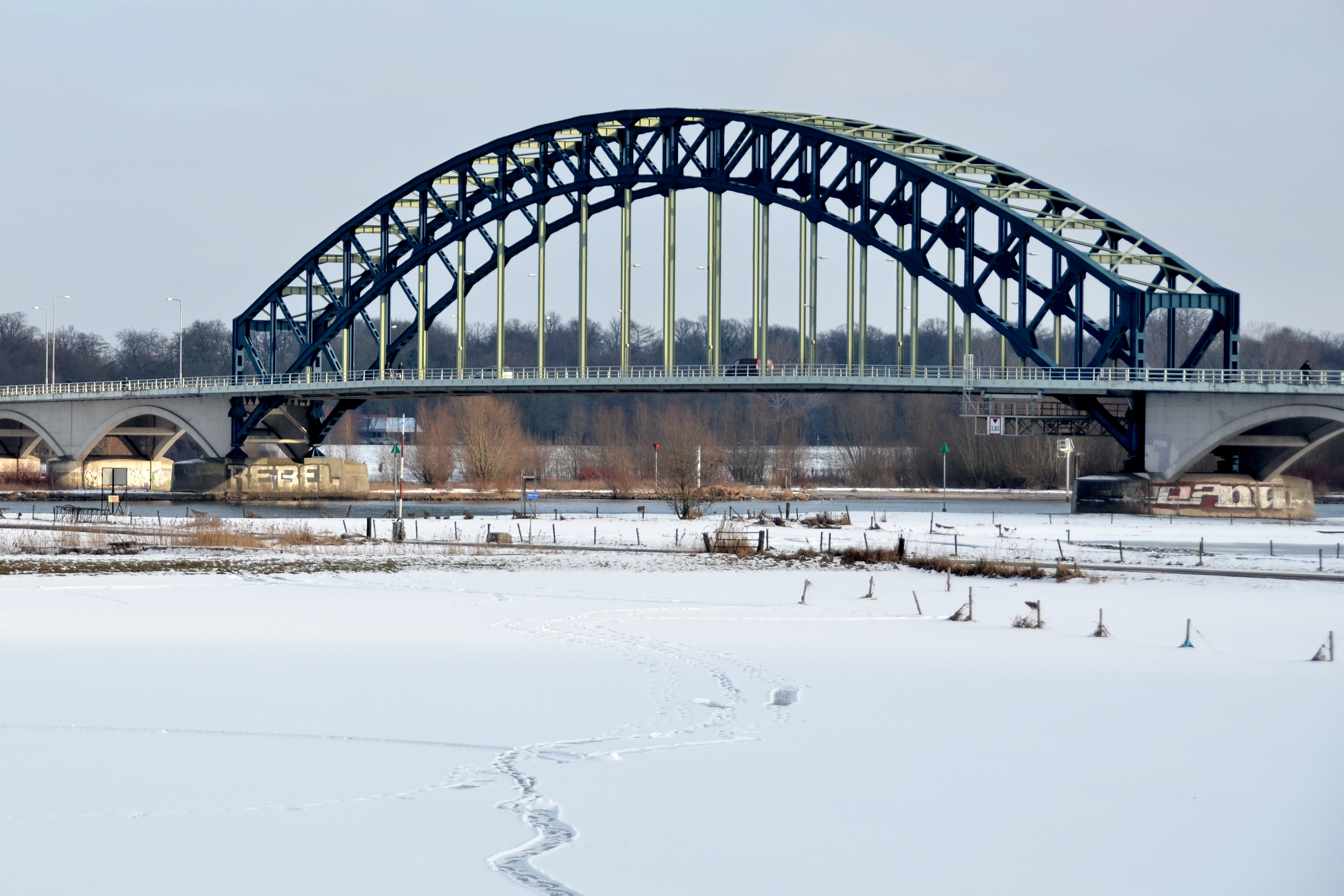
The IJsselbrug in Zwolle was the location of the final river crossing

Michiel feels resentment towards his father, the mayor, who is seemingly only interested in maintaining the status quo between the town and the German Army. However, Michiel worships his Uncle Ben, an adventurer in contact with the local resistance. During the winter of 1944–1945, Michiel's loyalties are tested.

An RAF de Havilland Mosquito is hit in the air and crashes, but before it hits the ground, a young British airman is able to escape by parachute.

One of the villagers, Dirk (the elder brother of Michiel's best friend), helps the airman, Jack, but Dirk is later arrested. Before his arrest, Dirk gives Michiel a letter to be delivered to Bertus, the village blacksmith. Before Michiel can deliver the letter, Bertus is shot and killed by the Germans.

Michiel opens the letter, which directs him to Jack's hiding place in the forest. Jack is injured, and Michiel enlists the aid of his sister Erica, a nurse, to take care of him. Jack and Erica soon develop a romantic relationship.

Michiel's father is arrested when the body of a German soldier, killed by Jack on the night of the plane crash, is found in the forest. Jack wants to turn himself in to save Michiel's father, but Ben tells Michiel he (Ben) can save his father. Ben's efforts fail, and Michiel's father is shot by the Germans along with two other men as reprisal for the death of the soldier.

Michiel tries to take Jack to meet his contact in the town of Zwolle, across the River IJssel, but the Germans foil their attempt, and the two narrowly escape after a horseback chase through the forest. Michiel finally turns to his Uncle Ben for help in getting Jack to Zwolle. Ben agrees, and goes to have a smoke with Jack, who is now hiding in a shed at the bottom of their garden.

The next morning, Michiel goes to the shed to check on Jack, but he is not there. He finds him in Erica's room, in bed with his sister. After this, Ben, Jack, and Erica set off for the bridge to Zwolle. As they leave, Ben tells Michiel that Dirk should never have gotten Michiel involved with Jack. After they go, Michiel realizes that he had never mentioned Dirk's role to Ben. Quickly checking Ben's suitcase, he finds papers showing that Ben is working for the Germans.

Rushing to the river, Michiel stops the trio, grabs Jack's pistol, and confronts Ben. While Michiel guards Ben, Jack and Erica succeed in making it across the river to Zwolle. Ben tells Michiel that he had arranged for his father to be released, but that his father refused to let another villager be shot in his place. Ben attempts to escape to a passing German patrol, but Michiel shoots and kills him.

A few months later, Allied soldiers enter the village and are rapturously welcomed by the villagers. One of the soldiers brings a letter for Erica, presumably from Jack. Michiel hesitates to join in the celebrations after all that has happened, but finally joins in.

== Cast ==
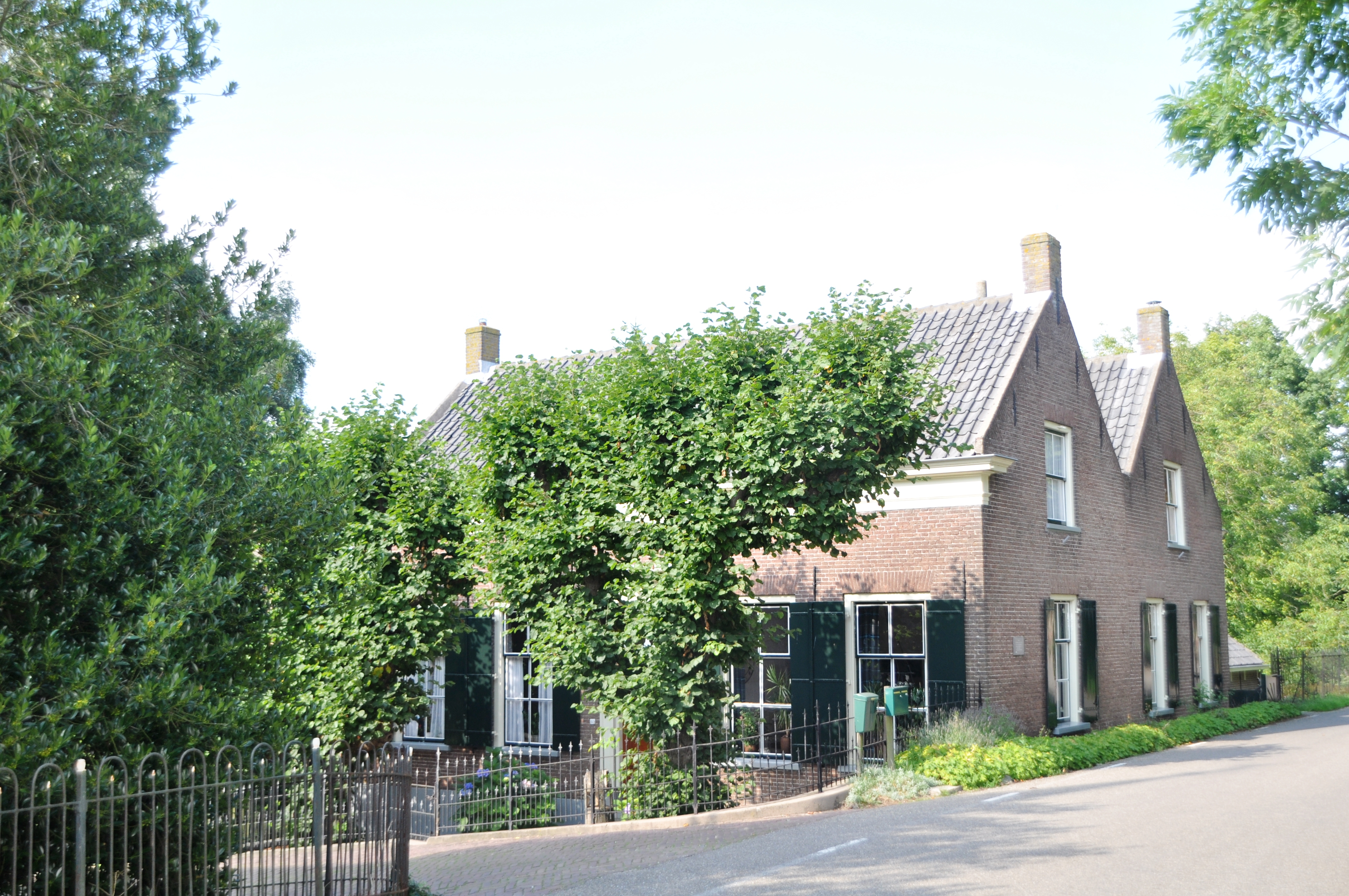
The liberation scene was filmed in Herwijnen

- Martijn Lakemeier as Michiel van Beusekom
- Yorick van Wageningen as Oom Ben
- Jamie Campbell Bower as Jack
- Raymond Thiry as Vader van Beusekom
- Melody Klaver as Erica van Beusekom
- Anneke Blok as Moeder van Beusekom
- Mees Peijnenburg as Dirk Knopper
- Tygo Gernandt as Bertus
- Dan van Husen as Colonel Auer
- Ad van Kempen as Schafter

== Production ==
The film's budget was estimated to be €4 million and filming took place in the Netherlands and Lithuania.

Filming locations in the Netherlands included the community of Herwijnen in the province of Gelderland, Lopik in the province of Utrecht, Zwolle in Overijssel as well as the communities of Megen and Woudrichem in North Brabant. The area around the old town hall of Megen, as well as the building itself, doubled as the location where the Germans had their headquarters.

The two other locations were situated in Lithuania, in Silute and Vilnius.

== Release ==
The film premiered in Amsterdam on 17 November 2008. It was released in Belgium on 3 December 2008 and in Germany was shown at the Berlin International Film Festival in February 2009. Other film festivals where Winter in Wartime was shown include the South Korean Pusan International Film Festival, the Rome Film Festival, the Palm Springs International Film Festival, and three Canadian European Union Film Festivals.

== Reception ==
=== Box office ===
Approximately 900,000 people in the Netherlands and 60,000 people in Belgium saw the film in cinemas.

=== Critical reception ===
Winter In Wartime has an approval rating of 75% on review aggregator website Rotten Tomatoes, based on 67 reviews, and an average rating of 6.5/10. The website's critical consensus states: "A gripping, handsomely shot World War II melodrama with thriller elements successfully mixed in". On Metacritic assigned the film a weighted average score of 66 out of 100, based on 18 critics, indicating "generally favorable reviews".

=== Awards and nominations ===
Winter In Wartime was short-listed for the Academy Awards for the Best Foreign Language Film.

== See also ==
- Cinema of the Netherlands
- List of Dutch submissions for the Academy Award for Best Foreign Language Film
- List of submissions to the 82nd Academy Awards for Best Foreign Language Film
- The Resistance Banker
