= Jan Terlouw =

Dutch politician, physicist and author (1931–2025)

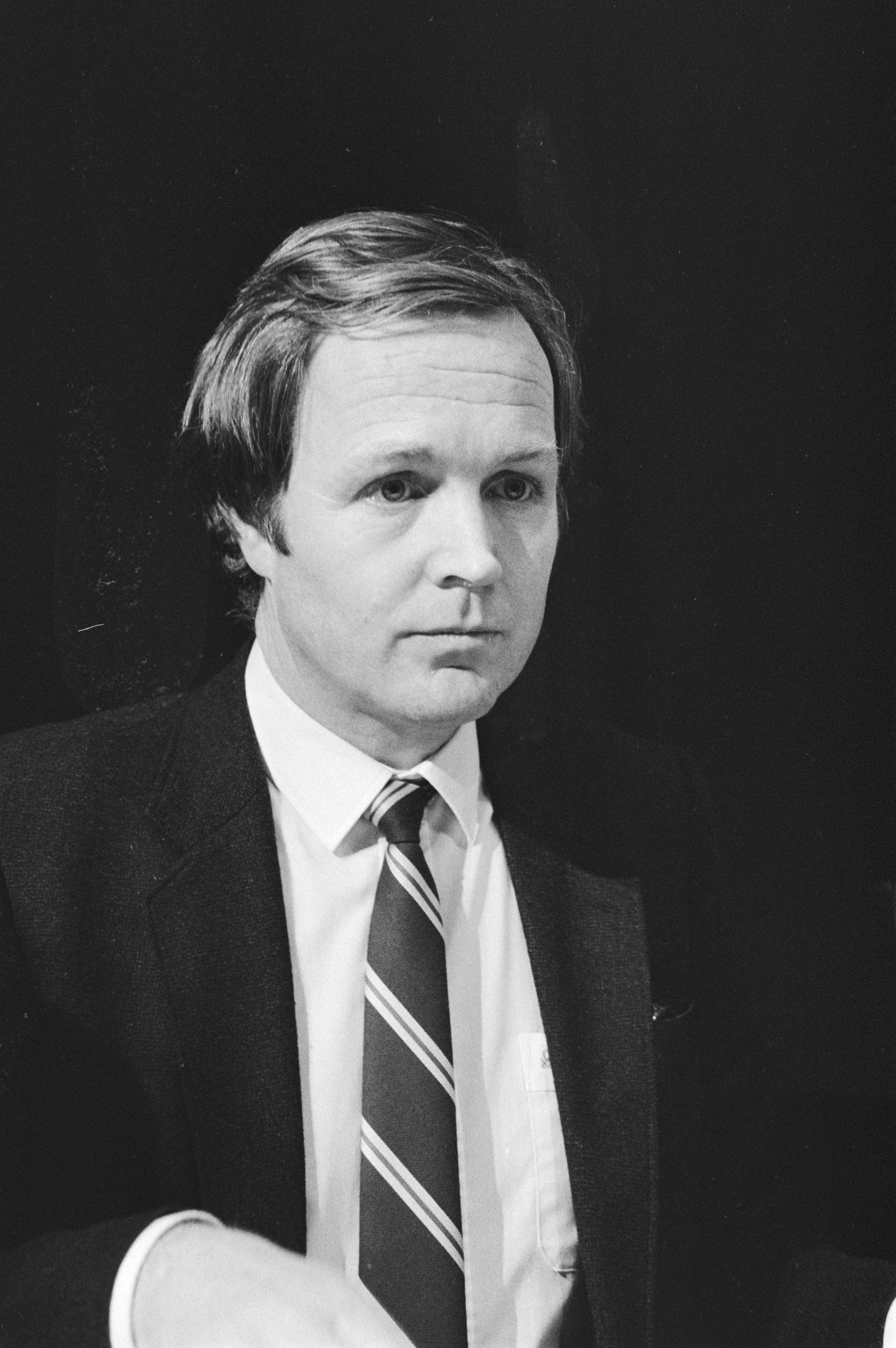
- Terlouw in 1981

Member of the Senate
- In office 8 June 1999 – 10 June 2003

Queen's Commissioner of Gelderland
- In office 1 November 1991 – 1 December 1996
- Monarch: Beatrix
- Preceded by: Ad Oele (ad interim)
- Succeeded by: Jan Kamminga

Deputy Prime Minister of the Netherlands
- In office 11 September 1981 – 4 November 1982 Serving with Joop den Uyl (1982)
- Prime Minister: Dries van Agt
- Preceded by: Hans Wiegel
- Succeeded by: Gijs van Aardenne

Minister of Economic Affairs
- In office 11 September 1981 – 4 November 1982
- Prime Minister: Dries van Agt
- Preceded by: Gijs van Aardenne
- Succeeded by: Gijs van Aardenne

Leader of the Democrats 66
- In office 1 September 1973 – 8 September 1982
- Preceded by: Hans van Mierlo
- Succeeded by: Laurens Jan Brinkhorst

Leader of the Democrats 66 in the House of Representatives
- In office 1 September 1973 – 11 September 1981
- Preceded by: Hans van Mierlo
- Succeeded by: Laurens Jan Brinkhorst

Member of the House of Representatives
- In office 11 May 1971 – 11 September 1981

Personal details
- Born: Jan Cornelis Terlouw; 15 November 1931 Kamperveen, Netherlands
- Died: 16 May 2025 (aged 93) Twello, Netherlands
- Party: Democrats 66 (from 1967)
- Spouse: Alexandra van Hulst (m. 1956; died 2017)
- Children: 4
- Education: Utrecht University
- Occupation: Politician; Nuclear physicist; Mathematician; Professor; Nonprofit director; Author; Researcher; Political pundit

Military service
- Allegiance: Netherlands
- Branch: Royal Netherlands Army
- Years of service: 1956–1958 (Conscription); 1958–1961 (Reserve)
- Rank: Private first class

Jan Cornelis Terlouw (15 November 1931 – 16 May 2025) was a Dutch politician, physicist and author. A member of the Democrats 66 (D66) party, he served as Deputy Prime Minister of the Netherlands from 1981 to 1982 under Prime Minister Dries van Agt.

Terlouw studied physics at the Utrecht University where he obtained his master's degree and then worked as a researcher at the FOM before finishing his thesis and obtaining his PhD in mathematics and physics. Terlouw worked as a nuclear physics researcher at the Massachusetts Institute of Technology (MIT) from February 1960 until April 1962, and for the Royal Institute of Technology (KTH) from August 1965 until December 1966. After the 1971 general election Terlouw was elected to the House of Representatives on 11 May 1971 and served as a frontbencher and spokesperson for economic affairs and science. After Party Leader and Parliamentary leader Hans van Mierlo announced he was stepping down, Terlouw was unanimously selected as his successor on 1 September 1973.

For the 1977 and 1981 general elections, Terlouw served as lead candidate, and following a cabinet formation with Christian democratic Leader Dries van Agt and Labour Leader Joop den Uyl formed the second Van Agt cabinet, with Terlouw appointed Deputy Prime Minister and Minister of Economic Affairs, taking office on 11 September 1981. The cabinet fell just seven months into its term and was replaced by the caretaker third Van Agt cabinet, with Terlouw continuing his offices. For the 1982 general election, Terlouw again served as lead candidate but shortly thereafter announced he was stepping down as Leader on 8 September 1982.

Terlouw continued to be active in politics and in December 1982 he was nominated as the next Secretary-General of the European Conference of Ministers of Transport (ECMT - evolved in 2006 into the International Transport Forum, ITF) serving from 30 January 1983 until 15 October 1991. In October 1991 Terlouw was nominated as the next Queen's Commissioner of Gelderland serving from 1 November 1991 until 1 December 1996. Terlouw also became active in the public sector, and worked as a professor of Urbanization at the University of Amsterdam from January 1997 until January 2000. After the Senate election of 1999 Terlouw was elected as a Member of the Senate serving from 8 June 1999 until 10 June 2003 and served as a frontbencher and spokesperson for the interior, economic affairs and defence.

Terlouw retired from active politics at 71 but continued to be active in the public sector as a non-profit director and served on several state commissions (nl) and councils on behalf of the government, and worked as a professor of Literature at the Tilburg University from September 2003 until September 2004. Following his retirement Terlouw continued to be active as an advocate and activist for social norms, sustainable development, animal welfare and for more European integration. Terlouw was known for his abilities as a consensus builder and negotiator and continued to comment on political affairs in his final years.

Terlouw was active as a prolific author since the 1970s, having written more than dozen young adult fiction books: his 1972 novel Winter in Wartime was adapted and released as a feature film in 2008.

== Background ==
=== Early life and education ===
Terlouw was born in Kamperveen, Overijssel and grew up in the Veluwe. He was the eldest son a family of five, having two younger brothers and two sisters.

After high school, Terlouw studied at Utrecht University, where he obtained an MSc degree in physics in 1956, and subsequently a PhD degree in mathematics and physics in 1964.

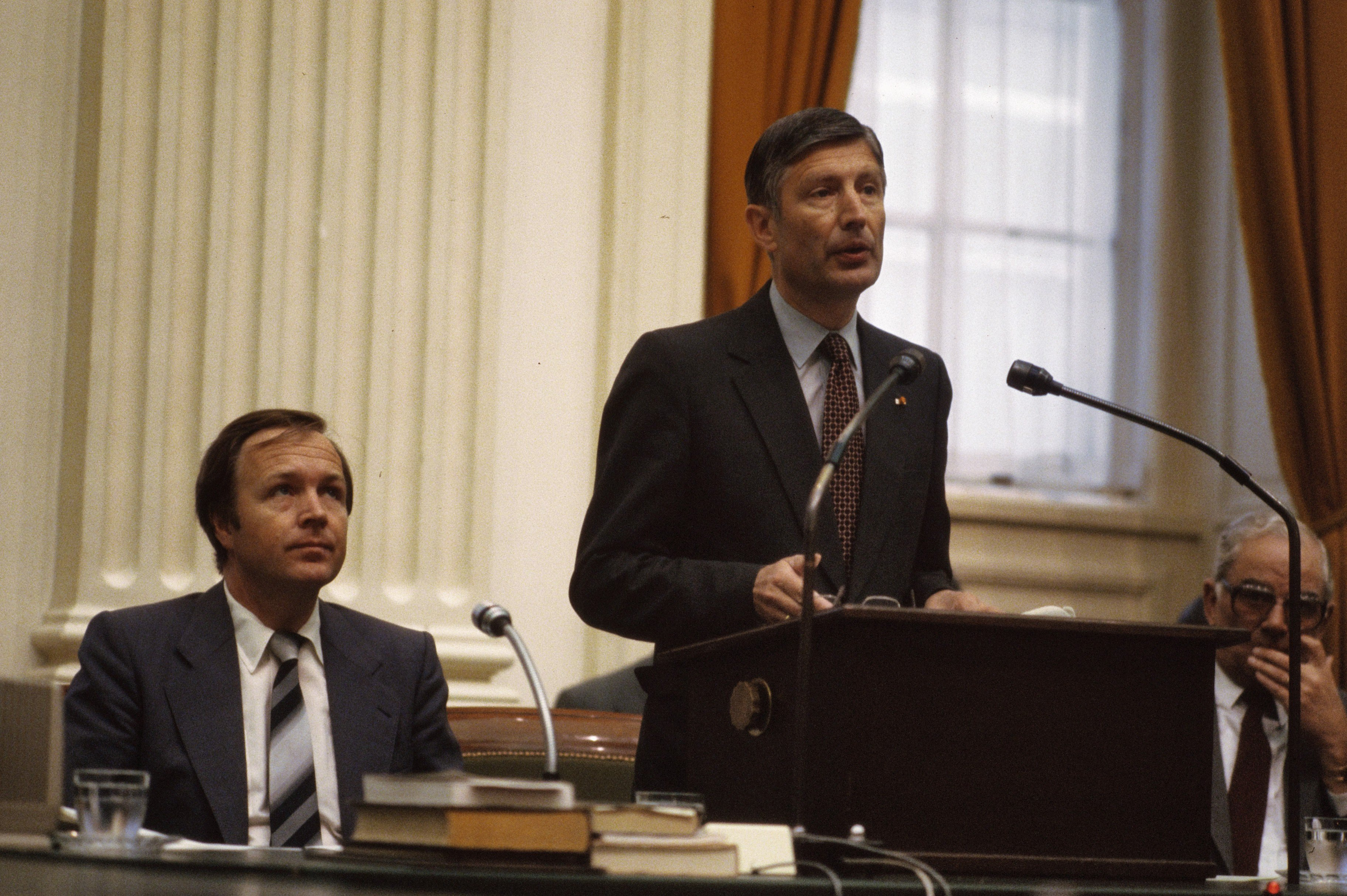
Deputy Prime Minister Jan Terlouw and Prime Minister Dries van Agt in the House of Representatives on 8 June 1982.

=== Career ===
After graduating from Utrecht University, he worked as a physics researcher in the Netherlands, the United States, and Sweden.

After working for thirteen years, he became a politician, joining the Dutch House of Representatives (the lower house of the Dutch legislature) as a member of the Democraten 66 political party in 1970.

=== Personal life and death ===
Terlouw was married to Alexandra van Hulst until her death on 23 August 2017. He was a father of four and grandfather to 12. Terlouw died in Twello on 16 May 2025, at the age of 93.

== Publications ==
Terlouw wrote 24 children's books, most notably Winter in Wartime (Oorlogswinter, 1972) and How to Become King (Koning van Katoren, 1971), both of which won the Gouden Griffel and have been made into motion pictures directed by Martin Koolhoven.

Terlouw's books have been illustrated by various illustrators, including Dick van der Maat, Martijn van der Linden and Fiel van der Veen.

== Electoral history ==
Electoral history of Jan Terlouw
Year	Body	Party	Pos.	Votes	Result		Ref.
Year	Body	Party	Pos.	Votes	Party seats	Individual	Ref.
2023	House of Representatives	Democrats 66	79 (Note: Terlouw participated as a lijstduwer.)	1,176	9	Lost	

== Honours and awards ==
=== Honours ===
- Commander of the Order of Orange-Nassau (Netherlands, 9 December 1982)

=== Honorary degrees ===
- Doctor honoris causa from the Vrije Universiteit Brussel (Belgium, 23 mei 2017)

=== Awards ===
- 1972 Gouden Griffel for the novel Koning van Katoren (How to Become King)
- 1973 Gouden Griffel for the novel Winter in Wartime
- 1990 Prize of the Netherlands Children's Jury for the novel The Figure-skater
- 2000 Prize of the Dutch Joung Jury for Eigen rechter (1988)

== Notes ==
Party political offices
Preceded by Hans van Mierlo	Leader of the Democrats 66; 1973–1982	Succeeded by Laurens Jan Brinkhorst
Preceded by Hans van Mierlo	Parliamentary leader of the Democrats 66 in the House of Representatives; 1973–1981	Succeeded by Laurens Jan Brinkhorst
Preceded by Hans van Mierlo; 1972	Lead candidate of the Democrats 66; 1977, 1981, 1982	Succeeded by Hans van Mierlo; 1986
Political offices
Preceded by Hans Wiegel	Deputy Prime Minister; 1981–1982; Served alongside: Joop den Uyl	Succeeded by Gijs van Aardenne
Preceded by Gijs van Aardenne	Minister of Economic Affairs; 1981–1982	Succeeded by Gijs van Aardenne
Preceded by Ad Oele; Ad interim	Queen's Commissioner of Gelderland; 1991–1996	Succeeded by Jan Kamminga
Business positions
Unknown	Chairman of the Supervisory board of the GelreDome; 1996–2000	Unknown
Non-profit organization positions
Preceded by Gijs van Aardenne	Chairman of the Supervisory board of the Energy Research Centre; 1995–2005	Succeeded by Ruud Lubbers
Academic offices
Preceded by Annemieke Roobeek	Distinguished Professor; Wibaut Chair of the University of Amsterdam; 1997–1999	Succeeded by Geert Mak
Preceded by Leo Vroman	Distinguished Professor; Leonardo Chair of the Tilburg University; 2003–2004	Succeeded by Ted van Lieshout
