= Arne Toonen =

Dutch film director (born 1975)

- Born: 9 January 1975 (age 50); Boxmeer, Netherlands
- Occupation: Film director

Arne Toonen (born 9 January 1975) is a Dutch film director. He directed the films Dik Trom (2010), The Little Gangster (2015) and Amsterdam Vice (2019). Several of his films won the Golden Film and Platinum Film awards.

== Career ==
In 2010, Toonen directed the film Dik Trom based on the characters of the Dik Trom book series by Cornelis Johannes Kieviet. The film won both the Golden Film and Platinum Film awards. The film also won the Golden Calf for Best Production Design award at the 2011 Netherlands Film Festival. Toonen is also the director of the 2012 film Black Out.

His short film Drop Dead won the Competition for the Short Film Award at the Osnabrück Independent Film Festival. Toonen directed the 2012 film Black Out. In 2015, he directed the film The Little Gangster (De Boskampi's). The film won the Michel Award at the 2015 Filmfest Hamburg, the audience award at the Seoul International Youth Film Festival and the jury award at Oulu International Children's and Youth Film Festival.

In 2019, Toonen directed the film Amsterdam Vice (Baantjer: Het Begin) based on the novels of A. C. Baantjer. The film won the Golden Film award two weeks later after having sold 100,000 tickets.

Toonen also directed a 2023 episode of the Van der Valk television series. He is one of the directors of the 2025 television series Safe Harbor.

== Personal life ==
Toonen married Birgit Schuurman in July 2008. They divorced in February 2019. Schuurman also played roles in several films directed by Toonen. They have a son.

Toonen has tattoos related to several of his film projects and he is aiming to get one for each film.

== Selected filmography ==
- 2010: Dik Trom
- 2012: Black Out
- 2015: The Little Gangster (De Boskampi's)
- 2019: Amsterdam Vice (Baantjer: Het Begin)
