= Martin Koolhoven =

Dutch film director and screenwriter (born 1969)

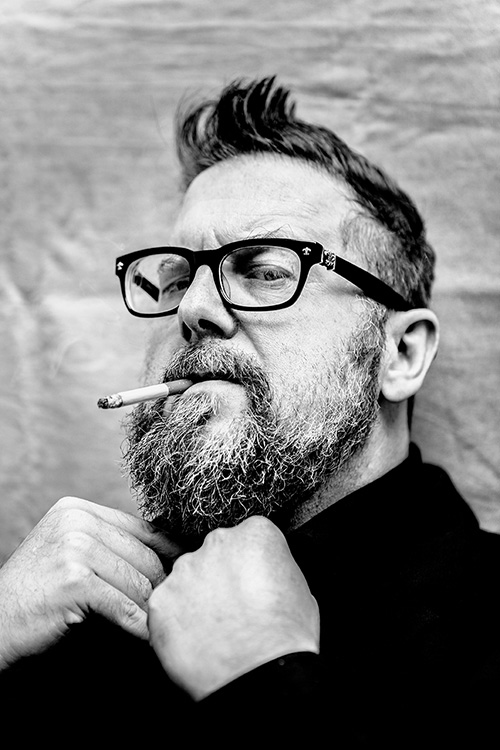
- Born: Martinus Wouter Koolhoven; 25 April 1969 (age 57); The Hague, Netherlands
- Occupations: Film director, screenwriter
- Years active: 1993–present

Martinus Wouter "Martin" Koolhoven (born 25 April 1969) is a Dutch film director and screenwriter. Internationally he is most known for Schnitzel Paradise (2005), Winter in Wartime (2008) and Brimstone (2016), which was his first film in English. It was released in 2017, after it premiered in the competition of the Venice Film Festival in 2016.

Koolhoven expanded his work, with a theater show about film, television programs such as De Kijk van Koolhoven and talent initiatives like Koolhoven Presenteert (2024), as well as cinema programs in Eye Film Institute and film theaters across the country.

== Early life ==
Martin Koolhoven was born on 25 April 1969 in The Hague in the Netherlands. Koolhoven went to the Dutch Film Academy (in Amsterdam) and graduated in 1996 as a screenwriter and director.

== Career ==
His first film was a 53-minute television film named Duister Licht ("Dark Light").

His second film Suzy Q featured actress Carice van Houten, who Koolhoven worked with several times in the films to come. It was also the feature debut of actor Michiel Huisman.

His first (Dutch) cinematic release was AmnesiA (2001), which also got a small release in New York City.

In 2004, Koolhoven was one of the New Faces In European Cinema as presented by Pedro Almodovar at the AFI festival (Hollywood).

In 2005 Koolhoven directed Schnitzel Paradise. The film was shown at many international film festivals, including the Berlin Film Festival and the Karlovy Vary Film Festival where it was part of the Variety Critic's choice. In the same year Koolhoven released Bonkers, a children's movie.

In 2006 Koolhoven directed Happy Family.

In 2008 Koolhoven made Oorlogswinter (Winter in Wartime), a Dutch movie based on the novel by the same name, written by Jan Terlouw. The movie was the Dutch entry for the Academy Awards and was selected to be on the shortlist (of 9 films). The movie was distributed in the United States by Sony Classics and was sold to about 25 other countries.

In 2010, Koolhoven started his own production company, together with producer Els Vandevorst, called N279 Entertainment that produced several movies. His first production for N279 Entertainment as a director was the western named Brimstone. It premiered at the 73rd Venice International Film Festival in 2016 and became Koolhoven's fifth consecutive hit film in The Netherlands.

Since 2018, Koolhoven has his own TV show on Dutch television, called De Kijk van Koolhoven, in which he shares his views on filmmaking. Using film scenes that he dissects, he talks extensively about his favorite actors, directors, and films.

In 2020, he wrote a theater show Klassiekers met Koolhoven with which he performed in theaters for two seasons.

In 2020, Koolhoven received the Silver Rose, an award given annually to a recipient that is or has been of great significance to the Dutch film world.

In 2022 Koolhoven was presented with the Rutger Hauer Award, which is given annually to a recipient that has made an important contribution to the development and promotion of young film talent in the Netherlands.

In 2024, at the International Film Festival Rotterdam, his talent development program Koolhoven Presents premiered. This included six genre films by talented creators whom he had selected and mentored. Later that year, these films were broadcast by VPRO Television.

Besides all this Koolhoven has a monthly show in Eye Film Institute Netherlands with Ronald Simons, where he shows and talks about movies. For more than ten years it was called Cinema Egzotik, but in 2019 it transformed into Koolhoven & Simons where they show only one movie, but have more time to talk and show more beforehand.

Koolhoven was asked to do the something similar in Forum Groningen, which lead to Koolhovens Keuze, a program in many Dutch film theatres across The Netherlands where Koolhoven talks about and shows movies. He picks a different one everywhere, so he can rewatch his favorite movies.

Koolhoven is working on a noir thriller Emerald Butterfly, set in Jakarta, 1946. and on the adaptation of Angel Maker by Stefan Brijs

== Filmography ==
=== Films ===
- Chess (1993) – short film
- KOEKOEK! (1995) – short film
- De Orde Der Dingen (1996) – short film
- Duister licht (1997) – TV film
- Suzy Q (1999) – TV film
- AmnesiA (2001)
- De grot (2001)
- South (2004)
- Schnitzel Paradise (2005)
- Knetter (2005)
- 'n Beetje Verliefd (2006)
- Winter in Wartime (2008)
- Brimstone (2016)

=== TV series ===
- Koefnoen (2007) – western and Ingmar Bergman parodies
- De kijk van Koolhoven (2018-now) – Dutch TV series in which Koolhoven takes a look at his favorite genres and their movies.
- Koolhoven Presenteert (2024) Koolhoven chose six filmmakers from the new generation of filmmakers and guided them in making a genre film. On television he introduced the films in his own familiar style.
