= List of Dutch films of the 2000s =

This is a list of films produced in the Netherlands during the 2000s. The films are produced in the Dutch language.

== 2000 ==
Title	Director	Cast	Category	Notes	Distributor
Babs (2000)	Irma Achten	Brigitte Kaandorp	Comedy; Music	first main role for stand-up comedian Brigitte Kaandorp	Buena Vista International
Lek (2000)	Jean van de Velde	Cas Jansen; Victor Löw	Drama; Crime		
De Fûke (2000)	Steven de Jong	Peter Tuinman	Drama	spoken in West Frisian language	
Wilde Mossels (2000)	Erik de Bruyn	Fedja van Huêt; Frank Lammers	Drama	Entered into the 23rd Moscow International Film Festival	
Rent A Friend (2000)	Eddy Terstall	Marc van Uchellen; Rifka Lodeizen	Drama; Comedy		
Mariken (2000)	André van Duren	Kim van Kooten; Jan Decleir	Teen drama	Dutch-Belgian co-production	
Total loss (2000)					
Bij ons in de Jordaan (2000)	Willem van de Sande Bakhuyzen	Kees Prins	Drama	Miniserie, Johnny Jordaan-biopic	
De Omweg (2000)	Frouke Fokkema	Tamar van den Dop	Drama	arthouse-film	
De Vriendschap (2000)	Nouchka van Brakel	Gerard Cox; Willem Nijholt	Drama comedy		
Ochtendzwemmers (2000)	Nicole van Kilsdonk	Ricky Koole; Daniel Boissevain	Drama; Comedy	Telefilm, brought out in 2000 and 2001	
Father and Daughter (2000)	Michael Dudok de Wit		Animatie	won an Oscar for best short animation film	
De Stilte van het Naderen (2000)	Stephan Brenninkmeijer	Elvira Out	Drama	Telefilm	
De Zwarte Meteoor (2000)	Guido Pieters	Jet Novuka; Thekla Reuten	Drama	based on the life of Steve Mokone, a soccer player who played in the Netherlands for a year.	
Jacky (2000)	Fow Pyng Hu, Brat Ljatifi			Screened at the 2000 Cannes Film Festival	

== 2001 ==
Title	Director	Cast	Category	Notes	Distributor
Met Grote Blijdschap (2001)	Lodewijk Crijns	Jack Wouterse; Jaap Spijkers	Drama	made into a play in 2006	
Lijmen/Het Been (2001)	Robbe de Hert	Willeke van Ammelrooy	Drama; Crime	Dutch-Belgian co-production	
Baby Blue (2001)	Theo van Gogh	Roeland Fernhout	Thriller	mostly in English	Buena Vista International
Costa! (2001)	Johan Nijenhuis	Katja Schuurman; Georgina Verbaan; Daan Schuurmans	Drama; Comedy	got the nickname Soapfilm.	
Ik ook van jou (2001)	Ruud van Hemert	Antonie Kamerling; Angela Schijf	Drama	After the novel of Ronald Giphart	
Storm in Mijn Hoofd (2001)	Frans Weisz	Coen Flink; Pierre Bokma	Drama	Telefilm	
Wilhelmina (2001)	Olga Madsen	Anne Will Blankers	Drama	Miniserie	
Uitgesloten (2001)	Mijke de Jong	Egbert-jan Weeber	Drama	Telefilm	
Family (2001)	Willem van de Sande Bakhuyzen	Bram van der Vlught	Drama	Telefilm	
Het Negende uur (2001)	Gerrard Verhage	Bart Klever	Drama	Telefilm	
Saint Amour (2001)	Eric Oosthoek	Antonie Kamerling	Drama	Telefilm, Belgian co-production	
Roos en Rana (2001)	Meral Uslu	Sarah Jonker; Ozlem Solmaz	Drama	Telefilm	
Liefje (2001)	Emile Fallaux	Jelka van Houten; Ramsey Nasr	Drama	Telefilm	
Nynke (2001)	Pieter Verhoeff	Monic Hendrickx; Jeroen Willemse	Drama	Golden Calf (best film)	
AmnesiA (2001)	Martin Koolhoven	Fedja van Huêt; Carice van Houten	Drama	Opening Filmfestival Rotterdam	
De Grot (2001)	Martin Koolhoven	Fedja van Huêt; Marcel Hensema	Drama; Crime		
Qui Vive (2001)	Frans Weisz	Pierre Bokma; Kitty Courbois	Drama		
Terrorama (2001)			Horror	only brought out on video and DVD	
De nacht van Aalbers (2001)	Theo van Gogh	Kim van Kooten; Huub Stapel	Thriller		
Morlang (2001)	Tjebbo Penning	Paul Freeman	English		
Magonia (2001)	Ineke Smits	Linda van Dyck	Romantic; Drama		
Drift (2001)	Michiel van Jaarsveld	Christel Oomen; Dragan Bakema	Drama		
Iles Flottantes (2001)	Nanouk Leopold	Halina Reijn; Maria Kraakman	Feminism; Drama		
Sloophamer (2001)	Ger Poppelaars	Frits Lambrechts; Cees Geel	Drama	Telefilm	
Vergeef Me (2001)	Cyrus Frisch				
Monte Carlo (2001)	Norbert ter Hall	Kitty Courbois; John Wijdenbosch	Drama		
The Discovery of Heaven (2001) aka De Ontdekking van de Hemel	Jeroen Krabbé	Stephen Fry	Drama	English	
Minoes (2001)	Vincent Bal	Carice van Houten; Theo Maassen	Teen		Warner Bros. Pictures
Soul Assassin (2001)	Laurence Malkin	Skeet Ullrich; Derek de Lint	Crime	English	

== 2002 ==
Title	Director	Cast	Category	Notes	Distributor
Science Fiction (2002)	Danny Deprez	Wendy van Dijk; Koen De Bouw	Teen		
Tussenland (2002)	Eugenie Janssen	Jan Munter; John Kon Kolei	Drama	Won a Tiger award	
Achttien (2002)		Egbert Jan Weeber	Drama		
Bella Bettien (2002)	Hans Pos	Thekla Reuten; Kim van Kooten	Drama; Crime		
Het Wonder van Máxima (2002)	Paul Ruven	Sylvia Munt; Halina Reijn	Drama	(Telefilm)	
Oesters van Nam Kee (2002)	Pollo de Pimentel	Egbert-jan Weeber; Katja Schuurman	Drama		United International Pictures
Zus & Zo (2002)	Paula van der Oest	Jacob Derwig; Halina Reijn	Drama; Comedy	Oscar (Candidate)	
Loenatik de Moevie (2002)	Bobby Eerhart	John Buijsman	Comedy		
Volle maan (2002)	Johan Nijenhuis	Cas Janssen; Daan Schuurmans	Drama		
Moonlight (2002)	Paula van der Oest			Entered into the 25th Moscow International Film Festival	
Swingers (2002)	Stephan Breninkmeijer	Joep Sertons	Drama		
Olivetti 82 (2002)	Rudi van Den Bossche		Drama	Belgian co-production	
Ja zuster, nee zuster (2002)	Pieter Kramer	Loes Luca; Paul de Leeuw	Comedy; Music		Warner Bros. Pictures
De Tweeling (2002)	Ben Sombogaart	Thekla Reuten	Drama; War		
Pietje Bell (2002)	Maria Peters	Quinten Schram	Children's film		Buena Vista International
Paramaribo Papers (2002)	Ger Poppelaars	Mark Rietman	Drama	Partially recorded in Suriname, Telefilm	

== 2003 ==
Title	Director	Cast	Category	Notes	Distributor
Loverboy (2003)	Lodewijk Crijns	Monique van de Werff; Dragan Bakema	Drama	Telefilm	
Novemberlicht (2003)	Eric Oosthoek	Niek Pancras	Drama	Telefilm	
Boy Ecury (2003)	Frans Weisz	Steve Hooi; Johnny de Mol	Biography	Telefilm	
De Arm van Jezus (2003)	Andre van der Hout	Ferry Heijne	Drama		
Liever Verliefd (2003)	Johan Nijenhuis	Miryanna van Reeden; Romijn Conen	Comedy; Romantic		Universal Pictures; Independent Films
Van God Los (2003)	Pieter Kuijpers	Egbert jan Weeber; Tygo Gernandt	Drama; Crime	Golden Calf, best actor	
15.35: Spoor 1 (2003)	Tim Oliehoek	Caro Lenssen; Marijn Klaver	Drama	Telefilm	
Julie en Herman (2003)	Theo van Gogh; Kate Brown	Jack Wouterse; Lore Dijkman	Drama		
Lebenspornografie (2003)	Edwin Brienen	Eva Dorrepaal	Drama		
De Schippers van de Kameleon (2003)	Steven de Jong	Koen & Jos van de Donk	Teen		
Kees de jongen (2003)	André van Duren	Theo Maassen; Monic Hendrickx	Teen drama		
De Passievrucht (2003)	Maarten Treurniet	Carice van Houten; Peter Paul Muller	Drama	After the novel of Karel Glastra van Loon	
Interview (2003)	Theo van Gogh	Katja Schuurman; Pierre Bokma	Drama		
Cloaca (2003)	Willem van de Sande Bakhuyzen	Peter Blok; Jaap Spijkers	Drama	Film based on the play	
Verder Dan de Maan (2003)	Stijn Coninx	Huub Stapel; Johanna ter Steege	Drama		Warner Bros. Pictures
Grimm (2003)	Alex van Warmerdam	Jacob Derwig; Halina Reijn	Drama		A-Film Distribution
Pipo en de Pa-Parelridder (2003)	Martin Lagestee	Mariska van Kolck; Daan Schuurmans	Children's film		Universal Pictures; Independent Films
Phileine zegt sorry (2003)	Robert Jan Westdijk	Kim van Kooten; Michiel Huisman	Comedy; Drama	After Ronald Giphart's novel	
Sinterklaas en het Gevaar in de Vallei (2003)	Martijn van Nellesteijn	Pamela Tewes			
Pietje Bell 2: De Jacht op de Tsarenkroon (2003)	Maria Peters	Quinten Schram		After the book series by Chris van Abcoude	Buena Vista International

== 2004 ==
Title	Director	Cast	Category	Notes	Distributor
Shouf Shouf Habibi! (2004)	Albert ter Heerd	Mimoun Oussia; Touriya Haoud	Comedy		
Feestje! (2004)	Ruud van Hemert	Antonie Kamerling; Beau van Dorens	Comedy		
De Kroon (2004)	Hans Pos	Hadwiches Minis; Roef Ragas	Drama	Telefilm	
De Ordening (2004)	Pieter Kuijpers	Angela Schijf; Roeland Fernhout	Drama	Telefilm	
Drijfzand (2004)	Kees Vlaanderen	Johnny de Mol	Drama	Telefilm	
Zinloos (2004)	Arno Dierickx	Peter Blok; Fedja van Huêt	Drama	Telefilm	
Deining (2004)	Nicole van Kilsdonk	Jaqueline Blom	Drama	Telefilm	
BlueBird (2004)	Mijke de Jong	Elsie de Brauw; Jaap Spijkers	Drama; Teen	Telefilm	
In Oranje (2004)	Joram Lursen	Wendy van Dijk; Thomas Acda	Comedy; Drama		
Fighting Fish (2004)	Jamal Aattache	Chantal Janzen; Jennifer de Jong	Drama; Action	first Dutch kung fu-film	Universal Pictures
Het Zuiden (2004)	Martin Koolhoven	Monic Hendrickx; Frank Lammers	Drama		
Ellis in Glamourland (2004)	Pieter Kramer	Linda de Mol; Joan Collins	Comedy		
Pluk van de Petteflet (2004)	Ben Sombogaart	Yannick van de Velde; Arjan Ederveen	Children's film	Golden film	Warner Bros. Pictures
Cool (2004)	Theo van Gogh	Katja Schuurman; Johnny de Mol	Drama		
Simon (2004)	Eddy Terstall	Cees Geel; Marcel Hensema	Drama; Comedy	Winner Golden calf	
Stille Nacht (2004)	Ineke Houtman	Victoria Koblenko; Liesbeth Kamerling	Drama; Thriller	Telefilm	
Snowfever (2004)	Pim van Hoeve	Daan Schuurmans; Egbert Jan Weber	Comedy; Drama		
Mysterious Skin (2004)	Gregg Araki	Joseph Gordon-Levitt, Brady Corbet, Michelle Trachtenberg	Drama		
De Dominee (2004)	Gerard Verhage	Peter Paul Muller; Chantal Janzen	Drama; Crime		
Verborgen Gebreken (2004)	Paula van der Oest	Heny Ori	Drama	after the novel of Renate Dorresteijn	
Sinterklaas en het Geheim van de Robijn (2004)	Jeroen van Nellesteijn	Pamela Teves	Children's film		
Gay (2004)	Tom Six	Hugo Metsers III	Drama		
Amazones (2004)	Esmée Lammers	Georgina Verbaan; Monique van de Ven	Drama		
Erik of het klein Insectenboek (2004)	Gidi van Liempd	Jasper Oldenhof	Children's film	Golden film	United International Pictures
Floris (2004)	Jean van de Velde	Brigit Schuurman; Michiel Huisman	Comedy; Adventure		
Madame Jeanette (2004)	Paula van der Oest	Cheryl Ashruf	Drama; Comedy		

== 2005 ==
Title	Director	Cast	Category	Notes	Distributor
Medea (2005)	Theo van Gogh	Katja Schuurman; Thijs Romer	Drama	Miniserie	
Vet Hard (2005)	Tim Oliehoek	Kurt Rogiers; Jack Wouterse	Comedy; Crime		A-Film Distribution
06/05 (2004)	Theo van Gogh	Thijs Romer; Tara Elders	Drama; Thriller		
Lepel (2005)	Willem van de Sande Bakhuyzen	Loes Luca	Children's film		Warner Bros. Pictures
Off Screen (2005)	Pieter Kuijpers	Jan Decleir; Jeroen Krabbe	Drama; Crime		Independent Films
Het Mysterie van het Sardine (2005)	Eric van Zuylen	Victor Low	Drama		
Flirt (2005)	Jaap van Eyck	Egbert-jan Weeber	Comedy		
Gebroken Rood (2005)	Eric Oosthoek	André van de Heuvel	Drama	Telefilm	
Staatsgevaarlijk (2005)	Marcel Visbeen	Sylvia Hoeks	Drama; Thriller	Telefilm	
Gezocht:Man (2005)		Monic Hendrickx	Comedy; Drama	Telefilm	
Allerzielen (2005)	Multiple	Multiple	Drama		
Woensdag (2005)	Jean Paul Arends; Bob Embregts	Sjanet de Geus	Horror		
Casting X (2005)		Hugo Metsers III			
Paid (2005)	Laurence Lamers	Anne Charrier	Crime	English	
Zwarte Zwanen (2005)	Colette Bothoff	Carice van Houten; Dragan Bakema	Drama		
Kameleon 2 (2005)	Steven de Jong	Jos en Koen van der Donk			
Guernsey (2005)	Nanouk Leopold	Maria Kraakman	Drama		
Zoop in Africa (2005)	Johan Nijenhuis	Ewout Genemans; Jon Karthaus	Teen		Independent Films
Het Schnitzelparadijs (2005)	Martin Koolhoven	Bracha van Doesburgh	Comedy		
Joyride (2005)	Frank Herrebout	Tygo Gernandt; Georgina Verbaan	Thriller; Crime		
Knetter (2005)	Martin Koolhoven	Carice van Houten; Jesse Rinsma	Children's film		
Het Paard van Sinterklaas (2005)	Mischa Kamp	Ebbie Tam; Jan Decleir	Children's film		Warner Bros. Pictures
Leef! (2005)	Willem van de Sande Bakhuyzen	Monic Hendrickx; Anne Will Blankers	Drama		
Johan (2005)	Nicole van Kilsdonk	Johnny de Mol	Drama		Buena Vista International
Lulu (2005)	Victor Nieuwenhuijse; Maartje Seyferth	Vlatka Simac	Drama; Thriller		
Masterclass (2005)	Hans Teeuwen	Pierre Bokma; Peer Mascini	Drama; Comedy		
Offers (2005)	Dana Nechushtan	Jacob Derwig; Maryam Hassouni	Drama	Telefilm	
Diep (2005)	Simone van Dusseldorp	Melody Klaver; Monic Hendrickx	Drama		
De Griezelbus (2005)	Pieter Kuijpers	Willem Nijholt; Angela Schijf; Lisa Smit	Children's film		Warner Bros. Pictures

== 2006 ==
Title	Director	Cast	Category	Notes	Distributor
Langer Licht (2006)	David Lammers	Dai Carter; Raymond Thiry	Drama		
Ik Omhels Je Met 1000 Armen (2006)	Willem van de Sande Bakhuyzen	Tijn Doctor; Carice van Houten	Drama		A-Film Distribution
Het Woeden der Gehele Wereld (2006)	Guido Pieters	Cees Geel; Frank Lammers	Drama		Universal Pictures
Bolletjes Blues (2006)	Birgit Hillenius	rapper Negativ	Drama		Buena Vista International
Het Zwijgen (2006)	Andre van der Hout; Adri Schrover	Vincent Croiset; Susan Visser	Drama		
De Sportman van de Eeuw (2006)	Mischa Alexander	Jochum ten Haaf; Ricky Koole	Drama; Comedy		United International Pictures
Don (2006)	Arend Steenbergen	Clements Levert; Sander Foppele	Teen drama		A-Film Distribution
Eilandgasten (2006)	Karim Traida	Tygo Gernandt; Eva Duijvensteijn	Drama	Telefilm	
Killkenny Cross (2006)	Eric Oosthoek	Marcel Hensema	Drama	Telefilm	
Escort (2006)	Frank Ketelaar	Rifka Lodeizen; Bastiaan Ragas	Drama	Telefilm	
De Uitverkorene (2006)	Theu Boermans	Kees Prins; Monic Hendrickx	Drama	Telefilm	
Zoop in India (2006)	Johan Nijenhuis	Monique van der Werff	Teen	Golden film	Independent Films
Doodeind (2006)	Erwin van den Eshof	Anniek Pheiffer; Victoria Koblenko	Thriller; Horror		RCV Film Distribution
Zwartboek (2006)	Paul Verhoeven	Carice van Houten	Drama; War		A-Film Distribution
Afblijven (2006)	Maria Peters	Sem Veeger; Jim Bakkum	Teen drama		
Sl8n8 (2006) aka Slachtnacht	Frank van Geloven; Edwin Visser	Victoria Koblenko; Kurt Rogiers	Horror		
Nachtrit (2006)	Dana Nechushtan	Frank Lammers; Fedja van Huêt	Drama; Crime		A-Film Distribution
Ober (2006)	Alex van Warmerdam	Alex van Warmerdam	Drama; Comedy		A-Film Distribution
Horizonica (2006)	Ramon Etman	Jenny Hsia	Horror		
Wild Romance (2006)	Jean van de Velde	Daniel Boissevain; Marcel Hensema	Drama	Biopic Herman Brood	Independent Films
Kruistocht in spijkerbroek (2006) aka Crusade in Jeans	Ben Sombogaart	Joe Flynn; Jan Decleir	Drama		Benelux Film Distributors
'n Beetje Verliefd (2006)	Martin Koolhoven	Yes-R	Comedy		RCV Film Distribution
Nu. (2006)	Jan-Willem van Ewijk	Brigitte Baladié; Matthijs Bourdrez	Drama		

== 2007 ==
Title	Director	Cast	Category	Notes	Distributor
Waarom heeft niemand mij verteld dat het zo erg zou worden in Afghanistan (2007)	Cyrus Frisch	Cyrus Frisch	Drama	First feature film shot on mobile phone	
Oliver etc (2007)	Sander Burger	Dragan Bakema; Maria Kraakman	Drama		
Blind (2007)	Tamar van der Dop	Halina Reijn	Drama		Buena Vista International
Ernst, Bobbie, en de geslepen Onix (2007)	Pieter Walther Boer	Erik van Trommel; Hidde Maas	Children's film		Independent Films
Kicks (2007)	Albert ter Heerd	Chantal Janzen	Multiculti drama		
Dennis P. (2007)	Pieter Kuijpers	Edo Brunner; Nadja Hüpscher	Comedy; Crime		RCV Film Distribution
Honeyz (2007)	Tom Six	Monique van de Werff; Anna Speller	Drama; Comedy	Only released on DVD	
HannaHannah (2007)	Annemarie van de Mond	Antonie Kamerling; Maria Kraakman	Drama; Com	Telefilm	
Anna (2007)	Erik Oosthoek	Jelka van Houten; Jochum ten Haaf	Drama	Telefilm	
De Avondboot (2007)	Karim Traida	Gijs Scholten van Aschat; Sascha Visser	Drama	Telefilm	
Eigenheimers (2007)	Pollo de Pimentel	Frank Lammers; Marit van Bohemen	Drama; Comedy	Telefilm	
Zadelpijn (2007)	Nicole van Kilsdonk	Monique van de Ven	Drama	Telefilm	
Zoop in Zuid-Amerika (2007)	Johan Nijenhuis	Monique van de Werff	Teen		Independent Films
Wolfsbergen (2007)	Nanouk Leopold	Fedja van Huêt; Karina Smulders	Drama		
Sextet: de Nationale Bed verhalen (2007)	Eddy Terstall	Katja Schuurman	Comedy; Drama		
Complexx (2007)	Robert Arthur Jansen	Kristen Walraad	Thriller; Horror		
Duska (2007)	Jos Stelling	Gene Berevoets	Comedy; Drama	Opening film, Filmfestival Utrecht	
Timboektoe (2007)	Dave Schram	Bo Maerten; Willem Voogd	Teen drama	Based on the book of Carry Slee	
Tussenstand (2007)	Mijke de Jong	Elsie de Brauw; Marcel Musters	Drama		
Waar is het Paard van Sinterklaas? (2007)	Mischa Kamp	Ebbie Tam; Jan Decleir	Teen		Warner Bros. Pictures
Nadine (2007)	Erik de Bruyn	Monic Hendrickx; Fedja van Huêt	Drama		A-Film Distribution
Alles is Liefde (2007)	Joram Lürsen	Carice van Houten; Paul de Leeuw	Romantic Comedy	over 1 million visitors	A-Film Distribution
Kapitein Rob en het geheim van professor Lupardi (2007)	Hans Pos	Thijs Römer; Katja Schuurman	Action; Adventure		A-Film Distribution
De scheepsjongens van Bontekoe (2007)	Steven de Jong	Peter Tuinman; Thomas Acda	Teen drama Adventure		
Moordwijven (2007) aka De Botox methode	Dick Maas	Bracha van Doesburgh; Sanne Wallis de Vries	Comedy; Crime	Golden film	Independent Films

== 2008 ==
Title	Director	Cast	Category	Notes	Distributor
Bloedbroeders (2008)	Arno Dierickx	Matthijs van de Zande Bakhuysen	Drama	Premiere: 10 January 2008 (Telefilm)	
TBS (2008)	Pieter Kuijpers	Theo Maassen; Lisa Smit	Drama; Crime	Premiere: 24 January 2008	Independent Films
Alibi (2008)	Johan Nijenhuis	Georgina Verbaan; Achmed Akkabi	Comedy	Premiere: 9 February 2008	Independent Films
Tiramisu (2008)	Paula van der Oest	Anneke Blok; Jacob Derwig	Drama	Premiere: 6 March 2008, Blok won the Golden Calf for best actress	A-Film Distribution
Skin (2008)	Hanro Smitsman	Robert Hoogland; Teun Kuilboer	Drama	Premiere: 6 March 2008 (Telefilm)	
Zomerhitte (2008)	Monique van de Ven	Sophie Hilbrand; Waldemar Torenstra	Drama	Premiere: 20 March 2008	
Dunya and Desi (2008)	Dana Nechushtan	Maryam Hassouni; Eva van de Wijdeven	Drama; Comedy	Premiere: 17 April 2008	Independent Films
Morrison krijgt een zusje (2008)	Barbara Bredero	Bracha van Doesburgh; Barry Atsma	Family film	Premiere: 24 April 2008	Warner Bros. Pictures
De Fuik (2008)	Mischa Kamp	Johanna ter Steege; Elske Rotteveel	Drama	Premiere: 15 May 2008 (Telefilm)	
Wijster (2008)	Paula van der Oest	Jaap Spijkers; Roos Netjes	Drama	Premiere: 21 May 2008 (Telefilm)	
De muze (2008)	Ben van Lieshout	Tara Elders; Mattheu Schoenaerts	Drama	Premiere: 22 May 2008	
Hoe overleef ik mezelf? (2008)	Nicole van Kilsdonk	Jade Olieberg; Jolijn van de Wiel	Teen	Premiere: 25 June 2008	Warner Bros. Pictures
Snuf de Hond in oorlogstijd (2008)	Steven de Jong	Tom van Kalmthout; Vivian van Huiden		Premiere: 25 June 2008	
De Brief voor de Koning (2008)	Pieter Verhoeff	Yannick van de Velde, Quinten Schram	Adventure	Premiere: 16 July 2008	
De Zeven van Daran, de strijd om Pareo Rots (2008)	Lourens Blok	Devin de Kock	Family film	Premiere: 18 September; In English, Complete Dutch production	Buena Vista International
Het Echte Leven (2008)	Robert Jan Westdijk	Loes Haverkort; Sallie Harmsen	Drama	Premiere: 25 September 2008, opening film Utrecht Film Festival	
Boat Trip 3D (2008)	Mathijs Geijskes	Paul Geusebroek	Drama	Premiere: September 2008 (shown at Utrecht Film Festival), First Dutch digital 3D short film	
Het Wapen van Geldrop (2008)	Thijs Römer	Thijs Römer; Katja Schuurman	Drama	Premiere: 2 October 2008	
Het zusje van Katia (2008)	Mijke de Jong	Ian Blok; Olga Luizguina	Drama	Premiere: 2 October 2008	A-Film Distribution
Radeloos (2008)	Dave Schram	Marius Gottlieb; Marloes van der Wel	Teen	Premiere: 2 October 2008, boekverfilming Carry Slee	
Anubis en het pad der 7 zonden (2008)	Dennis Bots	Achmed Akkabi; Loek Bernink		Premiere: 8 October 2008 first film based on the Huis Anubis TV series	Independent Films
Sinterklaas en het Geheim van het Grote Boek (2008)	Martijn van Nellestijn	Pamala Teves		Premiere: 8 October 2008	
Bruidsvlucht (2008)	Ben Sombogaart	Willeke van Ammelrooy; Rutger Hauer	Drama	Premiere: 16 October 2008	A-Film Distribution
I Love Dries (2008)	Tom Six	Dries Roelvink	Comedy	Premiere: 20 October 2008, premiered in Motel De Witte bergen and toured around various Van der Valk venues	
Vox Populi (2008)	Eddy Terstall	Tom Janssen; Johnny de Mol	Drama; Comedy	Premiere: 23 October	
Ver van familie (2008)	Marion Bloem	Anneke Grönloh; Terence Schreurs	Drama	Premiere: 23 October 2008, based on the book Ver van Familie of Marion Bloem from 1999	
Oorlogswinter (2008)	Martin Koolhoven	Yorick van Wageningen; Melody Klaver	Drama	Premiere: 27 November	Benelux Film Distributors
Wit Licht (2008)	Jean van de Velde	Marco Borsato	Drama	Premiere: 11 December 2008	

== 2009 ==
Title	Director	Cast	Category	Notes	Distributor
Oogverblindend – Dazzle (2009)	Cyrus Frisch	Georgina Verbaan, Rutger Hauer	Drama	Film premiered on the filmfestival of Rotterdam: 29 January 2009	
Links (2009)	Froukje Tan	Jeroen van Koningsbrugge	Drama; Black Comedy	This film got attention during a broadcast of Pauw & Witteman; Premiere: 22 January 2009	
Kan door huid heen (2009)	Esther Rots	Rifka Lodeizen	Drama	Film was played on the filmfestival of Rotterdam; Premiere: 29 January 2009	
Spion van Oranje (2009)	Tim Oliehoek	Paul de Leeuw	Comedy	Premiere: 5 February 2009	A-Film Distribution
Kikkerdril (2009)	Simone van Dusseldorp	Georgina Verbaan	Children's film	Premiere: 11 February 2009	
Stella's oorlog (2009)	Diederik van Rooijen	Javier de Guzman; Anna Drijver	Drama; War	Premiere: 19 February 2009 also brought out as a Telefilm	
Bollywood Hero (2009)	Diederik van Rooijen	Egbert Jan Weeber	Drama	Premiere: 19 March 2009	
Limo (2009)	Guy Goossens	Meiden van Kus	Children's film	Premiere: 8 April 2009	
Coach (2009)	Joram Lürsen	Anneke Blok; Mark Rietman<Gaite Jansen>	Black Comedy	Premiere: 12 April 2009 (Telefilm)	
Taartman (2009)	Annemarie van de Mondt	Jaap Spijkers	Comedy; Drama	Premiere: 19 April 2009 (Telefilm)	
Lover of loser (2009)	Dave Schram	Gaite Jansen; Martijn Lakemeier; Ruud Feltkamp	Drama	Premiere: 23 September 2009	
De Punt (2009)	Hanro Smitsman	Terence Schreurs; Kees Hulst	Drama	Telefilm	
Carmen van het Noorden (2009)	Jelle Nesna	Tygo Gernandt; Sanguita Akkrum	Drama	Is a remake of the 1919 film Een Carmen van het Noorden	
De Vliegenierster van Kazbek (2009)	Ineke Smits	Sallie Harmsen; Jack Wouterse	Drama		
Atlantis (2009)	Digna Sinke	Valerie Bedier; Cas Enklaar	Drama		
Iep! (2009)	Rita Horst	Huub Stapel			Independent Films
Het Leven uit een dag (2009)	Marc de Cloe	Tygo Gernandt	Drama	Based on the book of A.T.F. van der Heijden	
Witte vis (2009)	Remy van Heugten	Raymond Thiry; Marcel Hensema	Drama	previous title was Schoon schip	
De Storm (2009)	Ben Sombogaart	Sylvia Hoeks; Barry Atsma	Drama	Based on the 1953 North Sea Flood	Universal Pictures
REBUY (2009)	Peter Vlemmix	Patrick Stoof; Diede Zillinger-Molenaar	Comedy		
Weekend (2009)	Mark Weistra	Steve Hooi	Horror; Mystery	Possible opening film of the Utrecht Filmfestival	
De Hel van '63 (2009)	Steven de Jong	Chris Zegers	Drama	Based on the 12th Elfstedentocht from 1963.	
Terug naar de kust (2009)	Will Koopman	Linda de Mol	Drama	2009/2010	
Happy End (2009)	Frans Weisz	Pierre Bokma; Rijk de Gooyer	Drama		
De Indiaan (2009)	Ineke Houtman	Bastiaan Ragas	Family film	Premiere: 9 August 2009	A-Film Distribution
De Laatste Dagen van Emma Blank (2009)	Alex van Warmerdam	Marlies Heuer; Annet Malherbe	Comedy		A-Film Distribution
Milo (2009)	Roel en Berend Boorsma		Drama	In English	
Portable Life (2009)	Fleur Boonman	Vania Rovisco	Biographical film		
Sam's Story (2009)	Miriam Kruishoop	Neve Campbell; Gabriel Macht	Comedy	In English	
Rico's Wings (2009)	Jeroen Krabbé	Jeroen Krabbé	Drama	In English; based on the book of Rasha Peper	
Sinterklaas en de Verdwenen Pakjesboot (2009)	Martijn van Nellestijn	Inge Ipenburg; Hetty Heyting; Pamela Teves	Family film	7 October 2009	
De Zeven Dagen van Den Uyl (2009)	Hans Hylkema		Drama		
Zwart Water (2009)	Elbert van Strien	Hadewych Minis; Barry Atsma	Thriller		
Lenteveld (2009)	Lennard Cozijn	Sophie Jonker; Tamar Tieleman	Horror		
The Blue Horse (2009)	Roald van der Laan	Haruka Sugihara; Jasper Tonnon; Terrence Sinclair	Horror	In English	
