= Hans de Wolf =

Dutch television, documentary and film producer

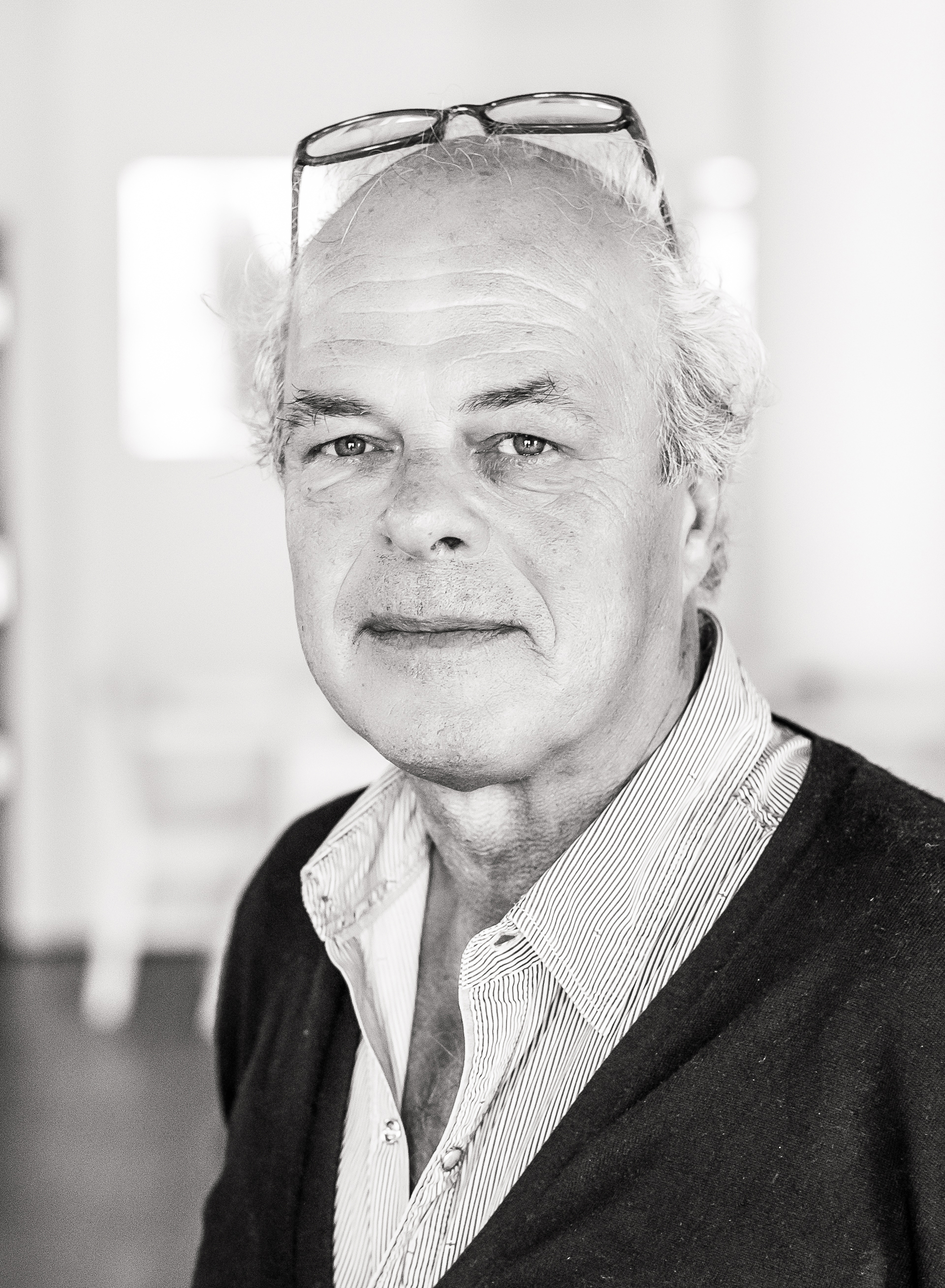
- Hans de Wolf in 2016
- Born: 12 February 1955 (age 71); The Hague, Netherlands
- Occupations: Film producer, Television producer
- Years active: 1981 – 2021
- Notable work: The Pointsman; Nynke; Nena; Soof, Soof 2; Beyond Sleep

Hans de Wolf (born 12 February 1955) is a Dutch television, documentary, and film producer from The Hague.

== Career ==
He has worked as a guest tutor at the Netherlands Film Academy and the Maastricht Academy of Dramatic Arts. From 1985 to 1989, he was the director of the Netherlands Film Festival.

In 1990, he co-founded the production company Bergen Film & Television with George Brugmans and Hans de Weers. Bergen produced Antonia's Line, which won the Academy Award for Best Foreign Language Film at the 68th Academy Awards.

== KeyFilm ==
From 2008 to 2021, de Wolf was the co-founder and producer at KeyFilm, a production company he established with Hanneke Niens.

== Awards ==
Hans de Wolf has won numerous awards as both an individual producer and as part of KeyFilm.

Notable recognitions include:

- The Prix Europa Television Programme of the Year for the telemovie Chopsticks (1996)
- The Golden Calf for Best long feature film for Nynke (2001)
- Two Platinum Film awards for the box office hits Soof and Soof 2.

== Selected filmography ==
=== Feature films ===
- The Pointsman (1986) – screenplay
- Antonia's Line (1995)
- The Stowaway (1997)
- Nynke (2001)
- Oysters at Nam Kee's (2002)
- Johan (2005)
- Duska (2007)
- Katia's Sister (2008)
- Richting west (2010)
- Silent City (2012)
- Soof (2013)
- Nena (2014)
- Ventoux (2015)
- Ya tayr el tayer (The Idol) (2015)
- Beyond Sleep (2016)
- Kamp Holland (2016)
- Soof 2 (2016)
- Craving (2017)
- The Reports on Sarah and Saleem (2018)
- The Beast in the Jungle (2019)
- Tench (2020)
- The Warden (2020)

=== Television ===
- Chopsticks (1995) – screenplay
- Mates (1999)
- Ochtendzwemmers (2001)
- De ordening (2003)
- Bluebird (2004)
- Maite was hier (2009)
- Bowy is binnen (2012)
- Soof: A New Beginning (two seasons, 2017–2018)
- Swanenburg (2021)

=== Documentaries ===
- Ave Maria – Van dienstmaagd des heren tot koningin van de hemel (2006)
- This Is My Picture When I Was Dead (2010)
- De man met 100 kinderen (2012)
- Ik ben Alice (2015)
- Erbarme dich (2015)
