= KeyFilm =

Film & television company in the Netherlands

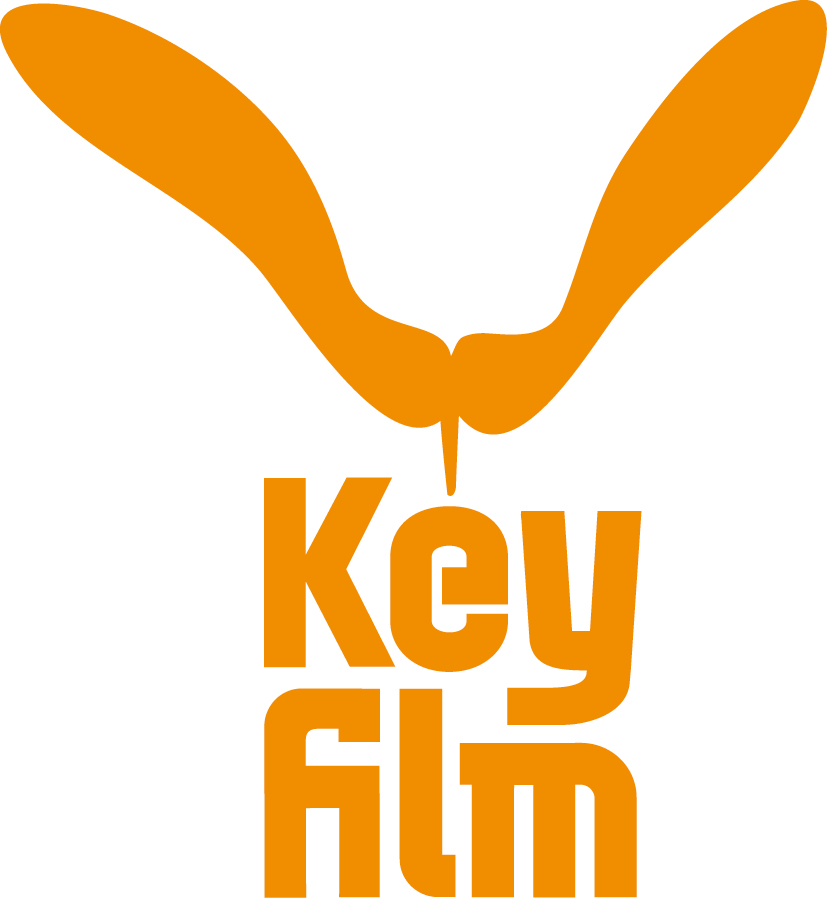
- Type: Private
- Industry: Entertainment
- Founded: 2008 in Amsterdam, Netherlands
- Founders: Hanneke Niens, Hans de Wolf
- Headquarters: Amsterdam, Netherlands
- Area served: Worldwide
- Products: Motion pictures Documentaries; Dramaseries
- Owner: Hanneke Niens
- Website: keyfilm.nl/en/

KeyFilm is an Oscar nominated Dutch production company based in Amsterdam with an extensive international network of co-producers and financiers, and teams up with partners like ITVS, Eurimages, the British Film Institute, Al Jazeera, Netflix, RTL, NPO and many European broadcasters, funds, distributors and sales agents. Founder Hanneke Niens is experienced in co-producing with Europe, the Middle East and Australasia and (co-)produced over 20 drama series and 40 feature films with her team.

== Awards ==
Many films received various (inter)national awards among which an Academy Award nomination Best foreign language film for Twin Sisters (2004), an International Emmy Award for telemovie De uitverkorene (The Chosen One) (2006) and the Prix Europa for Television Programme of the Year for De uitverkorene (The Chosen One) and Cloaca.

Notable box office hits were Twin Sisters, Bride Flight, Soof, Soof 2, Soof 3, So What is Love and Honestly, I'm Fine. In addition, films were selected for the international film festivals of Berlin (Nena), Toronto (Unfinished Sky, The Idol), San Sebastián (Godforsaken, Silent City), Venice (Queens) and International Film Festival Rotterdam (Family, Craving, Night of a 1000 Hours, The Beast in the Jungle, Beyond Sleep, Tench, A House in Jerusalem). In 2018 the international co-production The Reports on Sarah and Saleem won the Special Jury Award for Best Scenario and the HBF Audience Award on the International Film Festival Rotterdam. In 2021 Swanenburg was the most streamed series on NPO.

== Selected filmography ==
- Honestly, I'm Fine (2026)
- Last Call (2024)
- Just Like in the Movies (2023)
- Line of Fire (2023)
- Lost Transport (2023)
- A House in Jerusalem (2023)
- Soof 3 (2022)
- Queens (2022)
- Swanenburg (two seasons, 2021-2023)
- The Warden (2020)
- Tench (2020)
- Dreamlife (2020)
- So What Is Love (2019)
- The Beast in the Jungle (2019)
- The Reports on Sarah and Saleem (2018)
- Soof: A new Beginning (two seasons, 2017-2018)
- Craving (2017)
- Soof 2 (2016)
- Night of a 1000 Hours (2016)
- Beyond Sleep (2016)
- The Idol (2015)
- Ventoux (2015)
- Nena (2014)
- Soof (2013)
- Silent City (2012)
- Richting West (2010)
- Bollywood Hero (2009)
- The Dark House (2009)
