= All Inclusive =

All Inclusive may refer to:

- All Inclusive (2008 film), a Chilean-Mexican film
- All Inclusive (2011 film), a Russian film
- All Inclusive (2014 film), a Danish film
- All Inclusive (2019 film), a French film
- All Inclusive (2023 film), a Dutch film
- All-inclusive resort, a type of vacation resort
- All Inclusive, a show jumper ridden by Ludger Beerbaum in the 2008 Olympic games.
