= Nadine (2007 film) =

2007 drama film by Erik de Bruyn

- Theatrical release poster
- Directed by: Erik de Bruyn
- Written by: Gwen Eckhaus; Erik de Bruyn
- Produced by: Erik Schut
- Starring: Monic Hendrickx; Sanneke Bos; Halina Reijn
- Cinematography: Bert Haitsma
- Edited by: Sander Kuipers
- Music by: David van der Heyden
- Production companies: Rocketta Film; Serendipity Films; Filbox produções
- Distributed by: A-Film Distribution
- Release date: 25 October 2007 (Netherlands)
- Running time: 100 minutes
- Countries: Netherlands; Belgium
- Languages: Dutch; English; Portuguese
- Budget: €2 million
- Box office: $12,905

Nadine is a 2007 Dutch road movie drama film directed by Erik de Bruyn from a script he co-wrote with Gwen Eckhaus and starring Monic Hendrickx, Sanneke Bos and Halina Reijn. It follows a career woman named Nadine, who is played by the three lead actors at three different life stages of her life, the story starts when the oldest (Hendrickx) kidnaps a baby and goes on a road trip towards Portugal.

Nadine had its premiere on September 29 at the Netherlands Film Festival. At the International Filmfestival Mannheim-Heidelberg, the film was the opening film and would later debut in Dutch theaters on October 25, 2007.

== Cast ==
- Monic Hendrickx as Nadine, 40 years old
  - Sanneke Bos as Nadine, 36 years old
  - Halina Reijn as Nadine, 32 years old
- Mano Tzoulakis as Sam
- Fedja van Huêt as Daniel
- Frank Lammers as Vince
- Rifka Lodeizen as Felice
- Hadewych Minis as Aimee
- Marleen Scholten as Julia
- Michel van Dousselaere as Nadine's father
- Beppie Melissen as Nadine's mother
- Tine Laureyns as Nurse Sofia

== Production ==
The idea for Nadine started shortly after the release of de Bruyn's Wild Mussels, according to him when he just turned 40 years old and in his friend group there were a number of highly educated independent women, who became suddenly interested in having children when they turned forty. He started delving into the subject himself, which was fueled by his own feelings around mortality. He co-wrote the first draft with Marion Bloem, the decision to cast three women for the same character was established early in development.

The film was supposed to be an international co-production with various production companies across Europe, but these plans were dropped after two years. Production started with an allocated budget of two million euro, but was only made with 1,5 million. On first day of filming in Portugal, the car that was used in the film was involved in a crash, the crew member involved only suffered minor injuries.

== Release ==
Nadine had its premiere on September 29 at the Netherlands Film Festival. The film was the opening film at the International Filmfestival Mannheim-Heidelberg. It was shown in Dutch cinemas on October 25, 2007.
