= Mohammed Chaara =

Moroccan-Dutch television and film actor

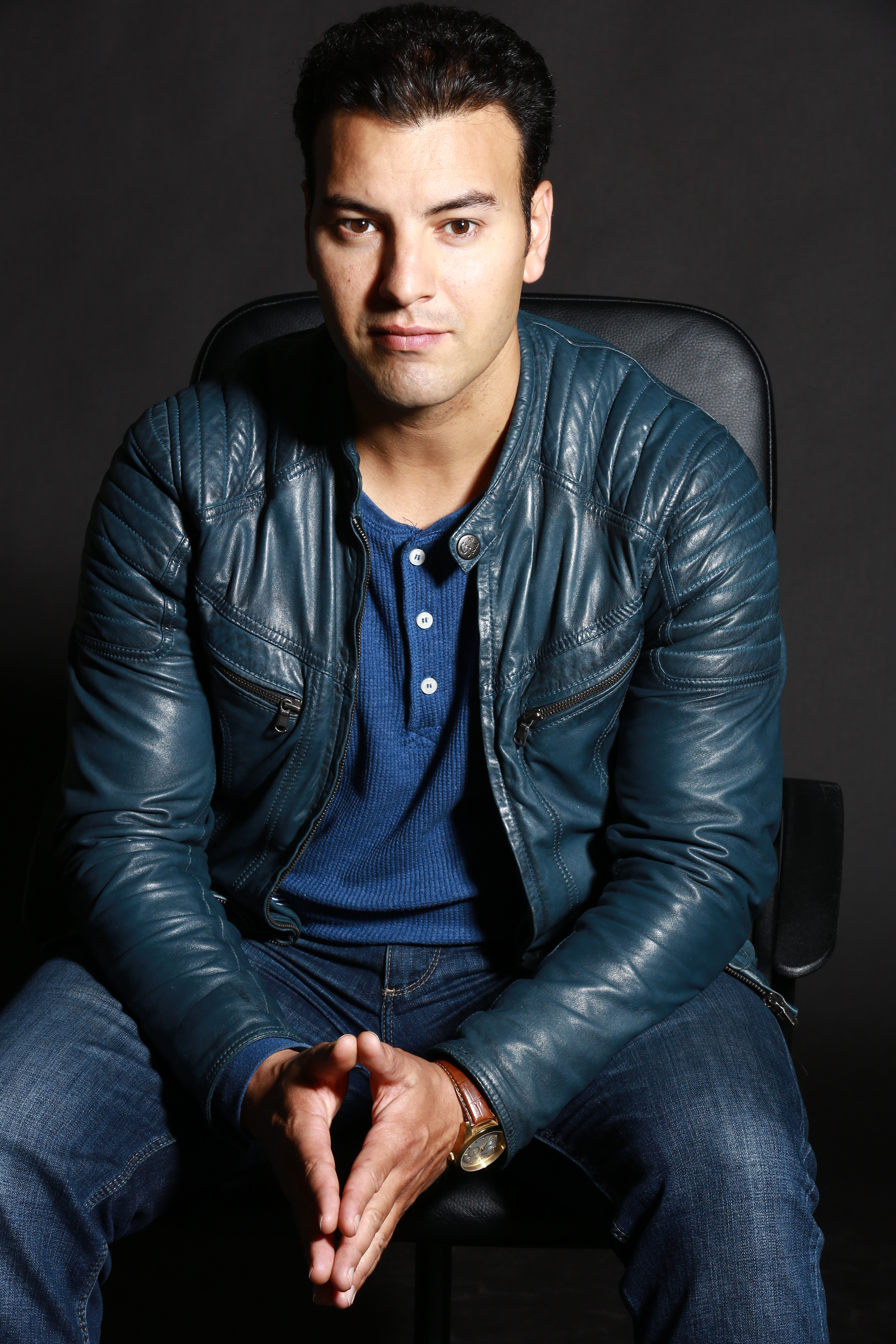
- Born: Mohammed Chaara; 16 August 1980 (age 45); Amsterdam, The Netherlands
- Occupation: Actor
- Years active: 1996–

Mohammed Chaara (born 16 August 1980 in Amsterdam, The Netherlands) is a Moroccan-Dutch television and film actor. Chaara started his career in soap opera Goudkust as "Samir" and is best known for his appearances in films Hush Hush Baby and Schnitzel Paradise. Chaara is a Muslim.

== Films ==
- 1999 De straat is van ons (The street is ours)
- 2002 Oysters at Nam Kee's
- 2004 Shouf Shouf Habibi! (Hush Hush Baby)
- 2005 Zwarte Zwanen (Black Swans)
- 2005 Het schnitzelparadijs (Schnitzel Paradise)
- 2006 Nachtrit (Night Ride)
- 2007 Kicks
- 2011 Broeders - Mimo

== Television ==
- 2000-2001 Goudkust (Goldcoast)
- 2001 Spangen
- 2002 Costa!
- 2002 Hartslag I (Heartbeat I)
- 2003 Hartslag II (Heartbeat II)
- 2004 Missie Warmoesstraat (Mission Warmoesstraat)
- 2005 Baantjer
- 2005 Alex FM
- 2006-2007 Shouf Shouf! de serie deel I (Hush Hush the series part I)
- 2007 Shouf Shouf! de serie deel II (Hush Hush the series part II)
- 2009 Shouf Shouf! de serie deel III (Hush Hush the series part III)
- 2011 De Pelgrimscode - candidate
- 2014 Popooz
- 2015 Voetbalmeisjes - Choukri

== Presentations ==
- 2007: Planet Europe (NPS) - central presentation
- 2008: In de buurt (AT5) - presentator

== Theater ==
- 2012: Ik Driss - Mustapha (Moes)
- 2014: Kapsalon de comedie - Abdeltief (Ab)
- 2015 Kapsalon de comedie reprise

== Regie ==
- 2008: Is Normaal toch - Amersfoort
- 2010: Samira The Movie - Amsterdam Transvaal
- 2011: Ede the Movie - Ede- Veldhuizen
