= Roelvink =

Roelvink is a Dutch surname. Notable people with the surname include:

- Dries Roelvink (born 1959), Dutch singer
- Mirte Roelvink (born 1985), Dutch footballer
