= Hanneke Niens =

Dutch TV and film producer (born 1965)

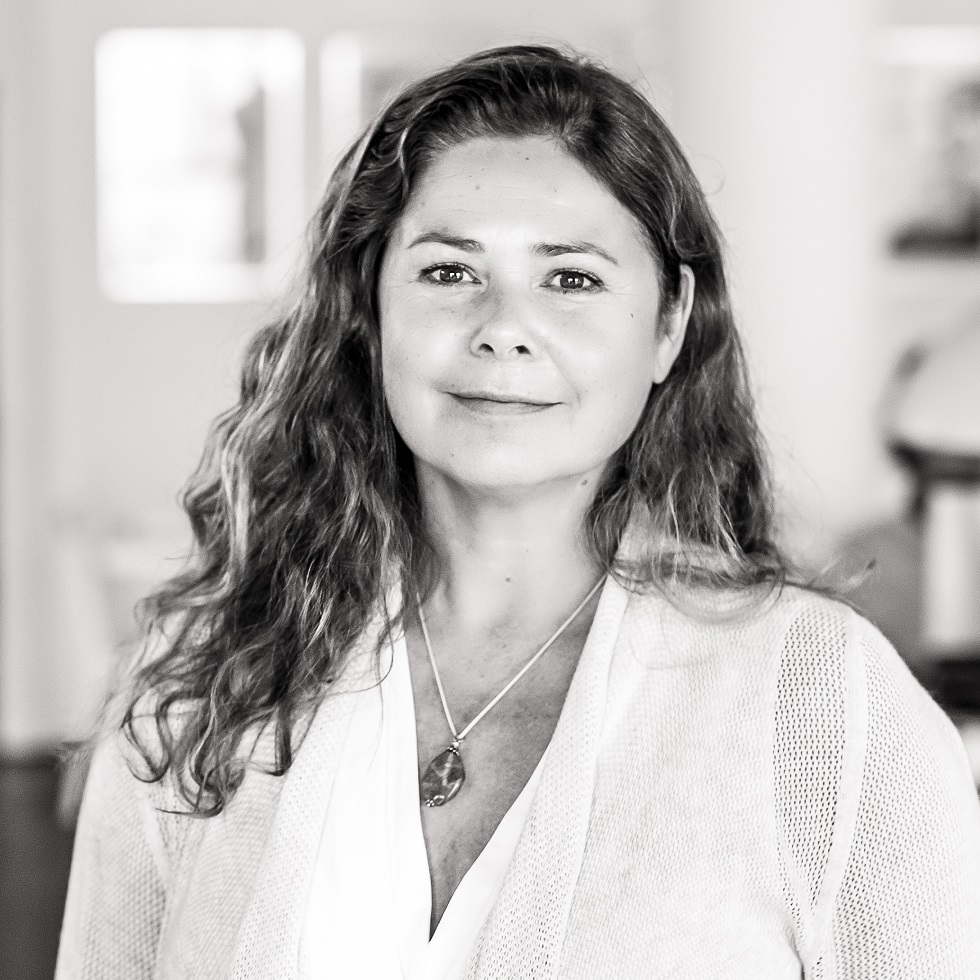
- Occupations: Film producer, television producer
- Years active: 1999 – present
- Notable work: Twin Sisters; Cloaca; Godforsaken; Soof; Soof 2; Soof 3; De Vuurlinie
- Website: Official website

Hanneke Niens is a Dutch Oscar nominated producer of films, dramaseries and documentaries and owner and CEO of the production company KeyFilm (2008–present). She incidentally guest tutored at the Netherlands Film Academy and the international audiovisual organization EAVE.

During her career Hanneke Niens won numerous awards both as producer and with her companies. Notable awards are the Golden Calf Best long feature film for De Tweeling (Twin sisters) (2003), an Academy Award nomination Best foreign language film for De Tweeling (2004) and the Prix Europa Television Programme of the Year for the telemovie De uitverkorene (The Chosen One) (2006) and the Prix Europa Special for Cloaca (2005). In 2007 Pierre Bokma won an International Emmy Award for his role in this movie. Box office hits Soof, Soof 2 and Soof 3 were all awarded the Platinum Film. In 2018 her international co-production The Reports on Sarah and Saleem won the Special Jury Award for Best Scenario and the HBF Audience Award on the International Film Festival Rotterdam.
Her films have been selected for the international A-festivals Hot Docs, IDFA, Berlinale, San Sebastián, Toronto, Venice and Rotterdam. In 2021 Swanenburg was the most streamed series on NPO.

Hanneke is member of the European Producers Club, European Film Academy and served on the Supervisory Board of the International Film Festival Rotterdam from 2019 to 2025. From 2004 to 2010, she also was board member of Film Producers Netherlands (now named NAPA).

== Selected filmography ==
=== Feature films ===
- Honestly, I'm Fine (2026)
- Last Call (2024)
- Just Like in the Movies (2023)
- Line of Fire (2023)
- Lost Transport (2023)
- A House in Jerusalem (2023)
- Queens (2022)
- Soof 3 (2022)
- Huda's Salon (2021)
- The Warden (2020)
- Tench (2020)
- So What Is Love (2019)
- The Beast in the Jungle (2019)
- The Reports on Sarah and Saleem (2018)
- Craving (2017)
- Soof 2 (2016)
- Night of a 1000 Hours (2016)
- Camp Holland (2016)
- Beyond Sleep (2016)
- Ya tayr el tayer (The Idol) (2015)
- Ventoux (2015)
- Nena (2014)
- Soof (2013)
- Silent City (2012)
- Heading West (2010)
- The Dark House (2009)
- Bollywood Hero (2009)
- Bride Flight (2008)
- Unfinished Sky (2007)
- A Thousand Kisses (2006)
- Life! (2005)
- Cloaca (2003)
- Godforsaken (2003)
- Twin Sisters (De Tweeling) (2002)
- Baby (2002)
- Family (2001)

=== Television ===
- Swanenburg (2021-2023)
- Soof: een nieuw begin (two seasons, 2017–2018)
- Voices of Finance (2015)
- Greifensee (2013)
- Exit (2013)
- Bowy is binnen (2012)
- Uit (2012)
- Over (2012)
- One False Move (2011)
- Coup de Grâce (2011)
- Flysk (2010)
- Verre vrienden (2010)
- Memory Lane (2010)
- Val (2010)
- Diamond Dancers (2010)
- Hyperscape (2010)
- Zara (2009)
- De Ander (2009)
- Maite was here (2009)
- De fuik (2008)
- Hou Holland schoon (2008)
- Den Helder (2008)
- Dag in dag uit (2008)
- De avondboot (2007)
- The Chosen One (2006)
- Escort (2006)
- On Stage (2005)
- Eilandgasten (2005)
- Zinloos (2004)
- Oud Geld (1998-1999)

=== Documentaries ===
- Mies gaat naar Hollywood (2016)
- De mooiste marathon (2016)
- Erbarme dich (2015)
- Ik ben Alice (2015)
- Becoming Zlatan (2015)
- Herinnering aan een trieste dageraad (2014)
- Paradijsbestormers (2014)
- My Genius Brother Harry (2013)
- Refugees: Who Needs Them? (2013)
- Gitaarjongens (2013)
- Niets blijft (2012)
- De man met 100 kinderen (2012)
- Nadia's tics (2011)
- What the cat sees (2011)
- This is my picture when I was dead (2010)
- Great Lengths (2010)
