= Michiel de Ruyter (film) =

2015 film

- Dutch film poster
- Directed by: Roel Reiné
- Screenplay by: Lars Boom; Alex van Galen; Michael Loumeau
- Produced by: Klaas de Jong
- Starring: Frank Lammers; Barry Atsma; Egbert-Jan Weber
- Cinematography: Roel Reiné
- Edited by: Radu Ion
- Music by: Trevor Morris
- Production companies: Farmhouse Film & TV
- Distributed by: A-Film Benelux
- Release dates: 26 January 2015 (world premiere); 29 January 2015 (Netherlands)
- Running time: 130 minutes
- Country: Netherlands
- Languages: Dutch; English; French
- Budget: €8 million
- Box office: €5.7 million

Michiel de Ruyter (Dutch pronunciation: [miˈxil də ˈrœytər]) is a 2015 Dutch biographical war drama film about the 17th-century admiral Michiel de Ruyter directed by Roel Reiné. The film had its world premiere in the Nederlands Scheepvaartmuseum in Amsterdam on 26 January 2015 and has been released in cinemas in the Netherlands on 29 January 2015. On the English promotional website, the film has the title Admiral.

== Synopsis ==
When England and France wage war on the republic of The Netherlands, Naval commander Michiel de Ruyter is called upon to lead the Dutch fleet in a battle for freedom and unity.

== Cast ==
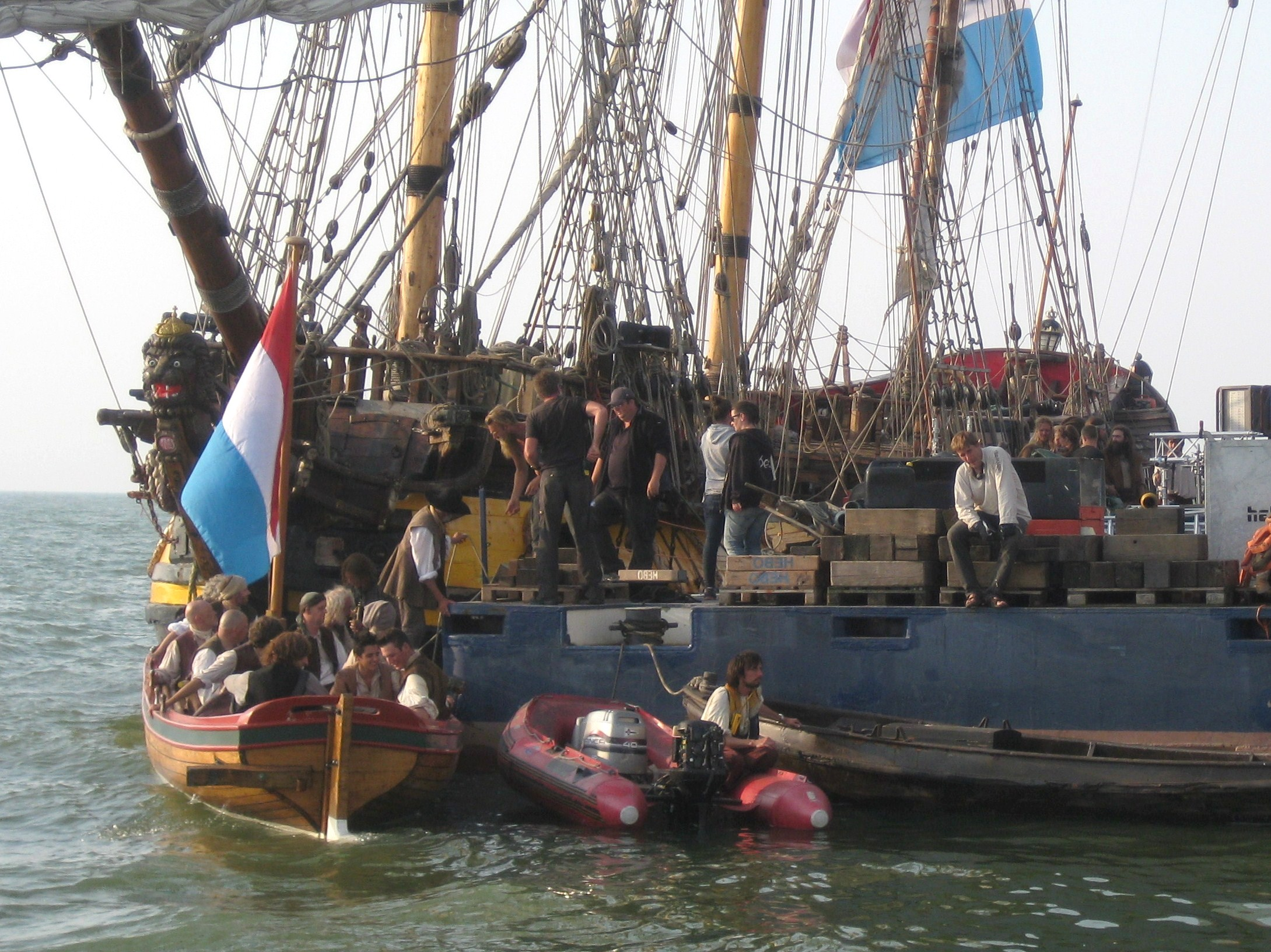
Director Roel Reiné (center, wearing a hat) with cast and crew members at the film set in 2014

The first choice for the title role was Yorick van Wageningen, but he could not come to a financial agreement with the producers. On 9 May 2014, the full cast was presented to the press.

- Frank Lammers as Michiel de Ruyter
- Barry Atsma as Johan de Witt
- Egbert-Jan Weber as William III
- Gene Bervoets as Van Ginneken
- Jada Borsato as Neeltje de Ruyter
- Will Bowden as Prince Rupert of the Rhine
- Daniel Brocklebank
- Hajo Bruins as Cornelis Tromp
- Jules Croiset
- Charles Dance as Charles II
- Lukas Dijkema
- Roeland Fernhout as Cornelis de Witt
- Tygo Gernandt as Joseph van Ghent
- Rutger Hauer as Maarten Tromp
- Jelle de Jong
- Joost Koning
- Youval Kuipers
- Isa Lammers
- Sanne Langelaar as Anna de Ruyter
- Lieke van Lexmond as Wendela de Witt
- Derek de Lint as Johan Kievit
- Victor Löw as De Waerd
- Aurélie Meriel
- Filip Peeters as Abraham Duquesne
- Pip Pellens
- Bas van Prooijen
- Nils Verkooijen
- Viv Weatherall

== Production ==
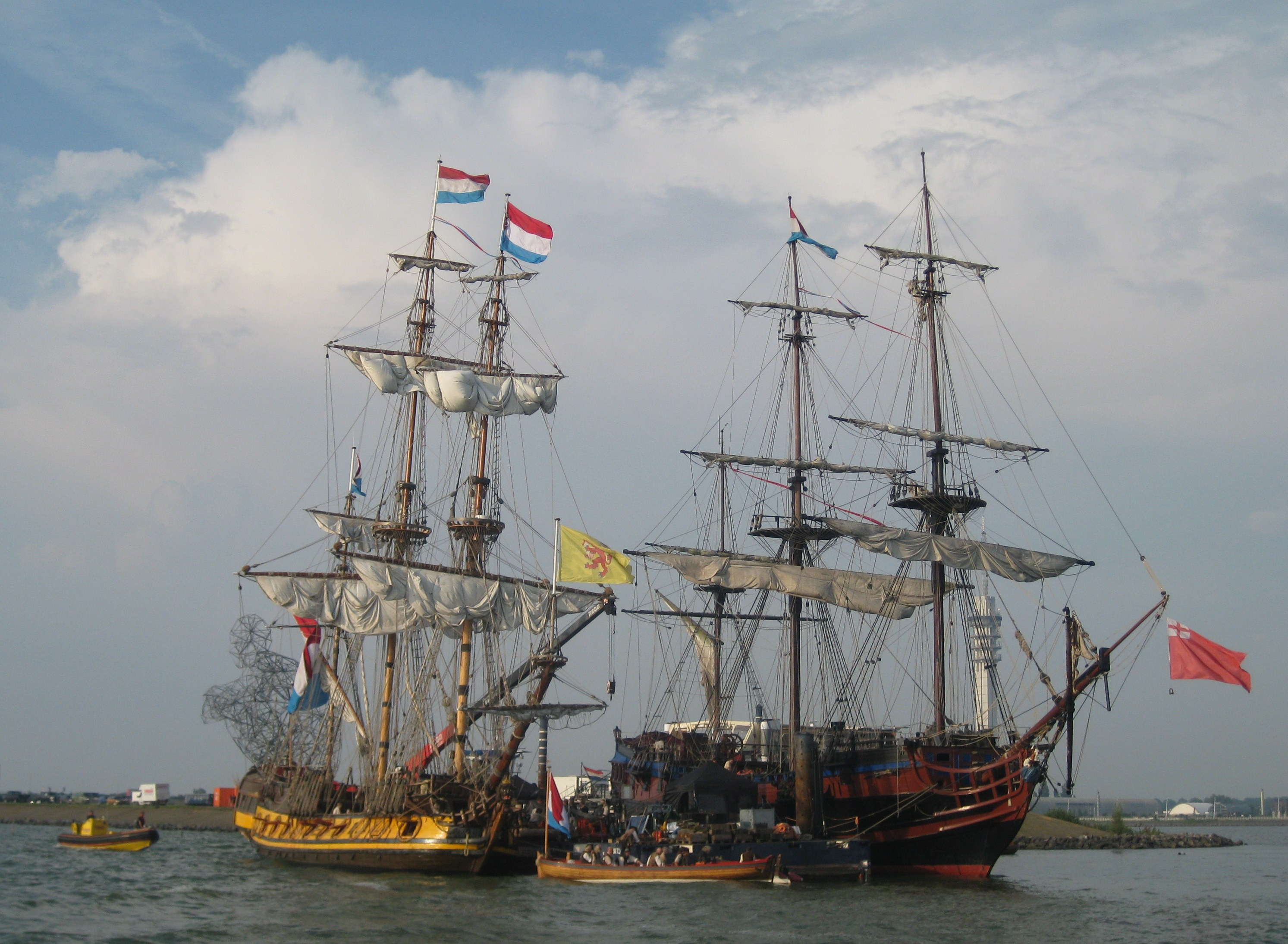
Film set of Michiel de Ruyter near Lelystad in the Netherlands with the frigate Shtandart

The film was directed by Roel Reiné and produced by Klaas de Jong. It had a budget of 8 million euro. Among the film locations are Zeeland, Texel, the Wadden Sea, and the Ridderzaal.

== Reception ==
=== Pre-release ===
Prior to its release, several protest groups had accused the film of glorifying the colonial history of the Netherlands although references to colonialism in the film are almost absent. The film makes a minor reference to the Dutch East India Company, which contributed highly to the welfare of a small group of wealthy merchants in the 17th century in the Low Countries, and to the trading vessels that were protected by the navy under Michiel de Ruyter. The film's main subjects, apart from Ruyter himself, are the internal politics of the country and the oligarchy that formed the ruling class at the time, including the brutal murder of Johan de Witt and the complicated relationship with England, up to the engagement of the William III of Orange with the English princess Mary.

=== Post-release ===
On Rotten Tomatoes, the film has an approval rating of 67% based on six reviews, with an average rating of 6.6/10. In a review for the Los Angeles Times, Robert Abele writes: "With loving shots of booming, towering ships so dominant, and decades squeezed into what feels like a week of action, there's barely enough time to develop De Ruyter as a character in his own movie, or even successfully explain his war strategies."

== Awards ==
- Golden Film for 100,000 visitors
- Platinum Film for 400,000 visitors

== See also ==
- Anglo-Dutch Wars
- Franco-Dutch War
- Four Days' Battle
