= Ares (TV series) =

Dutch television series

- Release poster
- Genre: Horror; Drama; Supernatural
- Created by: Pieter Kuijpers; Iris Otten; Sander van Meurs
- Written by: Winchester McFly; Michael Leendertse; Thomas van der Ree; Joost Reijmers; Matthijs Bockting; Pieter van den Berg; Sarah Offringa
- Directed by: Giancarlo Sanchez; Michiel ten Horn
- Starring: Jade Olieberg; Tobias Kersloot; Lisa Smit; Robin Boissevain
- Country of origin: Netherlands
- Original language: Dutch
- No. of seasons: 1
- No. of episodes: 8

Production
- Executive producers: Pieter Kuijpers; Iris Otten; Sander van Meurs
- Camera setup: Single-camera
- Running time: 30 minutes
- Production company: Pupkin

Original release
- Network: Netflix
- Release: January 17, 2020

Ares is a Dutch horror drama television series, created by Pieter Kuijpers, Iris Otten and Sander van Meurs. The series stars Jade Olieberg, Tobias Kersloot, Lisa Smit and Robin Boissevain. The series premiered on Netflix on 17 January, 2020.

== Premise ==
The first series follows Rosa Steenwijk, a first-year medical student in Amsterdam, as she joins the secretive student society Ares and slowly learns what they really are.

== Cast ==
- Jade Olieberg as Rosa Steenwijk
- Tobias Kersloot as Jacob Wessels
- Lisa Smit as Carmen Zwanenburg
- Robin Boissevain as Roderick van Hall
- Frieda Barnhard as Fleur Borms
- Hans Kesting as Maurits Zwanenburg
- Rifka Lodeizen as Hester de Hoogh
- Roos Dickmann as Puk
- Jip van den Dool as Arnold Borms
- Steef de Bot as Joost van Moerland
- Janni Goslinga as Joyce Steenwijk
- Dennis Rudge as Wendel Steenwijk
- Minne Koole as Henry Zwanenburg
- Jennifer Welts as Marije
- Florence Vos Weeda as Chloe
- Nils Verkooijen

== Episodes ==
No.	Title	Directed by	Written by	Original release date
1	"Episode 1"	Unknown	Unknown	17 January 2020
A young woman in The Netherlands goes off to college in Amsterdam. She joins a student society, undergoes a hazing and has a romance with a male society member. But after he rapes her, she graphically kills herself inside the society building using scissors. Elsewhere, the biracial first year medical student Rosa is intrigued by her longtime friend Jacob's involvement with Ares, an exclusive student society. Against Jacob's urgings, Rosa seeks out the society and consents to being recruited as their "novice". She, Jacob and a group of others are transported to the Ares society building to undergo hazing. Meanwhile, Rosa's mother harms herself during a psychotic episode as Rosa is not there to watch for her.
2	"Episode 2"	Unknown	Unknown	17 January 2020
Rosa stands out as the only novice not from a well-known, rich family. She and the other novices are hazed by the society president, Joost, and his girlfriend Carmen. Jacob gets cold feet and runs off. He has visions of a black, oily-looking monstrous figure deep down in the building and burns his fingers on a strange wall, before being found and brought back by Rosa. The novices are branded with Ares insignia, finalizing their initiation. Joost is called by Carmen's father, Maurits Zwanenburg, who congratulates Joost and asks if "it was mad", referring to the creature down below.
3	"Episode 3"	Unknown	Unknown	17 January 2020
Jacob's injured fingers have turned black. The novices adapt to life inside the student society. Rosa is allowed to visit the hospital where her mother is staying, where her father admonishes her for not being there for her family. Jacob is interrogated by the society about his fears and insecurities. Later, the novices attend a high society party at the house of a celebrated neuroscientist, Hester de Hoogh. At the party, Jacob touches Joost with his blackened fingers, leading Joost to experience visions of a man he killed. Carmen insists that Rosa take hard drugs; Rosa subsequently has sex with two older society members, a guy and a girl. By morning, she discovers Joost dead in the shower, having disemboweled himself with a broken wine bottle.
4	"Episode 4"	Unknown	Unknown	17 January 2020
Mr. Zwanenburg decides to cover up Joost's death, rather than admit there was another suicide within Ares. Rosa goes along in the cover-up, convincingly lying to Joost's parents. She is rewarded with another novice's internship spot at the research facility of Hester de Hoogh, but then throws up a large amount of black liquid. Carmen assures her it's fine. Jacob shakes his blackened hand with Arnold, the new society president, leading Arnold to flash back to his murder of a young woman inside the Ares building, followed by a strange ritual of Arnold throwing up a black egg. In the present, Jacob is seen trying to break through the wall he injured his fingers on.
5	"Episode 5"	Unknown	Unknown	17 January 2020
In a flashback, Mr. Zwanenburg recalls a ceremony in his teenage years where he threw up a black egg inside the Ares building, while facing an old woman in chains. In the present, Carmen and Rosa dispose of Rosa's black bile in a drain in a hidden society room. Arnold is tormented by visions of the girl he murdered, culminating in his suicide by hanging in the Ares building's attic. Rosa starts her internship with Hester, who offers to "remove" Jacob from Ares if he's bothering Rosa. Rosa accepts the offer, but Hester is ambushed by Jacob and touched by his blackened hand before she can tell Mr. Zwanenburg about him. The next day, Hester commits suicide by posing as a corpse and then stabbing herself with a scalpel during her "autopsy."
6	"Episode 6"	Unknown	Unknown	17 January 2020
Hester's death is covered up as an accident resulting from a psychotic episode. Arnold's corpse is discovered. Rosa returns home to her angry father and has a vision of the black creature from the Ares basement invading her house. Carmen takes Rosa to see her mother, Joyce, in the hospital. Joyce recognizes Carmen and panics, revealing that she was once engaged to Carmen's father, Mr. Zwanenburg, and that Joyce was an Ares member too. She warns Rosa not to go back to Ares because of Beal, the creature they keep in the building's basement. A confused Carmen admits that she doesn't know everything about Ares. Rosa then realizes that Jacob is in danger.
7	"Episode 7"	Unknown	Unknown	17 January 2020
A strange old woman in Ares captivity urges Mr. Zwanenburg to make Rosa the new society president, but he is reluctant and offers the position to Carmen first. Carmen fails her presidential test, which consists of killing a prenatal baby by shutting off its incubator. Elsewhere, Rosa finds Jacob in the Ares basement, where he tells her that he will free Beal. Rosa tries to flee Ares but is attacked by Fleur, the vengeful sister of Arnold, who blames Rosa for the recent string of suicides. In the ensuing fight, Rosa nearly kills Fleur, piquing the interest of the Ares society elders, but stops short at Jacob's urging. Jacob is then taken into custody by Ares security.
8	"Episode 8"	Unknown	Unknown	17 January 2020
The Ares elders ask Rosa to stab and kill Jacob. She reluctantly does so and ascends to the presidency. Rosa asks to see Beal, but Mr. Zwanenburg reveals that "Beal" is really a black whirlpool of bile representing all the violent secrets puked out by Ares members, whom he implies have been pulling the strings of Dutch society for centuries. Rosa refuses to add her bile to the whirlpool, instead choosing to fall into it. As she re-emerges covered in black bile, imagery of the Dutch slave trade and Dutch colonialism flashes by. Rosa makes her way through the Ares building causing dozens of members to commit suicide. Finally, Rosa's father enters the building, finds his daughter and embraces her.

== Production ==
=== Development ===
On 12 February, 2019, it was announced that Netflix had given the production a series order for a 8-episode first season. The series is created by Pieter Kuijpers, Iris Otten and Sander van Meurs, who are also credited as producers. Production companies involved with the series were slated to consist of Pupkin.

=== Casting ===
Alongside the initial series announcement, it was confirmed that Jade Olieberg, Tobias Kersloot, Lisa Smit, Robin Boissevain, Roos Dickmann, Jip van den Dool, Steef de Bot, Janni Goslinga, Dennis Rudge, Minne Koole, Jennifer Welts and Florence Vos Weeda had been cast in the series.

== Release ==
=== Premiere ===
On 13 December, 2019, Netflix released the official trailer for the series. The series premiered on 17 January, 2020
