= The Stowaway (1997 film) =

De Verstekeling
- Directed by: Ben van Lieshout
- Written by: Bert Bisperink, Ben van Lieshout
- Produced by: Hans de Weers; Hans de Wolf
- Starring: Bekzod Mukhammadkarimov; Ariane Schluter; Rick van Gastel
- Cinematography: Stef Tijdink
- Edited by: René Wiegmans
- Music by: Harry de Wit
- Release date: October 1997
- Running time: 90 minutes
- Country: Netherlands
- Language: Dutch

The Stowaway or De Verstekeling is a 1997 Dutch film directed by Ben van Lieshout.

== Cast ==
- Bekzod Mukhammadkarimov as Orazbai (as Bekhzod Mukhamedkarimov)
- Ariane Schluter as Katharina
- Rick van Gastel as Maarten
- Dirk Roofthooft as Zeeman
- Sjamoerat Oetemratov as Vader
- Culnar Aidzjanava as Aydin
- Karamat Primbetov as Iso
- Leda Elueva as Bibigul
- Roef Ragas as Collega zeeman
- Ad van Kempen as Kapitein
- Hans Magnus as Vreemdelingenpolitie
- Ruurt de Maesschalck as Vreemdelingenpolitie
- Hans Hausdörfer as Havenpolitie
- Tjerk Risselada as Werfarbeider
- Stef van der Eijnden as Rozenkweker
