= J. Kessels =

2015 film

- Film poster
- Directed by: Erik de Bruyn
- Written by: Jan Eilander
- Starring: Frank Lammers
- Release dates: 23 September 2015 (Nederlands Film Festival); 1 October 2015
- Running time: 105 minutes
- Country: Netherlands
- Language: Dutch

J. Kessels is a 2015 Dutch drama film directed by Erik de Bruyn. It was based on the book of the same J. Kessels: The Novel name by P. F. Thomése. It was listed as one of eleven films that could be selected as the Dutch submission for the Best Foreign Language Film at the 89th Academy Awards, but it was not nominated.

The film was the opening film of the 2015 Netherlands Film Festival.

== Cast ==
- Fedja van Huêt as Frans
- Frank Lammers as Kessels
- Ruben van der Meer as Boontje
- Livia Matthes as Sabine
