= Manslaughter (2012 film) =

Dutch thriller film

- Theatrical release poster
- Directed by: Pieter Kuijpers
- Screenplay by: Marcel Lenssen
- Produced by: Pieter Kuijpers; Sander van Meurs; Iris Otten
- Starring: Theo Maassen; Gijs Scholten van Aschat
- Cinematography: Mick van Rossum
- Edited by: Annelien van Wijnbergen
- Music by: Stuurbaard Bakkebaard
- Production companies: Pupkin; Human TV
- Distributed by: Independent Films
- Release date: 3 January 2012
- Running time: 81 minutes
- Country: Netherlands
- Language: Dutch
- Box office: $705,949

Manslaughter (Dutch: Doodslag) is a 2012 Dutch thriller film directed by Pieter Kuijpers. It stars Theo Maassen and Gijs Scholten van Aschat.

== Synopsis ==
Ambulance driver Max has been a paramedic for twenty years. When he and his new colleague, Amira, are called to an emergency one day, their ambulance is blocked by a group of Dutch-Moroccan youths who refuse to budge. Max gets out and eventually knocks one of the boys down, killing him. Max goes to prison, and after completing his sentence, he tries to resume his life, but his former colleagues avoid him. In addition, the friends of the deceased boy have not forgotten about Max.

== Cast ==
- Theo Maassen as Max
- Gijs Scholten van Aschat as Felix
- Maryam Hassouni as Amira
- Mamoun Elyounoussi as Achmed
- Najib Amhali as Father of Mo
- Jeffrey Hamilton as Patrick
