= Ad van Kempen =

Dutch actor (1944–2026)

- Born: 12 July 1944
- Died: 5 January 2026 (aged 81)

Adrianus Petrus Johannes Maria (Ad) van Kempen (12 July 1944 – 5 January 2026) was a Dutch actor. He appeared in more than 40 films beginning in 1974.

Van Kempen died of prostate cancer in Amsterdam on 5 January 2026 at the age of 81.

== Selected filmography ==
Film
Year	Title	Role	Notes
2008	Winter in Wartime		
2006	'N Beetje Verliefd		
1999	Jacky		
1997	The Stowaway		
1994	1-900		
