= Tom Egbers =

Dutch journalist and TV presenter

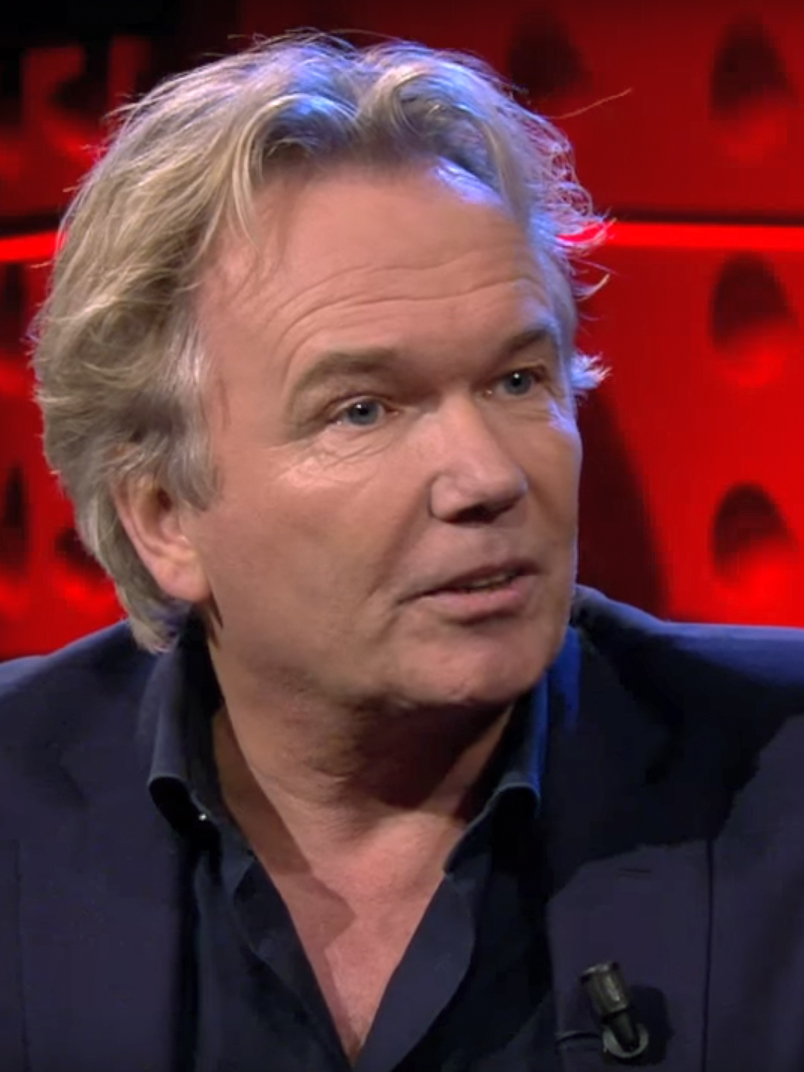
- Born: 18 October 1957 (age 68); Almelo, Netherlands
- Occupation: Television presenter
- Known for: Studio Sport

Tom Egbers (Dutch pronunciation: [tɔm ˈɛɣbərs]; 18 October 1957) is a Dutch journalist of Irish descent, writer and TV presenter (Studio Sport) since 1985. He studied at the School voor de Journalistiek in Utrecht, and was employed at Studio Sport (NOS) in 1984 as presenter. Between 1990 and 1992 Egbers worked for Veronica. He has written a book, The Black Meteor, about black footballer Steve Mokone that has been made into the film The Black Meteor.
