= Arend Steenbergen =

Dutch director and screenwriter (born 1965)

- Born: 27 March 1965 (age 60); Nimègue, Netherlands
- Occupations: Director and screenwriter

Arend Steenbergen (born 27 March 1965 in Nimègue), is a Dutch director and screenwriter.

== Awards ==
- 2014: Film Award of the City of Utrecht for Twee dromen

== Filmography ==
- 1993 : De vader van Najib
- 1998 : Temmink: The Ultimate Fight
- 2000 : Nacht in de stad
- 2004 : Twee dromen
- 2004 : Milan en de zielen
- 2005 : Zwarte zwanen
- 2006 : Don
- 2008 : Grandma's House
- 2010 : 6 tips om de beste voetballer van de wereld te worden
