= Mimoun Oaïssa =

Moroccan-Dutch actor (born 1975)

- Born: Mimoun Oaïssa; 11 March 1975 (age 51); Beni Said, Morocco
- Occupations: Actor, screenwriter
- Years active: 1994–
- Awards: 2005 Golden Calf for Best Supporting Actor

Mimoun Oaïssa (born 11 March 1975) is a Moroccan-Dutch actor and screenwriter.

== Education and career ==
He was born in Beni Said, Nador Province, Morocco and graduated from Amsterdam Theatre School in 1999 and followed acting lessons abroad. He was a stage actor from 1998 till 2001 and then quit to start acting on screen. His major films include Hush Hush Baby and Schnitzel Paradise. For his role in the latter he won the 2005 Golden Calf Award for Best Supporting Actor.

== Filmography ==
=== Film ===
- 1994 De andere kant van de tunnel (The Other End of the Tunnel)
- 1996 De Jurk (The Dress)
- 1996 Marrakech
- 2001 De Vriendschap
- 2002 De enclave (The Enclave)
- 2003 So be it
- 2003 Polleke
- 2004 Shouf Shouf Habibi! (Hush Hush Baby)
- 2005 Het schnitzelparadijs (Schnitzel Paradise)
- 2007 Weddings and Beheadings
- 2007 Kicks
- 2008 Lezione 21
- 2009 Amsterdam
- 2011 The Devil's Double (Ali)
- 2012 De Marathon (The Marathon) (Youssoef)
- 2015 De Masters (Aziz)

=== Television ===
- 1999 Novellen: De dag, de nacht en het duister (Novellas: The Day, The Night and The Darkness)
- 1999 Quidam, Quidam
- 2000 Russen (Russians; Bargoens for inspector)
- 2001 Wet & Waan (Law and Delusion)
- 2002 De vloer op (To The Floor)
- 2002 Polonaise
- 2002 Kwartelhof
- 2002 Intensive Care
- 2003 Dwaalgast (Wanderguest)
- 2005 Costa!
- 2005 Spoorloos verdwenen (Lost without a trace)
- 2006 Rauw (Raw)
- 2006–2009 Shouf shouf! (Hush Hush)
