= Honestly, I'm Fine =

- Dutch: PAAZ
- Directed by: Anne de Clercq
- Based on: PAAZ by Myrthe van der Meer
- Produced by: Hanneke Niens
- Starring: Gaite Jansen; Jonas Smulders; Georgina Verbaan; Gijs Blom; Bianca Krijgsman; Martin van Waardenberg
- Music by: Alexander Reumers
- Production company: KeyFilm
- Distributed by: Dutch FilmWorks
- Release date: 26 February 2026
- Country: Netherlands
- Language: Dutch

Honestly, I'm Fine (Dutch: PAAZ) is a 2026 Dutch film.

The film is based on the novel PAAZ by Myrthe van der Meer. In the Dutch language, Paaz is the abbreviation form of "Psychiatrische Afdeling Algemeen Ziekenhuis", which means "Psychiatric Department of a General Hospital".

== Cast ==
The film is directed by Anne de Clercq and main actors are Gaite Jansen, Georgina Verbaan, Jonas Smulders and Bianca Krijgsman.

== Plot ==
Emma believes she has everything in order: a successful career, a fulfilling relationship, and a stable life. That changes when she unexpectedly ends up in a psychiatric ward. What begins as a mistake becomes a confronting journey through vulnerability, control, and self-perception.

== Reception ==
Editor Floortje Smit from De Volkskrant gave four of five stars to the film. Smit wrote, "Paaz is a warm, not-quite-too-cheerful film about psychological problems. Actress Gaite Jansen strikes exactly the right tone as the patient Emma."
