= Soof =

2013 Dutch comedy film

- Film poster
- Directed by: Antoinette Beumer
- Produced by: Ada Goossens; Hanneke Niens; Hans de Wolf
- Starring: Lies Visschedijk; Fedja van Huêt
- Edited by: Marc Bechtold
- Production companies: KeyFilm; Millstreet Films
- Distributed by: Independent Films
- Release date: 12 December 2013
- Running time: 76 minutes
- Country: Netherlands
- Language: Dutch
- Box office: $8,829,814

Soof is a 2013 Dutch comedy film directed by Antoinette Beumer.

== Cast ==
- Lies Visschedijk as Soof
- Fedja van Huêt as Kasper
- Dan Karaty as Jim
- Lobke de Boer as Sascha
- Anneke Blok as Hansje
- Chantal Janzen as Bob
- Alex Klaasen as Harm Jan
- George van Houts as Jan Jaap
- Maryam Hassouni as Najat
- Eva Laurenssen as Gaby
- Dick van den Toorn as Gerrit

== See also ==
- Soof 3 (2022 film)
