= Ochtendzwemmers =

2000 film

- Directed by: Nicole van Kilsdonk
- Written by: Mieke de Jong
- Produced by: Hans de Weers; Hans de Wolf
- Release date: 2000
- Running time: 90 minutes
- Country: Netherlands
- Language: Dutch

Ochtendzwemmers is a 2000 Dutch film directed by Nicole van Kilsdonk.

== Plot ==
Every morning a fixed group of people use the local swimming pool. None of the regulars know each other, only by sight. However, the police suspect that the swimmers are part of a criminal organisation, and one morning, conduct a raid on the pool. One of the main suspects is Loes, who takes her story to the detective, her story seems to resolve the whole thing, but then she is accused of being a racist.

== Cast ==
- Ricky Koole - Loes
- Daniël Boissevain - Bing
- Felix Burleson - Ampie Sylvester
- Viggo Waas - Frankie
- Adriaan Olree - Dhr. Te Bokkel
- Tatum Dagelet - Tanja
- Frank Lammers - Herman
- Olga Zuiderhoek - Moeder Bakker
- Edwin Jongejans - Chris de Vis
- Josh Meyer - Kenneth
