= Schnitzel Paradise =

2005 Dutch comedy film

- Theatrical release poster
- Directed by: Martin Koolhoven
- Screenplay by: Marco van Geffen
- Based on: Het Schnitzelparadijs by Khalid Boudou
- Produced by: Joost de Vries; Leontine Petit
- Starring: Mounir Valentyn; Bracha van Doesburgh; Mimoun Oaïssa
- Cinematography: Guido van Gennep
- Edited by: Job ter Burg
- Music by: Melcher Meirmans; Merlijn Snitker; Chrisnanne Wiegel
- Production companies: Lemming Film; NPS
- Distributed by: Independent Films
- Release date: 8 September 2005
- Running time: 82 minutes
- Country: Netherlands
- Languages: Dutch; Arabic

Martin Koolhoven's Schnitzel Paradise (Dutch: Het Schnitzelparadijs) is a 2005 Dutch comedy film about Dutch-Moroccan Nordip Dounia who starts working in a restaurant kitchen and falls in love with Agnes Meerman, niece of the hotel's manager. Nordip has to overcome not only Agnes's family's prejudices but also his father's wishes as to his future.

The film was a huge success in The Netherlands, attracting nearly 342,000 visitors in 2005, and becoming the highest grossing Dutch film in 2005.

== Plot ==
After obtaining his school diploma, Nordip looks for a vacation job and is hired as a dishwasher at hotel restaurant 'De Blauwe Gier'. In the kitchen, Nordip encounters people of various different cultures, including two bickering Moroccans, a well-meaning Turk, a hardrocker chef, and his sadistic sous-chef right hand man. Nordip also falls in love with Agnes, the hotel owner's niece.

== Cast ==
- Mounir Valentyn as Nordip Dounia
- Bracha van Doesburgh as Agnes Meerman
- Mimoun Oaïssa as Amimoen
- Yahya Gaier as Mo
- Tygo Gernandt as Goran
- Gürkan Küçüksentürk as Ali
- Micha Hulshof as Sander
- Frank Lammers as Willem
- Sabri Saad El-Hamus as Mr. Doenia
- Nezha Karim as Mrs. Doenia
- Mohammed Chaara as Nadir Dounia
- Linda van Dyck as Nina Meerman
- Sanne Vogel as Claudia

== Awards ==
- Film Discovery Jury Award - U.S. Comedy Arts Festival - Won
- Best Performance in a Foreign Film won by Micha Hulshof
- Golden Film (100,000 visitors) - Won
- Skip City International D-Cinema Festival Award for Best Screenplay - Won
- Golden Calf for Best Director - Nominated
- Golden Calf for Best Editing - Nominated
- Golden Calf for Best Production Design - Nominated
- Golden Calf for Best Supporting Actor - Won

The Best Supporting Actor Golden Calf was shared by supporting actors Yahya Gaier, Tygo Gernandt, Micha Hulshof, Gürkan Küçüksentürk and Mimoun Oaïssa

== See also ==
- List of Dutch films of 2005
