= Pieter Kuijpers =

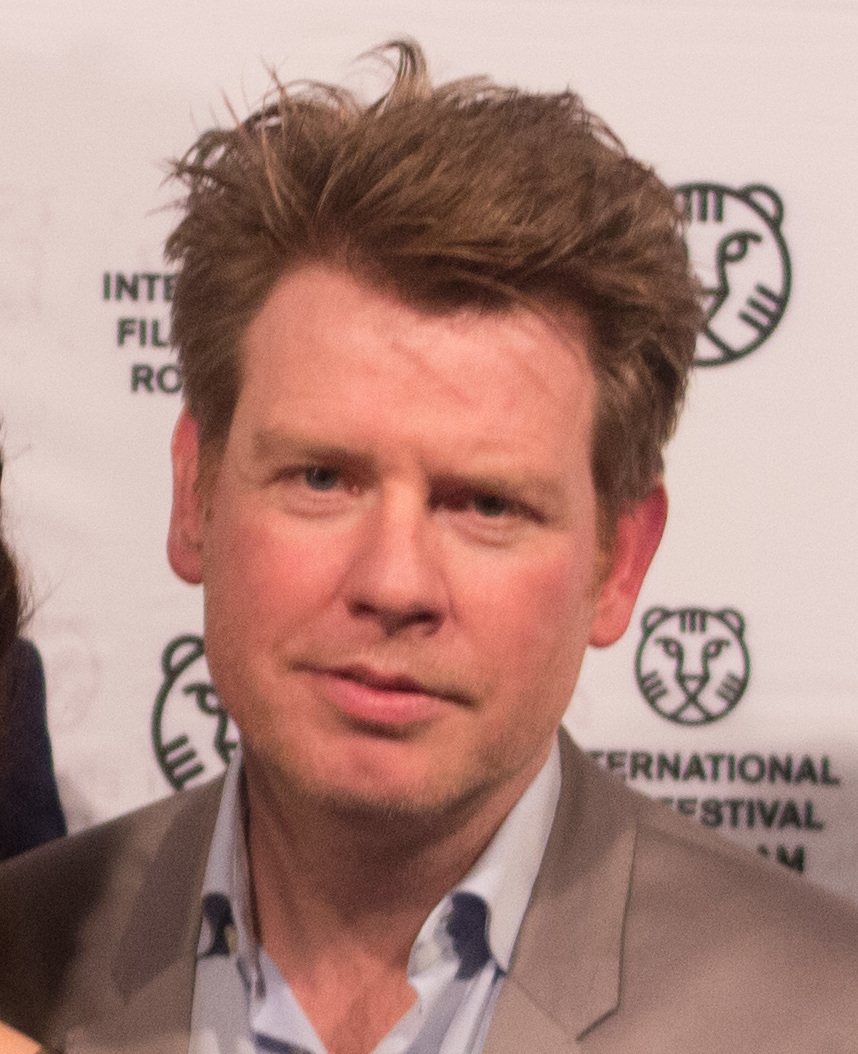
- Born: Pieter Kuijpers; 30 July 1968 (age 57); Netherlands, Tegelen
- Citizenship: Dutch
- Occupations: Film director, film producer, screenwriter
- Years active: 1995 – present

Pieter Kuijpers (born 30 July 1968, Tegelen) is a Dutch film director, producer and screenwriter.

== Films ==
- Darkling (1995)
- Godforsaken (Van God Los, 2003)
- The Archives (De Ordening, 2003)(TV)
- Off Screen (2005)
- Gruesome School Trip (De Griezelbus, 2005)
- Dennis P. (2007)
- Nothing to Lose (2008)
- Manslaughter (Doodslag, 2012)
- Love is the Word (2013)
- Riphagen (2016)

== TV series ==
- 12 steden, 13 ongelukken (1990)
- Westenwind (1999)
- Finals (2000)
- Ares (2020)

== Awards and nominations ==
- 2003 - Golden Calf Best Film & Best Screenplay, Nederlands Film Festival, for Godforsaken
- 2012 - Nomination Golden Calf Beste Director, Nederlands Film Festival, for Hemel op Aarde
- 2013 - Nomination Magnolia Award, Shanghai International TV Festival, for Manslaughter
- 2016 - ShortCutz Amsterdam Career Achievement Award
