= Nena (film) =

2014 film

- Film poster
- Directed by: Saskia Diesing
- Written by: Saskia Diesing; Esther Gerritsen
- Produced by: Hanneke Niens; Hans de Wolf
- Starring: Abbey Hoes; Uwe Ochsenknecht; Gijs Blom
- Cinematography: Aage Hollander
- Music by: Paul Eisenach
- Distributed by: Cinéart
- Release date: 11 September 2014
- Running time: 90 minutes
- Countries: Germany; Netherlands
- Languages: Dutch; German

Nena is a 2014 German-Dutch romantic drama film directed by Saskia Diesing from a script she co-wrote with Esther Gerritsen that was given 2014 Golden Calf awards for best director and best actress, and was noted with a special mention at the 2015 Berlinale. The film's North American premiere was celebrated at the Mill Valley Film Festival in San Rafael, California, on 16 October 2015. Set in the Netherlands in 1989, the film is inspired by Diesing's own experiences of adolescence, as well as her father's battle with multiple sclerosis.

== Cast ==
- Abbey Hoes as Nena
- Gijs Blom as Carlo
- Uwe Ochsenknecht as Martin, Nena's father
- Monic Hendrickx as Martha, Nena's mother
- André Jung as Paul
- Magdalena Helmig as Nurse
- Jelmer Ouwerkerk as Catcher
