= All Inclusive (2023 film) =

2023 Dutch film directed by Aniëlle Webster

- Film poster
- Directed by: Aniëlle Webster
- Starring: Jennifer Hoffman; Frank Lammers; Aiko Beemsterboer
- Distributed by: WW Entertainment
- Release date: 16 March 2023
- Country: Netherlands

All Inclusive is a 2023 Dutch comedy film directed by Aniëlle Webster. Jennifer Hoffman, Frank Lammers and Aiko Beemsterboer play roles in the film.

The film finished in 8th place in the list of best visited Dutch films of 2023 with just over 200.000 visitors.

== Awards and nominations ==
The film won the Golden Film award after having sold 100,000 tickets.
