= Nothing to Lose (2008 film) =

2008 Dutch psychological thriller film

- Theatrical release poster
- Directed by: Pieter Kuijpers
- Written by: Pieter Kuijpers; Paul Jan Nelissen
- Produced by: Pieter Kuijpers; Sander van Meurs; Andre Teelen
- Starring: Theo Maassen; Lisa Smit
- Cinematography: Bert Pot
- Edited by: Annelien van Wijnbergen
- Music by: Het Paleis van Boem
- Production companies: Pupkin Film; BNN
- Distributed by: Independent Films
- Release date: 24 January 2008
- Running time: 90 minutes
- Country: Netherlands
- Languages: Dutch; French
- Box office: $1.2 million

Nothing to Lose (Dutch: TBS) is a 2008 Dutch psychological thriller film written and directed by Pieter Kuijpers and co-written by Paul Jan Nelissen.

Independent Films released the film in Dutch cinemas on 24 January 2008, where it received mixed reviews from critics.

== Cast ==
- Theo Maassen as Johan
- Lisa Smit as Tessa
- Sacha Bulthuis as Johan's Mother
- Pim Lambeau as Johan's grandmother
- Bob Schwarze as Joska

== Release ==
The film was released on DVD by Warner Home Video on 11 June 2008.
