= Erik de Bruyn =

Dutch film director and actor

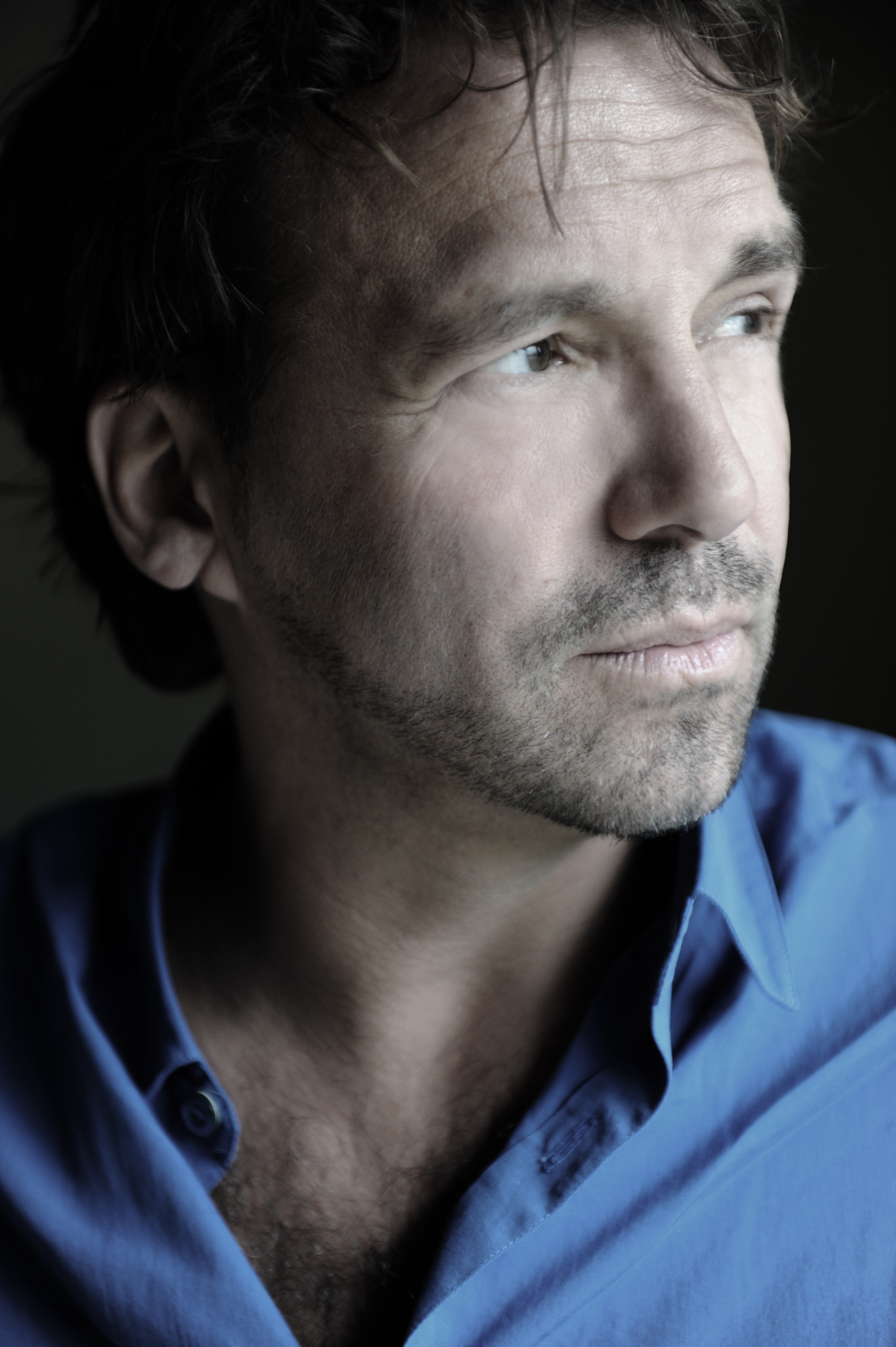
- Born: 27 October 1962 (age 63); Terneuzen, Zeeland, Netherlands
- Occupations: Film director, actor
- Years active: 1990-present

Erik de Bruyn (born 27 October 1962) is a Dutch film director and actor. His 2000 film Wild Mussels was entered into the 23rd Moscow International Film Festival.

== Selected filmography ==
- Mates (1999)
- Wild Mussels (2000)
- Nadine (2007)
- J. Kessels (2016)
- Het Hart of Hadia Tromp (2017)
