= Hush Hush Baby =

2004 Dutch comedy film

- Theatrical release poster
- Directed by: Albert ter Heerdt
- Written by: Albert ter Heerdt
- Produced by: René Huybrechtse; Joram Willink; Frank Bak
- Starring: Mimoun Oaïssa; Salah Eddine Benmoussa
- Cinematography: Steve Walker
- Edited by: Sytste Kramer
- Music by: Vincent van Warmerdam
- Production companies: Theorema Films; VARA
- Distributed by: Universal Pictures; Independent Films
- Release date: 29 January 2004
- Running time: 84 minutes
- Country: Netherlands
- Language: Dutch
- Budget: €680.000
- Box office: $2,801,588

Hush Hush Baby (Dutch: Shouf Shouf Habibi!) is a 2004 Dutch comedy film written and directed by Albert ter Heerdt. The film follows a Moroccan family that tries to find their way in Dutch society.

== Plot ==
Abdullah 'Ap' Bentarek is a young Moroccan man, about 20 years old. He is happy that, unlike his Uncle Yusuf who stayed in the ancestral Moroccan mountain village, his own father, Ali, moved to the Netherlands. His mother knows only one sentence in Dutch, which she utters every time, and in a strong Moroccan accent: "Is goed" ("It's OK"). His father doesn't speak or understand Dutch at all.

He has, however, a tough choice to make. Either he can choose a modern Dutch lifestyle, playing some pool with his lousy friends and lead a life like his sister Leila does—Leila refuses to be married off and takes off her hijab often when attending school—or he can do what his father wants him to do: 'become serious', find a job and choose a bride in Morocco.

His older brother Sam is a policeman and is very well integrated into Dutch society. He gets Ap an office job, at a bank he and his friends have dreamt of robbing, but Ap lasts only a day there. He then chooses to join his friends in the attempt to break into the bank. The attempt, however, fails miserably.

Meanwhile, his little brother Driss blackmails their sister Leila and other Muslim girls at his school, by taking pictures of them when they have taken off their hijab in school. His grades are low, but his parents don't know of that. When his father has to come over to discuss his grades, Driss accompanies him as his interpreter. Everything the teacher tells about his grades and his behaviour is not translated by him: instead, he tells his father his teacher thinks he is a brilliant student. The scheme fails when the conversation is overheard by a Moroccan cleaner who intervenes.

When Ap is heading for trouble, he decides to follow his father's advice and become 'serious'. He sets off for Morocco to find a bride, but if that is the right choice for him is uncertain.

== Themes & Impact ==
Shouf Shouf Habibi! is widely recognized for its candid and humorous exploration of the cultural identity crisis faced by second-generation Moroccan immigrants in the Netherlands. The film delves into the tension between traditional Moroccan values—represented by the expectations of the protagonist Ap's father—and the realities of modern Dutch society.

== Awards and nominations ==
The film was a critical and commercial success in the Netherlands and received recognition at several international film festivals:

- Golden Film (2004): Awarded for reaching 100,000 tickets sold in the Netherlands.
- Netherlands Film Festival (2004):
  - Winner: Golden Calf for Best Editing (Gouden Kalf voor Beste Montage) – J.P. Luijsterburg.
  - Nominated: Golden Calf for Best Director – Albert ter Heerdt.
  - Nominated: Golden Calf for Best Production Design – Marco Rooth.
- Berlin International Film Festival (2004):
  - Participated in the Panorama section.
- Warsaw International Film Festival (2004):
  - Nominated: Grand Prix – Albert ter Heerdt.

== Cast ==
- Mimoun Oaïssa as Ap
- Salah Eddine Benmoussa as Ali
- Zohra 'Flifla' Slimani as Khadija
- Najib Amhali as Sam
- Iliass Ojja as Driss
- Tanja Jess as Maja
- Frank Lammers as Chris
- Mimoun Ouled Radi as Rachid
- Mohammed Chaara as Mussi
- Leo Alkemade as Robbie
- Winston Gerschtanowitz as Daan
- Tara Elders as Britt
- Bridget Maasland as Carlie

== Production ==
Since January 2006, Dutch broadcasting organisation VARA began broadcasting Shouf Shouf! de serie. In this series, most of the main cast is the same as in the film. The series has been directed by Tim Oliehoek.

== Reception ==
The movie became one of the most successful Dutch comedy productions ever. Reactions from the Moroccan community however were mixed: on one hand, Moroccan youths claimed the movie, comparing themselves to the main characters; on the other hand, the movie received criticism for being stereotypical and giving an overall negative impression of Moroccan immigrant families.
