= Steve Mokone =

South African footballer

Personal information
- Full name: Stephen Madi Mokone
- Date of birth: 23 March 1932
- Place of birth: Doornfontein, South Africa
- Date of death: 19 March 2015 (aged 82)
- Place of death: Washington, D.C., USA
- Position: Striker

Youth career
- Pretoria Home Stars

Senior career*
Years	Team	Apps	(Gls)
1955–1957	Coventry City	4	(1)
1957–1959	Heracles		(15)
1959	Cardiff City	3	(1)
1959–1960	Barcelona	0	(0)
1960	→ Marseille (loan)	0	(0)
1960–1961	Torino	0	(0)
1961–1962	Valencia	0	(0)
1963	Hamilton Steelers		
1964	Sunshine George Cross	15	(10)

International career
1948–1964	South Africa Black XI		

Managerial career
- 1963: Hamilton Steelers
- 1964: Sunshine George Cross
- * Club domestic league appearances and goals

Stephen Madi Mokone OIG (23 March 1932 – 19 March 2015) was a South African footballer who was the first black South African player to play in a professional European league.

He was nicknamed The Black Meteor and Kalamazoo.

== Early years ==
Mokone was born in Doornfontein, a suburb of Johannesburg, but his family moved to Sophiatown before settling in Kilnerton in Pretoria.

== Club career ==
Mokone attracted much attention in his native South Africa, making his debut for a South Africa Black XI at the age of just 16. The Durban Bush Bucks player was close to signing for English side Newcastle United but for the intervention of his father, who wished him to continue his studies. Mokone began his professional career in 1955 with English side Coventry City, where he made four league appearances, scoring one goal in the process. Although his stay at Coventry was a short one, he was the first Black footballer to play for them in the Football League. He later played in the Netherlands with Heracles Almelo, for whom he scored twice at his debut and won the 1958 Tweede Divisie title to become a club legend. He was the first foreign professional player in Dutch football. A stand in Heracles' Polman Stadion is named after him.

He later joined Cardiff City, making a goalscoring debut on the opening day of the 1959–60 season on 22 August 1959 during a 3–2 victory over Liverpool. He made just two more league appearances for the side, before being signed in 1959 by Spanish side FC Barcelona. However, because Barcelona had filled their quota of foreign players, he was loaned to French side Marseille. Mokone later played in Italy for Torino and in Spain for Valencia CF, before finishing his career in Canada in the Eastern Canada Professional Soccer League with the Hamilton Steelers, where he served as a player-coach, and in Australia with Sunshine George Cross.

== After football ==
In 1964 Mokone moved to the United States. There he was convicted and imprisoned for separate felony assaults committed in 1977 against his then wife, Joyce Maaga Mokone, and the 34-year-old female attorney who was representing Joyce Mokone in divorce and custody proceedings at the time. On 31 October 1978, Mokone pleaded guilty in Superior Court of Middlesex County New Jersey to the crime of atrocious assault for having personally attacked his wife with lye on 20 November 1977. He was subsequently sentenced to serve between 8 and 12 years in New Jersey State Prison. In 1980 Mokone stood trial in New York County, New York, accused of having orchestrated an attack on his wife's lawyer, Ann Boylan Rogers, in which sulfuric acid was thrown in her face outside her home in Manhattan on 8 October 1977. Rogers was left seriously disfigured and blind in one eye. Mokone was found guilty of Assault in the First Degree in May 1980 and later sentenced to serve 5 to 15 years in New York State Prison after having completed his New Jersey sentence. He was released from custody in August 1990. Mokone consistently denied his guilt and claimed that he had been specifically targeted due to his links to the left-wing, anti-apartheid ANC, who were considered a terrorist group by the CIA. Tom Egbers, in investigating the case, noted the specific and suspicious interference of both the CIA and the FBI and the leading of witnesses by the police.

In 1996, he founded the Kalamazoo South African Foundation. Dutch sports journalist Tom Egbers wrote a novel based on Mokone, which was made into a movie in 2000; both novel and movie are called The Black Meteor (De Zwarte Meteoor).

Mokone died in Washington on 19 March 2015, aged 82.
