= Jacky (film) =

2015 film

- Theatrical release poster
- Directed by: Fow Pyng Hu; Brat Ljatifi
- Written by: Fow Pyng Hu; Brat Ljatifi
- Produced by: Jeroen Beker; Frans van Gestel
- Starring: Fow Pyng Hu
- Cinematography: Benito Strangio
- Production companies: Motel Films; VPRO
- Distributed by: A-Film Distribution
- Release dates: 2000 (Cannes); 11 May 2000 (Netherlands)
- Running time: 128 minutes
- Country: Netherlands
- Languages: English, Japanese

Jacky is a 2000 drama film directed by Fow Pyng Hu and Brat Ljatifi. It was screened in the Un Certain Regard section at the 2000 Cannes Film Festival.

== Cast ==
- Fow Pyng Hu - Jacky
- Eveline Wu - Chi Chi
- Gary Guo - Gary
- Xuan Wei Zhou - Mother
- Jiah Bao Toh - Pau Pau
- Ka Way Chui - Tourist girl
- Chee Ngai Ng - Tourist boy
- Ad van Kempen - Real estate agent
