= Black Swans (film) =

- Official poster
- Directed by: Colette Bothof
- Written by: Arend Steenbergen
- Produced by: Ralf Koot
- Starring: Carice van Houten; Dragan Bakema; Mohammed Chaara
- Cinematography: Richard Van Oosterhout
- Edited by: Sander Vos
- Music by: Han Otten
- Production company: M+B Film
- Distributed by: A-Film Distribution
- Release dates: January 2005 (IFFR); 14 July 2005 (Netherlands)
- Running time: 95 minutes
- Country: Netherlands
- Language: Dutch

Black Swans (Dutch: Zwarte zwanen) is a 2005 Dutch drama film directed by Colette Bothof and written by Arend Steenbergen and stars Carice van Houten, Dragan Bakema and Mohammed Chaara. The film won a Golden Calf for Best Sound at the Netherlands Film Festival in 2005. It also showed at the 2005 International Film Festival Rotterdam.

== Plot ==
Marleen works as a volunteer in a rest home in Spain. When she meets Vince they are attracted to each other. Their passionate relationship has its ups and downs, and eventually, Marleen ends up in a hospital. The film ends when Marleen walks into the sea.

== Cast ==
- Carice van Houten as Marleen
- Dragan Bakema as Vince
- Mohammed Chaara as Mo, a friend of Vince

== Production ==
The film is set and filmed at the Costa de Almería in Spain in 2003. Due to financial problems, the film was not released until 2005.
