= Vivian van Huiden =

Dutch voice actress

- Born: August 1, 1990 (age 35)
- Occupation: Voice actress

Vivian van Huiden (born August 1, 1990, Amstelveen) is a Dutch voice actress.

== Filmography ==
=== Voice acting roles ===
- Phineas and Ferb (TV series) - Isabella
- The Powerpuff Girls (TV series, 2016) - Princess Morbucks
- Angelo Rules (TV series) - Lola
- Lilo & Stitch - Lilo
- Wild Chicks - Sprotte
- Descendants - Princess Audrey
- Descendants 3 - Princess Audrey

=== Screen roles ===
- Snuf de hond (TV series) (2008) - Mirjam Weisman
- Penny's Shadow (2011) - Chantal
