= Frank Lammers =

Dutch actor (born 1972)

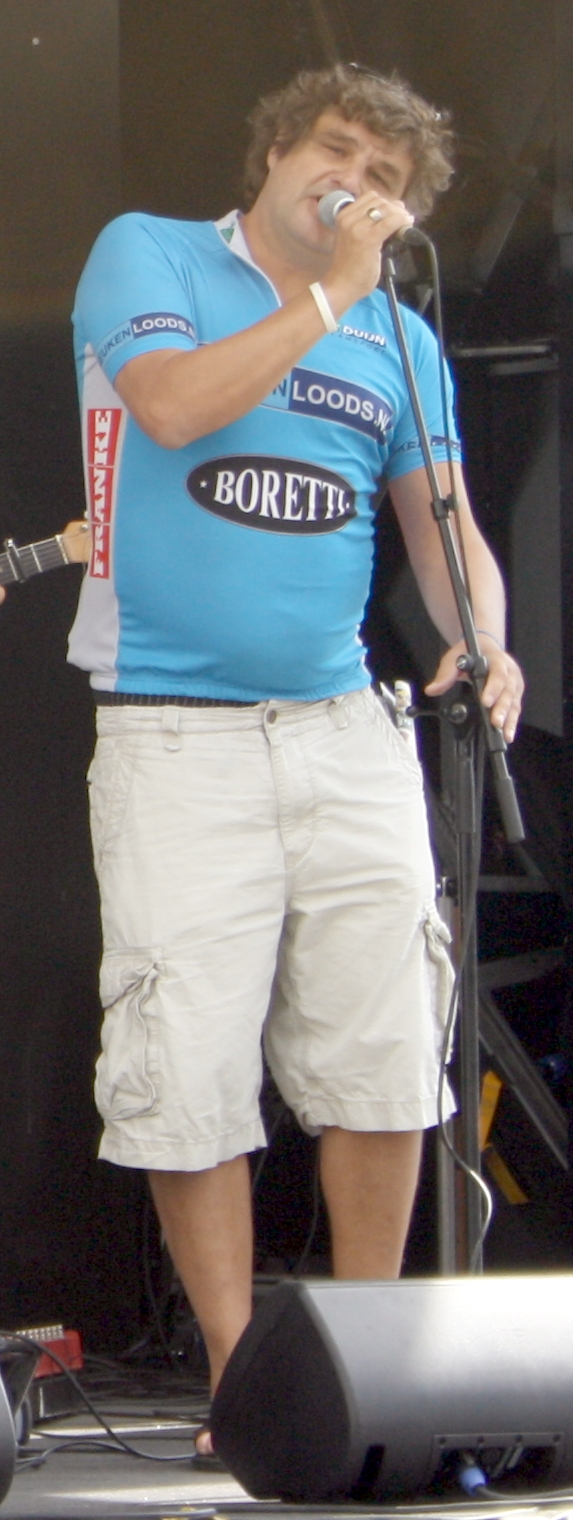
- Lammers in 2013
- Born: 10 April 1972 (age 54); Mierlo, Netherlands
- Occupation: Actor
- Years active: 1998–present

Frank Lammers (born 10 April 1972) is a Dutch television and film actor. In 2006, he won a "Best Actor" Golden Calf for his work in Nachtrit. In 2009, he won the Dutch National News Quiz. Notable for his roles in films like Michiel de Ruyter and the Netflix series Undercover as the charismatic drug lord Ferry Bouman, Lammers has received acclaim for his contributions to Dutch cinema. Beyond acting, he directed the award-winning film Of ik gek ben in 2017. He is married to writer Eva Posthuma de Boer, with whom he has a daughter and a son.

== Filmography ==
=== Film ===
Year	Title	Role	Notes
1998	FL 19,99	Dakloze	
2000	Wild Mussels	Daan	
2000	The Black Meteor	Wezelkop	
2001	De grot	René	
2003	Grimm	Farmer	
2003	Polleke	Meester Wouter	
2003	Father's Affair	Dees	
2004	Het zuiden	Loe de Koning	
2004	Shouf Shouf Habibi!	Chris	
2004	De Dominee	Adri	
2005	Flirt	Egbert-Jan	
2005	Schnitzel Paradise	Flirt	Egbert-Jan
2005	Life!	BMW-er	
2006	Het Woeden der Gehele Wereld	Inspecteur Douvetrap	
2006	Black Book	Kees	
2006	Nachtrit	Dennis	
2007	Nadine	Vince	
2009	Luke and Lucy: The Texas Rangers	Lambik	Dutch version, Voice
2010	Lex	Lex	
2010	New Kids Turbo	Foreman	
2011	Bullhead	Sam Raymond	
2011	De president	Krasimir	
2011	The Gang of Oss	Harry den Brock	
2012	De Marathon	Kees	
2014	Onder het hart	Rogier	
2015	Michiel de Ruyter	Michiel de Ruyter	
2015	J. Kessels	Kessels	
2015	The Prosecutor the Defender the Father and His Son	Dutch ex-peacekeeper	
2016	Sneekweek	Rechercheur van Velzen	
2016	Deadweight	Eric van de Geijn	
2016	The Fury	Nico / Tiny's family friend	
2017	Hotel de grote L	Vader	
2018	D-Railed	The Host	
2018	All You Need Is Love	Ernst	
2019	Grimm re-edit	Farmer	
2019	April, May en June	Visser	
2020	Groeten van Gerri	Gerri van Vlokhoven	
2021	Ferry	Ferry Bouman	
2021	Herrie in Huize Gerri	Gerri van Vlokhoven	
2020-2021	Edelfigurant (TV Series)	Rikkert	
2021	Herrie in Huize Gerri	Gerri van Vlokhoven	
2023	All Inclusive		
2024	Ferry 2		

=== Television ===
Year	Title	Role	Notes
2002	The Enclave	Darko Bokan	TV movie
2019	Undercover	Ferry Bouman	Series
2023	Ferry	Ferry Bouman	Series
