= AmnesiA =

2001 film by Martin Koolhoven

- Theatrical release poster
- Directed by: Martin Koolhoven
- Written by: Martin Koolhoven
- Produced by: Frans van Gestel; Jeroen Beker
- Starring: Fedja van Huêt; Carice van Houten
- Cinematography: Menno Westendorp
- Edited by: Job ter Burg
- Music by: Fons Merkies
- Production companies: Motel Films; VPRO
- Distributed by: A-Film Distribution
- Release date: 3 May 2001
- Running time: 90 minutes
- Country: Netherlands
- Language: Dutch

AmnesiA is a 2001 Dutch drama film directed by Martin Koolhoven.

== Plot ==
Alex is a young photographer who is struggling with himself. Every time he tries to take a photo, he sees a young woman through his lens. One day, he receives a call from his twin brother Aram, who asks him to come home. Their mother has been ill for some time, and her condition seems to be getting worse. Alex dreads facing his domineering brother and having to dredge up past issues. On his way home, Alex finds Sandra, a mysterious arsonist, in his car. He decides to take her with him to his parents’ house.

== Cast ==
- Fedja van Huêt - Alex / Aram
- Carice van Houten - Sandra
- Theo Maassen - Wouter
- Erik van der Horst - Young Alex / Aram
- Sacha Bulthuis - Mother of Alex and Aram
- Cas Enklaar - Eugene
- Eva Van Der Gucht - Esther
- Bert Luppes - The Doctor
- Carly Wijs - Woman in flashback
