= Don (2006 Dutch film) =

2006 Dutch film by Arend Steenbergen

- Theatrical release poster
- Directed by: Arend Steenbergen
- Written by: Arend Steenbergen
- Produced by: Bert Nijdam
- Starring: Clemens Levert; Caroline De Bruijn; Reinout Bussemaker
- Cinematography: Lennert Hillege
- Edited by: Jef Hertoghs
- Music by: Beatkidz; Paleis van Boem
- Production company: Lemming Film
- Distributed by: A-Film Distribution
- Release date: 27 April 2006
- Running time: 90 minutes
- Country: Netherlands
- Language: Dutch

Don (also known as Off-Side) is a Dutch 2006 film, directed by Arend Steenbergen.

== Plot ==
The film is about bullying (with death threats and assaults causing injuries), friendship, and soccer. Don (Clemens Levert), a 12-year-old boy, is the main character. Don's best friend at his new school is Milos (Marius Gottlieb). Milos boasts about his big brother who supposedly protects him and is a sportsman. However, this brother is already missing several years after the war in former Yugoslavia, and he is probably dead. Don confronts him with his lies and false hope. Initially this shocks Milos.

Henri (Samir Veen) is the worst bully.

Don gains respect by being good at football. He organizes a football team. Several former bullies become friends. Don even invites his worst enemy, Henri, to join, because he plays well. On and off Henri is in the team; when he is, he is team leader, when not, Don is. Milos is so afraid of the ball that he seems to be of no use for the team. However, he can run fast, and is assigned the task to stay near one strong opponent, making him ineffective.

Don gets little support from his parents: when he comes home beaten up, he is blamed for fighting. When this happens a second time, they are about to send him to a boarding school in England. However, the whole class except Henri comes, led by Milos, to the house, and asks the parents to allow Don to stay. After Don says also that he wants to stay, the parents give in.

At the final of the competition they win by unfair tactics such as kicking their opponents.

Henri refuses to shake hands with Don. However, he does one positive thing: he makes good for destroying Milos' football by asking the judge to give them the ball, and, after he gets it, giving it to Milos.

== Cast ==
- Clemens Levert ...Don
- Samir Veen ...Henry
- Juliann Ubbergen ...Hossan - is also in Afblijven
- Jorik Prins ...Han
- Illias Addab ...Hiram
- Marius Gottlieb ...Milos
- Caroline De Bruijn ...Don's mother
- Reinout Bussemaker ...Don's father
- Sander Foppele ...Gymteacher
- Jeroen Spitzenberger ...Referee final
- Rene van 't Hof ...Milos' father
- Raymi Sambo ...Referee
- Floris Heyne ...'Kakker'
- Lodewijk de Stoppelaar ...'Kakker'
