= Wild Mussels =

2000 film

- Theatrical release poster
- Directed by: Erik de Bruyn
- Written by: Erik de Bruyn
- Produced by: Erik Schut; Peter van Vogelpoel
- Starring: Fedja van Huêt; Will van Kralingen
- Cinematography: Joost van Gelder
- Edited by: J.P. Luijsterburg
- Music by: David van der Heyden
- Production companies: Argus Film Produktie; NPS
- Distributed by: Upstream Pictures
- Release date: 28 September 2000
- Running time: 115 minutes
- Country: Netherlands
- Language: Dutch
- Budget: ƒ2,5 million

Wild Mussels (Dutch: Wilde Mossels) is a 2000 Dutch drama film written and directed by Erik de Bruyn.

== Cast ==
- Fedja van Huêt as Leen
- Frank Lammers as Daan
- Frederik Brom as Jacob (as Freek Brom)
- Will van Kralingen as Noortje
- Josse De Pauw as Wannes
- Angelique de Bruijne as Janine
- Melek Karasu as Atash
- Martin Dunne as Nowhere Man
- Hans Veerman as Rinus
- Freark Smink as Bert
- Marina de Graaf as Diana
