= Theo Maassen =

Dutch comedian and actor (born 1966)

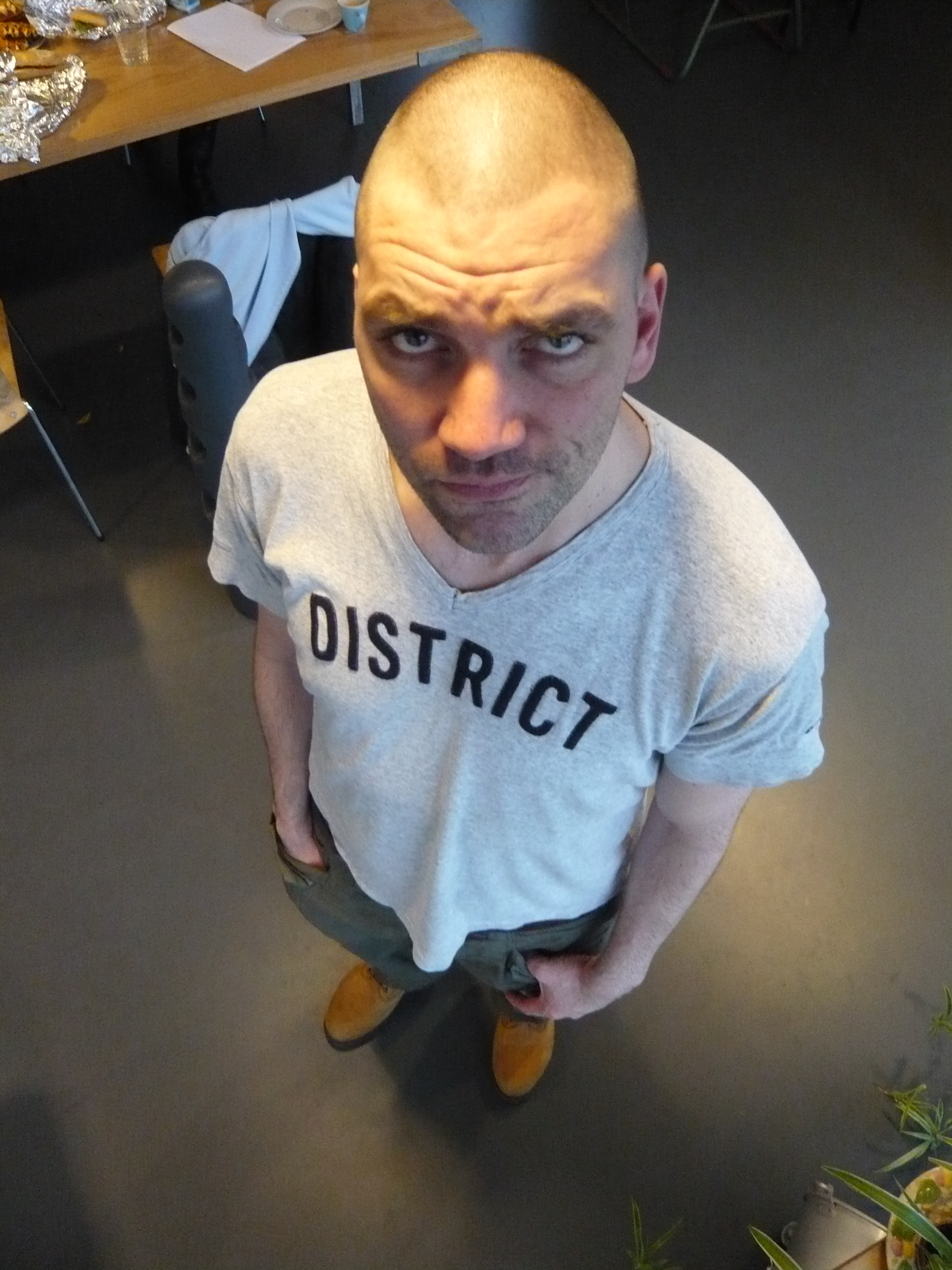
- Theo Maassen in 2007
- Born: 8 December 1966 (age 59); Oegstgeest, South Holland
- Occupations: Comedian, actor

Theodorus Wilhelmus (Theo) Maassen (born 8 December 1966 in Oegstgeest, South Holland) is a Dutch comedian and actor who grew up in the village of Zijtaart (municipality of Veghel) in the Dutch province of North Brabant. He currently lives in Eindhoven. In addition to his shows, he has also made a number of appearances in films.

== Career ==
Maassen won two of the biggest comedy contests in the Netherlands in 1990, the Groninger Studenten Cabaret Festival (GSCF), and Cameretten. The GSCF jury was not pleased with the quality of the contestants that year, and gave Maassen the first prize, remarking he was the best of the year, but still not very good.

Since 1995, Maassens shows are shown on Dutch national television, making him more and more a household name.

In 2006, Maassen received the 'Prins Bernhard Cultuurfonds Theater Prijs 2006' (Prince Bernhard Culture Fund Theatre Prize 2006) for his 'daring combination of theatre and comedy'. The same year he also received the Prijs van de Kritiek (Prize of the critics), a yearly prize by Dutch theatre critics.

He also has released a song titled Lauwe Pis (Lukewarm Piss) which peaked at #1 on the Dutch Top 40.

== Shows ==
- 1994: Bepaalde dingen (Certain Things)
- 1996: Neuk het systeem (Fuck the System)
- 1998: Ruwe pit (Raw Seed)
- 2002: Functioneel naakt (Functionally Nude)
- 2006: Tegen beter weten in (Against All Odds)
- 2009: Zonder pardon (Without Mercy)
- 2011: Met alle respect (With All Due Respect)
- 2013: Einde oefening (End of Exercise)
- 2016: Vankwaadtoterger (From Bad to Worse)
- 2018: Situatie gewijzigd (Altered Situation)
- 2022: Onbekend terrein (Unknown Territory)
- 2024: Onbegonnen werk (Hopeless Task / Lost Cause)

== Films ==
Maassen has appeared in the following Dutch movies:

- 2001: AmnesiA as Wouter
- 2001: Adriaans plaag (short film) as trader Benedikt
- 2001: Miss Minoes (Minoes) as Tibbe
- 2003: www.eenzaam.nl as Marcel
- 2003: Interview as Theo
- 2003: Young Kees (Dutch: Kees de jongen) as Vader Bakels
- 2003: De onterechte kampioen as himself (he also directed and produced this movie)
- 2004: Amazones as Achilles
- 2006: Black Book (directed by Paul Verhoeven)
- 2008: TBS as main character Johan
- 2008: Dunya and Desi as Jeff
- 2009: Zonder Pardon ("Without Pardon"), registration of the show (see above)
- 2010: New Kids Turbo as a drunk in the bar
- 2011: The Gang of Oss as Van Schijndel
- 2012: Manslaughter (Dutch: Doodslag) as Max
- 2012: Fresku 2.0 as himself

== Television ==
Maassen plays the role of 'Roel' in the television series 'Mevrouw de minister'. He also had a supporting role in the show Dunya en Desie.

== Personal life ==
Maassen once stole the UEFA cup from the stadium of football club PSV Eindhoven. For several years it was unknown who had been responsible for the disappearance of the trophy. The true story was confessed by Maassen himself, live on a TV talkshow about football. That night the show had several guests that were in the possession of rare football artifacts. When the host asked Maassen about his artifact, he took the UEFA cup out of his bag and put it on the table, in front of the baffled host and guests. He received a few hours of community service after being brought up on charges by the club. Later, he also showed on Studio Voetbal that he had stolen PSV's second prize of the UEFA Supercup.

In 2008 Maassen started the organization Comedians for Congo to raise money for children fleeing the war torn country.

== See also ==
- Culture of the Netherlands
