= Soof 3 =

2022 Dutch film directed by Anne de Clercq

- Film poster
- Directed by: Anne de Clercq
- Distributed by: Dutch FilmWorks
- Release date: 15 September 2022
- Country: Netherlands
- Language: Dutch

Soof 3 is a 2022 Dutch romantic comedy film directed by Anne de Clercq. On the day of the film's release, it won the Golden Film award after having sold 100,000 tickets. The film also won the Platinum Film award after having sold 400,000 tickets. The film is the sequel to the 2016 film Soof 2.

It was the most popular Dutch film of 2022 at the box office with just over 497,000 viewers. The film finished in 13th place in the list of best visited films in the Netherlands in 2022. Lies Visschedijk and Fedja van Huêt play lead roles in the film. The film is the third film in a trilogy.

== See also ==
- Soof (2013 film)
