= Dries Roelvink =

Dutch singer of the Levenslied genre (born 1959)

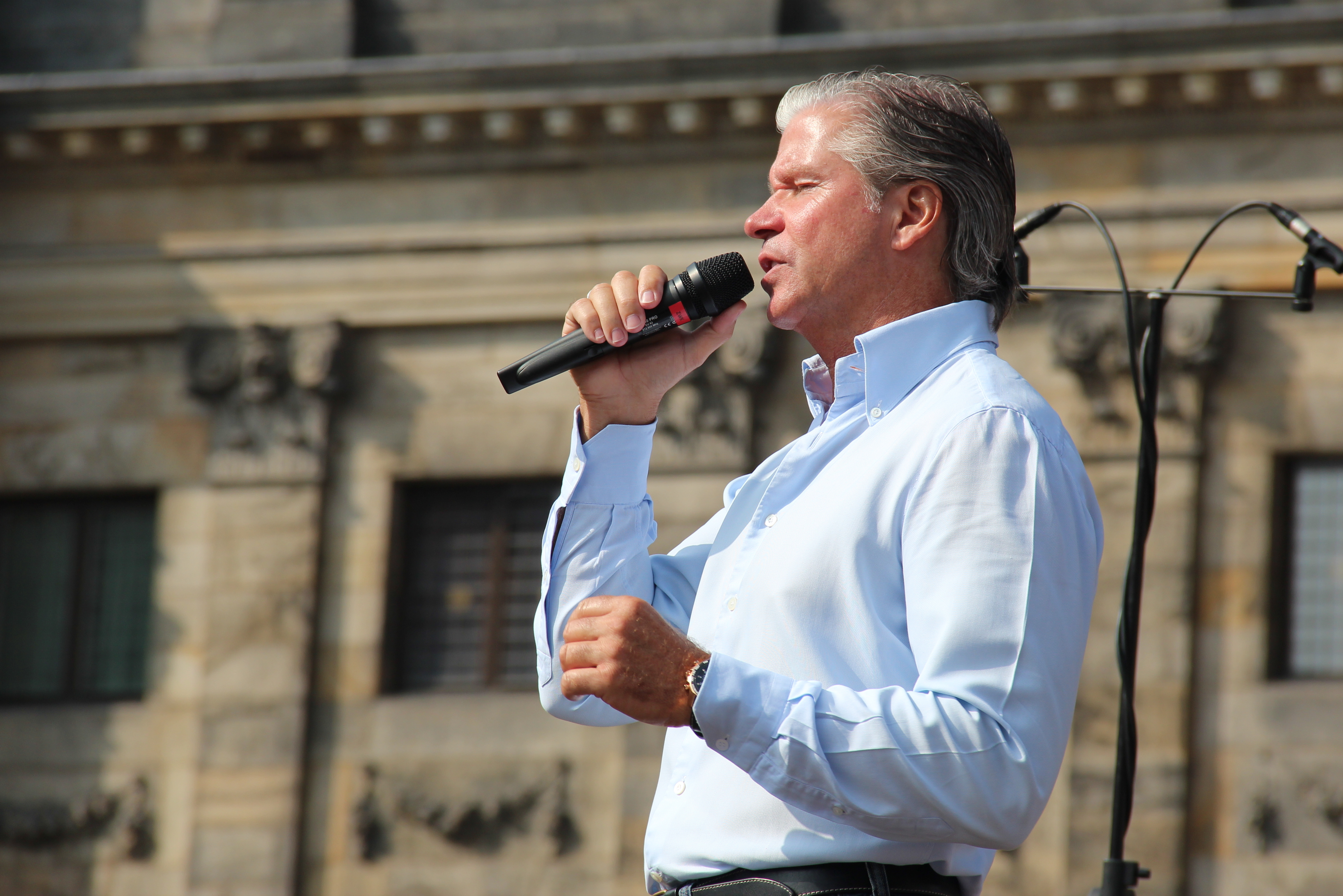
- Dries Roelvink at the Draaiorgel Festival Amsterdam 2012
- Born: Andries Roelvink; 1 January 1959 (age 67); Amsterdam
- Website: https://driesroelvink.nl/

Dries Roelvink (born 1 January 1959 in Amsterdam) is a Dutch singer of the Levenslied genre. He was born in the Jordaan and was raised in the folkish tradition of the Jordaanlied (English: Jordaan song).

In 2007, he tried to perform at the Rotterdam Ahoy music venue but sold too few tickets.

He starred in the 2008 film I Love Dries by the Dutch film director Tom Six.

He has amassed a TikTok following from clips of Roelvink being served wine in fancy setting. The videos are played over Me Olvide De Vivir.
