= The Idol (2015 film) =

2015 film

- Theatrical release poster
- Directed by: Hany Abu-Assad
- Written by: Hany Abu-Assad; Sameh Zoabi
- Starring: Tawfeek Barhom
- Production companies: KeyFilm; September Film Productions; Idol Film Production
- Release date: 11 September 2015 (TIFF)
- Running time: 100 minutes
- Country: Palestine
- Language: Palestinian Arabic

The Idol (Arabic: يا طير الطاير, romanized: yā ṭayr aṭ-ṭāʾir, lit. 'O birds in flight!') is a 2015 Palestinian drama film directed by Hany Abu-Assad. It was shown in the Special Presentations section of the 2015 Toronto International Film Festival. It was selected as the Palestinian entry for the Best Foreign Language Film at the 89th Academy Awards but it was not nominated.

== Plot ==
The Idol tells the story of the life of Mohammed Assaf, wedding singer from a refugee camp in Gaza who went to win 2013's Arab Idol singing competition.

The film starts out in 2005 in Gaza. Mohammed is a young child, playing in a band together with his tomboy sister Nour and two friends. Recognizing the possibilities Mohammed's incredible voice has to offer, they set out to become a real band and are soon asked to play at weddings. Nour, however, collapses during a performance and is found to have kidney failure, requiring her to undergo weekly dialysis or for her family to buy her a kidney transplant. As the transplant is far too expensive, Mohammed makes it his goal to raise enough money as a singer to purchase it. He takes singing lessons and befriends a girl named Amal, also suffering from kidney disease, during Nour's dialysis sessions. In spite of treatment, Nour dies, and Mohammed is left disillusioned and depressed.

Seven years later, in 2012, Mohammed performs with a band for the show Palestinian Idol, but the travel restrictions on Gaza prevent him from actually going to the studio in Ramallah and force him to perform over Skype. The poor conditions of Gaza electricity affect the performance, frustrating Mohammed, who wants to quit singing until he meets Amal again. She inspires him, and with the support of his family, Mohammed decides to audition for Arab Idol. Crossing the border from Gaza into Egypt, where the auditions will take place, is near impossible, and Mohammed gets caught with a fake passport at the Rafah Border Crossing, but after performing a religious song for the border clerk, he is admitted through, with a warning that it may be difficult for him to ever return. In Cairo, Mohammed finds the auditions already underway and all the slots taken, forcing him to break into the building where a young singer offers Mohammed his slot after hearing him sing on the toilet. Mohammed successfully auditions for the show and is soon allowed a pass to Beirut to take part in the main competition.

As the show progresses, Mohammed's reputation grows among the Palestinians, who are shown to be ecstatic that a Palestinian man is performing so well and winning such acclaim, emboldening the Palestinian national pride and inspiring hope and optimism. The pressure of this gets to Mohammed, who has a panic attack right before an important rehearsal. With the support of one of the audition judges and Amal (over the phone), Mohammed picks himself up and gets back to performing. The film ends by switching to real-life footage of Mohammed Assaf winning the Arab Idol title, followed by a brief overview of Assaf's life after the finale.

== Cast ==
- Tawfeek Barhom
- Kais Attalah
- Hiba Attalah
- Ahmad Qasem
- Abdel Kareem Barakeh
- Nadine Labaki
- Ashraf Barhom
- Saber Shreim
- Burhan Koja Oghlan

== Production ==
The Idol was partially filmed on location in Gaza, the first feature film to be shot there in decades, along with Jenin, Amman, Beirut and Cairo. The Idol was produced in association with the Doha Film Institute and the support of the Netherlands Film Fund.

== Distribution ==
Adopt Films acquired all U.S. rights to The Idol.

== See also ==
- List of submissions to the 89th Academy Awards for Best Foreign Language Film
- List of Palestinian submissions for the Academy Award for Best Foreign Language Film
