= The Black Meteor =

2000 film

De Zwarte Meteoor
- Theatrical release poster
- Directed by: Guido Pieters
- Written by: Tom Egbers (novel), Kees van Beijnum (screenplay)
- Produced by: Matthijs van Heijningen
- Cinematography: Wouter Suijderhout
- Edited by: Tatjana Schops
- Distributed by: RCV Film Distribution
- Release date: 11 December 2000
- Running time: 107 minutes
- Country: Netherlands
- Languages: Dutch; English; Afrikaans
- Budget: €2 million

The Black Meteor (Dutch: De zwarte meteoor) is a 2000 Dutch film directed by Guido Pieters. The film is based on the novel by Tom Egbers, a Dutch sports journalist, which was adapted for the screen by Kees van Beijnum. The novel fictionalizes the story of Steve Mokone, the first black player in Dutch professional football.

== Plot ==
The film is set in the late 1950s, when football club SC Heracles, from Almelo in the rural east of the Netherlands, acquires an African player named Steve Mokone. After he joins Heracles, the team's fortunes improve, while he also changes every aspect of life in the small city. Mokone builds a unique friendship with the 15-year-old Felix, but then leaves town almost as quickly as he came.

== Cast ==
- Jet Novuka as Steve Mokone
- Erik van der Horst as Felix Verbeek
- Gijs Scholten van Aschat as Schouten, Heracles chairman
- Peter Tuinman as Felix's father
- Lieneke le Roux as Felix's mother
- Thekla Reuten as Vera
- Roef Ragas as Jaap Stegehuis
- Caro Lenssen as Mies
- Angelique de Bruijne as neighbor
- Aus Greidanus as Heracles coach
- Wouter van Oord as Tim
- Guus de Wit as Jan
- Benten Wijnen as Jan
- Jop Kappelhoff as Koen
- Frederik Brom as Rooie Gaait

== Reception ==
Scott Foundas, writing for Variety, was not overly positive, criticizing its "holier-than-thou coming of age/race relations" quality.
