= Fedja van Huêt =

Dutch actor (born 1973)

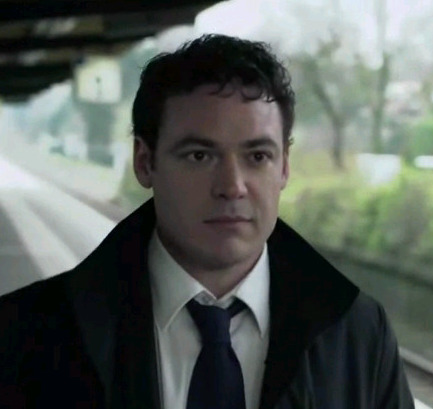
- Fedja van Huêt in the series Overspel, 2014.
- Born: 21 June 1973 (age 53); The Hague, Netherlands
- Occupation: Actor
- Years active: 1987 – present

Fedja van Huêt (born 21 June 1973) is a Dutch stage and film actor, best known for the 2022 horror film Speak No Evil and for the Oscar winning film Character (film).

Van Huêt was born in The Hague and received his professional training at the Maastricht Academy of Dramatic Arts. He was in the ensemble of the theater companies RO Theater and Theatercompagnie/Hollandia. At present, Van Huêt is connected to Toneelgroep Amsterdam.

In 2001, he received the Gouden Kalf award, the most prestigious film prize in the Netherlands, for best actor in the film AmnesiA.

Van Huêt has been in relationships with actresses Katja Schuurman and Halina Reijn. He is married to actress Karina Smulders.

== Selected filmography ==
- Return to Oegstgeest (1987) as Little Peter
- Character (1997) as Jacob Willem Katadreuffe
- The Delivery (1999) as Alfred
- Wilde Mossels (2000) as Leen
- AmnesiA (2001)
- Peter Bell II: The Hunt for the Czar Crown (2003) as Fluik
- The Preacher (2004) as Crime Lawyer
- Waiter (2006) as Ralph
- Loft (2010) as Bart
- The Zigzag Kid (2012) as Jacob
- Daylight (2013)
- Soof (2013)
- Accused (2014)
- Gift from the Heart (2014)
- Bloed, zweet & tranen (2015) as Tim Griek
- The Little Gangster (2015)
- J. Kessels (2015)
- De Held (2016)
- Amsterdam Vice (2019)
- Grenslanders(2019)
- Soof 3 (2022)
- Speak No Evil (2022)
- Maxton Hall — The World Between Us (2024) as Mortimer Beaufort
- Fabula (2025) Opening film of the IFFR.
- Our Girls (2025)

== TV (films and series) ==
Supporting roles in Baantjer, Oppassen!!! and Goede tijden, slechte tijden, leading role in "Overspel" ("Adulterer")
