= List of films that received the Golden Film =

This page is a list of films that received the Golden Film since its introduction in 2001 by the Netherlands Film Festival and the Netherlands Film Fund. In 2001 and 2002, films from the Netherlands received the award once they had sold 75,000 tickets. From 2003 to date, the Golden Film is awarded to films from the Netherlands once they have sold 100,000 tickets. This page shows, for both audience criteria, which films received the Golden Film and how soon they received it after their releases.

In the following tables, the 'year' column contains the years in which the films received the Golden Film, the '#' column contains the number of the Golden Film, the 'film title' column contains the titles of the receiving films, the 'film release' column contains the dates on which the films were first released in the cinemas, and the 'Golden Film' column contains the days when the Netherlands Film Festival and the Netherlands Film Fund announced that the receiving films reached the audience criterion of the Golden Film.

When a film also received other box office awards, the award for the highest number of sold tickets is listed in the 'other' column. The Platinum Film was awarded for 200,000 sold tickets in 2001 and 2002, and is awarded for 400,000 sold tickets since 2003. The Diamond Film is awarded for 1,000,000 sold tickets since 2007. These awards can be awarded in the same year as the Golden Film or in a later year.

== 2001–2002 ==
Golden Film for 75,000 tickets sold
Year	#	Film title	Film release	Golden Film	Other
2001	1	I Love You Too	15 February 2001	28 September 2001	
2001	2	The Moving True Story of a Woman Ahead of Her Time	6 September 2001	11 October 2001	Platinum
2001	3	The Discovery of Heaven	18 October 2001	7 November 2001	Platinum
2001	4	Miss Minoes	6 December 2001	27 December 2001	Platinum
2002	5	Oysters at Nam Kee's	5 September 2002	30 September 2002	
2002	6	Yes Nurse! No Nurse!	3 October 2002	15 October 2002	Platinum
2002	7	Full Moon Party	10 October 2002	15 October 2002	Platinum
2002	8	Loonies	10 October 2002	30 October 2002	
2002	9	Peter Bell	17 November 2002	27 November 2002	Platinum
2002	10	Twin Sisters	12 December 2002	30 December 2002	Platinum

== 2003–present ==
Golden Film for 100,000 tickets sold
Year	#	Film title	Film release	Golden Film	Other
2003	11	Love to Love	13 March 2003	31 March 2003	
2003	12	Godforsaken	24 April 2003	12 May 2003	
2003	13	De Schippers van de Kameleon	25 June 2003	2 July 2003	Platinum
2003	14	Phileine Says Sorry	9 October 2003	19 October 2003	
2003	15	Pipo en de p-p-Parelridder	20 November 2003	23 December 2003	
2003	16	Peter Bell II: The Hunt for the Czar Crown	18 December 2003	29 December 2003	Platinum
2004	17	Cloaca	23 October 2003	9 January 2004	
2004	18	Hush Hush Baby	29 January 2004	8 February 2004	
2004	19	Father's Affair	11 December 2003	24 March 2004	
2004	20	Polleke	11 October 2003	24 March 2004	
2004	21	In Orange	28 April 2004	19 May 2004	
2004	22	The Preacher	2 September 2004	11 October 2004	
2004	23	Alice in Glamourland	30 September 2004	11 October 2004	
2004	24	Simon	30 September 2004	24 November 2004	
2004	25	Tow Truck Pluck	18 November 2004	3 December 2004	Platinum
2005	26	Floris	16 December 2004	7 January 2005	
2005	27	Erik of het klein insectenboek	9 December 2004	26 January 2005	
2005	28	Too Fat Too Furious	3 February 2005	16 February 2005	
2005	29	Lepel	3 February 2005	22 February 2005	
2005	30	Kameleon 2	30 June 2005	8 July 2005	
2005	31	Zoop in Africa	14 July 2005	25 July 2005	
2005	32	Schnitzel Paradise	8 September 2005	19 September 2005	
2005	33	Winky's Horse	13 October 2005	26 October 2005	
2006	34	Gruesome School Trip	8 December 2005	2 January 2006	
2006	35	Zoop in India	29 June 2006	26 July 2006	
2006	36	Black Book	14 September 2006	18 September 2006	Diamond
2006	37	Keep Off	5 October 2006	18 October 2006	
2006	38	Crusade in Jeans	16 November 2006	27 November 2006	Platinum
2007	39	'n Beetje verliefd	14 December 2006	15 January 2007	
2007	40	Waiter	28 September 2006	26 January 2007	
2007	41	Ernst, Bobbie, en de geslepen Onix	14 February 2007	27 February 2007	
2007	42	Zoop in South America	18 July 2007	30 July 2007	
2007	43	Alles is Liefde	11 October 2007	15 October 2007	Diamond
2007	44	Timboektoe	4 October 2007	21 October 2007	
2007	45	Where Is Winky's Horse?	10 October 2007	29 October 2007	
2007	46	De Scheepsjongens van Bontekoe	22 November 2007	27 December 2007	
2008	47	Moordwijven	20 December 2007	1 January 2008	Platinum
2008	48	K3 en de Kattenprins	19 December 2007	4 January 2008	
2008	49	Alibi	14 February 2008	28 February 2008	
2008	50	TBS	31 January 2008	11 March 2008	
2008	51	Summer Heat	20 March 2008	28 March 2008	
2008	52	Dunya & Desie	17 April 2008	5 May 2008	
2008	53	Hoe overleef ik mezelf?	25 June 2008	9 July 2008	
2008	54	De Brief voor de Koning	16 July 2008	30 July 2008	
2008	55	Anubis en het pad der 7 zonden	6 October 2008	14 October 2008	Platinum
2008	56	Radeloos	2 October 2008	17 October 2008	
2008	57	Sinterklaas en het Geheim van het Grote Boek	9 October 2008	25 October 2008	
2008	58	Bride Flight	16 October 2008	27 October 2008	
2008	59	Oorlogswinter	27 November 2008	8 December 2008	Platinum
2008	60	Wit Licht	11 December 2008	24 December 2008	
2009	61	Spion van Oranje	5 February 2009	18 February 2009	
2009	62	Frogs & Toads	28 February 2009	1 March 2009	
2009	63	The Storm	17 September 2009	24 September 2024	Platinum
2009	64	Lover or loser	23 September 2009	4 October 2009	
2009	65	SpangaS op Survival	30 September 2009	16 October 2009	
2009	66	Sinterklaas en de Verdwenen Pakjesboot	7 October 2009	29 October 2009	
2009	67	The Dark House	29 October 2009	9 November 2009	
2009	68	Stricken	26 November 2009	28 November 2009	Diamond
2009	69	Anubis en de wraak van Arghus	16 December 2009	24 December 2009	Platinum
2009	70	The Hell of '63	17 December 2009	28 December 2009	
2010	71	Iep!	17 February 2010	1 March 2010	
2010	72	Gangsterboys	18 February 2010	8 March 2010	
2010	73	The Happy Housewife	15 April 2010	22 April 2010	Platinum
2010	74	Tirza	30 September 2010	18 October 2010	
2010	75	Fuchsia the Mini-Witch	6 October 2010	26 October 2010	
2010	76	Briefgeheim	14 October 2010	3 November 2010	
2010	77	Sinterklaas en het Pakjes Mysterie	13 October 2010	24 October 2010	
2010	78	Sint	11 November 2010	15 November 2010	
2010	79	The Dinner Club	25 November 2010	5 December 2010	
2010	80	New Kids Turbo	9 December 2010	11 December 2010	Diamond Film
