= List of Dutch-language films =

This is a list of films in the Dutch language (Dutch titles in brackets).

- Alice in Glamourland (Ellis in Glamourland)
- All Things Pass (Voorbij, voorbij)
- The Alzheimer Case (De Zaak Alzheimer)
- Antonia's Line (Antonia)
- Black Book (Zwartboek)
- Business Is Business (Wat zien ik?)
- Character (Karakter)
- Cloaca
- De Brief voor Sinterklaas
- Don
- Father's Affair (De Passievrucht)
- Flodder
- Flodders in America (Flodder in Amerika!)
- Floris
- The Fourth Man (De Vierde Man)
- Full Moon Party (Volle maan)
- Godforsaken (Van God Los)
- Grimm
- Gruesome School Trip (De Griezelbus)
- Hostel
- Hush Hush Baby (Shouf Shouf Habibi!)
- I Love You Too (Ik ook van jou)
- Kameleon 2
- Kauwboy
- Keetje Tippel
- Keep Off (Afblijven)
- Kneeling on a Bed of Violets (Knielen op een bed violen)
- Loonies (Loenatik - De moevie)
- Lost Years (Verloren Jaren)
- Everything is love (Alles is Liefde)
- Love to Love (Liever verliefd)
- Moscow, Belgium (Aanrijding in Moscou)
- Peter Bell (Pietje Bell)
- Peter Bell II: The Hunt For The Czar Crown (Pietje Bell II: De jacht op de tsarenkroon)
- Phileine Says Sorry (Phileine zegt sorry)
- Polleke
- Redbad
- TBS
- The Preacher (De Dominee)
- De Schippers van de Kameleon
- Schnitzel Paradise (Het Schnitzelparadijs)
- Soldier of Orange (Soldaat van Oranje)
- Someone Else's Happiness (Iemand anders zijn geluk)
- Spetters
- Tow Truck Pluck (Pluk van de Petteflet)
- Turkish Delight (Turks fruit)
- Undercover Kitty (Minoes)
- The Vanishing (Spoorloos)
- Waiter (Ober)
- Winter in Wartime (Oorlogswinter)
- Zoop in Africa (Zoop in Afrika)
- Zoop in India
