= List of Dutch films of 2005 =

This is a list of Dutch films released in 2005.

== January–March ==
Opening		Title	Distributor	Cast and crew	Ref.
J A N U A R Y	N/A				
F E B R U A R Y	2	Lepel	Warner Bros. Pictures	Willem van de Sande Bakhuyzen (director); Mieke de Jong (screenplay); Joep Truijen, Loes Luca, Carice van Houten, Barry Atsma, Kees Hulst	
F E B R U A R Y	3	Too Fat Too Furious (Vet hard)	A-Film Distribution	Tim Oliehoek (director); Jack Wouterse, Kürt Rogiers, Bracha van Doesburgh	
F E B R U A R Y	3	Off Screen	Independent Films	Pieter Kuijpers (director); Hugo Heinen (screenplay); Jan Decleir, Jeroen Krabbé,	
M A R C H	N/A				

== April–June ==
Opening		Title	Distributor	Cast and crew	Ref.
A P R I L	1	The Mystery of the Sardine (Het mysterie van de sardine)	Cinemien	Erik van Zuylen (director);	
M A Y	N/A				
J U N E	16	Kameleon 2	Independent Films	Steven de Jong (director);	

== July–September ==
Opening		Title	Distributor	Cast and crew	Ref.
J U L Y	14	Black Swans (Zwarte zwanen)	A-Film Distribution	Colette Bothof (director); Arend Steenbergen (screenplay); Mohammed Chaara, Carice van Houten, Dragan Bakema	
J U L Y	14	Zoop in Africa (Zoop in Afrika)	Independent Films	Johan Nijenhuis (director); Anya Koek (screenplay); Wijo Koek (screenplay); Juliette van Ardenne, Vivienne van den Assem, Nicolette van Dam, Ewout Genemans, Jon Karthaus, Sander-Jan Klerk	
A U G U S T	N/A				
S E P T E M B E R	8	Schnitzel Paradise (Het Schnitzelparadijs)	Independent Films	Martin Koolhoven (director); Marco van Geffen (screenplay); Marco van Geffen, Bracha van Doesburgh, Mimoun Oaïssa, Yahya Gaier, Tygo Gernandt	
S E P T E M B E R	29	Life!	A-Film Distribution	Willem van de Sande Bakhuyzen (director);	

== October–December ==
Opening		Title	Distributor	Cast and crew	Ref.
O C T O B E R	6	Johan	Buena Vista International	Nicole van Kilsdonk (director); Mieke de Jong (screenplay); Michiel Huisman, Johnny de Mol, Caro Lenssen, Huub Stapel, Ariane Schluter, Leona Philppo,	
O C T O B E R	12	Winky's Horse (Het Paard van Sinterklaas)	Warner Bros. Pictures	Mischa Kamp (director); Tamara Bos (screenplay); Ebbie Tam, Aaron Wan, Hanyi Han, Betty Schuurman, Jan Decleir, Mamoun Elyounoussi, Anneke Blok	
O C T O B E R	15	Bonkers (Knetter)	A-Film Distribution	Martin Koolhoven (director); Mieke de Jong (screenplay); Jesse Rinsma, Carice van Houten, Daan Schuurmans, Tom van Kessel, Leny Breederveld	
N O V E M B E R	10	Deep (Diep)	A-Film Distribution	Simone van Dusseldorp (director); Tamara Bos (screenplay); Melody Klaver, Monic Hendrickx, Bart Klever, Yorik Scholten, Stijn Koomen, Damien Hope	
D E C E M B E R	7	Gruesome School Trip (De Griezelbus)	Warner Bros. Pictures	Pieter Kuijpers (director/screenplay); Burny Bos (screenplay); Serge Price, Lisa Smit, Jim van der Panne, Willem Nijholt, Angela Schijf	

== See also ==
- Cinema of the Netherlands
