= Zoop (TV series) =

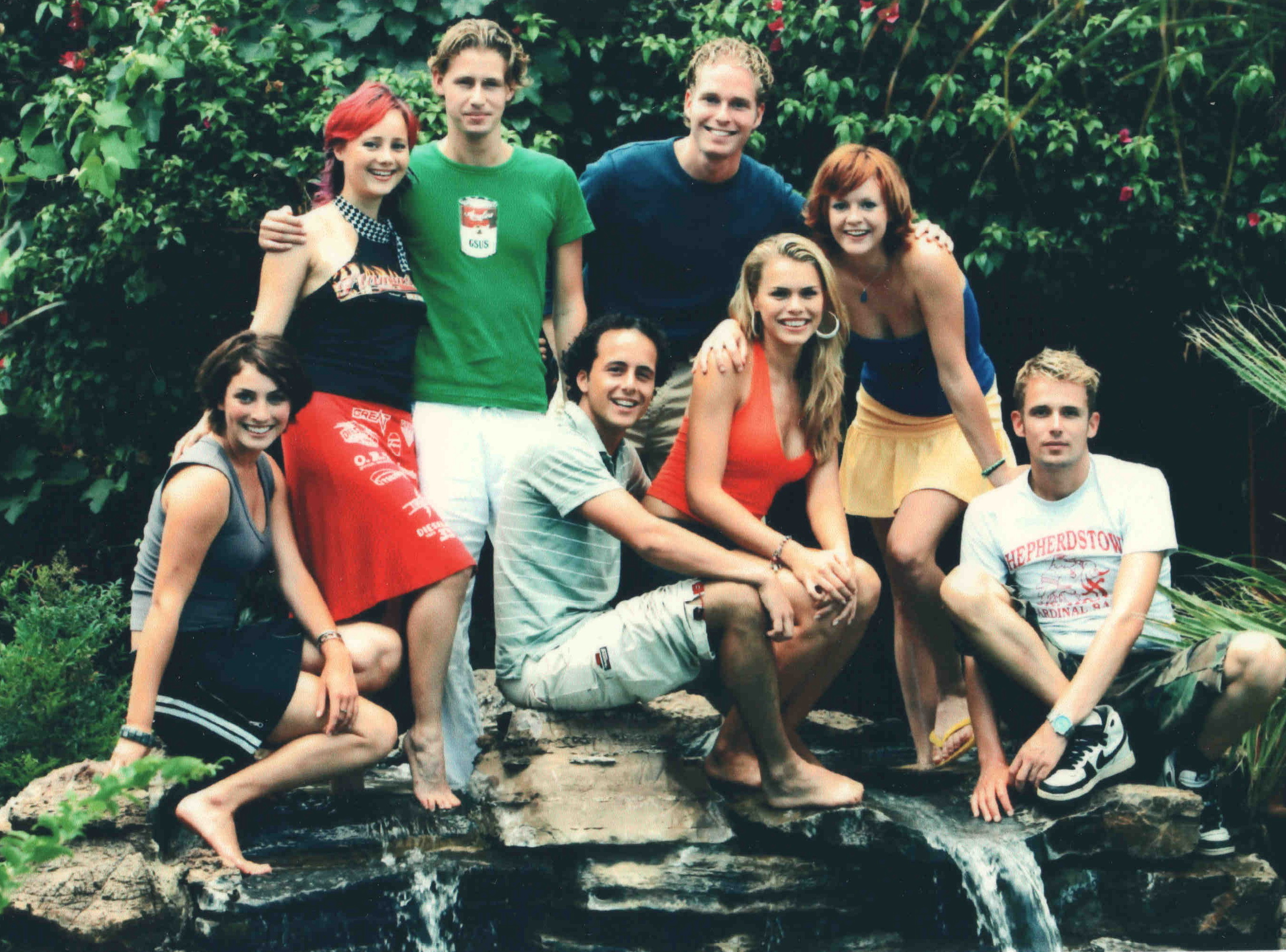
- Zoop Cast
- Genre: Family Comedy drama
- Created by: Marcel Boekhoorn
- Written by: Sander Donker; Johan Nijenhuis
- Directed by: Johan Nijenhuis; Jamel Aattache
- Starring: Juliette van Ardenne; Vivienne van den Assem; Nicolette van Dam; Jon Karthaus; Sander Jan Klerk
- Theme music composer: Martijn Schimmer
- Country of origin: Netherlands
- Original language: Dutch
- No. of seasons: 3

Production
- Producers: Alain De Levita; Johan Nijenhuis
- Production locations: Ouwehands Dierenpark, Rhenen, Gelderland, Netherlands
- Editor: Sandor Soeteman
- Running time: 10 minutes
- Production company: Nijenhuis & de Levita Film & TV B.V.

Original release
- Network: Nickelodeon Netherlands
- Release: 5 April 2004 – 2007

Zoop is a Dutch youth-oriented television series about eight young adults working in the Ouwehands Dierenpark zoo in Rhenen. The series was sold to Brazil, France, India and Sweden. The series has had three seasons since 2004, all on the Nickelodeon Netherlands channel. The series also spawned three spinoff films. Episodes continued to be broadcast up until 2014.

== Cast ==
Rangers
Actor	Character	Years	
Juliette van Ardenne	Sira Schilt	2004	2006
Viviënne van den Assem	Elise Pardoel	2004	2006
Erwan van Buuren	Alwin Bendorff	2004	2005
Nicolette van Dam	Bionda Kroonenberg	2004	2006
Ewout Genemans	Bastiaan van Diemen	2004	2006
Jon Karthaus	Moes Brinksma	2004	2006
Sander Jan Klerk	Aaron Zomerkamp	2005	2006
Patrick Martens	Mike Bosboom	2004	2006
Monique van der Werff	Taffie Arends	2004	2006

Mentors
Actor	Character	Years	
Sabine Koning	Gaby Meerman Berenger	2004	2006
Raymi Sambo	Bowey Berenger	2005	2006
Thomas Sykora	Fabian de Beurre	2004	2005

== Movies ==
The spinoff movies followed the characters to countries where they continued their education in zoology.

- Zoop in Africa (2005)
- Zoop in India (2006)
- Zoop in South America (2007)

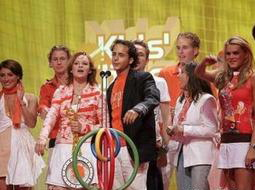
ZOOP cast at the Nickelodeon Kids' Choice Awards

== Awards ==
- "Gouden Stuiver" (Golden Nickel), an award for best Dutch youth program.
- "Nickelodeon Kid's Choice Award", an award for the best TV series.
- "Kinderkast Televisieprijs", an award for the best youth TV series.

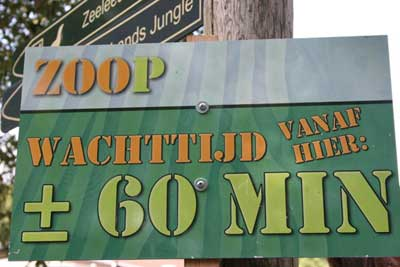
Sign at a Zoop meet & greet, indicating that at this point in the line, the wait is 60 minutes

== Fan days ==
Zoop "fan days" were organised, where cast members would sign autographs. An average of 11,000 people showed up at each event. After several public appearances almost got out of hand (because the actors were overwhelmed by hundreds of fans), Nijenshuis announced in 2006 that the security details provided to the actors would be enlarged.
