= Alibi (2008 film) =

2008 Dutch romantic comedy film

- Theatrical release poster
- Directed by: Johan Nijenhuis
- Screenplay by: Wijo Koek
- Produced by: Johan Nijenhuis; Alain de Levita
- Starring: Egbert-Jan Weeber; Georgina Verbaan; Achmed Akkabi
- Cinematography: Rolf Dekens
- Edited by: Michiel Reichwein
- Music by: Martijn Schimmer; Mario Zapata
- Production companies: Nijenhuis & de Levita Film & TV; NCRV
- Distributed by: Independent Films
- Release date: 9 February 2008
- Running time: 85 minutes
- Country: Netherlands
- Language: Dutch
- Box office: $2.8 million

Alibi is a 2008 Dutch romantic comedy film directed by Johan Nijenhuis, starring Egbert-Jan Weeber, Georgina Verbaan and Achmed Akkabi. The film received the Gouden Film.

== Plot ==
The plot is framed around the clever and quick-witted Youssef being interrogated at the police station. Most of the film consists of flashbacks that show what Youssef is telling the police.

Rick offers Youssef a job at his flourishing firm that deals in watertight alibis for anyone who needs an excuse to deceive suspicious wives, annoying mothers-in-law, or demanding bosses. Youssef, a natural liar, fits right in at the company but faces a dilemma when he falls in love with a waitress named Andrea.

Youssef tries to impress Andrea by calling her "the most beautiful sky" he has ever seen. This initially backfires, because Andrea has been cheated on many times herself and does not want to get involved with a man who has anything to hide, but she is nonetheless flattered. Rick convinces Youssef that every relationship benefits from a white lie sometimes, but Andrea believes that there is no place for deception in true love.

Rick asks Youssef to arrange an alibi for Rick himself, who wants to have an affair with a woman. To Youssef’s horror, the woman turns out to be Andrea. In retaliation, Youssef agrees to have sex with Rick’s wife, but then changes his mind. The whole thing comes to light, but ultimately Rick and his wife make up. With the help of a colleague who pretends to be Youssef’s brother, Youssef tries to make Andrea believe that she mistook this brother for Youssef. However, he calls the scheme off because that isn’t the truth either.

== Cast ==
- Achmed Akkabi as Youssef
- Georgina Verbaan as Andrea
- Egbert Jan Weeber as Sander
- Frederik Brom as Rick
- Hugo Maerten as Ko
- Isa Hoes as Tanja
- Kees Boot as Fred
- Sophia Wezer as Marga
- Daphne de Winkel as Shirley
- Cees Geel as baas van Andrea en Shirley
- Sanne Vogel as Marjam
- Ellen Pieters as Agente die Youssef ondervraagt
- Quintis Ristie as Agent op Politiebureau
- Amelie van de Klashorst as Prinses Amalia

== Release ==
=== Home media ===
The film was released on DVD and Blu-ray by Warner Home Video on 9 July 2008.
