= Love to Love You =

Love to Love You may refer to:

- "Love to Love You" (Cristy Lane song), 1981
- "Love to Love You" (The Corrs song), 1996
- "Love to Love You (And Tonight Pigs Will Fly)", a song by Caravan from In the Land of Grey and Pink

== See also ==
- Love to Love (disambiguation)
- Love to Love You Baby (disambiguation)
