= Snowfever =

2004 Dutch romantic comedy film

- Theatrical release poster
- Directed by: Pim van Hoeve
- Screenplay by: Pieter Bart Korthuis
- Produced by: Johan Nijenhuis; Alain de Levita
- Starring: Daan Schuurmans; Hanna Verboom; Egbert Jan Weeber
- Cinematography: Maarten van Keller
- Edited by: Job ter Burg
- Music by: Martijn Schimmer
- Production companies: Nijenhuis & de Levita Film & TV
- Distributed by: A-Film Distribution
- Release date: 14 October 2004
- Running time: 99 minutes
- Country: Netherlands
- Language: Dutch
- Box office: $769,521

Snowfever is a 2004 Dutch romantic comedy film directed by Pim van Hoeve and produced by Johan Nijenhuis and Alain de Levita. The film was released on 14 October 2004 where it received mixed reviews from critics.

== Cast ==
- Daan Schuurmans as Ryan
- Hanna Verboom as Nicky
- Egbert Jan Weeber as Erik
- Eva Van Der Gucht as Eef
- Peggy Vrijens as Max
- Collien Fernandes as Sam
  - Karina Smulders as Sam (voice)
- Hans van Beenen as Robin (Kiwi)
- Mark van Eeuwen as Dirk
- Jim Bakkum as Jack
- Yolanthe Sneijder-Cabau as Brenda (Banaantje)
