= Love to Love (film) =

2003 film

- Theatrical release poster
- Directed by: Pim van Hoeve
- Written by: Don Bohlinger; Pim van Hoeve
- Produced by: Alain De Levita; Johan Nijenhuis
- Starring: Miryanna van Reeden; Chris Zegers; Romijn Conen
- Cinematography: Han Wennink
- Edited by: Job ter Burg
- Music by: Martijn Schimmer
- Production companies: Nijenhuis & de Levita Film & TV; NCRV
- Distributed by: Independent Films (Theatrical); Universal Pictures; (Home media)
- Release date: 13 March 2003
- Running time: 87 minutes
- Country: Netherlands
- Language: Dutch
- Box office: $1,873,798

Love to Love (Dutch: Liever Verliefd) is a 2003 Dutch romantic comedy film written and directed by Pim van Hoeve and co-written by Don Bohlinger. It's loosely based on Noel Coward's play Design For Living.

The film was awarded a Golden Film (100,000 tickets sold) in 2003.

== Cast ==
- Miryanna van Reeden
- Chris Zegers
- Romijn Conen
