= Het Feest van Tante Rita =

2022 Dutch film directed by Dennis Bots

- Theatrical release poster
- Directed by: Dennis Bots
- Cinematography: Goof de Koning
- Edited by: Bas Wesseling
- Distributed by: WW Entertainment
- Release date: 21 December 2022 (Netherlands)
- Country: Netherlands
- Language: Dutch

Het Feest van Tante Rita (Dutch for: Aunt Rita's Party) is a 2022 Dutch children's film directed by Dennis Bots. The film won the Golden Film award after having sold 100,000 tickets.

Principal photography began in May 2022. Lucretia van der Vloot, Esther Mbire and Sil van der Zwan play roles in the film. Tooske Ragas, Jack van Gelder and Edsilia Rombley also play roles in the film. It is Rombley's first major film role.

The sequel Het Feest van Tante Rita 2: De Chocobom premiered in 2024.
