= Feuten: Het Feestje =

2011 Dutch drama film

- Theatrical release poster
- Directed by: Lourens Blok
- Screenplay by: Willem Bosch
- Based on: Feuten by: Willem Bosch; Michael Leendertse
- Produced by: Pieter Kuijpers; Sander van Meurs; Iris Otten
- Starring: Manuel Broekman; Evita Rozenberg; Tim Murck; Hanna Verboom
- Cinematography: Jacco van Ree
- Edited by: Léon Noordzij; Jef Hertoghs
- Music by: Jorrit Kleijnen; Alexander Reumers
- Production company: Pupkin Film
- Distributed by: Independent Films
- Release date: 17 October 2013 (Netherlands)
- Running time: 80 minutes
- Country: Netherlands
- Language: Dutch
- Box office: $1,134,795

Feuten: Het Feestje (English: Feuten: The Party) is a 2013 Dutch drama film directed by Lourens Blok and written by Willem Bosch. It serves as a stand-alone continuation of the BNN television drama series Feuten created by Willem Bosch and Michael Leendertse. The film stars Evita Rozenberg, Manuel Broekman, Tim Murck and Hanna Verboom. Set several years after the original show, The plot revolves around old and new members of the student fraternity H.S.C. Mercurius, who are invited to the opening party of the new school year.

Feuten: Het Feestje was released in Dutch theatres on October 24, 2013, and received mostly negative reviews. The film was awarded the Golden Film.

== Plot ==
The 18 year old Elias and 17 year old Lieve are friends, but not a couple, and move together to Amsterdam for their studies. During introduction week they encounter former student Bram, who invites them to a party for the students of the H.S.C. Mercurius fraternity taking place that evening. Lieve asks Bram if he will join the party, who refuses at first as he hasn't been a student for years at this point, but changed his mind to maybe when he feels nostalgic about his college years. He calls his friends, if they want to join him, which they do.

Long-term student Olivier is joining the party as well. Following a long line of complaints about their fraternity, the police attempt to prohibit the party from happening, however it is held anyway. Lieve goes to the party, mainly because of Bram. Her friend, Elias, hesitated and would in turn arrive later. By accident and against his will, upon arrival Elias is registered as an aspiring member.

After their orders are ignored, the police arrive to shut down the event. Elias sees Lieve going upstairs with Bram. Before he could follow, he was stopped by Beeksma and Noordzij, who inform him only members of the club have access to the upper level. Beeksma and Noordzij decide to prank Elias, but they accidentally let a cask of beer fall on a police car. Elias watches Lieve and Bram again, but Lieve is not impressed by Elias' appearance at the party. Irritated and angry, Elias goes outside and but bumps into a police officer, who hits him, making him turnaround and go back inside. A girl he met earlier tends to his wound. Olivier takes a picture of the wound and posts it on Twitter, which frames Elias as a prominent member of the fraternity who was a victim of police violence, turning him into a hero. The conflict between the party-goers and the police begins to escalate, with the latter deciding to call in reinforcements and letting some of the party-goers go.

Bram and Lieve almost have sex, but Bram backs out. Lieve is offended by this, and they argue. Meanwhile, Elias is having sex with the girl who looked after his wound, but they are interrupted when he receives a phone call from a sad Lieve, and Elias immediately goes to her.

Some of the people, including Elias and Lieve, obey the police's order and leave the party, while some others remain. Elias changes his mind, and returns to the girl he was sleeping with. Bram is picked up by his wife and child. Olivier surrenders himself to the cops, hoping that the authorities won't shut down the fraternity. The police close the place anyway. The party ends in a confrontation between the remaining party-goers and the police. Elias sees the girl he was sleeping with being arrested, so he punches the police officer, which results in them both being arrested.

The film ends with Elias and his new girlfriend opening a new bank account for a new fraternity named H.S.C. Mercurius, at which she is the treasurer. Olivier has been convicted and sentenced to community service, and begins to look for work.

== Cast ==
- Manuel Broekman as Bram Wagtmans
- Evita Rozenberg as Lieve
- Tim Murck as Olivier de Ruyter
- Hanna Verboom as Marie-Claire de Ruyter
- Jurjen van Loon as Edward Beeksma
- Ruben Brinkman as Noordzij
- Anna Speller as Nina de Wit
- Judith Noyons as Irene
- Teun Kuilboer as Police Officer Remco
- Marcel Musters as Police Officer Simon
- Willem Voogd as Eric van Earnewoude
- Korneel Evers as Maurin
- Thijs Steenkamp as Hartog
- Jochum van der Woude as Jeroen Beeksma
- Halina Reijn as Femke

== Production ==
Feuten: Het Feestje was a stand-alone continuation of the BNN television series Feuten. Both Lourens Blok and Willem Bosch reprised their duties from the earlier series, as director and screenwriter respectively. The production took place in Amsterdam with the main party being filmed at the Zonneplein.

== Release ==
The original release date for the film was October 24, 2013, but a fan that had the Feuten-app installed, an app that allowed fans one-week early access to the episodes of the show, started a petition in jest that demanded the release date to be moved up by a week. The petition proved to be a major success, receiving over five thousand signatures, with distributor Independent Films announcing that the film would be released on October 17, 2013.

== Reception ==
The movie received mostly negative reviews from critics, who contended that only you should watch it if you are already an existing fan of the series.

The film was awarded with the Golden Film having past 100.000 visitors at the box office almost a month after release.
