= SpangaS op Survival =

2009 Dutch teen adventure film

- Theatrical release poster
- Directed by: Diede in 't Veld
- Screenplay by: Anya Koek
- Based on: SpangaS by Anya Koek
- Produced by: Johan Nijenhuis; Alain de Levita
- Starring: Steef Hupkes; Judy Doorman; Fatma Genç; Cees Gerdes; Jasper Gottlieb; Marius Gottlieb; Titia Hoogendoorn; Mounira Hadj Mansour
- Cinematography: Maarten van Keller
- Edited by: Yamal Stitou
- Music by: Martijn Schimmer; Mario Zapata
- Production companies: Nijenhuis & de Levita Film & TV; NCRV
- Distributed by: Walt Disney Studios Motion Pictures, Netherlands (Note: Distributed under the Walt Disney Pictures banner.)
- Release date: 30 September 2009
- Running time: 90 minutes
- Country: Netherlands
- Language: Dutch
- Box office: $2.6 million

SpangaS op Survival is a 2009 Dutch teen adventure film based on the Dutch TV series SpangaS. The film is directed by Diede in 't Veld and produced by Johan Nijenhuis and Alain de Levita. The plot revolves around the students from Spangalis College going on a week-long study trip in the Belgian Ardennes where they complete various assignments. Most of the cast from the TV show reprise their respective roles.

The film was released in the Netherlands on 30 September 2009 by Walt Disney Studios Motion Pictures International through the Walt Disney Pictures banner. It was the first of two films Disney distributed under a distribution deal with NL Film & TV, with the second film being Fuchsia the Mini-Witch in 2010. Despite receiving negative reviews from critics, it won a Golden Film award for having drawn over 100,000 visitors and grossed over $2.6 million at the box office. A stand-alone sequel, SpangaS in Actie, was released in 2015.

== Plot ==
The students of Spangalis College go on an active week-long study trip to the Ardennes Forest in Belgium. Teacher Jochem Damstra accompanies them as does English teacher Madge Johnson. Arriving in the forest near the base camp, the students are supposed to work in teams to complete all kinds of tasks, but this is not without its problems. As a result, they sometimes even end up in dangerous situations. During the highlight of the work week, the “dropping”, there is fierce competition between the two groups and the certainty of a good outcome is far from certain. Working together is necessary to safely find their way back to camp.

Flip and Tobias van Hamel are twin brothers. Flip is openly gay; his boyfriend Koen, who is not going with him, breaks up with him, but they still kiss each other as a farewell. Tobias incites Flip to bully him, such as throwing away a stuffed toy to which Irmak Sertkaya is attached. Tobias also squeezes a tube of honey empty into someone's bag. As a result, they get into a fight.

Barry Hartveld is out of school and comes on his own. He is not allowed to join the program, but hangs around with the students. Barry is in love with Lana van Hamel and even kisses her. When Nassim Gharbi discovers them, he becomes furious. He immediately puts a stop to his relationship with Lana and flies at Barry. The two go at it fist, while Lana and Jolé van Haagendoorn look on.

During the drop, which is done in two competing teams, the weather suddenly turns very bad with storms and thunderstorms. Tobias changes a clue, causing the other group including Flip, Avalanche Blokland, Annabella Vermeulen and Luxor de Haan to get lost and have to spend a night in a cave. On the way there, Flip falls and hears a crack around his arm. Tobias paranormally feels Flip's pain. Luxor discovers that the arm is only dislocated. It is reset and Flip is given a sling made from Marjana El Asmi's headscarf.

The next morning, the weather has improved and they head back to base camp. Luxor, who had earlier copied the clue found, is still able to interpret it correctly, so they find their way back. The group with Tobias sets out on one of the rafts to look for the other group, which stays away for a long time. However, the river is still wild due to the precipitation that night, so the boat overturns. Fay nearly drowns in the process and has to be resuscitated. Everyone eventually returns to safety.

== Cast ==
- Gaby Blaaser as Jolé van Haagendoorn
- Judy Doorman as Madge Johnson
- Fatma Genç as Irmak Sertkaya
- Cees Gerdes as Sydney Huibers
- Jasper Gottlieb as Flip van Hamel
- Marius Gottlieb as Tobias van Hamel
- Mounira Hadj Mansour as Marjana El Asmi
- Titia Hoogendoorn as Fay Picaroon
- Steef Hupkes as Jochem Damstra
- Yamill Jones as Samson Mijaards
- Kimberley Klaver as Annabella Vermeulen
- Talisia Misiedjan as Avalanche Blokland
- Tim Murck as Barry Hartveld
- Roos Smit as Lana van Hamel
- Chemseddine Amar as Nassim Gharbi
- Sebastian Wulff as Luxor de Haan
- Jeffrey Hamilton as Koen van Wageningen
- Vincent Moes as Frank van Hamel
- Gaby Milder as Rozalie Mokketier
- Pepijn van Halderen as Kars ter Veldt
- Felix Burleson as Aldert Kalkhoven
- Klaas Hulst as Luxor's Father

== Release ==
=== Critical response ===
The film received negative reviews from critics. Bor Beekman of De Volkskrant stated in his review that the fans of the show won't be disappointed by the film, but that it isn't special or clever. "Here and there the acting is too clumsy, the story too transparent and the decoration and despite a single impressive crane shot - it's a bit disappointing".

Fritz de Jong wrote in his review for Het Parool that "Despite all the stunts and the crafty camerawork, SpangaS remains stuck in schematically worked out soap scenes. The target audience expects nothing else and obediently hands over their money to the producers. There is nothing wrong with that in itself, but it does not make for a good film either".

=== Home media ===
The film was released on DVD and Blu-ray in the Netherlands by Walt Disney Studios Home Entertainment on 10 February 2010. Both releases include a 30-minute Behind the Scenes featurette and the music video Morgen by Dutch-Moroccan singer Hind.

== See also ==
- Serengeti Symphony
