= Vivienne van den Assem =

Dutch actress and presenter (born 1983)

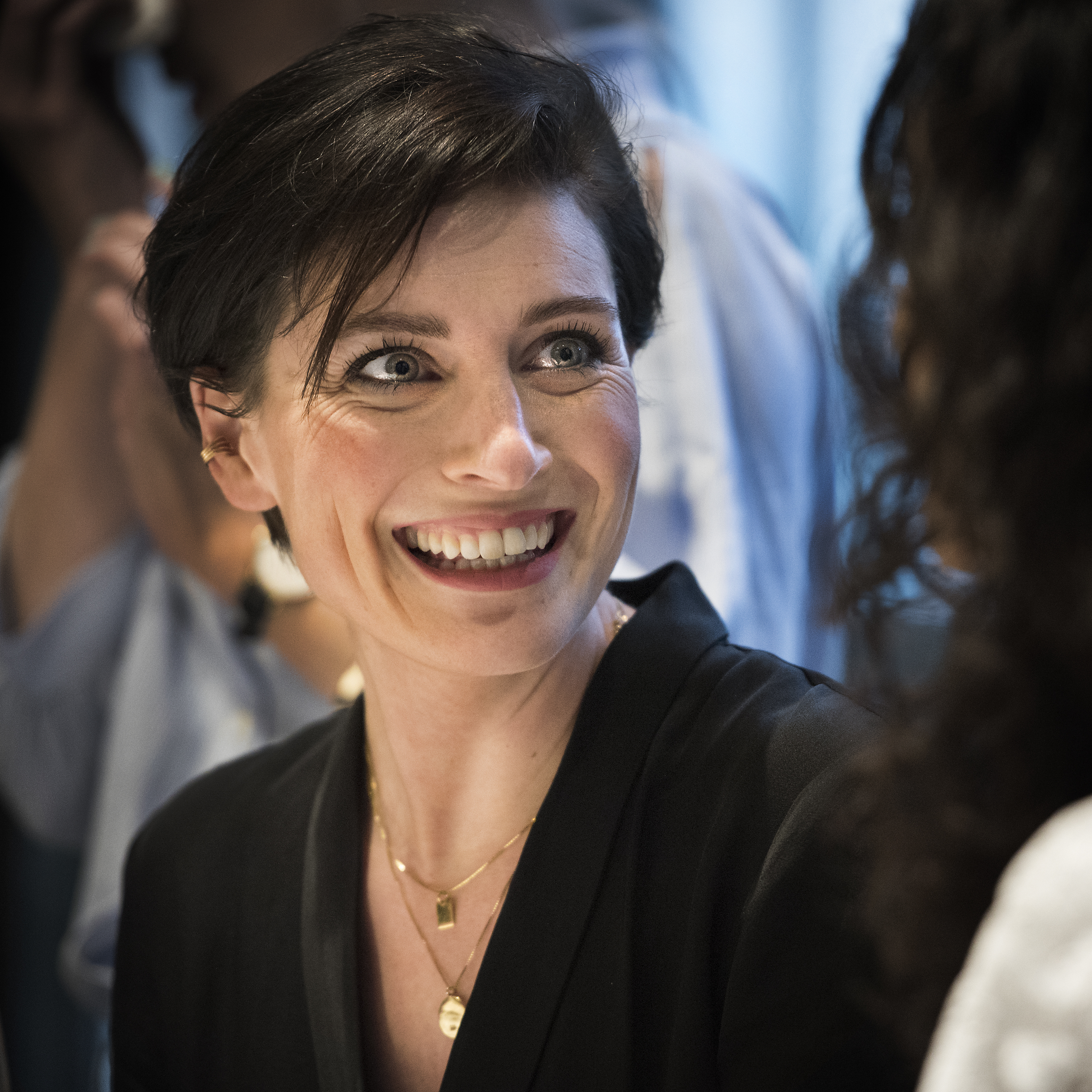
- Van den Assem in 2018
- Born: Vivienne Linette van den Assem; 15 November 1983 (age 41); Oud-Beijerland, Netherlands
- Occupations: Actress; presenter
- Website: Official website

Vivienne Linette van den Assem (born 15 November 1983) is a Dutch actress and presenter.

== Life ==
=== Youth ===
Van den Assem spent her childhood in Oud-Beijerland. She attended the atheneum at the CSG Willem van Oranje. In her fourth class of the atheneum, she combined school with acting. In the summer holidays between the fifth and sixth year she moved to The Hague. Van den Assem completed the atheneum and followed a course in production support at the Netherlands Film and Television Academy.

=== Career ===
After she started acting, dancing and singing at Jeugdtheater Hofplein from her thirteenth lessons, she got her first role in Goudkust as Sophie Bergman. She fulfilled her role from 2000 to 2001. Then she played in the film Emergency Exit and she started the role of Lizzy Vehmeijer in Onderweg naar Morgen. She fulfilled her last role until 2003.

In the theatre van den Assem played in De Bruiloft (1998), Nieuwe Gods (1999), Twelfth Night (2000) and En als het mijn beurt is zal ik zeggen dat het prachtig was en dat ik het voor geen goud had willen missen (2001).

Van den Assem played in Zoop on Nickelodeon and the films Zoop in Africa and Zoop in India. Van den Assem only saw a few scenes in Zoop in South America that were all recorded in the Netherlands.

In the period from 2004 to 2007 Van den Assem, together with Chris Silos, presented the television programme At Nick on Nickelodeon. On the occasion of the World Cup 2006, the variation Nick At Goes WK was made.

As a substitute for At Nick, Van den Assem presented Supernick together with Patrick Martens around 2007.

Van den Assem presented together with Chris Silos the Nickelodeon Netherlands Kids' Choice Awards of 2005, in 2007 she also did this, then together with Patrick Martens. In 2007 she herself was nominated in the category Best TV Star, she ended behind actress Loek Beernink. She received awards at the Nickelodeon Kids' Choice Awards of 2005 in Rotterdam Ahoy:

- Best TV Star
- Best Film (Zoop in Africa)
- Best Television Programme (Zoop)

Besides acting she is also active in the music world, she sang on the singles; Wat ik wil met Kerstmis... ben jij! and Kon het elke dag maar Kerstmis zijn.

Since 2006 Van den Assem is the ambassador of Kids against Violence.

Van den Assem dubbed in 2007 of the penguin Lani in the Dutch version of the animated film Surf's Up. She also dubbed EVE in the Disney Pixar film WALL-E.

From 2008 Van den Assem performs the role of Sonja Zelenko in the Dutch crime series Deadline (VARA). In 2009 Van den Assem participated in Wie is de Mol? in Northern Ireland and Jordan. She won the game, and got a pot of 22,650 euros, with as mole Jon van Eerd.

From October 2010 she takes the presentation of Te leuk om waar te zijn for Zapp for her account. She also gave the points for the Netherlands in the final of the Eurovision Song Contest 2012.

Since 2016 she is one of the presenters of the morning programme Goedemorgen Nederland at NPO 1.

From 2 January 2017 she was in the new programming on NPO Radio 2. Van den Assem will present once a week from 02:00 to 04:00.

She appeared in the 2024 season of the television show The Masked Singer.

== Filmography/Television ==
=== Films ===
Year	Title	Role
2000	De Straat	–
2001	Emergency Exit	Suzanne
2004	Gay	–
2005	Zoop in Africa	Elise Pardoel
2006	Het Woeden der Gehele Wereld	Ruth Oberstein
2006	Zoop in India	Elise Pardoel
2006	Piet Piraat en het Vliegende Schip	Marilyn
2006	Het mysterie van de verdwenen kerstcadeautjes	Herself
2007	Zoop in South America	Elise Pardoel
2007	Surf's Up	Lani
2008	WALL-E	EVE
2009	Wat is daarop uw antwoord?	Deborah
2012	Mees Kees	Juf Sanne
2014	Mees Kees op de planken	Juf Sanne
2016	Hart Beat	Lilian

=== TV series ===
Years	Title	Role
2000–01	Goudkust	Sophie Bergman
2001–03	Onderweg naar Morgen	Lizzy Vehmeijer
2004–06	Zoop	Elise Pardoel
2006	Man & Paard	Robin Willems
2008–10	Deadline	Sonja Zelenko
2012	Zaak Zappendael	Herself
2012	Zaak Zappendael: The Movie	Herself
2013	Flikken Maastricht	Informant Tonja Lacroix
2015	Meiden van de Herengracht	Fashion designer Reina Borst

=== Guest roles ===
Year	Title	Role
2002	Trauma 24/7	Sandra de Ridder
2006	Juliana	Anna Roëll

== Presentation ==
Years	Title	Role
2004–05	Kids Choice Journaal	Presenter
2005–07	At Nick	Presenter
2005, 2007	Nickelodeon Netherlands Kids' Choice Awards	Presenter
2006, 2008	Veerhaven Junior Concert	Presenter
2007	Bij Sinterklaas	Presenter
2007	De Nieuwste Show	Reporter
2007	Supernick	Presenter
2009	Wie is de Mol?	Participant; Winner
2010	Wie wordt Kruimeltje?	Presenter
2010–13	Te leuk om waar te zijn	Presenter
2010–13	Zapp Sport	Presenter
2011–12	Mijn vader is de beste	Presenter
2012	Nationaal Songfestival	Presenter
2012	Ambassadeur voor 1 dag	Presenter
2012	Eurovision Song Contest 2012	Gave points on behalf of the Netherlands
2012–13	Spetterslot	Pressenter
2013–14	Zapplive	Pressenter
2013–present	Schooltv - Nieuws uit de Natuur	Pressenter
2014	Zapp your planet	Participant
2015	MolTalk	Presenter
2016–present	Goedemorgen Nederland	Presenter

== Discography ==
Single with possible hit notation(s) in the Dutch Top 40	Year	Date of entry	No. of weeks	Highest position	Comments
Wat ik wil met Kerstmis... ben jij!	2005	24 Dec 2005	10	3	with Kus and Chris Silos
Kon het elke dag maar Kerstmis zijn	2006	23 Dec 2006	6	3	with Kus, Chris Silos and René Froger
Bij sinterklaas!	2006	25 Dec 2006	–	–	Single for programme Bij Sinterklaas
