= Zoop in India =

2006 Dutch film directed by Johan Nijenhuis

- Theatrical release poster
- Directed by: Johan Nijenhuis
- Written by: Anya Koek; Wijo Koek; Johan Nijenhuis (concept)
- Produced by: Alain De Levita; Johan Nijenhuis
- Cinematography: Maarten van Keller
- Edited by: Sandor Soeteman
- Music by: Martijn Schimmer
- Distributed by: Independent Films
- Release date: 29 June 2006
- Running time: 103 minutes
- Country: Netherlands
- Language: Dutch
- Box office: $2,081,934

Zoop in India is a 2006 Dutch family film. It is a sequel to Zoop in Africa (2005) and is followed by Zoop in South America (2007).

The film received a Golden Film award in 2006 for selling 100,000 cinema tickets in the Netherlands.

== Plot ==
When former ranger Alwin returns to his friends, it soon becomes clear that this isn’t just a casual visit. Alwin asks the seven other rangers to accompany him to India. A herd of elephants has gone missing there, and Alwin wants to find them with the rangers’ help.

The rangers decide to travel to India with Alwin to track down the poachers and the elephants. The group splits into two teams; one team heads into the Indian jungle, while the other goes to the city. During their search, the rangers find themselves in various dangerous situations. For instance, they nearly fall through a rickety bridge, have to navigate a cave filled with poisonous snakes, and engage in a fight with the poachers. Eventually, they successfully manage to find the missing elephants and bring them back to the village.

== Cast ==
- Juliette van Ardenne as Sira Schilt
- Vivienne van den Assem as Elise Pardoel
- Erwan van Buuren as Alwin Bendorff
- Nicolette van Dam as Bionda Kroonenberg
- Ewout Genemans as Bastiaan van Diemen
- Jon Karthaus as Moes Brinksma
- Patrick Martens as Mike Bosboom
- Monique van der Werff as Taffie Arends
- Tarun Anand as Thakur
- Tygo Gernandt as Dutch voice of Thakur
- Kim Boekhoorn as Filo Schilt
- Marco Borsato as himself
- Ernst Löw as Siegfried Schilt
- Pieternel Pouwels as Maxime Schilt
