= Alice in Glamourland =

- Theatrical release poster
- Directed by: Pieter Kramer
- Written by: Mischa Alexander
- Produced by: Alain De Levita; Johan Nijenhuis
- Starring: Linda de Mol; Joan Collins; Chris Tates; Kees Hulst; Tjitske Reidinga
- Cinematography: Piotr Kukla
- Edited by: Elja de Lange
- Music by: Martijn Schimmer
- Production companies: Nijenhuis & de Levita Film & TV; TROS
- Distributed by: Independent Films (Theatrical); Universal Pictures; (Home media)
- Release date: 30 September 2004
- Running time: 95 minutes
- Country: Netherlands
- Languages: Dutch; English
- Box office: $1,579,799

Alice in Glamourland (Dutch: Ellis in Glamourland) is a 2004 Dutch comedy film, directed by Pieter Kramer and produced by Alain De Levita and Johan Nijenhuis, starring Linda de Mol and Joan Collins. The story is about a poor single mother, who participates in a course about 'How to marry a millionaire'.

The film received a Golden Film (100,000 visitors).

== Plot ==
A poor, single woman called Ellis (Linda de Mol), with a son, who meets Susan (Joan Collins), who wrote a successful book about 'How to marry a millionaire' and who now teaches classes on the subject.

Ellis attends the course, which is offered her for free. As a result, she meets many millionaires, of which several want to marry her. For one man who seemed rich, this turns out not to be the case. Nevertheless, after all Ellis chooses him.

== Cast ==
- Linda de Mol as Ellis Vermeulen
- Joan Collins as Susan
- Chris Tates as Gijs
- Kees Hulst as Meindert Jan

== Accolades ==
- Golden Film for 100,000 visitors in the Netherlands (2004)
- Golden Calf for Best Screenplay of a Feature Film (2004) for Mischa Alexander
- Award for Best Feature at the Stony Brook Film Festival (2005) for Pieter Kramer
