= Independent Films =

Dutch film distributor

- Logo used since 2001
- Type: Besloten vennootschap
- Industry: Film distribution
- Founded: 2000; 26 years ago
- Founder: Marc Punt
- Products: Motion pictures
- Parent: Belga Films
- Website: independentfilms.nl

Independent Films is a Dutch film distributor founded in 2000 formely owned by Belga Films.

== History ==
The first incarnation of Independent Films was founded in 1986 by Marc Punt and Jan Verheyen as a distributor for the Belgian film market. In 1995, the company was acquired by PolyGram Filmed Entertainment, with Independent being used as a brand name until it was quietly discontinued in the late 90s.

In 2000, Marc Punt relaunched Independent Films as a Dutch distributor following the closure of the theatrical unit of Universal Pictures Benelux. The company focuses on distributing films from Belga Films and Dutch FilmWorks for the Netherlands.

in 2022, Belga Films, who had 50% stake in the company, announced they would acquire Independent Films while Marc Punt would leave the company to focus on writing and producing.

== Home media distribution ==
Before 2007, the company's home media releases were handled by Universal Pictures Benelux. Universal also received studio and billing credit on some of the Dutch films they released. In 2007, the company signed a distribution deal with Warner Home Video.

== Filmography ==
=== Dutch films ===
Release Date	Title	Notes
2000s
10 October 2002	Full Moon Party	Produced by Nijenhuis & de Levita Film & TV and BBN; studio credit and home media distribution by Universal Pictures Benelux
25 June 2003	De Schippers van de Kameleon	Home media distribution by Bridge Pictures
20 November 2003	Pipo and the P-P-Pearl Knight	Produced by Endemol and TROS; studio credit and home media distribution by Universal Pictures Benelux
11 December 2003	Father's Affair	Produced by 24fps Productions and VARA; studio credit and home media distribution by Universal Pictures Benelux
29 January 2004	Hush Hush Baby	Produced by Theorema Films and VARA; studio credit and home media distribution by Universal Pictures Benelux
30 September 2004	Alice in Glamourland	Produced by Nijenhuis & de Levita Film & TV and TROS; studio credit and home media distribution by Universal Pictures Benelux
16 December 2004	Floris	Produced by Nijenhuis & de Levita Film & TV and Katholieke Radio Omroep; studio credit and home media distribution by Universal Pictures Benelux
3 February 2005	Off Screen	Produced by Rinkel Film and VPRO; home media distribution by Universal Pictures Benelux
16 June 2005	Kameleon 2	Home media distribution by Bridge Pictures
14 July 2005	Zoop in Africa	Produced by Nijenhuis & de Levita Film & TV
8 September 2005	Schnitzel Paradise	Produced by Lemming Film and NPS; studio credit and home media distribution by Universal Pictures Benelux
29 June 2006	Zoop in India	Produced by Nijenhuis & de Levita Film & TV
7 September 2006	Buddha's Lost Children	Home media distribution by Warner Home Video
9 November 2006	Wild Romance	
14 February 2007	Ernst, Bobbie, en de geslepen Onix	
19 July 2007	Zoop in South America	Produced by Nijenhuis & de Levita Film & TV
20 December 2007	Killer Babes	Produced by Parachute Pictures, Tom de Mol Productions and RTL Entertainment; home media distribution by Warner Home Video
24 January 2008	Nothing to Lose	Produced by Pupkin Film and BBN; home media distribution by Warner Home Video
9 February 2008	Alibi	Produced by Nijenhuis & de Levita Film & TV and NCRV; home media distribution by Warner Home Video
20 March 2008	Summer Heat	Home media distribution by Warner Home Video
17 April 2008	Dunya and Desie	Home media distribution by Warner Home Video
8 October 2008	Anubis en het Pad der 7 Zonden	
11 December 2008	The Silent Army	
19 February 2009	Stella's oorlog	Home media distribution by Warner Home Video
14 October 2009	Het Sinterklaasjournaal: De Meezing Moevie	Produced by Pupkin Film and NPS; home media distribution by Warner Home Video
2010s
11 March 2010	Two Eyes Staring	Home media distribution by Warner Home Video
30 September 2010	Tirza	Home media distribution by Warner Home Video
16 December 2010	Loft	Home media distribution by Warner Home Video
10 March 2011	Gooische Vrouwen	
14 April 2011	Time to Spare	Home media distribution by Warner Home Video
3 January 2012	Manslaughter	
19 January 2012	Süskind	
23 February 2012	Taped	
17 October 2013	Feuten: Het Feestje	
3 April 2014	Accused	
4 December 2014	Gooische Vrouwen 2	
2020s
22 December 2022	De Tatta's	Produced by Talent United Film & TV and Brabant Films
14 December 2023	De Tatta's 2	Produced by Talent United Film & TV and Brabant Films

=== 2000s ===
==== 2000 ====
- American Pie (24/02/00)
- An Ideal Husband (22/06/00)
- The Ninth Gate (01/06/00)
- Nurse Betty (16/11/00)
- Pi (08/06/00)
- Play It to the Bone (27/07/00)
- Rules of Engagement (09/11/00)
- Stir of Echoes (03/08/00)
- Things You Can Tell Just by Looking at Her (19/10/00)
- U-571 (28/09/00)
- The Virgin Suicides (21/09/00)
- Wrongfully Accused (29/06/00)

==== 2001 ====
- Bless the Child (30/08/01)
- The Contender (06/09/01)
- Dr. T & the Women (05/04/01)
- Dungeons & Dragons (26/04/01)
- Help! I'm a Fish (04/10/01)
- The Legend of Bagger Vance (17/05/01)
- The Little Vampire (12/04/01)
- Memento (08/03/01)
- Ordinary Decent Criminal (18/01/01)
- Requiem for a Dream (13/09/01)
- Sexy Beast (11/10/01)
- Shadow of the Vampire (12/04/01)
- The Watcher (18/01/01)
- Bandits (13/12/01)
- Heartbreakers (09/08/01)
- K-PAX (25/04/01)

==== 2002 ====
- Das Experiment (06/06/02)
- Ghost World (14/02/02)
- Jeepers Creepers (14/02/02)
- Killing Me Softly (30/05/02)
- Monster's Ball (02/05/02)
- The Mothman Prophecies (04/04/02)
- My Big Fat Greek Wedding (14/11/02)
- Nine Queens (07/11/02)
- Resident Evil (12/09/02)
- Das Sams (04/07/02)

==== 2003 ====
- Adaptation (06/03/03)
- Dragon Hill, la colina del dragón (2002)
- Gerry (01/05/03)
- The Good Girl (27/02/03)
- Intacto (21/08/03)
- Stones (17/07/03)
- Wrong Turn (14/08/03)

==== 2004 ====
- Around the World in 80 Days (12/08/04)
- Connie and Carla (09/12/04)
- Immortal (02/12/04)
- Michel Vaillant (04/03/04)
- Mindhunters (08/07/04)
- Open Range (03/06/04)
- Open Water (25/11/04)
- People I Know (13/05/04)
- Twisted (02/09/04)

==== 2005 ====
- The Assassination of Richard Nixon (12/05/05)
- Assault on Precinct 13 (31/03/05)
- The Aviator (20/01/05)
- Boogeyman (24/04/05)
- Crash (20/10/05)
- Creep (04/08/05)
- Five Children and It (20/01/05)
- The Grudge (06/01/05)
- Hostage (26/05/05)
- Inside Deep Throat (10/11/05)
- The Jacket (25/08/05)
- Keeping Mum (22/12/05)
- The Long Weekend (13/10/05)
- Racing Stripes (03/02/05)
- Sahara (14/07/05)
- An Unfinished Life (15/12/05)
- The Upside of Anger (23/06/05)
- Valiant (28/07/05)
- White Noise (14/04/05)

==== 2006 ====
- Asterix and the Vikings (20/04/06)
- Babel (02/11/06)
- Bandidas (16/03/06)
- Basic Instinct 2 (30/03/06)
- Edison (09/03/06)
- The Grudge 2 (19/10/06)
- The Ice Harvest (02/02/06)
- Lucky Number Slevin (20/04/06)
- Prime (14/02/06)
- Saw II (05/01/06)
- Step Up (24/08/06)
- Stormbreaker (12/10/06)
- The Three Burials of Melquiades Estrada (16/03/06)
- Two for the Money (26/01/06)
- The World's Fastest Indian (04/05/06)

==== 2007 ====
- Arthur and the Minimoys (01/02/07)
- Bordertown (30/08/07)
- Days of Glory (18/01/07)
- Earth (29/11/07)
- The Hoax (24/05/07)
- Happily N'Ever After (26/04/07)
- I Could Never Be Your Woman (29/11/07)
- The Illusionist (04/01/07)
- Live! (01/11/07)
- Michael Clayton (25/10/07)
- P.S. I Love You (20/12/07)
- Saw III (04/01/07)
- Shark Bait (17/05/07)
- Shoot 'Em Up (11/10/07)

==== 2008 ====
- The Accidental Husband (04/09/08)
- Deception (11/09/08)
- Dragon Hunters (24/05/08)
- The Forbidden Kingdom (28/08/08)
- Nim's Island (07/08/08)
- Sex Drive (16/10/08)
- Space Chimps (09/10/08)
- Step Up 2: The Streets (21/02/08)
- Taken (01/05/08)
- Twilight (04/12/08)
- Winx Club: The Secret of the Lost Kingdom (17/04/08)
- The Women (27/11/08)

==== 2009 ====
- Arthur and the Revenge of Maltazard (10/12/09)
- Bandslam (27/08/09)
- Carriers (24/09/09)
- City of Ember (12/02/09)
- Knowing (09/04/09)
- The Twilight Saga: New Moon (19/11/09)
- Red Cliff (06/08/09)
- Street Fighter: The Legend of Chun Li (07/05/09)
- Sunshine Barry & the Disco Worms (30/07/09)
- Totally Spies! The Movie (15/10/09)

=== 2010s ===
==== 2010 ====
- Astro Boy (04/02/10)
- The Hurt Locker (11/02/10)
- I Love You Phillip Morris (22/04/10)
- Mr. Nobody (03/06/10)
- Planet 51 (29/04/10)
- Remember Me (01/04/10)
- The Runaways (04/11/10)
- Step Up 3D (05/08/10)
- The Twilight Saga: Eclipse (01/07/10)
- Vicky the Viking (22/04/10)

==== 2011 ====
- Flypaper (01/09/11)
- The Ides of March (20/10/11)
- The Resident (07/04/11)
- Skyline (03/02/11)
- The Tree of Life (02/06/11)
- The Twilight Saga: Breaking Dawn – Part 1 (16/11/11)

==== 2012 ====
- Bel Ami (05/04/12)
- Chasing Mavericks (25/10/12)
- End of Watch (18/10/12)
- Hit & Run (23/08/12)
- The Hunger Games (21/03/12)
- So Undercover (20/12/12)
- Step Up Revolution (25/07/12)
- Taken 2 (22/11/12)
- The Twilight Saga: Breaking Dawn – Part 2 (15/11/12)
- Vicky and the Treasure of the Gods (23/05/12)

==== 2013 ====
- Beautiful Creatures (28/02/13)
- The Company You Keep (23/05/13)
- Frits & Franky (14/02/13)
- Empire State (26/09/13)
- The Frozen Ground (11/07/13)
- Girl Most Likely (18/07/13)
- The Host (28/03/13)
- The Hunger Games: Catching Fire (21/11/13)
- The Impossible (17/01/13)
- Machete Kills (24/10/13)
- The Family (31/10/13)
- The Place Beyond the Pines (04/04/13)
- Prisoners (19/09/13)
- Rush (03/10/13)
- Side Effects (14/03/13)
- Snitch (18/04/13)
- Spring Breakers (11/04/13)
- Stand Up Guys (21/03/13)
- Tarzan (19/12/13)
- Tad, The Lost Explorer (14/02/13)
- Warm Bodies (25/04/13)
- The Young and Prodigious T. S. Spivet (14/11/13)

==== 2014 ====
- 12 Years a Slave (20/02/14)
- 3 Days to Kill (20/03/14)
- Dallas Buyers Club (23/01/14)
- Divergent (03/04/14)
- The Face of Love (08/05/14)
- The House of Magic (17/04/14)
- The Homesman (24/07/14)
- I, Frankenstein (30/01/14)
- Maya the Bee (09/10/14)
- Lucy (31/07/14)
- Non-Stop (27/02/14)
- The Quiet Ones (08/05/14)
- Sabotage (15/05/14)
- Samba (13/11/14)
- Sin City: A Dame to Kill For (28/08/14)
- Step Up: All In (10/07/14)
- The Hunger Games: Mockingjay – Part 1 (20/11/14)
- Transcendence (19/06/14)

==== 2015 ====
- Ooops! Noah Is Gone... (16/07/15)
- Child 44 (07/05/15)
- The Little Prince (29/07/15)
- La Famille Bélier (16/04/15)
- The Divergent Series: Insurgent (18/03/15)
- The Gunman (26/03/15)
- The Hunger Games: Mockingjay – Part 2 (18/11/15)
- The Last Witch Hunter (22/10/15)
- Mortdecai (19/02/15)
- Paddington (12/02/15)
- Sicario (08/10/15)
- Taken 3 (15/01/15)

==== 2016 ====
- Ballerina (21/12/16)
- Blair Witch (15/09/16)
- Deepwater Horizon (29/09/16)
- Elle (02/06/16)
- Gods of Egypt (25/02/16)
- La La Land (22/02/16)
- Nine Lives (05/10/16)
- Moonwalkers (31/03/16)
- Nerve (22/09/16)
- Now You See Me 2 (09/06/16)
- Pride and Prejudice and Zombies (18/02/16)
- Robinson Crusoe (18/02/16)
- Sing Street (17/11/16)
- Shut In (01/12/16)
- Snowden (10/11/16)
- The Divergent Series: Allegiant (10/03/16)
- The Nice Guys (19/05/16)
- The Sea of Trees (12/05/16)

==== 2017 ====
- American Assassin (12/10/17)
- The Son of Bigfoot (26/07/17)
- C'est la vie! (16/11/17)
- Two Is a Family (26/01/17)
- The Glass Castle (19/10/17)
- Human Flow (14/12/17)
- Jigsaw (26/10/17)
- John Wick: Chapter 2 (09/02/17)
- Miss Sloane (23/02/17)
- A Monster Calls (02/02/17)
- My Little Pony: The Movie (12/10/17)
- Overdrive (03/08/17)
- Paddington 2 (06/02/17)
- Patriots Day (12/01/17)
- Power Rangers (23/03/17)
- Stronger (05/01/17)
- Valerian and the City of a Thousand Planets (26/07/17)
- With Open Arms (18/05/17)
- Wonder (23/11/17)
- The Warriors Gate (20/04/17)

==== 2018 ====
- 12 Strong (01/02/18)
- A Simple Favor (27/09/18)
- Ghostland (24/05/18)
- The Guernsey Literary and Potato Peel Pie Society (26/04/18)
- Kursk (06/12/18)
- Kin (20/09/18)
- Loro (01/11/18)
- Midnight Sun (19/04/18)
- Only the Brave (31/05/18)
- Robin Hood (22/11/18)
- Sicario: Day of the Soldado (05/07/18)
- The Spy Who Dumped Me (09/08/18)

==== 2019 ====
- After (18/04/19)
- Anna (12/09/19)
- The Queen's Corgi (14/02/19)
- Bon Dieu 2 (28/03/19)
- The Hummingbird Project (21/03/19)
- John Wick: Chapter 3 – Parabellum (16/05/19)
- The Kill Team (31/10/19)
- Knives Out (28/11/19)
- Long Shot (13/06/19)
- Playmobil: The Movie (08/08/19)

=== 2020s ===
==== 2020 ====
- After We Collided (08/10/20)
- Ava (30/07/20)
- Bigfoot Family (08/10/20)
- Bombshell (16/01/20)
- The Gentlemen (20/02/20)
- Pinocchio (23/07/20)

==== 2021 ====
- After We Fell (02/09/21)
- Benedetta (14/10/21)
- Chaos Walking (24/06/21)
- The Courier (09/09/21)
- The Dissident (09/09/21)
- Extinct (10/06/21)
- Songbird (21/10/21)
- Spiral (10/06/21)

==== 2022 ====
- The 355 (10/03/22)
- After Ever Happy (25/08/22)
- Chickenhare and the Hamster of Darkness (16/02/22)
- The Card Counter (10/02/22)
- Orphan: First Kill (01/09/22)
- The Unbearable Weight of Massive Talent (21/04/22)

==== 2023 ====
- After Everything (13/09/02)
- Dogman (28/09/23)
- The Hunger Games: The Ballad of Songbirds & Snakes (2023)
- Hypnotic (22/06/23)
- John Wick: Chapter 4 (23/03/23)
- Ladybug & Cat Noir: The Movie (05/07/23)
- Mafia Mamma (20/04/23)
- A Cat's Life (19/04/23)
- Saw X (19/10/23)

==== 2024 ====
- Borderlands (08/10/24)
- Cat Person (15/02/24)
- Emmanuelle (26/09/24)
- Heretic (21/11/24)
- Longlegs (11/07/24)
- She Came to Me (18/01/24)
- Sleeping Dogs (21/03/24)
- The Strangers: Chapter 1 (16/05/24)

==== 2025 ====
- Arco (04/12/2025)
- Clown in a Cornfield (14/08/2025)
- Death of a Unicorn (03/04/2025)
- Dracula (31/07/2025)
- Eden (21/08/2025)
- Chickenhare and the Secret of the Groundhog (09/10/2025)
- Hurry Up Tomorrow (15/05/2025)
- The Life of Chuck (05/06/2025)
- Marked Men: Rule + Shaw (06/02/2025)
- Now You See Me: Now You Don't (13/11/2025)
- The Strangers: Chapter 2 (25/09/2025)
- White Bird (24/04/2025)

==== 2026 ====
- I Play Rocky (19/11/26)
- Marty Supreme (19/02/26)
- Sacrifice (15/10/26)
- Sunny Dancer (13/08/26)
