= Fuchsia the Mini-Witch =

2010 Dutch musical fantasy film

- Theatrical release poster
- Directed by: Johan Nijenhuis
- Screenplay by: Sander de Reg
- Based on: Foeksia de Miniheks by: Paul van Loon
- Produced by: Johan Nijenhuis; Alain de Levita
- Starring: Rachelle Verdel; Porgy Franssen; Annet Malherbe; Marcel Hensema; Lorenso van Sligtenhorst
- Cinematography: Maarten van Keller
- Edited by: Job ter Burg
- Music by: Martijn Schimmer; Matthijs Kieboom
- Production companies: NL Film & TV; Katholieke Radio Omroep
- Distributed by: Walt Disney Studios Motion Pictures, Netherlands (Note: Distributed through the Walt Disney Pictures banner.)
- Release date: 6 October 2010
- Running time: 90 minutes
- Country: Netherlands
- Language: Dutch
- Box office: $2.5 million

Fuchsia the Mini-Witch (Dutch: Foeksia de Miniheks) is a 2010 Dutch musical fantasy film directed by Johan Nijenhuis, based on the Dutch book series created by Paul van Loon.

The film was released in the Netherlands on 6 October 2010 by Walt Disney Studios Motion Pictures International through the Walt Disney Pictures banner. It was the second of two films Disney distributed under a distribution deal with Nijenhuis, with the first film being SpangaS op Survival in 2009. The film won a Golden Film award for having 100,000 visitors.

== Plot ==
Kwark the wizard finds an egg in the Witch Forest. A little girl, a mini-witch, hatches from the egg, and he names her Foeksia. Foeksia is allowed to attend the Witches’ School, run by the swamp witch Miss Minuul. Minuul has had a crush on Kwark for fifty years. At school, Foeksia learns to make wind and cast spells with clouds, though her magic often goes wrong due to her overconfidence.

Foeksia uses a little hand broom to fly through the Witch Forest. Kwark has no interest in the human world, which he considers dangerous, but his daughter is curious about it. After Foeksia sees the little boy Tommie in the forest, her curiosity overcomes Kwark’s warnings, and she goes to find Tommie in the human city. Foeksia will have to save the Witch Forest together with Tommie when she discovers that Tommie’s uncle Rogier wants to cut down the Witch Forest to build a highway.

== Cast ==
- Rachelle Verdel as Foeksia
- Lorenso van Sligtenhorst as Tommie
- Porgy Franssen as Kwark
- Annet Malherbe as Juf Minuul
- Sytske van der Ster as Moerasheks Gruwela
- Eefje Paddenburg as Argje
- Valerie Pos as Murmeltje
- Kara Borus as Akabahar
- Melanie Reindertaen as Grit
- Chantal Wildering as Grobje
- Lauren Schuitemaker as Saffraan
- Marcel Hensema as Oom Rogier
- Leny Breederveld as Burgermeester

== Release ==
=== Critical response ===
Fritz de Jong of Het Parool gave the film three stars.

=== Home media ===
The film was released on DVD and Blu-ray in the Netherlands by Walt Disney Studios Home Entertainment on 9 February 2011.

== See also ==
- Serengeti Symphony
