= Zoop in Africa =

2005 film

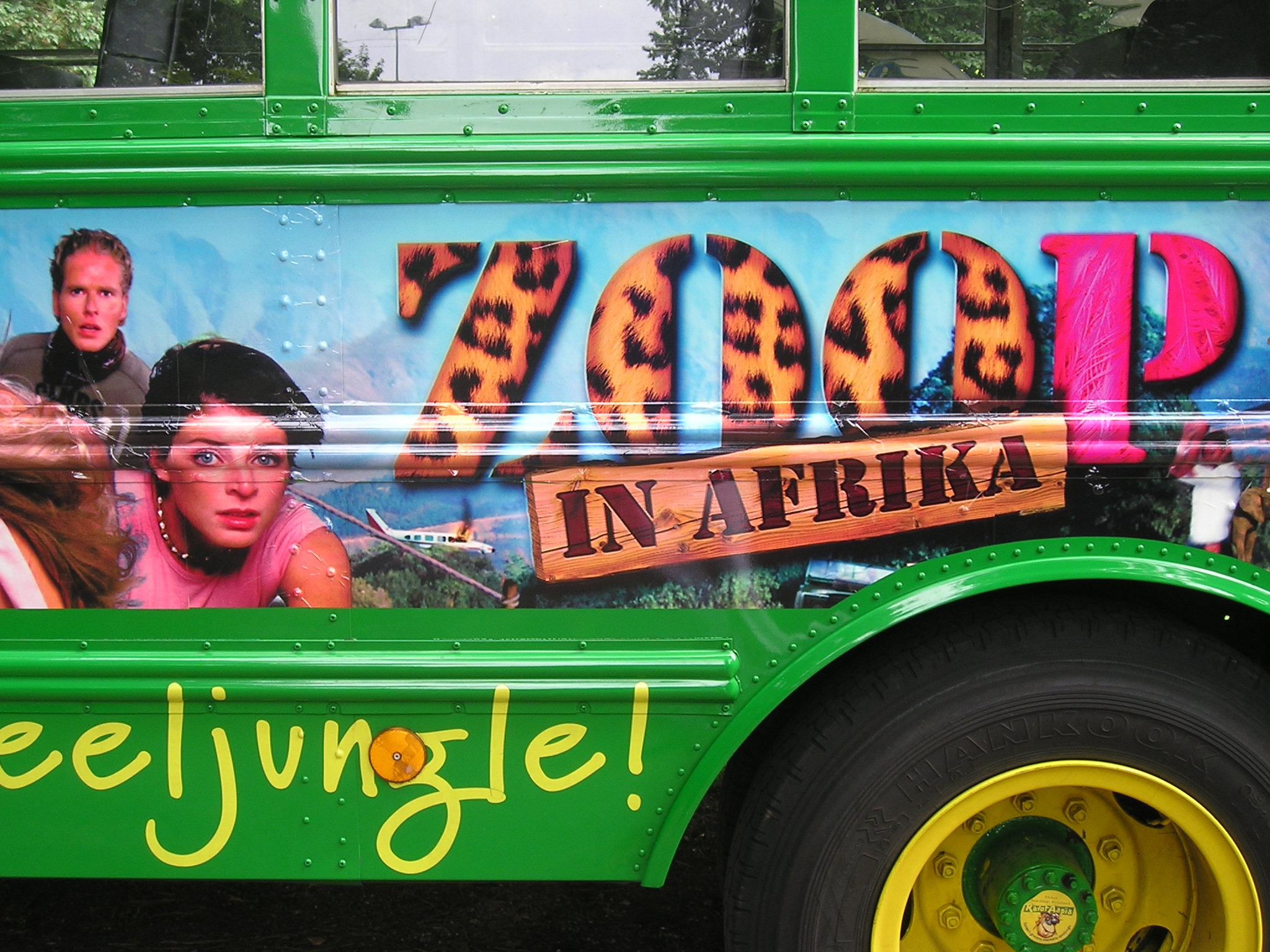
- Zoop in Africa
- Directed by: Dennis Bots; Johan Nijenhuis
- Written by: Anya Koek; Wijo Koek; Johan Nijenhuis
- Produced by: Alain De Levita; Johan Nijenhuis
- Starring: Viviënne van den Assem; Juliette van Ardenne; Nicolette van Dam; Ewout Genemans; Jon Karthaus; Sander Jan Klerk
- Edited by: Sandor Soeteman
- Music by: Martijn Schimmer; Mario Zapata
- Production companies: Nijenhuis & de Levita Film & TV
- Distributed by: Independent Films
- Release date: 14 July 2005
- Running time: 85 minutes
- Country: Netherlands
- Languages: Dutch; English
- Box office: $2,719,805

Zoop in Africa (Dutch: Zoop in Afrika) is a 2005 Dutch adventure film directed by Dennis Bots and Johan Nijenhuis. The film is based on the TV series Zoop and is followed by Zoop in India (2006) and Zoop in South America (2007). The film was recorded on multiple locations in South Africa. Zoop in Africa was sold to 44 countries. The film premiered on July 10, 2005 at the Tuschinski theatre in Amsterdam.

== Plot ==
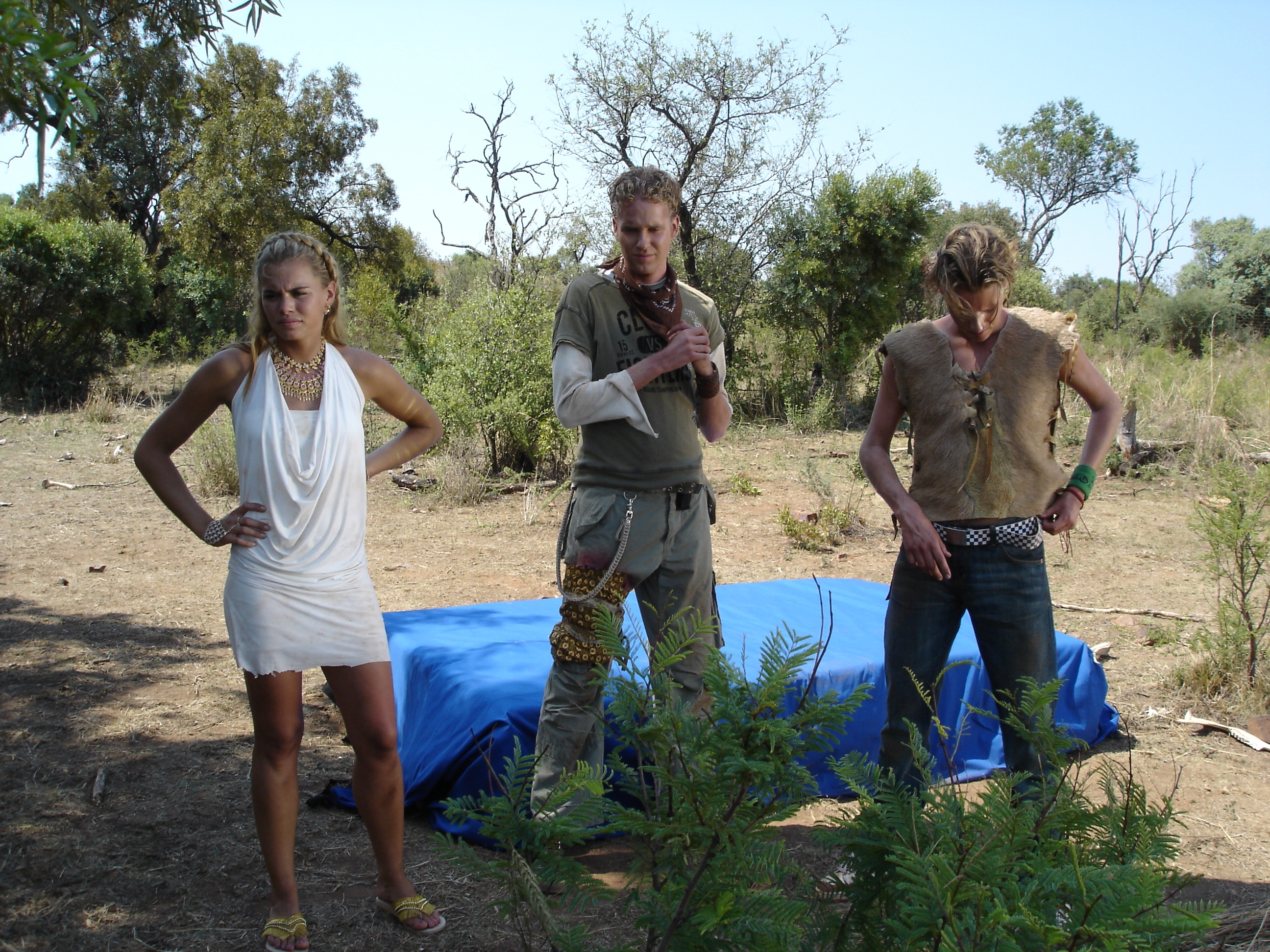
Picture of the filmshoot in Africa

Eight youngsters studying for zookeeper in the Netherlands travel to Africa, to work in a wildpark and enhance their knowledge. During the flight to their destination their plane crashes in the middle of the jungle and they are completely dependent on each other. They decide to split up in two groups in the search for help. Aside from the survival challenge, the owners of the wildpark want to get rid of the rangers too. When Bionda gets lost, things go from bad to worse. Then they encounter an African tribe who doesn't have good intentions either.

== Cast ==
- Viviënne van den Assem (Elise Pardoel)
- Juliette van Ardenne (Sira Schilt)
- Nicolette van Dam (Bionda Kroonenberg)
- Ewout Genemans (Bastiaan van Diemen)
- Jon Karthaus (Moes Brinksma)
- Patrick Martens (Mike Bosboom)
- Monique van der Werff (Taffie Arends)
- Sander Jan Klerk (Aaron Zomerkamp)
- Sylvana Simons (Safira)
- Gys de Villiers (Cornelis de Groot)
- Sabine Koning (Gaby Komproe)
- Raymi Sambo (Bowey Berenger)
- Ernst Löw (Siegfried Schilt)
- Pieternel Pouwels (Maxime Schilt)
- Kim Boekhoorn (Filo Schilt)

== Awards ==
The film received a Golden Film and a "Nickelodeon Kid's Choice Award".

== See also ==
- List of Dutch films of 2005
