= Hanna Verboom =

Dutch actress (born 1983)

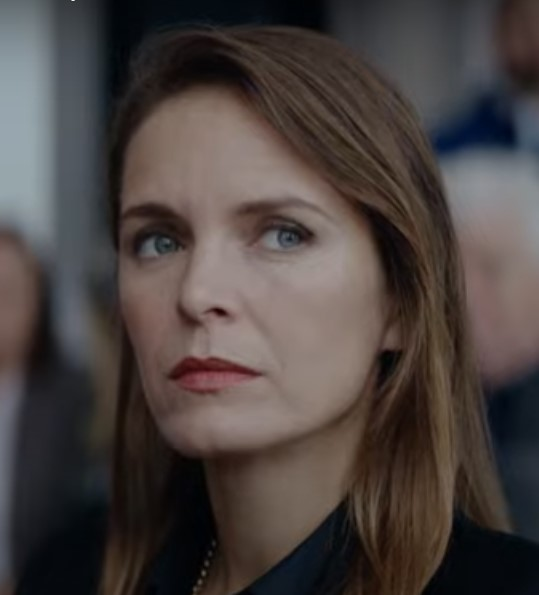
- Born: 11 May 1983 (age 42); Vilvoorde, Belgium
- Occupation: Actress

Hanna Verboom (born 11 May 1983) is a Dutch actress.

== Career ==
Born in Vilvoorde, Belgium, she spent her early childhood in the African nations of Kenya, Uganda and Sudan. After moving to the Netherlands, Verboom worked as a model and won the "Dutch Elite Model Look 2003". She also majored in economics and philosophy, and minored in film science at the Amsterdam University, where she joined the Amsterdam student theater group and convincingly showed her talent for acting in several plays with the production company.

Verboom is also a painter and had her first work exhibited in the Amsterdam gallery in 2004. She made her motion picture debut in 2004 playing the female lead in the film Snowfever. She hosted the Dutch National TV channel BNN's weekly music show Top of the Pops.

Outside of the Netherlands she is perhaps best known for her role appearing alongside Rob Schneider in the 2005 sequel Deuce Bigalow: European Gigolo. Verboom played Eva Voorsboch. She was one of the contestants in the celebrity version of Peking Express.

== Filmography ==
- Feuten: Het Feestje (2013)
- Me and Mr Jones on Natalee Island (2011)
- Surviving Sunday's (2007)
- Deuce Bigalow: European Gigolo (2005)
- Snowfever (2004)
- Top of the Pops NL (2000) TV series (2004–2006)
- Elixir - The Pain Killers NL (2025)
