= Junior Dance 2012 =

Dutch television series

Junior Dance is a program in the Netherlands. The hosts of this program are Ewout Genemans & Kim-Lian van der Meij who have presented the Junior Eurovision Song Contest 2012 in Amsterdam.

== Junior Dance 2012 finalists ==
- Leslie
- Sharonne & Shania
- Susy, Jamie & Juliet
- Nori, Sharon & Chloe
- Elise
- Sander & Jennifer
- Joey & Pernila
- Valery

== Junior Dance 2013 finalists ==
- Julide & Defne
- Jemuel
- Elianne
- Robin & Joelle
- Robin, Remen & Matthew
- Robbin
- Kyra & Trijntje
- Charlie-Ann
- Gina
- Mon
- Johanneke
- Esmee & Nadine
