= Netherlands Association of Film Distributors =

Association for film distributors in the Netherlands

Netherlands Association of Film Distributors (Dutch: Nederlandse Vereniging van Filmdistributeurs) is an association for film distributors in the Netherlands, based in Amsterdam. Thirty six film distributors in the Netherlands are member organizations. Weekly, the association publishes information about new film releases and box office results in the Netherlands. The box office awards Crystal Film, Golden Film, and Platinum Film are based on this information.
