= Dennis Bots =

Zambian-Dutch film director

- Born: 11 June 1974 (age 52); Kitwe, Zambia
- Education: Macropedius College
- Occupation: Film director
- Years active: 2005–present

Dennis Bots (born 11 June 1974) is a Zambian-Dutch film director.

== Biography ==
Dennis Bots was born in the Zambian city of Kitwe in 1974. His Dutch parents lived in Zambia, where his father was employed. As an infant, he moved to the Dutch town of Gemert. Bots's father was an avid amateur filmmaker, and Bots made his first film, Shetani, at the age of 12, about an African statue that was bought in the Wereldwinkel and contained a spirit. Bots cites as influences films from his childhood, such as Stand By Me, E.T. the Extra-Terrestrial and The Neverending Story. He attended Macropedius College and worked for the local broadcaster for several years. At the age of 18, Bots moved to Amsterdam to study film.

In 1996, Bots graduated from the Dutch Film and Television Academy in Amsterdam. He began his career working in television, directing episodes of TV series Goudkust, Rozengeur & Wodka Lime, Goede tijden, Slechte tijden and Trauma 24/7. In 2005, Bots directed his first feature film, Zoop in Africa. He has largely focused on children's films since his debut. Bots directed Anubis en het Pad der 7 Zonden, which became the most viewed film of 2008 in the Netherlands. He directed Achtste Groepers Huilen Niet in 2012, adapting a book which he had considered working on since 1999. The story is about a twelve-year-old who develops leukemia.

In 2014, he directed Oorlogsgeheimen ("Secrets of War") which premiered at the Luxembourg City Film Festival in 2015. Bots also worked on the TV series Celblok H (2014) and Project Orpheus (2016). In 2017, he directed Storm: Letters van Vuur, which takes place during the Protestant Reformation. It tells the story of Storm, a boy whose father was arrested for printing a letter by Martin Luther. Bots directed Circus Noel in 2019, about a girl who joins a circus. It was written by Karen van Holst Pellekaan, whom Bots had collaborated with on previous films. In 2020, Bots directed Engel, based on the novel by Isa Hoes. The film was written by Ellen Barendregt and tells the story of a girl who can make wishes come true for good people. Bots lives in Bussum.

He also directed the 2022 family film Het Feest van Tante Rita.

== Filmography ==
- 2005: Zoop in Africa
- 2007: Plop en de Pinguïn
- 2008: Anubis en het Pad der 7 Zonden
- 2009: Anubis en de wraak van Arghus
- 2012: Achtste Groepers Huilen Niet
- 2014: Secrets of War
- 2015: Code M
- 2017: Storm: Letters van Vuur
- 2019: Vals
- 2019: Circus Noël
- 2020: Engel
- 2020: K3: Dans Van De Farao
- 2022: Het Feest van Tante Rita
