= Love to Love =

Love to Love may refer to:

- Love to Love (film), a 2003 Dutch film
- Love to Love (TV program), a 2000s Filipino show
- "Love to Love", a song by Neil Diamond from The Feel of Neil Diamond (1966)
  - "Love to Love", a Neil Diamond song later recorded by The Monkees, appearing on Good Times! (2016)
- "Love to Love", a song by UFO from Lights Out (1977)

== See also ==
- "I Love to Love", a 1995 song by La Bouche
- "I Love to Love (But My Baby Loves to Dance)", a 1977 song by Tina Charles
