= Lepel (film) =

2005 Dutch-language family adventure film

- Theatrical release poster
- Directed by: Willem van de Sande Bakhuyzen
- Screenplay by: Mieke de Jong
- Produced by: Leontine Petit; Joost de Vries
- Starring: Loes Luca; Carice van Houten; Barry Atsma
- Cinematography: Guido van Gennep
- Edited by: Wouter Jansen
- Music by: Robert Lockhart
- Production companies: Lemming Film; Egoli Tossell Film; Zephyr Films; NPS
- Distributed by: Warner Bros. Pictures
- Release date: 2 February 2005
- Running time: 96 minutes
- Countries: Netherlands; Germany; United Kingdom
- Language: Dutch
- Box office: $1.5 million

Lepel is a 2005 Dutch-language family adventure film directed by Willem van de Sande Bakhuyzen. Filming took place in Germany, with scenes shot in Gera.

The film was released in the Netherlands on 2 February 2005 by Warner Bros. Pictures. It received positive reviews and won a Golden Film award for 100,000 visitors.

== Cast ==
- Joep Truijen as Lepel/Pelle
- Neeltje de Vree as Pleun
- Loes Luca as Oma Koppenol
- Carice van Houten as Juffrouw Broer
- Barry Atsma as Max
- Kees Hulst as Meester Bijts
- Reinout Bussemaker as Lepel's father
- Lieke-Rosa Altink as Lepel's mother
- Peter Van Den Begin as Ballonvaarder

== Release ==
=== Home media ===
The film was released on DVD by Warner Home Video on 31 August 2005.

=== Accolades ===
Accolades received by Winky's Horse
Year	Award	Category	Recipient(s)	Result	Ref.
2005	Netherlands Film Festival	Golden Calf for Best Production Design	Team Production Design Lepel	Won	

== See also ==
- List of Dutch films of 2005
