= Patrick Martens =

Dutch actor and presenter (born 1978)

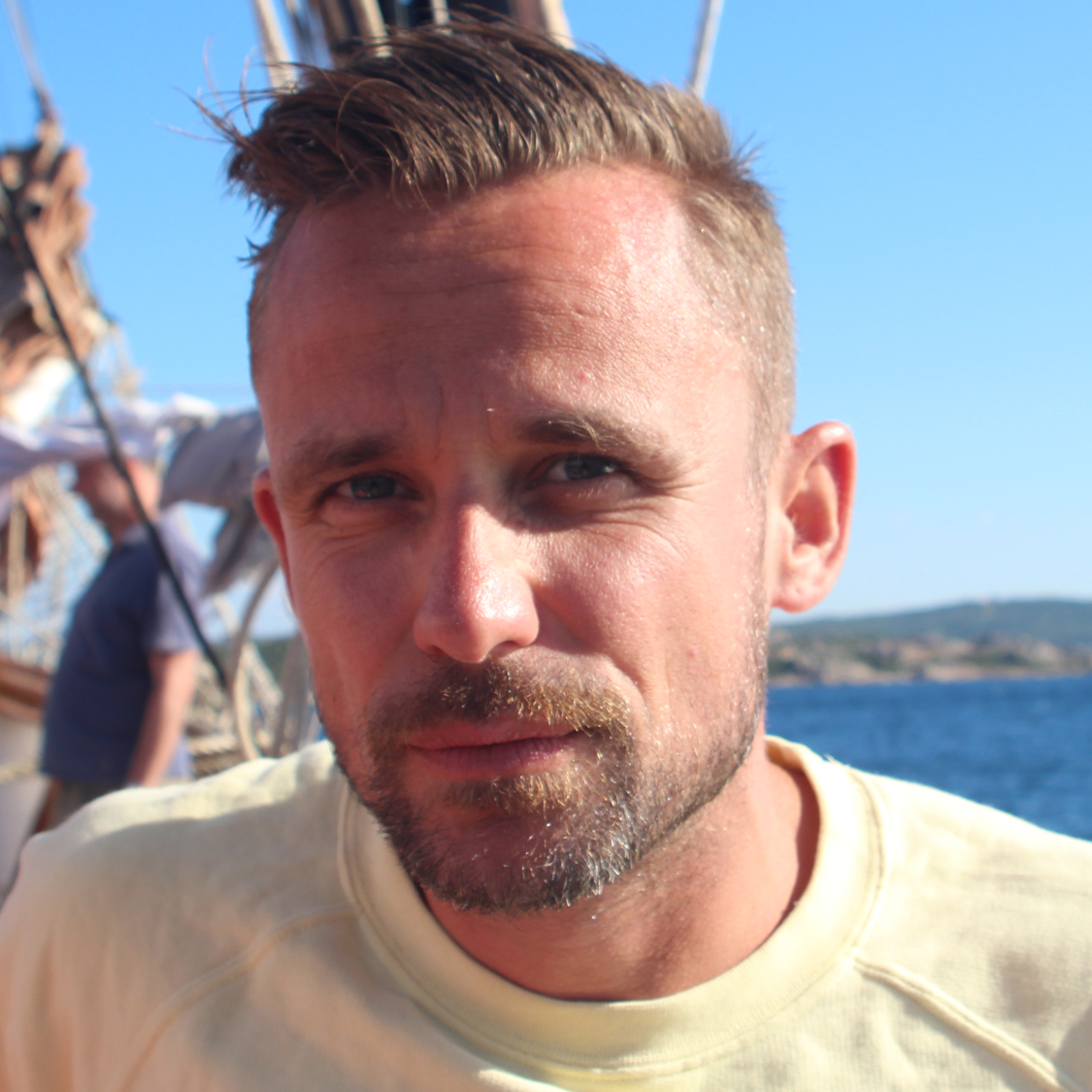
- Born: 4 April 1978 (age 48); Breda, Netherlands
- Occupations: Actor; Television presenter

Patrick Martens (born 4 April 1978) is a Dutch actor and television presenter. He is known for his role of Mike Bosboom in the youth soap opera Zoop. He also played the role of Morris Fischer in the soap opera Goede tijden, slechte tijden.

== Career ==
Martens played the role of Mike Bosboom in the youth soap opera Zoop. The first season of the show aired in 2004. He also played this role in the films Zoop in Africa (2005), Zoop in India (2006) and Zoop in South America (2007). Martens began working for Nickelodeon in 2006 and he presented multiple children's shows, including Under The Ground, Supernick and Nick Battle. He worked for Nickelodeon for seven years.

In 2008, Martens participated in the 8th season of the popular television show Wie is de Mol?. In 2020, he appeared in a special anniversary edition of a show, called Wie is de Mol? Renaissance, which featured only contestants of previous seasons.

Martens appeared in two episodes of the game show De Jongens tegen de Meisjes (2012 and 2015). He played a role in the 2013 film App directed by Bobby Boermans. In 2014, he appeared in the film Gooische Vrouwen 2 directed by Will Koopman. Martens and Tanja Jess presented the talk show RTL Breakfast Club in 2015.

In 2019, Martens became a co-host of the show 5 Uur Live. He presented the show together with Daphne Bunskoek, Jamie Trenité and Caroline Tensen. The show ended in 2020. He was also a co-presenter of the show Koffietijd. The last episode of Koffietijd aired in May 2023.

In 2021, he appeared in the photography game show Het Perfecte Plaatje in which contestants compete to create the best photo in various challenges. He finished in first place. He was also a contestant in a 2021 episode of the game show Oh, wat een jaar!.

Martens and Georgina Verbaan presented the television show Date Smakelijk in 2023. He was a contestant in a 2024 episode of the quiz show Waku Waku.

== Selected filmography ==
=== As actor (television) ===
- Zoop
- Goede tijden, slechte tijden

=== As actor (film) ===
- 2005: Zoop in Africa
- 2006: Zoop in India
- 2007: Zoop in South America
- 2013: App
- 2014: Gooische Vrouwen 2

=== As contestant ===
- 2008: Wie is de Mol?
- 2012: De Jongens tegen de Meisjes
- 2015: De Jongens tegen de Meisjes
- 2019: Britt's Beestenbende
- 2020: Wie is de Mol? Renaissance (anniversary season)
- 2021: Het Perfecte Plaatje
- 2021: Oh, wat een jaar!
- 2023: Beat the Champions VIPS
- 2024: Waku Waku
- 2026: The House of Hide and Seek

=== As presenter ===
- Koffietijd
- 2015: RTL Breakfast Club
- 2019–2020: 5 Uur Live
- 2023: Lettrix
- 2023: Date Smakelijk
