= Gruesome School Trip =

2005 Dutch film by Pieter Kuijpers

- Theatrical release poster
- Directed by: Pieter Kuijpers
- Screenplay by: Burny Bos; Pieter Kuijpers
- Story by: Paul van Loon
- Based on: De Griezelbus by Paul van Loon
- Produced by: Burny Bos; Michiel de Rooij; Sabine Veenendaal
- Starring: Serge Price; Jim van der Panne; Lisa Smit; Willem Nijholt; Angela Schijf; Romijn Conen; Tom Jansen; Theu Boermans; Sylvia Poorta
- Cinematography: Bert Pot
- Edited by: J.P. Luijsterburg
- Music by: Het Paleis van Boem
- Production companies: Bos Bros. Film-TV Productions; AVRO
- Distributed by: Warner Bros. Pictures
- Release dates: 29 November 2005 (Ede); 7 December 2005 (Netherlands)
- Running time: 96 minutes
- Country: Netherlands
- Language: Dutch
- Box office: $1.8 million

Gruesome School Trip (Dutch: De Griezelbus, lit. "The Horror Bus") is a 2005 Dutch horror family film written and directed by Pieter Kuijpers and co-written and produced by Burny Bos, based on the Dutch novel series De Griezelbus by Paul van Loon.

The film was released by Warner Bros. Pictures on 7 December 2005 in the Netherlands and it received a Golden Film award for having been viewed by over 100,000 people. It received mixed reviews and grossed over $1 million at the box office. The film was re-edited into a four-episode miniseries for television by AVRO in 2007.

== Plot ==
Onnoval is an awkward 11-year-old who feels uncomfortable around his classmates. He believes that if he loses self-control by becoming too excited or getting into a fight, he will turn into a werewolf. Onnoval keeps his worry a secret, even from his school sweetheart, Liselore.

After a particularly humiliating incident at school where the bully Gino grabs his love poem to Liselore and tears it to pieces, Onnoval writes a horror story where he takes revenge on his classmates.

The story is a way for Onnoval to cope with his humiliation at school. However, fantasy soon turns to frightening reality when Ferluci takes possession of Onnoval's story and makes a deal with the devil to make it come true.

If Onnoval does not rewrite the story immediately, the planned school trip to the Horror Park will end in disaster. But in order to rewrite it, he must first get his story back from Ferluci.

== Cast ==
- Serge Price as Onnoval
- Lisa Smit as Liselore
- Jim van der Panne as Gino
- Tom Jansen as Nol van Paulo
- Romijn Conen as Meester de Vriend
- Fred Goessens as Ferluci
- Edo Brunner as Chauffeur Beentjes
- Willem Nijholt as The Tour Leader/Count Vlapano
- Angela Schijf as Sister Ursala
- Theu Boermans as Sok
- Sylvia Poorta as Gerda
- Paul van Loon as himself

== Release ==
=== Home media ===
The film was released on DVD by Warner Home Video on 17 May 2006. It later received a second DVD release on 22 November 2011 by Video/Film Express.

== See also ==
- List of Dutch films of 2005
