= Nickelodeon Netherlands Kids' Choice Awards =

The Nickelodeon Netherlands Kids' Choice Awards in the Netherlands were broadcast on Nickelodeon in the Netherlands and the Flanders region of Belgium in 2004, 2005, 2007 and 2008.

== Winners ==
=== 2007 ===
Category	Winner	Nominees
Best pop group	Ch!pz	Kus, Pussycat Dolls, Nick & Simon
Best singer	EliZe	Hilary Duff, Marco Borsato, Jan Smit
Best athlete	Klaas-Jan Huntelaar	Ireen Wüst, Sven Kramer, Kim Clijsters
Best book	Hoe overleef ik (zonder) liefde? (nl:Francine Oomen)	Het Huis Anubis, 100% Timboektoe, 100% Lola
Best cartoon	Bratz	SpongeBob SquarePants, Beugelbekkie, Avatar
Best TV programme	Het Huis Anubis	GTST, Lizzie McGuire, Onderweg naar Morgen
Best TV star	nl:Loek Beernink	Viviënne van den Assem, Nicolette van Dam, Wendy van Dijk
Best film	Afblijven	Zoop in India, Step Up, Pirates of the Caribbean: Dead Man's Chest
Best game	The Sims 2: Pets	FIFA 07, Zoo Tycoon 2: Marine Mania, New Super Mario Bros.
Best charity	Stichting de Opkikker	War Child, WNF, KiKa
