= Sander Jan Klerk =

Dutch actor and singer (born 1982)

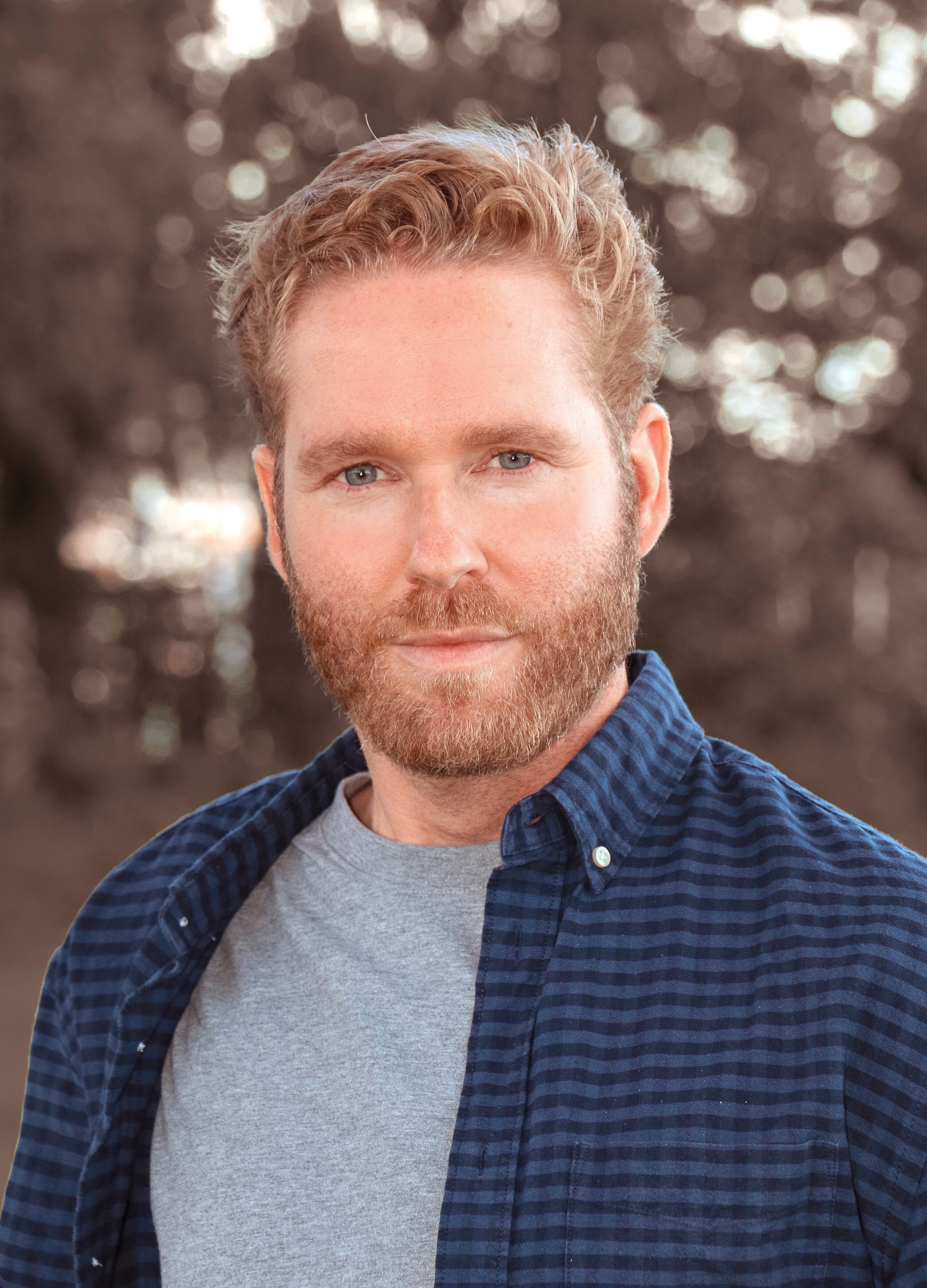
- Klerk in 2020
- Born: June 19, 1982 (age 43); The Hague, Netherlands
- Occupations: Actor, singer
- Years active: 2000 ─ Present

Sander Jan Klerk (born 19 June 1982) is a Dutch actor and singer.

== Biography ==
Klerk was born on 19 June 1982, in The Hague, the youngest son from a family with 2 children. He was born in The Hague and grew up in the Westland (municipality), Netherlands. He studied at the Actorsstudio, Theatreschool Rabarber and the Dutch Musical Ensemble in the Netherlands and the UK.

He began his acting career as a teenager, appearing in various TV series including Baantjer and Onderweg naar Morgen. Klerk played a recurring role in 4 episodes of Het Glazen Huis dramaseries from Endemol.

Klerk starred in the Nickelodeon (TV channel) television series Zoop (TV series) in the role of Aaron Zomerkamp. He reprised this role in the feature film "Zoop in Africa". This TV series and film have won multiple awards, including the "Nickelodeon Kid's Choice Award" and the "Golden film".

His theatre roles include Grease - (Doody), Jekyll & Hyde - (Simon Stride), and Tita Tovenaar (Tom de Tuinman).

Klerk performed in the John Kraaijkamp Musical Awards Gala's, Musicals in Ahoy' the All Star Musical Gala, and Musical Sing-Along at Amsterdam Uitmarkt.

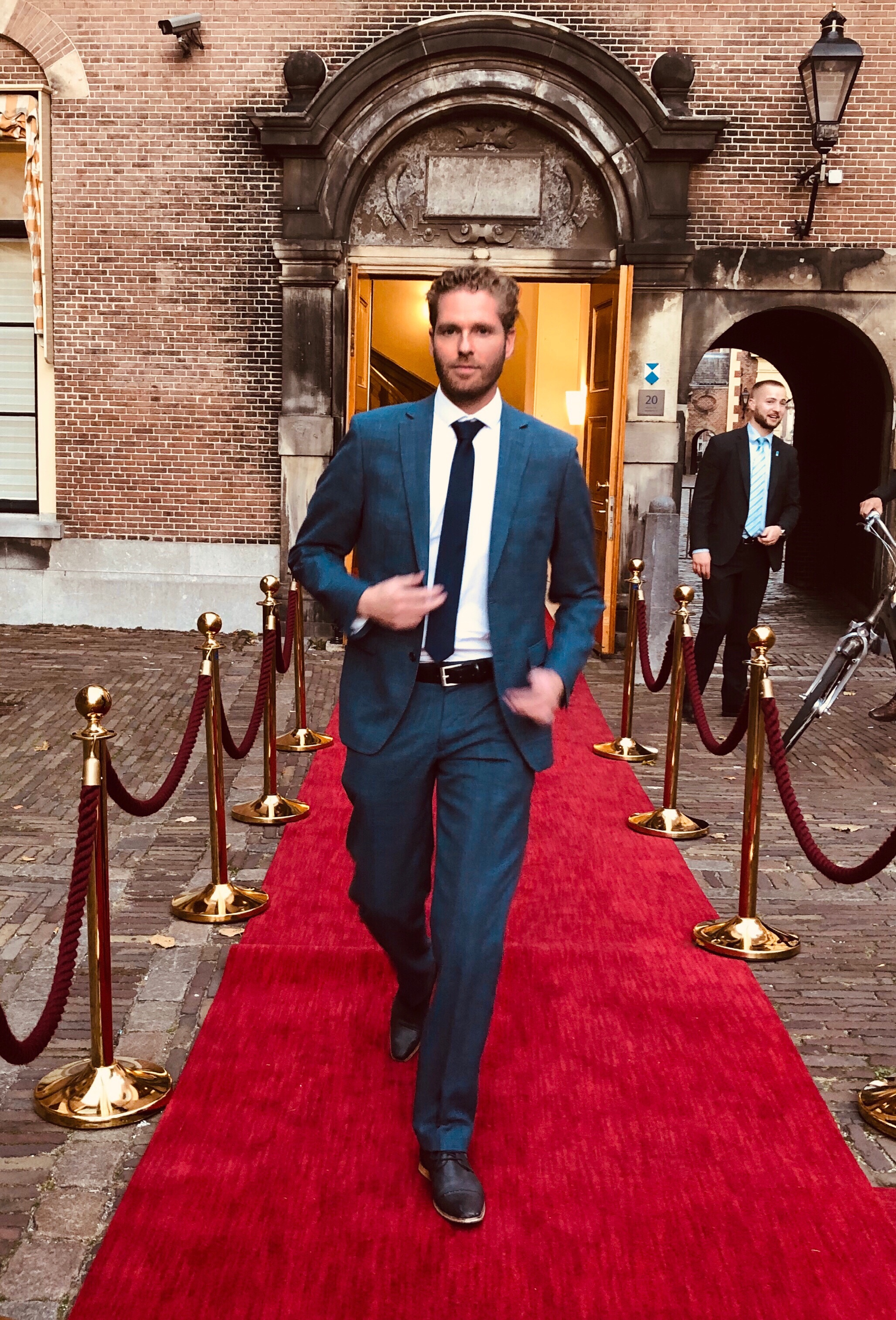
Klerk at event Binnenhof The Hague in 2018

From 2008 to 2012, Klerk was seen in various international commercials for brands as McDonald's, Domino's Pizza, and Starbucks.

In 2009, Klerk performed with Lea Salonga in concert in New York. In 2012, Klerk performed in Musical Classics in Ahoy in Ahoy Rotterdam. Later that year Klerk was a backup artist for Mika at his European tour "The Origin of Love".

Klerk played in the NET 5 TV series "Achter Gesloten Deuren" (Behind Closed Doors) in the role of Thomas Henegouwen, broadcast in fall 2012. In 2015 he appeared in the RTL-series Goede tijden, slechte tijden as Bas Luster.

Following roles in dramaseries as ‘’Moordvrouw (2016) and Suspects (TV series)’’ (2018) Klerk played the role of "Hermann of Thuringia" in the international tv dramaseries "Glow & Darkness" in 2021.

== Selected filmography ==
=== Television ===
Year	Title	Role	Notes
2002	Baantjer	Gevangene	Episode: "De Cock en de moord om het woord"
2003	Onderweg Naar Morgen	Doctor	1 Episode
2003	Meiden van de Wit	Daniel de Ridder	Episode: "Het Jubileum"
2004	Het Glazen Huis	Acteur "Zilver & Goud"	4 Episodes
2005-2006	Zoop (TV)	Aaron Zomerkamp	129 Episodes
2012	Achter Gesloten Deuren	Thomas Henegouwen	Episode: "Vakantieliefde"
2014	Danni Lowinski	Erik Koerier	Episode: "Het Moederskindje", Episode: "Monster"
2015	Goede tijden, slechte tijden	Bas Luster	4 Episodes
2016	Moordvrouw	Pieter Broekman	Episode: "Duivels Genoegen"
2018	Suspects (TV series)	Advocaat Kathelijne	Episode: "Missie Mali"
2021	Glow & Darkness	Hermann of Thuringia	Season 1

=== Film ===
Year	Film	Role	Notes
2005	Zoop in Africa	Aaron Zomerkamp	
