= Ewout Genemans =

Dutch actor, singer, presenter, and television producer

- Born: 7 February 1985 (age 41); The Hague, Netherlands
- Occupations: Television producer, presenter, actor, singer
- Years active: 2004–present
- Website: https://ewoutgenemans.nl/

Ewout Genemans (born 7 february 1985 in The Hague) is a Dutch tv producer, presenter, moderator and keynote speaker. He is well-known for presenting various tv programmes at RTL and produces popular shows with his production company No Pictures Please.

== Biography ==
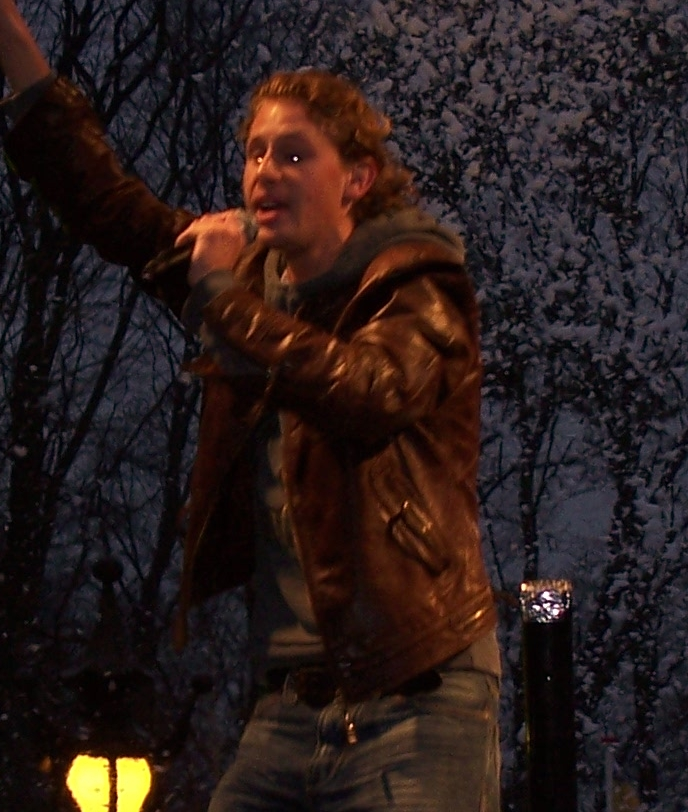
Genemans performing in 2007

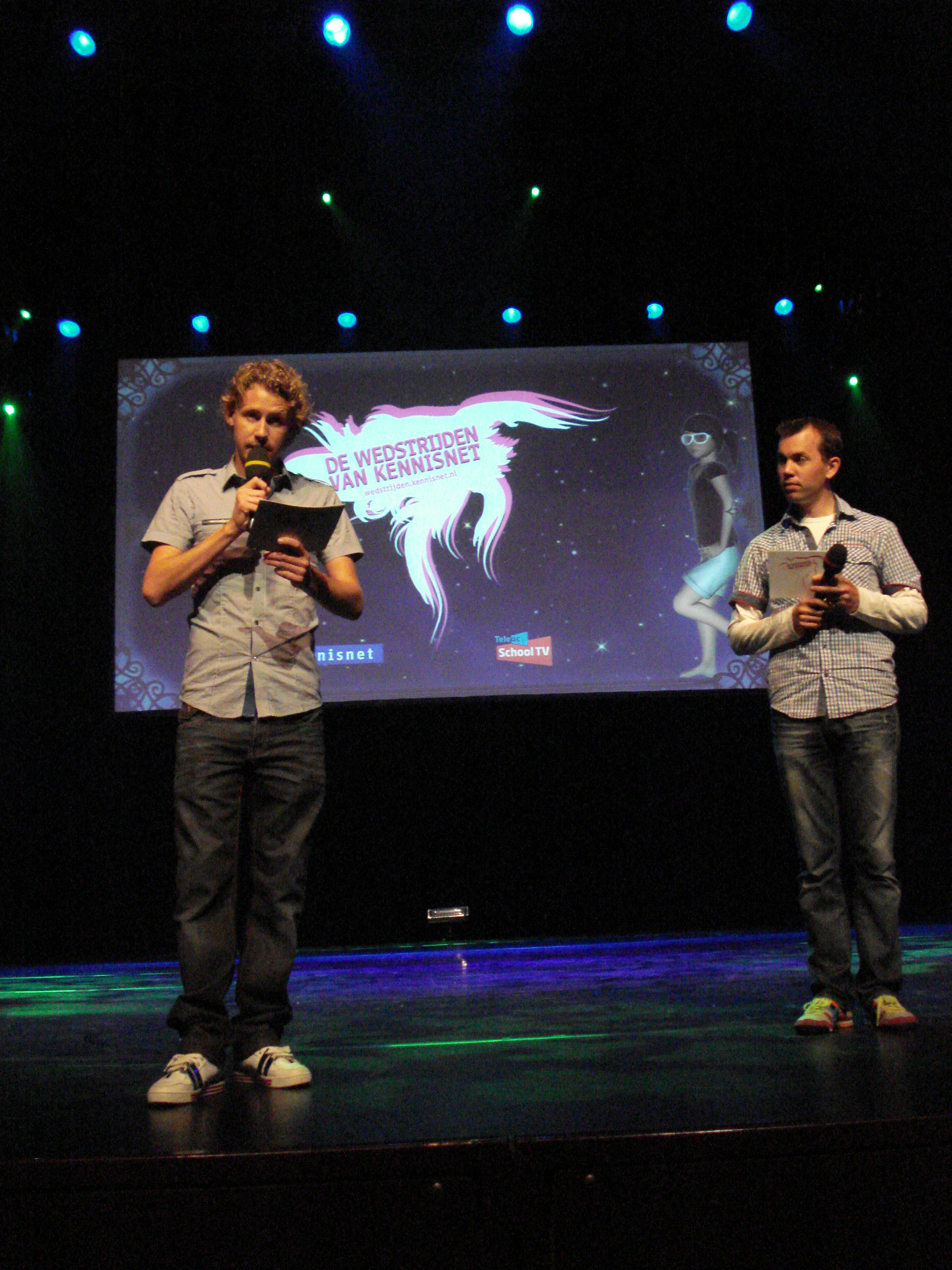
Genemans presenting on stage with Jurre Bosman in 2010

Genemans attended the St.-Maartenscollege in Voorburg and joined the Rabarber Youth theatre school in The Hague afterwards. After obtaining his havo-diploma, he studied at the School of Journalism in Utrecht for six months. He worked as an editorial assistant at Visible TV next to his studies and got to be part of the RTL4 show ‘Vliegende Hollanders’ in this way. He worked on the production of the tv show ‘Meiden van De Wit’ in 2003. Genemans was an actor in the teen show ZOOP on Nickelodeon and the corresponding films Zoop in Afrika, Zoop in India and Zoop in Zuid-Amerika. After singing the songs ‘Laat me leven’ and ‘Verliefd’ on the show, Ewout got requested to sing at festivals as well.

Genemans worked at castingbureau Kemna Casting for a year after his work for ZOOP. He presented the show ‘Willem Wever’ for NCRV in 2007 and participated in ‘Dancing on Ice’. He became the permanent replacement for Pepijn Gunneweg at the ‘BZT Show’ and presented the tv show ‘Sudokidz’ in 2008 as well.

Ewout did the voice over for Remy, the main character in Disney/Pixar’s animated movie Ratatouille. He also became a popular voice for commercials such as ‘Veilig Verkeer Nederland’ and ‘Postbank’.

Genemans additionally founded the production company ‘No Pictures Please' together with Jon Karthaus. They worked side by side until 2011, when Karthaus decided to focus on his career as a singer-songwriter. They came up with the concept for the tv show ‘Fans!’ that was broadcast on SBS6. From 2010 onwards, Genemans became the presenter of the Junior Songfestival (for AVRO) that had previously been presented by Sipke Jan Bousema. He also became the presenter of ‘Wie wordt Kruimeltje?’ and AvaStars starting from May that year.

Ewout played the role of Davis for the ‘Hart onder de riem’ episode of S1NGLE on 30 March in 2010. He debuted as a presenter on the national broadcaster ‘Nederland 1’ for the AVRO-show ‘Onder Wibi’s Vleugels’. He covered the ‘Gouden Televizier-Ring Gala’ at the ‘Voetbal International’ studio for AVRO as well. He signed an exclusive contract with AVRO on 1 December 2011. He organised the AVRO international finale of the Junior Eurovisiesongfestival 2012 and presented it together with Kim-Lian van der Meij. On 14 April 2012, he participated in the newest season of the SBS6-show ‘Fans!’. He also participated in the thirteenth season of ‘Wie is de Mol?’, but had to leave after the first episode. 2013 was the year in which he presented the Junior Songfestival for the last time.

Between 2012 and 2016, Genemans mainly produced shows for RTL 5 such as ‘Ik heb HET nog nooit gedaan’, ‘From Russia with Love’ or ‘Voetbalfans’ for RTL 7. He also presented the show ‘5 Extreem’ for RTL 5. He did a comeback of ‘Fans!’ in 2015 called ‘Superfans: Mijn idool is mijn leven.’ Starting from 1 October 2015, ‘No Pictures Please’ became part of FremantleMedia. Ewout stepped down as a Managing Director in 2020 and took on the role as a Creative Lead at FremantleMedia.

Genemans has been a presenter and tv producer at RTL Nederland since 2017. He presented various shows for both RTL 4 and RTL 5. Ewout presented ‘Verslaafd’ since 2019 and permanently replaced Peter van der Vorst as a presenter for the show in 2021.

Ewout released a documentary on 27 December in 2021 called ‘Staand verder leven: na de moord op Peter R. de Vries’ after the murder of crime reporter Peter R. de Vries that was broadcast on RTL 4.

== TV Producer ==
- 2008–2009 – several items Nickelodeon and MTV
- 2009 – various promos Nederland 3/Z@PP
- 2009–2010 – Fans! SBS6
- 2010 – Heibel langs de lijn KRO
- 2011 – Voetbalfans RTL 7
- 2011 – De Gilfactor EO
- 2013 – Echte Penoze RTL 4
- 2014 – From Russia with Love RTL 5

== Presenter & Actor ==
- 2003 – Vrienden zonder grenzen Teleac/NOT (actor)
- 2004–2007 – Zoop (TV) Nickelodeon (actor)
- 2007–present – Willem Wever NCRV (presenter)
- 2007–2008 – Sudokidz NCRV (presenter)
- 2007–present – BZT-Show NCRV (presenter)
- 2009 – Museumbende AVRO (presenter)
- 2009–present – Kinderprinsengrachtconcert AVRO (presenter)
- 2009–present – AvaStars LIVE AVRO (presenter)
- 2010 – S1NGLE NET 5 (guest)
- 2010 – Wie wordt Kruimeltje? AVRO (presenter)
- 2010–2013 – Junior Songfestival AVRO (presenter)
- 2010 – Junior Sintfestival AVRO (presenter)
- 2011 – Zapp live NCRV/Nederland 3 (presenter)
- 2011 – Amsterdam Gay Pride AVRO/Nederland 3 (presenter)
- 2011 – Onder Wibi's Vleugels AVRO/Nederland 1 (presenter)
- 2011 – Gouden televizierringgala AVRO/Nederland 1
- 2012-2013 – AVRO Junior Dance AVRO/Nederland 3 (presenter together with Kim-Lian)
- 2014 – 5 Extreem RTL 5 (presenter)
- 2017 – Beruchte gevangenissen: Ewout in de cel RTL 5 (presenter)

== Filmography ==
=== Film ===
- 2005 – Zoop in Africa
- 2006 – Zoop in India
- 2007 – Zoop in South America
- 2007 Ratatouille (film) - Remy
- 2007 Je vriend de rat - Remy
- 2008 Chasseurs de dragons (film) - Hector

=== Television ===
- 2005 Gemma Glitter (Winnaar Roltrap Rentest) – AVRO
- 2007 Sterren Dansen op het IJs – SBS6
- 2009 Te leuk om waar te zijn – TROS
- 2009 Hole in the wall – SBS6
- 2009 Let's Dance – RTL 4
- 2009 Uri Geller (Finale) – SBS6
- 2010 De leukste jaren – KRO
- 2010 Life 4 you – RTL 4
- 2011 Koffietijd – RTL 4
- 2011 De Wereld Draait Door – VARA
- 2012 Z@PP Your Planet – Z@pp
- 2012 Ik kom bij je eten – RTL 4
- 2013 Wie is de Mol? – afvaller 1 - AVRO
- 2017 Beruchte gevangenissen – RTL 5

== Discography ==
- "Verliefd"
- "Ooh Ooh het voelt zo goed"
- "Laat me leven"
- "Djeo Ma Djula" (Zoop in Africa)
- "India you're like magic to me" (Zoop in India)
- "Baila Mi Tango" (Zoop in South America)
