= Anubis en het Pad der 7 Zonden =

2008 Belgian/Dutch film

Anubis en het pad der 7 zonden
- Theatrical release poster
- Directed by: Dennis Bots
- Written by: Alexandra Penrhyn Lowe; Anjali Taneja
- Starring: Achmed Akkabi; Vincent Banic; Loek Beernink; Filip Bolluyt
- Edited by: Jan Goossen
- Music by: Olaf Janssens
- Distributed by: Independent Films
- Release date: 8 October 2008 (Netherlands)
- Countries: Belgium; Netherlands
- Language: Dutch

Anubis en het Pad der 7 Zonden (lit. 'Anubis and the Path of 7 Sins') is a Belgian-Dutch film version of the children's television show Het Huis Anubis. It is directed by Dennis Bots, with a screenplay by Alexandra Penrhyn and Anjali Taneja, and a music score by Olaf Janssens. Starring Achmed Akkabi, Vincent Banic, Loek Beernink and Filip Bolluyt, it was first released on 8 October 2008 in the Netherlands and was the most financially successful Dutch film of 2008.

== Plot ==
A bus carrying the residents from the House of Anubis go to Croatia for a school trip. The group consists of Amber, Nienke, her boyfriend Fabian, prankster Appie, Patricia, her best friend Joyce and her boyfriend Mick, the adolescent Jeroen and his girlfriend Noa. The house's landlord Victor and teacher Van Swieten also come along. The bus driver sees a woman in the distance who disappears soon after the bus hits her. With flat tires, they are forced to camp out for the night. Nienke sees the woman too before a small key appears in Fabian's pocket. In an abandoned village, they see a statue of count Rohan De Beaufort holding a box with his foot.

Jeroen becomes suspicious of Fabian studying the purpose of the mysterious key and he, Nienke and Fabian believe that it belongs to the keyhole sticking out of the box from the statue. Nienke & Fabian both plan to stick the key in to the box at midnight. Jeroen steals the key and he and Appie do it instead, resulting in them taking the real box from the sculpture, which collapses in the process. Nienke then arrives before the real count Rohan appears before he kidnaps her.

The next day, they discover Nienke's disappearance and enter a dimension set in a medieval time zone where the woman informs the group that Rohan kidnapped her because he wants to petrify his own heart, and that he needs seven girls to do so, with Nienke being the last. They must follow the path of the seven deadly sins in order to get to the castle where she is, and if they don't make it before sunset, Nienke will be petrified. She also warns them that if they make a mistake, they will meet the same fate. They encounter a large group of spears (which Apple describes as a super hype mega Mikado) with a key in the center, which Fabian successfully grabs.

Later, they approach a garden of nymphs. Noa sees one of them seducing Jeroen and pushes them away before being turned into a stone statue. Back at the castle, Nienke finds out that the woman, Charlotte, that she and Rohan were not allowed to marry, telling him she married a different person, betraying him, so he started his plan and creating the path to prevent their true love from reaching the victim.

The rest approach a cave, and Fabian uses the key from the spears to open the gate, where they see a giant wheel. They see symbols made from magical stones and must spin it in order to let the same symbol face the exit. It must be done as fast as possible, or else the cave will collapse. When the door slowly opens, Patricia escapes with the box who was given a task by Rohan to return it to him after running away from Joyce and Mick. Giant rocks begin to fall petrifying both Mick and Joyce. Amber discovers that Patricia was lured into a trap seeing her freezing solid before she is petrified herself. She steals the chest and reunites with the rest before going to a swamp, much to her disgust. Appie hears a noise and sees a crocodile-like creature approaching them before she and Amber falls into the swamp; both are rescued.

They soon reach the castle where Rohan appears chasing Jeroen and petrifying him. In the castle, they encounter fashionable clothes and food. Appie takes a jam cookie and Amber a necklace, both becoming statues like the rest. Fabian breaks down the door not long before Rohan enters and attacking Fabian again, who isn't allowed to fight back, or he will be instantly petrified with all hope being gone. The only thing Fabian has to do is to defend himself. Nienke grabs and opens the box containing two hearts, the other belonging to Charlotte. Charlotte tells Rohan she did love him all this time and kiss while Fabian and Nienke embrace. Back in the village, Fabian, Nienke, and all of the remaining students wake up in front of the reconstructed statue. Victor and Van Swieten finds them and they leave, while the camera zooms in on to the sealed keyhole while a heartbeat can be heard.

== Cast ==
- Loek Beernink as Nienke Martens
- Iris Hesseling as Amber Rosenbergh
- Lucien van Geffen as Fabian Ruitenburg
- Vincent Banic as Mick Zeelenberg
- Vreneli van Helbergen as Patricia Soeters
- Marieke Westernenk as Joyce van Bodegraven
- Achmed Akkabi as Appie Tahibi
- Sven de Wijn as Jeroen Cornelissen
- Gamze Tazim as Noa van Rijn
- Walter Crommelin as Victor Emmanuel Rodenmaar
- Ton Feil as Ari van Swieten
- Egbert Jan Weeber as Rohan de Beaufort
- Maryam Hassouni as Charlotte de Beaufort
