= Love to Love You Baby =

Love to Love You Baby may refer to:

- Love to Love You Baby (album), the second studio album by Donna Summer
- "Love to Love You Baby" (song), a 1975 Donna Summer song from the album of the same name
