= Zoop in South America =

2007 film directed by Johan Nijenhuis

- Directed by: Johan Nijenhuis
- Screenplay by: Johan Nijenhuis; Wijo Koek
- Produced by: Johan Nijenhuis; Alain de Levita
- Cinematography: Willem Helwig
- Edited by: Sándor Soeteman
- Music by: Martijn Schimmer; Mario Zapata
- Production companies: Nijenhuis & de Levita Film & TV
- Distributed by: Independent Films
- Release date: 19 July 2007
- Running time: 90 minutes
- Country: Netherlands
- Language: Dutch

Zoop in South America (Dutch: Zoop in Zuid-Amerika) is a 2007 Dutch youth film directed by Johan Nijenhuis. The film received a Golden Film for 100,000 visitors.

== Plot ==
The rangers from Ouwehands Dierenpark are asked to save the extremely rare De Loro butterfly population before the butterflies emerge from their cocoons and perish in the massive wildfires raging through the South American jungle. To do so, the rangers travel to South America, where they soon split into two groups. One group tries to track down the butterfly species using a map fragment. The other group hopes to complete this map by tracking down the expedition members who once discovered this rare butterfly species.

To do so, the rangers brave wild animals, runaway cows on the Argentine pampas, participate in a tango competition, speedboat race, and climb an impassable rock face to find the butterflies. Meanwhile, Moes befriends Cherpee, a jealous monkey who gives Taffie a hard time. Mike is annoyed by the stubborn Bastiaan, who has decided to film his South American adventure for his fans. Elise doesn’t go to South America with the other rangers in this film; she only occasionally sends the rangers messages from the Netherlands. Alwin and Sira experience one of the most exciting adventures.

== Cast ==
- Juliette van Ardenne as Sira Schilt
- Vivienne van den Assem as Elise Pardoel
- Erwan van Buuren as Alwin Bendorff
- Nicolette van Dam as Bionda Kroonenberg
- Ewout Genemans as Bastiaan van Diemen
- Jon Karthaus as Moes Brinksma
- Patrick Martens as Mike Bosboom
- Monique van der Werff as Taffie Arends
- Thomas Berge as Thomas Berge
- Kim Boekhoorn as Filo Schilt
- Hugo Maerten as Roy Akkermans
- Peggy Jane de Schepper as Mida Steenhoven
