= I Love You Too (2001 film) =

2001 Dutch film

I Love You Too Ik ook van jou
- Directed by: Ruud van Hemert
- Written by: Ronald Giphart (novel); Willeke Frima; Ruud van Hemert
- Produced by: Frank Bak; René Huybrechtse; Marou Jacobs; Frank Thies
- Starring: Antonie Kamerling; Angela Schijf; Beau van Erven Dorens; Florence Kasumba; Dorothee Capelluto; Anniek Pheifer
- Cinematography: Tom Erisman
- Edited by: Ot Louw
- Music by: Marcus Graf; Olaf Wempe
- Distributed by: RCV Film Distribution
- Release date: 15 February 2001
- Running time: 99 minutes
- Country: Netherlands
- Language: Dutch

I Love You Too (Dutch: Ik ook van jou) is a 2001 Dutch drama film, based on a novel by Ronald Giphart.

The film received a Golden Film (75,000 visitors) in 2001, the first film to receive this award.

== Plot ==
The film portrays the relationship between a young male student and a young woman with borderline personality disorder.
