= Martijn Schimmer =

Dutch composer

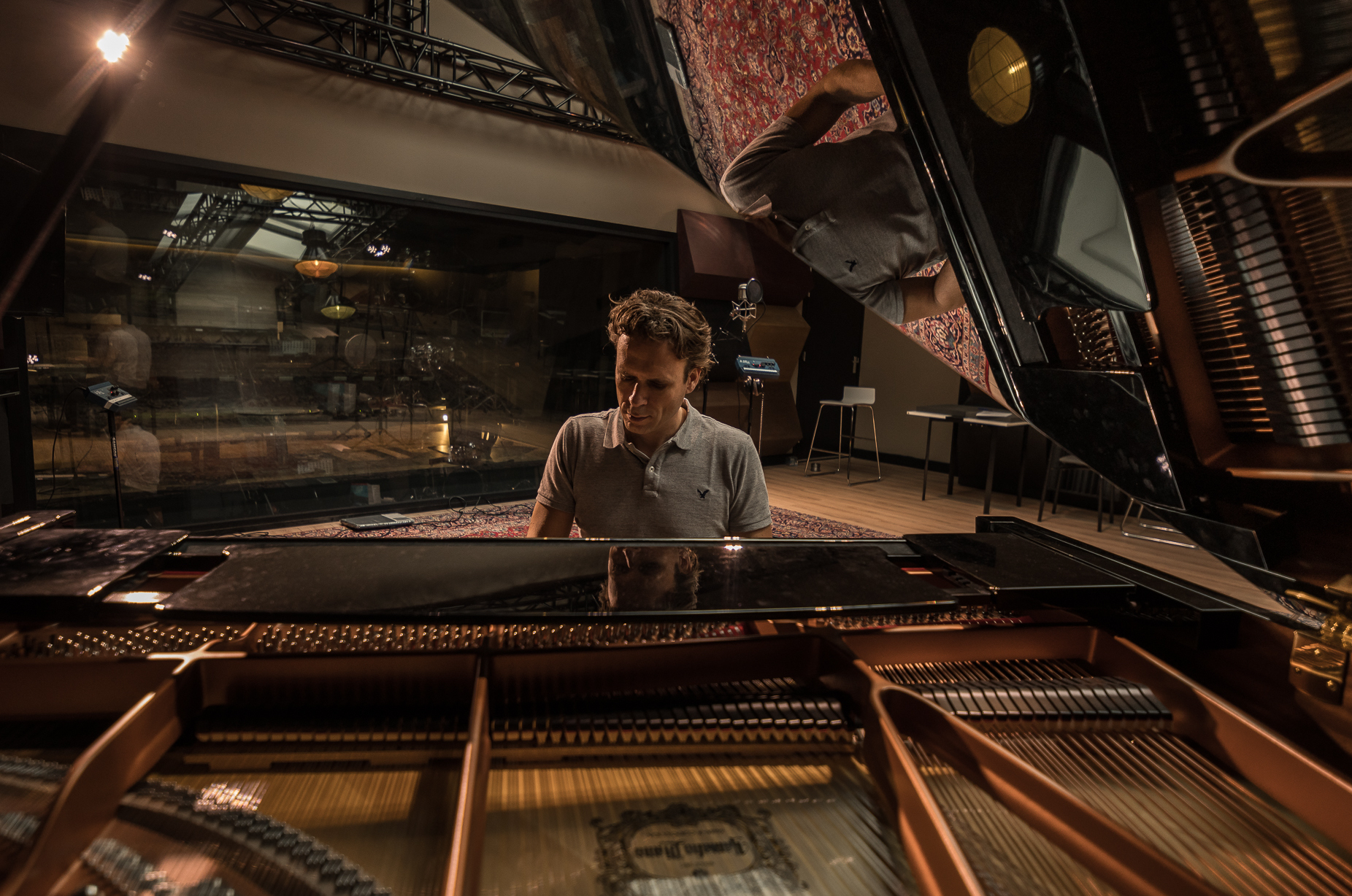
- Born: 21 August 1975 (age 50); Rotterdam, Netherlands
- Known for: Composer, Record producer
- Website: https://www.smp.tv/

Martijn Schimmer (born 21 August 1975) is a Dutch composer and producer of television theme songs and film scores. His work includes the theme music for The Voice, Deal or No Deal, RTL Nieuws, and Splash.

== Early life and career ==
Schimmer was raised in Rotterdam. He started playing drums at the age of 6 and he later switched to keyboard instruments.

As a solo-entertainer at a party, Schimmer came in contact with Hans van Eijck in the early 1990s. At the time Van Eijck was responsible for many theme tunes on Dutch television. He asked Schimmer to come work for him. Schimmer's first job was to write a song for a televised charity event. The song was ultimately sung by artists Anita Meyer and Gordon. At the time, Schimmer was still a teenager living at home with his parents.

In 1995 Schimmer founded Schimmer Music Productions; he was responsible for all facets of production for the company. He composed music, played instruments and occasionally sang song lyrics. His first theme tune was for the television show Peter R. de Vries: Crime Reporter. It was used for the entire 17-year run of the program.

== Film scores and pop songs ==
In 1999 Schimmer began composing music for films and fictionalized television series, after he ended his collaboration with Van Eijck. The Dutch director Johan Nijenhuis commissioned him to write the music for the television series Westenwind. He composed the score for the film Alice in Glamourland, starring Joan Collins. He and Matthijs Kieboom also wrote the score for Fuchsia the Mini-Witch for Walt Disney Pictures.

As part of the soundtrack, Schimmer composed pop songs that were also commercially released and successful in the Netherlands. For the film Costa!, Schimmer composed and produced the song Ritmo! by actress Georgina Verbaan. The song spent fifteen weeks in the Dutch Top 40 and peaked at number eleven. Schimmer later produced pop songs in collaboration with Gerard Joling, Chantal Janzen, Ellen ten Damme and Gordon.

== TV theme tunes and idents ==
In 2005 Schimmer composed the music for the Dutch talk show De Wereld Draait Door, gameshow 1 vs. 100 and the station identity for Dutch broadcaster SBS6. These stayed on the air for over ten years and have become some of Schimmer's most recognizable work. In the years that followed, he composed for other shows on Dutch television, including The Next Uri Geller. He works alongside a group of audio producers and music specialists via his company SMP Amsterdam.

Some international versions of Deal or No Deal and 1 vs. 100 also use Schimmer's theme music. He also composed the theme music for international versions of Celebrity Splash!, Adam Looking For Eve and The Winner Is. But his biggest international success came with his theme music for The Voice, The Voice Kids and The Voice Senior. The hit show is seen in more than 150 countries and all versions, including the American, use Schimmer's theme music.

== Awards ==
In 2012 he won as ASCAP Film and Television Award for his theme music for The Voice. After having won Buma Awards in the Netherlands for a film score and for his television theme tunes, he was presented with a Buma Oeuvre Award Multi Media in 2019 for his entire body of work.

== Compositions ==
=== Film scores ===
- Costa! (2001)
- Full Moon Party (Volle Maan, 2001)
- Alice in Glamourland (Ellis in Glamourland, 2004)
- Snowfever (2004)
- Zoop in Africa (2005)
- Zoop in India (2006)
- Zoop in South America (2007)
- Morrison Gets a Baby Sister (2008)
- SpangaS op Survival (2009)
- Fuchsia the Mini-Witch (Foeksia de Miniheks, 2010)
- Kill Zombie! (Zombibi, 2012)
- Verliefd op Ibiza (2013)
- The Surrender (2014)
- Dummie de Mummie (2014)
- SpangaS in Actie (2015)
- Onze Jongens (2016)
- Gek van Geluk (2017)
- De Film van Dylan Haegens (2018)
- Cuban Love (2019)
- Men at Work: Miami (2020)
- Loving Bali (2024)
