= Johan Nijenhuis =

Dutch film director (born 1968)

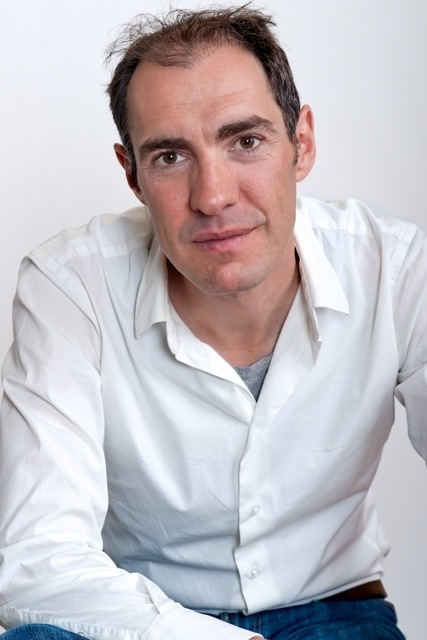
- Johan Nijenhuis
- Born: 4 March 1968 (age 58); Markelo, Netherlands
- Occupations: Film producer; Film director; Screenwriter

Johan Nijenhuis (born 4 March 1968) is a Dutch film producer, director and screenwriter best known for directing commercially successful Dutch romantic comedies for which he has received 21 Golden Film awards starting with Costa! (2001).

== Career ==
After the success of his film Costa!, He founded the production company Nijenhuis & de Levita Film and TV with producer Alain de Levita. it was announced In January 2010 that he had left the company.

His 2019 film Cuban Love (Verliefd op Cuba in Dutch) was his sixth film to win the Platinum Film award. Most of the film was filmed on Cuba with some scenes filmed on Ibiza.

In 2020, his film The Marriage Escape (De beentjes van Sint-Hildegard in Dutch), an adaptation of the 2016 Czech film Tiger Theory, received a nomination for the Golden Calf for Best Feature Film award. It was also the highest-grossing Dutch film of 2020. His film Men at Work: Miami (Onze Jongens in Miami in Dutch) was the second highest-grossing film of that year.

== Awards ==
=== Golden Film and Platinum Film ===
- 2001: Costa!
- 2003: Full Moon Party
- 2013: Verliefd op Ibiza
- 2014: Tuscan Wedding
- 2016: Rokjesdag
- 2019: Cuban Love
- 2020: The Marriage Escape

=== Golden Film ===
- 2010: Fuchsia the Mini-Witch
- 2020: Men at Work: Miami
- 2022: Yasmine's Wedding (Marokkaanse bruiloft)
- 2022: Zwanger & Co
- 2024: Loving Bali
- 2025: Onze Jongens 3
- 2026: Verliefd op Curaçao
