= Golden Film =

Dutch film award

- Awarded for: Box office achievements
- Country: Netherlands
- Presented by: Netherlands Film Festival; Netherlands Film Fund
- First award: 28 September 2001
- Website: http://www.goudenfilm.nl/

The Golden Film (Dutch: Gouden Film) is a film award recognizing domestic box office achievements in the Netherlands. The Golden Film is awarded to films from the Netherlands once they have sold 100,000 tickets. The award is an initiative by the Netherlands Film Festival and the Netherlands Film Fund to increase media attention for Dutch films. For each awarded film there is one trophy for the film crew and another for the film cast.

When the Golden Film was introduced in 2001, it was awarded to films once they had sold 75,000 tickets. In the following years, the public's interest in Dutch films in the Netherlands had increased. In 2003, the audience criterion was increased to 100,000 tickets in an effort to further stimulate the Dutch film industry. Since its introduction, the Golden Film has been awarded to more than 100 films.

While the cast and crew have considered their receiving films to be successful, critics have said that films that sold only 75,000 or 100,000 tickets cannot be considered a commercial success. For this reason the fact that Dutch newspapers report about this award is also criticized.

== Award ==
A Golden Film is awarded to a film from the Netherlands once it has sold 100,000 cinema tickets in the Netherlands during the original cinema circulation. The number of tickets sold is based on box office information provided by the film's distributor and the Netherlands Association of Film Distributors. After a film is awarded the Golden Film, it can receive a Platinum Film after it sells 400,000 tickets and a Diamond Film after it sells 1,000,000 tickets. In addition to these awards, there is the Crystal Film, which is awarded to documentary films that sell more than 10,000 tickets.

The Golden Film is an initiative by the Netherlands Film Festival and the government-subsidized Netherlands Film Fund, with the support of Film Investors Netherlands, to increase the public's awareness of Dutch films in the Netherlands. The Golden Film recognises box office achievements to encourage positive publicity for a film after the initial media attention surrounding its release has begun to wane. The award is similar to the Dutch music industry's Golden Record, that is awarded after selling 40,000 singles, 35,000 popular music albums, or 15,000 classical music albums.

The Golden Film awards are presented during small press ceremonies throughout the year and shortly after a film has reached the audience criterion. The trophies are presented by the director of the Netherlands Film Festival or sometimes by a member of the crew or cast of the film itself. Two trophies are presented for each film: one to the film crew, represented by the producer and the director, and the other to the cast of the film, represented by the lead actors.

The trophy was designed by Jeroen Tirion and consists of a thick square frame, containing a film frame of the awarded movie. The outer frame is made of milled wood, which has a plate attached to it, on the first line inscribed with the text "Gouden Film", three squares, and the year, and on the second line with the film's title.

== History ==
Cinema audience in the Netherlands
Year	Total audience	Dutch film audience	Golden Films
1997	18.9 million	0.70 million (3.7%)	—N/a
1998	20.1 million	1.2 million (6.1%)	—N/a
1999	18.6 million	1.1 million (5.5%)	—N/a
2000	21.6 million	1.3 million (5.9%)	—N/a
2001	23.6 million	2.2 million (9.5%)	4 awards
2002	24.1 million	2.53 million (10.5%)	6 awards
2003	24.9 million	3.30 million (13.26%)	6 awards
2004	23.0 million	2.12 million (9.20%)	9 awards
2005	20.6 million	2.71 million (13.16%)	8 awards
2006	23.4 million	2.62 million (11.18%)	5 awards
2007	22 million^{[ii]}	2.9 million (13.4%)^{[ii]}	8 awards
2008	22 million	3.9 million (17,6%)	14 awards
2009	Pending	Pending	2 awards^{[i]}

The Netherlands Film Festival and the Netherlands Film Fund announced the Golden Film on 4 September 2001. At that time, the Golden Film was awarded to films from the Netherlands once they had been seen by a paying audience of 75,000 or more. The Platinum Film was introduced at the same moment, for films with paying audiences of 200,000 or more. The first Golden Film was awarded on 28 September 2001, to I Love You Too (2001), and by the end of 2002 a total of 10 Golden Films had been awarded.

Within 18 months of the award's introduction, the public's interest in Dutch films in the Netherlands had increased. The audience for Dutch films as a percentage of the total cinema audience in the Netherlands was 5.5% in 1999 and 5.9% in 2000. In 2001, the year of the award's introduction, audiences increased to 9.5%. And in 2002, the audience for Dutch films further increased to 10.5%.

In 2003, the criterion for the award was changed in an effort to further stimulate the Dutch film industry. Films released after 1 January 2003, had to reach paying audiences of 100,000 to qualify for the Golden Film and 400,000 for the Platinum Film. All films that had received a Golden Film before 2003 would also have received a Golden Film under the new criterion. From 2003 until 2007, the percentage of cinema visitors in the Netherlands who watched a Dutch film was between 9.20% and 13.4%.

Since its introduction, the Golden Film has been awarded to 62 films.^{[i]} In 2008, fourteen films were awarded the Golden Film, the highest number to have received the award in a single year.^{[i]} Most of the films that are awarded the Golden Film have taken a week or more to reach the target audience figure. Only Full Moon Party (2002) and Black Book (2006) have reached the criterion, for respectively 75,000 and 100,000 visitors, during their opening weekends.

== Response to the award ==
Recipients consider the Golden Film to be an award given to films that are a success. Director Martin Koolhoven said, when Schnitzel Paradise (2005) received the award, that he did not expect his film to be such a success. Schnitzel Paradise was his first commercially successful film. Fifteen-year-old Sem Veeger, lead actress in the film Keep Off (2006), said she knew that many people had seen the film, but she did not expect it to receive a Golden Film.

Critics of the award have said that films which have sold only 75,000 or 100,000 tickets cannot be considered commercially successful. In 2002, film journalist Ronald Ockhuysen said about the Golden Film:

A good idea – in itself. (...) A positive signal towards the people. But it is doubtful whether the masses pick up the signal. 75,000 visitors makes a meagre, a poor appearance. Especially for films solely made for the masses, like Full Moon Party. Johan Nijenhuis, the director of Full Moon Party, has admitted outright that he considers only 300,000 visitors a failure.^{[iv]}

Ockhuysen also wrote that the Golden Film is a "child of our time" because it tries to reduce the value of a film to its commercial success, and it is supporting films that already have large publicity budgets instead of smaller and more vulnerable productions. Film producer Rob Houwer has said that he believes the Golden Film is the prize for a commercial flop. In 2005, when the criterion for the award had already been increased from 75,000 to 100,000 visitors, he said in an interview:

It is really nothing at all. A failure. It starts to be something for a producer when 350,000 or more cinema tickets are sold. It is incomprehensible why there are media reporting about this award. Why does everybody accept this nonsense?^{[v]}

Dutch newspapers, such as Algemeen Dagblad, De Telegraaf, and NRC Handelsblad, have reported about films receiving the Golden Film. When the film De Scheepsjongens van Bontekoe (2007) had drawn 100,000 visitors to the cinema, the Dutch news agency Algemeen Nederlands Persbureau said the film had reached "the magical threshold of 100,000".^{[iii]}

== Notes ==
- ^{i} As of 1 March 2009.
- ^{ii} More accurate data for 2007 are not available, because the 2007 Annual Report/2008 Year Book of the Dutch Federation for Cinematography is not publicly available on their website, like it was in previous years.
- ^{iii} The phrase "the magical threshold of 100,000" is a translation of the Dutch phrase "de magische grens van 100.000" that was used by the ANP.
- ^{iv} The original quotation of Ronald Ockhuysen in Dutch: "Een goed idee - op zichzelf. (...) 'Een positief signaal naar de mensen toe.' Alleen is het twijfelachtig of het grote publiek dat signaal wel oppikt. 75 Duizend bezoekers heeft iets schraals, iets armoedigs. Zeker als een film, zoals Volle Maan, louter en alleen is gemaakt voor een massapubliek. Johan Nijenhuis, regisseur van Volle Maan, heeft ruiterlijk toegegeven dat hij 300 duizend bezoekers als een mislukking beschouwt."
- ^{v} The original quotation of Rob Houwer in Dutch: "Dat is echt helemaal niks. Een mislukking. Pas vanaf zo'n 350 duizend verkochte bioscoopkaartjes begint het voor de producent ergens op te lijken. Het is onbegrijpelijk dat de media over die prijs berichten. Waarom slikt iedereen deze ongein voor zoete koek?"
