= Golden Calf for Best Acting in a Television Drama =

Dutch television award

The following is a list of winners of the Golden Calf for Best Acting in a Television Drama at the Nederlands Film Festival.

- 1994 Jack Wouterse as Lou – En Route
- 1995 Huub Stapel as Hendrik – De Partizanen
- 1996 Eric van der Donk as Schuyt – De Langste Reis
- 1997 Gilles Biesheuvel as Gillis – Goede daden bij daglicht – That's no Way to Kill your Mother

== Split up ==
In 1998 till 2020 the category was split into two different categories, Best Actor in a Television Drama and Best Actress in a Television Drama.

=== Best Actress ===
- 1998 Saskia Temmink as Claire van Dijk-Bussink – Oud geld
- 1999 Carice van Houten as Suzy – Suzy Q
- 2000 Will van Kralingen as Meriam Blom – Storm in mijn hoofd
- 2001 Joan Nederlof as Grace Keeley – Hertenkamp
- 2012 Rifka Lodeizen as Elsie Couwenberg - Overspel
- 2013 Monic Hendrickx as Carmen van Walraven - Penoza II
- 2014 Loes Schnepper as Lies - One Night Stand IX
- 2015 Ariane Schluter as Helen - One Night Stand X
- 2016 Nazmiye Oral as Neziha - One Night Stand XI
- 2017 Abbey Hoes as Pattie Jagersma - Petticoat
- 2018 Ilse Warringa as Ank van Pijkeren - De Luizenmoeder
- 2019 Rifka Lodeizen as Astrid Holleeder - Judas
- 2020 Halina Reijn as Esther Finkel - Red Light

=== Best Actor ===
- 1998 Gijs Scholten van Aschat as Ole Bussink – Oud geld
- 1999 Jack Wouterse as Ko – Suzy Q
- 2000 Kees Prins as Johnny Jordaan – Bij ons in de Jordaan
- 2001 Pierre Bokma as Marcel Paroo – Belager
- 2012 Jeroen Willems as Mirko Narain - Cop vs. Killer
- 2013 Pierre Bokma as Rijkman Groenink - De prooi
- 2014 Maarten Heijmans as Ramses Shaffy - Ramses
- 2015 Jonas Smulders as Tomas - One Night Stand X
- 2016 Jacob Derwig as Marius Milner - Klem
- 2017 George Tobal & Majd Mardo as Ibrahim and Benyamin - One Night Stand XII
- 2018 Kees Hulst as Hendrik Groen - Het geheime dagboek van Hendrik Groen
- 2019 Gijs Naber as Willem Holleeder - Judas
- 2020 Ramsey Nasr as Ischa Meijer - I.M.

=== Best leading role in a dramaseries (since 2021) ===
- 2021 Werner Kolf as John de Koning - Commando's
- 2022 Jeroen Spitzenberger as Pim Fortuyn - Het jaar van Fortuyn
- 2023 Eva Crutzen as Cat - Bodem
- 2024 Abke Haring as Inge Schepenaer - Een van ons
- 2025 Ahlaam Teghadouini as Sihame Choukour - Sihame
- 2026 Chris Peters as Marco van Basten - Basta

=== Best supporting role in a dramaseries (since 2021) ===
- 2021 Michel Sluysman as Martin de Waard - The Spectacular
- 2022 Charlie Chan Dagelet as Natasja Stigter - Dirty Lines
- 2023 Marit van Bohemen as Sonja Holleeder - Judas
- 2024 Bilal El Aoumari as Ibrahim - Laura H.
- 2025 Bianca Krijgsman as Gertruida van Ree - Dag & nacht
- 2026 Sabri Saddik as Mo - Mocros

=== Best role in a Singleplay or Short Film (since 2021) ===
- 2021 Laura Bakker as Lorah - Onze Straat: Heartbeats
- 2022 Sinem Kavus as Meltem - Mocro Maffia: Meltem
- 2023 Hannah van Lunteren - Ma Mére et Moi
- 2024 Laura Bakker as Marleen - De Ontmoeting - Marleen
- 2025 Joes Brauers as Thomas - Fuck-a-fan
- 2026 Juul Vrijdag as Helen - A Shot at Art
