= Frank Ketelaar =

Dutch screenwriter and director (born 1960)

- Born: 12 August 1960 (age 66); Amsterdam, Netherlands
- Education: Netherlands Film Academy
- Occupations: Screenwriter; director; musician; author
- Years active: 1987-present
- Spouse: Barbara Beukeveld
- Children: 3
- Website: https://www.frankketelaar.nl/

Frank Ketelaar (born 15 March 1960) is a Dutch screenwriter, film and television director. He also used to be a musician, prior to his film career and is best known for being the showrunner for Vuurzee, Overspel and Klem and for his collaborations with Joram Lürsen. He also wrote the screenplay for Blood, Sweat & Tears about the late Dutch singer André Hazes.

== Early life ==
Frank Ketelaar was born on 12 August 1960 in Amsterdam, Netherlands.

After finishing VWO, he went on to study Dutch at the University of Amsterdam. He fairly soon dropped out of school, because he decided he wanted to be a pop musician. He played guitar among others in a new wave band called The Dutch. Later he became a composer in theatre. He was involved in Hauser Orkater, an artist collective.

== Career ==
=== Early career ===
In 1987, Ketelaar would switch careers and focus on filmmaking, he went on to join the Netherlands Film Academy, making him older compared to his fellow students. While at college, he had three projects at the 1990 Netherlands Film Days, he wrote the screenplay for The Finales, a football film that had its debuted on NOS. It was awarded the Cannon-City-award. His second project was Het nadeel van de twijfel, a short film, he co-wrote and was directed by Maarten Treurniet. It was about a childless couple thinking they found an original way to solve their problem. The second one was nominated for two Golden Calves. His third and final project, Groeten uit Grasdijk, a short film he both wrote and directed, was a satire about a conflict between an alderman and an artist, who gives the municipality a pointless piece of art, a yellow sock on a clothesline. Algemeen Dagblad described him as a "talented creator", who could be an "asset for the industry".

Following year, he would graduate with his film, De gelukkige vuilnisman, a comedy short film that follows two brothers, played by Aat Ceelen and Kees Prins, who end up mental institution when one of them wanted to declare himself incapable to work. Mark Moorman proclaimed that Ketelaar "lived up to his name". It was broadcast on Nederland 2 on September 15, 1992. He would also provide his voice for the Dutch dub of Babar: The Movie.

On the Flodder TV series, Ketelaar was part of the creative team in the first season, that had its premiere in 1993. He co-wrote the last six episodes for Sjans with Peter Bolhuis, a show that was originally based on the British sitcom, Singles. The series ran out of material to adapt, however, so Ketelaar was brought in to co-create original storylines. Ketelaar next project was the short-lived comedy show called Achter het scherm broadcast on Veronica in 1995. Described as "television about television", about actors who play in a medical soap drama. It starred Gerard Thoolen, Beppie Melissen and Eric van der Donk. He was also a screenwriter on In voor- en tegenspoed.

In 1997, Ketelaar was the writer-director on a television film, Vijf uur eerder, as part of the Lolamoviola, a yearly initiative organized by VPRO, to help produce low-budget films by young and upcoming filmmakers for the small screen. He also co-wrote Stroop with director Joram Lürsen for VPRO, his second project with Lolamoviola. Ketelaar next television film was De Trein van zes uur tien a 1999 thriller film, he directed based on a screenplay he co-wrote with Joost Prinsen and starring Peter Paul Muller, Roeland Fernhout, Rifka Lodeizen, Halina Reijn and Rudolf Lucieer. The movie was created with the Telefilm program, a collaboration between independent filmproducers and various Dutch public broadcasters, to produce feature-length films for the small screen.

=== 2000s ===
In the 21st century, Ketelaar's first project was the mini-series Bij ons in de Jordaan he co-wrote with Kees Prins and directed by Willem van de Sande Bakhuyzen. The three-part series was about the life of Johnny Jordaan. It won two Golden Calves, one for best television drama and Kees Prins for his role as Johnny Jordaan won Golden Calf for Best Actor. Ketelaar was further more involved in the All Stars television series as a writer.

In 2002, the political drama three-part mini-series Mevrouw de Minister was shown on television. A story Ketelaar first conceived in 1995 that was inspired by Karin Adelmund, it follows Dirkje Holman, an inexperienced female minister who is expected to approve a law she doesn't agree with. His script would be used as basis a Belgian remake called Buitenspel. He has also written a couple of episodes for the medical drama Hartslag, and wrote an episode for De band series.

in 2004, he wrote the screenplay for Joram Lürsen's In Orange. The film follows an eleven-year-old boy trying to reach the Dutch football team with the help of his father until his sudden death of his father. That same year, he wrote Stille nacht, a film loosely inspired by the Utrechtse serial rapist.

His next television film was De uitverkorene, it revolves around the two brothers, Johan and Peter van der Laan, who own their own software company. The film depicts the rise and fall of the company, the story was a loose interpretation of the downfall of the Baan Corporation. that same year, he returned to directorial chair for his follow-up television film, Escort, he also wrote the script. Starting in 2006, he was the showrunner for Vuurzee, a mystery series broadcast by VARA for 12 episodes in 2005/2006. It would receive a second season. The show proved to be major success, creating a long fruitful work relationship with Robert Kievit, who worked at VARA as the head of drama and later head of the whole network.

In 2009, he wrote the script for another Telefim called Coach directed by long-time collaborator Joram Lürsen. A year later, they would reunite again with Het Geheim, the story revolves around the eight year-old Ben (Thor Braun), a boy who loves magic and in particular a big disappearance trick. He gets in trouble when his good-natured but clumsy father (Theo Maassen) manage to make Ben's friend Sylvie (Java Siegertsz) vanish. The film was awarded the Golden Film for having 100.000 visitors.

=== 2010s ===
Ketelaar returned in 2011 as showrunner for VARA with the thriller television series, Overspel, it proved to be an instant success with a second season announced before the first season was finished. It received critical acclaim, positive reception from audiences and it was awarded with two Golden Calves for Best Television Drama and Best Actress. The second season was broadcast two years later. He reluctantly came back for the third and final season in 2015, despite the acclaim, he had to be convinced by the VARA to write the final ten episodes.

In 2013, Ketelaar and Theu Boersma would adapt De Prooi for a three-part mini-series. Like the novel, the show depicts the events of the downfall of ABN AMRO under the guidance of CEO Rijkman Groenink. He and Joram Lürsen would once again come together, this time for Reckless with Tygo Gernandt, Marwan Kenzari and Sarah Chronis in the lead roles. The thriller film was a remake of The Disappearance of Alice Creed and opened the 34st edition of the Netherlands Film Festival.

Ketelaar was tapped to write the screenplay for Blood, Sweat & Tears about the late Dutch singer André Hazes. He co-wrote the script with input from the director Diederick Koopal. The movie received nine nominations at the Golden Calves and was awarded the Golden Film. Further that year, he wrote the script for the historical drama Public Works, directed by Joram Lürsen and based on the novel by Thomas Rosenboom. The film received a Golden Film.

In 2017, Ketelaar's spiritual sequel to Overspel called Klem was released. It follows Hugo, played by Barry Atsma, a widower and a model employee of the Tax and Customs Administration, who comes against his will in contact with a notorious criminal named Marius, played by Jacob Derwig, due to their nine-year-old daughters being best friends. Georgina Verbaan played as Kitty, the girlfriend of Marius. The story was based on a ten-year old film script of his at the time. The hit-show ended after three seasons in 2020, he felt that series had run its course. He would come back one final time for a sequel movie set after the third season. He would be awarded another Golden Film. He reconvened with Joram Lürsen for the romantic comedy Het verlangen, with Chantal Janzen in the lead role.

Ketelaar was brought on as one of the writers of the crime drama Red Light. The writing team consisted of Esther Gerritsen as lead writer with additional writing by Christophe Dirickx, Ketelaar and Halina Reijn, the latter was involved with her production company Man Up and was also one of the main characters. His next series as showrunner was BuZa, it starred Kees Prins as the new minister for foreign relations, who follows up the previous minister who died suddenly, only for him to uncover dark secrets left by his predecessor.

== Personal life ==
He is married to his wife Barbara and they have three children.
