= Golden Calf for Best Television Drama =

Dutch film award

The following is a list of winners of the Golden Calf for best Television Drama at the NFF.

- 2026 Basta
- 2025 Oogappels
- 2024 De Joodse Raad
- 2023 Santos
- 2022 Rampvlucht
- 2021 Singleplay Onze Straat: May
- 2021 Dramaseries: Mocro Maffia
- 2020 Wouter Bouvijn and Anke Blondé - Red Light
- 2019 Rob Lücker - Zeven Kleine Criminelen
- 2018 Tim Oliehoek - Het geheime dagboek van Hendrik Groen
- 2017 Tim Oliehoek - De Zaak Menten
- 2016 Giancarlo Sánchez - One Night Stand IX - Horizon
- 2015 Mees Peijnenburg - One Night Stand X - Geen koningen in ons bloed
- 2014 Dana Nechushtan - Hollands Hoop
- 2013 Boris Paval Conen - Exit
- 2012 Frank Ketelaar, Dana Nechushtan & Arno Dierickx - Overspel
- 2011 Rolf van Eijk - Vast
- 2010 Thomas Korthals Altes - Finnemans
- 2009 Martijn Maria Smits - Anvers
- 2008 Jorien van Nes - Den Helder
- 2007 Peter de Baan - De Prins en het Meisje
- 2006 Frank Ketelaar - Escort
- 2005 Peter de Baan - De Kroon
- 2004 Nicole van Kilsdonk - Deining
- 2003 more than 60 minutes: Theo van Gogh - Najib en Julia
- 2003 less than 60 minutes: Colette Bothof - Dwaalgast
- 2002 Boris Paval Conen - De 9 dagen van de gier
- 2001 Willem van de Sande Bakhuyzen - Familie
- 2000 Willem van de Sande Bakhuyzen - Bij ons in de Jordaan
- 1999 Gerrard Verhage - Dichter op de Zeedijk
- 1998 Arno Dierickx - De zeven deugden: Maria op zolder
- 1997 Theo van Gogh - In het belang van de staat
- 1996 Pieter Kramer - 30 Minuten: Geboren in een verkeerd lichaam
- 1995 Theu Boermans - De partizanen
- 1994 Paula van der Oest - Coma
- 1993 Francken & Treurniet & Planting & v. Duren - Pleidooi

== Sources ==
- Golden Calf Award at Dutch Wikipedia
- Official Golden Calf Website (Dutch)
