= Rent a Friend =

2000 Dutch romantic comedy film

- Theatrical release poster
- Directed by: Eddy Terstall
- Written by: Eddy Terstall
- Produced by: Marc Heijdeman
- Starring: Marc van Uchelen; Natasja Loturco
- Cinematography: Stefan Bijnen
- Edited by: Eddy Zoutendijk
- Music by: Van Dik Hout; Jina Sumedi
- Production companies: Jordaan Film; Fu Works; BNN
- Distributed by: A-Film Distribution (Netherlands); Cinéart (Belgium)
- Release dates: 2 March 2000 (Netherlands); 6 July 2000 (Belgium)
- Running time: 84 minutes
- Country: Netherlands
- Language: Dutch

Rent a Friend is a 2000 Dutch romantic comedy film directed by Eddy Terstall. The film was produced by Jordaan Film and BNN TV.

== Plot ==
Alfred is a talented artist. He does not care to be rich or famous and gives full attention to his artworks and creation. His girlfriend Moniek is a successful writer for a popular soap opera. Alfred's lack of ambition and negligence towards money and material life irritates Moniek, who bases the plot for each soap opera episode on her own life. Alfred discovers Moniek has been conducting an affair with her boss after watching the soap opera, and moves in with his sister after the couple splits. To support himself, he begins offering his services as a friend to strangers at 50 guilders per hour.

== Cast ==
- Marc van Uchelen as Arthur
- Rifka Lodeizen as Moniek
- Nadja Hüpscher as Françoise
- Huub Stapel as Mr. Bloedworst
- Natasja Loturco as Anja
- Victor Löw as Mr. Duitschenbloed
- Peer Mascini as Smulders

== Reception ==
Writing for Variety, David Rooney said the film "feels less spontaneous and fresh than Terstall's prior film Based on the Novel and called it a "slickly produced comedy [that] looks mainly TV-bound [outside its home market]." In a capsule review for Chicago Reader, Ted Shen noted an influence from Woody Allen but called the film "paper-thin" and "sometimes too cute to be effective". Conversely Rotten Tomatoes users stated that 80% of them liked the film with an average score of 3.9 out of 5.
