= Rifka Lodeizen =

Dutch actress (born 1972)

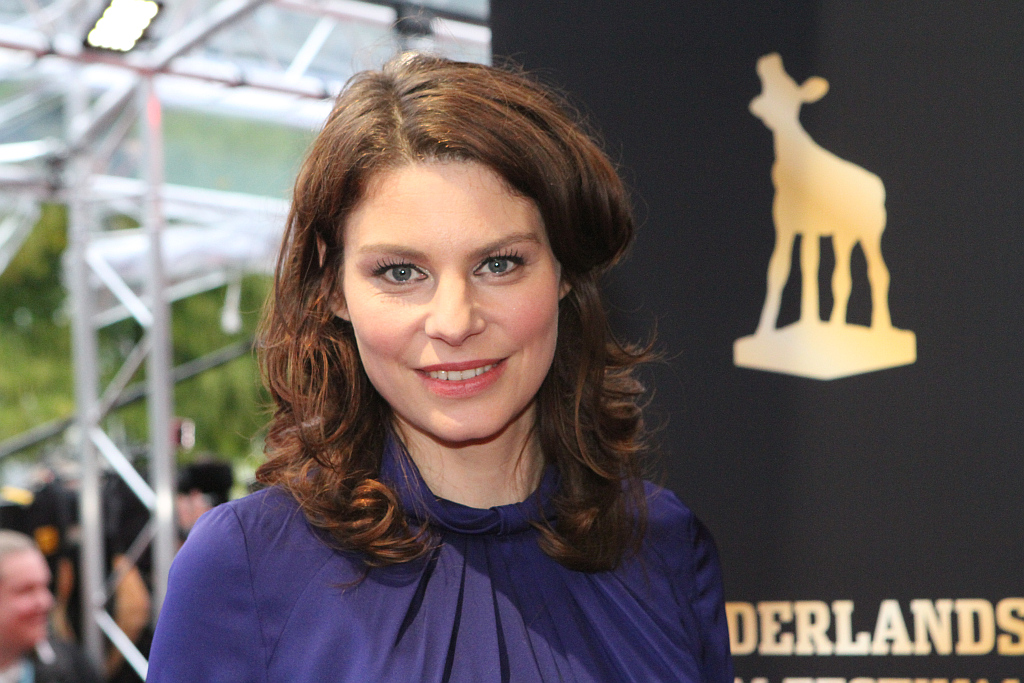
- Lodeizen in 2012
- Born: 16 October 1972 (age 53); Amsterdam, Netherlands
- Occupation: Actress
- Years active: 1991–present
- Awards: Golden Calf for Best Actress 2009 Can Go Through Skin; Golden Calf for Best Actress in a Television Drama 2012 Overspel; Golden Calf for Best Actress in a Television Drama 2019 Judas

Rifka Lodeizen (born 16 October 1972 in Amsterdam) is a Dutch actress.

== Career ==
Lodeizen made her debut with a small role in the 1991 film The Province. She was discovered by film director Eddy Terstall and she played a role in his 1996 film Hufters & hofdames.

Lodeizen won the Golden Calf for Best Actress award at the 2009 Netherlands Film Festival for her role in the film Can Go Through Skin directed by Esther Rots.

She also won the Golden Calf for Best Actress in a Television Drama award in 2012 for her role in the television series Overspel by Frank Ketelaar. She also won this award in 2019 for her role in the television series Judas.

She was also nominated for a Golden Calf award for her roles in the films Tonio (2016) and Disappearance (2017).

Lodeizen also wrote the script for Kleine IJstijd (2017) in collaboration with Paula van der Oest.

In 2021, she appeared in the television series Maud & Babs.

== Personal life ==
Lodeizen is a daughter of Dutch artist Frank Lodeizen. At birth, she was given the name Rifke but as a teenager she decided to change her name to Rifka, the name of her father's sister. Her paternal grandmother was Jewish.

She has two daughters.

== Selected filmography ==
- 1991: The Province
- 1998: Het 14e kippetje (The 14th Chicken)
- 1999: De Boekverfilming (The Book film)
- 2000: Rent a Friend
- 2004: Simon
- 2006: Escort
- 2008: Tiramisu
- 2009: Kan door huid heen (Can Go Through Skin)
- 2012: Hemel (Heaven)
- 2014: Jongens (Boys)
- 2015: Public Works
- 2016: Tonio
- 2017: Verdwijnen (Disappearance)
- 2018: Fenix
- 2020: Ares
- 2022: Modern Love Amsterdam
