= De Trein van zes uur tien =

1999 film directed by Frank Ketelaar

- Directed by: Frank Ketelaar
- Written by: Frank Ketelaar; Joost Prinsen
- Produced by: Hans de Weers; Justine Paauw
- Starring: Peter Paul Muller; Roeland Fernhout; Rifka Lodeizen; Halina Reijn; Rudolf Lucieer
- Cinematography: Tom Erisman
- Edited by: René Wiegmans
- Music by: Vincent van Warmerdam
- Production company: Egmond Film and Television
- Distributed by: AVRO TV
- Release date: 5 May 1999
- Running time: 93 minutes
- Country: Netherlands
- Language: Dutch

De Trein van zes uur tien (English: The 18.10 Train) is a 1999 Dutch thriller film directed by Frank Ketelaar based on a screenplay he co-wrote with Joost Prinsen and starring Peter Paul Muller, Roeland Fernhout, Rifka Lodeizen, Halina Reijn and Rudolf Lucieer. The movie was part of an initiative between independent filmproducers and various Dutch public broadcasters, called Telefilm, to produce feature length films for television.

== Cast ==
- Peter Paul Muller as Onno Staling
- Roeland Fernhout as Alex Bickers
- Rifka Lodeizen as Merel Dankmeijer
- Halina Reijn as Mieke Volkers
- Rudolf Lucieer as Kumfus
- Marnie Blok as Secretary Camilla
- Jordy Krant as Baby Jacob
- Gwen Eckhaus as Spiritual leader
- Leopold Witte as Employment officer
- Hugo Koolschijn as Social worker
- Alwien Tulner as Anneke
- Diederik Ebbinge as Yup
- Khaldoun Elmecky as Policeman Brouwer (as Khaldoun el Mecky)
- Rodney Beddal as Inspector (as Rodney Beddall)
- Rinco van der Baan as Ober (as Rimco van der Baan)
