= Zus & Zo =

2001 film by Paula van der Oest

- Theatrical release poster
- Directed by: Paula van der Oest
- Screenplay by: Paula van der Oest
- Produced by: Jacqueline de Goeij
- Starring: Monic Hendrickx; Anneke Blok; Sylvia Poorta; Jacob Derwig; Halina Reijn
- Cinematography: Bert Pot
- Edited by: Sander Vos
- Music by: Fons Merkies
- Production companies: Filmprodukties De Luwte; Cine Summer CV; NPS
- Distributed by: RCV Film Distribution
- Release dates: 15 September 2001 (TIFF); 8 May 2002 (Netherlands)
- Running time: 100 minutes
- Country: Netherlands
- Language: Dutch
- Box office: $281,219

Zus & Zo is a 2001 Dutch fantasy romantic comedy film film directed and written by Paula van der Oest and starring Monic Hendrickx, Anneke Blok, Sylvia Poorta, Jacob Derwig and Halina Reijn. The film follows Nino's impending wedding to a woman despite being gay, sparking conflict among his three sisters who aim to stop the marriage, ultimately leading to revelations about Nino's true identity.

Zus & Zo premiered at the 2001 Toronto International Film Festival, around the September 11 attacks. It made its debut in Dutch cinemas on May 8, 2002. The movie received mixed reviews from critics. It was nominated for the Academy Award for Best Foreign Language Film.

== Plot ==
Nino's 33rd birthday is approaching when he surprises his family by announcing his impending marriage in three weeks. This revelation shocks not only his mother but also his three sisters: Sonja, a writer married to Hugo; Michelle, heavily involved in charity work and married to Jan; and Wanda, a single artist who has been having an affair with Hugo. All three sisters are troubled by Nino's decision, knowing he is gay and has lived with Felix for years. They suspect the marriage is solely for the sake of inheriting their late father's hotel, Paraíso, a promise made to Nino if he ever married, despite his lack of romantic interest in women.

The sisters confront Nino during his visit to the registrar, where they meet his girlfriend, Bo, who surprises them with her warmth. Despite their initial plan to break up Nino and Bo, they are unsuccessful. Meanwhile, Sonja discovers Hugo and Wanda's affair and retaliates by including a scene in her new article about women's fantasies involving her and Jan.

As the wedding in Portugal approaches, Bo involves the sisters in the preparations, unaware of their initial intentions. The sisters eventually disclose Nino's sexuality to Bo, who responds positively, revealing her awareness and acceptance of Nino and Felix's relationship. However, Bo's subsequent announcement of her pregnancy with Nino's child complicates matters, leading Nino to confront his own doubts and realization of being transgender.

On the wedding day, Nino's mother intervenes by inviting Felix, prompting Nino to halt the ceremony and confess his true feelings to Bo. Bo supports Nino's decision to be true to himself and facilitates his reunion with Felix. The registrar proceeds to marry Nino and Felix on the same day.

In the aftermath, Nino undergoes gender confirmation surgery, while Bo gives birth to their child. The family reunites in the hospital, where Felix places their newborn in Nino's arms.

== Cast ==
- Monic Hendrickx as Sonja
- Anneke Blok as Wanda
- Sylvia Poorta as Michelle
- Jacob Derwig as Nino
- Halina Reijn as Bo
- Theu Boermans as Hugo
- Jaap Spijkers as Jan
- Annet Nieuwenhuyzen as Moeder
- Pieter Embrechts as Felix Delicious
- Marisa van Eyle as Dorien
- Josine van Dalsum as Bo's mother

== Reception ==
Zus & Zo has an approval rating of 40% on review aggregator website Rotten Tomatoes, based on 20 reviews, and an average rating of 4.9/10. Metacritic assigned the film a weighted average score of 50 out of 100, based on 9 critics, indicating "mixed or average reviews".

A. O. Scott of The New York Times said in 2003 that the acting, especially by the actresses portraying the three sisters, was "unassuming and precise," but he noted that the film suffers from being "inadvertently a little misogynistic." Eddie Cockrell of Variety described it as "a complicated confection" and remarked that "convoluted plot aside, [it is] universally understandable."

== Unrealized remake ==
Around the Dutch theater release in 2002, RCV Film Distribution announced that they had sold the rights for an American remake to producers Renee Missel and Jonathan Dana, with the intention that Paula van der Oest would return as the director. Filming was supposed to take place the following year, and van der Oest envisioned either Cameron Diaz, Julianne Moore or Jodie Foster in the lead role.
