= The Afghan (film) =

2002 film directed by Paula van der Oest

- Directed by: Paula van der Oest
- Written by: Carel Donck
- Produced by: Emjay Rechsteiner
- Starring: Laurien Van den Broeck as Claire; Hunter Bussemaker; Johan Leysen; Jemma Redgrave
- Cinematography: Guido van Gennep
- Edited by: Sander Vos
- Music by: Fons Merkies
- Production companies: Staccato Films; Spice Factory; Great British Films; Delux Prods; Peppermint
- Distributed by: A-Film Distribution
- Release date: 27 September 2002
- Running time: 91 minutes
- Countries: Netherlands; England; Germany; Luxembourg
- Language: English

The Afghan (originally titled Moonlight) is a 2002 Dutch thriller film directed by Paula van der Oest and written by Carel Donck and starring Laurien Van den Broeck, Hunter Bussemaker, Johan Leysen and Jemma Redgrave. It was entered into the 25th Moscow International Film Festival.

== Cast ==
- Laurien Van den Broeck as Claire
- Hunter Bussemaker as Boy
- Johan Leysen as Father
- Jemma Redgrave as Mother
- Andrew Howard as Gang Leader
- Stephen Tate as Patient
- Sarah Markianidis as Girl Student
- Emma Drews as Daphne
- Valerie Scott as Teacher
- Aurélie Petrini as Girl with disability
- Ann Comfort as Nun
- Dean Gregory as Priest
- Pieter Riemens as Photographer
- Luc Schreiner as Driver
- David Bustard as Gang Member 1
- Elvir Sabanovic as Gang Member 2
- Halina Reijn as Woman in Car
