= A. F. Th. van der Heijden =

Dutch author (born 1951)

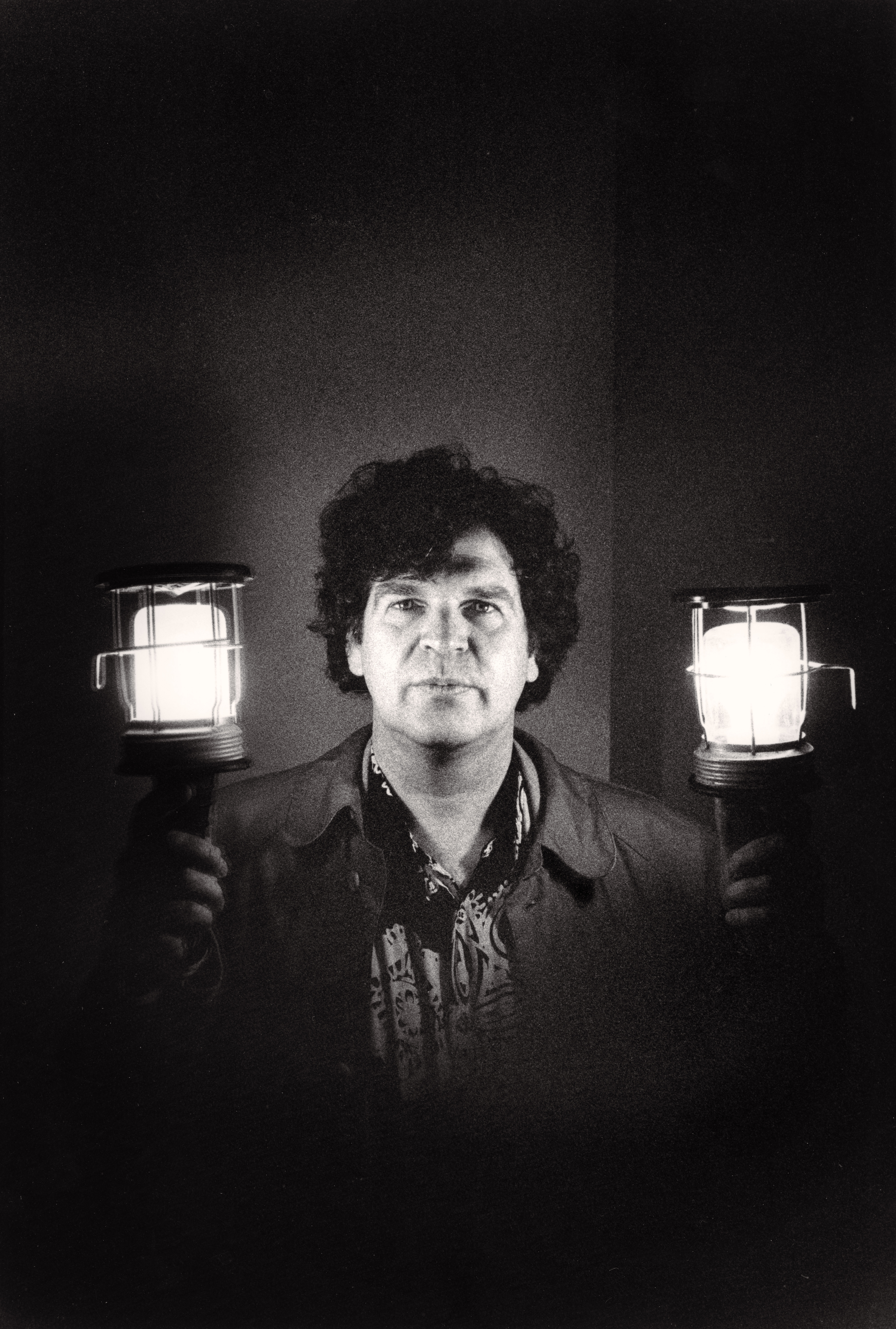
A. F. Th. van der Heijden (1996)

Adrianus Franciscus Theodorus van der Heijden (born 15 October 1951) is a Dutch writer.

Van der Heijden was born in Geldrop, and studied psychology and philosophy in Nijmegen. After moving to Amsterdam he turned to writing. His first two books appeared under the pseudonym Patrizio Canaponi: the short story collection Een gondel in de Herengracht ("A Gondola in the Herengracht", 1978, Anton Wachter Prize, 1979) and the novel De draaideur ("The Revolving Door", 1979). Van der Heijden then began publishing under his own name in the 80s. Van der Heijden has won many awards, including all the big Dutch literary awards: the 2013 P. C. Hooft Award for his entire oeuvre, the 2012 Libris Literatuur Prijs for Tonio, and the 2007 AKO Literatuurprijs for Het schervengericht and the 1997 AKO Literatuurprijs for Onder het plaveisel het moeras. Some of Van der Heijden's books have been translated into German, Russian, Finnish, Swedish, Spanish and Bulgarian.

Van der Heijden (or A.F.Th. as he is called among book lovers) is most known for his multi-novel saga De tandeloze tijd ("The Toothless Time") about his alter-ego Albert Egberts. The saga describes his youth in Geldrop, his student days in Nijmegen and his life afterward in Amsterdam in the seventies and eighties.

In 2003 Van der Heijden started a new saga: Homo Duplex, based on characters of the Greek tragedies in a contemporary setting.

== Awards and honors ==
- 2013 P.C. Hooft-prijs
- 2012 Libris Literatuur Prijs, winner, Tonio
- 2011 Constantijn Huygens Prize
- 2009 De Inktaap, winner, Het schervengericht
- 2008 Tzumprijs voor de beste literaire zin, winner, Mim
- 2007 AKO Literatuurprijs, winner, Het schervengericht
- 2003 Schrijversprijs der Brabantse Letteren
- 1997 Golden Owl, winner, Het Hof van Barmhartigheid & Onder het Plaveisel het Moeras
- 1997 AKO Literatuurprijs, winner, Onder het plaveisel het moeras
- 1986 Ferdinand Bordewijk Prijs, winner, De gevarendriehoek
- 1986 Multatuliprijs, winner, De gevarendriehoek
- 1979 Anton Wachterprijs, winner, Bouwval

== Bibliography ==
Overview of significant publications:

- Een gondel in de Herengracht (1978; stories)
- De draaideur (1979, novel)
- De slag om de Blauwbrug De tandeloze tijd Prologue (1983, novel)
- Vallende ouders De tandeloze tijd Volume 1 ("Parents Falling"; 1983, novel)
- De gevarendriehoek De tandeloze tijd Volume 2 (1985, novel)
- De sandwich (1986, novel)
- Het leven uit een dag (1988, novel)
- Advocaat van de Hanen De tandeloze tijd Volume 4 (1990, novel) – film adaptation as Punk Lawyer
- Weerborstels De tandeloze tijd Intermezzo (1992, short story)
- Asbestemming. Een requiem (1994, novel)
- Het Hof van Barmhartigheid De tandeloze tijd Volume 3 Book 1 ("The Court of Mercy"; 1996, novel)
- Onder het plaveisel het moeras De tandeloze tijd Volume 3 Book 2 ("Under the Pavement the Swamp"; 1996, novel)
- De Movo tapes Homo duplex Volume 0 (2003, novel)
- Engelenplaque (2003, Diary-notes 1966 -2003)
- Drijfzand koloniseren Homo duplex ("Colonizing quicksand"; 2006, novel)
- Het schervengericht Homo duplex (2007, novel)
- Mim (2007, short story) – inspired on De versierde mens by Harry Mulisch on the celebration of his 80th birthday
- Gentse lente (2008, stories)
- Doodverf (2009, novel)
- Tonio (2011, novel)
  - Made into a Dutch-language movie in 2016 by director Paula van der Oest.
- Zogkoorts De tandeloze tijd Volume 13 (2023, novel)

== De slag om de Blauwbrug ==
De slag om de Blauwbrug ("Battle at the Blue Bridge") is the prologue to De tandeloze tijd and is one of the most controversial books in contemporary Dutch literature. The novel focuses on the events surrounding the coronation of Queen Beatrix on 30 April 1980. The whole event is seen through the eyes of a social reject and ex-convict who is walking in the streets of Amsterdam at that particular day. He witnesses violent clashes between police and anti-monarchist anarchist squatters who provoke riots during the coronation, protesting against poor housing conditions and using the occasion to tackle the institution of monarchy and the idea of government authority in general. The novel's main character is only observing the brutal clashes without participating or taking sides. The riots cause flashbacks to the important political events into his memory: from the Vietnam War to the R.A.F. terrorist attacks in the 1970s.
