= The Bay of Silence =

2020 thriller film

- Film poster
- Directed by: Paula van der Oest
- Written by: Caroline Goodall
- Based on: The Bay of Silence by Lisa St Aubin de Terán
- Produced by: Alain De Levita; Cheyanne Kane; Jason Newmark; Caroline Goodall
- Starring: Claes Bang; Olga Kurylenko; Alice Krige; Assaad Bouab; Brian Cox
- Cinematography: Guido van Gennep
- Edited by: Sander Vos; Paul Tothill
- Music by: John Swihart
- Production companies: Silent Bay Productions; Media Finance Capital; Vigilant Entertainment; Imperative Entertainment; TS Entertainment; Ngage Productions; New Scope Film; Levitate Film
- Distributed by: Vertical Entertainment; Signature Entertainment
- Release dates: 25 July 2020 (Shanghai International Film Festival); 14 August 2020 (United States); 28 September 2020 (United Kingdom)
- Running time: 93 minutes
- Countries: United Kingdom; The Netherlands
- Language: English
- Box office: $38,806

The Bay of Silence is a 2020 British-Dutch thriller film directed by Paula van der Oest from a screenplay by Caroline Goodall, based on the 1986 novel of the same name by Lisa St Aubin de Terán. It stars Claes Bang, Olga Kurylenko, Alice Krige, Assaad Bouab and Brian Cox.

== Plot ==
Rosalind and Will live an enviable life in London. She is a celebrated artist, he is a dependable engineer and a willing stepfather to her twin eight-year-old daughters. When the difficult birth of their son, Amadeo, rocks Rosalind's carefully calibrated world, she abruptly disappears with her children and the young nanny, Candy. Will suspects a link to a recently arrived suitcase from France, filled with faded photographic negatives.

He launches a frantic search across Europe, locating them at the cliff-top Normandy home of Rosalind's dead photographer uncle. But relief turns to horror when he discovers his son has mysteriously died. Hiding in the dilapidated house, Rosalind is too traumatized to recognize him, the twins speak in riddles and Candy has disappeared. A desperate Will sees two options: Report the tragedy and risk his wife being accused of murder or cover it up and protect his family. Unable to believe his wife is culpable, Will secretly buries Amadeo in the dead of night and flees France with his family to a Swiss mountain clinic to help Rosalind recover. When Will confides in her mother, Vivian, she confesses Rosalind's mental instability linked to being raped at fourteen. Will reluctantly agrees to a car accident "cover story", orchestrated by her powerful art dealer stepfather, Milton, in order to protect Rosalind.

Rosalind returns home but it is Will who cannot return to "normal". He roams London, secretly investigating the mystery of his wife's past until his obsession and grief drive the vulnerable Rosalind to take refuge with Milton. In a race against time, Will finds the missing Candy who helps him piece together what happened the night his son died, and uncovers the identity of the mysterious Pierre Laurent, who holds the key to Rosalind's secrets. When an unarmed Will faces a vengeful Milton, it is Rosalind, in a dramatic twist who decides Milton's fate. Finally, they return to the Bay of Silence in Liguria, Italy, where their story began, to learn if love can conquer all.

== Cast ==
- Claes Bang as Will Walsh
- Olga Kurylenko as Rosalind Palliser
- Brian Cox as Milton Hunter
- Alice Krige as Vivian Palliser
- Assaad Bouab as Pierre Laurent
- Caroline Goodall as Marcia
- Duncan Duff as Curator

== Production ==
In April 2018, it was announced Claes Bang, Olga Kurylenko, and Brian Cox had joined the cast of the film, with Paula van der Oest directing from a screenplay by Caroline Goodall, based upon the novel of the same name by Lisa St Aubin de Terán.

Principal photography began in July 2018, in Newcastle upon Tyne, England.

== Release ==
In February 2020, Vertical Entertainment acquired distribution rights to the film in the United States, and Signature Entertainment in the United Kingdom, Australia and New Zealand. The film premiered on July 25, 2020, at the Shanghai International Film Festival. The film was released on 14 August 2020 through virtual cinemas and VOD in the United States and Canada, and it also opened in select American cinemas. It will be released on DVD and digital download in the United Kingdom on 28 September 2020.

=== Critical reception ===
The Bay of Silence received generally negative reviews from critics. As of October 2021, 52% of the 31 reviews compiled on Rotten Tomatoes are positive, with an average rating of 5.4/10. The site's critical consensus reads, "The Bay of Silence's committed performances may be enough for thriller fans, but its twist-heavy plot adds up to a muddled affair."
