= R U There =

2010 film

- Dutch poster
- Directed by: David Verbeek
- Written by: Rogier de Blok
- Produced by: Arnold Heslenfeld
- Starring: Stijn Koomen
- Cinematography: Lennert Hillege
- Edited by: Sander Vos
- Release date: 15 May 2010
- Running time: 90 minutes
- Countries: Taiwan; Netherlands
- Languages: Dutch; English

R U There is a 2010 Taiwanese-Dutch drama film directed by David Verbeek. It was entered into the Un Certain Regard section of the 2010 Cannes Film Festival. At the 2010 Netherlands Film Festival the film won the awards for Best Cinematography and Best Sound Design.

== Cast ==
- Stijn Koomen as Jitze
- Huan-Ru Ke as Min Min
- Tom De Hoog as coach Luc
- Phi Nguyen as Hai Li
- Pavio Bilak as Vlad
- David Eugene Callegari as John
- David Davis as Paulo
- Amanda Philipson as Mia
- Robert Samudion as Brazilian Boy
