= Freemarket (film) =

1997 film

Vrijmarkt
- Directed by: Hans Hylkema
- Release date: 1997
- Country: Netherlands
- Language: Dutch

Freemarket or Vrijmarkt is a 1997 Dutch drama film directed by Hans Hylkema.

== Cast ==
- Anneke Blok
- Bert Geurkink
- Sylvia Holstijn
- Onno Hooimeyer
- Stephanie van der Schley
- Mohamed Shirwa
- Jaap Spijkers
- Jack Wouterse
