= The Northerners =

1992 film

- Theatrical release poster
- Directed by: Alex van Warmerdam
- Written by: Alex van Warmerdam
- Produced by: Laurens Geels; Dick Maas
- Starring: Leonard Lucieer; Jack Wouterse; Annet Malherbe; Rudolf Lucieer; Loes Wouterson; Alex van Warmerdam; Veerle Dobbelaere; Jacques Commandeur; Theo van Gogh; Dary Somé
- Cinematography: Marc Felperlaan
- Edited by: René Wiegmans
- Music by: Vincent van Warmerdam
- Production company: First Floor Features
- Distributed by: United International Pictures
- Release date: 17 April 1992
- Running time: 107 minutes
- Country: Netherlands
- Language: Dutch

The Northerners (Dutch: De Noorderlingen) is a 1992 Dutch film written and directed by Alex van Warmerdam. The film was selected as the Dutch entry for the Best Foreign Language Film at the 65th Academy Awards, but was not accepted as a nominee. This black comedy takes places in the 1960s, in a surreal Dutch new town consisting of only a single street. It is a darkly amusing satire of bourgeois life and its repressions, pursuit of fantasies through a Freudian forest are all executed with visual and dramatic flair. Van Warmerdam himself has said that he considers this his best film.

It won him a (Gouden Kalf) for best director, and the movie was nominated for the International Fantasy Film Award. Actor Rudolf Lucieer won a Gouden Kalf for his role as Anton, the forester. The movie is part of the official Canon of Dutch films and has gained cult film status.

== Plot ==
A surreal black comedy set in a decrepit 1960s housing development. When Thomas' mother Martha is drawn into sainthood and changes their home into a shrine this frustrates his father the local butcher, Jacob and he finds it difficult to manage it all with his sexual needs. Thomas, 12-year-old son, becomes obsessed with events on the broadcast news – the liberation of the Belgian Congo is taking place and Thomas calls himself Lumumba, after the Congolese leader Patrice Lumumba. Thomas spends hours alone in the forest. It is there that he meets Agnes, a half-naked woman who lives in the forest and hides at the bottom of a pond and shows him how to breathe underwater using a reed. He is encouraged in this escapism by Simon, the postman who reads all the mail and knows all of the bizarre and intimate secrets of the eccentric inhabitants of the town.

Meanwhile, Anton a gun-crazed forester moves around the forest in search of trespassers. He is incapable of meeting his wife, Elisabeth's needs. Adding further complications are two Belgian priests who visit the town, bringing with them an exhibition of Africana and a Negro. Jacob turns into a cad and attacks women. Thomas has sexual confrontations with Agnes, but often disturbed by his mother's "divine" premonitions. Anton who is engaged in activities outside his family life, captures Simon red-handed in his act (looking at the school teacher's subscribed adult magazine) and tries to capture the Negro. Anton accidentally kills Agnes and hides the body under the pond. The Negro sees this and blinds Anton. Later Anton seeks the Negro to kill and finds him, but leaves him alone. Elizabeth knowing she is pregnant with Jacob's child leaves Anton, since he has turned asexual. Meanwhile, Martha's fasting has rendered her bedridden and the villagers pray at her window believing her to be a saint rather than a depressed woman. The church officiates Martha as a saint. Things go beyond Jacob can handle. Later blind Anton is found dead from the cold under a tree by the Negro. The Negro leaves the Town. Later through the news its heard Lumumba is murdered, which saddens Thomas. Simon comes back to the settlement housing unit as the official post-master, Thomas welcomes him wholeheartedly.

== Cast ==
- Jack Wouterse as Jacob
- Annet Malherbe as Martha
- Rudolf Lucieer as Anton
- Loes Wouterson as Elisabeth
- Leonard Lucieer as Thomas
- Alex van Warmerdam as Simon
- Veerle Dobbelaere as Agnes
- Dary Somé as Negro
- Jacques Commandeur as Teacher
- Theo van Gogh as Fat Willy
- Loes Luca as Fat Willy's Mother
- Annemarie Blom as Neighbour
- Cecile Heuer as Neighbour
- Leny Breederveld as Neighbour
- Olga Zuiderhoek as Neighbour

== Accolades ==
Accolades received by The Northerners
Year	Award	Category	Recipient(s)	Result	Ref.
1992	Netherlands Film Festival	Golden Calf for Best Director	Alex van Warmerdam	Won	
1992	Netherlands Film Festival	Golden Calf for Best Actor	Rudolf Lucieer	Won	

== See also ==
- List of submissions to the 65th Academy Awards for Best Foreign Language Film
- List of Dutch submissions for the Academy Award for Best Foreign Language Film
