= Stijn Koomen =

Dutch actor (born 1987)

- Born: Stijn Mathias Koomen; March 18, 1987 (age 38); Amsterdam
- Occupation: Actor
- Years active: 1999-present

Stijn Mathias Koomen (born March 18, 1987) is a Dutch actor.

== Early years ==
At age 10 he started his education in acting at the theaterschool for youth in Amsterdam (AJTS). His television-career started at the age of 12 in the Dutch television series, Wat nou?!, from Dutch director Eddy Terstall. In 2002, Koomen starred as Mick, the older brother of Willem in the Dutch children's TV hit series Ik ben Willem. Koomen played in all three seasons of the series between the ages of 14 and 21.

== Film roles ==
Two years later, Koomen played a role in the movie Simon, directed by (Eddy Terstall, 2004). The movie won in 4 categories of the National Dutch Film Awards (Gouden Kalveren). Simon was also the Dutch entry for the Oscars in 2005.

Koomen also played in the independent movies Diep, (Simone van Dusseldorp, 2005) and “Tussenstand” by Mijke de Jong. In the latter, he was one of the main characters next to Marcel Musters and Elsie de Brouw.Tussenstand won 3 National Dutch Film Awards as well as several international awards.

In 2009, Koomen played the leading role in the international film R U There by David Verbeek. R U There premiered during the international Cannes Film Festival in the section: un certain regard. It eventually won 2 National Dutch Film Awards and was sold internationally.

After R U There Koomen played in various short movies and television films. Amongst them: Valdrift (Jasper Wessels, 2010) and Mijn Marco (Sarah Verweij, 2011).He also guest starred in a variety of television series such as Van God Los (2012) and GTST (2014).
