= Tonio (film) =

2016 film

- Theatrical release poster
- Directed by: Paula van der Oest
- Written by: A.F. Th. van der Heijden; Hugo Heinen
- Starring: Chris Peters
- Cinematography: Gudio van Gennep
- Edited by: Sander Vos
- Music by: Fons Merkies
- Production companies: NL Film & TV
- Distributed by: September Film
- Release date: 22 September 2016
- Running time: 100 minutes
- Country: Netherlands
- Language: Dutch
- Box office: $832,787

Tonio is a 2016 Dutch drama film directed by Paula van der Oest. It was based on the memoir of the same name by A.F. Th. van der Heijden. It was selected as the Dutch entry for the Best Foreign Language Film at the 89th Academy Awards, but it was not nominated. The film won the Pearl Award at the Film by the Sea festival in the Netherlands in 2017.

== Cast ==
- Chris Peters
- Pierre Bokma
- Rifka Lodeizen
- Henri Garcin
- Stefanie van Leersum

== Synopsis ==
After a traffic accident kills their twenty-one year old son, a novelist and his wife attempt to cope with the loss.

== See also ==
- List of submissions to the 89th Academy Awards for Best Foreign Language Film
- List of Dutch submissions for the Academy Award for Best Foreign Language Film
