= Simon (2004 film) =

Dutch drama film

- Theatrical release poster
- Directed by: Eddy Terstall
- Written by: Eddy Terstall
- Produced by: Imko Nieuwenhuijs
- Starring: Cees Geel; Marcel Hensema
- Cinematography: Willem Nagtglas
- Edited by: Ben Isaacs
- Production companies: Spaghetti Film; VPRO
- Distributed by: A-Film Distribution
- Release date: 30 September 2004
- Running time: 100 minutes
- Country: Netherlands
- Language: Dutch
- Box office: $1,107,774

Simon is a 2004 Dutch drama film written and directed by Eddy Terstall. The story is about two male friends, one heterosexual and one gay. Same sex marriage and euthanasia are prominent themes of the film. The film has won three Golden Calves, for Best Actor (Cees Geel), Best Director (Eddy Terstall) and Best Feature Film, as well as the Audience Award (Eddy Terstall) of the Netherlands Film Festival. It was also the Dutch entry for the Oscars in 2005, but it was not nominated.

== Plot ==
One of the characters is Camiel, a gay dentist who marries his lover and the other is Simon (Cees Geel), a heterosexual drugs dealer and lady magnet. They become close friends in the late 1980s, but Camiel does something that interrupts their friendship.

After fourteen years Camiel and Simon meet again, but Simon is now terminally ill with cancer.

Simon has a daughter, Joy (Nadja Hüpscher) and a son, Nelson (Stijn Koomen). They develop a friendship with Camiel and his husband and after Simon's death Camiel adopts them.

== Cast ==
- Cees Geel as Simon Cohen
- Marcel Hensema as Camiel Vrolijk
- Rifka Lodeizen as Sharon
- Nadja Hüpscher as Joy
- Eva Duijvestein as Ellen
- Daan Ekkel as Marco
- Dirk Zeelenberg as Bram
- Stijn Koomen as Nelson
- Johnny de Mol as Floris (billed as Johnny de Mol jr.)
- Maria Kooistra as Gwen
- Femke Lakerveld as Adrienne
- Natasja Loturco as Astrid, Camiel's Assistant
- Araba Walton as Gisela
- Medi Broekman as Priscilla
- Dennis Rudge as Sjimmie
- Helena Remeijers as Djoeke
- Esmarel Gasman as Merjolein
- Wilhelmija Lamp as Alijt (billed as Willemijn Lamp)
- Klavertje Patijn as Liselot
- Ron Schuitemaker as Sjors (billed as Ron Schuitema)
- Jenayden Adriaan as Bruce
- Lisa Kuil as Samantha
- Laura Dozzelne as Joy - Age 7 (billed as Laura Dozzolne)
- Jeroen Willems as Huisarts
- Aaron Wan as Neurologist
- Howard van Dodemont as Traffic Cop
- Henk Kreekel as 2nd Opinion Arts
- Nico Huisman as Student
- Emmanuel K. Obinna as (Soldier #1) (billed as Emmanuel Obinna K)
- Troy Patterson as (Soldier #2)
- Matt Kosokoff as Director
- Pee Chantrarangsan as Thaise Man in Bar

== Reception ==
Simon received positive reviews. On Rotten Tomatoes the film has an approval rating of 67% based on reviews from 6 critics, and an average rating of 5.7/10. On Metacritic it has a score of 59 out of 100, based on reviews from 5 critics, indicating "mixed or average reviews".

Jay Weissberg of Variety wrote: "Slick packaging and easy ensemble-playing can't mask hoary 'gather round, I'm dying' formula."

Awards
Preceded by De Tweeling	Golden Calf for Best long feature film 2004	Succeeded by Paradise Now
