= De Pijnbank =

1998 film

- Theatrical release poster
- Directed by: Theo van Gogh
- Written by: Justus van Oel
- Produced by: Hans Pos
- Starring: Paul de Leeuw; Jack Wouterse; Roeland Fernhout; Eric van Sauers
- Music by: Rainer Hensel
- Production company: Shooting Star Filmcompany
- Distributed by: Shooting Star Filmdistribution
- Release date: 10 September 1998
- Running time: 102 minutes
- Country: Netherlands
- Language: Dutch

De Pijnbank is a 1998 Dutch drama film directed by Theo van Gogh. The screenplay was written by cabaret artist Justus van Oel, based on a play he wrote with the same title. The story is set in a bank that has recently merged, where two bank employees are played against each other by their manager, and a bank customer played by Paul de Leeuw wants to exact revenge for how he was treated during a past bankruptcy.

== Cast ==
- Eric van Sauers ... Martin Krawinkel
- Paul de Leeuw ... Jos Vlierboom
- Roeland Fernhout ... Bouke van Lier
- Ted Schipper ... Taxidriver
- Dave Schram ... Security Guard
- Camilla Siegertsz ... Secretary
- Aad Tobeck ... Taxidriver
- Justus van Oel ... Workman
- Jack Wouterse ... Peter de Boc
