= Havinck =

- Theatrical release poster
- Directed by: Frans Weisz
- Written by: Marja Brouwers; Ger Thijs
- Produced by: Gijs Versluys
- Starring: Willem Nijholt
- Cinematography: Giuseppe Lanci
- Edited by: Ton Ruys
- Music by: Egisto Macchi
- Distributed by: Holland Film Releasing
- Release date: 15 October 1987
- Running time: 101 minutes
- Country: Netherlands
- Language: Dutch

Havinck is a 1987 Dutch drama film directed by Frans Weisz. It was screened in the Un Certain Regard section the 1988 Cannes Film Festival.

== Plot ==
Havinck, an Amsterdam lawyer, is doing well for himself. He is successful, happily married and has a beautiful daughter. Everyone agrees he gives the impression that he goes through life unmoved, without emotion.

Then a turning point occurs in Havinck’s life. His wife is involved in a fatal accident, but her death appears to be suicide. This is confirmed when Havinck’s daughter, Eva, finds her mother’s suicide note. She realizes that her mother took her own life and confronts her father with the letter. They exchange harsh words about the marriage, which had completely fallen apart due to Havinck’s infidelity. It turns out he has been keeping a mistress and has never given his daughter enough attention. His other daughter, Lydia, has also committed suicide, something Havinck does feel guilty about.

After the confrontation, Havinck falls into an emotional crisis. With great difficulty, he recovers and is able to rebuild his relationship with Eva.

== Cast ==
- Willem Nijholt - Lawyer Havinck
- Will van Kralingen - Havinck's wife Lydia
- Carolien van den Berg - Havinck's mistress Maud
- Anne Martien Lousberg - Havinck's daughter Eva
- Maarten Wansink - Greve
- Coen Flink - Bork
- Max Croiset - Havinck's father-in-law
- Dora van der Groen - Havinck's mother-in-law
- Kenneth Herdigein - Kenneth
- Eric van Heyst - Noordwal
- Ella van Drumpt - Havincks secretary
- Lieneke le Roux - Bork's secretary
- Lex de Regt - Detective
- Dorijn Curvers - Policewoman
- Han Kerkhoffs - Policeman
- Ger Thijs - Probation officer
