= Film by the Sea =

Film festival

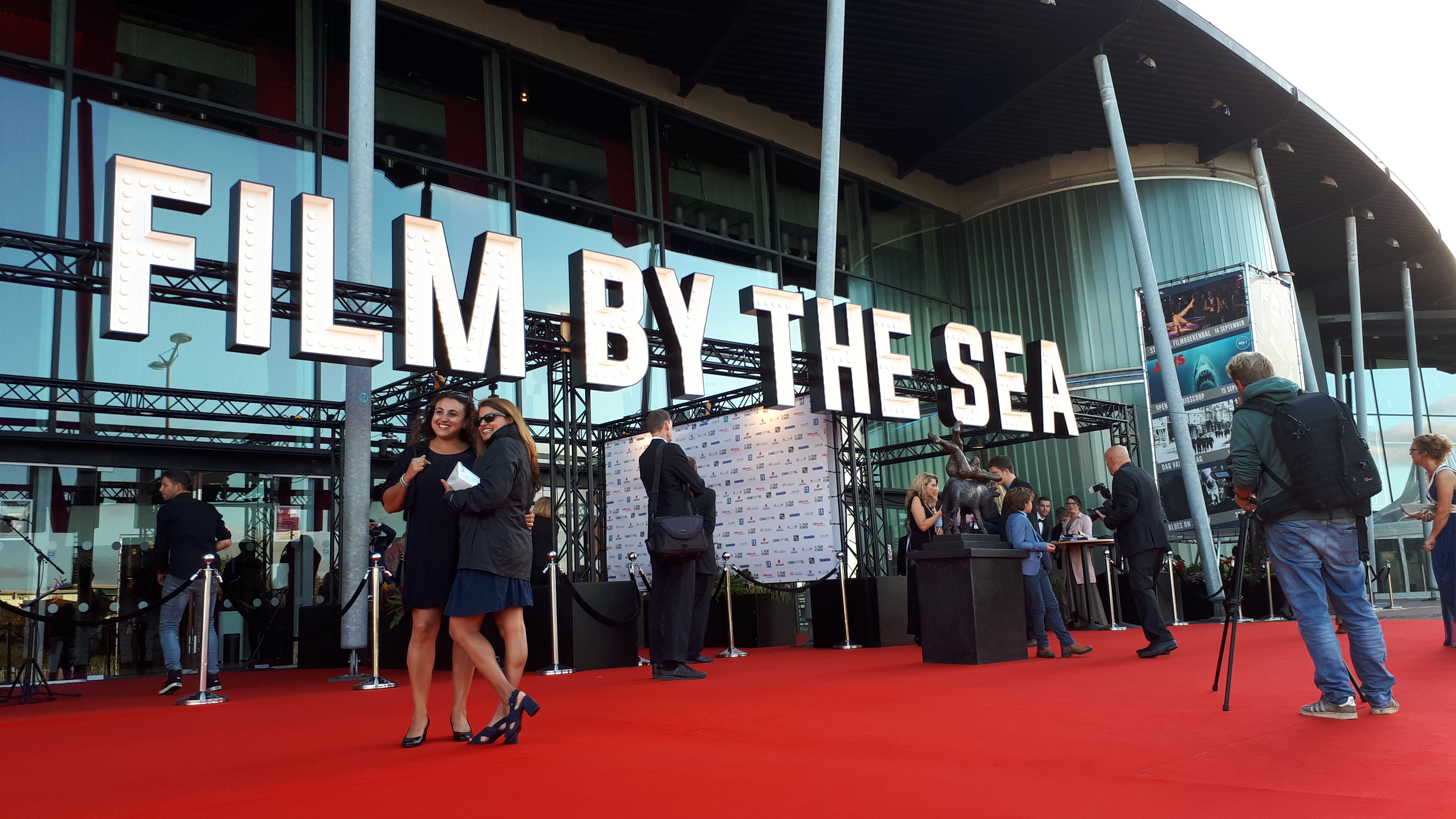
- Location: Vlissingen, Netherlands
- Language: Dutch, English
- Website: filmbythesea.nl

Film by the Sea is an annual film festival that takes place in Vlissingen, Netherlands, in September.

== Festival ==
Film by the Sea was founded in 1999. The festival features both pre-premieres of major commercial films, and art house films that do not yet have a distributor in the Netherlands. A main focus of the festival is on films based on literature, which is connected to an annual festival competition. Film by the Sea takes place annually in the Cine City cinema in Vlissingen. The festival was attended by 43,300 people in 2016, and is the fourth-biggest film festival in the Netherlands. The festival has been led by artistic director Leo Hannewijk since 1999.

== Awards ==
Awards presented include the Film and Literature Award, the Grand Acting Award, the Pearl for adapted feature film, and the Sylvia Kristel Award.

=== Grand Acting Award ===
- 2000: Morgan Freeman
- 2007: Ben Kingsley
- 2008: Michael Nyqvist
- 2013: Jan Decleir
- 2014: Rutger Hauer
- 2015: Monic Hendrickx
- 2016: Claudia Cardinale
- 2017: Bruno Ganz

=== The Pearl ===
The Pearl is an award for the best filmed adaptation of a book, voted by the public.

- 2014: 12 Years a Slave
- 2015: Still Alice
- 2016: Public Works
- 2017: Tonio

=== Sylvia Kristel Award ===
Created two years after the 2012 death of Dutch actress Sylvia Kristel of the Emmanuelle film series, this prize is awarded to someone who, like Kristel, embodies the idea of a cultural phenomenon and source of inspiration.

- 2014: Sylvia Hoeks
- 2015: Genevieve Gaunt
- 2016: Nina de la Parra
- 2017: Romy Louise Lauwers
