= Football Parents =

- Voetbalouders
- Genre: Comedy
- Created by: Ilse Warringa
- Written by: Ilse Warringa
- Directed by: Ilse Warringa
- Starring: Ilse Warringa; Eva van Gessel; Mariana Aparicio
- Country of origin: Netherlands
- Original language: Dutch
- No. of seasons: 1
- No. of episodes: 6

Original release
- Network: Netflix
- Release: 16 May 2025

Football Parents (Dutch: Voetbalouders) is a Dutch comedy television series that premiered on 16 May 2025. The series was created by Ilse Warringa and distributed by Netflix.

The centres around parents' over-reactions on the sidelines during football matches, and was inspired by the real-life experiences of the creator and writer Warringa.
