= Undercover (2019 TV series) =

Belgian-Dutch Dutch-language crime drama TV series on Netflix

- Genre: Drama, Crime
- Created by: Nico Moolenaar
- Starring: Tom Waes; Anna Drijver; Frank Lammers
- Countries of origin: Belgium, Netherlands
- Original languages: Dutch, Flemish, Belgian French
- No. of seasons: 3
- No. of episodes: 28

Production
- Producers: Nico Moolenaar; Jan Theys; Ivy Vanhaecke
- Production locations: Belgium; France; Netherlands; Germany

Original release
- Network: Eén; Netflix
- Release: 24 February 2019 – 9 January 2022

Undercover is a Belgian-Dutch Dutch-language crime drama television series starring Tom Waes, Anna Drijver and Frank Lammers. The plot revolves around a story inspired by real-life events, where undercover agents infiltrate a drug kingpin's operation in Limburg, a Flemish province bordering the Netherlands. The infiltration is executed by two agents, Bob Lemmens (Tom Waes) and Kim de Rooij (Anna Drijver), who are posing as a couple at the campground where the drug kingpin spends his weekends.

It is a co-production between Netflix and public Belgium TV station Eén, and was ordered direct-to-series. The first season premiered on Eén on February 24, 2019, in Belgium; its second season was scheduled for a September 6, 2020 release on Eén. The series began streaming on Netflix on May 3, 2019. It was renewed for a second season which premiered on November 8, 2020. Season 3 premiered in November 2021.

== Cast ==
=== Season 1 ===
- Tom Waes as Bob Lemmens
- Anna Drijver as Kim De Rooij
- Frank Lammers as Ferry Bouwman
- Elise Schaap as Danielle Bouwman
- Raymond Thiry as John Zwart
- Robbie Cleiren as Marc Gevers
- Manou Kersting as Nick Janssens
- Katrien De Ruysscher as Liesbeth Mertens
- Huub Smit as Dennis de Vries
- Lieke van den Broek as Sonja van Kamp
- Sara De Bosschere as Lena Vandekerckhove
- Kevin Janssens as Jurgen van Kamp
- Kris Cuppens as Walter Devos
- Nina Mensch as Jezebel van Kamp
- Emma Verlinden as Polly Lemmens
- Warre Verlinden as David Lemmens

=== Season 2 ===
- Wim Willaert as Laurent Berger
- Sebastien Dewaele as Jean-Pierre Berger
- Ruth Becquart as Nathalie Geudens
- Celest Henri Cornelis as Jackson Geudens
- Chris Lomme as Yvet Berger
- Sarah Vandeursen as Betty
- Robrecht Vanden Thoren as T-Bone
- Mourade Zeguendi as Vincent Messaoudi
- Sanne Samina Hanssen as Lisa

=== Season 3 ===
- Nazmiye Oral as Leyla Bulut
- Murat Seven as Serkan Bulut
- Gökhan Girginol as Timur Celik
- Gökhan Kizilbuga as Mehmet
- Yannick van de Velde as Lars van Marken
- Wouter Hendrickx as Tanguy Dupont
- Jeroen van der Ven as Patrick Diericks

== Episodes ==
Season	Episodes	Originally released
1	10	May 3, 2019
2	10	November 9, 2020
3	8	November 21, 2021

=== Season 1 (2019) ===
No. overall	No. in season	Title	Directed by	Written by	Original release date
1	1	"Camping Zonnedauw"	Frank Devos & Eshref Reybrouck	Lars Damoiseaux & Eveline Hagenbeek	May 3, 2019
2	2	"Hoogsensitief" "Highly Sensitive"	Frank Devos	Lars Damoiseaux & Eveline Hagenbeek	May 3, 2019
3	3	"Italian Designer Drugs"	Frank Devos	Lars Damoiseaux & Eveline Hagenbeek	May 3, 2019
4	4	"Legio Patria Nostra"	Frank Devos	Lars Damoiseaux & Eveline Hagenbeek	May 3, 2019
5	5	"Over de grens" "Over the Border"	Eshref Reybrouck	Lars Damoiseaux & Eveline Hagenbeek	May 3, 2019
6	6	"Sirenes" "Sirens"	Eshref Reybrouck	Lars Damoiseaux & Eveline Hagenbeek	May 3, 2019
7	7	"De kop van die wout" "That Cop's Face"	Eshref Reybrouck	Lars Damoiseaux & Eveline Hagenbeek	May 3, 2019
8	8	"Nouveau Monde" "New World"	Eshref Reybrouck	Lars Damoiseaux & Eveline Hagenbeek	May 3, 2019
9	9	"Bodem" "Rock Bottom"	Eshref Reybrouck	Lars Damoiseaux & Eveline Hagenbeek	May 3, 2019
10	10	"Showtime"	Eshref Reybrouck	Lars Damoiseaux & Eveline Hagenbeek	May 3, 2019

=== Season 2 (2020) ===
No. overall	No. in season	Title	Directed by	Written by	Original release date
11	1	"El Dorado"	Pieter Van Hees	Unknown	September 6, 2020
12	2	"Pentagon"	Unknown	Unknown	September 13, 2020
13	3	"Soldiers of Love"	Unknown	Unknown	September 20, 2020
14	4	"Trojan Horse Power"	Unknown	Unknown	September 27, 2020
15	5	"Revolution"	Unknown	Unknown	October 4, 2020
16	6	"Victor"	Unknown	Unknown	October 11, 2020
17	7	"Enrichochet"	Unknown	Unknown	October 18, 2020
18	8	"Roadblock"	Unknown	Unknown	October 25, 2020
19	9	"Reconstruction"	Unknown	Unknown	November 1, 2020
20	10	"War"	Unknown	Unknown	November 8, 2020

=== Season 3 (2021) ===
No. overall	No. in season	Title	Directed by	Written by	Original release date
21	1	"Boze oog" "Evil Eye"	Joël Vanhoebrouck	Unknown	November 21, 2021
22	2	"Festival Shop Super Sales"	Joël Vanhoebrouck	Unknown	November 28, 2021
23	3	"Trust issues"	Joël Vanhoebrouck	Unknown	December 5, 2021
24	4	"All-in Resort"	Joël Vanhoebrouck	Unknown	December 12, 2021
25	5	"Rat in the kitchen"	Joël Vanhoebrouck	Unknown	December 19, 2021
26	6	"Pater Familias"	Joël Vanhoebrouck	Unknown	December 26, 2021
27	7	"Total Loss"	Joël Vanhoebrouck	Unknown	January 2, 2022
28	8	"Showdown"	Joël Vanhoebrouck	Unknown	January 9, 2022

== Release ==
The full first season consisting of 10 episodes premiered on Netflix streaming on May 3, 2019.

== Reception ==
Writing for Decider, John Serba gave season 1 a moderately positive review, stating: "It has a generic title and premise, but Undercover has a smidgen of a Euro-backwoods Justified vibe, some subtle comedy and just enough eccentricity in its tone and characters to make it interesting." Ready Steady Cut's Daniel Hart reviewed the second and third seasons, giving both 4 out of 5 stars. He writes about season 2: "Round two of Undercover works. It has the right balance of chemistry between the characters that make an addictive crime thriller." And about season 3: "This Netflix series has made a tense viewing again, standing firm as a formidable dark horse."

== Prequels ==
In May 2021, Netflix released Ferry, a film prequel to the series and, in 2023, Ferry: The Series, an eight-part further prequel. In December 2024, movie Ferry 2 was published.
