= Tom Waes =

Belgian presenter and actor

Tom Yvo Adrien Waes
- Born: November 7, 1968 (age 57); Merksem, Belgium
- Occupations: Actor; TV presenter; TV director; Singer
- Years active: 2005–present
- Known for: Undercover
- Website: http://www.tomwaes.be/

Tom Yvo Adrien Waes (born 7 November 1968) is a Belgian television presenter, television director, actor, model, and occasional singer. Internationally he is most known for his role in the Netflix series Undercover. In addition, Waes is an ambassador for the non-profit organization Sea Shepherd.

== Biography ==
After high school, Waes studied Germanic philology for a year and then trained as a deep-sea diver in Scotland, after which he worked on drilling platforms as a deep-sea diver for several years.

=== Television and film career ===
Before becoming known to the general public, Waes made films for De Quizmaster and De laatste show and had a role in De Zaak Alzheimer. In 2005, his fame increased due to his role as the brother of Bart De Pauw in Het Geslacht De Pauw. He appeared in the film Buitenspel and, together with Koen Van Impe and Jan Van Looveren, made the comedy TV program Tragger Hippy. In 2007, he was a judge on the first series of the Comedy Casino Cup. In 2009, he was Raketman and with Sofie Van Moll the presenter of the television program Hartelijke groeten aan iedereen. In 2009, he appeared in the film SM-rechter and presented The One Man Show, a late-night quiz on Eén. On April 28, 2010, his new program De Oplichters started on VT4. In this program, he, along with other famous Flemish people, deceived people. As a director, he worked on De Quizmaster, Via Vanoudenhoven, Alles komt terug, Het Geslacht De Pauw, De Planckaerts, and Zonnekinderen.

==== Tomtesterom ====
In 2008, Tom Waes had his own TV program Tomtesterom, in which he tried out "How to..." manuals with the aim of completing a certain challenge before the end of the program. In this program, he launched the schlager Dos cervezas, which immediately became a summer hit. The last performance of Tom Waes as a schlager singer was at the Laundry Day dance festival in Antwerp on September 4, 2010. In 2011, there was a second single Eén is geen as an attachment to a one-off magazine TOM, which revolved entirely around him. The proceeds from the single went entirely to Sea Shepherd.

One of the challenges in the 2010 series was his participation in the Marathon des Sables, a 250 km running race through Morocco, which was run in 6 days. Tom Waes finished in 495th place, in a time of 48 hours 29 minutes 32 seconds with an average speed of 5.13 kilometers per hour. In 2012, Tom Waes broke the Belgian record for ski jumping, 14 meters from a K25. He also managed to get into the Guinness Book of Records with the competition "Fastest Time to Eat a 12" Pizza". This record has since been improved by someone else.

In 2012, he succeeded in landing a Boeing 737 in Ostend and Brussels Airport in the first episode of the third season. Another notable achievement is his attempt to swim across the Strait of Dover from Dover to Calais. He managed to reach 22 km but was forced to abandon his attempt due to hypothermia.

==== Reizen Waes ====
After three seasons of Tomtesterom, Waes began the travel program Reizen Waes in 2012, in which he visits dangerous or notable places. It has been aired since the fall of 2013, with the season in 2021 focusing on Waes's travel through Flanders based on viewer tips. In the Netherlands, the episodes are aired by the VPRO. In season 2022, he traveled through the Netherlands, a production in collaboration with the VPRO.

==== Other programs ====
In 2013, Waes participated in the third season of the TV show Beste vrienden on the Azores with Bart De Pauw. That same year, he lost the pilot episode of Wauters vs. Waes, a simultaneous game show on both major Flemish channels in which he represents Eén against VTM presenter and adventurer Koen Wauters in ten duels suggested by the viewers. As a result of his loss in the pilot episode, Waes's name appears in the title of the show after Wauters.

In 2015, he was seen as the father of the Vrancken family in the TV series Nieuw Texas. Later that year, he was the host of Echt niet OK with Cath Luyten. He also won De Slimste Mens ter Wereld in 2015. In the final, he defeated Danira Boukhriss. Earlier in the season, he had already participated in the quiz eleven times. In connection with the 2018 World Cup in Russia, he made a parody of his Schlager song Dos cervezas, this time called Dva vodka. The song received great interest in Belgium and even reached the Russian news. In 2016, he was a member of the jury on De Slimste Mens ter Wereld. In the fall of 2022, he participated in De Allerslimste Mens ter Wereld.

==== Undercover ====
Waes plays a leading role in the series Undercover, playing the undercover agent Bob Lemmens. The television series was produced by both Netflix and the Belgian public TV station Eén. It was released directly as a full series, with the first season premiering on Eén in Belgium on February 24, 2019, and being made available on Netflix on May 3, 2019. The second season was scheduled for release on Eén on September 6, 2020, and was eventually released on November 8, 2020. The third season premiered in November 2021.

=== Television prizes ===
In 2015 Waes won three prizes at the WorldMediaFestival: Reizen Waes won in the category 'Travel Documentaries', Wauters vs. Waes in the 'Other Entertainment' category and The Blacklist, a program for children in which Waes tries to make six seemingly impossible dreams come true, in the 'Children/Youth Special Entertainment' category.

== Personal life ==
Waes has three children. Apart from Dutch he speaks German, English, French and Spanish.

On November 30, 2024, Waes was seriously injured in a car accident in Antwerp. Around 1:00 in the morning he drove his vintage Porsche into a crash absorber. The roof of the car had to be cut open to free him. After being in mortal danger for several hours, he was declared out of danger in the morning of the 30th. According to his family, his condition is "serious, but stable". He suffered multiple fractures and was kept in an artificial coma.

== Filmography ==
=== Films ===
Year	Title	Role
2004	Flikken	Hein Goorts
2004–2005	Het Geslacht De Pauw	Tom De Pauw
2005	Beloofd	
2005	Tragger Hippy	Various
2005	Buitenspel	Patrick
2006–2012	Aspe	Various
2009	SM-rechter	Dominant P
2012–2013	Tegen de Sterren op	Various
2013	Traumland	Neighbour
2015	Nieuw Texas	young Ludo Vrancken
2015	Safety First: The Movie	Himself
2019-heden	Undercover	Bob Lemmens

=== Television ===
Year	Television program
2008–2012	Tomtesterom
2009	The One Man Show
2010	De Oplichters
2013-heden	Reizen Waes
2014	Wauters vs. Waes
2014, 2019	The Blacklist
2015	Echt niet OK
2019	Kamp Waes
2023	Het verhaal van Vlaanderen

=== Singles ===
Song	Date	Charts
Dos cervezas	07-05-2010	Radio 2 summer hit of 2010; Nr. 1 in the Flemish top 10
Eén is geen	2011	
Dva vodka	08-06-2018	Nr. 8 in de Flemish top 50
