= Temmink: The Ultimate Fight =

- Directed by: Boris Paval Conen
- Written by: Arend Steenbergen
- Produced by: Jeroen Beker; Frans van Gestel; Will van Gestel
- Starring: Jack Wouterse; Jacob Derwig; Will van Kralingen
- Cinematography: Danny Elsen
- Music by: Urban Dance Squad
- Production companies: Motel Films; VPRO
- Distributed by: RCV Film Distribution
- Release date: 2 July 1998
- Running time: 90 minutes
- Country: Netherlands
- Language: Dutch

Temmink: The Ultimate Fight is a Dutch movie from 1998 directed by Boris Paval Conen, starring Jack Wouterse, Jacob Derwig and Will van Kralingen.

== Plot summary ==
Sometime in the near future the main character, the sociopathic Temmink, beats a passerby to death and ends up in the so-called "Arena" - a modern version of the ancient Roman Colosseum. In an acrylic glass cage, criminals with a violent past fight each other for life or death like Roman gladiators, albeit with their bare hands in a cagefight without rules. As Temmink survives fight after fight and thus prolongs his stay in the Arena he undergoes changes. For the first time in his life he is capable of loving and makes friendship. In the background a discussion develops in the media and society in general about the ballot (who fights who) possibly being fixed and about the whole principle of convicted criminals fighting each other to death in front of a crowd.

== Cast ==
- Jack Wouterse - Temmink
- Jacob Derwig - David
- Herman Gilis - The Master
- Will van Kralingen - Yvonne Bouhali
- Joe Montana - Goliath
- Martin Schwab - Saddam
