= Public Works (film) =

2015 film

- Theatrical release poster
- Directed by: Joram Lürsen
- Written by: Frank Ketelaar
- Based on: Publieke werken by Thomas Rosenboom
- Produced by: Frans van Gestel; Arnold Heslenfeld; Laurette Schillings
- Starring: Gijs Scholten van Aschat; Jacob Derwig
- Cinematography: Mark van Aller
- Edited by: Peter Alderliesten
- Music by: Merlijn Snitker
- Production companies: Topkapi Films; Menuet; Im FILM; Mythberg Films Ltd
- Distributed by: September Film Distribution
- Release date: 30 November 2015
- Running time: 115 minutes
- Country: Netherlands
- Language: Dutch
- Budget: €6 million
- Box office: $1,790,201

Public Works (Dutch: Publieke werken), also distributed under the title A Noble Intention, is a 2015 Dutch historical drama directed by Joram Lürsen based on a script written by Frank Ketelaar based on the novel of the same name by Thomas Rosenboom. It was based on the book of the same name by Thomas Rosenboom about the troubled construction of the Victoria Hotel in Amsterdam. It was listed as one of eleven films that could be selected as the Dutch submission for the Best Foreign Language Film at the 89th Academy Awards, but it was not nominated. The film won the Pearl Award at the Film by the Sea festival in the Netherlands in 2016.

== Plot ==
The narrative is based on two historic facts: one, the Victoria hotel in Amsterdam, opposite the Central Station, has two nineteenth-century houses incrusted in its facade. Two, the pharmacist Anijs in Hoogeveen was known for his commitment to improve the lives of a group of families of dirt-poor peat-cutters.

The main character, Walter Vedder, a violin maker, was in the 1880s the owner of one of the houses opposite the Central Station. Aware of his strong position to negotiate, he demands a fortune for his property. Together with his cousins Christian Anijs in Hoogeveen and Al Vedder in the United States, he develops the idea to use this fortune to offer the poor peat-cutters the opportunity to emigrate to the United States. Public works such as in this case the construction of a railway station, can have unforeseen an unwanted effects on the lives of people but the cousins have the noble intention to achieve social justice on their own.

Tragedy is inevitable since the developers are not willing to pay Vedder's price. The poor families from the peatlands embark on an ill-advised journey but are saved by a surprising element of culture that the cousins did not value.

== Cast ==
- Gijs Scholten van Aschat as Walter Vedder
- Jacob Derwig as Anijs
- Rifka Lodeizen as Martha
- Zeb Troostwijk as Klein Pet
- Juda Goslinga as Bennemin
- Elisabeth Hesemans as Mother Bennemin
- Joosje Duk as Johanna Bennemin
