= Nazmiye Oral =

Dutch actress and writer

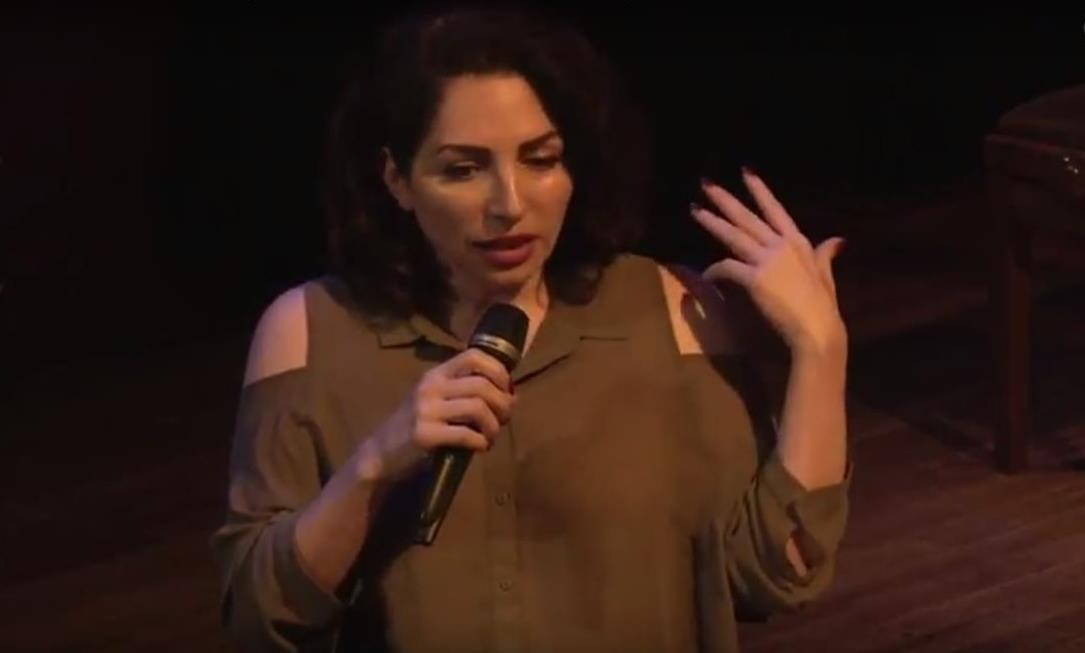
- Nazmiye Oral in 2017
- Born: 1969 (age 56–57); Hengelo
- Occupations: Actress, writer
- Known for: Golden Calf for Best Acting in a Television Drama
- Notable work: Undercover
- Children: 2

Nazmiye Oral (born 1969) is a Dutch actress and writer. She has won a Golden Calf for Best Acting in a Television Drama.

== Career ==
Nazmiye Oral began her career working for Dutch Muslim Broadcasting and interviewing figures such as Theo van Gogh and Pim Fortuyn. She subsequently has acted in films, television series and plays. In 2016, she won the Golden Calf for Best Acting in a Television Drama for her role playing a concerned mother in One Night Stand. Oral appeared in the third season of Undercover playing a mafia boss, in 2021. A voice coach helped her to hone the Flemish accent.

Oral is also a writer. She was a columnist for De Volkskrant from 2003 until 2012 and wrote weekly columns for De Gelderlander for a year. In 2001 released a novel entitled 'Zehra' which was nominated for the E. du Perron Prize. She wrote and performed the play Niet meer zonder jou (No longer without you). with her own mother.

== Personal life ==
Oral was born in Hengelo in the Netherlands, in 1969. From the age of 6 until 10 she lived with her grandparents in a small village in Turkey. She then returned to the Netherlands, studying fashion in Arnhem. Her parents set up an arranged marriage which she avoided by marrying a Dutch man instead. In her first marriage she had two daughters and in 2021 became engaged a second time.
