= Long Live the Queen (film) =

Dutch children's film about chess

- Theatrical release poster
- Directed by: Esmé Lammers
- Written by: Esmé Lammers
- Produced by: Laurens Geels; Dick Maas
- Starring: Monique van de Ven; Tiba Tossijn; Derek de Lint
- Cinematography: Marc Felperlaan
- Edited by: Mark Glynne; Hans van Dongen
- Music by: Paul M. van Brugge; Eric-Jan Vos
- Production company: First Floor Features
- Distributed by: Concorde Entertainment Group
- Release date: 15 November 1995
- Running time: 118 minutes
- Country: Netherlands
- Language: Dutch
- Box office: $0.3 million (Netherlands)

Long Live the Queen (Dutch: Lang Leve de Koningin) is a 1995 Dutch children's film written and directed by Esmé Lammers. It tells the tale of a little girl who learns to play chess thanks to enchanted chess pieces. The film was selected as the Dutch entry for the Best Foreign Language Film at the 69th Academy Awards, but was not accepted as a nominee. It also won the Golden Calf for Best Feature Film. The film was dedicated to chess grandmaster Max Euwe, the grandfather of the director.

== Plot ==
Sara, a young girl with an active imagination, buys a chess set from a friend's father with her pocket money. That friend, Victor, teaches her to play chess with the decorative chess pieces, which come to life in her fantasy in the form of real characters living in a chess world. At the same time, she learns more and more about her father, whom she never knew. Playing chess as well as getting to know her father is not made easy for her. All her mother wants to tell her is that her father lives in South Africa. Her teacher also initially refuses to believe in Sara's possibilities. But when she gets good at playing chess against all odds, she is allowed to join a simultaneous chess exhibition against the famous chess player Bob Hooke. She makes a big impression on him with her chess skills but never gets to finish her game. When Victor becomes ill during the chess game, Sara rushes off to bring him home. In her haste, she forgets her chess pieces. When Bob Hooke goes after her to bring her the set, he discovers that she is his daughter.

== Cast ==
- Tiba Tossijn as Sara
- Monique van de Ven as White Queen
- Derek de Lint as Bob Hooke, Sara's father
- Lisa De Rooy as Susanne de Waal, Sara's mother
- Pieter Lutz as Sara's grandfather
- Maya van den Broecke as Black Queen
- Jack Wouterse as White King
- Serge-Henri Valcke as Black King
- Cas Enklaar as White Bishop
- Harry Piekema as White Horse
- Rudolf Lucieer as Teacher
- Sophia Dijkgraaf as Mariette, Sara's critical classmate
- René Nijman as Victor

== Accolades ==
Accolades received by Flodder
| Year | Award | Category | Recipient(s) | Result | Ref. |
|---|---|---|---|---|---|
| 1996 | Netherlands Film Festival | Golden Calf for Best Director | Esmé Lammers | Nominated | |
| 1996 | Netherlands Film Festival | Golden Calf for Best Feature Film | Laurens Geels; Dick Maas | Won | |
| 1996 | Netherlands Film Festival | Golden Calf for Best Actress | Tiba Tossijn | Nominated | |

== Chess ==
The film includes several chess games, most noteworthy of which is in the finale, with Sara as black in the simultaneous exhibition against Hook. 1.e4 e5 2.Nf3 is played, and then coverage resumes here:

Position: e8 black rook, h8 black king, a7 black pawn, b7 black pawn, c7 black bishop, f7 black queen, g7 black pawn, c6 black pawn, e6 black rook, f6 black knight, h6 black pawn, d5 black pawn, e5 white bishop, f5 white knight, d4 white pawn, f4 white pawn, g4 white pawn, d3 white queen, a2 white pawn, b2 white pawn, h2 white pawn, f1 white rook, g1 white rook, h1 white king

It is the position immediately following an inaccuracy by white (Alexander Alekhine) on move 29 of his C49 game on 11 October 1936 in the Arbeiderspers International Tournament against then World Champion Euwe, who went on to win the tournament on tie-break from Reuben Fine.
Sara reprises Euwe's moves, and Hooke Alekhine's - 29...Bxe5 30.fxe5 Ne4 31.g5 hxg5 32.Nd6 Nf2+ (not optimal; ...Qg6 demonstrably holds the draw) 33.Kg2 at which point Sara leaves the board and never gets to resume the game. In the post-mortem, without Sara present, Hooke indicates how close it was.
Accurate play hereon might be 33...Nxd3 34.Rxf7 (in the real game, Alekhine instead played the drawish 34.Nxf7+?, and after committing a major error on move 42, resigned on move 60) 34...Kg8 35.Rf3 Nf4+ 36.Kf1 Rf8 37.Rxg5 Rg6 38.Rf5 Ne6 39.Rxf8+ Nxf8 40.Nf5 Re6 41.Ra3 a6 42.Rg3 g6 43.b4 with a clear, but not necessarily winning, advantage for white.
There are two games we see in entirety.
First appears a Fool's Mate won by Sara.
The other is a Scandinavian Defense (B01), transposing into a Dunst Opening line, won by Sara in simul over the schoolteacher whose chess is mediocre: 1.e4 d5 (the teacher's face suggests he views this sound opening as incorrect) 2.exd5 Nf6 3.c4 (trying to hang on to the pawn loses too much tempo) c6 4.Qa4 Bd7 5.dxc6? (a blunder; black's developmental edge now is probably enough to win) Nxc6 6.Qb3? (white had instead to develop a piece, e.g. with 6.Nc3 or 6.Be2; white's position is now hopeless) 6...Nd4?! (6...e5 wins decisively) 7.Qc3? (the final error - the last hope of a draw was 7.Qd1) 7...e5 8.f4 Bb4 9.Qd3 Bf5 10.Qg3 Ne4 11.Qxg7 Nc2+ 12.Ke2 (12.Kd1 Nf2+ 13.Ke2 Qd3+ 14.Kxf2 Bc5#) 12...Qd3+ (Mariette, the contemptuous classmate, wrongly equates this most efficient way of winning with her own queen-losing blunder) 13. Kxd3 Nc3#
The movie also features a game fragment from the simul, where Sara's talented but sickly classmate Victor obtains, as black, this equal position against Hooke:

Position: e8 black rook, g8 black king, d7 black queen, f7 black pawn, g7 black bishop, h7 black pawn, a6 black rook, b6 black knight, g6 black pawn, a5 black pawn, c5 black pawn, d5 black pawn, a3 white pawn, c3 white knight, d3 white pawn, f3 white knight, h3 white pawn, c2 white pawn, d2 white queen, f2 white pawn, g2 white pawn, a1 white rook, e1 white rook, g1 white king

Victor plays ...Rxe1+ and Hooke recaptures with the queen. The young player then feels dizzy and, helped by Sara, leaves.

== See also ==
- List of submissions to the 69th Academy Awards for Best Foreign Language Film
- List of Dutch submissions for the Academy Award for Best Foreign Language Film
