= Escort (2006 film) =

2006 film

- DVD cover
- Written by: Frank Ketelaar
- Directed by: Frank Ketelaar
- Starring: Rifka Lodeizen; Bastiaan Ragas; Sabrina van Halderen; Ton Kas; Tom Jansen; Kenan Raven
- Music by: Fons Merkies
- Country of origin: Netherlands
- Original language: Dutch

Production
- Producers: Sandra van der Oest; Jet Smit
- Cinematography: Remco Bakker
- Editor: Sandor Soeteman
- Running time: 90 minutes
- Production company: IDTV

Original release
- Release: 27 May 2006

Escort is a 2006 Dutch thriller television film written and directed by Frank Ketelaar, starring Rifka Lodeizen and Bastiaan Ragas.

== Plot ==
Chantal (Rifka Lodeizen) is a young hairdresser and manicurist who at night escorts rich men for money, but no sex is involved since she has a boyfriend Robin (Bastiaan Ragas) whom she loves very much.

One day, old, lonely and terminally ill millionaire Wessel Jacobsen (Tom Jansen), who has been looking for a companion for the last 6 months he has to live, offers to marry Chantal. After much hesitation, Chantal and Robin decide that the 6 million euro inheritance is too much to ignore. Mr. Jacobsen's sexual depravity makes the marriage difficult, but more difficult for her is the discovery that his cancer is improving.

Mr. Jacobsen finally dies 8 and a half months later. Just when it seems that her and Robin's nightmares are finally over, the old man's estranged son Simon (Kenan Raven) shows up. Simon believes, correctly, that Chantal has murdered his father, and tries to blackmail her.

Simon is murdered at night, and Robin eventually tells Chantal that he did it and that the police will not discover it. They get married in La Palma, Spain, but on the night of their wedding, Chantal is reminded by her best friend Nanouk (Sabrina van Halderen) that Robin might also kill her for the money.

== Awards and nominations ==
- 2006 26th Netherlands Film Festival
  - Won — Golden Calf for Best Television Drama
  - Nominated — Best Screenplay of a Feature Film (Frank Ketelaar)
