= De Luizenmoeder =

- Genre: Comedy
- Created by: Jan Albert de Weerd; Ilse Warringa
- Screenplay by: Eva Aben; Diederik Ebbinge; Ilse Warringa
- Directed by: Jan Albert de Weerd; Diederik Ebbinge; Jelle de Jonge
- Opening theme: "Schooldays" by The Kinks
- Country of origin: Netherlands
- Original language: Dutch
- No. of seasons: 2
- No. of episodes: 18

Production
- Executive producer: Pavel Marik
- Producers: Ingmar Menning; Jan Albert de Weerd
- Running time: 23–25 minutes
- Production companies: Bing Film & TV

Original release
- Network: AVROTROS (NPO 3)
- Release: 14 January 2018

De Luizenmoeder (literally: "The Lice Mother") is a Dutch comedy series broadcast by AVROTROS on NPO 3. The series is about an elementary school, called "De Klimop", its teachers, its principal, and the parents of its first grade (group 3) students. The first season, which consisted of nine episodes, aired weekly on Sundays between 14 January and 11 March 2018. The season was followed by a special, that included bloopers and deleted scenes. The series became an unexpected success, reaching record-breaking ratings and receiving awards. The series was renewed for a second season on 5 February 2018 and premiered on 10 February 2019. Belgian production company Lecter Media bought the rights to make a Belgian version directed by Maarten Moerkerke, which was broadcast on VTM starting in January 2019.

The series was created by Jan Albert de Weerd and Ilse Warringa, who also is one of the actors. Filming began on 5 October 2017 at a former elementary school in Mijdrecht, called "Twistvliedschool". It was produced by Ingmar Menning and De Weerd of the production company Bing Film & TV. De Weerd also directed the first season of De Luizenmoeder. Season two was directed by Diederik Ebbinge (also one of the actors) and Jelle de Jonge.

== Cast and characters ==
- Jennifer Hoffman as Hannah – Hannah is the mother of Floor, a new student at the school. She is a developmental psychologist, who just got divorced.
- Diederik Ebbinge as Anton – Anton is the principal of "De Klimop".
- Bianca Krijgsman as Nancy – Nancy's children don't attend the school anymore, but she now helps as a volunteer.
- Henry van Loon as Volkert – Volkert is the school's janitor. He is a veteran suffering from PTSD.
- Vincent Rietveld as Pjotr-Jan – Pjotr-Jan leads the parent organization the school is part of.
- Ilse Warringa as Ank – Ank is a first grade teacher at the school. She has dyscalculia and likes to sing songs for her students.
- Leny Breederveld as Helma – Helma is a fifth grade teacher at the school, she is two years away from retirement.
- Rop Verheijen as Walter – Walter is one of Rianne's adoptive fathers. He's married to Kenneth.
- André Dongelmans as Kenneth – Kenneth is Rianne's other adoptive father.
- Rian Gerritsen as Kim – Kim is Youandi's mother. She is friends with Mel.
- Meral Polat as Mel – Mel is Shanaya's mother.
- Arnoud Bos as Karel – Karel is the father of Maledief/Maledieve and Philippien.
- Maaike Martens as Ursula – Ursula is the mother of Isa.
- Dunya Khayame as Esma – Esma is Achmed's mother and was introduced in the second season.
- Walid Benmbarek as Amir – Amir is Achmed's father and was introduced in season two as well.

== Episodes ==
=== Season 1 ===
| No. in season | Title | Original release date | NL viewers (millions) | NL viewers including online (millions) |
|---|---|---|---|---|
| 1 | "Het zijn altijd de nieuwkomers" | 14 January 2018 | 0.744 | 1.594 |
| 2 | "Afspraak is afspraak" | 21 January 2018 | 1.400 | 2.607 |
| 3 | "Er zijn er twee jarig, hoera hoera" | 28 January 2018 | 2.435 | 3.845 |
| 4 | "Laat ze maar glanzen" | 4 February 2018 | 3.489 | 4.745 |
| 5 | "Winterklaas" | 11 February 2018 | 3.357 | 4.444 |
| 6 | "Lentekriebels" | 18 February 2018 | 3.225 | 4.123 |
| 7 | "Een helder licht" | 25 February 2018 | 3.133 | 4.100 |
| 8 | "Kanjertraining" | 4 March 2018 | 3.307 | 4.124 |
| 9 | "Send in the clowns" | 11 March 2018 | 3.171 | 3.933 |
| – | "De Luizenmoeder Special" | 18 March 2018 | 2.577 | 3.056 |

=== Season 2 ===
| No. in season | Title | Original release date | NL viewers (millions) | NL viewers including online (millions) |
|---|---|---|---|---|
| 1 | "Safety first" | 10 February 2019 | 3.965 | 5.108 |
| 2 | "Gezien als Meisje" | 17 February 2019 | 4.176 | 5.015 |
| 3 | "Fons de Poel" | 24 February 2019 | 3.541 | 4.457 |
| 4 | "Jezus in je Hart" | 3 March 2019 | 3.094 | 4.075 |
| 5 | "Genocide-hoed" | 10 March 2019 | 2.975 | 3.808 |
| 6 | "Korte Rondjes" | 17 March 2019 | 2.833 | 3.589 |
| 7 | "Witte Puntjes" | 24 March 2019 | 2.163 | 2.934 |
| 8 | "Harakiri" | 31 March 2019 | 2.484 | 3.251 |
| 9 | "Lievelingsjuf" | 7 April 2019 | 2.651 | 3.458 |

== Reception ==
De Luizenmoeder became a success unexpectedly. It was hailed for its recognizability and its politically incorrect jokes about, for example, Zwarte Piet and gay parents. The first episode was seen live (and online the same day) by about 750,000 people, but another 850,000 people watched the episode online in the following six days. Its ratings quickly rose and peaked at episode 4, "Laat ze maar glanzen", which had almost 3.5 million live views and almost 4.75 million including online watching. Six out of the nine first-season episodes were the best watched television programs on Dutch television of the week (online watching included). De Luizenmoeder broke several records: never before was a television show watched online so many times in the Netherlands, and it was the program with the highest ratings on NPO 3 since a new measurement method was introduced in 2008.

Several parodies of the song "Hallo allemaal" ("Hello Everybody"), which is repeatedly sung by teacher Ank (Ilse Warringa), were created. One version was sung by comedian André van Duin, and multiple versions were created for the festival Carnival.

De Luizenmoeder received the Zilveren Nipkowschijf, a Dutch television award, in June 2018. Besides, actress Ilse Warringa was awarded the Golden Calf for Best Actress in a Television Drama in October 2018 for her role in the series as Ank. That same month, Warringa won the Silver Television Star during the Golden Televizier-Ring Gala for her role in the series. De Luizenmoeder was also nominated for the Golden Televizier Ring, but it did not win the award.

== Film ==
A film sequel was announced in February 2020. It was theatrically released in July 2021. The film depicts Ank, Helma, Hannah and Nancy trying to keep the school running during the COVID-19 pandemic after principal Anton's death. A new interim principal and his plans to digitalise education cause tension among the teachers and students.

Returning cast member Ilse Warringa made her directorial debut. The cast from the series reprised their roles (except for Diederik Ebbinge, Henry van Loon and Vincent Rietveld).

New roles include:

- Aiko Beemsterboer as Lieke, a young teacher in training, who is hired by Thomas to support Ank with teaching.
- Dragan Bakema as Thomas, the new interim principal who plans to digitalise education at De Klimop.
- Beppie Melissen as Janny, an ER trainer who gives a training to Ank, Nancy, Helma and Hannah.
- Mirjam Stolwijk as Sarina, Bradley's foster mother.
- Korneel Evers as Jordy, Kim's partner.
- Dinand Warringa as Ronald, a member of the school board.

The students are more prominent in the film than in the series. They are mostly portrayed by extras. A few students who had a minor role in the series are portrayed by the same cast: Danila Dadochkin, Pei-Fang Hu Romein, Sharai Troostwijk, Aleyna Sari, Rosanne Huijsman, Jasmijn Kien, Anoek Godthelp and Quail Mehraz.

The film was also broadcast on NPO 3 on 27 April 2022.
