= One Night Stand (Dutch TV series) =

Anthology series for TV

- Genre: Anthology
- Directed by: various
- Country of origin: Netherlands
- Original language: Dutch
- No. of seasons: 14

Original release
- Network: VPRO
- Release: 2004 – 2019

One Night Stand is a Dutch anthology series that ran from 2004 till 2019 and was broadcast by the VPRO. Every episode was produced by a different production company and directed by a different director. Some of the directors made their film debut in this series, like Urszula Antoniak, Boudewijn Koole and Jaap van Heusden.

== Prizes ==
The series managed to win a lot of Golden Calves through the years. Six times they won the Golden Calf for Best Television Drama for the episodes: Den Helder in 2008, Anvers in 2009, Finnemans in 2010, Vast in 2011, Geen koningen in ons bloed in 2015 and Horizon in 2016.

The series also managed to win five Golden Calves in the Television Drama acting-categories for Loes Schnepper, Ariane Schluter, Jonas Smulders, Nazmiye Oral and a combined award for George Tobal and Majd Mardo.
