= Bodem =

Bodem is a surname. Notable people with the surname include:

- Anton Bodem (1925–2007), German Catholic theologian and Salesian
- Beverly A. Bodem (born 1940), American politician
