= Tiramisu (2008 film) =

- Theatrical release poster
- Directed by: Paula van der Oest
- Written by: Paula van der Oest
- Produced by: Jeroen Beker
- Starring: Anneke Blok; Jacob Derwig
- Cinematography: Rémi Mestre
- Edited by: Sander Vos
- Music by: Aurélien Jouve; Franck Sforza
- Production companies: Motel Films; VARA
- Distributed by: A-Film Distribution
- Release date: 6 March 2008
- Running time: 1h 30min
- Country: Netherlands
- Language: Dutch

Tiramisu is a 2008 Dutch drama film directed by Paula van der Oest.

== Plot ==
When actress Anne (Anneke Blok) finds out that her financial affairs are in a mess she realizes that she has to sell her houseboat.

== Cast ==
- Anneke Blok as Anne
- Jacob Derwig as Jacob
- Gijs Scholten van Aschat as Lex
- Sylvia Hoeks as Vanessa
- Olga Zuiderhoek as Nettie
- Bert Geurkink as Bert
- Laura de Boer as Luna

== Release ==
The film was released on DVD on 20 November 2008 by A-Film Home Entertainment.
