= Ilse Warringa =

Dutch voice actress

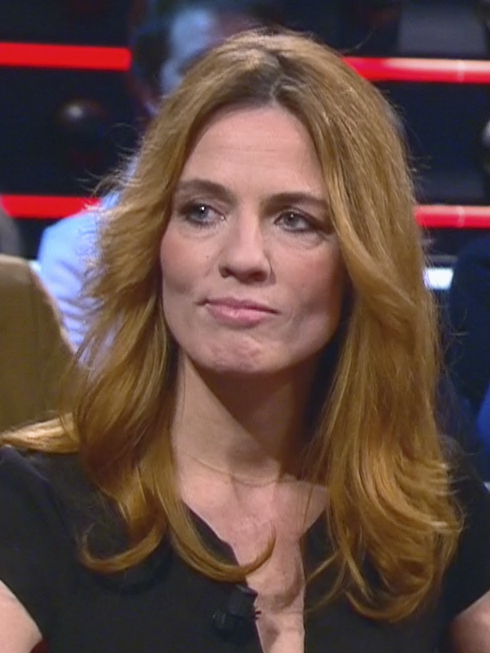
- Warringa (2018)
- Born: June 1, 1975 (age 51); Dalfsen, Netherlands
- Occupation: (Voice) Actress

Ilse Warringa (born June 1, 1975) is a Dutch actress and voice actress who has voiced for Dutch dubs of cartoons for Nickelodeon, SDI Media and Wim Pel Productions.

== Biography ==
Ilse was born on June 1, 1975, in Dalfsen and attended the Academy of Arts in Kampen/Zwolle for stage training, where she graduated as a drama teacher in 1998. She also studied vocals and music at the Conservatory in Zwolle.

Directly after her graduation, she came into contact with Theatre Group Stella Den Haag from 1998 to date, where she acted in the plays The Year of the Hare (2003, winner 1000 Watt-Prize), In the Nests in collaboration with the Residentie Orchestra (2007 and 2010, conducted by Jurjen Hempel),as well as the successful Shaffy for Children (2010). Additionally, she performed in a wide variety of productions at several music-theatre groups such as Het Filiaal theatermakers, Theatergroep Wederzijds, Theater Sonnevanck, and Oorkaan. Warringa joined the Winx Club cast in 2006, voicing the character Icy in season 3, 5, and 6.

She is a creator of the television series De Luizenmoeder, of which its first season aired in 2018. She played the character Ank in the series, acting as both screenwriter and actor. Her most recent television project, Football Parents, was released in May of 2025 on the streaming platform Netflix. Season One of the comedy series was created and written by Warringa, and she is featured on the show as the character Marenka. The show was popular among Dutch audiences, staying for seven weeks on Netflix’s “Dutch Top 10”. The series has been renewed for a second season.

== Filmography ==
- Various roles in sketches of Het Klokhuis
- Sissi (Dutch remake) - Néné and Mother of Franz Joseph
- Juf Ank in Dutch series De Luizenmoeder

=== Dubbing ===
==== Animation ====
- Winx Club - Icy (Seasons 3, 5-6)
- Winx Club: The Secret of the Lost Kingdom - Icy
- Winx Club 3D: Magical Adventure - Icy
- Kung Fu Panda - Tiger
- Marting Morning - Titelsinger

==== Live action ====
- iCarly - Ms Briggs

=== Tv-commercials ===
- Rabobank
- LOI
- De Meisjes van Verkade

== Links ==
- Ilse Warringa at IMDb
- Ilse Warringa on Twitter
