= Based on the Novel =

1999 film by Eddy Terstall

- Theatrical release poster
- Directed by: Eddy Terstall
- Written by: Eddy Terstall
- Produced by: Wim Louwrier
- Cinematography: Willem Nagtglas
- Edited by: Rinze Schuurman
- Distributed by: RCV Film Distribution
- Release date: 12 May 1999
- Running time: 88 minutes
- Country: Netherlands
- Language: Dutch

Based on the Novel (Dutch title: De boekverfilming) is a Dutch drama film from 1999 directed by Eddy Terstall. The film features several Dutch celebrities in cameo appearances. The film was shown at the Hong Kong film festival.

== Story ==
After his debut film, which received a Golden Calf, director Lars Schumann Jr. II bases his second film on the novel "Op Kousevoeten" by writer Iris de Koning. Together with casting director Bob Kop, his assistant Jennifer and the producer, the young filmmaker is looking for the suitable actress for the leading role in the book adaptation. After a quick selection, three actresses (Noor, Sofie and Julia) remain competing for the leading role of the Jewish woman.

Noor, chased by a stalker, presents herself as an unstable woman who, despite her uncertain character, has no trouble getting out of her clothes. Noor does not make herself popular during the casting while crying, but unlike his crewmates, Lars certainly sees a Jewish woman in the Asian-looking karateka who, without resistance, allows herself to be indulged in everything. Noor accepts all of Lars' comments as sincere compliments, while her therapist abuses her insecurity to enjoy her magnificent body. Lars wants to keep control of Noor by putting his relative Boris forward as a lawyer, but the scrapper in the making doesn't want to file a complaint against the confidant who is only allowed to treat her psychologically.

Sofie, married to the demanding Harm, maintains a secret affair with his housemate André, who in turn has a relationship with the journalist who brings the book and the film "Op Kousevoeten" to the attention of the television and makes a fuss with the agent to whom Noor does not want to file a complaint of sexual abuse. Sofie and André agree that they should approve each other's fleeting partners for actual action, whereby the wonderful actress in the making outside her education at the film academy discovers that real life relationships may be even more complex than a film scenario can describe.

Waitress Julia has a romance with Moroccan bus driver Mo, who hopes for the consent of his father, mother and sister on the one hand and drastically wants to curb his nephew on the other hand. Julia enters a probationary period in which she wants to both give her intercultural relationship a chance and see for herself how she thinks about the troubles in which love can result. Julia's best friend Oscar and best friend Mina help her to develop an idea about real life, but the leading role in Lars' new film requires different qualities.

For Lars, casting doesn't stop at the actual audition, but under the guise of "work meetings" during dinners with the actresses, the director is constantly trying to convince the girls to undress. Noor, Julia and Sofie each respond in their own way to Lars' rather personal approach of selecting the appropriate actress for the female leading role.

== Cast ==
- Dirk Zeelenberg as Lars Schumann jr II
- Nadja Hüpscher as Noor
- Femke Lakerveld as Sofie
- Alette Dirkse Julia
- Najib Amhali as Mo
- Ivor Kortenbach as André
- Job Gosschalk as Bob Kop
- Eugénie Schellen as Iris de Koning
- Lucretia van der Vloot as Mina
- Matthijs van Heijningen as Producent
- Dieuwertje Blok as Journaliste
- Rifka Lodeizen as Agente
- Dennis Smitter as Agent
- Fedja van Huêt as Boris Schumann
