= Anneke Blok =

Dutch actress (born 1959)

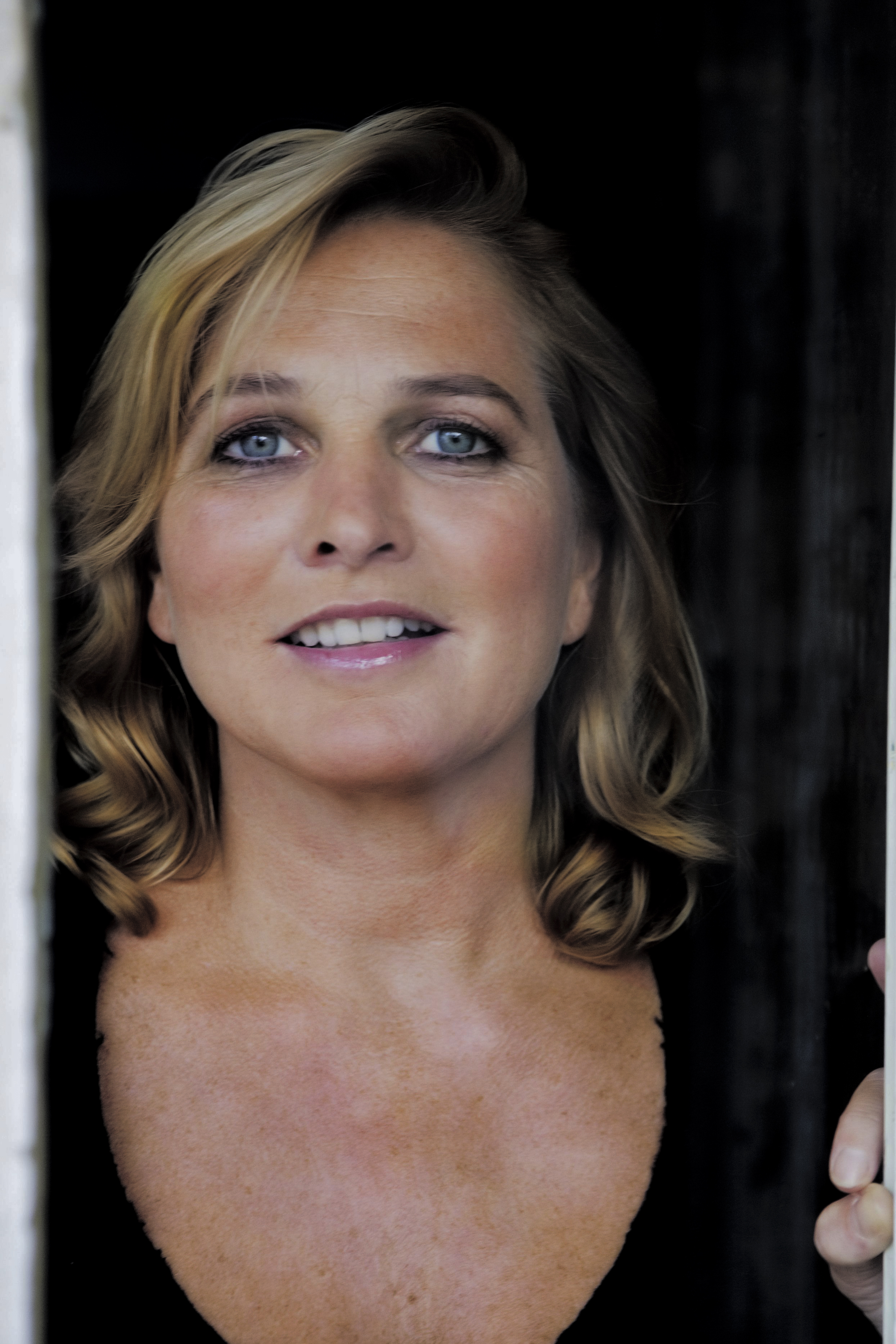
- Blok in 2007
- Born: 24 December 1959 (age 66); Rheden, Netherlands
- Occupation: Actress
- Years active: 1989-present

Anneke Blok (born 24 December 1959) is a Dutch actress. She won the 2008 Golden Calf for Best Actress award for her performance as Anne in Tiramisu.

== Selected filmography ==
Year	Title	Role	Notes
1990	Vigour	Roos	
1996	Another Mother		
1997	Freemarket		
1999	Man, Vrouw, Hondje	Anna de Haas	
2001	Family		
2003	Sea of Silence	Tante Connie	
2005	Winky's Horse	Juf Sigrid	
2006	Keep Off	Jordi's Mother	
2007	Where Is Winky's Horse?	Juf Sigrid	
2007	Alles is Liefde	Simone Coelman	
2008	Winter in Wartime	Moeder van Beusekom	
2008	Tiramisu	Anne	
2013	Soof	Hansje	
2016	The Fury	Grandmother	
2018	Open Seas	Moeder Philip	
2022	Silverstar	Jenny	
2022	Moloch	Elske	
