= Nadja Hüpscher =

Dutch actress and writer (born 1972)

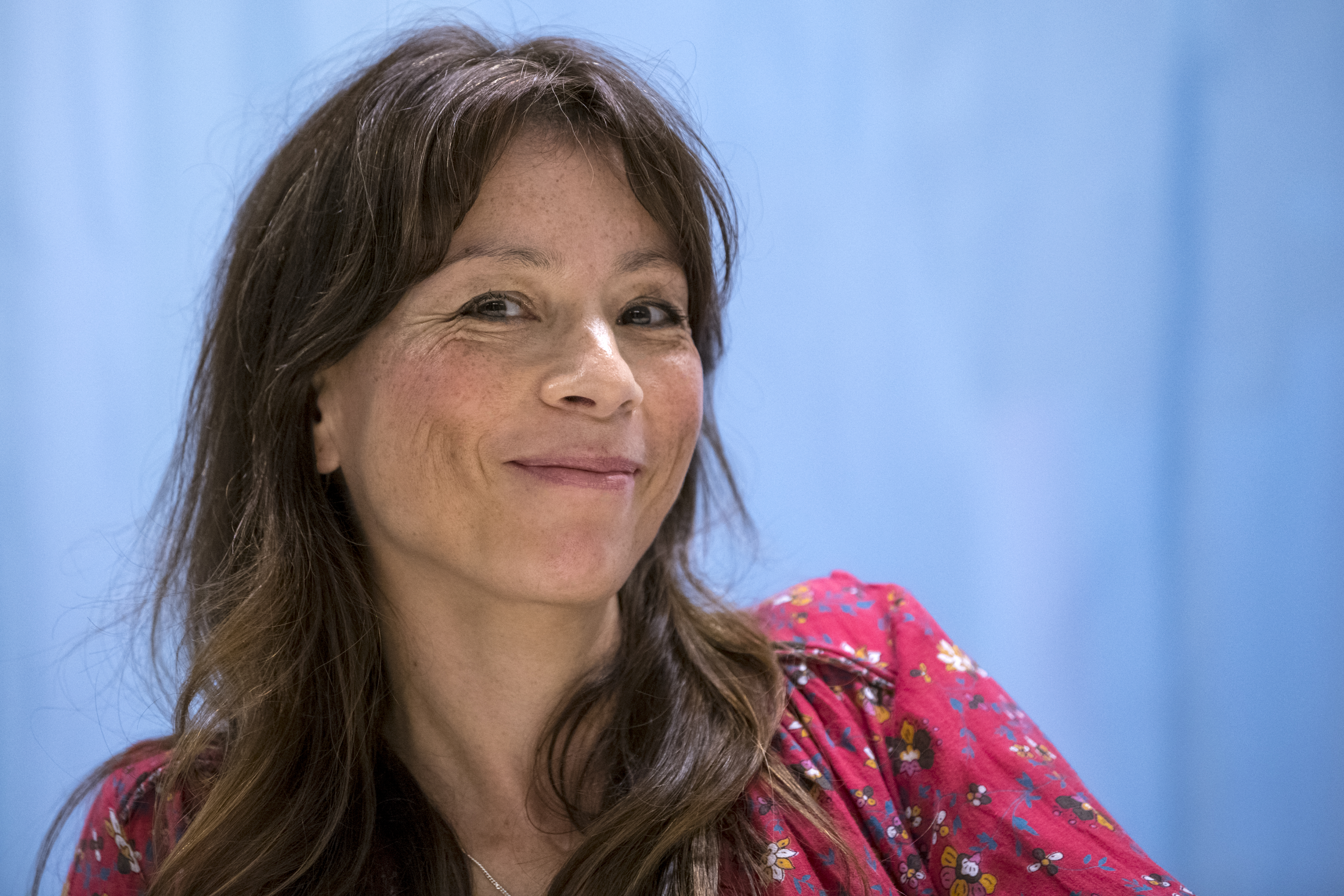
- Born: 23 March 1972 (age 54); Nijmegen, Netherlands
- Occupations: Actress, writer
- Awards: Golden Calf for Best Actress 1999 Based on the Novel

Nadja Hüpscher (born 23 March 1972) is a Dutch actress and writer, known for Based on the Novel (1999), Dennis P. (2007) and Levenslied (2011).

== Early life ==
Nadja Hüpscher was born on 23 March 1972 in Nijmegen, Gelderland, Netherlands.

Hüpscher studied Cultural Management at the Amsterdam School of the Arts and also did amateur theatre at the time.

== Career ==
In 1999, she won the Golden Calf for Best Actress award for her role as Noor in Based on the Novel directed by Eddy Terstall. In 2001, she appeared in the film Costa! directed by Johan Nijenhuis and in 2004, she appeared in the film Simon directed by Eddy Terstall. Where she portrayed the character of Rosalie. Another notable film in which she appeared is "Alles is Liefde" (2007), a romantic comedy where she played the role of Kim.

In 2007, she participated in the popular television show Wie is de Mol?. In 2020, she appeared in a special anniversary edition of the show, called Wie is de Mol? Renaissance, which featured only contestants of previous seasons. Nadja published her first book in 2014, IN THE WILD, CONVERSATIONS OF THE STREET, with Atlas Contact. She writes columns and articles for several magazines. She finished her studies at the Scriptacademy in 2018. Nadja Hüpscher has also been an ambassador for the Helen Dowling Institute since 2021.

== Filmography ==
In recent years, Hüpscher has continued to appear in commercially successful Dutch films. In 2024, she featured in the romantic comedy "Verliefd op Bali" (Loving Bali) which achieved Golden status after surpassing 100,000 cinema admissions in the Netherlands and later gained popularity on streaming platforms. Dutch media noted the film’s strong box-office performance and its broad audience reach, marking Hüpscher’s return to a prominent supporting role in mainstream cinema.

=== As actress ===
Filmography
Year	Title	Role	Remarks
Movies
1996	Hufters & ladies-in-waiting	Susan	
1998	Babylon	Lena	
	Framed		
1999	The book movie	Norwegian Green	
2000	Rent-a-Friend	Françoise	
	Good deeds in daylight: On the way	Helen	television movie
	Night in the city	Sylvia	television movie
2001	Ruled out	Marian	television movie
	Costa!	Joyce	
2002	Déjà Vu	femme fatale	
	Polonaise	Robin	television movie
2003	The Order	Lisa	television movie
2004	Simon	Joy	
2005	garden of Eden	Eve	Dutch short film
2006	The disappointment	Connie	television movie
2007	Alles is Liefde	Kim	Movie
2007	Reorganization of the Franeker Relocation Department		
	The moment of truth		
	Ernst, Bobbie and the crafty Onix	Suzy	
	Dennis P .	Tiffany	
	Sextet	Suus	
2015	Yes I do!	Saskia	
2019	The libya	lecturer	
2024	Loving Bali	Cornelie	
Television
1999	Baantjer : De Cock and the murder by instinct	Tamara de Wall	guest star
2001	The actors	Ellie	
2002	Trauma 24/7	Masha Jacobs	
2004	The Department	Eve	
2007	Who is the mole?	herself	
2011	Life song	Madee Aipurri	
2013	Life song	Madee Aipurri	
2015	On the way to Pakjesavond	Frederick	
2016	Mouna's Kitchen	Babette	
	Good times Bad Times	Elise Kill	15 Episodes
2017	Brussels	Marie	
	BABS	Nini	
2020	Who is the mole?	herself	anniversary edition
2022	Scrooge Live	Mrs. Swindlebitch	
2025	Dit Was Het Nieuws	Guest host	Dutch TV satire show
Theater
1998	Fur nipples		
1999	Confusions		
2000	The name		
	Kasimir & Caroline		
2001	The interrogation		
2002	Wina sings		
2003	The name		
2005	Shakespeare Project		
2007	Blood Tie ( Orkater )		
2010	PIMP		
	Annoying ( Bird Factory )		
2013	Old Peanuts ( Rudolphi Productions )		

=== As contestant ===
- 2007: Wie is de Mol?
- 2020: Wie is de Mol? Renaissance (anniversary season)
