= Rudolf Lucieer =

Dutch actor (born 1942)

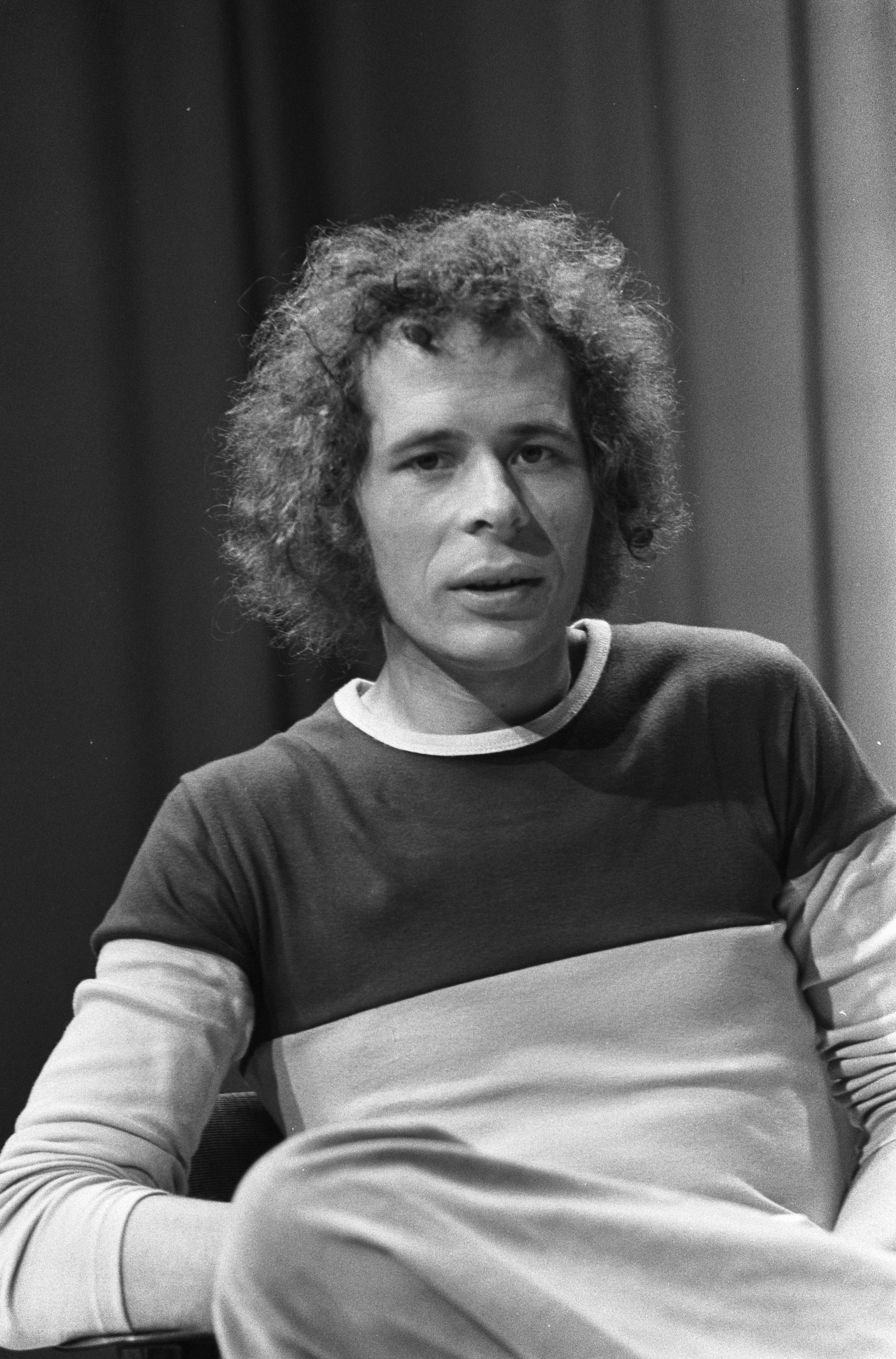
- Rudolf Lucieer (1974)
- Born: 10 November 1942 (age 83); Haarlem, Netherlands
- Occupation: Actor
- Years active: 1966-present

Rudolf Lucieer (born 10 November 1942) is a Dutch actor. He has appeared in 36 films and television shows since 1966. He starred in the 1967 film Paranoia, which was entered into the 17th Berlin International Film Festival. In 1992 he won the Golden Calf for Best Actor for his role in the movie The Northerners.

== Selected filmography ==
- Paranoia (1967)
- Lifespan (1976)
- The Province (1991)
- The Northerners (1992)
- Long Live the Queen (1995)
- The Dress (1996)
- Marrakech (1996)
- De Trein van zes uur tien (1999)
- Süskind (2012)
