= Will van Kralingen =

Dutch actress (1951–2012)

Will van Kralingen (1 October 1951 in Nijmegen – 9 November 2012 in Amsterdam) was a Dutch actress whose starring credits included Havinck in 1987 and Temmink: The Ultimate Fight in 1998. Kralingen also appeared in Dutch television series, including De Zomer van '45, Het jaar van de Opvolging, and Het Wassende Water. Her most recent television roles were Hartslag and Flikken Maastricht.

Will van Kralingen received two Golden Calf awards for her roles in Havinck and Storm in mijn Hoofd. She later won a Theo d'Or for best dramatic actress in 2007.

She then dubbed Moses's foster mother, Tuya, in the Dutch version of the 1998 animated feature, The Prince of Egypt.

Her last film was De Goede Dood, filmed in 2011 and released in February 2012.

Will van Kralingen died from cancer at Antoni van Leeuwenhoek hospital in Amsterdam on November 9, 2012, at the age of 61.
