= Jack Wouterse =

Dutch actor (born 1957)

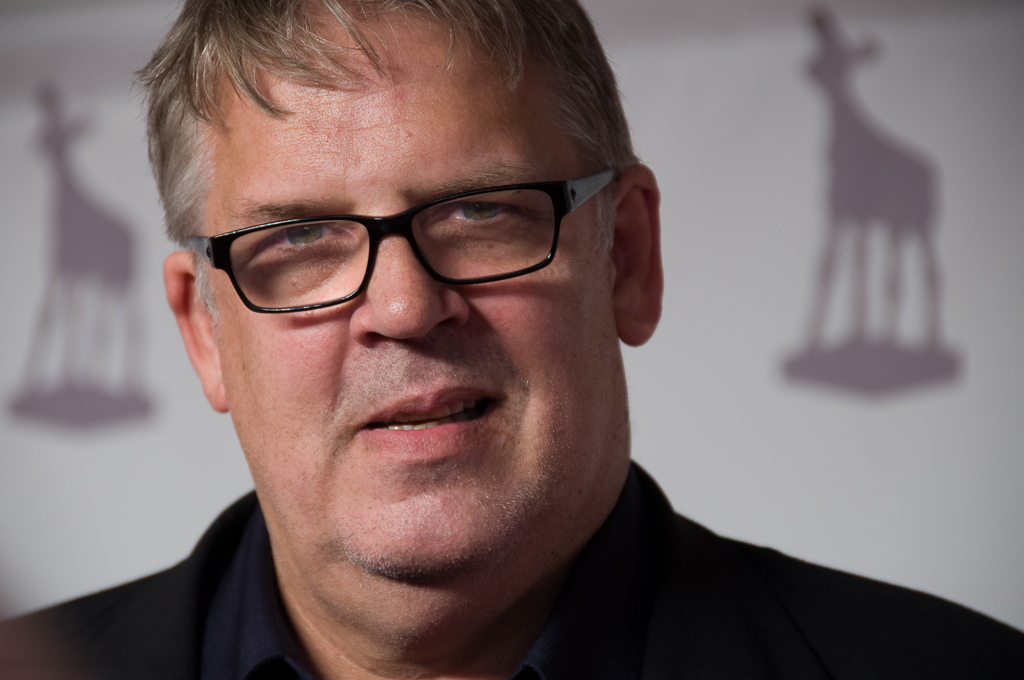
- Wouterse in 2011
- Born: 17 June 1957 (age 69); Soest, Netherlands
- Occupation: Actor

Jack Wouterse (born 17 June 1957 in Soest) is a Dutch actor. His career as a movie actor took off with his role in the 1992 film The Northerners, directed by Alex van Warmerdam. Wouterse made his international debut in an episode of the TV series Band of Brothers. He frequently worked with murdered Dutch director Theo van Gogh.

== Film ==
- Redbad (2018) - Willibrord.
- Kapitein Rob en het Geheim van Professor Lupardi (2007) - General.
- For a few marbles more (Voor een paar knikkers meer) (2006) – Father of Sofie (voice)
- Kameleon 2 (2005) – Piet Haan
- Too Fat Too Furious (Vet Hard) (2005) - Bennie
- 06/05 (2004) - Van Dam
- Tow Truck Pluck (2004) - Father of Stamper
- Pietje Bell 2: De Jacht op de Tsarenkroon (2003) - Klok
- The Tulse Luper Suitcases, Episode 3: Antwerp (2003) - Erik van Hoyten
- The Tulse Luper Suitcases: The Moab Story (2003) - Erik van Hoyten
- Het wonder van Maxima (2003)
- Julie en Herman (2003) - Herman van Putten
- Peter Bell (Pietje Bell) (2002) - Klok
- Miss Minoes (2001) - Van Weezel
- Magonia (2001) - Ramsey Nasser
- With great joy (Met grote blijdschap) (2001)- Ad Sipkes
- Baby Blue (2001) - Fiducia
- Zoenzucht (2000)
- Little Crumb (Kruimeltje) (1999) - visitor of Mrs. Koster
- Suzy Q (1999) - Ko, father of Suzy
- Enigma (1999) - Max
- Culluliod blues (1998) - Sjef
- Temmink: The Ultimate Fight (1998) - Temmink
- Een echte hond (1998) - father of Jan
- De Pijnbank (1998) - Peter de Bock
- Chez André (1997)
- In het belang van de staat (1997)
- De Wolkenfabriek (1997)
- Dying to Go Home (1996) - Max
- The Boy Who Stopped Talking (1996) - Zwart
- De Jurk (1996)
- The Shadow Walkers (1995) - man with suitcase
- Eenmaal geslagen, nooit meer bewogen (1995) - Charles
- Lang Leve de Koningin (1995) - the white king
- The Dead Man 2: Return of the Dead Man (1994)
- En Route (1993) - Lou
- Angie (1993)
- The Three Best Things in Life (1993) - Maarten
- De Noorderlingen / The Northerners (1992) - Jacob
- Op Afbetaling (1992) - Pees
- De Bunker (1992) - Ritter
- De onfatsoenlijk vrouw (1991) - man with tattoo

== TV-series and cartoons ==
- Modern Love Amsterdam (2022) - Chris Zwerver
- Grijpstra & De Gier (2004-) - Henk Grijpstra
- Najib en Julia (2002) - Albert Ruisbroek
- Band of Brothers (2001) - Dutch Farmer
- All Stars - De serie, (1999–2001) - chairman
- Bed & Breakfast (1997) - Dirk
- Mus (1993) - ex-husband woman next door
- Uit de school geklapt (1993) snackbarhouder Sjors
- Super Robot Monkey Team Hyperforce Go! (2005) voice of Otto
- De Legende van Tarzan, De Serie (2001) voice of Tantor

== Awards and nominations ==
- 1994 - Golden calf - Best Actor for En route
- 1999 - Golden calf - Best actor for Suzy Q
- 2001 - Golden FIPA - Best actor for Suzy Q
