= Jacob Derwig =

Dutch actor (born 1969)

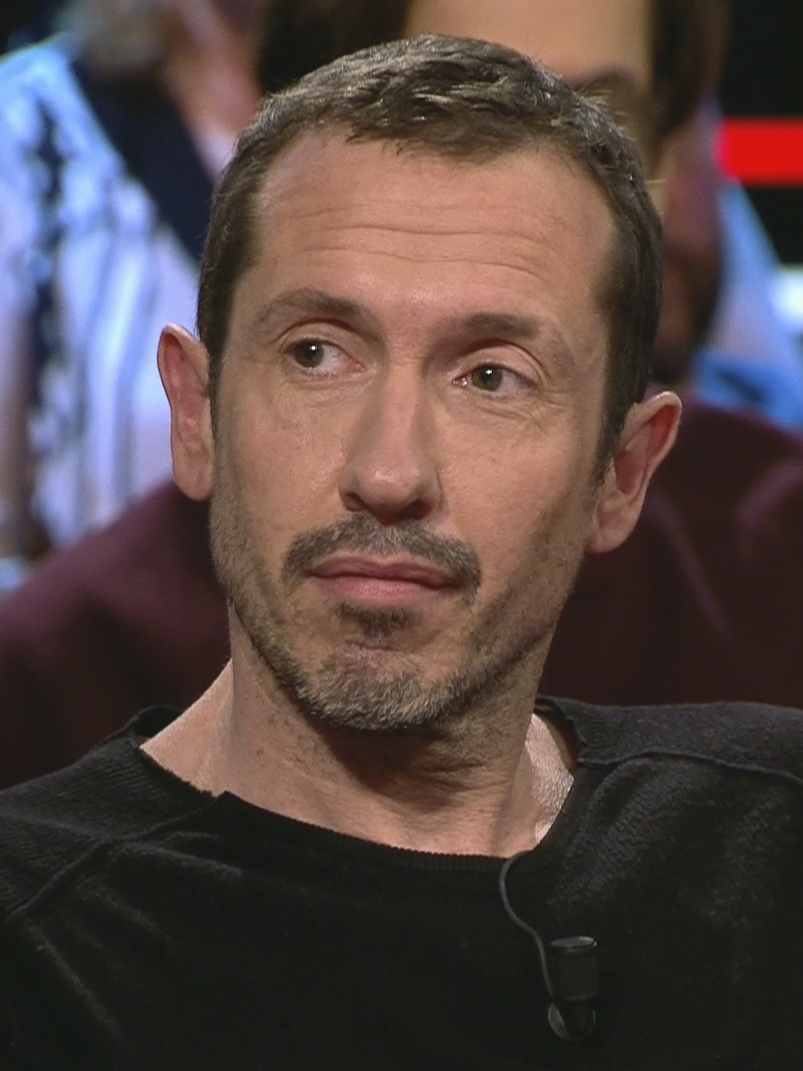
- Derwig in 2018
- Born: 15 July 1969 (age 56); The Hague, Netherlands
- Occupation: Actor
- Years active: 1990 – present
- Awards: Best actor – Golden Calf; 2002 Zus & Zo

Jacob Derwig (The Hague, 15 July 1969) is a Dutch actor.

== Film and television ==
Derwig played roles in box-office hit Family Way (2012) (for which he won a Golden Calf); The Dinner (2013); Public Works (2015); in the highly popular Dutch crime-series Penoza (2015), directed by Diederik van Rooijen; and as Marius Milner in Klem (2016). Derwig starred in the 2022 television series The Terrible Eighties.

== Private life ==
Derwig is married to actress and screenwriter Kim van Kooten, with whom he has two children, Roman and Kee Molly (born 17 December 2007). They met on the set of the TV-series De acteurs (The actors), where various actors played different roles written by Van Kooten.

== Filmography ==
=== Television series ===
- All Stars episode "Paard van Troje" (1999)
- Bij ons in de Jordaan (2000)
- De acteurs (2001)
- The Enclave (2002)
- Offers (2005)
- In Therapie (2010 - 2011)
- The Spectacular (2021)
- Máxima (2024)
- Amsterdam Empire (2025), Love Goes Up in Smoke! (Netflix)

=== Films ===
- Coma (1994)
- The Dress (1996)
- Temmink: The Ultimate Fight (1998)
- Leak (2000)
- Îles flottantes (2001)
- Zus & Zo (2001)
- Grimm (2003)
- Tiramisu (2008)
- Family Way (2012)
- The Dinner (2013)
- Public Works (2016)
- The Resistance Banker (2018)
- Klem (2023)

=== As contestant ===
- De slimste mens (2021-2022)
