= Bij ons in de Jordaan =

- Genre: Biography
- Directed by: Willem van de Sande Bakhuyzen
- Country of origin: Netherlands
- Original language: Dutch
- No. of episodes: 3

Original release
- Network: VPRO

Bij ons in de Jordaan is a 2000 Dutch television series directed by Willem van de Sande Bakhuyzen, a biography of the singer Johnny Jordaan.

The series was based on the biography Bij ons schijnt de zon by Bert Hiddema, and consisted of three 50-minute episodes. It won two Golden Calf awards, for best actor and best director in a drama show.

It was released on DVD in 2009.

== Cast ==
- Kees Prins - Johnny Jordaan
- Pierre Bokma - Willy Alberti
- Jeroen Willems - Wim Sonneveld
- Jacob Derwig - Young Arie
- John Leddy - Old Arie
- Marieke Heebink - Totty
- Ricky Koole - Karin
- Kees Hulst - Karin's father
- Marlies Heuer - Karin's mother
- Cecile Heuer - Johnny Jordaan's mother
- Helmert Woudenberg - Ome Nijs
