= Sander Vos =

Dutch film editor

- Born: 31 January 1967 (age 58); Utrecht, Netherlands
- Occupation: Film editor

Sander Vos (born 31 January 1967) is a Dutch film editor.

== Career ==
Vos won the Golden Calf for Best Montage award four times at the Netherlands Film Festival for the following films: Paradise Now (2005), Black Butterflies (2011), Full Contact (2015, awarded in 2016) and Tonio (2016, awarded in 2017).

Vos also edited the film De tranen van Maria Machita (1991) which won the Tuschinski Award as well as the Golden Calf for Best Short Film award at the 1991 Netherlands Film Festival. Other films that Vos edited include Goodbye (1995), Zus & Zo (2001), Winky's Horse (2005) and Tiramisu (2008) as well as the 2008 documentary Beyond the Game.

== Awards ==
- 2005: Golden Calf for Best Montage, Paradise Now
- 2011: Golden Calf for Best Montage, Black Butterflies
- 2016: Golden Calf for Best Montage, Full Contact
- 2017: Golden Calf for Best Montage, Tonio
