= Paula van der Oest =

Dutch film director and screenwriter

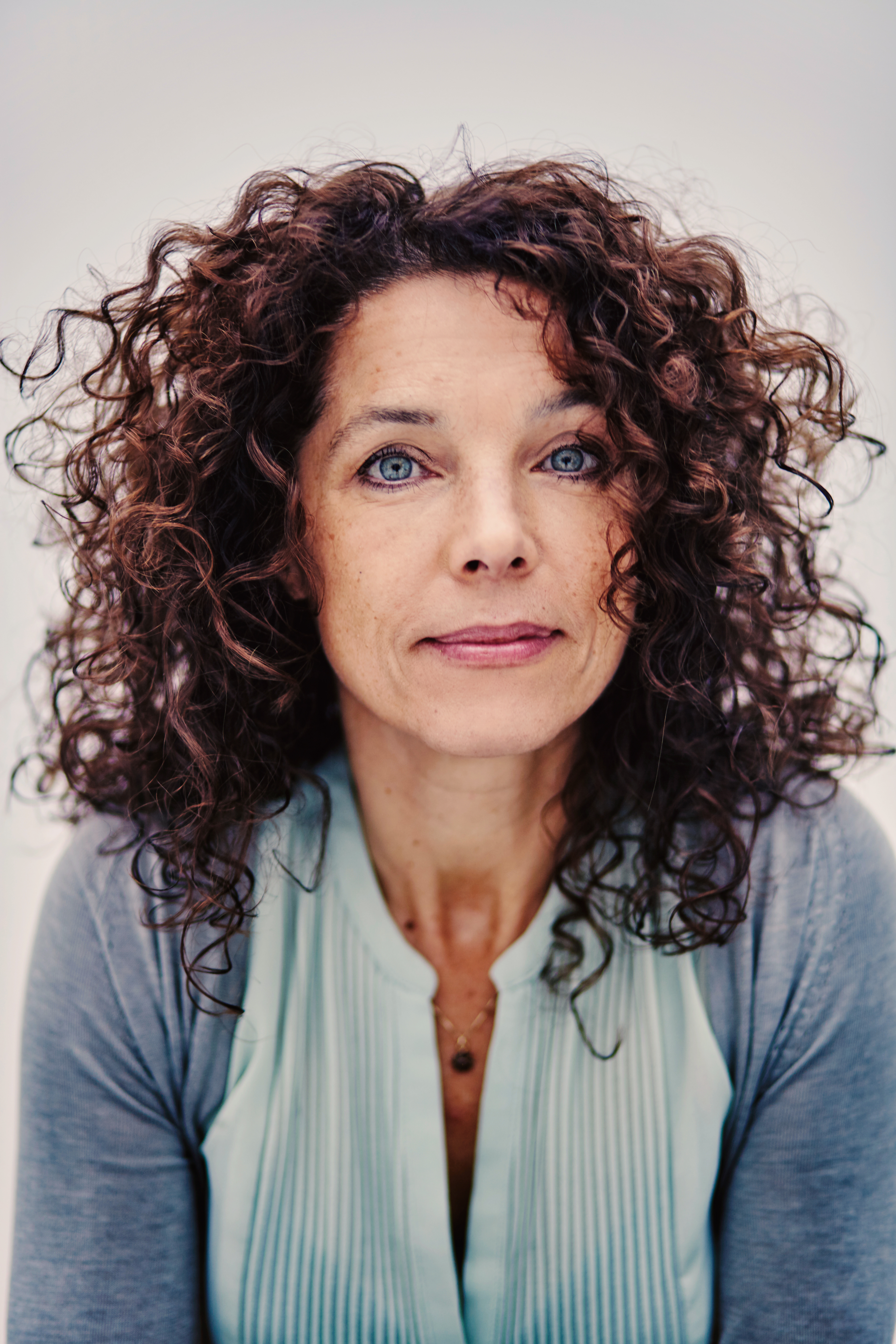
- Born: 1965 (age 60–61); Laag-Soeren, Gelderland, Netherlands
- Occupations: Film director, screenwriter
- Years active: 1988-present

Paula van der Oest (born 1965) is a Dutch film director and screenwriter. Her 2001 film Zus & Zo was nominated for the Academy Award for Best Foreign Language Film.

== Career ==
With her final exam at the Dutch Film and Television Academy, Zinderend, she won a Cannon Award in 1988. In the following years, she worked as an assistant director, until she returned in 1994 as a director. For the VPRO-series Lolamoviola she made the short movies Coma and Achilles en het zebrapad (Achilles and the Zebracrossing). With the first, she won a Golden Calf for the best television drama.

In 1996 Van der Oest made her first long movie, De nieuwe moeder (The New Mother). Her husband at the time, Theu Boermans, had a role in this movie (later, he would also have a role in Zus & Zo). De trip van Teetje (the journey of Teetje) was produced in 1998, with Cees Geel as a louche entrepreneur who buys a Russian cargo ship.

With Zus & Zo, loosely based on Chekhov's The Three Sisters, Van der Oest directed her first mainstream film in 2001. The realistic characters and the relations among the individuals from her former movies remained central, but there was more humour added, and an English script doctor made some changes, resulting in an Oscar nomination. However, the general public left the movie unseen.

Hereafter she created the English thriller/fairytale Moonlight (2002) about the relation between a 13-year-old girl and a balloon swallower of the same age; the film Madame Jeannette, situated in the Suriname-community (which was a great success in the Amsterdam Bijlmer area in 2004); and the film Verborgen gebreken (2004), based on a book by Renate Dorrestein. Moonlight was entered into the 25th Moscow International Film Festival.

In 2001, she wrote the screenplay for Meral Uslu's telefilm Roos and Rana.

Currently, Paula van der Oest is planning a second film about Suriname and she is working on a movie based on Heleen van Royen's De gelukkige huisvrouw (The Happy Homemaker).

== Filmography ==
- 1988 - Zinderend
- 1994 - Coma
- 1995 - Achilles en het zebrapad
- 1996 - Always yours, for never
- 1996 - De nieuwe moeder
- 1997 - Smakeloos
- 1998 - Meedingers (televisiefilm)
- 1998 - De trip van Teetje
- 1999 - episode 2 (Doolhof) of the television sequel 'De zeven deugden'
- 1999 - Link spel
- 2001 - Zus & Zo
- 2002 - Moonlight
- 2004 - Madame Jeanette
- 2004 - Verborgen gebreken
- 2008 - Tiramisu
- 2008 - Wijster
- 2011 - Black Butterflies
- 2011 - Mixed Up
- 2012 - The Domino Effect
- 2014 - Accused
- 2016 - Tonio
- 2017 - Kleine IJstijd
- 2020 - The Bay of Silence
- 2021 - Love in a Bottle
