= Instinct (2019 film) =

Film by Halina Reijn

- Theatrical release poster
- Directed by: Halina Reijn
- Written by: Esther Gerritsen; Halina Reijn
- Produced by: Frans van Gestel; Arnold Heslenfeld; Laurette Schillings
- Starring: Carice van Houten; Marwan Kenzari
- Cinematography: Jasper Wolf
- Edited by: Job ter Burg
- Music by: Ella van der Woude
- Production companies: Topkapi Films; BNNVARA; Man Up Film
- Distributed by: September Film Distribution
- Release dates: 12 August 2019 (Locarno); 3 October 2019 (Netherlands)
- Running time: 94 minutes
- Country: Netherlands
- Language: Dutch
- Box office: $947,316

Instinct is a 2019 Dutch psychological thriller drama film directed by Halina Reijn in her feature-length directorial debut from a script she co-wrote with Esther Gerritsen and it stars Carice van Houten and Marwan Kenzari. It follows Nicoline, a prison therapist who becomes obsessed with a patient, who is a convicted serial rapist.

Development of the film started in 2015 under the name of Locus of Control based on a pitch by Reijn. She and Gerritsen did extensive research into the subject while writing the script, including a visit at a clinic. Filming took place in May 2018 over the course of 23 days on a modest budget. Most of the production took place in the vacant Bijlmerbajes, a former prison complex.

The film had its premiere at the 72nd Locarno Film Festival and was the opening film at the 39th Netherlands Film Festival on September 27, it was released in Dutch theaters the following week. It received generally positive reviews from critics and was selected as the Dutch entry for the Best International Feature Film at the 92nd Academy Awards, but it was not nominated. It was awarded a Golden Film for having sold 100.000 tickets at the box office.

== Plot ==
Nicoline, a single woman and a renowned prison therapist, who is between jobs and is uninterested in full-time employment, starts working at a prison hospital where she takes on the caseload of a previous counsellor who resigned. Here she meets Idris, a charismatic convict with a history of committing sexual violence who is on the verge of being paroled without supervision. Most of Nicoline's co-workers are satisfied with Idris's behaviour and feel confident to allow him to go on unsupervised leave on a trial basis. Nicoline, however, isn’t so sure about this; she finds him manipulative and his behaviour towards a violent incident between two other inmates disturbing. She disapproves of unsupervised parole while colleagues remain adamant, and begins keeping a close eye on him.

As their working relationship starts off with distrust and antagonism, Idris asks Nicoline one morning if he can switch counsellor, which gets rejected, accusing her getting too personal and implying she is attracted to him. On a night out, Nicoline and her co-worker Alex have sex while intoxicated. At work, Nicoline unsuccessfully threatens Idris with an indefinite stay to gauge his response. Meanwhile, she keeps disagreeing with her colleagues about Idris's trajectory, claiming that the reason they have a positive assessment of Idris is due to his charm and his telling people what they want to hear.

Over time Nicoline develops an obsession with Idris, going over certain details, including visiting a fast food chain he mentioned. At the same time, she is trying to make her relationship with Alex work, visiting him all dolled up at a prison basketball game, but it falls apart due to Idris getting in the way. Following this, Nicoline is having doubts about her role but these are dismissed by her boss. On his first unsupervised trip, Nicoline decides to follow Idris to a local beach. They end up at a remote spot on the beach, at a standstill Idris implies to know what Nicoline wants but he denies her.

The tension is causing a strain between Nicoline and her mother, which whom she normally has a loving relationship. First, Nicoline tries to end their arrangement, causing Idris to leave in a fit of anger and end up seemingly killing a rabbit he was earlier taking care o. Later, in an empty gymnasium, Idris tells they should change counsellors, but they are overcome with desire and kiss each other. In the aftermath, Nicoline disassociates, unsure what to do. She decides to tell her boss but her boss is absent. Following this, Nicoline's intern, Marieke, reveals secrets about Idris Nicoline already knows and remarks she also visited a fast food chain, but a different one, making Nicoline feel dumb about her own obsession.

Nicoline tries to get order in her life by cleaning her apartment, but she is visited by Idris, who tries to convince Nicoline to date him following his release. Someone rings the bell but Nicoline doesn't open. Nicoline admits she is afraid of him and the two have an argument. Ultimately, Idris takes advantage over Nicoline's shaky and conflicted psychological situation and rapes her. Subsequently, Nicoline returns to Idris in his cell and goads him into making out with her outside of the view of the camera; however, she presses the alarm on her belt, which causes the guards to come in and take Idris away, assuming he was assaulting Nicoline. The film ends with Nicoline laying in Idris's bed, before standing up and leaving the room in a relatively calm mood.

== Cast ==
- Carice van Houten as Nicoline
- Marwan Kenzari as Idris
- Marie-Mae van Zuilen as Marieke
- Pieter Embrechts as Alex
- Ariane Schluter as Director
- Betty Schuurman as Nicoline's Mother
- Abdelkarim El Baz as Tarik
- Tamar van den Dop as Milly
- Robert de Hoog as Jos
- Juda Goslinga as Kees
- Barry Emond as Kenny
- Akwasi Owusu Ansah as Wilfred
- Maria Kraakman as Paula
- Matijs Janssen as Dave

== Production ==
Reijn had desire to direct feature films for quite some time and had been exploring various concepts with production company Topkapi Films. The idea for the film came when Reijn was watching a documentary programme called "Liefde in de TBS" (Love in the TBS) broadcast by EO, how about how relationships happen between therapists and their patients in a prison psychiatric hospital. She wanted to explore intimacy with a woman who is unable to be intimate with others due to her being hurt in the past, which makes her doubt her own instincts in regard to her own sexuality and desires. Reijn wanted to examine her own confused feelings around her own sexuality and alongside wanted to explore themes of power, sexuality and intimacy. She also described it as an "abstract experiment" that is not meant to be a "realistic movie".

Reijn pitched the concept to film producer Frans van Gestel, about a psychotherapist who falls for her worst enemy. Van Gestel contacted five screenwriters for the project, of the five, Esther Gerristen was the one hired, who had previously co-penned screenplays for Nena and Craving. Reijn viewed it as an important step at the time as she regarded having a second writer as necessary. Reijn and Gerristen began with research and writing of the script in 2015. Following the start of the #MeToo movement, they got more motivated to see the project through after the movement took off. They researched anything they could find about TBS, including a visit to a TBS-clinic in order to fact-check their own work. Michel Schöpping was brought in by van Gestel for the sound design. He also surrounded Reijn with other experienced professionals, including cinematographer Jasper Wolf and editor Job ter Burg. Both the Netherlands Film Fund and distributor September Films became early supporters of the project. They decided to keep the production small-scale with a modest budget, both Reijn and van Houten took salary to keep costs down, and they had to use their existing industry connections to bring in a film crew, who would work below their usual rates. This would in turn provide more creative freedom, and it also allowed van Gestel to prevent the film from becoming an overly complicated co-production.

In one of their first meetings they decided to include less female nudity, with a focus on the female gaze. Van Houten, recalled in hindsight asking herself the question regarding her previous projects, "Why am I even naked for this scene?", they also wanted to avoid the objectification of women in the film and wanna show off sexuality without immediately adding female nudity. The movie does contains male nudity, and they wanted include full frontal nudity, but they were overruled, even though Kenzari was up for it. Writing and filming happened under the working title of Locus of Control. Carice van Houten and Marwan Kenzari were cast in the lead roles, van Houten was also a co-producer on the project. Marie-Mae van Zuilen, Pieter Embrechts, Ariane Schluter, Betty Schuurman, Abdelkarim El Baz, Tamar van den Dop, Robert de Hoog, Juda Goslinga, Akwasi Owusu Ansah, Barry Emond, Maria Kraakman and Matijs Janssen rounded out the rest of the cast. Principal photography only took 23 days. The shoot took place in May 2018 and was primarily filmed in the vacant Bijlmerbajes prison.

They changed the name from Locus of Control to Instinct, realizing most people wouldn't know the term locus of control. Composer Ella van der Woude was brought onto the end of production, as she was shown a finished cut. Before signing on she remarked if they needed her at all, as she thought the film already worked without any music.

== Release ==
The world premiere of the Instinct was on August 12, 2019 at the 72nd Locarno Film Festival. It was the first Dutch film to be selected for the festival. It was screened in the Contemporary World Cinema section at the 2019 Toronto International Film Festival. The film was the opening film for the 39th Netherlands Film Festival on September 27. The original scheduled Dutch cinema release date for the film was October 3, but was moved up for the purpose of complying with the eligibility rules for the Academy Awards, which states that films need to be released in the country of origin before October 1st in order to qualify. Film distributor September Film stated that film theatres were giving the option to show the film earlier following its debut at the Netherlands Film Festival.

Instinct also played at the BFI London Film Festival in October, where it was nominated for the Sutherland Trophy. That same month it also shown at the Film Fest Gent and Chicago International Film Festival, at the latter it competed in the New Directors Competition. The film was selected as one of the Academy Award for Best International Feature Film entries that was shown at the Palm Springs International Film Festival in January 2020.

On September 19, 2022, it was announced that A24 had acquired North American distribution rights to the film, exclusively screening it as double feature with Reijn's Bodies Bodies Bodies in the company's screening room three days later on September 22.

== Reception ==
On the review aggregator website Rotten Tomatoes, 80% of 15 critics' reviews are positive, with an average rating of 7.40/10. Metacritic, which uses a weighted average, assigned the film a score of 66 out of 100, based on 5 critics, indicating "generally favorable" reviews.

The film was awarded the Golden Film for having sold 100.000 tickets at the Dutch box office.

=== Awards and nominations ===
Year	Association	Category	Recipient(s)	Result	Ref(s).
2019	Chicago International Film Festival	New Directors Competition	Halina Reijn	Nominated	
2019	Locarno Film Festival	Variety Piazza Grande Award	Halina Reijn, Carice van Houten	Won	
2019	Locarno Film Festival	Swatch Art Peace Hotel Award - Special Mention	Halina Reijn, Carice van Houten	Won	
2019	London Film Festival	Sutherland Award	Halina Reijn	Nominated	
2019	Les Arcs Film Festival	Best Narrative Feature	Halina Reijn	Nominated	
2019	Les Arcs Film Festival	Cineuropa Award	Halina Reijn	Won	
2019	Les Arcs Film Festival	Best Actress	Carice van Houten	Won	
2019	Les Arcs Film Festival	Young Audience Award	Halina Reijn	Won	
2020	European Film Awards	European Discovery of the Year	Halina Reijn	Nominated	
2020	Miami Film Festival	Jordan Ressler First Feature Award	Halina Reijn	Nominated	
2020	Netherlands Film Festival	Golden Calf for Best Script	Esther Gerritsen, Halina Reijn	Nominated	
2020	Netherlands Film Festival	Best Actor	Marwan Kenzari	Nominated	
2020	Netherlands Film Festival	Best Actress	Carice van Houten	Nominated	
2020	Palm Springs International Film Festival	FIPRESCI Prize for Best Foreign Language Film	Halina Reijn	Nominated	

== See also ==
- List of submissions to the 92nd Academy Awards for Best International Feature Film
- List of Dutch submissions for the Academy Award for Best International Feature Film
