= Meninas Não Choram =

- Theatrical release poster
- Directed by: Vivianne Jundi
- Written by: Gabriel Amaral; Bryan Ruffo
- Based on: Achtste-groepers huilen niet by Jacques Vriens
- Starring: Letícia Braga; Alana Cabral; Duda Matte; Giuseppe Oristanio; Elisa Lucinda; Amanda Richter
- Production company: Telefilms
- Distributed by: Netflix
- Release date: 30 May 2024
- Running time: 101 minutes
- Country: Brazil
- Language: Portuguese

Meninas Não Choram is a 2024 Brazilian drama film directed by Vivianne Jundi and starring Letícia Braga. The film is an adaptation of the book Achtste-groepers huilen niet by Jacques Vriens, which also inspired a 2012 Dutch film of the same name. Produced by Telefilme and distributed by Netflix, the film was released on May 30, 2024.

== Plot ==
The film commences with a football match between boys and girls. Filipa, nicknamed Pipa, is the star player of the girls' team, which emerges victorious over the boys' team. Subsequently, a teacher makes an announcement in Pipa's classroom, stating that at the end of the semester the ninth edition of an interschool football championship would be held at a camp in Belo Horizonte; however, it would differ from previous editions, as the football teams would be composed of both girls and boys. Pipa and her sister Isabel return home from school and have lunch with their parents. Upon nightfall, Pipa goes to Alana's house and plays with her; Pipa bleeds while playing with Alana. After two days, Pipa discovers that her mother had been contacting an oncologist, a physician who treats patients with cancer. She discovers that she has leukemia, a blood cancer, and must be hospitalized. Pipa's family conducts a bone marrow donor campaign to help her; the campaign saves the life of one person, but not Pipa's.

== Cast ==
- Letícia Braga as Filipa "Pipa" Dias
- Alana Cabral as Alana
- Cauã Martins as Heitor
- Duda Matte as Beca
- Pedro Miranda as Tuco
- Marjorie Queiroz as Isabel Dias
- Emílio Orciollo Netto as Sérgio Dias
- Giuseppe Oristanio as Dr. "Bigode" Freitas
- Fernanda Rodrigues as Renata Dias
- Elisa Lucinda as school principal
- Amanda Richter as teacher Flora
- Juliana Lucci as monitor
- Jean Michel as Rafa
- Alê Oliveira as Valéria
- Isabel Guerón as Gabriela
- Rafa Sieg as Roberto
- Ricardo Martins as teacher Celso
- Joana Seibel as Beca's mother
- Letícia Santiago as player
