= Mijn Franse tante Gazeuse =

- Theatrical release poster
- Directed by: Joram Lürsen; Ben Sombogaart
- Written by: Burny Bos; Tamara Bos
- Produced by: Burny Bos
- Starring: Caroline van Gastel
- Cinematography: Remco Bakker; Peter Lataster
- Edited by: Herman P. Koerts
- Music by: Jan Robijns
- Production companies: Bos Bros. Film & TV Productions; AVRO
- Distributed by: Warner Bros.
- Release date: 7 April 1997
- Running time: 90 minutes
- Country: Netherlands
- Language: Dutch

Mijn Franse tante Gazeuse is a 1997 Dutch comedy film directed by Joram Lürsen and Ben Sombogaart. It is a re-edited version of the 1996 television show broadcast by AVRO.

It received a limited release on 7 April 1997 by Warner Bros. under their Family Entertainment label.

== Plot ==
The village of Droogbaak where Katootje Tekelenburg lives has been declared the neatest in the country. The queen has decided to visit this village. The mayor proposes her to visit the neatest house in the town. Katootje's house and that of her neighbor qualify for this because they are the tidiest inhabitants. Katootje's father does everything in his power to win the prize, and at that moment he thinks of nothing else, much to the annoyance of his wife and daughter. The announced visit of her French Aunt Gazeuse with her fiancé O.J. aan de Loire causes her father to become even more nervous. This gets worse when Katootje says she would like a pet, preferably a rabbit, for her eighth birthday. Since her father won't let her do this, she decides to keep the rabbit secretly. She hides it in the statue in the village square. The battle for the village's neatest resident is rather complicated by all these circumstances, both for father Tekelenburg and for neighbor Van Zanten.

== Cast ==
- Afroditi-Piteni Bijker as Katootje Tekelenburg
- Caroline van Gastel as Tante Gazeuse
- Boris de Bournonville as O.J. aan de Loire
- Walter Crommelin as Vader Tekelenburg
- Hanneke Riemer as Moeder Tekelenburg
- Nelly Frijda as Burgemeester
- Willeke van Ammelrooy as Queen
  - Lucretia van der Vloot as Queen (singing voice)
- Loes Luca as Midwife Willems
- Hans van den Berg as Buurman van Zanten
- Chris Bolczek as Brig. Kluif
- Anita Menist as Emmy Gé
- Joop van Zijl as Newsreader

== Home media ==
The film was released on VHS by Warner Home Video on 15 October 1997.
