= Tummy Tom and the Lost Teddy Bear =

2024 Dutch animated film

- Theatrical release poster
- Directed by: Joost van den Bosch; Erik Verkerk
- Written by: Burny Bos
- Based on: Dikkie Dik by Jet Boeke
- Produced by: Burny Bos; Linda Snoep
- Narrated by: Burny Bos (Dutch); Jan Decleir (Flemish)
- Music by: Alex Debicki
- Production companies: BosBros; Phanta Animation
- Distributed by: In The Air
- Release date: 19 June 2024
- Running time: 62 minutes
- Country: Netherlands
- Language: Dutch
- Box office: $1.3 million

Tummy Tom and the Lost Teddy Bear (Dutch: Dikkie Dik en de Verdwenen Knuffel) is a 2024 Dutch animated film produced and narrated by Burny Bos and directed by Joost van den Bosch and Erik Verkerk, based on the Dikkie Dik picture books by Jet Boeke. It was one of the last films produced by Bos before his death, along with its sequel Tummy Tom: A New Friend for Tummy Tom and Miss Moxy. The animation for the film was provided by Ka-Ching Cartoons.

The film was released in the Netherlands on 19 June 2024 by In The Air. A sequel was later released in December that same year.

== Release ==
The film was released in the Netherlands by In The Air on 19 June 2024. Incredible Film handled international sales and sold the film to KMBO in France, Look At That in Germany, Reverso in Spain and Kino Mediteran in Croatia.
