= The 4th Floor (2003 film) =

Planta 4a
- Theatrical release poster
- Directed by: Antonio Mercero
- Starring: Juan José Ballesta; Alejandro Zafra; Gorka Moreno; Luis Ángel Priego; Monti Castiñeiras
- Cinematography: Raúl Pérez Cubero
- Edited by: José María Biurrún
- Music by: Manuel Villalta
- Production companies: BocaBoca Producciones; Televisión Española; Canal+
- Distributed by: Buena Vista International
- Release date: 31 October 2003
- Country: Spain
- Language: Spanish

Planta 4ª (English: The 4th Floor) is a 2003 Spanish film directed by Antonio Mercero and starring Juan José Ballesta, Alejandro Zafra, Gorka Moreno, Luis Ángel Priego, and Monti Castiñeiras. The film was nominated for Best Picture at the 2004 Goya Awards.

== Plot ==
A group of seriously ill boys live on the fourth floor of a hospital. The floor serves as their home, and the other patients become their family. Miguel Ángel (Ballesta) is the leader of the group, while Jorge (Zafra), who has recently arrived, anxiously awaits his test results. Meanwhile, Dani (Moreno) is experiencing his first love affair.

== Cast ==
- Juan José Ballesta as Miguel Ángel
- Alejandro Zafra as Jorge
- Gorka Moreno as Dani
- Luis Ángel Priego
- Monti Castiñeiras

== Awards and nominations ==
=== Won ===
Montréal Film Festival

- Best Director (Antonio Mercero)

=== Nominated ===
Goya Awards

- Best Film (lost to Take My Eyes)

Spanish Actors Union

- Best Performance in a Minor Role – Male (Miguel Foronda)

== Dutch remake ==
A Dutch-language remake of the film called Sickos directed by Lodewijk Crijns and produced by Burny Bos, was released in 2014.

== See also ==
- List of Spanish films of 2003
