= Elyounoussi =

Elyounoussi (Arabic: اليونسي) is an Arabic surname that may refer to

- Mamoun Elyounoussi (born 1987), Dutch actor of Moroccan descent
- Mohamed Elyounoussi (born 1994), Norwegian football forward
- Tarik Elyounoussi (born 1988), Norwegian football player, cousin of Mohamed
