= Kule kidz gråter ikke =

- Film poster
- Directed by: Katarina Launing
- Written by: Linda May Kallestein
- Based on: Achtste-groepers huilen niet by Jacques Vriens
- Production company: Cinenord
- Distributed by: SF Norge
- Release date: 10 January 2014
- Running time: 93 minutes
- Country: Norway
- Language: Norwegian

Kule kidz gråter ikke (English: Cool Kidz Don't Cry, also known as Kick It!) is a 2014 Norwegian drama film directed by Katarina Launing. It is a remake of the 2012 Dutch film Achtste Groepers Huilen Niet, which was based on the book Achtste-groepers huilen niet by Jacques Vriens. The movie stars Mia Helene Solberg Brekke, who portrays Anja, a teen with cancer.

== Plot ==
Anja (Mia Helene Solberg Brekke) is an energetic young girl that absolutely adores soccer, despite her classmate Jonas bullying her and telling her that it's not a girl's sport. She continues on unabated, unaware that this is merely his way of trying to express his feelings of love for her. However, things take a tragic turn, when Anja discovers that she has leukemia, which requires treatment and hospitalization that will keep her from entering a school soccer tournament. This devastates her, and it's up to Jonas and Anja's friends Lars and Lisa to come up with a way to allow Anja to play.

== Cast ==
- Mia Helene Solberg Brekke as Anja
- Victor Papadopoulos Jacobsen as Jonas
- Jeppe Beck Laursen Doctor Bart

== Soundtrack ==
1. In Your Arms by Nico & Vinz
2. Younger by Julie Bergan
3. Midnattssol by Shaun Bartlett

== Development and filming ==
The film received subsidy of 6,800,000 Norwegian kroner in 2013 from the Norwegian Film Institute.

== Reception ==
Critical reception for Kule kidz gråter ikke has been mostly positive and much of the praise centered upon Launing's directing and how the film approached the subject of cancer as it applies to children. The NRK and Verdens Gang marked this as a highlight of the film, and Verdens Gang further noted that the movie did not suffer from the stiffness or awkwardness that typically accompanied remakes of popular films. The paper later went on to remark that the movie had been very popular in Norway and by early April, had sold over 100,000 tickets, which they credited to the film's delivery of the subject matter. Bergens Tidende commented that one of the film's strong points was that it told the story from the perspective of children as opposed to adults and that it tried to approach the film's subject in a realistic manner, which meant that things would not end with everything solved neatly.

=== Awards ===
- ECFA Award at BUFF International Film Festival in Malmö (2014, won)
- Honorable mention at TIFF Kids (2014)
- Starboy Prize at Oulu International Children's and Youth Film Festival (2014)
