= Alfie, the Little Werewolf =

2011 Dutch family film

- Theatrical release poster
- Directed by: Joram Lürsen
- Screenplay by: Tamara Bos
- Based on: Dolfje Weerwolfje by Paul van Loon
- Produced by: Burny Bos; Ruud van der Heyde
- Starring: Kim van Kooten; Remko Vrijdag; Ole Kroes; Maas Bronkhuyzen
- Cinematography: Lex Brand
- Edited by: Peter Alderliesten
- Music by: Fons Merkies
- Production companies: BosBros; Inspire Pictures; AVRO
- Distributed by: Benelux Film Distributors
- Release date: 20 October 2011
- Running time: 90 minutes
- Country: Netherlands
- Language: Dutch
- Box office: $2.7 million

Alfie, the Little Werewolf (Dutch: Dolfje Weerwolfje) is a 2011 Dutch family film directed by Joram Lürsen and produced by Burny Bos and Ruud van der Heyde, based on the Dolfje Weerwolfje book series by Paul van Loon.

Benelux Film Distributors released the film on 20 October 2011.

== Plot ==
On his seventh birthday, Dolfje begins transforming into a fluffy white werewolf under the full moon. While his foster brother finds the transformation exciting and nicknames him "Dolfje the Little Werewolf," Dolfje fears his foster parents will reject him if they discover his secret. He faces further complications at school after biting a bully, and his neighbor, Ms. Krijtjes, sets a trap for him after Dolfje devours one of her chickens. Dolfje also struggles with a newly discovered vulnerability to silver. Although his secret is eventually revealed, his foster parents, including his stepfather who likes to act crazy himself, fully accept him.

== Cast ==
- Ole Kroes as Dolfje Weerwolfje
- Maas Bronkhuyzen as Timmie Vriends
- Remko Vrijdag as vader Vriends
- Kim van Kooten as moeder Vriends
- Joop Keesmaat as opa Weerwolf
- Trudy Labij as mevrouw Krijtjes
- Nick Geest as Nico Pochmans
- Barbara Pouwels as moeder Pochmans
- Lupa Ranti as Noura
- Dewi Reijs as moeder van Noura
- Pim Muda as meester Frans
- Bianca Krijgsman as juf Jannie
- Kees Hulst as hoofdmeester Rutjes
- Ottolien Boeschoten as tante Wies
- Niek van der Horst as monteur
- Sieger Sloot as meneer van Dale
- Luc Theeboom as collega Ozdm
- René van 't Hof as blinde man

== Release ==
=== Critical response ===
The film received mixed reviews from critics.

=== Home media ===
The film was released on Blu-ray and DVD on 9 May 2012.
