= Sickos (film) =

2014 Dutch comedy drama film

- Theatrical release poster
- Directed by: Lodewijk Crijns
- Written by: Lodewijk Crijns
- Based on: The 4th Floor
- Produced by: Burny Bos
- Starring: Jasha Rudge; Gijs Blom; Massimo Pesik; Vera van der Horst; Nicolette van Dam; Marcel Hensema
- Cinematography: Joost van Herwijnen
- Edited by: Herman P. Koerts
- Music by: Bart van de Lisdonk
- Production companies: BosBros; In The Air; VARA
- Distributed by: Entertainment One Benelux
- Release date: 12 February 2014
- Running time: 93 minutes
- Country: Netherlands
- Language: Dutch
- Box office: $313,837

Sickos (Dutch: Kankerlijers) is a 2014 Dutch comedy drama film written and directed by Lodewijk Crijns and produced by Burny Bos, based on the 2003 Spanish film The 4th Floor directed by Antonio Mercero.

The film was released on 12 February 2014 by Entertainment One Benelux.

== Cast ==
- Jasha Rudge as Iwan
- Gijs Blom as Olivier
- Massimo Pesik as Nick
- Vera van der Horst as Gina
- Nicolette van Dam as Sister Esmee
- Marcel Hensema as Marco
- Diggy Dex as himself

== Release ==
=== Critical response ===
The film received mixed reviews from critics.

=== Home media ===
The film was released on Blu-ray and DVD on 27 August 2014.
