= Miss Minoes =

2001 Dutch family film

- Theatrical release poster by Michael van Randeraat
- Dutch: Minoes
- Directed by: Vincent Bal
- Screenplay by: Burny Bos; Tamara Bos; Vincent Bal
- Based on: Minoes by Annie M.G. Schmidt
- Produced by: Burny Bos
- Starring: Carice van Houten; Theo Maassen; Sarah Bannier
- Cinematography: Walther Vanden Ende
- Edited by: Peter Alderliesten
- Music by: Peter Vermeersch
- Production companies: Bos Bros. Film-TV Productions; AVRO
- Distributed by: Warner Bros. Pictures
- Release date: 6 December 2001
- Running time: 86 minutes
- Country: Netherlands
- Language: Dutch
- Budget: ƒ12 million
- Box office: $4.8 million

Miss Minoes (also known as Undercover Kitty; Dutch: Minoes) is a 2001 Dutch family film written and directed by Vincent Bal and co-written and produced by Burny Bos, based on the 1970 Dutch children's novel Minoes by Annie M.G. Schmidt. The film stars Theo Maassen and Carice van Houten as the titular character.

A film adaptation of Minoes was announced in 1999 following the success of The Flying Liftboy. Filming took place around various locations in the Netherlands.

The film was released on 6 December 2001 in the Netherlands by Warner Bros. Pictures under their Family Entertainment label, and was later broadcast as a four-episode miniseries on television by AVRO in 2003. The film received positive reviews and won the Golden Calves for Best Feature Film and Best Actress. Music Box Films released an English dubbed version in the United States on 23 December 2011 in New York City and Chicago.

== Plot ==
One night, a cat named Minoes stumbles upon a can of chemical liquid dropped by a truck, and after drinking it transforms into a human woman. As a human, she maintains her feline traits such as her fear of dogs, meowing on the roof with other cats, catching mice, purring, and eating raw fish. She soon meets a journalist named Tibbe de Vries, who works for the newspaper of the fictional town of Killendoorn.

Tibbe is very shy, and therefore he finds it quite hard to write good articles. At first, Tibbe does not believe she is a cat in human form, but Minoes happens to know all kinds of interesting news from the town cats, so it doesn't bother him. In exchange for food and shelter, Tibbe allows Minoes to help him with his journalist job by finding interesting news to write about. With the help of the Cat Press Service and all the news the cats bring in, Tibbe soon becomes the journalist with the best articles.

However, there is one important article that Tibbe does not dare to write: an article on the rich Mr. Ellemeet, the chemical factory owner. All town members consider him a respectable man, and a real animal lover. But all cats know that he is not what he seems. After Minoes finally convinces Tibbe to write and publish the article, the whole town turns its back on him. He loses his job and is almost evicted from his apartment.

However, Minoes helps set up a sting in which Ellemeet is filmed shooting at cats and exposed as the cruel villain he is. In the end, although Minoes has a chance to turn back into a cat by eating a bullfinch (which supposedly eats herbs that can cure many conditions such as that of a cat turning into a human), she decides to remain human and stay with Tibbe, having fallen in love with him. The film's credits reveal that the two got married.

== Cast ==
- Carice van Houten as Minoes
- Theo Maassen as Tibbe de Vries
- Sarah Bannier as Bibi
- Hans Kesting as Harrie de Haringman
- Wim van den Heuvel as Mr. Pastoor
- Olga Zuiderhoek as Mrs. Van Dam
- Kees Hulst as Mr. Van Dam
- Jack Wouterse as Mayor Van Weezel
- Pierre Bokma as Mr. Ellemeet
- Marisa van Eyle as Ms. Ellemeet
- Hans Teeuwen as Tinus (voice)
- Katja Schuurman as Minoes' sister (voice)
- Loes Luca as Aunt Moortje (voice)
- Wim T. Schippers as Simon The Schoolcat (voice)
- Paul Haenen as Mrs. Pastoor (voice)
- Frits Lambrechts as Joop (voice)
- Kim van Kooten as Leentje (voice)
- Annet Malherbe as Jakkepoes (voice)

== Production ==
=== Development ===
In an interview in 1998, Burny Bos announced that his next film would be an English-language adaptation of Schmidt's 1970 book Minoes, with filming taking place in Canada. However, this version of the film never materialized.

=== Filming ===
Principal photography took place from late 2000 to 5 March 2001 in Utrecht, Hilversum, Schiedam, Rotterdam, Alkmaar, Amersfoort and Amsterdam. During filming, Carice van Houten discovered she had a cat allergy and had to take allergy tablets during the shoot.

== Release ==
It was a box office success, grossing $4,227,362 in the Netherlands, $111,858 in Germany, $34,164 in Austria, and $389,200 in Norway.

=== 2026 4K restoration ===
In July 2026, Film distributor In The Air announced that a 4K restoration of Miss Minoes would receive a theatrical re-release on 13 August to celebrate the film's 25th anniversary, with the restoration scanned from the original negative by the Eye Filmmuseum.

== Reception ==
=== Critical response ===
The film received positive reviews from critics in the Netherlands.

The 2011 English dub received mixed reviews. Roger Ebert gave the film 2 out of 4 stars, saying that "the movie is probably ideal for those proverbial young girls who adore cats, and young boys, too. I can’t recommend it for adults attending on their own, unless they really, really love cats".

=== Home media ===
Miss Minoes was released on DVD and VHS by Warner Home Video on 4 October 2002 in the Netherlands. This DVD release is presented in a 1.85:1 letterbox format while the bonus materials included are a 25-minute behind the scenes featurette along with deleted scenes, bloopers, the music video "Nooit meer bang" sung by the pop group Abel, the film poster and multiple trailers. It sold around 250,000 copies within the first two months. The DVD release was later re-issued on 25 April 2007 as part of De Annie M.G. Schmidt Collectie 2 DVD set that includes The Flying Liftboy and Otje.

=== Accolades ===
Accolades received by Miss Minoes
Year	Award	Category	Recipient(s)	Result	Ref.
2002	Netherlands Film Festival	Golden Calf for Best Feature Film	Burny Bos	Won	
2002	Netherlands Film Festival	Golden Calf for Best Actor	Theo Maassen	Nominated	
2002	Netherlands Film Festival	Golden Calf for Best Actress	Carice van Houten	Won	

== See also ==
- Miss Moxy
