= Mischa Kamp =

Dutch film director

Mischa Kamp (born in Rotterdam on 7 August 1970) is a Dutch film director best known for the 2014 TV film Jongens (English title Boys).

== Career ==
In 1989, Kamp studied communications science at the New School for Information Services in Amsterdam. In 1991 she moved to the Nederlandse Film en Televisie Academie (Dutch Film and Television Academy), where she graduated in 1996 with the short film Mijn moeder heeft ook een pistool.

In the same year she was involved in the VPRO production Waskracht!. After several documentaries and short films, she became known in 2005 through the children's film Het paard van Sinterklaas (English title Winky's Horse). It received multiple award nominations and wins, and screenwriter Tamara Bos won a Golden Calf award for Best Screenplay of a Feature Film. The film received a Golden Film for 100,000 visitors. The 2007 sequel titled Waar is het paard van Sinterklaas? (English title Where's Winky's Horse?) also received the Golden Film after it also sold 100,000 cinema tickets. The film won the "Best feature film for children" during the 2008

In 2007, she won two awards during the Cinekid Festival, one the Jury award non-fiction for Bloot and the second the Jury award for fiction for Adriaan. After some more television films, in 2010 she directed LelleBelle (English title Sweet Desire) and in 2012, the family movie Tony 10 screened in movie theatres.

With Jongens, a gay-themed TV film broadcast in 2014 that was also shown in movie theatres owing to its huge popularity. The movie also won four awards at the Zlín-Jugendfilmfestival in 2014 in the Czech Republic. The awards were "First award international youth jury for "Best youth movie", the "First award international Oecumenical jury", the Public "Golden Apple" award for Best movie and the Miloš Macourek Award for Best youth actor in a youth movie" that was awarded to lead actor Gijs Blom. The film won the "Best Narrative Feature Film" Award during the 2015 KASHISH Mumbai International Queer Film Festival.

== Filmography ==
- 1996: Waskracht! (TV film)
- 2004: Zwijnen
- 2005: Het paard van Sinterklaas (English title Winky's Horse)
- 2006: Bloot: Seks
- 2006: Naked
- 2007: Waar is het Paard van Sinterklaas? (English title Where Is Winky's Horse?)
- 2007: Adriaan
- 2008: De fuik
- 2008: Vanwege de Vis
- 2010: LelleBelle (English title Sweet Desire)
- 2012: Tony 10
- 2014: Jongens (English title Boys)
- 2019: Romy's Salon

Short films

- 1996: Mijn moeder heeft ook een pistool (short film)
- 2002: De sluikrups (short film)
