= Wolfgang Lechner =

Austrian physicist and startup founder

Wolfgang Lechner (born 14 May 1981 in Kufstein) is a theoretical physicist from Austria. He is the co-founder and co-CEO of the company ParityQC (Parity Quantum Computing GmbH) and professor at the Institute for Theoretical Physics of the University of Innsbruck.

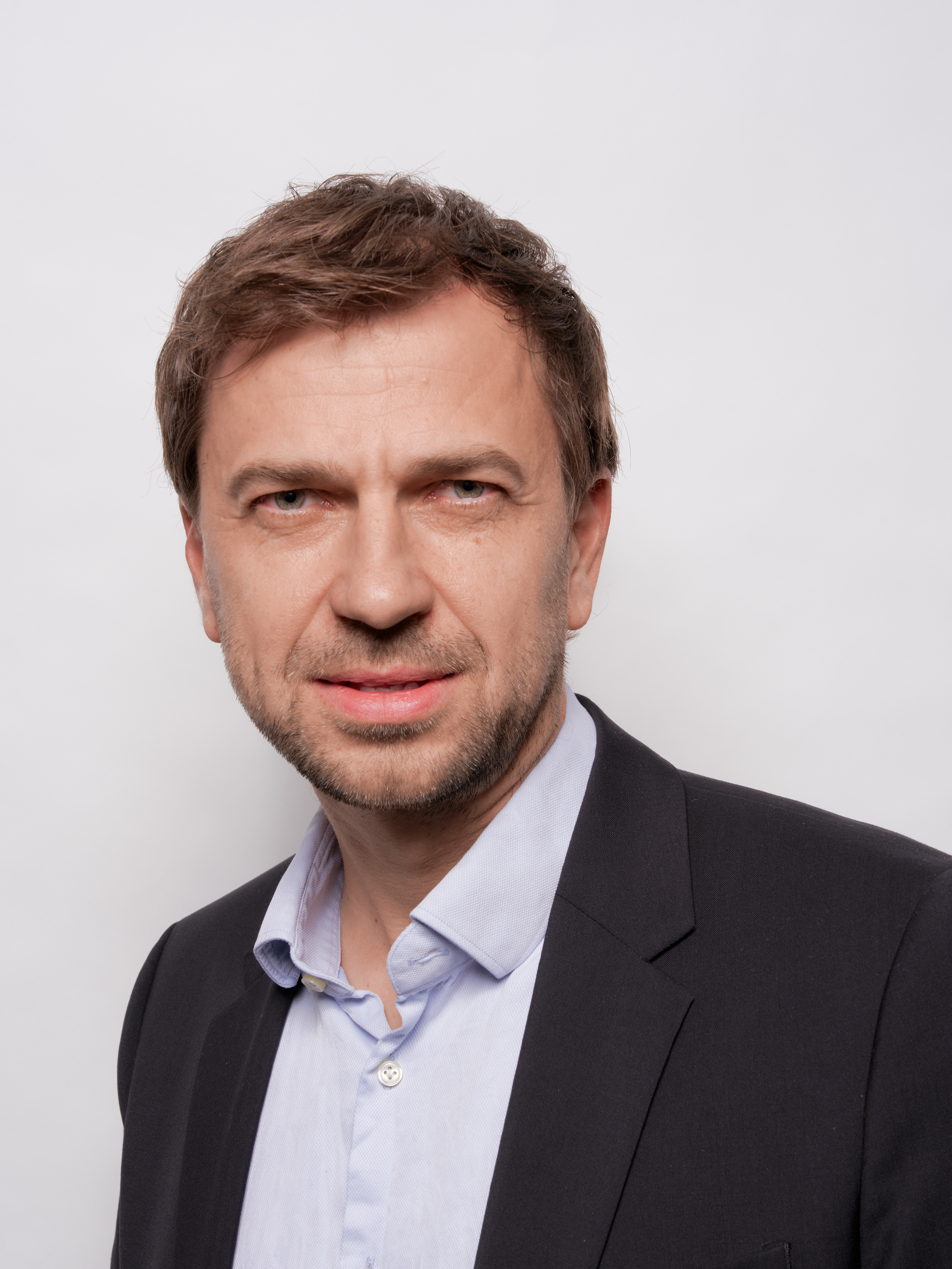

== Academic career ==
Wolfgang Lechner earned his Masters and PhD in Physics from the University of Vienna with Christoph Dellago as supervisor. He completed postdoctoral study under the direction of Peter Bolhuis at the University of Amsterdam from 2009 to 2011, followed by postdoctoral stints with Peter Zoller at IQOQI Innsbruck from 2011 to 2013 and at IQOQI Innsbruck from 2013 to 2016. Since December 2020 he is an associate professor at the Institute for Theoretical Physics, University of Innsbruck.

== Research ==
Together with his colleagues Philipp Hauke and Peter Zoller, Wolfgang Lechner developed a quantum computing scheme which mitigates the fundamental connectivity limitations of quantum computers and solves general optimization problems through a software architecture. In 2017, Lechner set up a research team in the field of quantum optimization at the University of Innsbruck. The research group is dedicated to theoretical quantum physics, with the aim to solve computationally challenging problems efficiently in near term quantum devices. The research group published several papers including "Quantum Approximate Optimization With Parallelizable Gates" and "Quantum Optimization via Four-Body Rydberg Gates".

== ParityQC ==
In January 2020 Wolfgang Lechner co-founded the company ParityQC together with Magdalena Hauser, as a spin-off from the University of Innsbruck, and with Hermann Hauser as mentor. ParityQC is a quantum architecture company that develops blueprints for quantum computers to solve optimization problems as well as the appertaining operating system called ParityOS. The ParityQC architecture is a generalisation of the LHZ architecture for both digital and analog quantum devices.

== Awards ==
Wolfgang Lechner has received a number of awards for his contributions to the field of quantum optimization. He was awarded the 2011 Loschmidt Prize of Austria's Chemisch Physikalische Gesellschaft, the 2015 Wallnöfer Prize of the Austrian Industrialists Association (IV), the 2017 Thirring Prize of the Austrian Academy of Sciences and the 2017 START Prize of the Austrian Science Fund. Lechner also received the Houska Prize 2019 which was awarded jointly to him and his research group, the Google Faculty Research Award for Quantum Computing, the 2020 "Spinoff Prize" Nature Research Award for ParityQC. In 2020, he was nominated among the "22 Innovators Building a Better Future" by Wired UK.
