= Jolijn =

Jolijn is a feminine Dutch given name. Notable people with the name include:

- Jolijn van de Wiel (born 1992), Dutch actress
- Jolijn van Valkengoed (born 1981), Dutch swimmer
