= Yannick van de Velde =

Dutch actor (born 1989)

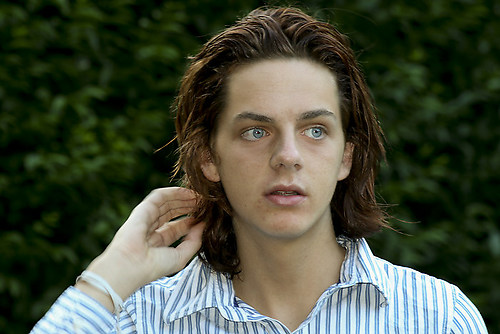
- Van de Velde in 2009
- Born: 15 August 1989 (age 37); Utrecht, Netherlands
- Occupation: Actor
- Years active: 1999–present
- Parent: Jean van de Velde

Yannick van de Velde (born 15 August 1989) is a Dutch actor and comedian who is best known for his role in the film In Orange. He is the son of Jean van de Velde, a film director. He's also the co-star and co-creator of the comedy skit series Rundfunk

== Career ==
In 2003, Van de Velde was a candidate for the role in the film Erik of het klein insectenboek. Instead of getting the role as a butterfly he chose to act as Remco van Leeuwen in the film In Orange. For which he won a 2005 Young Artist Award in the category Best Performance in an International Feature Film. In 2008, he was the lead actor in De Brief voor de Koning, in which he played as Tiuri.

Van de Velde dubbed the voice of Edmund Pevensie for the Dutch versions of The Chronicles of Narnia: The Lion, the Witch and the Wardrobe, The Chronicles of Narnia: Prince Caspian, and The Chronicles of Narnia: The Voyage of the Dawn Treader.

== Filmography ==
=== Films ===
- Johnny ATB (1999)
- Little Crumb (1999)
- Young Kees (2003)
- In Orange (2004)
- Floris (2004)
- De Brief voor de Koning (2008)
- Anouk 'Sad Singalongs' (2013)
- The Price of Sugar (2013)
- A Perfect Man (2013)
- Aanmodderfakker (2014)
- Homies (2015)
- Fissa (2016)
- Wasted (2016)
- Kamp Holland (2016)
- Adios Amigos (2016)
- Ferry (2021)

=== Television series ===
- Schoon goed (1999)
- Spangen (1999)
- All stars: De serie (2001)
- IJS (2001)
- S1ngle (2008)
- 2012, het jaar nul (2009–2010)
- Lieve Liza (2012)
- Moordvrouw (2013)
- Zusjes (2013)
- Goedenavond, Dames en Heren (2015)
- Rundfunk (2015)
- Overspel (2015)
- Undercover (2021)

== Awards ==
In 2005, Van de Velde won a Young Artist Award for Best Performance in an International Feature Film - Leading Young Performance for the film In Orange. He is the first Dutch actor to receive an award from this organization. The Young Artist Award also awarded the film In Orange for Best International Feature Film.
