= Achtste-groepers huilen niet =

1999 book by Jacques Vriens

- Author: Jacques Vriens
- Language: Dutch
- Subject: Leukemia, soccer
- Genre: Children's fiction
- Published: 1999, Van Holkema & Warendorf (Netherlands); 2014, Cappelen Damm (Norway)
- Publication place: Netherlands
- Media type: Print
- Pages: 175 pages (Dutch edition)
- Awards: Prijs van de Nederlandse Kinderjury
- ISBN: 9788202411718

Achtste-groepers huilen niet (English: Sixth Graders Don't Cry, also known as Kule Kidz Gråter Ikke, Cool Kids Don't Cry) is a 1999 Dutch children's book by Jacques Vriens. The book was first published in September 1999 as Achtste-groepers huilen niet and has since been translated into Norwegian and German.

== Synopsis ==
Akkie is a happy-go-lucky sixth grader that's obsessed with soccer, her friends, and the upcoming school trip. She's known for being tough and always up for a challenge, so when Akkie is diagnosed with leukemia she refuses to let it slow her down. Her classmates are in shock, but Akkie refuses to allow them to treat her as if she were broken. As time passes it becomes clear that her illness is very far progressed and it becomes harder for Akkie to do everything she wants to do in the time she has left.

== Background ==
Vriens, who formerly worked as a schoolteacher, drew inspiration for the book from one of his students named Anke, who suffered from leukemia. One of his students joked that he should write about Anke, to which the girl eagerly agreed. After she died in 1991 Vriens had difficulty approaching the subject matter, but Anke's mother encouraged him to write the book. It took him several times before he could begin writing, as the story was deeply personal to him and he would grow sad when he knew that the book's main character of Akkie would have to die. To distance himself from the work, Vriens changed the name of the book's main character and made Akkie's teacher female instead of male.

== Adaptations ==
Achtste-groepers huilen niet has been adapted for the screen three times. The first adaptation was the 2012 Dutch film Achtste Groepers Huilen Niet, which starred Hanna Obbeek as the main character of Akkie. It was nominated for several awards and won a 2012 Golden Film Award, a 2012 Golden Calf Audience Award, and the 2012 Rembrandt Award for Best Dutch Youth Film. The second adaptation was the 2014 Norwegian Kule Kidz Gråter Ikke, which was also a remake of the 2012 Dutch film. A third adaptation was the 2024 Brazilian film Meninas Não Choram, directed by Vivianne Jundi and starring Leticia Braga, which transposed the story to a Brazilian context.

There are currently plans to adapt the novel for American, Chinese, and Indian audiences.

== Reception ==
Bergens Tidende gave the book a positive rating.

=== Awards ===
- Prijs van de Nederlandse Kinderjury for 10-12 jaar (2000)
