= Sea of Silence =

2003 Dutch-language drama film

- Theatrical release poster
- Directed by: Stijn Coninx
- Screenplay by: Jacqueline Epskamp
- Produced by: Els Vandevorst; Ineke van Wierst
- Starring: Johanna ter Steege; Huub Stapel; Neeltje de Vree
- Cinematography: Walther Vanden Ende
- Edited by: Ludo Troch
- Music by: Henny Vrienten
- Production companies: Isabella Films; Sophimages; Lichtblick Film; Zentropa
- Distributed by: Warner Bros. Pictures
- Release dates: 29 October 2003 (Belgium); 27 November 2003 (Netherlands)
- Running time: 105 minutes
- Countries: Netherlands; Belgium; Germany; Denmark
- Language: Dutch

Sea of Silence (Dutch: Verder dan de maan) is a 2003 Dutch-language drama film directed by Stijn Coninx, starring Johanna ter Steege, Huub Stapel and Neeltje de Vree.

The film was released by Warner Bros. Pictures on 29 October in Belgium and 27 November in the Netherlands. It received mixed reviews and was a commercial failure, attracting only 13,000 attendances in Belgium and 1,811 in the Netherlands. It was selected as the Belgian entry for the Best Foreign Language Film at the 76th Academy Awards, but it was not nominated.

== Cast ==
- Huub Stapel as Mees Werner sr.
- Johanna ter Steege as Ita Werner
- Neeltje de Vree as Caro Werner
- Nyk Runia as Mees Werner jr.
- Yannic Pieters as Bram Werner
- Julia Van Lisenburg as Annette Werner
- Isabel Leur as Lettie Werner
- Anneke Blok as Tante Connie
- Annet Malherbe as Tante Masha
- Kees Hulst as Oom Tom
- Michiel Beurskens as Adri
- Marisa Van Eyle as Tante Veronica
- Jappe Claes as Oom Willy
- Betty Schuurman as Moniek
- Valentijn Vermeer as Thijs
- Dirk Roofthooft as Priester
- Bert André as Aad Schiller
- Flip Filz as Politieman
- Stefan de Walle as Leraar
- Wim Opbrouck as Badmeester
- Juul Vrijdag as Vrouw op bromfiets
- Michiel Nooter as Henk

== Release ==
The film was released on DVD by Warner Home Video on 19 May 2004.

== Reception ==
Pieter Bots of Het Parool gave the film 2 of 5 stars and wrote that Sea of Silence is "full of dramatic hairpin turns, unbelievable moments and a forced ending."

== See also ==
- List of submissions to the 76th Academy Awards for Best Foreign Language Film
- List of Belgian submissions for the Academy Award for Best International Feature Film
