= Jappe Claes =

Belgian actor

- Born: 22 October 1952 (age 73); Tienen, Belgium
- Occupation: Actor
- Years active: 1983-present

Jappe Claes (born 22 October 1952) is a Belgian actor; he mainly works in the Netherlands and appeared in more than forty films since 1983. In 2014 he left the Theaterschool after accusations of sexual abuse.

== Selected filmography ==
=== Film ===
Year	Title	Role	Notes
1992	Daens	Ponnet	
2003	The Alzheimer Case	Marcel Bracke	
2003	Sea of Silence	Oom Willy	
2009	Dossier K.	Marcel Bracke	
2013	The Verdict	Procureur-Generaal Vanderbiest	

=== Television ===
Year	Title	Role	Notes
1982-1983	Jacobus en Corneel	Jacobus	
2007	Flikken Gent	Joannes van Latem de Doncker	
2019	Idaten	Henri de Baillet-Latour	Taiga drama
