= Cowboy from Iran =

1999 film

- Written by: Burny Bos, Tamara Bos
- Directed by: Ilse Somers
- Country of origin: Netherlands
- Original language: Dutch

Production
- Running time: 75 minutes

Original release
- Release: 19 April 1999

Cowboy from Iran or Cowboy uit Iran is a 1999 Dutch TV film directed by Ilse Somers.

== Cast ==
- Edda Barends
- Marnie Blok
- Khaldoun Elmecky ... Amir
- René Lobo
- Brechtje Louwaard
- Dennis Rudge
- Juan Carlos Tajes
