= Stefan de Walle =

Dutch actor (born 1965)

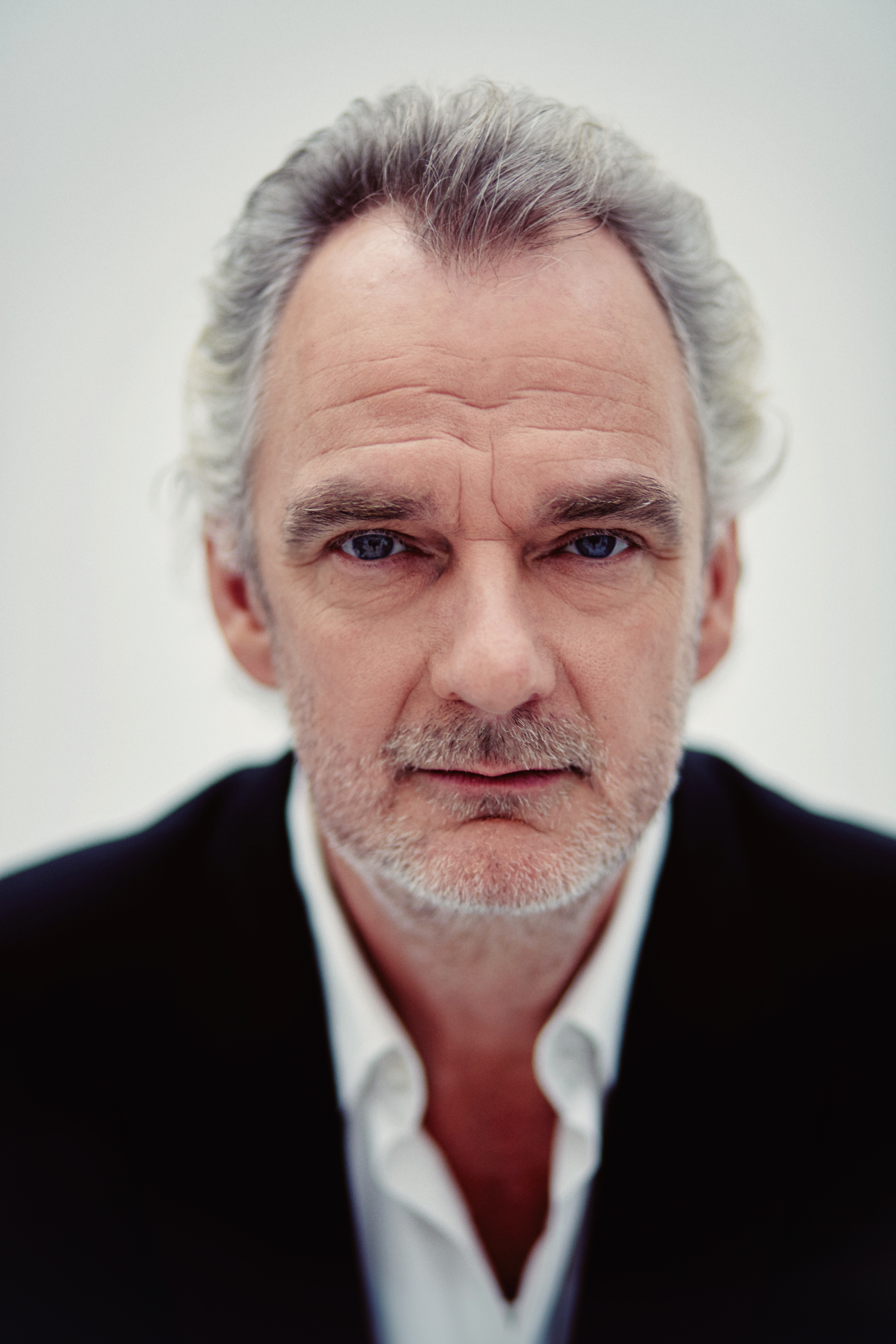
- Stefan de Walle (2016)
- Born: 15 September 1965 (age 61); The Hague, Netherlands
- Occupation: Actor

Stefan de Walle (born 15 September 1965) is a Dutch actor.

== Career ==
De Walle is known for his role of Kees in the spin-off television series of the 1986 film Flodder, which ran from 1993 to 1998. He also played this role in the 1995 film Flodder 3.

In 2011, he succeeded Bram van der Vlugt in the role of Sinterklaas who played the role from 1986 till 2010. De Walle played the role until September 2026. Gijs Naber succeeded him in November 2026.

== Selected filmography ==
- 1995: Once Beaten, Twice Shy
- 1995: Flodder 3
- 2001: De Vriendschap
- 2002: Peter Bell: The Movie
- 2003: Sea of Silence
- 2004: Tow Truck Pluck
- 2005: Offers
- 2006: Keep Off
- 2007: Moordwijven
- 2008: Hoe overleef ik mezelf?
- 2009: Het Sinterklaasjournaal: De Meezing Moevie
- 2012: De Marathon
- 2014: Secrets of War
- 2018: Craving
- 2021: My Best Friend Anne Frank
