= Betty Schuurman =

Dutch actress

- Born: 1962 (age 63–64); Edam, Netherlands
- Occupation: Actress
- Years active: 1992-present

Betty Schuurman (born 1962) is a Dutch actress. She appeared in more than forty films since 1992 including Character which won the Academy Award for Best Foreign Language Film at the 70th Academy Awards.

== Selected filmography ==
Year	Title	Role	Notes
1995	The Shadow Walkers	Margreet	
1997	Character	Joba	
2002	Twin Sisters		
2003	Sea of Silence	Moniek	
2005	Winky's Horse	Tante Cor	
2007	Where Is Winky's Horse?	Tante Cor	
2008	Bloedbroeders	Arnout's Mother	
2019	Instinct	Nicoline's Mother	
