= Xander Straat =

Dutch actor (born 1965)

Xander Straat (born 1965) is a Dutch stage, television and film actor.

He studied at the theatre school in Arnhem.

== Filmography ==
- Juju (1996)
- Wilhelmina (2001) (TV film)
- Black Book (2006)
- Achtste Groepers Huilen Niet (2012)

He directed the children's opera De familie Windsor by Matijs de Roo for "5 year Opera Festival" in Austerlitz, performed by the Young London Opera and 45 children and directed by Stefan Hofkes.
