= Miss Moxy =

2025 Dutch-language animated film

- Theatrical release poster
- Directed by: Vincent Bal; Wip Vernooij
- Written by: Maureen Versprille
- Produced by: Burny Bos; Linda Snoep; Petra Goedings; Jolande Junte
- Starring: Sarah Bannier; Pieter Embrechts; Frank Focketyn; Barbara Sarafian; Carice van Houten
- Music by: Steve Willaert
- Production companies: BosBros; Phanta Animation; Eyeworks; AVROTROS
- Distributed by: Paradiso Filmed Entertainment
- Release dates: 6 June 2025 (Lithuania); 28 January 2026 (Netherlands)
- Running time: 88 minutes
- Countries: Netherlands; Belgium
- Language: Dutch
- Budget: €9 million
- Box office: $950,955

Miss Moxy is a 2025 Dutch-language animated film directed by Vincent Bal and Wip Vernooij and produced by Burny Bos. It was one of the last films produced by Bos before his death, along with Tummy Tom and the Lost Teddy Bear and its sequel Tummy Tom: A New Friend for Tummy Tom.

== Cast ==
- Sarah Bannier as Miss Moxy
- Pieter Embrechts as Tuur
- Frank Focketyn as Ayo
- Barbara Sarafian as Rita/Lyonettes
- Carice van Houten as Pink

== Production ==
In 2019, BosBros formed a production alliance with production company Phanta Vision to co-produce its projects, with the first project being Miss Moxy and Tummy Tom and the Lost Teddy Bear. In 2022, the project was officially greenlighted with Netherlands Film Fund giving the film €1.8 million.

== Release ==
Studio 100 Film handled International sales and presented the film at the American Film Market. The first trailer was released on 11 February 2025. The film was first released in Lithuania on 6 June 2025. The film was later released in the United Kingdom and Ireland on 16 January 2026, and was released in the Netherlands on 28 January.

== See also ==
- Miss Minoes
