= Sweet Desire (film) =

- Dutch: LelleBelle
- Directed by: Mischa Kamp
- Written by: Jacqueline Epskamp; Tamara Monzon
- Produced by: Pieter Kuijpers; Iris Otten; Sander van Meurs; Manon van Melick
- Cinematography: Daniël Bouquet
- Edited by: Jurjen Blick
- Music by: Paleis van Boem; David Dramm; Perquisite
- Release date: 9 October 2010
- Running time: 85 minutes
- Country: Netherlands
- Language: Dutch

Sweet Desire (Dutch: LelleBelle) is a 2010 Dutch television film. The film was directed by Mischa Kamp from a script by Jacqueline Epskamp and Tamara Monzon. The leading roles were played by Anna Raadsveld, Benja Bruijning and Charlie Chan Dagelet.

The idea to make a female-friendly erotic film arose in 2006 from the BNN television program Spuiten en Slikken, which became the Telefilm LelleBelle. The film was broadcast on BNN on Nederland 3 on October 9, 2010, and was released on DVD on January 21, 2011.

== Story ==
Belle is nineteen and while everyone in her small town thinks about sex, Belle only wants to play the violin. Until she discovers that her earlobe is very sensitive. She auditions for the conservatory and goes on a musical and sexual journey of discovery in the big city.

== Casting ==
Actor	Character	Observation
Anna Raadsveld	Belle	leading role
Benja Bruijning	Jesse	
Charlie Chan Dagelet	Yukshi	
Tom Van Landuyt	Vincent	
Renee Fokker	Belle's mother	
Joost Bolt	Hendrik	
Isis Cabolet	Tara	Belle's sister
Roscoe Leijen	Gigolo John	
Tom Jansen	Teacher Wolf	
Maureen Teeuwen	Jury Member #1	
Barbara Beernink	Jury Member #2	
Chava Voor in 't Holt	Village girl #1	
Tess Milne	Village girl #2	
