= Trudy Labij =

Dutch actress (born 1943)

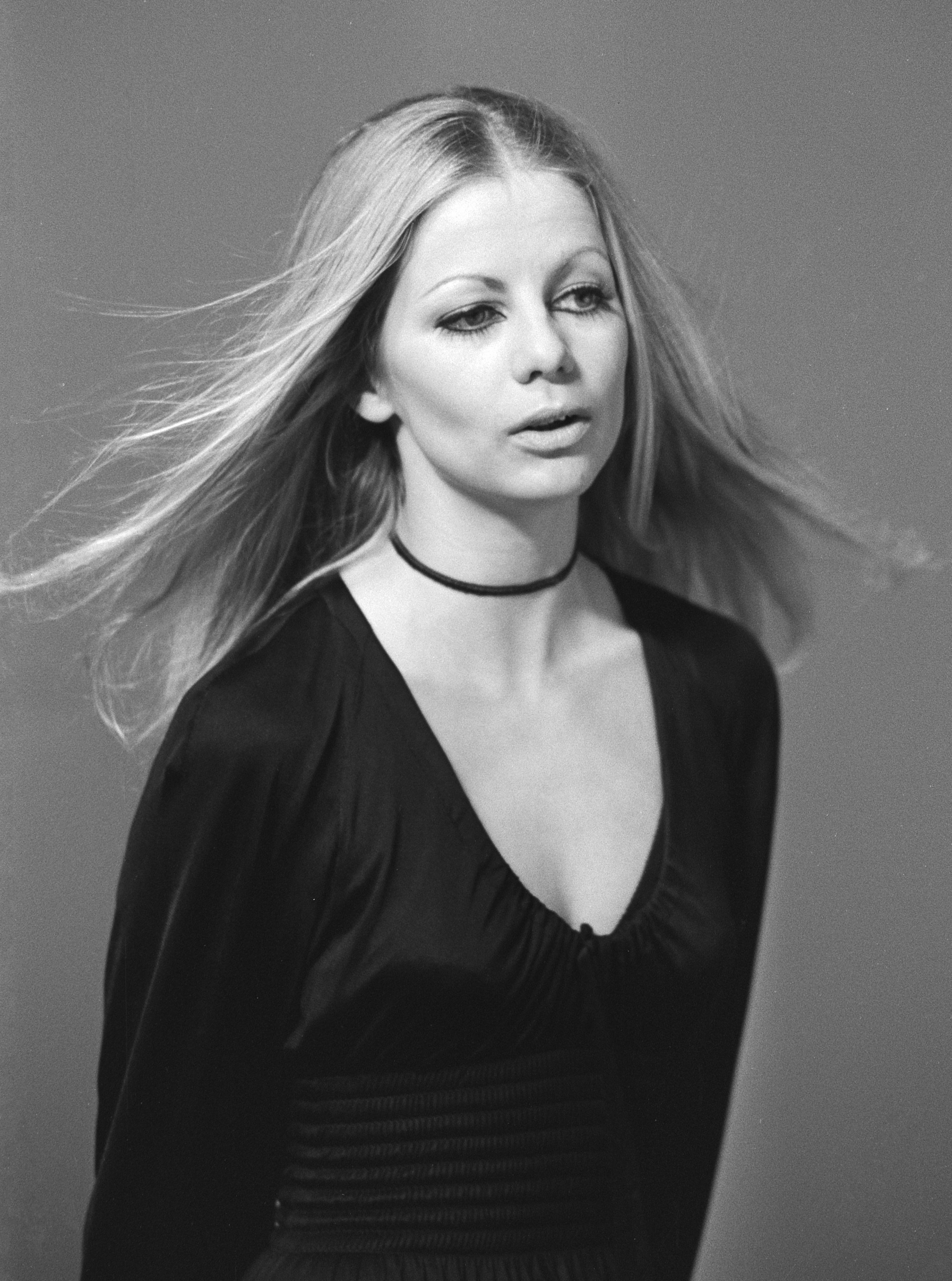
- Born: Adriana Geertruida Labij; 2 August 1943 (age 82); The Hague, Netherlands
- Occupation: Actress
- Years active: 1965–Present

Adriana Geertruida Labij (born 2 August 1943) is a Dutch actress. Although she is best known to the general public for TV series such as Joop ter Heul and Pleisterkade 17. She was noted for her comedic ability in the musicals such as Madam and Foxtrot, but since her stage debut in 1965 she has mainly played roles in classical and modern plays with the Haagse Comedie, Toneelgroep De Appel and the Ro Theater. Labij also played with the cabaret group Purple.

== Biography ==
Trudy Labij attended the Girls' School in Arnhem. After hearing Vondel in the municipal theater of her hometown, her love for theater was stimulated. She studied at the Arnhem Theater School and graduated in 1965. Almost immediately after graduating she was recruited into the subsidized theater with the Haagse Comedie company. She made her debut in 1965 in Peter Weiss's play The Persecution and Murder of Jean Paul Marat. She gained great fame in 1968 with her role as Joop ter Heulin the television series of the same name. Labij, who, in addition to her education at drama school, had also taken tap, singing and ballet lessons, was perfect for this series, a musical adaptation of the books by Cissy van Marxveldt.

In addition to her stage career with the Haagse Comedie, Toneelgroep De Appel and the Ro Theater, Labij also acted in feature films such as What see ik!? and television series. In one of these series, Pleisterkade 17, she was noticed by Annie M.G. Schmidt, who had written the series. Schmidt would put Labij forward in musical and stage productions of her hand, such as Foxtrot, Madam and A tear falls on the tompoes. She also appeared in stage and musical productions by other writers, such as De Stunt by Guus Vleugel. In 1981 she was awarded the Johan Kaart Prijs. Her role in the TV series Zonder Ernst (1992) felt like a personal failure and in 1994 she was replaced by Sjoukje Hooymaayer. Her solo performance Shirley Valentine in 2002 was much appreciated.

== Filmography ==
=== Television ===
- 1968 Joop ter Heul
- 1969 Till Death Do Us Part
- 1970 The Fantastic Adventures of the Baron of Münchhausen
- 1971 Tinsel
- 1974 Waaldrecht
- 1975-1977 Plasterkade 17
- 1979 The Late Late Lien Show
- 1991 Blinds as Rosa Oudshoorn
- 1992 Right for his Raab
- 1992-1994 Without Seriousness
- 1994 12 cities, 13 accidents
- 1996 Consultation
- 2000 Wildschut & De Vries
- 2001 All Stars
- 2002 Het Sinterklaasjournaal as Cleaning Lady
- 2004 Baantjer (Episode: De Cock and the murder of the past)
- 2007 Keyzer & De Boer Lawyers
- 2013 Charlie (Episode 5) as Paula
- 2015-2019 Family Kruys as Diny

=== Film ===
- 1968 The Trial by Fire (TV movie)
- 1971 What Do I See!?
- 1973 Don't Panic
- 1986 In the Shadow of Victory
- 1988 Shadow Man as Mevrouw Christine Wisse
- 1988 Maurits and The facts (TV movie)
- 1990 The Nutcracker Prince
- 2004 Erik or the Little Insect Book
- 2004 Love Trap
- 2007 Sexsomnia
- 2011 Alfie, the Little Werewolf
- 2018 All You Need Is Love as Tilly

== Theater ==
- 1965 - The persecution and murder of Jean Paul Marat
- 1965 - Dylan Thomas
- 1966 - Dream of a Midsummer Night
- 1966 - Lessons in slander
- 1966 - Spring Awakening
- 1966 - The Meteor
- 1967 - The Stunt
- 1967 - Between Horse and Bull
- 1967 - Prometheus
- 1967 - The Women of Troy
- 1969 - There's a hair in my soup
- 1970 - Butterflies are free
- 1970 - Jump out the window baby, we're getting married
- 1971 - Promotion! Promotion!
- 1973 - Barefoot in the Park
- 1975 - The Pants
- 1975 - The Snob
- 1976 - Jukebox 2008
- 1977 - Foxtrot
- 1979 - A tear falls on the tompus
- 1981 - Madame
- 1982 - Victor, or The Children in Power
- 1983 - The Miser
- 1983 - The Red Inn
- 1984 - Uncle Vanja
- 1984 - The Homecoming
- 1984 - Doctor Nero
- 1985–Present Christine
- 1985 - Faust I & II
- 1986 - Would you come upstairs, madam
- 1986 - Hay fever
- 1986 - Us Know Us
- 1987 - Amphitryon
- 1987 - Phaeton
- 1988 - A Family Affair
- 1988 - Happy End
- 1989 - Women for River Landscape
- 1989 - On Hope of Blessing
- 1989 - Macbeth
- 1990 - Summer Guests
- 1990 - Cat on a hot zinc roof
- 1991 - Private Lives
- 1992 - We have a horse together
- 1993 - Now it's wellecome
- 1995 - Eva Bonheur
- 1995 - The houseboat
- 1996 - Jorrie and Snorrie
- 1996 - Stupid Cow!
- 1998 - Ionesco / Yalta
- 1998 - Yes, yes, love
- 1999 - A tear falls on the tompus
- 2000 - Mocking Ghosts
- 2001 - Shirley Valentine
- 2002 - Extra Edition - Purple
- 2004 - La Bij
- 2004 - The woman who ate her husband
- 2005 - If on the Leidseplein...
- 2006 - La vie parisienne
- 2007 - Six dance lessons in six weeks
- 2009 - Sonneveld forever!
