= In Orange =

2004 film

- Theatrical release poster
- Directed by: Joram Lürsen
- Written by: Frank Ketelaar
- Produced by: Jeroen Beker; Frans van Gestel; San Fu Maltha
- Starring: Yannick van de Velde; Wendy van Dijk; Thomas Acda; Peter Blok
- Cinematography: Remco Bakker
- Edited by: Peter Alderliesten
- Music by: Fons Merkies
- Production companies: Motel Films; Fu Works; Clockwork Pictures; AVRO Television
- Distributed by: A-Film Distribution
- Release date: 28 April 2004
- Running time: 90 minutes
- Country: Netherlands
- Language: Dutch
- Box office: $1,333,147

In Orange (Dutch: In Oranje) is a 2004 Dutch family drama film directed by Joram Lürsen and written by Frank Ketelaar and starring Yannick van de Velde, Wendy van Dijk, Thomas Acda and Peter Blok. In Orange received a Golden Film after it had sold 100,000 cinema tickets in the Netherlands. The film also received international awards at film festivals in Hamburg, Isfahan, Kristiansand, Los Angeles, Poznań, and Rimouski.

== Cast ==
- Yannick van de Velde as Remco van Leeuwen
- Wendy van Dijk as Sylvia van Leeuwen
- Thomas Acda as Erik van Leeuwen
- Peter Blok as Arend Te Pas
- Dionicho Muskiet as Winston Mijnals
- Valérie Dupont as Lisa van Leeuw
- Maaike Polder as Anneke
- Sterre Herstel as Suzan van Leeuwen
- Porgy Franssen as Dokter Vlieberg
- Pepijn Gunneweg as hulp in de winkel
- Ton Kas as rechercheur
- Pim Muda as rechercheur
