= Secrets of War (film) =

- trailer
- Dutch: Oorlogsgeheimen
- Directed by: Dennis Bots
- Written by: Tanja Chung (translator) nl:Karen van Holst Pellekaan
- Based on: :nl:Oorlogsgeheimen (book) by Jacques Vriens
- Produced by: David-Jan Bijker; Martin Dewitte; Donato Rotunno; Reinier Selen; Harro Van Staverden; Brigitte Baake
- Starring: Pippa Allen; Maas Bronkhuyzen; Joes Brauers
- Cinematography: nl:Rolf Dekens
- Edited by: nl:Peter Alderliesten
- Music by: André Dziezuk
- Production companies: Bijker Film & TV; Rinkel Film
- Distributed by: Dutch FilmWorks
- Release date: July 2014
- Running time: 95 minutes
- Country: Netherlands
- Language: Dutch

Secrets of War (Dutch: Oorlogsgeheimen) is a 2014 Dutch drama film by director Dennis Bots. The story is based on the 2007 novel Oorlogsgeheimen by Jacques Vriens. The leading roles are played by Pippa Allen, Maas Bronkhuyzen, and Joes Brauers. The story is set during World War II. The film won the Rembrandt award for best Dutch youth film of 2015. In the same year, the film won the prize for best feature film at the Tromsø Children's Film Festival in Norway. In July 2015, the audience of the Stony Brook Film Festival in New York awarded "Best Picture" to Secrets of War.

== Plot ==
In a small village in Holland in 1943, the German occupation and the war penetrate deeper and deeper into the lives of the children. The two twelve-year-old boys Lambert and Tuur are best friends, although Lambert's father sympathizes with the Germans and Tuur's family with the resistance. At first the boys don't tell anyone about the hiding place of a downed Allied pilot in a tunnel system that they found together. However, after Tuur discovers that families from the neighborhood are being deported in freight cars, he becomes radicalized. He finally understands that his parents and older brother are active in the resistance against the Germans. In Lambert, whose father has meanwhile been appointed mayor by the Germans, he begins to see a traitor. When Tuur flirts with his new classmate Maartje and turns his back on Lambert, Lambert reveals that Maartje's host family is hiding a pig from the occupiers. Little does he know that he is putting the lives of Maartje –- whose real name is Tamar and is Jewish –- and her host family in danger. When Tuur follows the arrested Tamar to Maastricht and is arrested himself, Lambert promises his father that he will join the Nazi youth if he gets Tuur out of prison. Shortly after Tuur's release, Maartje's host father, under torture, betrays the other members of the resistance. Although the entire village is surrounded by German soldiers, Tuur and his family are able to flee to Belgium via the tunnels. Lambert supports them in this by bringing them food and other supplies. The fate of Tamar and the other villagers remains unknown.

== Cast ==
Actor	Character	Comments
Maas Bronkhuyzen	Tuur	Main role
Joes Brauers	Lambert	Main role
Loek Peters	Mr. Ramakers	Tuur's father
Nils Verkooijen	Leo	Tuur's brother
Eva Duijvestein	Mrs. Ramakers	Tuur's mother
Stefan de Walle	Mr. Nijskens	Lambert's father
Pippa Allen	Maartje	Main role
Beau Schneider	Roeland	Lambert's brother

== Awards ==
The film won: 2015 Berkshire International Film Festival (BIFF) Audience Award, 2014 Castellinaria International Festival of Young Cinema's Golden Castle Best Film, 2014 Chicago International Children's Film Festival Adult's Jury Award in the live-action feature category, and the Audience Choice Award for Best Feature at the 2015 Stony Brook Film Festival.
