= Johan Hoogewijs =

Flemish Belgian composer and sound designer,

Johan Hoogewijs (born 22 December 1957, Belgium) is a Flemish Belgian composer and sound designer, best known for his music to Flemish and Dutch TV series such as Heterdaad, Russen and Witse. Hoogewijs composed also the scores for the Dutch movies Zinloos (2004) and Winky's Horse with Jan Decleir (2005).

== Selected filmography ==
=== Television ===
- Boeketje Vlaanderen (1984)
- Postbus X (1988)
- Langs De Kade (1988)
- Lava (1989)
- Junglebook (1992)
- Caravas (1992)
- Niet voor Publicatie (1994)
- Interflix (1994)
- Kulderzipken (1996)
- Heterdaad (1996)
- Russen (2000–2004) Dutch TV series (42 episodes)
- Liefde & Geluk (2001)
- Veel geluk, professor (2001)
- Alexander (2001)
- Witse (2001–2007) (with Toots Thielemans)
- De Vijfhoek (2012)

=== Film ===
- Mémoures d’une princesse des Indes (1997)
- De Trein naar Kongo (1998)
- Verweesde liefdesbrieven (2000)
- Sin (2000)
- De Blauwe Roos (2002)
- L’Homme Qui Voulait Classer le monde (2002)
- Zinloos (2004) Dutch movie by Arno Dierickx
- Winky's Horse (Het Paard van Sinterklaas, 2005)
- Where Is Winky's Horse? (Waar is het Paard van Sinterklaas?, 2005)
- Mass Moving (2007)
- Achtste Groepers Huilen Niet (2012)
- Life as It Should Be (2020)

== solo project ==
- Colouring the Keys (2022)
