= Once Beaten, Twice Shy =

1995 film

Eenmaal Geslagen, Nooit Meer Bewogen
- Directed by: Gerrard Verhage
- Written by: Ger Beukenkamp (writer), Lucie Veldhuyzen-Marchal (novel)
- Cinematography: Nils Post
- Edited by: Stefan Kamp
- Music by: Fons Merkies
- Distributed by: Cinemien
- Release date: 6 April 1995
- Running time: 82 minutes
- Country: Netherlands
- Language: Dutch

Once Beaten, Twice Shy or Eenmaal Geslagen, Nooit Meer Bewogen is a 1995 Dutch film directed by Gerrard Verhage.

== Cast ==
- Ineke Veenhoven ... Mother
- Jack Wouterse ... Charles
- Ariane Schluter ... Gina
- Kathenka Woudenberg ... Mary
- Stefan de Walle ... Jozef
- Floor Nuygen ... Angela
- Bert Luppes ... Bart
