= Hoe overleef ik mezelf? =

2008 Dutch teen comedy film

- Theatrical release poster
- Directed by: Nicole van Kilsdonk
- Screenplay by: Tamara Bos
- Based on: Hoe overleef...ik mezelf? by: Francine Oomen
- Produced by: Burny Bos; Michiel de Rooij; Sabine Veenendaal
- Starring: Jolijn van de Wiel; Jade Olieberg; Mees Peijnenburg
- Cinematography: Danny Elsen
- Edited by: Wouter Jansen
- Music by: Chrisnanne Wiegel; Melcher Meirmans; Merlijn Snitker
- Production companies: Bos Bros. Film-TV Productions; NPS
- Distributed by: Warner Bros. Pictures
- Release date: 25 June 2008
- Running time: 97 minutes
- Country: Netherlands
- Language: Dutch
- Box office: $2.5 million

Hoe overleef ik mezelf? (stylized as Hoe overleef ik...MEZELF?) is a 2008 Dutch teen comedy film directed by Nicole van Kilsdonk and written by Tamara Bos, based on the book of the same name by Francine Oomen.

The film was released in the Netherlands by Warner Bros. Pictures on 25 June 2008. It won a Golden Film award for having 100.000 visitors and grossed over $2 million at the box office. The film received positive reviews.

== Synopsis ==
13-year-old Rosa van Dijk, her baby half-brother Abeltje and her recently divorced mother Heleen Hereema move from 's-Hertogenbosch to Groningen to live with her stepfather Alexander. Far away from her friends, in a new school and in an unfamiliar environment, she struggles with her self-esteem, her stepdad and her alter ego Rooz. Whatever she tries, she gets herself more and more into trouble. How will she survive all of this?

== Cast ==
- Jolijn van de Wiel as Rosa van Dijk
- Jade Olieberg as Esther Jacobs
- Mees Peijnenburg as Vincent van Gelderen (Neuz)
- Pascal Tan as Jonas de Leeuw
- Stefan de Walle as Alexander
- Romijn Conen as Joop van Dijk
- Janni Goslinga as Heleen Hereema

== Release ==
=== Home media ===
The film was released on DVD and Blu-ray by Warner Home Video on 5 November 2008.
