= Dikkie Dik =

Dutch series of children's picture books

Dikkie Dik book cover

Dikkie Dik is a Dutch series of children's picture books, starring the eponymous orange tomcat Dikkie Dik. The books are drawn by author Jet Boeke. They feature short, concise texts by Arthur van Norden. The series started in 1978 as part of the Dutch version of the children's TV show Sesame Street, but soon the stories appeared in bookstores.

On Sesamstraat the stories were read aloud by Piet Hendriks, with recurring characters like Tommie, Pino, or Troel listening. In the early 1980s, the stories were told by Rudy Kuhn, with some children as an audience, and in 1985 Frank Groothof took over.

In 2000, Boeke received the Kiekeboekprijs for her book Waar is Dikkie Dik?, as the best book for toddlers of the year.

In 2024, Joost Van Den Bosch directed a film called Dikkie Dik en de Verdwenen Knuffel (Tummy Tom and the Lost Teddy Bear). In the film, Tummy Tom discovers that his favorite cuddle toy named Bear is missing, but his friend Cat Mouse is there to help, because Tummy Tom cannot sleep without Bear. In December of the same year, a sequel Tummy Tom 2: A New Friend for Tummy Tom (Dikkie Dik 2: Een nieuwe vriend voor Dikkie Dik) was released. In this film, Tummy Tom gets a new neighbour, the dog Blaf, with whom he does not get along with at first but eventually forms a friendship with.

== Issues ==
- 1991 - Dikkie Dik gaat buiten spelen
- 1998 - Het blauwe blokboekje
- 1998 - Het groene blokboekje
- 1998 - Dikkie Dik Voorleesboek 2
- 1998 - Dikkie Dik naar het strand
- 1998 - Het rode blokboekje
- 1999 - Het gele blokboekje
- 1999 - Het geblokte blokboekje
- 1999 - Het roze blokboekje
- 1999 - Het witte blokboekje
- 1999 - Het oranje blokboekje
- 1999 - Het dikkerdandikke avonturenboek
- 2000 - De ballon
- 2001 - Dikkie Dik gaat in bad
- 2003 - Dikkie Dik jarig!
- 2004 - Dikkie Dik Kiekeboekje
- 2005 - Het vier verhalen boek
- 2005 - Dikkie Dik viert Sinterklaas
- 2005 - Dikkie Dik viert Kerstmis
- 2006 - Dikkie Dik telt voor tien
- 2007 - Welterusten Dikkie Dik
- 2008 - Het dikke verjaardagsboek
- 2008 - Dikkie Dik knisperboekje
- 2010 - Puzzelboek Dikkie Dik viert feest
- 2011 - Het dubbeldikke voorleesboek van Dikkie Dik
