= Winky's Horse =

2005 Dutch-Belgian Sinterklaas drama film

- Theatrical release poster
- Directed by: Mischa Kamp
- Screenplay by: Tamara Bos
- Based on: Winky en het paard van Sinterklaas by Tamara Bos
- Produced by: Burny Bos; Michiel de Rooij; Sabine Veenendaal
- Starring: Ebbie Tam; Jan Decleir; Betty Schuurman; Anneke Blok; Aaron Wan; Hanyi Han
- Cinematography: Lennert Hillege
- Edited by: Sander Vos
- Music by: Johan Hoogewijs
- Production companies: Bos Bros. Film-TV Productions; MMG Film & TV Production; AVRO
- Distributed by: Warner Bros. Pictures
- Release dates: 8 October 2005 (Netherlands Film Festival); 12 October 2005 (Netherlands); 26 October 2005 (Belgium)
- Running time: 95 minutes
- Countries: Netherlands; Belgium
- Languages: Dutch; Chinese
- Box office: $3.2 million

Winky's Horse (Dutch: Het Paard van Sinterklaas) is a 2005 Dutch-Belgian Sinterklaas drama film directed by Mischa Kamp, produced by Burny Bos and written by Tamara Bos, based on her 2002 book Winky en het paard van Sinterklaas. The film follows Winky Wong, who develops a fascination with horses amidst her struggles with her family immigrating from China to the Netherlands, When she hears about the arrival of Sinterklaas, she decides to get one from him this season.

The film was released in the Netherlands by Warner Bros. Pictures on 12 October 2005 and received a re-release the following year. The film received positive reviews from critics and won multiple award nominations and wins, it won a Golden Calf award for Best Script of a Feature Film and the film received a Golden Film for 100,000 visitors. The film was re-edited into a four-episode miniseries for television by AVRO in 2007. A sequel, Where Is Winky's Horse?, was released in 2007.

== Plot ==
Six-year-old Winky Wong and her mother immigrate from China to the Netherlands to help her father at his Chinese restaurant, where she meets delivery driver Samir and his girlfriend Sofie. While she is happy to see her father again, she struggles to adapt the language and general culture of the country.

After a humiliating experience at her first day of school, Winky encounters a pony named Saartje and befriends her owners Tante Cor and Oom Siem. She begins to visit the pony regularly and becomes adored by it. She later asks them if they are willing to teach her how to ride one. They are willing to give her lessons, but her parents refuse because they think it is dangerous for her to ride one. In school, she learns about the Sinterklaas holiday and traditions.

Winky's mother later gets a call about her sick mother and returns to China. Saddened by her absence, Winky visits Saartje for comfort. However, when she later visits her again with her friend Maaike, Siem informs them that the horse was euthanized due to her sickness and old age. Winky is devastated and heartbroken by this.

A few weeks later, her class announces that Sinterklaas and his Zwarte Pieten would be arriving in the village and they are invited for the annual parade. Winky, still grieving over Saartje and knowing she will not ever get a horse from her parents, decides that she should ask one from him and draws a picture of a horse for him. Samir brings Winky to the parade after her father refuses, but fails to deliver the drawing.

After another attempt where her father nearly trips over a shoe meant for Zwarte Piet, Winky sees a poster announcing that Sinterklaas would be attending at a department store in the city. In the store, Winky, assuming it is the real Sinterklaas, approaches him and asks if she could get a horse. The department store Sint tells her that she should wait till 5 December and promises that everything will be alright, When the day arrives, Winky's mother returns home.

Sinterklaas makes an appearance at her school to hand out gifts for her classmates. When it is her turn, her expectations were shattered when he gives her a stuffed dog instead. Upset, Winky bursts out at him and leaves the classroom. While she leaves, she notices a horse has been strapped to her bicycle. Winky interprets that it is the Sint's gift and rides away on it.

Later, Sinterklaas discovers that his horse Amerigo has gone missing. Realizing that Winky took it, he rushes to her home and eventually finds her, explaining that it is a misunderstanding. Winky refuses to return him, but after a conversation with Samir, she gives Amerigo back to him. The next day, Sinterklaas visits Winky and tells her he decided that she is allowed take care of Amerigo at Cor and Siem's equestrian facility while he is in Spain. Winky, happily riding Amerigo while Sinterklaas and her parents wave, finally understands what The Netherlands and Sinterklaas meant to herself and her parents.

== Cast ==
- Ebbie Tam as Winky Wong
- Aaron Wan as Vader Winky
- Hanyi Han as Moeder Winky
- Betty Schuurman as Tante Cor
- Jan Decleir as Oom Siem/Sinterklaas (St. Nicholas)
- Henry van Loon as Hoofdpiet
- Mamoun Elyounoussi as Samir
- Sallie Harmsen as Sofie
- Peter Bolhuis as Vader Sofie
- Anneke Blok as Juf Sigrid
- Nori de Winter as Maaike
- Katrien Pijnenborg as Moeder Maaike
- Guus Hoogeboom as Broer Maaike
- Nils Verkooijen as Nils
- Thijs de Vries as Cas
- Lorentz Teufer as Joris
- Dorus as Saartje
- Romano as Amerigo

== Production ==
Principal photography took place from January to March 2005 in Wijk aan Zee.

== Reception ==
=== Critical response ===
The film received positive reviews from critics. Bas Blokker of NRC Handelsblad called the film "fun, beautiful and moving and reaches far beyond the experience of a six-year-old girl". Jos van der Burg of Het Parool wrote in his review that the film "revolves around adult misunderstanding of children, but the film also masterfully capitalizes on cultural ignorance". Ronald Ockhuysen of De Volkskrant wrote that "Winky's adventures are a tad tame, especially in the scenes where a childless couple takes the girl under their wing. On the other hand, the well-considered tone is a blessing."

Internationally, Variety wrote a positive review but stated "Kidpic 'Winky's Horse' reps a delightful girl-meets-horse story, aimed at tiny tots. Despite its charms, this Holland-set Christmastime fable will have a rough ride finding offshore buyers, even if redubbed for export, given its intensely Dutch frame of reference." DVD Verdict was mixed in their review of the North American DVD release by Peace Arch Entertainment, as they felt that "It's not a magical tale of whimsy and magical whimsical magic, but it is a sweet slice of character drama. Little Ebbie Tam is a sweetheart who is in nearly every scene which gives her plenty to do, but she's up to it. Of course the overwrought dubbing detracts from the effectiveness—a good amount actually—but my, what a smile!"

=== Zwarte Piet ===
In 2022, following the controversies surrounding the blackface appearance of the Zwarte Piet character, Burny Bos said in an interview that the film should not be shown in its current state. Bos later considered altering the film to digitally-replace them with Sooty Pieten, but could not due to budget concerns.

=== Home media ===
The film was released on DVD by Warner Home Video on 25 October 2006. The DVD release features a 12-page photo album, interviews with Mischa Kamp, Eddie Tam and Jan Decleir and trailers for the film and Happy Feet. The film later received a second DVD release on 8 November 2011 by Video/Film Express.

=== Accolades ===
Accolades received by Winky's Horse
Year	Award	Category	Recipient(s)	Result	Ref.
2005	Netherlands Film Festival	Golden Calf for Best Script	Tamara Bos	Won	
2005	Netherlands Film Festival	Golden Calf for Best Feature Film	Burny Bos; Michiel de Rooij; Sabine Veenendaal	Nominated	
2005	Netherlands Film Festival	Golden Calf for Best Supporting Actor	Mamoun Elyounoussi	Nominated	
2005	Netherlands Film Festival	MovieSquad Junior Award	Mischa Kamp	Won	

== See also ==
- List of Dutch films of 2005
- List of films about horses
