= The Boy Who Stopped Talking =

1996 film

De Jongen Die niet meer Praatte
- Theatrical release poster
- Directed by: Ben Sombogaart
- Screenplay by: Lou Brouwers
- Produced by: Burny Bos
- Starring: Erçan Orhan; Halsho Hussain; Rick van Gastel
- Cinematography: Piotr Kukla
- Edited by: Herman P. Koets
- Music by: Nizamettin Ariç
- Production company: Bos Bros. Film & TV Productions
- Distributed by: Hungry Eye Pictures
- Release date: 10 October 1996
- Running time: 108 minutes
- Country: Netherlands
- Languages: Dutch, Kurdish

The Boy Who Stopped Talking (Dutch: De Jongen Die niet meer Praatte) is a 1996 Dutch film directed by Ben Sombogaart.

== Plot ==
Memo is a 9-year-old Kurdish boy. He lives in Eastern Turkey together with his little sister and mother. He is very happy there. His father works in the Netherlands. In the area where Memo lives, war is on the horizon. His father decides to bring his family to the Netherlands. Memo doesn't want to, but nobody asked him anything. From then on, he decides not to talk anymore.

== Cast ==
- Erçan Orhan, Mohammed Akkus (Memo)
- Halsho Hussain as Mustafa
- Brader Musiki as Hüsnü Akkus
- Husna Killi as Fatma Akkus
- Louis Ates as Jeroen Ligthart
- Rick van Gastel as Thomas
- Heleen Hummelen as Inge Smeets
- Peter Bolhuis as Vader Jeroen
- Han Kerckhoffs as Chauffeur school bus
- Shielan Muhammad as Rojda
- Han Oldigs as Arts
- Lava Sulayman as Zin Akkus
- Cecil Toksöz as Kemal Mecan
- Jack Wouterse as Zwart
- Coen van Vrijberghe de Coningh as Politieagent
