= Where Is Winky's Horse? =

2007 film

- Theatrical release poster
- Directed by: Mischa Kamp
- Screenplay by: Tamara Bos
- Based on: Waar is het paard van Sinterklaas? by Tamara Bos
- Produced by: Burny Bos; Michiel de Rooij; Sabine Veenendaal
- Starring: Ebbie Tam; Pim de Pimentel; Jan Decleir
- Cinematography: Jasper Wolf
- Edited by: Sander Vos
- Music by: Johan Hoogewijs
- Production companies: Bos Bros. Film-TV Productions; MMG Film & TV Production; AVRO
- Distributed by: Warner Bros. Pictures
- Release dates: 10 October 2007 (Netherlands); 24 October 2007 (Belgium)
- Running time: 80 minutes
- Countries: Netherlands; Belgium
- Language: Dutch
- Box office: $3.9 million

Where Is Winky's Horse? (Dutch: Waar is het Paard van Sinterklaas?) is a 2007 Dutch-Belgian Sinterklaas drama film directed by Mischa Kamp and written by Tamara Bos, based on her book of the same name. It is the sequel to Winky's Horse (Dutch: Het Paard van Sinterklaas).

The film was released in the Netherlands by Warner Bros. Pictures on 10 October 2007. It received positive reviewsa from critics and won the Golden Film award after it had sold 100,000 cinema tickets.

== Plot ==
Winky Wong lives in the Netherlands for some time after she and her mother immigrated from China to help her father at his Chinese restaurant. She's allowed to take care of Amerigo, the horse of Sinterklaas at Tante Cor and Oom Siem's equestrian facility. (Note: As depicted in Winky's Horse (2005)) despite that, she isn't allowed to ride him due to her size. On her birthday, Cor gives her riding lessons with a pony named Naf-Naf.

At home, Winky's mother announces to her that she is pregnant and that she will get a sibling. However, her mother is beginning to feel sick and she is later admitted to the hospital due to pre-eclampsia. At school, Winky meets Bram, who is fascinated with Indian culture and befriends him.

Sometime later, Winky goes to the equestrian facility to find both Cor and Siem gone. Seeing an opportunity, she secretly takes Amerigo for a ride. Bram arrives with his dog Winnetou, which causes Amerigo to shriek and Winky falls off him. Winky confronts Bram over the incident and he runs off. Realizing that she could get in trouble, she searches for him without any result. She later tells Cor and Siem what happened and explain to her that he will eventually return. Winky's father later tells her that her mother has given birth to girl named Ling.

Bram attempts to talk with Winky, but ignores him. After a conversation with delivery driver Samir, who had a similar situation when he broke up with his girlfriend Sofie. she decides to reconcile with Bram and he helps on her search to find Amerigo.

On the day when Sinterklaas and his Zwarte Pieten arrive in the village during the annual parade, Winky notices Amerigo's red lint on a motorcycle. Sofie, who reconciled with Samir, tells her that the motorcycle belongs to Oom Jacob, a horse enthusiast. Winky chases after the motorcycle, but misses it. Samir offers her a ride to his home address and they eventually find Amerigo in Jacob's backyard.

Sinterklaas arrives at the equestrian facility and discovers with delight that Amerigo has given birth to a colt. While writing a letter, Winky writes that she's grateful that Amerigo has returned.

== Cast ==
- Ebbie Tam as Winky Wong
- Aaron Wan as Vader Winky
- Hanyi Han as Moeder Winky
- Pim de Pimentel as Bram
- Jan Decleir as Oom Siem/Sinterklaas
- Betty Schuurman as Tante Cor
- Mamoun Elyounoussi as Samir
- Sallie Harmsen as Sofie
- Peter Bolhuis as Vader Sofie
- Anneke Blok as Juf Sigrid
- Nils Verkooijen as Joris
- Marcel Musters as Dokter
- Ezra Koldenhof as Frederik
- Eric van der Donk as Oom Jacob
- Harry van Rijthoven as Burgermeester
- Naomi Sapoen as Ling

== Release ==
=== Home media ===
The film was released on DVD and Blu-ray by Warner Home Video on 22 October 2008.

=== Accolades ===
Accolades received by Winky's Horse
Year	Award	Category	Recipient(s)	Result	Ref.
2007	Netherlands Film Festival	Golden Calf for Best Supporting Actress	Betty Schuurman	Nominated	

== See also ==
- List of films about horses
