= Gijs Naber =

Dutch actor (born 1980)

- Naber in 2026
- Born: 9 August 1980 (age 46)
- Occupation: Actor

Gijs Naber (Dutch: [ɣɛis ˈnaːbər]; born 9 August 1980) is a Dutch actor. He has appeared in more than thirty films since 1998.

He succeeded Stefan de Walle as Sinterklaas in November 2026.

== Filmography ==
Year	Title	Role	Notes
2009	The Last Days of Emma Blank	Meier	
2010	Loft	Robert Hartman	
2011	The Heineken Kidnapping	Cor	
2014	Aanmodderfakker	Thijs	
2015	Homies	Felix	
2015	Jack bestelt een broertje	Willy	
2017	Het Verlangen	Marc Goudemondt	
2017	Tulipani, Love, Honour and a Bicycle	Gauke	
2017	Oh Baby	Ruben	
2018	Redbad	Redbad	
2018	My Foolish Heart	Detective Lucas	
2019	Judas	Willem Holleeder	6 episodes
2021	The Story of My Wife	Jakob Störr	
2022	Met Mes		
2026−present	Het Sinterklaasjournaal	Sinterklaas	

== Awards ==
- Golden Calf for Best Actor (2014) for Aanmodderfakker
