= Golden Calf for Best Script =

List of award winners

The following is a list of winners of the Golden Calf for best script at the NFF. This category was awarded since 1999.

- 2026 Truly Naked - Muriel D'ansembourg
- 2025 Our Girls - Mike van Diem
- 2024 Dit is geen kerstfilm - Lotte Tabbers & Isis Mihrimad Cabolet
- 2023 El Houb - Shariff Nasr & Philip Delmaar
- 2022 Do Not Hesitate - Jolein Laarman
- 2021 The Judgement - Bert Bouma & Sander Burger
- 2020 Romy's Salon - Tamara Bos
- 2019 About That Life - Jeroen Scholten van Aschat & Shady El-Hamus
- 2018 In Blue - Jaap van Heusden & Jan Willem den Bok
- 2017 Bram Fischer - Jean van de Velde
- 2016 The Paradise Suite - Joost van Ginkel
- 2015 Son of Mine - Gustaaf Peek
- 2014 How To Avoid Everything - Anne Barnhoorn
- 2013 Borgman - Alex van Warmerdam
- 2012 Plan C - Max Porcelijn
- 2011 Brownian Movement - Nanouk Leopold
- 2010 Joy - Helena van der Meulen
- 2009 The Last Days of Emma Blank - Alex van Warmerdam
- 2008 Het zusje van Katia (Katia's Sister) - Jan Eilander & Jolein Laarman
- 2007 Nightwatching - Peter Greenaway
- 2006 Ober - Alex van Warmerdam
- 2005 Het Paard van Sinterklaas - Tamara Bos
- 2004 Ellis In Glamourland - Mischa Alexander
- 2003 Van God Los - Pieter Kuijpers & Paul Jan Nelissen
- 2002 The Discovery of Heaven - Edwin de Vries
- 2001 Met Grote Blijdschap - Lodewijk Crijns en Kim van Kooten
- 2000 Lek - Jean van de Velde & Simon de Waal
- 1999 Missing Link - Ger Poppelaars & Timo Veldkamp
