= Jacobus en Corneel =

Flemish television series

- Genre: Children's TV show
- Written by: Bob Davidse
- Country of origin: Belgium
- Original language: Dutch
- No. of episodes: 30

Production
- Running time: 10–15 minutes

Original release
- Network: BRT (nowadays the VRT)
- Release: 1982 – 1984

Jacobus en Corneel is a Flemish children's slapstick series from the 1980s featuring the exploits of two handymen. It was originally broadcast between 1982 and 1984 on BRT (nowadays the VRT) every Tuesday and Friday around 18.20 in the evening.

== Concept ==
Jacobus is tall and quite serious; Corneel is short and jolly but clumsy. They're housemates unless they're called to fix something up. Both men wear caps and blue overalls over a white shirt. They travel by tandem bicycle.

The outdoor shots were done in the Pajottenland, while studio shots were made in Bonheiden. Rather than featuring dialogue, the episodes were narrated by a voice-over. In terms of personalities and comedy, Jacobus and Corneel were comparable to Laurel & Hardy and the Dutch 1970s duo Peppi & Kokki.

== Cast ==
- Jacobus: Jappe Claes
- Corneel: Jos Kennis
- Narrator: Nolle Versyp.
- Female roles: Marleen Merckx

== Adaptations ==
In 1985 a comic book was made based on the TV show. It was drawn by Luc Morjeau and Yaack.

Jaak Lamoen also published a children's novel about the characters.

== Aftermath ==
Actor Jos Kennis died on July 15, 2009.
