= Craving (2018 film) =

2018 film

- Film poster
- Directed by: Saskia Diesing
- Written by: Saskia Diesing; Esther Gerritsen
- Produced by: Hans de Wolf; Hanneke Niens
- Starring: Elise van 't Laar; Simone Kleinsma; Leopold Witte; Stefan de Walle
- Cinematography: Aage Hollander
- Edited by: Axel Skovdal Roelofs
- Music by: Paul Eisenach
- Distributed by: Splendid Film
- Release dates: 29 January 2018 (IFF Rotterdam); 15 March 2018 (Netherlands)
- Running time: 95 minutes
- Country: Netherlands
- Language: Dutch
- Box office: $79,663

Craving (Dutch: Dorst) is a 2018 Dutch comedy film directed by Saskia Diesing. It is based on the book of the same name, written by Esther Gerritsen. In July 2018, it was one of nine films shortlisted to be the Dutch entry for the Best Foreign Language Film at the 91st Academy Awards, but it was not selected.

== Cast ==
- Simone Kleinsma as Elisabeth
- Elise van 't Laar as Coco
- Leopold Witte as Hans
- Stefan de Walle as Wilbert
