= Jacques Vriens =

Dutch writer (born 1946)

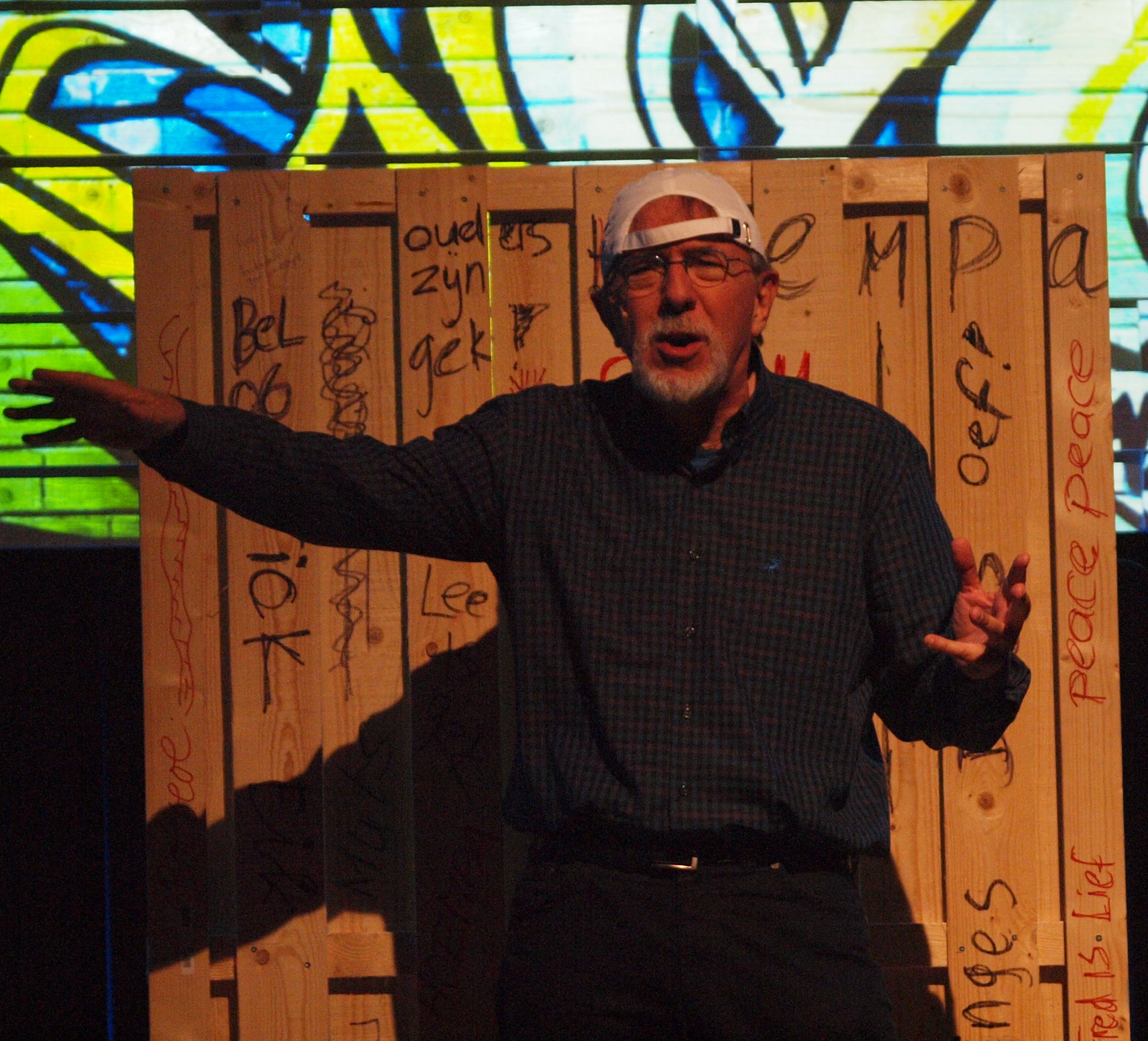
- Vriens in 2015
- Born: 26 March 1946 (age 80) 's-Hertogenbosch
- Occupations: Writer, playwright
- Spouse: Thérèse Vriens
- Writing career
- Language: Dutch
- Period: 1976–present
- Genres: Children's fiction, theater
- Notable works: Achtste-groepers huilen niet, Oorlogsgeheimen
- Website: www.jacquesvriens.nl

Jacques Vriens (born 26 March 1946) is a Dutch children's author and playwright. He is known for his 1999 book Achtste-groepers huilen niet, which was twice adapted into a film. Vriens formerly worked as a schoolteacher and has written for the show Tien torens diep. In 2001 he was appointed to the Order of the Netherlands Lion by Queen Beatrix.

== Works adapted ==
- Tien torens diep (Ten Towers Deep) (2004 book; 2009 television series)
- Achtste-groepers huilen niet (Eighth Graders Don't Cry, Kule Kidz Gråter Ikke, Cool Kids Don't Cry) (1999 book; 2012 film; 2014 film)
- Oorlogsgeheimen (Secrets of War) (2007 book; 2014 film)

== Bibliography ==
- Die rotschool met die fijne klas (1976)
- Jules is de beste (1976)
- Ik wil mijn poes terug (1977)
- Zondagmorgen (1978)
- Geen schoenen voor Bram (1980)
- Een stelletje mooie vrienden (1981)
- Een geheim konijn (1982)
- Dag, Sinterklaasje (1983)
- O, denneboom (1984)
- De zesde tegen het soepie (1984)
- De vader-en-moeder-wedstrijd (1985)
- Willem en Dikke Teun (1985)
- Speelwerkbrief : thema : dieren (1985)
- Zaterdagmorgen; Zondagmorgen (1986)
- Tommie en Lotje : lieve en stoute verhalen voor kleuters (1986)
- Tommie en Lotje lopen weg en andere lieve en stoute verhalen (1987)
- Ik wil mijn poes terug; Geen schoenen voor Bram (1987)
- Het achtste groepie tegen het soepie (1988)
- Een bende in de bovenbouw (1988)
- Drie ei is een paasei (1989)
- Eindelijk actie (1990)
- Bonje in het bonshotel (1990)
- Tommie en Lotje vangen een koe en andere lieve en stoute verhalen (1990)
- Tinus-in-de-war (1990)
- Ha/Bah naar school (1991)
- Ik ben ook op jou (1992)
- Het raadsel van de regenboog (1992)
- Ik doe niet meer mee en andere verhalen (1993)
- Tommie en Lotje vinden een schat en andere lieve en stoute verhalen (1994)
- Alex krijgt een baby (1994)
- Napoleon (1994)
- Napoleon, de stoerste kater van de hele buurt (1994)
- En de groeten van groep acht (1994)
- Vieze Nol (1995)
- Menno zet zijn schoenen (1995)
- Meester Jaap (1996)
- Grootmoeder, wat heb je grote oren... : klassieke sprookjes opnieuw verteld voor jonge kinderen (1996)
- Ga jij maar op de gang (1996)
- Nog één nachtje slapen (1996)
- Menno sluit weer vrienden (1996)
- Geheime vrienden (1997)
- Meester Jaap doet het weer (1997)
- De gekste avonturen van Tommie en Lotje (1997)
- Weg uit de Peel (1997)
- Vaders, moeders? Hardgekookte eieren! (1998)
- Meester Jaap gaat nooit verloren (1998)
- Allemaal poppenkast (1998)
- De stoutste avonturen van Tommie en Lotje (1998)
- Ik wil geen vingers meer zien! : schoolverhalen voor kinderen van 7 tot 10 jaar (1999)
- Jij bent een kip! (1999)
- Achtste-groepers huilen niet (1999)
- Tommie en Lotje gaan op vakantie (1999)
- Meester Jaap gaat naar het Kinderboekenmuseum (1999)
- De dikke Meester Jaap (2000)
- Lieve dikke juffrouw Jans (2000)
- Poes is weg (2000)
- Het geheim van de verliefde hulpkok (2000)
- De verdwijning van de mislukte barbie (2000)
- De liefste avonturen van Tommie en Lotje (2000)
- Menno december-omnibus (2000)
- De redding van de zwevende oma (2001)
- De vrolijkste avonturen van Tommie en Lotje (2001)
- O, mijn lieve Augustijn (2001)
- De vondst van het stiekeme circus (2001)
- De spannendste avonturen van Tommie en Lotje (2002)
- De school is weg! (2002)
- Meester Jaap maakt er een puinhoop van (2002)
- De jacht op de afgepakte sterren (2003)
- Jelle en de baby (2003)
- Jelle en de maan (2003)
- Jelle en de klok (2003)
- Jelle en de trein (2003)
- Napoleon, de stoerste kater (2003)
- Tien torens diep : een verhaal over vriendschap (2004)
- P.S. Ik ben uw dochter (2004)
- De ontmaskering van de zingende hotelrat (2004)
- Jelle en de bal (2004)
- Jelle en de luier (2004)
- De dikke bende van De Korenwolf (2005)
- De ontvoering van de zwarte prinses (2006)
- Meester Jaap houdt van iedereen (meestal...) (2006)
- De dikke bende van de Korenwolf 2 (2007)
- Oorlogsgeheimen (2007). Archeon Jeugdboekenprijs 2009
- De vlucht van de knorrige kelner (2009)
- Groep acht aan de macht (2009)
- Het geheime weekboek van groep 8 (2010)
- De ontsnapping van de brullende muis (2011)
- Meester Jaap is een held (op sokken!) (2011)
- Is de klas nog wel zo gelukkig? (2011)
- Het geheim van de zoenende gasten (2011)
- Het geheime weekboek van groep 8 (2012)
- Strijd om de kathedraal (2012)

== Theater productions ==
- Grootmoeders grote oren (2008)
- De bende van de Korenwolf (2008)
- Moeders knie (2010–2012)
- Achtste-groepers huilen niet (2011–2012)
- De bende van de Korenwolf – Het geheim van de zoenende gasten (2011–2013)
- Hoe verzint-ie het toch allemaal? (2012)
- Oorlogsgeheimen (2013)
- De rijke bramenplukker en 3 sprookjes voor volwassenen van Godfried Bomans (2013)
