= Burny Bos =

Dutch producer, screenwriter and writer (1944–2023)

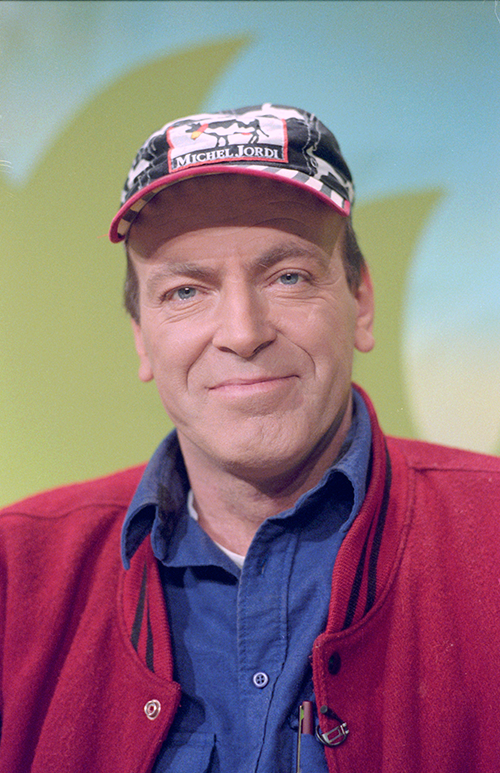
- Bos in 1991
- Born: Bernard Gerrit Bos; 8 April 1944; Haarlem, German-occupied Netherlands
- Died: 1 December 2023 (aged 79); Amsterdam, Netherlands
- Occupations: Film producer; screenwriter; actor; author
- Years active: 1974–2023
- Children: 5, including Tamara Bos
- Website: bosbros.com

Bernard Gerrit "Burny" Bos (8 April 1944 – 1 December 2023) was a Dutch film producer, screenwriter and children's book writer. He also worked as an actor in children's programs on radio and television.

== Life and career ==
Bos started working with the AVRO-radio. In 1975 he received an honorable mention from the "Zilveren Reissmicrofoon" jury for the Ko de boswachtershow (radio) and in 1977 for Radio Lawaaipapegaai. In 1981 the Zilveren Nipkowschijf jury gave him another honorable mention for the TV series Lawaaipapegaai. In 1983 he received the Zilveren Reissmicrofoon for his entire radio oeuvre.

From 1984 to 1989, Bos was the head of the youth department in the VPRO. Under his supervision programs like Theo en Thea, Mevrouw Ten Kate, Max Laadvermogen, Rembo en Rembo, Achterwerk in de kast and Buurman Bolle developed. In 1989 he began his own production company Bos Bros. with his brother Frank and he signed another year contract with the AVRO.

For the AVRO he produced programs and films like The Pocket-knife, Kinderen van waterland, Dag Juf, tot morgen, de Ko de boswachtershow, Hoe laat begint het schilderij, Mijn Franse tante Gazeuse and Otje. He was proclaimed as the "broadcaster of the year" in 1998.

In recent years, he was focused on producing films. Working with his production company in partnership with Warner Bros. Entertainment, he produced several film adaptations of books written by Annie M.G. Schmidt. He received the Gouden Calf film prize for the best feature film in 1999 with The Flying Liftboy (Abeltje) and in 2002 with Miss Minoes (Minoes). Schmidt's books Otje and Ibbeltje were adapted into a television series.

Burny Bos was the guest of honor at the Netherlands Film Festival in late September 2007. For that occasion, he asked director Diederik van Rooijen to direct the short film Een trui voor kip Saar .

Bos also showed that he was worried about the future of the youth film in the Netherlands. Quality films are becoming increasingly difficult to make. According to him, the children's genre on television and in the cinema suffers from "ploppification".

Bos died of mesothelioma on 1 December 2023, at the age of 79.

== Filmography ==
=== Producer ===
==== Film ====
- The Pocket-knife (Het Zakmes, 1992)
- The Boy Who Stopped Talking (De Jongen Die niet meer Praatte, 1996)
- Mijn Franse tante Gazeuse (1997)
- The Flying Liftboy (Abeltje, 1998)
- Miss Minoes (Minoes, 2001)
- Yes Nurse! No Nurse! (Ja zuster, Nee zuster, 2002)
- Winky's Horse (Het Paard van Sinterklaas, 2005)
- Gruesome School Trip (De Griezelbus, 2005)
- Where Is Winky's Horse? (Waar is het Paard van Sinterklaas?, 2007)
- Morrison Gets a Baby Sister (2008)
- Hoe overleef ik mezelf? (2008)
- The Indian (2009)
- Alfie, the Little Werewolf (Dolfje Weerwolfje, 2011)
- Fidgety Bram (Brammetje Baaz, 2012)
- The Zigzag Kid (Nono, Het Zigzag Kind, 2012)
- Chez Nous (2013)
- Sickos (Kankerlijers, 2014)
- Wiplala (2014)
- Meester Kikker (2016)
- Adios Amigos (2016)
- Heinz (2019)
- Romy's Salon (Kapsalon Romy, 2019)
- Rocco & Sjuul (2023)
- Tummy Tom and the Lost Teddy Bear (Dikkie Dik en de verdwenen knuffel, posthumous, 2024)
- Dikkie Dik 2: Een nieuwe vriend voor Dikkie Dik (posthumous, 2024)
- Miss Moxy (posthumous, 2025)

==== Executive/co-producer ====
- My Brother Is a Dog (2004)
- Ben X (2007)
- Frogs & Toads (Kikkerdril, 2009)
- Allez, Eddy (2013)
- Marionette (co-producer, 2020)
- Lucy Wanted (Lucy ist jetzt Gangster, 2022)

=== Television ===
- Kinderen van Waterland (1990)
- The Little Polar Bear (1992-1995)
- Captain Cockpit' (1994)
- Dag juf, tot morgen (1995)
- Always yours, for never (1996)
- Otje (1998)
- Cowboy from Iran (Cowboy uit Iran, 1999)
- Knofje (2001)
- Ibbeltje (2004)
- Circus Waltz (2006)

=== Acting roles ===
- Studio Lawaaipapegaai (1978–1982) - Himself
- Opzoek naar Yolanda (1984) - Lange Jaap
- Villa Achterwerk (1984–1985) - Lange Jaap
- Buurman Bolle (1989) - Narrator
- Ko de Boswachtershow (1990–1994) - Ko de Boswachter
- Dikkie Dik en de verdwenen knuffel (2024) - Narrator, posthumous

== Radio ==
- Ko de Boswachtershow (1974-1984)
- Radio Lawaaipapegaai (1976-1978)

== Bibliography ==
- Knofje, waar zit je? (1980)
- Oma Fladder (1981)
- Klim maar op mijn rug zei de krokodil (1982)
- Circus Grote Meneer (1985)
- Professor Koosje (1986)
- Bonkie en Uk (1987)
- Kikker in je bil die er nooit meer uit wil (1987)
- Professor Koosje bolleboosje (1987)
- De groeten van Knofje (1988)
- Dubbeldik zand op je boterham (1990)
- Mijn vader woont in Rio (1990)
- Valentino de kikker (1990)
- Familie Mol-de-Mol staat er goed op (1994)
- Bij de familie Mol-de-Mol is alles oké (1995)
- Familie Mol-de-Mol zit hoog en droog (1995)
- Ot Jan Dikkie! (1997)
- Alexander de Grote, Pluim van de maand (January 2001)
