= Ben Sombogaart =

Dutch film director

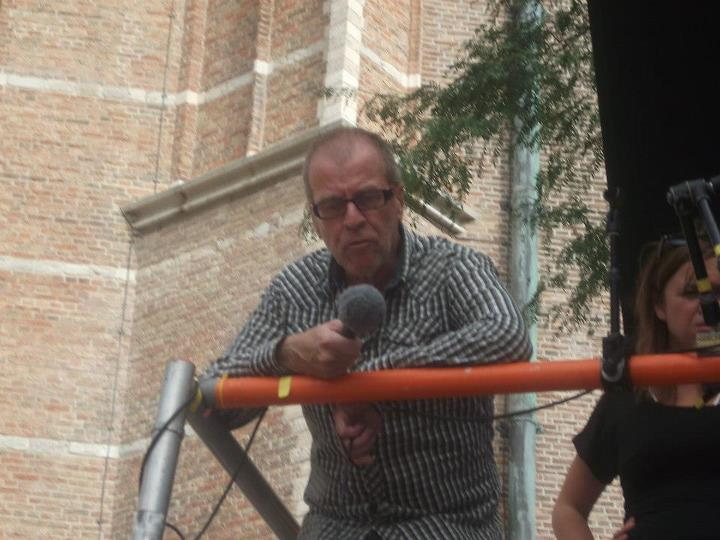
- Born: 8 August 1947 (age 77); Amsterdam, Netherlands
- Occupation: director
- Children: Boris and Kevin (twins, 1987)

Bernard Cornelis (Ben) Sombogaart (born 8 August 1947) is a Dutch film and TV director.

His film Twin Sisters (2002) was nominated for the Academy Award for Best Foreign Language Film.

== Filmography ==
- The Pocket-knife (Het Zakmes, 1992)
- The Boy Who Stopped Talking (De Jongen Die niet meer Praatte, 1996)
- The Flying Liftboy (Abeltje, 1998)
- Twin Sisters (De Tweeling, 2002)
- Tow Truck Pluck (Pluk van de Petteflet, 2004)
- Crusade in Jeans (Kruistocht in Spijkerbroek, 2006)
- Bride Flight (2008)
- The Storm (De Storm, 2009) – film about North Sea flood of 1953
- Isabelle (2011)
- Moordvrouw (2012-)
- In My Father's Garden (Knielen Op Een Bed Violen, 2016)
- Rafaël (2018)
- My Best Friend Anne Frank (Mijn Beste Vriendin Anne Frank, 2021)
- Tegendraads (2024)
