= In the Air (film distributor) =

Dutch film distributor

In The Air
- Type: Naamloze vennootschap
- Industry: Film
- Founded: 2012; 14 years ago
- Headquarters: Heemstede, Netherlands
- Products: Motion pictures
- Website: intheair.nl

In The Air is a Dutch independent film distributor specializing in the distribution of family and children's films.

== History ==
In 2018, Source 1 Media signed a deal with In The Air to handle home media distribution for their releases.

In 2022, Dennis Zuijdervliet was hired as the general manager of the company.

== Filmography ==
=== Dutch films ===
- The Amazing Wiplala (2014)
- Adios Amigos (2016) (Home media distribution and international sales only)
- Sing Song (2017)
- Strijder (2022)
- Tummy Tom and the Lost Teddy Bear (2024)
- De Grote Sinterklaasfilm: Stampij in de bakkerij (2024)
- K3 en Het Lied van de Zeemeermin (2024)
