= Peter Bolhuis =

Dutch actor (born 1954)

- Born: 14 January 1954 (age 71)
- Occupation: Actor

Peter Bolhuis (Born 14 January 1954) is a Dutch actor, with appearances in many films and TV serials.

== Selected filmography ==
- Amsterdam Vice (2019)
- Whitefish (TV movie) (2009) as Joustra
- Where Is Winky's Horse? (2007) as Vader Sofie
- De hel van Tanger (2006) as Jack
- Winky's Horse (2005) as Vader Sofie
- All Souls (2005) as Portier 1
- Anne Frank: The Whole Story (TV miniseries) (2001) as Victor Kugler
- Quidam, Quidam (1999) as Old Master Duivik
- The Boy Who Stopped Talking (1996) as Vader Jeroen
- Romeo (1990) as Chiel
- Schakels (TV movie) (1983)
