= Adios Amigos (film) =

2016 film directed by Albert Jan van Rees

- Film poster
- Directed by: Albert Jan van Rees
- Written by: Anne Barnhoorn
- Produced by: Burny Bos
- Starring: Martijn Lakemeier; Yannick van de Velde; Geert Lageveen
- Cinematography: Dennis Wielaert
- Edited by: Sándor Soeteman
- Production companies: BosBros.; Fobic Films
- Distributed by: Dutch FilmWorks
- Release date: 8 September 2016
- Country: Netherlands
- Language: Dutch
- Box office: $94,509

Adios Amigos is a 2016 comedy-drama film directed by Albert Jan van Rees. It is a remake of the 2011 Belgian film Come as You Are. It was listed as one of eleven films that could be selected as the Dutch submission for the Best Foreign Language Film at the 89th Academy Awards, but it was not nominated.

== Cast ==
- Martijn Lakemeier as Lars
- Yannick van de Velde as Philip
- Geert Lageveen as Henk
- Juul Vrijdag as Mieke
- Margot Ros as Lub
- Bas Hoeflaak as Joost
