= Jolijn van de Wiel =

Dutch actress (born 1992)

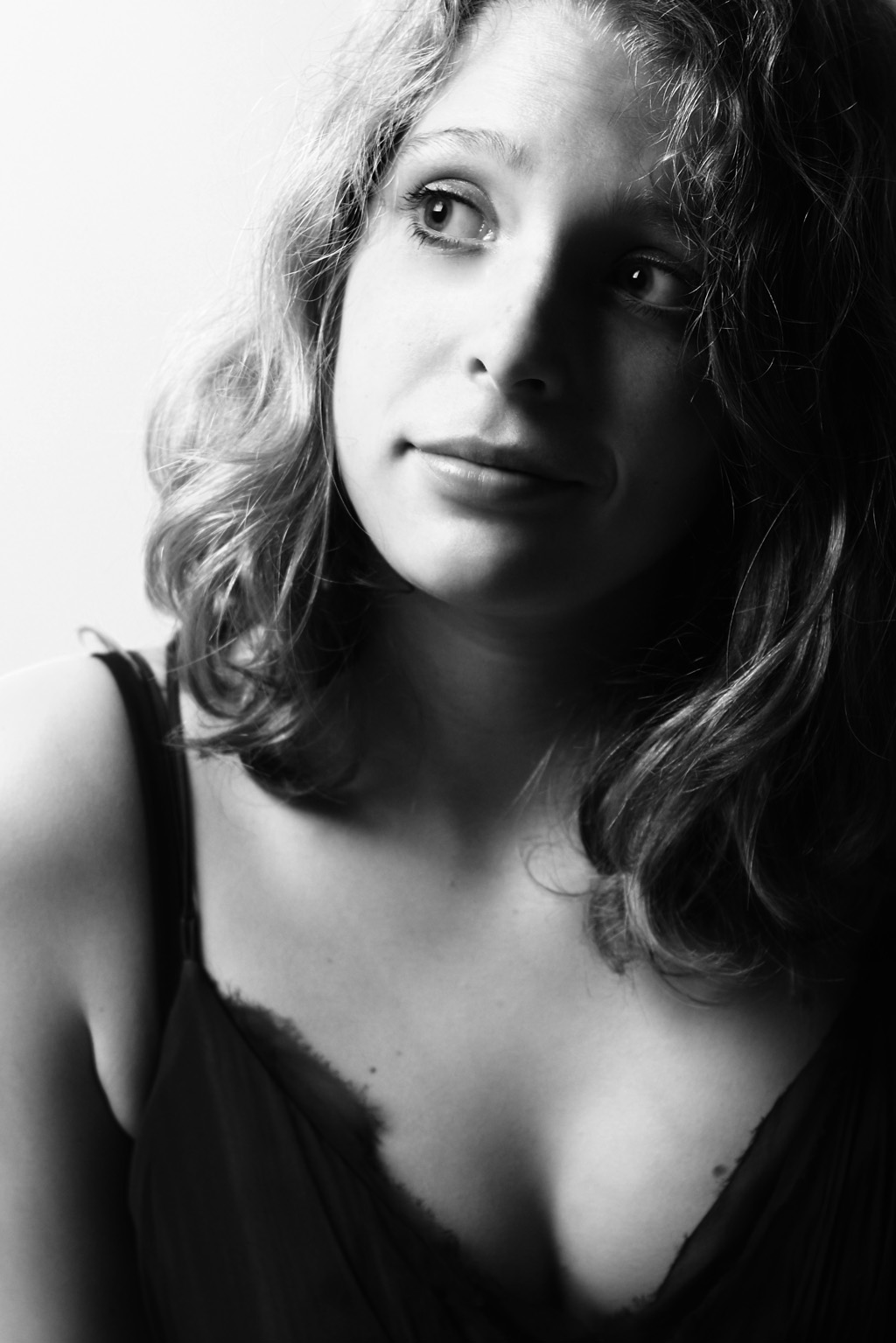
- Born: 21 September 1992 (age 32); Drunen, The Netherlands

Jolijn van de Wiel (born 21 September 1992) is a Dutch actress. She made her first appearance in the film Hoe overleef ik mezelf? (How to survive myself), where she played the role of the anxious and sensitive Rosa. The film was based on the book series of Francine Oomen, bearing the same title.

Before she made the step to the big screen, Jolijn gained acting experience by playing in several school musicals.

After the summer of 2009, she will be appearing as a guest in the VARA series Kinderen geen bezwaar.

== Films/TV ==
- Kinderen geen bezwaar (2009) - Chantal (guest role)
- Hoe overleef ik mezelf? (2008) - Rosa van Dijk
