= Mamoun Elyounoussi =

Dutch actor of Moroccan descent

- Born: Mamoun Elyounoussi; June 23, 1987 (age 39); Amsterdam, The Netherlands
- Occupation: Actor
- Years active: 2003–present

'Mamoun' Elyounoussi (born June 23, 1987) is a Dutch actor of Moroccan descent. His early roles include Polleke and Winky's Horse.

== Early life, family and education ==
Elyounoussi was born in Amsterdam. He plays Mamoun on Sesamstraat, the Dutch co-production of Sesame Street.

Mamoun is Elvan's boyfriend and a good friend of the Muppets. He is also the paperboy on the street.

== Career ==
Mamoun Elyounoussi began performing as a child actor.

He was nominated for the Golden Calf Award for Best Supporting Actor in 2005 for his performance in Het Paard van Sinterklaas. His first adult role was in Coach (2009).

== Roles ==
- Polleke (2003) as Mimoun (film)
- Het paard van Sinterklaas (2005; Winky's Horse) as Samir (film)
- Waar is het paard van Sinterklaas? (2007; Where Is Winky's Horse?) as Samir (film)
- Roes (2008; Flush) as Omar (television series; 1 episode)
- We gaan nog niet naar huis (2008; We're not going home yet) as Ab (television series; 4 episodes)
- Coach (2009) as Soukri (film)
- Prooi (2016; Prey) as Roti delivery driver (film)
- Mocro Maffia (2018) as Gladde
- Amsterdamned II (2025)
