= How to Avoid Everything =

2014 film

- Directed by: Michiel ten Horn
- Starring: Gijs Naber; Yannick van de Velde
- Release date: 30 September 2014 (NFF)
- Running time: 100 minutes
- Country: Netherlands
- Language: Dutch

How To Avoid Everything (Dutch: Aanmodderfakker) is a 2014 Dutch comedy film directed by Michiel ten Horn. The film won 3 Golden Calves for Best Feature Film, Best Actor (Naber) and Best Screenplay.

== Plot ==
Thijs, an immature man in his thirties, refuses to grow up and lives the life of a student.

== Cast ==
- Gijs Naber as Thijs
- Yannick van de Velde as Walter
- Roos Wiltink as Lisa
- Anniek Pheifer as Simone
- Markoesa Hamer as Julie
