= Jet Boeke =

Dutch writer and illustrator

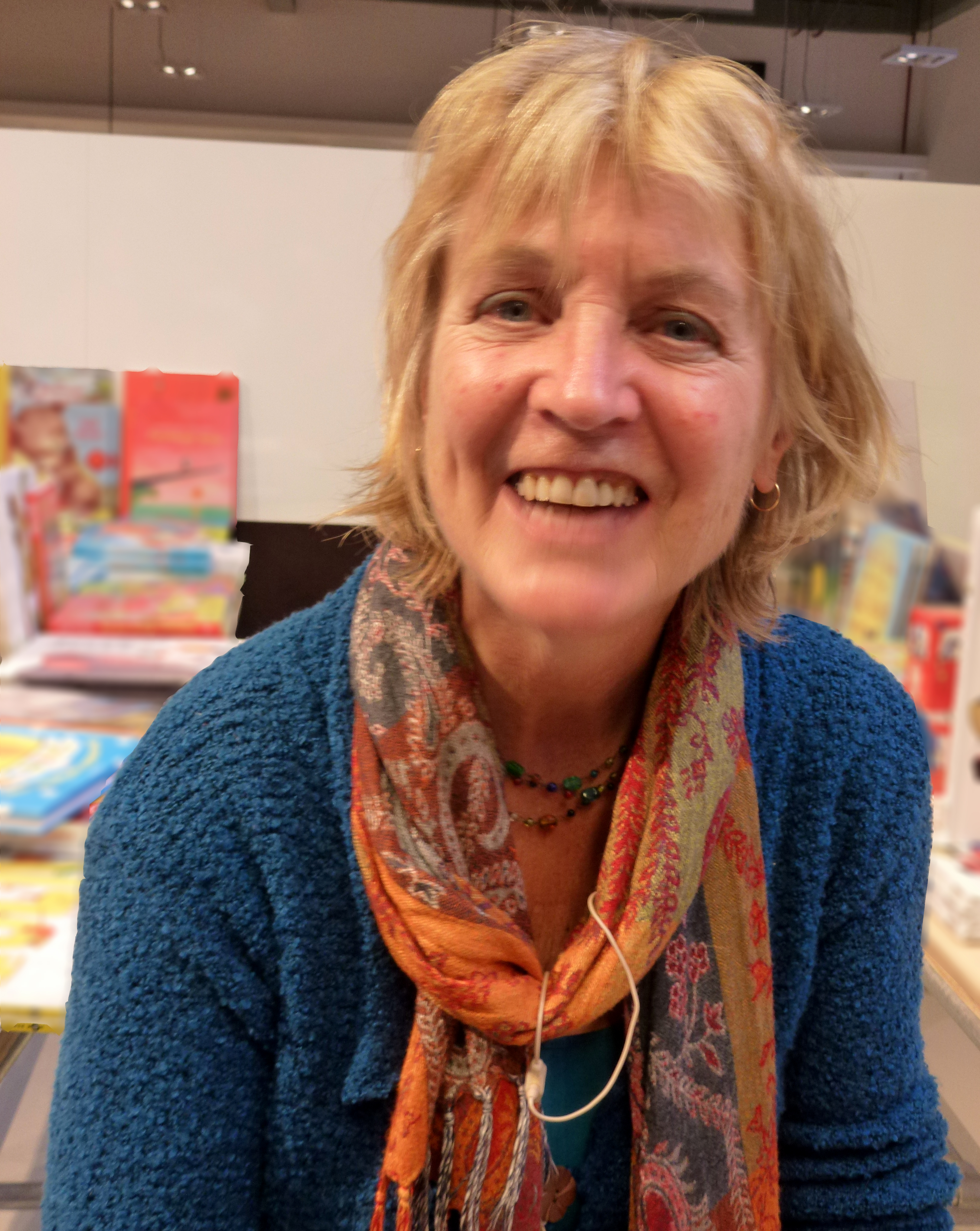
Boeke in 2014

Jet Boeke (born October 28, 1948, Wageningen) is a Dutch children's author and illustrator. She is a contributor to the Dutch version of Sesame Street, and is famous worldwide for her book series Dikkie Dik.

== Biography ==
When Jet Boeke was younger, she traveled through central and South America. During that time she would sometimes make portraits of people in exchange for food or shelter. During this time, she had met an American illustrator who worked for Sesame Street. She had seen the children for the first time on American television and was immediately very enthusiastic about it. Back in the Netherlands, Sesame Street had just been getting started and was slowly becoming popular. She had then gotten in touch with the Sesame Street program. They had asked her to come up with a new idea for the show, and she had suggested that the show read picture books to the audience of the show. The idea of hers had been approved, and the protagonist of the story ended up being her cat, Dikkie Dik.

Her cat plays as a huge influence and inspiration to Jet Boeke. Every year, she makes a new series of picture books for Sesame Street by making the stories and then sketch out the drawings. She wishes for the drawings to speak for themselves without any words. After Dikki Dik books would show up for years on television, a demand for them began in regular bookstores.
