= Achtste Groepers Huilen Niet =

- Theatrical release poster
- Directed by: Dennis Bots
- Written by: Karin van Holst Pellekaan, Jacques Vriens
- Based on: Achtste-groepers huilen niet by Jacques Vriens
- Starring: Hanna Obbeek, Nils Verkooijen, Fiona Livingston
- Cinematography: Gerd Schelfhout
- Edited by: Philippe Ravoet
- Music by: Johan Hoogewijs
- Production companies: Bijker Productions; Rinkel Film; Evangelische Omroep
- Distributed by: Dutch FilmWorks
- Release date: 15 February 2012 (Netherlands)
- Running time: 96 minutes
- Country: Netherlands
- Language: Dutch

Achtste Groepers Huilen Niet (English: Sixth Graders Don't Cry, also known as Cool Kids Don't Cry) is a 2012 family drama that was directed by Dennis Bots. The film is an adaptation of the Dutch book of the same name by Jacques Vriens. It was first released into cinemas in the Netherlands on February 15, 2012, and has won a 2012 Golden Film Award.

== Synopsis ==
Akkie (pronounced as Ah-key) (Hanna Obbeek) is an 6th grade student. In her free time she enjoys to play soccer. She has a few good friends and likes most of the kids in her class. However, there is one boy she hates. His name is Joep (pronounced as Yoop) and the two have a row every other day. But one day, when the class plays football during lunch break, Joep goes too far and hurts Elise, Akkie's best friend. Akkie wants to take revenge and after school, Joep and Akkie start a fight. The fight ends soon, because their teachers finds out about it. Akkies nose is bleeding when she returns home. Later that evening, her nose spontaneously starts bleeding again. Her mother is worried and takes her daughter to see a doctor. Things take a turn for the tragic when Akkie discovers she has leukemia. Despite this, Akkie tries to keep busy helping prepare for the next soccer tournament. Her friends support her, but Akkie is discouraged when she has to spend several days in the hospital. Still, she is desperate to go on a school camp where she plays various games. When they play hide and seek, Akkie hides in a tree. She cannot come down herself and eventually Joep climbs in the tree to help her get down. From that moment on, the two are friends. The next day, Akkie suddenly passes out. She has to be taken to hospital.

Akkie starts chemotherapy, but because the leukemia is so aggressive, Akkie begins to realize that she probably will not survive. In an emotional scene, Akkie learns that the cancer has spread to her brain and that she has a terminal illness. She asks her best friend Elise (Fiona Livingston) to play on her behalf in the soccer tournament, since she knows she will not be able to attend the tournament on her own. This leads her teammates to play an impromptu game at the hospital, where Akkie’s bed is in a room facing the field so she can watch the game. Happily watching them play, Akkie dies peacefully. Her classmates will honor Akkie in the school tournament, where she attends in spirit through her classmates wearing her name on their uniforms and banners throughout the area.

== Cast ==
- Hanna Obbeek as Akkie
- Nils Verkooijen as Joep
- Fiona Livingston as Elise
- Bram Flick as Laurens
- Amin Belyandouz as Brammetje
- Eva Van Der Gucht as Juf Ina
- Loek Peters as Dokter Snor
- Johanna ter Steege as Moeder Akkie
- Reinout Bussemaker as Vader Akkie
- Chris Comvalius as Afida
- Xander Straat as Meester Henk
- Bram van der Hooven as Frenklin
- Lea Vlastra as Tamara
- Renee de Graaff as Christel
- Lucas Dijker as Rico

== Reception ==
=== Awards ===
- Golden Film Award (2012, won)
- Golden Calf Audience Award at the Nederlands Film Festival (2012, won)
- Rembrandt Award for Best Dutch Youth Film (2012, won)
- Rembrandt Award for Best Dutch Actress (2012, nominated - Hanna Obbeek)
- Rembrandt Award for Best Film Song (2012, nominated - Kim-Lian van der Meij)
- Audience Award for Best Feature Film at the TIFF Kids (2013, won)
- Best Children's Film at the China International Children's Film Festival (2013, won)
