= Tamara Bos =

Dutch screenwriter (born 1967)

Tamara Bos (born 13 August 1967, Ede) is a Dutch screenwriter who won the Golden Calf for Best Script for Winky's Horse. She is the daughter of film producer Burny Bos.

== Partial filmography ==
- Mijn Franse tante Gazeuse (1997)
- Minoes (2001)
- Hidden Flaws (film) (2004)
- Tow Truck Pluck (Pluk van de Petteflet, 2004)
- Diep (2005)
- Winky's Horse (Het Paard van Sinterklaas, 2005)
- Where Is Winky's Horse? (Waar is het Paard van Sinterklaas, 2007)
- Hoe overleef ik mezelf? (2008)
- Brammetje Baas (2012)

== TV ==
- Cowboy from Iran
