= Luv' discography =

- Studio albums: 6
- Main compilation albums: 5
- Remix album: 1
- Mini album: 2
- Singles: 43

This is the discography and videography of Dutch girl group Luv'.

== Discography ==
=== Studio albums ===
List of studio albums, with selected chart positions
Title	Album details	Peak chart positions							Certifications
Title	Album details	NLD Album Top 100	NLD LP Top 50	BE Billboard Chart	AUT	GER	SWI	DK	Certifications
With Luv'	Released: August 1978; Label: Phonogram/Philips	8	6	—	15	50	11	9	NVPI: Gold and Platinum; IFPI Danmark: Silver
Lots of Luv'	Released: May 1979; Label: Phonogram/Philips	4	7	6	13	39	11	8	NVPI: Gold and Platinum
True Luv'	Released: December 1979; Label: CNR/Carrere	7	13	—	—	—	—	—	—: NVPI: Gold
Forever Yours	Released: December 1980; Label: CNR/Carrere	5	13	—	—	—	—	—	—
Sincerely Yours	Released: April 1991; Label: RCA/BMG	—	—	—	—	—	—	—	—
All You Need Is Luv'	Released: February 1994; Label: Roman Disc	—	—	—	—	—	—	—	—

=== Select compilation albums ===
List of compilation albums, with selected chart positions
Title	Album details	Peak chart positions	Certifications
Title	Album details	NLD	Certifications
Greatest Hits	Released: December 1979; Label: Phonogram/Philips	21	
Goodbye Luv'	Released: September 1981; Label: CNR/Carrere	—	
Greatest Hits	Released: April 1990; Label: Phonogram/Mercury	—	
Luv' Gold	Released: May 1993; Label: Arcade	9	
25 Jaar Na Waldolala	Released: October 2003; Label: Universal	—	
Completely in Luv'	Released: April 2006; Label: Universal	95	

== Mini-albums ==
- For You (Dureco/High Fashion Records, 1989)
- The Hits EP (Universal Music, 2026)

== Singles ==
List of singles, with selected chart positions
Title	Year	Peak chart positions								Certifications	Album
Title	Year	NLD 100	NLD 40	AUT	BEL Fl	BEL Wa	GER	NZ	SWI	Certifications	Album
"My Man"	1977	11	12	—	11	47	—	—	—		With Luv'
"Dream, Dream"	1977	—	—	—	—	—	—	—	—		With Luv'
"U.O.Me"	1978	3	3	—	3	—	—	—	—		With Luv'
"You're the Greatest Lover"	1978	1	1	2	1	—	1	—	1	NVPI: Gold and Platinum; BVMI: Gold	With Luv'
"Trojan Horse"	1978	1	1	2	1	—	3	6	2	NVPI: Gold and Platinum	With Luv'
"Casanova"	1979	2	6	2	4	—	6	—	4		Lots of Luv'
"Eeny Meeny Miny Moe"	1979	6	11	—	10	—	36	—	—		Lots of Luv'
"Who Do You Wanna Be"	1979	—	—	—	7	—	—	—	—		With Luv'
"Ooh, Yes I Do"	1979	4	5	—	5	—	27	—	—		True Luv'
"Ann-Maria"	1980	4	11	—	14	—	37	—	—		True Luv'
"One More Little Kissie"	1980	4	9	—	23	—	75	—	—		Forever Yours
"My Number One"	1980	4	5	—	7	—	60	—	—		Forever Yours
"Tingalingaling"	1981	15	29	—	—	—	—	—	—		Forever Yours
"Welcome to My Party"	1989	19	22	—	39	—	—	—	—		For You
"4 Gouden Hits"	1989	—	—	—	—	—	—	—	—		
"Luv' Hitpack"	1989	—	—	—	—	—	—	—	—		Greatest Hits (1990)
"I Don't Wanna Be Lonely"	1990	—	—	—	—	—	—	—	—		For You
"Girl Like Me"	1990	—	—	—	—	—	—	—	—		For You
"Hit-Medley"	1990	—	—	—	—	—	—	—	—		For You
"Hasta Mañana"	1990	—	—	—	—	—	—	—	—		Sincerely Yours
"Jungle Jive"	1991	—	—	—	—	—	—	—	—		Sincerely Yours
"The Last Song"	1991		—	—	—	—	—	—	—		Sincerely Yours
"He's My Guy"	1991	75	—	—	—	—	—	—	—		Sincerely Yours
"This Old Heart of Mine"	1992	—	—	—	—	—	—	—	—		
"Megamix '93"	1993	17	23	—	—	—	—	—	—		Luv' Gold
"Luv' Dance-Medley"	1993	—	—	—	—	—	—	—	—		
"With Him Tonight"	2019	—	—	—	—	—	—	—	—		
"Trojan Horse (Kav Verhouzer Remix)"	2022	—	—	—	—	—	—	—	—		
"Luv' Medley (Ladies On Mars Re-Touch Remix)"	2024	—	—	—	—	—	—	—	—		All You Need Is Luv' (Remastered & Expanded Edition)
"Don't Stop Now (Ladies On Mars Remix)"	2024	—	—	—	—	—	—	—	—		All You Need Is Luv' (Remastered & Expanded Edition)
"Don't Stop Now (Ladies On Mars Extended Remix)"	2024	—	—	—	—	—	—	—	—		All You Need Is Luv' (Remastered & Expanded Edition)
"You're The Greatest Lover (Ladies On Mars Re-Construction Mix)"	2025	—	—	—	—	—	—	—	—		All You Need Is Luv' (Remastered & Expanded Edition)
"You're The Greatest Lover (Ladies On Mars Re-Construction Extended Mix)"	2025	—	—	—	—	—	—	—	—		All You Need Is Luv' (Remastered & Expanded Edition)
"Let's Go To The Paradise Of Love (Ladies On Mars Remix)"	2025	—	—	—	—	—	—	—	—		All You Need Is Luv' (Remastered & Expanded Edition)
"Let's Go To The Paradise Of Love (Ladies On Mars Extended Remix)"	2025	—	—	—	—	—	—	—	—		All You Need Is Luv' (Remastered & Expanded Edition)
"Eeny Meeny Miny Moe (Matt Pop Album Remix)"	2025	—	—	—	—	—	—	—	—		Only Luv' – The Matt Pop Remixes
"I.M.U.R (Matt Pop Album Remix)"	2025	—	—	—	—	—	—	—	—		Only Luv' – The Matt Pop Remixes
"Eeny Meeny Miny Moe / I.M.U.R. / Si Que Si – The Matt Pop Remixes EP"	2025	—	—	—	—	—	—	—	—		Only Luv' – The Matt Pop Remixes
"You're The Greatest Lover (Matt Pop Album Remix)"	2025	—	—	—	—	—	—	—	—		Only Luv' – The Matt Pop Remixes
"Don Juanito De Carnaval (Matt Pop Album Remix)"	2025	—	—	—	—	—	—	—	—		Only Luv' – The Matt Pop Remixes
"Trojan Horse (Matt Pop 2025 Extended Remix)"	2025	—	—	—	—	—	—	—	—		Only Luv' – The Matt Pop Remixes
"Life Is On My Side (Matt Pop Remixes)"	2025	—	—	—	—	—	—	—	—		Only Luv' – The Matt Pop Remixes
"You're The Greatest Lover (Otto Wunderbar Remix)"	2026	—	—	—	—	—	—	—	—		

=== Guest appearance ===
Single as featured artist
Title	Single details	Peak chart positions	Certifications
Title	Single details	NLD	Certifications
Starmaker	Charity single by The All Stars (Luv', Justian & Mandy, Desirée, MC Miker G, Marjon, Nando, Oscare and Sisters); Released: December 1989; Label: Dureco	57	

== Videography ==
- Back in Luv' (DVD, Princess Entertainment, 2006)
