= 25 Jaar Na Waldolala =

Greatest hits album by Luv'
- Released: 13 October 2003
- Recorded: 1977–1984
- Genre: Pop, disco
- Label: Universal Music
- Producer: Hans van Hemert, Piet Souer, Pim Koopman, Will Hoebee, Hans Vermeulen, Jacques Zwart
- Compiler: Will Hoebee, René Moonen

Luv' chronology
| All You Need Is Luv' (1994) | 25 Jaar Na Waldolala (2003) | Completely In Luv' (2006) |

25 Jaar Na Waldolala is a compilation album of recordings by Dutch pop group Luv' released by Universal Music in the Netherlands in 2003. It features smash hits (such as "U.O.Me", "You're the Greatest Lover", "Casanova" or "Ooh, Yes I Do"), Spanish versions of four songs, previously unreleased tracks on CD and solo recordings by José Hoebee and Marga Scheide.

== History ==
The two-disc compilation which celebrated the 25th anniversary of the release of breakthrough single "U.O.Me (Theme from Waldolala)" was a co-production between Universal Music Netherlands and the Luv' Fan Club in association with Hans van Hemert productions and CNR label. This anthology was inspired by three Dutch greatest hits albums of other major pop acts from the 1970s: ABBA's 25 Jaar na Waterloo, Pussycat's 25 Jaar na Mississippi and Boney M.'s 25 Jaar Na Daddy Cool.

This double CD contains eleven tracks from the Philips/Phonogram back catalogue (released between 1977 and 1979) as well as twenty songs from the CNR/Carrere catalogue (released between 1979 and 1981). Luv's repertoire, composed by Hans van Hemert and Piet Souer, was a mixture of Pop music, Disco, Latin American music sounds and Schlager.

In addition to digitally remastered songs, the following bonus tracks were added:

- Spanish versions of four hit singles: "Eres mi mejor amante" ("You're the Greatest Lover"), "Casanova", "Si, que si" ("Ooh, Yes I Do") and "Ann-Maria".
- Recordings by José Hoebee: Cover versions of Peggy March's "I Will Follow Him" (a #1 hit on the Dutch Top 40), Doris Day's "Secret Love" and Leonard Cohen's "So Long, Marianne" (in duet with TV host Ron Brandsteder). A previously unissued duet on CD with Hans Vermeulen was also included: "I Love You" (a medley of "Nights in White Satin" and "I (Who Have Nothing)".
- Two songs featuring Marga Scheide: "One, Two, Three... Bananas" performed with the short-lived girl group Marga & Deuce and "Love Symphony" (a medley of The Supremes hits).

Patty Brard was not involved in this album project as she was then in conflict with the producers and the members of Luv'. A DVD was supposed to come out simultaneously with the double CD. However, Brard vetoed this video collection because of her right of publicity. Fans would have to wait April 2006 to get a long-awaited DVD (entitled Back in Luv') released after the reconciliation between the ladies.

25 Jaar Na Waldolala was publicly presented in October 2003 by Hans van Hemert, Will Hoebee and two Luv' girls, José Hoebee and Ria Thielsch.

== Track listing ==
All tracks written by Hans van Hemert and Piet Souer under the pseudonym 'Janschen & Janschens' unless otherwise noted.

=== Disc one ===
1. "My Man (Luv' song)" – 3:05
2. "Dream, Dream" – 3:30
3. "U.O.Me (Theme from Waldolala)" – 2:55
4. "You're the Greatest Lover" – 2:50
5. "Life Is on My Side" – 2:38
6. "Trojan Horse" – 3:24
7. "Shoes Off (Boots On)" – 3:07
8. "Casanova" – 3:48
9. "Marcellino" – 3:14
10. "Eeny Meeny Miny Moe" – 2:46
11. "I Like Sugar Candy Kisses" – 3:34
12. "Ooh, Yes I Do" (Hans van Hemert) – 2:57
13. "Wine, Women and Song" (van Hemert) – 3:45
14. "Getaway" (Piet Souer) – 3:03
15. "Boys Goodnight" (Souer) – 2:40
16. "Ann-Maria" (Souer) – 4:40
17. "Rhythm 'n' Shoes" (van Hemert) – 3:07
18. "Cloud Nr. 9" (van Hemert) – 3:25
19. "Stop Me" (Souer) – 3:09
20. "My Guy" – 3:49
21. "Daddy, What a Life" (Souer) – 3:08

==== Information ====
- Tracks 1 to 6 taken from With Luv' (1978)
- Tracks 7 to 11 taken from Lots of Luv' (1979a)
- Tracks 12 to 21 taken from True Luv' (1979b)

=== Disc two ===
1. "One More Little Kissie" – 3:50
2. "Be My Lover Tonight" – 3:27
3. "Some Call It Happiness" – 3:09
4. "The Show Must Go On" – 3:21
5. "Mother of the Hearts" – 3:04
6. "My Number One" – 3:11
7. "Billy the Kid" – 3:16
8. "Never Wanted to Be..." – 4:34
9. "Song of Love and Understanding" – 3:59
10. "Tingalingaling" – 2:30
11. "Eres Mi Mejor Amante (Spanish version of You're the Greatest Lover)" (Alfred Garrido, Janschen & Janschens) – 2:50
12. "Casanova (Spanish Version)" (Alfred Garrido, Janschen & Janschens) – 3:49
13. "Si, Que Si (Spanish version of "Ooh, Yes I Do)" (Alfred Garrido, van Hemert) – 3:05
14. "Ann-Maria (Spanish version)" (Alfred Garrido, Souer) – 4:04
15. "I Will Follow Him" (Stole, Del Roma, Plante, Gimbel, Altman) performed by José – 2:56
16. "Secret Love" (Fain, Webster) performed by José – 3:04
17. "So Long, Marianne" (Leonard Cohen) performed by José and Ron Brandsteder – 4:18
18. "I Love You" performed by José and Hans Vermeulen – 4:11
  - "Nights in White Satin" (Justin Hayward) / "I (Who Have Nothing)" (Carlo Donida, Mogol, Jerry Leiber and Mike Stoller) performed by José and Hans Vermeulen – 4:11
19. "One, Two, Three... Bananas" (Souer) – 3:39
20. "Love Symphony" (Supremes medley) – 3:35
  - "Love Child" (R. Dean Taylor, Frank Wilson, Pam Sawyer, Deke Richards) / "Interlude" (E.Mergency) / "My World Is Empty Without You" (Holland–Dozier–Holland) / "Interlude" (E.Mergency) / "I Hear a Symphony" (Holland–Dozier–Holland) / "Interlude" (E.Mergency) / "Baby Love" (Holland–Dozier–Holland)

==== Information ====
- Tracks 1 to 10 taken from Forever Yours (1980)
- Track 18 previously unreleased

== Personnel ==
Luv'

- José Hoebee – vocals
- Marga Scheide – vocals
- Patty Brard – vocals
- Ria Thielsch – vocals

Additional personnel

- Ernö Olah & Metropole Orkest – strings

=== Production ===
- Producers:
  - Hans van Hemert (Disc one: tracks 1 to 21 and Disc two: tracks 1 to 14)
  - Pim Koopman (Disc two: tracks 15 and 16)
  - Will Hoebee (Disc two: track 17)
  - Hans Vermeulen and Piet Souer (Disc two: track 18)
  - Piet Souer (Disc two: 19)
  - Jacques Zwart (Disc two: track 20)
- Arrangers:
  - Piet Souer (Disc one: tracks 1 to 21 and Disc two: tracks 1 to 14)
  - Pim Koopman (Disc two: tracks 15 to 16)
  - Harry van Hoof (Disc two: track 17),
  - Harry van Hoof and Hans Vermeulen (Disc two: track 18)
  - Hans Hollestelle (Disc two: track 19)
- Mastering: Pieter Boer
- Compilation assistants: Will Hoebee and René Moonen
