= Luv' Gold =

Greatest hits album by Luv'
- Released: May 1993
- Recorded: 1977–1981, 1993
- Genres: Eurodance; pop; disco
- Length: 75:31
- Label: Arcade
- Producer: Hans van Hemert

Luv' chronology
Sincerely Yours (1991)	Luv' Gold (1993)	All You Need Is Luv' (1994)

Luv' Gold is a 1993 greatest hits album by Dutch girl group Luv' which features hit singles like "You're the Greatest Lover", "Trojan Horse", "Casanova", "Ooh, Yes I Do" and some album tracks from the formation's heyday (1977–1981).

This compilation peaked at #14 in the Netherlands and spent 18 weeks on the album charts. Luv' hadn't scored a hit album for nearly thirteen years.

Luv' Gold includes a bonus track, "Megamix '93", issued as a single, which reached the 23rd position on the Dutch Top 40.

== Background ==
The release of this compilation was the idea of record producer Will Hoebee, José Hoebee's husband, who was inspired by the success of ABBA's and Boney M.'s Gold CDs and the 1970s pop/disco nostalgia. It was also the opportunity for the original Luv' members to reunite.

Patty Brard, José Hoebee and Marga Scheide had tried in early 1989 to record a comeback CD but they didn't succeed at this time. Marga was the only original singer of the group to carry on with other vocalists. She only scored with the renewed version of the trio a moderate hit single, "Welcome to My Party", in Benelux.

The promotion campaign of the Gold CD started in a notorious Amsterdam gay club (De iT) where the singers appeared in concert. The girl trio later performed on TV (including De Staatsloterijshow on RTL 4 and a TV Special aired on Veronica and filmed in the British Virgin Islands). Luv' also toured the club circuit in the Netherlands, Belgium, Germany and Denmark. Less than one year later, the pop act disbanded and reunited again in 2005.

Although Luv's previous album to reach the hit lists, Forever Yours (1980), was released more than twelve years prior, Luv' Gold entered the album charts within eighteen weeks. This album is the first exhaustive singles collection of the trio as it includes hit singles from their entire heyday in the late 1970s and early 1980s. It features songs from their Philips/Phonogram years (1977–1979) and their CNR/Carrere era (1979–1981).

== Track listing ==
All tracks written by Hans van Hemert and Piet Souer under the pseudonym 'Janschen & Janschens'.

1. "You're the Greatest Lover" – 2:51
  - Taken from the album With Luv' (1978)
2. "U.O.me (Waldolala)" – 2:58
  - Taken from the album With Luv' (1978)
3. "Trojan Horse" – 3:25
  - Taken from the album With Luv' (1978)
4. "My Man" – 3:05
  - Taken from the album With Luv' (1978)
5. "Eeny Meeny Miny Moe" – 2:59
  - Taken from the album Lots of Luv' (1979a)
6. "Ooh, Yes I Do" – 2:58
  - Taken from the album True Luv' (1979b)
7. "I Like Sugar Candy Kisses" – 3:36
  - Taken from the album Lots of Luv' (1979a)
8. "Dream, Dream" – 3:30
  - Taken from the album With Luv' (1978)
9. "One More Little Kissie" – 3:46
  - Taken from the album Forever Yours (1980)
10. "Life Is on My Side" – 2:38
  - B-side of "Trojan Horse", taken from the album With Luv' (1978)
11. "Ann-Maria" – 4:41
  - Taken from the album True Luv' (1979b)
12. "Casanova" – 3:51
  - Taken from the album Lots of Luv' (1979a)
13. "I.M.U.R" – 3:36
  - B-side of "Eeny Meeny Miny Moe", taken from the album Lots of Luv' (1979a)
14. "Tingalingaling" – 2:31
  - Taken from the album Forever Yours (1980)
15. "Boys Goodnight" – 2:39
  - Taken from the album True Luv' (1979b)
16. "Getaway" – 3:04
  - Taken from the album True Luv' (1979b)
17. "Shoes off (Boots on)" – 3:07
  - Taken from the album Lots of Luv' (1979a)
18. "My Number One" – 3:11
  - Taken from the album Forever Yours (1980)
19. "Who Do You Wanna Be" – 3:42
  - Taken from the album With Luv' (1978)
20. "Megamix '93" – 2:49
  - Radio version. ("U.O.me (Waldolala)"/"Trojan Horse"/"You're the Greatest Lover"/"Ooh, Yes I Do")

== Personnel ==
- José Hoebee – vocals
- Patty Brard – vocals
- Marga Scheide – vocals
- Ria Thielsch – vocals

Production

- Hans van Hemert – producer, songwriter (tracks 1–19)
- Martin Boer & Dick Liefting for Dancability Productions – track 20

== Single release ==
#	Singles	Date
1.	"Megamix '93"	May 1993

== Charts ==
Country	Peak position
Netherlands (LP Top 50)	14
Netherlands (Mega Album Top 100)	9
