= Goodbye Luv' =

Greatest hits album by Luv'
- Released: 1981
- Recorded: 1979–1980
- Genre: Pop
- Length: 42:38
- Label: CNR/Carrere Records
- Producer: Hans van Hemert

Luv' chronology
Forever Yours (1980)	Goodbye Luv' (1981)	For You (1989)

Goodbye Luv' is a compilation album by Dutch girl group Luv' released by CNR/Carrere Records in 1981 after the formation announced its break-up. It features hit singles taken from the studio albums True Luv' (1979) and Forever Yours (1980) and scored in the charts between 1979 and 1981 (Ooh, Yes I Do, Ann-Maria, One More Little Kissie, My Number One, Tingalingaling).

== Background ==
The fact that Luv' disbanded came as no surprise. The problems started in August 1980 when Patty Brard left the trio. She was replaced by Ria Thielsch who was officially introduced to the public with the release of "My Number One" which was a big selling single in Benelux. Soon after, the tensions within the group, the hectic schedule of the ladies and Marga Scheide's overwork provoked the end of Luv'. In July 1981, the singers made a farewell performance on the Nederland Muziekland show on Veronica by singing "Tingalingaling" (which was released as a single). This final broadcast was filmed in Spakenburg. Luv' also appeared at the Efteling theme park during Hitkrant's Zomerspelen (a summer multi-sport event with Dutch celebrities which was organized by Hitkrant, a teen magazine).

Goodbye Luv' was meant to be Luv's farewell to their fans. Although the female pop act didn't know at this time, they would make several reunions in the future.

== Track listing ==
All tracks written by Hans van Hemert and Piet Souer under the pseudonym 'Janschen & Janschens', except where noted.

=== Side A ===
1. "Ooh, Yes I Do" (Hans van Hemert) – 2:58
  - From True Luv' (1979)
2. "Ann-Maria (Piet Souer) – 4:41
  - From True Luv' (1979)
3. "My Number One" – 3:11
  - From Forever Yours (1980)
4. "Tingalingaling" – 2:31
  - From Forever Yours (1980)
5. "Be My Lover Tonight" – 3:27
  - From Forever Yours (1980)
6. "One More Little Kissie" – 3:46
  - From Forever Yours (1980)

=== Side B ===
1. "Rhythm 'n' Shoes (van Hemert) – 3:07
  - From True Luv' (1979)
2. "Boys Goodnight" (Souer) – 2:40
  - From True Luv' (1979)
3. "Wine, Women and Song" (van Hemert) – 3:45
  - From True Luv' (1979)
4. "My Guy" – 3:49
  - From True Luv' (1979)
5. "The Show Must Go On" – 3:21
  - From Forever Yours (1980)
6. "Billy the Kid" – 3:16
  - From Forever Yours (1980)

== Personnel ==
- José Hoebee – vocals
- Patty Brard – vocals
- Marga Scheide – vocals
- Ria Thielsch – vocals

Production

- Hans van Hemert: producer, songwriter
- Piet Souer: arranger/conductor, songwriter

Design

- Photography: Claude Vanheye & Marja van de Wetering
- Design: Myosotis
