= Back in Luv' =

Back In Luv'

Video by Luv'
- Released: 2006
- Recorded: 1977–2006
- Genre: Pop, disco
- Length: 1:37:18
- Label: Princess Entertainment

Back In Luv' is a DVD compilation by Dutch girl group Luv'. It includes TV performances of the original line-up recorded during their heyday (1977 - 1980). It was released by Princess Entertainment in 2006 when Luv's schedule was hectic again as the pop formation had reunited.

== Background ==
When the double CD compilation 25 Jaar Na Waldolala came out in late 2003, a DVD was supposed to be released simultaneously. However, Luv' singer Patty Brard vetoed this video collection because of her right of publicity and her conflict with another member of the group (José Hoebee). After the reconciliation between Brard and Hoebee which led to Luv's unexpected performance at the 60th birthday of Hans van Hemert (who formed the girl group) in April 2005, a comeback was planned. 2006 saw a profusion of projects around the nostalgia for Luv' in the Netherlands and Belgium: the broadcast of a reality TV documentary about their reunion on RTL 5 and vtm, their participation in three mega concerts of De Toppers at the Amsterdam ArenA, many live shows as well as the release of a compilation "Het Mooiste Van Luv'" and a box set "Completely In Luv'". Furthermore, nothing could stop the distribution of a DVD as Luv' was a visual act. The Dutch subsidiary of Universal Music (which held the rights to the trio's back catalogue) was expected to release this long-awaited DVD, and it was rumoured that BR Music (the leading oldies specialist in the Benelux countries) would distribute it. Instead, the Entertainment division of "Princess Household Appliances" was involved in this video project.

Back In Luv features the girls' performances on Dutch TV in the late 1970s and their appearance on the German TV programme Musikladen where they performed their debut single "My Man" in August 1977. At a time when MTV did not exist, Luv' took advantage of television to become a household name in Benelux, German-speaking countries, and Denmark. In addition to popular shows like AVRO's TopPop, and Showbizzquizz, the main highlights of the DVD are three TV specials :

- All You Need Is Luv, broadcast on TROS in November 1978. The aim of this program was to promote the With Luv' album.
- Lots of LUV, aired on TROS in July 1979 and produced by media tycoon John de Mol. It was named after Luv's second studio LP.
- This Is True LUV, also produced by De Mol as he had an affair with Luv' singer Marga Scheide and broadcast in early 1980 on NCRV to promote the trio's third opus.

== Track listing ==
1. My Man - 3:04
2. Dream, Dream - 3:04
3. U.O.Me - 2:55
4. You're the Greatest Lover - 2:50
5. Trojan Horse - 3:24
6. Special: All You Need Is Luv
  1. You're the Greatest Lover - 2:50
  2. Who Do You Wanna Be - 3:43
  3. Trojan Horse - 3:24
  4. Louis Je T'adore - 3:40
  5. U.O.Me - 2:55
  6. Oh, Get Ready - 3:16
7. Casanova - 3:48
8. Eeny Meeny Miny Moe - 2:50
9. Special: Lots Of Luv
  1. Medley: U.O.Me/Eres Mi Major Amante/Trojan Horse
  2. D.J. - 3:20
  3. Casanova - 3:48
  4. Marcellino - 3:14
  5. Shoes Off (Boots On) - 3:07
  6. Eeny Meeny Miny Moe - 2:46
  7. I.M.U.R. - 2:46
10. Ooh, Yes I Do - 2:58
11. Ann-Maria - 4:38
12. One More Little Kissy - 3:49
13. Special: True Luv
  1. Wine, Women And Song - 3:45
  2. Boys Goodnight - 2:40
  3. Ooh, Yes I Do - 2:58
  4. Rhythm 'n Shoes - 3:07
  5. Ann-Maria - 4:38
  6. My Guy - 3:49
  7. Getaway - 3:03
  8. Let There Be Love - 2:39
