= One More Night (album) =

Studio album by Luv'
- Released: 1995
- Recorded: 1994
- Genre: Pop, dance-pop, Eurodance
- Length: 40:47
- Label: Rondo Music / Pink Records
- Producer: Martin Duiser and Piet Souer

Luv' chronology
All You Need Is Luv' (1994)	One More Night (1995)	You're the Greatest Lover (1998)

One More Night is the re-issue of the 1994 final studio album All You Need Is Luv' by Dutch girl group Luv' released in 1995 by Rondo Music / Pink Records. The pop formation briefly reached fame in the late 1970s and early 1980s in Benelux, German speaking countries, Denmark, South Africa, Mexico and New Zealand.

== Album history ==
In 1993, the original Luv' members reunited. They took advantage of the Disco/pop nostalgia of the 1970s as they were inspired by the success of ABBA and Boney M. compilations. Their 1993 greatest hits album Luv' Gold (which included their greatest hit singles) sold honorably in the Netherlands and Flanders (Belgium). In early 1994, they recorded a dance-pop album All You Need Is Luv' under the guidance of producers Piet Souer and Martin Duiser. This opus had a limited distribution as it was only available in Kruidvat stores in the Netherlands. One year later, it was re-issued by another label (Rondo Music/Pink Records). Soon after, the female pop act disbanded and would reunite later in the mid 2000s.

== Track listing ==
All tracks written by Piet Souer & Martin Duiserunder, except where noted.

1. "All You Need Is Love" (John Lennon & Paul McCartney) – 4:15
2. "Don't Stop Now" – 3:24
3. "Everything's Gonna Be Allright" – 4:00
4. "Shine On" – 3:28
5. "One More Night" (Koen van Baal) – 3:45
6. "I Cried You Outta My Heart" – 6:10
7. "You Love" (Koen van Baal) – 4:23
8. "Let's Go to the Paradise of Love" – 4:00
9. "Bad Reputation" – 3:22
10. "No Johnny, No Can Do" – 3:38
11. "Big Time Spender" – 3:00
12. "Break" – 4:00
13. "Medley" (including "U.O.Me" / "You're the Greatest Lover" / "Casanova" / "My Number One") (Janschen & Janschens) – 4:00

== Personnel ==
Luv'

- José Hoebee – vocals
- Marga Scheide – vocals
- Patty Brard – vocals

Production

- Produced by Piet Souer and Martin Duiser.
- Arranged by Koen van Baal except "Don't Stop Now" and "Big Time Spender" arranged by Piet Souer.
- Recorded at M.D.P and Bolland Studios, Blaricum, Netherlands.
- Mixed by Piet Souer, Martin Duiser and Okkie Huysdens
