= Megamix '93 =

Single by Luv'

from the album Luv' Gold
- Released: 1993
- Recorded: 1992
- Genre: Pop, Dance
- Length: 2:49 (Radio Version) / 4:21 (Long version)
- Label: Arcade
- Songwriter(s): Hans van Hemert and Piet Souer (a.k.a. Janschen & Janschens)
- Producer(s): Dancability

Luv' singles chronology
"This Old Heart of Mine" (1992)	"'Megamix '93'" (1993)	"LUV Dance-Medley" (1993)

"Megamix '93" is the twenty sixth single by Dutch girl group Luv' released in 1993 by Arcade Records. This Megamix (produced by Dancability) is the comeback record of the original group (Patty Brard, José Hoebee and Marga Scheide) since their 1980 single One More Little Kissie. It appears on the compilation Luv' Gold. The long version of this medley is included as a bonus track on the Box set Completely In Luv'.

== Song history ==
Inspired by the success of the ABBA and Boney M Gold compilations, the original Luv' formation reunited in the spring of 1993, after several line-up changes (with (Marga Scheide being the only member to stay constantly in the group). The trio signed a record deal with Arcade Records for the release of a compilation (entitled Luv' Gold). The trio scored a hit single on the Dutch Top 40: a megamix produced by Dancability (a project involving Martin Boer (of the famous Dutch Dance act 2 Brothers on the 4th Floor). This medley is a non-stop dance mix of Luv's greatest chart toppers (U.O.Me (Theme from Waldolala), Trojan Horse, You're the Greatest Lover and Ooh, Yes I Do), whose original versions were smash hits in the late 1970s in a large part of Continental Europe, South Africa and Mexico.

== Chart performance ==
"Megamix '93" was a top 30 hit in the Netherlands and marked Luv's return to the charts since the single "Welcome to My Party" in 1989 (recorded by another line-up).

Chart (1993)	Peak position
Netherlands (Dutch Top 40)	23
Netherlands (Single Top 100)	17

== Track listings and formats ==
- CD Single
1. "Megamix '93" (Radio Version) — 2:49
  U.O.Me (Waldolala)/Trojan Horse/You're The Greatest Lover/Ooh, Yes I Do
2. "You're the Greatest Lover 1993" — 3:18
- Maxi CD Single
1. "Megamix" (Radio Version) — 2:49
  U.O.Me (Waldolala)/Trojan Horse/You're The Greatest Lover/Ooh, Yes I Do
2. "You're the Greatest Lover 1993" — 3:18
3. "Megamix"
  You're The Greatest Lover/Casanova/Ooh, Yes I Do/Trojan Horse/U.O.Me (Waldolala)
4. "Megamix '93" (Long Version) — 4:21
  U.O.Me (Waldolala)/Trojan Horse/You're The Greatest Lover/Ooh, Yes I Do/Casanova
