= Ria Thielsch =

- Born: 25 August 1951 (age 74); Manokwari, Dutch New Guinea (present-day West Papua, Indonesia)
- Origin: Netherlands
- Genres: Pop
- Occupations: Singer; model; dancer
- Years active: 1960s–present
- Label: Carrere

Ria Thielsch (born 25 August 1951) is a Dutch singer and former model, most notable for being a member of the girl group Luv' after replacing Patty Brard in 1980. She officially joined the group with the release of the album Forever Yours and the single My Number One (a Top 5 hit in Benelux). March 1981 saw Luv's first break-up. The trio went through lineup changes and made several comebacks. Between March 2016 and December 2018, Ria was active as a Luv' singer again. She is of Indo (Dutch-Indonesian) descent.

== Early years ==
Ria Thielsch started her career as a model in the late 1960s. In 1978, she was a limbo dancer and singer in the Ricardo & The Flames disco group which recorded a single, "Trinidad", that was produced by Roy Beltman (who collaborated with the band BZN). However, the single failed to chart.

== Luv' ==
In August 1980, after a couple of years of mainstream success, Luv' experienced trouble as Patty Brard suddenly left the formation. Hans van Hemert and Piet Souer, the group's producers, had already written new material for a next album and the girls had contract obligations. Brard's departure caused InterLUV' (Luv's limited company) to lose an estimated $75,000 as many performances were cancelled. Patty was replaced by Ria Thielsch who like her had Indo and West Papuan origins. Ria knew Marga Scheide from their modelling years. She was selected from 200 applicants. Though she made some appearances by performing One More Little Kissie on stage and on TV, she was presented to the public when the album Forever Yours and the single My Number One came out. These records were smash hits in Benelux. Then, Luv' was supposed to take part in the Yamaha Music Festival (officially known as the 'World Popular Song Festival') in November 1980 with the song "Be My Lover Tonight". Instead of it, Luv' cancelled their participation to this competition and performed in the Musikladen TV show in Germany.

Soon after, Marga Scheide became overworked which brought Luv' to a standstill. In March 1981, a statement announced Luv's break-up. The group made a farewell performance later, on 22 July 1981, on the Nederland Muziekland show on Veronica (TV channel) to promote the single "Tingalingaling". Later in 1981, CNR/Carrere Records released the compilation Goodbye Luv'.

After Luv', Ria continued her modelling career until the early 1990s. She was in charge of Luv's styling in 1990 and 1991 when the group's lineup consisted of Marga Scheide, Diana van Berlo and Carina Lemoine.

In April 2003, she took part with José Hoebee in a Luv' fan club day. Six months later, she attended with José and Hans van Hemert the release party of the compilation 25 Jaar Na Waldolala. In 2013, she was present at a meet'n greet party in Eindhoven and at the release party of Luv's photo book in 2015.

In late October 2015, the media speculated about a comeback of Luv'. A German talent agency announced on its website that Marga and José could be booked as Luv' for live shows. In interviews, the ladies remained vague about plans to reactivate the group. Finally, on 16 March 2016, Marga, José and Ria announced officially their comeback in De Telegraaf, and its sister magazine Privé. Patty Brard was not involved in this reunion. Ria and Luv' toured the nostalgia circuit in the Netherlands and Belgium until 2018. On 4 January 2019, the group announced an unexpected line-up change in the Dutch media: TV personality Chimène van Oosterhout replaced Ria

== Discography ==
Single with Ricardo & The Flames

- "Trinidad" (1979)

Singles with Luv'

- "My Number One" (CNR/Carrere Records, 1980)
- "Tingalingaling (CNR/Carrere Records, 1981)"

Album with Luv'

- Forever Yours (CNR/Carrere Records, 1980)

Compilations with Luv'

- Goodbye Luv' (CNR/Carrere Records, 1981)
- Luv' Gold (Arcade Records, 1993)
- You're the Greatest LUVer (Mercury/PolyGram Germany, 1993)
- Hollands Glorie: LUV (CNR, 2002)
- 25 Jaar Na Waldolala (Universal Music, 2003)
- Completely In Luv' (Universal Music, 2006)
