= Forever Yours (Luv' album) =

Studio album by Luv'
- Released: 1980; 2006 (Remastered, as part of the Completely in Luv' box set)
- Recorded: 1979
- Genre: Pop
- Length: 40:47
- Labels: CNR/Carrere Records (original release); Universal Music Netherlands (2006 re-issue)
- Producer: Hans van Hemert

Luv' chronology
Greatest Hits (1979)	Forever Yours (1980)	Goodbye Luv' (1981)

Forever Yours is the fourth album by Dutch girl group Luv', released in November 1980 by the labels CNR/Carrere Records. It includes the hit singles "One More Little Kissie", "My Number One" and "Tingalingaling". This opus features a new group's member Ria Thielsch who replaced Patty Brard. It was Luv''s last record to benefit from a real international release in more than thirty countries. In 2006, this LP has been reissued in digitally remastered form by Universal Music Netherlands as part of the Completely in Luv' box set.

== Background ==
In the summer of 1980, Patty Brard suddenly left Luv' as the trio was promoting the One More Little Kissie single. This defection had bad consequences as new material had already been written for a next album. A new member was quickly found: Ria Thielsch, a former model who already knew Marga Scheide from modeling agencies and a singer/limbo dancer from the 'Ricardo & The Flames' group. Ria was officially introduced with the release of the Forever Yours album and the "My Number One" single. These records were big-selling discs in Benelux. However, in the neighbouring European countries, they did not achieve the good sales of the records featuring Patty.

Forever Yours is an eclectic combination of Pop, Latin American music, Schlager and Exotica sounds. Its production was supervised by Hans van Hemert and Piet Souer, who had already been responsible for the trio's recordings since 1977. The songs "One More Little Kissie" and "I Win It" were already on the track listing of the 1980 version of the previous album True Luv'.

The lyrics of the song "The Show Must Go On" deals with Luv's problems due to Patty's departure. Moreover, the female formation intended to represent the Netherlands at the Yamaha Music Festival with the track "Be My Lover Tonight" in November 1980. However, Luv' cancelled their participation to this competition.

== Track listing ==
All songs written by Hans van Hemert and Piet Souer under the pseudonym 'Janschen & Janschens' unless otherwise noted.

Side A

1. "My Number One" – 3:11
2. "Billy the Kid" – 3:16
3. "Never Wanted to Be..." – 4:34
4. "Mother of the Hearts" – 3:04
5. "Tingalingaling" – 2:30
6. "The Show Must Go On" – 3:21

Side B

1. "Ooh, I Like It Too" – 3:06
2. "I Win It" – 3:05
3. "Song of Love and Understanding" – 3:59
4. "Some Call It Happiness" – 3:58
5. "Be My Lover Tonight" – 3:27
6. "One More Little Kissie" – 3:50

== 2006 bonus tracks ==
Forever Yours was remastered and reissued in 2006 as part of the Completely in Luv' box set with the same track listing and four bonus tracks:

- "You're the Greatest Lover '93" (Janschen & Janschens) – 3:18
- "Megamix '93 (Long Version)" (Janschen & Janschens) – 4:04
- Medley of U.O.Me (Waldolala)/Trojan Horse/You're The Greatest Lover/Ooh, Yes I Do/Casanova
- "Trojan Horse (2006 remix)" (Janschen & Janschens) – 3:05
- "All You Need Is Luv' Jingle" (Janschen & Janschens) – 0:12

== Singles ==
#	Singles	Date
1.	"One More Little Kissie"	May 1980
2.	"My Number One"	October 1980
3.	"Tingalingaling"	August 1981

== Charts ==
Luv' had better chart performances on the singles hit lists than on the album charts. The pop formation was at this time popular among teenagers who were 45 PM singles buyers. The 45 PM records were a significant format for the music industry in the late 1970s and early 1980s.

Country	Album charts	Peak position
Netherlands	LP Top 50	13
Netherlands	Nationale Hitparade LP Top 50	5

== Personnel ==
Luv'

- José Hoebee – vocals
- Marga Scheide – vocals
- Ria Thielsch – vocals
- Patty Brard – vocals

Additional personnel

- Ernö Olah – strings
- Metropole Orkest – strings

Production

- Hans van Hemert – producer
- Piet Souer – arranger, conductor
- www.pat-sound.nl – mastering
- Danceability – remixing (tracks: 13, 14)
- J.R Beltman – remixing (track 15)
- F.M Endenburg – remixing (track 15)

Design

- Claude Vanheye – photography
- Myosotis – design
- Clouds Studio – art direction
