= One More Night =

One More Night may refer to:

== Music ==
=== Albums ===
- One More Night (album), a reissued 1995 album by Luv'

=== Songs ===
- "One More Night" (Cascada song), 2004
- "One More Night" (Dinah Nah song), 2017
- "One More Night" (Esther Hart song), 2003
- "One More Night" (Maroon 5 song), 2012
- "One More Night" (Phil Collins song), 1984
- "One More Night" (Sandie Shaw song), 1977
- "One More Night" (Sandra song), 1990
- "One More Night", by Amber from This Is Your Night
- "One More Night", by Bella Thorne from Jersey
- "One More Night", by Bob Dylan from Nashville Skyline
- "One More Night", by Can from Ege Bamyasi
- "One More Night", by Fleetwood Mac from Live
- "One More Night", by Helen Reddy from Ear Candy
- "One More Night", by Jordan Knight from Unfinished
- "One More Night", by Michael Kiwanuka from Love & Hate
- "One More Night", by New Kids on the Block from Thankful
- "One More Night", by Takako Mamiya from Love Trip
