= All You Need Is Luv' =

Studio album by Luv'
- Released: February 1994
- Recorded: 1993
- Genres: Pop, dance-pop, Eurodance
- Length: 40:47
- Label: Roman Disc
- Producers: Martin Duiser and Piet Souer

Luv' chronology
Luv' Gold (1993)	All You Need Is Luv' (1994)	25 Jaar Na Waldolala (2003)

Alternative cover
- 2021 and 2025 reissues of All You Need Is Luv' by Hit It! Music

All You Need Is Luv' is the final studio album by Dutch girl group Luv' released in 1994 by Roman Disc and only available in Kruidvat stores in the Netherlands. It was reissued in 1995, 2021 and 2025.

== History ==
In 1993, the original Luv' trio (José Hoebee, Patty Brard and Marga Scheide) made a comeback. Their Luv' Gold (1993) compilation sold 40.000 copies in the Netherlands and Belgium. They went on a promo tour through Benelux, Germany, Switzerland and Denmark. In late 1993, Luv' decided to record new material. Piet Souer and Martin Duiser assisted by Koen van Baal supervised the recording sessions. Souer is familiar to the group's public as Hans van Hemert and he wrote the whole Luv' repertoire in their heyday. Duiser was an acclaimed artist as he was involved in the world-famous Stars on 45 productions. Souer and Duiser had already teamed up in the 1980s to produce popular Dutch artists (including Anita Meyer). Keyboard player Koen van Baal had a career as an arranger and a session musician (for successful acts like German band Scorpions and Marco Borsato).

All You Need Is Luv' consists of thirteen tracks recorded in the Bolland studios (owned by the duo Bolland & Bolland) in Blaricum. The aim of this album was to conform to the popular music genres of the mid 1990s. Souer and Duiser wrote nine original tracks, and Van Baal two songs. Luv' rendered "All You Need Is Love" (originally performed by The Beatles) in a reggae oriented tempo. Some songs were performed in a Eurodance style: "Don't Stop Now", "One More Night", "I Cried You Outta My Heart", and "Let's Go to the Paradise of Love". Another composition, "Your Love", had a Contemporary R&B influence. Other songs, including "Bad Reputation" and "Big Time Spender", had Pop rock elements. "No Johnny No Can Do" was a tribute to Luv's camp and Latino style of their debut. The final track was a Dance medley of their re-recorded greatest hits "U.O.Me", "You're the Greatest Lover", "Casanova" and "My Number One".

The album was released by Roman Disc and was only available in Kruidvat shops (a Dutch chain of drugstores). Because of this limited distribution, it did not enter the album charts. One year later, it was reissued by Rondo Music/Pink Records with a new title: One More Night.

On April 2, 2021, Dutch independent label Hit It! Music reissued the album on digital platforms (Apple Music, YouTube, Amazon Music, Deezer and Spotify).

All You Need Is Luv' was reissued on a double CD and streaming platforms by Hit It Music! on March 14, 2025, in a Remastered & Expanded Edition. This re-release featured the original track listing on CD 1 and the Ladies on Mars remixes on CD 2. In anticipation of this reissue, seven Ladies On Mars remixes were released as digital singles between October 2024 and March 2025: Luv' Medley (Ladies On Mars Re-Touch Remix), "Don't Stop Now (Ladies On Mars Remix)", "Don't Stop Now (Ladies On Mars Extended Remix)", "You're The Greatest Lover (Ladies On Mars Re-Construction Mix)", "You're The Greatest Lover (Ladies On Mars Re-Construction Extended Mix)", "Let's Go To The Paradise Of Love (Ladies On Mars Remix)", "Let's Go To The Paradise Of Love (Ladies On Mars Extended Remix)". Moreover, All You Need Is Luv' (Remastered & Expanded Edition) was also re-released exclusively for Record Store Day 2025 on April 12, 2025, as a limited edition release on pink and blue vinyl.

== Track listing ==
Standard CD edition in 1994, CD reissue in 1995 and digital reissue in 2021

All tracks written by Piet Souer & Martin Duiser, except where noted.

1. "All You Need Is Love" (John Lennon & Paul McCartney) – 4:15
2. "Don't Stop Now" – 3:24
3. "Everything's Gonna Be Allright" – 4:00
4. "Shine On" – 3:28
5. "One More Night" (Koen van Baal) – 3:45
6. "I Cried You Outta My Heart" – 6:10
7. "You Love" (Koen van Baal) – 4:23
8. "Let's Go to the Paradise of Love" – 4:00
9. "Bad Reputation" – 3:22
10. "No Johnny, No Can Do" – 3:38
11. "Big Time Spender" – 3:00
12. "Break" – 4:00
13. "Medley" (including "U.O.Me" / "You're the Greatest Lover" / "Casanova" / "My Number One") (Janschen & Janschens) – 4:00

Remastered & Expanded Edition (CD reissue in 2025)

All tracks written by Piet Souer & Martin Duiser, except where noted.

CD 1:

1. "All You Need Is Love" (John Lennon & Paul McCartney) – 4:15
2. "Don't Stop Now" – 3:24
3. "Everything's Gonna Be Allright" – 4:00
4. "Shine On" – 3:28
5. "One More Night" (Koen van Baal) – 3:45
6. "I Cried You Outta My Heart" – 6:10
7. "You Love" (Koen van Baal) – 4:23
8. "Let's Go to the Paradise of Love" – 4:00
9. "Bad Reputation" – 3:22
10. "No Johnny, No Can Do" – 3:38
11. "Big Time Spender" – 3:00
12. "Break" – 4:00
13. "Medley" (including "U.O.Me" / "You're the Greatest Lover" / "Casanova" / "My Number One") (Janschen & Janschens) – 4:00

CD 2:

1. "You're the Greatest Lover (Ladies On Mars Re-Construction Mix)" – 3:04
2. "Don't Stop Now (Ladies On Mars Remix)" – 3:58
3. "Let's Go To The Paradise Of Love (Ladies On Mars Remix)" – 3:03
4. "Luv' Medley (Ladies On Mars Re-Touch Remix)" – 3:12
5. "You're the Greatest Lover (Ladies On Mars Re-Construction Extended Mix)"– 5:15
6. "Don't Stop Now (Ladies On Mars Extended Remix)" – 5:17
7. "Let's Go To The Paradise Of Love (Ladies On Mars Extended Remix)"– 5:47

Remastered & Expanded Edition (double vinyl reissue in limited edition - 2025)

All tracks written by Piet Souer & Martin Duiser, except where noted.

Pink vinyl (original track listing):

Side 1:

1. "All You Need Is Love" (John Lennon & Paul McCartney) – 4:15
2. "Don't Stop Now" – 3:24
3. "Everything's Gonna Be Allright" – 4:00
4. "Shine On" – 3:28
5. "One More Night" (Koen van Baal) – 3:45
6. "I Cried You Outta My Heart" – 6:10

Side 2:

1. "You Love" (Koen van Baal) – 4:23
2. "Let's Go to the Paradise of Love" – 4:00
3. "Bad Reputation" – 3:22
4. "No Johnny, No Can Do" – 3:38
5. "Big Time Spender" – 3:00
6. "Break" – 4:00
7. "Medley" (including "U.O.Me" / "You're the Greatest Lover" / "Casanova" / "My Number One") (Janschen & Janschens) – 4:00

Blue vinyl (Ladies on Mars remixes):

Side 3:

1. "You're the Greatest Lover (Ladies On Mars Re-Construction Mix)" – 3:04
2. "Don't Stop Now (Ladies On Mars Remix)" – 3:58
3. "Let's Go To The Paradise Of Love (Ladies On Mars Remix)" – 3:03
4. "Luv' Medley (Ladies On Mars Re-Touch Remix)" – 3:12

Side 4:

1. "You're the Greatest Lover (Ladies On Mars Re-Construction Extended Mix)"– 5:15
2. "Don't Stop Now (Ladies On Mars Extended Remix)" – 5:17
3. "Let's Go To The Paradise Of Love (Ladies On Mars Extended Remix)"– 5:47

== Personnel ==
Luv'

- José Hoebee – vocals
- Marga Scheide – vocals
- Patty Brard – vocals

Production (original credits)

- Produced by Piet Souer and Martin Duiser.
- Arranged by Koen van Baal except "Don't Stop Now" and "Big Time Spender" arranged by Piet Souer.
- Recorded at M.D.P and Bolland Studios, Blaricum, Netherlands.
- Mixed by Piet Souer, Martin Duiser and Okkie Huysdens

Design (first edition in 1994)

- Cover Design: Henk-Jan Voordes

Remastered & Expanded Edition (additional credits for the 2025 reissue on CD and double vinyl)

- Remixed, arranged & additional production by: Ladies On Mars (Jonathan Douglas Braverman) at Mars Estudio, Buenos Aires, Argentina
- A&R, remix production & project coordination: Casper Janssen for Hit It! Music
- Mastered by: Matias Parisi
