= Tingalingaling =

Single by Luv'

from the album Forever Yours
- B-side: "Billy The Kid"
- Released: July 1981
- Recorded: 1980
- Genre: Pop
- Length: 3:14
- Label: CNR/Carrere Records
- Songwriter(s): Hans van Hemert and Piet Souer (a.k.a. Janschen & Janschens)
- Producer(s): Hans van Hemert

Luv' singles chronology
"My Number One" (1980)	"Tingalingaling" (1981)	"Welcome to My Party" (1989)

"Tingalingaling" (also credited as Tingeling) is the thirteenth single by the Dutch girl group Luv', released in the summer of 1981 by CNR/Carrere Records. The song appears on the Forever Yours album and the Goodbye Luv' compilation. The group initially intended the song to be its final single, but would continue to be active until 2020.

== Background ==
My Number One was a smash hit in Benelux, proving that Luv's new member Ria Thielsch (who replaced Patty Brard) was accepted by the public. However, just before Christmas 1980, Marga Scheide became overworked and had to be on sick leave until February 1981. The group had to stop all its activities. In early March 1981, Luv's break-up was announced in the media. A Dutch radio DJ, Hugo van Gelderen, often played "Tingalingaling" (an uptempo post-disco and synth-pop track taken from the Forever Yours album) on TROS station. The song was so popular among the TROS listeners and Luv's fans that Carrere Records decided to release it as a single. The group made a farewell performance on July 22, 1981, on the "Nederland Muziekland" show on Veronica (TV channel) in Spakenburg to promote what was supposed to be their final single. However, the group would continue to perform from 1988 - 1996, 2005 - 2012, and 2015 - 2020.

== Commercial performance ==
Due to a limited promotion by the Luv' singers, "Tingalingaling" only charted in the Netherlands and was a moderate hit in comparison with the million-sellers You're the Greatest Lover and Trojan Horse.

== Charts ==
=== Weekly charts ===
Chart (1980)	Peak position
Netherlands (Dutch Top 40)	29
Netherlands (currently Single Top 100)	15

=== Year-end charts ===
Chart (1981)	Position
Netherlands (Dutch Top 40) 1981	256
