= Welcome to My Party (song) =

Single by Luv'

from the album For You
- B-side: "No Cure No Pay"
- Released: October 1989
- Recorded: 1989
- Genre: Dance-pop
- Length: 3:00 (single version); 6:21 (12-inch version)
- Label: Dureco/High Fashion
- Songwriter(s): Ronald Sommer; Marcel Schimscheimer; John van Katwijk
- Producer(s): Nigel Wright

Luv' singles chronology
"Tingalingaling" (1981)	"Welcome to My Party" (1989)	"4 Gouden Hits" (1989)

"Welcome to My Party" is the fourteenth single by the Dutch girl group Luv', released in the autumn of 1989 by Dureco/High Fashion. This song appears on the 1989 EP For You and is the group's comeback record since their 1981 single Tingalingaling. It was recorded by a line-up consisting of Marga Scheide (the only original Luv' singer) and two new members, Michelle Gold and Diana van Berlo.

== Background ==
In late October 1988, the original Luv' members (Marga Scheide, José Hoebee and Patty Brard) reunited for the Dutch TV charity show "Samen" (hosted by Mies Bouwman) to perform their signature song "You're the Greatest Lover". This reunion was unexpected and provoked an enthusiastic reaction among the trio's fans. Luv' planned to record new material. The famous British "hit machine" Stock Aitken Waterman were announced to produce it. However, this project never materialized. In April 1989, José Hoebee refused to be involved in a comeback due to family reasons. She was replaced by the 23-year-old Diana van Berlo. In early August 1989, Brard suddenly left Luv' as she signed a contract with the newly created RTL Véronique TV channel. A replacement had to be found. Scheide recruited 29-year-old English vocalist Michelle Gold. The 1989 Luv' trio had a record deal with Dureco/High Fashion Music.

Hans van Hemert and Piet Souer, who originally conceived the Luv' concept, did not collaborate with the renewed line-up of the female formation. With the help of Marga's partner, Jacques Zwart (aka E. Mergency), a new musical direction was chosen and the British producer Nigel Wright was hired to supervise new recordings. Wright was a veteran of the English dance scene thanks to the hits he produced for Shakatak, Imagination, Mirage and other bands. Luv' recorded the six-track mini-album For You. Most of the work was done at Wright's Skratch Studios in London while the vocals were recorded at Dureco studio in Weesp, the Netherlands. The girl group was inspired by the PWL sound that dominated European music production in the late 1980s.

In early October 1989, Dureco/High Fashion Music decided to release the Dance-pop single "Welcome to My Party" as a foretaste of For You. This track was written by John van Katwijk (who worked previously with Patricia Paay), Marcel Schimscheimer (who collaborated with René Froger) and Ronald Sommer. On September 29, 1989, "Welcome to My Party" premiered on the TROS TV program "Grote Club Show". The release of the single was announced in the November 11, 1989 issue of the pan-European trade magazine Music & Media.

On November 27, 1989, Marga Scheide trademarked the name Luv'. This ruling is valid in Benelux until November 2029. What motivated Marga to take this decision was to prevent misuse of the name of the group. An example of what could have happened to Luv' is Boney M. A court verdict stated that Liz Mitchell, Bobby Farrell, Marcia Barrett and Maizie Williams were entitled to perform their own Boney M. shows separately with a line-up of their choice.

== Commercial performance ==
The newly reformed Luv' trio was aiming to match its big Continental European success in the late 1970s when the group had a string of international hit singles (including "You're the Greatest Lover", "Trojan Horse", "Casanova" and "Ooh, Yes I Do").

"Welcome to My Party" reached the top 30 in the Netherlands and in Flanders (Belgium).

In 1990, Irish pop group Luv Bug released a cover version of the song.

== Track listing ==
"Welcome to My Party" came out in four formats.

- 7" vinyl single (version 1)
1. "Welcome to My Party" (single version) – 3:00
2. "No Cure No Pay" – 3:39
- 7" vinyl single (Version 2)
1. "Welcome to My Party" (single version) – 3:00
2. "Medley" – 5:16
- Maxi CD single
1. "Welcome to My Party" (single version) – 3:00
2. "Welcome to My Party" (12-inch version) – 6:21
3. "No Cure No Pay" – 3:39
- 12-inch vinyl
1. "Welcome to My Party" (Party House mix) – 6:01 / "Welcome to My Party" (acapella) – 1:32
2. "The Original Luv' Medley" (12-inch version) – 7:14

== Charts ==
=== Weekly charts ===
Chart (1989)	Peak position
Belgium (BRT Top 30 Flanders)	28
Belgium (Ultratop 50 Flanders)	39
Netherlands (Dutch Top 40)	22
Netherlands (Single Top 100)	19

=== Year-end charts ===
Chart (1989)	Position
Netherlands (Dutch Top 40)	200
