= Ome Henk =

Dutch fictional character

- First appearance: 1990
- Created by: Frank van der Plas
- Adapted by: Eric Schreurs (cartoon)
- Portrayed by: Frank van der Plas
- English name: Uncle Henk
- Style: Parody
- Type: TV role; comic; cartoon
- Website: omehenk.nl

In-universe information
- Full name: Henk Stubbe
- Occupation: Irritable, unemployed old man
- Home: Biggeveen
- Nationality: Dutch

Ome Henk ("Uncle Henk") is the main character of a Dutch CD, DVD and comic series of the same name. The Ome Henk CDs consist of stories which depend on dialogue and sound effects, and songs, some of which are parodies.

Ome Henk is a character created and performed by actor Frank van der Plas (born 20 May 1960, Amsterdam). He is portrayed as a cranky, unemployed, and often aggressive old man living in the fictitious town of Biggeveen, which is full of other obnoxious, feeble-minded and otherwise extraordinary characters. The stories on the Ome Henk CDs highlight these various personalities and build up to many painful and embarrassing situations. The sketches have an absurd, caricatural character, and traditionally end with an explosion. Ome Henk's songs are about daily nuisances and other topics of interest to a grouchy old man. They're built upon (sometimes rapped) couplets and refrains and often feature a lively crowd, cheering and singing along. This makes the songs very suitable for après-ski and carnival parties. While his music and sketches form the most important part of his body of work, Ome Henk and his neighbors also appear in cartoons drawn by cartoonist Eric Schreurs and in live comedic sketches.

His most well-known song internationally might be "Opblaaskrokodil" (Inflatable crocodile), because of its use in the animutation French Erotic Film. In the Netherlands, five of his singles reached the Dutch Top 40, including: "Op de camping" (a parody of "In the Navy" by the Village People), and "Mambo nr 6" (a parody of "Mambo No. 5" by Lou Bega).

== Regular characters ==
- Henk Stubbe (Ome Henk)
- Jantje (neighbouring boy and 'friend' of Ome Henk)
- Pietje (friend of Jantje)
- Ed van Hooydonck
- Tet Tetterdetet (resident who tends to make "tetetetet" sounds as a linguistic filler)
- Koos Korswagen (the manager)
- Floris-Jan van Fleppensteyn (elitist neighbour)
- Harry Witkamp (antisocial assistant of Sinterklaas)
- Arie de Beuker (aggressive and obnoxious resident)
- Tjabbe Tjibsma (shy computer specialist)

== Discography ==
=== Albums ===
- 1991: De spannende verhalen van Ome Henk (The Exciting Tales of Uncle Henk)
- 1992: De nieuwe avonturen van Ome Henk (The New Adventures of Uncle Henk)
- 1993: Ome Henk is weer bezig! (Uncle Henk Is at It Again!)
- 1994: Ome Henk slaat wild om zich heen (Uncle Henk Lashes Out at All Around)
- 1995: Ome Henk is niet meer te houwe! (Uncle Henk is Iut of Control!)
- 1995: Ome Henk, Gouwe Suuksesse! (Uncle Henk, Golden Successes)
- 1996: Ome Henk rost er op los! (Uncle Henk Punches Away!)
- 1997: Ome Henk laat zich niet kisten! (Uncle Henk Won't Be Boxed In!)
- 1997: Ome Henk en de tovenaar van Salsa Borenco (Uncle Henk and the Wizard of Salsa Borenco)
- 1998: Ome Henk gooit de beuk erin! (Uncle Henk Starts the Brawl!)
- 1999: Ome Henk staat op springen! (Uncle Henk is About to Explode!)
- 2000: Ome Henk maakt er een eind aan! (Uncle Henk Outs an End to It!)
- 2001: Ome Henk gaat door het lint (Uncle Henk Goes Postal)
- 2003: Kerstfeest met Ome Henk (Christmas with Uncle Henk)
- 2004: Op Zomervakantie Met Ome Henk (Summer Holidays with Uncle Henk)
- 2004: Ome Henk gaat nooit verloren! (Uncle Henk Will Never Be Lost!)
- 2006: Het Grote Duettenalbum (The Big Album of Duets)

=== Singles ===
- 1990: "Snip – Ik ben verkouden" ("I Got the Power")
- 1991: "Olee olee, Sinterklaas is Here to Stay"
- 1992: "Sneeuwwitje waar zit je?"
- 1992: "Holadiejee! Holadiejoo!"
- 1992: "Oranje!!" (We worden kampioen!")
- 1993: "Stelletje halleve zole!"
- 1993: "Ome Henk viert feest"
- 1994: "Moeve"
- 1995: "Op de camping" ("In the Navy")
- 1995: "Heftig!"
- 1996: "Dombo TV"
- 1996: "Ja dat is a-sociaal"
- 1996: "Olleke Bolleke"
- 1996: "Die is dom ja!"
- 1997: "Neem een ander in de maling" ("Barbie Girl")
- 1997: "Ik zing dit lied voor Ome Henk" ("Ik zing dit lied voor jou alleen")
- 1997: "Carnaval is niks voor mij"
- 1998: "Samba la Bamba"
- 1999: "Ploem ploem jenka"
- 1999: "Mambo nr. 6" ("Mambo No. 5")
- 2000: "Aaai oehoe aai"
- 2001: "Opblaaskrokodil"
- 2001: "Sieb van der Kast – 't Leven gaat niet over rozen!"
- 2002: "Opblaaskrokodil" "(Heppie Summer Miks Live versie")
- 2004: "Lekker, Lekker" ("Dragostea din tei")
- 2006: "Ik Wil Knallen" – with Patty Brard
- 2007: "M'n Tiete zijn Okee" ("My Boobs Are OK")
