= Will Hoebee =

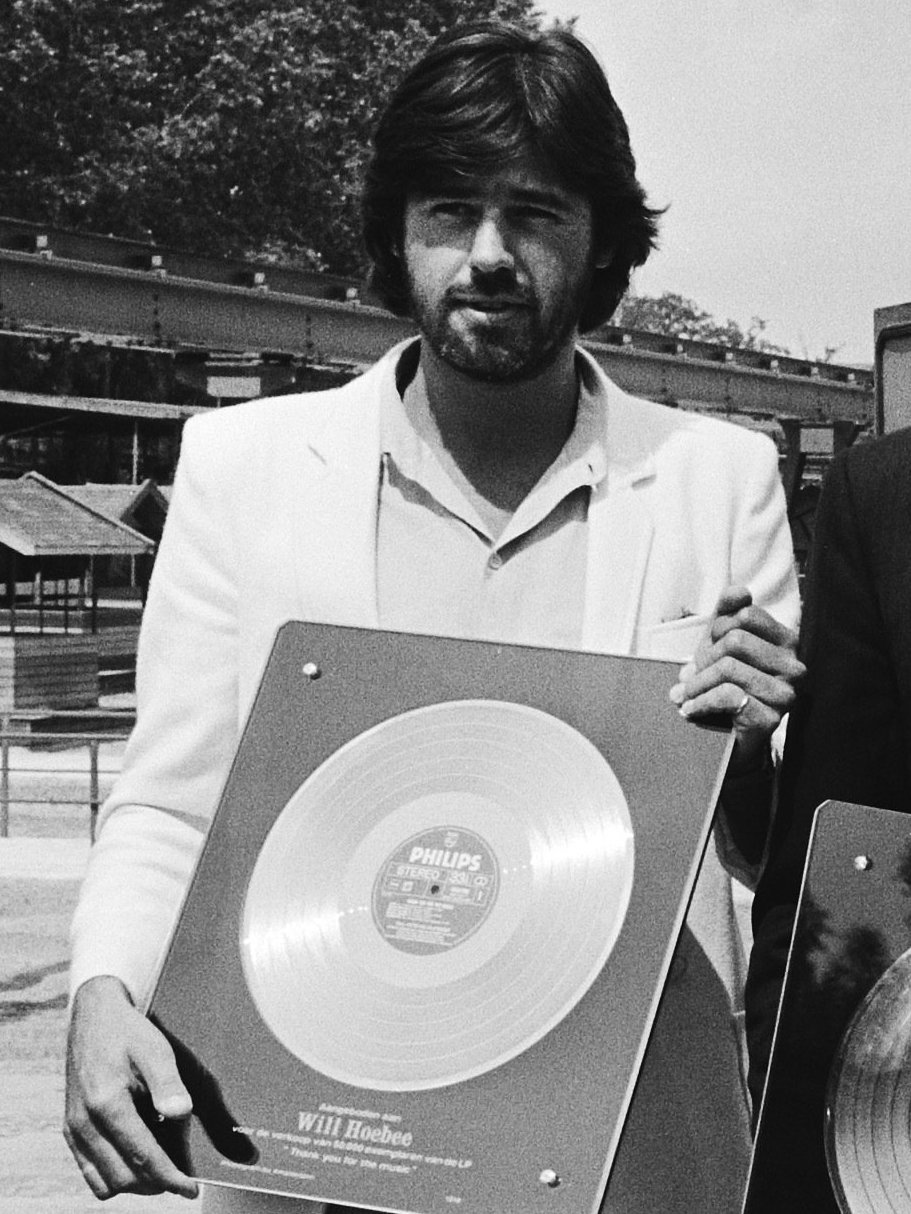
- Hoebee in 1979

Background information
- Born: 29 June 1947; Hilversum, Netherlands
- Origin: Netherlands
- Died: 10 June 2012 (aged 64) Hasselt, Belgium
- Genres: Pop
- Occupations: songwriter, producer, arranger.
- Years active: 1970-2012
- Formerly of: José Hoebee, Peter Koelewijn, Benny Neyman, Saskia & Serge, Gheorghe Zamfir, David Soul, Nana Mouskouri

Will Hoebee (29 June 1947 – 10 June 2012) was a Dutch record producer and songwriter. In late 1981, he married José Hoebee (singer of the girl group Luv'). Benny Neyman, Saskia & Serge, Gheorghe Zamfir, David Soul and Nana Mouskouri were among the acts he produced.

== Debut ==
Hoebee was born in Hilversum, Netherlands. After graduating from high school, he found a job at the mailing service of the AVRO (a Dutch public broadcasting organisation) where he met many celebrities. He later worked at NRU (now: NOS) record library. At this time, he was approached by Herman Stok and Hans Kemna to produce various radio shows for public broadcaster NOS. In 1970, he entered the radio promotion division of Ariola Records. Two years later, he was hired by Phonogram Records where he stayed until the early 1980s.

== A successful record producer ==
In the mid 1970s, Hoebee started his collaboration with producer/songwriter Peter Koelewijn. They co-wrote the Dutch Top 5 hit single "Patrick Mon Chéri" performed by Kiki & Pearly in 1975. French pop singer Sheila covered that year this song that went gold in France and sold 800.000 copies. Soon after, Hoebee produced the Dutch version of Austin Roberts signature song "Rocky" that hit the number one spot in the Netherlands and was performed by Don Mercedes. In 1977, he founded with Koelewijn the "Born Free" label (a Phonogram subsidiary). Saskia & Serge and Rob de Nijs were part of the roster of this short-lived record company.

In 1979, Will met Luv' singer José Andreoli. They got married in late 1981 and celebrated their wedding reception in David Soul's villa in Los Angeles. Their son Tim was born on 14 October 1985. Will supervised some of his wife's recordings (including the Top 20 hit "So Long, Marianne" (in duet with TV host Ron Brandsteder in 1984) and the album "Herinnering" with Bonnie Saint Claire with Dutch cover versions of ABBA songs in 1985). Then he was involved in the production of the Dutch version of the children's musical Abbacadabra.

Moreover, he produced famous Dutch artists, like André van Duin, Bonnie St. Claire or Benny Neyman (with whom he scored the #1 hit "Waarom fluister ik je naam nog" in the Netherlands) but also international performers (such as Gheorghe Zamfir , Vicky Leandros, Nana Mouskouri and David Soul.). During the 1980s, Hoebee was an A&R manager at the CNR label and later at Koch records.

== Later career ==
He slowed down his career in the music business in the 1990s. In 2004, he took part in a music internet portal "muziekmaken.nl" (nowadays defunct) in which José wrote a weekly column. He also produced a TV talent show (Tijd Voor Talent) hosted by his wife and aired on a Dutch local channel "VSM TV". In 2009, he recorded with Piet Souer a new rendering of a Phil Spector classic hit (Be My Baby) performed by former BZN member Anny Schilder and José Hoebee. He died in a hospital in Hasselt on 10 June 2012 of cancer.

== Bibliography ==
- "500 Nr.1 Hits uit de Top 40", book by Johan van Slooten, Gottmer Becht Publishing, 1997
- "Top 40 Hitdossier 1956-2005 (9e editie)", book by Johan van Slooten, Gottmer Bech Publishing, 2006
- "50 jaar nummer-1-hits 1956-2006", book by Johan van Slooten, Gottmer Uitgevers Groep, 2006
- "Albumdossier 1969-2002", book by Johan van Slooten, Becht's Uitgevers, 2002
