= One More Little Kissie =

Single by Luv'

from the album True Luv' (1980 edition); Forever Yours
- B-side: "I Win It"
- Released: May 1980
- Recorded: 1980
- Genre: Pop
- Length: 3:49
- Label: CNR/Carrere Records
- Songwriters: Hans van Hemert and Piet Souer (a.k.a. Janschen & Janschens)
- Producer: Hans van Hemert

Luv' singles chronology
"Ann-Maria" (1980)	"One More Little Kissie" (1980)	"My Number One" (1980)

"One More Little Kissie" (also credited as "One More Little Kissy") is the eleventh single by the Dutch girl group Luv', released in May 1980 by CNR/Carrere Records. This song appears on the 1980 reissue of the True Luv' album and the Forever Yours LP. It was the last single featuring Patty Brard who left Luv' a couple of months after its release.

== Background ==
Even if Ooh, Yes I Do and Ann-Maria were successful, their sales didn't reach those of You're the Greatest Lover and Trojan Horse. Luv' recorded a pop track containing exotica and bubblegum pop elements: One More Little Kissy, hoping to have bigger success. However, this song did not achieve the desired results. Moreover, due to intern conflicts, Patty Brard decided to leave Luv' in August 1980 as the group was promoting the single. Because the pop act had legal obligations all over the world with its limited company (Interluv'), a new member had to be found. A model and limbo dancer, Ria Thielsch, was chosen to replace Patty.

In 2025, "One More Little Kissy" was remixed as part of Only Luv' – The Matt Pop Remixes.

== Commercial performance ==
"One More Little Kissie" was a Dutch Top 10 hit and reached the Top 20 in Flanders (Belgium). It was a minor chart entry in Germany.

== Cover versions ==
- In 1980, the German and Danish compilation "Charlie Hit Parade" included the cover version of "One More Little Kissy".
- In 1980, the Dutch compilation "Draaiorgel Hits" featured an instrumental version played by an organ.
- In 1982, the Brazilian girl group Harmony Cats recorded a Portuguese-language cover of the song titled "A Felicidade é Fácil de Achar". The track appeared on their self-titled album, issued by RGE Discos.

== Charts ==
=== Weekly charts ===
Chart (1980)	Peak position
Belgium/Flanders (BRT Top 30)	15
Belgium/Flanders (Ultratop)	23
Germany (Media Control Charts/Musikmarkt)	75
Netherlands (Dutch Top 40)	9
Netherlands (Nationale Hitparade (currently Single Top 100)	4

=== Year-end charts ===
Chart (1980)	Position
Netherlands (Nationale Hitparade) 1980	94
Netherlands (Dutch Top 40) 1980	96
