= True Luv' =

Studio album by Luv'
- Released: 1979; 1980 (new track lisiting); 2006 (Remastered, as part of the Completely in Luv' box set)
- Recorded: 1978
- Genres: Pop, disco
- Length: 40:47
- Labels: CNR/Carrere Records (original release); Universal Music Netherlands (2006 re-issue)
- Producer: Hans van Hemert

Luv' chronology
| Lots of Luv' (1979) | True Luv' (1979) | Greatest Hits (1979) |

True Luv' is the third album by Dutch girl group Luv', released in December 1979 by CNR/Carrere Records. It includes the hit singles "Ooh, Yes I Do" and "Ann-Maria" scored in the charts of European countries and also in a new territory: Mexico. In 1980, Luv's record company decided to re-issue the album by changing the track listing. The songs "Cloud nr.9" and "Let There Be Love" were replaced by "One More Little Kissie" (which was released as a single and became a hit record in Benelux) and "I Win It". In 2006, this LP has been reissued in digitally remastered form by Universal Music Netherlands as part of the Completely in Luv' box set.

== Album history ==
In the summer of 1979, Luv' and its producers and songwriters (Hans van Hemert and Piet Souer) planned to leave Philips Records/Phonogram Records (the record company which had released the group's records for two years). José Hoebee, Patty Brard, Marga Scheide and their team signed a 750.000 Dutch guilder contract with CNR/Carrere Records. With this new deal considered by the newspaper De Telegraaf as "the show business transfer of the year", Luv's challenge was to prove that after one year and a half of mainstream success, the trio could still score hit records in the music charts.

The first album of the ladies released by CNR/Carrere was entitled True Luv'. It was recorded at the famous Wisseloord Studios by the same team as the two previous albums, With Luv' (1978) and Lots of Luv' (1979). This opus is a mixture of Pop music, Disco, Latin American music sounds and Schlager, while its final track, "Let There Be Love" had a romantic sound and video that made the slow song distinctly similar to ABBA's "I Have a Dream".

Three songs taken from this LP were issued as singles. "Ooh, Yes I Do" and "Ann-Maria" were instant hits in the Benelux and Denmark, and reached the Top 50 in Germany and France. In order to reach the Latin American market, Spanish versions of these tracks were recorded and became successful in Mexico.

== Track listing ==
All tracks written by Janschen & Janschens (a.k.a. Hans van Hemert & Piet Souer) unless otherwise noted.

=== Side A ===
1. "Ooh, Yes I Do" (Hans van Hemert) – 2:57
2. "Ann-Maria" (Piet Souer) – 4:40
3. "Rhythm 'n' Shoes" (van Hemert) – 3:07
4. "Flash" (van Hemert) – 3:51
5. "Boys Goodnight" (Souer) – 2:40
6. "Daddy, What a Life" (Souer) – 3:08

=== Side B ===
1. "Cloud Nr. 9" (van Hemert) – 3:25
2. "Wine, Women and Song" (van Hemert) – 3:45
3. "Getaway" (Souer) – 3:03
4. "Stop Me" (Souer) – 3:09
5. "My Guy" – 3:49
6. "Let There Be Love" – 2:39

== 1980 LP version and 2006 bonus tracks ==
True Luv' was reissued in 1980 with changes in the track listing:

- "One More Little Kissie" (Janschen & Janschens) – 3:50

This song replaced "Cloud nr.9", initially track #1, side 2

- "I Win It" (Janschen & Janschens) – 3:05

This song replaced "Let there be love", initially track #6, side 3

True Luv' was also remastered and reissued in 2006 as part of the Completely in Luv' box set with the original 1979 track listing and three bonus tracks:

13. "Si, Que Si" (Alfred Garrido, Hans van Hemert) – 3:05
  - Spanish Version of Ooh, Yes I Do
14. "Ann-Maria" (Alfred Garrido, Piet Souer) – 4:04
  - Spanish version
15. "All You Need Is Luv' Jingle" (Janschen & Janschens) – 0:12

== Singles ==
| # | Singles | Date |
|---|---|---|
| 1. | "Ooh, Yes I Do" | November 1979 |
| 2. | "Ann-Maria" | February 1980 |
| 3. | "One More Little Kissie" | May 1980 |

== Personnel ==
Luv'

- José Hoebee – vocals
- Marga Scheide – vocals
- Patty Brard – vocals

Additional personnel

- Ernö Olah & Metropole Orkest – strings

=== Production ===
- Producer: Hans van Hemert
- Arranger/conductor: Piet Souer
- Recorded at Wisseloord and DMC Studios
- Recording engineers: Pieter Boer and John Sonneveld
- Mastering: www.pat-sound.nl

=== Design ===
- Photography: Claude Vanheye
- Design: Myosotis
- Art Direction: Clouds Studio

== Charts ==
Luv' was more successful in the singles charts than in the album charts, at a time when the 45 PM vinyl records were popular formats (especially among youngsters in the late 1970s which represented the majority of the group's fans). That's why the chart performance of the Luv' albums was not as great as the singles ones.

True Luv' reached the gold status in the Netherlands.

| Country | Album charts | Peak position | Certification (if any) | Sales/shipments |
|---|---|---|---|---|
| Netherlands | LP Top 50 | 13 | Gold | 50,000+ |
| Netherlands | Nationale Hitparade LP Top 50 | 7 | Gold | 50,000+ |
