= Ann-Maria (song) =

Single by Luv'

from the album True Luv'
- B-side: "Flash"
- Released: February 1980
- Recorded: 1979
- Genre: Pop
- Length: 4:38
- Label: CNR/Carrere Records (Europe); Discos Musart (Mexico)
- Songwriter: Piet Souer
- Producer: Hans van Hemert

Luv' singles chronology
"Ooh, Yes I Do" (1979)	"'Ann-Maria'" (1980)	"One More Little Kissie" (1980)

"Ann-Maria" is a pop song, the tenth single to be released by the Dutch girl group Luv', released in early 1980 by Carrere Records. This song appears on the group's third studio album, True Luv'. A downtempo composition, the tune was a chart hit in both Benelux and Germany.

== Background ==
When Luv' left Philips/Phonogram Records for CNR/Carrere Records in 1979, the trio hoped that its success story would go on. The single Ooh, Yes I Do became successful (even if it didn't reach the results of the million-sellers You're the Greatest Lover or Trojan Horse). The ballad Ann Maria was chosen as a follow-up single and used a Latin American orchestration inspired by ABBA's Chiquitita and Fernando as well as Boney M.'s El Lute. A children's choir was integrated into this song (like ABBA's classic hit "I Have a Dream"). A Spanish version of Ann-Maria came out in Mexico.

In 2025, the track was remixed as part of Only Luv' – The Matt Pop Remixes.

== Commercial performance ==
Ann-Maria was a top ten hit in Flanders (Belgium), a top 20 hit in the Netherlands and a top 40 hit in Germany.

== Charts ==
=== Weekly charts ===
Chart (1980)	Peak position
Netherlands (Dutch Top 40)	11
Netherlands (Nationale Hitparade (currently Single Top 100)	4
Belgium/Flanders (BRT Top 30)	10
Belgium/Flanders (Ultratop)	14
Germany (Media Control Charts/Musikmarkt)	37

=== Year-end charts ===
Chart (1980)	Position
Netherlands (Nationale Hitparade) 1980	45
Netherlands (Dutch Top 40) 1980	100
Belgium/Flanders (Ultratop) 1980	89

== Bibliography ==
- "Top 40 Hitdossier 1956–2005 (9e editie)", book by Johan van Slooten, Gottmer Bech Publishing, 2006
