= Luv' =

Dutch girl group

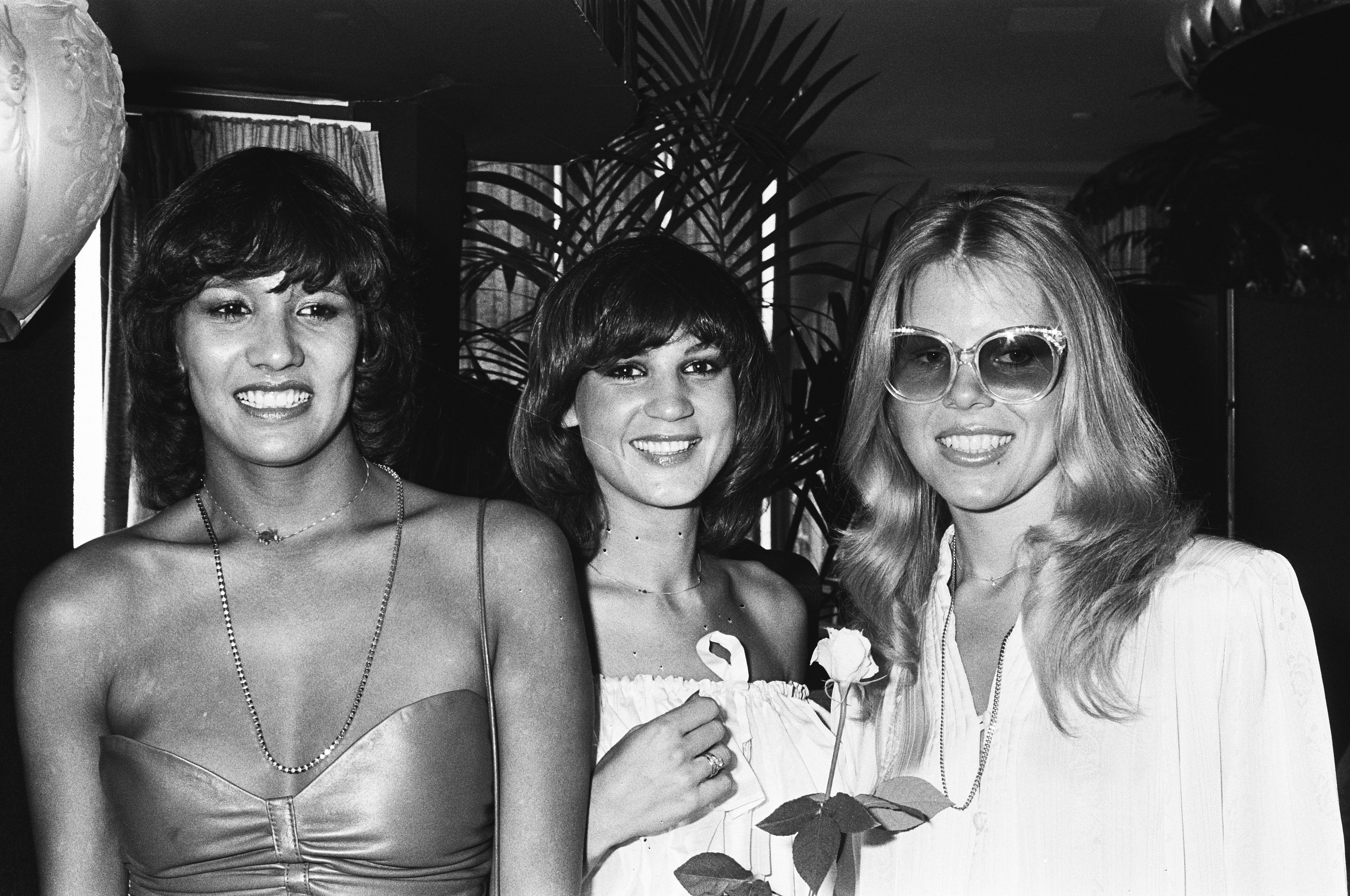
- The original Luv' trio in 1979 (from left to right: Patty Brard, José Hoebee and Marga Scheide)

Background information
- Origin: Amsterdam, Netherlands
- Genres: Pop, Nederpop, disco, dance
- Years active: 1977–1981, 1989–1996, 2005–2012, 2015–2020
- Labels: Philips/Phonogram/Mercury; CNR/Carrere; High Fashion/Dureco; RCA/BMG; Arcade; Pure Golden; Hit It! Music; Concerto Records
- Past members: Marga Scheide; José Hoebee; Patty Brard; Ria Thielsch; Diana van Berlo; Michelle Gold; Carina Lemoine; Chimène van Oosterhout
- Website: Official Facebook page

Luv' were a Dutch girl group that scored a string of hit records in Continental Europe (Benelux, Germany, Switzerland, Austria, France, Spain, Denmark, Norway and Finland) as well as Israel, South Africa, Zimbabwe, Australia, New Zealand, Canada, Argentina and Mexico in the late 1970s and early 1980s. The original members were Patty Brard, José Hoebee and Marga Scheide. In 1979, Luv' was 'Holland's best export act' and thus received the Conamus Export Prize.

The band sold more than seven million records worldwide (singles and albums). Among their greatest hits were: "U.O.Me (Welcome to Waldolala)", "You're the Greatest Lover", "Trojan Horse", "Casanova" and "Ooh, Yes I Do". The formation went through line-up changes and the original singers reunited several times. They gave a farewell performance on 11 August 2012 in Spaarnwoude at the Dutch Valley Festival. Two members of the pop act have had a successful solo career in their homeland: Patty as a TV personality and José as a vocalist. In 2014, Marga, José and Ria Thielsch (who already replaced Patty in 1980) decided to relaunch Luv'. In July 2017, the ladies celebrated their 40th anniversary. On 4 January 2019, the group announced another line-up change in De Telegraaf: media personality Chimène van Oosterhout replaced Ria Thielsch. The renewed trio released a Latin pop-reggaeton single entitled With Him Tonight in July 2019, twenty-five years after their last album All You Need Is Luv'. On 7 February 2020, the group's management stated that Luv' stopped all their activities due to José's ill health.

In recent years, a series of reissues and remix projects has kept their legacy alive, including Trojan Horse (Kav Verhouzer Remix), All You Need Is Luv' (Remastered & Expanded Edition) on CD, vinyl, and digital platforms and a full remix album Only Luv' – The Matt Pop Remixes set for release on May 24, 2025, offering new takes on Luv's songs using the original master tapes.

== Biography ==
=== Formation ===
In 1976, record producers Hans van Hemert and Piet Souer, assisted by manager Han Meijer, twenty years before the Spice Girls phenomenon, decided to form a girl group, inspired by the German disco trio Silver Convention. They had already recorded the music of a self-penned track ("My Man") and were looking for singers. They recruited three women:

- José Hoebee, born on 29 March 1954 in Best. She started her career as a semi-professional vocalist in the early 1970s as a member of a folk & country band, 'Young Tradition', with her two sisters. This formation took part in talent shows, changed its name into 'Elongi' and recorded a single produced by Piet Souer who suggested José to join Luv'.
- Marga Scheide, born on 15 February 1954 in Amsterdam. She was involved in many beauty pageants and appeared on the covers of various artist hit compilations.
- Patty Brard, from Sorong in New Guinea, born on 25 March 1955, who first worked as a secretary in the office of Hans van Hemert who offered her a career in the show business.

==== 1977–1978: Breakthrough ====
After the singles "My Man" (#12 in the Netherlands and a Flemish Top 10 hit) and Dream, Dream (which failed to enter the charts) in 1977, Van Hemert was commissioned by VPRO television to write the theme song for the Wim T. Schippers-written TV series Het is weer zo laat! (also known as Waldolala), a spin-off from Van Oekel's Discohoek (1974). With the help from Souer, he composed "U.O.Me (Welcome to Waldolala)" which was recorded by the girls. Moreover, Luv's appearance performing the song on this TV show during the opening credit was a great publicity stunt. It became an instant hit in the Netherlands and Flanders (Belgium) (a Top 5 hit in both countries).

==== 1978–1981: International career ====
The "You're the Greatest Lover" single was their international breakthrough in 1978 and sold one million copies. Apart from their homeland, Luv' entered the music charts in Belgium, France, Germany, Spain, Austria, Switzerland, Denmark, Norway, Finland, Israel, South Africa, Rhodesia, Australia, New Zealand, Canada, Argentina and Mexico. The follow-up singles ("Trojan Horse" (another million-seller), "Casanova", "Ooh, Yes I Do"...) were also successful. Their albums were big selling records (especially With Luv' and Lots of Luv').

In 1978–1979, Luv' was 'Holland's best export act' and received for their entire oeuvre the Export award from Conamus, a foundation dedicated to the promotion and support of Dutch music abroad.

In Germany, the trio was often invited on two popular TV programs: Disco and Musikladen. "You're the Greatest Lover" (which sold 500.000 copies in Goethe's country and earned a gold certification) was also used for the soundtrack of an episode of Derrick TV series. Two decades later, a dance music oriented cover version of this track by Loona renamed "Latino Lover" was a hit single in German-speaking countries (#6 and gold single (250 000 units sold) in Germany, #9 in Austria and #6 in Switzerland in 2000).

Some tracks were recorded in Spanish. "Eres Mi Mejor Amante" (a.k.a. "You're the Greatest Lover") was a hit in Spain and "Si, Que Si" (a.k.a. "Ooh, Yes I Do") reached the gold status in Mexico.

Their songs were also popular behind the Iron Curtain, especially in East Germany, Poland and Hungary. However, records distribution was limited in the Eastern Bloc. Sales were indeed difficult to evaluate in this part of the world.

In 1979, the three singers, their producers and their new manager (Han Meijer was replaced by Pim Ter Linde who ran Interlinde Management) changed their strategy for better opportunities. That's why, they founded a limited company, Interluv'/Luv' BV, to control every aspect of their career. They chose a new publisher and a new record company. After a deal with Philips Records, they signed a 750.000 Dutch guilder contract with CNR, a Dutch label affiliated to Carrere Records, a French company.

Soon after the release of the "One More Little Kissie" single, Patty Brard left the band in August 1980. She was replaced by a model and limbo dancer from the Ricardo and The Flames revue, Ria Thielsch born on 25 August 1951 in Manokwari, New Guinea. Ria was officially introduced to the public when the "My Number One" single and the Forever Yours album were released in the fall of 1980. These records sold well in the Netherlands and Belgium. Luv' was supposed to take part in the World Popular Song Festival (also known as the "Yamaha Music Festival" and considered as the "Oriental Eurovision") in November 1980 with the song "Be My Lover Tonight". Instead of it, Luv' cancelled their participation to this competition and preferred to perform on the Musikladen TV show in Germany.

==== 1981: Break-up ====
In March 1981, the girls and their team announced their break-up at the time they had planned to promote their recordings in new territories (Japan, Soviet Union....). To the public's great surprise, the group made a farewell performance on 22 July 1981 on the Nederland Muziekland show on Veronica (TV channel) by singing "Tingalingaling" (which was released as a single). This final broadcast was filmed in Spakenburg. Luv' also appeared at the Efteling theme park during Hitkrant's Zomerspelen (a summer multi-sport event with Dutch celebrities which was organized by teen magazine Hitkrant). They were expected to sing at a UNICEF gala in Greece but their participation in this show was called off. Then the compilation album Goodbye Luv' (1981) came out.

=== Comebacks ===
==== 1988: Samen ====
In 1988, the original line-up was reunited for a Dutch TV charity show (Samen) hosted by Mies Bouwman. Luv' later planned to record a comeback album. The British producers Stock, Aitken & Waterman were said to produce this opus. However, nothing materialized.

==== 1989–1992: New formula ====
Marga Scheide (only original member) and two other singers, Diana van Berlo and Michelle Gold recorded as Luv' a single ("Welcome to My Party") which reached the 22nd position on the Dutch charts and the 28th position on the Flemish charts in the autumn of 1989. Moreover, the trio was involved with other Dutch acts in the 'All Stars' project to help Third World children with the "Starmaker" single. In 1990, Michelle Gold was replaced by another vocalist, Carina Lemoine. During the Gulf War, Luv' performed in Dubai to support the Dutch troops. The formation disbanded in 1992.

==== 1993–1996: Luv' Gold ====
Due to the success of ABBA and Boney M. compilations, the original Luv' girls got together. An anthology CD (Luv' Gold) and a medley single ("Megamix '93") were released in 1993 and peaked respectively at #14 and #23 on the Dutch charts. The ladies went on tour in the Netherlands, Belgium, Germany and Denmark. Then their last studio album All You Need Is Luv' (1994) was issued by an independent label (Roman Disc) and only available in Kruidvat (a Dutch chain of drugstores). Luv' performed sporadically and broke up again in 1996.

==== 2005–2012: Back in Luv' ====
In 2003, a double CD compilation, 25 Jaar Na Waldolala, was released by Universal Music Netherlands to celebrate their 25th anniversary. This greatest hits album featured bonus tracks: Spanish versions of four hit singles as well as José and Marga's solo recordings.

In 2005, Luv' made a surprise performance at the 60th birthday of Hans van Hemert. One year later, a reality TV show about their comeback (Back in Luv) was broadcast on RTL 5 (a Dutch TV channel) and on VTM (a Flemish channel). A DVD (also entitled Back in Luv') and a box set (Completely in Luv') with bonus tracks and remixes came out. On 26, 27 and 28 May 2006, Luv' and Bobby Farrell (of Boney M.) were the guest stars during three big shows of De Toppers at the Amsterdam Arena. Until 2008, they had a hectic schedule. They often performed on TV and were booked for live performances (in clubs, private parties, corporate events and festivals).

In the later years, concerts were sporadic mainly due to the fact that Patty Brard was a busy TV personality. In the 2000s and early 2010s, Luv' was one of the few manufactured bands of the disco and dance era to be on stage with the original line-up (unlike Boney M. and Village People). Marga announced in a radio interview on NOS their definitive break-up in March 2012. They gave their final performance on 11 August 2012 in Spaarnwoude at the Dutch Valley Festival.

==== 2015–2018: Resurrection ====
In May 2015, the 1980–1981 line-up of Luv' (Marga, José and Ria) took part in the release party of a photo book The Story of Luv (including exclusive pictures of the ladies) at the Wisseloord Studios in Hilversum. Dutch illusionist Hans Klok attended this event. Patty Brard was opposed to this project. The publication was eventually banned due to copyright issues.

In March 2016, Marga and José announced another comeback of Luv' in De Telegraaf. Patty was not involved in this comeback and was replaced by Ria Thielsch. Luv' intended to go on tour and record a new repertoire produced by Juan Cristóbal Losada. On 1 October 2016, they performed at the Studio 54 party at the Sportpaleis in Antwerp, Belgium with Earth, Wind & Fire experience feat. Al MacKay, Jocelyn Brown and Kate Ryan. In July 2017, they celebrated their 40th anniversary with fans in Best.

==== 2019: A surprising line-up change ====
On 4 January 2019, the group announced an unexpected line-up change in De Telegraaf: media personality Chimène van Oosterhout replaced Ria Thielsch. In July 2019, Luv' released a Latin pop-reggaeton single entitled With Him Tonight with Latin Grammy-nominated producers Keith Morrison and Manuel Garrido-Lecca.

=== 2020: Luv's end ===
On 7 February 2020, Luv' (which had not performed since September 2019 due to José Hoebee's illness) informed the media and the public about the interruption of their activities.

=== 2021–2026: reissues and remixes ===
2021 saw the reissue of two albums and several singles on digital platforms: All You Need Is Luv' (April 2021), Sincerely Yours (June 2021) and the four singles/maxi-singles taken from it ("Hasta Mañana", "Jungle Jive", "The Last Song" and "He's My Guy") as well as "This Old Heart of Mine" (October 2021).

On February 11, 2022, Cloud 9 Music released Trojan Horse (Kav Verhouzer Remix) as a digital single. Two days later, this remix entered the Dutch iTunes Top 100 at #10. One week later, it dropped out of this chart.

All You Need Is Luv' was reissued on a double CD and digital platforms by Hit It! Music on March 14, 2025, in a "Remastered & Expanded Edition". This re-release featured the original track listing on CD 1 and the Ladies on Mars remixes on CD 2. In anticipation of this reissue, seven Ladies On Mars remixes were released as digital singles between October 2024 and March 2025: Luv' Medley (Ladies On Mars Re-Touch Remix), Don't Stop Now (Ladies On Mars Remix), "Don't Stop Now (Ladies On Mars Extended Remix)", You're The Greatest Lover (Ladies On Mars Re-Construction Mix), "You're The Greatest Lover (Ladies On Mars Re-Construction Extended Mix)", "Let's Go To The Paradise Of Love (Ladies On Mars Remix)", "Let's Go To The Paradise Of Love (Ladies On Mars Extended Remix)". Moreover, All You Need Is Luv' (Remastered & Expanded Edition) was also re-released exclusively for Record Store Day 2025 on April 12, 2025, as a limited edition release on pink and blue vinyl.

On May 24, 2025, the remix album Only Luv' – The Matt Pop Remixes was released, featuring remixes of Luv's greatest hits and lesser-known songs by producer Matt Pop, using original master tapes provided by Hans van Hemert and Universal Music. The album was available on CD and in a limited-edition double vinyl (pink and blue), as well as on streaming platforms. Ahead of the album's release, two singles and an EP were issued on digital platforms: "Eeny Meeny Miny Moe (Matt Pop Album Mix)" on April 25, 2025, "I.M.U.R. (Matt Pop Album Remix)" on May 9, 2025, and "Eeny Meeny Miny Moe / I.M.U.R. / Si Que Si – The Matt Pop Remixes EP" on May 23, 2025. Following the release of the remix album, additional digital singles were made available to maintain momentum: "You're the Greatest Lover (Matt Pop Album Remix)" on June 13, 2025, "Don Juanito de Carnaval (Matt Pop Album Remix)" on July 22, 2025, "Trojan Horse (Matt Pop 2025 Extended Remix)" on August 18, 2025, and "Life Is On My Side (Matt Pop Remixes)" on November 28, 2025. Luv' unveiled a sequel to Only Luv’, entitled Only Luv’ – The Matt Pop Remixes (Extended Versions), on CD on October 31, 2025, and on streaming platforms on December 19, 2025.

On January 30, 2026, Wunder Music, a division of the Dutch label Cloud 9 Recordings B.V, released "You're The Greatest Lover (Otto Wunderbar Remix)" for the Après ski and Carnival festivities in the Netherlands.

On April 18, 2026, Universal Music released "The Hits EP", featuring Luv's four most successful singles (U.O.Me (Theme from Waldolala), You're the Greatest Lover, Trojan Horse and Casanova), exclusively on vinyl for the Dutch edition of Record Store Day.

== Record deals ==
Luv' was inspired by ABBA that had dealt with various record companies to control the distribution of their records.

The female pop act had a contract with Philips Records/Phonogram from 1977 to 1979. Afterwards, the trio signed a 750.000 Dutch Guilder record deal with CNR, a label affiliated to Carrere Records. This contract (which lasted from 1979 to 1981) was considered by the newspaper De Telegraaf as "the show business transfer of the year". As they changed their label, the girls also changed their publishing company (which controlled the copyright of their songs). Their first publisher was Banananas Music during their Phonogram years and their second one was Roba Musik Verlag during their CNR/Carrere period.

Phonogram and CNR licensed the rights for their records to various labels around the world. For example, Luv's records were released by Private Stock Records in the UK, by Carrere Records in German-speaking countries, by WEA in Japan, by West and Meteor labels in Turkey or by Discos Musart in Mexico. There were eighty-seven record pressings in about forty countries.

In 1979, the three singers, their producers and their manager founded a limited company (Interluv'/Luv' B.V) to control every aspect of their career. Two years later, as the formation disbanded, it ended its legal obligations.

When Marga Scheide formed a new Luv’ trio with two new members and without the original producers, she signed a deal with High Fashion Records/Dureco to release in 1989 a mini-album, For You, which included the moderate hit "Welcome to My Party") and later another contract with RCA/BMG for the Sincerely Yours album.

In 1993, when the original line-up was reunited, the vocalists had a new deal with Arcade Records for the release of the Luv' Gold compilation which entered the album charts in the Netherlands.

Then, they recorded their last studio album All You Need Is Luv' (1994), issued by an independent label (Roman Disc) and only available in Kruidvat, a Dutch chain of drugstores.

Luv's back catalogue currently belongs to Hans van Hemert Productions, Universal Music Netherlands, which released compilations like 25 Jaar Na Waldolala (2003) and Completely in Luv' (2006), Marga Scheide and independent label Hit It! Music.

== Line-ups ==
- Marga Scheide (1976–1981, 1988–1996, 2005–2012, 2015–2020)
- José Hoebee (1976–1981, 1988, 1993–1996, 2005–2012, 2015–2020)
- Ria Thielsch (1980–1981, 2015–2019)
- Chimène van Oosterhout (2019–2020)
- Patty Brard (1976–1980, 1988–1989, 1993–1996, 2005–2012)
- Diana van Berlo (1989–1992)
- Michelle Gold (1989–1990)
- Carina Lemoine (1990–1992)

== Discography ==
- With Luv' (1978)
- Lots of Luv' (1979)
- True Luv' (1979)
- Forever Yours (1980)
- Sincerely Yours (1991)
- All You Need Is Luv' (1994)

== Awards and certifications ==
- Netherlands:
  - 1978-1979: "You're the Greatest Lover" and "Trojan Horse": gold and platinum singles
  - 1978: Veronica Top 40 Awards for reaching the number one position in the Top 40 with the singles "You're the Greatest Lover" and "Trojan Horse"
  - 1979: "With Luv'" and "Lots of Luv'": gold and platinum albums
  - 1979: Conamus Export Award for being the best Dutch Export music act (sales of 2.5 million records between 1977 and 1979).
  - 1980: "True Luv'": gold album
- Belgium:
  - 1979: "Trojan Horse": gold single
- Germany:
  - 1979: "You're the Greatest Lover": Gold single (650.000 units sold)
- Austria:
  - 1979: "Trojan Horse": gold single
- Denmark:
  - 1979: "With Luv'": silver album
- Mexico:
  - 1980: "Si Que Si" (Spanish version of "Ooh, Yes I Do" single): gold single
