= My Number One (Luv' song) =

Single by Luv'

from the album Forever Yours
- B-side: "The Show Must Go On"
- Released: October 1980
- Recorded: 1980
- Genre: Pop
- Length: 3:14
- Label: CNR/Carrere Records
- Songwriters: Hans van Hemert and Piet Souer (a.k.a. Janschen & Janschens)
- Producer: Hans van Hemert

Luv' singles chronology
"One More Little Kissie" (1980)	"My Number One" (1980)	"Tingalingaling" (1981)

"My Number One" is the twelfth single by the Dutch girl group Luv', released in the autumn of 1980 by CNR/Carrere Records. The song appears on the Forever Yours album and was a chart success in Benelux and a minor hit in Germany. "My Number One" served as the official introduction to the public and the media of Luv's new member, Ria Thielsch (who replaced Patty Brard).

== Song information ==
Patty Brard suddenly left Luv' in August 1980 as the group was promoting One More Little Kissie. This departure had a negative impact as the group had legal obligations and had already recorded new material for an album. A new member was quickly added: Ria Thielsch (who like Patty had Indonesian and New Guinean origins). Though she made some appearances by performing One More Little Kissie on stage and on TV, Ria was officially introduced with the release of a new single: "My Number One". The track is a pop tune with military march-style elements and is considered Luv's best composition according to Hans van Hemert, the trio's producer.

== Cover version ==
In 1982, Brazilian Genghis Khan, a group inspired by the German band Dschinghis Khan, released a cover of "My Number One" as the B-side to their single "Apollo 50" on the label "Young".

== Commercial performance ==
The song was a top five hit in the Netherlands and in Flanders (Belgium). It was Luv's last chart entry outside Dutch-speaking countries, ending the group's succession of export hits. It reached number 60 in Germany.

== Charts ==
=== Weekly charts ===
Chart (1980–1981)	Peak position
Europarade (currently Eurochart Hot 100 Singles)	15
Netherlands (Dutch Top 40)	5
Netherlands (currently Single Top 100)	4
Belgium/Flanders (BRT Top 30)	5
Germany (Media Control Charts/Musikmarkt)	60

=== Year-end charts ===
Chart (1980–1981)	Position
Netherlands (Nationale Hitparade) 1980	71
Netherlands (Dutch Top 40) 1980	89
Netherlands (Dutch Top 40) 1981	219
