= Marga Scheide =

Dutch singer and former model (born 1954)

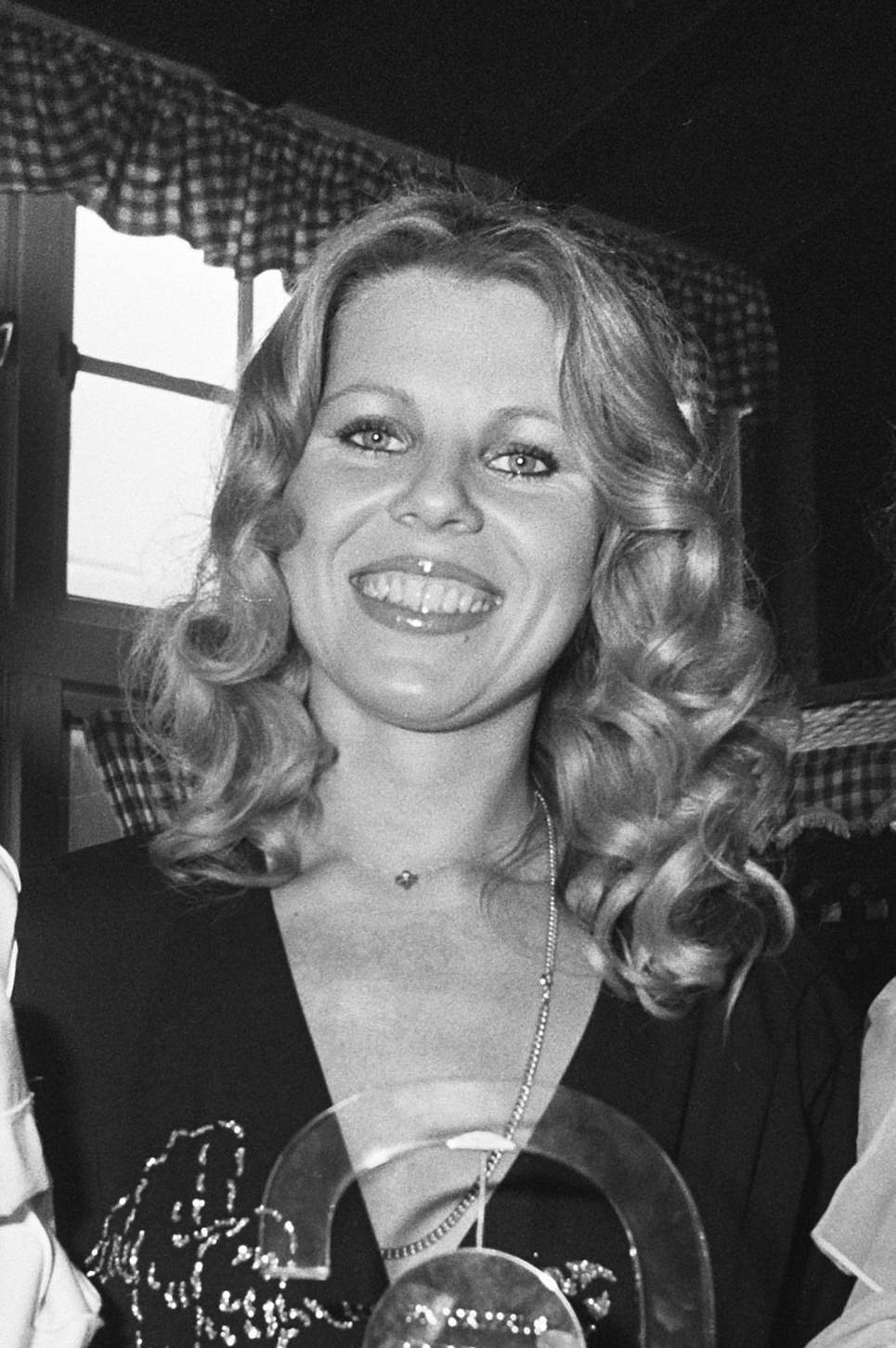
- Marga Scheide in 1979

Background information
- Born: Margareth Scheide; 15 February 1954 (age 72); Amsterdam, Netherlands
- Origin: Amsterdam, Netherlands
- Genres: Pop, Nederpop, disco
- Occupations: Singer, former model
- Years active: 1970–2022
- Labels: Polydor, Carrere, Universal Music, Dureco
- Formerly of: Luv'

Margareth "Marga" Scheide (born 15 February 1954) is a Dutch singer and former model, best known for being a member of the girl group Luv'. Alongside Patty Brard and José Hoebee, she scored a string of international hit songs such as "You're the Greatest Lover", "Trojan Horse", "Casanova" and "Ooh, Yes I Do". She was the only Luv' singer to be involved in all the incarnations of the group.

The formation went through line-up changes and the original singers reunited several times. In 2016, Marga, José and Ria Thielsch (who already replaced Patty in 1980) decided to relaunch Luv'. In July 2017, the ladies celebrated their 40th anniversary. On 4 January 2019 the group announced another line-up change in De Telegraaf: media personality Chimène van Oosterhout replaced Ria Thielsch. The renewed trio released a Latin pop-reggaeton single entitled With Him Tonight in July 2019, twenty-five years after their last album All You Need Is Luv'. On 7 February 2020 the group's management informed that Luv' stopped all their activities due to José's ill health. In addition to Luv', Marga was active as a solo singer. On 15 April 2022 she gave a farewell performance as a guest artist during Piv Huvluv's show in Belgium.

== Pre Luv' career ==
Scheide started her career as a model in her homeland in the early 1970s. She often appeared on the covers of Dutch various artist hit compilations. She also took part in several beauty contests (Miss Holland 1971, 1972, 1973, 1977, Miss Young Holland 1973, Miss Young International 1973 and Miss Elegance Miss Europa 1975). Moreover, Scheide participated in several advertising campaigns including lemonade SiSi, "bintje" (a potato variety), Quick Tanning and Yamaha motorcycles. In 1976, she was cast as a member of a girl group (Luv') created by two record producers, Hans van Hemert and Piet Souer.

== The Luv' years ==
From 1977 to 1981, Luv' (Marga Scheide, Patty Brard (replaced in August 1980 by Ria Thielsch) and José Hoebee) scored a string of hit records in a large part of Continental Europe (Benelux, Germany, Switzerland, Austria, Denmark, Finland, Norway, France, Spain) as well as Israel, South Africa, Zimbabwe, Australia, New Zealand, Canada, Argentina and Mexico. In March 1981, the group disbanded.

Eight years later, Scheide formed a new version of Luv' with two other vocalists (Diana van Berlo and Michelle Gold). This new line-up, dubbed "Marga's Luv" by fans, only scored a minor hit ("Welcome to my Party") on the Dutch Top 40 in the autumn of 1989 and never became as successful as the original trio. In the summer of 1990, Michelle Gold was replaced by Carina Lemoine. In 1992, the formation broke up again.

The original Luv' singers reunited twice (in 1993–1996 and in 2005–2012). In March 2016, Scheide, Hoebee and Thielsch announced another comeback of Luv' in De Telegraaf. The trio toured the nostalgia circuit in the Netherlands and Flanders (Belgium). On 4 January 2019 media personality Chimène van Oosterhout officially replaced Ria Thielsch. In July 2019, Luv' released a Latin pop-reggaeton single entitled With Him Tonight with Latin Grammy-nominated producers Keith Morrison and Manuel Garrido-Lecca.

On 7 February 2020 Luv' (which had not performed since September 2019 due to José Hoebee's illness) informed the media and the public about the interruption of their activities.

== Musical career without Luv' ==
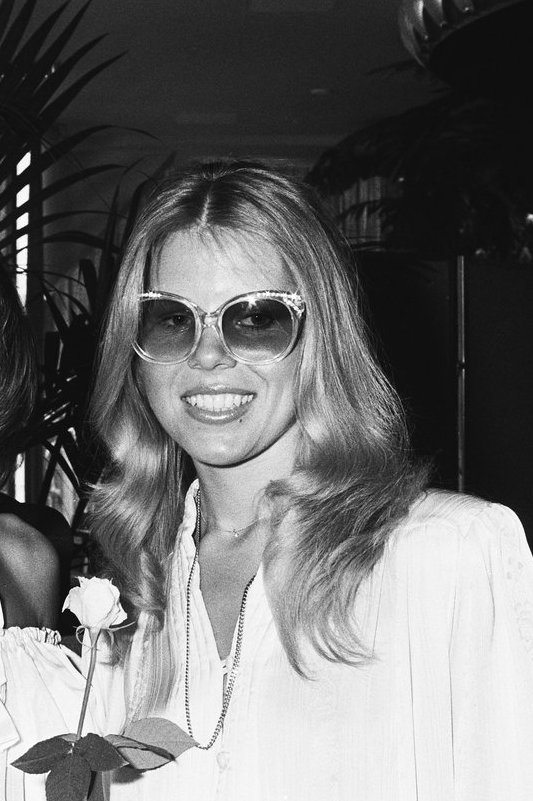
Scheide in 1979

Alongside José Hoebee, Scheide sang backing vocals on Dutch girl group Babe's 1981 single "Tick-A-Thums-My-Heart". The track was produced by Hans van Hemert and reached #16 on the Dutch Single Top 100 charts.

In 1982, Scheide was the lead member of another short-lived girl group Marga & Deuce with two twin sisters Clari and Anja Horsmeier who recorded a single ("One, Two, Three... Bananas"), however it failed to chart. The following year, Scheide released a solo single titled ("Love Symphony"), a medley of The Supremes hits. The single failed to char, even though it was broadcast on Black American radio stations.

In 1984–1985, she participated in a TV musical for children based on ABBA's songs and performed in Dutch: Abbacadabra. José Hoebee was also part of the cast of this show.

In 1992, alongside the singer Lisa Boray, Marga was briefly involved in another musical: Rockstar.

From October 2020 to April 2022, she appeared as a guest artist for a limited number of performances of Flemish comedian Piv Huvluv as part of his Vinylvreter tour. She gave a farewell performance at CC De Spil in Roeselare, Belgium, on 15 April 2022.

== Discography ==
=== Singles ===
- "One, Two, Three...Bananas" (Marga & Deuce, Polydor, 1982)
- "Love Symphony" (Carrere, 1983)
- "Wij Zijn Vrij" (Abbacadabra, Indisc, 1984)
- "Love Again" (Boni, 1985)
- "I'll Sing You a Song (He Ho)" (Dureco, 1986)

=== Albums ===
- Abbacadabra (Indisc, 1984)

== Participation in Patty's Fort, Sterren Dansen Op Het IJs and Komen Eten ==
Scheide was the candidate on TV programs featuring Dutch celebrities.

- In 2004, she was filmed as she had a health cure in Ibiza on Patty's Fort (a reality show conceived by Patty Brard on Yorin).
- In 2006, she was a contestant in the Dutch version of Skating with Celebrities (Sterren Dansen Op Het IJs) on SBS6. This show pairs six champion figure skaters with six celebrities who have various degrees of ice skill. Each team is composed of one man and one woman and has to demonstrate a specific figure skating skill. Scheide was eliminated from the competition after the third competition.
- In 2011, she took part in Komen Eten (the Dutch version of Come Dine with Me).

== Entrepreneur ==
In 1989, she trademarked the name Luv'. This decision is valid in Benelux until November 2029.

In addition to her career in entertainment, she was involved in several businesses. In the mid-1980s, she was the owner of a souvenir shop named 'Dutchy Souvenirs' at Utrecht's Holiday Inn which remained active until 1993. She later ran another short-lived company to export make-up to Eastern Europe. In 2001, Scheide launched with Jacques Zwart an online music store (Selectcd.nl). In 2004, she supervised a website which specialised in Dutch celebrities merchandising (Selectidols.com). By 2007, Scheide's companies were dissolved.

In her later years, she has been involved in real estate in the Netherlands and Ibiza.

== Personal life ==
Between 1980 and 1984, Scheide was the partner of John de Mol, Endemol's founder.

Then, she had a relationship for nineteen years (1984–2003) with Jacques Zwart who produced her solo recordings and the Sincerely Yours album of Luv'. In the Spring of 2003, Zwart died of a heart attack in Ibiza.

Since 2005, Scheide has been living with Michiel Gunning (who was active in the music business and the youth press in the 1970s and 1980s).
