= Ooh, Yes I Do =

Single by Luv'

from the album True Luv'
- B-side: "My Guy"
- Released: November 1979
- Recorded: 1979
- Genre: Pop
- Length: 2:58
- Label: CNR/Carrere Records (Benelux, France, Spain, German speaking countries); EMI (Scandinavia); RCA Records (Italy); Discos Musart (Mexico); Moonshine records (South Africa)
- Songwriter: Hans van Hemert
- Producer: Hans van Hemert

Luv' singles chronology
"Eeny Meeny Miny Moe" (1979)	"'Ooh, Yes I Do'" (1979)	"Ann-Maria" (1980)

"Ooh, Yes I Do" is the ninth single by the Dutch girl group Luv', released in the autumn of 1979 by CNR/Carrere Records. The song appears on the group's 1979 third studio album True Luv'. It was a hit in Benelux, Denmark, France, Germany and Austria. The Spanish version of the record turned gold in Mexico.

== Background ==
In the summer of 1979, Luv' and their producers and songwriters (Hans van Hemert and Piet Souer) decided to leave Philips/Phonogram Records (which had released the group's records for two years). José Hoebee, Patty Brard, Marga Scheide and their team signed a 750,000 Dutch Guilder contract with CNR affiliated to Carrere Records on October 7, 1979. With this new deal, Luv's challenge was to prove that after one year and a half of mainstream success, the trio could still score hit records in the music charts. The formation's first single released by Carrere was "Ooh, Yes I Do", a track composed and produced by Van Hemert. The song used a melody inspired by the flute theme of ABBA's "Gimme! Gimme! Gimme! (A Man After Midnight)" (1979). It became an instant hit. A Spanish version (entitled "Si, Que Si") was recorded for the Latin American market and reached gold status in Mexico.

In 2021, DJ WR (Wouter Reinders) and DJ BarFeet (Maarten Bervoets) posted the uptempo remixes of "Ooh, Yes I Do" and "Si, Que Si" on their YesterMix's YouTube channel.

In 2025, the track was remixed as part of Only Luv' – The Matt Pop Remixes.

== Commercial performance ==
Ooh Yes I Do was a Top 5 hit in Denmark and the Netherlands, a Top 10 record in Belgium and France, a Top 20 single in Austria and a Top 30 song in Germany.

The single sold 200.000 copies in France.

== Track listing and release ==
CNR/Carrere licensed the rights for Luv's records to various labels worldwide.

7" Vinyl

- a. "Ooh, Yes I Do"
- b. "My Guy"

Countries	Year	Label	Catalog
Netherlands	1979	CNR/Carrere Records	49.565
Germany/Austria	1979	Carrere Records	2044165
France	1979	Carrere Records	49.565
Scandinavia	1979	EMI/Carrere Records	49.565
Spain	1979	Carrere Records	Car 0012
Italy	1979	RCA Records	PB 6459
Mexico	1979	Discos Musart	30603
South Africa	1979	Moonshine Records	

== Cover versions ==
- In 1980, Franz Lambert covered the song for the German compilation "Pop-Orgel Hit-Parade 6".
- In 1980, Bulgarian act Обектив covered the track as "S.O.S".
- In 2006, Dutch drag queen Lola recorded a version of "Ooh, Yes I Do".

== Charts and certification ==
=== Weekly charts ===
Chart (1979–1980)	Peak position
Europarade (currently Eurochart Hot 100 Singles)	10
Netherlands (Dutch Top 40)	5
Netherlands (Nationale Hitparade (currently Single Top 100)	4
Belgium/Flanders (BRT Top 30)	5
Belgium/Flanders (Ultratop)	7
Germany (Media Control Charts/Musikmarkt)	27
Austria (Ö3 Hitparade)	13
Denmark (BT Hitlisten)	2
France (SNEP chart)	10

=== Year-end charts ===
Chart (1979–1980)	Position
Netherlands (Nationale Hitparade) 1979	70
Netherlands (Dutch Top 40) 1979	84
Netherlands (Dutch Top 40) 1980	198
Belgium/Flanders (Ultratop) 1979	91
Germany (Media Control Charts/Musikmarkt) 1980	101

== Certification ==
"Si, que si", the Spanish version of "Ooh, Yes I Do", turned gold in Mexico in May 1980.
