= Carrere Records =

French record label

- Founded: 1962 (as Carrere Productions)
- Founder: Claude Carrere
- Defunct: 1993
- Distributor: Various
- Country of origin: France
- Location: Paris

Carrere Records (French: Disques Carrère, [disk kaʁɛʁ]) was a French record label which specialized in Euro disco and rock music. The record company was sold to Warner Music Group in the early 1990s.

== Early days ==
Claude Carrere started working with Annie Chancel in 1962 and renamed her Sheila, who remained his sole artist for a while. He set up Carrere Productions and the records were distributed by Philips Records. In the late 1960s, he created Disques Carrere. In 1972, he produced and distributed his own releases. A lot of singers would be signed alongside Sheila, the most important ones being Ringo (Sheila's husband), Dalida and even Claude François. In 1977, the disco group Sheila and B. Devotion was created and Carrere started exporting his releases.

== British record market ==
Claude Carrere decided to move into the British record market after the success of La Belle Époque single "Black Is Black", released in the United Kingdom through EMI, which reached number 2 in the UK Singles Chart. He appointed Freddie Cannon Managing Director (at that time, he was Commercial A&R Director at EMI Records UK) to head up his Carrere UK label. Cannon opened the Carrere offices at Hansa Records UK in June 1978 and signed a South African group named Clout. Carrere' UK's first release was Clout's single "Substitute", which went to number 2 in the UK Singles Chart in 1978. Cannon and A&R Manager Peter Hinton signed power pop band the Incredible Kidda Band and followed this in 1979 with the NWOBHM band Saxon. Cannon renamed the group "Saxon", since he could not work with their original name "Son of a Bitch". Saxon released their eponymous debut album the following year and stayed with the label until 1984. In 1981, Cannon signed Australian rock bands The Church and Rose Tattoo, and Don Dokken from the US. The label released also the final album by The Buggles, 1981's Adventures in Modern Recording, which was distributed in the United States through Columbia Records. Debbie Bonham also signed to Carrere and released her critically acclaimed album For You and the Moon in 1984. Cannon, working with Carrere Italy's Managing Director Luigi Arduino and Claude Carrere, signed Italian singer Raf and secured the rights for the worldwide distribution of his hit single "Self Control" in 1984. In the same year, Peter Hinton left the company.

In 1985, Carrere released "Move Closer", the only ballad from the label's Disco Queen Phyllis Nelson, and this number 1 song became the label's biggest selling single of all time in the UK. It is featured in over 300 compilations around the world. The same year, Carrere released Nana Mouskouri's "Only You" that went to number 2 in the British charts, and they released on the sub-label Stars Only Gloria Gaynor's single "My Love Is Music", produced by Didier Marouani.

== Musical reach ==
Carrere UK went on to help develop album selling artists for the Carrere label worldwide with groups like Demon, Rage, and Jim Capaldi. Saxon, Rose Tattoo, The Church, Dokken and Debbie Bonham were launched by Carrere and are still performing today.

Other artists of note on the label were Princess Stéphanie of Monaco (Stephanie), Dollar, who enjoyed a number of hits with the label, and Dutch girl group Luv' that scored successful singles (including 1979's "Ooh, Yes I Do" in Europe). Boney M. and Ottawan were also huge hits for the label. FR David also had a huge international hit with "Words".

== Carrere UK closure ==
In June 1988, exactly 10 years after opening the label in the UK, Cannon departed and closed down Carrere UK. He joined Pete Waterman and David Howells at PWL Records as International Director. Claude Carrere loaned his music company to Warner Music France.

In 1993, Carrere closed down, but the Carrere family still has the rights for its catalogs. Claude Carrere died April 10, 2014. Carrere was the only French label to have multiple international successes, including a number one Adult Contemporary hit in the US with "Friends and Lovers" by Gloria Loring and Carl Anderson.

== See also ==
- List of record labels
