= Patty Brard =

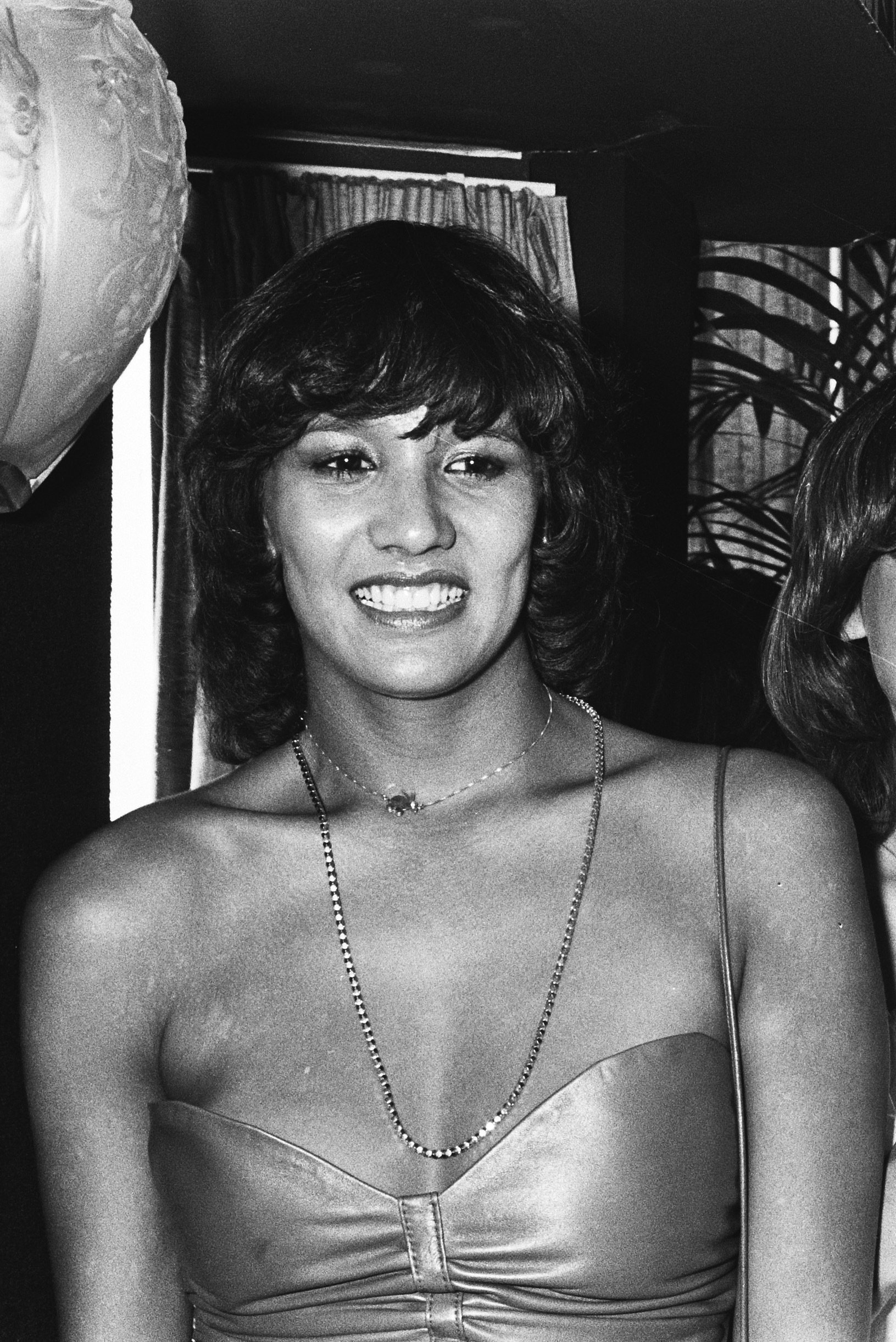
- Brard in 1979

Background information
- Born: Petula Louise Brard; March 25, 1955 (age 71); Sorong, Dutch New Guinea (present-day Southwest Papua, Indonesia)
- Origin: Rijswijk, Netherlands
- Genres: Pop, Nederpop, disco
- Occupations: Singer; television presenter; actress
- Years active: 1977–present
- Labels: Philips; Ultraphone; Striped Horse; Princess Entertainment

Petula Louise "Patty" Brard (born March 25, 1955) is a Dutch singer, television personality, actress and entrepreneur, most notable for being a former member of the girl group Luv'. For five decades, she has often hit the headlines of the tabloid press.

In the late 1970s, Luv' scored a string of international hit records such as "You're the Greatest Lover", "Trojan Horse", "Casanova" and "Ooh, Yes I Do" on the charts. Brard left Luv' in 1980 and went on to release a series of solo studio albums throughout the 1980s. The group reunited on several occasions.

Since 1983, Brard has been active on television as a host/presenter. She hosted the Candid Camera-like TV programs such as De Bananasplit Show and Gaan met die Banaan as well as the 1985 edition of the Sanremo Music Festival and the 2001 version of Big Brother. Inspired by the success of The Osbournes, she appeared in reality television shows that featured her life, the most popular being Patty's Posse (2003–2004). Her participation in the ice skating competition Sterren Dansen Op Het IJs (2007) and the celebrity diving competition Sterren Springen Op Zaterdag (also known as Celebrity Splash!) were highly covered events. Since 2007, she has been a showbiz expert on the entertainment news program Shownieuws on SBS6. Brard was also involved in other shows on the same channel including De Nieuwe Uri Geller ("The new Uri Geller"), Wie Ben Ik? ("Who Am I?"), K2 zoekt K3, Bonje Met De Buren ("Trouble With Neighbours").

In 2009, 2013, 2015 and 2019, she signed exclusive deals with SBS Broadcasting B.V. (taken over by Talpa Network in 2011). Currently, she is working as a freelance TV host.

Since February 2020, Patty Brard has launched collections of household items, jewellery and skincare lines in association with Kruidvat shops in the Netherlands.

== Early life ==
Petula Louise Brard was born on March 25, 1955, in Sorong, Dutch New Guinea (now Southwest Papua, Indonesia). She is of Indo (Dutch-Indonesian) descent, with some distant French and German heritage. The family moved to the Netherlands when Brard was eleven years old, settling in Rijswijk.

Her cousin Stanley Brard was a professional footballer with Feyenoord.

== Musical career ==
=== The Luv' years ===
In 1976, she was recruited by Hans van Hemert to be part of a girl group called Luv' with José Hoebee and Marga Scheide. On December 31, 1979, Luv' received the Buma Export Award. The trio scored a string of hit records in Benelux, Germany, Switzerland, Austria, Denmark, France, New Zealand, Australia, South Africa, Zimbabwe and Mexico. In 1980, she left the group and took part in two comebacks with Luv' (in 1993–1996 and in 2005–2012).

=== The Post Luv' era ===
In 1981, Brard was the first Luv' member to start a solo career. She recorded in the 1980s three albums (All This Way, You're in the Pocket and Red Light) in Los Angeles. She collaborated with sought-after session musicians (including Billy Preston, Paulinho Da Costa, Paul Jackson, Jr. and Jai Winding). Brard's American recordings were not as popular as those of Luv' (except the single "Hold On To Love" which was a Top 20 hit in the Netherlands, a Top 10 hit in Belgium and which reached the 12th position in South Africa in 1981).

She is used to record duets:

- In 1986, she performed the ballad "Tender Love", released as a single, with Eddie Kendricks.
- In 2000, she sang a track with Def Rhymz, a Dutch rapper.
- In 2004, she recorded the single "Huilen is voor jou te laat" with Jacques Herb, which was a minor hit on the Dutch charts (#64 on the Mega Top 100).
- In 2005, the duet "That's Life" with her lover Derick was the theme of Pat's Life, one of her reality television shows.
- In 2006, her Carnival song "Ik wil knallen" with Ome Henk became a Dutch Top 5 hit.
- In 2012, she released the digital single "Carnavals Party Hitmix" with Alex.
- In 2015, she put out the digital single "Bonje Met De Buren" with Joey Hartkamp and Jochem van Gelder.
- In 2017, the song "Wat Zijn Ze Lekker" (with Roy Donders) came out.
- In 2018, the song "We Zullen De Laatsten Zijn" (with Roy Donders) was released.
- In 2024, her duet "Feesten in de stad" with the reality star Kees de Bever came out.

In 1997, as the Spice Girls world phenomenon reached its peak, Brard hired five young women to form a short-lived female pop group Patty Cash. Hans van Hemert did the production on the quintet's recordings. Moreover, the same year, she was part of a Dutch All Stars choir (BN'ers voor BNN) which recorded "Hij gaat voor C", a parodic cover version of "We Are the World" that reached the 3rd position on the Dutch Top 40. Six years later, she briefly formed her own girls band "Enuv'", inspired by her experience as a Luv' member. In 2010, NRGY Music released Brard's Schlager oriented single "Het leven is een feest" (Life is a party) for the Carnival festivities in the Netherlands, which peaked at No. 8 in the Netherlands. In 2011, she had two other hits: "Waarom zou drinken een zonde zijn" (#21 on the Single Top 100) and "Bunga, Bunga" (#64 on the Single Top 100).

2022 saw her comeback as a solo singer as she released the Carnival single "In M'n Panterpak" on digital platforms. This song came out simultaneously with her panther-print collection for Kruidvat. It entered the Dutch iTunes Top 100 at #5 on February 18, 2022. It peaked at #2 on February 20, 2022. On March 3, 2022, it dropped out of this chart.

=== Discography ===
==== Albums ====
- All This Way (Philips, 1981)
- You're In The Pocket (Ultraphone, 1983)
- Red Light (Striped Horse, 1986)
- Een vrolijk kerstfeest (Tip Top TTC, 1995), a Christmas music compilation on which Patty Brard sings "It's Gonna Be A Cold Christmas" with Robert Halewijn
- Gouden Kerst (Megado, 1996), a re-issue of Een vrolijk kerstfeest
- Patty's Party Vol. 1 (NRGY Music, 2011)

==== Singles ====
- "Hold On To Love" (Philips, 1981)
- "Brazilian Love Song / Samba Man" (Philips, 1981)
- "You Stole a Little Piece of My Heart" (Ultraphone, 1983)
- "Never My Love" (Ultraphone, 1983)
- "Woman in Love" (Striped Horse, 1985)
- "Mystery Theme" (Striped Horse, 1985)
- "Over My Head" (Striped Horse, 1986)
- "Red Light" (Striped Horse, 1986)
- "Tender Love" (duet with Eddy Kendricks, Striped Horse, 1986)
- "Ik ga extreem" (Red Bullet, 1996)
- "BN'ers voor BNN: Hij gaat voor C" (Bunny Music Bucs, 1997)
- "Huilen is voor jou te laat" (duet with Jacques Herb, Telstar/CNR Music, 2004)
- "That's Life" (duet with Derick, Princess Records, 2005)
- "Ik wil knallen" (duet with Ome Henk, Princess Records, 2006)
- "Het leven is een feest" (NRGY Music, 2010)
- "Morgen Kan't Weer Anders Zijn" (NRGY Music, 2011)
- "Waarom zou drinken een zonde zijn" (NRGY Music, 2011)
- "Bunga Bunga" (NRGY Music, digital single, 2011)
- "Carnavals Party Hitmix" (duet with Alex, digital single, Berk Music, 2012)
- "Bonje Met De Buren" (with Joey Hartkamp and Jochem van Gelder, digital single, Goldstar Music, 2015)
- "Wat Zijn Ze Lekker" (with Roy Donders, digital single, Berk Music, 2017)
- "We Zullen De Laatsten Zijn" (duet with Roy Donders, digital single, Berk Music, 2018)
- "In M'n Panterpak" (digital single, Berk Music, 2022)
- "Panter Feest" (digital single, Goldstar Music, 2024)
- "Feesten in de stad" (duet with Kees de Bever, digital single, NRGY Music, 2024)

== TV career ==
Since 1983, Patty Brard has hosted numerous TV shows, including De Bananasplit Show, Gaan met die banaan, Brard gaat extreem, Onder de B van Brard, and Hart van de stad. In 1985, she presented with Pippo Baudo the Sanremo Music Festival on the Italian TV channel Rai Uno.

In early 2001, in her TV show Absolutely Patty on Yorin, she interviewed VIPs in her house. In that year, she also hosted the third Dutch edition of Big Brother.

Two years later, a reality TV programme Patty's Posse featured her domestic life, her friends and her family (her daughter Priscilla, and her third husband René). In the autumn of 2004, she was filmed with other celebrities (among them, her Luv' colleague Marga Scheide) as they were having a health cure in Ibiza.

On March 25, 2005, she celebrated her 50th birthday, which spawned a special TV programme Pat's Life (in which she met the most important persons in her life) was prepared. Later that year RTL 5 broadcast Lieve Patty, in which Brard helped desperate candidates to solve their love problems. In 2006, the docusoap Back in Luv' featured Luv's reunion.

Her funny performance in Sterren Dansen op het IJs (the Dutch version of Skating with Celebrities) in January 2007 was a heavily covered media event. After a 15-year-long partnership with RTL Nederland, she signed a contract with SBS6. She was involved in several programs:

- "Shownieuws" (an entertainment news show) she presented from February 2007 to May 2011.
- "De Nieuwe Uri Geller" (the Dutch version of paranormal talent contest "The Successor", which was high in the ratings in 2008–2009). She was a regular guest on the first season, co-hosted the second season with Tooske Ragas and the third edition with Beau van Erven Dorens. She was also part of a jury on the 2010 edition.
- "Wie Ben Ik?". She was a team captain on this game show with Gerard Joling (the 2008 season scored good ratings but the next edition lost half of its viewers).
- K2 zoekt K3, a talent show with Brard in the jury and whose aim was to search the new member of Flemish girl group K3.
- The second season of "Coming to Holland: Prins zoekt vrouw", the Dutch version of Undercover Princes aired between November 2010 and January 2011.

In addition to the presentation of her own shows, Brard has often been invited on successful TV shows, like (Mooi! Weer De Leeuw, Jensen! and Life & Cooking...).

In April 2011, Sanoma and Talpa took over SBS Nederland. One month later, Brard's deal was not extended. Soon after, RTL Nederland announced that Brard would appear in September 2011 on a reality program Diva's draaien door, with former rivals Patricia Paay and Tatjana Simic.

Her participation in Sterren Springen Op Zaterdag (also known as Celebrity Splash!) in 2012 boosted her career. January 2013 saw Patty's comeback on "Shownieuws". At that time, she worked as a freelance TV host for RTL 5 (on reality shows "Wie is de Reisleider?", "Echte Meisjes op de Prairie" and "Lust, Liefde Of Laten Lopen") and SBS6 (on "Shownieuws" and as a judge on the ski jumping competition "Vliegende Hollanders: Sterren van de Schans").

From late August 2013 to late August 2017, Patty had an exclusive contract with SBS6.

In addition to "Shownieuws", she was involved in other programs:

- Show Vandaag (2013-2014) - infotainment program
- Bonje Met de Buren (2014–2016) - a reality show hosted with Jochem van Gelder to solve problems between neighbours
- Patty's Big Fat Ibiza Wedding (2014) - a reality show which showed the preparations for her wedding with Dutch architect Antoine van de Vijver
- Mindmasters Live (2015) - paranormal show featuring Uri Geller and Patty as a panellist
- Thuis op Zondag (2016) - Sunday talk show
- Met de Deur in Huis (2016) - comedy panel game show hosted by Kees Tol and Tineke Schouten with Patty as a panellist
- De Wereld Rond In 6 Stappen (on SBS6's sister channel Net5, 2016) - reality program about the theory of "six degrees of separation" with Bridget Maasland
- Mud Masters VIP (2016) - challenging obstacle course based on military training with celebrities
- SBS Sterren Surprise (2016) - a Christmas program featuring TV personalities who fulfilled the dreams of people
- Stem van Nederland (2017) - a political program related to the general elections in the Netherlands

Between September 2017 and March 2019, Patty was freelancing again for several channels. In March 2019, she signed a 4-year deal with Talpa TV (which owns SBS6, Net5, SBS9 and Veronica).

She appeared on the following TV programs:

- 6 inside (2019) - infotainment program on SBS6
- Zo Goed Als Nieuw (2019) - repair show on SBS6
- The Dutch version of Dancing On Ice (2019-2020) - celebrity figure skating competition on SBS6
- Ladies Night (2019) - one episode of Net5's talk show
- Patty en Gordon op zoek naar de eeuwige jeudg (2020) - travel show with Gordon Heuckeroth

Moreover, due to the Covid-19 pandemic, the daily talk show she was supposed to co-host with Gordon was shelved.

In late August 2021, she started the filming of "De grote huisverbouwing", a home renovation show on SBS6. The first episode of this program was broadcast on October 24, 2021.

Her contract with Talpa was not renewed in March 2023. However, Patty Brard remains a freelancer on SBS6's infotainment news program "Shownieuws" and appears as a candidate and guest panelist on several game shows.

=== TV shows ===
As the main host:

- Gaan met die banaan (RTL Véronique, 1989–1990)
- Hart van de stad (RTL 4, 1995)
- Brard gaat extreem (RTL 5, 1995)
- Onder de B van Brard (RTL 5, 1996)
- Brard gaat extreem (Veronica, 1997–1998)
- Brard (Veronica, 1997–1998)
- Veronica Goes Gay (Veronica, 1998)
- Patty (Veronica, 1999)
- Patty gaat extreem (Veronica, 1999)
- Absolutely Patty (Veronica, 2000–2001)
- Big Brother 3: "The Battle" (Yorin, 2001)
- Patty's Posse (Yorin, 2003–2004)
- Patty's Fort (Yorin, 2004)
- Pat's Life (Yorin, 2005)
- Lieve Patty (RTL 5, 2005)
- Coming to Holland: Prins zoekt vrouw (SBS6, 2010–2011)
- Echte Meisjes op de Prairie (RTL 5, 2013)
- Lust, Liefde Of Laten Lopen (Dutch version of Snog Marry Avoid?) (RTL 5, 2013 – rerun in 2014)
- Patty's Big Fat Ibiza Wedding (SBS6, 2014)
- Dutch version of Hotter Than My Daughter (RTL 5 - 2019)
- Expeditie Schoonmoeder (TLC, 2019)
- Zo Goed Als Nieuw (SBS6, 2019)
- De grote huisverbouwing (SBS6, 2021-2022)

As a co-host, contestant, jury member, or panellist:

- De Bananasplit Show (TROS, 1983–1985) - co-host with Ralf Inbar
- Sanremo Music Festival (Rai Uno, 1985) - co-host with Pippo Baudo
- Bingo (BRT, 1986–1987) - co-host
- Back in Luv' (RTL 5 and vtm, 2006, rerun in 2009 on VTM) - reality show with Marga Scheide and José Hoebee about Luv's comeback
- Shownieuws (SBS6, 2007–2011, 2013–2017, 2019-present) - as a showbiz expert
- De Nieuwe Uri Geller (SBS6, 2008–2010) - as a regular guest on the first season, a co-host on the second season with Tooske Ragas and the third edition with Beau van Erven Dorens. She was also part of a jury on the 2010 edition.
- Wie Ben IK? (SBS6, 2008–2009) - as a team captain with Gerard Joling
- Ranking the Stars (BNN/NPO 3, 2008, 2013–2018, 2025) - as a panelist
- K2 zoekt K3 (SBS6 and vtm, 2009) - member of the jury
- Diva's draaien door (RTL 4, 2011 – rerun in 2013) - reality show with Patricia Paay and Tatjana Simic
- Sterren Springen Op Zaterdag (also known as Celebrity Splash!) (SBS6, 2012) - as a contestant
- Wie is de Reisleider? (RTL 5, 2013) - as a celebrity tourist
- Vliegende Hollanders: Sterren van de Schans (SBS6, 2013) - member of the jury
- Koffietijd (RTL 4, 2013) - as a replacement for Quinty Trustfull; co-host with Loretta Schrijver
- Show Vandaag (SBS6, 2013–2014) - as an entertainment expert
- Bonje Met de Buren (SBS6, 2014–2017) - as a co-host with Jochem van Gelder
- Mindmasters Live (SBS6, 2015) - as a member of the jury
- Thuis op Zondag (SBS6, 2016) - as a co-host with Kim-Lian van der Meij
- Met de Deur in Huis (Dutch version of Through the Keyhole) (SBS6, 2016) - member of the panel
- Vier Handen Op Een Buik (BNN, 2016-2018, 2021) - as a female celebrity supporting teen mothers
- De Wereld Rond in 6 Stappen (Net5, 2016) - with Bridget Maasland
- RTL Late Night met Twan Huys (featuring the entertainment news section "De Week van Patty", RTL 4, 2018-2019)
- Brard & Jekel: VetGelukkig?! (NPO 3, 2018) - co-host with Diederik Jekel
- Het Perfecte Plaatje (RTL 4, 2018) - as a contestant and winner of this celebrity photo contest
- 6 Inside (SBS6, 2019) - as a showbiz expert
- Dutch version of Dancing On Ice (SBS6, 2019) - as a co-host with Winston Gerschtanowitz
- Patty en Gordon op zoek naar de eeuwige jeudg (SBS6, 2020) - as a celebrity tourist with Gordon Heuckeroth
- 5 Uur Show (SBS6, 2020-2021) - as a regular guest
- De Dansmarathon (SBS6, 2021) - as a co-host with Jeroen van der Boom
- Stars on Stage (RTL 4, 2025) - as a candidate for five episodes
- Vals Spel (Videoland, 2025) - as a panellist
- De Bevers (season 6, RTL 5, 2026)

One-off appearances:

- 30 Minuten (VPRO, 1995)
- Pittige Tijden (RTL 4, 1997)
- Villa Felderhof (NCRV, 1997)
- De Nationale IQ Test (BNN, 2003)
- Katja Vs De Rest (BNN, 2006)
- Sterren Dansen Op Het Ijs (SBS6, 2007)
- Doe Maar Normaal (BNN, 2008)
- Waar is De Mol? (Veronica, 2010)
- Bananasplit (AVROTROS, 2010)
- Comedy Live (BNN, 2011)
- Ik Kom Bij Je Eten (RTL 4, 2011)
- Dr. Ellen (VARA, 2011)
- Lang Leven de TV! (TROS, 2011)
- Van der Vorst Ziet Sterren (RTL 4, 2011)
- De Dino Show (NTR/Nederland 3, 2012)
- Ik Hou Van Holland (RTL 4, 2011, 2014)
- De TV Kantine (RTL 4, 2012 and 2019)
- Home Is Where The Heart Is (RTL 4, 2012)
- Van Je Vrienden Moet Je Het Hebben (SBS6, 2012)
- De Lijf Show (SBS6, 2012 and 2015)
- De Jongens Tegen de Meisjes (SBS6, 2012)
- Wie Ben Ik? (SBS6, 2014 and 2019)
- Sterren Springen Op Zaterdag (SBS6, 2014)
- Alles Mag Op Vrijdag (RTL 4, 2014)
- Linda's Zomerweek (RTL 4, 2014)
- Zullen We Een Spelletje Doen? (SBS6, 2016)
- Celebrity Stand-Up (Comedy Central, 2016)
- Mud Masters VIP (SBS6, 2016)
- SBS Sterren Surprise(SBS6, 2016)
- Eigen Huis & Tuin (RTL 4, 2017)
- Stem van Nederland (SBS6, 2017)
- De Gevaarlijkste Wegen van de Wereld (BNN, 2017)
- Celebrity City Trip (RTL 5, 2017)
- Naar Bed Met Irene (SBS6, 2017)
- Chantal Blijft Slapen (RTL 4, 2017)
- Oh, Wat Een Jaar! (RTL 4, 2017)
- Buurman, Wat Doet U Nu? (Een, RTL 4, 2017-2018)
- Tattoo Trippers (Veronica, 2018)
- Een Goed Stel Hersens (RTL 4, 2018)
- The Roast of Johnny de Mol (Comedy Central, 2018)
- Wat goééééd! Het beste van Chateau Meiland (SBS6, 2019)
- Ladies Night - (Net5, 2019)
- Lingo VIPS (SBS6, 2020)
- Wie het laatst lacht (SBS6, 2020)
- Deze Quiz Is Voor Jou (SBS6, 2021)
- Herinneringen voor het leven - stop dementie (AVROTROS/NPO 1, 2021)
- The Wheel (SBS6, 2021)
- De Kist (EO/NPO 2, 2022)
- I Can See Your Voice (RTL 4, 2022)
- The Greatest Hits: met stip op 1 (Net5, 2022)
- Think Inside The Box (SBS6, 2022)
- The Masked Singer (RTL 4, 2022)
- Secret Duets (RTL 4, 2022)
- Lettrix (SBS6, 2023)
- Ik hou van Holland (SBS6, 2023)
- Oh, wat een jaar! (RTL 4, 2023 in the team Gerard Joling)
- Top 4000 Muziekquiz (SBS6, 2023)
- Chateau Meiland VIPS (SBS6, 2024)
- Rooijakkers over de vloer (RTL 4, 2024)
- DNA singers (RTL 4, 2024)
- Ons kent Ons (RTL 4, 2024, in the team Jamai Loman)
- Make Up Your Mind (RTL 4, 2024)
- That's My Jam (Omroep Zwart, 2024)
- Know Where To Hide: Wie niet weg is? (Prime Video, 2025)
- DREAM SCHOOL (NTR, 2025)
- Hart tegen hart (SBS6, 2025)
- Stars on Stage: Soldaat van Oranje (RTL 4, 2025)
- Scrooge Live (NPO 1, 2025)

=== Series ===
Brard's life was made into a television series. In February 2024, the drama series PATTY, about Brard's life, premiered on the streaming service Videoland. The series was directed by Will Koopman. Brard was played in the series by Eva van de Wijdeven and Holly Mae Brood, both in different stages of life.

== Career in other media ==
=== Radio ===
In 1996, Brard hosted Radio Romantica on Hitradio Veronica, in which she gave the listeners advice about their love problems. In 2003 and 2004, she worked on a weekend show on Noordzee FM.

=== Podcasts ===
In late 2022 and early 2023, she hosted a podcast series in six episodes, Patty’s levenslessen, with Audiohuis, featuring celebrity guests like Hans Klok and Richard Groenendijk to share life lessons and reflections.

In 2025, her podcast series Datecast featured singles in voice-only conversations to determine compatibility, concluding with a real-life date.

=== Playboy ===
In January 1988, Brard was the cover girl of one issue of the Dutch edition of Playboy.

=== Columnist and interviewer ===
In 2005 and 2006, she wrote a weekly column in Weekend (a Dutch gossip magazine) about her career and her point of view about show business. In August 2007, she was a temporary correspondent of Privé (a Dutch celebrity magazine) in which she writes another column about her holidays in Ibiza. She interviewed female stars for the glossy publication Beau Monde between 2008 and 2010. Between 2012 and 2019, she was a columnist again for Weekend.

=== Acting and dubbing ===
Brard appeared in Odyssée d'amour, a movie directed by Pim de la Parra in 1987 as well as in An Amsterdam Tale in 1999 and Costa! and the series based on it in 2001. She also played cameo roles in the TV series Pittige tijden (a parody of Goede tijden, slechte tijden in 1997) as well as in the films Spion van Oranje (2009) and Sinterklaas en de Pepernoten Chaos (2013).
Since 2010, Brard has been voicing characters for the Dutch versions of 3-D animated comedies and children's films: How to Train Your Dragon and Sammy's Adventures in 2010, Heksje Lilly en de reis naar Mandolan (the sequel of Lilly the Witch: The Dragon and the Magic Book) in 2011, Legends of Valhalla: Thor in 2012, Alvin and the Chipmunks: The Road Chip in 2015, The Emoji Movie in 2017 and Minions: The Rise of Gru in 2022.

=== Advertisements and TV commercials ===
- in the 1980s in a newspaper advertisement to promote Papillon/American Love romance novels
- in 1984 for the Coebergh Spirits
- in 2001 for the Sun tablets (dishwasher products)
- in 2003 in a newspaper advertisement for the Dutch subsidiary of Debitel, a mobile services provider
- in 2003 for the internet provider chello in which she played the role of an Idols contestant
- In 2003 and 2004 for Albert Heijn
- in 2006 for Media Markt
- in 2012 for De Meubelmarkt, a low-budget furniture retailer.

== Business ==
In the early 1990s, she had a fashion store in The Hague. In 2016, she launched her corrective underwear line named "Patty sexy correctie". In 2017, she intended to open a gift shop in Ibiza. Since February 2020, Patty Brard's products (including household items) have been available in Kruidvat shops in the Netherlands, as part of the "From PB with love" campaign. Patty Brard's deal with Kruidvat also permitted the launch of the jewellery line "Pritty" with her daughter Priscilla Nasi in 2022 and the skincare line "PB Beauty" in 2023.

== Books ==
A journalist, Pieter Ploeg wrote her biography (De Naakte Waarheid: The Naked Truth) which was published by Strengholt in 2003.

Dutch authors Michel van Egmond and Antoinnette Scheulderman wrote another biography entitled De Negen Levens van Patty Brard (The nine lives of Patty Brard) which came out the day of her 65th birthday on March 25, 2020.

On November 6, 2020, her first children's book "Bibi & Lulu – Het is Feest!" (inspired by her two dogs) came out.

== Personal life ==
=== Husbands ===
The Luv' singer got married four times:

- 1979–1980: Her first husband, Ron Brandsteder, is a TV presenter in the Netherlands.
- 1983–1988: The second, Carlo Nasi, is an Italian music producer who is an heir and descendant of Giovanni Agnelli, founder of the FIAT company. He's the father of Brard's daughter, Priscilla.
- 1999–2004: The third one, René Muthert, is a singer and a musician who appeared in Patty's Posse, one of her reality TV shows.
- Since September 2014, she is the spouse of architect Antoine van de Vijver.

=== Brard's bankruptcy in 1993 ===
Due to the flop of Hello/Brard (a magazine she had launched with Eric Peute and that focused on women's fashion, beauty, health and entertainment), Brard went bankrupt in December 1993. She was obliged to sell all her possessions. It took years to recover.
