= Herman Brood & His Wild Romance =

Dutch backing band for Herman Brood (1976–2001)

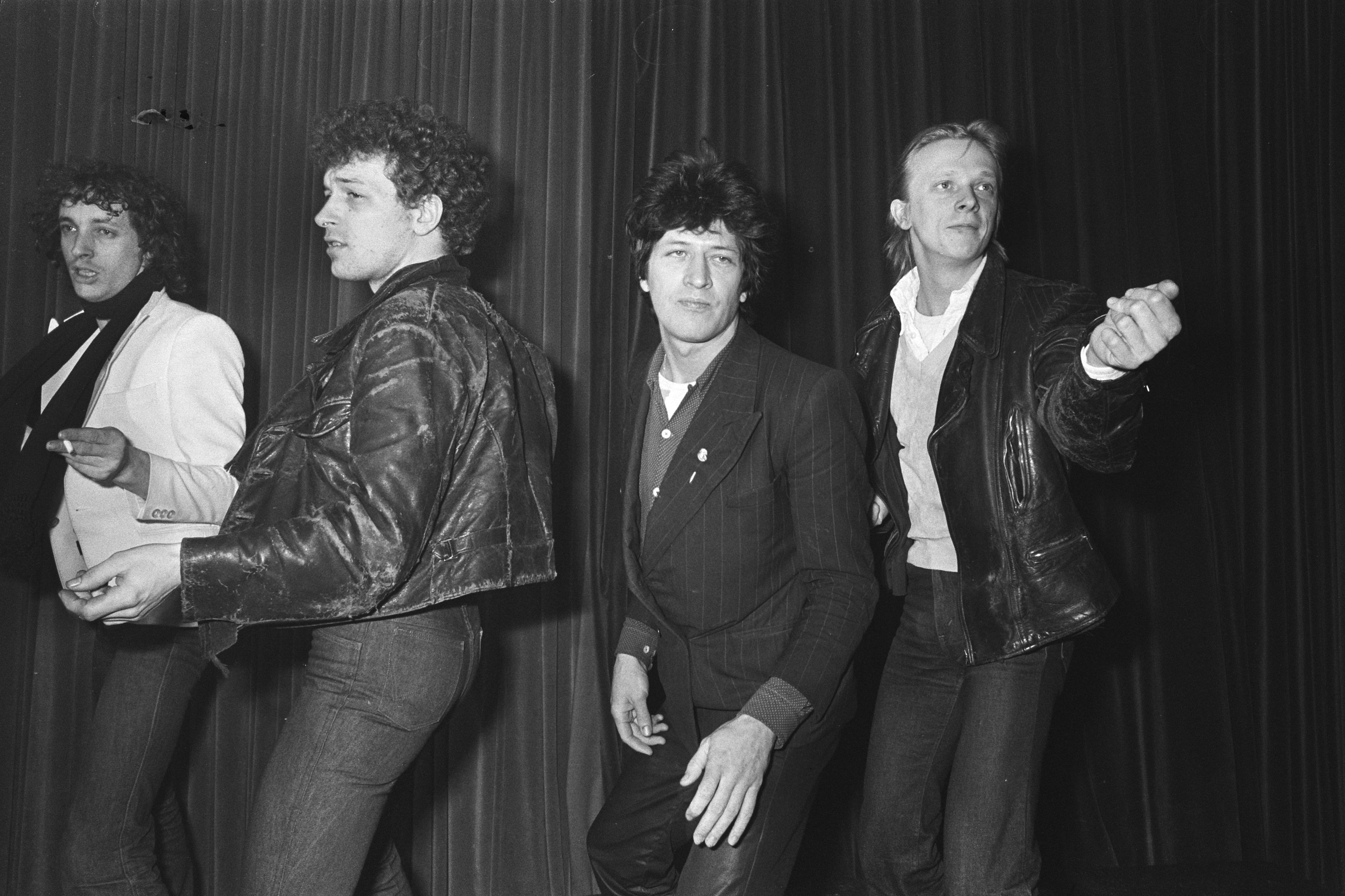
- L to R: Ani Meerman, Freddie Cavalli, Herman Brood and Dany Lademacher (1979)

Background information
- Years active: 1976 - 2001
- Labels: Bubble, Ariola, Sky, CBS, Columbia, BMG, Aves, Avon, Coach Music
- Past members: Herman Brood; Anna Dekkers (Dee Dee); Ferdi Karmelk; Dany Lademacher; Kees "Ani" Meerman; Ellen Piebes; Ria Ruiter; Monica Tjen-a-Kwoei; Gerrit Veen; Peter Walrech

Wild Romance, also known as The Wild Romance, but best known as Herman Brood & His Wild Romance was the backing band of Dutch singer-pianist Herman Brood.

While labeled as a new wave band, the director of Wild Romance's record label, Ariola, disputed this categorization when first promoting the band to the American audience in 1979, saying it came about "because he [Brood]'s a European artist".

== Background ==
The best known lineup of the band, which lasted between November 1977 and October 1979, was:

- Dany Lademacher — lead guitar
- Fred van Kampen ("Freddie Cavalli") — bass guitar
- Kees "Ani" Meerman — drums
- Monica Tjen-a-Kwoei and Anna Dekkers (Dee Dee), together known as The Bombita's - backing vocals

Following this a number of musicians, including Bertus Borgers on saxophone, joined, left and rejoined the band, however the success of the late 1970s was never repeated.

== Career ==
The band was formed in 1976 in Groningen and had various lineups. The band got its name from the lyric "...and I lost my mind in a wild romance" which they heard on the American jazz and blues singer, Mose Allison’s 1957 recording of the song Lost Mind, which was written by Percy Mayfield in 1951; both Brood and manager Koos van Dijk were fans of Allison.

The group's self-titled album was reviewed twice in the 9 April 1979 issue of RMR. The first was by Laurie Cobb of KTYD in Santa Barbara. Cobb began with telling the reader that if they were hard to please then Herman Brood would set their mood and mentioned the merits of selected tracks, finishing off with "People should hear Never Enough to live happily ever after". Rich Piombino of WKLS (96 Rock) in Atlanta. GA wasn't as enthusiastic and said that it had its good points and bad points. The record also debuted at no. 40 on the RMR album chart that week. The song "Saturday Night" also debuted at no. 48 on the RMR Top-50 Album Cuts chart. That week, the album was added to the playlists of KYYS-FM in Kansas City, KMOD-FM in Tulsa, WMMR-FM in Philadelphia, and KWST-FM in Los Angeles.

The band recorded their Go Nutz album which was produced by Tim O'Brien and released on Ariola OL1500 in 1980. A Recommended LP, it had a positive review in the 14 June 1980 issue of Billboard. With the reviewer pointing out that Brood had attracted attention the previous year with his US debut, the similarity between Bruce Springsteen and Graham Parker was noted. The r&b laced rock that Brood had on the album was done well. The remakes of "I'll Be Doggone" and "Beauty Is Only Skin Deep", both r&b standards were said to work well. The reviewer's picks were, "I Love You Like I Love Myself", "I'll Be Doggone" "Easy Pick Up", "Beauty Is Only Skin Deep", and "Born Before My Time".

== Band personnel ==
The major incarnations of the band were:-

=== Initial lineup ===
The first incarnation of the band was:

- Ferdi Karmelk, guitarist
- Gerrit Veen, bassist (left to join the Dutch band The Meteors)
- Peter Walrecht, drummer
- Ellen Piebes and Ria Ruiter, backing vocals

=== Shpritsz ===
In 1978, at around the time of the Shpritsz tour, the lineup was:

- Dany Lademacher, guitarist
- Freddie Cavalli, bass guitar
- Cees "Ani" Meerman, drummer
- Monica Tjen A Kwoei and Dee Dee Dekkers backing vocals

This incarnation of Herman Brood & his Wild Romance scored the hits "Saturday Night", "Still Believe" (with Bertus Borgers on saxophone), "Never Be Clever" and "I Love You Like I Love Myself". Albums Shpritsz and Cha Cha from 1978 were certified gold and platinum respectively, with the platinum disc for Cha Cha being presented to Brood by celebrity bank robber Aage Meinesz.

Meerman was replaced in October 1979 by Peter Walrecht. In 1981 Lademacher was replaced by Erwin Java, who was in turn replaced by David Hollestelle. In 1983 Renee Lopez joined the band as the new bassist.

=== Circa 1986 ===
1986 saw the return of Lademacher and the lineup at this time was:

- Dany Lademacher
- David Hollestelle, guitar
- Ruud Englebert, bassist
- Cees Meerman, Roy Bakker, drums

=== Last incarnation ===
The last incarnation of the band from 1993 to 2001 consisted of:

- David Hollestelle, guitarist
- Ivo Severijns, bassist
- Guzz Genser, drummer

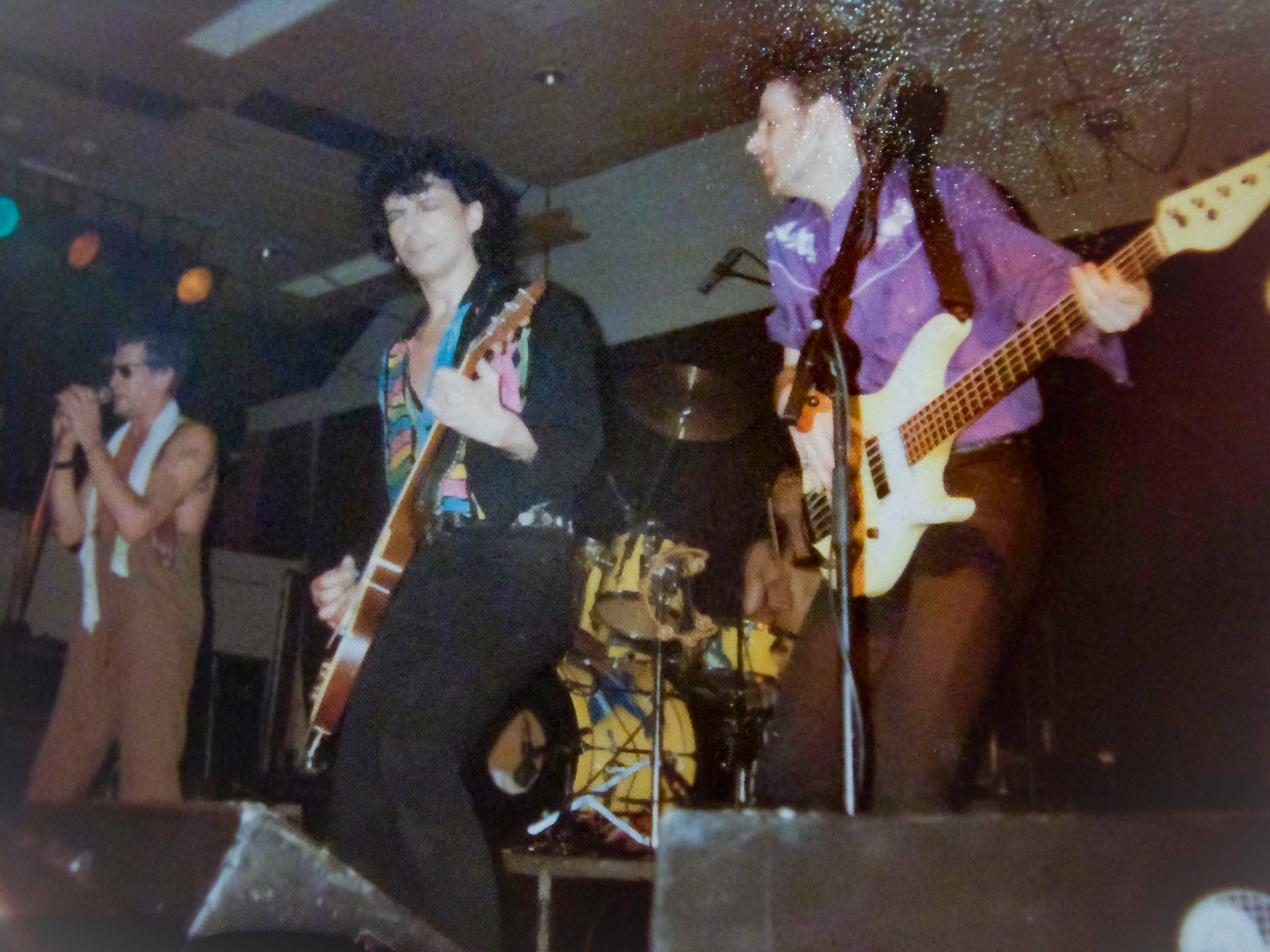
The band in 1997

== Related acts ==
In 1982 Cees "Ani" Meerman and Fred Van Kampen formed the band "The Managers".

In 2010 former band members, Dany Lademacher and Ruud Englebert, formed a band using the name "Lost in Romance", in mid-2011 this was simplified to just "The Romance". The lineup in 2010 was:

- Dany Lademacher, guitarist
- Jan Willem van Holland, guitarist
- Ruud Englebert, bassist
- Ronald van Beest performing as "Stick", vocals
- Ramon Rambeaux, drummer

== Discography ==
=== Albums ===
- Street (1977)
- Shpritsz (1978)
- Cha Cha (1978)
- Go Nutz (1980)
- Wait a Minute... (1980)
- Modern Times Revive (1981)
- Frisz & Sympatisz (1982)
- The Brood (1984)
- Bühnensucht/Live (1985)
- Yada Yada (1988)
- Hooks (1989)
- Freeze (1990)
- Saturday Night Live! (1992)
- Fresh Poison (1994)
- Back on the Corner (1999)
- Ciao Monkey (2000)
- The Final (2006)
- Kidstuff (2006)

=== DVDs ===
DVDs Chart position in the Dutch DVD Top 30	Year	Charted	Highest chart position	Total number of weeks	Notes
Live at Rockpalast 1978 + 1990	2012	May 4, 2012	15	5	with Herman Brood
