= Wild Romance (film) =

- Theatrical release poster
- Directed by: Jean van de Velde
- Written by: Maarten Lebens; Jean van de Velde
- Produced by: Bob Hubar; Denis Wigman
- Starring: Daniël Boissevain; Marcel Hensema
- Cinematography: Jules van den Steenhoven
- Edited by: Martyn Gould
- Music by: Dany Lademacher
- Distributed by: Independent Films
- Release date: 9 November 2006
- Running time: 103 minutes
- Country: Netherlands
- Languages: Dutch; German; English
- Budget: approx. €3 million

Wild Romance is a 2006 Dutch biopic about Dutch singer and artist Herman Brood. It follows the previous films depicting Brood, the 1979 feature film Cha Cha and the 1994 documentary Rock n Roll Junkie. Named for Brood's backing band, the film received its premiere on the day that Brood would have turned 60 on November 5, 2006.

The film deals with the early period of Brood's music career up to the period of success with the album Shpritsz, and Shpritsz was to have been the title of the film. In particular the film deals with Brood's relationships with manager Koos van Dijk, his band Wild Romance and German singer Nina Hagen with whom Brood was romantically involved.

== Plot ==
The film opens in 2001, Herman Brood, having written his suicide note, on the roof of the Hilton Hotel. As he prepares to jump, the film flashbacks thirty years prior to when Herman achieved great success as a singer (1974–1979). In 1976, Brood is evicted from the band Cuby + Blizzards, the penniless and drug dependent Brood nonetheless manages to find gigs in the Groningen bar scene. When he plays his bar, Brood attracts the attention of Winschoten bar owner Koos van Dijk, who becomes his manager. Under the inspirational leadership of van Dijk, Brood puts together a band he calls Herman Brood & His Wild Romance. Playing venues at home and abroad Brood and his band eventually find success especially with their album Shpritsz, and the hit single "Saturday Night". Dreaming of global success, they embark on a tour of the United States.

== Cast ==
- Daniël Boissevain as Herman Brood
- Marcel Hensema as Koos van Dijk
- Karina Smulders as Nina Hagen
- Joke Tjalsma as mother of Herman
- Maarten Rischen as Dany Lademacher
- Helge Slikker as Freddie Cavalli
- Joop Bonekamp as Cees Meerman
- Andy Nyman as Leo Leitner

== Accolades ==
- Rembrandt Award for Best Dutch Actor - Daniël Boissevain
- Golden Calf for best actor - Marcel Hensema
- Gouden Uien 2007 for the biggest box office flop of the year
