= Herman Brood & His Wild Romance (album) =

Compilation album by Herman Brood & His Wild Romance
- Released: 1979
- Genre: Rock and roll, blues
- Label: Ariola
- Producer: Herman Brood & His Wild Romance

Herman Brood & His Wild Romance chronology
Cha Cha (1978)	Herman Brood & His Wild Romance (1979)	Go Nutz (1980)

Professional ratings
Review scores
Source	Rating
Allmusic	4/5 stars

Herman Brood & His Wild Romance is an export album by Dutch rock and roll and blues group Herman Brood & His Wild Romance. Released only in the United States, it contained most of the songs from his second studio album, Shpritsz. The main differences between the two albums were omission of the song "One", slightly modified times and track order, and the U.S. single version of "Saturday Night" which features different lyrics from the original version. Some versions of the LP contained the entire 5:07 minute version of "Saturday Night." The album was a moderate success, reaching #122 on the Billboard chart for pop albums. As a result, Brood sought to open up the American market, recording the follow-up, Go Nutz, in the US.

== Track listing ==
No.	Title	Length
1.	"Saturday Night" (Brood, Lademacher)	3:42 (5:07)
2.	"Doin' It" (Brood)	2:39
3.	"Champagne (& Wine)" (Johnson, Otis Redding, Walder)	3:31
4.	"Back (In Y'r Love)" (Brood, Hawinkels)	1:48
5.	"Doreen" (Brood, Lademacher, Langenbach)	2:32
6.	"Hit" (Brood, Hawinkels, Lademacher)	2:47
7.	"Rock & Roll Junkie" (Brood)	2:46
8.	"Dope Sucks" (Brood, Lademacher)	2:06
9.	"Never Enough" (Boonstra, Brood, Sinszheimer, Strack)	2:31
10.	"Pain" (Boonstra, Brood)	1:52
11.	"Get Lost" (Brood)	3:12
12.	"Hot-Talk" (Sinszheimer, Strack)	1:44
13.	"Prisoners" (Brood, Hawinkels)	1:40
14.	"Skid Row" (Brood, Hawinkels, Veen)	2:35

== Personnel ==
- Herman Brood - piano, keyboard, vocals
- Freddy Cavalli - bass
- Danny Lademacher - guitar
- Cees Meerman - drums
- Peter Walrecht - voormalig drummer
