= Unknown Brood =

- Theatrical release poster
- Directed by: Dennis Alink
- Produced by: Nelsje Musch-Elzinga, Dan Blazer, Gideon Levy & Dennis Alink
- Cinematography: Thomas van der Gronde
- Edited by: Bobbie Roelofs
- Release date: 19 November 2016 (IDFA)
- Running time: 85 minutes
- Country: Netherlands

Unknown Brood is a Dutch documentary, directed by Dennis Alink. The film depicts the life of painter and rock-'n-roll musician Herman Brood and premiered at the IDFA in Amsterdam. The film was nominated for Best Dutch Documentary and has been released in cinemas by distributor Amstel Film.

== Synopsis ==
On 11 July 2001, Herman Brood commits suicide by jumping off the roof of the Hilton hotel. In his personal videos, song lyrics and interviews Brood has left a trail of breadcrumbs pertaining to the questions his death has given rise to. The documentary takes a look back to re-experience these important moments with the help of these never-before-seen footages and the people that stood closest to him.

== Production ==
The filmmakers started this project without any budget and it took them four years to make. Before shooting began cinematographer Thomas van der Gronde and director Dennis Alink experimented with a new documentary-approach by writing a 50-page script and a graphic film-plan in which archive and new to shoot scenes would fuse. This way the locations and lighting of interviews would change and develop every other scene to complement the state of mind of Herman Brood. Eventually a small budget was raised through crowdfunding and after the film was edited the Netherlands Film Fund and KPN stepped in so the film could be completed.

== Seen in the film ==
- Herman Brood
- Frank Black
- Nina Hagen
- Anton Corbijn
- Henny Vrienten
- Jules Deelder
- Dany Lademacher
