= Carina Lemoine =

Dutch pop female singer

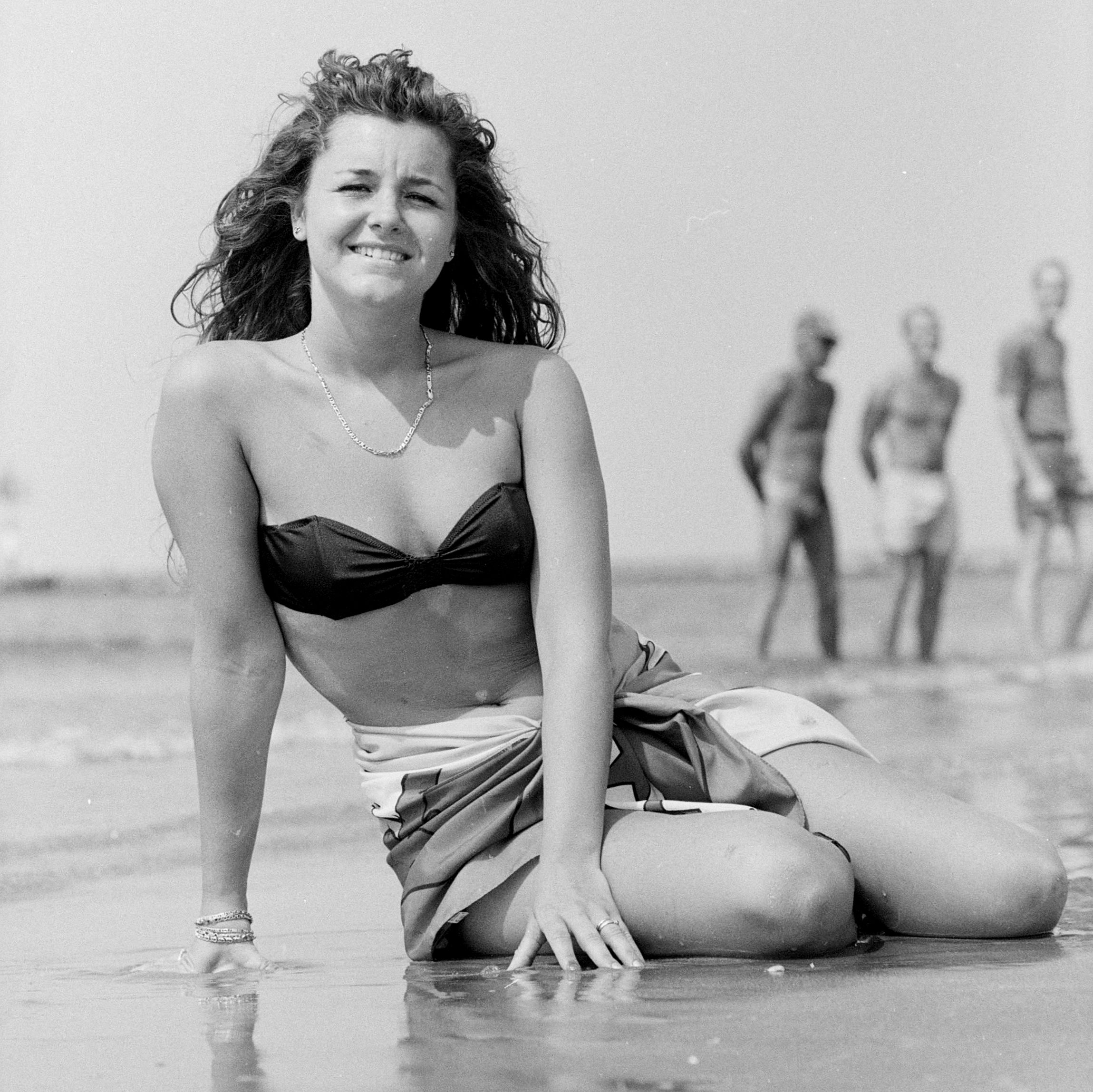
- Carina Lemoine, IJmuiden beach 1991

Background information
- Born: 1969 (age 56–57); Velsen, Netherlands
- Origin: Netherlands
- Genres: Pop
- Occupation: Singer
- Instrument: Singing
- Years active: 1977–present
- Label: RCA/BMG
- Website: www.carina-zangeres.nl

Carina Lemoine (born 1969, Helmond, Netherlands) is a Dutch pop female singer. She was a member of the girl group Luv' from 1990 to 1992. She scored with the female formation a minor hit song: He's My Guy. After Luv' disbanded in 1992, she formed with Diana van Berlo the short-lived girl duo Lady's D.C. She later went solo.

== Early years ==
Carina started her career as a singer when she was eight years old. She was discovered by the producers of BZN and Saskia & Serge. As a teenager, she recorded some singles: "I love disco" (at age 12), "O lieve pappa" (at age 13), "Mama hij wilt zo graag een zoen" (at age 15) and "The hour comes nigh" (when she was 17). In the meantime, she did many live performances.

== Luv' (1990–1992) ==
In 1990, she took part in an audition among hundred girls in the famous Wisseloord Studios in Hilversum to be chosen as Michelle Gold's replacement to be part of Luv'. She was recruited and recorded the single "Hasta Mañana", followed by the album Sincerely Yours in early 1991. She performed with Luv' not only in the Netherlands but also in Belgium, in Germany, in Sweden and in Dubai (where the ladies entertained Dutch soldiers who participated in the coalition during the First Gulf War).

In late 1992, Luv' disbanded. The original line-up of the pop trio (featuring Patty Brard, Marga Scheide and José Hoebee) reunited in the spring of 1993 and in 2005.

== Later career ==
After Luv'', she formed a duo with Diana van Berlo: Lady's D.C. The two singers recorded in 1994 a single ("Now is the Time") released by RCA/BMG. Soon after, they ended their professional relationship. In 2004, she was one of the candidates of a talent show, Een ster in 40 dagen (A star in 40 days), broadcast on TROS TV channel. Then, she did solo live shows in bars and music events. She recorded a single ("Valentino") released in 2006. On 14 June 2009 Hans Klok hosted Lemoine's party for the release of her CD Dans Met Mij.

== Discography ==
Singles with Luv'

- "Hasta Mañana" (RCA Records/BMG, 1990)
- "Jungle Jive" (RCA Records/BMG, 1991)
- "He's My Guy" (RCA Records/BMG, 1991)
- "The Last Song" (RCA Records/BMG, 1991)
- "This Old Heart of Mine (Is Weak for You)" (JAM, 1992)

Album with Luv'

- Sincerely Yours (RCA Records/BMG, 1991)

Single with Lady's D.C

- "Now is the Time" (RCA/BMG, 1994)

Solo singles

- "I love disco" (1981)
- "O lieve pappa" (1983)
- "Mama hij wilt zo graag een zoen" (1984)
- "The hour comes nigh" (1986)
- "Valentino" (2006)

Solo album

- Dans Met Mij (2009)
