= Nina Hagen filmography =

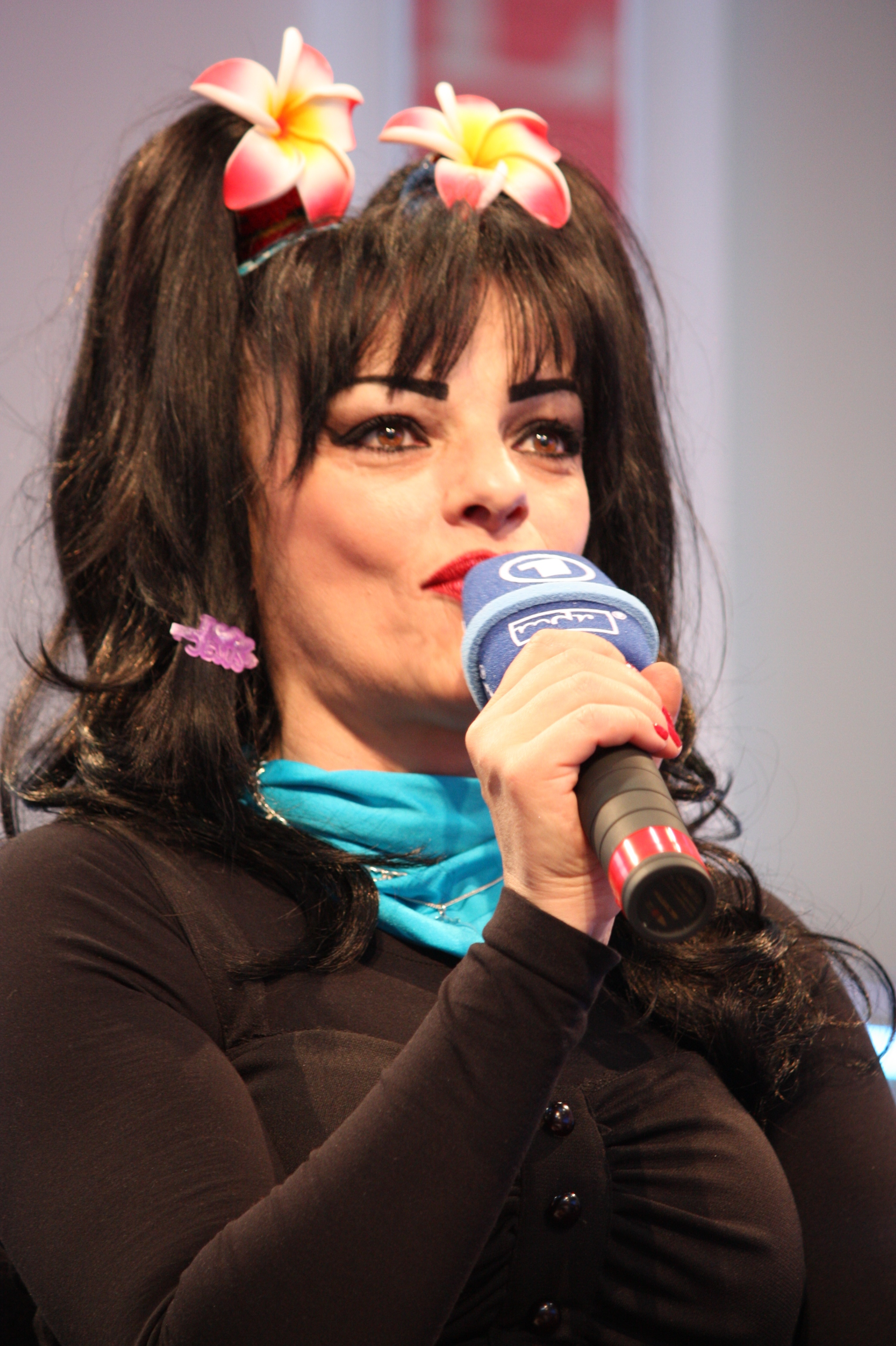
Hagen at the Leipzig Book Fair, March 2010

Nina Hagen is a German singer, songwriter and actress. She made her acting debut on the German television series ABC der Liebe in 1974. Subsequently, she appeared in a number of films produced in former East Germany, such as Heiraten weiblich (1975), Heute ist Freitag (1975), Liebesfallen (1976), and Unser stiller Mann (1976). In those film she often appeared alongside her mother and actress Eva-Maria Hagen.

Following her 1976 expatriation from East Germany, Hagen moved to Hamburg when she was invited by independent filmmaker and photographer Juliana Grigorova to travel to London and appear in her short film The Go-Blue Girl (1978). She followed with the role in the Dutch film Cha Cha (1979), in which she appeared alongside Herman Brood and Lene Lovich.

== Feature films ==
Year	Title	Role	Notes	Ref.
1976	Liebesfallen	Liane Brückner		
1976	Unser stiller Mann	Regina		
1979	Ticket of No Return	Singer in taxi	German title: Bildnis einer Trinkerin	
1979	Cha Cha	Nina		
1983	Pankow '95	Jungfrau Maria		
1988	Dandy			
1993	The Nightmare Before Christmas	Sally	Voice. German title: Der Albtraum vor Weihnachten	
1994	Thumbelina	Mama Toad	Voice. German title: Däumeline	
1996	Lilien in der Bank	Suzanne		
1998	Rudolph the Red-Nosed Reindeer	Stormella	Voice. German title: Rudolph mit der Roten Nase	
1999	Nina Hagen = Punk + Glory	Herself		
1999	Hot Dogs: Wau - wir sind reich!	Emmo	Voice	
2000	Vasilisa	Witch		
2003	Spirited Away	Yubaba	Voice. German title: Chihiros Reise Ins Zauberland	
2004	La prophétie des grenouilles	Evil Turtle	Voice. German title: Das Geheimnis Der Frösche	
2004	7 Dwarves – Men Alone in the Wood	Böse Königin	German title: 7 Zwerge – Männer allein im Wald	
2004	Villa Henriette	Voice of the House	Voice	
2006	7 Dwarves: The Forest Is Not Enough	Hexe	German title: 7 Zwerge – Der Wald ist nicht genug	
2014	The Seventh Dwarf	Eisfee Dellamorta	Voice. German title: Der 7bte Zwerg	
2014	Maya the Bee	Gunilla	Voice. German title: Die Biene Maja – Der Kinofilm	
2015	Desire Will Set You Free	Oracle		
2016	Gutterdämmerung			

== Television ==
Year	Title	Role	Network	Notes	Ref.
1974	ABC der Liebe	Tochter		Episode "Die gute Bewirtung"	
1975	Heiraten weiblich	Hannelore Pohl		Television film	
1975	Heute ist Freitag	Jutta		Television film	
2005	Wilde Engel	Umberta	RTL	Episode "Catwalk"	

== Short films ==
Year	Title	Role	Ref.
1978	The Go-Blue Girl		
