= Vitesse (band) =

Dutch rock group

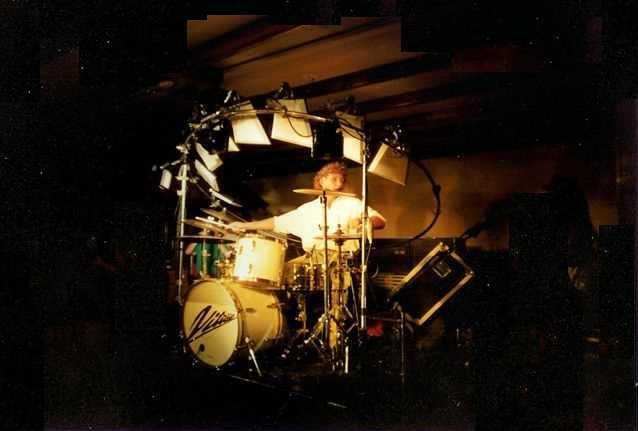
- Singer/drummer Herman van Boeyen

Background information
- Genres: Rock
- Years active: 1975–1994
- Past members: Herman van Boeyen (1975 -1994); Herman Brood (1975 - 1976); Rob ten Bokum (1975 - 1976); Peter Smid (1975 - ?); Ferdi Karmelk (1975 - ?); Paul Bagmeyer (1975 - ?); Rob van Donselaar (1975 - ?); Jan-Piet den Tex (1976 - ?); Gerrit Veen (1976); Ross Recardi (1976); Jaap van Eik (1976 - ?); Jan van der Meij(1977 - 1980); Wilco Toerroe Leerdam (1977 - 1979); Rudy de Queljoe (1977 - 1979); Peter van Straten (1979 - 1980); Mark Boon (1980 - ?); Freddie Cavalli (1980 - ?); Peter Langerak (1981 - 1982); André Versluijs (1981 - 1982); Otto Cooymans (1982 - 1983); Ruud Englebert (1982 - 1983); Carl Carlton (1982 - 1983); Danny Lademacher (1983 - ?); Michel Legrand (1983 - ?); Kai Kalastikow (1990? - ?); Mario Timme (1990? - ?); Guido Ludwig (1990? - ?); Marcus Wienstroer (1991 - ?)

Vitesse was a Dutch rock group founded by drummer and singer Herman van Boeyen, assisted by an assortment of other musicians including Herman Brood. The band was active from 1975 to 1994 and had a number of hit singles in the early 1980s. It built a reputation as a good live act.

== History ==
Vitesse (French: [vi.tɛs], lit. 'speed') was founded in 1975 in Amsterdam by Herman van Boeyen, with Herman Brood (vocals and piano), Rob ten Bokum (guitar), and Peter Smid (bass). They signed with Reprise that same year and released an untitled debut album. At that time the band consisted of Van Boeyen, Brood, Jan-Piet den Tex, Gerrit Veen, and Ross Recardi; Brood left the band shortly thereafter and took Veen with him.

A second album, Rendez Vous (Negram, 1977), was commercially unsuccessful, as was the third, Out in the Country (Negram, 1978), though it received positive reviews. Rock Invader (Negram, 1979) was more successful, with two charting singles: "Rock & Roll Band" and "Whole lot of Travellin'". The band was more successful in Germany. (These three Negram albums were re-released by EMI in 2007.)

After Herman Brood's Wild Romance dissolved, Van Boeyen tried again to collaborate with Brood, but this was not a success; this time Brood took bass player Peter van Straten with him when he left, though Van Straten returned a few days later. in 1980 the band released the album Live as a trio: Van Boeyen, Van Straten, and Jan van der Meij. The latter two left soon and founded Powerplay.

Vitesse finally began scoring hits in 1982, with a line-up that included Otto Cooymans, Ruud Englebert, and Carl Carlton. The singles "Rosalyn" and "Good lookin'" received significant attention, and the albums Live in Germany and Incomplete Works & Other Hits reached #19 and #15 on the album charts. The single "Julia" was #30 in 1983, but after a dispute with Van Boeyen Cooymans left the band, and took Englebert and Carlton with him. The next album, Vanity Island, and the single of the same name were flops and after another failed album the band lost its record contract (with Philips).

In subsequent years Van Boeyen kept trying, but without avail. He had moved to Germany, playing mostly with German musicians. The 1990 single "Ever since I met you" was a moderate success in Germany, but not in the Netherlands. In 1994, after the single "All of the time" was a flop, Van Boeyen dissolved the band.

== Discography ==
=== Albums ===
Album title	Release date	Charting in the Dutch Album Top 100			Comments
Album title	Release date	Date of entry	Highest	Weeks	Comments
Vitesse	1975	-			
Rendez-vous	1977	-			
Herman Brood in Vitesse	1978	-			Reissue of the first album
Out in the country	1978	-			
Rock invader	1979	10-11-1979	29	6	
Live	1980	-			Live album
Good news	1981	-			
Live in Germany	1982	11-09-1982	19	14	Live album
Incomplete Works and Other Hits (You Always Never Knew You Would Like to Know Already About With)	1982	18-12-1982	15	10	Anthology
Vanity islands	1984	-			
Het beste van	1985	-			Anthology
Keepin' me alive	1985	-			
The best	1988	-			Anthology
Back on earth	1992	-			
Best of Vitesse	1997	-			Anthology
Good lookin	1999	-			Antholoty

=== Singles ===
Single title	Release date	Charting in the Dutch Top 40			Comments
Single title	Release date	Date of entry	Highest	Weeks	Comments
"April wind"	1976	-			
"Do you wanna dance"	1976	-			
"You can't beat me"	1977	21-05-1977	tip16	-	
"Out in the country"	1978	-			
"We'll do the music tonight"	1978	-			
"Rock and roll band"	1979	06-10-1979	29	4	No. 36 in the Single Top 100
"On the run"	1979	15-12-1979	tip18	-	
"Running and hiding"	1979	-			
"Goin' up"	1980	-			
"Whole lot of travellin"'	1980	23-02-1980	tip17	-	
"Can't keep a promise"	1981	-			
"Desire"	1981	-			
"Generator of love"	1981	-			
"Rosalyn"	1982	21-08-1982	9	7	No. 16 in the Single Top 100
"Good lookin"'	1982	13-11-1982	4	9	No. 4 in the Single Top 100
"All my heart"	1983	-			
"Julia"	1983	14-05-1983	30	3	No. 30 in the Single Top 100
"Transit lover"	1983	-			
"Highway love"	1984	-			
"Keep up"	1984	-			
"Vanity islands"	1984	07-07-1984	tip11	-	
"Keepin' me alive"	1985	-			
"Lights in the air"	1985	-			
"Spanish heat"	1985	-			
"You turn me on"	1985	-			
"A dirty mind is a joy forever"	1986	-			
"I don't lose a friend"	1987	-			
"Room to move"	1987	-			
"The risin' yen"	1988	-			
"Dancin"'	1989	-			
"Ever since I met you"	1990	-			
"Happy"	1992	-			
"What kind of man"	1993	-			No. 88 in the Single Top 100
"Mrs. Everlast"	1993	-			
"All of the time"	1994	-			
