= Cha Cha (album) =

Live album by Herman Brood & His Wild Romance
- Released: 1978
- Recorded: Relight Cafe, the Pinge à Linge, the Pedo Ville & the Too Far Gone Discotheque
- Genre: Rock and roll, blues
- Label: Ariola
- Producer: Herman Brood & His Wild Romance

Herman Brood & His Wild Romance chronology
Shpritsz (1978)	Cha Cha (1978)	Herman Brood & His Wild Romance (1979)

Singles from Cha Cha
- 1. "Still Believe" Released: 1978

Cha Cha is the first live album by Dutch rock and roll and blues group Herman Brood & His Wild Romance. The album produced one single, "Still Believe." On the Dutch album chart, the album reached #2 on 13 January 1979, and stayed on the chart for 18 weeks. The album was certified gold in 1979.

Cha Cha is also the name of a movie filmed in 1979 with Herman Brood, Nina Hagen, and Lene Lovich, whose soundtrack was released separately on LP, also called Cha Cha. In the movie, he marries Nina Hagen; in reality they had a brief affair.

Cha Cha was re-released on CD in 1991 by Sony BMG/Ariola.

== Track listing ==
All tracks composed by Herman Brood; except where noted.

No.	Title	Writer(s)	Length
1.	"Hit"	Brood, Pé Hawinkels, Dany Lademacher	1:34
2.	"Too Slow"	Brood, Dany Lademacher	2:27
3.	"Street"		2:10
4.	"Still Believe"	Bertus Borgers, Paul Smeenk	3:10
5.	"True Fine Mama"	Richard Penniman	1:50
6.	"Rock & Roll Junkie"		2:30
7.	"One More Dose"	Brood, Hugo Sinzheimer	3:40
8.	"Speedo"	The Cadillacs	0:30
9.	"Dope Sucks"	Brood, Dany Lademacher	2:40
10.	"City"	Mose Allison	3:40
11.	"Blue"		3:22
12.	"Can't Stand It"	Lou Reed	2:08
13.	"Phony"		3:20
14.	"Pop"		3:40

== Singles ==
The single "Still Believe" (with "Jilted" on the B-side) reached #15 in the Dutch Top 50 on 30 December 1978, and stayed on the chart for ten weeks. The single draws interest in Germany and France also.

== Personnel ==
- Herman Brood - piano, keyboard, vocals
- Monica Tjen Akwoei - vocals
- Bertus Borgers - saxophone
- Freddy Cavalli - bass
- Josee van Iersel - vocals
- Danny Lademacher - guitar
- Cees Meerman - drums
- Robin Freeman - sound engineer
- Anton Corbijn - photography
