= Modern Times Revive =

Studio album by Herman Brood & His Wild Romance
- Released: 1981
- Genre: Rock and roll, blues
- Label: Ariola
- Producer: Rinus Gerritsen

Herman Brood & His Wild Romance chronology
Wait a Minute (1980)	Modern Times Revive (1981)	Frisz & Sympatisz (1982)

Modern Times Revive is the fifth studio album by Dutch rock and roll and blues group Herman Brood & His Wild Romance. The Wild Romance fell apart after Go Nutz and Wait a Minute; the "new" Wild Romance featured David Hollestelle on guitar. The album was produced by Rinus Gerritsen of Golden Earring.

The album was re-released on CD in 1995 by Sony BMG/Ariola.

== Track listing ==
No.	Title	Length
1.	"Bad Blood"	4:06
2.	"Too Much Grace"	4:09
3.	"Little Girls"	2:53
4.	"White"	3:32
5.	"Jivin' (Myself)"	3:13
6.	"(No More) Dancin' in the Street"	2:50
7.	"Checkin' Out"	3:00
8.	"Proud"	3:11
9.	"Zockebeye Time"	2:48
10.	"Buried Alive"	3:11
11.	"Lies"	4:34

== Personnel ==
- Herman Brood – piano, keyboards, vocals
- Bertus Borgers – saxophone
- Freddy Cavalli – bass
- David Hollestelle – guitar
- Anthony Del Monte Lyon – drums
- Dee Dee – vocals
- Bert Hansen – harmonica
- George Kooymans – guitar
- Dany Lademacher – guitar
- Wally Langdon – bass
- Gino Vain – bass
- Rinus Gerritsen – producer
