= Cha Cha (soundtrack) =

Soundtrack album by Herman Brood, Nina Hagen and Lene Lovich
- Released: 1979
- Genre: Rock and roll; blues; punk; new wave
- Label: Ariola; CBS

Cha Cha is the soundtrack to the 1979 Dutch film Cha Cha, written by Herman Brood and directed by Herbert Curiel. It features songs by Herman Brood and his band The Wild Romance, Nina Hagen, Lene Lovich, Les Chappell, and others.

Upon its release, the soundtrack received positive reviews and was a commercial success in Netherlands where it peaked at number twenty-eight and was certified platinum by NVPI. The single "Never Be Clever" by Herman Brood & His Wild Romance was also successful in Dutch charts peaking at number ten.

== Track listing ==
No.	Title	Length
1.	"Love You Like I Love Myself"	3:01
2.	"Home"	3:42
3.	"Pick Up"	2:53
4.	"Sweet Memories"	2:44
5.	"Take It All In"	3:18
6.	"Fit"	2:12
7.	"Herman's Door"	3:09
8.	"Two Together"	2:02
9.	"Blues"	1:50
10.	"Doin' It"	3:04
11.	"It's You (Smersz)"	4:41
12.	"Beat"	2:43
13.	"(No More) Conversation"	2:20
14.	"Bop"	1:33
15.	"Herman ist High"	2:57
16.	"Jilted"	2:22
17.	"Don't Wanna Loose"	3:43
18.	"(For Elvis) Never Be Clever"	4:01
19.	"Blues"	1:03

== Charts ==
Chart (1979)	Peak position
Dutch Albums (Album Top 100)	28

== Certifications and sales ==
Region	Certification	Certified units/sales
Netherlands (NVPI)	Platinum	100,000^{^}
^{^} Shipments figures based on certification alone.
