= Sincerely Yours (Luv' album) =

Studio album by Luv'
- Released: April 1991
- Recorded: 1990–1991
- Genre: Pop; dance
- Length: 40:47
- Label: RCA/BMG
- Producer: Jacques Zwart (a.k.a. E. Mergency)

Luv' chronology
Greatest Hits (1990)	Sincerely Yours (1991)	Luv' Gold (1993)

Sincerely Yours is the fifth studio album by Dutch girl group Luv', released in 1991 by the labels RCA Records/BMG. It includes the singles "Hasta Mañana", "Jungle Jive", "He's My Guy" (a minor hit song) and "The Last Song". This opus features a new group's member Carina Lemoine who replaced Michelle Gold.

== Background ==
June 1990 saw changes in Luv's line-up. Michelle Gold was replaced by Carina Lemoine, a 20-year-old singer who had been recruited among a hundred girls by Marga Scheide (the only original group's member). This change in the trio's formation coincided with a new record deal. Luv' signed a contract with the Dutch subsidiary of RCA Records/BMG and chose another kind of repertoire. After the moderate success of the 1989 single "Welcome to My Party" (inspired by the Stock Aitken Waterman style and produced by Nigel Wright), the female pop act recorded Sincerely Yours EP named after a cover version of the US Top 20 song "Sincerely Yours" originally performed by the American Dance girl group Sweet Sensation on their 1988 debut album Take It While It's Hot. This material was produced by Jacques Zwart (a.k.a. E. Mergency), Marga Scheide's partner at the time.

Session musicians from the Dutch music scene were hired for the recording of this album: Bert Meulendijk, Eddie Conard, Hans Jansen Lex Bolderdijk, Omar Dupree and Ton op 't Hof. They had collaborated with artists like Bolland & Bolland, Paul de Leeuw, Gordon, Lee Towers, Herman Brood, and Dolly Dots. Despite their participation, the Sincerely Yours record failed to make any chart impact. However, though Luv' hadn't reached a mainstream success with this recording, their schedule was hectic. They often toured the club circuit in the Netherlands and Belgium and appeared on TV.

== Track listing ==
1. "Jungle Jive" (G. Thé, Marga Scheide, E. Mergency) – 3:23
2. "Sincerely Yours" (Ricardo Pagan, Joseph Malloy) – 4:25
3. "Sentimental Fool" (E. Mergency, Scheide) – 4:17
4. "Canta de la Luna" (E. Mergency, Scheide) – 4:15
5. "2am Saturday Night" (F. Rampen, E. Mergency) – 3:10
6. "Hasta Mañana" (E. Mergency, Scheide) – 5:33
7. "He's My Guy" (E. Mergency) – 3:44
8. "Live or Die" (A. Hol, Scheide, E. Mergency) – 3:32
9. "I Wanna Make Love to You" (Lion Keezer) – 3:26
10. "The Last Song" (E. Mergency, Scheide) – 4:31

== Singles ==
#	Title	Date
1.	"Hasta Mañana"	1990
2.	"Jungle Jive"	1991
3.	"He's My Guy"	1991
4.	"The Last Song"	1991

== Personnel ==
Luv'

- Marga Scheide – vocals
- Diana van Berlo – vocals
- Carina Lemoine – vocals

Additional musicians

- Jacques Zwart – keyboard/arranger
- Hans Jansen – keyboard
- Bert Meulendijk – guitar
- Lex Bolderijk – guitar
- Ton op 't Hof – drums
- Eddie Conard – percussion
- The Styluss Horns – horn section
- Omar Dupree – background vocals

Production

- Producer: Jacques Zwart
- Recorded at Hit Jam Studios, Dureco Studios and Wisseloord Studios
- Recording engineers: Sytze Gardenier, Erroll Lafleur, Margret van den Heuvel and Jacques Zwart

Design

- Photography: Patricia Steur
- Design: Meter
