= Run for Your Life (Beatles song) =

1965 song by the Beatles

- Cover of the song's sheet music

Song by the Beatles

from the album Rubber Soul
- Released: 3 December 1965
- Recorded: 12 October 1965
- Studio: EMI, London
- Genre: Rock and roll
- Length: 2:18
- Label: Parlophone
- Songwriter: Lennon–McCartney
- Producer: George Martin

"Run for Your Life" is a song by the English rock band the Beatles from their 1965 album Rubber Soul. It was written primarily by John Lennon, though credited to Lennon–McCartney.

== Lyrics ==
The song's lyrics establish a threatening tone towards the singer's unnamed girlfriend (referred to throughout the song as "little girl"), claiming "I'd rather see you dead, little girl, than to be with another man." The line was taken from an early Elvis Presley song, "Baby Let's Play House" (written by Arthur Gunter).

== Composition and recording ==
"Run for Your Life" was the first song recorded for Rubber Soul, on 12 October 1965; "Norwegian Wood (This Bird Has Flown)" was also recorded later that day. The song has only one section, a verse-refrain combination, with the guitar duet introducing a six-bar blues. As with most other songs on Rubber Soul, McCartney sings the higher register of the three-part harmony.

== Release and reception ==
Rubber Soul was released on 3 December 1965, with "Run for Your Life" sequenced as the album's closing song. Since release, the song has garnered a mixed-to-negative response from music critics. Lennon designated it as his "least favourite Beatles song" in a 1973 interview. He also stated that it was one of George Harrison's favourites on Rubber Soul at that time, despite Lennon's dislike of it. Ian MacDonald criticised the vocal performance and added these comments about the guitar: "The guitar-work, some of which is badly out of tune, is similarly rough, the piercingly simplistic blues solo suggesting that the player was not Harrison but Lennon himself." Thomas Ward of AllMusic similarly criticised the song, calling it "arguably the weakest" on Rubber Soul, and one of the "lesser items in the entire Lennon–McCartney songbook". Ward further criticised the song's lyrics, calling them "trite", and the melody, calling it "bland and uninteresting". While he did compliment Lennon's vocal performance and Harrison's "lovely" guitar part, he nonetheless deemed the song "one of the Beatles most dispensable items". The Beatles never performed the song live.

== Personnel ==
- John Lennon – vocal, acoustic 12-string guitar, slide guitar
- Paul McCartney – harmony vocal, bass
- George Harrison – harmony vocal, electric rhythm guitar, lead guitar
- Ringo Starr – drums, tambourine

Personnel per Ian MacDonald

== Covers ==
A 1966 version of "Run for Your Life" performed by Nancy Sinatra was released on her album Boots. Although it did not chart nationally, this version experienced regional success at such stations as WPTR in Albany, New York.

The song was also recorded by Gary Lewis & the Playboys on their album She's Just My Style, which was released in March 1966. Johnny Rivers also released the song in 1966 on his live album ...And I Know You Wanna Dance. Herman Brood covered the song on his 1989 album Yada Yada. Thee Headcoatees also covered it on their album "Girlsville" in 1991.
