= For You (Luv' mini album) =

EP by Luv'
- Released: November 1989
- Recorded: 1989
- Genre: Pop, Dance
- Length: 29:27
- Label: Dureco/High Fashion records
- Producer: Nigel Wright, John Smits, Margret

Luv' chronology
Goodbye Luv' (1981)	For You (1989)	Greatest Hits (1989)

For You is a mini-album by the Dutch girl group Luv', released in November 1989 by Dureco/High Fashion Records. It was recorded by a line-up different from the original formation, with Marga Scheide as the only remaining founding member.

The release features the moderate hit single "Welcome to My Party", along with "I Don't Wanna Be Lonely", "Girl Like Me", and "Hit-Medley". For You represented the group's return to the music scene following their disbandment in 1981.

== Background and conception ==
In late 1988 and early 1989, speculation arose in the Dutch and Flemish media regarding a potential reunion of the original Luv' members, who had achieved international popularity a decade earlier with hits such as "You're the Greatest Lover", "Trojan Horse", and "Casanova". The trio was briefly linked to a new recording project with British producers Stock Aitken Waterman, although the collaboration never materialized. José Hoebee declined participation due to family commitments, and soon afterward Patty Brard also opted out after signing a contract with the newly established Dutch commercial broadcaster RTL Véronique.

As a result, Marga Scheide remained the sole original member and, in the autumn of 1989, secured the rights to the group's name. She subsequently assembled a new line-up featuring vocalists Diana van Berlo and Michelle Gold. With the support of Scheide's partner Jacques Zwart (also known as E. Mergency), the group adopted a new musical direction. English record producer Nigel Wright, noted for his work with Shakatak, Imagination, and Mirage, was brought in to oversee the recordings.

The result was the EP For You, heavily influenced by the dance-pop sound of PWL, which at the time was enjoying commercial success in Western Europe with artists such as Kylie Minogue, Mel & Kim, Bananarama, and Rick Astley. Recording sessions were held at Dureco Studios in Weesp, with engineering completed in London.

The release of For You was first reported in the November 11, 1989 issue of the Pan-European trade magazine Music & Media. A follow-up article focusing on the mini-album appeared in the December 2, 1989 edition of Music & Media.

The lead single from For You, "Welcome to My Party", reached number 22 on the Dutch Top 40 and number 28 on the Flemish BRT Top 30. Although the song did not match the chart performance of the group's earlier hits from 1978 to 1980, it received moderate attention. Subsequent singles from the EP failed to chart, but the group maintained visibility through club performances and television appearances.

== Track listing ==
Track	Title	Songwriter(s)	Production credits	Time
1.	"Welcome to My Party"	R.Sommer, M. Schimscheimer, J. van Katwijk	Nigel Wright & John Smits	3:00
2.	"Girl Like Me"	Nigel Stock	Nigel Wright; Arranged by Nigel Stock	4:12
3.	"I Don't Wanna Be Lonely"	Nigel Stock	Nigel Wright; Arranged by Nigel Stock	4:07
4.	"Naughty"	M. Farina, G. Crivillente	Nigel Wright & John Smits	3:58
5.	"No Cure No Pay"	E. Mergency	Nigel Wright & John Smits	3:39
6.	"Medley" (12" Version)	Janschen & Janschens (pseudonym of Hans van Hemert & Piet Souer)	Margret; Arranged by E. Mergency	7:14

== Singles ==
#	Title	Date
1.	"Welcome to My Party"	October 1989
2.	"I Don't Wanna Be Lonely"	December 1989
3.	"Girl Like Me"	1990
4.	"Medley"	1990

== Personnel ==
Adapted from 'For You' Discogs credits

Marga Scheide	vocals
Michelle Gold	vocals
Diana van Berlo	vocals
Nigel Wright, Nigel Stock, John Smits, E. Mergency	synthesizers, keyboards, sequencing, programming

=== Production ===
Producers	Nigel Wright, John Smits, Margret, E. Mergency
Recording	Dureco Studio in Weesp
Engineer	Robin Sellars in London
Design	Bart Falkmann
Photography	Govert de Roos
