= Girl Like Me (Luv' song) =

Single by Luv'

from the album For You
- Released: 1990
- Recorded: 1989
- Genre: Eurobeat; pop; dance
- Length: 4:12
- Label: Toco/Beaver/Alfa International
- Songwriter: Nigel Stock
- Producer: Nigel Wright

Luv' singles chronology
| "Hit-Medley" (1990) | "Girl Like Me" (1990) | "Hasta Mañana" (1990) |

"Girl Like Me" is the twentieth single by Dutch girl group Luv', released in early 1990 by the labels Toco/Beaver Records/Alfa International. It appears on their 1989 EP For You. The song was only released in Japan as a commercial single, especially for discos and clubs, where it was marketed as a Eurobeat track.

== Background ==
During Luv's heyday (1977–1981), the female pop act failed in its attempt to get a hit record in Japan, whereas it dominated the music charts in a large part of Continental Europe, South Africa and Mexico. In 1980, the trio planned to take part in the Yamaha Music Festival but cancelled its participation to this competition. It prevented indeed Luv' from reaching the mainstream Japanese music market.

A decade later, as the Dutch vocal formation made its comeback with a different line-up, it tried to promote new material (produced by Nigel Wright) through the network of discos and clubs in the Asian archipelago. That's why, Luv's record company decided to release the song "Girl Like Me" as a Maxi single, hoping to have a club hit and later a mainstream chart topper. It was promoted as a Eurobeat song (this style of music was very popular back then in Japan). It also was included on Japanese Various Artists Eurobeat compilations. However, this strategy to adapt the Japanese market didn't succeed. Nowadays, this single is a rare collector item among Luv's fans.

The music arrangements of this song were inspired by those of the hits composed by Stock Aitken Waterman, the successful British producers in the late 1980s.

== Formats and track listings ==
- 7-inch single
1. "Girl Like Me" (single version) – 4:12
2. "No Cure No Pay" – 3:39
- CD single and 12-inch single
1. "Girl Like Me" (extended version)
2. "Girl Like Me" (single version) – 4:12
3. "No Cure No Pay" – 3:39
