= Wait a Minute =

Wait a Minute may refer to:

- Wait a Minute (album), a 1980 album by Herman Brood & His Wild Romance
- "Wait a Minute" (The Pussycat Dolls song), 2006
- "Wait a Minute" (Ray J song), 2000
- "Wait a Minute!", a 2015 single by Willow
- "Wait a Minute (Just a Touch)", a 2007 song by Estelle
- "Wait a Minute", a song by The Hives from their 2012 album Lex Hives
- "Wait a Minute", a song by yourcodenameis:milo from their 2006 album Print Is Dead Vol 1

== See also ==
- Wait-a-minute tree
