= The Last Song (Luv' song) =

Single by Luv'

from the album Sincerely Yours
- Released: June 1991
- Recorded: 1990
- Genre: Pop
- Length: 4:31
- Label: RCA Records/BMG
- Songwriters: Jacques Zwart (a.k.a. E. Mergency) and Marga Scheide
- Producer: Jacques Zwart (a.k.a. E. Mergency)

Luv' singles chronology
"Jungle Jive" (1991)	"The Last Song" (1991)	"He's My Guy" (1991)

"The Last Song" is the twenty-third single by Dutch girl group Luv', released in 1991 by RCA Records/BMG. It appears on their 1991 album Sincerely Yours.

== Song history ==
After releasing three joyful singles, "Hasta Mañana" (1990), "Jungle Jive" (1991) and "He's My Guy" (1991), RCA Records/BMG decided that the follow-up record to come out would be the pop ballad "The Last Song", composed by Jacques Zwart and his partner, the Luv' singer Marga Scheide. Like any track from the 1991 Sincerely Yours album, Zwart produced the song, surrounded by a team of session musicians (Bert Meulendijk, Eddie Conard, Hans Jansen, Lex Bolderdijk and Ton op 't Hof) who worked with popular Dutch artists (like Bolland & Bolland, Paul de Leeuw, Gordon, Lee Towers, Herman Brood, and Dolly Dots). Moreover, Omar Dupree (a former member of America Gypsy and Band of Gold, famous bands in the Dutch scene in the 1970s and 1980s) recorded background vocals on "The Last Song".

Despite the participation of the successful above-mentioned musicians, the single flopped and failed to make any chart impact.
