= The Radios =

Belgian pop band (1990–1994)

- The Radios in 1992: From left, Dany Lademacher, Robert Mosuse, Ronny Mosuse, Bart Peeters, Alain Van Zeveren, Marc Bonne

Background information
- Origin: Belgium
- Genres: Pop rock
- Years active: 1990–1994
- Label: EMI Music Belgium
- Past members: Bart Peeters; Ronny Mosuse; Robert Mosuse †; Dany Lademacher †; Alain Van Zeveren; Marc Bonne

The Radios was a Belgian pop band that was founded at the end of the 1980s by singer/songwriter Bart Peeters.

The group was initially named Bart Peeters & the Radios, with members Paul Michiels and Jan Leyers. Their first hit was "I'm into Folk", released in 1988. However, when Michiels and Leyers scored an international hit (The Way to Your Heart) with their other project Soulsister, they were forced to say goodbye to Bart Peeters & the Radios.

Brothers Ronny and Robert Mosuse, who made a splash during the 1988 Humo's Rock Rally, became members of The Radios, as did guitarist Dany Lademacher (a member of Herman Brood & His Wild Romance for many years).

The group scored their greatest hit with "She Goes Nana" in 1992, a song that topped the Belgian hit parade (Ultratop) for 6 weeks. The band toured around the world in that era. Other hits were "Teardrops", "Walking the Thin Line", "She's My Lover" and "Dreaming Wild". Meanwhile, the group is carrying a heavy secret: Robert Mosuse has an untreatable brain tumor, but he wants to spend his remaining time on stage, while the fans have no idea.

In 1994, at the height of their success, internal struggles eventually led to the split of The Radios, and they each went their own way.

Robert Mosuse died in 2000, at the age of 30.

== Members ==
- Bart Peeters (singer/guitar)
- Ronny Mosuse (singer/bass)
- Robert Mosuse (singer/percussion)
- Dany Lademacher (guitar/singer)
- Alain Van Zeveren (keyboard/accordion)
- Marc Bonne (drums)

=== Guest musicians ===
- Walter Mets (drums)

== Discography ==
"No Television" album cover

=== No Television (1990) ===
1. Gimme Love
2. The One
3. Stars of Heaven
4. She Talks to the Rain
5. Tears in the Morning
6. Lucky Day
7. Radio
8. Swimming in the Pool
9. I'm into Folk
10. Lay Down
11. 26 Guitars of Love
12. Blue Roses

=== The Sound of Music (1992) ===
1. Think of You
2. Because She Said So
3. She Goes Nana
4. Dreaming Wild
5. Walking the Thin Line
6. Oh No!
7. Sleeples Nights
8. She's My Lover (She's My Friend)
9. Devil in My Cheekbone
10. S.O.S. to an Angel
11. Bang Bang
12. In The Nighttime

=== Live (1993) ===
1. Pop Stands Up
2. Lucky Day
3. Oh No!
4. Walking the Thin Line
5. Devil in My Cheekbone
6. Sleepless Nights
7. Gimme Love
8. Swimming in the Pool (incl. On My Radio)
9. Back to Boystown
10. She's My Lover (She's My Friend)
11. Dreaming Wild
12. Does Your Mother Know
13. She Goes Nana
14. I Wish
15. I'm into Folk
16. Non, Non, Rien N'a Changé
17. S.O.S. to an Angel (The Forbidden Word Version) (Bonus-record on special edition)

=== Baby Yes! (1994) ===
1. I Wanna Hold Your Hand
2. If the Sun
3. Move It Right Now
4. Mystery Mountains
5. Baby Yes!
6. Teardrops
7. Sad World
8. Miracle Man
9. The Fiddler
10. Cinderella Sometimes
11. Wild Planet
12. Sweet Kisses

=== The Best Of (1997) ===
1. She Goes Nana
2. Gimme Love
3. I'm into Folk
4. Swimming in the Pool
5. Lucky Day (live)
6. Non, Non, Rien N'a Changé (live)
7. Tears in the Morning
8. Dreaming Wild
9. SOS to an Angel
10. Walking the Thin Line
11. Oh No (live)
12. Teardrops
13. Cinderella Sometimes
14. Move It Right Now
15. Because She Said So
16. Devil in My Cheekbone
17. If the Sun
18. She's My Lover (She's My Friend) (live)
