= Bühnensucht =

Live album by Herman Brood & His Wild Romance
- Released: 1985
- Recorded: Parkzicht, Rotterdam
- Genre: Rock and roll, blues
- Label: Sky

Herman Brood & His Wild Romance chronology
The Brood (1984)	Bühnensucht (1985)	Yada Yada (1988)

Bühnensucht is a live album by Dutch rock and roll and blues group Herman Brood & His Wild Romance. The album reached No.41 on the Dutch album chart on 5 October 1985, and stayed on the chart for six weeks.

The album was re-released on CD by Telstar on 26 July 2001.

== Track listing ==
No.	Title	Length
1.	"Tune (Intro (Peer Gynt Suite))" (E. Grieg)	0:50
2.	"(Get) Married" (Hollestelle, Brood)	2:20
3.	"(There Ain't) No Love" (Bobby Bland)	2:53
4.	"Checkin' Out" (Brood, Hollestelle)	3:35
5.	"Heatwave (Heat Wave)" (Holland-Dozier-Holland)	2:30
6.	"(Hell On) Wheels" (Brood, Hollestelle)	2:32
7.	"Saturday Night" (Brood, Danny Lademacher)	3:22
8.	"Kissed (Then She Kissed Me)" (Phil Spector, Ellie Greenwich, Jeff Barry)	2:30
9.	"(No More) Dancin'" (John Hiatt)	2:44
10.	"Something (Wrong)" (David Porter, Isaac Hayes)	3:14
11.	"Workin' (The Road)" (Brood, Hollestelle)	2:55
12.	"Stay Alive" (Brood, Hollestelle, Angelo)	5:45
13.	"Don't (Do)" (Brood, Hollestelle)	2:05

== Personnel ==
- Herman Brood – piano, keyboards, vocals
- David Hollestelle – guitar
- Gee Carlsberg – bass
- Ad Vanderee – drums
- Robbie Schmitz – vocals
- Lies Schilp – vocals
