= Rock 'n' Roll Junkie =

Rock n Roll Junkie
- Directed by: Jan Eilander
- Produced by: Ton Van Der Lee
- Release date: 1994
- Running time: 90 minutes
- Country: Netherlands
- Language: Dutch

Rock n Roll Junkie is a 1994 Dutch documentary film directed by Jan Eilander. The film is about Herman Brood.
