= I Don't Wanna Be Lonely =

Single by Luv'

from the album For You
- Released: December 1989
- Recorded: 1989
- Genre: Pop; dance
- Length: 4:07
- Label: Dureco/High Fashion
- Songwriter: Nigel Stock
- Producer: Nigel Wright

Luv' singles chronology
"Starmaker with the All Stars" (1989)	"I Don't Wanna Be Lonely" (1989)	"Hit-Medley" (1990)

"I Don't Wanna Be Lonely" is the eighteenth single by Dutch girl group Luv', released in December 1989 by the labels Dureco/High Fashion Music. It appears on the EP For You, featuring a formation different from the original line-up.

== Background ==
After the release of the 1989 single "Welcome to My Party", which marked Luv's comeback, the next single taken from the 1989 EP For You was "I Don't Wanna Be Lonely", a cover version of a 1989 club hit by Joan Orleans. The music arrangements of this song were inspired by those of the hits released by PWL, the British leading dance label in the late 1980s.

The release of "I Don't Wanna Be Lonely" was first reported in the December 2, 1989 edition of the Pan-European trade magazine Music & Media.

== Commercial performance ==
"I Don't Wanna Be Lonely" did not enter any record chart.

== Formats and track listings ==
"I Don't Wanna Be Lonely" came out in three formats.

- 7-inch single
1. "I Don't Wanna Be Lonely – 3:37
2. "Medley" - 5:16
  "Greatest Lover"/"Trojan Horse"/"Yes I Do"/"Casanova"/"U.O.Me"
- 7-inch single (Spanish edition)
1. "I Don't Wanna Be Lonely – 3:37
2. "No Cure No Pay" - 3:39
- 12-inch single - Maxi single (Spanish edition)
1. "I Don't Wanna Be Lonely – 4:07
2. "No Cure No Pay" - 3:39
