= He's My Guy =

Single by Luv'

from the album Sincerely Yours
- Released: September 1991
- Recorded: 1990
- Genre: Pop/Jazz
- Length: 3:44
- Label: RCA Records/BMG
- Songwriter: Jacques Zwart (a.k.a. E. Mergency)
- Producer: Jacques Zwart (a.k.a. E. Mergency)

Luv' singles chronology
"The Last Song" (1991)	"He's My Guy" (1991)	"This Old Heart of Mine (Is Weak for You)" (1992)

"He's My Guy" is the twenty-fourth single by Dutch girl group Luv', released in 1991 by RCA Records/BMG. It appears on their 1991 album Sincerely Yours.

== Song history ==
Luv' experienced difficult career moves in the early 1990s. Its line-up had frequently changed and it signed a succession of short-term record deals. From a successful international pop act in the late 1970s, it changed, more than a decade later, into a formation which had trouble scoring hits in the charts. With the help from famous Dutch session musicians (such as Bert Meulendijk, Eddie Conard, Hans Jansen Lex Bolderdijk, Omar Dupree and Ton op 't Hof), Luv' recorded in 1991 eclectic material (including elements of flamenco, jazz, rap, dance and pop) that led to the release of the Sincerely Yours album. After the singles "Hasta Mañana" (1990), Jungle Jive (1991), and The Last Song had come out, the fourth song chosen to be released commercially was "He's My Guy", a jazz/pop ballad whose sound and orchestration was different from Luv's previous records. This track was composed and produced by Jacques Zwart (Marga Scheide's partner).

== Chart performance ==
The single failed to break into the Dutch Top 40 but peaked at #21 on the Tipparade which lists the singles below number 40 that have not yet entered the official charts. It also reached the 75th position on the Nationale Top 100 (currently Single Top 100) in October 1991.

Chart (1991)	Peak position
Netherlands (Nationale Top 100, currently Single Top 100)	75
