= Daniël Boissevain =

Dutch actor

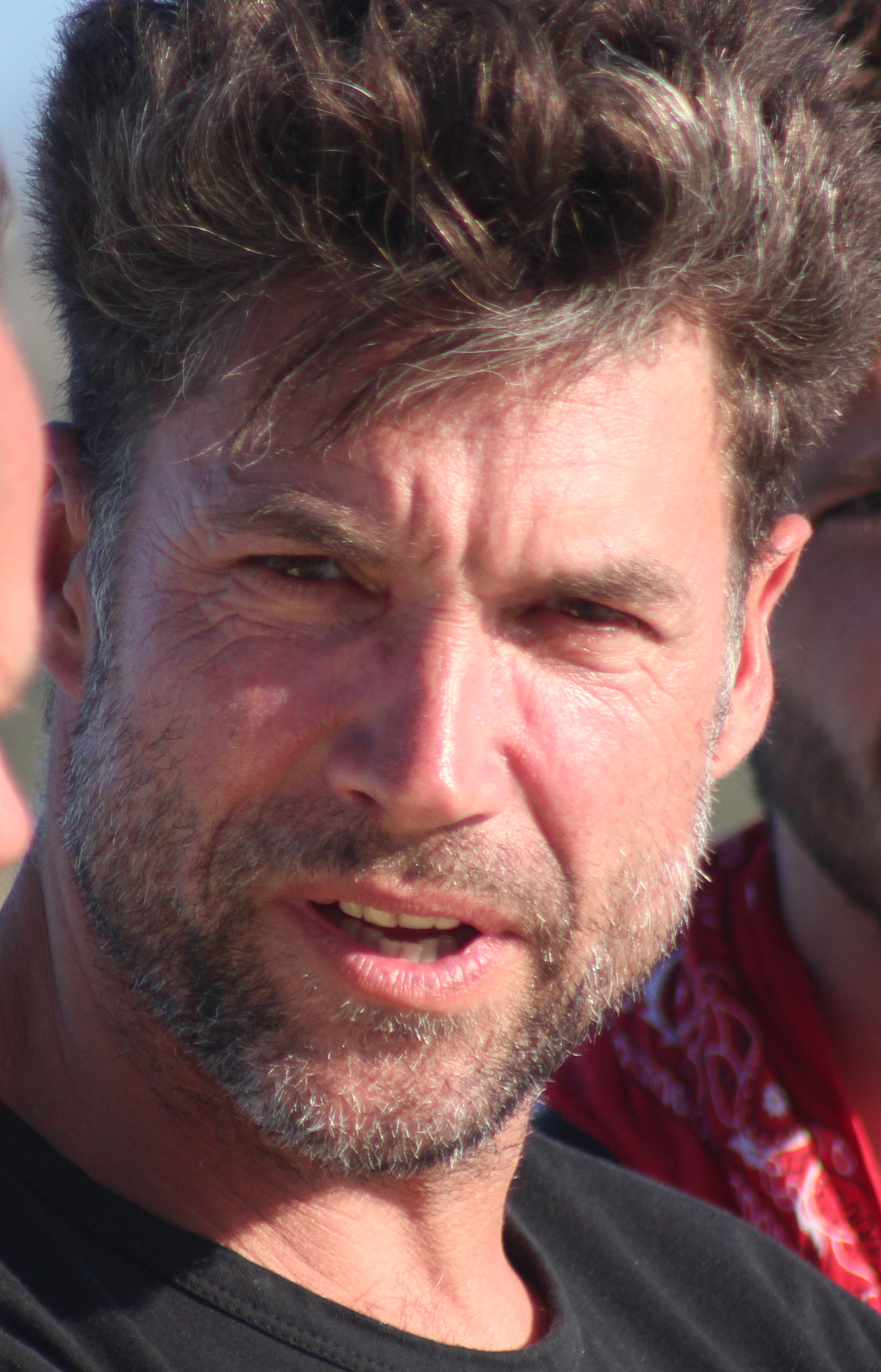
- Daniël Boissevain, 2015
- Born: 29 June 1969 (age 56); Amsterdam, Netherlands
- Occupation: Actor
- Years active: 1992–present

Daniël Boissevain (born 29 June 1969) is a Dutch actor. He has appeared in more than fifty films since 1992.

== Selected filmography ==
Year	Title	Role	Notes
1993	Angie	Alex	
1996	De Zeemeerman	Tony	
1997	All Stars	Johnny	
2000	Ochtendzwemmers		
2004	Mindhunters		
2006	Wild Romance	Herman Brood	
2011	Gooische Vrouwen		
2020	The Host	Albert Tribbe	
