= Hit-Medley =

Single by Luv'

from the album For You
- Released: 1990
- Recorded: 1989
- Genre: Pop; dance
- Length: 3:59 (single version); 7:14 (12-inch version)
- Label: Dureco/High Fashion (Benelux); RCA/BMG (Germany)
- Songwriters: Hans van Hemert; Piet Souer (a.k.a. Janschen & Janschens)
- Producers: Marga Scheide (as Margret); Jacques Zwart (a.k.a. 'E. Mergency)

Luv' singles chronology
"I Don't Wanna Be Lonely" (1990)	"Hit-Medley" (1990)	"Girl Like Me" (1990)

"Hit-Medley" is the nineteenth single by Dutch girl group Luv', released in 1990 by the labels Dureco/High Fashion Music in the Benelux and RCA Records/BMG in Germany. It appears on their 1989 EP For You. This medley is composed from parts of Luv's greatest hits re-recorded by a new formation (Marga Scheide, the only original member and two other vocalists Michelle Gold and Diana van Berlo).

== Background ==
When Luv' was reformed in 1989 with a new line-up, the goal was to reach the peak of the original trio. The new version of the pop act recorded new material produced by Nigel Wright and musically inspired by the Stock Aitken Waterman productions. It only scored a Top 30 hit in the Netherlands and in Flanders (Belgium) with the "Welcome to My Party" single. The follow-up singles didn't top the charts at all.

Then, a dance music medley (including five successful chart toppers from the original Luv' repertoire re-recorded by the 1989 formation) was released as a single. Once again, it failed to break into the hit lists.

== Formats and track listings ==
- 7-inch single
1. "Hit-Medley" (single version) – 3:59
  "You're the Greatest Lover"/"Trojan Horse"/"Ooh, Yes I Do"/"Casanova"/"U.O.Me (Theme from Waldolala)"
2. "No Cure No Pay" – 3:39
- CD single and 12-inch single
1. "Hit-Medley" (12-inch version) – 7:14
  "You're the Greatest Lover"/"Trojan Horse"/"Ooh, Yes I Do"/"Casanova"/"U.O.Me (Theme from Waldolala)"
2. "Hit-Medley" (single version) – 3:59
  "You're the Greatest Lover"/"Trojan Horse"/"Ooh, Yes I Do"/"Casanova"/"U.O.Me (Theme from Waldolala)"
3. "No Cure No Pay" – 3:39
