= Go Nutz =

Album by Herman Brood

Studio album by Herman Brood & His Wild Romance
- Released: 1980
- Genre: Rock and roll, blues
- Label: Ariola
- Producer: Tim O'Brien

Herman Brood & His Wild Romance chronology
Herman Brood & His Wild Romance (1978)	Go Nutz (1980)	Wait a Minute (1980)

Singles from Go Nutz
- 1. "Love You Like I Love Myself" Released: 1979; 2. "Hot Shot" Released: 1980; 3. "I Don't Need You" Released: 1980

Professional ratings
Review scores
Source	Rating
Allmusic	1/5 stars

Go Nutz is the third studio album by Dutch rock and roll and blues group Herman Brood & His Wild Romance. Three singles came from the album, "Love You Like I Love Myself," "Hot Shot," and "I Don't Need You," all of which charted in the Netherlands. On the Dutch album chart, the album reached #6 on 8 March 1980, and stayed on the chart for nine weeks.

Go Nutz was re-released on CD in 1996 by Sony BMG/Ariola.

== Track listing ==
No.	Title	Length
1.	"Go Nutz"	3:05
2.	"Love You Like I Love Myself" (Strack van Strijndel)	3:32
3.	"I Don't Need You" (Brood, Lademacher)	3:36
4.	"I'll Be Doggone"	3:43
5.	"Right on the Money"	4:26
6.	"Hot Shot" (Brood, Lademacher)	3:30
7.	"Born Before My Time"	4:28
8.	"Beauty is Only Skin Deep"	2:58
9.	"Easy Pick Up"	4:33
10.	"Laurie"	4:05

== Production and reception ==
Go Nutz, recorded in the United States, was supposed to follow up on the American success of the single "Saturday Night" (from Shpritsz) and a compilation called Herman Brood & His Wild Romance, made specifically for the American market. The Dutch market was ripe for another Brood album, since the single "Never be Clever" had reached #10 in the Dutch singles chart on 16 June 1979. However, the recording sessions were a disaster; the American producers replaced the rest of the band with session musicians, resulting in a disappointing album and the disbanding of the hitherto successful quartet of Brood, Lademacher, Cavalli, and Meerman. The album produced three charting singles in the Netherlands, but failed to chart in the US.

== Singles ==
"Love You Like I Love Myself" was released as a single (with "Hit" on the B-side) in 1979; it peaked at #12 in the Dutch Top 50 on 17 November 1979, and was on the charts for seven weeks. "Hot Shot" reached # in the Dutch Top 50 on 16 February 1980, and was on the charts for seven weeks. "I Don't Need You" reached #29 in the Dutch Top 50 on 10 and 17 May 1980, and was on the charts for four weeks.

== Personnel ==
- Herman Brood - piano, keyboards, vocals
- Freddy Cavalli - bass
- Eric Nelson bass guitar
- Charles Francour - vocals
- Roger Gordon - drums
- Stephen Hines - keyboards
- Rick Kellis - saxophone
- Craig Krampf - drums
- Danny Lademacher - guitar
- Darlene Love - vocals
- Lenny Macaluso - guitar
- Cees Meerman - drums
- Rage Porazzo - percussion
- Edna Wright - vocals
- Tim O'Brien - producer
- Ryan Ulyate - sound engineer
