= Yada Yada (album) =

Studio album by Herman Brood & His Wild Romance
- Released: 1988
- Genre: Rock and roll, blues
- Label: CBS
- Producer: George Kooymans

Herman Brood & His Wild Romance chronology
Bühnensucht (1985)	Yada Yada (1988)	Hooks (1989)

Yada Yada is the eighth studio album by Dutch rock and roll and blues group Herman Brood & His Wild Romance. The album, produced by George Kooymans of Golden Earring, was one of many moderately successful albums by Brood in the mid 1980s; it reached #9 on the Dutch album chart on 19 March 1988, and stayed on the chart for 14 weeks.

== Track listing ==
No.	Title	Length
1.	"Reel to Reel" (Wild Romance)	4:04
2.	"Sleepin' Bird" (Wild Romance)	4:10
3.	"Groovin'" (Brood, Vandenburg)	4:11
4.	"Street Flower" (R.Englebert, H.Brood)	2:56
5.	"Love So Strong" (Wild Romance)	3:03
6.	"Cut Me Loose" (R.Englebert, H.Brood)	4:02
7.	"Babies" (Wild Romance)	3:22
8.	"Tough" (Wild Romance)	3:37
9.	"Ghost" (Wild Romance)	2:36
10.	"Run for Your Life" (John Lennon, Paul McCartney)	1:50
11.	"Bucket Boy" (R.Englebert, H.Brood)	4:60
12.	"Strange Delight" (R.Englebert, H.Brood)	3:49

== Singles ==
Three singles came from this album. "Groovin'" and "Babies" failed to chart, but "Sleepin' Bird" (B-side "Cut Me Loose," "Street Flower") reached #27 in the Dutch Top 40 on 2 April 1988, and stayed on the chart for four weeks.

== Personnel ==
- Herman Brood - piano, vocals
- Rudy Englebert - bass guitar, vocals
- Ani Meerman - drums, vocals
- David Hollestelle - guitar
- Danny Lademacher - guitar, vocals
- Otto Cooymans - additional keyboards
