= Hooks (album) =

Studio album by Herman Brood & His Wild Romance
- Released: 1989
- Genre: Rock and roll, blues
- Label: CBS
- Producer: John Tilley

Herman Brood & His Wild Romance chronology
Yada Yada (1988)	Hooks (1989)	Freeze (1990)

Hooks is the ninth studio album by the Dutch rock and roll and blues group Herman Brood & His Wild Romance. The album reached No. 28 on the Dutch album chart on 17 June 1989, and stayed on the chart for 10 weeks. Both of the early Wild Romance guitarists, Danny Lademacher and David Hollestelle, play on Hooks.

== Track listing ==
No.	Title	Length
1.	"Will You Still Love Me Tomorrow"
2.	"Somethin' Else"
3.	"What Becomes of the Broken Hearted"
4.	"Mabellene"
5.	"Hard to Handle"
6.	"Hold on to My Love"
7.	"Dum Dum Hole"
8.	"Great Balls of Fire"
9.	"Help Me Rhonda"
10.	"Don't Go to Strangers"
11.	"Brown Eyed Handsome Man"
12.	"That's The Way Love Goes"
13.	"Saga of NY"
14.	"Little Sister"

== Personnel ==
- Herman Brood – piano, keyboards, vocals
- Roy Bakkers – drums
- Rudy Engelbert – bass guitar, vocals
- David Hollestelle – guitar
- Danny Lademacher – guitar, vocals
- Christian Ramon – engineer
