= My Way (Herman Brood album) =

Compilation album by Herman Brood & His Wild Romance
- Released: 2001
- Genre: Rock and roll, blues
- Label: Ariola
- Producer: Henkjan Smits, Koos van Dijk

Herman Brood & His Wild Romance chronology
Ciao Monkey (2000)	My Way (2001)

Singles from My Way
- 1. "My Way" Released: 2001

My Way is a posthumous compilation album with music by Dutch rock and roll and blues artist Herman Brood, released shortly after his suicide on 11 July 2001. The album produced a number one single, the first of Brood's career: "My Way" reached number one on 18 August 2001. On the Dutch album chart, the album reached #5 on 20 October 2001, and stayed on the chart for 57 weeks. It was certified gold in 2002.

== Track listing ==
No.	Title	Length
1.	"Saturday Night" (Brood, Lademacher)	3:42
2.	"Love You Like I Love Myself" (E. Strack van Schijndel)	3:33
3.	"Still Believe" (Borgers, Smeenk)	3:14
4.	"Never Be Clever" (Brood, Lademacher)	3:04
5.	"Hot Shot" (Brood, Lademacher)	3:26
6.	"Too Much Grace" (Brood, Hollestelle)	3:07
7.	"Blew My Cool Over You" (Alberts)	3:08
8.	"Als Je Wint Heb Je Vrienden" (Vrienten)	3:28
9.	"Hold On Tight" (Brood, Hollestelle)	3:12
10.	"Tattoo Song" (Brood)	3:10
11.	"Checkin' Out" (Brood, Del Monte Lyon)	2:59
12.	"If Love Is Dead" (Wieczorek)	2:29
13.	"All The Girls 're Crazy" (Montgomery)	3:30
14.	"Street" (Brood)	2:45
15.	"I Don't Need You" (Brood, Lademacher)	3:39
16.	"50 Jaar" (Vrienten)	4:31
17.	"Pijn" (Buitenhuis)	3:04
18.	"Sleepin' Bird" (Brood)	4:11
19.	"Rock 'n' Roll Junkie" (Brood)	2:49
20.	"Saturday Night (big band version)" (Brood, Lademacher)	2:30
21.	"Back on the Corner" (Allison)	2:34
22.	"Dance On" (Brood)	3:41
23.	"When I Get Home" (Cave)	1:42
24.	"My Way" (Paul Anka, Claude François, Jacques Revaux)	4:47

== Singles ==
"My Way" reached number one on 18 August 2001 and stayed there for three weeks, spending 14 weeks on the chart.

== Personnel ==
- Herman Brood – piano, keyboard, vocals
- Monica Tjen Akwoei – vocals
- Bertus Borgers – saxophone
- Freddy Cavalli – bass
- Josee van Iersel – vocals
- Danny Lademacher – guitar
- Ani Meerman – drums
- Robert Jan Stips – keyboards
- Floor van Zutphen – vocals
- Robin Freeman – sound engineer
