= Angie (1993 film) =

1993 film

- Directed by: Martin Lagestee
- Written by: Martin Lagestee
- Produced by: Martin Lagestee
- Starring: Annemarie Röttgering, Derek de Lint, Daniël Boissevain
- Cinematography: Tom Erisman
- Edited by: Herman P. Koerts
- Music by: Clifford Scholten; Joop Koopman
- Production companies: Lagestee Film B.V.; Veronica
- Distributed by: Meteor Film
- Release date: 1993
- Running time: 93 minutes
- Country: Netherlands
- Language: Dutch

Angie is a 1993 Dutch crime thriller film directed by Martin Lagestee. The film is about a girl named Angie (Annemarie Röttgering) who becomes involved in a life of crime.

== Plot ==
After her return from an orphanage with her mother, Angie tries again to build a normal life. The mutual distrust is enormous. After a nasty incident with her mother's new friend Angie turns to her older brother Alex, a delinquent. While Angie is determined to make something of her life, she gets quickly caught up in the criminal world and pulls off a heist with her brother and crew and hit the road.

== Cast ==
- Annemarie Röttgering as Angie Kempers
- Derek de Lint as Peter Koudbier
- Daniël Boissevain as Alex, Angie's older brother
- Hidde Schols as Frank Rothuizen
- Marijke Veugelers as Angie's mother
- Peter Tuinman as Detective Burger
- Jack Wouterse as Frits
