= Frisz & Sympatisz =

Studio album by Herman Brood & His Wild Romance
- Released: 1982
- Genre: Rock and roll, blues
- Label: Ariola
- Producer: Tom Barlage

Herman Brood & His Wild Romance chronology
Modern Times Revive (1981)	Frisz & Sympatisz (1982)	The Brood (1984)

Frisz & Sympatisz is the sixth studio album by Dutch rock and roll and blues group Herman Brood & His Wild Romance. The album was produced by Tom Barlage.

== Track listing ==
No.	Title	Length
1.	"Stay Alive"	4:32
2.	"Kissed Me"	2:08
3.	"Job"	3:08
4.	"Baby Please"	3:45
5.	"Hassle"	1:54
6.	"Berlin Schmerzt"	3:15
7.	"Side Line"	4:32
8.	"If Love is Dead"	2:26
9.	"I Gotta Know"	4:02
10.	"Hold Back"	3:53
11.	"Suicide"	3:20

== Personnel ==
- Herman Brood – piano, keyboards, vocals
- Bertus Borgers – saxophone
- Wally Langdon – bass
- David Hollestelle – guitar, keyboards
- Roger Angelo – drums
- Robbie Schmitz – vocals
- Tom Barlage – producer
