= Jules Deelder =

Dutch poet (1944–2019)

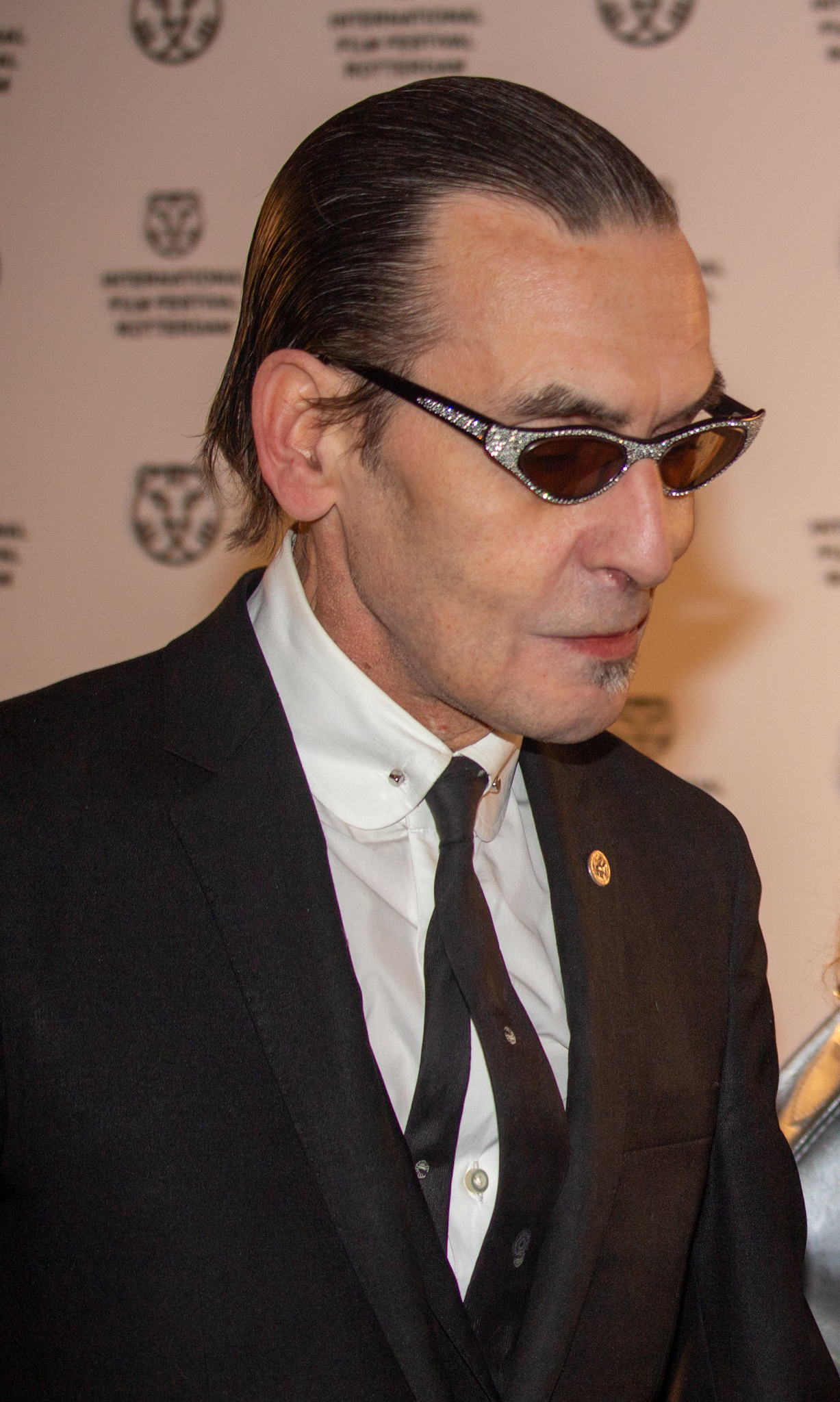
- Jules Deelder in 2015
- Born: Julius Anton Deelder; 24 November 1944 Rotterdam, Netherlands
- Died: 19 December 2019 (aged 75) Rotterdam
- Language: Dutch
- Education: HBS
- Genres: Poetry, comedy
- Years active: 1960–2019
- Notable awards: Anna Blaman Prijs (1988)

Jules Anton Deelder (24 November 1944 – 19 December 2019) was a Dutch poet, spoken word poet and writer. His poems cover topics such as life in the city of Rotterdam, drug use, and jazz. He was very passionate about the Dutch language and feared that European integration would cause smaller languages like Dutch to become a "folkloric" curiosity. He was well known in the Netherlands for his live performances and appearances in Dutch popular media. He collaborated with musicians and bands such as Herman Brood, Benjamin Herman and Bas van Lier to record and perform his poetry. His prominent role in the cultural life of Rotterdam earned him the nickname "night mayor of Rotterdam."

In 1954, Deelders discovered jazz at the age of 9 when he first heard Chet Baker. It gave him goose bumps, and jazz would become his religion. Deelder was the presenter of his own jazz radio show, Deelder Draait, on Arrow Jazz FM. He also wrote scripts for the comic book series Amber en Akka and Professor Hilarius, drawn by Rob Peters. He furthermore inspired a celebrity comic of his own, Juul Deeldert, drawn by Vick Debergh.

== Bibliography ==
=== Poetry ===
- Gloria Satoria (De Bezige Bij, 1969)
- Dag en nacht geopend (De Bezige Bij, 1970)
- Boe! (De Bezige Bij, 1972)
- Op de deurknop na (De Bezige Bij, 1972)
- De zwarte jager (De Bezige Bij, 1973)
- Moderne gedichten (De Bezige Bij, 1979)
- Sturm und Drang (De Bezige Bij, 1980)
- Junkers Ju 88 (De Bezige Bij, 1983)
- Portret van Olivia de Havilland (De Bezige Bij, 1985)
- Interbellum (De Bezige Bij, 1987)
- Lijf- en andere gedichten (De Bezige Bij, 1991)
- Renaissance: gedichten ’44-’94 (De Bezige Bij, 1994)
- Transeuropa (De Bezige Bij, 1995)
- Het lot van de eenhoorn (De Bezige Bij, 1997)
- Bijbelsch (De Bezige Bij, 1999)
- N.V. Verga (De Bezige Bij, 2001)
- Inderdaad nee (with drawings of Herman Brood; Nijgh en Van Ditmar, 2003)
- Zonder dollen (De Bezige Bij, 2004)
- Vrijwel alle gedichten (De Bezige Bij, 2004)
- Tussentijds (De Bezige Bij, 2008)
- Ruisch (De Bezige Bij, 2011)
- Het graf van Descartes (De Bezige Bij, 2013)
- Rotterdamse kost (CPNB, 2017)

=== Novels and other fiction ===
- Proza (short stories; Boelen, 1976)
- The Dutch Windmill (biography of Bep van Klaveren; Veen, 1980)
- Schöne Welt (short stories; De Bezige Bij, 1982)
- Modern passé (short stories; De Bezige Bij, 1984)
- Drukke dagen (short stories; De Bezige Bij, 1985)
- Gemengde gevoelens (novel; De Bezige Bij, 1986)
- De T van Vondel (short stories; De Bezige Bij, 1990)
- Jazz (short stories; De Bezige Bij, 1992)
- Geheid Deelder (De Bezige Bij, 1994)
- De bevrijding van Koos Spook (children's story; De Bezige Bij, 1995)
- De dikke van Deelder (short stories; De Bezige Bij, 1997)
- Vrijwel alle verhalen (short stories; De Bezige Bij, 2009)

=== Comics ===
- Amber & Akka (with Rob Peters; De Lijn, 1985)

== Discography ==
- Deelder Speaks theatre show recording (EMI, 1986)
- Kiezen Of Deelder theatre show recording (BMG, 1990)
- Deelder Drumt Jazz music, stories and poetry (Zillion, 1993)
- Oh Kut hit single with Herman Brood (Ariola, 1997)
- Deelder Draait compilation of music from Deelder's jazz collection (Sonic Scenery, 2002)
- Deelder Draait Door compilation of music from Deelder's jazz collection (Sonic Scenery, 2003)
- Deelder Blijft Draaien compilation of music from Deelder's jazz collection (Sonic Scenery, 2004)
- Deelder Rhythm compilation of music from Deelder's jazz collection (Sonic Scenery, 2006)
- Totaal Loss music and poetry, with composer/designer Louis Gauthier (Prometheus, 2011)
- De Deeldeliers music and poetry, with Bas van Lier and others (Embrace Recordings, 2013)
