= The Brood (album) =

Studio album by Herman Brood & His Wild Romance
- Released: 1984
- Genre: Rock and roll, blues
- Label: Sky
- Producer: Herman Brood & His Wild Romance

Herman Brood & His Wild Romance chronology
Frisz & Sympatisz (1982)	The Brood (1984)	Bühnensucht (1985)

The Brood is the seventh studio album by Dutch rock and roll and blues group Herman Brood & His Wild Romance. The album reached No. 22 on the Dutch album chart on 16 June 1984, and stayed on the chart for 17 weeks.

== Track listing ==
No.	Title	Length
1.	"Tattoo Song" (Brood)
2.	"Lady Killer" (George Young, Harry Vanda)
3.	"Help Me" (Brood, Gee Carlsberg)
4.	"Burn" (Brood, David Hollestelle)
5.	"Price" (Brood, David Hollestelle)
6.	"Answer (as a Man)" (Brood, David Hollestelle)
7.	"Hassle" (Brood, David Hollestelle)
8.	"Eyes" (Todd Rundgren)
9.	"Fake" (Brood, Jim Carroll)
10.	"No Ballad" (Henny Vrienten)
11.	"Nightcat" (Bertus Borgers)
12.	"My Girl" (Smokey Robinson)
13.	"Speedo" (Esther Navarro)
14.	"Groupie Girl" (Tony Joe White)

== Personnel ==
- Herman Brood – piano, keyboards, vocals
- Jean Blaute – synthesizer
- Bertus Borgers – saxophone
- Gee Carlsberg – bass
- Michael Dawe – drums
- David Hollestelle – guitar, keyboards, vocals
- Lies Schilp – vocals
- Robbie Schmitz – vocals
- Ad van der Ree – drums
- Evert Verhees – bass
- Henny Vrienten – vocals on "No Ballad"
- Jan Hollestelle – bass on "No ballad"
- Joost Belinfante – mouth harp on "No ballad"
