= Wait a Minute (album) =

Studio album by Herman Brood & His Wild Romance
- Released: 1980
- Genre: Rock and roll, blues
- Label: Ariola

Herman Brood & His Wild Romance chronology
Go Nutz (1980)	Wait a Minute (1980)	Modern Times Revive (1981)

Wait a Minute is the fourth studio album by Dutch rock and roll and blues group Herman Brood & His Wild Romance. After the commercial and artistic debacle of Go Nutz and the disastrous recording of that album, the Wild Romance fell apart, though Dany Lademacher and Freddy Cavalli still played on this album, the last recorded with the "old" Wild Romance.

On the Dutch album chart, the album reached #26 on 20 September 1980, and stayed on the chart for five weeks.

== Track listing ==
No.	Title	Length
1.	"Dynamite"
2.	"Girl of my Dreams"
3.	"Time to Split"
4.	"Keep Playin that Rock 'n' Roll"
5.	"Outside Lookin' In"
6.	"Propaganda"
7.	"All the Girls 're Crazy"
8.	"Brickyard Blues"
9.	"Workin' Girl"
10.	"Voices"
11.	"Blew My Cool"

== Personnel ==
- Herman Brood - piano, keyboards, vocals
- Freddy Cavalli - bass
- Dany Lademacher - guitar
- Cees Meerman - drums
