= Jungle Jive =

Single by Luv'

from the album Sincerely Yours
- Released: March 1991
- Recorded: 1990
- Genre: Pop
- Length: 3:23
- Label: RCA Records/BMG
- Songwriters: G.Thé, Jacques Zwart (a.k.a. E. Mergency), Marga Scheide
- Producer: Jacques Zwart (a.k.a. E. Mergency)

Luv' singles chronology
"Hasta Mañana" (1990)	"Jungle Jive" (1991)	"The Last Song" (1991)

"Jungle Jive" is the twenty-second single by Dutch girl group Luv', released in 1991 by RCA Records/BMG. It appears on their 1991 album Sincerely Yours.

== Song history ==
The second semester of 1990 saw changes to Luv's destiny. First of all, Michelle Gold was replaced by Carina Lemoine. Then, the trio had a new record company (RCA Records). Finally, after songs influenced by the Stock Aitken Waterman productions, the trio concentrated its efforts on a more eclectic music style (with elements of flamenco, Jazz, Rap, Dance, and Pop). Marga Scheide's partner, the producer Jacques Zwart (a.k.a. E.Mergency), was involved in Luv's new repertoire. He recruited famous session musicians in the Dutch music scene (like Bert Meulendijk, Eddie Conard, Hans Jansen, Lex Bolderdijk, Omar Dupree and Ton op 't Hof) for the recording of the group's new material.

The Spanish-themed song "Hasta Mañana" (1990) was the first single of the new Luv's formation to be released by RCA but failed to break into the hit lists. The follow-up single, "Jungle Jive" (with its Exotica and Swing parts), composed by Scheide and Zwart, was not successful as well. Before the release of this song, Luv' performed in Dubai to support the Dutch troops involved in the first Gulf War, following the examples of Marlene Dietrich, Marilyn Monroe, Raquel Welch or Kylie Minogue who had entertained soldiers.

== Commercial performance ==
The single failed to break into the charts.

== Track listing and release ==
Jungle Jive was released by RCA/BMG Ariola Benelux B.V in March 1991.

7" Vinyl

- Side A: He's My Guy - 3:23
- Side B: Sentimental Fool - 4:17

CD Single

- 1. He's My Guy - 3:23
- 2. Sentimental Fool - 4:17
