= Diana van Berlo =

Dutch singer

- Also known as: Sharon Vice (in the beginning of her career)
- Born: 6 July 1966 (age 60); Helmond, Netherlands
- Origin: Nederlands
- Genres: Pop
- Occupation: Singer
- Years active: 1986–present
- Labels: High Fashion/Dureco, RCA/BMG
- Website: www.dianavanberlo.nl

Diana van Berlo (born 6 July 1966 in Helmond, Netherlands) is a Dutch pop singer. She was a member of the girl group Luv' from 1989 to 1992. She scored with the female formation a Dutch and Flemish Top 30 hit with the single "Welcome to My Party" as well as another minor hit song "He's My Guy". After Luv' had disbanded in 1992, she formed with Carina Lemoine the short-lived girl duo Lady's D.C. In recent years, she has been a backing singer and has sung in dinner shows.

== Early years ==
Diana van Berlo started a semi professional singing career in the 1980s in Dutch clubs using the stage name Sharon Vice. She took part in local talent shows. She worked in accountancy in a transport company before joining Luv'.

== Luv' (1989–1992) ==
In late 1988 there were speculations about a reunion of Luv's original line-up (Patty Brard, José Hoebee and Marga Scheide). The British hitmakers Stock Aitken Waterman were planned to produce a comeback record. However, this project didn't come off. Moreover, Patty and José didn't want to be part of the trio anymore (but they would later participate in two reunions). Marga was the only member to carry on. Assisted by her partner (producer Jacques Zwart), she recruited two girls to launch a renewed version of the group: Michelle Gold (replaced by Carina Lemoine in the summer of 1990) and Diana van Berlo.

The new Luv' act recorded an EP entitled For You mainly supervised by English producer Nigel Wright. The dance-pop songs on this recording were inspired by the sound of PWL (Kylie Minogue, Mel & Kim, Bananarama or Rick Astley). Four tracks were taken from the EP to be released as singles (among them "Welcome to My Party", a Top 30 hit in the Netherlands and Flanders (Belgium). Diana's first live show with Luv' took place in a discothèque (Four Roses) in Hilversum with special guests (including John de Mol) on 10 September 1989. Soon after, Diana and her colleagues were involved with other Dutch girl groups (including Frizzle Sizzle and Mai Tai) in the All Stars project to help Third World children with the single "Star Maker".

In 1991, the album Sincerely Yours (including the minor hit single "He's My Guy") was released but didn't top the charts at all.

Though the new formation wasn't as successful as the original one, the trio extensively toured the club circuit and often performed on TV (they even appeared in a special (Luv' in Thailand) in 1991). Their busy schedule included a special performance in Dubai to support the Dutch troops during the Gulf War.

== Post Luv' career ==
After Luv' disbanded in late 1992, Diana teamed up with Carina Lemoine to form a female pop duo: Lady's D.C. The two singers recorded in 1994 a single ("Now Is the Time") released by RCA/BMG. They rapidly ended their professional relationship. Then Diana went solo. She later became a backing vocalist for other Dutch acts. She has recently taken part in "4 acts", a music and comedy show. In 2009, she was involved in a dinner show Theater Op Het Water in Rotterdam on a boat ("De Ameland") on the Meuse. In addition to her artistic activities, she currently works in Helmond at Fashionwheels, a warehousing and distribution company dedicated to the fashion industry.

== Discography ==
with Luv'

- For You (Dureco/High Fashion, 1989)
- Sincerely Yours (RCA/BMG, 1991)

with Lady's D.C.

- "Now Is the Time" (RCA/BMG, 1994)
