= Freeze (album) =

Studio album by Herman Brood & His Wild Romance
- Released: 1989
- Studio: Friends Studio, Amsterdam
- Genre: Rock and roll, blues
- Label: CBS
- Producer: The Wild Romance

Herman Brood & His Wild Romance chronology
Hooks (1989)	Freeze (1989)	Live (1992)

Freeze is the tenth studio album by Dutch rock and roll and blues group Herman Brood & His Wild Romance. The album reached No. 63 on the Dutch album chart on 3 November 1990, and stayed on the chart for 5 weeks. Brood, who had just won the 1989 Popprijs, one of the highest Dutch awards for popular music, recorded Freeze with the help of Clarence Clemons of the E Street Band and Tejano accordion player Flaco Jiménez. Lack of success for this album leads Brood to stop touring.

== Track listing ==
No.	Title	Writer(s)	Length
1.	"Blue Ice Moon"	Brood, Roy Bakker	3:31
2.	"Crackin' Up"	Brood, David Hollestelle Jr.	4:26
3.	"The Talkin'"	Brood	3:59
4.	"Break Away"	Brood, David Hollestelle Jr.	4:29
5.	"Lie & Cheat"	Brood	2:17
6.	"Boys in Black"	Brood, Roy Bakker, David Hollestelle Jr., Ivo Severijns	1:02
7.	"Beefin' It Up"	Brood, Ivo Severijns	4:21
8.	"Cat Smoke"	David Hollestelle Jr.	2:13
9.	"Legal in Amsterdam"	Brood, David Hollestelle Jr.	4:05
10.	"Johnny"	Brood	1:19
11.	"He'll Have to Go"	Brood	1:01
12.	"Cripple (Without You)"	Brood, David Hollestelle Jr.	2:49
13.	"On Top of You"	Brood, David Hollestelle Jr.	2:27
14.	"Forever"	Erik Walet, Mads Nordheim	2:07
15.	"Blue Moon"	Richard Rodgers, Lorenz Hart	1:00
16.	"It Ain't the Gun"	Brood, David Hollestelle Jr.	5:09

== Personnel ==
Herman Brood and his Wild Romance

- Herman Brood – piano, keyboards, vocals
- Roy Bakker – drums
- Ivo Severijns – bass
- David Hollestelle Jr. – guitar

with:

- Clarence Clemons – saxophone
- Flaco Jiménez – accordion
- The Bombita's (Lies Schilp, Inge Bonthond, Robbie Schmitz, Perla den Boer) – backing vocals

Technical

- Koos van Dijk – executive producer
- John Tilly – engineer
- Herman Brood – design
- Alex de Groot – photography
