= Street (Herman Brood & His Wild Romance album) =

Studio album by Herman Brood & His Wild Romance
- Released: 1977
- Studio: Soundpush Studios, Blaricum, The Netherlands
- Genre: Rock and roll, blues
- Length: 36:08
- Label: Ariola
- Producer: Jan Schuurman

Herman Brood & His Wild Romance chronology
Street (1977)	Shpritsz (1978)

Street is the first studio album by Dutch rock and roll and blues group Herman Brood & His Wild Romance, and the start of a solo career for Herman Brood, who had earlier toured and recorded with Cuby and the Blizzards and made one record with the short-lived band Stud. Commercially, it was not very successful: on the Dutch album chart, it reached #30 on 28 May 1977 and stayed on the chart for seven weeks. The record was re-released on CD in 1995 by Sony BMG/Ariola.

== Track listing ==
No.	Title	Writer(s)	Length
1.	"Street"	Herman Brood	2:45
2.	"Turn It On"	Harry Rijnbergen	5:22
3.	"Syrup"	Hugo Sinzheimer, Erik Strack	3:35
4.	"Back in Your Love"	Herman Brood, Gerrit Veen, Pé Hawinkels	3:16
5.	"Crocodile (The Penthouse)"	Herman Brood, Pé Hawinkels	4:15
6.	"Pop It"	Herman Brood	7:54
7.	"Romanza di Cavalli"	Jan Akkerman	1:23
8.	"Spine Pain"	Herman Brood	2:00
9.	"One More Dose (Lonely Pain Part 2)"	Herman Brood, Pé Hawinkels, Hugo Sinzheimer	4:03
10.	"Feels Like Love"	Herman Brood	1:22

== Personnel ==
- Herman Brood – piano, keyboards, vocals
- Jan Akkerman – guitar
- Erik de Zwaan & Rob Ten Bokum – guitar, slide guitar, harmonica, vocals
- Margriet Eshuis – vocals
- Sjoukje van 't Spijker – vocals
- Josée van Iersel – vocals
- Gerrit Veen – bass
- Peter Walrecht – drums
- Bertus Borgers – saxophone
- Frans Mijts – trumpet
- Nippy Noya – conga

Technical

- Herman Brood – design
- Anton Corbijn, Henk Venema, John Timmer, Philip Pelgrom – photography
