= Hasta Mañana (Luv' song) =

Single by Luv'

from the album Sincerely Yours
- Released: October 1990
- Recorded: 1990
- Genre: Pop, dance
- Length: 3:57
- Label: RCA Records/BMG
- Songwriters: Jacques Zwart (a.k.a. E. Mergency) and D. Force
- Producer: Jacques Zwart (a.k.a. E. Mergency)

Luv' singles chronology
"Hit-Medley" (1990)	"Hasta Mañana" (1990)	"Jungle Jive" (1991)

"Hasta Mañana" is the twenty first single by Dutch girl group Luv', released in 1990 by RCA Records/BMG. It appears on their 1991 album Sincerely Yours. It involved Luv's new member: Carina Lemoine (who replaced Michelle Gold).

== Song history ==
In June 1990, Michelle Gold left Luv'.She was replaced by Carina Lemoine, a 21-year-old singer who had started her recording career when she was a teenager. This change in the group's line-up coincided with a new record deal.The trio left indeed Dureco/High Fashion Music for RCA Records/BMG and chose another kind of repertoire. After the 1989/1990 singles (inspired by the Stock Aitken Waterman style) which failed to deliver a real mainstream success, the new formation recorded songs that wove elements of flamenco, Latin musical styles, and Jazz into its dance-pop sound. The majority of these new tracks were composed and produced by Jacques Zwart (a.k.a. E.Mergency), Marga Scheide's partner.

"Hasta Mañana" is the first song from this new material to be released as a single by RCA. This dance-pop composition with Spanish guitar elements failed to top the charts. Despite its lack of success in the hit lists in the 1990s, Luv' toured extensively in the Netherlands and Belgium and often performed on TV.

== Commercial performance ==
The single failed to break into the charts.

== Track listing and release ==
Hasta Mañana was released by RCA/BMG Ariola Benelux B.V in October 1990.

7" Vinyl

- Side One: Hasta Mañana (Hé Kanjer!) - 3:57

Written by E.Mergency/E.Mergency - D.Force

- Side Two: Hasta Mañana (Hé Guapo!) - 3:57

Written by E.Mergency/E.Mergency - D.Force

CD Single

- 1. Hasta Mañana / Extended Version - 5:31
- 2. Hasta Mañana / Club Mix - 6:00
- 3. Hasta Mañana (Hé Kanjer!) / Single Version - 3:57

Written by E.Mergency/E.Mergency - D.Force
