= Shpritsz =

Studio album by Herman Brood & His Wild Romance
- Released: 1978-05-19
- Recorded: 1977–1978
- Studio: Relight Studio, Hilvarenbeek, Netherlands
- Genre: Rock and roll, blues
- Length: 37:25
- Label: Ariola
- Producer: Herman Brood & His Wild Romance, Robin Freeman

Herman Brood & His Wild Romance chronology
Street (1977)	Shpritsz (1978)	Cha Cha (1978)

Singles from Shpritsz
- 1. "Rock & Roll Junkie" Released: 1977; 2. "Saturday Night" Released: 1978

Shpritsz (the name derives from a colloquial German word for "syringe") is the second studio album by Dutch rock and roll and blues group Herman Brood & His Wild Romance. The album produced two singles. The first, "Rock & Roll Junkie," did not chart. The second, "Saturday Night," charted in Europe and the United States. On the Dutch album chart, the album reached No. 8 on 3 June 1978, and stayed on the chart for 28 weeks. It was certified gold in 1978, and platinum in 1980.

Shpritsz was re-released on CD in 2000 by RCA/Ariola. In a 2008 poll by Muziekkrant OOR, the leading Dutch music magazine, Shpritsz was voted the fourth-best Dutch album of all time.

== Track listing ==
No.	Title	Writer(s)	Length
1.	"Saturday Night"	Brood, Dany Lademacher	3:42
2.	"Dope Sucks"	Brood, Dany Lademacher	2:06
3.	"One"	Brood, Pé Hawinkels	1:54
4.	"Doin' It"	Brood	2:39
5.	"Champagne (& Wine)"	Roy Johnson, Otis Redding, Alan Walder	3:31
6.	"Back (In Y'r Love)"	Brood, Pé Hawinkels	1:48
7.	"Hit"	Brood, Pé Hawinkels, Dany Lademacher	2:47
8.	"R & Roll Junkie"	Brood	2:46
9.	"Never Enough"	Rommert Boonstra, Brood, Hugo Sinzheimer, Erik Strack	2:31
10.	"Pain"	Rommert Boonstra, Brood	1:52
11.	"Get Lost"	Brood	3:12
12.	"Hot-Talk"	Hugo Sinzheimer, Erik Strack	1:44
13.	"Prisoners"	Brood, Pé Hawinkels	1:40
14.	"Doreen"	Brood, Dany Lademacher, Langenbach	2:32
15.	"Skid Row"	Brood, Pé Hawinkels, Gerrit Veen	2:35

== Singles ==
"Rock & Roll Junkie" was released (with "Street" on the B-side), but never charted. "Saturday Night" was released as a single (with "Phony" and "Pop" on the B-side); it peaked at No. 17 in the Dutch Top 50 on 16 September 1978, and was on the charts for eleven weeks.

In the United States, "Saturday Night" was released as a single in 1979, and rose to No. 35 in the Billboard Hot 100; the single is referred to in the Billboard charts as "Saturdaynight."

== Personnel ==
Herman Brood and his Wild Romance

- Herman Brood – piano, keyboards, vocals
- Dany Lademacher – guitar
- Freddy Cavalli – bass
- Cees "Ani" Meerman – drums
- Bertus Borgers – saxophone

with:

- Dee Dee Dekkers, Josee van Iersel – vocals
- Robert Jan Stips – "synthetic panic" synthesizer on "Saturday Night"
- Floor Van Zutphen, Monica Tjen A Kwoei – female vocals
- Bert Jansen – blues harp on "Hit" and "Pain"

Technical

- Robin Freeman – sound engineer
- Pierre Geoffroy Chateau – co-engineer
- Dick van der Meyden, Sylvia Wiggers – cover design
- Anton Corbijn – photography
