= Cha Cha (film) =

Cha-Cha
- Directed by: Herbert Curiel
- Written by: Herman Brood; Herbert Curiel
- Produced by: Marcel Kerkhoff
- Starring: Herman Brood; Nina Hagen; Lene Lovich; Les Chappell
- Edited by: Rob van Steensel
- Music by: Herman Brood & His Wild Romance; Nina Hagen; Lene Lovich
- Distributed by: Concorde Film
- Release date: 13 December 1979
- Running time: 99 minutes
- Country: Netherlands
- Languages: Dutch; English; German

Cha Cha is a 1979 Dutch film written by Herman Brood and directed by Herbert Curiel. It stars Herman Brood, Nina Hagen, Lene Lovich and Les Chappell. Released on December 13, 1979, the film is a story of a bank robber who is trying to change his life and become a rock star. It takes place in Amsterdam's punk and new wave scene. All characters in the film have the same names as the actors. Cha Cha features musical performances by the main actors. The soundtrack for the film was released by CBS and Ariola Records. The picture has since then become a cult film.
