= Herman Brood =

Dutch musician, painter, actor, poet and media personality (1946–2001)

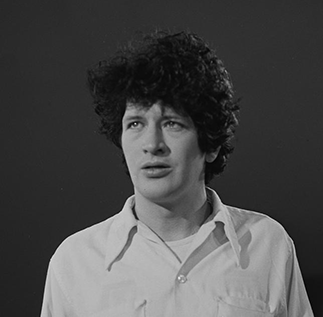
- Brood in 1979

Background information
- Also known as: Rock 'n' roll junkie
- Born: Hermanus Brood; 5 November 1946; Zwolle, Netherlands
- Died: 11 July 2001 (aged 54) Amsterdam, Netherlands
- Genres: Rock
- Occupations: Musician, painter, actor, poet
- Instruments: Vocals, guitar, piano
- Years active: 1964–2001
- Label: RCA Records
- Website: Official site

Hermanus "Herman" Brood (Dutch pronunciation: [ɦɛrˈmaːnʏs ˈɦɛrmɑm ˈbroːt]; 5 November 1946 – 11 July 2001) was a Dutch musician, painter, actor and poet. As a musician he achieved artistic and commercial success in the 1970s and 1980s, and was called "the greatest and only Dutch rock 'n' roll star". Later in life he started a successful career as a painter.

Known for his hedonistic lifestyle of "sex, drugs and rock 'n' roll", Brood was an enfant terrible and a cultural figure whose suicide by jumping from a hotel roof, apparently influenced by a failure to kick his drug and alcohol habit, strengthened his controversial status; according to a poll organised to celebrate fifty years of Dutch popular music, it was the most significant event in its history.

== Musical career ==
Herman Brood was born in Zwolle, and started playing the piano at age 12. He founded beat band The Moans in 1964, which would later become Long Tall Ernie and the Shakers. Brood was asked to play with Cuby and the Blizzards, but was removed by management when the record company discovered he used drugs. For a number of years Brood was in jail (for dealing LSD), or abroad, and had a number of short-term engagements (with The Studs, the Flash & Dance Band, Vitesse).

In 1976, Brood started his own group, Herman Brood & His Wild Romance (and started working with photographer Anton Corbijn), initially with Ferdi Karmelk (guitar), Gerrit Veen (bass), Peter Walrecht (drums), and Ellen Piebes and Ria Ruiters (vocals). They played the club and bar circuit, first in Groningen (the northeasternmost province of the Netherlands). In 1977 the band released their first album, Street.

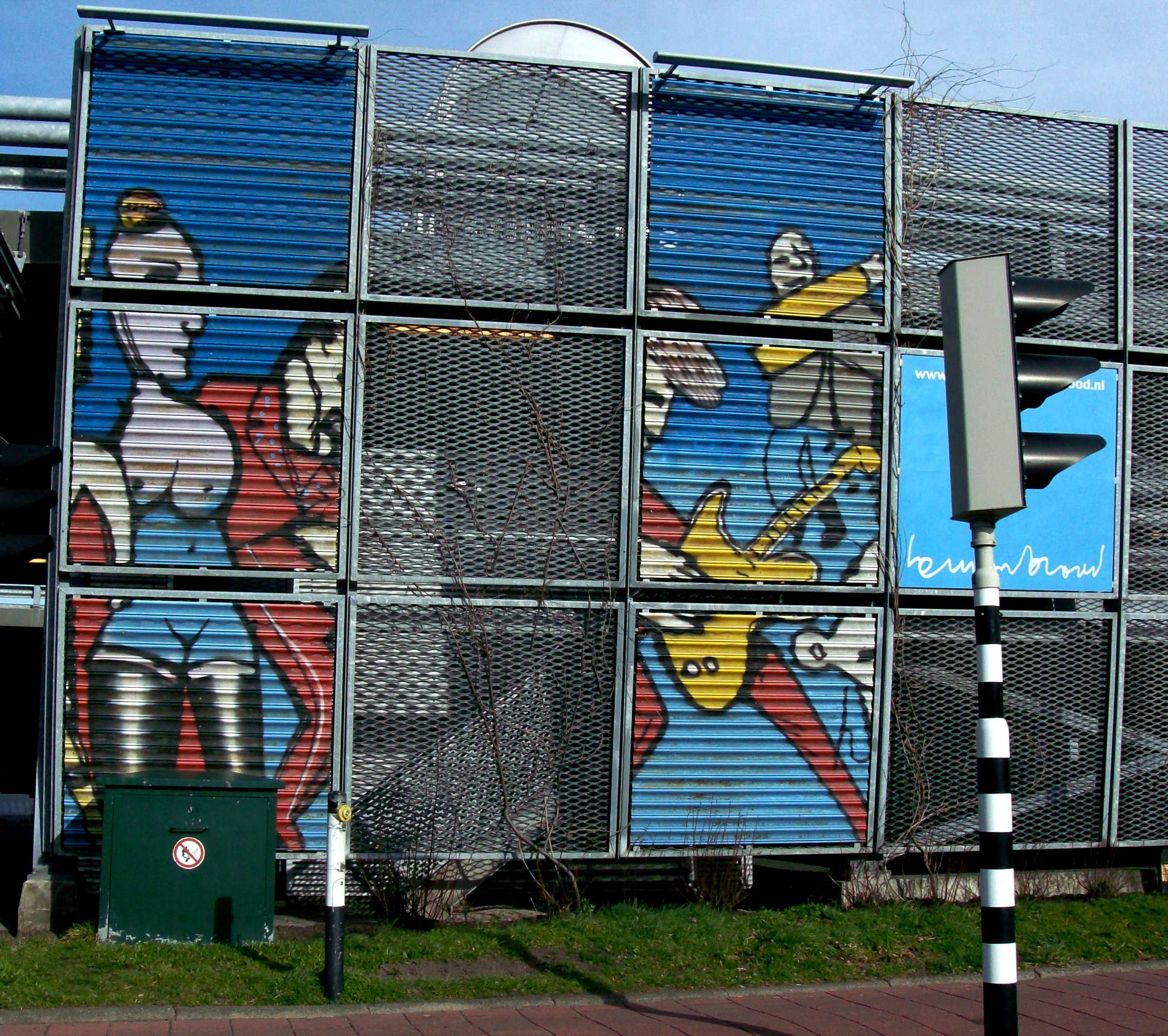
Murals by Brood on a parking garage in Leidschendam

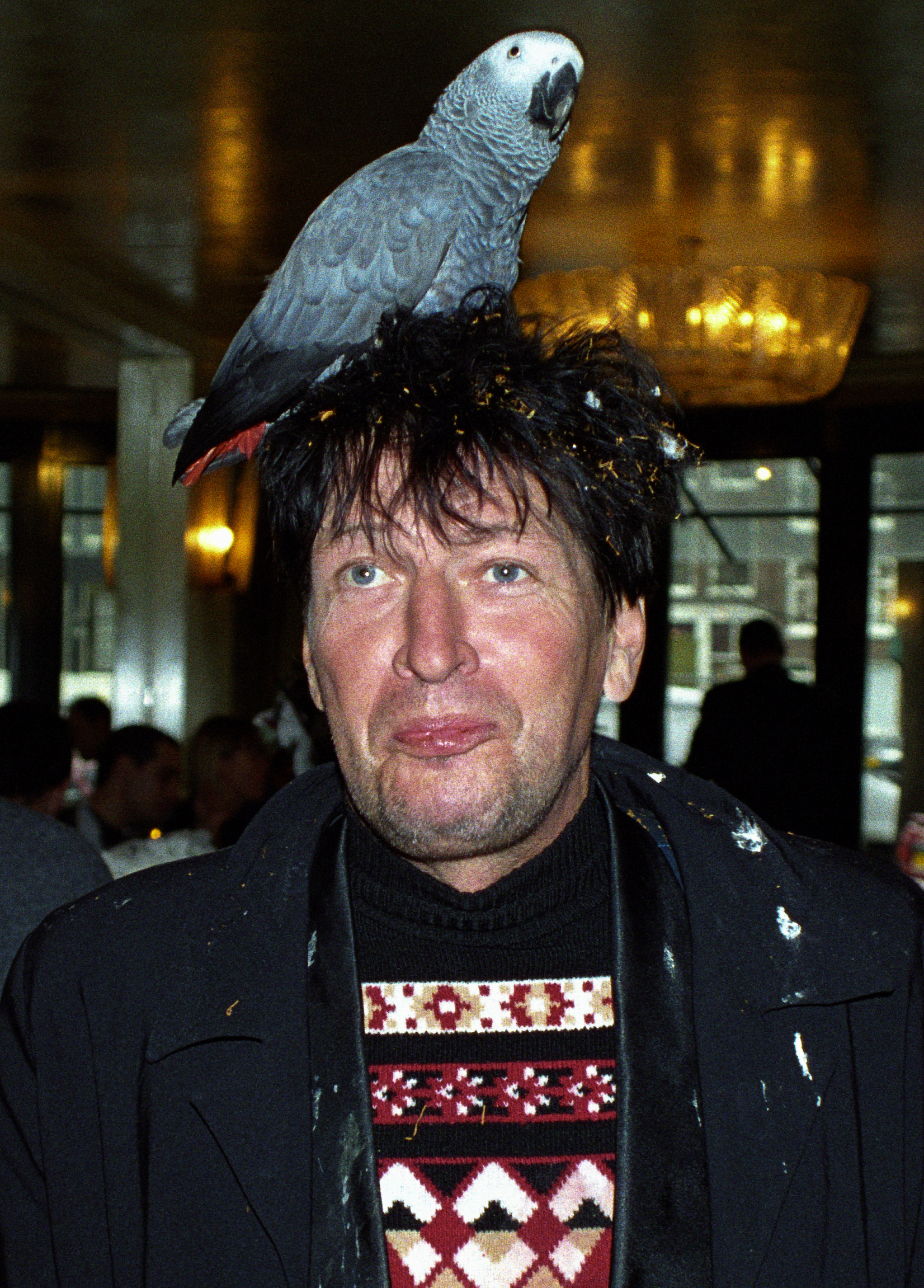
Brood in 2000

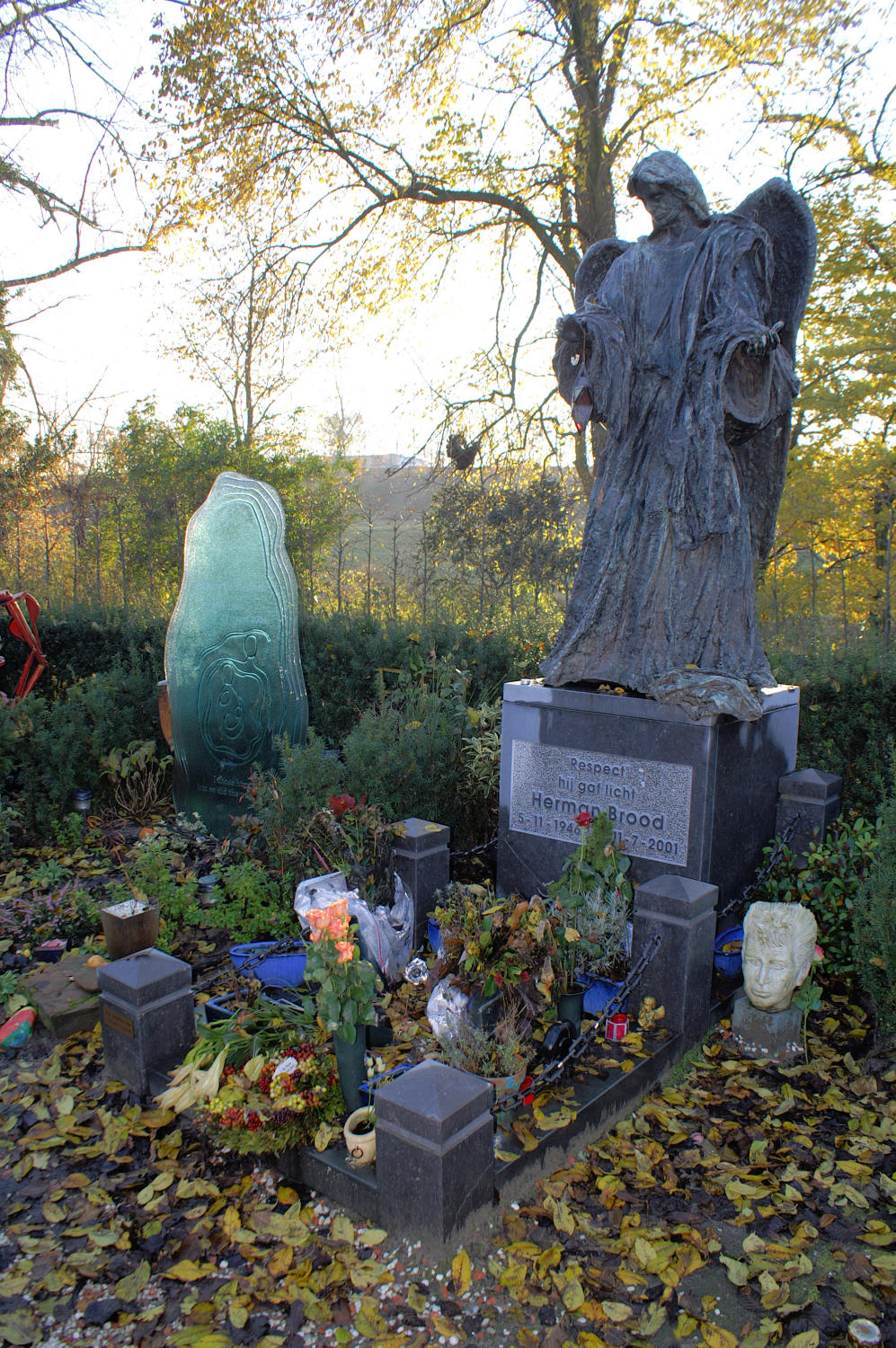
Brood's grave at Zorgvlied

They are still best known for their second album, Shpritsz—a play on the German word Spritze for syringe—from 1978. This album contained Brood anthems like "Dope Sucks," "Rock & Roll Junkie," and their first Dutch hit single, "Saturday Night." The band went through many personnel changes over the years; the best-known formation was Freddy Cavalli (bass), Dany Lademacher (guitar) (later replaced with David Hollestelle), and Cees 'Ani' Meerman (drums). A frequent contributor was Bertus Borgers (saxophone).

Brood's outspoken statements in the press about sex and drug use brought him into the Dutch public arena even more than his music. He was romantically involved with the German singer Nina Hagen, with whom he appeared in the 1979 film Cha-Cha. He is reputed to be the subject of her song "Herrmann Hiess Er" (English title "Herrmann Was His Name") from the 1979 Unbehagen album, a song about a drug addict. Brood relished the media attention and became the most famous hard drug user in the Netherlands. "It is quite common for an artist to use drugs, but not for him to tell everybody. I admit that it scared me that my popularity could make people start using drugs," he once said in an interview.

In the summer of 1979, Brood tried to enter the American market, with support from Ariola's US division, which was attempting to expand into rock music. Following on the success of Shpritsz, the band was booked as a support act for The Kinks and The Cars, playing in auditoriums; "Herman Brood and His Wild Romance Tour Cha Cha '79" headlined in New York's (Bottom Line) and Los Angeles' (Roxy). A re-recorded version of "Saturday Night" peaked at number 35 in the Billboard Hot 100, but the big break Brood hoped for didn't happen. When he returned to the Netherlands in October 1979, his band had begun to fall apart, and soon his popularity went downhill. Go Nutz, the album Brood had recorded while in the States, and the movie Cha-Cha, which finally premiered in December 1979, were considered artistic failures, even though Go Nutz produced three charting singles in the Netherlands and the Cha Cha soundtrack attained platinum status. The 1980 album Wait a Minute... was a minor success, but the follow-up albums Modern Times Revive (1981) and Frisz & Sympatisz (1982) failed to make the Dutch album charts.

Brood continued to record throughout the 1980s and had a few hits—a top-10 single, "Als Je Wint" with Henny Vrienten, and a minor hit with a reggae song, "Tattoo Song," but he spent more and more time on his art work. At the end of the '80s he made a comeback of sorts; Yada Yada (1988), produced by George Kooymans, was well-received, and he toured Germany with a renewed Wild Romance (which saw the return of Dany Lademacher). In 1990, he won the BV Popprijs, one of the highest Dutch awards for popular music, and recorded Freeze with Clarence Clemons of the E Street Band and Tejano accordion player Flaco Jiménez. A live "best of" album, Saturday Night Live, appeared in 1992. His 50th birthday, in 1996, was celebrated with a show at the Paradiso music and cultural center in Amsterdam, and the album (of duets) was released the same year.

== Visual arts career ==
After his career in music, Brood turned to painting and became a well-known character in Amsterdam art circles. His art is best described as pop-art, often very colorful and graffiti-inspired screen prints, and he achieved some commercial success and notoriety by, for instance, creating murals in various public spaces in and around Amsterdam. He continued to remain in the public eye, by appearing in the media and by his cooperation with biographical films such as 1994's Rock'n Roll Junkie.

== Suicide and legacy ==
Toward the end of his life, Brood vowed to abstain from most drugs, reducing his drug use to alcohol and a daily shot of speed ("2 grams per day"). On 11 July 2001, depressed by the failure of his drug rehabilitation program and facing serious medical problems because of his prolonged drug use, he committed suicide by jumping from the roof of the Amsterdam Hilton Hotel at the age of 54. He left a note, stating "Ik heb er geen zin meer in, misschien zie ik jullie nog wel eens. Maak er een mooi feest van." which translates to "I don’t feel like it anymore, maybe I'll see you all again some day. Have a nice party."

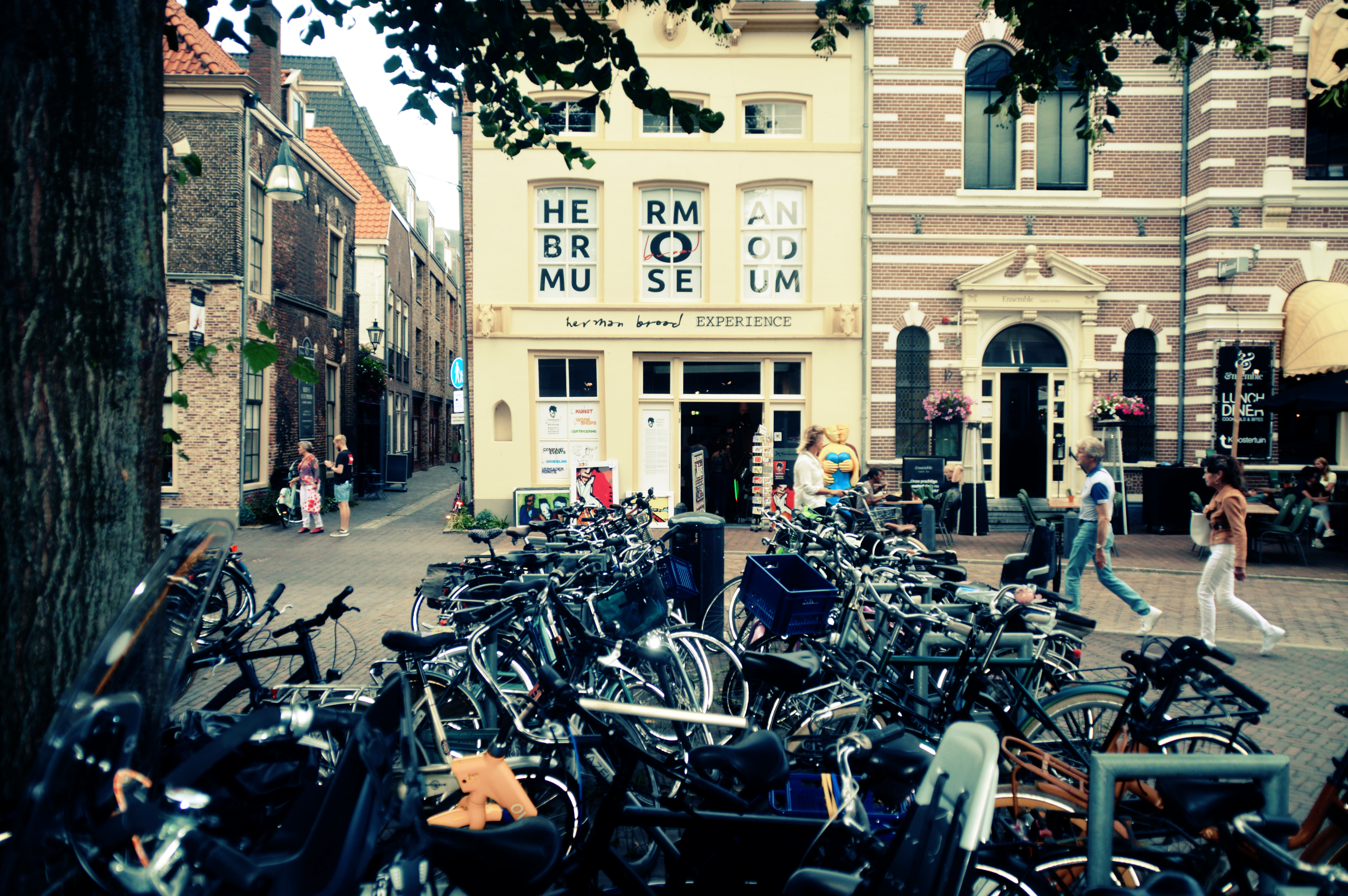
Herman Brood Museum & Experience, Zwolle

Extensively covered by the national media, his cremation took place five days later. Before the cremation, Brood's coffin was driven from the Hilton hotel to Paradiso, Amsterdam, the streets lined with thousands of spectators. A commemorative concert was held in Paradiso, with performances by Hans Dulfer, André Hazes, and Jules Deelder, and the leading Dutch music magazine Muziekkrant OOR devoted an entire issue to him. His ashes were inurned at Zorgvlied cemetery.

Soon after his suicide, Brood's version of "My Way" spent three weeks as number one in the Dutch singles charts; the market value of his art work also increased greatly. A characteristic note is that Brood's paintings had often been targeted by vandals during his life, but after his death they were stolen for their value. His popularity (or notoriety) was confirmed by the fact that his name turned out to be the strongest brand of the year.

When U2 performed in the Netherlands three weeks after Brood's suicide, they paid tribute to him at each of the three shows. They dedicated a version of "Stuck in a Moment You Can't Get Out Of" (written for Michael Hutchence after his death) to him, with Bono singing Brood's "When I Get Home" as an a capella intro.

At the third show in Arnhem they also dedicated their own "Gone" to him and had his version of "My Way" played over the PA as outro music. In the middle of the show Bono delivered an emotional eulogy to Brood before the band performed "In a Little While".

On 5 November 2006 the Groninger Museum opened an exposition devoted to Herman Brood's life and work, comprising paintings, lyrics, and poetry, portraits by photographer Anton Corbijn, a collection of private pictures (from the family album), and concert photos and videos. The exhibition continued until 28 January. It was centered on Herman's atelier (studio) where he created most of his paintings. The atelier had been entirely re-built in the museum. During the 1990s, Herman Brood's studio was located on the second floor of the gallery in the Spuistraat in Amsterdam and has remained untouched since his death.

In 2007 the film Wild Romance, a movie about Brood's life, premiered in the Netherlands, with Brood portrayed by Daniël Boissevain. He continues to inspire other artists: the 2007 album Bluefinger by Black Francis is based on Brood's life and works. A tribute band called the Brood Roosters ("bread toasters") was active in the Netherlands until they split up in early 2009. Another tribute band called Yada Yada is still active in the Netherlands, often appearing with original members of the Wild Romance (Dany Lademacher, Ramon Rambeaux).

In 2010 the Catastrophic Theatre Company collaborated with Frank Black on a rock opera based on the Bluefinger album. The opera's first performance, with Matt Kelly portraying Brood, was on 12 November 2010 in Houston, Texas.

== Discography (albums) ==
- Street (1977)
- Shpritsz (1978)
- Cha Cha (1978)
- Cha Cha (1979, soundtrack for the movie Cha Cha)
- Herman Brood & His Wild Romance (1979, Shpritsz re-release for US market, contains an edited version of Saturday Night)
- Go Nutz (1980)
- Wait a Minute... (1980)
- Modern Times Revive (1981)
- Frisz & Sympatisz (1982)
- The Brood (1984)
- Bühnensucht (1985, live album)
- Yada Yada (1988)
- Hooks (1989)
- Freeze (1990)
- Saturday Night Live! (1992)
- Fresh Poison (1994)
- 50 – The Soundtrack (1996 duets, a tribute album for his 50th birthday)
- Back on the Corner (1999)
- Ciao Monkey (2000)
- My Way – The Hits (2001)
- Final (2006, 3-CD compilation)

== Filmography ==
- Cha-Cha (1979)
- Stadtrand (1987, German movie)
- Zusje (1995) - Bovenbuurman / Upstairs neighbor
- Total Love (2000, Israeli movie) - M.J
- Rock 'N Roll Junkie (1994, documentary)
- Live And More (2003, Concerts from Philipshalle, Düsseldorf 1978 & Musik Hall, Koln 1990 (3DVDBox))
- Wild Romance (2006, scenes from Herman Brood's life)
- Herman Brood Uncut (2006, documentary)
- Kunst begin drrr niet an (2015, 80 min. documentary by Gwen Jansen, DVD, 90% of all screenprints and paintings are made by Herman in the IQ studio between the late 80s until his passing in 2001. Compiled from over 70 hours of footage, produced by Ivo de Lange for iq.nl)
- Unknown Brood (2016, documentary directed by Dennis Alink)

== Literature ==
- Brood, Herman (1996). Liebes Blutbad. Hannover: Revonnah. ISBN 978-3-927715-23-3.
- Eilander, Jan (2005). Rock 'n roll junkie: over Herman Brood. Amsterdam: Prometheus. ISBN 978-90-446-0944-8.
- Uncut. TM. 2006. ISBN 978-90-499-0032-8. Book and DVD.
- Tast, Brigitte; Hans-Juergen Tast (2007). "be bop" – Die Wilhelmshoehe rockt. Disco und Konzerte in der Hoelle. Hildesheim: Gerstenberg. ISBN 978-3-8067-8589-0.
- Brigitte Tast, Hans-Juergen Tast (2009) "be bop" – Rock-Tempel & Nachtasyl – Band 2 zur Legende. Hildesheim: Verlag Gebr. Gerstenberg. ISBN 978-3-8067-8733-7.
- Brigitte Tast, Hans-Jürgen Tast (2016) Herman Brood. Der Ladykiller im "be bop", Schellerten 2015, ISBN 978-3-88842-049-8.
