= Dany Lademacher =

Belgian guitarist (1950–2025)

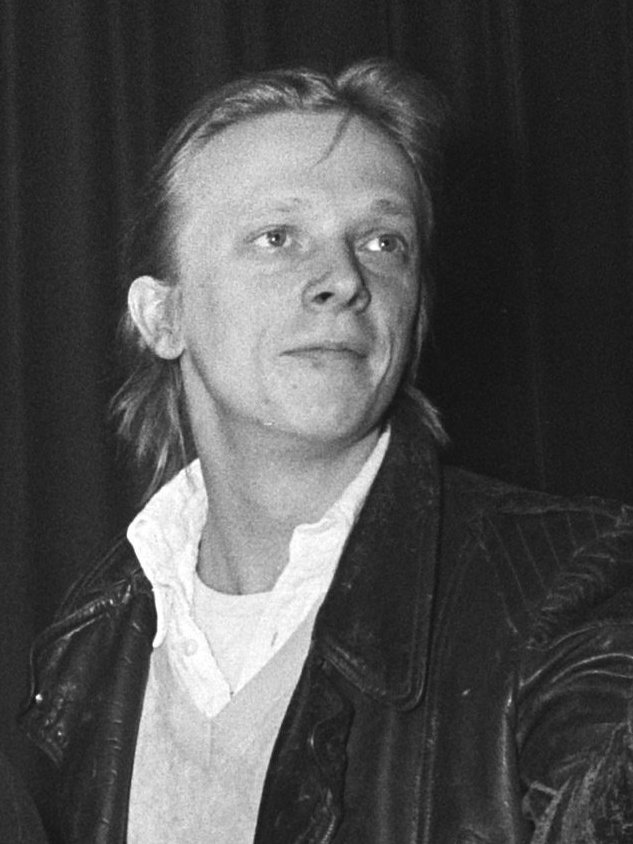
- Lademacher in 1979

Background information
- Born: 17 June 1950; Etterbeek, Belgium
- Died: 3 July 2025 (aged 75); Zaandam, Netherlands
- Genres: Pop rock, hard rock
- Occupation(s): Instrumentalist, songwriter, producer
- Instrument: Guitar
- Years active: 1974–2024
- Formerly of: Herman Brood and his Wild Romance, Vitesse, The Radios

Daniël Germain Jean Lademacher (17 June 1950 – 3 July 2025) was a Belgian guitarist.

Born in Etterbeek, he played in a number of Belgian bands before joining prominent Dutch band Herman Brood and his Wild Romance. He was also a studio and live guitarist for a variety of artists, including T.U.S.H., Gerritsen & Van Dijk and I Travel.

== Kleptomania ==
Founded in 1968 by Charlie Deraedemaeker (bass), Francis Goya (guitar) and singer Lou Deprijck, Kleptomania was a cult Belgian rock band which underwent several line up changes, Lademacher joining in 1969 and being voted best guitarist in Belgium three years running. Kleptomania's debut single Kept Woman sounded somewhat similar to Black Sabbath, Kleptomania's popularity peaked in summer 1970 when the band opened for The Wallace Collection at Puzzle P Festival in Brussels, and shared the bill with Badfinger at the Bilzen Rock & Jazz Festival.

== Herman Brood and his Wild Romance ==
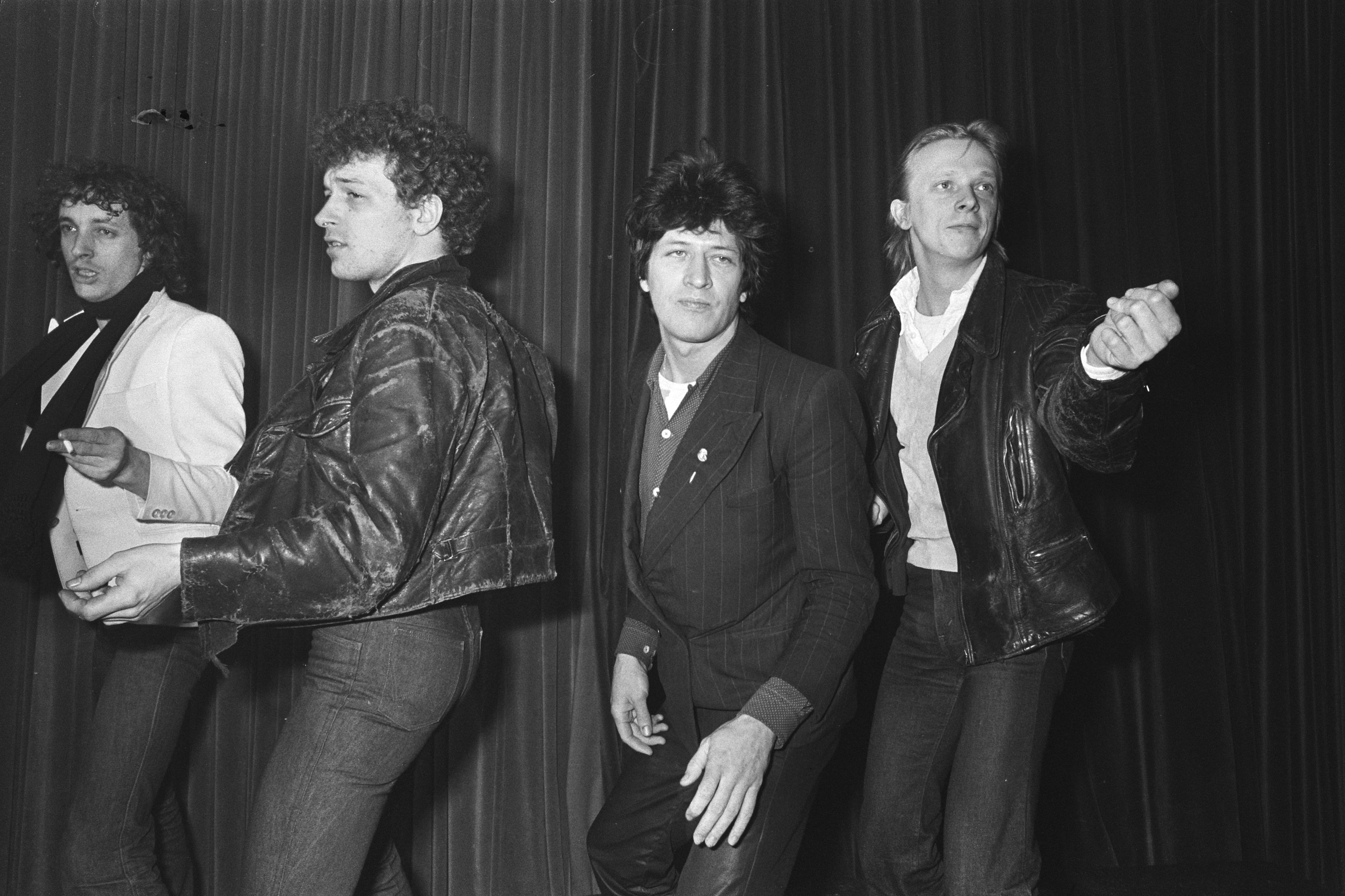
L.t.R.: Ani Meerman, Freddie Cavalli, Herman Brood and Dany Lademacher (Wild Romance, 1979)

Lademacher recounted in his autobiographical Wild Romance--Een fijne hel how he, a young man from Brussels, fell into Brood's rock and roll lifestyle, complete with sex and drugs. Writing songs initially came easily, with Brood writing lyrics and Lademacher the music. He co-wrote the singles Saturday Night and Never Be Clever. But by 1981 he had had enough; he said that Brood's liquor and drugs habit (Brood switched from speed to heroin) made working with him impossible. For six years he played with the bands Innersleeve and Vitesse.

In 1981, he won an Edison award for his album Dany Lademachers Innersleeve. In 1987 Brood asked him to return, which he did. They recorded three albums (including Yada Yada), but by 1989 Brood, lacking commercial success, stopped performing.

== The Radios ==
After his second parting with Herman Brood, Lademacher joined the Belgian pop band The Radios which had several hit singles in the Netherlands and Belgium. Their single She Goes Nana became an international hit.

== Producer ==
Lademacher was also active as producer. In 1981, he produced the album Black Out by The Kids, which included the hit There Will Be No Next Time. He was also the producer of the album New Lines by Machiavel, with the hit single Fly.

== Death ==
Lademacher died on 3 July 2025, at the age of 75.
