= Greatest Hits (1990 Luv' album) =

Album by Luv'

Greatest hits album by Luv'
- Released: April 1990
- Recorded: 1977–1979
- Genre: Pop; disco
- Length: 42:38
- Label: Mercury/Phonogram
- Producer: Hans van Hemert

Luv' chronology
For You (1989)	Greatest Hits (1990)	Sincerely Yours (1991)

Greatest Hits is a compilation album by Dutch girl group Luv' released by Mercury Records/Phonogram Records. It is the CD version of their 1979 Greatest Hits album which came out ten years earlier, including a bonus track: "Luv' Hitpack". It features hit singles scored in the charts between 1977 and 1979: "My Man", "U.O.Me", "You're the Greatest Lover", "Trojan Horse", "Casanova" and "Eeny Meeny Miny Moe". These songs originate from their first and second studio albums, With Luv' (1978) and Lots of Luv' (1979). The Phonogram years were the group's most successful ones in terms of chart performance as Luv' reached the Top 10 in a dozen of countries in the late 1970s.

== Background ==
In 1989, Luv' was reformed with a line-up different from the original one. Meanwhile, Phonogram Records, the group's first label which held the copyright on the albums With Luv' (1978) and Lots of Luv' (1979) and the singles taken from them, decided to release a CD compilation. The record company chose a track listing close to a previous Greatest Hits (1979) LP that came out ten years earlier when the original Luv' trio was active.

A bonus song was added and released as a single: "Luv' Hitpack", a medley produced by Peter Slaghuis (a famous remixer of the European dance scene known thanks to his project Hithouse in the late 1980s).

== Track listing ==
All tracks written by Hans van Hemert and Piet Souer under the pseudonym 'Janschen & Janschens'.

1. "You're the Greatest Lover" – 2:50
  - Taken from the album With Luv' (1978)
2. " Shoes Off (Boots On)" – 3:06
  - Taken from the album Lots of Luv' (1979)
3. "Louis je t'adore" – 3:40
  - Taken from the album With Luv' (1978)
4. "Casanova" – 3:50
  - Taken from the album Lots of Luv'
5. "D.J" – 3:20
  - B-side of "Casanova", taken from the album Lots of Luv' (1979)
6. "If You Love Me" – 2:34
  - Taken from the album Lots of Luv' (1979)
7. "I Like Sugar Candy Kisses" – 3:36
  - Taken from the album Lots of Luv' (1979)
8. "Don't Let Me Down" – 2:35
  - B-side of My Man
9. "Trojan Horse" – 3:23
  - Taken from the German version of With Luv' (1978)
10. "Marcellino" – 3:15
  - Taken from the album Lots of Luv' (1979)
11. "I.M.U.R" – 3:35
  - B-side of "Eeny Meeny Miny Moe", taken from the album Lots of Luv' (1979)
12. "My Man" – 3:05
  - Taken from the album With Luv' (1978)
13. "Sugar Babe" – 2:45
  - Taken from the album With Luv' (1978)
14. "Who Do You Wanna Be" – 3:44
  - Taken from the album With Luv' (1978)
15. "U.O.Me" – 2:55
  - Taken from the album With Luv' (1978)
16. "Eeny Meeny Miny Moe" – 2:54
  - Taken from the album Lots of Luv' (1979)
17. "Don Juanito De Carnaval" – 3:13
  - Taken from the album With Luv' (1978)
18. "Everybody's Shakin' Hands on Broadway" – 3:24
  - Taken from the album With Luv' (1978)
19. "Luv' Hitpack" – 4:30

== Personnel ==
- José Hoebee – vocals
- Patty Brard – vocals
- Marga Scheide – vocals

Production

- Hans van Hemert – producer, songwriter
- Piet Souer – conductor/arranger
- Gert Van Hoeyen – digital remastering
- Peter Slaghuis – remix on track 19

== Single release ==
#	Singles	Date
1.	"Luv' Hitpack"	1989
