= Greatest Hits (1979 Luv' album) =

Greatest hits album by Luv'
- Released: 1979
- Recorded: 1977–1979
- Genre: Pop, disco
- Length: 42:38
- Label: Philips Records/Phonogram Records
- Producer: Hans van Hemert

Luv' chronology
True Luv' (1979)	Greatest Hits (1979)	Forever Yours (1980)

Greatest Hits is a compilation album by Dutch girl group Luv' by Philips/Phonogram Records. It was rush-released in 1979 a few weeks after the formation had left Philips to sign a record deal with the labels CNR/Carrere Records. It features hit singles scored in the charts between 1977 and 1979: "My Man", "U.O.Me", "You're the Greatest Lover", "Trojan Horse", "Casanova" and "Eeny Meeny Miny Moe". These songs were originally released in their first and second studio albums, With Luv' (1978) and Lots of Luv' (1979). The Philips/Phonogram years were the group's most successful ones in terms of chart performance.

== Album history ==
Soon after Luv's transfer to CNR/Carrere Records, Phonogram Records, the group's first label, decided to counterattack by releasing a compilation. In 1979, the Dutch girl trio had become popular in a short time (two years only after its debut) in Benelux, German-speaking countries, Denmark, South Africa and New Zealand. Hit singles like "You're the Greatest Lover" and "Trojan Horse" were million sellers. The female group was 'Holland's best export act' and thus received the 'Conamus Export Prize'.

The Greatest Hits album features the song "Who Do You Wanna Be" (originally released in Luv's first LP). It was only available in the Netherlands without the consent of Luv' producer Hans van Hemert.

== Track listing ==
All songs by Hans van Hemert and Piet Souer under the pseudonym 'Janschen & Janschens'.

=== Side A ===
1. "You're the Greatest Lover" – 2:50
  - Taken from the album With Luv' (1978)
2. "Shoes Off (Boots On)" – 3:06
  - Taken from the album Lots of Luv' (1979)
3. "Louis je t'adore" – 3:40
  - Taken from the album With Luv' (1978)
4. "Casanova" – 3:50
  - Taken from the album Lots of Luv' (1979)
5. "D.J" – 3:20
  - B-side of "Casanova", taken from the album Lots of Luv' (1979)
6. "If You Love Me" – 2:34
  - Taken from the album Lots of Luv' (1979)
7. "I Like Sugar Candy Kisses" – 3:36
  - Taken from the album Lots of Luv' (1979)
8. "Don't Let Me Down" – 2:35
  - B-side of "My Man"

=== Side B ===
1. "Trojan Horse" – 3:23
  - Taken from the German version of With Luv' (1978)
2. "Marcellino" – 3:15
  - Taken from the album Lots of Luv' (1979)
3. "I.M.U.R" – 3:35
  - B-side of "Eeny Meeny Miny Moe", taken from the album Lots of Luv' (1979)
4. "My Man" – 3:05
  - Taken from the album With Luv' (1978)
5. "Sugar Babe" – 2:45
  - Taken from the album With Luv' (1978)
6. "Who Do You Wanna Be" – 3:44
  - Taken from the album With Luv' (1978)
7. "U.O.Me" – 2:55
  - Taken from the album With Luv' (1978)
8. "Eeny Meeny Miny Moe" – 2:54
  - Taken from the album Lots of Luv' (1979)

== Personnel ==
- José Hoebee – vocals
- Patty Brard – vocals
- Marga Scheide – vocals

== Production ==
- Hans van Hemert – producer, songwriter

== Single release ==
#	Singles	Date
1.	"Who Do You Wanna Be"	November 1979

== Chart performance ==
Country	Album charts	Peak position
Netherlands	Nationale Hitparade LP Top 50	21
