= Completely in Luv' =

Box set by Luv'
- Released: April 2006
- Recorded: 1977 – 2006
- Genre: Pop, disco, dance
- Label: Universal Music
- Producer: Hans van Hemert

Luv' chronology
25 Jaar Na Waldolala (2003)	Completely in Luv' (2006)	Only Luv' – The Matt Pop Remixes (2025)

Completely in Luv' is a four-CD boxed set of four studio albums, With Luv' (1978), Lots of Luv' (1979), True Luv' (1979) and Forever Yours (1980) recorded by Dutch girl group Luv' during their heyday in the late 1970s and early 1980s. It was released in April 2006 by Universal Music. It features Luv's greatest hits scored in a dozen of countries (like "You're the Greatest Lover", "Trojan Horse", "Casanova" and "Ooh, Yes I Do"), album songs, bonus tracks and remixes.

In 1979, Luv' was 'Holland's best export act' and thus received the 'Conamus Export Award'.

== Album history ==
Completely in Luv is a concept developed by René Moonen, founder of the official fan club of Luv' in association with H.J.M Productions (the production company of Hans van Hemert, the producer who conceived the girl group) and the CNR label. Its release coincided with the reunion of the original group members Patty Brard, José Hoebee and Marga Scheide. The pop trio had a busy schedule in 2006 in the Netherlands and Flanders (Belgium). In addition to the box set, a reality TV documentary, Back in Luv, about their comeback was broadcast on RTL 5 (a Dutch TV channel) and on VTM (a Flemish channel) and a DVD (also entitled Back in Luv') came out.

On 26, 27 and 28 May 2006, Luv' and Bobby Farrell (of Boney M) were the guest stars during three big shows of De Toppers (a supergroup featuring three popular singers in the Netherlands: Gerard Joling, René Froger and Gordon) at the Amsterdam ArenA. Moreover, Luv' was booked for many appearances on TV and live performances.

== Track listing ==
All tracks written by Hans van Hemert and Piet Souer under the pseudonym 'Janschen & Janschens' unless otherwise noted.

=== CD 1 ===
==== With Luv' (1978) ====
1. "You're the Greatest Lover" – 2:50
2. "Who Do You Wanna Be" – 3:44
3. "My Man" – 3:05
4. "Sugar Babe" – 2:49
5. "Don Juanito De Carnaval" (Daniele Pace, Franco Bracardi, Gianni Boncompagni, Janschen & Janschens) – 3:09
6. "Life Is on My Side" – 2:38
7. "U.O.Me (Welcome to Waldolala)" – 2:55
8. "Dream, Dream" – 3:30
9. "Oh, Get Ready" – 3:16
10. "Louis, Je t'Adore" – 3:40
11. "Everybody's Shaking Hands on Broadway" – 3:27
12. "Hang On" – 3:07

==== Bonus Tracks ====
13. "Don't Let Me Down" – 2:37
  - B-side of "My Man".
14. "Eres Mi Mejor Amante" (Alfred Garrido, Janschen & Janschens) – 2:50
  - Spanish version of "You're the Greatest Lover".
15. "All You Need Is Luv' Jingle" – 0:12

=== CD 2 ===
==== Lots of Luv' (1979) ====
1. "Casanova" – 3:48
2. "Eeny Meeny Miny Moe" – 2:46
3. "DJ" – 3:20
4. "Shoes Off (Boots On)" – 3:07
5. "Marcellino" – 3:14
6. "Dandy" – 2:46
7. "The Night of Love" – 3:32
8. "Money, Honey" – 3:16
9. "I.M.U.R" – 3:35
10. "I Like Sugar Candy Kisses" – 3:34
11. "If You Love Me" – 2:34
12. "Saint Tropez" – 3:04

==== Bonus Tracks ====
13. "Trojan Horse" – 3:24
14. "Casanova" (Alfred Garrido, Janschen & Janschens) – 3:49
  - Spanish version
15. "Luv' Hitpack" – 5:29
  - Long version:Casanova/Life Is on My Side/U.O.Me/Casanova/You're the Greatest Lover/Life Is on My Side/Trojan Horse/Everybody's Shakin' Hands on Broadway/Casanova
16. "All You Need Is Luv' Jingle" – 0:12

=== CD 3 ===
==== True Luv' (1979) ====
1. "Ooh, Yes I Do" (Hans van Hemert) – 2:57
2. "Ann-Maria" (Piet Souer) – 4:40
3. "Rhythm 'n' Shoes" (van Hemert) – 3:07
4. "Flash" (van Hemert) – 3:51
5. "Boys Goodnight" (Souer) – 2:40
6. "Daddy, What a Life" (Souer) – 3:08
7. "Cloud Nr. 9" (van Hemert) – 3:25
8. "Wine, Women And Song" (van Hemert) – 3:45
9. "Getaway" (Souer) – 3:03
10. "Stop Me" (Souer) – 3:09
11. "My Guy" – 3:49
12. "Let There Be Love" – 2:39

==== Bonus Tracks ====
13. "Si, Que Si" (Alfred Garrido, van Hemert) – 3:05
  - Spanish Version of Ooh, Yes I Do
14. "Ann-Maria" (Alfred Garrido, Souer) – 4:04
  - Spanish version
15. "All You Need Is Luv' Jingle" – 0:12

=== CD 4 ===
==== Forever Yours (1980) ====
1. "My Number One" – 3:11
2. "Billy The Kid" – 3:16
3. "Never Wanted to Be..." – 4:34
4. "Mother of the Hearts" – 3:04
5. "Tingalingaling" – 2:30
6. "The Show Must Go On" – 3:21
7. "Ooh, I Like It Too" – 3:06
8. "I Win It" – 3:05
9. "Song of Love and Understanding" – 3:59
10. "Some Call It Happiness" – 3:09
11. "Be My Lover Tonight" – 3:27
12. "One More Little Kissie" – 3:50

==== Bonus Tracks ====
13. "You're the Greatest Lover '93" – 3:18
14. "Megamix '93 (Long Version)" – 4:04
  - Medley of U.O.Me (Waldolala)/Trojan Horse/You're the Greatest Lover/Ooh, Yes I Do/Casanova
15. "Trojan Horse (2006 remix)" – 3:05
16. "All You Need Is Luv' Jingle" – 0:12

== Personnel ==
=== Luv' ===
- José Hoebee – vocals
- Marga Scheide – vocals
- Patty Brard – vocals
- Ria Thielsch – vocals

Additional personnel

- Ernö Olah & Metropole Orkest – strings

=== Production ===
- Producer: Hans van Hemert
- Arranger/conductor: Piet Souer
- Mastering: www.pat-sound.nl

=== Design ===
- Photography: Claude Vanheye
- Design: Studio Eric Wondergem BNO, Baarn

== Charts ==
Chart (2006)	Peak position
Netherlands (Album Top 100)	95
