= Lots of Luv' =

Studio album by Luv'
- Released: 1979; 2006 (Remastered, as part of the Completely in Luv' box set)
- Recorded: 1978
- Genre: Pop, Disco
- Length: 40:47
- Label: Philips Records/Phonogram (original release); Universal Music Netherlands
- Producer: Hans van Hemert

Luv' chronology
With Luv' (1978)	Lots of Luv' (1979)	True Luv' (1979)

Lots of Luv' is the second album by Dutch girl group Luv', released in May 1979 by Philips Records/Phonogram. It features the hit singles Casanova (a Top 10 song in a large part of Continental Europe) and Eeny Meeny Miny Moe, which maintained Luv's position as the best Dutch export act of 1979. In 2006, this LP was reissued in digitally remastered form by Universal Music Netherlands as part of the Completely in Luv' box set and featured the popular chart topper "Trojan Horse".

== Background ==
In the second half of 1978, Luv' reached fame in a large part of Europe and South Africa thanks to the success of smash hits like "You're the Greatest Lover", "Trojan Horse" and the With Luv' album. The release party of the second LP (entitled Lots of Luv') took place at the Lido Club in Amsterdam in May 1979. Two songs from this opus were released as singles: "Casanova" and "Eeny Meeny Miny Moe" (inspired by Boney M.'s 1978 song "Rasputin").

After the release of the 1978 With Luv', the producers and songwriters Hans van Hemert and Piet Souer (under the pseudonym Janschen & Janschens) teamed up once again to supervise the recording and the production of Lots of Luv, influenced by Pop music, Disco and Latin American music sounds.

== Track listing ==
All tracks written by Hans van Hemert and Piet Souer under the pseudonym 'Janschen & Janschens' except where noted.

Side A:

1. "Casanova" – 3:48
2. "Eeny Meeny Miny Moe" – 2:46
3. "DJ" – 3:20
4. "Shoes Off (Boots On)" – 3:07
5. "Marcellino" – 3:14
6. "Dandy" – 2:46

Side B:

1. "The Night of Love" – 3:32
2. "Money, Honey" – 3:16
3. "I.M.U.R" – 3:35
4. "I Like Sugar Candy Kisses" – 3:34
5. "If You Love Me" – 2:34
6. "Saint Tropez" – 3:04

== 2006 bonus tracks ==
Lots of Luv' was remastered and reissued in 2006 as part of the Completely in Luv' box set with the same track listing and four bonus tracks:

13. "Trojan Horse" (Janschen & Janschens) – 3:24
14. "Casanova" (Alfred Garrido, Janschen & Janschens) – 3:49
  - Spanish version
15. "Luv' Hitpack" (Janschen & Janschens) – 5:29
  - Long version:Casanova/Life Is on My Side/U.O.Me/Casanova/You're the Greatest Lover/Life Is On My Side/Trojan Horse/Everybody's Shakin' Hands on Broadway/Casanova
16. "All You Need Is Luv' Jingle" (Janschen & Janschens) – 0:12

== Personnel ==
Luv'

- José Hoebee – vocals
- Marga Scheide – vocals
- Patty Brard – vocals

Additional personnel

- Ernö Olah & Metropole Orkest – strings

=== Production ===
- Producer: Hans van Hemert
- Arranger/conductor: Piet Souer
- Mastering: www.pat-sound.nl
- Remix track 15 Luv' Hitpack by Peter 'Hithouse' Slaghuis

=== Design ===
- Photography: Claude Vanheye
- Design: Jan H. van Uden
- Art Direction: Clouds Studio

== Singles ==
#	Singles	Date
1.	"Casanova"	April 1979
2.	"Eeny Meeny Miny Moe"	August 1979

== Charts ==
Because Luv's public was composed by a majority of teenagers at the time of the release of Lots of Luv', the group's singles/performance (sales) fared more significant than the albums. In the late 1970s, 45-RPM vinyl records were popular formats among the young public whereas the full-length LP's attracted more adult listeners. This situation explains why Luv' achieved a greater success on the singles charts than on the album lists.
Lots of Luv' reached platinum status in the Netherlands.

Country	Album charts	Peak position	Certification (if any)	Sales/shipments
Netherlands	LP Top 50	7	Platinum	100,000+
Netherlands	Nationale Hitparade LP Top 50	4	Platinum	100,000+
Germany	Media Control Charts	39	-	-
Austria	Alben Top 25	13	-	-
Denmark	BT Hitliste	17 (Year-end charts)	-	-
