= Only Luv' – The Matt Pop Remixes =

Remix album by Luv'
- Released: May 24, 2025
- Recorded: 1978–1980, 2025
- Genre: Dance pop, dance music
- Label: Concerto Records
- Producer: Hans van Hemert

Luv' chronology
Completely In Luv' (2006)	Only Luv' – The Matt Pop Remixes (2025)

Singles from Only Luv' – The Matt Pop Remixes
- 1. "Eeny Meeny Miny Moe (Matt Pop Album Remix)" Released: April 25, 2025; 2. "I.M.U.R. (Matt Pop Album Remix)" Released: May 9, 2025; 3. "Eeny Meeny Miny Moe / I.M.U.R. / Si Que Si – The Matt Pop Remixes EP" Released: May 23, 2025; 4. "You're The Greatest Lover (Matt Pop Album Remix)" Released: June 13, 2025; 5. "Don Juanito De Carnaval (Matt Pop Album Remix)" Released: July 22, 2025; 6. "Trojan Horse (Matt Pop 2025 Extended Remix)" Released: August 18, 2025; 7. "Life Is On My Side (Matt Pop Remixes)" Released: November 28, 2025

Only Luv' – The Matt Pop Remixes is a remix album by Dutch girl group Luv'. It was released on May 24, 2025, by Concerto Records. The album, initiated by Peter Boonstra, contains remixes of Luv's greatest hits and lesser-known songs by producer Matt Pop, using original master tapes provided by Hans van Hemert and Universal Music.

== Background and conception ==
In May 2015, Luv' fan and author Peter Boonstra published The Story of Luv', a photo book containing exclusive images of the group alongside a CD compilation featuring their greatest hits and remixes of "Trojan Horse" and "Life Is On My Side" by Dutch remixer-producer Matt Pop. Group members Marga Scheide and José Hoebee endorsed the release, while Patty Brard opposed it. The publication was later banned due to copyright issues involving photographs.

Following the withdrawal of The Story of Luv', Boonstra initiated a new project in response to positive feedback from the earlier Matt Pop remixes. He developed plans for a full-length remix album, again with Matt Pop as the sole remixer. The album was produced using original master tapes from producer Hans van Hemert's archives, with approval from Scheide and Hoebee.

On March 22, 2025, the website onlyluv.nl was launched, encouraging fans to reserve May 24 for an upcoming mysterious event. On March 29, 2025, the site and associated social media platforms announced the development of a new project: the release of the remix album Only Luv' – The Matt Pop Remixes.

Ahead of the album's release, two singles and an EP were issued on digital platforms: "Eeny Meeny Miny Moe (Matt Pop Album Mix)" on April 25, 2025, "I.M.U.R. (Matt Pop Album Remix)" on May 9, 2025, and "Eeny Meeny Miny Moe / I.M.U.R. / Si Que Si – The Matt Pop Remixes EP" on May 23, 2025. Following the release of the remix album, additional digital singles were made available to maintain momentum: "You're the Greatest Lover (Matt Pop Album Remix)" on June 13, 2025, "Don Juanito de Carnaval (Matt Pop Album Remix)" on July 22, 2025, "Trojan Horse (Matt Pop 2025 Extended Remix)" on August 18, 2025 and "Life Is On My Side (Matt Pop Remixes)" on November 28, 2025.

== Release and promotion ==
The release party for Only Luv' – The Matt Pop Remixes took place at Wisseloord Studios in Hilversum on May 24, 2025, the same day the album was launched.

Moreover, Only Luv' – The Matt Pop Remixes was issued on all major digital platforms on June 20, following its initial physical release on CD and vinyl.

Luv' unveiled a sequel to Only Luv’, entitled Only Luv’ – The Matt Pop Remixes (Extended Versions), on CD on October 31, 2025, and on streaming platforms on December 19, 2025.

== Track listing ==
All tracks remixed by Matt Pop.

CD edition and streaming platforms:

Only Luv' – The Matt Pop Remixes – CD and streaming platforms
No.	Title	Writer(s)	Length
1.	"Life Is On My Side" (Matt Pop Album Remix)	Hans van Hemert and Piet Souer (aka Janschen & Janschens)	4:04
2.	"Eeny Meeny Miny Moe" (Matt Pop Album Remix)	Hans van Hemert and Piet Souer (aka Janschen & Janschens	3:13
3.	"You're The Greatest Lover" (Matt Pop Album Remix)	Hans van Hemert and Piet Souer (aka Janschen & Janschens	4:16
4.	"Who Do You Wanna Be" (Matt Pop Album Remix)	Hans van Hemert and Piet Souer (aka Janschen & Janschens	3:19
5.	"The Night Of Love" (Matt Pop Album Remix)	Hans van Hemert and Piet Souer (aka Janschen & Janschens	3:57
6.	"Trojan Horse" (Matt Pop 2025 Album Remix)	Hans van Hemert and Piet Souer (aka Janschen & Janschens	3:11
7.	"I.M.U.R." (Matt Pop Album Remix)	Hans van Hemert and Piet Souer (aka Janschen & Janschens	3:45
8.	"Don Juanito De Carnaval" (Matt Pop Album Remix)	Daniele Pace, Franco Bracardi, Gianni Boncompagni and Janschen & Janschens	3:27
9.	"Tingalingaling" (Matt Pop Album Remix)	Hans van Hemert and Piet Souer (aka Janschen & Janschens	2:44
10.	"Ann-Maria (Spanish version)" (Matt Pop Album Remix)	Piet Souer, Alfredo Garrido	4:28
11.	"My Guy" (Matt Pop Album Remix)	Hans van Hemert and Piet Souer (aka Janschen & Janschens	4:10
12.	"U.O.Me" (Matt Pop Album Remix)	Hans van Hemert and Piet Souer (aka Janschen & Janschens	3:29
13.	"Getaway" (Matt Pop Album Remix)	Piet Souer	2:42
14.	"Ooh, Yes I Do" (Matt Pop Album Remix)	Hans van Hemert	3:15
15.	"Casanova" (Matt Pop Album Remix)	Hans van Hemert and Piet Souer (aka Janschen & Janschens	3:40
16.	"Boys Goodnight" (Matt Pop Album Remix)	Hans van Hemert and Piet Souer (aka Janschen & Janschens	3:04
17.	"One More Little Kissie" (Matt Pop Album Remix)	Hans van Hemert and Piet Souer (aka Janschen & Janschens	4:16
18.	"Tingalingaling" (Matt Pop Extended Remix)	Hans van Hemert and Piet Souer (aka Janschen & Janschens	4:16
Total length:			65:57

Pink and blue editions on vinyl:

Only Luv' – The Matt Pop Remixes – Pink and blue editions on vinyl - Side 1A
No.	Title	Writer(s)	Length
1.	"Life Is On My Side" (Matt Pop Extended Remix)	Hans van Hemert and Piet Souer (aka Janschen & Janschens)	5:23
2.	"Eeny Meeny Miny Moe" (Matt Pop Extended Remix)	Hans van Hemert and Piet Souer (aka Janschen & Janschens	5:28
3.	"You're The Greatest Lover" (Matt Pop Album Remix)	Hans van Hemert and Piet Souer (aka Janschen & Janschens	4:16
4.	"Who Do You Wanna Be" (Matt Pop Extended Remix)	Hans van Hemert and Piet Souer (aka Janschen & Janschens	5:04
Total length:			20:11

Only Luv' – The Matt Pop Remixes – Pink and blue editions on vinyl - Side 1B
No.	Title	Writer(s)	Length
1.	"The Night Of Love" (Matt Pop Extended Remix)	Hans van Hemert and Piet Souer (aka Janschen & Janschens	5:48
2.	"Trojan Horse" (Matt Pop 2025 Extended Remix)	Hans van Hemert and Piet Souer (aka Janschen & Janschens	4:34
3.	"I.M.U.R. (Matt Pop Extended Remix)" (Matt Pop Extended Remix)	Hans van Hemert and Piet Souer (aka Janschen & Janschens	6:03
4.	"Don Juanito De Carnaval" (Matt Pop Album Remix)	Daniele Pace, Franco Bracardi, Gianni Boncompagni and Janschen & Janschens
Total length:			19:52

Only Luv' – The Matt Pop Remixes – Pink and blue editions on vinyl - Side 2A
No.	Title	Writer(s)	Length
1.	"Tingalingaling" (Matt Pop Extended Remix)	Hans van Hemert and Piet Souer (aka Janschen & Janschens	4:57
2.	"Ann-Maria (Spanglish version)" (Matt Pop Album Remix)	Piet Souer,Alfredo Garrido	4:28
3.	"My Guy" (Matt Pop Extended Remix)	Hans van Hemert and Piet Souer (aka Janschen & Janschens	5:59
4.	"U.O.Me" (Matt Pop Extended Remix)	Hans van Hemert and Piet Souer (aka Janschen & Janschens	5:46
Total length:			21:10

Only Luv' – The Matt Pop Remixes – Pink and blue editions on vinyl - Side 2B
No.	Title	Writer(s)	Length
1.	"Getaway" (Matt Pop Extended Remix)	Piet Souer	5:10
2.	"Si Que Si (Spanish version of Ooh, Yes I Do)" (Matt Pop Album Remix)	Hans van Hemert, Alfredo Garrido	3:15
3.	"Casanova"	Hans van Hemert and Piet Souer (aka Janschen & Janschens	5:37
4.	"Boys Goodnight" (Matt Pop Extended Remix)	Hans van Hemert and Piet Souer (aka Janschen & Janschens	3:04
5.	"One More Little Kissie (Matt Pop Album Remix) (4:16)"	Hans van Hemert and Piet Souer (aka Janschen & Janschens	4:16
Total length:			21:22

Only Luv' - The Matt Pop Remixes - The Extended Versions - CD and streaming platforms:

No.	Title	Writer(s)	Length
1.	"Life Is On My Side" (Matt Pop Extended Remix)	Hans van Hemert and Piet Souer (aka Janschen & Janschens)	5:23
2.	"Eeny Meeny Miny Moe" (Matt Pop Extended Remix)	Hans van Hemert and Piet Souer (aka Janschen & Janschens	5:28
3.	"You're The Greatest Lover" (Matt Pop Album Remix)	Hans van Hemert and Piet Souer (aka Janschen & Janschens	4:16
4.	"Who Do You Wanna Be" (Matt Pop Extended Remix)	Hans van Hemert and Piet Souer (aka Janschen & Janschens	5:04
5.	"The Night Of Love" (Matt Pop Extended Remix)	Hans van Hemert and Piet Souer (aka Janschen & Janschens	5:48
6.	"Trojan Horse" (Matt Pop 2025 Extended Remix)	Hans van Hemert and Piet Souer (aka Janschen & Janschens	4:34
7.	"I.M.U.R. (Matt Pop Extended Remix)" (Matt Pop Extended Remix)	Hans van Hemert and Piet Souer (aka Janschen & Janschens	6:03
8.	"Tingalingaling" (Matt Pop Extended Remix)	Hans van Hemert and Piet Souer (aka Janschen & Janschens	4:57
9.	"Ann-Maria (Spanglish version)" (Matt Pop Album Remix)	Piet Souer,Alfredo Garrido	4:28
10.	"My Guy" (Matt Pop Extended Remix)	Hans van Hemert and Piet Souer (aka Janschen & Janschens	5:59
11.	"U.O.Me" (Matt Pop Extended Remix)	Hans van Hemert and Piet Souer (aka Janschen & Janschens	5:46
12.	"Getaway" (Matt Pop Extended Remix)	Piet Souer	5:10
13.	"Si Que Si (Spanish version of Ooh, Yes I Do)" (Matt Pop Album Remix)	Hans van Hemert, Alfredo Garrido	3:15
14.	"Casanova"	Hans van Hemert and Piet Souer (aka Janschen & Janschens	5:37
15.	"Boys Goodnight" (Matt Pop Extended Remix)	Hans van Hemert and Piet Souer (aka Janschen & Janschens	3:04
16.	"One More Little Kissie (Matt Pop Album Remix) (4:16)"	Hans van Hemert and Piet Souer (aka Janschen & Janschens	4:16
Total length:			79:08

Only Luv' - The Matt Pop Remixes - The Extended Versions - bonus track on streaming platforms
No.	Title	Writer(s)	Length
8.	"Don Juanito De Carnaval (Matt Pop Album Remix) (3:27)"	Daniele Pace, Franco Bracardi, Gianni Boncompagni and Janschen & Janschens	3:27
Total length:			82:35

== Personnel ==
=== Luv ===
- José Hoebee – vocals
- Marga Scheide – vocals
- Patty Brard – vocals

=== Production ===
- Production: Peter Boonstra
- Remix: Matt Pop

=== Photos and design ===
- Photo front: Ronnie Hertz
- Photo inside and back: Didl Zill
- Graphic design: René van Ooijen
