= Dream, Dream =

Single by Luv'

from the album With Luv'
- B-side: "Hang On"
- Released: November 1977
- Recorded: 1977
- Genre: Pop
- Length: 3:30
- Label: Philips/Phonogram Records (Benelux & German speaking countries); Harvest Records (UK)
- Songwriters: Hans van Hemert and Piet Souer (as Janschen & Janschens)
- Producer: Hans van Hemert

Luv' singles chronology
"My Man (Luv' song)" (1977)	"Dream, Dream" (1977)	"U.O.Me (Theme from Waldolala)" (1978)

"Dream, Dream" is the second single by the Dutch girl group Luv', released in November 1977 by Philips/Phonogram Records. It appears on the group's first album With Luv' (1978).

== Background ==
The previous single ("My Man") was the group's debut record in 1977 and charted in the Benelux countries. The follow-up single was entitled "Dream, Dream". The musical arrangements were inspired by the sound of ABBA. It flopped and the group seemed to be a one-hit wonder. The real breakthrough came in 1978 with the success of "U.O.Me (Theme from Waldolala)" and "You're the Greatest Lover".

== Commercial performance ==
The single failed to enter the Dutch Top 40. However, in December 1977, it peaked at #16 on the Tipparade which listed the singles below number 40 that did not enter the official Dutch charts.

== Track listing and release ==
7" vinyl

- a. "Dream, Dream"
- b. "Hang On"

Country	Year	Label	Catalog
Netherlands/Germany/Belgium	1977	Philips/Phonogram Records	6012752
UK	1977	Harvest Records/EMI	HAR 5136

== Sources ==
- Details about release of "Dream, Dream" on Discogs database
- Luv' "Dream Dream" - general info, 40th anniversary 2017
- Release information on Rate Your Music website
