= Who Do You Wanna Be =

Single by Luv'

from the album With Luv', Greatest Hits
- B-side: "I.M.U.R"
- Released: November 1979
- Recorded: 1978
- Genre: Pop
- Length: 3:43
- Label: Philips/Phonogram Records
- Songwriters: Hans van Hemert and Piet Souer (a.k.a. Janschen & Janschens)
- Producer: Hans van Hemert

Luv' singles chronology
"Eeny Meeny Miny Moe" (1979)	"'Who Do You Wanna Be'" (1979)	"Ooh, Yes I Do" (1979)

"Who Do You Wanna Be" is the eighth single by the Dutch girl group Luv', released in the autumn of 1979 by Philips/Phonogram Records. This song appears on the formation's debut album With Luv' and their first compilation "Greatest Hits". It was the trio's closing release under their contract with Philips/Phonogram just before they joined CNR/Carrere Records.

== Song history ==
When record producer Hans van Hemert and Luv' planned to leave Phonogram Records in 1979, the label decided as a counterattack to release Who Do You Wanna Be only in the Netherlands. This song was taken from the group's first opus With Luv' and later included on a Greatest Hits album. Luv' group didn't promote the song and instead focused on their Carrere releases (Ooh, Yes I Do and True Luv'). That's why it failed to enter the record charts. Lead singer José Hoebee has stated this is her favourite song from their debut album, and that it was her first choice for a lead single. In 2025, the track was remixed as part of Only Luv' – The Matt Pop Remixes.

== Cover version ==
In 1979, Irish pop group Gina, Dale Haze and the Champions released a cover version of this track. This followed a cover version of You're the Greatest Lover (also originally by Luv') - both singles made the Irish top ten.
