= Luv' Hitpack =

Single by Luv'

from the album Greatest Hits
- Released: December 1989
- Recorded: 1989
- Genre: Pop; dance
- Length: 4:32 (single version); 5:29 (long version)
- Label: Mercury/Phonogram
- Songwriters: Hans van Hemert; Piet Souer (a.k.a. Janschen & Janschens)
- Producers: Peter "Hithouse" Slaghuis; Hans van Hemert

Luv' singles chronology
"You're the Greatest Lover [reissue]" (1989)	"Luv' Hitpack" (1989)	"Starmaker with the All Stars" (1990)

"Luv' Hitpack" is the seventeenth single by the Dutch girl group Luv' released in 1989 by Mercury/Phonogram Records and is a megamix conceived by Peter Slaghuis. It appears on the compilation Greatest Hits. The long version of this medley is included as a bonus track on the box set Completely in Luv'.

== Background ==
Marga Scheide accompanied by two vocalists Diana van Berlo and Michelle Gold reformed Luv' in 1989 and promoted new material released by the Dutch label Dureco/High Fashion Music. Meanwhile, the group's first record company Philips/Phonogram Records and its sister label (Mercury Records) decided to repackage Luv's old repertoire. This led to the release of the Greatest Hits album. The album included Luv's successful hit singles, album songs and a bonus track: "Luv' Hitpack", a megamix conceived by the Dutch DJ-remixer-producer Peter Slaghuis. The strategy of Mercury Records to release this medley was inspired by the example of Boney M. whose megamix and remixes entered the European charts.

== Commercial performance ==
"Luv' Hitpack" did not enter any record chart due to a lack of promotion by the group.

== Formats and track listings ==
"Luv' Hitpack" came out in three formats.

- 7-inch single
1. "Luv' Hitpack" (single version) – 4:32
  "Casanova"/"Life Is on My Side"/"U.O.Me"/"Casanova"/"You're the Greatest Lover"/"Life Is on My Side"/"Trojan Horse"/"Everybody's Shakin' Hands on Broadway"/"Casanova"
2. "Luv' Stuff" – 3:18
- 12-inch single
1. "Luv' Hitpack" (long version) – 5:28
2. "Luv' Stuff" – 4:50
- CD single
1. "Luv' Hitpack" (single version) – 4:32
  "Casanova"/"Life Is on My Side"/"U.O.Me"/"Casanova"/"You're the Greatest Lover"/"Life Is on My Side"/"Trojan Horse"/"Everybody's Shakin' Hands on Broadway"/"Casanova"
2. "Luv' Hitpack" (long version) – 5:29
  "Casanova"/"Life Is on My Side"/"U.O.Me"/"Casanova"/"You're the Greatest Lover"/"Life Is on My Side"/"Trojan Horse"/"Everybody's Shakin' Hands on Broadway"/"Casanova"
3. "Luv' Stuff" – 3:18
