= Chimène van Oosterhout =

Dutch TV personality, actress and singer (born 1964)

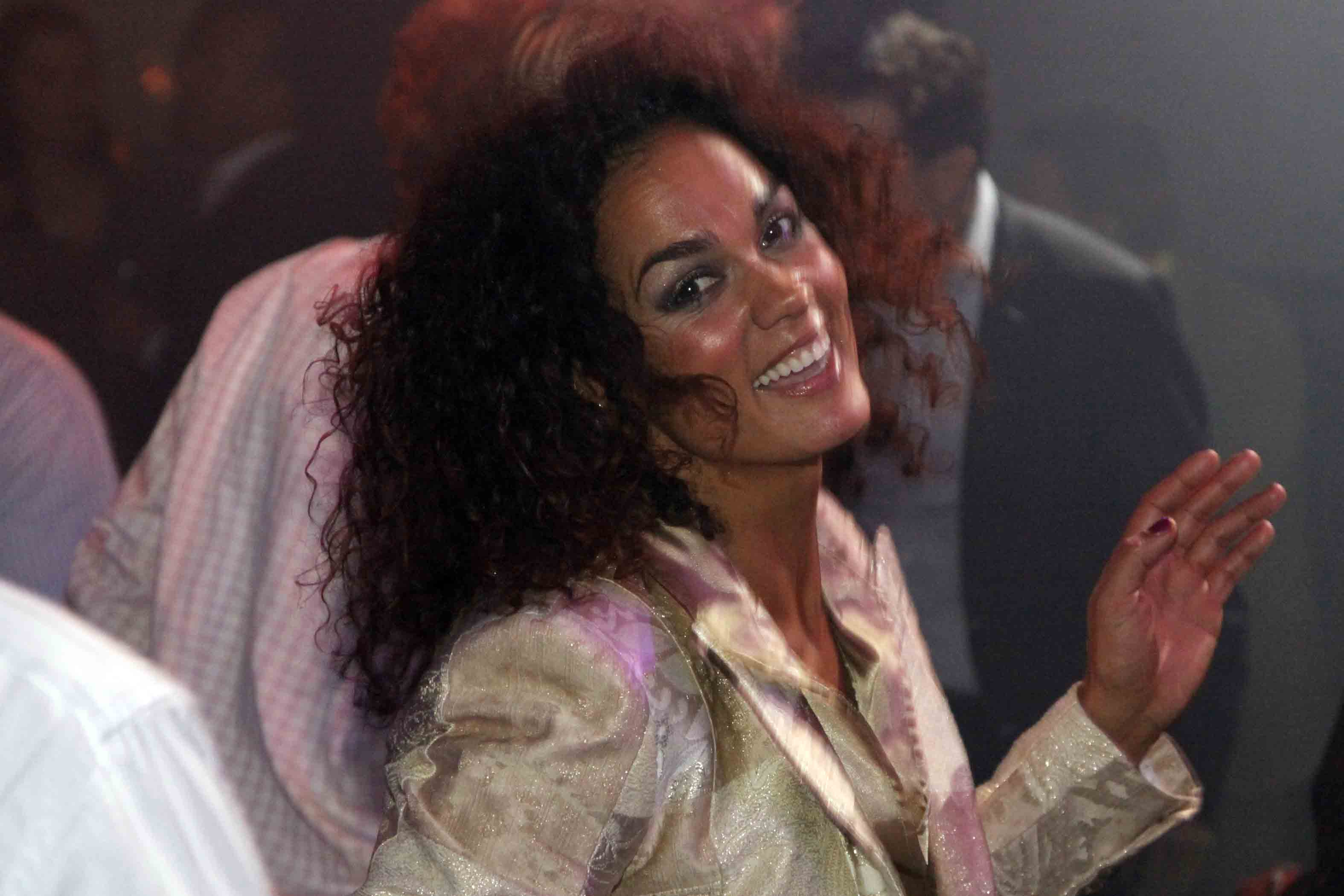
- foto: Jan Ladage

Background information
- Born: Chimène van Oosterhout; February 11, 1964 (age 62); Willemstad, Curaçao
- Origin: Netherlands
- Genres: Pop, reggaeteon
- Occupations: Tv presenter/host, singer, actress
- Instrument: Singing
- Years active: 1996–present
- Label: Pure Golden Records
- Formerly of: Luv'

Chimène van Oosterhout (born February 11, 1964, in Willemstad, Curaçao) is a Dutch TV personality, actress and singer. Since 1996, she has been presenting programs on Dutch television (TROS, Veronica TV, SBS6, Net5 and RTL 4). She was the winner of several Dutch celebrity TV competitions (including Peking Express VIPS in 2006 and Top Chef in 2009). Van Oosterhout is also an actress. She appeared in the longest-running Dutch soap opera Goede tijden, slechte tijden and had one of the leading parts in the American movie "X-Patriots" (2001) directed by Darien Sills-Evans. She owns her PR company (Van Oosterhout PR).

In January 2019, she became a member of Dutch girl group Luv' (as a replacement for Ria Thielsch). With Marga Scheide and José Hoebee, Chimène recorded the Latin pop-reggaeton single With Him Tonight which was released in July 2019. In early 2020, Luv' announced the interruption of their activities due to José Hoebee's ill health.

As a breast cancer survivor who shared her journey in a 2021 documentary, she has actively supported Pink Ribbon campaigns and other related events in the Netherlands since then.

== Early life ==
Chimène van Oosterhout was born on February 11, 1964, to a Dutch father and an Antillean mother (of Surinamese Creole and indian descent). At age 7, she moved with her family to the Netherlands. As a teenager, she modelled occasionally. After her A-level, she studied communication and psychology. From 1987 to 1989, she was a PR manager at Club Med. Over the years, she has learned foreign languages (English, German, French, Spanish, Italian and Swedish).

== TV career ==
In 1996, Chimène van Oosterhout sent a videotape to TROS and rapidly became a host on this channel. In 1999, she moved to Veronica TV and its sister channel Yorin. She later presented programs on SBS6, Net5 and RTL 4. In 2004, she was filmed with Marga Scheide and Patty Brard as they had a health cure on Ibiza on Patty's Fort (a reality show on Yorin).

=== TV shows ===
- Veronica goes back to the US of A (Veronica, 1999)
- Car Wars (Veronica, 1999)
- Demolition Cars (Veronica, 2000)
- Motor TV (Veronica, 2000 – 2002)
- Go Travel (Veronica, 2001)
- Yorin Travel (Yorin, 2001–2003)
- Gordons Lifestyle (Yorin, 2001)
- City Report (Veronica, 2002)
- Sterrenbeurs (SBS 6, 2003)
- Televisiedokter (RTL 4/Yorin, 2005)
- Snowmagazine VIPS (SBS 6, 2006)
- Health Angels (RTL 4, 2006)
- 4ME (RTL 4, 2010–2014)
- Medicaltravel (RTL 4, 2013)
- House Vision (RTL 4, 2013–2014)
- Sunny Side Up (RTL 4, 2016)
- Life Is Beautiful (RTL 4, 2016–2018)
- Nederland Ontdekt (RTL 4, 2024-2025)
- Cruise Life (RTL4, 2025)

=== Participation in celebrity TV competitions ===
- Patty's Fort (Yorin, 2004)
- Peking Express VIPS (NET 5, 2006 winner with Bart Veldkamp)
- Wildebeesten (NET 5, 2006, winner)
- Top Chef VIPS (RTL 4, 2009, winner)
- Vliegende Hollanders: Sterren van de Schans (SBS 6, 2013, winner)
- De Alleskunner VIPS (SBS6, 2022)

== Acting ==
Chimène van Oosterhout appeared in Dutch TV series (Goede tijden, slechte tijden, Onderweg naar morgen, Mijn dochter en ik, Het zonnetje in huis and Duo B&B).

In 2000, she had one of the leading parts in the American movie "X- Patriots". Darien Sills-Evans wrote, directed and starred in this romantic comedy about two black American men who travelled to the Netherlands – a place where no one looked like them – in search of self-identity. X-Patriots premiered on June 23, 2001, in Chicago at the AngelCiti Film Festival where it won "Best Film" and be noted in the Chicago Reader as the "Critic's Choice". A successful film festival run followed, with the film picking up usually good reviews and awards that included the LA Weekly Award Best Screenplay 2002, CCI Digital Award for Best Ensemble Cast 2002, Film Finders Maverick Award for Quality Low-Budget Film 2002 (Method Fest), Best Feature Angelciti Chicago 2001, and nominated for the Gordon Parks Award IFP 2001. The last public showing of X-Patriots was in New York City at DCTV's 24-Hour Film Festival, where it won the Audience Award.

== Public awareness about cancer ==
On March 1, 2021, Chimène van Oosterhout revealed on social media the trailer of a documentary series entitled "K*T Kanker" after she was diagnosed with breast cancer. In this documentary conceived by Filmfactory.nl (Evert den Hartogh and Jacco den Hartogh), she showed her life as a cancer patient during seven episodes.

As a breast cancer survivor, she has been a ambassador for Pink Ribbon awareness campaigns in the Netherlands since 2021.

== Luv' ==
On January 4, 2019, Dutch girl group Luv' announced an unexpected line-up change in De Telegraaf: Chimène van Oosterhout replaced Ria Thielsch. The female pop trio toured the nostalgia circuit in the Netherlands and Belgium. In July 2019, Luv' released a Latin pop-reggaeton single entitled With Him Tonight with Latin Grammy-nominated producers Keith Morrison and Manuel Garrido-Lecca. On February 7, 2020, Luv' (which had not performed since September 2019 due to José Hoebee's illness) informed the media and the public about the interruption of their activities.

== Columns for Wendy ==
Chimène van Oosterhout wrote monthly columns about cancer and other women's issues for WendyOnline.nl (Wendy van Dijk's online platform) and Wendy magazine between 2021 and 2024.

== Van Oosterhout PR ==
Since the 2000s, with her own company, Van Oosterhout has been involved in PR activities and corporate events for several companies (including Man Trucks en Bussen, 2009 Dakar Rally, Coty Inc Prestige, Oral B, Feenstra, and Visma).

== Yoga instructor ==
Between 2014 and 2017, she received a Hatha yoga training to become a yoga instructor.

== Personal life ==
On February 5, 2003, Chimène van Oosterhout gave birth to a son named Lyam.
