= With Luv' =

Studio album by Luv'
- Released: August 1978; 2006 (Remastered, as part of the Completely in Luv' box set)
- Recorded: 1977–1978
- Genre: Pop, disco
- Length: 40:47
- Label: Philips Records/Phonogram (original release); Universal Music Netherlands
- Producer: Hans van Hemert

Luv' chronology
| With Luv' (1978) | Lots of Luv' (1979) |

Singles from With Luv'
- 1. "My Man" Released: May 1977; 2. "Dream, Dream" Released: November 1977; 3. "U.O.Me (Theme from Waldolala)" Released: February 1978; 4. "You're the Greatest Lover" Released: July 1978; 5. "Trojan Horse" Released: November 1978; 6. "Who Do You Wanna Be" Released: November 1979

With Luv' is the first album by the Dutch girl group Luv', released in August 1978 by Phonogram/Philips Records. It includes the hit singles "My Man" (the trio's first record), "U.O.Me" (Luv's breakthrough in Benelux) and the million-seller "You're the Greatest Lover (a #1 song in a large part of Continental Europe). Some pressings of this album includes "Trojan Horse", a successful European chart topper. In 2006, this LP was reissued in digitally remastered form by Universal Music Netherlands as part of the Completely in Luv' box set.

== Background ==
After achieving success on the Dutch and Flemish charts (with the singles "My Man" and "U.O.Me") and on the European hit lists (with the single "You're the Greatest Lover"), Phonogram/Philips Records decided to release Luv's first full-length studio album: With Luv'.

Production was supervised by Hans van Hemert with the help of Piet Souer. Van Hemert and Souer co-wrote all of the album's tracks under the pseudonym Janschen & Janschens, with the exception of "Don Juanito de Carnaval" (a cover version of Raffaella Carrà's 1977 hit, "A far l'amore comincia tu"). The arrangements of the album were inspired by the musical styles that were popular on the mainstream music market in the late 1970s: the ABBA-esque repertoire (especially with "My Man" and "Dream, Dream"), carnival, Spanish and Latin American music sounds (with "U.O.Me" and "Don Juanito De Carnaval"), disco music (with "Everybody's Shaking Hands On Broadway") and pop music (with compositions like "You're the Greatest Lover" and "Who Do You Wanna Be").

The album release party took place at Hilversum Airport on 21 August 1978.

== Track listing ==
All tracks written by Hans van Hemert and Piet Souer under the pseudonym 'Janschen & Janschens' except where noted. Side A:

1. "You're the Greatest Lover" – 2: 50
2. "Who Do You Wanna Be" – 3:44
3. "My Man" – 3:05
4. "Sugar Babe" – 2:49
5. "Don Juanito de Carnaval" (Daniele Pace, Franco Bracardi, Gianni Boncompagni, Janschen & Janschens) – 3:09
6. "Life Is on My Side" – 2:38

Side B:

1. "U.O.Me (Welcome to Waldolala)" – 2:55
2. "Dream, Dream" – 3:30
3. "Oh, Get Ready" – 3:16
4. "Louis, je t'adore" – 3:40
5. "Everybody's Shaking Hands on Broadway" – 3:27
6. "Hang On" – 3:07

== Alternative album editions ==
- Germany - track A5: "Trojan Horse" (Janschen & Janschens) – 3:24

== 1980 re-issue ==
Philips Records re-issued the LP in 1980, after the trio had left the label and was under contract with CNR/Carrere Records. This pressing was part of the 'Success series', a re-issue of popular albums from the Philips back catalogue.

== 2006 reissue bonus tracks ==
With Luv' was remastered and reissued in 2006 as part of the Completely in Luv' box set with the same track listing and three bonus tracks:

"Don't Let Me Down" (Janschen & Janschens) – 2:37 (B-side of "My Man")
"Eres mi mejor amante" (Alfred Garrido, Janschen & Janschens) – 2:50 (Spanish version of "You're the Greatest Lover")
"All You Need Is Luv' Jingle" (Janschen & Janschens) – 0:12

== Singles ==
| # | Singles | Date |
|---|---|---|
| 1. | "My Man" | May 1977 |
| 2. | "Dream, Dream" | November 1977 |
| 3. | "U.O.Me (Theme from Waldolala)" | February 1978 |
| 4. | "You're the Greatest Lover" | July 1978 |
| 5. | "Trojan Horse" | November 1978 |
| 6. | "Who Do You Wanna Be" | November 1979 |

== Personnel ==
Luv'

- José Hoebee – vocals
- Marga Scheide – vocals
- Patty Brard – vocals

Additional personnel:

- Ernö Olah & Metropole Orkest – strings

=== Production ===
- Producer: Hans van Hemert
- Arranger/conductor: Piet Souer
- Mastering: www.pat-sound.nl

=== Design ===
- Photography: Claude Vanheye
- Design: Jan H. van Uden
- Art direction: Clouds Studio

== Charts ==
Luv' was a more successful band on the singles charts (at a time when it was significant for the music industry) than on the album charts because the trio's first fans were, in the late 1970s, mainly teenagers (known to be vinyl singles buyers).

With Luv' went platinum in the Netherlands and silver in Denmark.

| Country | Album charts | Peak position | Certification (if any) | Sales/shipments |
|---|---|---|---|---|
| Netherlands | LP Top 50 | 6 | Platinum | 100,000+ |
| Netherlands | Nationale Hitparade LP Top 50 | 8 | Platinum | 100,000+ |
| Germany | Media Control Charts | 50 | - | - |
| Austria | Alben TOP 25 | 15 | - | - |
| Denmark | BT Hitliste | 16 (Year-end charts) | Silver | 25,000+ |
