= Casanova (Luv' song) =

Single by Luv'

from the album Lots Of Luv'
- B-side: "D.J"
- Released: April 1979
- Recorded: 1979
- Genre: Pop
- Length: 3:48
- Label: Philips Records/Phonogram Records (Western countries); Tonpress (Poland)
- Songwriters: Hans van Hemert and Piet Souer (a.k.a. Janschen & Janschens)
- Producer: Hans van Hemert

Luv' singles chronology
"Trojan Horse" (1978)	"'Casanova'" (1979)	"Eeny Meeny Miny Moe" (1979)

"Casanova" is the sixth single by the Dutch girl group Luv', released in the spring of 1979 by Philips Records. This song appears on the formation's second album, Lots Of Luv', and was a Top 10 single in a large part of Continental Europe, maintaining Luv's position as the best Dutch export act of 1979.

== Background ==
After the success of the hit singles U.O.Me, You're the Greatest Lover and Trojan Horse as well as the album With Luv' in 1978, Philips/Phonogram Records released in April 1979 the new single, "Casanova", as a foretaste of the Lots Of Luv' LP. Casanova's lyrics deal with an unfaithful man who can't help seducing women. The song's arrangements were inspired by Flamenco, Latin American music, and 1970s Europop, making it a smash hit in Benelux, the German-speaking countries, and Denmark. A Spanish version was recorded.

In 2025, the track was remixed as part of Only Luv' – The Matt Pop Remixes.

== Commercial performance ==
"Casanova" was a Top 5 hit in Austria, Denmark, Switzerland and Flanders (Belgium), a Top 10 single in the Netherlands and Germany as well as a Top 20 song in Spain.

According to a special issue of Billboard magazine about the German recording industry published on December 8, 1979, the single sold 300.000 copies in the Federal Republic of Germany.

== Track listing and release ==
7" Vinyl

- a. "Casanova"
- b. "DJ"

Countries	Year	Label	Catalog
West Europe	1978	Philips/Phonogram Records	6012897
Poland	1978	Tonpress	772
Japan	1978	Philips/Phonogram Records	SFL 2426

== Cover versions ==
- In 1979, the German female singer, Kirstin Lill, recorded a Schlager version in German entitled "Du bist ein Casanova".
- Orchester Kai Werner from Germany covered it in 1979.
- German singer Max Greger recorded his version of in 1979.
- Ady Zehnpfennig from Germany rendered it in 1979.
- French formation Guy Denys His Organ And His Orchestra performed a cover version in 1979.
- Belgian singer Frank Vlietinck covered the song in 1979.
- Pop/Disco artist, Mona Carita, sang the track (entitled "Voi Mikä Casanova!") in Finnish< which was included on her 1979 eponymous album.
- Swiss band Claudius Alzner Und Seine Solisten covered the track for their compilation Cocktail International Vol. 17 in 1980.
- In 1980, Michael Schau Und Seine Wersi-Orgel from Germany recorded their version of the track.
- In 2006, Klaus Beyer recorded a German version of the song.
- In 2009, Flemish singer, Lindsay, performed the song in Dutch for her album De Mooiste Dag.
- In 2025, Dutch transgender entertainer and media personality Sidney Stacey released a "Luv’ Medley", which featured Luv’s classics, including "Casanova".

== Charts ==
=== Weekly charts ===
Chart (1979)	Peak position
Austria (Ö3 Austria Top 40)	2
Belgium/Flanders (BRT Top 30)	5
Belgium/Flanders (Ultratop)	4
Denmark (BT Hitlisten)	2
Europarade (currently Eurochart Hot 100 Singles)	2
Germany (Media Control Charts/Musikmarkt)	6
Netherlands (Dutch Top 40)	6
Netherlands (Nationale Hitparade (currently Single Top 100)	2
Spain (Los Domingos de ABC - Musica Joven)	18
Switzerland (Schweizer Hitparade)	4

=== Year-end charts ===
Chart (1979)	Position
Netherlands (Nationale Hitparade) 1979	16
Netherlands (Dutch Top 40) 1979	55
Belgium/Flanders (Ultratop) 1979	24
Germany (Media Control Charts/Musikmarkt) 1979	46
Switzerland (Schweizer Hitparade) 1979	31
Austria (Ö3 Austria Top 40) 1979	36
