= My Man (Luv' song) =

Single by Luv'

from the album With Luv'
- B-side: "Don't Let Me Down"
- Released: May 1977
- Recorded: 1977
- Genre: Pop
- Length: 3:04
- Label: Philips/Phonogram Records (Benelux & German speaking countries); Private Stock Records (UK)
- Songwriters: Hans van Hemert and Piet Souer (as Janschen & Janschens)
- Producer: Hans van Hemert

Luv' singles chronology
"My Man" (1977)	"Dream, Dream" (1977)

"My Man" is the debut single by the Dutch girl group Luv', released in May 1977 by Philips/Phonogram Records. It appears on the 1978 album With Luv'.

== Background ==
The song is Luv's very first commercially available single. In 1976, producers and songwriters Hans van Hemert and Piet Souer first recorded the music of a self-penned composition entitled "My Man" and were looking for female vocalists. They recruited José Hoebee, Marga Scheide and Patty Brard to form the girl group Luv'. The lyrics of this ABBA-esque track dealt with the death of a railroad man. It was a coincidence that around the time of its release, a taking of hostages happened in a train in De Punt in late May and early June 1977.

The single charted in the Netherlands and Belgium. Luv' performed it on the Musikladen TV show broadcast on August 18, 1977, to promote it in the German-speaking countries. However, "My Man" failed to break into the charts in Germany, Austria and Switzerland.

== Track listing and release ==
7" Vinyl

- a. "My Man"
- b. "Don't Let Me Down"

Country	Year	Label	Catalog
Netherlands/Germany/Portugal	1977	Philips/Phonogram Records	6012707
UK	1977	Private Stock Records	-

== Charts ==
Chart (1977)	Peak position
Europarade (Eurochart Hot 100 Singles)	19
Flanders/Belgium BRT Top 30	10
Flanders/Belgium (Ultratop Flanders)	11
Wallonia/Belgium (Ultratop)	47
Netherlands (Dutch Top 40)	12
Netherlands (Nationale Hitparade (currently Single Top 100)	12

=== Year-end charts ===
Chart (1977)	Position
Netherlands (Dutch Top 40)	155
Belgium/Flanders (Ultratop)	100
