= Eeny Meeny Miny Moe (Luv' song) =

Single by Luv'

from the album Lots Of Luv'
- B-side: "I.M.U.R"
- Released: August 1979
- Recorded: 1979
- Genre: Pop
- Length: 2:50
- Label: Philips/Phonogram Records (Europe); Meteor Records (Turkey)
- Songwriters: Hans van Hemert and Piet Souer (a.k.a. Janschen & Janschens)
- Producer: Hans van Hemert

Luv' singles chronology
"Casanova" (1979)	"Eeny Meeny Miny Moe" (1979)	"Who Do You Wanna Be" (1979)

"Eeny Meeny Miny Moe" is the seventh single by the Dutch girl group Luv', released in the summer of 1979 by Philips/Phonogram Records. This song appears on the formation's second album Lots Of Luv' and entered the record charts in Benelux, German-speaking countries and Denmark. In 2025, the track was remixed as part of Only Luv' – The Matt Pop Remixes.

== Background ==
After the success of Casanova on the Continental European charts, "Eeny Meeny Miny Moe" was released as the follow-up single. The track's title and chorus lyrics deal with a famous children's counting rhyme in English-speaking countries (Eeny Meeny Miny Moe). Its Bouzouki and Balalejka-theme is highly inspired by Boney M.'s "Rasputin". Prior to the release of the single, Luv' and their producer Hans van Hemert were not satisfied by the way Philips/Phonogram Records promoted their records. They were about to leave the label and were looking for another deal. The Dutch press speculated for weeks about their future record company. In October 1979, the trio signed a contract with CNR/Carrere.

== Commercial performance ==
"Eeny Meeny Miny Moe" was a Top 10 hit in Flanders (Belgium) and Denmark, a Top 20 hit in the Netherlands and Switzerland as well as a Top 40 hit in Germany.

== Track listing and release ==
7" Vinyl

- a. "Eeny Meeny Miny Moe"
- b. "I.M.U.R"

Countries	Year	Label	Catalog
NL/BEL/FR/GER/NOR/AUT/NZ/AT/CH	1978	Philips/Phonogram Records	6012920

7" Vinyl France

Philips/Phonogram French subsidiary released I.M.U.R as a A-side and Eeny Meeny Miny Moe as a B-side.

- a. "I.M.U.R"
- b. "Eeny Meeny Miny Moe"

Countries	Year	Label	Catalog
France	1978	Philips/Phonogram Records	6173632

== Cover version ==
- Pop/Disco artist, Mona Carita, covered the track in Finnish entitled "Kuti Kuti Kultasein " which was included on her 1979 eponymous album.

== Charts ==
=== Weekly charts ===
Chart (1979)	Peak position
Netherlands (Dutch Top 40)	11
Netherlands (Nationale Hitparade (currently Single Top 100)	6
Belgium/Flanders (BRT Top 30)	9
Belgium/Flanders (Ultratop)	10
Germany (Media Control Charts/Musikmarkt)	36
Switzerland (Schweizer Hitparade)	17
Denmark (BT Hitlisten)	8

=== Year-end charts ===
Chart (1979)	Position
Netherlands (Nationale Hitparade) 1979	80
Netherlands (Dutch Top 40) 1979	114
Belgium/Flanders (Ultratop) 1979	88
Germany (Media Control Charts/Musikmarkt) 1979	160

== 2025 remix ==
"Eeny Meeny Miny Moe (Matt Pop Album Remix)"

Single by Luv'
- Released: 25 April 2025
- Genre: Dance music
- Label: Only Luv', Concerto Records

Luv' singles chronology
"Let's Go To The Paradise Of Love (Ladies On Mars Extended Remix)" (2025)	"Eeny Meeny Miny Moe (Matt Pop Album Remix)" (2025)	"I.M.U.R (Matt Pop Album Remix)" (2025)

On April 25, 2025, "Eeny Meeny Miny Moe (Matt Pop Album Remix)" was released as a foretaste of Only Luv' – The Matt Pop Remixes.

=== Track listing ===
Digital download/streaming

1. "Eeny Meeny Miny Moe (Matt Pop Album Remix)" – 3:13
