= Gina, Dale Haze and the Champions =

Irish pop group

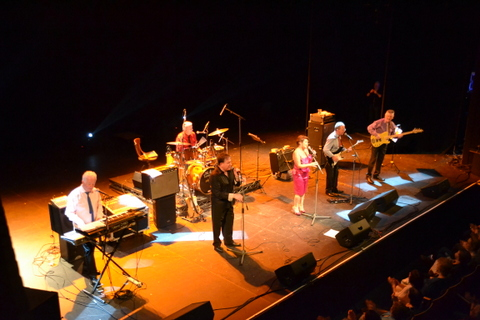
- Gina, Dale Haze & The Champions at the Cork Opera House 2012

Background information
- Also known as: G, D H & C, Gina and the Champions
- Origin: Cork, Ireland
- Genres: Pop, MOR
- Instruments: Vocals, keyboards, guitars, drums
- Years active: 1973–1992, 2009–present
- Labels: WEA, Play, Spider, Release, Koffi Records
- Past members: Gina; Dale Haze; Pat Walsh; Mossey Walsh; Eddie Fitzgerald; Tony Hornibrook
- Website: Official site

Gina, Dale Haze and the Champions are an Irish pop group who formed in 1973 and remained a successful chart act for the next two decades. They were one of the most popular club acts in Ireland, playing on the showband circuit until their retirement in 1992. In 2009 they staged a reunion (with all the original members) and they continue to perform at selected venues around Ireland.

== Background ==
The group, originally from Cork, consisted of a four-piece backing band (The Champions) and two lead singers (Gina and Dale Haze). Female lead Gina (real name Mary Hurley) took the vocal duties on most of the singles, while male lead Dale Haze (real name Jerdie Mackey) provided lead vocals on many songs and released a solo album in 1982. Members of the backing group were Pat Walsh, Mossey Walsh, Eddie Fitzgerald and Tony Hornibrook.

They featured regularly in the Irish charts – their biggest hits including "Minnie Minnie", "Do You Wanna Do It", "You're the Greatest Lover", "Who Do You Wanna Be", "Give Me Back My Love" and "Playing with Fire". They were voted Top Irish Pop Band in a number of voters polls over the period also. Briefly during 1985, they shortened their name to G, D H and C.

The group remained popular on the cabaret circuit and continued to play with the same line-up. In 1992 the group split due to the shift in popularity of the Irish showband genre and concert bookings began to dry up. Gina was also married to member Pat Walshe and after giving birth to her second child suffered post-natal depression and found it difficult to continue. The group never announced a split however and didn't perform a farewell gig. In October 2009, the original line-up reunited for an Irish tour, performing many of their hits. A night at the Cork Opera House was sold out three months in advance. A compilation album The Best of Gina, Dale Haze and the Champions was released to tie in with this. In 2012 they released a new CD "Baby I Love You and re-mastered a number of their earlier hits to produce 3 new CDs.

Dale Haze, real name Jerdie Mackey, died suddenly on November 21st 2020. He was buried in his native Kilmacthomas Co Waterford.

== Selected discography ==
=== Singles ===
Date	Single	Irish Charts
1973	"Paper Mansions"	-
1974	"Dreams Are Good Friends"	12
1974	"Single Girl"	-
1975	"Minnie Minnie"	5
1975	"Oh! My My"	22
1976	"Freedom"	28
1976	"Darling Honey"	-
1977	"Do You Wanna Do It"	2
1977	"I've Been Waiting for You"	8
1978	"Mary Lou"	23
1979	"You're the Greatest Lover"	10
1979	"Saturday Night Disco"	-
1979	"Who Do You Wanna Be"	7
1980	"Let There Be Love"	-
1981	"Drunken Sailor"	13
1981	"It's a Real Good Feeling"	15
1981	"Give Me Back My Love"	11
1982	"No-One Can Love"	-
1983	"More to You Than Meets the Eye"	14
1983	"Maybe Tomorrow"	24
1985	"Playing With Fire"	18
1985	"Don't Talk"	-
1986	"I Wanna Live" / "I'm So Sorry"	-
1986	"Run Like the Wind"	15
1987	"There's a Kind of Hush"	-
1988	"Breakaway"	18
1989	"A Woman in Love"	-
1990	"Love Me Tender"	28
1991	"I'm Blue"	-
1993	"The Cause of It All"	-

NOTE: Last seven singles credited to Gina only

=== Albums ===
- From the Beginning (1977)
- Champions Again (1979)
- Gina Dale Haze and the Champions (1981)
- G D H and C (1986)
- Hits and Memories
- Best of Gina Dale Haze and The Champions (2009)
- Baby I Love You (2012)
- Golden Memories Champions Revisited (2012)

Dale Haze also released a solo album in 1982 called A Real Good Feeling.
