= Mona Carita =

Finnish pop singer (born 1962)

- Also known as: Carita Virkkunen
- Born: Carita Hautanen; 16 April 1962 (age 64); Helsinki, Finland
- Genres: Pop, schangler, disco
- Occupation: Singer
- Years active: 1978–1983

Carita Virkkunen (née Hautanen; born 16 April 1962), better known by her stage name Mona Carita, is a Finnish pop/schangler singer. Her career as a singer began in 1978 in a girl duo called Cissy. Following this, her career continued as a solo career, during which she became known for numerous cover songs translated into Finnish, such as "Voi mikä Casanova!" ("Casanova"), "Kuti kuti kultasein" ("Eeny Meeny Miny Moe"), "Rasputin", "Tahdon" ("Yes, I'm Ready"), "Nykyaikainen" ("Modern Girl"), "Se ikuista on" ("Together We're Strong"), and "Gloria".

Although many of Mona Carita's songs became radio hits, she never reached the number-one spot on the charts. She also faced belittlement in the media, within musical circles and the television show Levyraati; in particular, the song "Kaupungin lapset"—a Finnish cover version of Kim Wilde's "Kids in America"—was mercilessly mocked on the radio show Rockradio. Mona Carita has also, in later times, been compared to another Finnish singer, Kikka. Both exuded overt sexuality, and the lyrics to their songs contained suggestive, risqué elements; however, unlike Kikka, Mona Carita never performed live. Furthermore, Kikka's repertoire consisted primarily of original songs, whereas Mona Carita’s career was built entirely on cover versions.

Mona Carita's cover version of the song "Gloria" appears on the Kaleidoscope FM radio station in the 2026 video game Grand Theft Auto VI.

== See also ==
- List of Finnish singers
