= Together We're Strong =

Single by Mireille Mathieu and Patrick Duffy

from the album Je veux l'aimer
- B-side: "Something's Going On"
- Released: 1983
- Genre: pop
- Length: 3:56; 6:14 (12" version)
- Label: Ariola; Arabella (12" version)
- Songwriters: Ralph Siegel and Richard Palmer-James
- Producer: Ralph Siegel

"Together We're Strong" is a duet written by Ralph Siegel and Richard Palmer-James and performed by French singer Mireille Mathieu and American actor Patrick Duffy. Released in France in 1983 under the Ariola label, the song became a hit in Europe. A 12" extended version was also released in France under the Arabella label. The song was included on Mathieu's album, Je veux l'aimer, as well as her German release, Nur für dich.

The B-side, "Something's Going On", is another Mathieu and Duffy duet written by Ralph Siegel and Phil Coulter. Mathieu and Duffy appeared on many European magazine covers together and made several television appearances singing the song.

Also in 1983, a Finnish version of the song was sung by Mona Carita and Ilkka Salo under the title "Se Ikuista on" ("It's Eternal").

In 1990, Dutch comedians Brigitte Kaandorp and Herman Finkers sung a parody of the song. Their version, titled "We Zijn Samen Sterk," came in the top 10 of the Dutch Top 40.

== Chart performance ==
Country	Peak position
France	5
Belgium (Flanders)	4
Germany	34
Netherlands	2
Finland	2
