= With Him Tonight =

Single by Luv'
- Released: July 4, 2019
- Genre: Latin pop - reggaeton
- Length: 3:24
- Label: Pure Golden Records
- Songwriter(s): Periko and Jessie Leon
- Producer(s): Henk Alberto Schorel; Keith Morrison; Manuel Garrido-Lecca

Luv' singles chronology
"LUV Dance-Medley" (1993)	"With Him Tonight" (2019)	"Trojan Horse (Kav Verhouzer Remix)" (2022)

"With Him Tonight" is a single by Dutch girl group Luv'. This song performed in English and Spanish was released on July 4, 2019. Luv' had not put out new material since the All You Need Is Luv' album in 1994. "With Him Tonight" was recorded by the original members Marga Scheide and José Hoebee as well as Chimène van Oosterhout (who replaced Ria Thielsch).

== Background and release ==
In March 2016, Marga Scheide and José Hoebee announced the comeback of Luv' in De Telegraaf. Ria Thielsch (who had already replaced Patty Brard in 1980) was part of this reunion. Between 2016 and 2018, Luv' toured the nostalgia circuit in the Netherlands and Belgium. The group intended to record a new repertoire produced by Juan Cristóbal Losada. However, nothing materialized.

On January 4, 2019, Luv' informed that Dutch media personality Chimène van Oosterhout had replaced Ria Thielsch. In May 2019, on the initiative of Henk Schorel, CEO of the multimedia company Viva Canal, the trio went to Miami to record a Latin pop-reggaeton single entitled "With Him Tonight" with producers Keith Morrison and Manuel Garrido-Lecca. In addition to the recording sessions, Luv' took part in photo shoots and also gave interviews on Spanish-speaking channels based in Florida (WWHB-CD, Mega TV, Beach Channel and Space Coast TV).

"With Him Tonight" premiered at Luv's fan club meeting in Best on June 30, 2019. On July 2, 2019, the audio of the track was posted on YouTube. On July 3, 2019, Luv' revealed their latest single during an exclusive interview on De Telegraaf web channel. The song was released the following day.

== Credits and personnel ==
- Song written by Periko and Jessie Leon
- Producers and Developers: Henk Alberto Schorel, Keith Morrison, Manuel Garrido-Lecca for Solid Gold Music Productions
- Marga Scheide, José Hoebee, Chimène van Oosterhout – vocals
- Ernesto Hermoza – Guitar Espanola, Palmas
- Agustin Espina – Keyboards
- Keith Morrison – Sound Design, Arrangements
- Manuel Garrido-Lecca – Drum Programming, Keyboards
- Eduardo Olive – Palmas
- Engineering in Lima, Peru by Eduardo Olive – EOG Producciones
- Engineering in the Legend Sound Wellington, Florida, USA by Keith Morrison
- Mixed by Keith Morrison at Kokopelli Sound Studio Redland, Florida, USA
- Mastered by Mike Fuller at FullerSound Davie, Florida, USA
- Additional vocals (Chimène van Oosterhout) recorded by Dennis Mulder at D-Recording, Amsterdam, Netherlands

== Track listing ==
- Digital download/streaming
1. "With Him Tonight" – 3:24
