= Hilversum Airfield =

Hilversum Airfield Vliegveld Hilversum
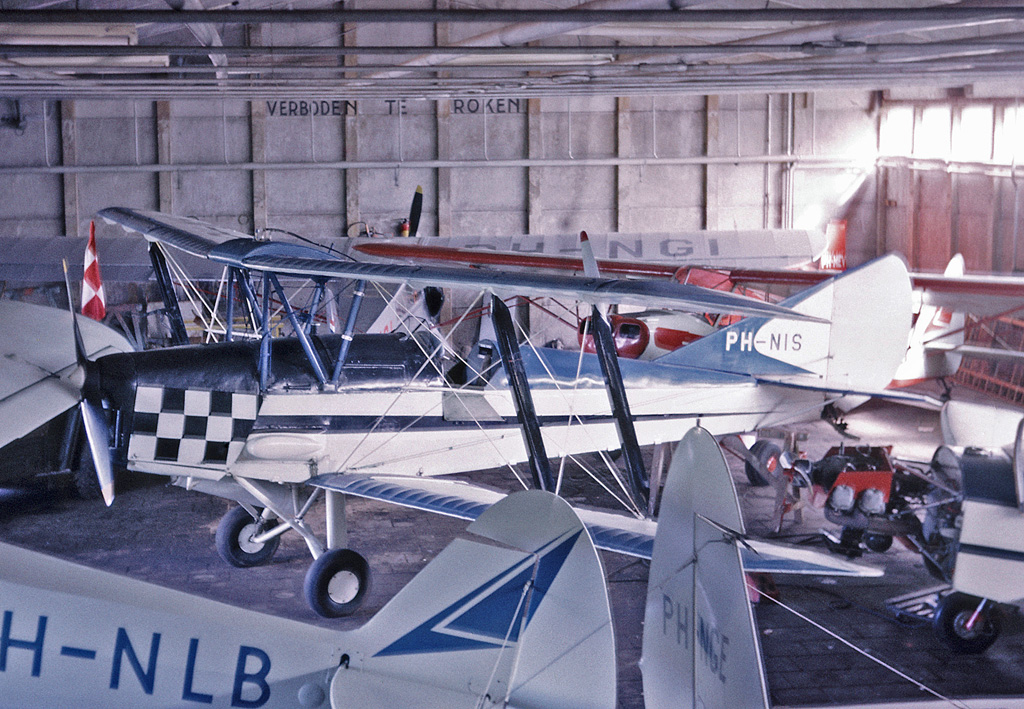
- Aircraft inside the crowded hangar in 1967
- IATA: none; ICAO: EHHV

Summary
- Airport type: Public
- Operator: Stichting Vliegveld Hilversum
- Serves: Hilversum, Netherlands
- Elevation AMSL: 3 ft / 1 m
- Coordinates: 52°11′31″N 005°08′49″E
- Website: www.ehhv.nl
- Interactive map of Hilversum Airfield

Runways
Direction	Length		Surface
Direction	m	ft	Surface
07/25	600	1,969	Grass
12/30	660	2,165	Grass
18/36	700	2,297	Grass
- Source: AIP from AIS the Netherlands

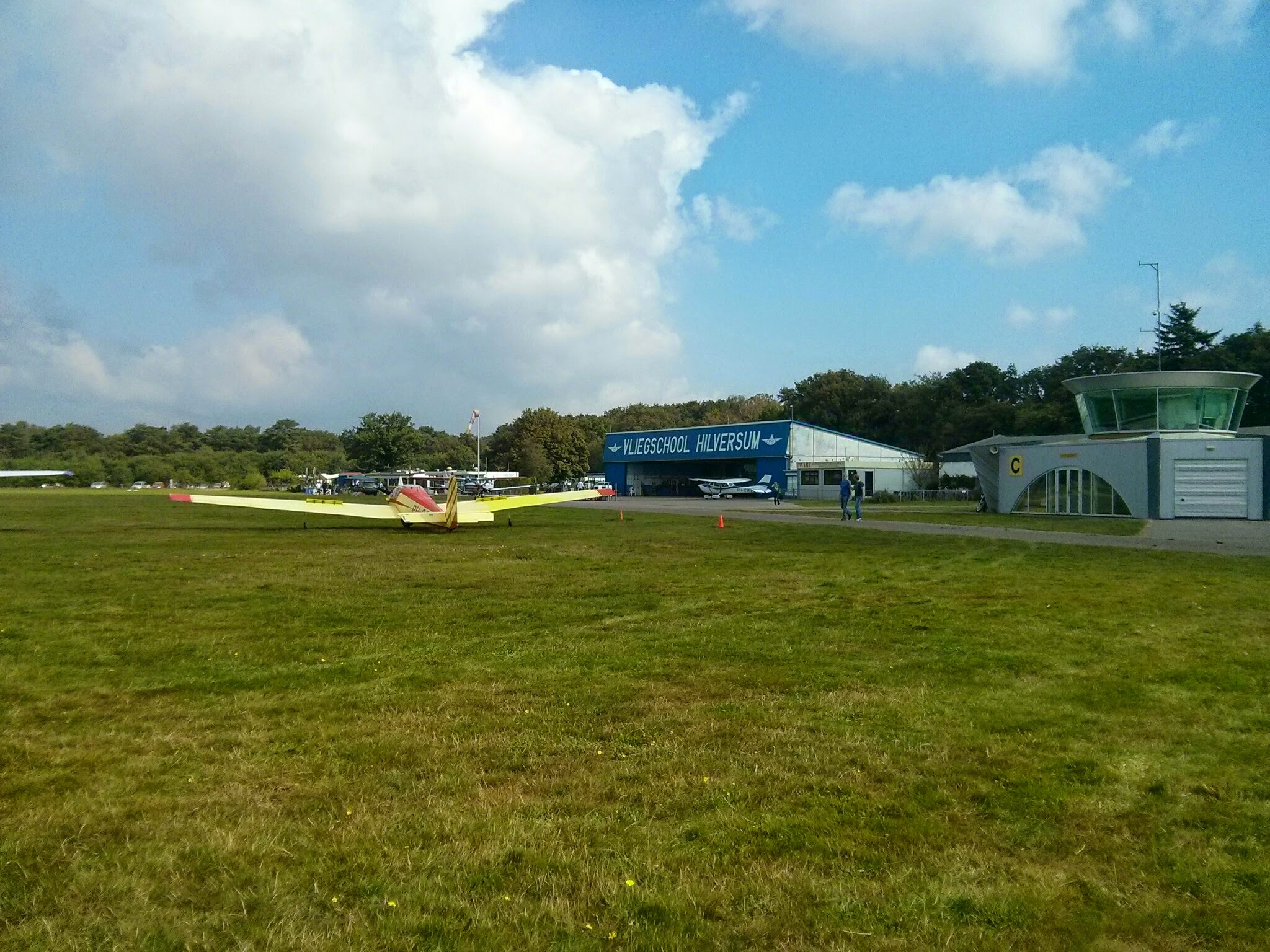
Hilversum airfield

Hilversum Airfield (Dutch: Vliegveld Hilversum) (ICAO: EHHV) is a general aviation aerodrome 2.2 NM (4.1 km; 2.5 mi) south-southwest of Hilversum, a municipality and town in the Gooi region and the province of North Holland in the Netherlands. The airfield is used for general aviation including gliding and for parachuting.

The field has three grass runways, 07/25, 12/30 and 18/36 with the respective lengths of 600 m (1,969 ft), 660 m (2,165 ft) and 700 m (2,297 ft). The majority of flights are with smaller single-engine piston aircraft, either for training or recreational purposes. There have been rumours of a hard runway, but as of 2020 no concrete plans have been announced.

Though founded in 1939 with civil aviation in mind, because of the unrest in Europe, the Royal Netherlands Air Force took control of the airfield, using it as a base for Fokker C-5, Fokker C-10 and Koolhoven F.K.51 aircraft. On the 10 and 11 May 1940, the airfield came under heavy attack by Luftwaffe Messerschmitt Bf 109 aircraft. After Germany occupied the Netherlands later that month, they expanded the airfield significantly for further military use.

As it became clear that the field was going to be lost to Allied forces, German military destroyed most of the field, to prevent use by the Allied forces. After the war, the field remained briefly under military control, but reopened to civil traffic in 1948.
