= U.O.Me (Theme from Waldolala) =

1978 single by Luv'

Single by Luv'

from the album With Luv'
- B-side: "Hang On"
- Released: February 1978
- Recorded: 1977/1978
- Genre: Disco, Pop
- Length: 2:55
- Label: Philips Records/Phonogram Records (Benelux, German-speaking countries, France)
- Songwriters: Hans van Hemert & Piet Souer (as Janschen & Janschens)
- Producer: Hans van Hemert

Luv' singles chronology
"Dream, Dream" (1977)	"'U.O.Me'" (1978)	"You're the Greatest Lover" (1978)

"U.O.Me" is the third single by the Dutch girl group Luv', released in early 1978 by Philips Records. It appears on the 1978 debut album With Luv', and was the trio's breakthrough in Benelux. This record is also credited as "U.O.Me (You Owe Me)", "U.O.Me (Welcome to Waldolala)" or "U.O.Me (Theme from Waldolala)".

== Background ==
Record producer Hans van Hemert was commissioned by TV channel VPRO to write the theme song for the series Het is weer zo laat! (aka Waldolala). Assisted by Piet Souer, he composed "U.O.Me (Welcome To Waldolala)" which was recorded by Luv'. Het is weer zo laat! featured the trio performing the theme song during the opening credits.

"U.O.Me" was Luv's first mainstream success. Its disco-carnival sound changed from the pop arrangements of the two previous singles "My Man" and "Dream, Dream". This track was inspired by "A far l'amore comincia tu", the 1977 European hit performed by Raffaella Carrà. In 2025, the record was remixed as part of Only Luv' – The Matt Pop Remixes.

== Commercial performance ==
Because of Luv's exposure on the Waldolala TV show, the song became an instant hit in the Netherlands and Flanders and reached the singles Top 5 in both countries. It sold 150,000 copies in Benelux.

== Track listing and release ==
7" Vinyl

- a. "U.O.Me"
- b. "Hang On"

Country	Year	Label	Catalog
Netherlands/Germany/Belgium/Philippines/	1978	Philips/Phonogram Records	6012783
France	1978	Philips/Phonogram Records	6173625

== Cover versions ==
- Studio formation Conquistador (also produced by Hans van Hemert and Piet Souer) recorded an instrumental version of this song.
- Schlager singer Peter Petrel recorded a German cover version entitled "Wer Hat Hier Denn Wohl Wen Verführt" in 1978.
- De Strangers recorded a parody in Dutch entitled "'t Sauna Bad" in 1978.
- Finnish girl group Mirumaru performed the track as "Sun Vain Oon" in their language in 1978.
- Dutch act De Vedettes recorded their version of Luv's breakthrough hit to support the Netherlands national football team (the Oranjes) at the 2010 FIFA World Cup. This cover was entitled "Oh! Wat Een Mooie Goal!" (Oh! What a beautiful goal!) and peaked at #39 on the Netherlands' Single Top 100 in July 2010.
- In 2015, Pop singer Tamara Tol released a Dutch language cover version entitled "Dan Gaan We Dansen". The track reached #23 on Oranje Top 30 (a Gfk chart of the 30 most popular Dutch-speaking productions).
- In 2016, Dutch rapper Def Rhymz & Ronnie Ruysdael covered the legendary pop song and named it "Fawaka".
- In January 2018, the TV commercial for breakfast cereals "Granooolala" featured three ladies dressed in 1970s outfits (with Charlie's Angels-like wigs) and lip-syncing to a new version of "U.O.Me".
- In 2025, Dutch transgender entertainer and media personality Sidney Stacey released a "Luv’ Medley", which featured Luv’s classics, including "U.O.Me".

== Charts ==
=== Weekly charts ===
Chart (1978)	Peak position
Europarade (currently Eurochart Hot 100 Singles)	5
Netherlands (Dutch Top 40)	3
Netherlands (Nationale Hitparade, currently Singles Top 100)	3
Belgium/Flanders (BRT Top 30)	2
Belgium/Flanders (Ultratop)	2

=== Year-end charts ===
Chart (1978)	Position
Netherlands (Nationale Hitparade)	10
Netherlands (Dutch Top 40)	21
Belgium/Flanders (Ultratop)	19
