= Trojan Horse (song) =

1978 song by Luv'

Single by Luv'

from the album With Luv' (some editions)
- B-side: "Life Is on My Side"
- Released: November 1978
- Recorded: 1978
- Genre: Pop
- Length: 3:24
- Label: Philips/Phonogram Records(Benelux, France, Spain, Scandinavia, UK, Israel, South Africa, Argentina, Brazil, Australia, New Zealand); Carrere Records(Germany); Polydor Records(USA); Mercury Records (Canada)
- Songwriters: Hans van Hemert and Piet Souer (as Janschen & Janschens)
- Producer: Hans van Hemert

Luv' singles chronology
"You're the Greatest Lover" (1978)	"Trojan Horse" (1978)	"Casanova" (1979)

"Trojan Horse" is the fifth single by the Dutch girl group Luv', released in autumn 1978 by Philips/Phonogram Records. This million-seller appears on some editions of the group's debut album, With Luv' (1978), and was a successful hit record in a large part of continental Europe, Israel, South Africa, Rhodesia, Argentina and New Zealand. It was a minor hit in Australia and Canada.

The single was remixed in 2006, 2015, 2022 and 2025.

== Background ==
This song is the follow-up single to "You're the Greatest Lover" and uses a bagpipe theme. The intro of this track was inspired by the famous "20th-Century Fox Fanfare" by Alfred Newman that accompanies the 20th Century Fox studio logo at the beginning of its productions. Thanks to this hit record, Luv' established itself as one of the most popular Dutch pop acts of the late 1970s.

"Trojan Horse" was included in some editions of the With Luv' album and on CD compilations such as Luv' Gold and 25 Jaar Na Waldolala.

It was used for the soundtrack of the movie Spetters, directed by Paul Verhoeven. In 1979, Luv' played a cameo role in the German movie Cola, Candy, Chocolate in which they performed "Trojan Horse".

== Commercial performance ==
Trojan Horse was a No. 1 hit single in the Netherlands and Flanders (Belgium). It reached the top 5 in Denmark, Austria, Switzerland and Germany, the top 10 in New Zealand and Argentina (where Luv' became a one-hit wonder), the top 20 in Israel, South Africa, Zimbabwe and Finland, the top 50 in France and Australia as well as the top 100 in Canada.

According to a special issue of Billboard magazine about the German recording industry published on December 8, 1979, the single sold 480.000 copies in the Federal Republic of Germany. It also sold 80.000 copies in France, 50.000 copies in Austria (where it turned gold), 100.000 copies in Belgium (gold certification) and 200.000 copies in the Netherlands (platinum certification). In total, more than one million units of the record were sold worldwide.

== Track listing and release ==
Philips/Phonogram licensed the rights for Luv's records to various labels around the world.

7" Vinyl

- a. "Trojan Horse"
- b. "Life Is On My Side"

Countries	Year	Label	Catalog
NL/BEL/AUS/NOR/ARG/AUT/UK/SWE	1978	Philips/Phonogram Records	6012858
France	1978	Philips/Phonogram Records	6173628
Germany	1978	Carrere Records	2044132
USA	1978	Polydor	2095062
Canada	1978	Mercury Records	M-74040
South Africa	1978	Philips/Phonogram Records	TOS 1201
New Zealand	1978	Philips/Phonogram Records	LUVU2

== Cover versions ==
- The German cover band Super Hit Power performed a version of Trojan Horse in 1978.
- In 1979, the Dutch band, De Bumpers, performed a parody entitled "M'n Doedelzak" (lit. ' my bagpipes').
- In 1979, the Swedish female singer, Siw Inger, sang a German version of the song as "Komm und spiel mit mir" (lit. 'come and play with me'). She also covered it in Swedish as "Superman," with different lyrics from the German cover.
- In 1979, Orchester Tony Anderson from Germany recorded a version of the song.
- Singer Glenys Lynne covered the song into Afrikaans under the name "Tsitsikamawoud" in 1979.
- The German cover band, Orchester Tony Anderson, recorded the track for a compilation album "Super Hits '79".
- Disco Light Orchestra from Germany performed an instrumental version for their LP "Disco Sensation" in 1979.
- The German formation, The Golden Akkordeon Harmonists, covered the song for their album "Schlager Hits Akkordeon" in 1979.
- An East German sister duo, Die Molly Sisters, sang a Schlager version of this composition entitled "Im grünen Wald" (lit. 'in the green forest') in 1979.
- King's Group And Singers from the UK recorded their cover of Trojan Horse in 1979.
- German cover band The Hiltonaires recorded a version of Trojan Horse in 1979.
- Romanian group 5T recorded a cover version entitled "Calul Troian" in 1979.
- The Czech girl group, Bezinky, covered the song (entitled "Trojský Kůň") in their language in 1980.
- Juraj Lehotský from Czechoslovakia covered it in 1981.
- In 2001, Estonian group Trobikond, a singing group composed of DJs from the radio station "Raadio Elmar," covered the song in their language as "Üks päev" (lit. 'one day'). This version has new lyrics entitling how everybody has just one day that's their birthday, and has become a well-known birthday song in Estonia.
- A short-lived German girl group, Luv' Connection, covered the track in 2003.
- Kamelie from the Czech Republic performed the song as "Trojský Kůň," with different lyrics from Bezinky's cover, in the 2000s.
- Jump With Me, a song by the Dutch jumpstyle band, the Sheffield Jumpers, featured a re-sung chorus from "Trojan Horse" and was released in August 2008. This version peaked at #69 on the German Media Control Charts.
- In 2009, the entertainer Marco de Hollander sang the song in Dutch and translated it as "Hij speelde elke avond op zijn doedelzak" (lit. 'he played his bagpipes every night').
- In 2010, the Dutch rock and party band Kiek Now Us rendered it as "Hemel Zonder Bier" (lit. 'heaven without beer') in 2010 and reissued it in 2014.
- In 2011, the German-Bosnian act, Engel & Engel, performed it as "So ist die Liebe, mi Amor".
- In 2018, Gáspár Enikő from Hungary covered Trojan Horse in her native language.
- In 2023, Dutch duo Lawineboys covered the song as "Hemelbier".
- In 2025, Dutch transgender entertainer and media personality Sidney Stacey released a "Luv’ Medley", which featured Luv’s classics, including "Trojan Horse".

== Charts and certifications ==
=== Weekly charts ===
Chart (1978–1979)	Peak position	Certification
Argentina (Centro Cultural Del Disco)	9	
Australia (Kent Music Report)	50	
Austria (Ö3 Austria Top 40)	2	Gold
Belgium/Flanders (BRT Top 30)	1	Gold
Belgium/Flanders (Ultratop)	1	Gold
Canada (RPM 100 Singles)	95	
Denmark (BT Hitlisten)	2	
Europarade (currently Eurochart Hot 100 Singles)	3	
Finland (The Official Finnish Charts)	16	
France (SNEP)	22	
Germany (Media Control Charts/Musikmarkt)	3	
Israel (Reshet Gimel-foreign singles chart)	20	
Netherlands (Dutch Top 40)	1	Platinum
Netherlands (Nationale Hitparade (currently Single Top 100)	1	Platinum
New Zealand (NZ Top 40 Singles Chart)	6	
South Africa (Springbok Radio)	17	
Switzerland (Schweizer Hitparade)	2	
Zimbabwe	14	

=== Year-end charts ===
Chart (1978–1979)	Position
Netherlands (Nationale Hitparade) 1978	65
Netherlands (Nationale Hitparade) 1979	34
Netherlands (Dutch Top 40) 1978	68
Netherlands (Dutch Top 40) 1979	124
Belgium/Flanders (Ultratop) 1978	68
Belgium/Flanders (Ultratop) 1979	64
Germany (Media Control Charts/Musikmarkt) 1978	195
Germany (Media Control Charts/Musikmarkt) 1979	15
Switzerland (Schweizer Hitparade) 1979	19
Austria (Ö3 Austria Top 40) 1979	10
Denmark (BT Hitliste) 1979	24
New Zealand (Official Top 40 Singles) 1979	42

== 2006 remix ==
In 2006, Universal Music put out the Completely In Luv' box set including the remastered version of four studio albums: With Luv' (1978), Lots of Luv' (1979), True Luv' (1979) and Forever Yours (1980) on CD. It featured a 2006 remix of Trojan Horse by J.R Beltman and F.M Endenburg.

In 2012, Cloud 9 Music released the compilation entitled "The Best of LUV" which was only available on digital platforms. It included an Extended Mix of Trojan Horse 2006 that was previously unreleased.

== 2015 remix ==
In 2015, Peter Boonstra published the biography The Story Of Luv' (including exclusive pictures of the girl group). DJ/remixer/producer Matt Pop remixed two tracks: "Trojan Horse" and "Life Is On My Side" for the CD compilation included in the book. The Story Of Luv was eventually banned due to copyright issues on some photographs.

== 2022 remix ==
"Trojan Horse (Kav Verhouzer Remix)"

Single by Luv'
- Released: 11 February 2022
- Genre: Dance music
- Label: Cloud 9 Music

Luv' singles chronology
"With Him Tonight" (2019)	"Trojan Horse (Kav Verhouzer Remix)" (2022)	"Luv' Medley (Ladies On Mars Re-Touch Remix)" (2024)

On February 11, 2022, Cloud 9 Music released Trojan Horse (Kav Verhouzer Remix) as a digital single. Two days later, this remix entered the Dutch iTunes Top 100 at #10. One week later, it dropped out of this chart.

=== Track listing ===
Digital download/streaming

1. "Trojan Horse (Kav Verhouzer Remix)" – 2:27
2. "Trojan Horse (Club Mix by Jaz von D) - 2:50

== 2025 remix ==
"Trojan Horse (The Matt Pop Remixes)"

Single by Luv'
- Released: 18 August 2025
- Genre: Dance music
- Label: Only Luv', Concerto Records

Luv' singles chronology
"Don Juanito De Carnaval (Matt Pop Album Remix)" (2025)	"Trojan Horse (The Matt Pop Remixes)" (2025)	"Life Is On My Side (The Matt Pop Remixes)" (2025)

On May 24, 2025, the remix album Only Luv' – The Matt Pop Remixes was released, featuring “Trojan Horse (Matt Pop 2025 Remix),” which was later issued as a digital single on August 18, 2025.

=== Track listing ===
Digital download/streaming

1. "Trojan Horse (Matt Pop 2025 Extended Remix)" – 4:34
2. "Trojan Horse (Matt Pop 2025 Album)" - 3:11
