= You're the Greatest Lover =

1978 single by Luv'

Single by Luv'

from the album With Luv'
- B-side: "Everybody's Shakin' Hands on Broadway"
- Released: July 1978
- Recorded: 1978
- Genre: Pop
- Length: 2:50
- Label: Philips/Phonogram (Benelux, France, Spain, Scandinavia, Japan, Israel, South Africa); Carrere (German speaking countries, UK, Italy); Tonpress (Poland); West (Turkey); Mercury (Canada)
- Songwriters: Hans van Hemert and Piet Souer (as Janschen & Janschens)
- Producer: Hans van Hemert

Luv' singles chronology
"U.O.Me (Theme from Waldolala)" (1978)	"You're the Greatest Lover" (1978)	"Trojan Horse" (1978)

"You're the Greatest Lover" is a single by the Dutch girl group Luv', released in July 1978 by Philips/Phonogram Records. It appears on the 1978 debut album With Luv'. The song is the group's international breakthrough as it was successful in a large part of Continental Europe, Israel and South Africa. Luv' reached its peak with this million-seller. "You're the Greatest Lover" is often considered the signature song of the female pop act.

A decade later, Philips' German subsidiary reissued the track as a CD single.

The record was remixed over the years. In 1993, the Dutch Top 40 hit "Megamix '93" was backed with a Eurodance remix of "The Greatest Lover". In 2025, You're the Greatest Lover was remixed twice, first by the Argentinian remixer Ladies On Mas for the reissue of All You Need Is Luv' and then as part of Only Luv' – The Matt Pop Remixes. In 2026, the Dutch DJ-remixer Otto Wunderbar released a remix for the Après ski and Carnival festivities in the Netherlands.

== Background ==
In the spring of 1978, manager Han Meijer filed a lawsuit against Patty Brard, José Hoebee and Marga Scheide, who were not satisfied with the way he developed their career. Meijer considered the name of the formation as his ownership and took the three singers to court over its use. Finally, in early June 1978, the ladies won the legal action and were officially allowed to be named Luv'. Pim ter Linde became their new manager. They were ready to concentrate on their main goal: to have an international career.
After the success of "U.O.Me" in Benelux, Hans van Hemert and Piet Souer, the group's songwriters, noticed that the light pop/disco and Latin American arrangements were more appropriate than a more serious repertoire (like the trio's first singles). They composed "You're the Greatest Lover", which featured Spanish guitars. It became a big-selling record as it entered the charts in a dozen countries. This track was the first of a string of international hit singles. It reached the first position in some countries in Continental Europe. It was entitled "Sing Me, Sing Me a Chanson" to adapt the French market and succeeded in reaching the Top 20 in South Africa. A Spanish version (entitled "Eres Mi Mejor Amante") was recorded, which permitted Luv' to have a hit in Spain.

Because Luv' performed "You're the Greatest Lover" on two famous German TV music shows (Disco and Musikladen), the female pop trio became a household group in German-speaking countries. The song, which sold 650.000 units in Germany, was part of the soundtrack of the fifty-fourth episode (entitled "Anschlag auf Bruno") of Derrick.

The track was also used over the credits of a 1979 German sex comedy film called Sunnyboy und Sugarbaby, which received significant late-night airplay in the early days of HBO under its English-language title, She's 19 and Ready. The song was also popular behind the Iron Curtain, especially in East Germany, Poland and Hungary as it was frequently aired on communist radio stations. However, records distribution was limited in the Eastern Bloc. Sales were hard to evaluate in this part of the world.

== Commercial performance ==
"You're the Greatest Lover" was a #1 hit single in the Netherlands, Flanders (Belgium), Germany, and Switzerland. The Spanish version of the song "Tu Eres Mi Mejor Amante" also hit the number-one spot in Spain.

The single was also successful in Austria and to a lesser extent in France, Finland, Israel and South Africa. Because of the good performance in the above-mentioned territories, the record reached the 5th position of the Europarade (currently the European Hot 100 Singles), which combined the weekly charts of various European countries into a single countdown.

According to a special issue of Billboard about the German recording industry published on December 8, 1979, the single sold 650.000 copies in the Federal Republic of Germany (where it turned gold). It also sold 80.000 copies in France and 150.000 copies in the Netherlands (platinum certification). More than one million units of the record were sold worldwide.

== 1989 reissue, appearance on compilations and 1993 remix ==
"You're the Greatest Lover"

Single by Luv'
- Released: 1989
- Recorded: 1978
- Genre: Pop; disco
- Label: Philips Germany
- Songwriters: Hans van Hemert and Piet Souer (a.k.a. Janschen & Janschens)
- Producer: Hans van Hemert

Luv' singles chronology
"4 Gouden Hits" (1989)	"You're the Greatest Lover" (1989)	"Luv' Hitpack" (1989)

In 1989, Luv' was reformed by original member Marga Scheide and two other vocalists to promote new recordings released by Dureco Records. At the same time, Luv's first record company, Philips, decided to repackage the old repertoire of the pop act. That's why a mini CD single came out in Germany only, which included three songs from the original group's back catalogue: the 1978 number one hits "You're the Greatest Lover" and "Trojan Horse" as well as the disco track "Everybody's Shakin' Hands on Broadway". In 1993, a dance remix was included on the single "Megamix '93". Moreover, due to its popularity, "The Greatest Lover" was part of the track listings of Luv's main compilations (Greatest Hits, Luv' Gold, 25 Jaar Na Waldolala and Completely in Luv').

== You're The Greatest Lover (Ladies on Mars Re-Construction Mix) ==
"You're The Greatest Lover (Ladies on Mars Re-Construction Mix)"

Single by Luv'

from the album All You Need Is Luv' (Remastered & Expanded Edition )
- Released: 17 January 2025
- Genre: Dance pop, Dance music, nu disco
- Label: Hit It! Music

Luv' singles chronology
"Don't Stop Now (Ladies On Mars Remix)" (2024)	"You're The Greatest Lover (Ladies on Mars Re-Construction Mix)" (2025)	"Let's Go To The Paradise Of Love (Ladies On Mars Remix)" (2025)

You're The Greatest Lover (Ladies On Mars Extended Re-Construction Mix)
- Cover of "You're The Greatest Lover (Ladies On Mars Extended Re-Construction Mix)"

Dutch label Hit It! Music released "You're The Greatest Lover (Ladies on Mars Re-Construction Mix)" on January 17, 2025. Created by Argentinian producer Ladies On Mars, the remix was a modern rework of Luv’s classic hit and followed three earlier remixes (Luv' Medley (Ladies On Mars Re-Touch Remix), Don't Stop Now (Ladies On Mars Remix) and Don't Stop Now (Ladies On Mars Extended Remix) tied to All You Need Is Luv' (Remastered & Expanded Edition). Unlike the original version, the remix did not feature the original master vocals, as the rights to the original recordings belonged to producer Hans van Hemert. Instead, Ladies On Mars used a re-recording of the song made by Luv's original lineup (José Hoebee, Marga Scheide, and Patty Brard), which was first included in the Luv' Medley on the original edition of All You Need Is Luv' in 1994. This version captured the group’s signature harmonies and energy but reflected their matured vocal sound from the 1990s era.

An extended remix of the song by Ladies On Mars came out on January 31st, 2025.

=== Music video ===
A music video for the remix premiered on YouTube on 16 January 2025, one day before the single’s release. It featured excerpts from Luv's TV performances of "You're the Greatest Lover" between 1978 and 1993.

== You're The Greatest Lover (Matt Pop Album Remix) ==
"You're The Greatest Lover (Matt Pop Album Remix)"

Single by Luv'
- Released: 13 June 2025
- Genre: Dance music
- Label: Only Luv', Concerto Records

Luv' singles chronology
"Eeny Meeny Miny Moe / I.M.U.R. / Si Que Si – The Matt Pop Remixes EP" (2025)	"You're The Greatest Lover (Matt Pop Album Remix)" (2025)	"Don Juanito de Carnaval (Matt Pop Album Remix)" (2025)

On May 24, 2025, the remix album Only Luv' – The Matt Pop Remixes was released, featuring “You're The Greatest Lover (Matt Pop Album Remix),” which was later issued as a digital single on June 13, 2025.

== You're The Greatest Lover (Otto Wunderbar Remix) ==
"You're The Greatest Lover (Otto Wunderbar Remix)"

Single by Luv'
- Released: 30 January 2026
- Genre: Dance music
- Label: Wunder Music, Cloud 9

Luv' singles chronology
"Life Is On My Side (Matt Pop Remixes)" (2025)	"You're The Greatest Lover (Otto Wunderbar Remix)" (2026)

On January 30, 2026, Wunder Music, a division of the Dutch label Cloud 9 Recordings B.V, released "You're The Greatest Lover (Otto Wunderbar Remix)".

== Formats and track listings ==
Philips/Phonogram licensed the rights for Luv's records to various labels around the world.

=== 1978 original release: 7-inch vinyl ===
1. "You're the Greatest Lover" – 2:50
2. "Everybody's Shaking Hands on Broadway" – 3:27

Countries	Year	Label	Catalog number
Netherlands/Belgium/Spain/New Zealand/Norway	1978	Philips/Phonogram Records	6012828
France	1978	Philips/Phonogram Records	6173627
Germany	1978	Carrere Records	2044122
Italy	1978	Carrere Records	CAR OO1
UK	1978	Carrere Records/EMI	EMI 2888
Poland	1978	Tonpress	735
Canada	1978	Mercury Records	M-76005
South Africa	1978	Philips/Phonogram Records	TOS 1192
Japan	1978	Carrere Records	SFL 2374
Turkey	1978	West	W 29
Brazil	1979	Philips/Phonogram Records	6012898

=== 1989 reissue: mini CD single ===
1. "You're the Greatest Lover"
2. "Everybody's Shaking Hands on Broadway"
3. "Trojan Horse"

Country	Year	Label
Germany	1989	Philips Records

=== Digital download/streaming ===
You're The Greatest Lover (Ladies on Mars Re-Construction Mix)

1. "You're The Greatest Lover (Ladies on Mars Re-Construction Mix)" – 3:04
2. "You're The Greatest Lover (Ladies On Mars Extended Re-Construction Mix)" - 5:15

You're The Greatest Lover (Matt Pop Album Remix)

1. "You're The Greatest Lover (Matt Pop Album Remix)" – 4:16

You're The Greatest Lover (Otto Wunderbar Remix)

1. "You're The Greatest Lover (Otto Wunderbar Remix)" – 2:31

== Cover versions ==
- In 1978, Ulla Norden covered the song in German as "Wir Sind Verrückt (Wir Beide)".
- In 1978, the cover band The Hiltonaires recorded "You're the Greatest Lover" on German compilations "Hits For Young People 18" and "Top Disco"
- In 1979, Jonathan King recorded a cover version of Luv's hit that peaked at #67 on the UK Singles Charts.
- Disco Light Orchestra from Germany performed an instrumental version for their LP Disco Sensation in 1979.
- Franz Lambert performed "You're the Greatest Lover" on the German compilation "Pop-Orgel Hitparade 4" in 1979.
- James Last orchestra performed an instrumental version on his album New Non Stop Dancing 79.
- Teenage singer Eini covered the song (entitled "Vetonaula") in Finnish in 1979.
- Finnish cover band Taru recorded the song as "Vetonaula" on the Disco City 3 compilation in 1979.
- Finnish cover band Disco Ape recorded a version of "You're the Greatest Lover" in 1979.
- Irish pop group Gina, Dale Haze and the Champions had a top 10 hit with this song on the Irish Charts in 1979.
- In 1979, German singer Karl Dall sang it as "Hey Hallo, Ich Bin Die Größte Nummer".
- In 1980, British group Brotherhood of Man recorded a version of the song for their Good Fortune album.
- East German sister duet, Die Molly Sisters, sang a German version entitled "He, hallo, du bist ein Mann geworden".
- Accordion duo Kirmesmusikanten covered the track for the "28 Super-Sommer-Sonnen-Hits non-stop" compilation released in the Netherlands and Germany in 1985.
- In 1994, German female singer Angie van Burg covered it as "Wir Sind Verrückt (Wir Beide)".
- The Hallmond All Stars orchestra performed an instrumental version on the compilation Night Fever Hammond Hit Parade released in the UK in 1996.
- In 1999, Kristina Bach sang a Schlager version (entitled "Hey, ich such' hier nicht den größten Lover").
- In 2000, a dance music oriented cover by Loona renamed "Latino Lover" was a Top 10 hit single in German speaking countries (#6 and gold single (250 000 units sold) in Germany, #9 in Austria and #6 in Switzerland).
- In 2002, Rob Ronalds covered it in Dutch as "Kanjer". His version reached #57 on the Dutch Single Top 100.
- German industrial band Massiv in Mensch recorded an electro version in 2004.
- In 2004, Dutch girl group Glamourama recorded a medley entitled "Greatest Lovers" that included "You're the Greatest Lover".
- In 2005, the version of "The Greatest Lover" by Flemish dance group Swoop peaked at #25 on the Ultratop singles charts in Flanders.
- In 2008, Renate Fuchs' version in German was entitled "Hey, kumm loss m'r Fastelovend fiere".
- In 2016, Dutch act Huub Hangop feat. DJ Maurice sang it as "Ik wil met jou een selfie".
- In 2016, German singer Jack Gelee covered it as "Ich will mit Dir ein Selfie".
- In 2016, German act Feierwut performed a version entitled "Hey Hallo wir sind heut auf Mallorca".
- In 2020, Dutch Drag act RisQGay aka Pëtros Éfthafstos released a single entitled "The Greatest Latino Lover" (a cover version and mashup of Latino Lover by Loona and You're the Greatest Lover by Luv'). This cover version was remixed in 2024 as "The Greatest Latino Lover '24 (Club Mix)" and in 2025 as "The Greatest Latino Lover '25 (Club Remix)".
- In 2021, Dutch act Bert & Vief covered it as "De Grootste Liefhebber".
- In 2022, Dutch singer Johnny Gold covered it as "Hey Hallo (je bent de grootste lovert)".
- In 2022, German DJ Clubstone recorded an EDM version entitled "Greatest Lover".
- In 2025, Dutch transgender entertainer and media personality Sidney Stacey released a "Luv’ Medley", which featured Luv’s classics, including "You’re the Greatest Lover".
- In 2026, Pëtros released "The Greatest Lover (Malie Remix '26)".

== Charts ==
=== Weekly charts ===
Weekly chart performance for "You're the Greatest Lover"
Chart (1978–1979)	Peak position
Austria (Ö3 Austria Top 40)	2
Belgium/Flanders (BRT Top 30)	1
Belgium/Flanders (Ultratop)	1
Europarade (currently European Hot 100 Singles)	5
Finland (The Official Finnish Charts)	26
France (SNEP)	19
Germany (Media Control/Musikmarkt Charts)	1
Israel (Reshet Gimel-foreign singles chart)	19
Netherlands (Dutch Top 40)	1
Netherlands (Nationale Hitparade)	1
South Africa (Springbok Radio)	15
Spain (Clasificacion Nacional Del Disco)	1
Switzerland (Schweizer Hitparade)	1

=== Year-end charts ===
Year-end chart performance for "You're the Greatest Lover"
Chart (1978)	Position
Belgium/Flanders (Ultratop)	10
Germany (Media Control Charts/Musikmarkt)	62
Netherlands (Dutch Top 40)	7
Netherlands (Nationale Hitparade)	11
Switzerland (Schweizer Hitparade)	18

Chart (1979)	Position
Austria (Ö3 Austria Top 40)	14
Germany (Media Control Charts/Musikmarkt)	44

== Certifications ==
Certifications and sales for "You're the Greatest Lover"
Region	Certification	Certified units/sales
Germany (BVMI)	Gold	500,000^{^}
Netherlands (NVPI)	Gold	100,000^{^}
^{^} Shipments figures based on certification alone.
