= Top 30 (Belgium) =

Belgian weekly music chart

Top 30 brand logo in 2013

The Top 30 (also known previously as the BRT Top 30 and today as both the Radio 2 Top 30 and the VRT Top 30) is a Belgian weekly music record chart compiled by the Vlaamse Radio- en Televisieomroeporganisatie (VRT) network and broadcast every Saturday on its station Radio 2. It debuted on 2 May 1970, with "Spirit in the Sky" by Norman Greenbaum as its first number-one song.

It was the pre-eminent music industry standard chart for Flanders (the Dutch-speaking part of Belgium) until January 1995, when the Ultratop 50 was established. However, the Top 30 continues to be compiled to the present day, and as such has become the longest-running music chart in Belgium.

== Top 30 records ==
- Most singles in the Top 30
  - Madonna: 52
  - Will Tura: 47
  - Michael Jackson: 46
  - Queen: 40
  - Prince: 33
  - Cliff Richard: 32
  - Clouseau: 32
  - Rod Stewart: 31
  - Tina Turner: 29
  - Kylie Minogue: 29
  - U2: 28
  - Elton John: 27
  - Whitney Houston: 27
  - ABBA: 26
  - Bee Gees: 25
  - Paul McCartney: 25
  - Rolling Stones: 25
  - David Bowie: 25
- Most weeks spent in the Top 30
  - Madonna: 497
  - Michael Jackson: 423
  - Will Tura: 346
  - Clouseau: 320
  - Natalia: 316
  - K3: 305
  - Marco Borsato: 292
  - Celine Dion: 282
  - ABBA: 280
  - Belle Perez: 266
  - Kylie Minogue: 250
  - Queen: 249
  - Shakira: 239
  - Britney Spears: 231
  - Tina Turner: 221
  - Robbie Williams: 219
  - Elton John: 213
  - Whitney Houston: 211
  - Willy Sommers: 205
  - Phil Collins: 202
  - Rod Stewart: 201
  - Mika: 200

== See also ==
- List of number-one hits (Belgium)
- Ultratop 50
