= José Hoebee =

Dutch singer (born 1954)

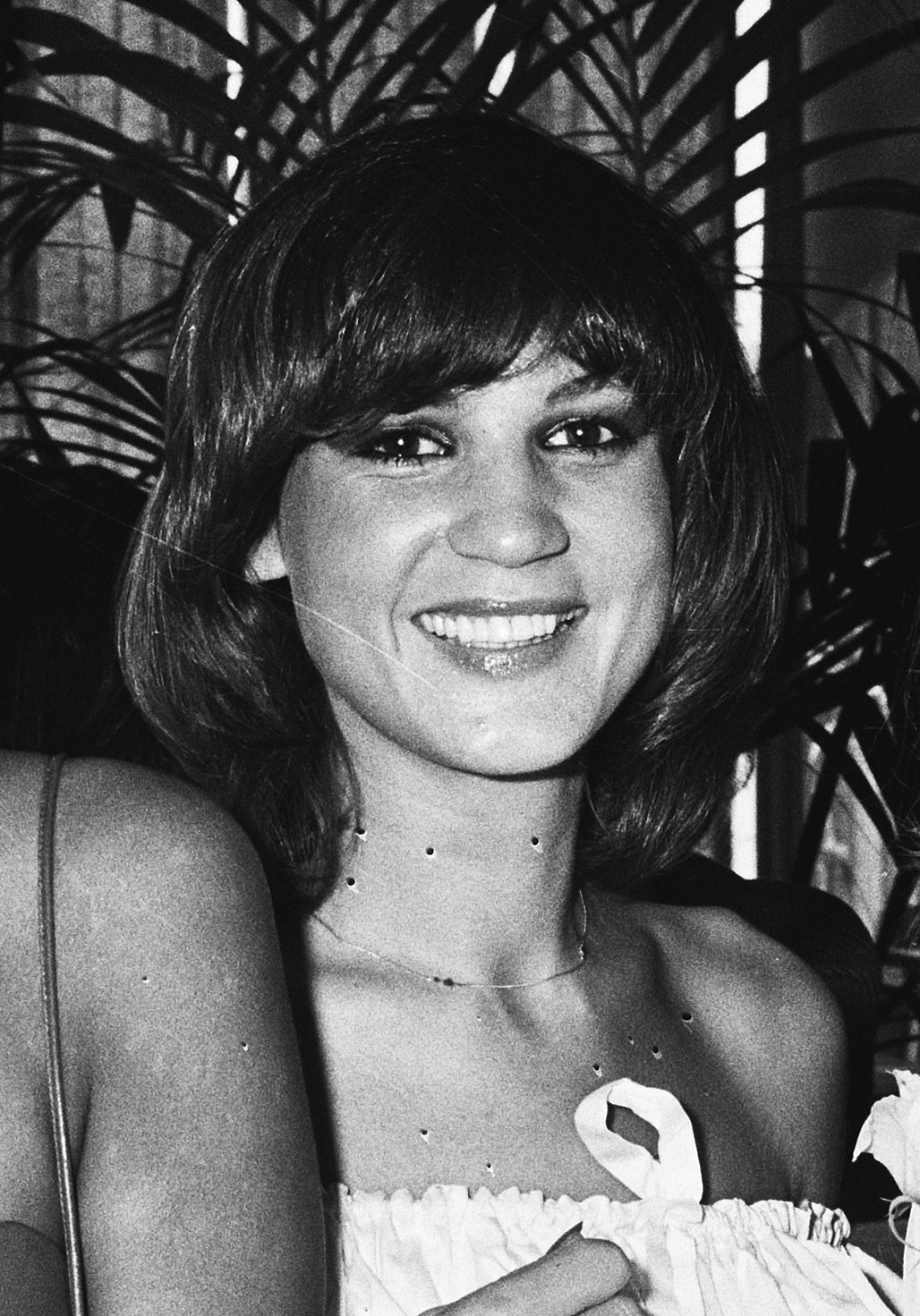
- Hoebee in 1979

Background information
- Also known as: José; José Andreoli
- Born: Josina van de Wijdeven; 29 March 1954 (age 72); Best, Netherlands
- Genres: Pop
- Occupation: Singer
- Instrument: Singing
- Years active: 1970–2019
- Labels: Carrere, RCA, WVS Music, Marista
- Formerly of: Luv'

Josina van de Wijdeven (born 29 March 1954), known as José Hoebee, is a Dutch pop singer. She was a member of Luv' in the late 1970s and early 1980s that scored hits in more than 15 countries. In late 1981, she went solo and was successful in her homeland and in the Flanders region of Belgium between 1982 and 1985. She formed a duo known as Bonnie & José with Bonnie St. Claire to record Dutch cover versions of ABBA's songs.

Luv' went through line-up changes and reunited several times. On 7 February 2020 the group's management announced that Luv' would stop all their activities due to José's ill health.

== Career ==
=== Pre-Luv' career ===
At age 15, José van de Wijdeven made her debut in a folk & country band (Young Tradition) with her two sisters (Marijke and Yvonne) and her best friend Ad van Genechten. This group toured the folk circuit in North Brabant. Young Tradition covered folk classics initially performed by Bob Dylan, Donovan, Joan Baez and Leonard Cohen. In 1971, the quartet was discovered by Piet Souer on a talent show "Het cabaret der onbekenden" (the cabaret of the unknowns) in Eindhoven. Around the same time, they also performed on Ted de Braak's popular radio show "Van twaalf tot twee" on KRO. On 19 August 1972, Young Tradition took part in the final of the TV talent show "Nieuwe Oogst" (New Harvest) as part of the Drieluik program on AVRO channel and finished second. In 1976, José, Marijke, and Yvonne formed a new group named after the first single they recorded with Piet Souer: "Elongi". It was a cover version of a Makossa and World Music classic initially performed by Cameroonian singer Ekambi Brillant in 1975. Elongi's version, recorded by the Van de Wijdeven sisters, had English lyrics written by Piet Souer. It came out in the Spring of 1976 and flopped.

=== The Luv' years ===
From 1977 to 1981, Luv' (Marga Scheide, Patty Brard (replaced in August 1980 by Ria Thielsch) and José Hoebee) scored a string of hit records in a large part of Continental Europe (Benelux, Germany, Switzerland, Austria, Denmark, Finland, Norway, France, Spain) as well as Israel, South Africa, Zimbabwe, Australia, New Zealand, Canada, Argentina and Mexico. In March 1981, the group disbanded.

Luv' went through line-up changes in the late 1980s and 1990s, without José Hoebee.

The original Luv' singers reunited twice (in 1993–1996 and in 2005–2012). In March 2016, Scheide, Hoebee and Thielsch announced another comeback of Luv' in De Telegraaf. The trio toured the nostalgia circuit in the Netherlands and Flanders (Belgium). On 4 January 2019 media personality Chimène van Oosterhout officially replaced Ria Thielsch. In July 2019, Luv' released a Latin pop-reggaeton single entitled With Him Tonight with Latin Grammy-nominated producers Keith Morrison and Manuel Garrido-Lecca.

On 7 February 2020, Luv' (which had not performed since September 2019 due to José Hoebee's illness) informed the media and the public about the interruption of their activities.

=== Post Luv' career ===
After Luv' split up, Hoebee went solo and married record producer Will Hoebee. The wedding reception took place in David Soul's villa in Los Angeles.

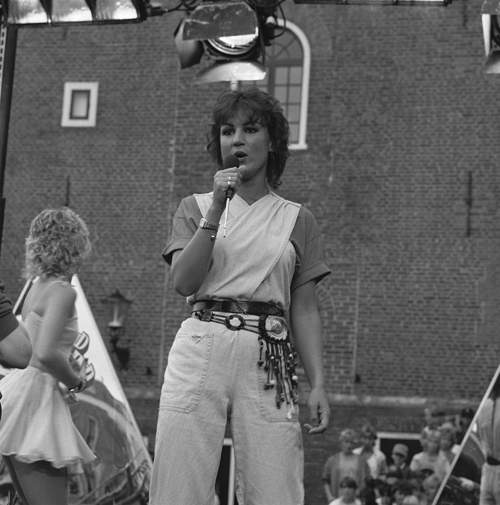
Hoebee at Nederland Muziekland, 17 August 1983

Twelve of her singles (among them a #1 hit and duets) entered the record charts; twelve in the Netherlands and five in Flanders. Hoebee was the first female singer who had #1 hits on the Dutch Top 40 as a member of a group (Luv') and as a solo artist.

In 2005, WVS Music released her first compilation Alle Hits & Unieke Bonustracks. This anthology includes the singer's greatest hits, b-sides, album tracks and bonus tracks. In 2009, she covered "Be My Baby", rendered as a duet with former BZN member Anny Schilder and produced by Will Hoebee and Piet Souer.

In March 2011, Hoebee re-recorded "I Will Follow Him" with Peggy March, who originally had a #1 hit with the song in 1963. The two singers appeared on several Dutch television programmes. The release of the song, however, was delayed one year later and finally came out on the German edition of March's album Always And Forever together with an original track "My Christmas Wish".

In January 2013, she took part in Sterren Dansen Op Het Ijs (SBS6 celebrity figure skating show).

In June 2014, Hoebee released "Noheyo", a cover version of a 2011 single by Polish band Blue Café.

=== Bonnie & José: the ABBA project ===
Long before the revival of interest in ABBA's music (Abba-esque by Erasure, ABBA Gold, Mamma Mia! (musical)...), Bonnie St. Claire and José Hoebee decided to form a duo to record songs of the Swedish Fab Four in Dutch in 1984. Their first collaboration was "Cassandra" (originally the B-side of ABBA's hit "The Day Before You Came" in late 1982). Bonnie & José's cover of Cassandra reached #19 on the Nationale Hitparade and #24 on the Dutch Top 40.

In late 1984 and early 1985, Bonnie & José were part of the Dutch cast of the Abbacadabra musical with Ron Brandsteder, Benny Neyman, Marga Scheide, Nico Haak, Willem Duijn, Bianca Folkers, and Nancy Dubbeldam.

In 1985, the duo scored another hit: "Zoals Vrienden Doen" (the Dutch cover of ABBA's The Way Old Friends Do), which became their signature song. This version peaked at #18 on the Nationale Hitparade and #36 on the Dutch Top 40.

In the autumn of 1985, Bonnie & José put out the full-length album "Herinnering".

On 20 November 2020, the independent label CD-Licious reissued "Herinnering" on CD and DVD thanks to a crowdfunding campaign.

== Background vocals ==
Hoebee worked as a backup singer for other artists including:

- Babe: "Tick-A-Thums-My-Heart" (performed with Marga Scheide and produced by Hans van Hemert) – taken from the album Blitzers (TTR, 1981)
- David Soul: "That’s enough for me" – taken from the album The Best Days of My Life (Philips, 1981)
- Doris D & The Pins: "I wanna be loved by you", "The Marvellous Marionettes", "Bad luck Honey", "Higher and Higher" – taken from the album Doris D and the Pins (Utopia, 1981)
- Bloem: "Ik wil alleen bij jou zijn", "Omdat" – taken from the album Bloemstukken (CNR, 1982)
- Lucy Steymel: "Midnight", "Red-handed", "You’re breaking my heart woman", "Night without you" – taken from the album Three's A Charm (CBS, 1982)
- Nancy Dubbelman: "Tonight you belong to me" (Carrere, 1983)
- Dianne Marchal: "It’s my time now" (Carrere, 1983)
- Benny Neyman: "Een dag in Parijs" – taken from the album Het Zwarte Goud (CNR, 1984)
- Tina Selini: "I know about you", "All of my life", "Just in Time" – taken from the album Tina Selini (RCA, 1988)
- Nikos Ignatiadis: "Timmy’s song" – taken from the album The Olympous Symphony (CNR, 1988)
- Johan Vlemmix: "Neuro van de euro" (Hollandia Music, 2016)

== Discography ==
=== Singles ===
- "Elongi" (Philips, 1976)
- "I'm So Sorry" (Carrere, 1981)
- "I Will Follow Him" (Carrere, 1982)
- "Secret Love" (Carrere, 1982)
- "The Good Times" (Carrere, 1982)
- "I Can Hear Music" (Carrere, 1983)
- "Hey Now, Watcha Gonna Do" (Carrere, 1983)
- "So Long, Marianne" (with Ron Brandsteder, CNR, 1984)
- "Time Goes By" (Carrere, 1984)
- "Cassandra" (with Bonnie St. Claire, Philips, 1984)
- "Wij Zijn Vrij" (taken from the ABBAcadabra TV musical, Indisc, 1984)
- "I Love You" (CNR, 1984)
- "Zoals Vrienden Doen" (with Bonnie St. Claire, RCA, 1985)
- "Waarom" (with Bonnie St. Claire, RCA, 1985)
- "De Flierefluiter" (with Bonnie St. Claire, RCA, 1986)
- "Herinnering" (with Bonnie St. Claire, RCA, 1986)
- "All Around My Hat" (RCA, 1986)
- "In The Sign of Love" (Corduroy, 1987)
- "N Engel Als Jij" (with Bonnie St. Claire, Bunny Music Bucs/Dino, 1994)
- "Walk Away Renée" (as STUFF, download on internet, 2003)
- "I Will Follow Him" (WVS Music, 2006)
- "Be My Baby" (Marista, 2009)
- "My Christmas Wish" (with Peggy March, Night Dance Records, digital single, 2012)
- "Noheyo" (MAP Records, digital single, 2014)
- "Who's Sorry Now?" (Hit It! Music, digital single, 2014)

=== Albums ===
- The Good Times (Carrere, 1982)
- Herinnering (with Bonnie St. Claire, RCA, 1985) – reissue on CD/DVD (CD-Licious, 2020)
- Alle Hits & Unieke Bonustracks (compilation, WVS Music, 2005)

Guest appearances on other albums:

  - Niet Alleen by Ron Brandsteder (CNR, 1983 / including "So Long Marianne")
  - Abbacadabra (Dutch version, Indisc, 1984)
  - Nederland Muziekland – 14 'Nooitgedachte' Hoogtepunten (CNR, 1986)
  - Wie Gaat Er Me Naar Dinoland(Dino, 1993)
  - Marjan Berger Meets Doris Day(2003)
  - Always and Forever by Peggy March (2012 reissue, Night Dance Records/DA-Music / including a new version of "I Will Follow Him" and "My Christmas Wish")

=== Notable record charts ===
Year	Title	Chart positions			
Year	Title	Europarade	NL (Top 40)	NL (Nationale Hitparade)	B (FL)
1981	"I'm So Sorry"	-	-	39	-
1982	"I Will Follow Him"	6	1	2	1
1982	"Secret Love"	19	11	14	3
1982	"The Good Times"	-	-	37	28
1983	"I Can Hear Music"	-	-	48	13
1984	"So Long, Marianne" [José & Ron Brandsteder]	-	11	6	20
1984	"Time Goes By"	-	-	16	-
1984	"Cassandra" [Bonnie & José]	-	24	19	-
1985	"Zoals Vrienden Doen" [Bonnie & José]	-	36	18	-
1985	"Waarom" [Bonnie & José]	-	-	35	-
2006	"I Will Follow Him 2005"	-	-	90	-
2009	"Be My Baby" [Anny & José]	-	-	92	-
