= Hans van Hemert =

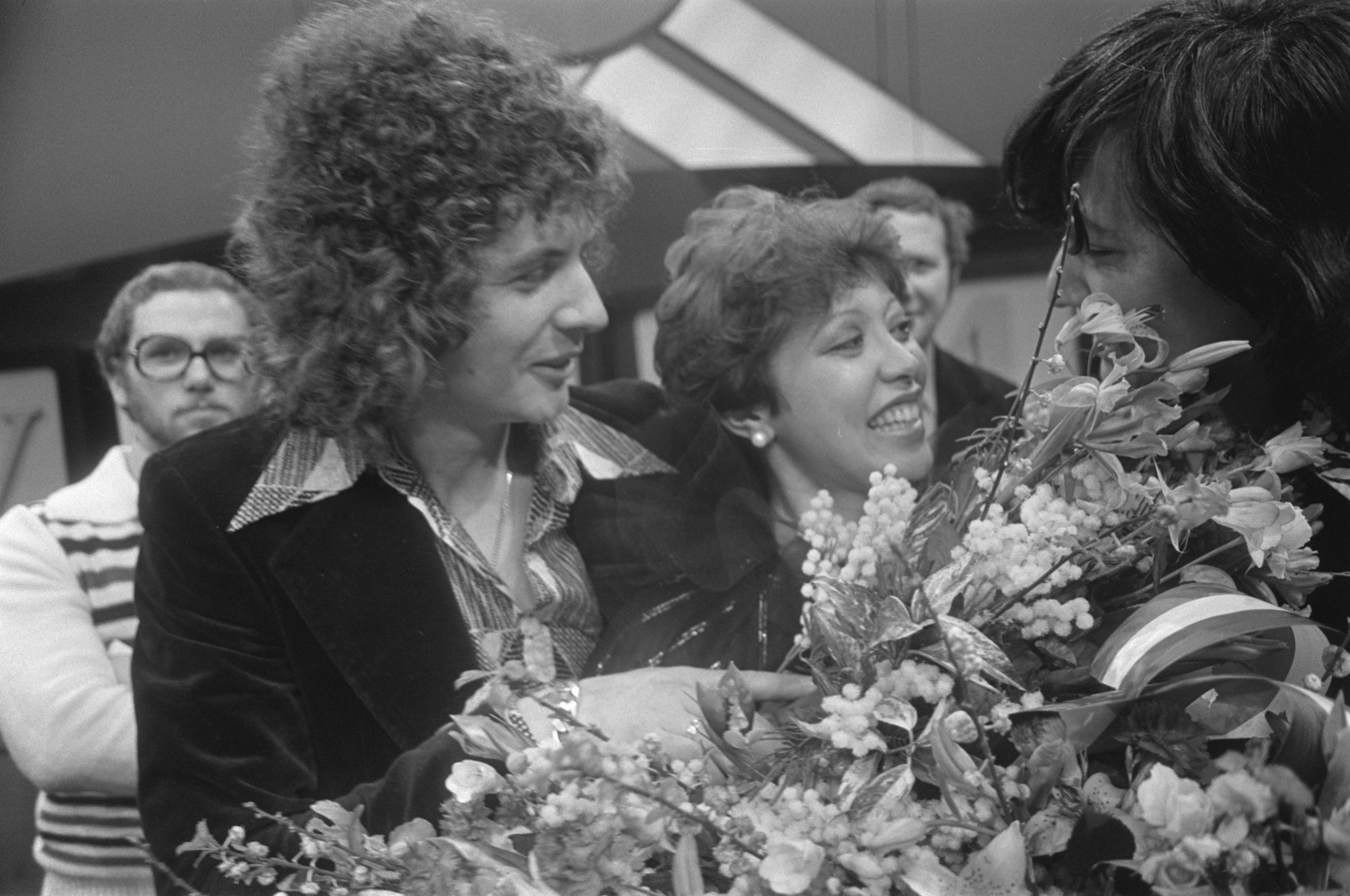
- Van Hemert and Sandra Reemer in 1976

Background information
- Born: 7 April 1945; Voorburg, German-occupied Netherlands
- Died: 7 October 2024 (aged 79); Hilversum, Netherlands
- Genres: Pop
- Occupations: Songwriter; record producer
- Years active: 1965–2024
- Website: www.hansvanhemert.nl

Hans van Hemert (7 April 1945 – 7 October 2024) was a Dutch record producer and songwriter. Mouth and MacNeal and Luv' are among the pop acts he produced. He won an ASCAP award for the song "How Do You Do" by Mouth and MacNeal. and composed three songs for the Eurovision Song Contest.

== Career ==
=== Debut ===
Van Hemert started his career in 1965 when he worked at Phonogram Records and his relationship with this record company lasted until 1979.

He produced and co-wrote songs for Q65, The Motions, Ro-d-ys, Zen, Group 1850, Big Wheel, Somerset, Ramses Shaffy and Liesbeth List, Sandra & Andres, Kamahl, American Gypsy, and Vulcano.

=== Mouth and MacNeal ===
Among the bands Van Hemert worked with: Mouth and MacNeal. This duo scored big hits not only in their homeland but also abroad between 1971 and 1974:

- "Hey You Love" (a Dutch Top 5 single in 1971).
- "How Do You Do" (this single was a Dutch #1 hit in 1971 but also a German Top 5 hit, #2 in Canada, and US Top 10 Hit in 1972 when it peaked at #8 on the Billboard Hot 100 chart.) This song sold two million copies worldwide.
- "Hello-a" (a #1 hit in the Netherlands and Germany in 1972).
- "Ik Zie Een Ster" / "I See A Star" (a Dutch and English Top 10 hit, this song was chosen to represent the Netherlands at the Eurovision Song Contest in 1974 (the year ABBA won it) where it finished in third place.

=== Luv' ===
Luv' (1977–2020) was a female pop trio he formed with the help from Piet Souer and a manager, Han Meijer (later replaced by Pim Ter Linde). This girl group had popular hit records in large part of Continental Europe, South Africa, New Zealand, Australia and Mexico in the late 1970s and early 1980s. Among their hit singles were: "U.O.Me", "You're the Greatest Lover", "Trojan Horse", "Casanova" and "Ooh, Yes I Do". This formation sold seven million records.

=== Eurovision Song Contest ===
In addition to Mouth and MacNeal, he wrote two other Eurovision songs: "Als het om de liefde gaat" by Sandra & Andres (#4 in 1972) and "The Party's Over" by Sandra Reemer (#9 in 1976).

=== Later career ===
Van Hemert composed and produced "Wij houden van Oranje", a football song performed by André Hazes to support the Netherlands national soccer team at the UEFA Euro 1988. The same year, he wrote a track recorded by Yann Andersen for a UNICEF campaign. In the late 1990s, he created an independent music production company (Hans van Hemert Productions) that still licenses his hits to labels for 1970s nostalgia compilations.

In addition to Luv', he produced other girl groups:

- in 1981: Babe (this pop act was formed by Peter Koelewijn).
- in 1994–1995: Lily Marlene (also created by)
- in 1997: Patty Cash (whose members were chosen by Patty Brard)
- in 2005–2006: Bling Inc. (also created by)

In April 2005, the Luv' ladies made a surprise showcase at his 40-year business anniversary and 60th birthday. In the spring of 2006, his production team remixed "Trojan Horse" (which was included in the box set Completely In Luv' (released by Universal Music Netherlands). Two years later, he produced and wrote a digital single for Mother's and Father's day, "De allerliefste mama en papa" performed by his daughter Hannah and his granddaughter Britt.

In later years, some of his compositions were utilised by contemporary artists from the dance and techno scene.

- "How Do You Do" was sampled by Party Animals in 2006 and by Scooter one year later for his European hit "The Question Is What Is the Question?" (a Top 5 hit in Germany, Austria, Finland, Hungary, reaching the Top 20 in Ireland and the Top 50 in the Netherlands and UK).
- "You're the Greatest Lover" was covered by:
  - Loona with a version in Spanish ("Latino Lover") that was a Top 10 hit single in German speaking countries in 2000.
  - Massiv in Mensch with an industrial version in 2004.
  - Swoop, whose dance rendition peaked at #25 on the Flemish Ultratop chart.
- "Trojan Horse" was sampled by Sheffield Jumpers for their jumpstyle single, "Jump With Me" (a minor hit on the German Media Control Charts) in 2008.

Van Hemert was diagnosed with prostate cancer in 2010. In July 2023 he announced it had metastatized through his entire body. He died on 7 October 2024, at the age of 79.

The eight #1 hits on the Dutch Top 40

Eight of his productions/compositions were #1 hits in the Netherlands (some of them world hits too):

- "Hair" by Zen (1968)
- "Mijn Gebed" by DC Lewis (1970)
- "How Do You Do" and "Hello-a" by Mouth and MacNeal (1972)
- "The Elephant Song" by Kamahl (1975)
- "You're the Greatest Lover" and "Trojan Horse" by Luv' (1978)
- "Shine Up" by Doris D & The Pins (1980)

== Awards ==
Among the awards he received were:

- two Conamus Export Prizes (for his collaboration with the best Dutch export music acts): in 1972 (with Mouth and MacNeal) and in 1979 (with Luv').
- a Gouden Harp (Golden Harp) in 1974 for his talents as a producer.
- an ASCAP award in the United States for the song "How Do You Do" by Mouth and MacNeal.
- Forty gold and platinum records.

== Bibliography ==
- "500 Nr.1 Hits uit de Top 40", book by Johan van Slooten, Gottmer Becht Publishing, 1997
- "Top 40 Hitdossier 1956–2005 (9e editie)", book by Johan van Slooten, Gottmer Bech Publishing, 2006
- "50 jaar nummer-1-hits 1956–2006", book by Johan van Slooten, Gottmer Uitgevers Groep, 2006
- "Albumdossier 1969–2002", book by Johan van Slooten, Becht's Uitgevers, 2002
