= Piet Souer =

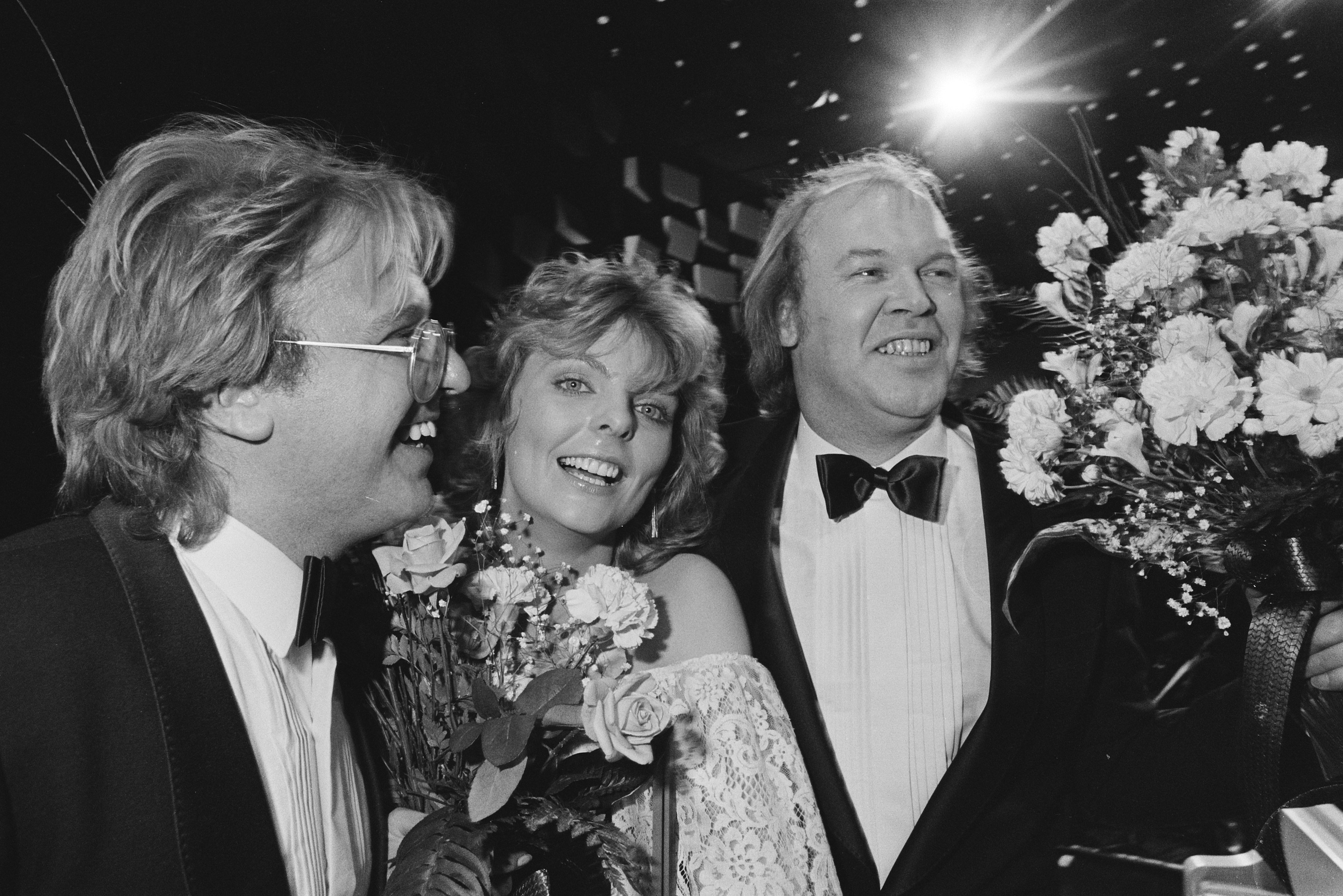
- Martin Duiser, Bernadette and Piet Souer (1983)

Background information
- Born: 29 March 1948 (age 76); Eindhoven, Netherlands
- Origin: Netherlands
- Genres: Pop; classical music
- Occupations: Songwriter; producer; arranger
- Years active: 1969–present

Pieter Cornelis "Piet" Souer (born 29 March 1948) is a Dutch record producer, songwriter and arranger. Through his collaborations with acts such as Luv', Mouth & MacNeal, Liesbeth List, Ramses Shaffy, American Gypsy, and Champagne, he has achieved twenty-two gold and platinum records, a Conamus Export Prize, and an 'Outstanding Song Award' for his composition "Too Young To Know", performed by Anita Meyer at World Popular Song Festival in Japan in 1981.

== Debut ==
Piet Souer (a guitar and keyboard player) started his career as a member of The Valiants, a rock band from Eindhoven. His breakthrough happened when he played guitar on "De troubadour", a track performed by Lenny Kuhr, winner of the Eurovision Song Contest 1969. The next year, Kuhr, bassist Paul Reekers and Souer were the supporting act of Georges Brassens during his tour in France.

== Producer, arranger, songwriter and conductor ==
In the early 1970s, he scored, as a songwriter and an arranger, moderate hits such as "I'm The Grand Pretender" and "Keep On Dancing" (performed by Cardinal Point) and "Angel Eyes" (performed by American Gypsy) as well as successful chart toppers in the Netherlands including "Te Veel Te Vaak" (by Liesbeth List) and "Samen" (by Liesbeth List & Ramses Shaffy).

In 1976, he recorded with the conductor Harry van Hoof the album Strings by Candlelight (certified gold in the Netherlands). Then, he produced hit records for popular Dutch acts such as Champagne (1977 Export Award), Doris D. & The Pins, Vanessa, American Gypsy, Mouth & MacNeal, Anita Meyer, Maywood, Conquistador. He also collaborated with international artists including Vicky Leandros, Helen Shapiro, Katie Kissoon and Engelbert Humperdinck.

In 1982, Sylvie Vartan sang one of his composition ("La Sortie de Secours"), which was released as a single and was a French cover version of "I'm So Sorry" (originally performed by José Hoebee). The same year, British pop group Tight Fit covered "Fantasy Island" (one of his songs originally performed by The Millionaires) which became a UK Top 5 hit and a European Top 10 hit.

== Luv' ==
In 1976, he teamed up with producer Hans van Hemert and manager Han Meijer (later replaced by Pim Ter Linde) to form a female pop trio: Luv'. Van Hemert and him wrote songs for the girl group (under the pseudonym Janschen & Janschens). In the late 1970s, Luv' had popular hit singles (such as "You're The Greatest Lover", "Trojan Horse" or "Casanova") in Benelux, German-speaking countries, Denmark, Spain, France, South Africa, New Zealand and Mexico. This international success made Luv' win a Conamus Export Prize in 1979. This formation sold seven million records (singles and albums).

== Eurovision Song Contest ==
Souer composed two songs for the Eurovision Song Contest: "Sing Me a Song" by Bernadette (in 1983) and "De eerste keer" by Maxine & Franklin Brown (in 1996). Both of them reached seventh position in the Contest.

== TV jingles and film soundtracks ==
Souer has composed many film soundtracks and television jingles.

Scores for TV programs including:

- Suske en Wiske
- Ted Show
- Spoorloos
- Dutch version of the game show Boggle
- Dutch, American, Swedish and Polish versions of Lingo

He composed Bel canto themes for the NCRV show Una Voce Particolare hosted by Ernst Daniel Smid. His collaboration with Smid includes the Top 5 album Gevoel van Geluk.

Film soundtracks including:

- 2005 movie about Vincent van Gogh
- Black Book, directed by Paul Verhoeven
- Rembrandt van Rijn (Dutch Masters) (for the year of Rembrandt in 2006)

== Bibliography ==
- 500 Nr.1 Hits uit de Top 40, by Johan van Slooten, Gottmer Becht Publishing, 1997
- Top 40 Hitdossier 1956–2005 (9e editie), by Johan van Slooten, Gottmer Bech Publishing, 2006
- 50 jaar nummer-1-hits 1956–2006, by Johan van Slooten, Gottmer Uitgevers Groep, 2006
- Albumdossier 1969–2002, by Johan van Slooten, Becht's Uitgevers, 2002
