= Candy Dulfer discography =

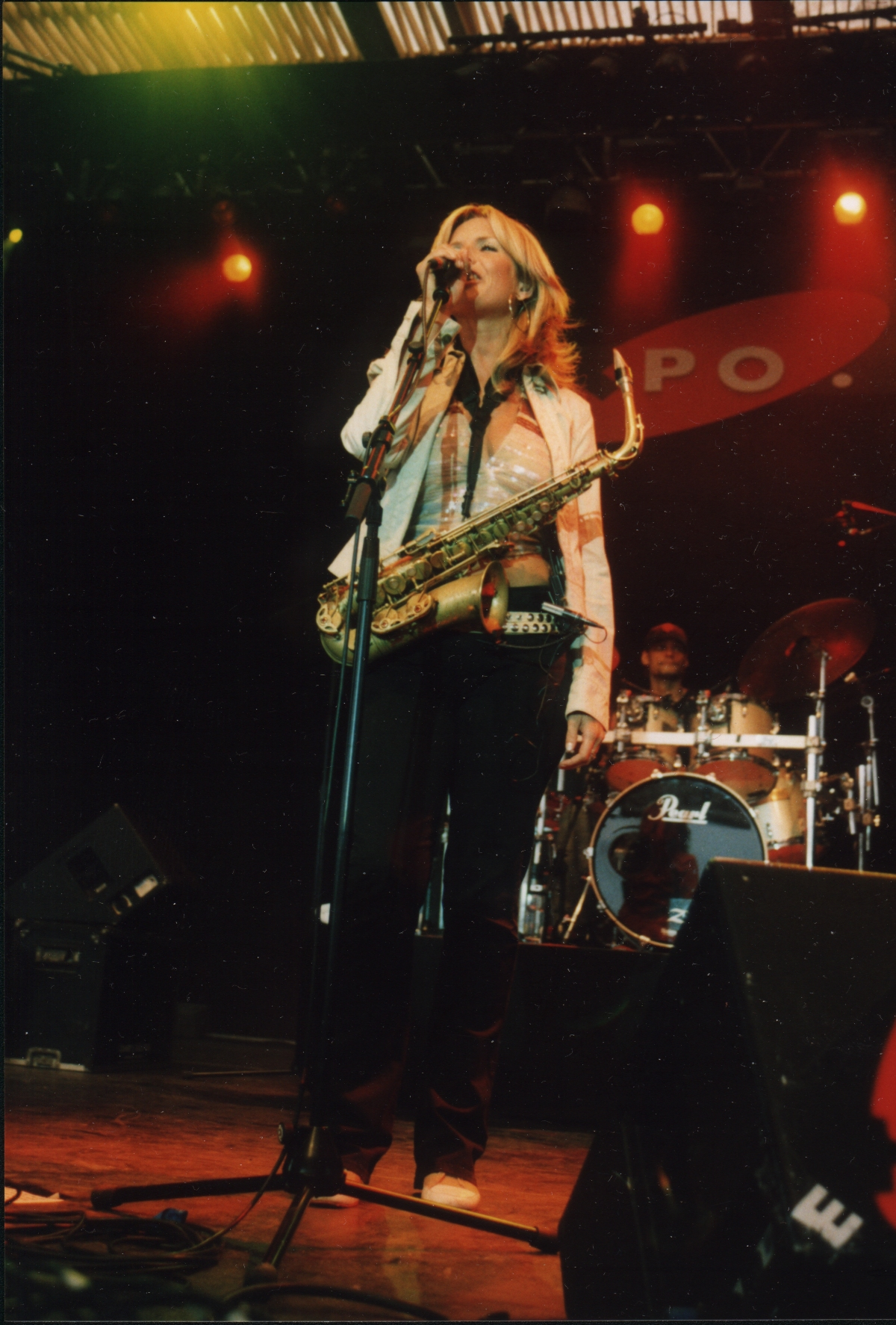
- Candy Dulfer in 2006
- Studio albums: 12
- Live albums: 2
- Compilation albums: 1
- Singles: 12

This discography of Candy Dulfer contains her own singles and albums, and also the other artists' albums for which she recorded.

== Albums ==
=== Studio albums ===
Title	Album details	Peak chart positions									
Title	Album details	NLD	AUS	SWI	JPN	US Jazz	US Cont. Jazz	AUT	UK	GER	SWE
Saxuality	Released: June 1990; Label: Arista, Ariola; Formats: LP, Cassette, CD, digital download	3	133	30	—	—	4	—	27	39	33
Sax-a-Go-Go	Released: 1993; Label: Ariola Records; Formats: LP, Cassette, CD, digital download	6	79	11	—	6	5	22	56	—	—
Big Girl	Released: 1995; Label: Ariola Records; Formats: CD, digital download	21	—	32	32	—	—	—	—	—	—
For the Love of You	Released: October 21, 1997; Label: Ariola Records; Formats: CD, digital download	18	—	23	56	5	2	—	—	—	—
What Does It Take	Released: August 10, 1999; Label: N2K Records; Formats: CD, digital download	—	—	—	79	20	14	—	—	—	—
Girls Night Out	Released: September 20, 1999; Label: BMG; Formats: CD, digital download	94	—	33	—	—	—	—	—	—	—
Right in My Soul	Released: May 20, 2003; Label: Eagle Records; Formats: CD, digital download	53	—	—	110	43	—	—	—	—	—
Candy Store	Released: September 18, 2007; Label: Heads Up Records; Formats: CD, digital download	32	—	96	105	11	2	—	—	—	—
Funked Up!	Released: May 12, 2009; Label: Heads Up Records; Formats: CD, digital download	20	—	—	87	11	6	—	—	—	—
Crazy	Released: November 8, 2011; Label: In-Akustik; Formats: CD, digital download	30	—	—	258	6	2	—	—	—	—
Together	Released: April 14, 2017; Label: In-Akustik; Formats: CD, digital download	44	—	—	—	—	—	—	—	—	—
We Never Stop	Released: October 28, 2022; Label: The Funk Garage; Formats: CD, digital download	20	—	—	—	—	—	—	—	—	—
"—" denotes a recording that did not chart or was not released in that territory.

Note: Saxuality peaked at position 22 in the US on the Billboard 200, Top Album Sales, and Top Current Album Sales music charts in 1991.

=== Live albums ===
Title	Album details	Peak chart positions
Title	Album details	NLD
Live in Amsterdam	Released: June 5, 2001; Label: BMG; Formats: CD, digital download	27
Live at Montreux 2002	Released: September 20, 2005; Label: Eagle Records; Formats: CD, digital download	—
"—" denotes a recording that did not chart or was not released in that territory.

=== Compilation albums ===
Title	Album details	Peak chart positions			
Title	Album details	NLD	JPN	US Jazz	US Cont. Jazz
The Best of Candy Dulfer	Released: September 22, 1998; Label: Encoded Music; Formats: CD, digital download	—	37	14	10
"—" denotes a recording that did not chart or was not released in that territory.

=== Collaborative albums ===
Title	Album details
Dulfer Dulfer (with Hans Dulfer)	Released: November 19, 2002; Label: Eagle Records; Formats: CD

== Singles ==
Year	Title	Peak positions						Album
Year	Title	NLD	AUS	BEL (FLA)	SWI	UK	US Smooth Jazz Airplay	Album
1989	"Lily Was Here" (with David A. Stewart)	1	10	2	10	6	—N/a	Lily Was Here / Saxuality
1990	"Saxuality"	3	—	24	—	60	—N/a	Saxuality
1990	"Heavenly City"	50	168	—	—	—	—N/a	Saxuality
1993	"Sax-a-Go-Go"	12	107	32	33	—	—N/a	Sax-a-Go-Go
1993	"Pick Up the Pieces"	46	146	—	—	—	—N/a	Sax-a-Go-Go
1993	"I Can't Make You Love Me"	—	—	—	—	—	—N/a	Sax-a-Go-Go
1993	"2 Funky" (US only)	—	—	—	—	—	—N/a	Sax-a-Go-Go
1995	"Wake Me When It's Over"	—	—	—	—	—	—N/a	Big Girl
1996	"I'll Still Be Looking Up to You"	—	—	—	—	—	—N/a	Big Girl
1997	"For the Love of You"	63	—	—	—	—	—N/a	For the Love of You
1997	"Saxy Mood"	—	—	—	—	—	—N/a	For the Love of You
1999	"Cookie"	—	—	—	—	—	—N/a	What Does It Take
1999	"What Does It Take (To Win Your Love for Me)"	—	—	—	—	—	—N/a	What Does It Take
2003	"What's in Your Head"	99	—	—	—	—	—N/a	Right in My Soul
2007	"L.A. City Lights"	—	—	—	—	—	1	Candy Store
2008	"Back to Juan"	—	—	—	—	—	22	Candy Store
2008	"Smokin' Gun"	—	—	—	—	—	28	Candy Store
2009	"On & On"	—	—	—	—	—	13	Funked Up!
2022	"Convergency" (with Nile Rodgers)	—	—	—	—	—	1	We Never Stop
"—" denotes a recording that did not chart or was not released in that territory.

Note: "Lily Was Here" peaked at position 11 in the US on the Billboard Hot 100 music chart in 1991.

== Guest appearances ==
- I Didn't Ask (1981) of Hans Dulfer & De Perikels
- Too Busy (1984) of Rosa King & Upside Down
- State of Mind (1985) of City-and-State
- Red Skies (1985) of Boom Boom Mancini
- Timboektoe (1986) of Think Big
- L'amour qui fait boum (1988) of Sjako!
- Graffiti Bridge (1990) of Prince
- Hot Piece of Merchandise (1989) of Urban Heroes
- Hooks (1989) of Herman Brood & His Wild Romance
- Pandemonium (1990) of The Time
- Midnight Man (1990) of René Froger
- What You See Is What You Sweat (1991) of Aretha Franklin
- Hymns to the Silence (1991) of Van Morrison
- Life on Planet Groove (1992) of Maceo Parker
- Sweet Hellos & Sad Goodbyes (1992) of René Froger
- Mr. Blue (1993) of René Klijn
- Too Long in Exile (1993) of Van Morrison
- Empowered (1993) of Boom Boom Mancini
- Live in Concert (1993) of René Froger
- A Night in San Francisco (1993) of Van Morrison
- Hips' First (1994) of Hips
- Big Boy (1994) of Hans Dulfer
- The Best of Rosa King (1995) of Rosa King & Upside Down
- Dig! (1996) of Hans Dulfer
- O'beat (1996) of D'wys
- Total Touch (1996) of Total Touch
- 'Tis the Season (1997) of various artists
- 50 (1997) of Herman Brood
- No Exit (1998) of Blondie
- Bodymusic (1998) of Saskia Laroo
- Skin Deep! (1998) of Hans Dulfer
- Oog in oog – Live in Ahoy (2001) of Bløf
- Some Love (2001) of Soulvation
- Verschil moet er zijn (2002) of Brainpower
- One Nite Alone... Live! (2002) of Prince
- Xpectation (2003) of Prince
- Maceo by Maceo (2003) of Maceo Parker
- Jack O' the Green (2003) of Jools Holland
- Musicology (2004) of Prince
- School's In! (2005) of Maceo Parker
- See You as I Do (2005) of Trijntje Oosterhuis
- 3121 (2006) of Prince
- Zangzaag (2007) of Kasper van Kooten
- Meer dan ooit (2007) of Edsilia Rombley
- ABC of Romance (2007) of Moon Baker
- Finally (2007) of Berget Lewis
- Live at Knebworth 1990 (2021) of Pink Floyd
- "Pick Up the Pieces" (Future Mix 92) featuring King MC (1993)
