= Crazy (disambiguation) =

Crazy refers to craziness, or insanity, a spectrum of behaviors characterized by certain abnormal mental or behavioral patterns.

Crazy may also refer to:

== Film ==
- The Crazies (1973 film), a film about a biological weapon's effects on a small town
- Crazy (1999 film), a documentary by Heddy Honigmann
- Crazy (2000 film), a film by Hans-Christian Schmid
- C.R.A.Z.Y., a 2005 film by Jean-Marc Vallée
- Crazy (2007 film), a film by Rick Bieber
- The Crazies (2010 film), a remake of the 1973 film

== Literature ==
- Crazy Magazine (1973–1983), a comic magazine
- Crazy (novel), a 2010 novel by William Peter Blatty
- Crazy, a novel by Benjamin Lebert

== Music ==
- Crazy (calypsonian) (born 1944), calypso singer from Trinidad and Tobago

=== Albums ===
- Crazy (Candy Dulfer album), 2011
- Crazy (Julio Iglesias album), 1994
- Crazy (Daniele Negroni album), 2012
- Crazy (4Minute EP), 2015
- Crazy (Le Sserafim EP), 2024

=== Songs ===
- "Crazy" (4Minute song), 2015
- "Crazy" (Aerosmith song), 1994
- "Crazy" (Anggun song), 2008
- "Crazy" (Franka Batelić song), 2018
- "Crazy" (The Boys song), 1990
- "Crazy" (Ricki-Lee Coulter song), 2012
- "Crazy" (Doechii song), 2022
- "Crazy" (Dream song), 2003
- "Crazy" (Eternal song), 1994
- "Crazy" (Expatriate song), 2007
- "Crazy" (From Ashes to New song), 2018
- "Crazy" (Gnarls Barkley song), 2006
- "Crazy" (Leah Haywood song), 2000
- "Crazy" (Miki Howard song), 1988
- "Crazy" (Icehouse song), 1987
- "Crazy" (Javier song), 2003
- "Crazy" (K-Ci and JoJo song), 2001
- "Crazy" (K.Maro song) (2004)
- "Crazy" (Le Sserafim song), 2024
- "Crazy" (Lil Baby song), 2023
- "Crazy" (Lost Frequencies and Zonderling song), 2017
- "Crazy" (Lumidee song), 2007
- "Crazy" (The Manhattans song), 1983
- "Crazy" (Willie Nelson song), a 1961 song most popularly performed by Patsy Cline
- "Crazy" (Neu! song), 2010
- "Crazy" (Kenny Rogers song), 1985
- "Crazy" (Seal song), a 1990 song covered by Alanis Morissette in 2005
- "Loca" (Shakira song) or "Crazy", 2010)
- "Crazy" (Simple Plan song), 2004
- "(You Drive Me) Crazy", a 1999 song by Britney Spears
- "Crazy", a 1985 song by the Adicts from Smart Alex
- "Crazy", a 1992 song by Barenaked Ladies from Gordon
- "Crazy", a 2005 song by Andy Bell from Electric Blue
- "Crazy", a 2014 song by Christopher from Told You So
- "Crazy", a 2004 song by Ciara from Goodies
- "Crazy", a 2014 song by Kat Dahlia from My Garden
- "Crazy", a 2011 song by Daughtry from Break the Spell
- "Crazy", a 1997 song by Alana Davis from Blame It on Me
- "Crazy", a 2019 song by Dune Rats from Hurry Up and Wait
- "Crazy", a 2004 song by Estelle from The 18th Day
- "Crazy", a 2026 song by Exo from Reverxe
- "Crazy", a 2006 song by Kevin Federline from Playing with Fire
- "Crazy", a 1985 song by Five Star from Luxury of Life
- "Crazy", a 2020 song by Got7 from Dye
- "Crazy", a 1977 song by Dan Hill from Longer Fuse
- "Crazy", a 2010 song by James from The Night Before
- "Crazy", a 2017 song by Lil Pump from Lil Pump
- "Crazy", a 2019 song by Madonna from Madame X
- "Crazy", a 1980 song by Men at Work, released as a B-side to "Down Under"
- "Crazy", a 2015 song by Shawn Mendes from Handwritten
- "Crazy", a 1997 song by Yvette Michele from My Dream
- "Crazy", a 1995 song by Mark Morrison from Return of the Mack
- "Crazy (A Suitable Case for Treatment)", a 1981 song by Nazareth from the soundtrack to the film Heavy Metal
- "Crazy", a 2007 song by Ne-Yo from Because of You
- ”Crazy”, a 2020 song by Bazzi
- "Crazy", a 2016 song by the Newsboys from Love Riot
- "Crazy", a 1983 song by Pylon from Chomp
- "Crazy", a 1993 song by Joe Satriani from Time Machine
- "Crazy", a 2016 song by Scooter from Ace
- "Crazy", a 1980 song by Tom Scott from Stir Crazy (film)
- "Crazy", a 2006 song by Snoop Dogg from Tha Blue Carpet Treatment
- "Crazy", a 2011 song by Alexandra Stan from Saxobeats
- "Crazy", a 1982 song by Supertramp from ...Famous Last Words...
- "Crazy", a 2026 song by Oliver Tree from Love You Madly Hate You Badly
- "Crazy", a 1994 song by Usher from Usher

== Places ==
- Crazy Creek, a stream in Utah
- Crazy Lake, a lake in California

== Television episodes ==
- "Crazies" (Casualty), 1986
- "Crazy" (Country Comfort), 2021
- "Crazy" (Nashville), 2014
- "Crazy" (Wynonna Earp), 2021

== People ==
- Phillip Boudreault (1975–2026), Canadian boxer and outlaw biker nicknamed "Crazy"

== See also ==
- Crazy Crazy (disambiguation)
- Craze (disambiguation)
- Krazy (disambiguation)
- The Crazies (disambiguation)
