= Craze =

Craze may refer to:

- Craze, alternative name for fad
- Craziness, alternative name for insanity
- Crazing, a network of fine cracks

== People ==
- Aaron Craze, English celebrity chef
- DJ Craze (born 1977), Nicaraguan American DJ
- Elizabeth Craze (born 1982), youngest ever heart transplant survivor at time of surgery (1984)
- Galaxy Craze (born 1970), American actress
- Michael Craze (1942–1998), British actor, brother of Peter Craze
- Nathan Craze (born 1986), Welsh professional ice hockey player
- Peter Craze (1946–2020), British actor, brother of Michael Craze
- Richard Craze (1950–2006), British author
- Romilly Craze (1892–1974), English architect
- Sarah Craze (born 1948), British actress

== Events ==
- Tulip craze in the 17th century in the Dutch Republic
- Gin Craze in the first half of the 18th century in Britain
- Pansy Craze in the late-1920s to mid-1930s in the United States
- 1947 flying disc craze in the United States

== See also ==
- Dance crazes, alternative name for fad dances
- Craze, 1974 horror film starring Jack Palance and Diana Dors
- Drowning Craze, 1980s English post-punk band
- Maze Craze, 1980 video game
- Dance Craze, 1981 British documentary film
- Maize Craze, 1992 FIRST Robotics Competition game
- Cache Craze, 2010s Canadian television show
- Crazy (disambiguation)
