= Live in Amsterdam (Candy Dulfer album) =

Live album by Candy Dulfer
- Released: February 2001
- Recorded: Paradiso, Amsterdam, Netherlands
- Genre: Jazz
- Length: 1:03:59
- Label: Ariola Records
- Producer: Candy Dulfer, Thomas Bank and Ulco Bed

Candy Dulfer chronology
Girls' Night Out (1999)	Live in Amsterdam (2001)	Dulfer Dulfer (2002)

Live in Amsterdam is the first live album by Candy Dulfer and contains prior hits such as "Sax-a-go-go," "Lily Was Here" and "Dance 'till You Bop," and new songs such as "Synchrodestiny."

The album features David A. Stewart, Hans Dulfer and Angie Stone as special guests. The album peaked at #27 in the Dutch album charts.

== Track listing ==
#	Title	Length
1.	"Bob's Jazz"	4:57
2.	"Omara's Dance"	5:46
3.	"For The Love Of You" featuring Angie Stone	8:31
4.	"Sax-a-Go-Go"	10:53
5.	"Lily Was Here" featuring David A. Stewart	5:23
6.	"Synchrodestiny" featuring David A. Stewart	5:09
7.	"Nikki's Dream"	8:41
8.	"Pick Up The Pieces"	9:32
9.	"Dance 'till You Bop Revisited" featuring Hans Dulfer	5:08
1. Contains elements from "Sexuality" by Ulco Bed / Candy Dulfer, elements from "Funky Stuff" by Kool and The Gang and elements from "The Serpent's Tooth" by Miles Davis.; 2. Contains elements from "P Funk" by George Clinton and elements from "Defunkt" by Joseph Bowie.

== Personnel ==
Candy Dulfer	Alto sax and vocals
Ulco Bed	Guitar
Thomas Bank	Hammond organ and keyboards
Roger Happel	Vocals, rhodes and keyboards
Pieter Lieberom	Tenor sax and vocals
Jan van Duikeren	Trumpet and vocals
Oscar Kraal	Drums and vocals
Manuel Hugas	Bass guitar
David A. Stewart (special guest)	Guitar and electric sitar
Angie Stone (special guest)	Lead vocals
Hans Dulfer (special guest)	Tenor sax
Dick van Dolron	Assistant producer
Ronald Trijber	NOB Mobile audio recording
Frans Hendriks	NOB Mobile audio recording, mixing and mastering
