= Dulfer =

Dulfer is a surname. Notable people with the surname include:

- Candy Dulfer (born 1969), Dutch jazz musician
- Eric Dulfer (born 1961), Dutch cricketer
- Hans Dulfer (born 1940), Dutch jazz musician
- Kelly Dulfer (born 1994), Dutch handball player
