= Lily Was Here (film) =

Lily Was Here De Kassière
- Directed by: Ben Verbong
- Written by: Ben Verbong, Sytze van der Laan, Willem Jan Otten
- Produced by: Chris Brouwer, Haig Balian
- Cinematography: Lex Wertwijn
- Edited by: Ton de Graaff
- Music by: David A. Stewart
- Production company: Movies Film Productions
- Distributed by: Meteor Film; SVS/Triumph (US)
- Release date: 10 June 1989
- Running time: 112 minutes
- Country: Netherlands
- Language: Dutch

Lily Was Here (original title in Dutch: De Kassière, The Cashier) is a 1989 Dutch drama film directed by Ben Verbong. One song from the film's soundtrack, performed by Candy Dulfer and Dave Stewart, was later released as a single – "Lily Was Here".

== Plot ==
Teenager Lily works as a checkout girl at the local supermarket.

She becomes pregnant, but before the child is born, the father of her unborn child is attacked by a gang and killed.

Following his death, she flees to the city, where she soon finds herself under the wings of a pimp, Ted.

Escaping Ted, she commences a one-woman spree of thefts, culminating in running from the police and the press.

In the end, Lily is forced to choose between freedom and her baby.

== Cast ==
- Marion van Thijn ...Lily
- Thom Hoffman ... Arend
- Coen van Vrijberghe de Coningh ... Ted
- Truus te Selle ... Lily's Mother
- Con Meyer ...Sjaak
- Monique van de Ven ...Midwife Conny
- Hans Kesting ... Piccolo
- Kees Hulst ... Emile
- Jaloe Maat ... Helen

== Background ==
- The film was largely shot in Rotterdam.
- Marion van Thijn is the daughter of former mayor Ed van Thijn of Amsterdam.
- The music for the film was composed by David A. Stewart, former member of the band Eurythmics. A soundtrack album of the same name was also released.
- The title song, "Lily Was Here," reached first place in the Dutch charts and was a hit internationally. Candy Dulfer played the major saxophone pieces on the track.
