= Live in Amsterdam =

Live in Amsterdam may refer to:

- Live in Amsterdam (Toto album), 2003
- Live in Amsterdam (Fishbone album), 2005
- Live in Amsterdam (Candy Dulfer album)
- Live in Amsterdam (Beth Hart and Joe Bonamassa album), 2014
