= Candy Store =

Candy Store may refer to:

- Confectionery store, a store that sells candy
- Candy Store (album), a 2007 jazz album by Candy Dulfer
- Candy Store (film), an upcoming film to be directed by Stephen Gaghan
- "Candy Store", a song from Heathers: The Musical
- Candy Store, compilation album by Norwegian band Minor Majority
- "Candy Store", a song by Faber Drive

== See also ==
- Candy Shop (disambiguation)
