= Lily Was Here (soundtrack) =

Soundtrack album by David A. Stewart
- Released: 1989
- Label: Anxious; RCA
- Producer: David A.Stewart

David A. Stewart chronology
Lily Was Here (1989)	Dave Stewart and the Spiritual Cowboys (1990)

Lily Was Here is the soundtrack album to the 1989 Dutch drama film of the same name (original title in Dutch: De Kassière, The Cashier), directed by Ben Verbong. The soundtrack was produced and largely written by David A. Stewart, one half of the British pop duo Eurythmics.

The title track from the soundtrack, an instrumental duet between Stewart playing guitar and Candy Dulfer on saxophone, who also features on and co-wrote three of the other tracks, was released as a single and charted in numerous countries including reaching number one in the Netherlands for four weeks, number 6 in the UK Singles Chart and number 11 on the US Billboard Hot 100.

The soundtrack also includes a new version of the Eurythmics' 1984 single "Here Comes the Rain Again", featuring Annie Lennox on vocals.

== Critical reception ==
Professional ratings
Review scores
Source	Rating
AllMusic	3/5 stars
Record Mirror	4/5 stars

Pan-European magazine Music & Media left a warm review and highlighted the title track and the new version of "Here Comes the Rain Again". In a review for AllMusic, Sara Sytsma gave Lily Was Here three out of five stars, describing the soundtrack as "an atmospheric, subdued effort, highlighted by a revamped "Here Comes the Rain Again"[...]".

== Track listing ==
No.	Title	Writer(s)	Length
1.	"Lily Was Here"	David A. Stewart	4:19
2.	"The Pink Building"	Stewart; Pat Seymour; Olle Romo; Candy Dulfer; Chucho Merchán	2:52
3.	"Lily Robs the Bank"	Stewart; Seymour; Romo; Dulfer; Merchán	2:33
4.	"Toyshop Robbery"	Stewart; Seymour; Romo; Dulfer; Merchán	4:01
5.	"Toys On the Sidewalk"	Stewart; Seymour; Romo; Merchán	1:06
6.	"The Good Hotel"	Stewart; Seymour	2:04
7.	"Second Chance"	Stewart; Virginia Astley	4:14
8.	"Here Comes the Rain Again"	Stewart; Annie Lennox	6:00
9.	"Alone in the City"	Stewart; Seymour	1:23
10.	"Toyshop (Part One)"	Stewart; Seymour	1:09
11.	"The Coffin"	Stewart; Seymour	4:27
12.	"Teletype"	Stewart	1:39
13.	"Inside the Pink Building"	Stewart; Seymour	3:53
14.	"Percussion Jam"	Stewart; Romo	1:10
15.	"Peaches"	Stewart; Seymour	3:21
16.	"Lily Was Here (Reprise)"	Stewart	1:43

== Personnel ==
Adapted from the album's liner notes.

Musicians

- David A. Stewart – guitars
- Candy Dulfer – saxophone (tracks 1–4 & 16)
- Virginia Astley – vocals (track 7), keyboards (tracks 1 & 7)
- Annie Lennox – vocals (track 8)
- Chucho Merchán – bass guitar
- Olle Romo – drums
- Pat Seymour – keyboards

Production

- Produced by David A. Stewart
- Strings arranged by Pat Seymour; additional arrangement by Ed Shearmur
- Recording and mixing engineers: Steve McLaughlin, Gary Bradshaw; production assistant: Tony Quinn

== Charts ==
Chart (1989–90)	Peak position
Australian Albums (ARIA)	29
Austrian Albums (Ö3 Austria)	28
Dutch Albums (Album Top 100)	20
German Albums (Offizielle Top 100)	37
Swedish Albums (Sverigetopplistan)	28
UK Albums (OCC)	35
