= Candy Shop (disambiguation) =

"Candy Shop" is a 2005 song by 50 Cent featuring Olivia.

Candy Shop may also refer to:

- Candy shop or confectionery store, a store that sells candy
- Candy Shop (group), a South Korean girl group
- "Candy Shop", a song by Madonna on Hard Candy, 2008
- "Candy Shop", a song by Andrew Bird's Bowl of Fire from their 1999 album Oh! The Grandeur

== See also ==
- Candy Store (disambiguation)
