= Zombie Broadway =

2008 graphic novel

- Zombie Broadway graphic novel cover, art by Devaki Neogi
- Author: David A. Stewart, David Harris, Christine Schenley
- Illustrator: Daveki Neogi
- Language: English
- Genre: Graphic novel, Horror
- Publisher: Virgin Comics
- Publication date: March 2008
- Publication place: United States
- Media type: Print (Hardcover and Paperback)

Zombie Broadway, or Dave Stewart's Zombie Broadway, is a graphic novel created by David A. Stewart, David Harris, Christine Schenley, and illustrated by Daveki Neogi. Zombie Broadway is published by Virgin Comics.

It tells the story of a zombie outbreak in New York City that can only be quelled by the song and dance of the Broadway stage. Stewart plans to turn the concept into a musical.

== Plot ==
In Zombie Broadway, the human population of Manhattan has been decimated to the point where the only survivors are a few unlucky civilians and a bunch of stuck-up Broadway effetes. The acting mayor (the others have been eaten or killed) of New York has convinced the President to try taming the zombies through theater before the ultimate resolution of dropping a nuclear bomb on the city. The story of Zombie Broadway takes the form of an ensemble black comedy, full of violence and humor.

== Publication ==
Zombie Broadway was published in March 2008 by Virgin Comics. Recently, Virgin and Stewart began a Zombie Broadway karaoke contest via YouTube where contestants send videos of themselves singing the title song from the planned Broadway adaptation.

== Film adaptation ==
In 2014, Stewart hired Jonas Åkerlund to direct the feature film adaptation and Cole Haddon will adapt the comic.
