= Big Girl (Candy Dulfer album) =

Studio album by Candy Dulfer
- Released: February 1996
- Studio: Bananas Studios, Cruise Control, Studio 150, The Powerstation, Zeezicht Studio
- Genre: Jazz, smooth jazz, easy listening
- Length: 68:40
- Label: RCA
- Producer: Thomas Bank, Ulco Bed, Candy Dulfer

Candy Dulfer chronology
Sax-a-Go-Go (1993)	Big Girl (1996)	For the Love of You (1997)

Professional ratings
Review scores
Source	Rating
Allmusic	3/5 stars

Big Girl is the third album by Dutch alto saxophonist Candy Dulfer. Before its release, she had been working mainly with Ulco Bed. But she was impressed by keyboard player Thomas Bank. This album marks the transition between the two producers and has a funkier style that tries to incorporate rap and hip hop into contemporary jazz. The album includes a collaboration with Trijntje Oosterhuis on "Funkyness" before Oosterhuis became widely known as a singer. The album is mainly instrumental.

According to her official biography, the title of the album was an inside joke, referring to her father Hans Dulfer's album Big Boy and indicating that she had grown up and was in charge of her career. The album peaked at No. 28 on the Dutch album chart.

== Track listing ==
1. "Wake Me When It's Over" (Marcus Miller, David Sanborn) – 4:14
2. "I.L.U." (Thomas Bank) – 4:40
3. "Tommy Gun" (Bank) – 3:17
4. "Jazz It's Me" (Bank) – 4:39
5. "2 Miles" (Ulco Bed) – 6:16
6. "Funkyness" (Bank) – 5:13
7. "Capone" (Bed) – 4:46
8. "Get Funky" (Bank) – 4:48
9. "Chains" (Bank, Candy Dulfer) – 5:05
10. "September" (Bank) – 5:59
11. "Upstairs" (Bed) – 5:10
12. "I'll Still Be Looking Up to You" (Paul Kisch, Bobby Womack) – 4:48
13. "Big Girl" (Bank, Candy Dulfer, Hans Dulfer) – 4:05
14. "Wake Me When It's Over (remix)" (Miller, Sanborn) – 5:39

== Sales and certifications ==
Certifications for Big Girl
Region	Certification	Certified units/sales
Japan (RIAJ)	Gold	100,000^{^}
^{^} Shipments figures based on certification alone.
