= The Crazies =

The Crazies may refer to:

- insanity, or the insane
- The Crazy Mountains range in Montana
- The Crazies (1973 film), a science fiction horror film about a biological weapon's effects on a small town
- The Crazies (2010 film), a remake of the 1973 film

== See also ==
- Crazy (disambiguation)
