= Elizabeth Craze =

Youngest recipient of a heart transplant

Elizabeth Craze is one of the youngest known recipients of a heart transplant. She received a new heart in 1984 at the age of 2 years, 10 months. The operation was performed at Stanford Hospital, Stanford, California by the team of Norman Shumway, one of the early pioneers of heart transplant surgery. Although considered almost conventional today, in the early 1980s heart transplants (in children especially) were extremely rare.

== Surgery ==
At the time of Craze's procedure, an ethics committee was formed at Stanford to review the advantages and disadvantages of possible surgery for her. It was not known at the time if a donated heart would "continue to grow along with her body." Her family pleaded for the surgery as she was gravely ill and weighed only 23 pounds. A decision to proceed was reached by the committee and the donor was a young girl from Utah who had been the victim of a car crash.

Craze had three siblings who died of heart failure in infancy, and she was diagnosed at only 4 months old. Her surviving sibling, older brother Andrew, had a heart transplant at the age of 16. His operation preceded hers by one year, and Andrew was instrumental in pleading her case before the ethics committee.

Craze was at the time of the operation the youngest patient to have received a heart transplant. She has had to rely on various medications throughout her life, some with severe side effects, including needing a kidney transplant surgery at the age of 15. Craze has been able to lead a normal life including activities such as playing junior high school volleyball, and attending Whittier College. She was an active member of the Ionian Society, a local sorority, and went on to graduate in 2004. In 2009, Craze worked in IT for Facebook in Palo Alto, California, and celebrated the 25th anniversary of her surgery with a trip to Yosemite National Park and a short cruise to Mexico.

In 1996, 90-minute-old Cheyenne Pyle became the youngest known heart transplant recipient, and Craze became the second youngest on record.

== Life after surgery ==
Craze was featured in the Spring/Summer 2012 Children's Cardiomyopathy Foundation newsletter.

In October 2014 Craze celebrated the 30th anniversary of her surgery by raising money and awareness for Donate Life California, and completing the Rock’n’Roll Half-Marathon in San Jose. As of 2014, Craze was the only heart transplant recipient in the United States to survive 30 years with the same donor heart she received as a toddler.
