= Krazy =

Krazy may refer to:

== Comics ==
- Krazy (comics), a British children's comic
- Krazy Kat, a comic strip character

== Companies and Brands ==
- Krazy Krazy, a Canadian store franchise

== Music ==
- Krazy Fest, an American music festival, 1998–2011
- Krazy (rapper), an American rapper
- "Krazy" (BlackGirl song), 1994
- "Krazy" (Pitbull song), 2008
- "Krazy" (Lil Wayne song), 2018

== See also ==
- Crazy (disambiguation)
