= Charlotte Sophie Bentinck (film) =

- Directed by: Ben Verbong
- Written by: Hella S. Haasse, Ben Verbong (writer)
- Release date: 1996
- Running time: 107 minutes
- Country: Netherlands
- Language: Dutch

Charlotte Sophie Bentinck is a 1996 Dutch historical drama film directed by Ben Verbong.

== Cast ==
- Nanette Kuijpers as Charlotte Sophie
- Dick van Duin as Willem Bentinck
- Hiske van der Linden as Lottgen
- Tom Jansen as Albrecht
- Ellen Vogel as Wilhelmine
- Edda Barends as Cordier
- Carol van Herwijnen as van Boetzelaer
- Gerard Thoolen as Stadhouder Willem IV
