= Crazy Crazy =

Crazy Crazy may refer to:

- "Crazy Crazy" (Gen Hoshino song), 2014
- "Crazy Crazy" (Yasutaka Nakata song), 2017
- "Crazy Crazy", a song by Nasty C from I Love It Here, 2023

== See also ==
- Crazy (disambiguation)
