= Rosa King =

American jazz musician

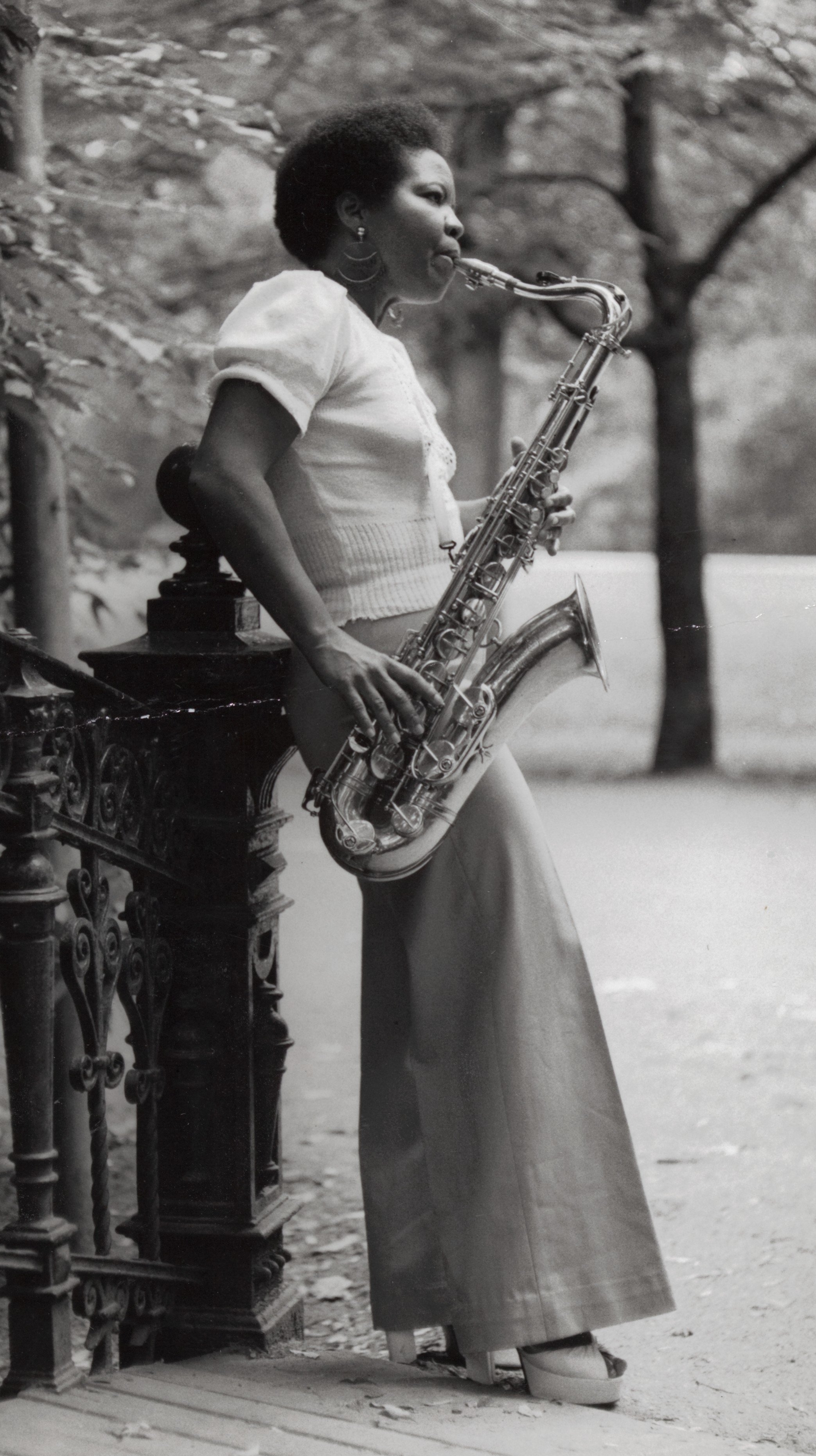

Rosa King (March 14, 1939 – December 12, 2000) was an American jazz and blues saxophonist and singer who made her fame in Amsterdam.

== Career ==
King was born in Macon, Georgia, United States. During her career, she worked with Ben E. King, Cab Calloway, Eric Burdon, and Sly Hampton. Her reputation was boosted by a tenor sax battle with Stan Getz at the North Sea Jazz Festival in 1978. She appeared on the TV show Sesame Street and in European television shows, as well as the cult film Comeback by Eric Burdon. Many careers were launched in her band, including those of Candy Dulfer, Saskia Laroo, and Alex Britti. She died from a heart attack in Italy shortly after a televised performance with Alex Britti in December 2000.

Although King was popular in Europe, she had little exposure in America except for brief periods when she lived in New York City, maintaining an apartment there for many years even while living in Amsterdam. The year before she died, she returned to Georgia to perform with a band under the name Rosa King and the Looters. Band members included J. Lyon Layden on guitar, Eric Layden on bass, Kristina Train on vocals and violin, Jeff Evans on drums, and Dan Walker on keyboards. During the same year, she performed at a jazz festival in South Africa and several dates in the Netherlands. Her last performance in Italy was a reunion with guitarist Alex Britti in a nationwide televised concert with nearly 100,000 people in attendance. Although she had suffered several heart attacks the week before, she performed in a wheelchair. Twelve hours later she died. A Rosa King Foundation was established in the Netherlands to help young female artists, and a memorial concert was conducted at the Melkweg concert house in Amsterdam.

== Discography ==
Album	Tracks	Tracks
Rosa King & Upside Down: 1974; Blue Elephant – PE 877072; Dureco*; Vinyl, LP; Netherlands	1 Up Side Down; 2 Don't Make Me Wait In Vain; 3 Feet Freak; 4 I Got To Feel Free; 5 Ghetto Of Peoples Minds; 6 Do You Wanna	7 Understanding; 8 Fame And Fortune; 9 Blues For You; 10 Chicken Legs; 11 Foot Steps; 12 Troubles
Vrouwenfestival 1979 - Live at the Melkweg: 1979 Vrouwenfestival (women's festival); with various female performers; Vinyl, LP; Milky Way Records; Netherlands; recorded live at the Melkweg, Amsterdam	1 So Far To Go 6:32	
So Far To Go: So Far To Go (LP, Album) Caribbean Circle F.C. 30505 Netherlands 1980; Summertime (LP, Album) Балкантон ВТА 2095 Bulgaria 1979	1 Change Is Gonna Come 3:15; 2 So Far To Go 6:35; 3 When Your Love Is Gone 6:15; 4 No Tears 3:15	5 Summer Time 4:00; 6 Do You Love Me Because 3:30; 7 Hello Lover 3:10; 8 All In The Name Of Love 5:00
Too Busy: 1980/1984; Pop Eye Label PE 105; Vinyl, LP, Mini-Album; Netherlands	1 Too Busy (Loving You) 3:40; 2 Can't Go Through Life 3:55; 3 I Never Knew 4:02	4 You've Changed Your Mind 5:43; 5 Sometimes 4:28
Rosa King's Favourite Blues Live: Live LP; 1981 Paradise + 1991 Riff; Rosa Kings Favourite Blues (LP, Album) Paradise SMC 100.005 1981; The Rosa Kings Favorite Ballads (LP, Album) Paradise SMC 100.005 1981; Rosa King's Favourite Blues (CD, Album, Liv) D&K CD 860037 1991; Netherlands	1 Gotta Be Free 4:30; 2 So Many Nights And Days 5:00; 3 St. James Infirmary 4:47; 4 Please Send Me Someone To Love 5:00	5 Gonna Find A New Love 4:20; 6 Georgia On My Mind 4:45; 7 Going Down Slow 12:15; 8 Trouble In My Mind 4:44
Under The Cover: 1987; Under The Cover (LP) D&K D&K 87011 Netherlands 1987; Under The Cover (LP) AVC AVL-2006 Spain 1989	1 Baby I Didn't Know 4:05; 2 Hello Lover 3:37; 3 The Every Best 6:19; 4 Who's Playing A Joke On Who 4:06	5 You're In Love 6:07; 6 It Wasn't Easy 4:49; 7 Test Of Time 5:15; 8 You Love Me To Much 5:26
Jazz out of Harlem: LP 1986; EMI		
"Who's Playing A Joke On Who?": Maxi single 1988 Metropole; 1987; Who's Playing A Joke On Who (12") Metropol Records MRP-109-MX Spain 1988; Who's Playing A Joke On Who (7") D&K 787011 Netherlands 1987; Who's Playing A Joke On Who (7", Promo) Metropol Records MRP- 109-S Spain 1988	1 Who's Playing A Joke On Who 4:06	2 You Love Me To Much 5:26
It Just Happened Live Cafe Alto: 1992; Riff – 85009-2; CD, Album; Netherlands	1 Why 7:54; 2 It Just Happened 7:05; 3 Gonna Find Me A New Love 10:04; 4 Own Decision 4:33; 5 Big Mistake 8:11	6 Don't Activate My Love Decease 8:47; 7 Taking Me A Chance 5:11; 8 Cold Cold Feeling 10:13; 9 Do You Feel Like Some Times 6:47; 10 Lonely Me 6:58
Salsa Carnaval Live		
Cheating on Me: * CD 1992 Bloomdido Productions/; live recording in Le Duc des Lombards, Parijs on 23/24 June 1992 with guest the American guitarist Luther Allison	1. Cheating On Me (2:58); 2. Trouble Free (3:00); 3. Don't Activate My Love Disease (6:07); 4. I Ain't Nobody's Fool (6:18); 5. I Got To Be Free (6:02)	6. Lay Down Beside You (7:15); 7. T/he Perfect Love (7:57); 8. Living And Loving (9:13); 9. So Far To Go (5:02); 10. Gonna Find Me A Love (9:08)
The Best of Rosa King & Upside Down: 1995 June Riff; CD	1 You've changed your mind 5:43; 2 Georgia on my mind 4:43; 3 I never knew 4:01; 4 Why 7:53; 5 Lonely me 3:00	6 Can't go through life 3:56; 7 The very best 6:20; 8 Too busy (Loving you) 3:42; 9 Cheating on me 6:55; 10 I ain't nobody's fool 6:18
25 Years Still Going Strong: Riff – 85054-2; CD; Netherlands; 1997; okt 1996 Recorded at Studio 88 Hilversum	1 Still Going Strong 3:29; 2 Catch 22 5:55; 3 When Love Is Gone 3:39; 4 Digging Them Potatoes 3:26; 5 Come In, Sit Down 4:50; 6 Bad Case Of The Blues 4:17	7 Have You Ever Loved A Woman 7:05; 8 It's Over 3:53; 9 No Time To Shop Around 3:17; 10 Bayerisher Hof 5:50; 11 I Keep Hurting 6:12
Rosa King & Up Side Down: "Do You Wanne": Frans Peters Studio – 6802 137; Vinyl, 7", 45 RPM, Single, Stereo; Netherlands; 1974; Maybe never official released. Misspelling in the title (Wanne) is on sleeve and record. Rosa King And Upside Down on this single without the crowd sound that appears on the LP that Frans Peters recorded in 1974.	1 Do You Wanne	2 Understanding
Rosa King & Up Side Down: "Baby, I Didn't Know": AVC, S.A. – AVC 206; Vinyl, 7", Single; Spain; 1989	1 Baby I Didn't Know 4:05	2 You Love Me To Much 5:26
Summertime: ВТА 2095; Vinyl, LP, Album; Bulgaria; 1979; So Far To Go (LP, Album) Caribbean Circle F.C. 30505 Netherlands 1980	1 Change Is Gonna Come; 2 So Far To Go; 3 When Love Is Gone; 4 No Tears	5 Summertime; 6 Do You Love Me; 7 Hello Lover; 8 All In The Name Of Love

== Trivia ==
King went to school with Richard Penniman (Little Richard).
