= Ben Verbong =

Dutch film director

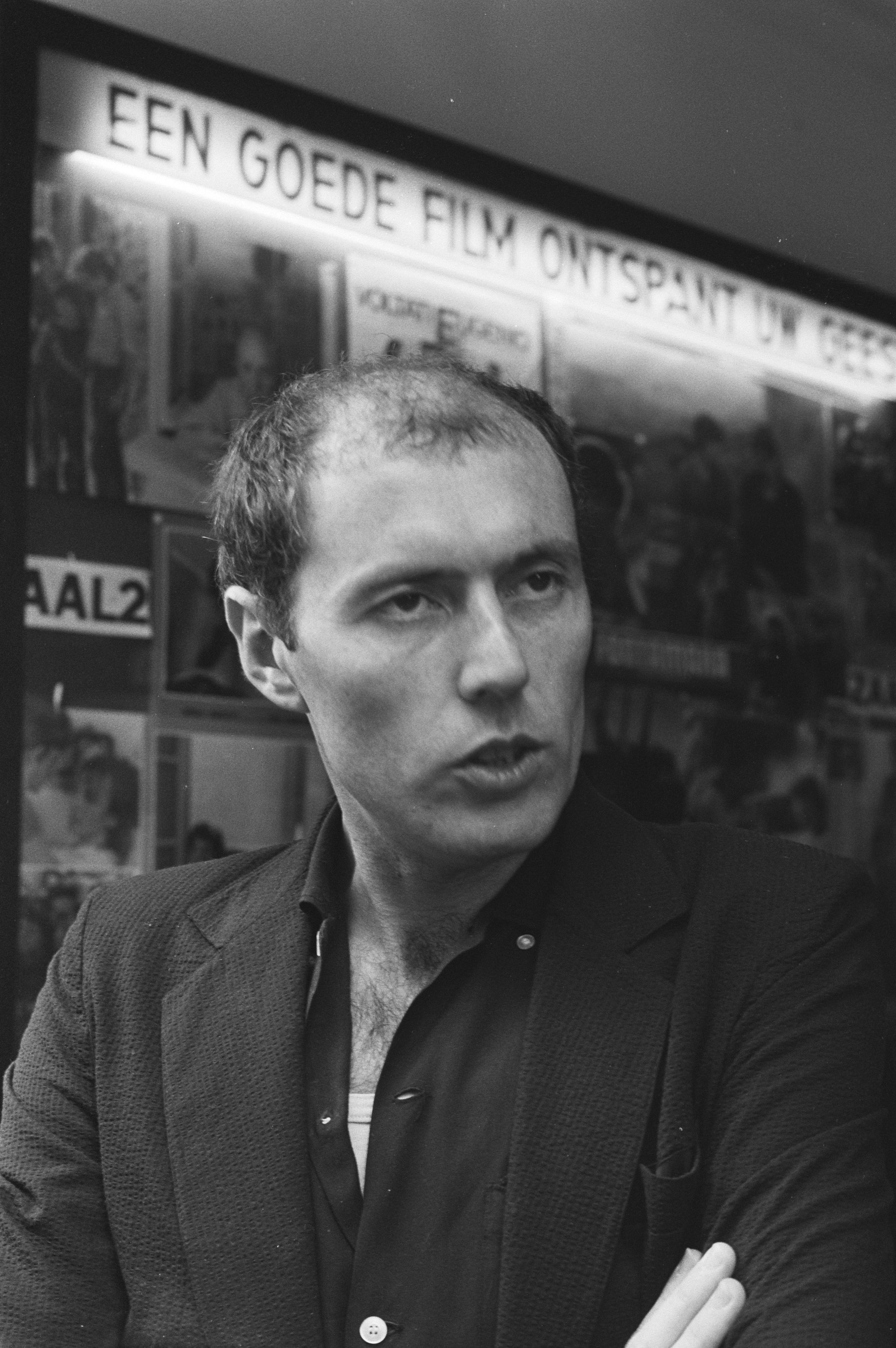
- Verbong in 1981
- Born: 2 July 1949 (age 76); Tegelen, Netherlands
- Occupations: Film director Screenwriter
- Years active: 1981–present

Ben Verbong (born 2 July 1949) is a Dutch film director and screenwriter. He has directed 18 films since 1981. His debut film The Girl with the Red Hair was entered into the 32nd Berlin International Film Festival.

== Selected filmography ==
- The Girl with the Red Hair (1981)
- De Kassière (1989)
- The Indecent Woman (1991)
- De Flat (1994)
- Charlotte Sophie Bentinck (1996)
- A Christmoose Carol (2005)
- The von Trapp Family: A Life of Music (2015)
- Toen ik je zag (2023)
