= Crazy Creek =

Stream in Beaver County, Utah, U.S.

Coordinates: 38.2955283°N 112.4385442°W

Crazy Creek is a stream in Beaver County, Utah, United States.

Some hold the stream was named for its irregular course, while others believe the odd behavior of a pioneer who settled on this creek caused its name to be selected.

== See also ==
- List of rivers of Utah
