= Children's Cardiomyopathy Foundation =

American non-profit medical organization

- Abbreviation: CCF
- Established: 2002
- Founder: Eddie Yu and Lisa Yue
- Founded at: New Jersey
- Type: Nonprofit organization
- Legal status: 501(c)(3)
- Purpose: Rare disease research
- Headquarters: Tenafly, New Jersey, U.S.
- Location: United States
- Website: childrenscardiomyopathy.org

The Children's Cardiomyopathy Foundation (CCF) is a national 501(c)(3) nonprofit organization focused on the pediatric forms of cardiomyopathy, a rare and chronic heart condition. Founded in New Jersey, CCF has grown into a global community of families, physicians, and scientists focused on accelerating the search for causes and cures for pediatric cardiomyopathy through increased research, education, awareness, and advocacy. The organization also provides support and resources to affected children and their families.

== History ==
CCF was founded in 2002 by Eddie Yu and Lisa Yue, who lost two children to cardiomyopathy. At the time, cardiomyopathy was a poorly understood disease in young children, and it had low public awareness. Due to the lack of research being conducted on pediatric cardiomyopathy, the Foundation established a research grant program and formed research partnerships with the American Heart Association, American Academy of Pediatrics, and National Heart, Lung, and Blood Institute-funded Pediatric Cardiomyopathy Registry. The Foundation also organizes international scientific conferences to encourage collaboration among researchers across medical centers.

CCF's investment into research and education has led to more than 420 medical presentations and peer-reviewed publications on pediatric cardiomyopathy and a four-fold increase in the number and dollar amount of pediatric cardiomyopathy studies funded by the National Institutes of Health.

In a 2017 paper published in the Journal of the American College of Cardiology, “Survival Without Cardiac Transplantation Among Children with Dilated Cardiomyopathy,” it was shown that there was a 50% reduction in diagnosed children dying and needing a heart transplant because of better care guidelines and collaborative research efforts made possible by CCF's support of the Pediatric Cardiomyopathy Registry.

Through CCF's advocacy work, the Cardiomyopathy Health Education Awareness Risk Assessment and Training in the Schools Act was the first bill on cardiomyopathy to be introduced in the United States House of Representatives and United States Senate. In 2020, it was reintroduced as a bipartisan bill in the House of Representatives.
