= Saxuality =

Studio album by Candy Dulfer
- Released: June 8, 1990
- Studio: Zeezicht Studios, Spaarnwoude, Netherlands
- Genre: Jazz
- Length: European: 46:00/North American: 52:55
- Label: Ariola
- Producer: Ulco Bed, Candy Dulfer

Candy Dulfer chronology
Saxuality (1990)	Sax-a-Go-Go (1993)

Professional ratings
Review scores
Source	Rating
AllMusic	4/5 stars

Saxuality is the debut album by Dutch alto saxophonist Candy Dulfer. Some versions of the album include the worldwide hit single "Lily Was Here" with Dave Stewart.

The mainly instrumental album debuted on No. 4 in the Dutch album chart and was certified Gold. The album peaked at No. 22 on the US Billboard 200, No. 27 in the UK Albums Chart and sold in excess of one million copies worldwide. It was nominated for the Grammy Award for Best Contemporary Jazz Album. The album was promoted by a tour in Europe and the United States.

== Track listing ==
European version
No.	Title	Writer(s)	Length
1.	"Pee Wee"	Ulco Bed	3:45
2.	"Saxuality"	Candy Dulfer, Ulco Bed	4:27
3.	"So What"	Miles Davis	4:54
4.	"Jazzid"	Candy Dulfer, Ulco Bed	4:21
5.	"Heavenly City"	Candy Dulfer, Ulco Bed	6:03
6.	"Donja"	Ulco Bed	5:17
7.	"There Goes the Neighbourhood"	Ulco Bed	3:55
8.	"Mr. Lee"	Ulco Bed	4:52
9.	"Get the Funk"	Candy Dulfer, Ulco Bed	4:16
10.	"Home Is Not a House"	Hans Dulfer, Franklin Batta	4:10
Total length:			46:00

North American version
No.	Title	Writer(s)	Length
1.	"Lily Was Here" (with Dave Stewart)	Dave Stewart	4:21
2.	"Pee Wee"	Ulco Bed	3:50
3.	"Saxuality"	Candy Dulfer, Ulco Bed	4:12
4.	"So What"	Miles Davis	5:00
5.	"Jazzid"	Candy Dulfer, Ulco Bed	4:21
6.	"Heavenly City"	Candy Dulfer, Ulco Bed	4:08
7.	"Donja"	Ulco Bed	5:18
8.	"There Goes the Neighbourhood"	Ulco Bed	3:55
9.	"Mr. Lee"	Ulco Bed	4:57
10.	"Get the Funk"	Candy Dulfer, Ulco Bed	4:15
11.	"Home Is Not a House"	Hans Dulfer, Franklin Batta	4:11
12.	"Lily Was Here (DNA Remix)" (with Dave Stewart)	Dave Stewart	4:27
Total length:			52:55

== Personnel ==
- Candy Dulfer – saxophone, additional keyboards, vocals (2, 5, 9), arrangements (3)
- Ulco Bed – keyboards, guitars, synth bass, drum programming, additional percussion, vocals (2, 5, 9), arrangements (3, 10)
- Fred Anindjola – keyboards (8)
- Bobby Van De Berg – keyboards (9, 10)
- Frans Hendrix – computer programming, additional percussion
- Dave Stewart – guitar on "Lily Was Here"
- Dimitri Veltkamp – bass guitar (3, 7, 8)
- Michel Van Schie – bass guitar (5, 6, 9, 10)
- Edwin Rath – drums (3, 8)
- Martino Latupeirissa – percussion (7–9)
- Benjamin Herman – sax section (9)
- Wies Ingwersen – backing vocals (5, 10)
- Franklin Batta – vocals (10)
- Patricia Balrak – backing vocals (10)
- Hugh Kanza – backing vocals (10)

== Production ==
- Ulco Bed – producer
- Candy Dulfer – producer
- Frans Hendrix – recording
- Susan Rogers – mixing at Westlake Audio (Los Angeles, California, USA)
- Bill Malina – mix assistant
- Chris Bellman – mastering at Bernie Grundman Mastering (Hollywood, California, USA)
- Ron Gessel – art direction
- Ron van der Vlugt – art direction
- Frans Jansen – photography
- Marcel van der Vlugt – photography
- Fase 2 – typesetting

== Charts ==
=== Weekly charts ===
Chart (1990–91)	Peak position
Australian Albums (ARIA)	133
German Albums (Offizielle Top 100)	39
Dutch Albums (Album Top 100)	3
Swiss Albums (Schweizer Hitparade)	30
Swedish Albums (Sverigetopplistan)	33
UK Albums (OCC)	27
US Billboard 200	22

=== Year-end charts ===
Chart (1990)	Position
Dutch Albums (Album Top 100)	42
Chart (1991)	Position
US Billboard 200	95

== Sales and certifications ==
Certifications for Saxuality
Region	Certification	Certified units/sales
Netherlands (NVPI)	Gold	50,000^{^}
^{^} Shipments figures based on certification alone.
