= Crazy Lake =

Lake in the state of California, United States

- Location within California
- Location: Fresno County, California
- Coordinates: 37.3021°N 118.8987°W
- Type: Lake
- Basin countries: United States

Crazy Lake is a lake in Fresno County, California, in the United States.

Crazy Lake was so named by a biologist who, noting the lack of scenery, wrote "anyone visiting this lake is crazy".

== See also ==
- List of lakes in California
