= Richard Templar =

British author

Richard Templar is the pen name of British author and editor Richard Craze who wrote several self-development books. The name was originally used as a collaborative pseudonym for Craze and his writing partner Templar, who died in 2006. He shares his "path to success" in a series of books, in which 100 simple "Rules" are presented to achieve success: be it in business management, wealth, financial prudence, work-life balance, parenting, love, or living a simple yet meaningful life in general. Rules are typically presented on two pages, making the books easy to read, and suitable for dipping into at random.

The books contain the distinctive use of British English. One Canadian reviewer writes that Templar's style is in neither of the "iron fisted" or "fuzzy warm" camps prevalent in American management books, but mixes both.

== Bibliography ==
- The Rules of Management: The Definitive Guide to Managerial Success (Paperback - 30 Nov 2004)
- The Rules of Life: A Personal Code for Living a Better, Happier, More Successful Kind of Life (Paperback - 8 Nov 2005)
- The Rules of Wealth: A Personal Code for Prosperity (Paperback - 31 Oct 2006)
- The Rules of Parenting: A Personal Code of Raising Happy, Confident Children (Paperback - 3 March 2008)
- The Rules of Love: A Personal Code for Happier, More Fulfilling Relationships (Pearson Education Limited, UK 2009)
- The Rules of Work, Expanded Edition: A Definitive Code for Personal Success (FT Press, June 22, 2010)
- The Rules of People, A Personal Code for getting the best from everyone (Pearson Education Limited, UK 2018)
- The Rules of Thinking, A Personal Code to think yourself smarter, wiser and happier (Pearson Education Limited, UK 2019)
- How To Get Things Done (without trying too hard), Expanded Edition (Pearson Education Limited, UK 2009)
- How to Spend Less Without Being Miserable (Pearson Prentice Hall 2009)
