= Lily Was Here =

1989 song by David A. Stewart and Candy Dulfer

Single by David A. Stewart featuring Candy Dulfer

from the album Lily Was Here and Saxuality
- Released: 1989
- Genre: Smooth jazz
- Length: 4:19
- Label: Anxious
- Songwriter: David A. Stewart
- Producer: David A. Stewart

David A. Stewart singles chronology
"Lily Was Here" (1989)	"Jute City" (1991)

Candy Dulfer singles chronology
"Lily Was Here" (1989)	"Saxuality" (1990)

"Lily Was Here" is an instrumental duet by English musician David A. Stewart and Dutch saxophonist Candy Dulfer. It was released as a single in 1989 from the soundtrack of the same name for the Dutch movie De Kassière, also known by the English title Lily Was Here. The song reached number one in the Netherlands and became a top-twenty hit in several other European countries, Australia, and the United States.

== Background ==
David A. Stewart invited Candy Dulfer, who had not previously released any of her material, to play the saxophone on this instrumental. The single became a major hit and stayed at the number one position for five weeks in the Netherlands. Because of this success, the single was also released in the United Kingdom, Europe, and the United States where it became a hit as well, reaching number six in the UK and even rising to number 11 in the tough US market. The success of this instrumental encouraged Dulfer to compose music for her own album, which she titled Saxuality.

== Recording ==
According to Candy's father, Hans Dulfer, on Dutch radio, the recording was done in just one take, actually a jam session, and at that time it was not meant to be released. This jam session was done at the end of a day of recording for the movie De Kassière, and Dave Stewart later decided to release this as a single.

== Track listings ==
CD maxi

1. "Lily Was Here" – 4:19
2. "Lily Was Here" (Space Centre Medical Unit Hum) – 8:10
3. "Lily Robs the Bank" – 2:33

CD maxi

1. "Lily Was Here" – 4:19
2. "Lily Robs the Bank" – 2:33
3. "Here Comes the Rain Again" – 6:00

7-inch single

1. "Lily Was Here" – 4:19
2. "Lily Robs the Bank" – 2:33

3-inch single

1. "Lily Was Here" – 4:19
2. "Lily Robs the Bank" – 2:33

12-inch maxi

1. "Lily Was Here" (Space Centre Medical Unit Hum) – 8:10
2. "Lily Was Here" (Orbital Space Lab Mix) – 6:57
3. "Lily Robs the Bank" – 2:33

== Personnel ==
General

- Guitar by David A. Stewart
- Saxophone by Candy Dulfer
- Drums by Swedish producer & percussionist Olle Romo (formerly Eurythmics drummer mid-to-late 80's)
- Artwork by The Leisure Company

"Lily Was Here"

- Engineered by Stephen McLaughlin
- Remixed by Gary Bradshaw

"Lily Was Here" (Space Centre Medical Unit Hum)

- Engineered by Steve McLaughlin
- Remixed by The Orb

Lily Was Here (Orbital Space Lab Mix)

- Remixed by The Orb

== Charts ==
=== Weekly charts ===
Chart (1989–1991)	Peak position
Australia (ARIA)	10
Austria (Ö3 Austria Top 40)	18
Belgium (Ultratop 50 Flanders)	2
Canada Top Singles (RPM)	22
Europe (Eurochart Hot 100)	10
Finland (Suomen virallinen lista)	5
France (SNEP)	13
Greece (IFPI)	2
Ireland (IRMA)	10
Netherlands (Dutch Top 40)	1
Netherlands (Single Top 100)	1
Norway (VG-lista)	2
Sweden (Sverigetopplistan)	10
Switzerland (Schweizer Hitparade)	10
UK Singles (Official Charts)	6
US Billboard Hot 100	11
US Adult Contemporary (Billboard)	6
US Hot R&B/Hip-Hop Songs (Billboard)	60
US Cash Box Top 100	9
West Germany (GfK)	17

=== Year-end charts ===
Chart (1989)	Position
Netherlands (Dutch Top 40)	23
Netherlands (Single Top 100)	15

Chart (1990)	Position
Australia (ARIA)	60
Belgium (Ultratop)	44
Europe (Eurochart Hot 100)	49
Germany (Media Control)	49
Sweden (Topplistan)	59
UK Singles (OCC)	41

Chart (1991)	Position
US Adult Contemporary (Billboard)	41

== Certifications ==
Region	Certification	Certified units/sales
Australia (ARIA)	Gold	35,000^{^}
France (SNEP)	Silver	200,000^{*}
Netherlands (NVPI)	Platinum	100,000^{^}
^{*} Sales figures based on certification alone.^{^} Shipments figures based on certification alone.
