= Sax-a-Go-Go =

Studio album by Candy Dulfer
- Released: 1993
- Studios: Zeezicht Studios, Spaarnwoude, Netherlands
- Genre: Smooth jazz
- Length: 53:57
- Label: Ariola
- Producers: Ulco Bed and Candy Dulfer

Candy Dulfer chronology
Saxuality (1990)	Sax-a-Go-Go (1993)	Big Girl (1995)

Professional ratings
Review scores
Source	Rating
AllMusic	3/5 stars

Sax-a-Go-Go is the second album by Dutch alto saxophonist Candy Dulfer, released in 1993. It entered the US Billboard Top Contemporary Jazz Albums chart at No. 5 in February 1994, remaining on the chart for 31 weeks. The album peaked at number 79 in Australia. The album includes a version of Eugene McDaniels' Vietnam War protest song "Compared to What", and "I Can't Make You Love Me", a hit for Bonnie Raitt from her album Luck of the Draw (1991).

== Track listing ==
1. "2 Funky" (Ulco Bed) – 4:50
2. "Sax-a-Go-Go" (featuring Easy Mo Bee) (Easy Mo Bee, Candy Dulfer) – 4:54
3. "Mister Marvin" (Ulco Bed) – 5:33
4. "Man in the Desert" (Candy Dulfer, Ulco Bed) – 5:37
5. "Bob's Jazz" (Ulco Bed) – 4:53
6. "Jamming" (Candy Dulfer, Ulco Bed) – 5:21
7. "I Can't Make You Love Me" (Allen Shamblin, Mike Reid) – 4:35
8. "Pick Up the Pieces" (Roger Ball, Hamish Stuart, White, Robbie McIntosh, Owen McIntyre, Malcolm Duncan, Alan Gorrie, Yze) – 4:12
9. "Compared to What" (J Mac Daniels) – 5:56
10. "Sunday Afternoon" (Prince) – 8:06

=== Track listing (US/Canada) ===
1. "2 Funky" (Ulco Bed) – 4:50
2. "Sax-a-Go-Go" (featuring Easy Mo Bee) (Easy Mo Bee, Candy Dulfer) – 4:54
3. "Mister Marvin" (Ulco Bed) – 5:33
4. "Man in the Desert" (Candy Dulfer, Ulco Bed) – 5:37
5. "Bob's Jazz" (Ulco Bed) – 4:53
6. "Jamming" (Candy Dulfer, Ulco Bed) – 5:21
7. "I Can't Make You Love Me" (Allen Shamblin, Mike Reid) – 4:35
8. "Pick Up the Pieces (Single Version)" (Roger Ball, Hamish Stuart, White, Robbie McIntosh, Owen McIntyre, Malcom Duncan, Alan Gorrie, Yze) – 4:02
9. "Sunday Afternoon" (Prince) – 8:06
10. "2 Funky (Radio Version)" (Ulco Bed) – 4:36

== Personnel ==
- Candy Dulfer – vocals, alto, tenor, baritone, and soprano saxophone
- Ulco Bed – bass guitar, guitar, drums, percussion, vocals, keyboards
- Frans Hendriks – percussion, drums

== Sales and certifications ==
Certifications for Sax-a-Go-Go
Region	Certification	Certified units/sales
Japan (RIAJ)	Gold	100,000^{^}
Netherlands (NVPI)	Gold	50,000^{^}
^{^} Shipments figures based on certification alone.
