= Candy Store (album) =

Studio album by Candy Dulfer
- Released: September 2007
- Studio: Sugarhouse Studios, Zeezicht Studios, Spaarnvoude, The Netherlands
- Genre: Jazz, smooth jazz
- Length: 54:06
- Label: Heads Up
- Producer: Candy Dulfer, Dave Love

Candy Dulfer chronology
Live at Montreux 2002 (2005)	Candy Store (2007)	Funked Up (2009)

Professional ratings
Review scores
Source	Rating
Allmusic	4/5 stars
Jazzreview.com	(not rated) link

Candy Store is the ninth studio album by Dutch saxophonist Candy Dulfer. The album was released in 2007 by Heads Up and was produced by Dulfer and Dave Love.

Candy Store reached No. 2 on the Billboard magazine Top Contemporary Jazz chart. The song "L.A. Citylights" reached No. 1 in Smooth Jazz National Airplay charts in the United States. At AllMusic, Jonathan Widran called the album "one of contemporary jazz's finest and funkiest releases of 2007."

== Track listing ==
1. "Candy" (Chance Howard) – 4:11
2. "L.A. Citylights" (Bank, Dulfer, Howard) – 3:45
3. "Music = Love" (Bank, Bed, Dulfer) – 3:54
4. "La Cabana" (Bank, Dulfer) – 3:03
5. "11:58" (Bank, Bed, Dulfer) – 4:02
6. "Summertime" (Bank, Bed, Dulfer) – 4:28
7. "Soulsax" (Bank, Bed, Dulfer) – 4:24
8. "Smokin' Gun" (Bed) – 4:51
9. "Back to Juan" (Bank, Bed, Dulfer, Howard) – 4:27
10. "If I Ruled the World" (Bank, Bed, Dulfer) – 4:43
11. "Everytime" (Bank, Bed, Dulfer) – 4:32

Bonus track on US release

- 12. "Finsbury Park, Cafe 67 (2007 Version)" (Bank, Dulfer, Gert Jan Mulder) – 4:03

Bonus tracks on Europe release

- 13. "My Philosophy" – 3:54"
- 14. "Bum Bum" – 3:52"

== Personnel ==
- Candy Dulfer – saxophone, keyboards, vocals
- Louk Boudesteijn – trombone
- Jan van Duikeren – trumpet
- Thomas Bank – keyboards
- Ulco Bed – bass guitar, guitar
- Manuel Hugas – bass guitar
- John Blackwell – drums
- Kasper van Kooten – drums
- Chance Howard – background vocals
- Trijntje Oosterhuis – background vocals
