= Dave Stewart (Eurythmics) =

English musician, songwriter and record producer (born 1952)

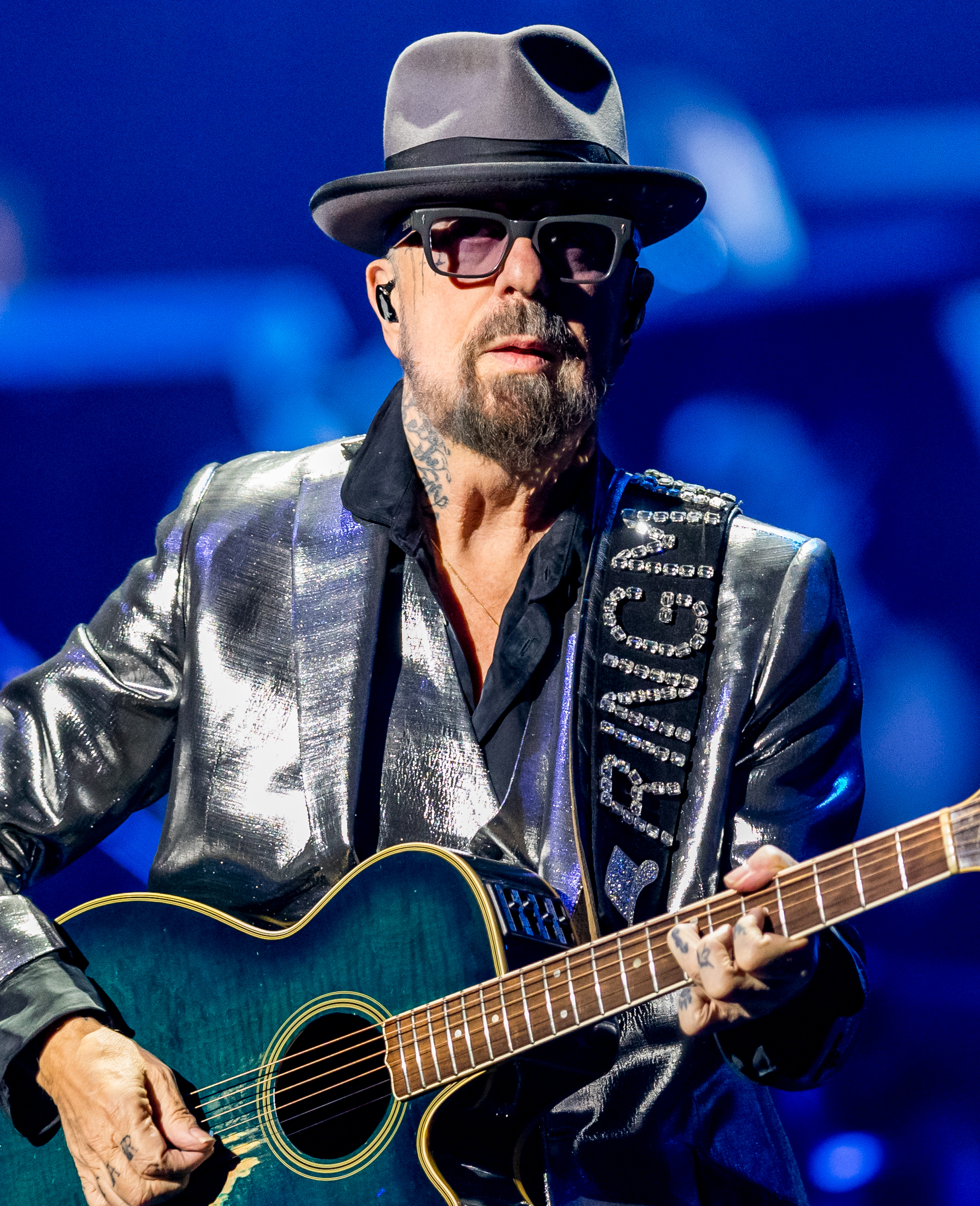
- Stewart performing live in 2024

Background information
- Also known as: Jean Guiot
- Born: David Allan Stewart; 9 September 1952 (age 74); Sunderland, England
- Genres: Pop rock; synth-pop; new wave; electronica
- Occupations: Singer-songwriter; musician; record producer
- Instruments: Guitar; vocals; bass guitar; keyboards
- Years active: 1971–present
- Labels: RCA; Anxious; Surfdog; The Artist Network; Kobalt; Weapons of Mass Entertainment
- Formerly of: The Tourists; Eurythmics; The Spiritual Cowboys; Vegas; Platinum Weird; SuperHeavy

David Allan Stewart (born 9 September 1952) is an English musician, songwriter and record producer, best known for Eurythmics, his successful professional partnership with Annie Lennox. He won Best British Producer at the 1986, 1987 and 1990 Brit Awards. Stewart (along with Lennox) was inducted into the Songwriters Hall of Fame in 2020 and the duo were inducted into the Rock and Roll Hall of Fame in 2022. Outside of Eurythmics, Stewart has written and produced songs for artists such as Ringo Starr, Stevie Nicks, Mick Jagger and Tom Petty.

== Early life ==
Stewart was born on 9 September 1952, in Sunderland, England. He is the son of John ("Jack") and Sadie Stewart. Stewart is distantly related to the Dukes of Northumberland. He attended Barnes Infants and Junior School and Bede Grammar School for Boys.

Whilst still in his teens, Stewart secured a record deal as part of folk-rock band Longdancer. Despite being signed to Elton John's record label, The Rocket Record Company, they did not achieve commercial success. He also collaborated with Brian Harrison to produce an EP on the Sunderland Multicord label (label number MULT-SH-1, producer Ken McKenzie), recording two songs ("Girl" and "Green She Said") from a school musical production written by English teacher Dick Bradshaw, one traditional number ("A Blacksmith Courted Me") and a song written by Dave and Brian ("Deep December"). After leaving Wearside, Stewart spent several years living in squats in London. In late 1976, he was introduced to Annie Lennox, by Paul Jacobs. Soon, Stewart and Lennox became romantically involved. By 1977, the pair had teamed up with Sunderland musician Peet Coombes, releasing a single on Logo Records as the Catch. The band then developed into the Tourists, which enjoyed modest success, including a hit in 1979 with a cover of the Dusty Springfield hit "I Only Want to Be with You".

== Eurythmics ==
The Tourists split up in 1980, as did Stewart and Lennox, though the pair continued to work together. They formed a new musical project named Eurythmics. After a string of hit singles and albums, the duo split in 1990, but reunited in 1999 for the album Peace and another world tour. Lennox and Stewart worked together again in 2005, recording two new tracks for the greatest hits package Ultimate Collection, released to coincide with Eurythmics' 25th anniversary.

== Post-Eurythmics ==
When Eurythmics dissolved in 1990, Stewart moved to France and immediately released a self-titled album with his new band, The Spiritual Cowboys, which reached No. 38 on the UK album charts. The song "Party Town" was featured in the 1990 film Flatliners. A second album, Honest, followed in 1991. Both records went Gold in France, where Stewart concentrated his efforts.

In 1992, Stewart collaborated with singer Terry Hall (formerly of The Specials, Fun Boy Three and The Colourfield) on the project Vegas. The duo released one self-titled album but this was commercially unsuccessful, though one of the singles from the album ("Possessed") made the UK Top 40.

In 1993, Stewart appeared in an Apple Inc. advertisement for the Power Macintosh in which he riffed on the word "power". He also had a small cameo as a computer hacker in the 1995 film Hackers.

In 1995, Stewart released a solo album titled Greetings from the Gutter. The album was not a commercial success, peaking at number 93 in the UK, though Stewart scored a minor UK hit with the single "Heart Of Stone" which reached number 36. He then released another album, Sly-Fi, in 1998, which was first made available on the internet.

In 1995, Stewart appeared in an advert for BT in which he sang the track "Secrets" which was made specifically for BT to be used in the advert.

In November 2002, Stewart worked with former South African president Nelson Mandela. Stewart came up with the idea of turning Mandela's prison number into a telephone number, then wrote and recorded songs with Paul McCartney, Bono and The Edge of U2, and various other artists. The songs could only be heard if the telephone number was dialled and the listener was donating during the telephone call. He then began organising the 46664 campaign and a series of concerts to support the fight against HIV/AIDS in South Africa.

In 2007, Stewart announced on his MySpace page that he would be playing live concerts showcasing his entire career. According to the announcement, he was to be accompanied by various guest musicians as well as a 30-piece orchestra. Additionally, Stewart has stated that for the first time in many years, he had been writing new songs on his guitar, although he had no plans at that time for a new solo album.

On the project, The Dave Stewart Songbook, he wrote a large coffee table-size book full of stories and photographs and also re-recorded 21 hit songs which have been co-written or co-produced by him during the past decades and were originally released by artists such as No Doubt, Shakespears Sister, Bryan Ferry, Celine Dion, Bob Geldof, Tom Petty and the Heartbreakers, Jon Bon Jovi and Eurythmics. Also included is the song "American Prayer" written by Stewart with Bono of U2, for which Stewart recorded a video in support of the campaign of US presidential candidate Barack Obama, featuring various film and music stars, which premiered on YouTube on 23 August 2008. Stewart also released a new solo track, "Let's Do It Again", in 2008. In July 2010, Stewart recorded his first solo album of new material since 1998's Sly-Fi. Entitled The Blackbird Diaries after the Nashville, Tennessee studio where it was recorded, the album includes duets with Stevie Nicks, Martina McBride, Colbie Caillat and The Secret Sisters. Stewart made a film of the making of the album and also filmed a live concert in Nashville at the Belcourt Theatre on 9 December 2010.

In May 2011, it was announced that Mick Jagger of the Rolling Stones had formed a new supergroup called SuperHeavy, which included Stewart, Joss Stone, Damian Marley and A. R. Rahman.

In May 2012, it was announced that Stewart would be playing four UK shows in September 2012 to support the release of his new album The Ringmaster General.

In 2013, Stewart released the album Lucky Numbers, which was recorded on a boat in the South Pacific for 12 days.

In October 2017, Stewart appeared on a German TV programme marking the 40th year of the stage career of German singer Nena, with whom he performed their jointly written track, "Be My Rebel".

== Other projects ==
=== Writer and producer ===
Along with Annie Lennox, Stewart co-wrote the vast majority of Eurythmics' recordings, and he produced or co-produced all of Eurythmics' albums. Once the band became established, he also became a producer of other artists. In 1985, as well as producing Eurythmics' hit album Be Yourself Tonight, Stewart co-produced the album Southern Accents for Tom Petty and the Heartbreakers, as well as co-writing several songs for the album including the hit "Don't Come Around Here No More". The same year, Stewart also produced the debut solo album by Feargal Sharkey, which included the UK number one hit "A Good Heart". Due to these accomplishments, Stewart won "Best Producer" at the 1986 BRIT Awards in London. He would win the award again in 1987 and 1990.

Stewart would go on to write and produce for a variety of other artists throughout the years. In 1986, he collaborated with Bob Geldof on tracks for his debut solo album Deep in the Heart of Nowhere. Working together, the duo named themselves "The Brothers of Doom". Also in 1986, he co-produced the album Three Hearts in the Happy Ending Machine by Daryl Hall. The same year, he co-wrote and produced the song "Is This Love?" by Alison Moyet, a UK number 3.

Stewart also co-wrote and co-produced several tracks for Mick Jagger's 1987 album Primitive Cool.

In 1989, Stewart produced Radio Silence, the debut album by Russian singer-songwriter Boris Grebenshchikov.

Stewart (credited under the pseudonym "Jean Guiot"), along with his then-wife Siobhan Fahey and Marcella Detroit, co-wrote the Shakespears Sister 1992 hit single "Stay" as well as several other tracks for their second album Hormonally Yours (1992). Also in 1992, Fahey provided vocals on "Walk into the Wind" for Stewart's group Vegas (with Terry Hall, Olle Romö and Emmanuel 'Manu' Guiot).

In 1993, Stewart co-wrote two tracks for German punk rock-singer Nina Hagen, which were published on her sixth solo studio album Revolution Ballroom. He can also be heard on keyboards and contributed background vocals.

In 1996, Stewart produced the debut album by Alisha's Attic, Alisha Rules the World, and wrote a few tracks on the third Shakespears Sister album #3 (actually a solo album by Siobhan Fahey, which Fahey ended up releasing in 2004).

In 1997, Stewart co-produced the album Destination Anywhere for Jon Bon Jovi, and also co-wrote two tracks. The same year, he produced and co-wrote the album Come Alive with the actress and singer Rhona Mitra, who was in character as Lara Croft for the recording, because she was the official model for the character at that time. In 1999, Stewart and Mitra collaborated on a second Lara Croft album, titled Female Icon.

Stewart collaborated with Bryan Ferry on his 2002 album Frantic, co-writing several tracks and co-producing one of them.

He also co-wrote "Friend or Foe" for the Russian pop duo t.A.T.u., which is on their 2005 album Dangerous and Moving.

In 2008, Stewart was brought in by Ringo Starr to produce his album Liverpool 8, after Starr dismissed the album's original producer, Mark Hudson. Hudson's work on some tracks earned both Stewart and Hudson credits as co-producers (along with Starr himself).

In 2010, Stewart announced on his Twitter account he was co-writing and producing the new studio album by Stevie Nicks. The album, entitled In Your Dreams, was co-produced by Glen Ballard and released in May 2011.

In 2010, Stewart co-wrote and co-produced two songs with writer and composer Mark Warford, "Lover Earth" and "Time, Faith, Love" for the charity-focused dramatised audio production A Voyage For Soldier Miles.

On 24 February 2011, Stewart tweeted that he had just produced a new album by Joss Stone, stating that they also wrote 10 songs together.

On 10 October 2011, Stewart released a new song called "Leap of Faith" in collaboration with Greek singer Anna Vissi. The official clip of the song was released in Vissi's fan club YouTube channel. Two days later, the Stewart produced Fire EP for artist Orianthi was released as an iTunes download.

He has worked occasionally with American ska-punk band No Doubt, co-writing "Underneath It All" for their 2001 release Rock Steady and "Sparkle" for their 2012 release Push and Shove.

In 2013, he worked with singer Lauren Harris on the pop rock project Kingdom of I. The track "Crying at the Disco" was released as a free download on SoundCloud later that year.

Stewart co-wrote and produced New Zealand singer Jon Stevens' album Starlight, which was released in March 2017 and features a blues and soul influenced rock / powerpop sound. Parallel to that, Stewart co-wrote and produced Australian singer Vanessa Amorosi's studio album, which features "soul gospel" music. The album, Memphis Love, was released in November 2023 on Stewart's independent label, Bay Street Records.

=== Film, television and soundtrack work ===
Stewart co-wrote, with Mick Jagger and Daryl Hall, the theme song for the 1986 comedy film Ruthless People. He took a greater involvement in the film industry in 1989 by writing and producing the soundtrack Lily Was Here for the Dutch film De Kassière (English title Lily Was Here). The single, also called "Lily Was Here" and featuring saxophone player Candy Dulfer, topped the Dutch charts for five weeks. The single also reached the UK Top 10 and peaked at No. 11 on the Billboard Hot 100 in the summer of 1990.

Though he had previously directed music videos, he made his feature film directorial debut in 2000 with Honest, a black comedy set in Swinging London in the late 1960s featuring three members of the British girl group All Saints.

Stewart also performed the song "Everybody, All Over The World (Join The Celebration)" for the 2004 film Around the World in 80 Days.

Stewart, in conjunction with his brother John J. Stewart of Oil Factory Productions, and in collaboration with music critic and author Robert Palmer and documentary filmmaker Robert Mugge, made a documentary dealing with Delta Blues music. Deep Blues: A Musical Pilgrimage to the Crossroads, released in 1991, was filmed in Memphis, Tennessee and various north Mississippi counties. Palmer narrated.

Stewart was the main interviewer for the HBO series Off the Record, which is a show that highlights songwriting and features prominent musicians. The pilot aired on HBO on 24 November 2006 and featured Bono and The Edge from U2.

Stewart collaborated with Mick Jagger to record songs which appear on the soundtrack to the movie Alfie, released in 2004. The soundtrack includes the critically acclaimed song "Old Habits Die Hard", which won a Golden Globe award for Best Original Song from a Motion Picture.

In 2008, Stewart collaborated with Cindy Gomez for Nokia's music rhythm game Dance Fabulous. Stewart wrote and produced original songs for the game.

In 2010, the song "Love Lives", originally from the 2009 EP Let's Do It Again, was included in the soundtrack of the movie Repo Men.

In 2012, together with Rosemary Reed, Stewart was the executive co-producer of Living The Life series on Sky Arts. He also recorded an exclusive soundtrack for the new episodes.

Stewart is the co-creator and executive producer of the 2012 ABC sitcom Malibu Country starring Reba McEntire.

Stewart created and executive produces the NBC unscripted series Songland, which gives new songwriters a chance to have their original compositions recorded by an established artist, with a single released immediately following each episode. The panel of judges on Songland include Ryan Tedder, Ester Dean and Shane McAnally. The series premiered in the summer of 2019 and averaged 5.1 million viewers per episode, the most for a new unscripted series that summer. NBC announced that the series had been renewed for a second season in September 2019.

=== Musical theatre ===
Stewart wrote the musical Barbarella, based on the 1968 film, which premiered in Vienna on 11 March 2004. Stewart later wrote music and lyrics (with Glen Ballard) for Ghost the Musical, which premiered at the Manchester Opera House in March 2011, ahead of a transfer to the Piccadilly Theatre in London's West End in June the same year; the show subsequently opened on Broadway in 2012.

In 2021, Stewart collaborated with Joss Stone to write and produce a new stage production of The Time Traveller's Wife, based on the Audrey Niffenegger novel of the same name. The show received its premiere in September 2022 at the Storyhouse in Chester, before transferring to London's West End, where it began previews at the Apollo Theatre in October 2023.

=== Record label ===
Though most of Stewart's own music (specifically with Eurythmics) was released via the RCA/BMG label, he also formed his own record label in the 1980s called Anxious Records. The label has included a roster of artists such as Terry Hall, Londonbeat, Chris Braide and Curve vocalist Toni Halliday.

=== Platinum Weird ===
In 2006, Stewart resurrected Platinum Weird, a band he purportedly formed in the early 1970s in London with singer Erin Grace, but which was in reality created in 2004. According to the fictional account, Erin was moody and mysterious, and disappeared shortly before the band's eponymous album was due to be released in 1974. Platinum Weird features noted songwriter Kara DioGuardi on vocals and the band has re-recorded some of the fictional original band's songs and some new ones as well for an upcoming album. The album was produced by John Shanks.

In July 2006, VH1 premiered a mockumentary entitled Rock Legends – Platinum Weird, an examination of the band's unusual story, complete with cameo appearances from such rock legends as Mick Jagger, Annie Lennox, Ringo Starr and Elton John, all reminiscing about the former band's short-lived heyday and their impressions of the mysterious Erin Grace. The album was further promoted by a series of bogus World Wide Web fan sites, some of which are registered by the New Media Department of Interscope Records and hosted on the same server as interscope.com, and related false documents for the "lost" group.

=== Web3 Music ===
In 2021, Stewart co-founded SongBits, a web3 music platform that focuses on fan-artist engagement.

== Bibliography ==
- Walk-In (2006); Virgin Comics
- Zombie Broadway (2008); Virgin Comics
- The Dave Stewart Songbook: The Stories Behind the Songs; September 2008; Surfdog; ISBN 0615235689
- The Business Playground: Where Creativity and Commerce Collide; with Mark Simmons; July 2010; New Riders; ISBN 032172058X
- Sweet Dreams are Made of This: A Life in Music; February 2016; Penguin; ISBN 0451477685

== Personal life ==
Stewart was in a relationship with Annie Lennox for three years in the late 1970s, before they formed the Eurythmics.

He was married from 1972 to 1977 to Pamela Wilkinson.

In 1987, Stewart married Irish singer Siobhan Fahey (of Bananarama and Shakespears Sister. The couple have two sons, Sam (guitarist with the group Lo Moon) and Django. They divorced in 1996.

On 4 August 2001, Stewart married Dutch photographer Anoushka Fisz, with whom he has two daughters, Kaya and Indya. In 2004, Stewart and Fisz moved to Hollywood so Stewart could concentrate on his soundtrack work. They renewed their marriage vows in 2013.

He is a Sunderland A.F.C. supporter and still watches their games. As a child, his ambition was to play for the club.

He accompanied his daughter, Kaya, during her audition for the 21st season of American Idol, which aired on 26 March 2023.

== Awards and recognition ==
In 2000, Stewart received the O2 Silver Clef Award. He was inducted into the UK Music Hall of Fame in 2005, and won the Music Producers Guild Outstanding Contribution to UK Music Award in 2015. Eurythmics were nominated for the Rock and Roll Hall of Fame in 2017. Eurythmics were inducted into the Rock & Roll Hall of Fame in 2022.

Award	Year	Nominee(s)	Category	Result	Ref.
BMI London Awards	2003	"Underneath It All"	Song of the Year	Won	
BMI London Awards	2003	"Underneath It All"	Pop Award	Won	

=== Grammy Awards ===
Year	Nominee / work	Award	Result
1983	Eurythmics	Best New Artist	Nominated
1984	Sweet Dreams (Video album)	Grammy Award for Best Music Video; Long Form	Nominated
1985	"Would I Lie to You?"	Best Rock Performance by Group or Duo with Vocal	Nominated
1985	"Sisters Are Doin' It for Themselves"	Best R&B Performance by a Group or Duo with Vocal	Nominated
1986	"Missionary Man"	Best Rock Performance by a Group or Duo with Vocal	Won
1989	"Savage"	Grammy Award for Best Music Video; Long Form	Nominated
1990	"We Too Are One"	Grammy Award for Best Music Video; Long Form	Nominated

=== Brit Awards ===
Year	Nominee / work	Award	Result
1984	Eurythmics	Best British Group	Nominated
1986	Eurythmics	Best British Group	Nominated
1986	Be Yourself Tonight (Eurythmics)	Best British Album	Nominated
1986	Stewart	British Producer of the Year	Won
1987	Eurythmics	Best British Group	Nominated
1987	Stewart	British Producer of the Year	Won
1990	Eurythmics	Best British Group	Nominated
1990	We Too Are One (Eurythmics)	Best British Album	Nominated
1990	Stewart	British Producer of the Year	Won
1990	"Don't Ask Me Why" (Eurythmics)	Best British Video	Nominated
1992	Stewart	Producer of the Year	Nominated
1999	Eurythmics	Outstanding Contribution to Music	Won

=== Ivor Novello Awards ===
Year	Nominee / work	Award	Result
1984	Lennox and Stewart	Songwriters of the Year	Won
1987	"It's Alright (Baby's Coming Back)" (Eurythmics)	Best Contemporary Song	Won
1987	Lennox and Stewart	Songwriters of the Year	Won -

=== Film, publishing and soundtrack awards ===
Year	Nominee / work	Award	Result
2003	"Underneath It All"	BMI London Awards, Song of the Year	Won
2004	"Old Habits Die Hard" from Alfie; Stewart with Mick Jagger	Best Song, Las Vegas Film Critics Award	Won
2005	"Old Habits Die Hard" from Alfie; Stewart with Mick Jagger	Best Song, Critics Choice Awards	Won
2005	"Old Habits Die Hard" from Alfie; Stewart with Mick Jagger	Golden Globe Award for Best Song	Won
2005	"Old Habits Die Hard" from Alfie; Stewart with Mick Jagger	World Soundtrack Award for Best Original Song Written Directly for a Film	Won

=== MTV Video Music Awards ===
Year	Nominee / work	Award	Result
1984	"Sweet Dreams"	Best New Artist	Won
1985	"Would I Lie to You?	Five nominations, including Best Group	Nominated
1987	"Missionary Man"	Five nominations, including Best Group	Nominated
1988	"You Have Placed A Chill in My Heart"	Best Direction	Nominated
1988	"I Need A Man"	Best Group	Nominated

== Discography ==
=== Studio albums ===
Year	Album	Notes
1989	Lily Was Here (soundtrack)	David A. Stewart
1990	Dave Stewart and the Spiritual Cowboys	Dave Stewart and the Spiritual Cowboys
1991	Honest	Dave Stewart and the Spiritual Cowboys
1994	Greetings from the Gutter	
1998	Sly-Fi	
2008	The Dave Stewart Songbook Vol. 1	
2011	The Blackbird Diaries	
2012	The Ringmaster General	
2013	Lucky Numbers	Guest stars on the album including Martina McBride, Karen Elson, Vanessa Amorosi, Holly Quin-Ankrah, Laura Michelle Kelly and Ann Marie Calhoun
2022	Ebony McQueen	
2023	Cloud Walking	Dave Stewart & Hannah Koppenburg
2025	Dave Does Dylan	Dave Stewart

=== Singles ===
List of singles, with selected chart positions
Year	Single	Peak chart positions										Album
Year	Single	UK	NLD	BEL (FL)	FRA	GER	AUT	SWE	NOR	AUS	US	Album
1989	"Lily Was Here" (feat. Candy Dulfer)	6	1	2	13	17	18	10	2	10	11	Lily Was Here
1990	"Jack Talking"	—	—	—	—	—	—	—	—	57	—	
1991	"Love Shines"	—	—	—	—	—	—	—	—	144	—	
1991	"Crown of Madness"	—	—	—	—	—	—	—	—	192	—	
1991	"Jute City"	—	—	—	—	—	—	—	—	—	—	Jute City
1994	"Heart of Stone"	36	—	—	—	52	12	31	—	190	—	Greetings from the Gutter
1995	"Jealousy"	86	—	—	—	83	—	—	—	169	—	Greetings from the Gutter
1995	"Secret"	89	—	—	—	—	—	—	—	—	—	single only
1998	"Happy to Be Here"	—	—	—	—	—	—	—	—	—	—	SlyFi
1998	"Cookie" (feat. Candy Dulfer)	—	—	—	—	—	—	—	—	—	—	Cookie's Fortune
1999	"All Over the World" (Cricket World Cup '99 official theme song)	—	—	—	—	—	—	—	—	—	—	single only
2004	"Old Habits Die Hard" (with Mick Jagger and Sheryl Crow)	45	60	10	—	62	—	—	—	—	—	Alfie
"—" denotes releases that did not chart or were not released.

== Collaborations ==
With Anastacia

- Anastacia (Epic Records, 2004)
- It's a Man's World (BMG, 2012)

With Jimmy Cliff

- Fantastic Plastic People (Artist Network, 2002)

With Billy Ray Cyrus

- Back to Tennessee (Lyric Street, 2009)

With Bob Dylan

- Knocked Out Loaded (Columbia Records, 1986)

With Aretha Franklin

- Who's Zoomin' Who? (Arista Records, 1985)

With Bryan Ferry

- Frantic (Virgin Records, 2002)
- Olympia (Virgin Records, 2010)

With Nina Hagen

- Revolution Ballroom (Mercury Records, 1993)

With Daryl Hall

- Three Hearts in the Happy Ending Machine (RCA Records, 1986)

With Hall & Oates

- Change of Season (Arista Records, 1990)
- Marigold Sky (Push Records, 1997)

With Geri Halliwell

- Scream If You Wanna Go Faster (EMI, 2001)

With Mick Jagger

- Primitive Cool (Columbia Records, 1987)

With Jon Bon Jovi

- Destination Anywhere (Mercury Records, 1997)

With Martina McBride

- Eleven (Republic Nashville, 2011)

With Stevie Nicks

- In Your Dreams (Reprise Records, 2011)
- 24 Karat Gold: Songs from the Vault (Reprise Records, 2014)

With Sinéad O'Connor

- Faith and Courage (Atlantic Records, 2000)

With Orianthi Panagaris

- Heaven in This Hell (Robo Records, 2013)

With Katy Perry

- One of the Boys (Capitol Records, 2008)

With Tom Petty and the Heartbreakers

- Southern Accents (MCA Records, 1985)

With Carina Round

- Slow Motion Addict (Interscope Records, 2007)

With Feargal Sharkey

- Feargal Sharkey (A&M Records, 1985)

With Carly Simon

- Letters Never Sent (Arista Records, 1994)

With Ringo Starr

- Liverpool 8 (Capitol Records, 2008)
- Y Not (Universal Music Enterprises, 2010)
- Ringo 2012 (Universal Music Enterprises, 2012)
- Postcards from Paradise (Universal Music Enterprises, 2015)
- Give More Love (Universal Music Enterprises, 2017)
- What's My Name (Universal Music Enterprises, 2019)

With Joss Stone

- LP1 (Surfdog Records, 2011)
- Never Forget My Love (Bay Street, 2022)

With Shania Twain

- Queen of Me (Republic Records, 2023)

With The Wilsons

- The Wilsons (Polygram Records, 1997)

With Robin Zander

- Robin Zander (Interscope Records, 1993)
