= Candy Dulfer =

Dutch jazz and pop saxophonist (born 1969)

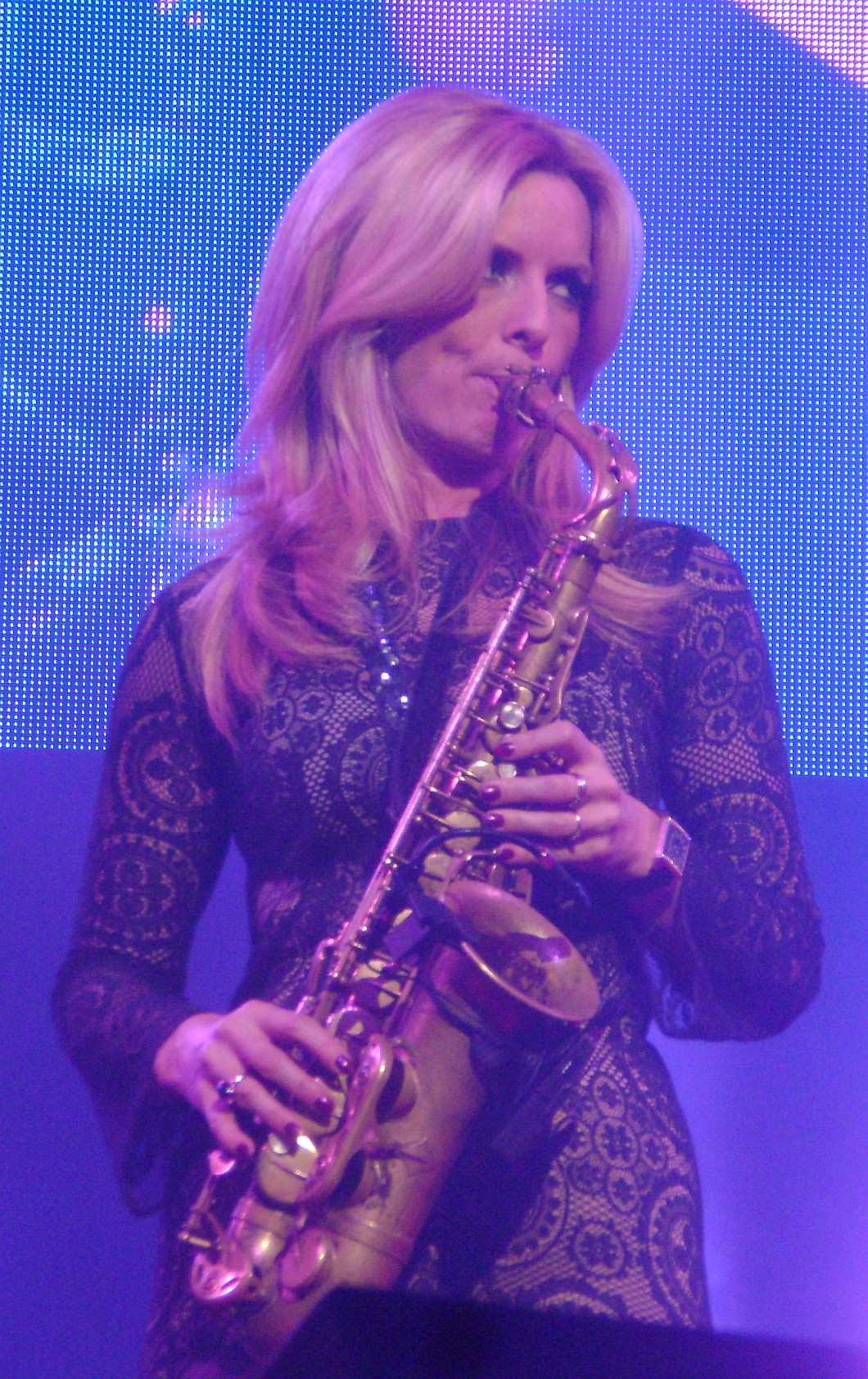
- Candy Dulfer in 2009

Background information
- Born: 19 September 1969 (age 57); Amsterdam, Netherlands
- Genres: Jazz, funk, soul
- Occupation: Musician
- Instruments: Alto saxophone; keyboards; EWI
- Years active: 1981–present
- Labels: BMG, N-Coded, Eagle, Heads Up, Mascot
- Website: candydulfer.nl

Candy Dulfer (born 19 September 1969) is a Dutch jazz and pop saxophonist. She is the daughter of jazz saxophonist Hans Dulfer. She began playing at age six and founded her band Funky Stuff when she was fourteen. Her breakthrough came with her appearance as the opening act on Madonna's European tour in 1987. Her debut album Saxuality (1990) received a Grammy nomination. She has performed and recorded with her dad Hans, Prince, Dave Stewart, Van Morrison, Angie Stone, Maceo Parker and Rick Braun and has performed live with Alan Parsons (1995), Pink Floyd (1990), and Tower of Power (2014). She hosted the Dutch television series Candy Meets... (2007), in which she interviewed musicians. In 2013, she became a judge in the fifth season of the Dutch version of X Factor.

== Early life ==
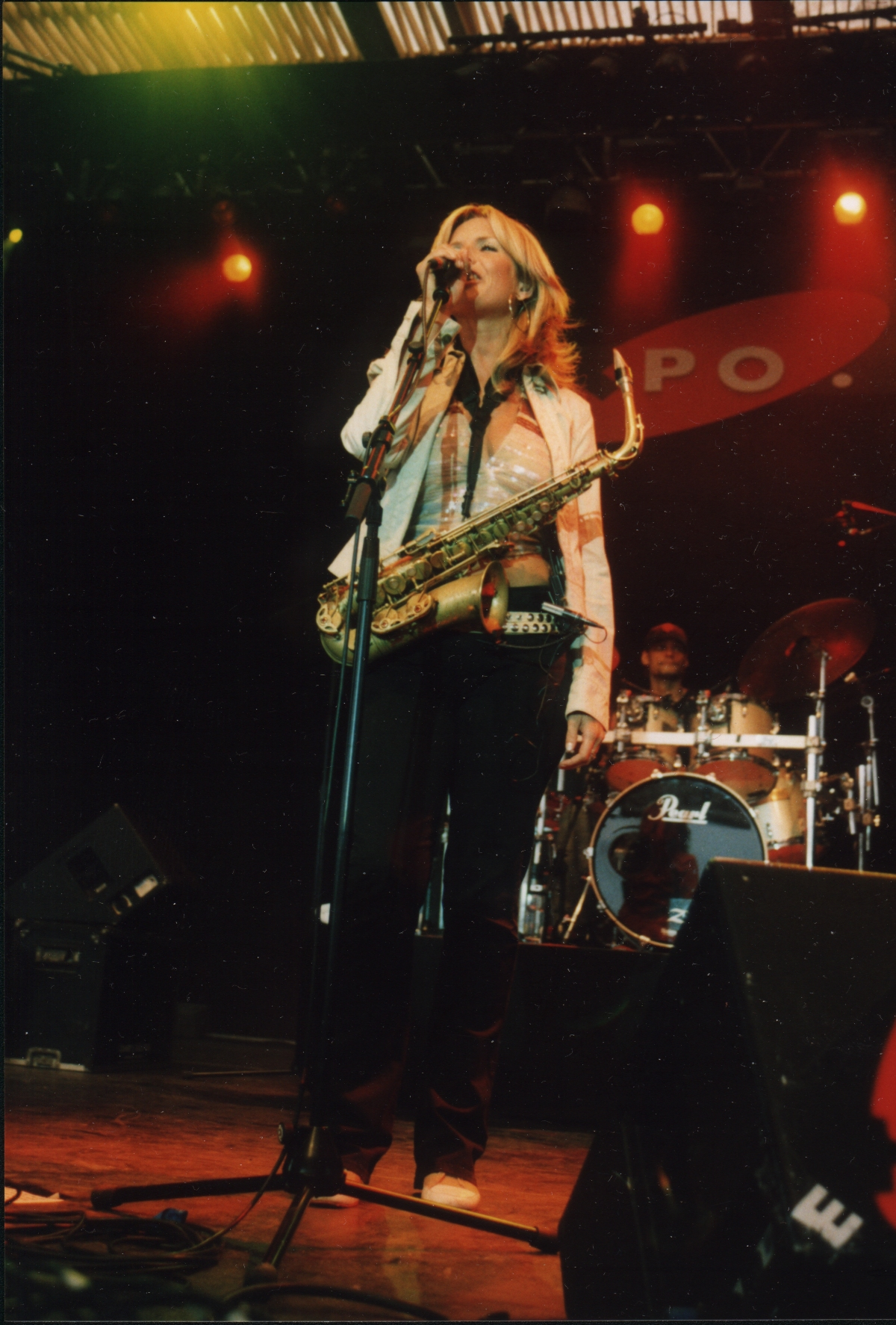
Candy Dulfer in 2002

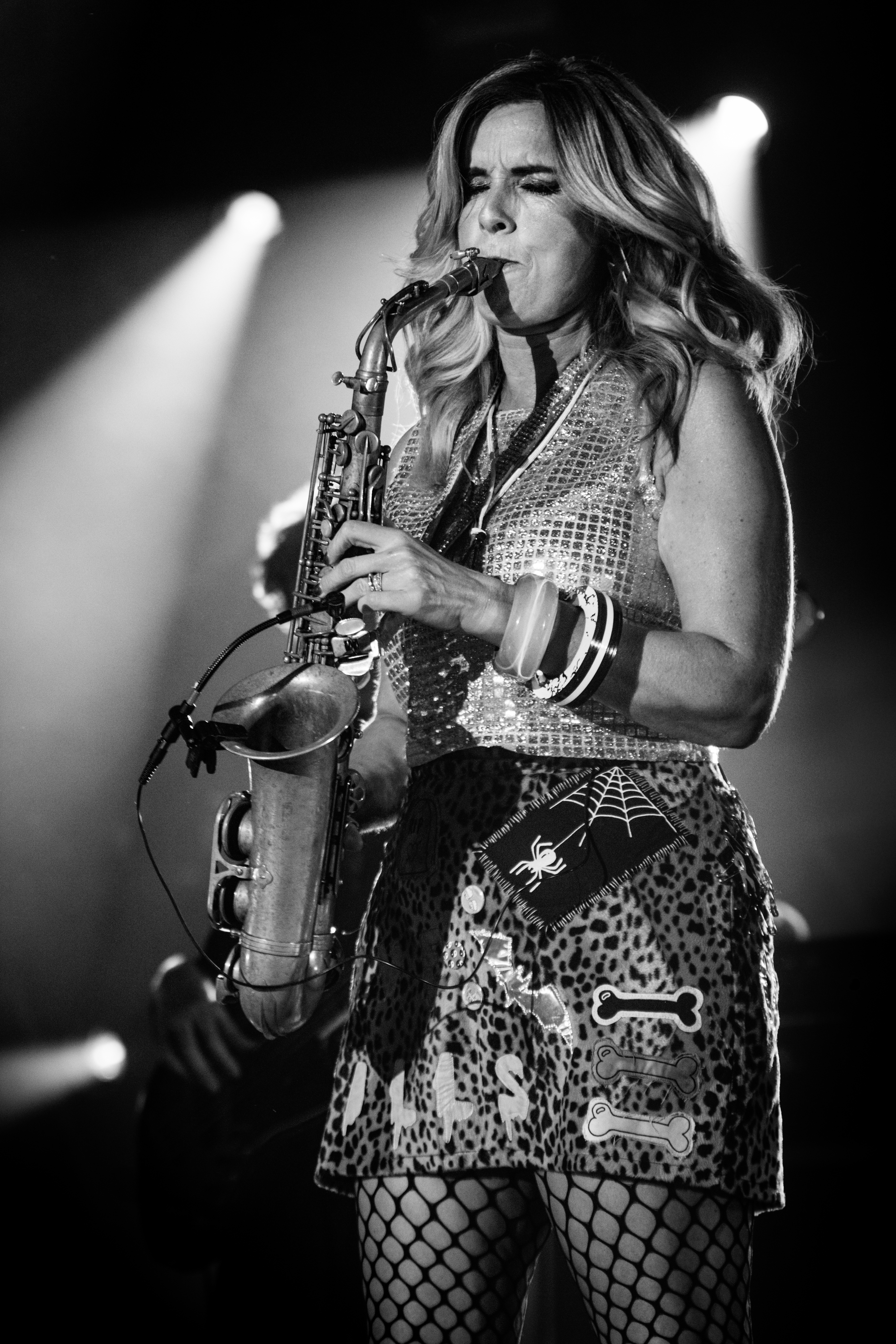
Candy Dulfer in 2016

Dulfer was born on 19 September 1969 in Amsterdam, Netherlands. She began playing the drums at the age of five. As a six-year-old, she started to play the soprano saxophone. At age seven, she switched to alto saxophone and later began playing in a local concert band Jeugd Doet Leven (English translation: "Youth Brings Life") in Zuiderwoude.

Dulfer played her first solo on stage with her father's band De Perikels ("The Perils"). At age 11, she made her first recordings for the album I Didn't Ask (1981) of De Perikels. In 1982, when she was 12 years old, she played as a member of Rosa King's Ladies Horn section at the North Sea Jazz Festival. According to Dulfer, King encouraged her to become a band leader. In 1984, at age 14, she started the band Funky Stuff.

== Career ==
=== 1980s and 1990s ===
Dulfer's band performed throughout the Netherlands and in 1987 was the opening act for two of Madonna's European concerts.

In 1988, Prince invited Dulfer on stage to play an improvised solo during one of his European shows. In 1989 Dulfer performed with Prince on SNL in NYC. In 1989 Dulfer appeared in Prince's "Partyman" video.

Dulfer performed session work with Eurythmics guitarist and producer Dave Stewart, duetting with him on the worldwide hit single "Lily Was Here" and contributing to the soundtrack of the same name. She was a guest musician for Pink Floyd during the band's performance at Knebworth in 1990, from which several tracks were released on a multi-artist live album and video, Live at Knebworth '90. The Knebworth show has since been released as part of the Pink Floyd box set The Later Years 1987–2019 on CD, DVD, and Blu-ray.

Dulfer was also the featured saxophonist on Van Morrison's A Night in San Francisco, an album in 1993, and performed with Alan Parsons and his band at the World Liberty Concert in 1995.

=== 2000 to present ===
Dulfer collaborated with her father Hans Dulfer on the duet album Dulfer Dulfer in 2001. She joined Prince's band in 2004 for his Musicology Live 2004ever tour.

In 2007, she released her ninth studio album Candy Store. The album reached a No. 2 position in Billboard's Top Contemporary Jazz charts. Her songs "Candy Store" and "L.A. Citylights" reached the No. 1 position in Smooth Jazz National Airplay charts in the United States. Also in 2007, Dulfer became the presenter and interviewer in Candy Meets..., her television program for the Dutch public broadcaster NPS. In the series, she met with Sheila E., Maceo Parker, Hans Dulfer, Van Morrison, Dave Stewart, and Mavis Staples.

Until 2010, Dulfer played a Selmer Mark VI alto saxophone, which is visible in the majority of early photographs. In 2010, she became an endorsee of the Dutch Free Wind saxophone, created by Friso Heidinga, who started building saxophones in Amsterdam in 2009.

On 13 August 2017, Dulfer was granted the honorary citizenship of the Serbian city of Niš, for continuously promoting the city through appearances in the national media in the Netherlands and throughout the world during her tour and festival performances on all continents since her first performance at since at Nisville Jazz Festival in 2009.

On 26 August 2022, Dulfer announced her new album We Never Stop, which was released on 28 October. The release was the first as a part of her record deal with Mascot Label Group. The album was preceded by the single "Jammin' Tonight", featuring Nile Rodgers.

== Discography ==
- Saxuality (1990)
- Sax-a-Go-Go (1993)
- Big Girl (1995)
- Candy Store (2007)
