= Hans Dulfer =

Dutch jazz saxophonist (born 1940)

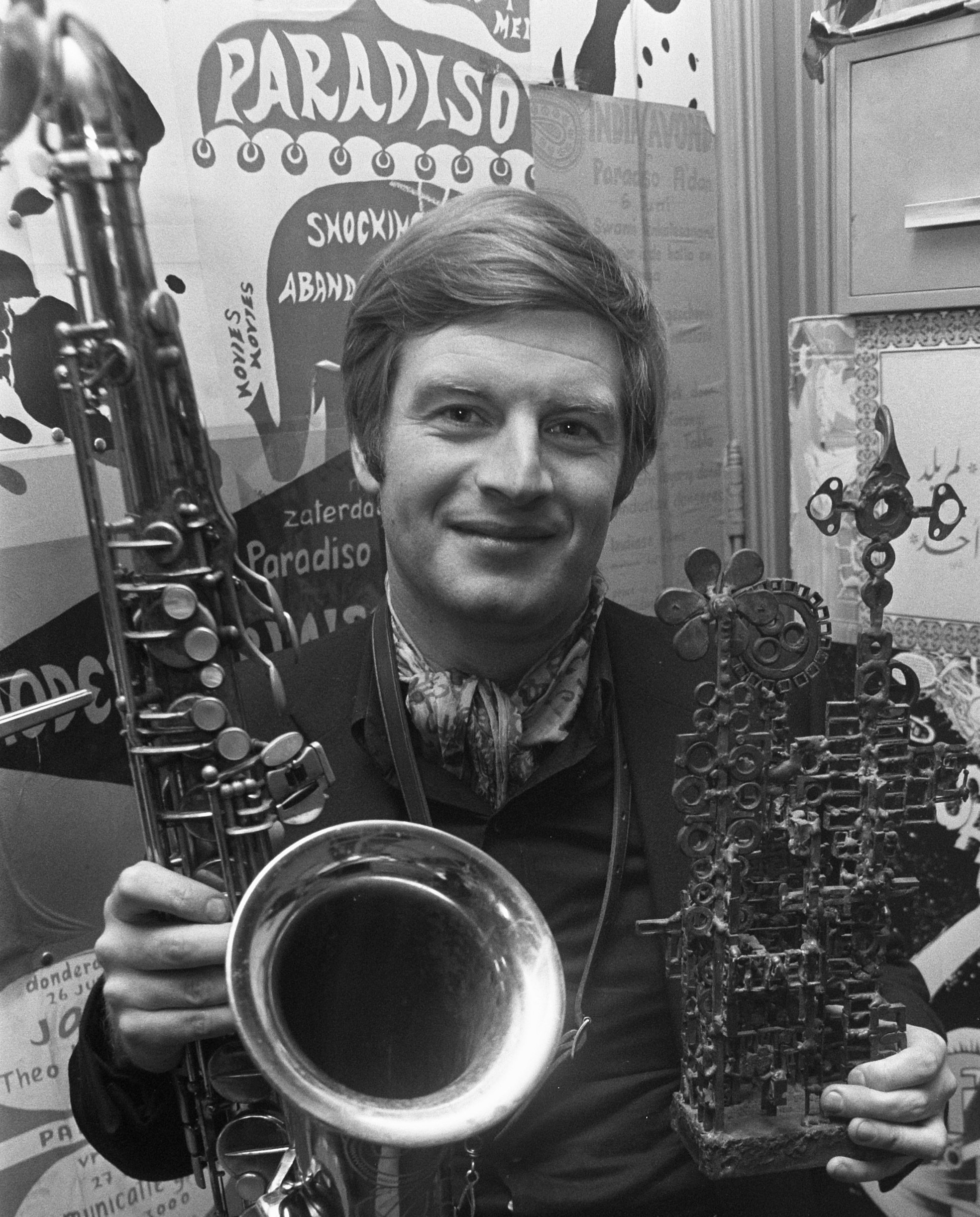
- Hans Dulfer in 1969

Background information
- Born: 28 May 1940 (age 85); Amsterdam, Netherlands
- Genres: Jazz
- Occupation: Musician
- Instrument: Tenor saxophone
- Years active: 1957–present

Hans Dulfer (born 28 May 1940) is a Dutch jazz musician who plays tenor saxophone.

== Biography ==
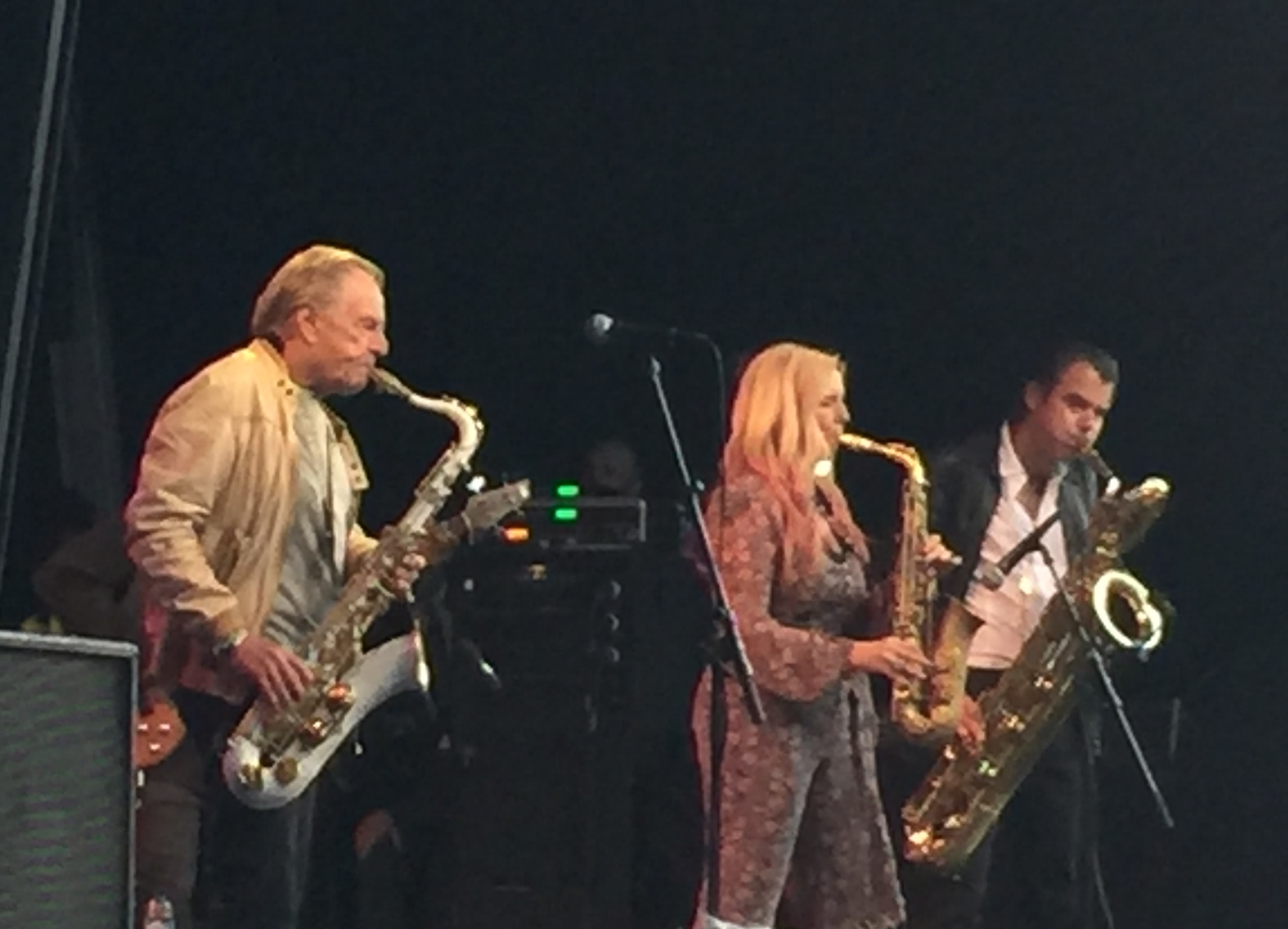
Hans Dulfer (left) and Candy Dulfer (center) in 2022

Hans Dulfer was born in 1940 in Amsterdam. His website states that he has been playing saxophone since 1957 and is self-taught. At the end of the 1960s, he and organ player Herbert Noord founded a quartet that played saxophone/organ funk. Dulfer's first album, The Morning After the Third, was issued in 1970. In 1971, Dulfer recorded an album with fellow saxophonist Frank Wright entitled "El Saxofón".

Dulfer has performed a considerable amount of crossover jazz and jazz fusion and has also worked with punk rockers. He has been referred to as "Big Boy" because of his 1994 album of the same name.

Dulfer has comparatively high popularity in Japan where Hyperbeat was a top-selling CD by instrumental standards. Japanese film maker Masaaki Yuasa stated that he listened to Dulfer's music while working on the film Mind Game.

Hans Dulfer is the father of saxophonist Candy Dulfer (born 1969). The two worked together on the 2002 album Dulfer & Dulfer.

== Discography ==
- The Morning After the Third (Catfish, 1970)
- Candy Clouds (Catfish, 1970)
- El Saxofon (Catfish, 1971)
- Maine with Roswell Rudd (BV Haast, 1977)
- I Didn't Ask (Varajazz, 1981)
- Big Boy (Monsters of Jazz, 1994)
- Express Delayed (Limetree, 1995)
- Dig! (Monsters of Jazz, 1996)
- Papa's Got a Brand New Sax (EMI, 1998)
- Skin Deep (EMI, 1998)
- El Saxofon Part II (EMI, 2000)
- Dulfer & Dulfer (Eagle, 2002)
- Scissors (JJ-Tracks, 2003)
- Duo Dulfer Directie (Zip, 2018)

=== As sideman ===
With Theo Loevendie

- Mandela (Catfish, 1970)
- Chess! (BASF 1972)
- Theo Loevendie 4tet (Universe 1974)
- Orlando (Waterland 1977)

With others

- Susanne Alt, Saxify (Venus 2016)
- Willem Breuker, Contemporary Jazz from Holland Litany for the 14th of June 1966 (Relax 1966)
- Herman Brood, Hooks (CBS, 1989)
- Claw Boys Claw, Hitkillers (Megadisc, 1988)
- Jules Deelder, De Deeldeliers (Embrace, 2012)
- Defunkt, Allergy for the U.S. (Defunkt Music 2014)
- Candy Dulfer, What Does It Take (N-Coded/Warlock/BMG, 1999)
- Candy Dulfer, Live in Amsterdam (Ariola, 2001)
- Saskia Laroo, It's Like Jazz (Laroo 1994)
- Saskia Laroo, Jazzdance (Laroo 1996)
- Lils Mackintosh, Black Girl (Quintessence, 1999)
- Masayoshi Takanaka, Guitar Wonder (Eastworld, 1996)
- Hallo Venray, The More I Laugh the Hornier Due Gets! (Van, 1992)
- Henk Westbroek, Vrij (Columbia, 1994)
