= Halina Reijn =

Dutch actress and filmmaker (born 1975)

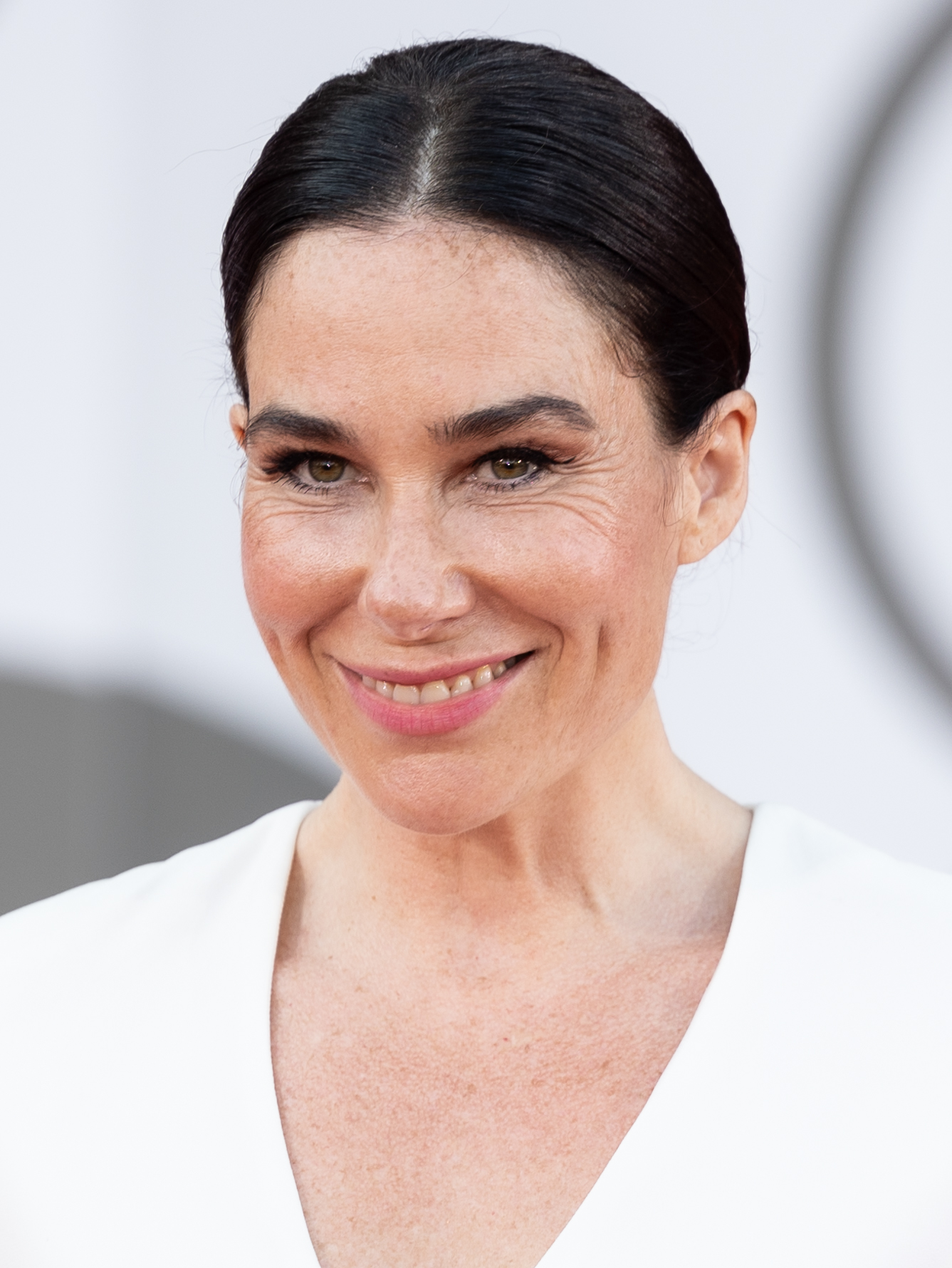
- Halina Reijn at the 81st Venice International Film Festival in 2024
- Born: 10 November 1975 (age 51); Amsterdam, Netherlands
- Education: Maastricht Academy of Dramatic Arts
- Occupations: Actress; director; writer; producer
- Years active: 1993–present
- Awards: Full list
- Website: halinareijn.nl

Halina Reijn (Dutch: [haːˈlinaː ˈrɛin]; born 10 November 1975) is a Dutch filmmaker, writer and former actress.

== Early life and education ==
Halina Reijn was born on 10 November 1975 in Amsterdam, Netherlands, to Fleur ten Kate and Frank Volkert Reijn. Reijn's parents were both artists. She is the middle child of three daughters, with an older sister named Leonora and a younger named Esther. Her father was gay despite being in a heterosexual marriage with her mother. Reijn grew up in an anthroposophy household, and her parents were followers of the Subud spiritual movement. In her early years, she grew up with her family in the tiny village of Wildervank, Groningen located in the north of the Netherlands. The place attracted many artists, Reijn described it as a "pleasant community". They lived without television and never visited the cinema. Instead they played music, drew and painted. Her father built a theater room with a podium and flats for her.

Reijn developed an interest in acting when her babysitter took her to a showing of Annie, a film adaptation of the Broadway musical, at a local theater when she was six. She stated, "When I saw Annie, I thought, I want that too. I was very jealous of her." With help of her mother, she joined a youth theater in Veendam. Reijn found it inadequate and thought the other children did not take it seriously enough, which led her mother to pursue an audition with the theater collective De Voorziening (precursor to the Noord Nederlands Toneel) despite being only ten years old.

When she was ten years old, and a year after her parents had amicably separated, her father died suddenly from suffocation caused by an undiagnosed pulmonary embolism. Following her father's death, Reijn and her remaining immediate family stayed "very close" and they moved to a newly built neighborhood of Groningen in order to escape the isolation. Reijn was able to continue her theater lessons, and her mother, like a "soccer mom", would bring her everywhere to auditions; Reijn had strong desire to become a child star. From age eleven onwards, under the tutelage of Josja Hamann, she attended the Vooropleiding Theater in Groningen, a selective youth academy where they were giving lessons and had to rehearse every midday. She stayed eight years at the academy. She also attended a VWO school in Groningen. Upon receiving her diploma, she applied at theater schools in Maastricht, Arnhem, and Amsterdam, with the Sonia Moore Studio of the Theatre in New York as a back-up. With the latter, she had spent a year in New York and passed an audition. She ultimately chose the Maastricht Academy of Dramatic Arts.

== Career ==
=== 1994–1999: Early television and theater work ===
Throughout her teenage years, she had her earliest acting gigs in various minor roles on the small screen, and a bigger role in Pril geluk, a thirteen-part comedy series on the Veronica channel, that ran for a single season. The latter one was meant as a foundation for her entrance exam into theatre school. Reijn was professionally trained at the Maastricht Academy of Dramatic Arts, where she graduated in 1998. In the middle of her second year in Maastricht, two years before her final exams, she was allowed to leave with an honorable mention. She was asked to join the ensemble at the De Trust where she was offered the role of Ophelia in Hamlet, Subsequently, Theu Boermans, the artistic director, offered her a permanent place at the collective. Among her other performances for De Trust, her portrayal of Lulu in Shopping and Fucking was awarded the prestigious Dutch theater prize, the Colombina, for "Best Supporting Actress" in 1998. She also had parts in The Cherry Orchard, The Last Ones, Jeff Koons and Adel Blank; the latter was a co-production with De Mexicaanse Hond.

She also appeared in a short called Temper! Temper! written and directed by Frank Lammers, which was part of Kort Rotterdams, a five-part series highlighting common elements of Rotterdam's society. In 1998, Reijn branched out into film, with the adaptation of the Jan Wolkers's short story De wet op het kleinbedrijf, where she had a principal role in the television film. The following year she starred in her first telefilm, an initiative started by the NPO in 1998 to produce films for public television: De Trein van zes uur tien, a Dutch thriller directed by Frank Ketelaar that was broadcast by AVRO. It was part of the 2000s Cologne Conference, where it was selected among the ten programmes at the TopTen section of the festival. That same year she played a bit part as a sex worker in Martin Koolhoven's breakout film, Suzy Q, which featured Reijn's lifelong friend Carice van Houten in the title role. Despite its warm critical reception and launching the careers of the people involved, the movie was never released on home video, in theaters or shown outside its home country due to music license issues.

=== 2000–2003: Toneelgroep Amsterdam and first film roles ===
Reijn made her big screen acting debut in De Omweg (also known as "The Detour"), a semi-autobiographical drama directed and written by Frouke Fokkema. It opened in Dutch theaters on November 7, 2000, to little fanfare. On January 1, 2001, 3 years after Reijn joined, De Trust would fuse with another theater company named Art & Pro, they would continue under the new name of de Theatercompagnie. Further that year, she would star in Nanouk Leopold's directorial debut, tragicomedy Îles flottantes, it follows the dysfunctional lives of three friends who all recently turned thirty. The low budget film was part of No More Heroes, an initiative started in order to produce films from upcoming Dutch filmmakers. The film was selected for and first premiered at the 2001's International Film Festival Rotterdam, where it was nominated for the Tiger Award. Between her two film releases in 2001, she also participated in De acteurs, a seven part weekly series where fourteen young actors were interviewed and paired up with each other to rehearse scenes from a miniseries created by Kim van Kooten. That same year, Reijn gained further notoriety with her role in the tragicomedy, Zus & Zo, alongside De Trust peers, which was written and directed by Paula van der Oest. The movie revolves around three sisters trying to stop their gay brother from marrying a woman and in doing so securing the family's seaside estate for his own. Reijn played the unsuspecting fiancée. The movie premiered at the 2001 Toronto International Film Festival, just before the September 11 attacks. The movie was nominated for Academy Award for Best International Feature Film at the 75th Academy Awards, despite mixed reviews. She also starred in her second short, Flicka, as the title role, in which she played a computer programme who is in relationship with a lonely building supervisor, it was produced as part of NTR Kort!. And lastly she appeared in the VARA TV Movie Herschreven vriendschap.

In 2002, Reijn featured in four projects. First she played a minor part in Frank Van Passel's Villa des Roses, her first role in an English/French language international co-production, based on the novel of the same name by Willem Elsschot. Her next two projects were on television with the short TV drama De afrekening and the TV Movie Ware Liefde. She also had a minor role in Moonlight, Paula van der Oest's follow-up movie. Meanwhile, back on stage she performed her first role for Toneelgroep Amsterdam, with Ivo van Hove as director. She took on the role of the courtesan Poppea in Con Amore. At the time, she was still connected with De Trust, but she got 'loaned out' to TGA. For De Theatercompagnie she returned to the role of Ophelia in Hamlet, a character she played previously, for a new rendition of the Shakespearean classic.

In 2003, she joined the ensemble at Toneelgroep Amsterdam (TGA), under the direction of future long-time collaborator Ivo van Hove. Around that time she also completed her final performance for De Theatercompagnie, with a new production of The Seagull, where she played Nina. In her first year, with the Toneelgroep Amsterdam, she starred in two plays: She played Irina in the Three Sisters, based upon the play of Anton Chekhov of the same name, and Eugene O'Neill's Mourning Becomes Electra, a co-production with the Toneelschuur, for the latter performance, in which she played Lavinia, she was nominated for a Theo d'Or for "Best Female Actress" in 2004. On television she appeared in two telefilms, she played Ewouds's girlfriend in Boy Ecury and Hostess Patty in Het wonder van Máxima, they were aired on public television on 2 and 9 April respectively.

Reijn had three big screen releases in 2003. Her first appearance was as Polleke's mother, Tina, in the family film Polleke, a film adaption of Guus Kuijer's children's book. At first, she was bewildered why she approached by director Ineke Houtman for the role of Polleke's mother, at the time she viewed herself too young to play a mother, but later accepted the role when delving into the character's story. It was the opening film of the Cinekid festival on October 11. Her next feature film was with director-writer Alex van Warmerdam, called Grimm, in which she had the female leading role. The story is loosely based on Grimm Brothers's Brother and Sister, in which a brother and sister are abandoned by their father in a forest; in a note their mother urges them to go to Spain to meet up with their uncle. The movie was first shown at SSIF, before released nationwide in the Dutch theaters in early December. Compared to the directors earlier work, Grimm was a critical and financial disappointment. Dissatisfied with the original cut, director Alex van Warmerdam together with editor Job ter Burg went back to the original and reworked the entire film. The new cut premiered at 2019's Netherlands Film Festival.

Reijn then starred in Maarten Treurniet's directorial debut Father's Affair, where she played Ellen, the girlfriend of Peter Paul Muller's character and best friend of his deceased wife, who is notified by his GP that he is infertile, which leads to a desperate search for the biological father of his fourteen-year-old son. For her performance as Ellen, Reijn was nominated for best actress at the Golden Calves. In March 2004, both Polleke and Father's Affair, were awarded the Golden Film by the Netherlands Film Festival for having sold 100,000 tickets at the box office.

=== 2004–2009: Black Book, La Voix humaine and brief hiatus from acting ===
Compared to her previous years, 2004 was a year of rediscovery and recuperation for Reijn. During a production of Mourning Becomes Electra she approached and told Ivo van Hove: "Take me out of everything, remove me from all your plans, because I can't handle it anymore". She started to resent her work and needed a time-out from her work, friends and home. She was granted unpaid leave by Toneelgroep Amsterdam. In April of that year, on invitation of Renée Missel, who she met at the Oscars that spring, she travelled to Los Angeles. While staying in Los Feliz, and with a scholarship of the VandenEnde Foundation and Fonds Podiumkunsten, she attended an actors and directors lab under the guidance of Judith Weston. The following year, she returned to the stage with Shakespeare's The Taming of the Shrew, where she played the title character. The new interpretation of the play received glowing reviews, Reijn in particular got acclaim for her part as Katherina. Reijn also took part in Masterclass, a hidden camera fake documentary-style television film written and directed Hans Teeuwen. It follows Pierre Bokma playing as himself giving a master class together with his reclusive former mentor Peer Mascini to six theatre students. In the film, Reijn is one of the actors interviewed about their previous experiences with Mancini, the actors involved, however, aren't made aware that they are secretly being recorded. Also in 2005, she starred in Erik de Bruyn's poetry short Lentelied, based upon the poem Frühlingslied by J. C. van Schagen.

In 2006, she starred in A Thousand Kisses, directed by Willem van de Sande Bakhuyzen, the final film before his death. It was released on 9 March in Dutch theaters. That same week, Huis van de toekomst (House of the Future) had its premiere at the Compagnietheater, Amsterdam. The multimedia play, written and directed by Carina Molier, stars a group of actors living in Big Brother-style house playing fictionalized versions of intellectuals, who Molier had previously interviewed, engaging in a science experiment. The piece also included video that was recorded prior and the actors could be viewed from every angle by the audience, who were also accompanied by a camera crew. Reijn played a media expert named Anna Tabaknikova that was based on Maja Kuzmanovic. She next played as the central character in Hedda Gabler. In contrast with other portrayals, Reijn approached the character in a more messy, unkept way who is more direct and frank in her dealings with others. While her performance received praise, the play itself was viewed less favourably.

Reijn then starred in Black Book, a World War II drama-thriller co-written and directed by Paul Verhoeven and co-starring Carice van Houten and Sebastian Koch. Set in Nazi occupied Netherlands, the film featured her as Ronnie, an opportunist who prioritizes her own luxury and survival during the war in contrast with Rachel Steinn (van Houten), a Jewish woman on the run, who gets involved with the Dutch resistance. She originally auditioned for the lead role, but was passed over in favour of van Houten and was given the part of Ronnie instead; Verhoeven found her appearance a better match for the latter character, they wanted a softer less pronounced look for the protagonist. The international co-production, with a total production cost of 21 million dollars, is the most expensive Dutch film ever made. The movie had its world premiere at the 63rd Venice Film Festival, where it was nominated for the Golden Lion. It was the 2007's Dutch entry for the Academy Awards as Best Foreign Language Film, but was not selected. For her performance, she was nominated for her second Golden Calf and a Rembrandt Award. She would return to the stage with Oresteia, where she portrayed the character of Elektra under the direction of Johan Simons. Oresteia was collaboration between TGA and the Belgian theatre company NTGent. She would also provide her voice for the short Voor een paar knikkers meer, which became a festival darling that was shown at 200 festivals.

Following a three-year absence of the play, she would reprise her role in Mourning Becomes Electra for a new season in the first half of 2007. Also that spring, at the 57th Berlin International Film Festival, Reijn was one of the actors selected by the European Film Promotion for the annual Shooting Stars Award. Her next film role was in Tamar van den Dop's first feature film, Blind. In the film she played a withdrawn albino woman, whose face is so fully scarred and who has severe insecurities about her appearance that one day she gets hired to read for a recently blind man. The role was noted to be a departure for Reijn, at the time she was primarily known for portraying extroverted characters. In the autumn on the stage, she had a supporting role as Tecmessa in Ajax, together with actors from the Theatercompagnie. It ran until December 2007. She also took on the role of Nadine, in the road film drama of the same name, directed by Erik de Bruyn. The role of Nadine is depicted by three different actors across three stages of the character's life with Reijn appearing in flashbacks as the youngest one who is an ambitious party animal. The movie received only a limited release, and was received mostly positive by critics who praised the acting but criticised the poor script. On television she starred in the two-part mini-series biographical drama, De Prins en het Meisje, that loosely depicts the controversial engagement and its fallout between Mabel Wisse Smit and the late Prince Friso, portrayed respectively by Reijn and Fedja van Huêt. It was first screened at the Netherlands Film Festival, where the two leads won the Golden Calf Special Jury Prize, before it was broadcast on Nederland 2.

In May 2008, Reijn returned to Hollywood for the second time in order to develop her screenplay of her novel, Prinsesje Nooitgenoeg, into a feature film with the intention of directing the project herself. Upon her return to Europe, she went back to stage with an adaptation of Luchino Visconti's Rocco and His Brothers which had its premiere in German at the Ruhrtriennale festival before coming to Amsterdam following May. In the play she takes on the part of sex worker Nadia, who finds herself caught in a rivalry between the brothers Rocco and Simone. Even though Nadia only appears sporadically, she loved playing this type of character which she described as "part strong woman, part almost animalistic". In October, TGA started a new season of The Taming of the Shrew that ran until December. She had supporting role as Margarethe von Oven alongside her Black Book co-star Carice van Houten, in the Tom Cruise vehicle Valkyrie. Both were separately asked to join the cast, after Cruise and Bryan Singer had watched Black Book. The film marks Reijn's first and only acting role in a major Hollywood production. The movie about the 20 July plot received mixed-to-positive reviews from critics and was a box office success. In the wake of Valkyrie's release, she was offered numerous film roles but decided to stick to theater and forgo Hollywood at the time.

Reijn started off 2009 with her first monodrama, Jean Cocteau's La voix humaine. The project was developed for Antwerp-based Arts centre Monty, who asked van Hove to produce a small-scale production for their "Le salon des exilés" exhibition, which was created to challenge its participants to create a scaled-down play. At first, Reijn was apprehensive about the role citing poor experiences with solo plays at school, as a solution she became directly involved co-translating the original text. Furthermore, she had adjust her usual intense acting style to be more subdued. It had two additional appearances at the New Island Festival and Polish theatre festival KONTAKT, at the latter she won the Best Actress award. Before bringing it back for the following season with its Dutch premiere in October of that same year. Reijn earned widespread acclaim for her performance. Mick Heaney of the Irish Times described Reijn's acting as "whose performance is remarkable in any language". The drama proved to be a major success, over the course of eleven years, she would perform it 183 times across the world, up until her retirement from acting in December 2019. A month later, Cries and Whispers, an adaptation of Ingmar Bergman's film of the same name, had its debut in Antwerp and a Dutch tour right after. It was also performed at the Next Wave Festival in 2011. In it Reijn starred as the younger sister Maria. The overall reception to it was mostly positive, although it was generally considered inferior to the original film. Her next project was the Antonioni Project, an adaption that combines the three films, L’Avventura, La Notte and L'Eclisse, of Michelangelo Antonioni into a single script.

=== 2010–2012: Established actress and the Theo d'Or ===
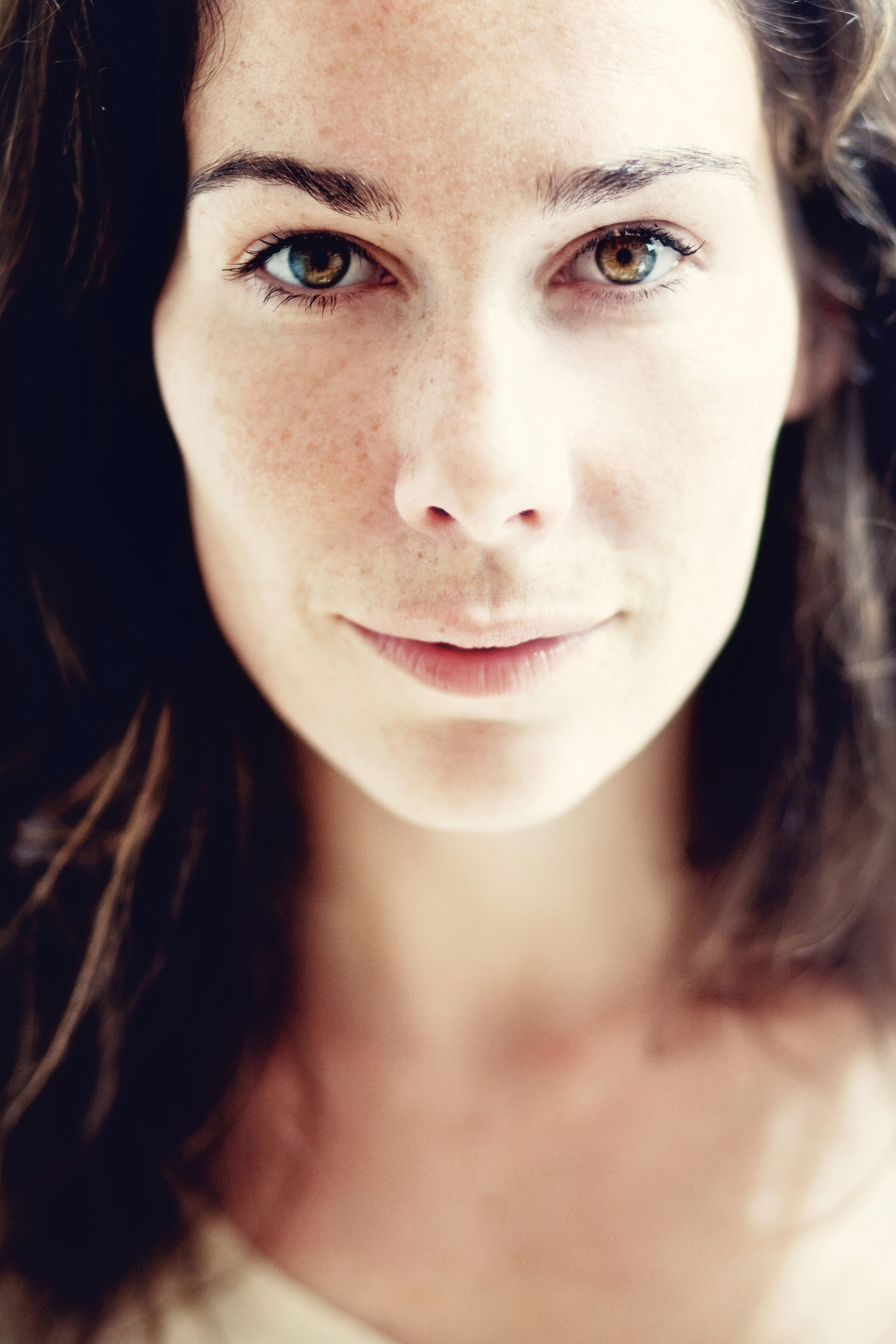
Halina Reijn in 2010

With the start of the decade, she returned to the silver screen with Win/Win, a telefilm about the 2008 financial crisis that takes place in Amsterdam Zuidas. Reijn gravitated to the script due to it engagement with current events, and joined the cast despite the fact that her role as receptionist Deniz, described as a "cold formal type", was only secondary. The film has had its debut at IFFR and was later shown in Dutch theaters in April. She would also come back to television with the first season of In therapie alongside van Houten, the Dutch version of the Israelian BeTipul, In the show she plays Lara, a doctor, who falls for her therapist. She also starred in the music short film Great Lengths featuring music from Martyn. After a four-year hiatus she reprised her leading role in Hedda Gabler, and would return for another season in the second half of 2011, followed-up by a final show at the Munich Kammerspiele in July 2012. Alongside other famous Dutch actors, she had a cameo appearance in Sterke verhalen.

Reijn provided her voice for another short film, titled Sintel. The English-language animated short was made in Blender in collaboration with the Blender Foundation. The 15 minute long short revolves around a girl named Sintel, voiced by Reijn, and her pet dragon that is voiced by Thom Hoffman. With a budget of four thousand euros, the short was the second-most expensive Dutch animated film at the time and had its debut at the Netherlands Film Festival, before it was released online for free. It was viewed over a million times in less than a week. Her final film role of the year was in The Dinner Club, directed by Robert Jan Westdijk. The movie revolves around an eating club set in the affluent neighbourhood of het Gooi. Reijn was considered one of the few highlights, in a movie that was mostly panned. On stage, she was part of another co-production between TGA and NTGent, in a reworking of Maxim Gorky's Children of the Sun where she portrayed Lisa, the sister of the main character. It earned significant acclaim from critics, with particular mentions towards the cast. Volkskrant's Karin Veraart called Reijn performance as the neurotic sister Lisa "fantastic". The original season ran until February 2011, with a follow-up season in early 2013.

In 2011, she was part of the ensemble cast for De Russen! (The Russians), an adaptation written by Tom Lanoye that rewrites Anton Chekhov's Platonov and Ivanov into a five hour long tragicomedy set in the modern day, that involved the entire emsemble of the company. On television she starred in the episode called "Kortsluiting" of the crime drama anthology series, Van God Los, which were inspired by real events. Her single film release in 2011, was in the psychological thriller Isabelle as the titular character, a famous and beautiful actress who is abducted and held captive by a disfigured artist. In preparation for the role, Reijn lost nine kilos (18lbs) by sticking to strict diet for nine weeks. While filming, she struggled with keeping herself warm during the nude scenes and described the overall experience as intense. The film based on the eponymous novel received mixed-to-negative reviews from critics, and although her effort was commended she was largely viewed as a miscast. Despite this, Reijn was nominated for best Dutch actress for the role at the 2012's Rembrandt Awards.

Reijn began 2012 with a supporting role in the television film, De Overloper, that bridges the fifth and sixth season of the police drama Flikken Maastricht. In it she plays the temporary detective partner of Angela Schijf's character. The premiere was watched by 1.6 million people, making it as of 2015 the most watched Telefilm. Subsequently, she starred in a stage adaptation of John Cassavetes' Husbands, in it she took on the role of every female character in the play with seven roles in total. The project was created in partnership with the European Union under the Prospero initiative, that made its debut in Rennes and would being played across seven European cities in 2012. It gained a mixed reception with Dutch critics. Reijn's performance was noted as one of the high points. Husbands was the subject of a NPO Doc documentary, Bloot - een film over acteren, where their rehearsals were recorded and the cast was interviewed about their profession. For the Netherlands Film Festival, Reijn was one of a handful actors involved in a thriller short which was based on suggestions and feedback from Twitter users with only the basic premise prewritten. Following a years long hiatus, she returned as Katharina for the last season of "The Taming of the Shrew", Coinciding with it, Reijn was tasked with guiding eight girls with criminal backgrounds, who wanted to clean up their acts by auditioning for a rock musical version of the aforementioned "The Taming of the Shrew" in a television special that was part of a television program called, TV Lab, that was broadcast on NPO 3.

Reijn appeared in the ensemble cast of 2012's Goltzius & The Pelican Company, written and directed by Peter Greenaway. In the film about the Dutch printmaker Hendrick Goltzius, she portrayed Portia. She next played the titular character in a restaging of Henrik Ibsen's Nora with director Thibaud Delpeut. This would mark her having played both Ibsen's most well known heroines, Nora and Hedda Gabler. Reijn initially wished to direct the play herself with Karina Smulders in the lead, directing her own play was long held dream for her but she backed down and when Delpeut wanted to direct it she was cast as Nora. In the beginning, she was hesitant to take on the project, nevertheless she accepted due her desire to work with Delpeut. The play proved divisive among critics and audiences, although Reijn's performance received universal acclaim. Simon van den Berg of the Parool called her performance as Nora, "one of her most beautiful and intense roles so far". She was awarded a Theo d'Or by VSCD for her portrayal of Nora.

=== 2013–2018: Continued theater work and final film roles ===
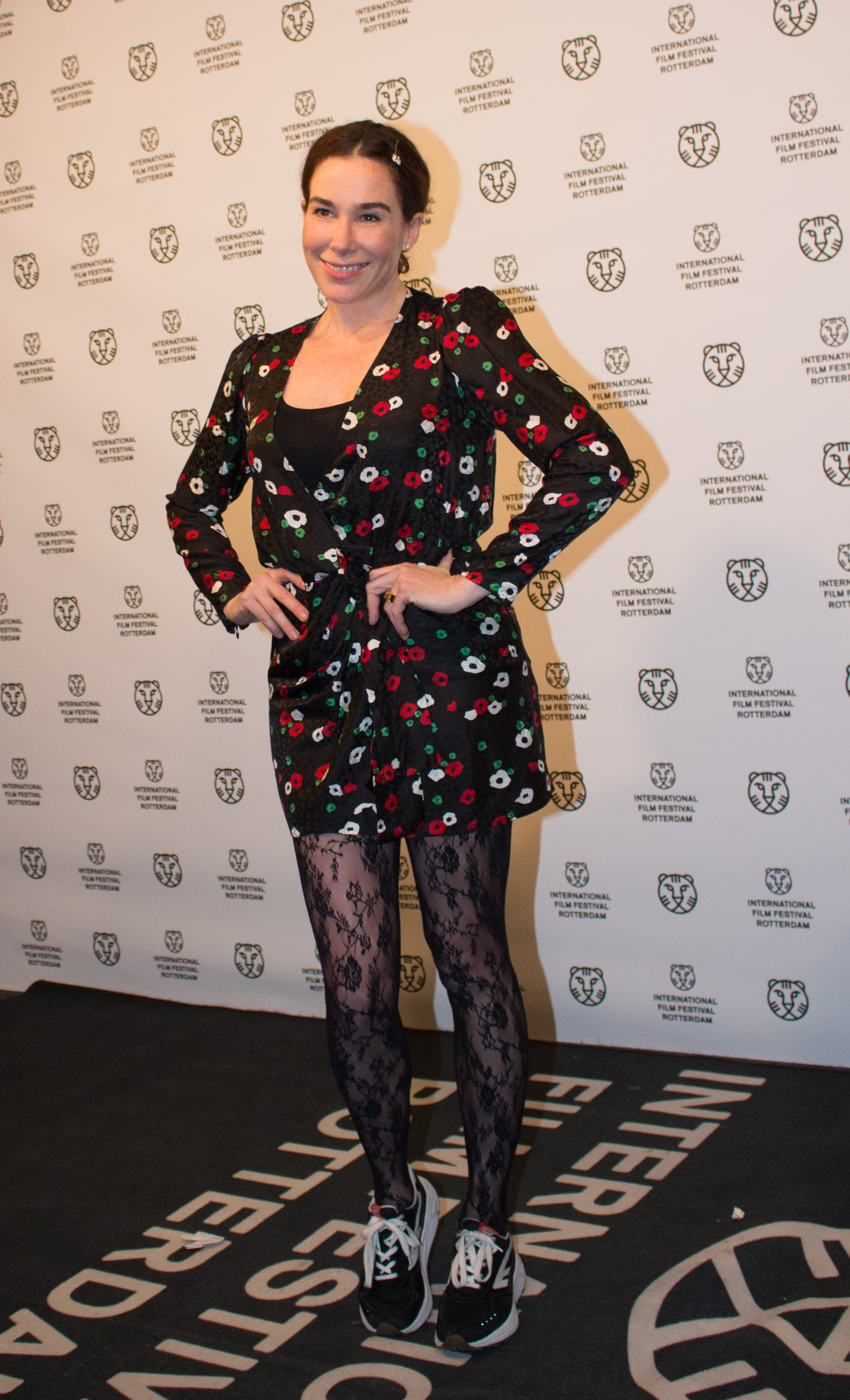
Halina Reijn at the International Film Festival Rotterdam 2020

In 2013, she was bestowed with the Courbois-pearl by the namesake of the award, Kitty Courbois, at the Toneelgroep Amsterdam 25th anniversary event. The award was created in 2010 by Toneelgroep Amsterdam and Stadsschouwburg in order to honor the careers of actresses who have made an indelible impression on the public on theater, and in the world television and film with Courbois being the inaugural recipient. Unlike other awards, The pearl can only given by the previous recipient to another actress. She then starred as the title character in the ten-part television series Charlie, the Dutch remake of the medical comedy-drama Nurse Jackie. In the show, she played a married ER nurse who leads a double life who struggles with a drug addiction and commits adultery. After reading the scripts she quickely signed on, relishing the opportunity to play a different, more cynical character. On the ten-year anniversary, she came back as Lavinia in Mourning Becomes Electra for the 2013/2014 theater season. Over the years, they staged it over 100 times with at least 35.000 visitors worldwide. She also had a minor part in the Feuten: Het Feestje, a stand-alone sequel film to the Feuten television series.

Reijn portrayed four characters, three women and one man, St. Just, Julie, Lucile and Marion, in a radical restaging of Georg Büchner's Danton's Death, directed by Johan Simons. Its first night was on 9 February 2014, and ran until April. Set during the French Revolution, the story follows the conflict between French revolutionaries Georges Danton and Robespierre. In collaboration with theatre director Adelheid Roosen and De oversteek project, this new version incorporated hundred of local regular folks in their own clothing that are inserted in select scenes. This version of the famous play, was met a polarizing response. Loek Zonneveld writing for De Groene, noted Reijn's acting as the three women a "strong one-woman choir commentator", but adding, St. Just, Robespierre alter ego, a "strange directerial choice" that "doesn't hold up". On television, she was a guest star on the comedy show Jeuk. In the summer she was in back in theatres with an adaptation of The Fountainhead with her taking on the role of Dominique Francon. It earned a mostly positive reaction from European critics. In his positive review for The Guardian, Andrew Todd proclaimed Reijn as a "superb Francon" who is the "beating heart of the story". It was staged across Europe in Amsterdam, Festival d'Avignon, Festival Grec de Barcelona among others. The play would be restaged intermittently every year until 2019, including appearances in Paris, Seoul, Taiwan, New York City, and Manchester.

Further in 2014, she was in the box office hit Gift from the Heart, a romantic comedy for the holiday season set around Sinterklaas. The movie was awarded a Platinum Film. The story revolves around Julia (Chantal Janzen), a marketer send to the Netherlands to create a marketing campaign around Santa Claus during Sinterklaas, where she comes in contact with two brothers (Benja Bruijning and Fedja van Huêt). In it she plays the estranged partner of van Huêt's character. Critics expressed their disapproval with the film, calling it a poor replica of Love Actually and Love Is All. De Telegraaf criticized the lack of chemistry between the leads. In the winter of 2014/2015, she starred in Maria Stuart as the titular character opposite of Chris Nietvelt as Elizabeth I. A historical drama written by Friedrich Schiller that chronicles the final days of Mary, Queen of Scots. The play was coproduced with Toneelhuis Antwerp, it received a mixed response from Dutch-language critics, and a more favorable reception from French commentators at the Exit Festival. For her performance she nominated for her third Theo d'Or.

Reijn had a supporting role in Boy 7, a film adaptation based on the eponymous dystopian science fiction young adult novel of Mirjam Mous. Set in a future police state in the Netherlands, she played one of three teachers at a re-education institute. The film was released in February 2015. She also provided her voice for Nature Is Speaking, an environmental awareness campaign created by Conservation International. It was shown in Dutch theaters as a trailer beginning 26 March. That same year, Reijn returned to the small screen for a television series and film. Firstly, she played a major part in the romantic comedy, Bagels & Bubbels, a Dutch remake of Beauty and the Baker. She portrayed the fiancé of the male lead, Rick, a baker who falls in love with an international superstar. It was cancelled after one season, as it was unable to overcome mediocre audience ratings. Secondly, she starred in De leerling, a mid-length drama film that explores the attraction and complicated relationship between a 40-year old teacher and her new student at a VMBO school. It was part of the One Night Stand series.

Reijn closed out the year of 2015 on stage with an adaptation of Louis Couperus's famous novel, The Hidden Force. Set on Java in the backdrop of Dutch East Indies, the narrative explores cultural differences and clashes between Dutch colonizers and the indigenous indonesians. Reijn's role in the play was as Leonie van Oudijck, who she described as a femme fatale. She followed in the footsteps of Pleuni Touw, who played the character in the De Stille Kracht mini-series, which was noted for having the first nude scene on Dutch television. It was met a moderately positive response from Dutch reviewers on its opening at Ruhrtriennale, who praised the special effects but on the opposite side, the writing and some of the acting received criticism. After Ruhrtriennale, it was restaged at the Stadsschouwburg and DeSingel until February 2016. Besides an appearance at the Chekhov Festival in 2017, the play returned at the end of both 2017 and 2018. On 1 December 2015, Reijn and Carice van Houten established their own production company and publisher named Man Up. Reijn already made known previously, the duo's ambitions to collaborate more and move into producing their own projects. Reijn was slated to appear in Marleen Jonkman's directorial debut, La Holandesa, as a childless woman trying to get her life together, but was replaced by Rifka Lodeizen as she had to drop out for other obligations.

In the summer of 2016, Reijn and TGA debut a faithful reworking of Woody Allen's Husbands and Wives at the Holland Festival, directed by Simon Stone. In it she took on the role of Judy, played by Mia Farrow in the film. It was met with significant acclaim from critics. Reijn's Judy earned her considerable praise. They would go on tour with Husbands and Wives starting in September up to March 2017. In the winter of 2016/2017, she could be seen in the musical film De Zevende Hemel, It was released in theaters to a mixed critical reception. On stage in the play Obsession next to Jude Law, this play was a coproduction between Toneelgroep Amsterdam and the Barbican Centre London and was performed in English. Although the play quickly sold out, it was unable to meet the high expections and was greeted with a lukewarm response. In the fall, she had a supporting role in the romantic drama film Love Revisited. In 2018, she guest starred in two television shows. She was one of the Dutch celebrities that played as herself in Linda de Mol's comedy series Family Kruys. She also starred in the Swedish thriller Conspiracy of Silence, an eight part series about the international arms trade. In it she played as Maggie van Haal, a CEO of a Swedish-Belgian weapons factory. She described the experience of filming as making her feel like a "freshman", as every scene was in Swedish except hers, and the rest of the cast already knew each other and didn't who she was. Although she enjoyed the adventure, she stated at the time that her work with Internationaal Theater Amsterdam and her burgeoning directorial career would take priority.

=== 2019–present: Transition to filmmaker ===
2019 marked the year Reijn moved into filmmaking and officially announced her retirement (Note: Reijn returned for a single performance of The Hidden Force over a livestream during the COVID-19 pandemic on November 27, 2020.) from acting with Red Light being her last official project. Reijn made her directorial debut with the 2019's Instinct, with Carice van Houten and Marwan Kenzari in leading roles. It was the first film produced through her production company Man Up. Development of the film started in 2015, Reijn co-wrote the script with Esther Gerritsen, they did extensive research for the project. It was made on a modest budget and filming took place in May 2018. The film premiered at the Locarno Film Festival, winning the Variety Piazza Grande Award and received a special mention for best first feature. It also premiered at the Toronto International Film Festival, BFI London Film Festival, and Les Arcs Film Festival, and was selected as the Dutch entry for the 92nd Academy Awards for Best International Feature. It received generally positive reviews from critics and was awarded a Golden Film for having sold 100.000 tickets.

2020 saw the release of Red Light, a Belgian-Dutch television series starring Reijn that follows three women who become entangled in matters of human trafficking after one of their husbands goes missing. Reijn co-created the series alongside Carice van Houten, writing and producing the show through her and van Houten's production company, Man Up. The series won the Dutch Golden Calf award for Best TV Show and Best Actress at the Dutch Film Festival, and had its premiere at the Cannes Series festival where it won the Canneseries Student Prize and Special Interpretation Prize. Van Houten left Man Up in 2023 to start her own production company, Birdcat, leaving Reijn the sole principal of Man Up.

Reijn's English-language directorial debut, Bodies Bodies Bodies, was released in 2022. It premiered at SXSW in March 2022 and had its U.S. theatrical release in August, where it had the second-highest-grossing opening weekend of any limited-release film that year. It was met a positive critical reception and achieved solid success at the box office. The film was nominated for two Independent Spirit Awards in 2022, for best director and best screenplay. Shortly after the release of Bodies Bodies Bodies, A24, the film's distributor, also acquired the North American rights for Reijn's debut feature Instinct.

Reijn next wrote, produced, and directed the erotic thriller, Babygirl, with Nicole Kidman in the lead role; it follows Kidman as a CEO who starts an affair with a young intern, played by Harris Dickinson. The film, which marks her second direct collaboration with A24, began filming in December 2023. The film premiered at the 81st Venice International Film Festival, while it competed for the prestigious Golden Lion. It was released by A24 in the United States on December 25, 2024.

In 2025, she was involved as the director and photographer for Sarah Burton's debut collection at the Givenchy fashion house. The campaign starred model and actress Kaia Gerber, the subject of the campaign was the female gaze, female collaboration, and was meant to explore the friendship between the director and actress. Reijn also appeared together with Gerber in some of the photographs and videos. She also co-wrote and co-directed a commercial short film with Spike Jonze for fashion house Gucci. Following year, it was reported that Reijn was working on her fourth feature film and third with A24 and David Hinojosa. The film, named Please, is a romantic period-drama that will star Gracie Abrams in her acting debut. It is meant as a continuation of the "edgy romance genre" Reijn explored previously in Babygirl.

== Other works ==
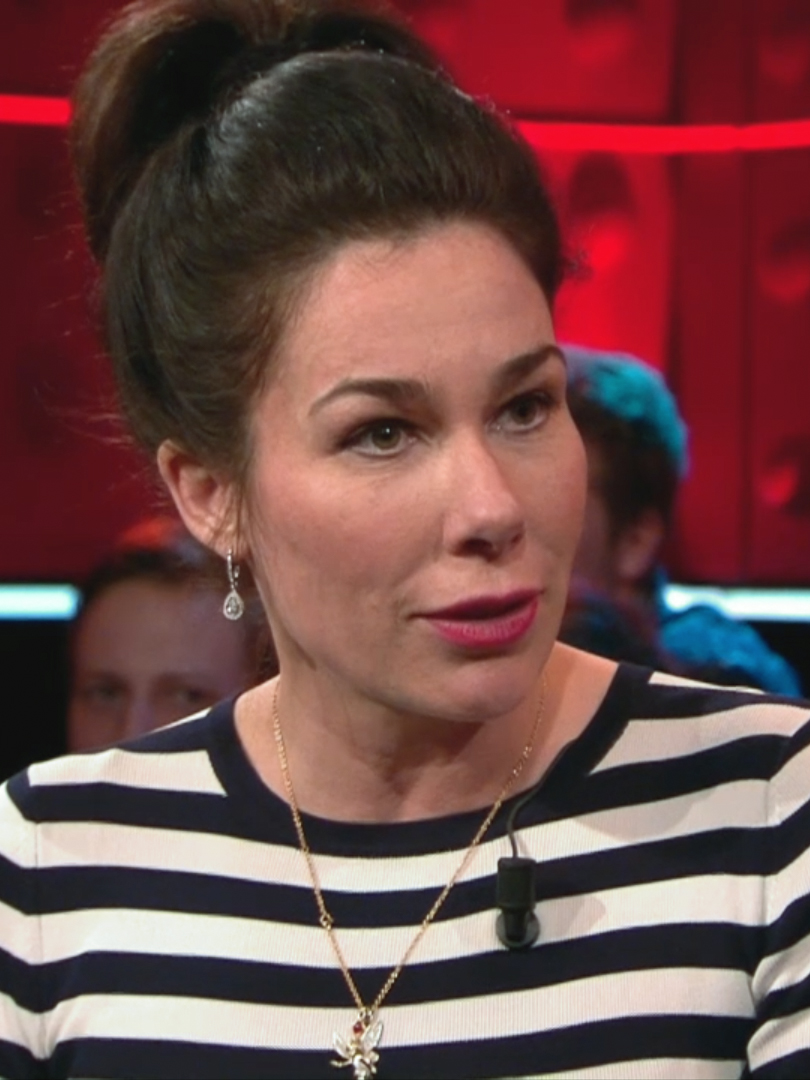
Halina Reijn in De Wereld Draait Door (2018)

In 2005, she released her first novel, the semi-autobiographical Prinsesje Nooitgenoeg (Prometheus, 2005), which she wrote during her first stay in Hollywood. Her second book was a collection of columns, presented as a diary, which she wrote for Viva, called Halina: doen alsof ik iemand anders ben (Prometheus, 2009). Her next work was Antiglamour (Nijgh & Van Ditmar 2013), a fashion style guide and an exploration of her friendship with her best friend Carice van Houten, who co-wrote the book. Her latest book was Loos (Nijgh & Van Ditmar 2016).

With fellow actor Robert de Hoog, she presented the weekly film programme called Close Up on the premium television service Film1, where they discussed what the various channels had to offer that week; the show had its debut on 13 September 2013 and it was broadcast on Film1 Premiere. In 2013, for a company called Soundtrackcity, Reijn was one of the voices for an audio tour through De Pijp, Amsterdam. It traces the footsteps of writer Herman Heijermans using fragments of his work as a basis. Since 2016, she has provided her voice for the audio tour of the Old Church located in Amsterdam. Writing these film scripts and magazines led her to later to be named one of the top 20 most influential people in the Dutch media.

Reijn was a regular guest and co-host on the talk show De Wereld Draait Door (DWDD), the popular TV show attracted audiences over one million people for the majority of its 15-season duration.

== Personal life ==
When Reijn was around six or seven years old, she and one of her sisters wanted to join the Catholic Church, to the shock of their parents. After they relented, the children would go to Sunday school, and when Reijn was twelve she was baptised. In a 2007 interview with the NRC, she remarks that she doesn't believe in God, but does in reincarnation.

Reijn has a close friendship with fellow Dutch actress Carice van Houten, whom she has known since about 1994. They worked together in movies Black Book and Valkyrie. In 2013, the two published a book together called Anti Glamour, a (mock) style guide and a celebration of their friendship, as well as a candid look into the unglamorous back-stage side of their lives. Although the two occasionally kiss on camera, and have joked about being lesbians, there is no actual romantic involvement.

Reijn moved to New York in 2021 for Bodies Bodies Bodies when the movie was greenlit, and then decided to stay on a permanent basis, and was still living there as of March 2024.

== Acting credits ==
=== Film ===
Year	Title	Role	Notes	Ref.
1998	Rotterdams – Temper! Temper!		Short	
2000	De Omweg	Sara		
2001	Îles flottantes	Isa		
2001	Zus & Zo	Bo		
2001	Flicka	Flicka	Short	
2002	Villa des Roses	Natsje		
2002	The Afghan	Woman in Car		
2003	Grimm	Maria		
2003	X & the Wildmen	X	Short	
2003	Polleke	Tina		
2003	Father's Affair	Ellen		
2005	Lentelied	Mother	Short	
2006	A Thousand Kisses	Lureen		
2006	Black Book	Ronnie		
2006	For a Few Marbles More	Mother of Michiel	Voice; short	
2007	Blind	Marie		
2007	Nadine	Nadine, 32 years old		
2008	Valkyrie	Margarethe von Oven		
2010	Win/Win	Deniz		
2010	Great Lengths		Short	
2010	Sterke verhalen	Hostess		
2010	Sintel	Sintel	Voice; short	
2010	The Dinner Club	Hanneke		
2011	Isabelle	Isabelle		
2012	Goltzius and the Pelican Company	Portia		
2012	Netherlands Film Festival: Commercial 2012		Video short	
2013	Feuten: Het Feestje	Femke		
2014	Tour de Force	Kassiererin		
2014	Gift from the Heart	Karin		
2015	Boy 7	Marit		
2015	Nature Is Speaking	Moeder Natuur (Mother Nature)	Voice; short	
2016	De Zevende Hemel	Eva		
2017	Love Revisited	Tess		

=== Television ===
Year	Title	Role	Notes	Ref.
1993	Coverstory	Dienstmeisje Laban	Episode: "Bitter erfgoed"	
1995	Pril geluk	Sanne	Main cast (13 episodes)	
1995	In voor-en tegenspoed	Clerk	Episode: "Zeeuws met kroepoek"	
1997	Fort Alpha	Eva de Beer	Episode: "A Hard Days Night"	
1998	Unit 13	Anne-Marie Ruyter	Episode: " Infiltratie"	
1999	De zeven deugden	Roos	Episode: "Matigheid: Doolhof"	
1999	Baantjer	Anna	Episode: "De Cock en de pianomoord"	
1999	Leven en dood van Quidam Quidam	Barbella	Guest star (3 episodes)	
2000	Wet & Waan	Katja Koster	Episode: "Richard, Rutger, Roderik"	
2001	De acteurs	Ellie		
2002	IC	Michelle	Episode: "Horen, zien en zwijgen"	
2005	Parels & Zwijnen	Maria Stagioni	Episode: "De gezusters Stagioni"	
2007	De Prins en het Meisje	Mabel Wisse Smit	TV miniseries	
2010	In therapie	Lara	Main cast	
2011	Van God Los	Nadia	Episode: "Kortsluiting"	
2013	Charlie	Charlie	Main cast (10 episodes); Dutch remake of Nurse Jackie	
2014	Jeuk	Halina	Episode: "Een hoer over de vloer"	
2015	Bagels & Bubbels	Vanessa Kremer	Main cast (8 episodes)	
2018	Familie Kruys	Halina Reijn	Guest star (3 episodes)	
2018	Conspiracy of Silence	Maggie van Haal	Main cast (8 episodes)	
2020	Red Light	Esther Vinkel	Main cast (10 episodes); also creator, producer and writer	

TV movies

Year	Title	Role	Ref.
1998	De wet op het kleinbedrijf		
1999	De Trein van zes uur tien	Mieke Volkers	
1999	Suzy Q	Prostitute	
1999	Zaanse nachten		
2001	Herschreven vriendschap		
2002	De afrekening		
2002	Ware liefde	Charlotte	
2003	Boy Ecury	Ewouds' girlfriend	
2003	Het wonder van Máxima	Hostess Patty	
2005	Masterclass	Actress 2	
2012	De overloper	Hannie de Groot	
2015	De leerling	Lana	

=== Theatre ===
Year	Title	Role	Theatre	Notes	Ref.
1997	Hamlet	Ophelia	De Trust		
1998	The Cherry Orchard	Dunyasha	De Trust		
1998	Shopping and Fucking	Lulu	De Trust		
1999	The Last Ones	Ljoeba	De Trust		
1999	Adel Blank	Maid	De Trust / De Mexicaanse Hond		
2000	Jeff Koons	Cicciolina	De Trust		
2001	Lulu	Lulu	De Theatercompagnie		
2002	Con Amore	Poppea	Toneelgroep Amsterdam	Adaptation of L'incoronazione di Poppea	
2002	Hamlet	Ophelia	De Theatercompagnie		
2003	The Seagull	Nina	De Theatercompagnie		
2003	Three Sisters	Irina	Toneelgroep Amsterdam		
2003-'14	Mourning Becomes Electra	Lavinia Mannon	Toneelgroep Amsterdam / Toneelschuur		
2005-'13	The Taming of the Shrew	Katharina	Toneelgroep Amsterdam		
2006	Huis van de toekomst	Anna Tabaknikova	Toneelgroep Amsterdam		
2006-'12	Hedda Gabler	Hedda	Toneelgroep Amsterdam		
2006-'07	Oresteia	Elektra	Toneelgroep Amsterdam / NTGent		
2007	Ajax	Tecmessa	Toneelgroep Amsterdam / De Theatercompagnie		
2007	Perfect Wedding	Heiner	Toneelgroep Amsterdam		
2008-'09	Rocco and His Brothers	Nadia	Toneelgroep Amsterdam		
2009-'19	La voix humaine	Solo performance	Toneelgroep Amsterdam		
2009-'15	Cries and Whispers	Maria	Toneelgroep Amsterdam		
2009-'11	Antonioni Project	Vittoria	Toneelgroep Amsterdam	Adaptation of L'Avventura, La Notte and L'Eclisse.	
2010-'13	Children of the Sun	Lisa	Toneelgroep Amsterdam / NTGent		
2011-'13	De Russen!	Sarah	Toneelgroep Amsterdam	Adaptation of Platonov and Ivanov	
2012-'13	Husbands	7 roles	Toneelgroep Amsterdam		
2012-'15	Nora	Nora	Toneelgroep Amsterdam		
2014	Danton's Death	St. Just, Julie, Lucile, Marion	Toneelgroep Amsterdam		
2014-'19	The Fountainhead	Dominique Francon	Toneelgroep Amsterdam		
2014-'15	Mary Stuart	Mary Stuart	Toneelgroep Amsterdam / Toneelhuis Antwerp		
2015-'20	The Hidden Force	Leonie van Oudijck	Toneelgroep Amsterdam		
2016-'19	Husbands and Wives	Judy	Toneelgroep Amsterdam		
2017	Obsession	Hanna	Toneelgroep Amsterdam		
2017	Othello	Emilia	Toneelgroep Amsterdam		

== Filmmaking credits ==
Film

Year	Title	Director	Writer	Producer	Ref.
2019	Instinct	Yes	Yes	Yes	
2022	Bodies Bodies Bodies	Yes	No	No	
2024	Babygirl	Yes	Yes	Yes	
TBA	Please	Yes	Yes	Yes	

Short film

Year	Title	Director	Writer	Producer	Notes	Ref.
2021	For The Birds	Yes	Yes	Yes		
2025	The Tiger	Yes	Yes	No	Commercial film for Gucci; co-directed/co-written with Spike Jonze	

== Awards and nominations ==
Year	Work	Association	Category	Result	Ref(s).
1998	Shopping and Fucking	Dutch Association of Theater and Concert Hall Directors	Colombina	Won	
2004	Father's Affair	Netherlands Film Festival	Golden Calf for Best Leading Role	Nominated	
2004	Mourning Becomes Electra	Dutch Association of Theater and Concert Hall Directors	Theo d'Or	Nominated	
2006	Black Book	Netherlands Film Festival	Golden Calf for Best Supporting Role	Nominated	
2007	Herself	Berlin International Film Festival	Shooting Stars Award	Won	
2007	De Prins en het Meisje	Netherlands Film Festival	Golden Calf Special Jury Prize	Won	
2007	Black Book	Rembrandt Award	Best Actress	Nominated	
2012	Isabelle	Rembrandt Award	Best Actress	Nominated	
2013	Nora	Dutch Association of Theater and Concert Hall Directors	Theo d'Or	Won	
2015	Maria Stuart	Dutch Association of Theater and Concert Hall Directors	Theo d'Or	Nominated	
2019	Instinct	Chicago International Film Festival	New Directors Competition	Nominated	
2019	Instinct	Locarno Film Festival	Variety Piazza Grande Award	Won	
2019	Instinct	Locarno Film Festival	Swatch Art Peace Hotel Award - Special Mention	Won	
2019	Instinct	London Film Festival	Sutherland Award	Nominated	
2019	Instinct	Les Arcs Film Festival	Cineuropa Award	Won	
2019	Instinct	Les Arcs Film Festival	Young Audience Award	Won	
2020	Instinct	European Film Awards	European Discovery of the Year	Nominated	
2020	Instinct	Miami Film Festival	Jordan Ressler First Feature Award	Nominated	
2020	Instinct	Netherlands Film Festival	Golden Calf for Best Script	Nominated	
2020	Instinct	Palm Springs International Film Festival	FIPRESCI Prize for Best Foreign Language Film	Nominated	
2020	Red Light	Netherlands Film Festival	Golden Calf - Best Actress	Won	
2020	Red Light	Netherlands Film Festival	Golden Calf for Best Television Drama	Won	
2020	Red Light	Canneseries	Special Interpretation Prize	Won	
2022	Bodies Bodies Bodies	Online Film & Television Awards	Best Feature Debut	Nominated	
2022	Bodies Bodies Bodies	SXSW	Audience Award: Headliners	Nominated	
2023	Bodies Bodies Bodies	Independent Spirit Awards	Independent Spirit Award for Best Director	Nominated	
2024	Babygirl	Venice International Film Festival	Golden Lion	Nominated	
2024	Babygirl	Gotham Independent Film Awards 2024	Best Feature	Nominated	
2024	Babygirl	Palm Springs International Film Festival	Directors to Watch	Won	
2026	Herself	Netherlands Film Festival	Golden Calf for Film Culture	Won	
