= Lucas Van den Eynde =

Belgian actor

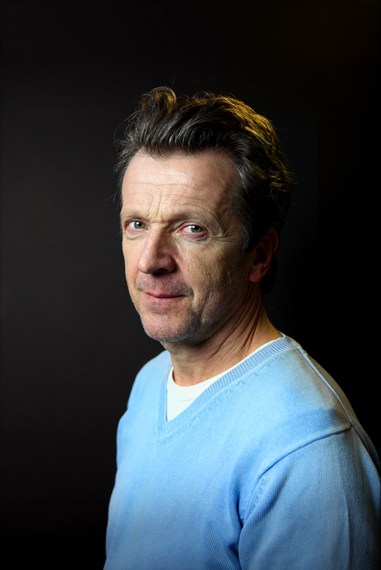
- Born: 23 February 1959 (age 67); Lier, Belgium
- Occupation: Actor
- Years active: 1985–present

Lucas Van den Eynde (born 23 February 1959) is a Belgian actor who has acted in theater films and television programs and also dubbed animated films in Belgian Dutch.

In 1998, he was the recipient of the Arlecchino Award (the award presented annually by the VSCD to the best supporting actor of the Dutch theater season) for his role as Edwaar in Ten Oorlog, which was followed by the 1999 Louis d'Or for his lead role as Bruno in Bruno in De cocu magnifique oftewel de wonderbaarlijke hoorndrager.

In 2013, he appeared in Salamander.

== Work ==
In the theater he played with, among other theater companies, Blauwe Maandag Compagnie, Het Toneelhuis, 't Arsenaal, and with the KVS in De Drumleraar, In de naam van de Vader en de Zoon, Ten oorlog, Zullen we het liefde noemen and Diplodocus Deks. He also toured for years with Jukebox, liedjes op verzoek with Tine Embrechts and Nele Bauwens.

He became a well-known TV actor in the role of "professional farewell taker" Xavier De Baere, in which he first appeared in Morgen Maandag. De Baere was also the closing party of the "50 years of Flemish Television" (Dutch: 50 jaar Vlaamse Televisie) festival. Van den Eynde then played Bert "Bucky" Laplasse, another well-known character in Flemish television, in the second series of Het eiland.

From 2004, Van den Eynde played a leading role in the police series Aspe (disambiguation), that of sergeant Guido Versavel. He played this character for four seasons, but left the series in 2008 to focus more on stage and musical projects that year. Van den Eynde was briefly seen in a guest appearance during the fifth season of the series. In 2014, he reprised the role of Guido Versavel in the five concluding episodes of the last season.

At the end of 2008, Van den Eynde played in the musical Daens (Studio 100), in which he played the title role. In 2009, he played the butcher André Vangenechten in the television series Van Vlees en Bloed, a character that came to be known as the bospoeper. Van den Eynde played a prominent role in the highly successful television series Salamander in 2013, as Carl Cassimon. In 2017, he starred in the second season of Spitsbroers, playing businessman Toni Beernaert, a board member and later also the chairman of a fictional representation of football club Racing Genk.

In 1998, he received an Arlecchino from the VSCD in the Netherlands for his role as Edwaar in Ten Oorlog. In 1999, the Louis d'Or followed for his lead role as Bruno in Bruno in De cocu magnifique oftewel de wonderbaarlijke hoorndrager.

== Personal life ==
Van den Eynde got married in 2005 and together with his wife Sofie he has a daughter, Flore, born in 2003 and a son, Lou, born in 2008.

In 2014, he toured Flanders with Jan De Smet, Barbara Dex and Nele Goossens with the program Kleinkunsteiland.

== Filmography ==
=== Film ===
Year	Title	Role	Notes
1993	Seventh Heaven		
1993	Ad Fundum	Police officer Pots	
2002	Step by Step	The Dutchman	
2003	The Alzheimer Case	Bob Van Camp	
2009	The Over the Hill Band	Michel	
2010	Frits and Freddy	Sjarel Willems	
2011	Groenten uit Balen	Piet Populiers	

=== Television ===
Year	Title	Role	Notes
1990	Alfa Papa Tango		1 episode
1995–1996	Kulderzipken	Brother Grimm	Main role (10 episodes)
1996	Buiten De Zone	Dr. De Waele	2 episodes
2000–2001	In de gloria	Dagtripper	Main role (20 episodes)
2005–2008	Russian Dolls: Sex Trade	Nico Maes	Main role (8 episodes)
2009	Van Vlees en Bloed	André Vangenechten	Main role (7 episodes)
2009	Mega Mindy	Jef	Episode: "Kermis in het dorp"
2010	Witse	André Vestiaux	2 episodes
2013	Salamander	Carl Cassimon	Recurring role (11 episodes)
2016	Vermist	Johan Cools	Episode: "Louic"
2019	Undercover	Ignace Devlaeminck	3 episodes

== Voice roles ==
Year	Title	Role	Notes
2009	Luke and Lucy: The Texas Rangers	Lambik	
2021	Sabena	Narrator	

== Dubbing roles ==
=== Animated films ===
Year	Title	Role	Notes
1998	Mulan	Shang	
2001	Shrek	Shrek	
2002	Ice Age	Diego	
2004	Shrek 2	Shrek	
2006	Ice Age: The Meltdown	Diego	
2007	Shrek the Third	Shrek	
2009	Ice Age: Dawn of the Dinosaurs	Diego	
2010	Shrek Forever After	Shrek	
2011	The Smurfs	Narrator Smurf	
2012	Ice Age: Continental Drift	Diego	
2016	Ice Age: Collision Course	Diego	

== Awards and nominations ==
Year	Award	Category	Project	Result	Ref.
1998	Arlecchino Award	Best Supporting Actor of the Dutch Theater Season	Ten Oorlog	Won	
1999	Louis d'Or	Best Actor of the Dutch Theater Season	Bruno in De cocu magnifique oftewel de wonderbaarlijke hoorndrager	Won	
