= Colombina (award) =

Award given by the Dutch Association of Theater and Concert Hall Directors

The Colombina is an award that is awarded annually in the form of a bronze statue by a jury of the Dutch Association of Theater and Concert Hall Directors to the most impressive female supporting actress of the Dutch theater season.

First awarded in 1964, the statuette has been designed by Eric Claus since 2005. Previous designers were Nic Jonk, and Pépé Grégoire. It is named after the Columbina stock character from the commedia dell'arte, and it is a companion piece to the Arlecchino, the prize awarded to the most impressive male supporting actor of the season.

== Winners ==
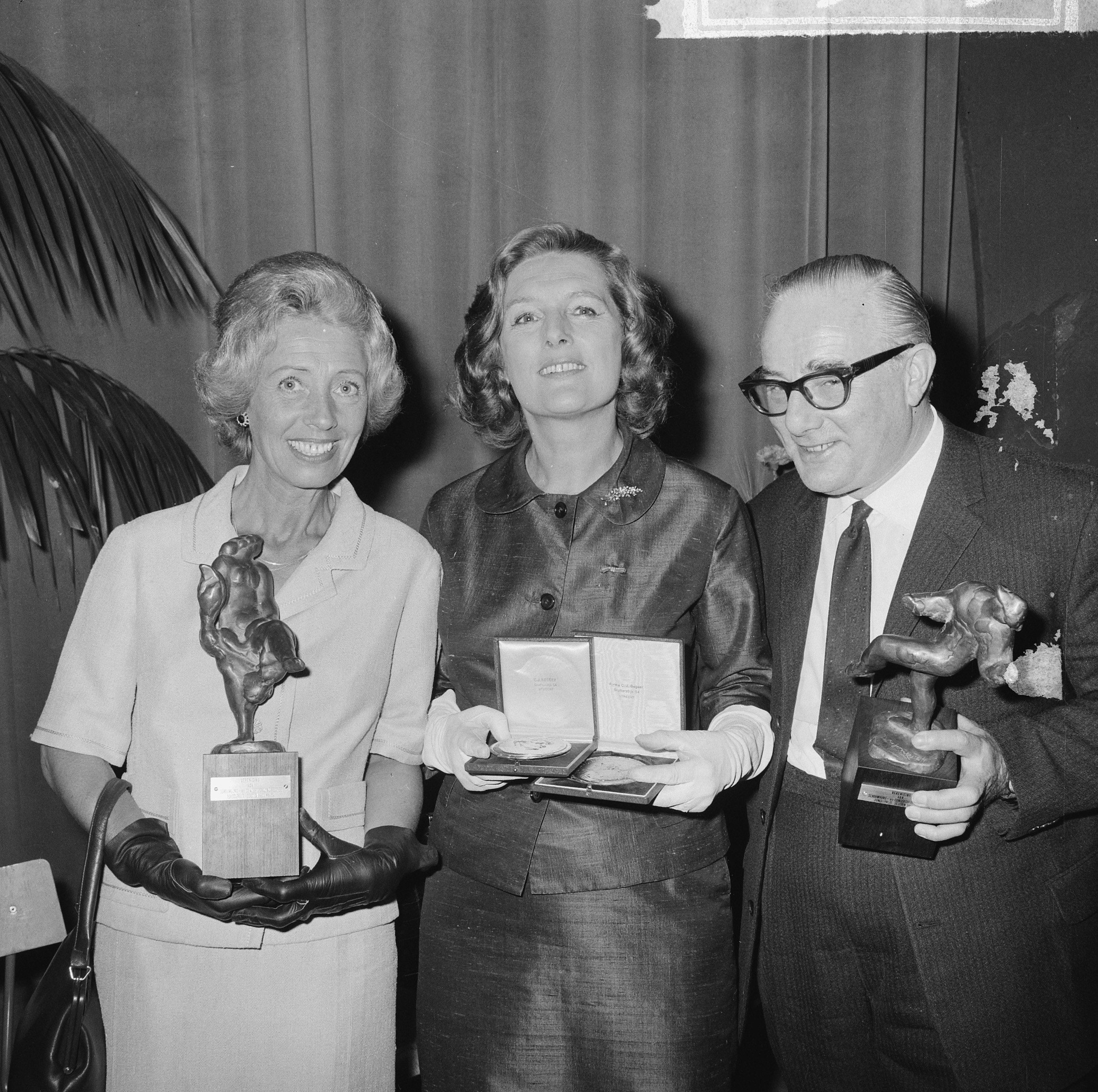
Enny Meunier was awarded the first Colombina in 1964

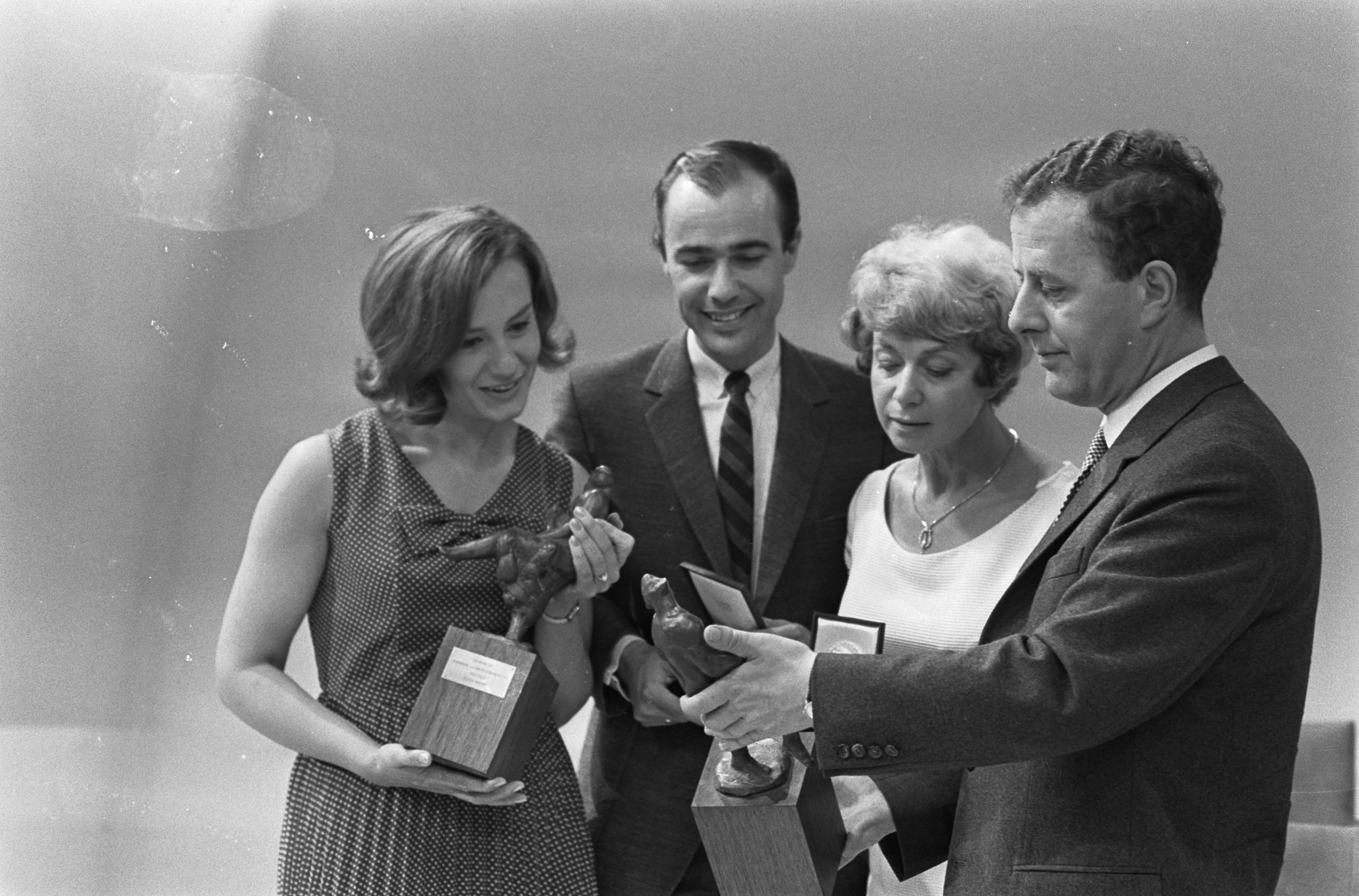
Colombina 1967: Anne Wil Blankers (left)

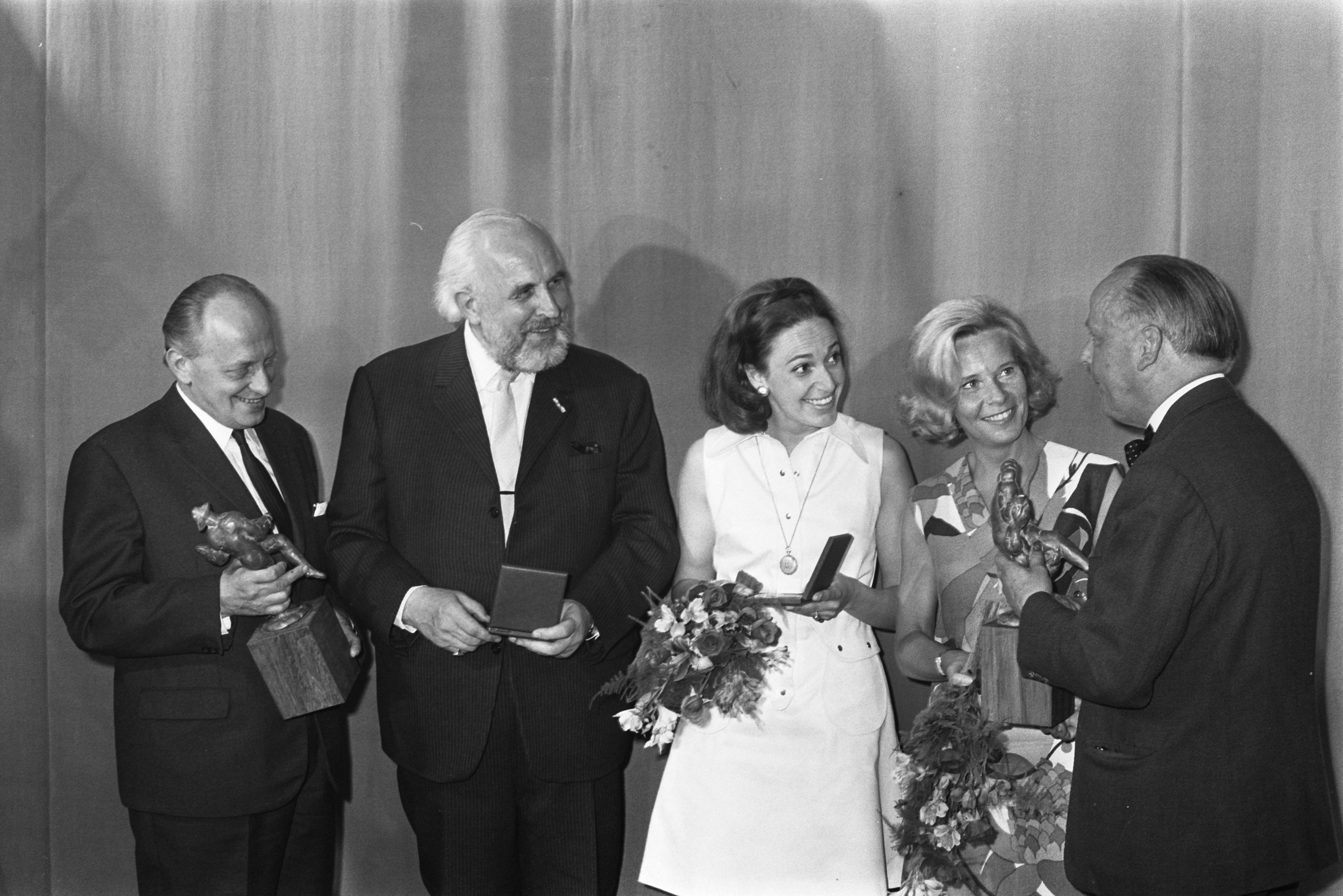
Colombina 1969: Kitty Janssen(right)

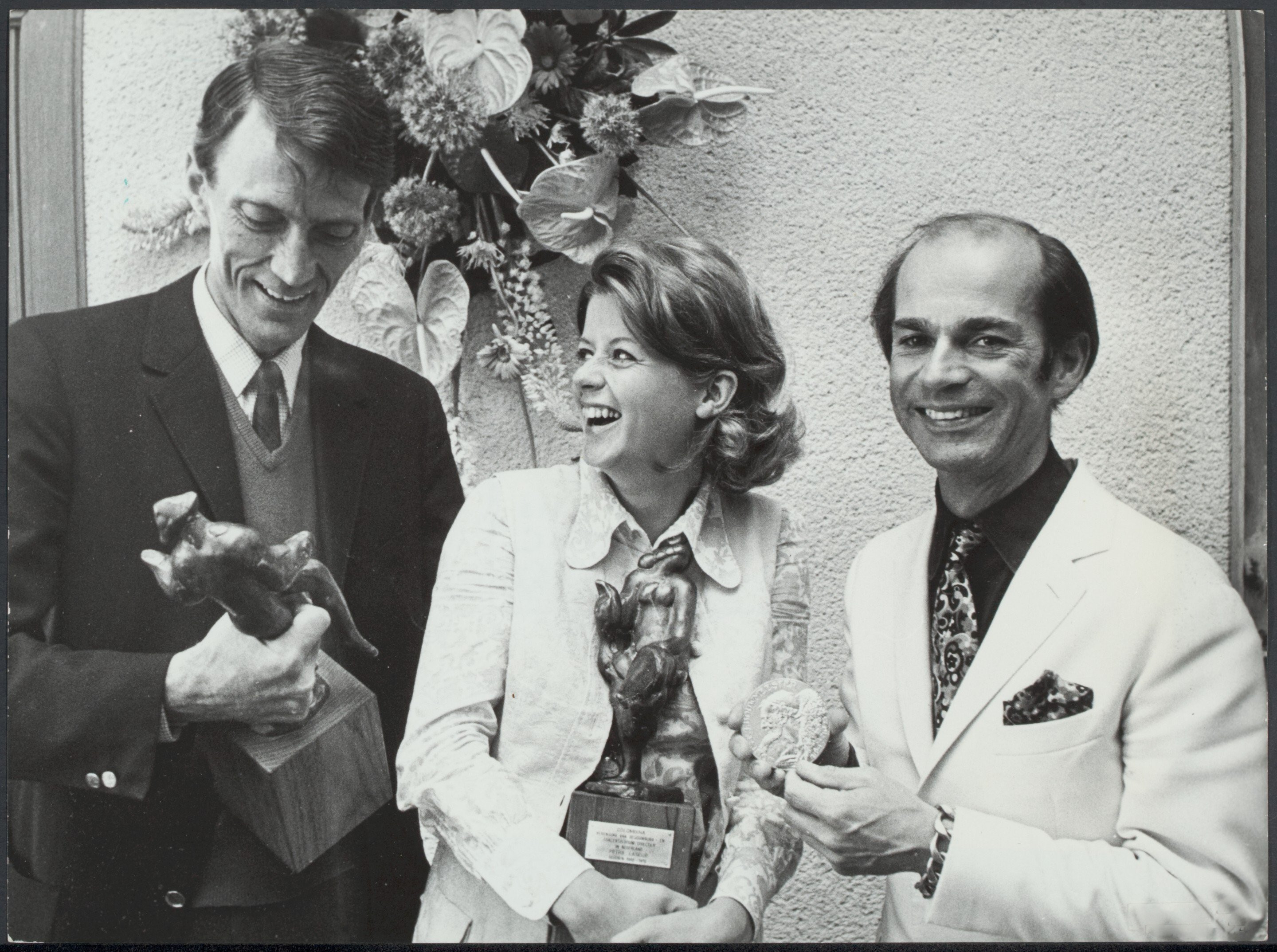
Colombina 1970: Petra Laseur

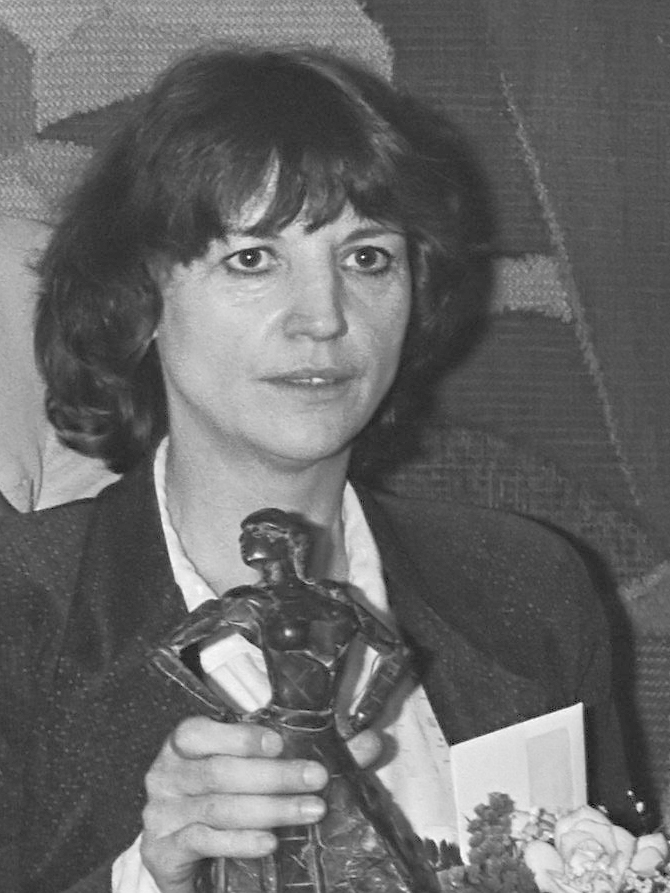
Colombina 1980: Kitty Courbois

Past winners were:

- 1964: Enny Meunier
- 1965: Elisabeth Andersen
- 1966: Loudi Nijhoff
- 1967: Anne Wil Blankers
- 1968: Marja Habraken
- 1969: Kitty Janssen
- 1970: Petra Laseur
- 1971: Ann Hasekamp
- 1972: Elisabeth Andersen
- 1973: Cançi Geraerdts
- 1974: Sjoukje Hooymaayer
- 1975: Josée Ruiter
- 1976: Ellen Vogel
- 1977: Henny Orri
- 1978: Bea Meulman
- 1979: Pauline van Rhenen
- 1980: Kitty Courbois
- 1981: Trins Snijders
- 1982: Nettie Blanken
- 1983: Do van Stek
- 1984: Marieke Beversluis
- 1985: Catherine ten Bruggencate
- 1986: Marlies Heuer
- 1987: Anita Menist
- 1988: Els Ingeborg Smits
- 1989: Els Dottermans
- 1990: Yvonne van den Hurk
- 1991: Trudy de Jong
- 1992: Elja Pelgrom
- 1993: Anneke Blok
- 1994: Marisa van Eyle
- 1995: Catherine ten Bruggencate
- 1996: Karlijn Sileghem
- 1997: Roos Ouwehand
- 1998: Halina Reijn
- 1999: Sien Eggers
- 2000: Tamar van den Dop
- 2001: Margôt Ros
- 2002: Tjitske Reidinga
- 2003: Carice van Houten
- 2004: Gilda De Bal
- 2005: Celia Nufaar
- 2006: Lineke Rijxman
- 2007: Fania Sorel
- 2008: Janni Goslinga
- 2009: Wine Dierickx
- 2010: Nanette Edens
- 2011: Lies Pauwels
- 2012: Frieda Pittoors
- 2013: Astrid van Eck
- 2014: Kirsten Mulder
- 2015: Antoinette Jelgersma
- 2016: Ilke Paddenburg
- 2017: Lotte Dunselman
- 2018: Maureen Teeuwen
- 2019: Rosa van Leeuwen
- 2020: not awarded due to COVID19; with nominations
- 2021: Sanne Samina Hanssen
- 2022: Helen Kamperveen
