= Arlecchino (award) =

Dutch theatre acting award

The Arlecchino is an award that is awarded annually in the form of a bronze statue by a jury of the Dutch Association of Theater and Concert Hall Directors (VSCD) as a prize for the most impressive male supporting actor role of the Dutch theater season. The prize bears the Italian name of the character Harlequin, and was first awarded in 1964. The figurine has been designed by Eric Claus since 2005. Previous designers were Nic Jonk, and Pépé Grégoire.

It is the pendant of the Colombina, the annual prize for best Dutch actress in a supporting role, named after the maid Columbina from the commedia dell'arte.

== Winners ==
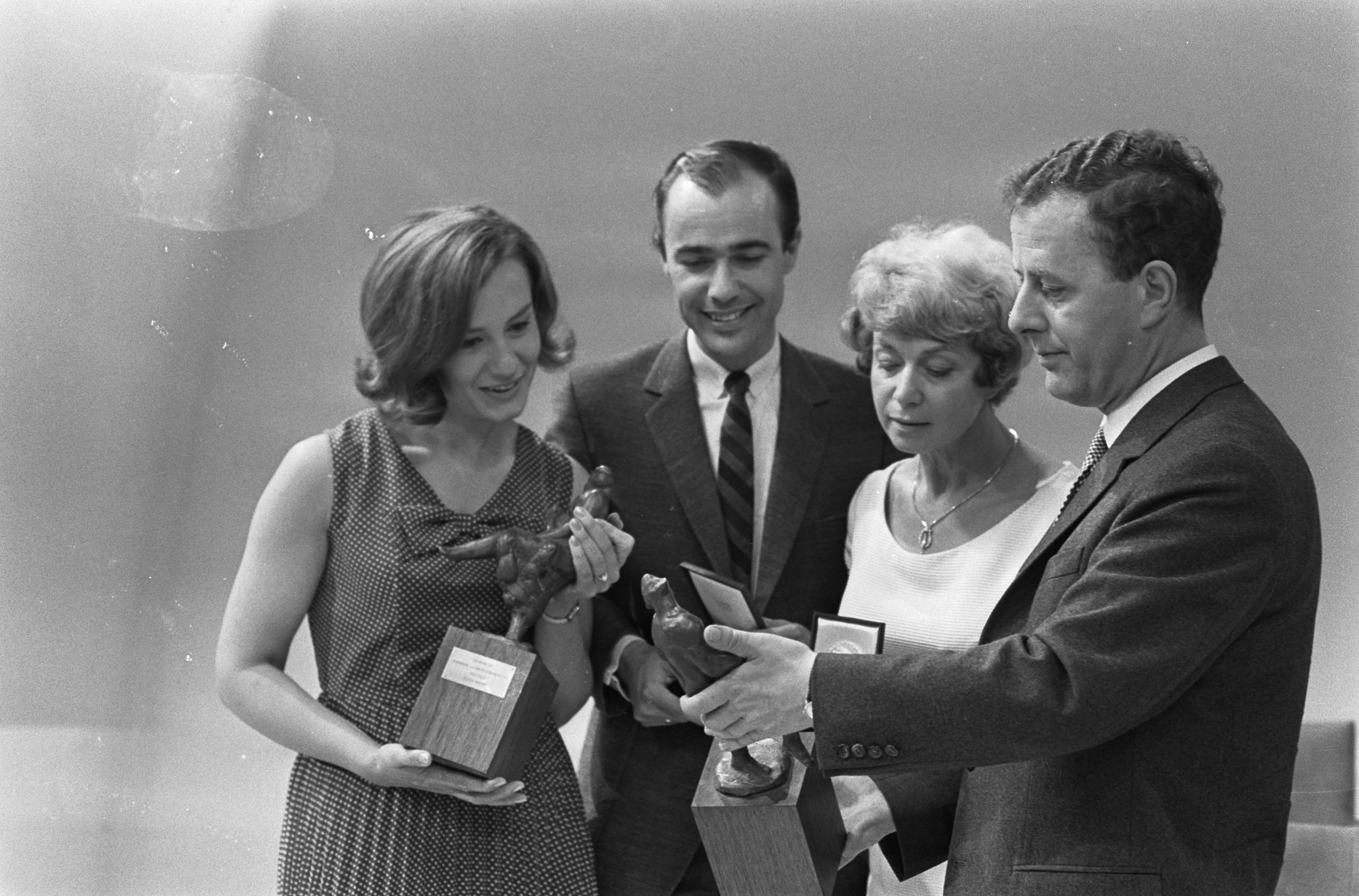
Arlecchino 1967: Luc Lutz (right)

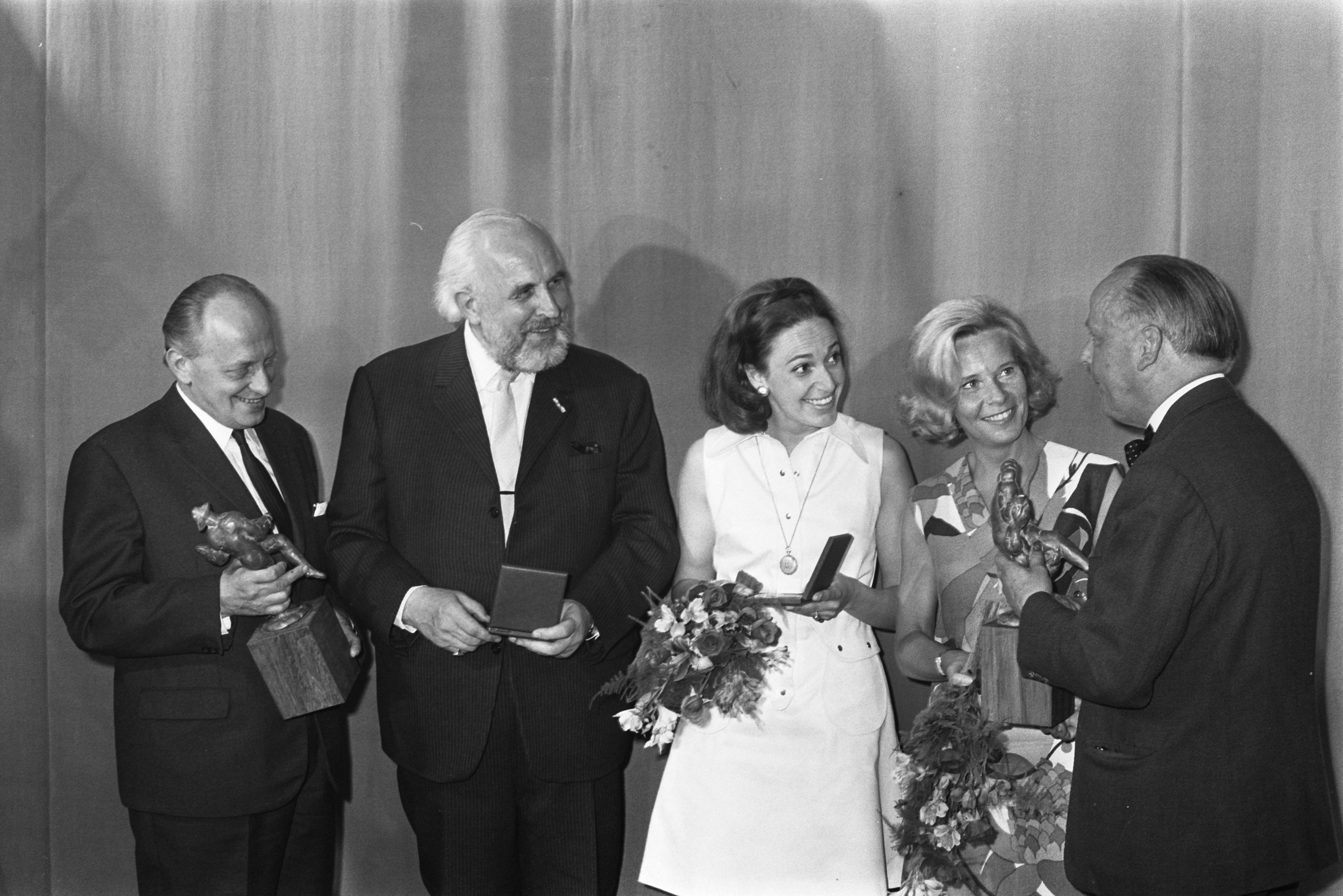
Arlecchino 1969: Sacco van der Made (left)

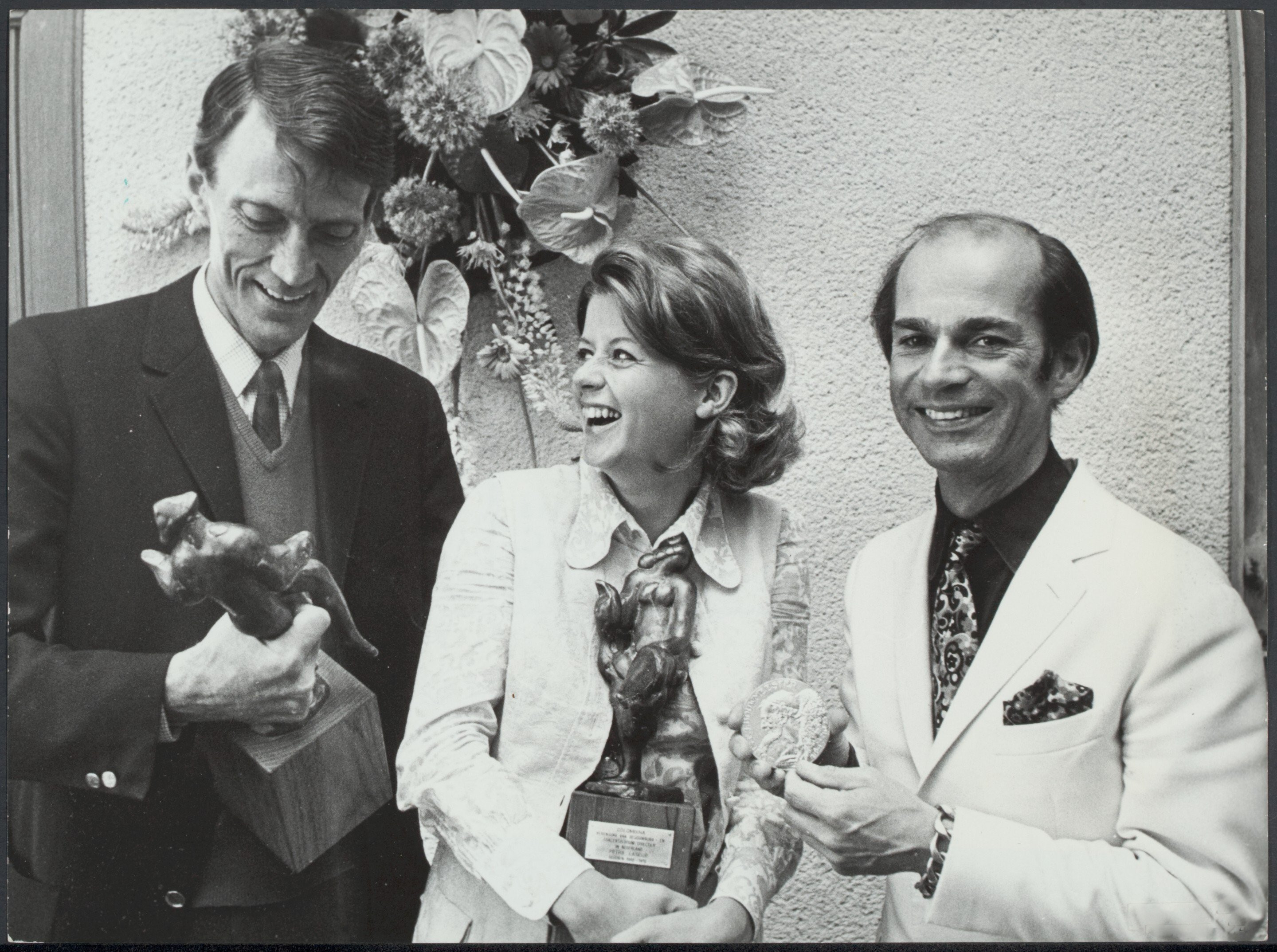
Arlecchino 1970: Frans van der Lingen (left)

Past winners were:

- 1964: Wim van den Brink
- 1965: André van den Heuvel
- 1966: Ton van Duinhoven
- 1967: Luc Lutz
- 1968: Peter van der Linden
- 1969: Sacco van der Made
- 1970: Frans van der Lingen
- 1971: Lou Landré
- 1972: Piet Römer
- 1973: Wim Kouwenhoven
- 1974: Edmond Classen
- 1975: Eric van Ingen
- 1976: Gijsbert Tersteeg
- 1977: Henk Rigters
- 1978: Frans Vorstman
- 1979: Willem Wagter
- 1980: Siem Vroom
- 1981: Henk Votel
- 1982: Wim van Rooij
- 1983: Eric van Ingen
- 1984: Titus Muizelaar
- 1985: Edwin de Vries
- 1986: Gijs Scholten van Aschat
- 1987: Porgy Franssen
- 1988: Theo Pont
- 1989: Kees Hulst
- 1990: Vic De Wachter
- 1991: Victor Löw
- 1992: Kees Coolen
- 1993: Rik Launspach
- 1994: Khaldoun El Mecky
- 1995: Han Kerckhoffs
- 1996: Henk Votèl
- 1997: Patrick Deleu
- 1998: Lucas Van den Eynde
- 1999: Paul Hoes
- 2000: Jim van der Woude
- 2001: Geert Lageveen and Frank Lammers
- 2002: no nominations
- 2003: Kees Boot
- 2004: Pierre Bokma
- 2005: Bob Schwarze
- 2006: Jacob Derwig
- 2007: Hein van der Heijden
- 2008: Rudolf Lucieer
- 2009: Benny Claessens
- 2010: Stefan de Walle
- 2011: Peter Bolhuis
- 2012: Gijs Naber
- 2013: Stefan de Walle
- 2014: Martijn Nieuwerf
- 2015: Vincent van der Valk
- 2016: Risto Kübar
- 2017: Maarten Heijmans
- 2018: Vanja Rukavina
- 2019: Mark Kraan
- 2020: not awarded due to COVID19; with nominations
- 2021: Jaap Spijkers
- 2022: Majd Mardo
- 2023: Rick Paul van Mulligen
