= Father's Affair =

2003 Dutch film by Maarten Treurniet

- Theatrical release poster
- Directed by: Maarten Treurniet
- Written by: Kees van Beijnum
- Based on: De Passievrucht by Karel Glastra van Loon
- Produced by: Anton Scholten; Monique van Welzen; José van Doorn
- Starring: Peter Paul Muller; Carice van Houten; Halina Reijn
- Cinematography: Wouter Suyderhoud
- Edited by: René Wiegmans
- Music by: Klaas ten Holt
- Production company: 24fps Productions
- Distributed by: Independent Films (Theatrical); Universal Pictures; (Home media)
- Release date: 11 December 2003
- Running time: 100 minutes
- Country: Netherlands
- Language: Dutch
- Box office: $779,462

Father's Affair (Dutch: De Passievrucht) is a 2003 Dutch drama film directed by Maarten Treurniet, written by Kees van Beijnum and starring Peter Paul Muller, Carice van Houten and Halina Reijn. based on the book of the same name by Karel Glastra van Loon.

It received a Golden Film award for 100,000 visitors and a Golden Calf award for Best Sound.

== Plot ==
Armin wants a child with his new girlfriend, although he already has a 13-year-old son Bo, but that is from his previous relationship with his deceased girlfriend Monika. After research it turns out that Armin is infertile and has always been that way. Armin is stunned and takes his son and girlfriend Ellen with him in his emotions. Now that he knows that Bo is not his son, he goes looking for the biological father, the story takes a huge turn.

Armin suspects every man who has been in Monika's life, and he must and will get the answers. In the end it turns out that Armin's father is also Bo's father...

== Cast ==
- Peter Paul Muller as Armin Minderhout
- Carice van Houten as Monika
- Halina Reijn as Ellen
- Jan Decleir as Huib Minderhout
- Dai Carter as Bo
- Frank Lammers as Dees
- Gijs Scholten van Aschat as doctor Terlinden
- Jeroen Willems as Robbert Hubeek
- André Arend van Noord as Niko Neerinckx
- Tjitske Reidinga as Anke Neerinckx
