= Theo d'Or =

Dutch acting award

The Theo d'Or is a Dutch acting award, given annually to the actress with the most impressive leading role of the theater season. It is awarded by the Vereniging van Schouwburg- en Concertgebouwdirecties (VSCD), the main trade organisation for theaters in The Netherlands. The award itself is a golden medal, currently designed by Eric Claus. It was named after the Dutch actress Theo Mann-Bouwmeester. Its male counterpart is the Louis d'Or, named after Theo's brother, Louis Bouwmeester.

The Theo d'Or is awarded annually, along with the other VSCD stage awards, at the Gala of Dutch Theater in the Stadsschouwburg in Amsterdam.

As of 2024, the Theo d'Ors will be allocated in a gender-neutral manner. As a result, the Louis d'Ors will no longer be awarded.

== Jury ==
The jury is compiled of theater programmers, producers and critics, who have explicitly provided themselves in their relative disciplines. Jurors can take part of a jury for maximal six years. New jurors can be nominated by the jury itself or be appointed by the board of the VSCD.

== Award winners ==
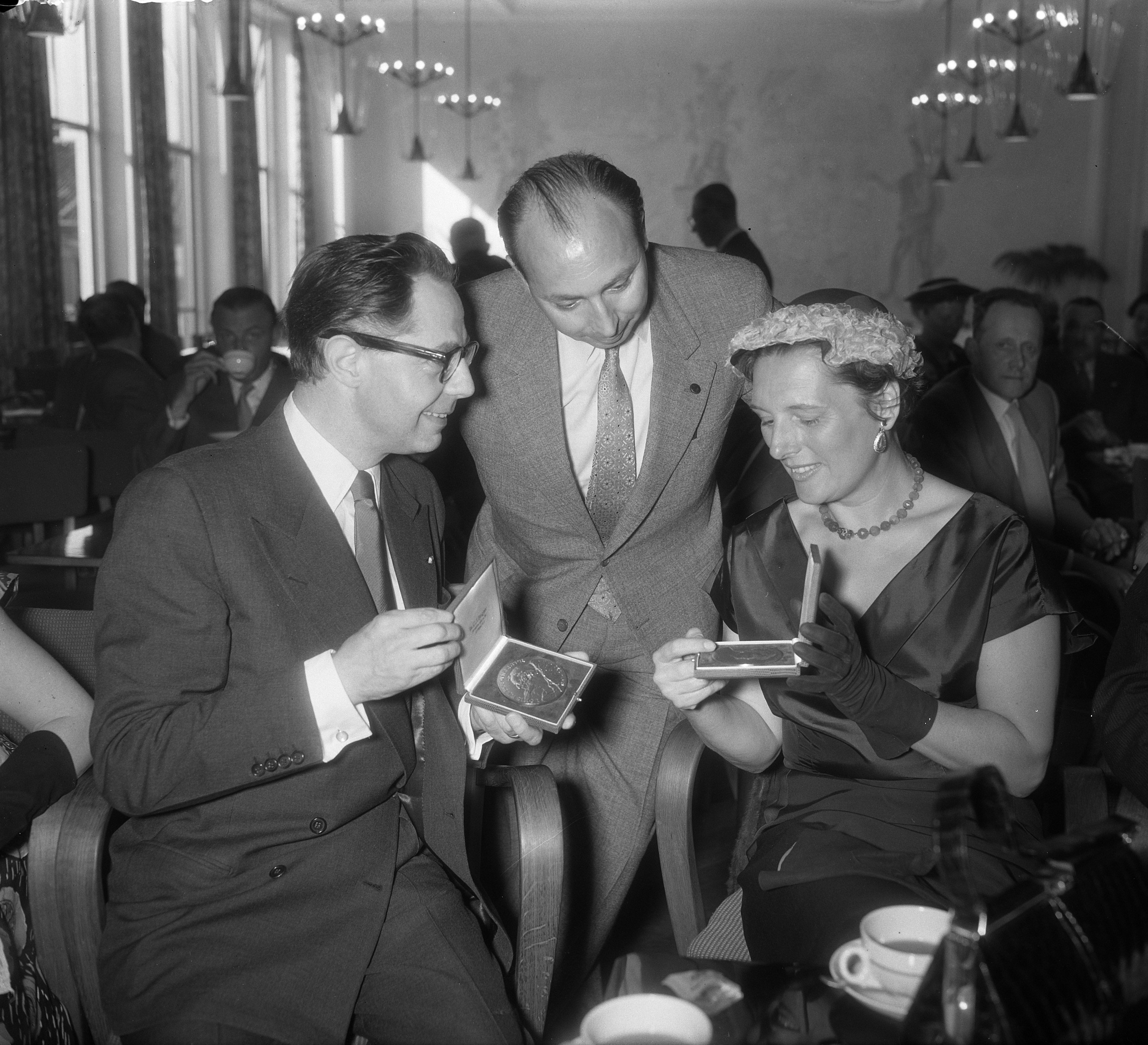
Theo d'Or 1955: Ank van der Moer

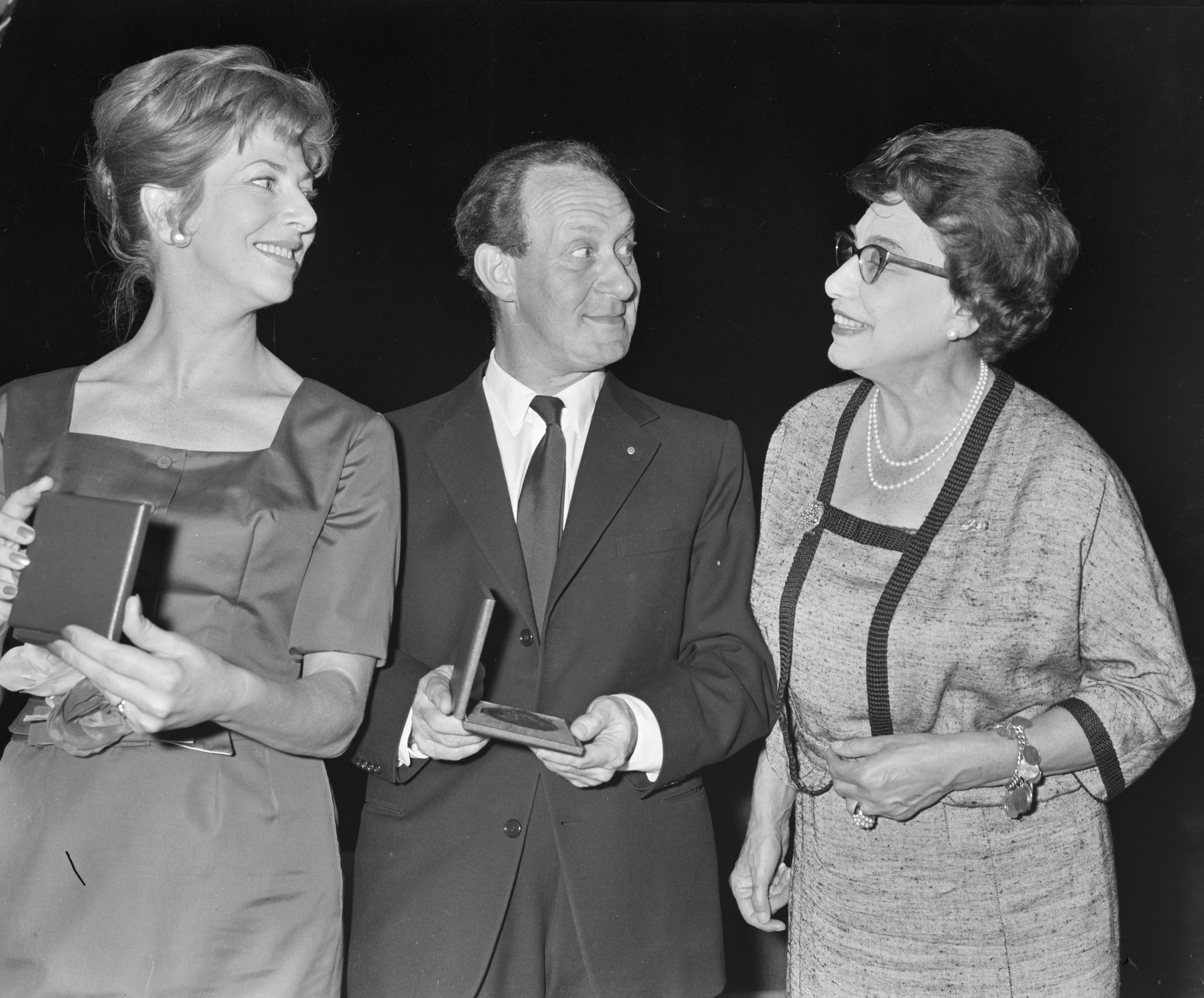
Theo d'Or 1961: Ellen Vogel (left)

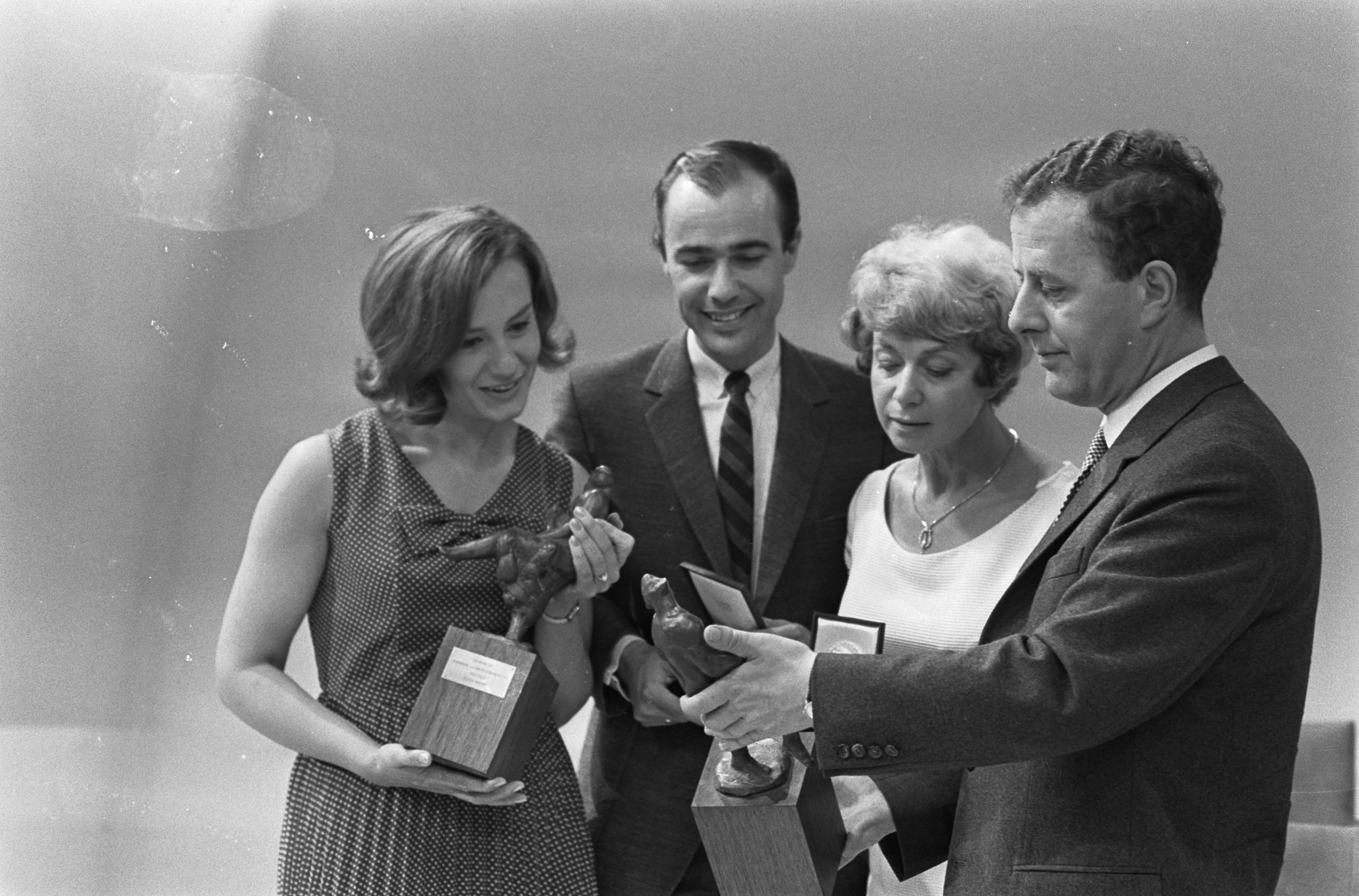
Theo d'Or 1967: Anny de Lange (right)

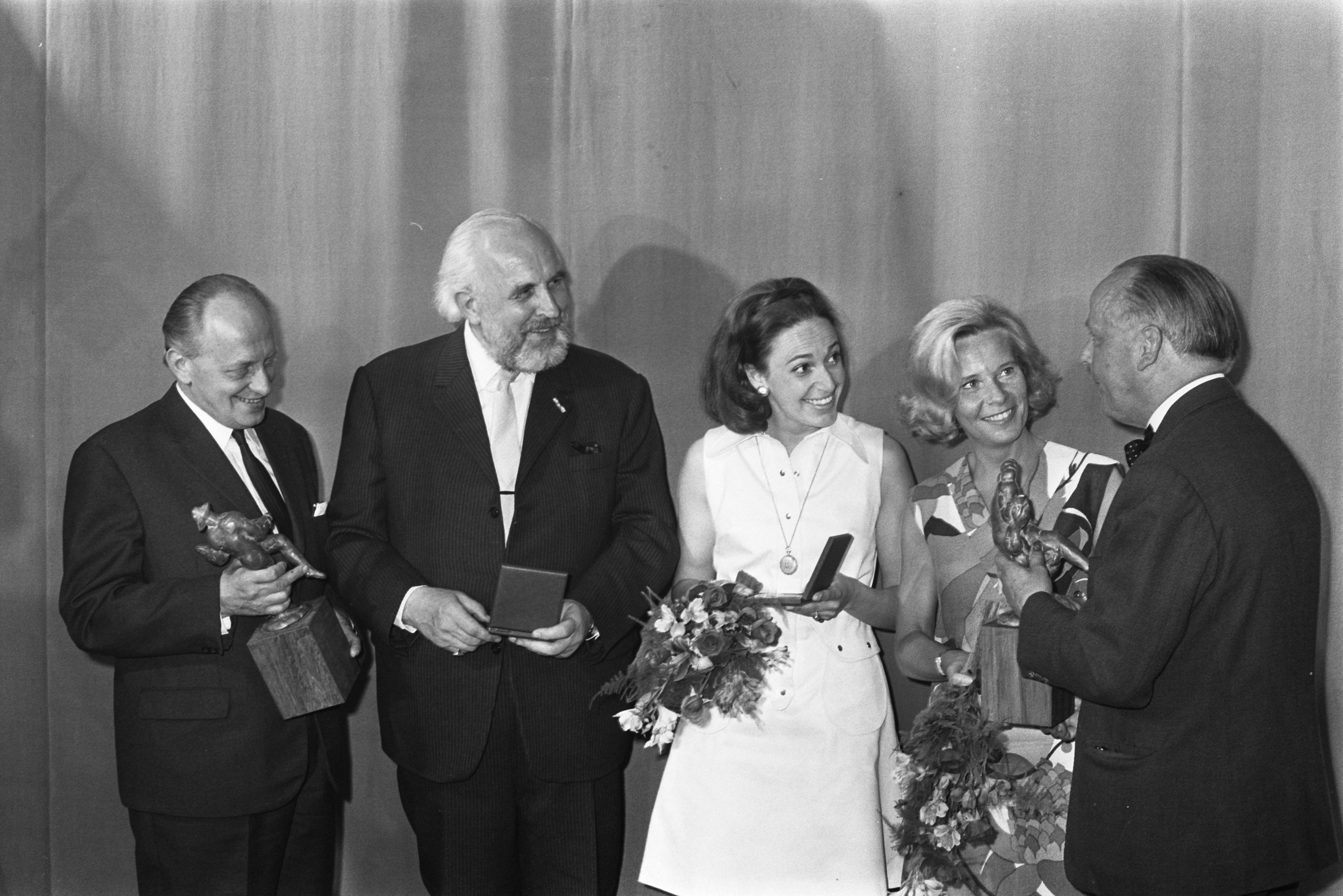
Theo d'Or 1969: Trins Snijders (white)

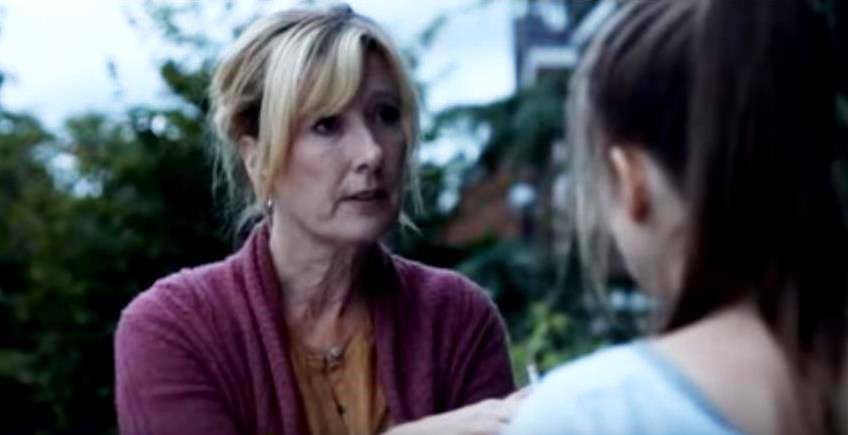
Ariane Schluter won the award in 2003 and 2004

- 1955: Ank van der Moer
- 1956: Ida Wasserman
- 1957: Myra Ward
- 1958: Elisabeth Andersen
- 1959: Ida Wasserman
- 1960: not awarded
- 1961: Ellen Vogel
- 1962: Anny de Lange
- 1963: not awarded
- 1964: Ank van der Moer
- 1965: Annet Nieuwenhuyzen
- 1966: Elisabeth Andersen
- 1967: Anny de Lange
- 1968: Andrea Domburg
- 1969: Trins Snijders
- 1970: Christine Ewert
- 1971: Lies Franken
- 1972: Loudi Nijhoff (refused)
- 1973: Petra Laseur
- 1974: Sacha Bulthuis
- 1975: Christine Ewert
- 1975: Annet Nieuwenhuyzen
- 1976: Anne Wil Blankers
- 1978: Mary Dresselhuys
- 1979: Caro van Eyck
- 1980: Josée Ruiter
- 1981: Petra Laseur
- 1982: Marjon Brandsma
- 1983: not awarded
- 1984: Elisabeth Andersen
- 1985: Anne Wil Blankers
- 1986: Henny Orri
- 1987: Viviane De Muynck
- 1988: Sigrid Koetse
- 1989: Andrea Domburg
- 1990: Katelijne Damen
- 1991: Catherine ten Bruggencate
- 1992: Els Dottermans
- 1993: Sacha Bulthuis
- 1994: Anneke Blok
- 1995: Ilse Uitterlinden
- 1996: Sylvia Poorta
- 1997: Trudy de Jong
- 1998: Marlies Heuer
- 1999: Marieke Heebink
- 2000: Marie-Louise Stheins
- 2001: Ria Eimers
- 2002: Betty Schuurman
- 2003: Ariane Schluter
- 2004: Ariane Schluter
- 2005: Bien de Moor
- 2006: Elsie de Brauw
- 2007: Will van Kralingen
- 2008: Chris Nietvelt
- 2009: Lineke Rijxman
- 2010: Maria Kraakman
- 2011: Elsie de Brauw
- 2012: Marlies Heuer
- 2013: Halina Reijn
- 2014: Abke Haring
- 2015: Marieke Heebink
- 2016: Wine Dierickx
- 2017: Romana Vrede
- 2018: Karina Holla
- 2019: Hannah Hoekstra
- 2020: not awarded due to the COVID-19 pandemic in the Netherlands
- 2021: Naomi Velissariou
- 2022: Hadewych Minis
- 2023: Mariana Aparicio Torres
