= Isabelle (2011 film) =

2011 Dutch thriller film

- Theatrical release poster
- Directed by: Ben Sombogaart
- Screenplay by: Marieke van der Pol
- Based on: Isabelle by Tessa de Loo
- Produced by: Frans Van Gestel; Jani Thiltges
- Starring: Halina Reijn; Tineke Caels
- Cinematography: Piotr Kukla
- Edited by: Herman P. Koerts
- Music by: Jeannot Sanavia
- Production companies: IDTV Film; NCRV; Samsa Film
- Distributed by: A-Film Distribution
- Release date: 22 September 2011 (Netherlands)
- Running time: 87 minutes
- Countries: Netherlands; Luxembourg
- Language: Dutch
- Box office: $134,730

Isabelle is a 2011 Dutch psychological thriller film directed by Ben Sombogaart and written for the screen by Marieke van der Pol based on the novel of the same name by Tessa de Loo. It stars Halina Reijn as the beautiful actress Isabelle that is kidnapped by the jealous disfigured artist Jeanne, played by Tineke Caels. It also stars Wim Opbrouck, Barbara Sarafian, Michel Van Dousselaere and Monique van de Ven.

The film was first shown at the Netherlands Film Festival on September 22, 2011 immediately followed by a release in Dutch theaters. It received a mixed reception from critics and a tepid response from the general audience.

== Plot ==
Isabelle, a famous, beautiful and successful Dutch actor, decides before a new film production to go on holiday with her parents to a holiday villa small village in the Ardennes. During her holiday, she is concerned about her weight, having to lose some weight before her next role. Jeanne, a Belgian artist and waitress, who is "disfigured" and is jealous of Isabelle's beauty and fame, has been stalking her and at one of her sun baths, Jeanne uses her dog to force Isabelle to follow her orders and demands. Together they walk to Jeanne's decrepit home. Isabelle who wants leave, isn't allowed and is thrown into a dungeon. She tries to scream for help, but the prison is in a remote location in the Ardennes forest.

Isabelle's parents alert the police, and they go on a month long investigation but they are unable to find Isabelle, dead or alive. Over the course, her disappearance is considered major news and where Jeanne works, the disappearance regularly covered on the television news. Meanwhile, in her captivity Isabelle is being mistreated, starved, while at the same time she being forced to model nude for Jeanne's painting. Using Isabelle's frail naked body, to make paintings that make a statement about beauty. Jeanne repeatedly taunts Isabelle and claims people find her hideous and is easily forgotten by other people. Any attempts by Isabelle to escape fail.

In the outside world, most people have forgotten about Isabelle, except for Bernard, a local man, who had seen Isabelle and had taken a secret nude photograph of her. He has been obsessing about her ever since, he has been collecting news clippings, attempting forays in to the forest and starting having erotic dreams about her. On one of his trips, he visits Jeanne's home but isn't made aware of Isabelle's presence. Isabelle's situation and body continues to deteriorate, having increased number bouts of faints and only for her pleas to go ignored. Communication between two women slowly softens, when Isabelle details about her negative experiences with her appearance, and Jeanne in return about her traumatizing childhood.

Jeanne begins giving Jeanne food and drinks. While two are taking their lunch outside, a smouldering cigarette that Jeanne used fell into a waste bin setting the kitchen aflame, trapping the dog. Instead of using the opportunity to escape, Isabelle helps to extinguish the flame. Their progress is undone, however, later, at the pub Jeanne and Bernard exchange conflicting information about Isabelle, in turn Jeanne lashes out at Isabelle. In her ultimate ploy, Isabelle fakes her own suicide by hanging, and is later found by Bernard. But before they leave, Isabelle tries and fails to convince Jeanne to not kill herself by fire and dies.

In the aftermath, Isabelle and Bernard depart the forest for civilization. In the end narration by Bernard, he states that Isabelle returned to her old weight, and that she had retired from acting and written a book.

== Cast ==
- Halina Reijn as Isabelle
- Tineke Caels as Jeanne
- Wim Opbrouck as Bernard
- Barbara Sarafian as Gislene
- Michel van Dousselaere as Peer
- Monique van de Ven as Isabelle's mother

== Production ==
This is the second adaptation of a Tessa de Loo novel Sombogaart has directed following the 2002 Twin Sisters. He reunited with screenwriter Marieke van der Pol for the project. For the role as the kidnapped and held captive Isabelle, Reijn lost nine kilos (18lbs) by sticking to strict diet for nine weeks. During the nude filming, she struggled with keeping herself warm and described the overall experience as intense. Tineke Caels for her role as Jeanne had to be under make-up for two hours every day.

== Release ==
The film had its premiere on September 22 at the 31st edition of the Netherlands Film Festival and was released in Dutch theaters that same week.

== Reception ==
Isabelle received mixed-to-negative reviews from Dutch critics. Boyd van Hoeij writing for Variety described the critical and audience response as "tepid", one that is unlikely the find a significant audience.

Even thought her effort was commended by critics, Reijn was viewed as unsuited for the role, as she didn't fit conventional beauty standards. Despite this, Reijn was nominated for best Dutch actress for the role at the 2012 Rembrandt Awards.
