= Margarethe von Oven =

Secretary at the Bendlerblock during time of Valkyrie coup attempt

Margarethe von Oven

Margarethe von Oven (11 March 1904, Berlin – 5 February 1991, Göttingen) was a secretary in the Bendlerblock and an accomplice in the 20 July plot to assassinate Adolf Hitler.

== Early life ==
Margarethe's parents were Prussian nobility. Her father was Lieutenant Colonel Ludolf von Oven of the 115th Guards Infantry Regiment of the Grand Duchy of Hesse. Her father was killed on 22 August 1914 in the opening weeks of the First World War. Margarethe was raised with three siblings by her mother.

== Career ==
In 1920, Margarethe began work as a secretary in order to support her family financially. In 1925, she took a position as a secretary in the Defense Ministry and in 1928 she was sent to the military attaché's office in Moscow for six months, under an assumed name. She was on a secret mission at the time when the Reichswehr and Red Army were still collaborating. From 1930 to 1935 she worked in Berlin at the Reichswehr Ministry. In 1938 she moved to Budapest and in 1940 to Lisbon, as a secretary in the German military attaché office.

=== At the Bendlerblock ===
In her prewar Berlin days, Oven had worked as a secretary for Colonel General Kurt von Hammerstein-Equord and Colonel General Werner von Fritsch in the Bendlerblock headquarters of the Defense Ministry. In the summer of 1943, Major General Henning von Tresckow requested that she be transferred to his office, placing complete trust in her because she was his wife's best friend since childhood. Through her relationship with Tresckow, Oven was drawn into the preparations for the 20 July 1944 coup attempt against Hitler known as the 20 July Plot or the Valkyrie Conspiracy. When Tresckow was posted to the Eastern Front, Margarethe was reassigned as a secretary in the headquarters of Army Group Centre, serving as a news headline monitor for the Berlin coup plotters. She also typed the orders and decrees in preparation for the coup. During the summer and fall of 1943 she frequently met with Tresckow and Claus von Stauffenberg outside the Bendlerblock, in order to discuss and modify orders, and was fully aware of the plot.

=== Arrest ===
After the failure of the assassination attempt on 20 July 1944, Oven was arrested and held for two weeks, but after questioning she was allowed to return to her job at the Bendlerblock.

== Post-war ==
After the war, Margarethe von Oven worked for one year in Switzerland, then returned to Germany and worked as an assistant in a medical practice. In 1954, she was employed in the investment management office for Louis Ferdinand, Prince of Prussia, head of the House of Hohenzollern. In 1955, she married Wilfred Graf von Hardenberg, brother of Carl Hans Graf von Hardenberg, and lived in Göttingen until her death.

== Film portrayals ==
In the 2004 German production Stauffenberg, von Oven is portrayed by actress Stefania Rocca. In the 2008 film Valkyrie, starring Tom Cruise as Claus von Stauffenberg, she was portrayed by Dutch actress Halina Reijn.
