= Win/Win (film) =

2010 Dutch drama film

- Theatrical release poster
- Directed by: Jaap van Heusden
- Written by: Jaap van Heusden
- Produced by: Marc Bary
- Starring: Oscar Van Rompay; Leon Voorberg; Halina Reijn; Hans Kesting; Phi Nguyen; Pepijn Schoneveld
- Cinematography: Jan Moeskops
- Edited by: Jasper Quispel
- Music by: Minco Eggersman
- Production companies: IJswater Films; NPS
- Distributed by: Cinema Delicatessen
- Release date: 20 May 2010 (Netherlands)
- Running time: 85 minutes
- Country: Netherlands
- Languages: Dutch; English
- Budget: €780.000
- Box office: €23.000

Win/Win is a 2010 Dutch drama film written and directed by Jaap van Heusden in his directorial debut and it stars Oscar Van Rompay, Leon Voorberg, Halina Reijn, Hans Kesting, Phi Nguyen and Pepijn Schoneveld. Set in Amsterdam Zuidas during the 2008 financial crisis, it follows the Flemish Ivan, a rising star at an American investment bank, who starts losing control of his life despite winning at his job.

The film was first shown at IFFR and was later shown in Dutch theaters in May 2010. The film received generally positive reviews from critics and was nominated for a Golden Calf for Best Sound at the 2010 Netherlands Film Festival.

== Cast ==
- Oscar Van Rompay as Ivan
- Leon Voorberg as Stef
- Halina Reijn as Deniz
- Hans Kesting as Max
- Phi Nguyen as Paul
- Pepijn Schoneveld as Patrick

== Production ==
Win/Win, a Telefilm about the financial world was greenlit days after the Bankruptcy of Lehman Brothers for about €780,000. Production started a year later around Amsterdam-Zuidoost, where they also recreated a dealing room for a fictional investment bank. Flemish actor Oscar Van Rompay was cast in the lead role in his feature film debut, with supporting roles for Hans Kesting and Leon Voorberg. Halina Reijn would also join the cast, in the film she played receptionist Deniz.

== Release ==
Win/Win has had its premiere at IFFR, and was later shown in Dutch theaters on May 20, 2010. Win/Win would also been shown at 2010's Brooklyn Film Festival in June, at the Vancouver International Film Festival in October of the same year, and the International Filmfestival Mannheim-Heidelberg. At the latter it was one of the three films recommended by the exhibitors’ jury. On October 30, it was shown on television as part of Telefilm, an initiative to produce films for television.

=== Home media ===
The film was released on DVD by Filmfreak Distribution on November 15, 2010.

== Reception ==
The film received generally positive reviews from critics, who considered it a strong directorial debut for van Heusden. Filmkrant considered the film among the best of 2010.
