= Hein van der Heijden =

Dutch actor

Hein van der Heijden (born July 11, 1958 in Heerlen) is a Dutch stage, television and film actor.

== Career ==
In 1983, Hein finished the theatre school in Arnhem. With his graduation project he won the prize 'Friends of the theatre' for his role in a piece of Woody Allen. In 1989, Hein signed at Toneelgroep Amsterdam, until 2001, when he broke up with Toneelgroep Amsterdam to start a career as freelance actor.

In 2002, he had his musical debut in the musical "Frank Sinatra: That's life" as Frank Sinatra. In 2004, he played the role of Scar in the Dutch version of The Lion King (musical), for both roles he was nominated for the John Kraaijkamp Musical Awards. In 2007, Hein won the Arlecchino prize for his role in the stageplay "Mighty society 4". In 2012 he won the Louis d'Or for two roles.

== Stage and film career ==
- Hector, (1987) as Swa Ghijssels.
- Wij houden zo van Julio, (1990).
- De Brug, (1990) as Gijs Bardoel.
- Werther Nieland, (1991).
- Suite 215, (1992).
- Richting Engeland, (1993) as Jaap.
- Sneeuwval, (1993) as Jan.
- Lolamoviola: All Quiet, (1994).
- Oude tongen, (1994) as Theo Klein.
- Coverstory, (1993–1995) as Rudi Marks.
- Goede daden bij daglicht: Site by Site, (1996) as Pol.
- Naar de klote!, (1996)
- Consult, (1996).
- Baantjer, (1998)De Cock en de moord op de priester. as: Pater Frank.
- Quidam, Quidam, (1999) as Dr. Klinkelaar.
- Dalheim, (2000).
- Somberman's aktie, (2000) as Von Meijenveld.
- Wilhelmina, (2001) as Doenselaer.
- Meisje jongen ijsje, (2002).
- Russen, (2002) as Rudy.
- Bergen Binnen, (2003) as Bert.
- De Band, (2004) as Jeweler.
- Drijfzand, (2004)
- Keyzer en de Boer advocaten, (2005) as Mr. Glas.
- Koppels, (2006) as Mr. van Bijnem.
- Intensive Care, (2006) as Laurens van Nieuwenhuijzen.
- Spoorloos verdwenen, (2006) as Chris Koops.
- Grijpstra en de Gier, (2006) as Bart Schutter.
- Flikken Maastricht, (2007) as Arnold Schouten.
- De fuik, (2008) as Dominnee.
- Vuurzee, (2009) as Bol
- Witte vis, (2009)
- Lege maag, (2009)
- Terug naar de Kust, (2009)
- Sorry Minister, (2009)
- Den Uyl en de Lockhead affaire, (2010) as Dries van Agt (TV-series)
- Rundskop, (2011) as Renaat Maes
- Van god los, (2011) Jos (TV-series)
