= Hans Kesting =

Dutch actor (born 1960)

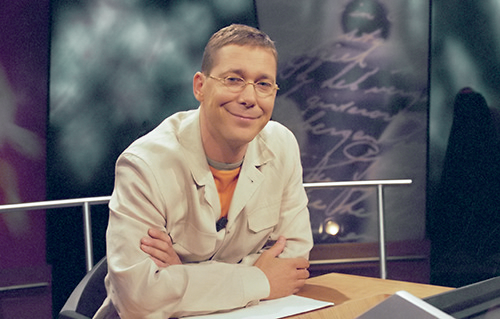
- Kesting in 1991
- Born: 6 October 1960 (age 65); Rotterdam, Netherlands
- Occupation: Actor

Hans Kesting (born 6 October 1960) is a Dutch actor. He has appeared in more than fifty films since 1987. He was diagnosed with HIV in 1996. In 2016, he was awarded the Louis d'Or.

== Selected filmography ==
Year	Title	Role	Notes
1989	De Kassière	Piccolo	
1990	Vincent & Theo	Andries Bonger	
1995	Aletta Jacobs: Het Hoogste Streven	Carel Victor Gerritsen	
1996	Punk Lawyer	Hanekroot	
1997	Character	Jan Maan	
2001	Miss Minoes	Harrie de Haringman	
2003	Young Kees	Meester	
2006	Nachtrit	Joris	
2007	Moordwijven	Evert-Jan Kroonenberg	
2007	Kapitein Rob en het Geheim van Professor Lupardi	Chef Commando’s	
2010	Sterke verhalen	Bartender	
2010	Win/Win	Max	
2011	Code Blue	Doctor	
2016	Moordvrouw		
2018	Niemand in de stad		
2020	Ares	Maurits Zwanenburg	

== Toneelgroep Amsterdam ==
- 1987 Tree from the tropics - Toneelgroep Amsterdam
- 1987 Ismene or the blinded tumbler - Toneelgroep Amsterdam
- 1987 Edward ll - Toneelgroep Amsterdam
- 1988 In the loneliness of the cotton fields- Toneelgroep Amsterdam
- 1988 Back in the desert- Toneelgroep Amsterdam
- 1990 Ballet - Toneelgroep Amsterdam
- 1992 The sequel- Toneelgroep Amsterdam
- 1993 Count your blessings - Toneelgroep Amsterdam
- 1993 Othello - Toneelgroep Amsterdam
- 1993 Glenn - Toneelgroep Amsterdam
- 1994 Richard lll - Toneelgroep Amsterdam
- 1994 Moonlight- Toneelgroep Amsterdam
- 1994 In the executive room- Toneelgroep Amsterdam
- 1995 Ecstacy - Toneelgroep Amsterdam
- 1995 Ivanov - Toneelgroep Amsterdam
- 1995 Raw food- Toneelgroep Amsterdam
- 1996 Prometheus - Toneelgroep Amsterdam
- 1996 Srebrenica! - Toneelgroep Amsterdam
- 1996 Spring wake up- Toneelgroep Amsterdam
- 1996 Light - Toneelgroep Amsterdam
- 1997 Crown year- Toneelgroep Amsterdam
- 1997 A kind of hades- Toneelgroep Amsterdam
- 1997 Her life, her death- Toneelgroep Amsterdam
- 1998 Herakles - Toneelgroep Amsterdam
- 1998 Delayed farewell- Toneelgroep Amsterdam
- 1998 Bakchanten - Toneelgroep Amsterdam
- 1999 Dark Lady - Toneelgroep Amsterdam
- 1999 Oom Wanja - Toneelgroep Amsterdam
- 1999 An ideal woman- Toneelgroep Amsterdam
- 1999 De Cid - Toneelgroep Amsterdam
- 2002 The night of the bonobos- Toneelgroep Amsterdam
- 2003-'14 Othello - Toneelgroep Amsterdam
- 2003 Three Sisters- Toneelgroep Amsterdam
- 2003-'14 Mourning becomes electra - Toneelgroep Amsterdam
- 2004 Romeo and Julia - Toneelgroep Amsterdam
- 2004-'06 Crusades - Toneelgroep Amsterdam
- 2005-'13 The taming of the shrew - Toneelgroep Amsterdam
- 2005-'08 Perfect Wedding - Toneelgroep Amsterdam
- 2006-'08 Oresteia - Toneelgroep Amsterdam
- 2007-17 Roman Tragedies - Toneelgroep Amsterdam
- 2007 Ajax - Toneelgroep Amsterdam
- 2008-'13 Angels in America - Toneelgroep Amsterdam
- 2008 Rocco and his brothers - Toneelgroep Amsterdam
- 2009'-'11 Antonioni Project - Toneelgroep Amsterdam
- 2010 Summer Trilogy - Toneelgroep Amsterdam
- 2010-'16 Opening Night -Toneelgroep Amsterdam
- 2010 Phaedra - Toneelgroep Amsterdam
- 2011-'12 Ghosts - Toneelgroep Amsterdam
- 2011-'14 The Russians! - Toneelgroep Amsterdam
- 2011-'14 The Miser - Toneelgroep Amsterdam
- 2012-'13 Husbands - Toneelgroep Amsterdam
- 2012-'13 Macbeth - Toneelgroep Amsterdam
- 2013-'14 The Seagull - Toneelgroep Amsterdam
- 2014 Danton's Death - Toneelgroep Amsterdam
- 2014-'17 The Fountainhead - Toneelgroep Amsterdam
- 2014 Mary Stuart - Toneelgroep Amsterdam
- 2015-'17 Kings of war - Toneelgroep Amsterdam
- 2016-'17 The kindly ones - Toneelgroep Amsterdam
- 2016-'17 The things that pass - Toneelgroep Amsterdam
- 2017 Ibsen House - Toneelgroep Amsterdam
- 2020 Who killed my father - Toneelgroep Amsterdam
