= Tjitske Reidinga =

Dutch actress and comedian

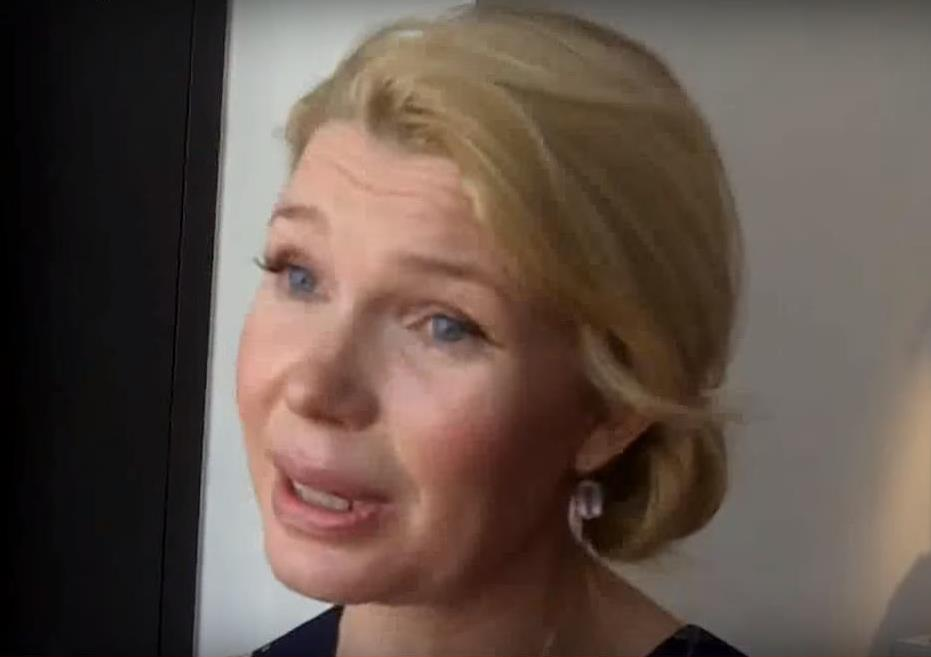
- Born: Tjitske Jacoba Reidinga; 20 February 1972 (age 54); Leeuwarden, Netherlands
- Occupations: Comedian, actress
- Years active: 1996–present
- Partner: Peter Blok
- Children: Foppe and Klaas (b. 2004)
- Awards: Colombina for Best Supporting Actress; 2002 Who's Afraid of Virginia Woolf?

Tjitske Jacoba Reidinga (born 20 February 1972) is a Dutch actress and comedian. Reidinga began her career on stage and acted in numerous plays. She won a Colombina award for her role in Who's Afraid of Virginia Woolf? in 2002. She made her screen debut in 1996. Her first major film role was as "Jet" in Ja Zuster, Nee Zuster (2002). She is probably known best for her role as 'Claire' in the successful Dutch series Gooische vrouwen.

== Early life ==
She was born in Leeuwarden, The Netherlands, but grew up in Africa. Her parents moved to Uganda shortly after they got together. Her father who had just graduated from Academie Minerva, an art school in Groningen, found a job at an advertising agency in Kampala. They moved back to the Netherlands to flee Idi Amin's reign of terror. Her mother was pregnant at the time, and a few months later she was born in the Frisian capital.

After she was born her parents wanted to go back to Africa, and the three went to Malawi where she lived until the age of 8. She remembered it as a beautiful country with a glittering lake (Lake Nyasa), where she could play freely. Her brother Hesling was born there and a few years later they returned to the Netherlands. She had a hard time trying to adjust herself to the cold and crowded country where she was born.

=== Becoming an actress ===
Ever since she was a little girl she knew she wanted to be an actress. Her parents had always fully supported their daughter's dream. Strengthened by her parents confidence, she never considered the possibility her dream wouldn't come true. If so she'd have quite a problem, having nothing in reserve. The only moment she had her doubts was at the academy. She noticed her teachers did not share her parents' trust. They had no idea what to make of her and as a result she had to do the year all over again. Though being very disappointed, she was strong an resilient and finally graduated in 1997. On her time at the Amsterdamse Toneelschool she commented: "Op de Toneelschool word je klaargestoomd om de keiharde praktijk aan te kunnen. Maar na m'n afstuderen heb ik de praktijk eigenlijk als een stuk makkelijker ervaren dan de opleiding." ("At the academy you are crammed for the real thing, but after I graduated I actually found my training a lot harder than acting as a job.")

== Career ==
=== Theatre ===
After her graduation she made a flashy start on stage at RO Theater, one of the major theatrical companies in the Netherlands, in the play "De ziekte die jeugd heet". Since then she has appeared in almost twenty different plays. One of those was 2001 production of Who's Afraid of Virginia Woolf? by Hummelinck Stuurman. For the latter she received a Colombina award for "Best Female Supporting Role" as child-wife Honey in 2002.

==== Theatre credits ====
Year	Title	Role	Director	Production company
1997	De ziekte die jeugd heet (The illness called youth)		Peter de Baan	Ro Theater
1998	Sterrenstof (Stardust)		Kim Zeegers	Spuitheater
1998	Trainspotting		Peter Pluymaekers	ZAP Productie
1999	Een stukje time out (A piece of time out)		Marije Gubbels	Fact
1999	Het vissenkind (The fish kid)		Judith de Rijke	Het Paleis
1999	Midzomernachtsdroom (A Midsummer Night's Dream)		Mark Rietman	Ro Theater
1999	Ja zuster, nee zuster (Yes nurse! no nurse!)	Jet	Pieter Kramer	Ro Theater
2000	Hollandse revue (Dutch revue)		Rieks Swarte	Spuitheater
2001	Trojaanse Vrouwen (The Trojan Women)		Mirjam Koen	Onafhankelijk Toneel
2001	Wie is er bang voor Virginia Woolf? (Who's Afraid of Virginia Woolf?)	Honey	Lodewijk de Boer	Hummelinck Stuurman
2002	Hedda Gabler	Hedda Gabler	Ivo van Hove	Trust
2003	Da Vinci en de drol (Da Vinci and the turd)		Jennifer Drabbe	Toneelschuur Haarlem
2003	Treinen kunnen keren (Trains can turn)	Fréderique	Mette Bouhuijs	Hummelinck Stuurman
2005	Amadeus	Constanze Weber	Matthijs Rümke	Bos Theaterproducties
2005	Uit liefde (Out of love)		Kees Hulst	Hummelinck Stuurman
2007	De geschiedenis van de familie Avenier (The history of the Avenier family)	Toos	Jaap Spijkers	Het Toneel Speelt
2009	De ingebeelde zieke (The Imaginary Invalid)	Béline	Jos Thie	DUS

=== Film ===
Her first role was a walk-on in the 1996 production De Zeemeerman. Later she appeared in a few more feature films such as "Ja Zuster, Nee Zuster" (2000 Pieter Kramer), "Young Kees" (2003 André van Duren), "Father's Affair" (2003 Maarten Treurniet) and "Ellis in Glamourland" (2004 Pieter Kramer).

==== Film credits ====
Year	Title	International Title	Rolewest
1996	De zeemeerman		Emily
2002	Ja zuster, nee zuster	Yes Nurse! No Nurse!	Jet
2003	Sale		Woman in mall
2003	Kees de jongen	Young Kees	Juffrouw Dubois
2003	De Passievrucht	Father's Affair	Anke Neerinckx
2004	Ellis in glamourland	Alice in Glamourland	Roosje
2005	Geluk		Jackie
2006	'n Beetje verliefd	Happy Family	Aafke
2011	Gooische Vrouwen		Claire van Kampen
2012	De Verbouwing	The Renovation	Tessa van Asselt
2014	Gooische Vrouwen 2		Claire van Kampen
2016	De Zevende Hemel		Silke
2019	April, May en June		June

=== Television ===
She is seen weekly in Children's television series Klokhuis (NPS) as "prinsesje Petronella", as well as "dochter konijn" ("daughter rabbit" -being the daughter of mother rabbit (Loes Luca). She also seen in "FIT" (IDTV), "Spangen", "Ibbeltje" (BOS BROS), "De Band" (VARA) and "Keyzer en de Boer Advocaten" (NCRV/KRO). She is without a doubt best known for her starring role in the successful television series "Gooische Vrouwen" (Endemol).

==== Television credits ====
Year	Title	Role	Notes
1998	Goede daden bij daglicht:Zwerfvuil	Sylvia	
1998	Baantjer	Puck Geldermans	De Cock en de XTC-moord (13 March 1998)
2002	De vloer op	Various	
2004	De Band	Belinda	De Code (25 February 2004) Hormonen (17 March 2004)
2004	FIT	Various	10 episodes
2004	Ibbeltje	Mientje	
2005	Keyzer & De Boer Advocaten	Linda	Waar rook is, is vuur (10 October 2005)
2005	Gooische vrouwen	Claire van Kampen	24 episodes (First 30 October 2005) (running)
2006	Klokhuis	Prinsesje Petronella, dochter konijn	Training vredesmissie (20 December 2006); Portretschilderen (12 April 2007)
2007	Allemaal film	Self	De magie van het witte doek

== Personal life ==
Reidinga was married to actor Vincent Croiset for six years. Together they have three sons. In March 2014 it was announced that she had started a relationship with colleague Peter Blok. They met each other during the filming of De verbouwing. They got married in 2021.

Awards
Preceded by Margot Ros	Colombina for Best Supporting Actress; 2002	Succeeded by Carice van Houten
