= Maarten Treurniet =

Dutch film director (born 1959)

Maarten Treurniet (born 21 January 1959) is a Dutch film director.

== Biography ==
Treurniet was born in Amsterdam, the Netherlands. He moved to Dwingeloo in 1959 and went to High school in Assen from 1971 until 1977. After high school he returned to Amsterdam and studied chemistry at the University of Amsterdam from 1978 until 1980. After chemistry he studied electronics at the Higher Technical College (H.T.S.). During his electronics study he started doing the sound effects and other sound technical things for a theater group 'Orkater' and he did production of various CDs and LPs. Finally after his studies he went to the Amsterdam College of Arts faculty Film and Television from 1986 until 1990. During his time in the Amsterdam College of Arts faculty Film and Television he directed a Sunday morning show for VPRO, directed and made the scenario for de Nachtwacht (six minutes) and de Dochter van de Nacht (20 minutes), he helped with the direction of a play called Parking by Olga Zuiderhoek and Loes Luca and he did the screenplay and directed a graduation film Het Nadeel van de Twijfel. In 1990 he earned a degree for directing, editing, camera and sound at the faculty Film and Television.

After all of his studies, he did many small projects like short movies and commercials. Later he started making bigger things like series and movies. His work won many prizes. One of the highlights was in 2000. He got a golden 'Fipa' for best actress in Biarritz (France) Film Fesltival, the Juryprice and Best Scenario at the Film Festival d'Amour in Mons (Belgium), a Bronze 'Rosa Camuna' at the Bergamo Film Festival (Italy), the VFF TV-movie Award for Best International Film at the Munich Film Festival (Germany) and Best Actress, Prix de la Jeunesse and the Grand Prix from Genève at Cinema Tout Ecran (film festival in Geneva). Lately he made a big movie titled De Heineken Ontvoering (also known as The Heineken Kidnapping). Now Maarten is still working. He is engaged to Marnie Blok and has two children: a boy (Milan) and a girl (Tess).

== Filmography ==
year	film	notes
1990	Het Nadeel van de Twijfel	He directed this graduation film, it was nominated for the Golden Calf (award).
1990–1991	various short films	Made for Production People B.V.
1991	Lekker Groeien	He directed this short film made for Stichting Nationale Boomfesstdagen, it has won the Holland Film Award, first prize EKO-film festival Czechoslovakia, First prize Bundes Verband Jugend und Film Germany and Recognition of Excellence in Children's Media on the Chicago International Children's Film Festival.
1991	Sjans	He directed this 26-part comedy sitcom.
1992–1994	Pleidooi (Called to the Bar)	He directed this drama series for ID-TV Productions and AVRO Dutch Public Television. It has won a Golden Calf (award) for best direction of television drama, the jury-price of the Nipkow Foundation of television critics and a Silver Award at the festival of New York.
1994	various short films	Made for Production People and IBP.
1996	Zwarte Sneeuw (Black Snow)	He directed this 12-part series made for NCRV Dutch Public Television. It has won a Dutch Adacamy Award for best actrice and best drama.
1997	Zonder Zelda	He directed this movie(written by Mieke de Jong) commissioned by the NPS Dutch Public Television. Nominated for the Golden Calf (award) for best television drama.
1997	Various commercials	For Amstel Beer, Unilever, Volkswagen, Peugeot and most of the Dutch insurance companies.
1998	Het Glinsterend Pantser	He directed this movie(based on the book written by Simon Vestdijk). It was made for Hungry Eye Features commissioned by the omroepvereniging VARA.
1999	Het Paradijs (Paradise)	He directed this movie for the NPS Dutch Public Television. It was nominated for the Golden Calf for best actrice and best actor. And won the Audience Award and Best Actress on the Williamsburg Brooklyn Film Festival in New York.
2003	Father's Affair	He directed this movie for the production company 25fps and VARA television. It was nominated for the Golden Calf for Best Movie, Best Actress and Best Sound and it has won the Golden Calf in the category Best Sound. It has won a Golden Film Award for more than 100.000 visitors.
2004	Birth of the Western	He directed this short film for the producer IJswater Film.
2006	De Heineken Ontvoering	He wrote the scenario for IDtv-film.
2007–2008	Lijn 32	He wrote the eight-part scenario for the KRO and the NCRV.
2009–2010	Lijn 32	He directed the series for KRO and NCRV commissioned by IDtv-film.
2011	De Heineken Ontvoering	He directed this film.
