= Henny Orri =

Dutch actress (1925–2022)

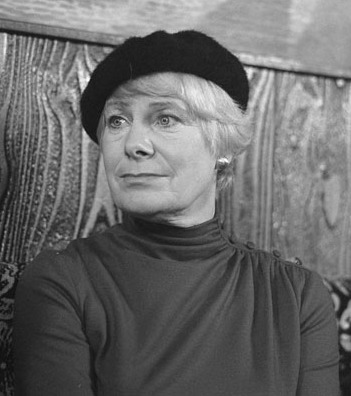
- Born: Henriëtte Josephine Orri; 16 June 1925; Amsterdam, Netherlands
- Died: 4 January 2022 (aged 96); Amsterdam, Netherlands
- Occupation: Actress

Henriëtte Josephine Orri (5 June 1925 – 4 January 2022) was a Dutch actress.

== Life and career ==
Born in Amsterdam, Orri studied at the Amsterdam Drama School, graduating in 1947. She mainly worked in theatre, as a member of numerous stage companies, and in 1986 was awarded a Theo d'Or for her performance in Arthur Kopit's Wings. She also appeared in films and television works.

Orri was married two times, the first with Ton Lensink, with whom she had a daughter, Diane Lensink, who was also an actress and who died of cancer in 2012. She later remarried to the playwright and stage director Theo Kling, with whom she often collaborated.

Orri officially retired in 1996, but nevertheless continued to appear on stage until 2006. In 2015 she received a Blijvend Applaus Prijs for her career. She died in Amsterdam on 4 January 2022, at the age of 96.

== Filmography ==
Year	Title	Role	Notes
1970	Puppet on a Chain	Herta	
1975	Dokter Pulder zaait papavers	Lieske Pulder	
1983	Vroeger kon je lachen		
2004	Verborgen gebreken	Agnes Stam	(final film role)
