= Vereniging van Schouwburg- en Concertgebouwdirecties =

Dutch Trade association

The Association of Theater and Concert Hall Directors (Dutch: Vereniging van Schouwburg- en Concertgebouwdirecties) in short VSCD is a Dutch association founded in 1955.

It presents many awards, including the theater awards Louis d'Or, Theo d'Or, Arlecchino, and Colombina.
