= Boy 7 =

Boy 7 may refer to:

- Boy 7 (novel), 2009 novel by Mirjam Mous
- Boy 7 (2015 Dutch film), 2015 film based on the novel
- Boy 7 (2015 German film), 2015 film based on the novel
