= Maastricht Academy of Dramatic Arts =

Dutch performing arts institute

Coordinates: 50.84647°N 5.68842°E

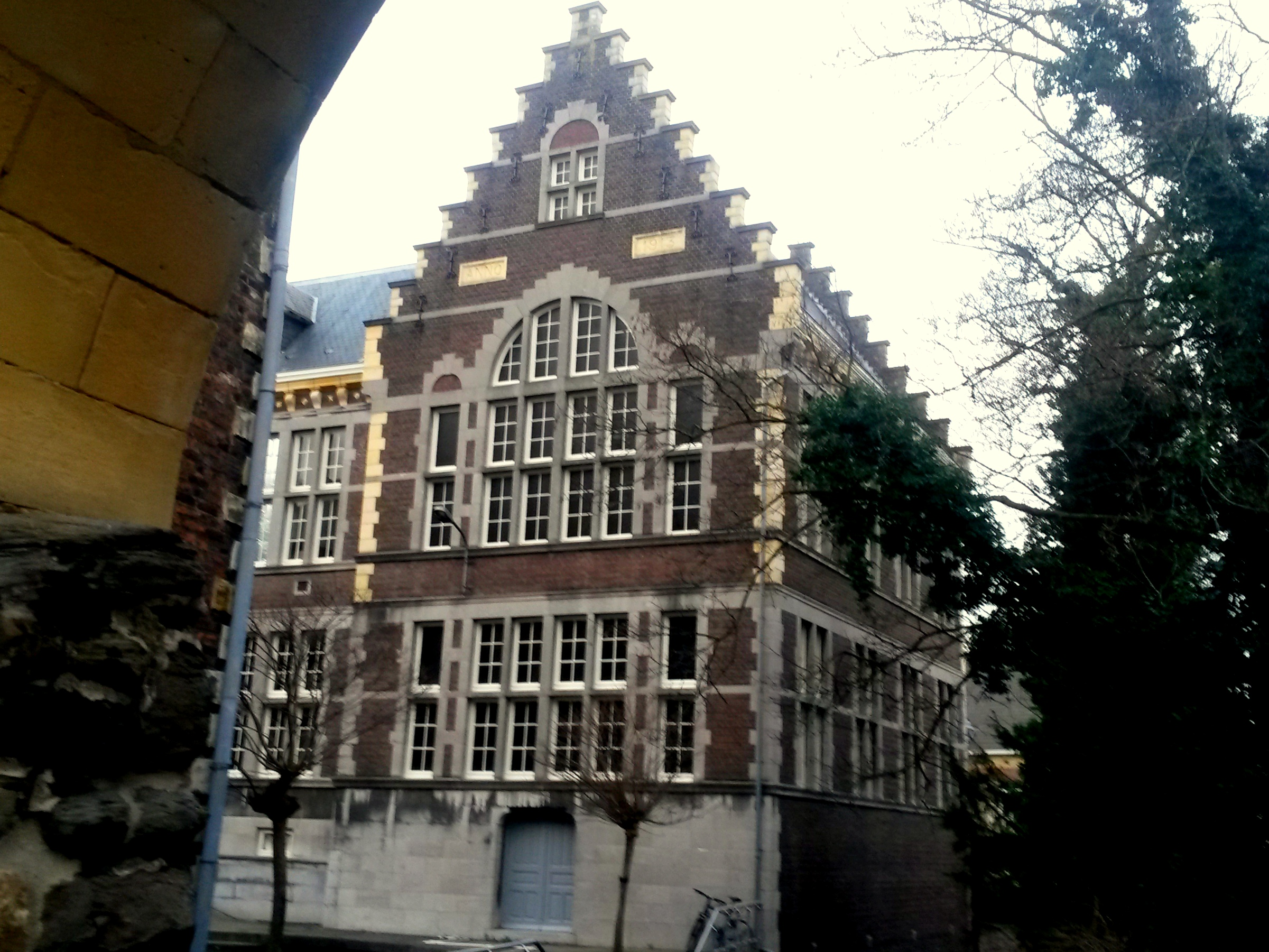
Maastricht Academy of Dramatic Arts seen from Looiersgracht

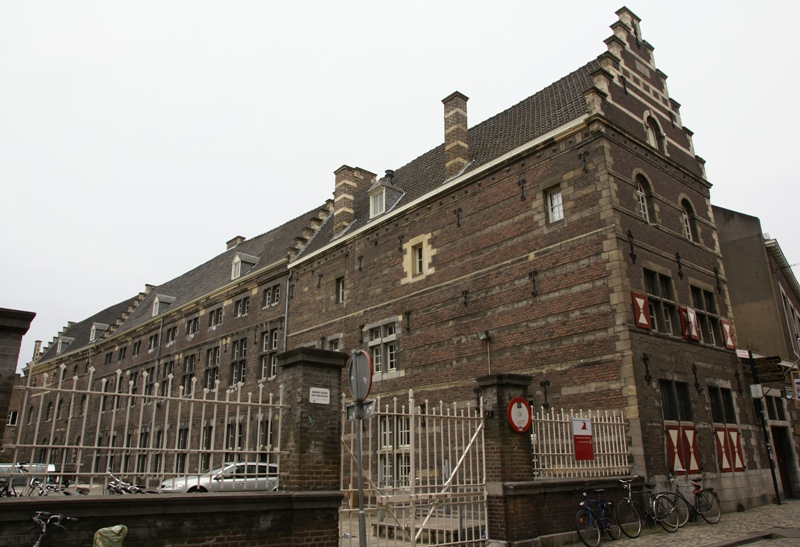
Toneelacademie, Maastricht

The Toneelacademie Maastricht, or Maastricht Academy of Dramatic Arts, is a college of dramatic arts located in the city of Maastricht in the Netherlands. It is part of the Zuyd University of Applied Sciences.

== Programmes ==
The training found at the various academies of dramatic arts in the Netherlands comes under the heading Hoger Beroepsonderwijs (HBO), meaning Higher Professional Education. The Toneelacademie Maastricht, institute of performative arts, offers a 4-year Bachelor's programme and a 2-year postgraduate programme leading to a master's degree.

== Description ==
The academy is part of Zuyd University. The drama school is housed in a former Protestant orphanage in the historic Jekerkwartier in Maastricht.

== Reputation and alumni ==
The Toneelacademie Maastricht, institute of performative arts has a solid reputation in the Netherlands. Many famous Dutch and Flemish theatre and film actors and directors, playwrights, scenographers, costume designers, and performers were educated there, including:

- Bram Bart
- Peter Blok
- Emmanuel Ohene Boafo
- Pierre Bokma
- Elsie de Brauw
- Maxime De Winne
- Tijn Docter
- Maria Goos
- Boris van der Ham
- Olivier Herter
- Sylvia Hoeks
- Isa Hoes
- Carice van Houten
- Fedja van Huêt
- Gaite Jansen
- Ad van Kempen
- Marwan Kenzari
- Hans Kesting
- Melody Klaver
- Martijn Lakemeier
- Sylvia Millecam
- Jérôme Reehuis
- Halina Reijn
- Matthijs van de Sande Bakhuyzen
- Willem van de Sande Bakhuyzen
- Ariane Schluter
- Gijs Scholten van Aschat
- Daan Schuurmans
- Johan Simons (also as a professor)
- Huub Stapel
- Monique van de Ven
- Dolf de Vries
- Jeroen Willems

== See also ==
- Zuyd University
  - Maastricht Academy of Fine Arts
  - Maastricht Academy of Music
- Maastricht University
- Erasmus programme
- European Credit Transfer System (ECTS)
- European Higher Education Area
