= Bloedbroeders =

2008 television film directed by Arno Dierickx

- Also known as: Blood Brothers
- Written by: Bert Bouma; Jan Bernard Bussemaker
- Directed by: Arno Dierickx
- Starring: Erik van Heijningen; Matthijs van de Sande Bakhuyzen; Sander van Amsterdam; Derk Stenvers; Carolien Spoor
- Theme music composer: Johan Hoogewijs
- Country of origin: Netherlands
- Original language: Dutch

Production
- Producers: Reinier Selen; Edwin van Meurs
- Editor: Wouter Jansen
- Running time: 90 minutes

Original release
- Release: 10 January 2008

Blood Brothers (Dutch: Bloedbroeders) is a 2008 Dutch television film directed by Arno Dierickx.

The film is based on the Baarn murder case, which took place between 1960 and 1963. The then 17-year-old Boudewijn Henny, his 15-year-old brother Ewout Henny and their 16-year-old friend Hennie Werkhoven killed the 14-year-old Theo Mastwijk in Soest.

== Plot ==
Simon is a high school student who always gets high grades. He isn't popular and spends his free time doing his home work and helping his mother. One day, he is in a store buying an LP album for his mother and runs into the popular brothers, Arnout and Victor van Riebeeck.

Arnout and Victor are the sons of a very wealthy man and like to make trouble. Arnout is trying to steal an LP album, but gets caught by the store clerk. He shoves the LP album into Simon's hands to stay out of trouble and it seems to work. Eventually, Simon steals the LP album for the boys. Outside, they get to know each other better.

They are interrupted by Ronnie, a high school drop-out and bully. He breaks Simon's LP album. Simon is too afraid to stand up for himself, so it is Arnout who helps Simon out. They get acquainted with Ronnie and they all eventually get into trouble when Ronnie steals a motorbike.

The owner of the motorbike calls the police who then try to arrest Ronnie. He gets away and decides to crash in the attic of the Van Riebeeck house. The boys decide to help him out, without Arnout and Victor's parents or the maids and other house staff, finding out.

Nothing seems to go wrong and Simon has the time of his life hanging out with Arnout and Victor at their enormous mansion. Simon is especially interested in Arnout's girlfriend, Frederique. Arnout isn't really interested in her and tells Simon he can have her. Simon tries to make a move, but Frederique isn't interested in him in a romantic way.

Meanwhile, Ronnie becomes more of a problem. He starts to demand stuff. The boys try to force him to go away, but Ronnie threatens to tell the police that they helped him steal the motorbike, if he gets busted. Before Arnout and Victor are about to go on vacation, they know it is time for Ronnie to leave. The boys try everything to get Ronnie out of the house, including making a fake passport and convincing him to leave the country. But nothing seems to work and the boys see only one solution: Murder.

They try to poison his drink, but it goes wrong. They plan on strangling him with a cord. Victor is supposed to be on the look out, while Arnout and Simon are strangling him. When Arnout chickens out, Simon decides to do it alone. He tries to choke him, but Ronnie is stronger and pushes him away before he tries to run from them. Afraid that Ronnie will tell someone, Arnout runs after him and hits him in the head with an axe.

They bury him and a few days later Arnout and Victor are about to go on vacation. Arnout tells Simon that a lot has happened in the past few weeks and it is better for them not to see each other. The movie finally ends with intertitles, saying the boys got arrested and went into TBS. Arnout and Victor are now free and took over their father's business. They now become two of the richest men in the Netherlands, while Simon is forgotten.

== Cast ==
- Erik van Heijningen - Simon Bakker
- Matthijs van de Sande Bakhuyzen - Arnout van Riebeeck
- Sander van Amsterdam - Ronnie Fennis
- Derk Stenvers - Victor van Riebeeck
- Carolien Spoor - Frederique
- Pierre Bokma - Father van Riebeeck
- Betty Schuurman - Mother van Riebeeck
- Dimme Treurniet - Father Bakker
- Marthe Geke Bracht - Mother Bakker
- Daan van Dijsseldonk - Diederick van Riebeeck

== Realities content ==
The body of Theo Mastwijk was coincidentally discovered by a staff member of the mansion on Friday 27 October 1961. His body was found in a pit meant as a septic tank. His body was covered with whitewash and after investigation, he was affirmed to be killed in June 1960.

The murder case was being talked about all over the country, because the murderers were rich kids. Boudewijn and Ewout were the sons of the director of an insurance company. Boudewijn later escaped from jail, but later was caught again.

Boudewijn (Arnout in the film) and Hennie Werkhoven (Simon in the film) were convicted to nine years of jail in 1963. The judge thought Ewout (Victor in the film) was involved with the murder as well and was sent to jail for six years.

The makers of the film never studied the files related to the real murder case and the written script was fictional. The character of Frederique never existed, for instance.
