= Tijn Docter =

Dutch actor (born 1972)

Docter (2011) -interviews in Dutch

Tijn Docter (born 25 April 1972 in Amsterdam) is a Dutch actor.

After graduating from Toneelacademie (Academy of Dramatic Arts) in Maastricht he played in various Dutch films. He played in 06/05 (2005) directed by Theo van Gogh, Zus & Zo by Paula van der Oest and Loverboy (2003) by Lodewijk Crijns. He was directed by Nicole van Kilsdonk for the films Johan (2005) and Bruno & Violet (2002, KRO). In 2006 Tijn starred in De Uitverkorene by Theu Boermans and he played the main character Giph in the film Ik Omhels Je Met 1000 Armen directed by Willem van de Sande Bakhuyzen. Tijn not only acts in films, but also for TV series and in theaters.
