= Family (2001 Dutch film) =

2001 film by Willem van de Sande Bakhuyzen

- Theatrical release poster
- Based on: Family by Maria Goos
- Written by: Maria Goos
- Directed by: Willem van de Sande Bakhuyzen
- Starring: Petra Laseur; Marisa van Eyle
- Music by: Fons Merkies
- Country of origin: Netherlands
- Original language: Dutch

Production
- Producers: Hanneke Niens; Anton Smit
- Cinematography: Remco Bakker
- Editor: Wouter Jansen
- Running time: 91 minutes
- Production company: IDTV

Original release
- Release: 13 December 2001

Family (Dutch: Familie) is a 2001 Dutch drama film directed by Willem van de Sande Bakhuyzen and written by Maria Goos based on the play of the same name and starring Petra Laseur, Marisa van Eyle, Bram van der Vlugt, Anneke Blok, and Mark Rietman.

The movie was first shown at the 2001's Netherlands Film Festival, where it won the Golden Calf for best television drama. This was followed up by a release in Dutch theaters distributed by C-Films in December.

== Cast ==
- Petra Laseur as Els
- Marisa van Eyle as Bibi
- Bram van der Vlugt as Jan
- Anneke Blok as Sandra
- Mark Rietman as Nico
- Bart Klever as Von
- R. Kan Albay as Theofanis Gekas
