= Özgür Yıldırım =

German-Turkish film director

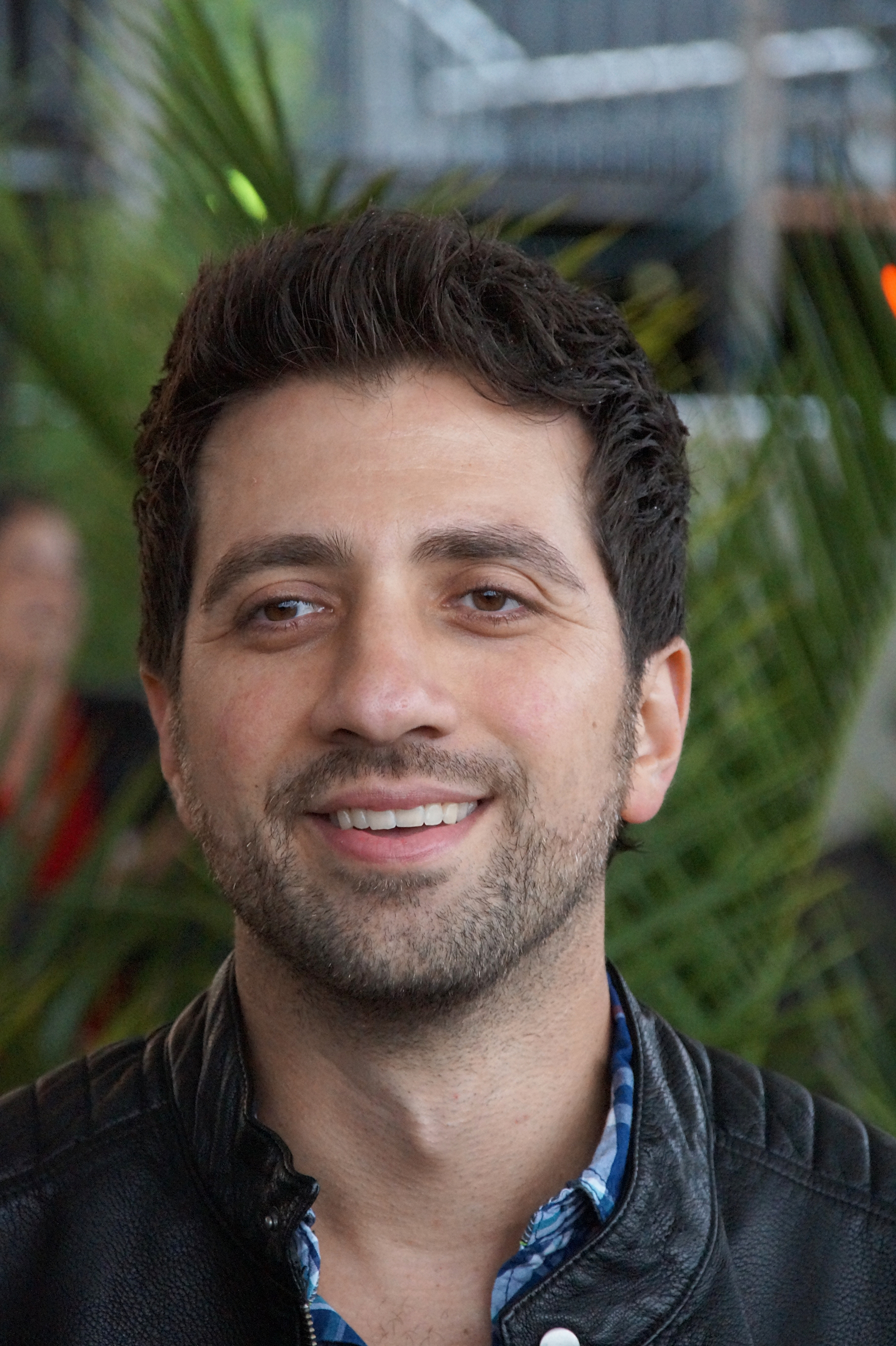
Özgür Yildirim at the German premier of Boy7 in Düsseldorf on 16 August 2015.

Özgür Yıldırım (born 12 September 1979, Dulsberg, West Germany) is a German-Turkish film director.

== Life and career ==
Yıldırım was born into a family of Turkish Gastarbeiter (guest workers.) At the age of 11, he began to write stories and at the age of 14, he published his first book: the horror novel Graue Nächte (1993).

After graduating from gymnasium, Yıldırım studied at the Hamburg Media School.

His first short films led Fatih Akın to call him "the most talented German young director", especially due to his 2004 short film Alım Market.

In 2007, he shot his first feature film, Chiko. He was also the screenwriter, for which he received the screenplay award at the Lübeck Nordic Film Days in 2008. The film premiered at the Berlinale 2008 and a year later, was nominated for the Deutscher Filmpreis in four categories, including Best Feature Film. Yıldırım himself was again awarded a prize for his screenplay.

In 2011, he shot the feature film Blutzbrüdaz with rapper Sido in the lead role and also took part in screenwriting. In Germany, Blutzbrüdaz had, after the first weekend, 128,139 attendants, with 528,834 watching the film overally.

In the year 2013, he directed the NDR crime show Tatort: Feuerteufel in Hamburg with Wotan Wilke Möhring as producer. The first broadcast was on April 28, 2013, and reached 10 million viewers in Germany. The press judged the film and the new team mainly positively. A partial "illogical plot" was criticized, which still leaves air for future consequences. In March 2016, his second crime show, Tatort: Zorn Gottes, was broadcast.

In August 2015, Yıldırım's third feature film, Boy 7, based on the novel of the same name by Mirjam Mous, and starring David Kross and Emilia Schüle, premiered in German cinemas.

== Filmography ==
Short films

- 2002: Der nötige Schneid
- 2003: Liebe auf türkisch
- 2004: Alim Market

Feature films

- 2008: Chiko
- 2011: Blutzbrüdaz
- 2013: Tatort: Feuerteufel
- 2015: Boy 7
- 2016: Tatort: Zorn Gottes
- 2017: Only God Can Judge Me
