= Huis Soiron =

Coordinates: 50°51′01″N 5°41′10″E

House of Soiron
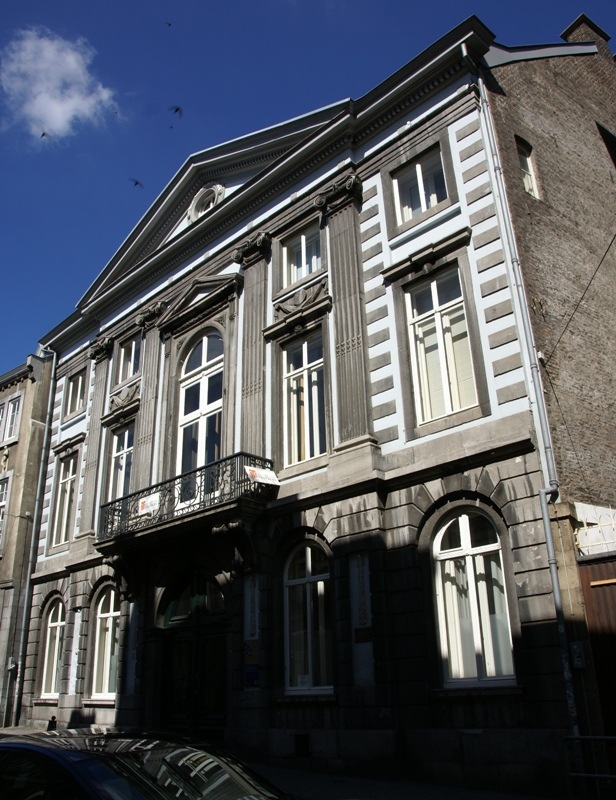

General information
- Address: Maastricht-Statenkwartier, Grote Gracht 82
- Owner: Maastricht University

Design and construction
- Architect(s): Mathias Soiron
- Designations: Dutch rijksmonument #27014

Huis Soiron is a former canon house in the center of the Dutch city of Maastricht. It is located at Grote Gracht 82 in the central neighborhood Statenkwartier and as of 2004 is owned by Maastricht University, which also occupies several nearby properties, including the Hof van Tilly. The building from the late 18th century possesses a number of rooms with lavish stucco work in Louis XVI style and has been a national monument since 1966.

== History ==
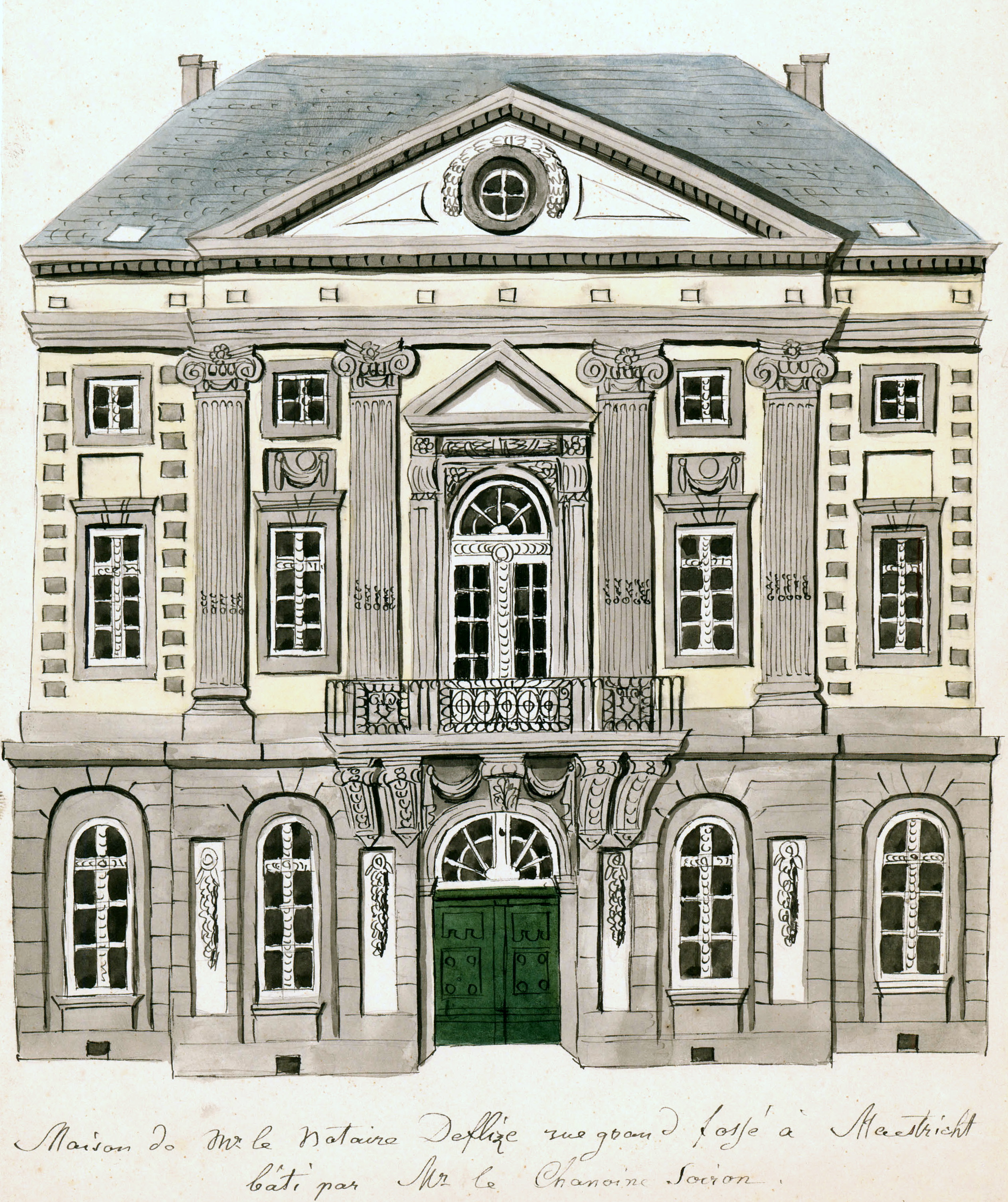
Coloured drawing by Philippe van Gulpen of House Soiron in Grote Gracht in Maastricht, Netherlands.

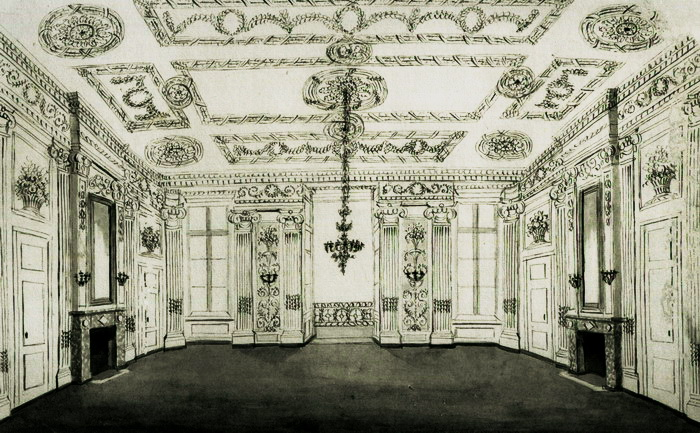
Maastricht, the Netherlands. Interior of the main salon of the Soiron mansion on Grote Gracht. Drawing by Philippus van Gulpen, c 1840.

The House of Soiron was built on a plot on the Grote Gracht where the House of Cumberland had previously stood, formerly known as Poort van Thisius. This gate house was owned by the Protestant magistrate family Thisius until the end of the 17th century, after which it passed to the Van Buren family in 1697. The name House of Cumberland is derived from William of Cumberland, son of King George II of Great Britain and third Duke of Cumberland. Cumberland was one of the leading field men in the battle of Lauffeld (near Maastricht) during the War of the Austrian Succession in 1747. He probably occupied the house at the time, and was a member of the family.

In October 1785, the dilapidated building was purchased by the wealthy Andreas Joseph Soiron (André) and his brother Wilhelmus Martinus (Guillaume), both canons of the Chapter of Saint Servatius. They commissioned their brother Mathias Soiron, city architect of Maastricht, to design a city palace to replace the old house. The floor plan of the new house reflects the traditional layout of a townhouse in the Prince-Bishopric of Liège: the living quarters are located to the left of the passageway; the staircase and service quarters are to the right. The late-classic façade and sumptuous interior showcase the wealth and prestige of the two brothers. Less than ten years after the completion of the canon house, the power of the St. Servaas chapter, which formed a near-separate state within the city of Maastricht, was over. After the French conquered Maastricht in 1794, the chapter lost all of its privileges and possessions, and was disbanded in 1797.

The Soiron brothers refused to take the oath of hatred for kingship and anarchy demanded by the French and were therefore exiled to the penal colony of Cayenne in French Guiana together with the provost of Saint Servatius, Thomas Jacob van Wassenaer. Through the intervention of the French-minded lawyer and representative of the people, Charles Clément Roemers, this could be prevented and the Soirons were allowed to serve their sentence in Compiègne. After the Concordat of 15 July 1801 they returned home, but the premises on the Grote Gracht had meanwhile passed into other hands. In 1825 the tax collector and town councillor E.H. Ruys lived here. Around 1840 the notary Deflize lived there.

Later, members of the Regout family of industrialists lived there: from about 1852 Edouard Regout with his wife and eleven children; then his son Joseph with his wife and thirteen children. In 1920, the family sold the house to the insurance bank 'De Maas'. In 1962, the city of Maastricht bought it for the Finance Department. In that year, the building was extensively photographed for the Rijksdienst voor de Monumentenzorg, now the Rijksdienst voor het Cultureel Erfgoed (see images "Ornamental stucco work large salon"). Four years later the building was listed.

In 1987 the building was given an educational purpose, first for the Rijkshogeschool Opleiding Tolk-Vertaler (now Zuyd University of Applied Sciences), which had a new wing built at the rear in 1989. In 1999 Maastricht University bought Huis Soiron. Since 2004 it has been home to the Faculty of Arts and Social Sciences (FASoS). In 2003 the university acquired the adjoining property Hof van Tilly, which was connected to the House of Soiron. Meanwhile, the so-called Ursuline Schools are also owned by the university, creating a second campus in this part of the inner city, next to the Jeker Quarter.

== Description ==
=== Exterior ===
The Soiron House has the appearance of a townhouse (French: hôtel particulier) due to its broad, stately façade on the Grote Gracht. The building is five bays wide and three stories high. The façade has a central avant-corps with fluted ionic pilasters and a crowning pediment. The first floor of the façade is of brick with blockwork, with round-arched windows and in the middle a round-arched carriage gate. Above the gate, on sculpted brackets, there is a balcony with a wrought iron fence with geometric ornaments. Above the balcony doors is a smaller pediment. On either side of the balcony are rectangular windows, four high on the second floor and four low on the second. There are festoons between the windows of the avant-corps.

=== Interior ===
The interior of the Canon House is divided in two by a passageway located behind the entrance gate, intended for horse-drawn carriages. On the right side of this passage is the original 18th-century oak staircase with carved banister. The passageway currently serves as a hallway and is decorated with stucco pilasters. Several rooms on the first floor possess ceilings, walls and mantelpieces with decorative stucco in Louis XVI style.

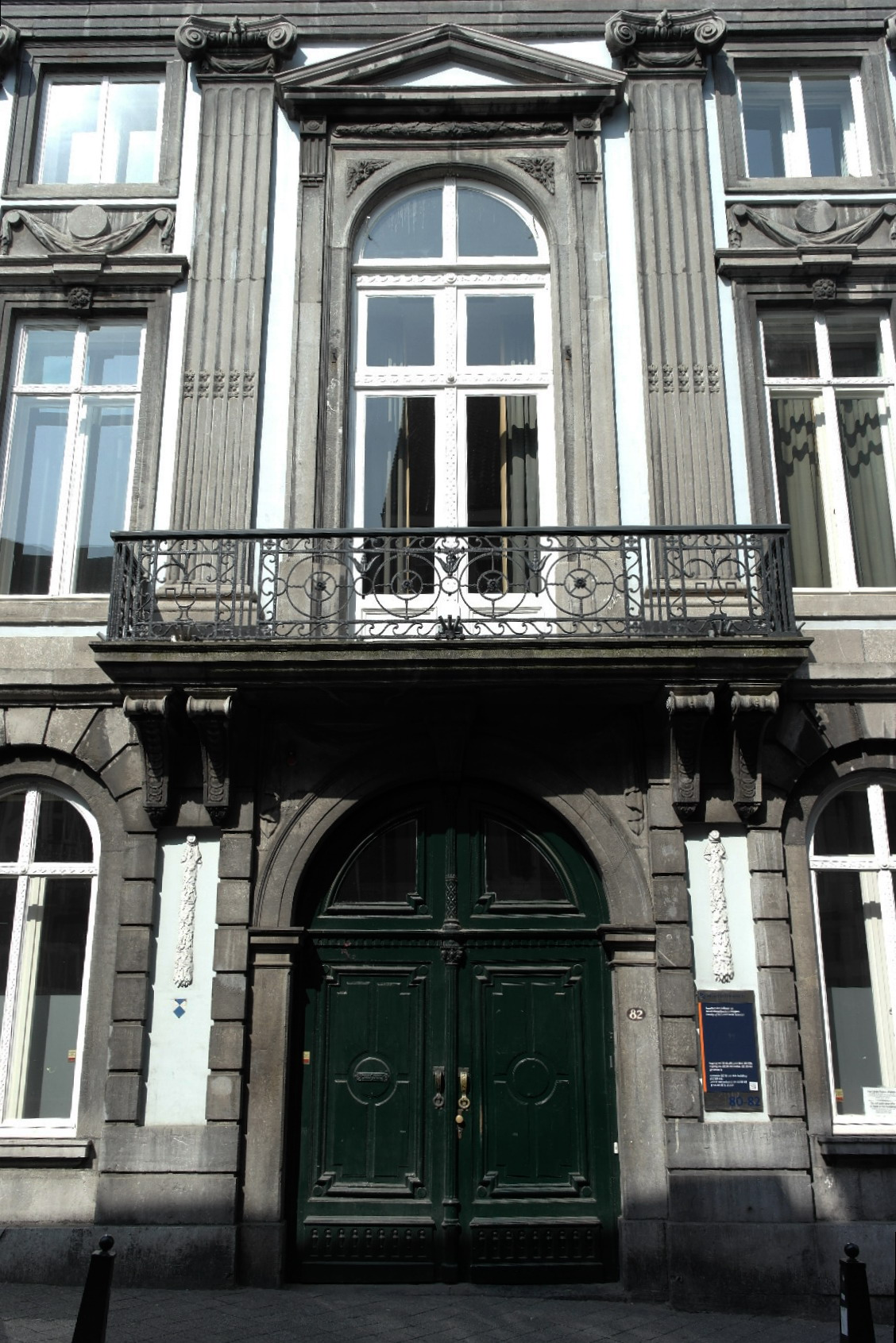
Details of the façade

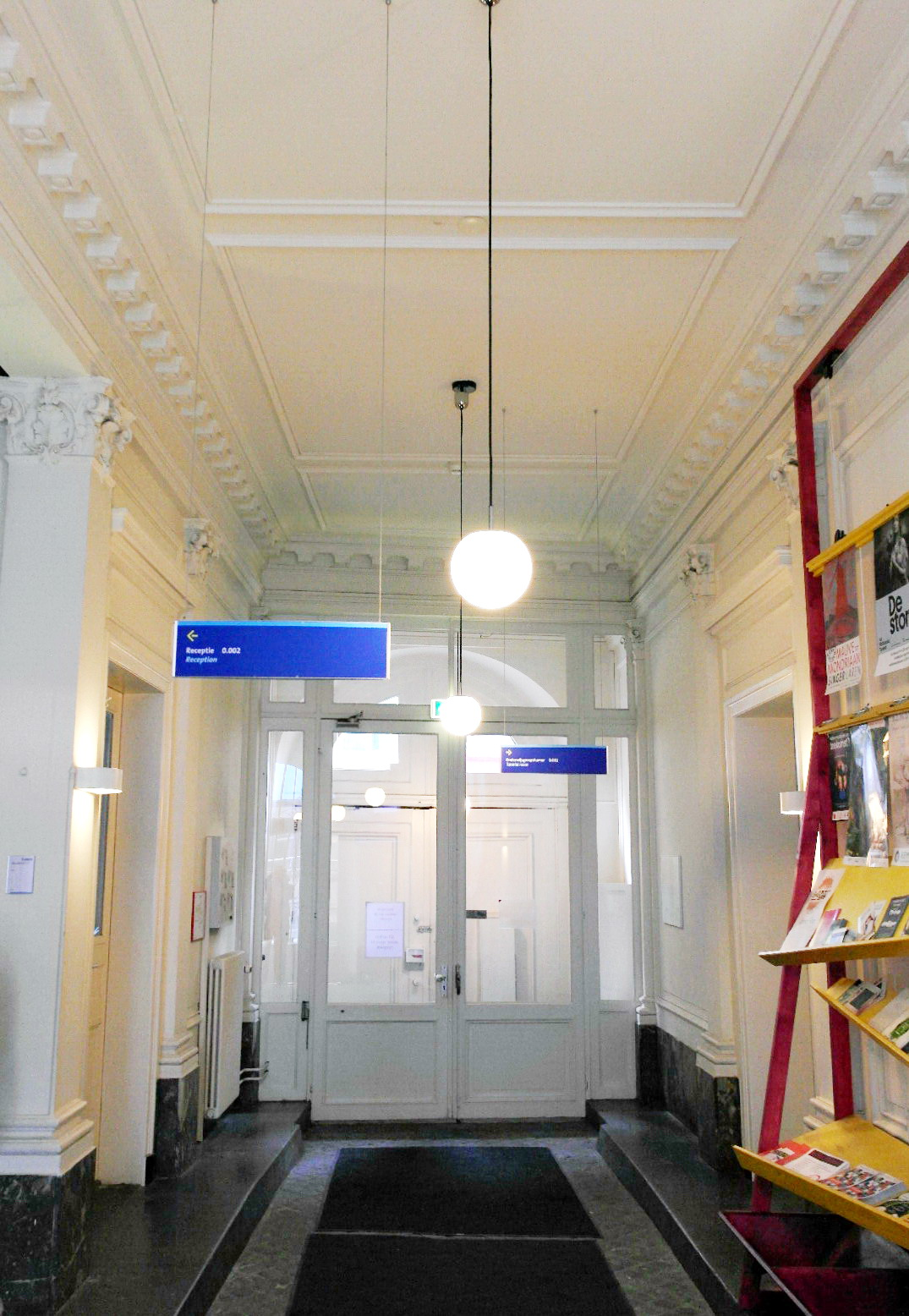
Hallway ground floor

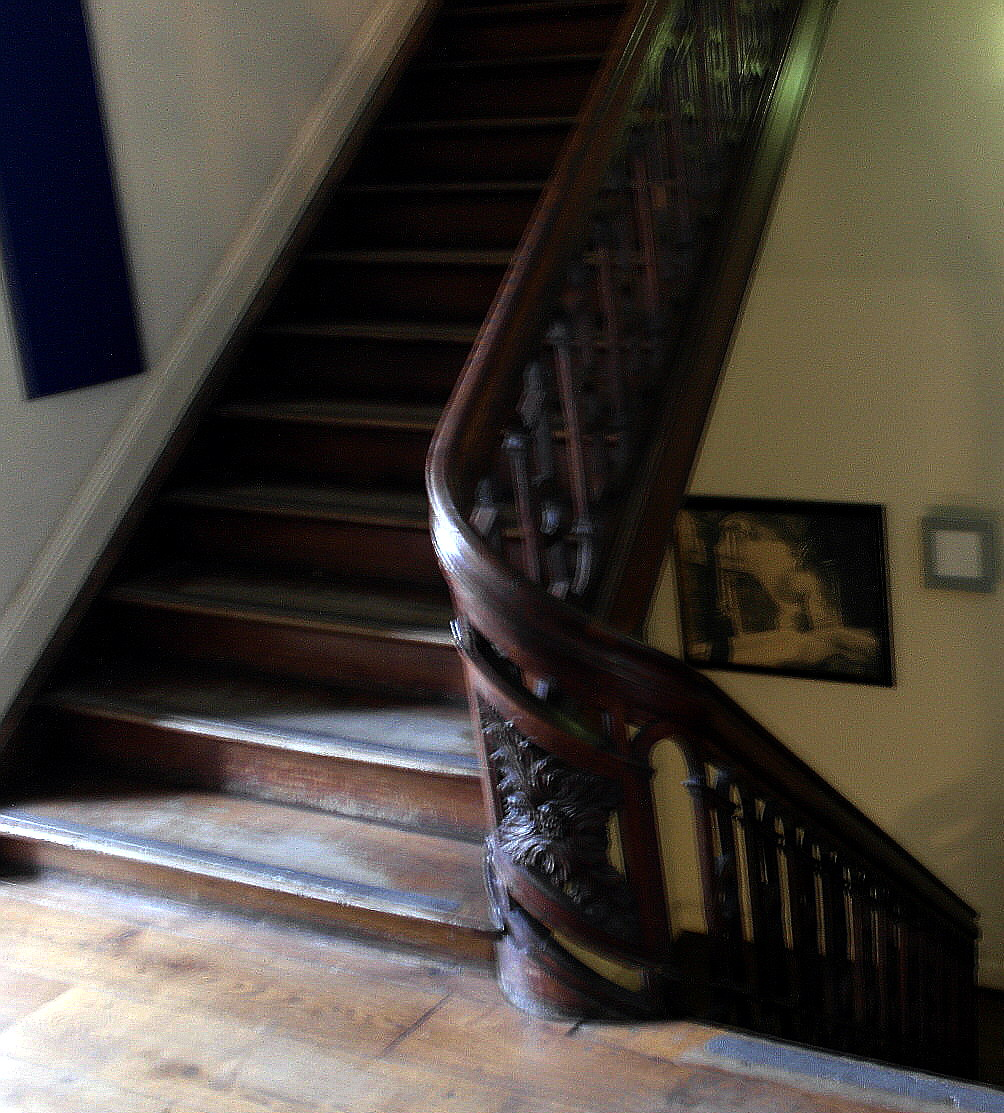
18th century staircase

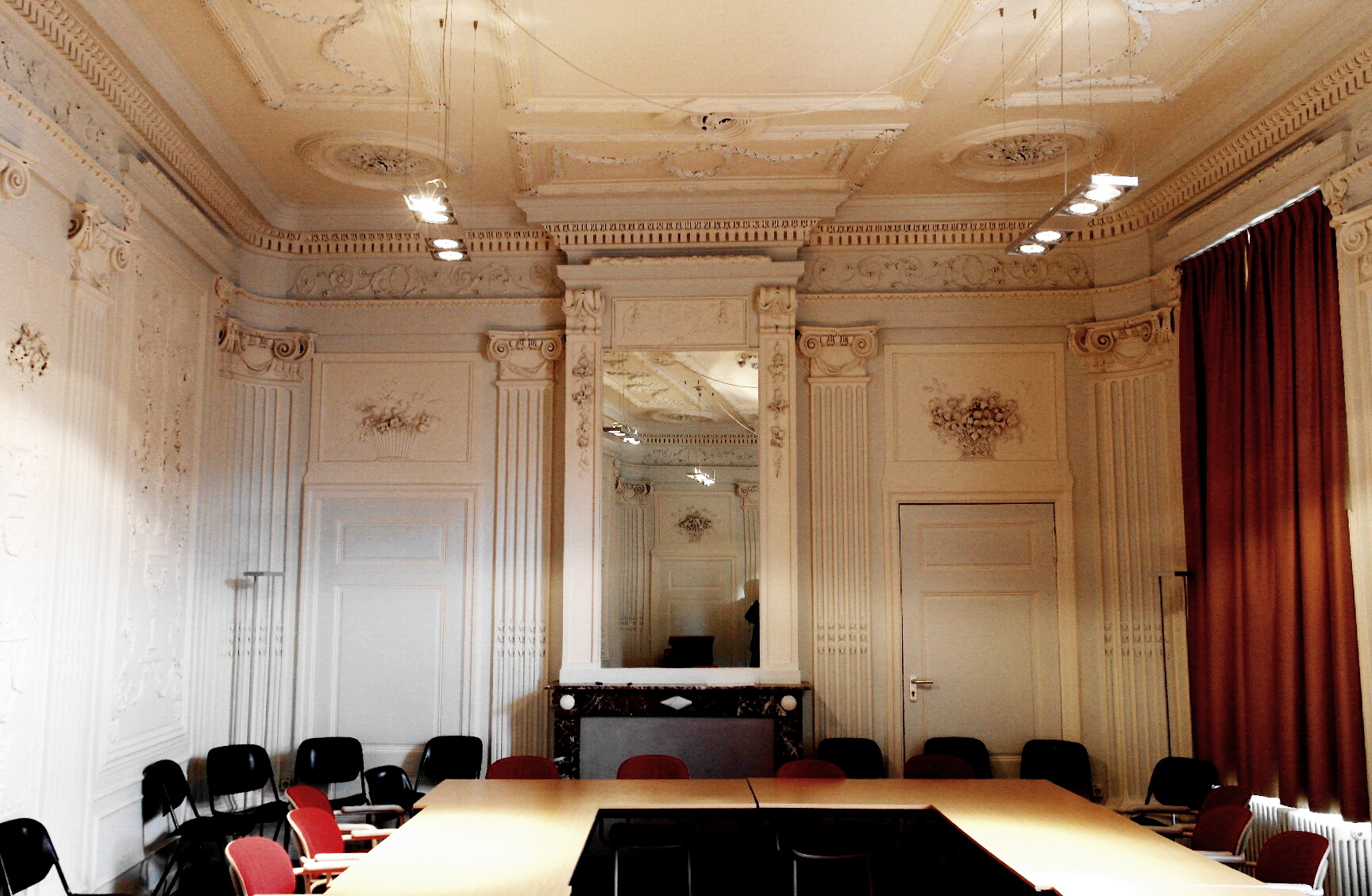
The big salon

==== Decorative stucco large salon ====
The large reception room on the second floor is at the front and extends almost the full width of the building. On the short sides, two mantelpieces face each other, flanked by doors behind which are small service areas. The long south side is dominated by double balcony doors and flanking windows. On the north side, toward the hall, there are also French doors. The ceiling and walls between doors and windows are richly decorated with 18th-century stucco decorations. Wide, fluted pilasters divide the walls into panels, in which are plastered with flower vases, flowers and fruit baskets and candelabra ornaments. The motifs used refer to at the time the newly discovered villas at Pompeii and Herculaneum. Whether the stucco is by Petrus Nicolaas Gagini, who regularly collaborated with Soiron and who worked on the decoration of the House Eyll in Heer in the same year 1785, cannot be said for sure.

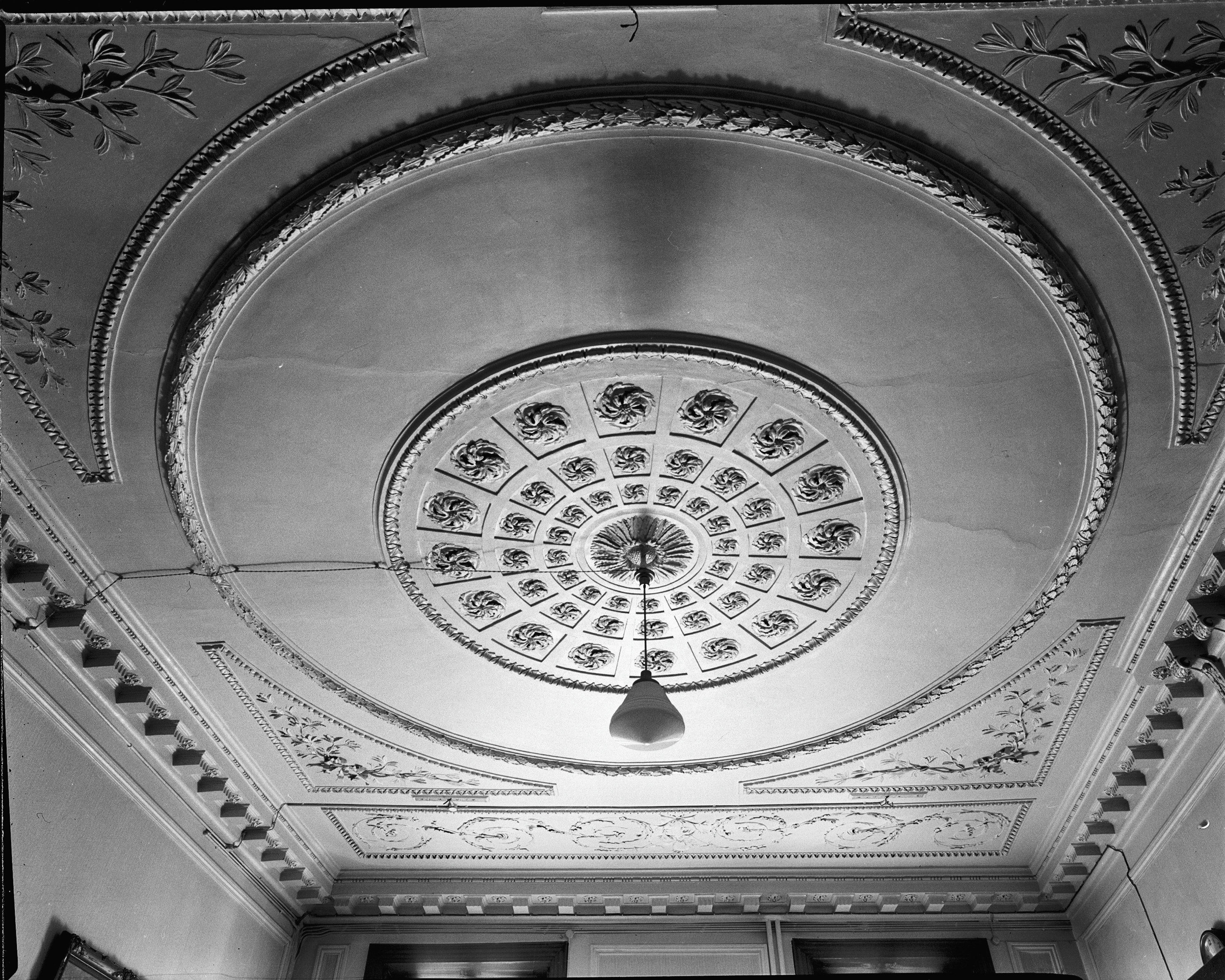
Downstairs front room

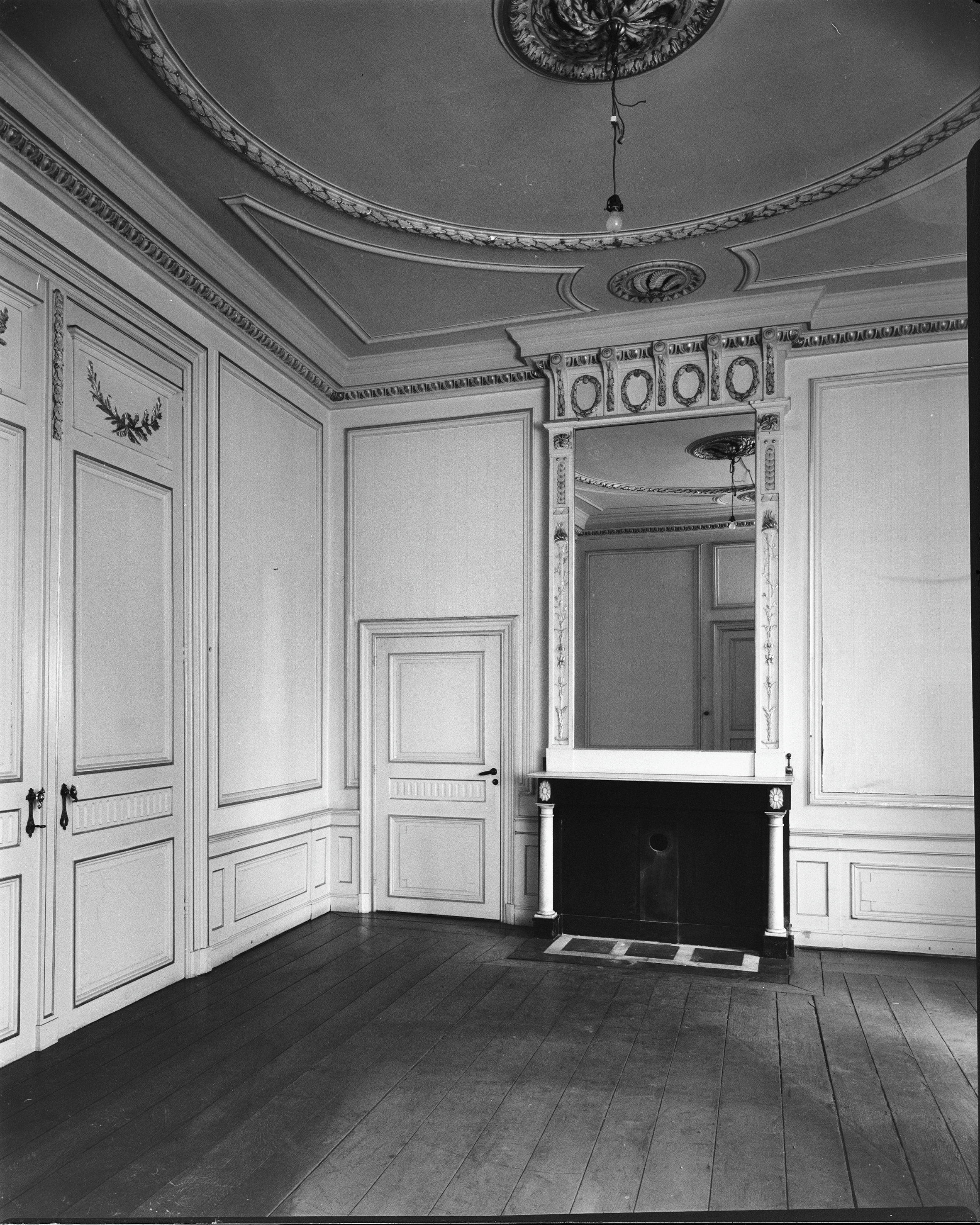
Downstairs backroom

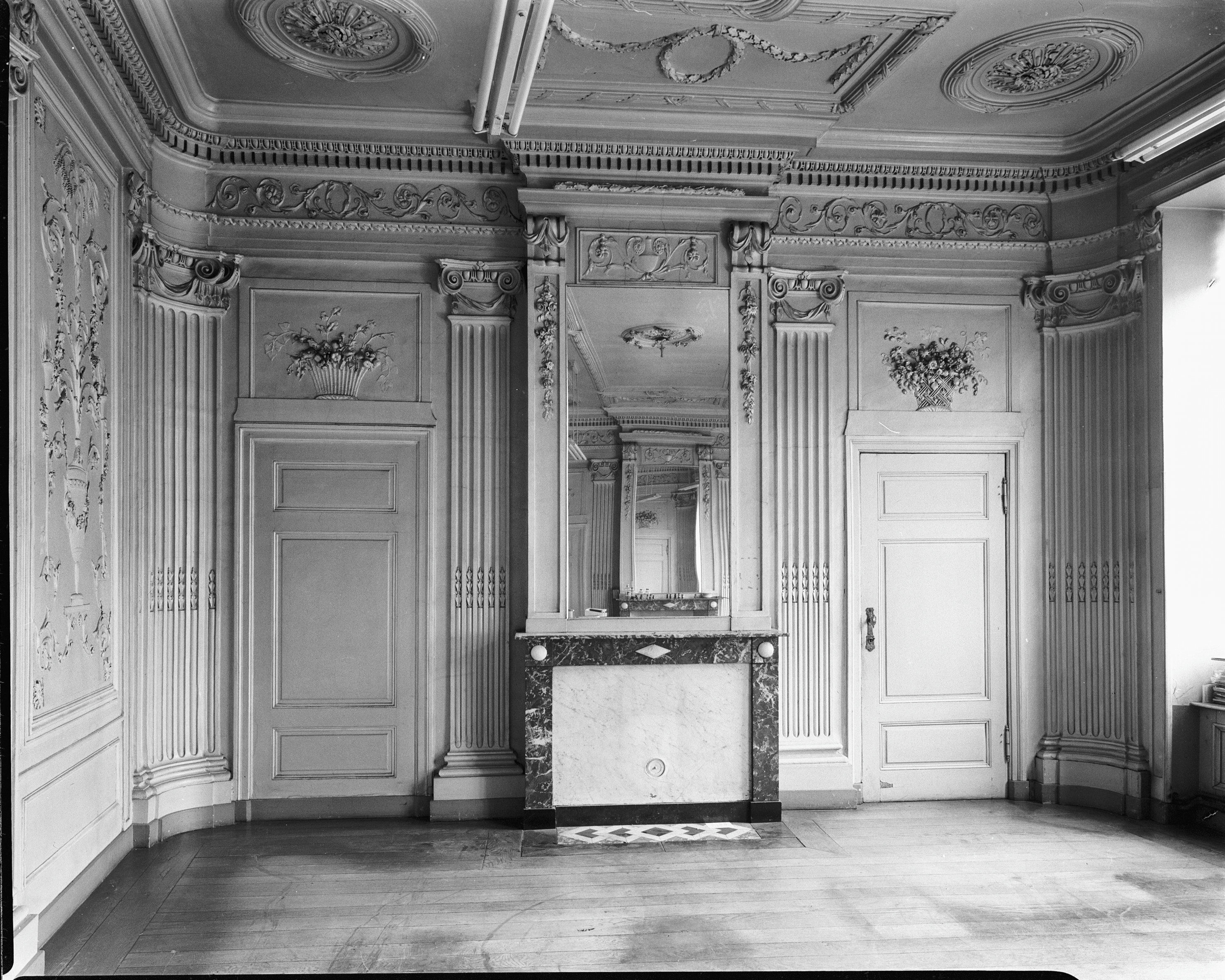
Big Salon first floor

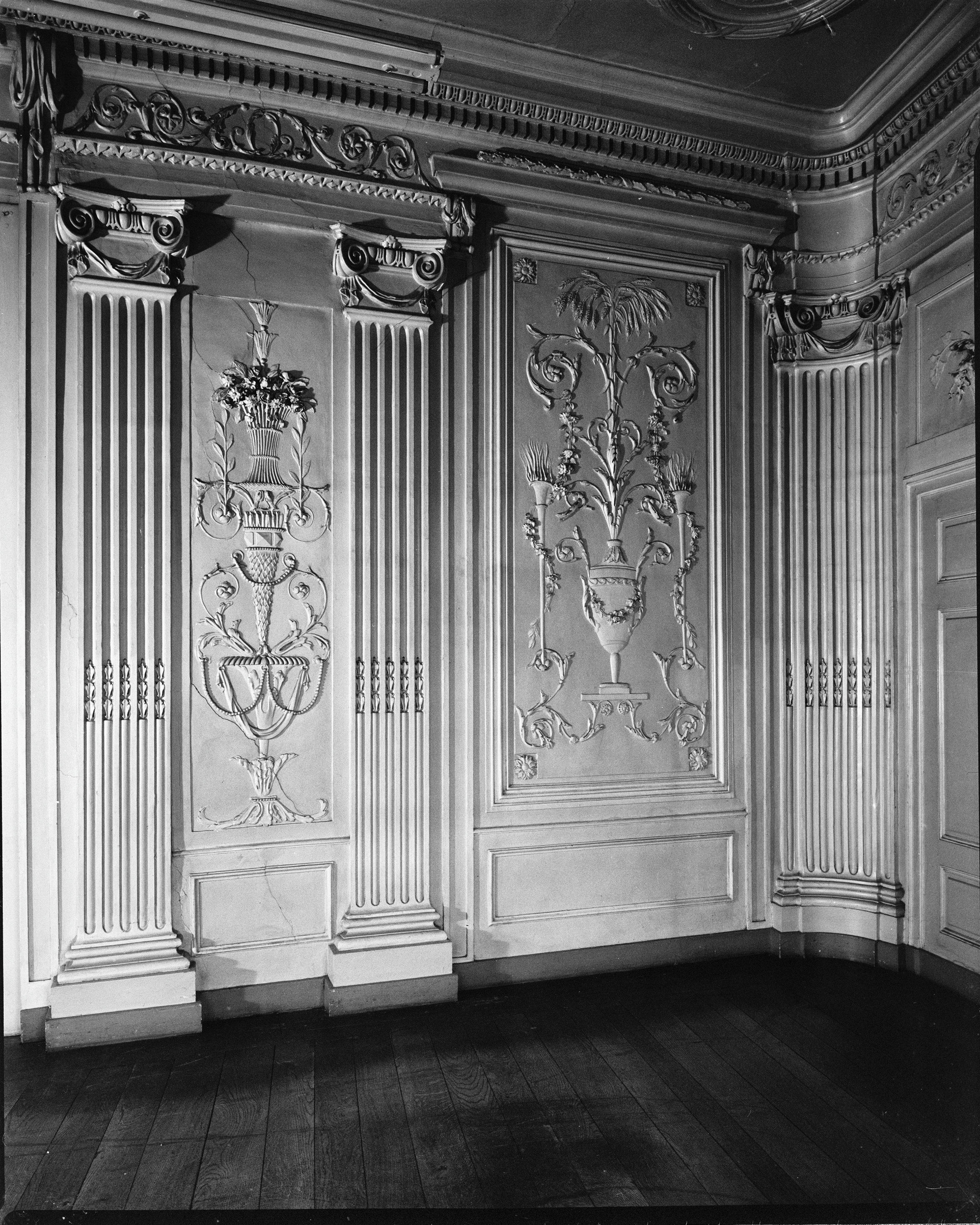
Details big salon
