= De Stille Kracht (TV series) =

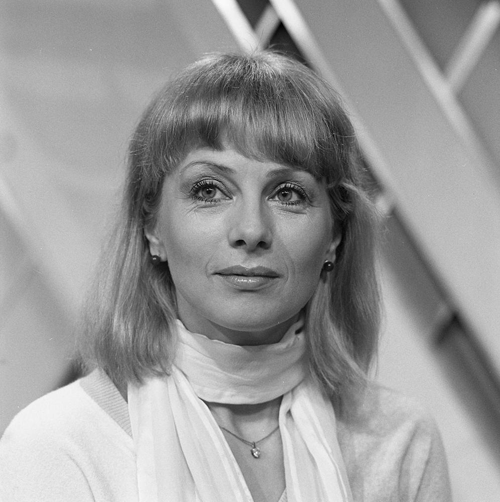
- Pleuni Touw's nude scene was controversial
- Country of origin: Netherlands
- Original language: Dutch

Original release
- Network: AVRO
- Release: 9 September – 23 September 1974

De Stille Kracht ("The Hidden Force") is a Dutch television series from 1974, based on the 1900 novel of the same name by Louis Couperus. The series consisted of three episodes, each of which was eighty minutes long and produced by Algemene Vereniging Radio Omroep (AVRO). It was broadcast from 9 to 23 September and, according to the Netherlands Institute for Sound and Vision, viewed by several million people.

The story is set at the end of the nineteenth century and concerns the cultural gap between East and West, that is between the Netherlands and their colony on Java. The Dutch colonists, who nominally rule Java, realize that the island maintains its own natural order by way of a hidden force, goena goena, a term denoting magic as well as depths of eastern cultures that westerners cannot probe. The original novel contemplated the Dutch people's inability to adapt to the culture and environment of their colony in what is now Indonesia.

The series was directed by Walter van der Kamp, while set design was handled by Wim Bijmoer and music was done by Tonny Eyk. The protagonists were played by Pleuni Touw, Bob de Lange, Hans Dagelet, and Willem Nijholt. Pleuni Touw became the first actress to have a nude scene on Dutch television: it showed her taking a shower while betel spit (some sources say blood) from "invisible mouths" appeared on her body. (Note: The first female nudity on Dutch television was when Phil Bloom flashed the cameras on Hoepla in 1967.) The scene remained controversial afterwards, and although she gained popular recognition she was passed over for later roles; she later commented that, had she been in the United States, producers would have said "grab that girl, she will be good for the box office" (Note: Original: "... pak dat wijf, goed voor de kassa.") and hire her. Meanwhile, Nijholt's role proved his breakthrough one; he later appeared in Hamelen, Willem van Oranje, and Ciske de Rat.

De Stille Kracht was released as a three-piece DVD set in the Netherlands by Bridge Entertainment Group. The release contained no special features except for trailers. Jef Westerveld, reviewing for the DVD site DVD Home, found the story poorly paced yet full of tension; he considered the video and audio standard for Dutch television series of the time, noting that the faded colours were common at the time. A feature film adaptation of the novel and series, directed by Paul Verhoeven, was announced for a projected 2013 release, but ultimately failed to appear.

== Cast ==
- Bob de Lange – Otto van Oudijck
- Pleuni Touw – Leonie van Oudijck
- Willem Nijholt – Theo van Oudijck
- Astrid Ceuleers – Doddy van Oudijck
- Caro van Eyck – De raden-ajoe pangéran
- Lex van Delden – Secretary Eldersma
- Petra Laseur – Eva Eldersma
