= Sterke verhalen =

2010 Dutch comedy film

- Theatrical release poster
- Directed by: Kees van Nieuwkerk; Teddy Cherim
- Written by: Kees van Nieuwkerk; Teddy Cherim
- Produced by: Martin Lagestee
- Starring: Achmed Akkabi; Sallie Harmsen; Manuel Broekman; Géza Weisz; Gwen Pol; Isis Cabolet
- Narrated by: Matthijs van de Sande Bakhuyzen
- Cinematography: Daan Nieuwenhuijs
- Edited by: Dieter Allaerts
- Music by: Fons Merkies
- Production company: Lagestee Film
- Distributed by: A-Film Distribution
- Release date: 19 August 2010 (Netherlands)
- Running time: 85 minutes
- Country: Netherlands
- Language: Dutch
- Budget: €90.000
- Box office: $264,783

Sterke verhalen is a 2010 Dutch independent teen comedy written and directed by Kees van Nieuwkerk and Teddy Cherim and it stars Achmed Akkabi, Sallie Harmsen, Manuel Broekman, Géza Weisz, Gwen Pol and Isis Cabolet. Matthijs van de Sande Bakhuyzen narrates the story of Dennis, a teenage boy who moves to Amsterdam from the countryside. The film included cameos of well-known Dutch actors such as Olga Zuiderhoek, Pierre Bokma, Youp van 't Hek, Halina Reijn, Hans Kesting and Kees Hulst.

== Plot ==
On a rain night a young man named Dennis tells a story about his last summer. He talks about his move to the city shortly after finishing his final exam from the rural village of Overgier to big city of Amsterdam. While receiving directions towards his new home, he meets a new girl by the name of Sanne, who invites to an exclusive party hosted by a drugsdealer Mario and self-assured womanizer. Despite not making a good impression he receives an invitation key, due to Marlon urgently needing the money to pay back 3000 euros to Achie, a man he owes money after gambling it away at a game of Catan.

Sanne who was not aware that her relationship with Marlon was only consisted of a one-night stand, let her convince herself to promote his party across the city. She does this begrudgingly, she wants rather spend her time with her best friends Iris and Lotte, the latter is a dj. Iris was cheated on by her friend Peter and Lotte had sworn off dating men, when she was caught by mother having sex with a boy. In order to forget about all the drama, the girls get drunk and visit on a hotel adventure. Meanwhile, Dennis is hazed by Mario and Marlon. Since a drugtrip, the duo had the desire to have their own penguin, and with Dennis willingness to fit in with the group, they are able, while drunk, to steal a one from the local Artis zoo.

The next morning, Dennis wakes up with a hangover and attempts to bring back the penguin to Artis but he fails. Sanne is brought up to speed by Mario and Marlon about what happened and gave Dennis three keys for the exclusive party out of sympathy. In exchange for this, Dennis can't tell anyone about who the penguin thief is and needs to return the animal to the zoo as soon as possible. However, Dennis is tricked by Marlon, to bring the penguin to the party believing that Sanne wouldn't mind if the penguin would show up.

On the night of the party pretty much everything goes wrong. Peter takes revenge on by Iris, who had him embarrassed by telling his football friends about his cheating, by showing her sex video on a projector. Further more, Mario gets rejected by various women and tries to find consolation in cocaine. Meanwhile, Achie shows up, who was shot in the foot earlier by Mario, demands his money back. In the end, the police arrive to arrest the penguin thief. Marlon, wants to leave with Sanne, but she dumps in order to help Dennis. Eventually, Marlon is beat up by Achie and his mates, Dennis stays in a prison cell overnight but is released by the police in the morning due to lack of evidence

In the end, it is revealed that narrator is Dennis himself. The viewer learns that Sanne broke any contact with Marlon since the party and has since then started a relationship with Dennis.

== Cast ==
- Achmed Akkabi as Dennis van der Moolen
- Sallie Harmsen as Sanne
- Manuel Broekman as Marlon Broekman
- Géza Weisz as Mario
- Isis Cabolet as Iris
- Gwen Pol as Lotte
- Matthijs van de Sande Bakhuyzen as Narrator (Dennis)
- Chloë Leenheer as Rosa
- Leendert de Ridder as Jonathan
- Parcival Tiemessen as Peter de Bruijn
- Jan Hulst as Tatta, neighbour of Dennis
- Omar Dahmani as Nigga, neighbour of Dennis
- Yahya Gaier as Achie
- Halina Reijn as Hostess
- Pierre Bokma as board member
- Hans Kesting as bartender
- Youp van 't Hek as referee
- Jon Karthaus as Paulo, salesman at coffeeshop
- Geraldine Kemper as customer at clothing store
- Kees Hulst as salesman at clothing store
- Teddy Cherim as Teddy
- Sergio IJssel as Winston
- Chrisje Comvalius as mother of Winston
- Olga Zuiderhoek as neighbour of Mario and Marlon
- Sven de Wijn as customer in café

== Production ==
The story for the film was first developed by Kees van Nieuwkerk and Teddy Cherim during their studies at the Metropolitan Film School. The film began as their graduation project and was finished before the two friends had completed their studies. The production took place during a summer vacation without involvement of the Film Fonds or a prior distributor, the cast and crew consisted of friends who worked on the film for free and the rest of the budget was entirely funded by sponsors. The total budget for the film was €90.000.

== Release ==
Sterke verhalen was released in Dutch theaters on August 19, 2010, by A-Film Distribution.

=== Home media ===
The movie was released on DVD by A-Film Home Entertainment on December 16, 2010.
