= Pleuni Touw =

Dutch actress (born 1938)

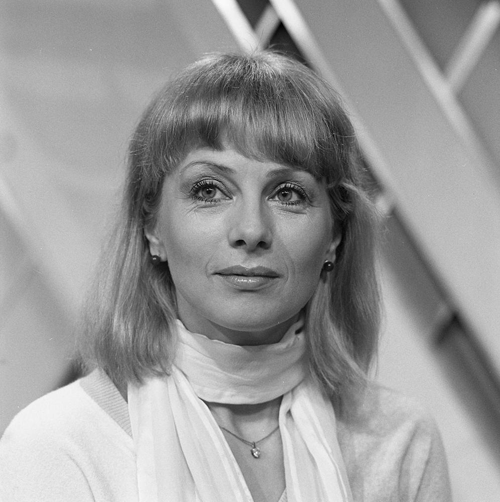
- Touw in 1979
- Born: 8 November 1938 (age 87); Bergen op Zoom, Netherlands
- Occupation: Actress
- Notable work: De Stille Kracht; Bride Flight

Pleuni Touw (born 8 November 1938) is a Dutch film, television and theatre actress best known for her role in the 1974 miniseries De Stille Kracht, which featured the first televised nude scene in Dutch history.

== Life and career ==
Touw was born in Bergen op Zoom on 8 November 1938.

In 1962, Touw signed with the Arnhem School of Theatre. She began her film career in 1968, shortly after divorcing her first husband, working in comedies; she had found few opportunities in theatre, complaining that older actresses were able to play young characters for more than fifty years. Touw worked for the media tycoon Joop van den Ende several times.

In 1974, Touw starred in De Stille Kracht, a drama based on the novel of the same name by Louis Couperus. The series had a nude scene, the first in Dutch television, (Note: The first female nudity on Dutch TV was when Phil Bloom flashed the cameras on Hoepla in 1967.) which showed Touw bathing while betel spit ("blood" in other sources) spontaneously appears on her body. The scene remained controversial afterwards, and although Touw gained popular recognition she was passed over for later roles; she later commented that, had she been in the United States, producers would have said "grab that girl, she will be good for the box office" (Note: Original: "... pak dat wijf, goed voor de kassa.") and hire her. Afterwards she found herself typecast as playing seductive women.

In December 1975, she married fellow actor Hugo Metsers, the son of a businessman, notorious for his role in the 1971 erotic film Blue Movie.

During the 1980s, Touw worked as a director and established her own production company, BV Polona. She attempted to adapt Howard Ashman's 1982 play Little Shop of Horrors and produced a Dutch version of Edward Albee's 1962 work Who's Afraid of Virginia Woolf?. She also modelled, being featured on the cover of the Dutch edition of Playboy in December 1986. In the early 1990s she was inactive, following a reduction in the number of subsidies given to theatrical productions. By the end of the decade she had returned to the theater, acting in a production of Anton Chekhov's The Seagull. She also took a role in Oud Geld (Old Money).

Touw had a small role in the 2008 film Bride Flight, and in 2012 she starred in the medical drama Doctor Deen, playing the mentally unstable mother of Monique van de Ven's character. Later that year she acted in the Dutch adaptation of the 1985 American sitcom The Golden Girls, which was seen by 1.2 million viewers on its 25 August debut.

== Filmography ==
Film

- Rufus (1975)
- Zwaarmoedige Verhalen voor bij de Centrale Verwarming (1975)
- Het Debuut (1977)
- Mijn Vriend (1979)
- Lieve Jongens (1980)
- Het Verboden Bacchanaal (1981)
- De Zwarte Ruiter (1983)
- De Tussentijd (1993)
- Filmpje! (1995)
- De Vriendschap (2001)
- De Dominee (2004)
- Bride Flight (2008)

Television

- Villa des roses (1968)
- De glazen stad (1968)
- De Stille Kracht (1974)
- De Fabriek (1981)
- Diamant – Hester van Tellingen (1993–1994)
- Gemeentebelangen (2002)
- Gooische Vrouwen – Mother of Claire (2009)
- Dokter Deen – Mother of Maria Deen (2000–)
- Golden Girls – Toos (2012–)
