= Bride Flight =

2008 film

- Theatrical release poster
- Directed by: Ben Sombogaart
- Written by: Marieke van der Pol
- Produced by: Hanneke Niens; Anton Smit
- Starring: Karina Smulders; Waldemar Torenstra; Anna Drijver; Pleuni Touw; Petra Laseur; Elise Schaap; Willeke van Ammelrooy; Rutger Hauer
- Cinematography: Piotr Kukla
- Edited by: Herman P. Koerts
- Music by: Jeannot Sanavia
- Distributed by: A-Film Distribution
- Release date: 15 October 2008
- Running time: 130 minutes
- Country: Netherlands
- Language: Dutch

Bride Flight is a 2008 romantic drama film about three women and one man from the Netherlands, who all start new lives in New Zealand. It starts with the victory of the KLM flight in the 1953 London to Christchurch air race. It was directed by Ben Sombogaart and stars Rutger Hauer, Elise Schaap, Anna Drijver, Karina Smulders and Waldemar Torenstra. The Dutch singer Ilse DeLange wrote and sang the title song, Miracle.

== Premise ==
A romantic drama that charts the lives of three women from different backgrounds forever changed when they emigrate to New Zealand as war brides.

== Cast ==
- Karina Smulders as Ada Van Holland
  - Pleuni Touw as Old Ada Van Holland
- Anna Drijver as Esther Cahn
  - Willeke van Ammelrooy as Old Esther Cahn
- Elise Schaap as Marjorie Mullin
  - Petra Laseur as Old Marjorie Mullin
- Waldemar Torenstra as Frank de Rooy
  - Rutger Hauer as Old Frank de Rooy
- Micha Hulshof as Derk Visser
- Mattijn Hartemink as Hans Doorman
- Walter Bart as Leon
