= Anne Wil Blankers =

Dutch actress

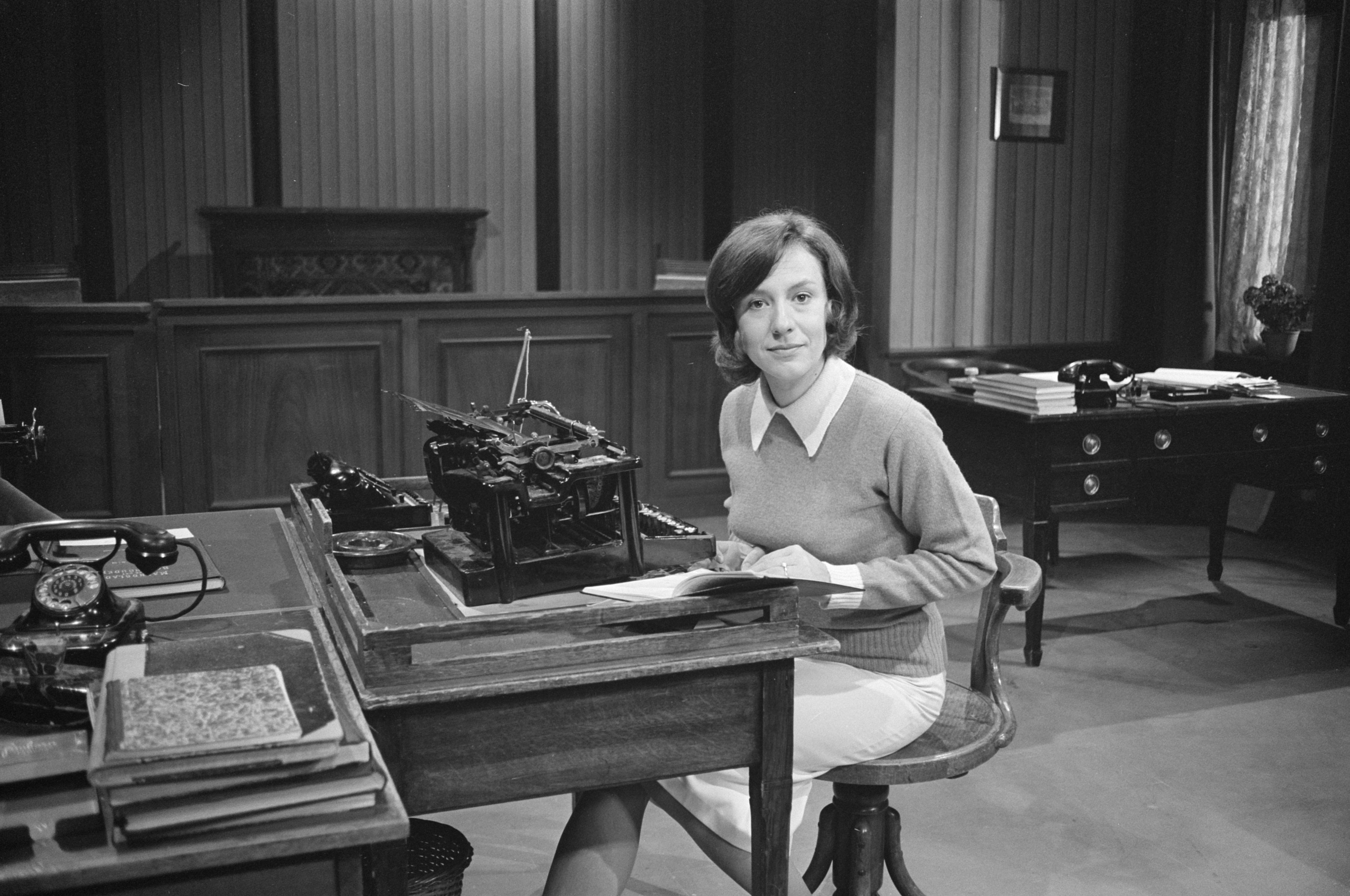
- Born: 21 October 1940 (age 84); Rotterdam, Netherlands
- Years active: 1965–present

Wilhelmina Cornelia Maria (Anne Wil) Blankers (born 21 October 1940) is a Dutch actress. She was awarded the Theo d'Or in 1976 and 1985.

== Selected filmography ==
Year	Title	Role	Notes
1978	De Mantel der Liefde		
1985	Dutch Girls		
2005	Life!	Sybille	
