= Maastricht School of Translation and Interpreting =

Institute of higher learning

- Vertaalacademie Maastricht
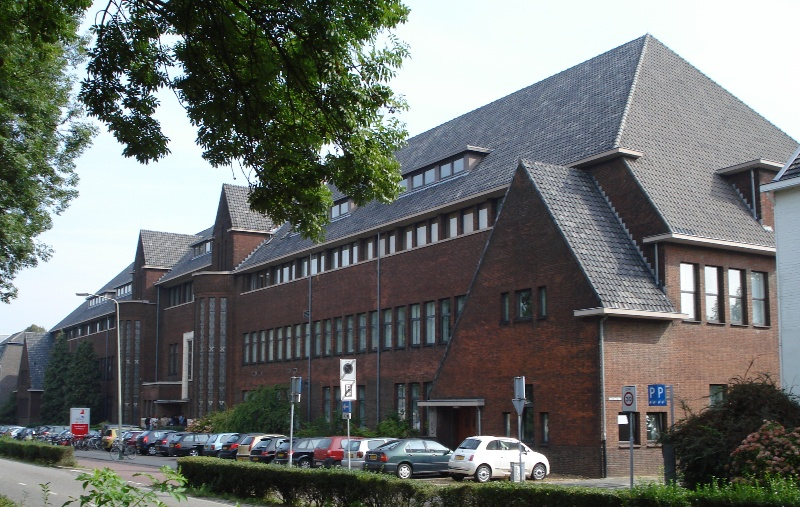
- Main entrance on Brusselseweg 150, Maastricht
- Other names: VAC Maastricht
- Former names: State School of Translation and Interpreting (Rijksinstituut voor HBO opleiding tot vertaler)
- Established: 1981
- Academic affiliations: Zuyd University of Applied Sciences
- Head of Programme: Patrick Wenmakers
- Students: 238 (academic year 2007-2008)
- Location: Maastricht, The Netherlands
- Campus: Brusselseweg 150, 6217 HB Maastricht
- Website: www.vacmaastricht.nl

The Maastricht School of Translation and Interpreting (in Dutch: Vertaalacademie Maastricht) is the only full-time institution of higher education for the training of translators and interpreters situated in the Netherlands.

== Programme ==
The school provides a four-year course leading to the degree Bachelor of Translation. All students study Dutch, English, and one other European language (French, German or Spanish). A foundation year is followed by a three-year main programme during which students specialise in such fields as technical translation, legal translation, professional communication, subtitling, and interpreting.

== History ==
Founded in 1981 as an independent institute named the State School of Translation and Interpreting, the School of Translation has since 2001 been one of the constituent parts of Zuyd University of Applied Sciences. The range of languages offered has varied over time, with provision of Arabic, Chinese and Japanese hived off to a separate institute in 1994, and the provision of Italian, Portuguese and Russian stopped for budgetary reasons.

Initially based in a building on the Keizer Karelplein, the School of Translation subsequently moved to its current location, which incorporates a listed building originally opened in 1932 as a convent boarding school for the Sisters of the Poor Child Jesus.
