= Brothers (2017 drama film) =

2017 film

- Film poster
- Dutch: Boreders
- Directed by: Hanro Smitsman
- Written by: Marc Linssen
- Starring: Achmed Akkabi
- Release date: 23 September 2017
- Running time: 93 minutes
- Country: Netherlands
- Language: Dutch

Brothers (Dutch: Broeders) is a 2017 Dutch drama film directed by Hanro Smitsman. In July 2018, it was one of nine films shortlisted to be the Dutch entry for the Best Foreign Language Film at the 91st Academy Awards, but it was not selected.

== Cast ==
- Achmed Akkabi as Hassan
- Walid Benmbarek as Mourad
- Bilal Wahib as Yasin
- Ghalia Takriti as Suha
