= Achmed Akkabi =

Moroccan-Dutch actor (born 1983)

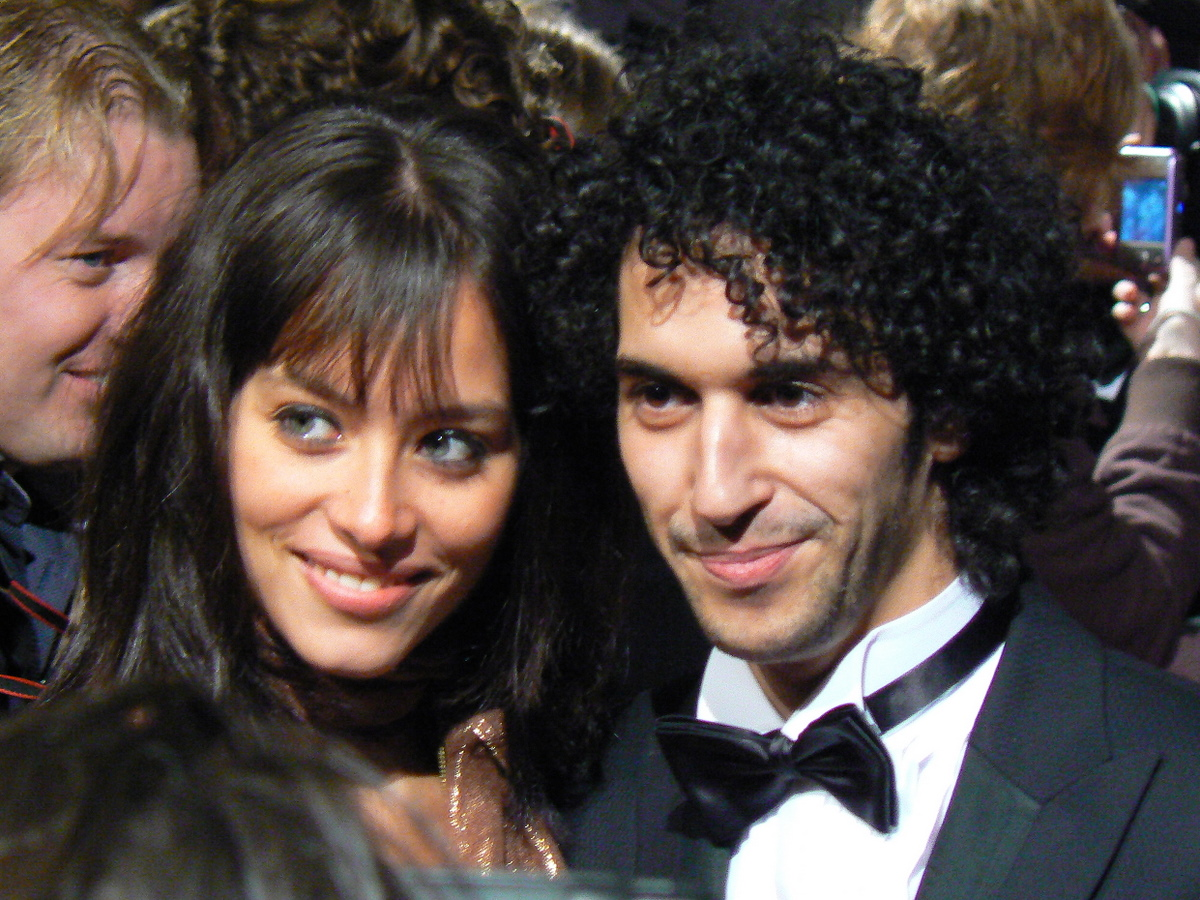
- Achmed Akkabi and his former girlfriend, Liliana
- Born: Achmed Akkabi; 3 October 1983 (age 42); The Hague, Netherlands
- Occupation: Actor
- Partner: Liliana de Vries

Achmed Akkabi (born 3 October 1983, in The Hague) is a Moroccan-Dutch actor. Akkabi was born and raised in The Hague into a family of six. His parents are both immigrants from Morocco. Akkabi became a national celebrity as 'Rachid the merchandiser' in Albert Heijn commercials and for his roles as 'Appie' in Het Huis Anubis, 'Youssef' in the cinema movie Alibi and for presenting AVRO Kunstquest and as Paus in the series Mocro Maffia .

== Selected filmography ==
- Brothers (2017)
- Soof 2 (2016)
- Rabat (2011)
- Sterke verhalen (2010)
