= Ik Omhels Je Met 1000 Armen =

A Thousand Kisses
- Theatrical release poster
- Directed by: Willem van de Sande Bakhuyzen
- Written by: Ruud Schuurman; Edward Stelder
- Based on: Ik Omhels Je Met 1000 Armen by Ronald Giphart
- Produced by: Hanneke Niens; Anton Smit; Brechtje Schaling
- Starring: Tijn Docter; Carice van Houten; Catherine ten Bruggencate; Halina Reijn; Johnny de Mol
- Cinematography: Lex Brand
- Edited by: Wouter Jansen
- Music by: Fons Merkies
- Production company: IDTV
- Distributed by: A-Film Distribution
- Release date: 9 March 2006
- Running time: 110 minutes
- Country: Netherlands
- Language: Dutch
- Budget: € 2,500,000
- Box office: $403,394

A Thousand Kisses (Dutch: Ik omhels je met 1000 armen) is a 2006 Dutch drama film directed by Willem van de Sande Bakhuyzen. It was based on the novel of the same name by Ronald Giphart. This was van de Sande Bakhuyzen's final film and was released posthumously.

The film received two Golden Calves, Catherine ten Bruggencate for Best Supporting Actress and Best Sound Design.

== Plot ==
Giph (Tijn Docter) is a young security guard and writer. He has a girlfriend, Samarinde (Carice van Houten), who is a physician and model. They are on holiday in Spain with their friends. Giph's mother, Lotti (Catherine ten Bruggencate), has recently died. Giph plans to end the relationship after the holiday. Samarinde turns out to be pregnant, and the question arises whether Samarinde will have an induced abortion. However, she has a miscarriage. Giph loves Samarinde again and they continue the relationship.

A large part of the film consists of flashbacks, about Lotti's multiple sclerosis and euthanasia by lethal injection, and Giph's relationship with Samarinde.

== Cast ==
- Tijn Docter as Giph
- Carice van Houten as Samarinde
- Catherine ten Bruggencate as Lotti, Giphs mother
- Halina Reijn
- Johnny de Mol
