= Hanro Smitsman =

Hanro Smitsman, born in 1967 in Breda (Netherlands), is a writer and director of film and television.

== Film and Television Credits ==
=== Films ===
- Brothers (2017)
- Schemer (2010)
- Skin (2008)
- Raak (aka Contact) (2006)
- Allerzielen (aka All Souls) (2005) (segment "Groeten uit Holland")
- Engel en Broer (2004)
- 2000 Terrorists (2004)
- Dajo (2003)
- Gloria (2000)
- Depoep (2001)

=== Television ===
- 20 leugens, 4 ouders en een scharrelei (2013)
- De ontmaskering van de vastgoedfraude (TV mini-series, 2013)
- Moordvrouw (2012-)
- Eileen (2 episodes, 2011)
- Getuige (2011)
- Vakantie in eigen land (2011)
- De Reis van meneer van Leeuwen(2010)
- De Punt (2009)
- Roes (2 episodes, 2008)
- Fok jou! (2006)
- Van Speijk (2006)

== Awards ==
In 2005, Engel en Broer won Cinema Prize for Short Film at the Avanca Film Festival.

In 2007, Raak (aka Contact) won the Golden Berlin Bear Award at the Berlin International Film Festival, the Spirit Award at the Brooklyn Film Festival, the first place jury prize for "Best Live Action under 15 minutes" at the Palm Springs International Short Film Festival, and the Prix UIP Ghent Award for European Short Films at the Flanders International Film Festival.

In 2008, Skin won the Movie Squad Award at the Nederlands Film Festival, an actor in the film also won the Best Actor Award. It also won the Reflet d’Or for Best Film at the Cinema tous ecrans Festival in Geneva in the same year.
