= Chrisje Comvalius =

Dutch actress (1948–2023)

- Born: 25 January 1948; Aruba, Curaçao and Dependencies
- Died: 22 August 2023 (aged 75)
- Education: University of Amsterdam
- Occupation: Actress

Chrisje Comvalius (25 January 1948 – 22 August 2023) was a Dutch actress.

Comvalius died on 22 August 2023, at the age of 75.

== Biography ==
Comvalius' parents were of Surinamese origin . She was born in Aruba and attended primary school there. In 1963 she moved to the Netherlands where she completed her secondary education and then went on to study Dutch at the University of Amsterdam. After this she worked for many years as a teacher's counselor at a secondary school for difficult children in Rotterdam. She lived alternately in the Netherlands, Aruba and Sint Maarten.

=== Career ===
As an actress, Comvalius performed mainly in smaller roles in various Dutch feature films. She also participated in various soaps, also in smaller roles. From 2004 to 2008, she had a leading role in the well-known Dutch soap Goede tijden, slechte tijden. Before this, she performed in the theater for three years with a monologue performance entitled "MaStella", which she picked up again in a revival after her role in the soap in 2008, now under the direction of the author of the monologue, Jenny Mijnhijmer, and performed in the Netherlands and Suriname in 2008.

In 2009, she provided the voice of Eudorda, Princess Tiana's mother, in the Disney animated film The Princess and the Frog.

== Filmography ==
- Ben zo terug (2000)
- Rozengeur & Wodka Lime (2001)
- South (2004)
- Love Trap (2004)
- In Orange (2004)
- Goede tijden, slechte tijden (2004–2008)
- Off Screen (2005)
- All Souls (2005)
- Sterke verhalen (2010)
- VRijland (2010–2012)
- Beautiful Life (2011)
- Achtste Groepers Huilen Niet (2012)
- Nooit te oud (2013)
- Vechtershart (2015)
- Hunter Street (2018)
