= Caro van Eyck =

Dutch stage and television actress

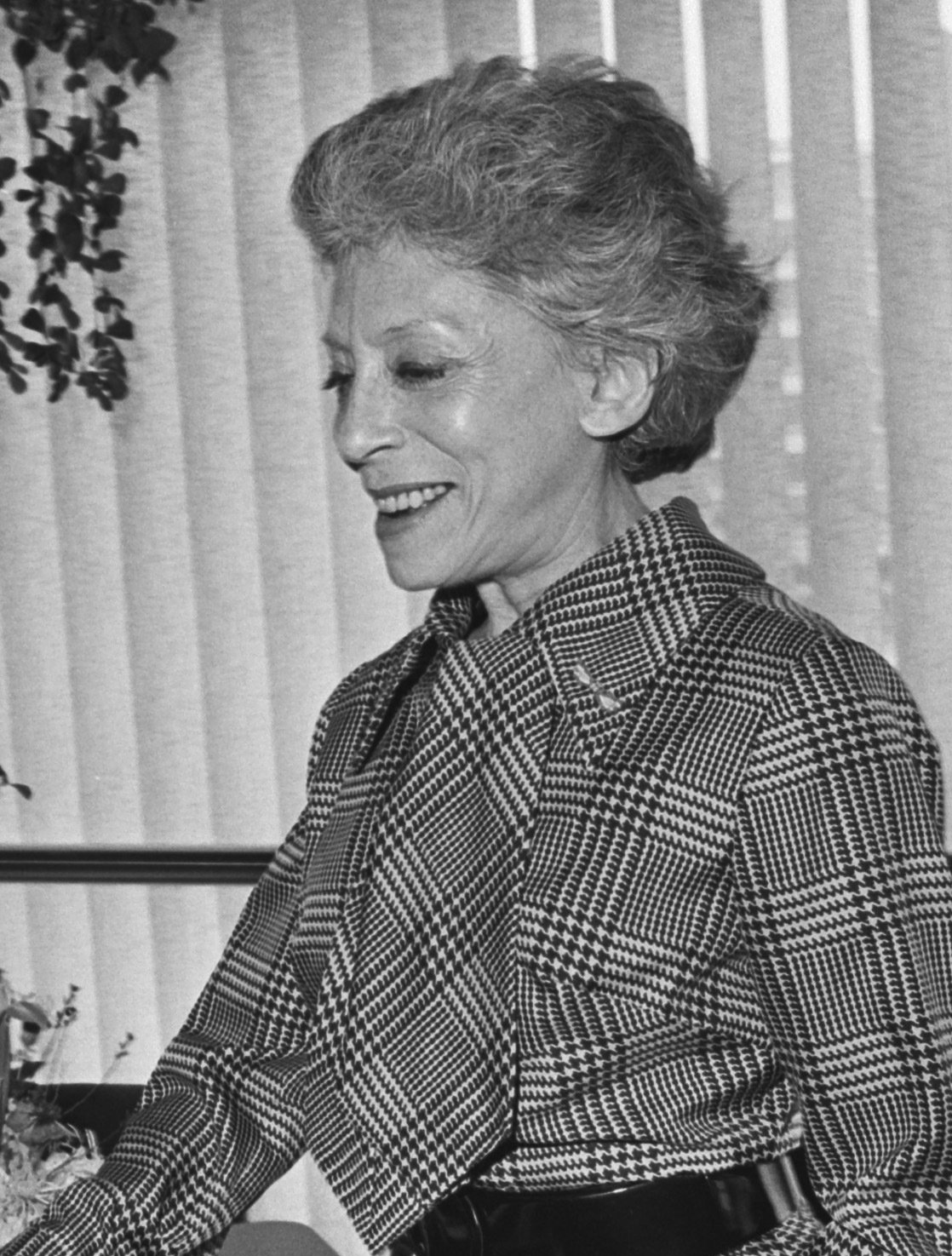
- Caro van Eyck in 1976
- Born: Gerarda Jacobina Everdina Taytelbaum; 27 November 1915; Batavia, Dutch East Indies
- Died: 15 September 1979 (aged 63); Amstelveen, Netherlands
- Occupation: Actress
- Years active: 1936–1979
- Spouses: Paul Steenbergen (m. 1938; div. 1945); Alexander Sternheim (m. 1948; div. 1952); Samuel Boekman (m. 1952–1978)

Caro van Eyck (born Gerarda Jacobina Everdina Taytelbaum; 27 November 1915 – 15 September 1979) was a Dutch stage and television actress.

== Early life ==
Van Eyck was born in Batavia, where her father was a judge and later vice-president of the Supreme Court of the Dutch East Indies. She grew up in a family of Jewish background and moved to The Hague in 1928. After completing the gymnasium, she began studying law at Leiden University at her father's insistence. She did not complete her degree and instead chose a career in acting. Van Eyck took private acting lessons, attended a summer course in Bath, England and became involved in student theatre before joining the Rotterdamsch Hofstad Toneel in 1936, where she made her stage debut.

== Career ==
In 1938, Van Eyck joined the Residentie Tooneel in The Hague. During the German occupation of the Netherlands her career was interrupted when she was banned from performing in 1942 because of her Jewish background. She supported herself briefly as a cashier and by giving clandestine private readings, which she referred to as “black recitals”.

After the liberation, Van Eyck resumed her career and became a leading character actress and tragédienne with the Haagse Comedie. She was particularly acclaimed for classical roles such as Antigone, Medea, and Klytaimnestra in Iphigenia in Aulis, as well as for roles in plays by Lillian Hellman, Eugene O'Neill, and Tennessee Williams. She later worked with several other theatre companies, including the Amsterdams Toneelgezelschap and the Rotterdams Toneel.

Van Eyck also appeared frequently on television and became widely known through series such as De kleine zielen, De stille kracht, and Van oude mensen, de dingen die voorbijgaan.

== Later life and death ==
Her final major stage role was in D. L. Coburn's Een gelukkige hand, which she was forced to relinquish due to illness. Van Eyck died at her home in Amstelveen on 15 September 1979 at the age of 63 and donated her body to science.

== Awards ==
Caro van Eyk receives the Theo Mann-Bouwmeester ring (1960)

- Theo Mann-Bouwmeesterring (1960)
- Theo d'Or award (1979)

== Publications ==
- Eyck, Caro van, ’t Is maar geleend. Je mag het even vasthouden, Bussum: Teleboek, 1972, ISBN 9061224314
