= Anton Smit =

Dutch screenwriter and producer

- Born: 22 August 1945; Markelo, Netherlands
- Occupations: Film producer, Television producer
- Notable work: Twin Sisters; Cloaca; Godforsaken

Anton Smit (born 22 August 1945) is a Dutch screenwriter, television and film producer.

== Selected filmography ==
=== Feature films ===
- Familie (2001)
- De Tweeling (2002)
- Van God Los (2003)
- Cloaca (2003)
- Leef! (2005)
- Ik omhels je met 1000 armen (2006)
- Unfinished Sky (2007)
- Bride Flight (2008)
- Separation City (2009)
- Vreemd bloed (2010)
- Majesteit (2011)

=== Television ===
- Fort Alpha (1996-1997)
- Oud Geld (1998-1999)
- Zinloos (2004)
- Eilandgasten (2005)
- Escort (2006)
- Dag in dag uit (2008)
- Witte vis (2009)
