= Rabat (film) =

2011 Dutch road movie

- Theatrical release poster
- Directed by: Victor D. Ponten; Jim Taihuttu
- Written by: Victor D. Ponten; Jim Taihuttu
- Produced by: Julius Ponten; Frieder Wallis
- Starring: Achmed Akkabi; Mohamed Benbrahim; Jacqueline Bir; Stéphane Caillard; Slimane Dazi; Nasrdin Dchar; Marwan Kenzari; Mohamed Majd; Julius Ponten; Walid Rhord
- Cinematography: Lennart Verstegen; Alex Wuijts
- Edited by: Wouter van Luijn
- Music by: Mark van den Oever
- Production company: Habbekrats
- Distributed by: Benelux Film Distributors
- Release date: 9 June 2011
- Running time: 105 minutes
- Country: Netherlands
- Languages: Dutch; French; Spanish; Arabic; English
- Box office: $545,764

Rabat is a 2011 Dutch road film, and the first film made by Jim Taihattu and Victor Ponten, from independent Dutch advertising company Habbekrats. It was filmed in the summer of 2010 during a period of five weeks. The premiere was on the 6 June 2011 at Tuschinski in Amsterdam. The three main characters are played by Nasrdin Dchar, Achmed Akkabi and Marwan Kenzari.

== Plot ==
In the movie Nadir (Nasrdin Dchar) has to bring a taxi that used to belong to his dad, to his uncle in Rabat, in Morocco.

At first he intends to go alone, but his two friends Abdel and Zakaria invite themselves along. They travel through the Netherlands, Belgium, France, Spain and Morocco. Along the way they experience all kind of things. In France they picked up a hitchhiker called Julie, with whom he falls in love. In Spain they get arrested and treated unfairly by the police, and when they go clubbing in Barcelona with Julie and her friends, they aren't allowed in the club, because they're foreigners. Along the way Nadir is keeping a secret from his two best friends with whom he has been friends with for seventeen years, and is planning on opening a shoarma restaurant with. The secret causes a big fight on their way there, but also makes their friendship stronger.

At the end they all go their own way; Nadir goes back to Barcelona, to Julie, Zakaria goes to visit and find his family in Tunisia, and Abdel goes back to Amsterdam to start up their shoarma restaurant.

== Cast ==
- Nasrdin Dchar as Nadir
- Achmed Akkabi as Abdel
- Marwan Kenzari as Zakaria
- Stéphane Caillard as Julie
- Nadia Kounda as Yasmina
- Slimane Dazi as Dade Exporter
