= Life! =

- Theatrical release poster
- Directed by: Willem van de Sande Bakhuyzen
- Written by: Maria Goos
- Produced by: Hanneke Niens; Anton Smit
- Starring: Monic Hendrickx; Peter Blok; Anne-Wil Blankers; Petra Laseur; Tanja Jess; Jeroen Willems; Jeroen Krabbé
- Cinematography: Joost van Gelder
- Music by: Fons Merkies
- Production companies: IdTV Film; NPS
- Distributed by: A-Film Distribution
- Release date: 29 September 2005
- Running time: 110 minutes
- Country: Netherlands
- Language: Dutch
- Box office: $667,160

Life! (Dutch: Leef!) is a 2005 Dutch drama film directed by Willem van de Sande Bakhuyzen and written by Maria Goos. Director Willem van de Sande Bakhuyzen died the day before the premiere. Sophie van Winden won the 2005 Golden Calf award for the best supporting actress.

== Cast ==
- Monic Hendrickx as Anna
- Anne-Wil Blankers as Sybille
- Peter Blok as Paul
- Sarah Jonker as Robin
- Sophie van Winden as Isabelle
- Tanja Jess as Jolande
- Ali Ben Horsting as Gregor
- Petra Laseur as Lies
- Roos Ouwehand as Sybille (Age 20)
- Jeroen Krabbé as Hugo
- Jeroen Willems as Gerard
- Jacqueline Blom as Ellie

== See also ==
- List of Dutch films of 2005
