= Matthijs van de Sande Bakhuyzen =

Dutch actor (born 1988)

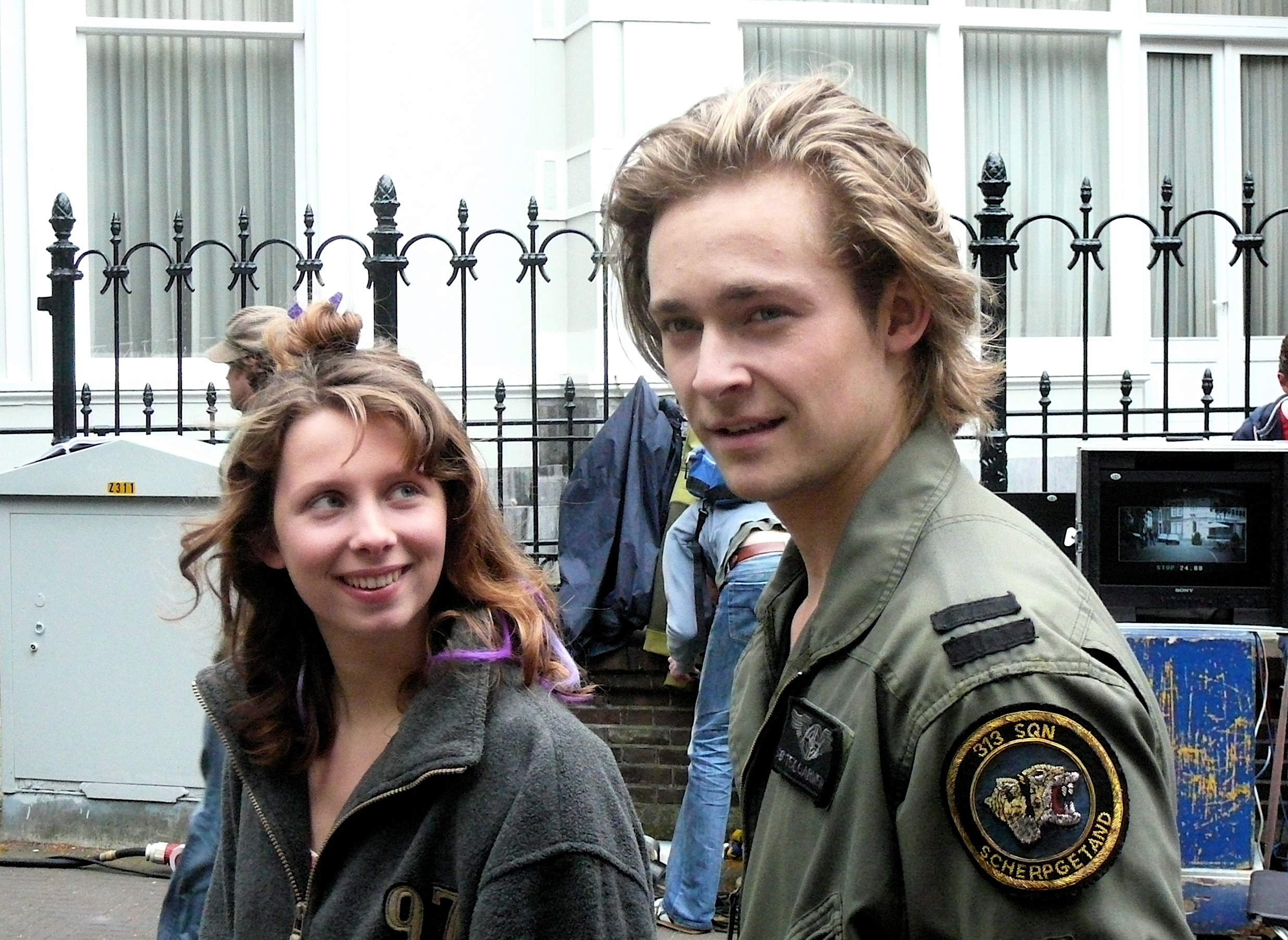
- van de Sande Bakhuyzen and Loïs de Jong playing Benny and Gini in the 2008 film APP
- Born: Matthijs Nicolaas van de Sande Bakhuyzen; 16 October 1988 (age 37); Amsterdam, North Holland, Netherlands
- Occupation: Actor
- Father: Willem van de Sande Bakhuyzen

Matthijs Nicolaas van de Sande Bakhuyzen (born 16 October 1988) is a Dutch movie and television actor and former child actor.

== Biography ==
Matthijs van de Sande Bakhuyzen was born on 16 October 1988 in Amsterdam, the son of movie director Willem van de Sande Bakhuyzen. His younger sister, Roeltje, who also became an actor, was born four years later.

His big break was in 1999, with the role of Erik in the VPRO television series De Daltons. He later played small roles in several films directed by his father, including Cloaca (2003) and Leef! (2005). That same year, his father died of cancer. In 2006, he had his first big role in a movie when he beat 4000 other applicants for the role of Jordi in the movie Afblijven, a teen-oriented film based on a novel by Carry Slee. He took acting lessons from Carla van Driel and Tom de Ket in 2006. At the end of 2006, he filmed De Daltons, de jongensjaren, the sequel of De Daltons which was aired in the 2007-08 television season.

In 2008, he appeared in the telefilm Bloedbroeders. In 2009, he appeared in Het Leven uit een dag (2009). In 2011, he graduated from the Theatre Academy Maastricht. He has appeared in the musical Help! at Seattle Children's Theatre.

== Filmography ==
Year	Film	Role	Notes
2001	Saint Amour	Louis at age 12	Television movie
2003	Cloaca	Bram	Television movie
2005	Leef!	Boy in coffeeshop	
2006	Penvriendin	Johan	Short film
2006	Absolutely Positive	Boy #1	Short film
2006	Keep Off	Jordi	
2008	Bloedbroeders	Arnout van Riebeeck	Telefilm
2008	Dunya & Desie	Brother of Desie	
2009	Het Leven uit een Dag	Benny	
2013	APP	Benny	
2014	Boy 7	Sam	
