= Pierre Bokma =

Dutch actor (born 1955)

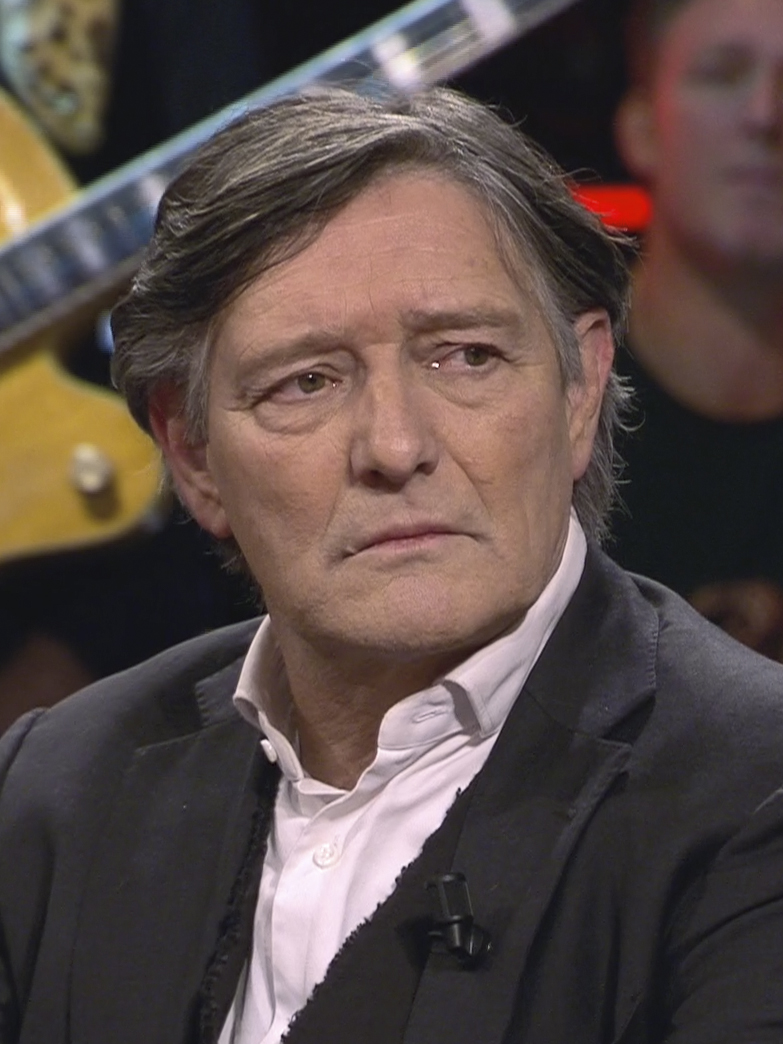
- Pierre Bokma in 2018
- Born: Pierre Henri Martin Bokma; 20 December 1955 (age 70); Paris, France
- Occupation: Actor
- Years active: 1983–present
- Children: 4
- Awards: 2001; Golden Calf for Best Acting in a Television Drama 'Belager'

Pierre Henri Martin Bokma (born 20 December 1955 in Paris) is a Dutch stage, television and film actor.

Bokma received his professional training at the Maastricht Academy of Dramatic Arts. In November 2007 he won an International Emmy Award for his role in the movie De uitverkorene (The Chosen One). He shared his award with the British actor Jim Broadbent.

== Filmography ==
- The Assault (1986)
- Evenings (1989)
- Prospero's Books (1991)
- The Province (1991)
- De Rode Zwaan (1999)
- Miss Minoes (2001)
- Snapshots (2002)
- The Enclave (2002) (TV film)
- Interview (2003)
- Cloaca (2003)
- Dalziel and Pascoe (2006, "Wrong Time, Wrong Place")
- Waiter (2006)
- Moordwijven (2007)
- Stricken (2009)
- The Dark House (2009)
- Sterke verhalen (2010)
- Sleeping Sickness (2011)
- The Gang of Oss (2011)
- Quiz (2012)
- Schneider vs. Bax (2015)
- Cosmos Laundromat (2015)
- Tonio (2016)
- Rundfunk (2016)
- The Blue Virgin (2018)
- The Resistance Banker (2018)
- Patrick (2019)
- Nr. 10 (2021)
- Wil (2023)
- Amsterdamned II (2025)

== Personal life ==
In 2024 Bokma was interviewed on the Dutch television long form interview program VPRO Zomergasten.
