= Nasrdin Dchar =

Moroccan-Dutch actor and presenter

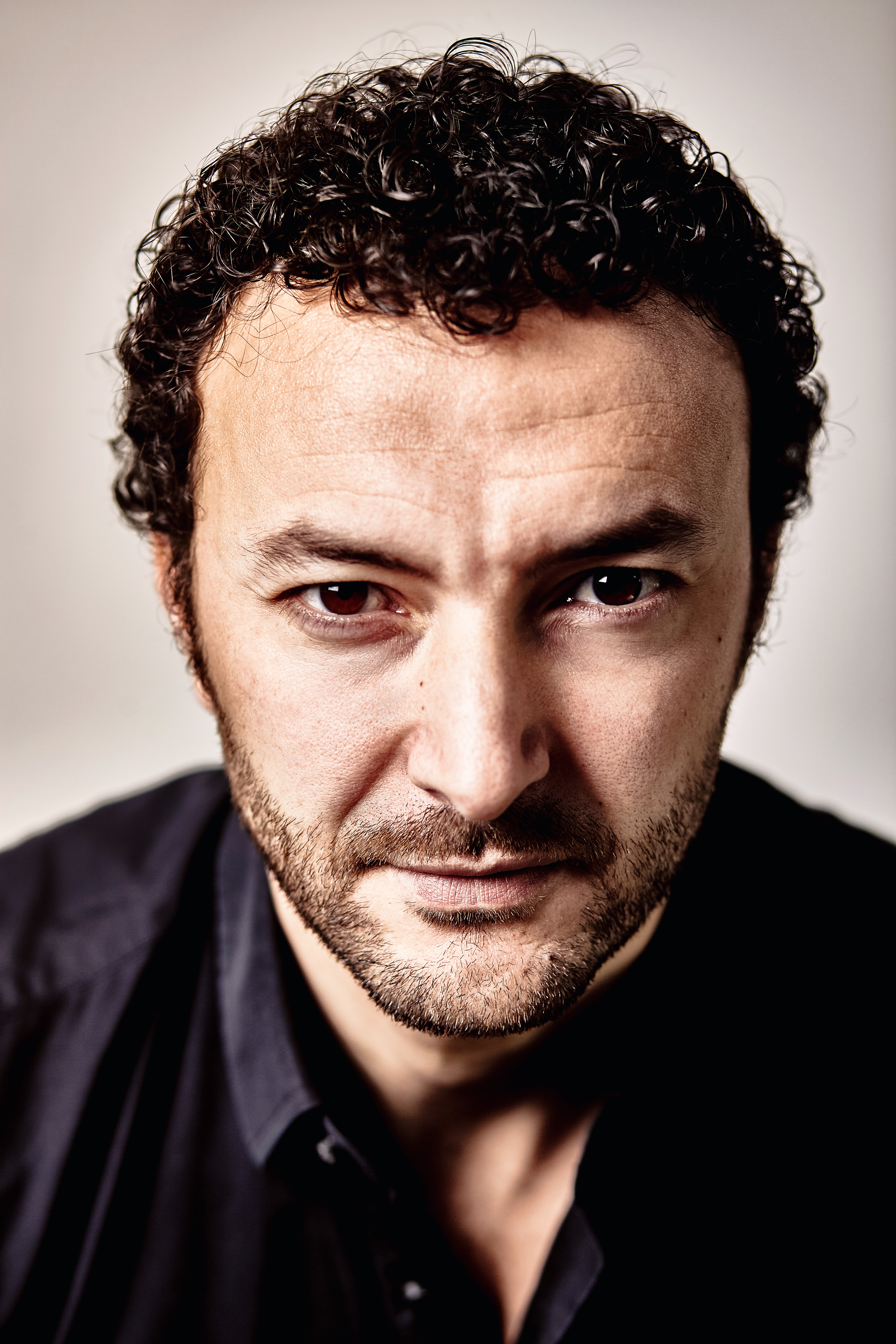
- Dchar (2016)
- Born: Nasrdin Dchar; 5 November 1978 (age 47); Steenbergen, Netherlands
- Occupations: Actor, presenter

Nasrdin Dchar (born 5 November 1978) is a Moroccan-Dutch actor and presenter.

== Career ==
Dchar has acted in theatre productions. His first important television appearance was in Cut, a youth series of BNN. He is also seen in soap opera Onderweg naar Morgen, Eddy Terstall's Mannenharem and as a lead character in drama series VARA Deadline. He also presents AVRO 'Op de Bon'.

Dchar is a Muslim and when he played a gay man in Mannenharem it caused some controversy within the Dutch Islamic community. He also played in the film Rabat, a role for which he received the Gouden Kalf award for Best Actor on 30 September 2011. He played Felix Halverstad in the 2012 Dutch film Süskind.

In 2013 he played a gay nurse (Omar Sahar) in the television series "Charlie" (Dutch remake of Nurse Jackie).

He appeared in the 2024 season of the television show The Masked Singer.

== Personal life ==
Dchar is married with two children.
