= Traces of Smoke =

1992 film

Rooksporen
- Directed by: Frans van de Staak
- Written by: Frans van de Staak (writer), Lidy van Marissing (play)
- Release date: 1992
- Running time: 105 minutes
- Country: Netherlands
- Language: Dutch

Traces of Smoke or Rooksporen is a 1992 Dutch drama film directed by Frans van de Staak.

== Cast ==
- Marlies Heuer ... De vrouw
- Peter Blok ... De vragensteller
- Joop Admiraal
- Rein Bloem
- Sacha Bulthuis
- Carine Crutzen
- Hildegard Draayer
- René Eljon
- Andrea den Haring
- Hans Hausdörfer
- Thom Hoffman
- Ineke Holzhaus
- Ingrid Kuipers
- Willem Kwakkelstein
- Johan Leysen
- Colla Marsman
- Tessa du Mee
- Wim Meuwissen
- Titus Muizelaar
- Frieda Pittoors
- Lineke Rijxman
- Hanneke Stark
- Catherine ten Bruggencate
- Huub van der Lubbe
- Manouk van der Meulen
- Anke Van't Hof
- Hilt de Vos
- Nico de Vries
