= Boy 7 (2015 German film) =

- Directed by: Özgür Yıldırım
- Based on: Boy 7 by Mirjam Mous
- Starring: David Kross; Emilia Schüle
- Release date: 26 June 2015 (MIFF)
- Running time: 1h 48min
- Country: Germany
- Language: German

Boy 7 is a 2015 German action film based on the eponymous novel by Mirjam Mous.

== Cast ==
- David Kross - Sam (Boy 7)
- Emilia Schüle - Lara (Girl 8)
- Ben Münchow - Louis (Boy 6)
- Jens Harzer - Isaak
- Liv Lisa Fries - Safira
- David Berton - Boy 35
- Jörg Hartmann - Direktor Fredersen

== See also ==
- Boy 7 (Netherlands, 2015)
