= The Enclave =

- Written by: Alma Popeyus (writer); Hein Schütz(writer)
- Directed by: Willem van de Sande Bakhuyzen
- Starring: Ramsey Nasr; Johan Leysen; Frank Lammers; Nienke Römer
- Country of origin: Netherlands
- Original languages: Dutch; English; German

Production
- Running time: 150 minutes

Original release
- Release: 14 April 2002

The Enclave (De Enclave) is a three-part series directed by Willem van de Sande Bakhuyzen, about the fall of Srebrenica and the Dutch government's failure to protect the town from attackers. The series originally aired by Netherlands Public Broadcasting. The series was made in 2002. It has since been condensed into a movie and is regularly shown on US free satellite network LinkTV.

In the original series, each episode describes the Srebrenica massacre from one of three different points of view, including how the event continues to influence the characters. In the movie version, only two points of view were shown.

The following episode descriptions were taken from the Dutch Public Broadcasting website.

== Episode 1 ==
As a young Bosniak, Ibro Hadzic had worked as an interpreter for Dutchbat (Dutch UN peacekeeping force) at the time of the fall of Srebrenica. He has since built up a new life for himself and now is married to Sandra, a Dutchbatter (Dutch soldier), who is expecting his first child.

While working as an interpreter at the International Criminal Tribunal for the former Yugoslavia, Ibro is confronted with former Bosnian Serb officer Darko Bokan (Frank Lammers), who Ibro thinks is the man who murdered his family during the fall of Srebrenica. Ibro's past, bottled-up until now, comes back to haunt him as, with mounting obsession, he starts digging into Bokan's role in his family's murder.

== Episode 2 ==
When Ibro Hadzic learns that Darko Bokan will be acquitted due to lack of evidence, Ibro has other plans to try Darko. Ibro takes Bokan hostage and forces him to confess to what he "did" in the past while the world watched the events on television. Ibro then makes it clear that he wants the former Defence Minister George Terhoff, whom he holds responsible for losing his family, to change places with Bokan. Terhoff enters the room with police and arrests Ibro.

== Episode 3 ==
Former Defence Minister George Terhoff travels to Srebrenica with his wife and daughter. He is confronted with the consequences of the decisions he made at the time of the war. The sudden disappearance of his daughter forces him to start a search. As he passes through all the places that bear silent witness to the fall of Srebrenica, he remembers the traumatic hours he spent in the bunker where he was expected to make life and death decisions. He now experiences the frantic uncertainty that Ibro must have faced. He is eventually brutally confronted with his own past.

This episode was not included in the movie version.
