= Boy 7 (2015 Dutch film) =

2015 Dutch science fiction film

- Theatrical release poster
- Directed by: Lourens Blok
- Based on: Boy 7 by Mirjam Mous
- Produced by: Derk-Jan Warrink; Leontine Petit; Joost de Vries
- Starring: Matthijs van de Sande Bakhuyzen; Ella-June Henrard; Yannick Jozefzoon; Tygo Gernandt; Halina Reijn
- Cinematography: Jasper Wolf
- Production companies: Lemming Film; Proton Cinema; A Private View
- Distributed by: A-Film Benelux
- Release dates: February 9, 2015 (Boston SciFi Film Festival); February 19, 2015 (Netherlands)
- Running time: 88 minutes
- Country: Netherlands
- Language: Dutch
- Box office: $405,616

Boy 7 is a 2015 Dutch science fiction film directed by Lourens Blok. The film is based on the eponymous book by Mirjam Mous, but is not a literal adaptation of it. The story is set in a future version of the Netherlands, which has turned into a police state. The story is told in the form of flashbacks. The main roles are played by Matthijs van de Sande Bakhuyzen, Ella-June Henrard, Yannick Jozefzoon, Tygo Gernandt and Halina Reijn.

== Cast ==
- Matthijs van de Sande Bakhuyzen as Sam
- Ella-June Henrard as Lara
- Yannick Jozefzoon as Louis
- Tygo Gernandt as Zero
- Halina Reijn as Marit

== Production ==
Production company Lemming Film received 525.000 euro from the Netherlands Film Fund for their film adaptation of Mirjam Mous's Boy 7.

== Release ==
Boy 7 was first shown on 9 February 2015 at the Boston Science Fiction Film Festival. that same month it was also shown at the TIFF Next Wave Festival on February 15, 2015. It was released in Dutch theaters on February 19, 2015.

== See also ==
- Boy 7 (Germany, 2015), a German film based on the same book
