= Petra Laseur =

Dutch actress (1939–2025)

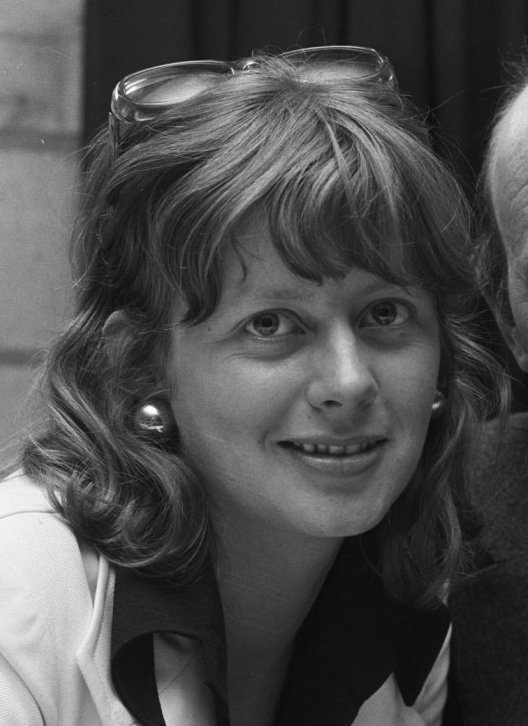
- Born: Petra Maria Laseur; 26 November 1939; Amsterdam, Netherlands
- Died: 11 April 2025 (aged 85); Amsterdam, Netherlands
- Occupation: Actress
- Years active: 1960–2017
- Spouse(s): Martin Veltman (1976–1995; divorced); Joes Herman Frans Oerlemans (1960–1975; divorced)
- Parent(s): Mary Dresselhuys; Cees Laseur

Petra Maria Laseur (26 November 1939 – 11 April 2025) was a Dutch theatre and film actress. She appeared in more than thirty films beginning in 1960. Daughter of Mary Dresselhuys and Cees Laseur, who divorced when she was five years old. She rarely saw her father after that as he had moved to The Hague.

In April 2024, Laseur announced she was terminally ill and did not want treatment. She died in Amsterdam on 11 April 2025, at the age of 85.

== Selected filmography ==
Year	Title	Role	Notes
1986	Dossier Verhulst	Nicolle Lebbink	
2001	Family	Els	
2005	Life!	Lies	
2008	Bride Flight		
