= Zuyd University of Applied Sciences =

University of Applied Sciences in the Netherlands

Coordinates: 50.88025°N 5.95953°E

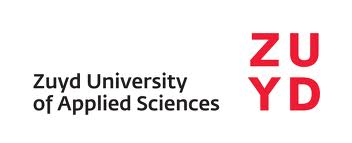
- Academic staff: 2,000+
- Students: 13,000
- Location: Heerlen, Sittard, and Maastricht, Netherlands
- Website: http://www.zuyd.nl

Zuyd University of Applied Sciences (Dutch: Zuyd Hogeschool) is a University of Applied Sciences with campuses in Heerlen, Sittard and Maastricht in the southeastern Netherlands.

The main focus of Zuyd University is on Bachelor programmes, 37 in total, most of them in Dutch. As of 2026, there are 10 master programmes.

In the 2008 edition of the Keuzegids Hoger Onderwijs ('Higher Education Guide'), Zuyd University takes first place of the 13 larger universities of applied sciences, with an average score of 6.85.

== Academics ==
Zuyd University is divided into the following domains:

- Arts
- Performing Arts
- Business & Law
- International Business & Communication
- Healthcare & Well-Being
- Hotel & Facility Management
- Technology

Zuyd University of Applied Sciences consists of the following faculties, at three locations:

Faculty	Location
Ergo therapy	Heerlen
Health and Technology	Heerlen
Logopedics	Heerlen
Nursing	Heerlen
Construction	Heerlen
Applied Science	Heerlen
ICT	Heerlen
Technology	Heerlen
Facility Management	Heerlen
Education	Heerlen/Maastricht
International Business & Communication (incorporating the Maastricht School of Translation and Interpreting)	Maastricht
Social Pedagogic Work	Maastricht
Social Pedagogic Work	Sittard
Social Work	Sittard
Hotel Management School	Maastricht
Academy of Music	Maastricht
Academy of Fine Arts	Maastricht
Academy of Media Design and Technology	Maastricht
Academy of Dramatic Arts	Maastricht
Academy of Architecture	Maastricht
Work and Law	Sittard
Marketing Management	Sittard
Academie Verloskunde Maastricht (University of Midwifery Education & Studies)	Maastricht

== See also ==
- Maastricht University
