= The Hidden Force =

1900 novel by Louis Couperus

- Author: Louis Couperus
- Original title: De Stille Kracht
- Translator: Alexander Teixeira de Mattos
- Language: Dutch
- Publisher: L.J. Veen
- Publication date: 1900
- Publication place: Netherlands
- English publication date: 1922
- Pages: 246

The Hidden Force (Dutch: De Stille Kracht) is a 1900 novel by the Dutch writer Louis Couperus. The narrative is set on the island of Java in the Dutch East Indies. The book was adapted into a 1974 Dutch TV serial. In 2010, a feature-film adaptation was announced as under development with Paul Verhoeven as director.

In 1985 E.M. Beekman published a revised edition of Alexander Teixeira de Mattos' translation dd 1921; a new translation by Paul Vincent came in 2012.

== See also ==
- 1900 in literature
- Dutch literature
- Kejawen
- https://www.complete-review.com/reviews/niederld/couperl3.htm
