= Peter Blok =

Dutch actor

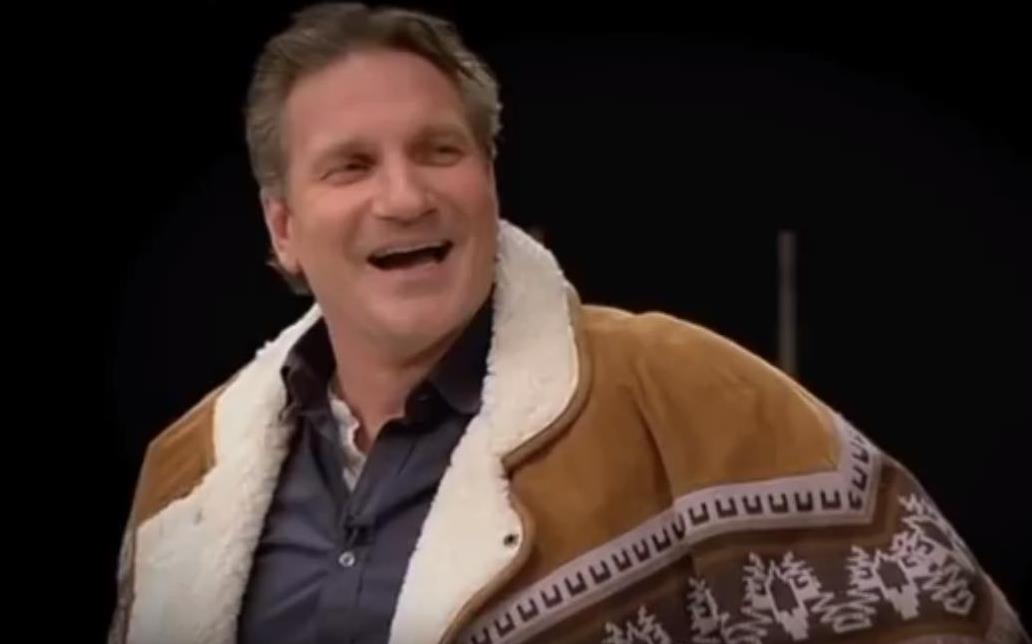
- Peter Blok in 2011
- Born: Peter Stephanus Blok; 7 April 1960 (age 66); The Hague, Netherlands
- Partner: Tjitske Reidinga

Peter Stephanus Blok (born 7 April 1960 in The Hague), known as Peter Blok, is a Dutch stage, television, film, and voice actor.

== Filmography ==
Year	Title	Role	Notes
1987	Caught	Dude	
1990	Crocodiles in Amsterdam	Makelaar	
1992	Traces of Smoke	De vragensteller	
1996	The Dress	De Vos	
1998	Scratches in the Table	Opa als jonge man	
2003	Cloaca	Tom	TV movie
2003	Klem in de draaideur	Paul Witteman	
2004	In Orange	Arend te Pas	
2004	Stille Nacht	Dekker	
2004	Onder controle		
2005	Leef!	Paul	
2006	Black Book	Van Gein	
2007	Love Is All	Narrator	Uncredited
2009	Gewoon Praten	Mark	
2011	Making Of	Peter	
2012	De verbouwing	Johan / Tessa's lover	
2012	Steekspel	Remco	
2016	Riphagen	Gert van der Veen	
2018	Doris	Dokter Schellekens	
2019	Penoza: The Final Chapter	Jack van Zon	
