= Mirjam Mous =

Dutch writer

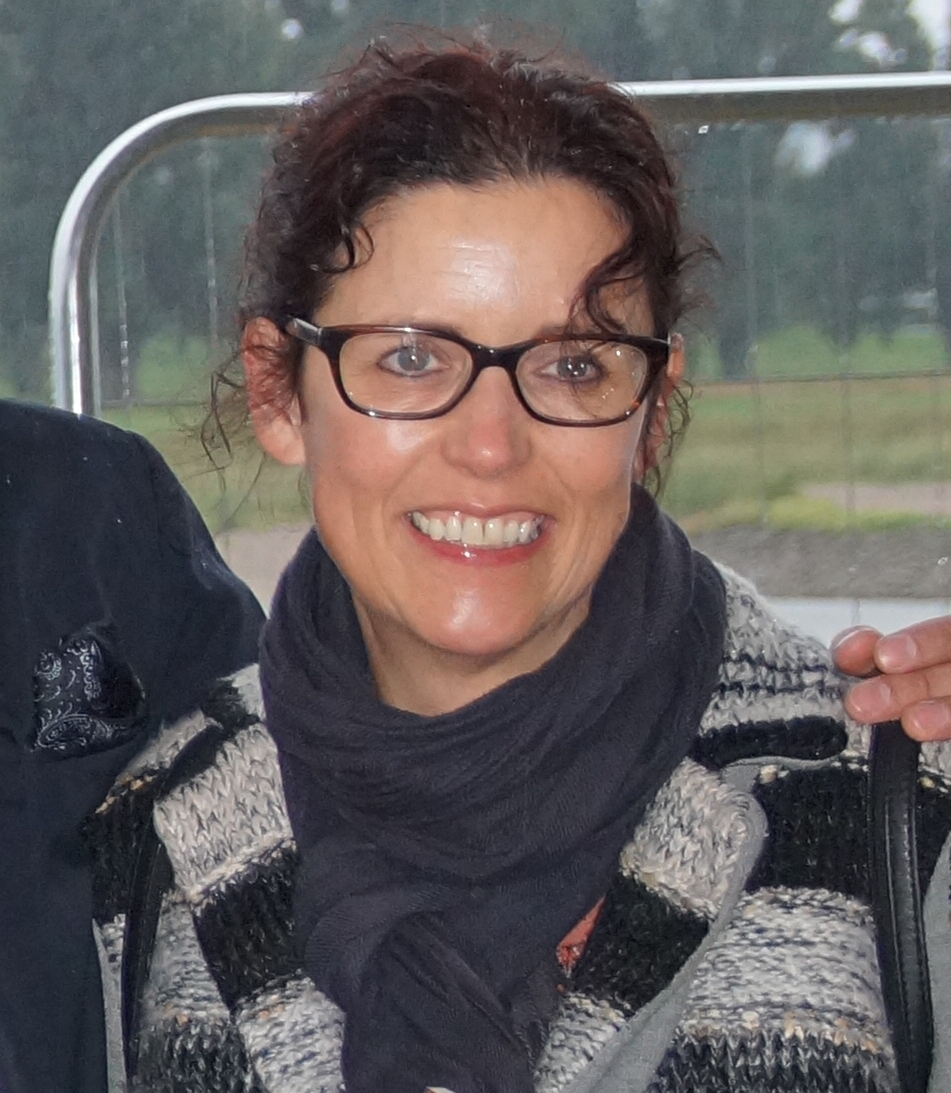
- Mirjam Mous at the Boy 7 movie in 2015
- Born: 7 November 1963 (age 63); Oosterhout, Netherlands
- Education: Pedagogische academie St. Frans
- Occupation: Author
- Years active: 1998–present
- Employer: Uitgeverij Unieboek
- Known for: Boy 7, De Strandtent series, Doorgeschoten
- Spouse: Wim
- Website: Mirjammous.nl

Mirjam Mous (born 7 November 1963) is a Dutch author of children's literature.

== Early life and education ==
Mous was born in Oosterhout, but raised in Made, Netherlands. Her father was painter Jac mous.

Mous studied to become a teacher in special education at the Pedagogische academie St. Frans in Breda.

== Career ==
Mous worked as a special education teacher at De Berkenhof in Breda for 20 years before becoming a full-time writer.

In 1998, she released her first book, titled Monsters mollen! It was swiftly followed by De juf is een heks.

Before becoming a full-time writer, Mous released many books, among which are Goed Fout! and Ouders te Koop. Doorgeschoten, based on the Columbine High School massacre, was released in 2004.

After she became a full-time writer in 2005, Mous continued to release many books. She also started two book series, De strandtent and Maffe Meiden.

In 2009, Mous published Boy 7. This book would be turned into a movie of the same title in 2015 and a German version would also be filmed.

== Bibliography ==
- Monsters mollen! een handleiding (1998)
- De juf is een heks (1998)
- Harige Harrie (1999)
- Allemaal nijlpaarden! (1999)
- Pistolen Paula (2000)
- Langejan (2000)
- Een loeder van een moeder (2000)
- Toontje Prins (2000)
- Soep met een luchtje (2001)
- Goed fout! (2001)
- Jammie mammie (2001)
- Een bloeddorstige meester (2002)
- Een bloedlink partijtje (2002)
- Tover-fanten (2002)
- Ouders te koop (2002)
- Moordmeiden (2002)
- De bloedneusbende (2003)
- Een bloot spook (2003)
- Prinses voor eventjes dan (2003)
- Zo groot als een reus (2003)
- Fluisterwater (2003)
- Het bos van Bloedbaard (2003)
- Dikke reus (2003)
- Alle Dagen Hartstikke druk (2004)
- Lange vingers (2004)
- Doorgeschoten (2004)
- De spiegeltje spiegeltje verkiezing (2004)
- Kaboutertjes bestaan wél! (2004)
- Boomkaas (2005)
- Hassan leest alles (2005)
- Waar is de schat? (2005)
- Ridder Eva (2005)
- De Strandtent 1: Over blozende wangen, bitterballen met mosterd, een aangebrande jongen en nog veel meer hete dingen (2005)
- Nat (2005)
- Een knoert van een fiets (2005)
- De club voor dieren in nood (2005)
- Glitters (2005)
- Een nacht in het oerwoud (2005)
- De Strandtent 2: Over jeugdpuistjes, aardbeien, de nieuwe seizoenkracht en nog veel meer pukkelige dingen (2005)
- De schat van Duizend-en-een-nacht (2006)
- De Strandtent 3: Over de bovenlip van Marscha, een vals rastameisje, een slimme hond en nog veel meer harige dingen (2006)
- De dierenambulance moet blijven! (2006)
- Detectivebureau Dennis & Duif/S.O.S. afz. Sofie (2007)
- De Strandtent 4: Over grijze dikbillen, swingen in een safarihotel, leeuwengympen en nog veel meer Afrikaanse dingen (2007)
- Maffe meiden (2007)
- Nee! (2007)
- De Strandtent 5: Over liefdesverdriet, erwtensoep met worst, foute pilletjes en nog veel meer snertdingen (2007)
- De ketting van één miljoen (2008)
- De zomer van Fay en Marscha : beleef het mee in De StrandTent (republishing of part 1 and 2 of 'De strandtent') (2008)
- Maffe meiden, maffer dan ooit (2008)
- Maffe meiden, 4ever maf (2009)
- Wat een held! (2009)
- Boy 7 (2009)
- Van soapster tot safarigirl: beleef het mee in De StrandTent (republishing of part 3 and 4 of 'De strandtent') (2009)
- Operatie hondendief (2010)
- Vals spel (2010)
- Operatie Nieuwsflits (2011)
- Een vampier die geen bloed lust (Een bloedlink partijtje/Een bloeddorstige meester/De bloedneusbende/Het bos van Bloedbaard) (2011)
- (G)één april (2011)
- Password (2012)
- Voor altijd vriendinnen! (2012)
- Spees de ruimtewees (2012)
- Deur dicht! (2013)
- Test. (2013)
- Wat een snertweer (2013)
- Opa Snor (2013)
- Het geheim van Berensbos (2014)
- Voor Saar! (2014)
- De boot van Bas (2014)
- De klas van juf Sam (2014)
- Op een onbewoondeiland (2014)
- Virus (2015)
- Lieke op safari (2015)
- 2C (2016)
- Wie verstopte een bom in de bus? (2016)
- H@ck, het instituut. (2019)
- H@ck: De kolonie (2020)
- Girl 6 (2021)
