= Willem van de Sande Bakhuyzen =

Dutch film director (1957–2005)

Willem Hendrik van de Sande Bakhuyzen (Arnhem, 13 November 1957 – Amsterdam, 27 September 2005) was a Dutch film director.

Born in Arnhem, the son of Nicolaas Jan van de Sande Bakhuyzen, he made his acting debut in the 1986 Academy Award-winning movie The Assault. His directing debut came in 1990, with the television series 12 steden, 13 ongelukken. He directed 16 movies in his career, many of which received international praise.

His movies won 21 awards and were nominated for an additional 11 awards. Of these, six awards and three nominations were for the Golden Calves. His 2001 art film Touch, and his 2002 television movie The Enclave were nominated for an Emmy Award.

== Death ==
Van de Sande Bakhuyzen died from cancer in Amsterdam in 2005, aged 47, the day before the premiere of his movie Life!. He was survived by his children, Matthijs and Roeltje, both actors.

== Filmography ==
=== Actor ===
- The Assault (1986; original title De Aanslag)
- De Orionnevel (1987)

=== Director ===
- Sop (1999; film for television)
- Zin (2001; film for television)
- Touch (2001; original title Lost)
- Family (2001; original title Familie)
- Kaas en noten (2002; film for television)
- The Enclave (2002; original title De Enclave, film for television)
- Hotel Bellevue (2003; film for television)
- Cloaca (2003; film for television)
- Embracing Time (2004; film for television)
- Lepel (2005)
- Leef! (2005)
- Ik Omhels Je Met 1000 Armen (2006)
