= Olowofoyeku =

Olowofoyeku (Yoruba: Olówòfóyèkù, pronounced [ōlówòfójèkù]) is a Yoruba surname in Nigeria, meaning 'the rich does not lack more titles'. Notable people with the surname include:

- Babatunji Olowofoyeku (1917–2003), Nigerian politician, educationist, lawyer and public servant
- Folake Olowofoyeku (born 1983), Nigerian actress and musician
- Tokunbo Olowofoyeku (born 1952), known as Toby Foyeh, British-Nigerian musician
