= Emmanuel Ohene Boafo =

Dutch-Ghanaian actor

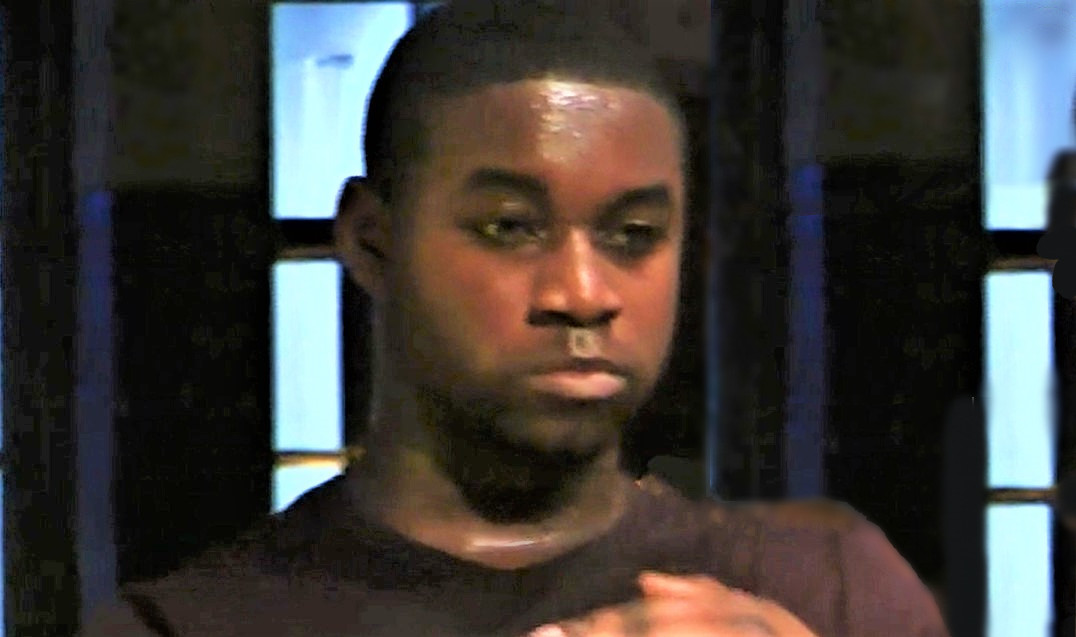
- Born: July 4, 1993 (age 32); Meppel, the Netherlands
- Education: Maastricht Academy of Dramatic Arts
- Occupation: Actor
- Years active: 2010–present
- Known for: Sea Wall, Dutch voice of Black Panther
- Awards: 2013: Golden Calf for Best Television Drama; 2017: Guido de Moor Prize; 2020: Henriëtte Hunstinx Award; 2021: Louis d'Or; 2022: Nomination Golden Calf for Best Supporting Role
- Website: IMDB profile

Emmanuel Ohene Boafo (born 4 July 1993) is a Dutch–Ghanaian actor. He plays the Dutch voice of Black Panther in the What if...? animation series and in 2021 he became the first black actor to win the prestigious Louis d'Or, for his version of the monologue Sea Wall. He was born in a Ghanaian family in the town of Meppel in the Netherlands.

== Early life ==
As a child he played the drums, but after seeing the play Backfire by youth theatre group Jong Rast, he wanted to become an actor. His parents were immigrants from Ghana.

== Acting career ==
His acting career started when he joined Jong Rast, led by artistic director Elike Roovers. To avoid a conflict with his father, he had promised to quit acting after a performance in the play I don't care, but was eventually cast for a role in the film Exit. The 2013 production awarded him a Golden Calf, and marked a change in his father's attitude. The following year, he was accepted to the Dutch theater school Toneelacademie Maastricht, which he attended from 2014 to 2018. During his studies, he did an internship at Het Nationale Theater (HNT), where he had a conflict with the director about his role in Meanwhile in Casblanca. He viewed his role as too "role-affirming." Despite the conflict, he was able to join the theater group after graduation. He appeared on stage in The reunification of the two Koreas by Eric de Vroedt, Cinema by Jeroen de Man, The world according to John, Sexual Healing and Trojan Wars, the latter performed by HNTjong. He won the Guido de Moor Prize in 2017.

From 2021 he played the role of war veteran Richard Mehciz in BNNVARA's drama series Thuisfront. He also played guest roles in the series Toon, De Maatschap, A'dam – E.V.A., Papadag and the movie The Paradise Suite. He played the Dutch voice for T'Challa in the animation series What If...?. The same year, he won the Louis d'Or, for his version of the monologue Seawall, which he performed in English. In the same year he decided to quit the HNT to focus on film and television roles. In 2022 he voiced Knuckles in the adventure film Sonic the Hedgehog 2.. In 2023 he voiced Gurley in the Dutch version of the live-action film Peter Pan & Wendy, Abat in the Dutch version of the animated series Star Wars: Visions on Disney+, Hobart “Hobie” Brown / Spider-Punk in the animated film Spider-Man: Across the Spider-Verse, and Arlong in the Dutch dub of Netflix series One Piece. In 2024 Boafa voiced Obasi in the film Mufasa: The Lion King and reprised his role as Knuckles the Echidna in the adventure film Sonic the Hedgehog 3. In 2026 he returned to the Dutch dub of the second season of the Netflix series One Piece to voice Kuromarimo.

=== Awards ===
Boafo won the following awards:

Year	Prize	Production
2013	Golden Calf for Best Television Drama	Exit (television drama)
2017	Guido de Moorprijs	Ondertussen in Casablanca (theatre play)
2020	Henriëtte Hustinxprijs	–
2021	Louis d'Or	Sea Wall (monologue)
2022	Nomination Golden Calf for Best Supporting Role	White Berry (film)
