= Louis d'Or (award) =

The Louis d'Or is a Dutch acting award, given annually to the actor with the most impressive leading role of the theater season. It is awarded by the Vereniging van Schouwburg- en Concertgebouwdirecties (VSCD), the main trade organisation for theaters in The Netherlands. The award itself is a golden medal, currently designed by Eric Claus. It was named after the Dutch actor Louis Bouwmeester. Its female counterpart is the Theo d'Or.

The Louis d'Or is awarded annually, along with the other VSCD stage awards, at the Gala of Dutch Theater in the Stadsschouwburg in Amsterdam.

== Jury ==
The jury is compiled of theater programmers, producers and critics, who have explicitly provided themselves in their relative disciplines. Jurors can take part of a jury for maximal six years. New jurors can be nominated by the jury itself or be appointed by the board of the VSCD.

== Award winners ==
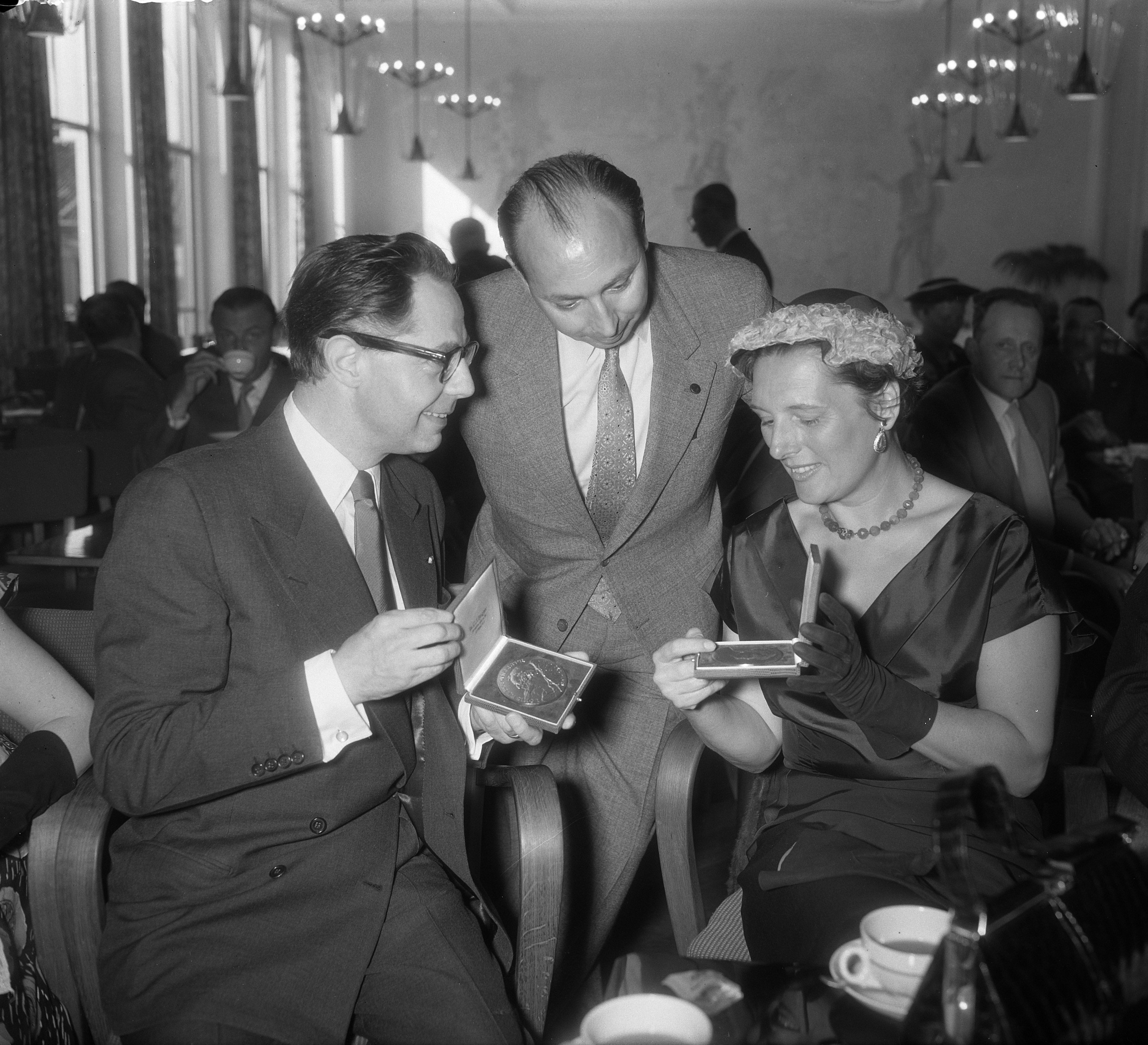
Louis d'Or 1955: Paul Steenbergen (left)

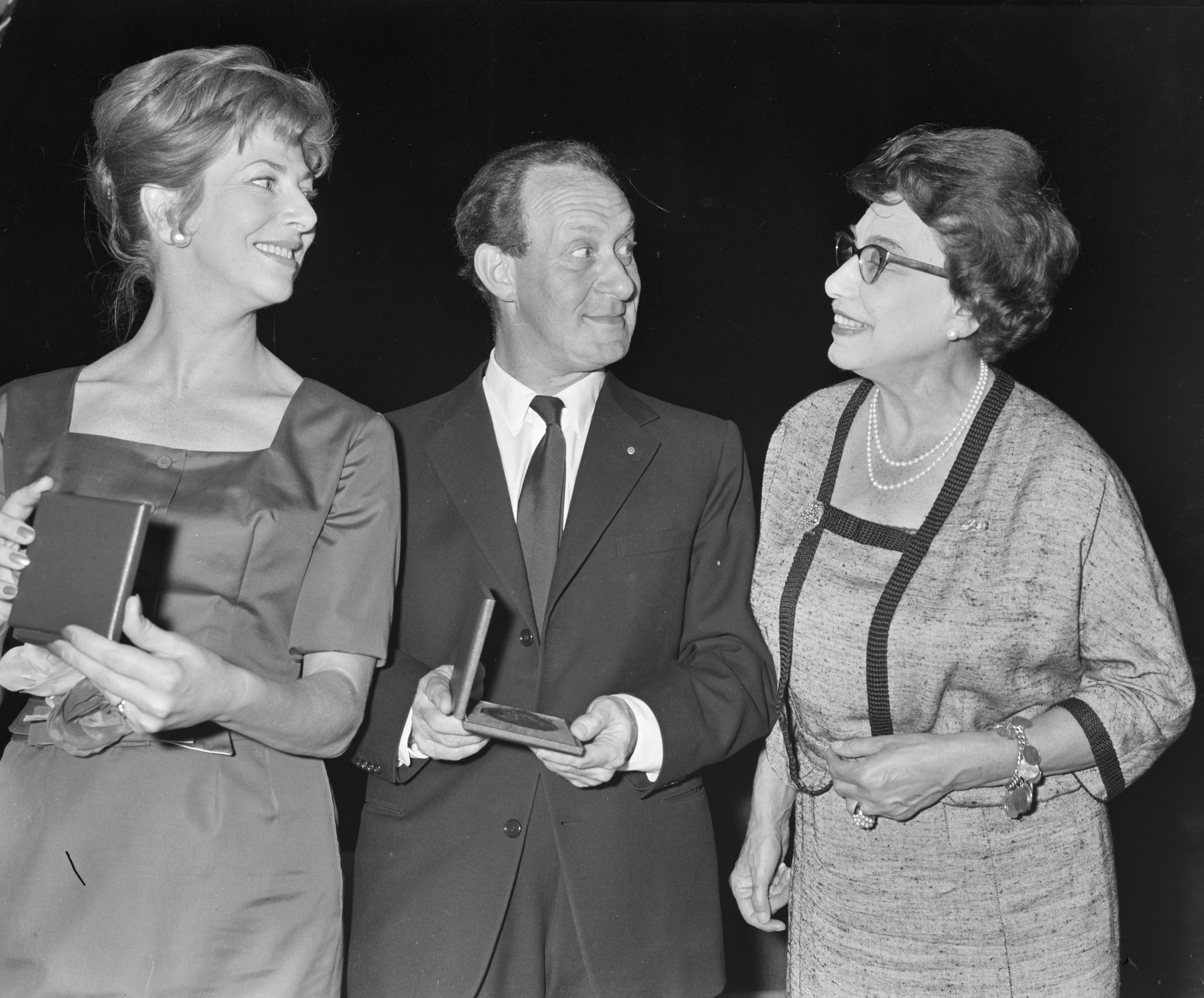
Louis d'Or 1961: Bob de Lange

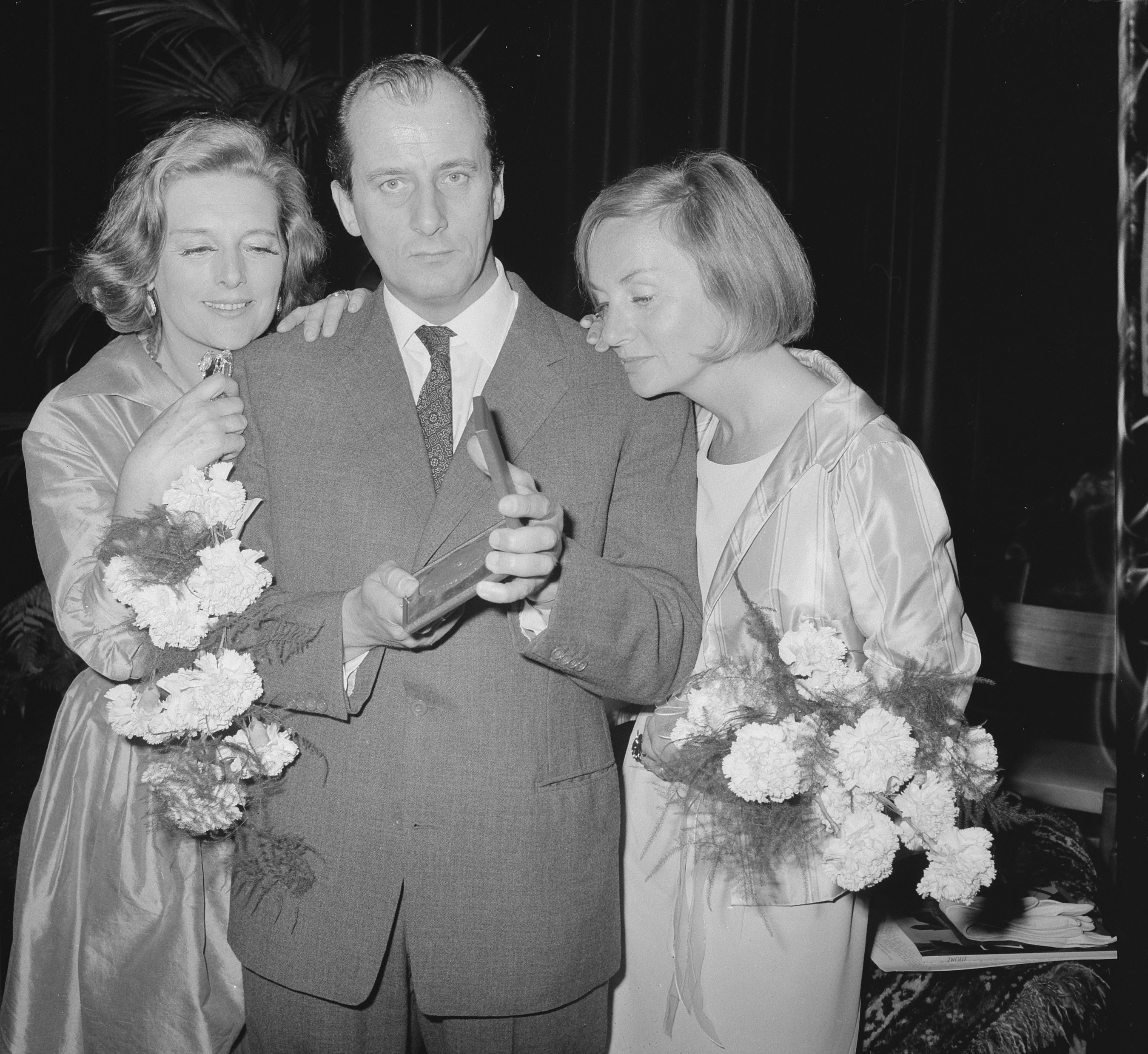
Louis d'Or 1963: Guus Hermus

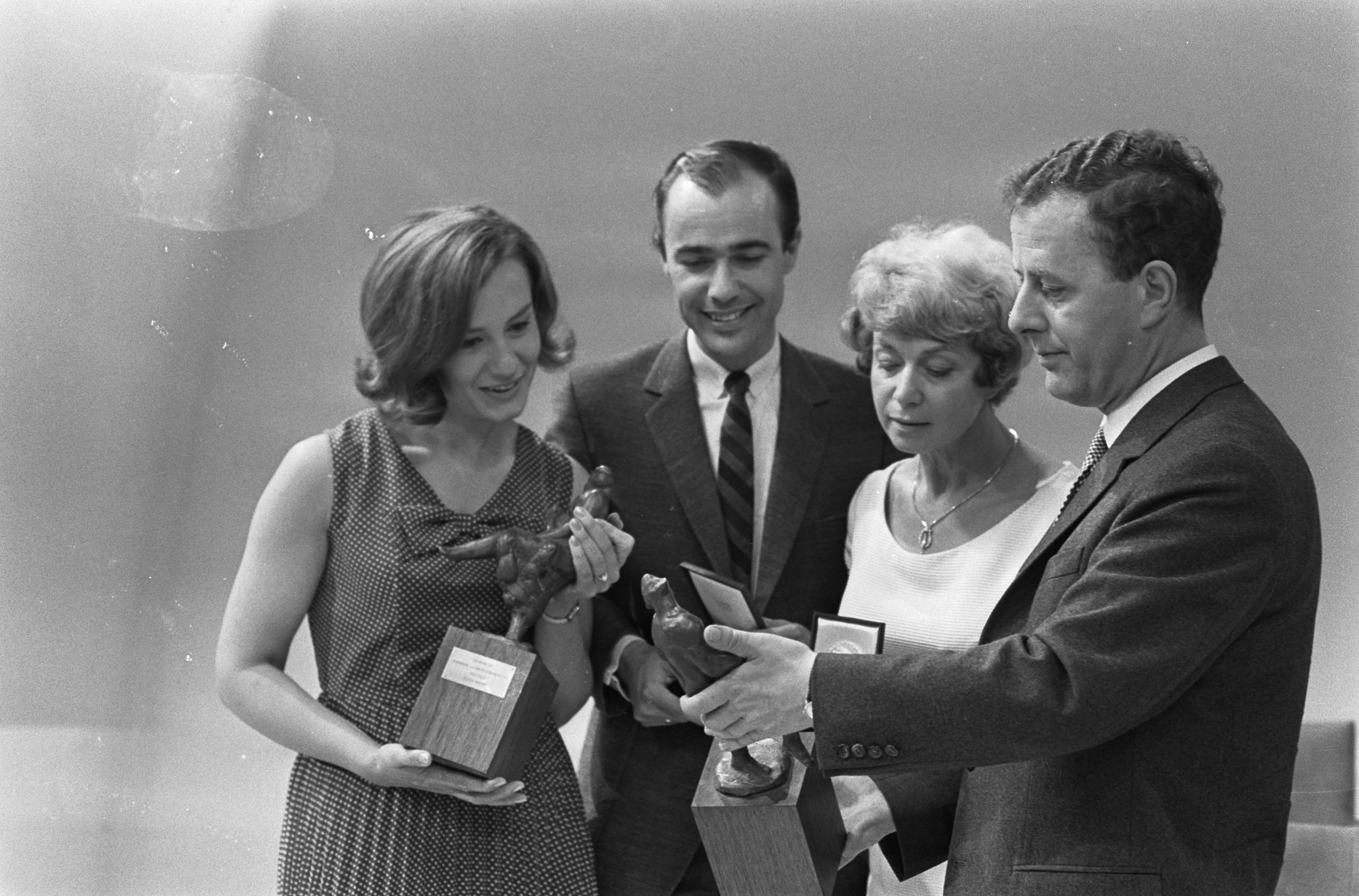
Louis d'Or 1967: Eric Schneider (centre)

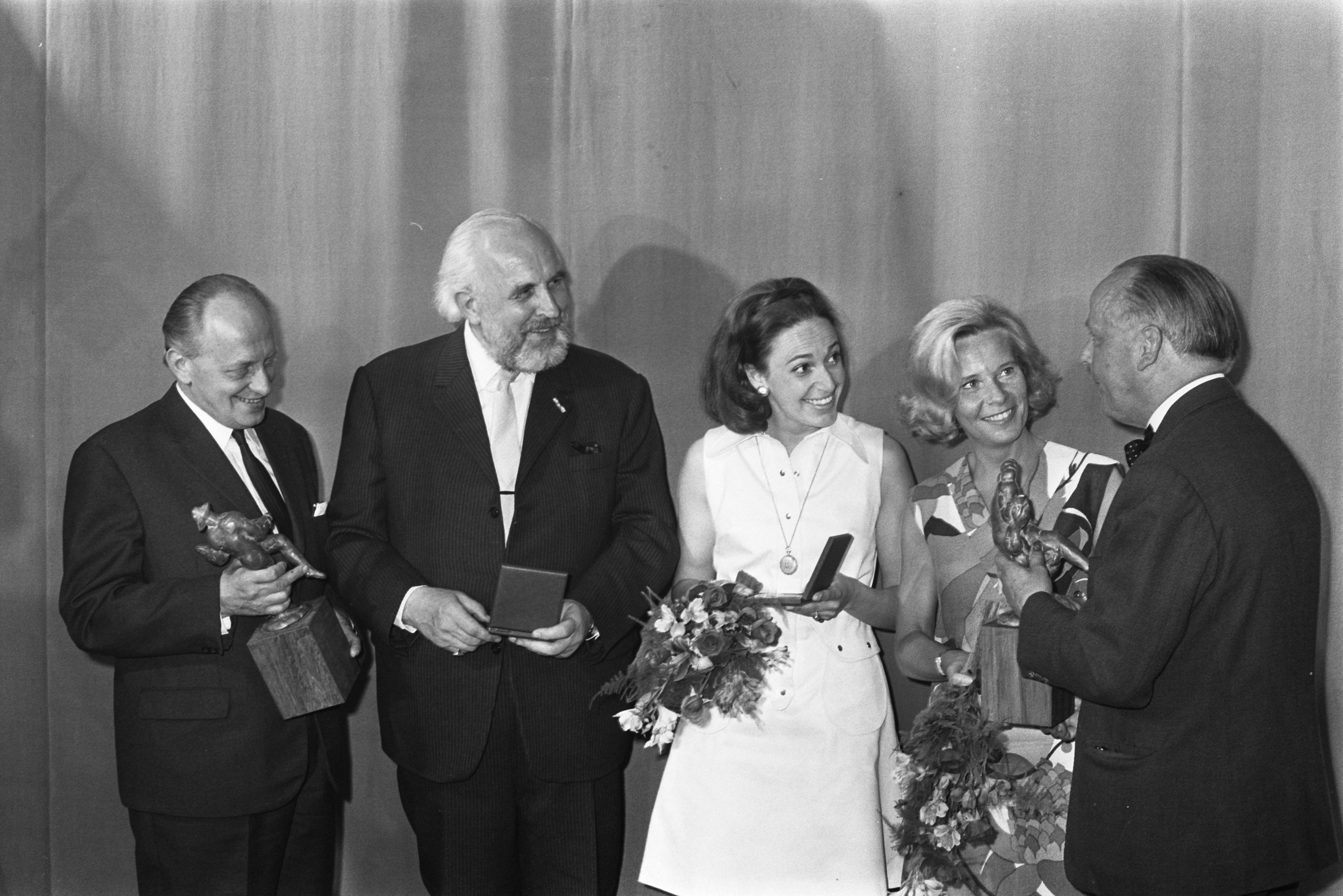
Louis d'Or 1969: Hans Tiemeyer (2nd left)

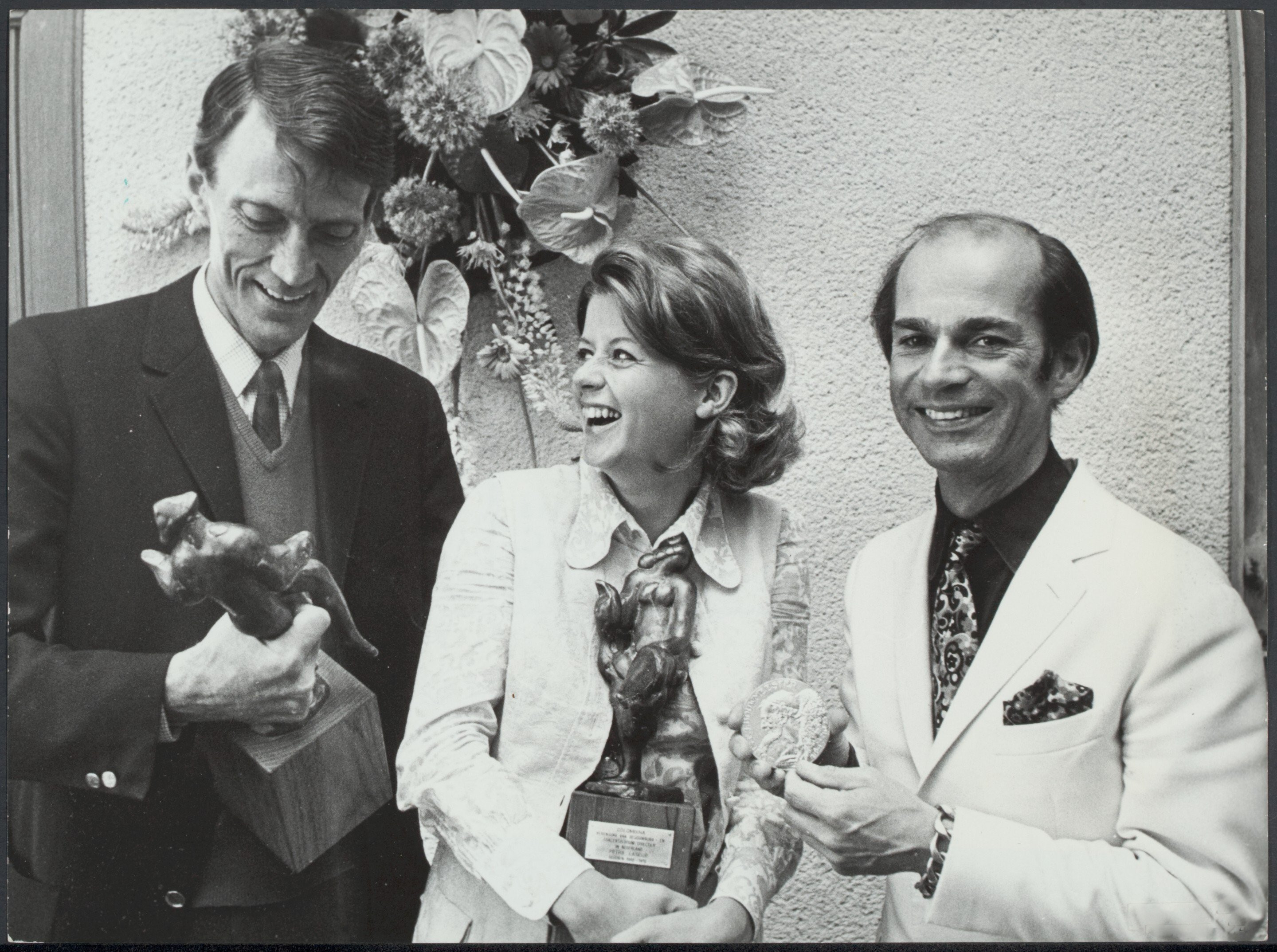
Louis d'Or 1970: Henk van Ulsen (right)

- 1955: Paul Steenbergen
- 1956: Han Bentz van den Berg
- 1957: Ko van Dijk
- 1958: Han Bentz van den Berg
- 1959: Paul Steenbergen
- 1960: Paul Steenbergen
- 1961: Bob de Lange
- 1962: not awarded
- 1963: Guus Hermus
- 1964: Han Bentz van den Berg
- 1965: Paul Steenbergen
- 1966: not awarded
- 1967: Eric Schneider
- 1968: Ton Lutz
- 1969: Hans Tiemeyer
- 1970: Henk van Ulsen
- 1971: Wim van der Grijn en Hans Dagelet
- 1972: Guido de Moor
- 1973: André van den Heuvel
- 1974: Siem Vroom
- 1975: Peter Faber on behalf of the Werkteater
- 1976: Peter van der Linden
- 1977: Carol Linssen
- 1978: Eric van der Donk
- 1979: Jules Croiset
- 1980: Hans Croiset
- 1981: Gees Linnebank
- 1982: Joop Admiraal
- 1983: Ton Lutz
- 1984: John Kraaijkamp sr.
- 1985: Siem Vroom
- 1986: Guido de Moor
- 1987: Guido de Moor
- 1988: Carol van Herwijnen
- 1989: Guido de Moor
- 1990: Peter Oosthoek
- 1991: Peter Faber
- 1992: André van den Heuvel
- 1993: Gijs Scholten van Aschat
- 1994: Pierre Bokma
- 1995: Warre Borgmans
- 1996: Victor Löw
- 1997: Herman Gilis
- 1998: Peter De Graef
- 1999: Lucas Van den Eynde
- 2000: Bram van der Vlugt
- 2001: Steven Van Watermeulen
- 2002: Edwin de Vries
- 2003: Bert Luppes
- 2004: Jeroen Willems
- 2005: Mark Rietman
- 2006: Joop Keesmaat
- 2007: Dirk Roofthooft
- 2008: Hans Kesting
- 2009: Bert Luppes
- 2010: Kees Hulst
- 2011: Jacob Derwig
- 2012: Hein van der Heijden
- 2013: Pierre Bokma
- 2014: Jacob Derwig
- 2015: Ramsey Nasr
- 2016: Hans Kesting
- 2017: Hans Croiset
- 2018: Bruno Vanden Broecke
- 2019: Ramsy Nasr
- 2020: not awarded
- 2021: Emmanuel Ohene Boafo
- 2022: Bram Suijker
