= John Kraaijkamp Sr. =

Dutch actor and comedian (1925–2011)

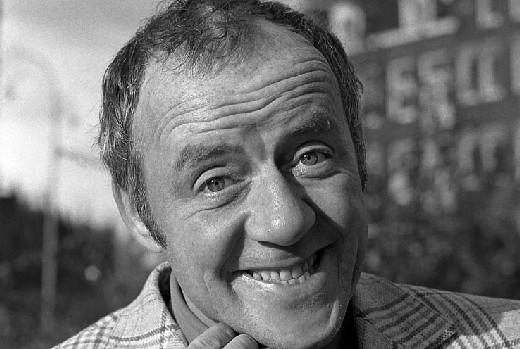
- Born: Jan Hendrik Kraaijkamp; 19 April 1925; Amsterdam, Netherlands
- Died: 17 July 2011 (aged 86); Laren, Netherlands
- Other names: John Kraaijkamp, Johnny Kraaijkamp, John Kraaykamp
- Occupations: Comedian, actor
- Years active: 1956–2007
- Children: John Kraaijkamp Jr.

Jan Hendrik "John" Kraaijkamp Sr. (19 April 1925 – 17 July 2011) was a Dutch Golden Calf and Louis d'Or winning actor, comedian and singer. For years, he formed a comedy team with Rijk de Gooyer. One of The Netherlands' most popular comedians, praised for his perfect timing, he also played in more serious plays, including the title role in King Lear (1979) and in the Academy Award-winning WWII drama film The Assault (1986). From 1993 until 2003, he starred in the successful sitcom "Het Zonnetje in Huis" along his son John Kraaijkamp Jr.

== Early life ==
Kraaijkamp was one of four children of a greengrocer and a housecleaner. He grew up in the Kinkerbuurt in Amsterdam. After an accident, his father was declared unfit for work and Johnny had to find work at a young age. At the age of 14, he already performed as a boy soprano in the famous Amsterdam theatre Carré.

== Career ==
=== With Rijk de Gooyer ===
Kraaijkamp worked for a short while as acrobat, but then moved on to become a singer in a show orchestra. He performed as an entertainer and bass player in local bars, where he was discovered in the 1950s by Rijk de Gooyer.

Together they recorded the song "Twee jongens op een gitaar" (Two guys on a guitar). It was the start of a long and successful partnership. John (then "Johnny") and Rijk began to perform together on radio and television. In spring 1956, they joined the "Weekendshow", an entertainment show from the broadcasting company AVRO which also included comedians Huub Matron and later René van Vooren. They also toured with the Snip & Snap Revue and perform in several comedy plays written for TV, together and apart.

In 1962, they got together again for Open het dorp, an extremely well-watched TV benefit marathon presented by Mies Bouwman, in which they performed in their pyjamas. In the 1960s and 1970s they performed regularly together on Dutch TV. In 1964, they began with the Johnny & Rijk shows (later called 'n Paar Apart). In 1968, they presented another "Weekendhow". In all these shows, Rijk was the "feeder" and John the comedian. Even when they worked apart, they held close contact. In 1963, John got his own TV show at the broadcasting company KRO, the Johnny Kraaijkamp Show, for which De Gooyer wrote. The duo also recorded a couple of hit singles, including "De Bostella", for which they received a golden record in 1968. From 1970 to 1971, they even had a show on German TV, Spass durch Zwei.

=== Solo work ===
In 1973, De Gooyer started a film career. Kraaijkamp didn't sit still, and made a couple of shows for the NCRV, with Tonny Huurdeman as his new feeder. Unfortunately, these were not very successful: the show only lasted three episodes. The TROS later produced a new series of Johnny Kraaijkamp Shows. De Gooyer performs in two episodes. In 1985, he joined old partner De Gooyer in the AVRO TV series De Brekers, which also starred Adèle Bloemendaal and Sacco van der Made. He also played in a couple of movies in the 1970s and 1980s, including Jos Stelling's De Wisselwachter and Fons Rademakers' The Assault (both 1986), as the bittered resistance fighter Cor Takes, and Iris (1987), with Monique van de Ven.

Kraaijkamp also was a prolific stage actor. With theatre company Ensemble he plays in The Taming of the Shrew from 1958 to 1959. From 1962 to 1964 he's a member of the Amsterdams Volkstoneel. He also starred in a couple of free productions, including musicals Irma la Douce (1962–1964) and Man of La Mancha (1969–1970). After a period of comic plays, he joined the Ro Theater in 1979 to play in a number of classic roles. The title role in Shakespeare's King Lear that year is considered his big breakthrough as a serious actor. He also performed in A Midsummer Night's Dream. In 1984 he won the Louis d'Or, the most prestigious award in stage acting in The Netherlands, for his lead role in Jacques de fatalist en zijn meester.

=== Later years ===
In 1986 he voiced Mr. Smee in a Dutch dub of Disney's Peter Pan. From 1988 until 1990, he starred in the prison sitcom Laat maar zitten, based on the British TV series Porridge. His most successful role in recent years was the part of Piet Boverkerk in the RTL comedy series Het zonnetje in huis (1993–2003). In the show, he played a pig-headed old man that comes to live with his son and daughter-in-law (played by his own son, John Kraaijkamp Jr., and Martine Bijl) after his wife died.

He continued to perform in various plays, including The Sunshine Boys (1994), along with his son, Harold Pinter's The Homecoming (2001), and Gouwe Handjes (2002–2003), which was written especially for him by Haye van der Heyden. In 2000, theater producer Joop van den Ende named a musical award after him. The John Kraaijkamp Musical Awards are awarded every year to musical actors and actresses. In recent years, his only public appearances were these gala shows, except for a brief role in the Dutch TV comedy series "Kinderen geen bezwaar" in 2007.

== Personal life ==
Kraaijkamp was married three times and had four children. With Riemada Elisabeth Panhuysen, he had two children, son John (1954) and daughter Ellissigne. With his second wife, Tilly van Duijkeren, he had a son, Michiel. With Mai Lun Lee he had a daughter, Sanne. John, Ellissigne and Sanne became actors.

Kraaijkamp spent his final years in the Rosa Spier Huis in Laren, in the room where famous Dutch comic book artist Marten Toonder used to live. His 85th birthday was celebrated there. Among the attendants were important Dutch comedians and television personalities including André van Duin, Rijk de Gooyer and Mies Bouwman.

== Death ==
Kraaijkamp died on 17 July 2011 in the Rosa Spier Huis in the presence of his children, his grand and great-grandchildren, his ex-wife and friends. He was 86 years old. The next day, several TV stations paid tribute to the comedian with TV specials. On Friday 22 July, the Dutch public bid him farewell in the recently renewed DeLaMar Theater. The next day, he was cremated.

== Awards ==
Throughout his life, Kraaijkamp received several acting awards, both for the stage, TV and film. In 1984, Kraaijkamp received the Louis d'Or for his role as Jacques in the play Jacques de fatalist en zijn meester. In 1986, he received the Golden Calf for Best Actor for his roles in the films The Assault and De Wisselwachter. The next year, in 1987, he was awarded with the Johan Kaartprijs for his contribution to stage comedy and entertainment. In 1998, he received a Gouden Beeld, a television award, for Best Actor in a Comedy for his role in Het Zonnetje in Huis. On 21 October 2007 he received the Blijvend Applaus Prijs for his exceptional contribution to Dutch theater, television and film.
