= The Pointsman =

- Theatrical release poster
- Directed by: Jos Stelling
- Screenplay by: Jos Stelling; George Brugmans; Hans de Wolf
- Based on: De wisselwachter by Jean-Paul Franssens
- Produced by: Jos Stelling; Stanley Hillebrandt
- Cinematography: Theo van de Sande
- Edited by: Rimko Haanstra
- Music by: Michel Mulders
- Production company: Jos Stelling Filmproducties B.V.
- Distributed by: Concorde Film
- Release date: 18 September 1986
- Running time: 96 minutes
- Country: Netherlands
- Languages: Dutch; French

The Pointsman (Dutch: De wisselwachter) is a 1986 Dutch film directed by Jos Stelling, starring Jim van der Woude, Stéphane Excoffier and John Kraaijkamp, Sr. It tells the story of a French woman who moves in with a Dutch railwayman at a remote railway station. The two are unable to converse, but soon begin a strange game of seduction. The film is based on the novel De wisselwachter by Jean-Paul Franssens.

Kraaijkamp was awarded the Golden Calf for Best Actor for his performance in the film.

== Plot ==
A French woman gets off a train by mistake at a remote location. She tries to ask the pointsman for help, but the two do not understand each other's languages. She waits for another train to arrive, but it never happens.

She eventually moves in with the man at the station. Without being able to speak, the two begin to develop a relationship over the next few months.

== Production ==
The movie was filmed at Corrour Station, Rannoch Moor, in the Scottish Highlands with Scotrail providing use of the trains.

The interior shots were taken in the Netherlands where a scale replica of the Corrour Station interior was constructed in a garage of the Jongeneel timber yard on the Zeedijk in Utrecht, Netherlands.

== Cast ==
- Jim van der Woude as the pointsman
- Stéphane Excoffier as the woman
- John Kraaijkamp, Sr. as the machinist
- Josse De Pauw as the mailman
- Ton van Dort as the machinist's assistant

== Reception ==
=== Critical response ===
Janet Maslin of The New York Times described the film as "a mixture of strange, inchoate passions and even stranger Dutch humor, and there is little about it to capture the imagination. The characters and their actions are inscrutable, made even more so by the near-total absence of dialogue. The film's empty, mutable vistas (the exteriors were shot in Scotland) look good but evoke very little." Time Out London wrote: "Taking no account of plausibility, Stelling's exploration of the uses and abuses of power is art house fare, but neither obscure nor elitist. Enthralling performances generate a claustrophobic tension, but there's humour too."

=== Accolades ===
Award	Category	Recipient(s)	Result
Brussels International Fantastic Film Festival	Silver Raven	Jos Stelling	Won
Fantasporto	Audience Jury Award	Jos Stelling	Won
Fantasporto	Best Actor	Jim van der Woude	Won
Netherlands Film Festival	Golden Calf for Best Actor	John Kraaijkamp, Sr.	Won
Netherlands Film Festival	Special Jury Prize	Jos Stelling	Won
São Paulo International Film Festival	Audience Award for Best Feature	Jos Stelling	Won
43rd Venice International Film Festival	Venice Authors Prize - Special Mention	Jos Stelling	Won
