= Ton Lutz =

Dutch actor and artistic leader (1919–2009)

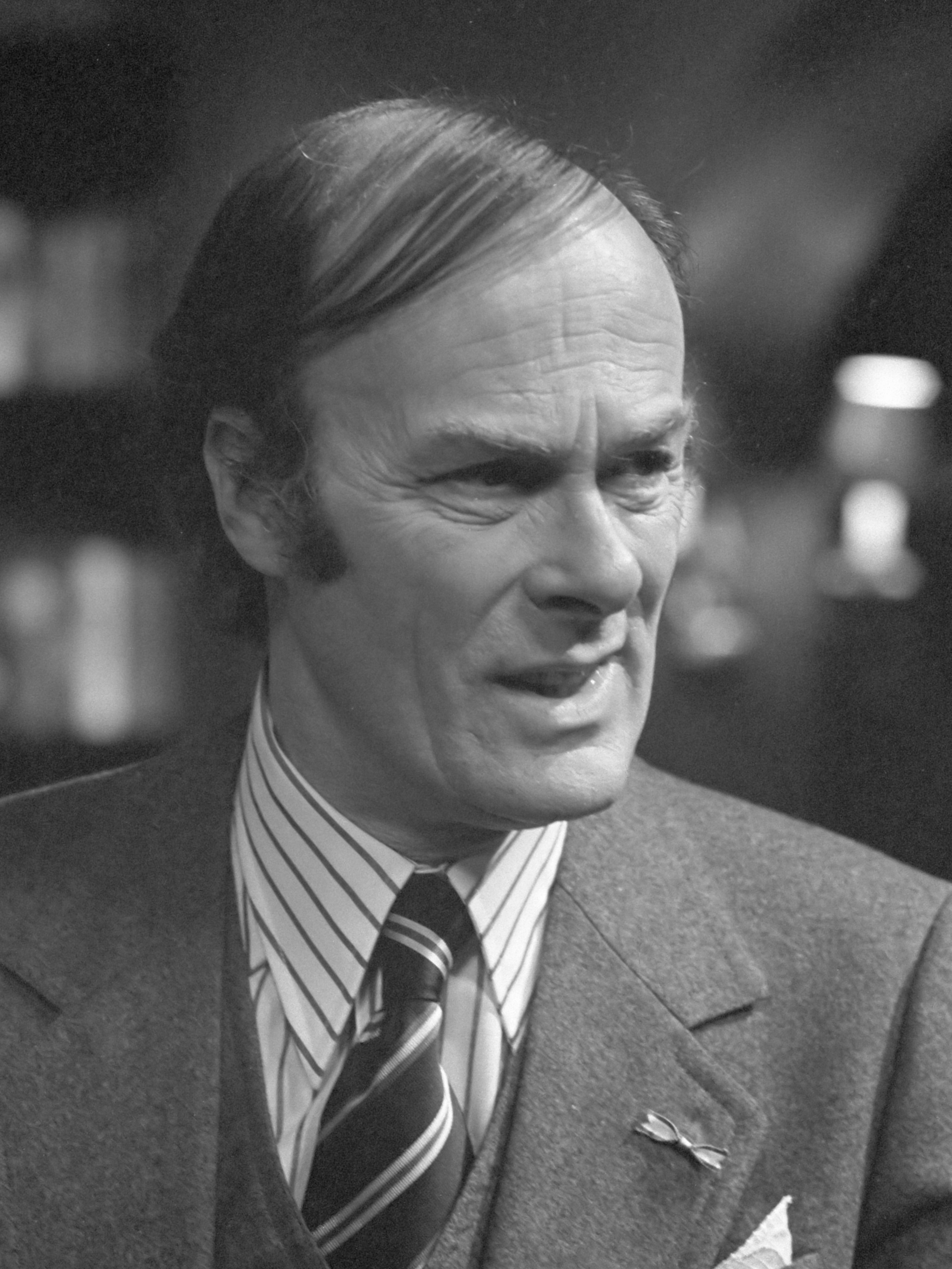
- Ton Lutz in 1974
- Born: Antonius Cornelis Lutz; 17 June 1919; Delft, Netherlands
- Died: 3 May 2009 (aged 89); Amsterdam, Netherlands

Antonius Cornelis "Ton" Lutz (17 June 1919, in Delft – 3 May 2009, in Amsterdam) was a Dutch actor and artistic leader. His two younger brothers, Luc and Pieter, were also actors, as well as his nephew Joris Lutz. He was married to actress Ann Hasekamp.

Twice, in 1968 and 1983, he was awarded the Louis d'Or, the Dutch prize for the best Dutch actor of the year. In later years, 1993–2002, he appeared mostly in television productions.

== Life ==
After finishing high school, Lutz worked as a reporter for the Nieuwe Delftse Courant newspaper in Delft, where eventually he found himself assigned to write the theater reviews. During World War II, he tried to join the repertoire group at the Royal Theatre in The Hague, known as the Residentie Tooneel, but was rejected. Instead, he was accepted for training at the Amsterdam Theatre School in 1944, but the program was shut down by the war.

After liberation Lutz went to work as a radio announcer in Groningen. Subsequently, he worked as an actor for various theatre companies, including the Nederlands Volkstoneel (Dutch People's Theatre), Toneelgroep Comedia (Theatre Comedia), De Nederlandse Comedie (The Dutch Comédie), the Rotterdam Theatre, Zuidelijk Toneel Globe (Southern Globe Theatre) and the Publiekstheater (Public's Theatre).

== Filmography ==
Year	Title	Role	Notes
1958	Fanfare	Altena	
1968	De vijanden	Duitse soldaat	
1970	Champagne Rose är död	Franco	
1982	Het verleden	Dhr. Huisman	
1986	In de schaduw van de overwinning	Verzetsman	

== Awards ==
- 1963 Louis d'Or
- 1983 Louis d'Or
- 1984 Lutz was knighted by the Dutch crown into the Order of Orange-Nassau.
