= Henk van Ulsen =

Dutch actor (1927–2009)

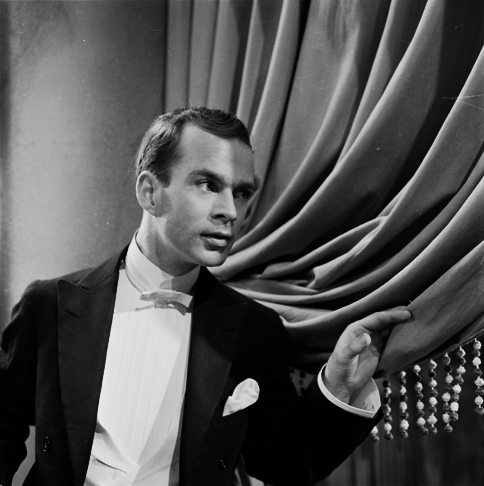
Henk van Ulsen in "Invitation to the Castle" (1957)

Henk van Ulsen (8 May 1927, Kampen – 28 August 2009, Bussum) was a Dutch actor. He won the Louis d'Or for best male stage actor in 1970.
