= Folake Olowofoyeku =

Nigerian actress (born 1983)

- Fọlákẹ́ Olówòfóyèkù
- Born: 26 October 1983 (age 42); Lagos, Nigeria
- Other name: The Folake
- Occupations: Actress; musician
- Years active: 2002–present
- Parents: Babatunji Olowofoyeku (father); Felicia Olowofoyeku (mother)
- Relatives: Toby Foyeh (brother)
- Website: thefolake.com

Folake Olowofoyeku (Yoruba: Fọlákẹ́ Olówòfóyèkù, pronounced [fɔ̄lákɛ́ ōlówòfójèkù]; born 26 October 1983) is a Nigerian actress and musician. She starred in the Chuck Lorre CBS sitcom Bob Hearts Abishola.

== Early life, family and education ==
Olowofoyeku was born in Nigeria to Nigerian politician Babatunji Olowofoyeku and his wife Felicia. The youngest of 20 children, she was named after the first female Senior Advocate of Nigeria, Folake Solanke. One of her older brothers is the musician and guitarist Toby Foyeh. Olowofoyeku has spoken about the importance of names in Yoruba culture. Her first name means 'to use non-monetary wealth to pamper', and her surname means 'a rich man uses a chieftaincy title to top off their wealth'.

She was raised on Victoria Island in Lagos, Nigeria, and also spent time in London, England.

Olowofoyeku attended Igbinedion Education Centre, a Montessori boarding school in Benin City. She then transferred to Vivian Fowler Memorial College for Girls in Ikeja, Lagos and then attended Oxbridge Tutorial College.

In 2001, at the age of 18, Olowofoyeku emigrated to the United States, where she came to live with her sister.

Although initially studying economics in anticipation of becoming an attorney, Olowofoyeku received a B.A. in theater from City College of New York. While she was a student at City College, she played NCAA Division III college basketball for the CCNY Beavers.

== Career ==
After graduating from college, Olowofoyeku got her start in off-Broadway theater in New York City. Her performances in the feature films When They Could Fly (2006) and Central & Broadway (2018) earned her the award for Best Actress at, respectively, the ReelHeART International Film Festival in Toronto and the CinéFashion Film Awards.

Olowofoyeku appeared in guest starring roles on television shows that include 30 Rock, How to Get Away with Murder, Law & Order: Criminal Intent, Law & Order: Special Victims Unit, Modern Family, Westworld, and White Collar.

Olowofoyeku starred in the 2017 film Death Race 2050 as Minerva Jefferson. The film is a sequel to the 1975 cult film, Death Race 2000, and was shot in Lima, Peru. Also in 2017, Olowofoyeku appeared opposite Gaby Hoffmann in the last season of the TV series Transparent, as her love interest, Lyfe.

Since September 2019, Olowofoyeku has played Abishola opposite American comedian Billy Gardell in the Chuck Lorre CBS sitcom, Bob Hearts Abishola. Lorre created the show with British-Nigerian comedian Gina Yashere, who writes for the show and plays Abishola's best friend, Kemi. Bob Hearts Abishola premiered in 2019 and is the first American sitcom to feature a Nigerian family. On January 25, 2023, the sitcom was renewed for a fifth and final season which began airing on February 12, 2024.

== Music ==
Olowofoyeku plays Afro-beat electronic music under the moniker The Folake. She plays guitar and piano. She has also worked as a sound engineer and a DJ. Olowofoyeku has a diploma in audio engineering from the Institute of Audio Research.

In 2013, Olowofoyeku appeared in two David Bowie videos as his bass guitar player: "The Stars (Are Out Tonight)" and "The Next Day". Both videos were directed by Floria Sigismondi. Tilda Swinton portrays Bowie's wife in "The Stars", and "Next Day" features actors Gary Oldman and Marion Cotillard. Olowofoyeku said that director Sigismondi and Bowie worked with the band so they could learn their parts musically in rehearsal, as well as portray themselves in the videos.

== Personal life ==
Olowofoyeku speaks fluent Yoruba and English. She resides in Los Angeles. She is a big fan of science fiction and the work of Octavia Butler, and counts Butler's 1980 book, Wild Seed, as a favorite. Her nephew Toluwalakin Olowofoyeku was one of the three on Kugali team that created the Nigerian animated mini-series Iwájú, released on Disney+ in February 2024.

== Filmography ==
=== Film ===
Year	Title	Role	Notes
2003	Protesters	Felice Falafafull	Video
2006	When They Could Fly	Bella	Short
2008	10,000 A.D.: The Legend of a Black Pearl	Plaebian 3	Video
2008	Staged Archive	Judge	Short
2008	In Search of Myster Ey	Waitress	Satire / Comedy / Biography / Mystery / Thriller / Drama
2009	The Child Within	Omo	Drama
2011	The Beaver	Nurse	Drama
2012	Hellbenders	Serena Venter	
2014	Gideon's Cross	Mona Madugu (Nigerian Boss)	Voice, short
2014	Kepler X-47	Alien Sentinel	Short
2016	Female Fight Squad	Winter	
2017	Death Race 2050	Minerva Jefferson	Video
2018	Central & Broadway	Leon	Short
2018	The Bride	-	Short
2018	Armed	Frida	
2024	Mufasa: The Lion King	Amara	Voice

=== Television ===
Year	Title	Role	Notes
2005	Law & Order: Special Victims Unit	Amina Asante	Episode: "Night"
2010	30 Rock	Jamaican Nurse #2	Episode: "Anna Howard Shaw Day"
2010	Law & Order: Criminal Intent	Princess Timiro	Episode: "Loyalty: Part 1 & 2"
2010	White Collar	Teller	Episode: "By the Book" & "Unfinished Business"
2011	Law & Order: Special Victims Unit	Adisa	Episode: "Scorched Earth"
2014	Modern Family	Ayoola	Episode: "Marco Polo"
2016	How to Get Away with Murder	Desk Nurse	Episode: "There's My Baby"
2016	Westworld	Surveillance Tech	Episode: "Dissonance Theory"
2017	Colony	Redhat	Episode: "Panopticon"
2017	The Gifted	Scar	Episode: "rX"
2017	Transparent	Lyfe	Recurring cast: season 4
2019	The Filth	Charlotte	Episode: "Filthy Bro Day"
2019–2024	Bob Hearts Abishola	Abishola Wheeler	Main cast
2026	The Walking Dead: Dead City	The Trader	Episode: "Found/Lost"

=== Video games ===
Year	Title	Role	Notes
2018	World of Warcraft: Battle for Azeroth		
2019	Vader Immortal: A Star Wars VR Series - Episodes I, II, and III	Priestess	

=== Music videos ===
Year	Title	Artist	Notes
2013	The Stars (Are Out Tonight)	David Bowie	Bassist
2013	The Next Day	David Bowie	Bassist

== Theater ==
- 2004: Trojan Women by Euripides at Classical Theatre of Harlem (2 April 2004)
- 2009: Punk Roc/Love Song (Horse Trade Theater Group) at Kraine Theater (30 September – 3 October 2009)

== Discography ==
- 2012: The.Folake! (self-released)
