= Mufasa: The Lion King =

2024 film by Barry Jenkins

- Theatrical release poster
- Directed by: Barry Jenkins
- Screenplay by: Jeff Nathanson
- Based on: Disney's The Lion King by: Irene Mecchi; Jonathan Roberts; Linda Woolverton
- Produced by: Adele Romanski; Mark Ceryak
- Starring: Aaron Pierre; Kelvin Harrison Jr.; Seth Rogen; John Kani; Billy Eichner; Tiffany Boone; Donald Glover; Mads Mikkelsen; Thandiwe Newton; Lennie James; Anika Noni Rose; Blue Ivy Carter; Beyoncé Knowles-Carter
- Cinematography: James Laxton
- Edited by: Joi McMillon
- Music by: Dave Metzger (score) (Note: Original The Lion King themes by Hans Zimmer); Lin-Manuel Miranda (songs)
- Production company: Walt Disney Pictures
- Distributed by: Walt Disney Studios; Motion Pictures
- Release dates: December 9, 2024 (Dolby Theatre); December 20, 2024 (United States)
- Running time: 118 minutes
- Country: United States
- Language: English
- Budget: $200 million
- Box office: $723 million

Mufasa: The Lion King is a 2024 American musical drama film produced by Walt Disney Pictures. The photorealistically animated film serves as a prequel and sequel to The Lion King (2019), which itself is a remake of the 1994 animated film. Directed by Barry Jenkins from a screenplay written by Jeff Nathanson, the film's cast includes Seth Rogen, Billy Eichner, Donald Glover, Beyoncé Knowles-Carter, and John Kani reprising their roles from the remake; new cast members include Aaron Pierre, Kelvin Harrison Jr., Tiffany Boone, Mads Mikkelsen, Thandiwe Newton, Lennie James, Anika Noni Rose, and Blue Ivy Carter in her feature film debut. It features Rafiki recounting to Simba and Nala's cub, Kiara, the history of Mufasa, including how he first met Scar and other allies, his battle against a renegade pride of white lions, and the journey that led him to become King of the Pride Lands.

Development on a prequel to The Lion King was confirmed in September 2020, with Jenkins attached to direct and Nathanson finishing a draft of the script. Pierre and Harrison were announced as the voice cast in August 2021, followed by further casting between September 2022 and April 2024. The film was officially announced when its official title was revealed in September 2022 at the 2022 D23 Expo announcement. Production on the film slowed down in July 2023 due to the 2023 SAG-AFTRA strike. The film is dedicated to James Earl Jones, the voice of Mufasa in the 1994 film and remake, who died three months before the film's release; as a tribute, his voice is heard briefly during the opening titles.

Mufasa: The Lion King premiered on December 9, 2024, at the Dolby Theatre in Los Angeles, and was distributed in the United States by Walt Disney Studios Motion Pictures on December 20. The film received mixed reviews from critics who praised the visual effects, vocal performances, and Jenkins' direction but were critical of the screenplay. It grossed $723 million, making it the sixth-highest-grossing film of 2024.

== Plot ==
Some time after Simba defeated his usurping uncle Scar and became King of the Pride Lands, (Note: As depicted in The Lion King (2019)) he and Nala have a daughter, Kiara, and are expecting another cub. They leave for an oasis for the birth, leaving Timon and Pumbaa to watch over Kiara. Rafiki visits them and recounts the story of Kiara's grandfather Mufasa, with Timon and Pumbaa adding color commentary.

Years before, as a cub, Mufasa lives with his parents, Masego and Afia, in a coastal desert while dreaming of the legendary Milele, a lush oasis. A flash flood rages, seemingly killing the couple, and sweeps Mufasa into a wetland where he meets Taka, a royal cub. After surviving an attack by young crocodiles, Mufasa is accepted by Taka's mother Queen Eshe but tested by King Obasi, who races Taka and Mufasa to a dried tree to decide his fate. Taka deliberately loses so Mufasa can stay.

As time passes, the two brothers grow close, although Obasi prejudices outsiders. During a hunt on herd of oryxes, Mufasa kills one of two attacking white lions; the survivor warns Kiros, leader of the outcast Outsiders, who seek revenge for the death of the king’s son, Shaju. At Eshe and Obasi's urging, Taka and Mufasa flee so the former can continue Obasi's bloodline in a new kingdom elsewhere. King Kiros, along with his sisters Akua and Amara, leads an assault on Obasi's pride; massacring Obasi, Eshe, and their lions.

After escaping the pursuing Outsiders, the pair meet Sarabi, her hornbill scout Zazu, and a young Rafiki. Rafiki, guided by visions of reuniting with a brother, leads them toward Milele. Knowing that Mufasa is still alive, the Outsiders catch up to the group, forcing Sarabi to throw a beehive and cause an elephant stampede so they can escape. Taka falls for Sarabi but grows jealous when Mufasa saves her during the stampede. Out of loyalty, Mufasa credits Taka with Sarabi's rescue. As they travel through snowy mountains, Sarabi admits she knows Mufasa saved her, and the two fall in love. Feeling betrayed, Taka allies with Kiros, secretly leaving a trail for the Outsiders to follow his group.

At Milele, Rafiki identifies Mufasa as his "brother" from the vision. The Outsiders arrive to attack, and Mufasa discovers Taka's betrayal while battling Kiros in a full most swing. Trapped in a cave, Mufasa is nearly killed by Kiros until, upon realizing what he has done, a remorseful Taka intervenes. Kiros slashes across Taka's eye, leaving a scar. As the animals of Milele are rallied to battle the Outsiders by Mufasa, an earthquake strikes that kills most of the Outsiders, while Kiros drags Mufasa into an underwater cavern. A rockfall allows Mufasa (remembering Eshe's earlier advice) to defeat Kiros, and Taka saves Mufasa from drowning, fighting off the urge to drown him. Sarabi retrieves Mufasa from the cave but is aghast at Taka's actions.

After defeating Kiros, Mufasa becomes King of Milele and reunites with a surviving Afia, learning Masego has died in the flood. Taka apologizes to Mufasa, and his brother forgives him and allows him to stay but vows to never speak Taka's name again for his betrayal, prompting Taka to adopt the name "Scar" so he will never forget what he's done. Mufasa ascends the newly created and named Pride Rock and roars over his kingdom.

In the present, Kiara roars into the sky as Mufasa's spirit watches. Kiara reunites with Simba and Nala and meets her newborn brother, offering to tell him their grandfather's story.

== Voice cast ==
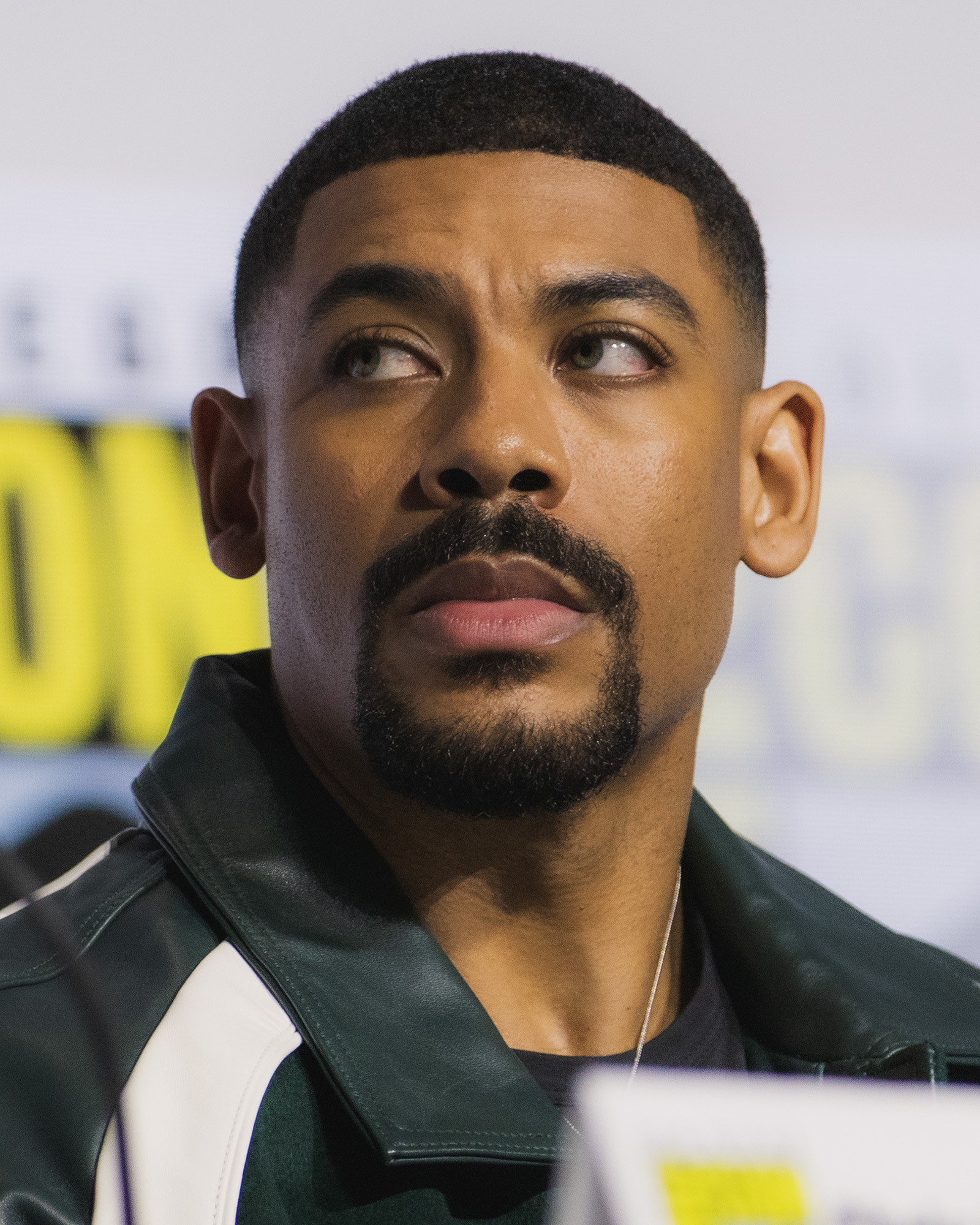
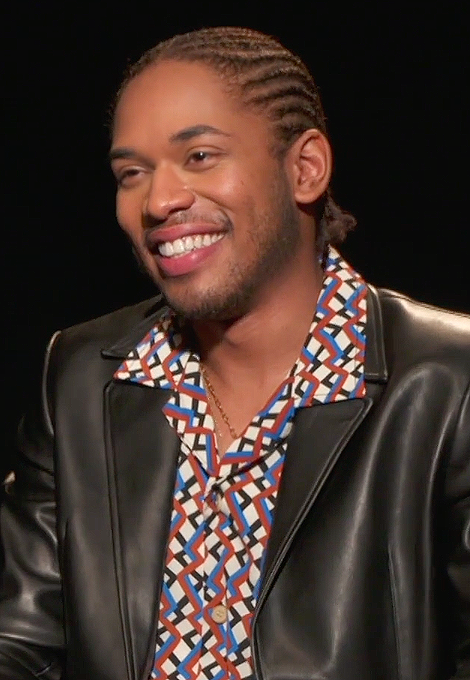
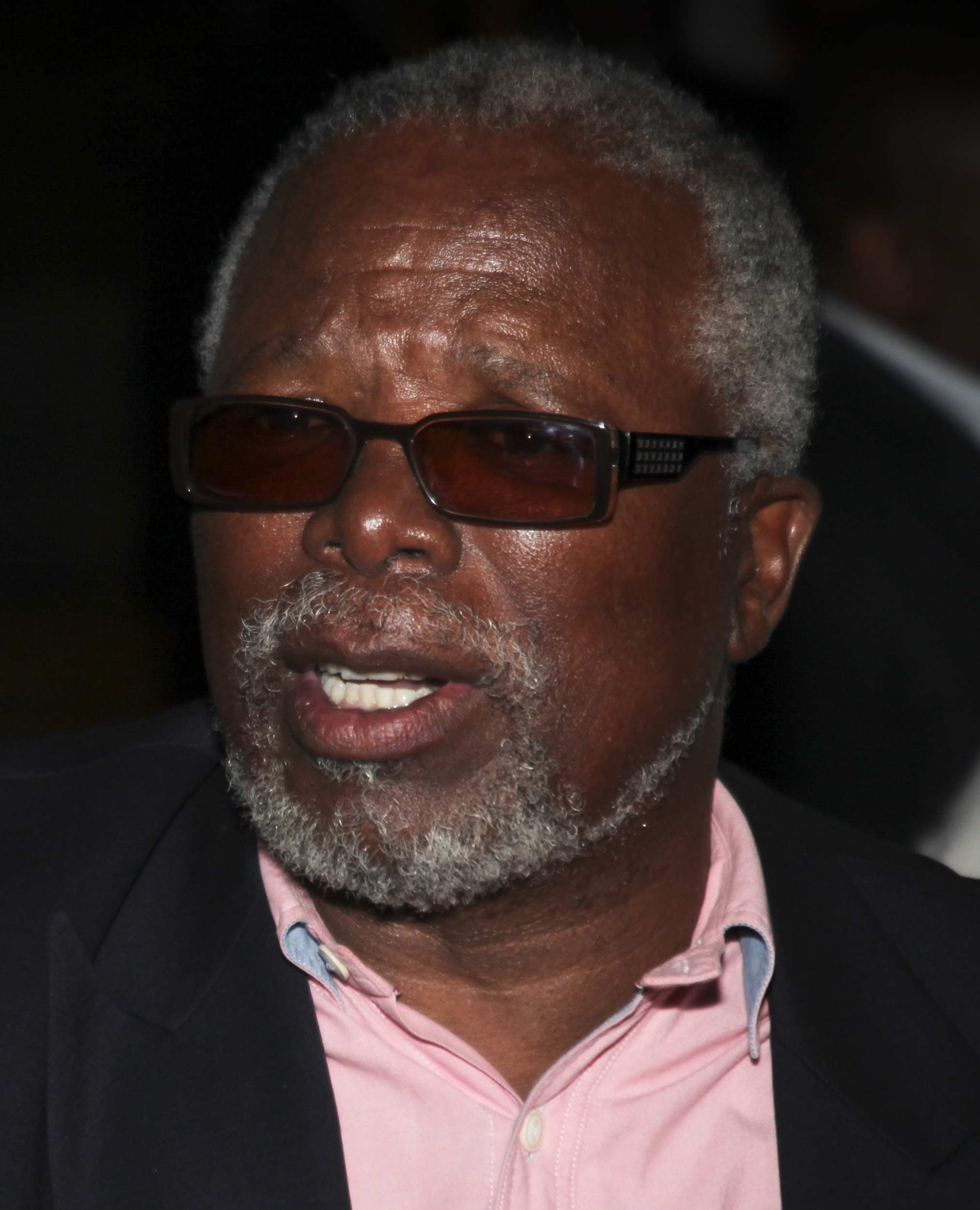
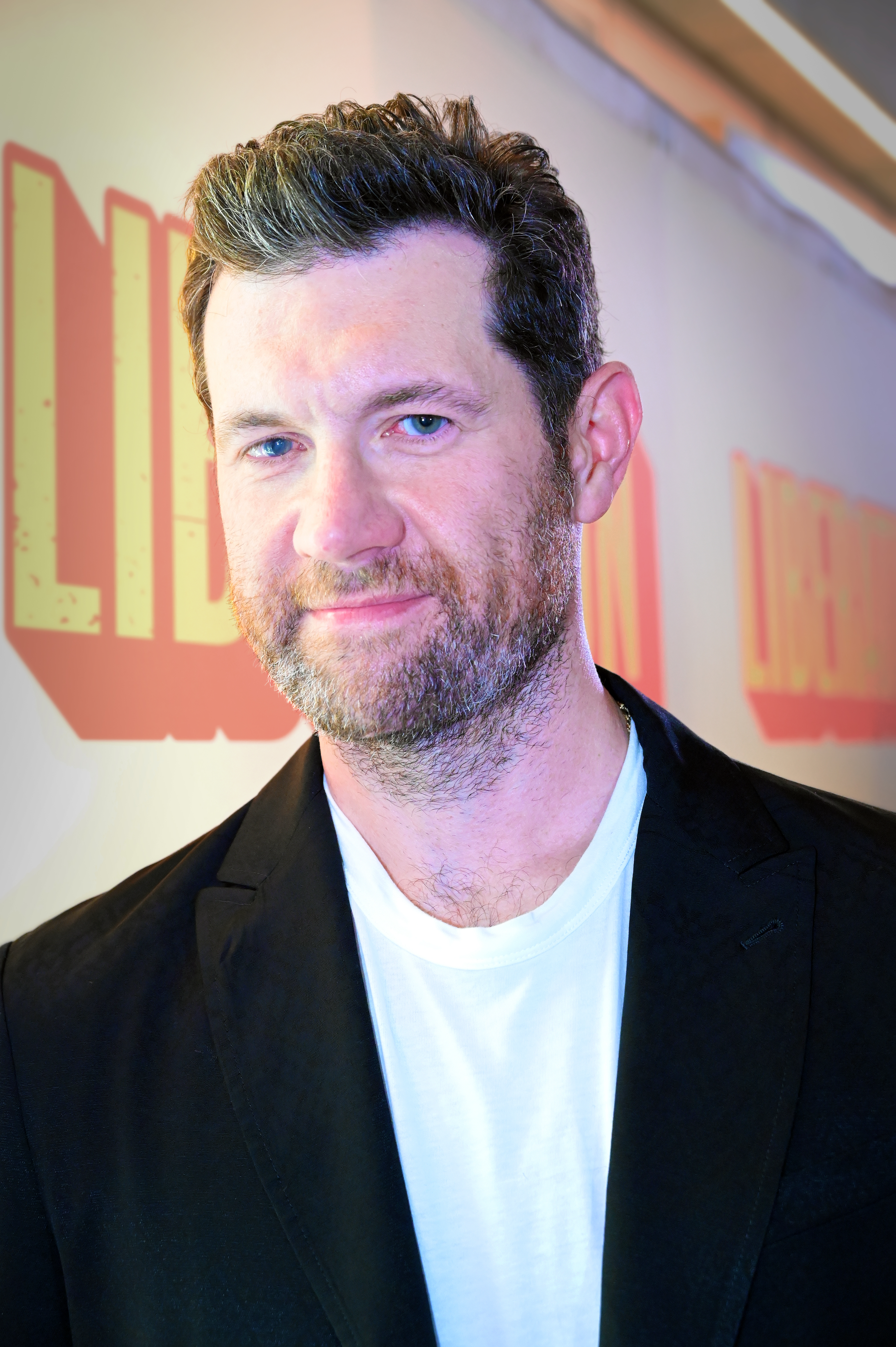
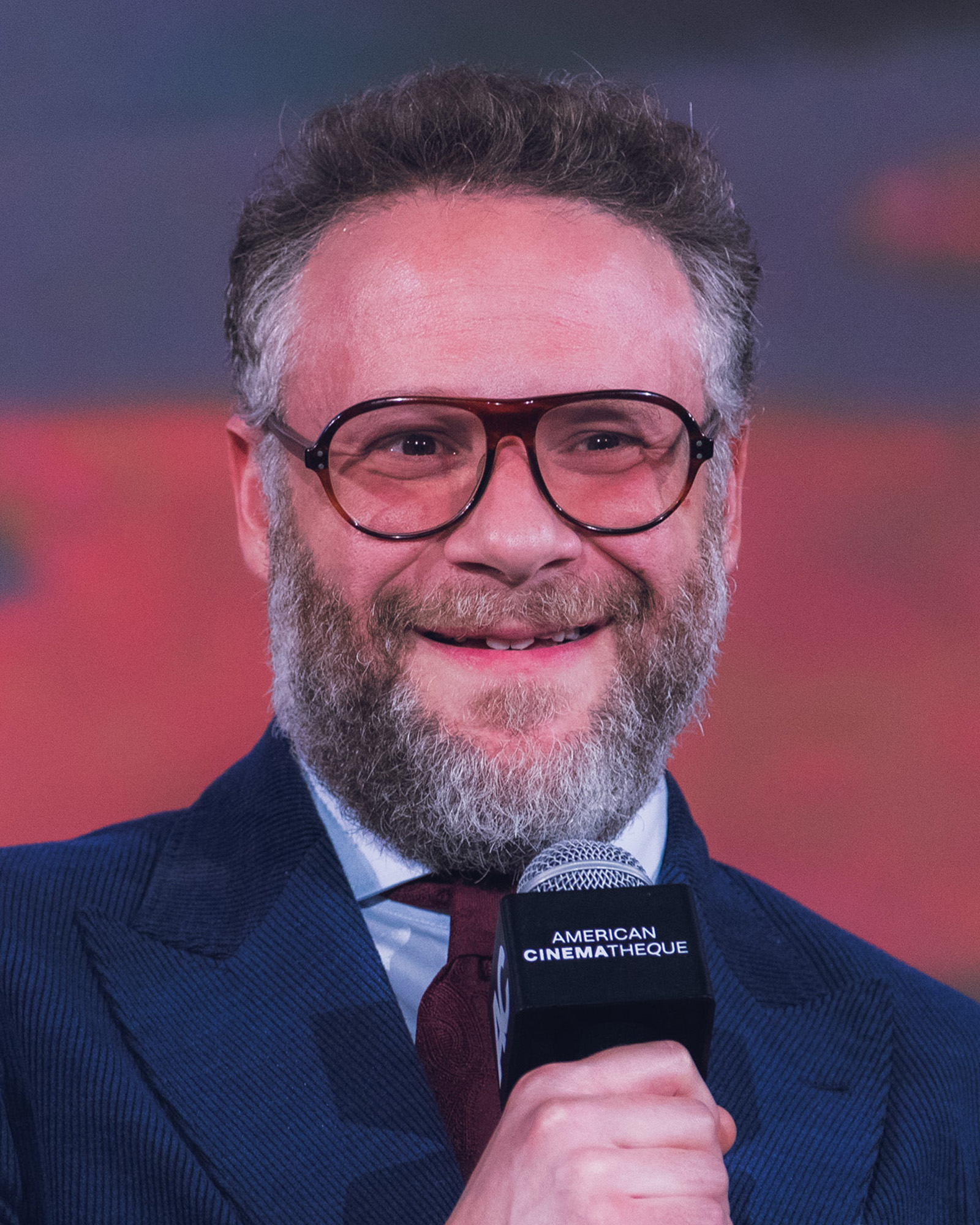
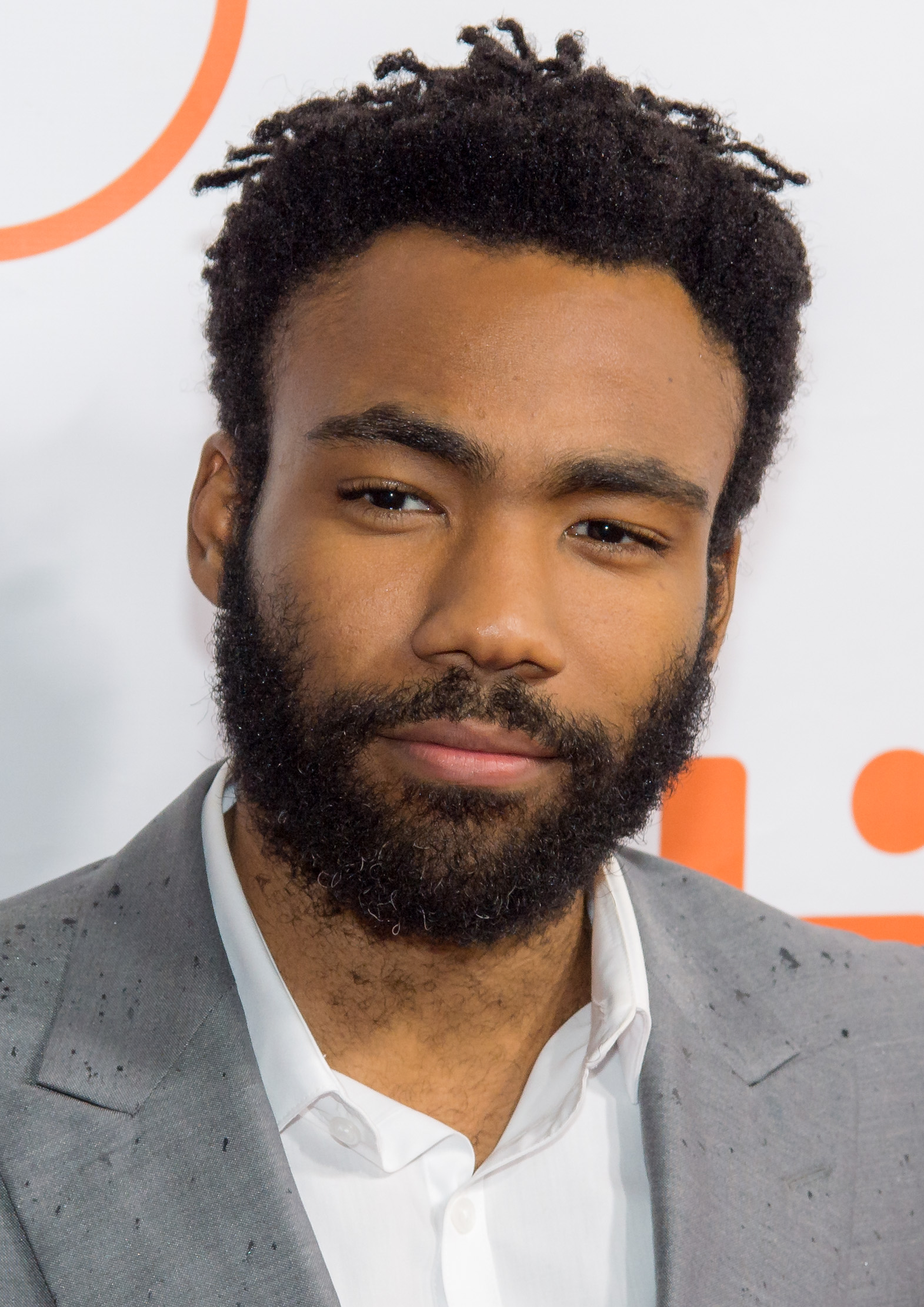
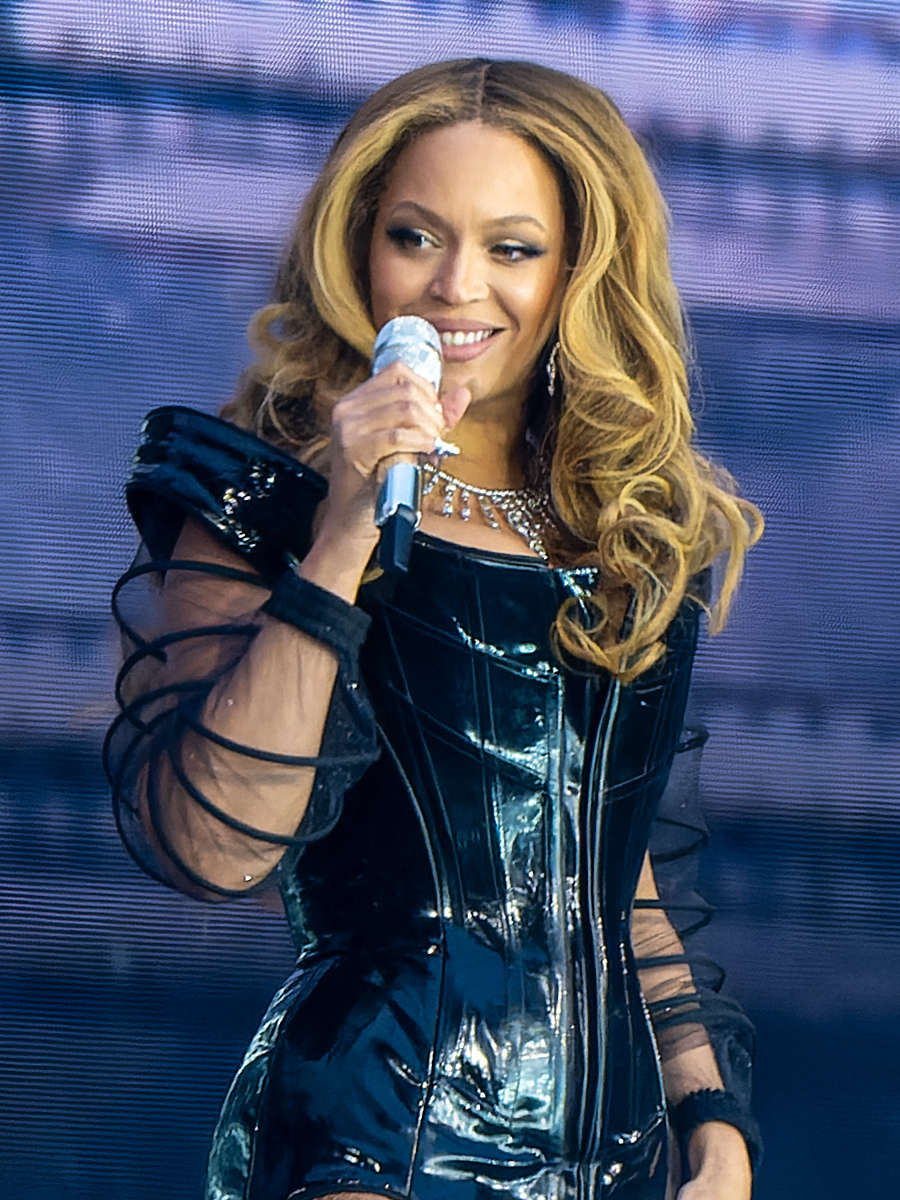
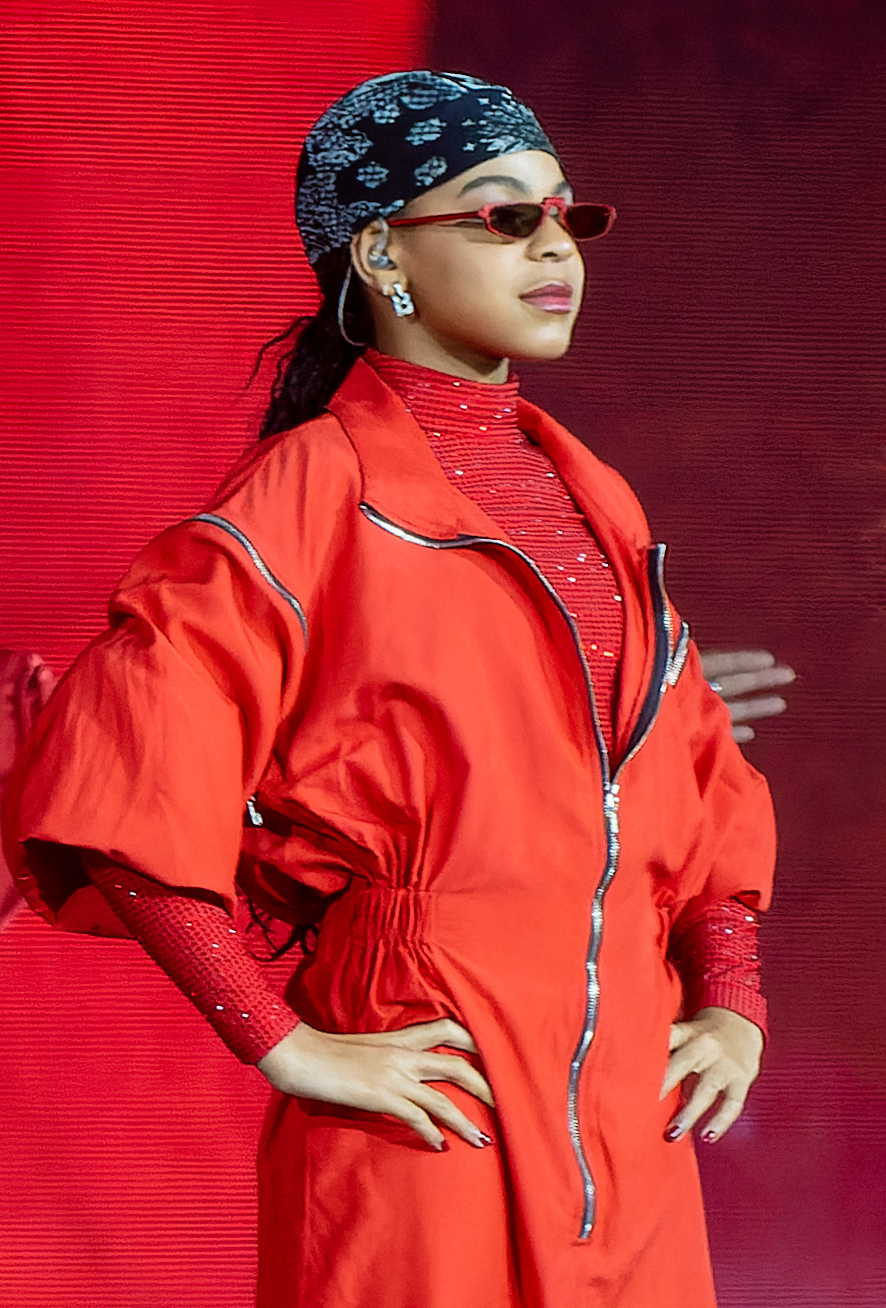
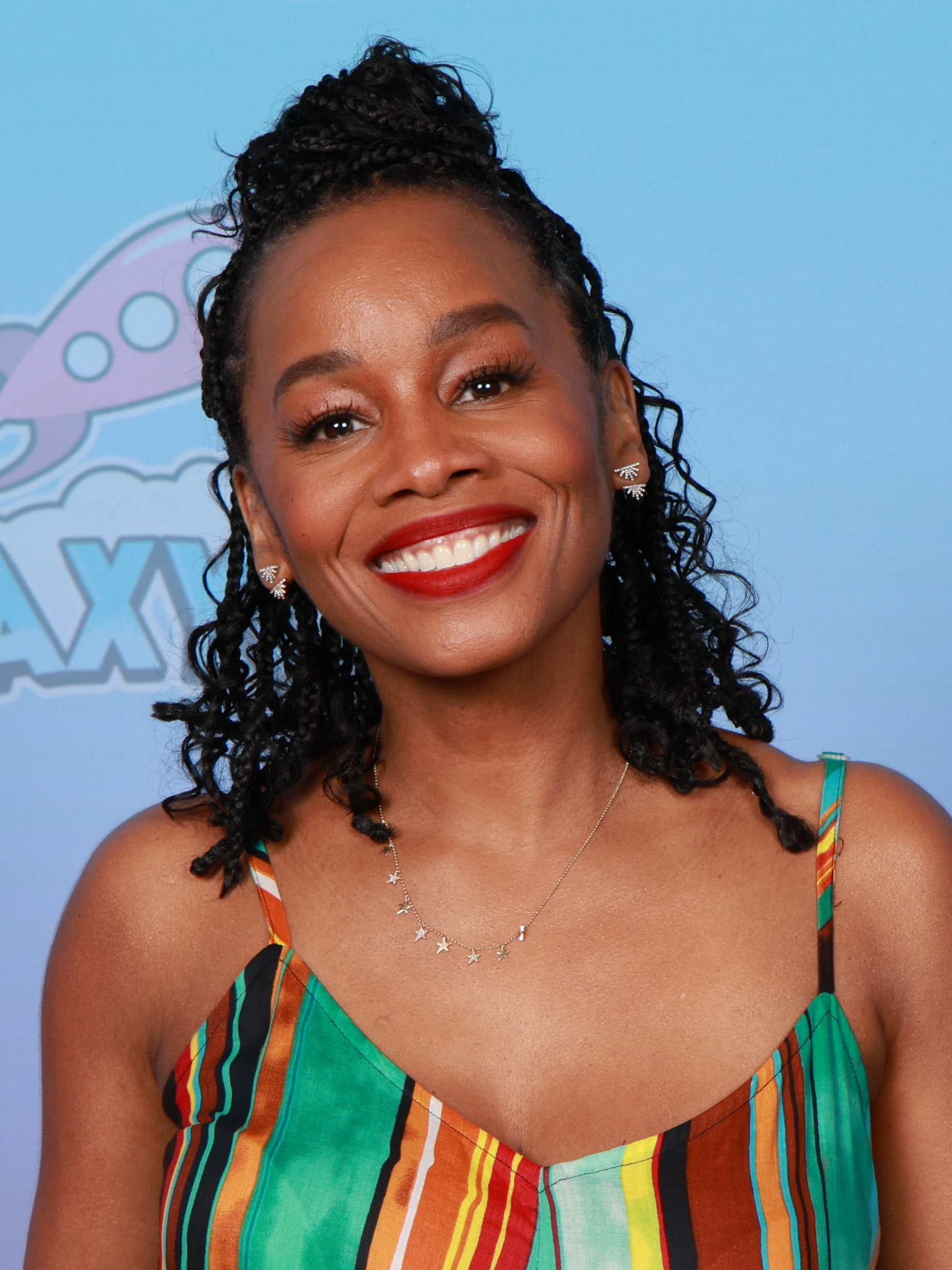
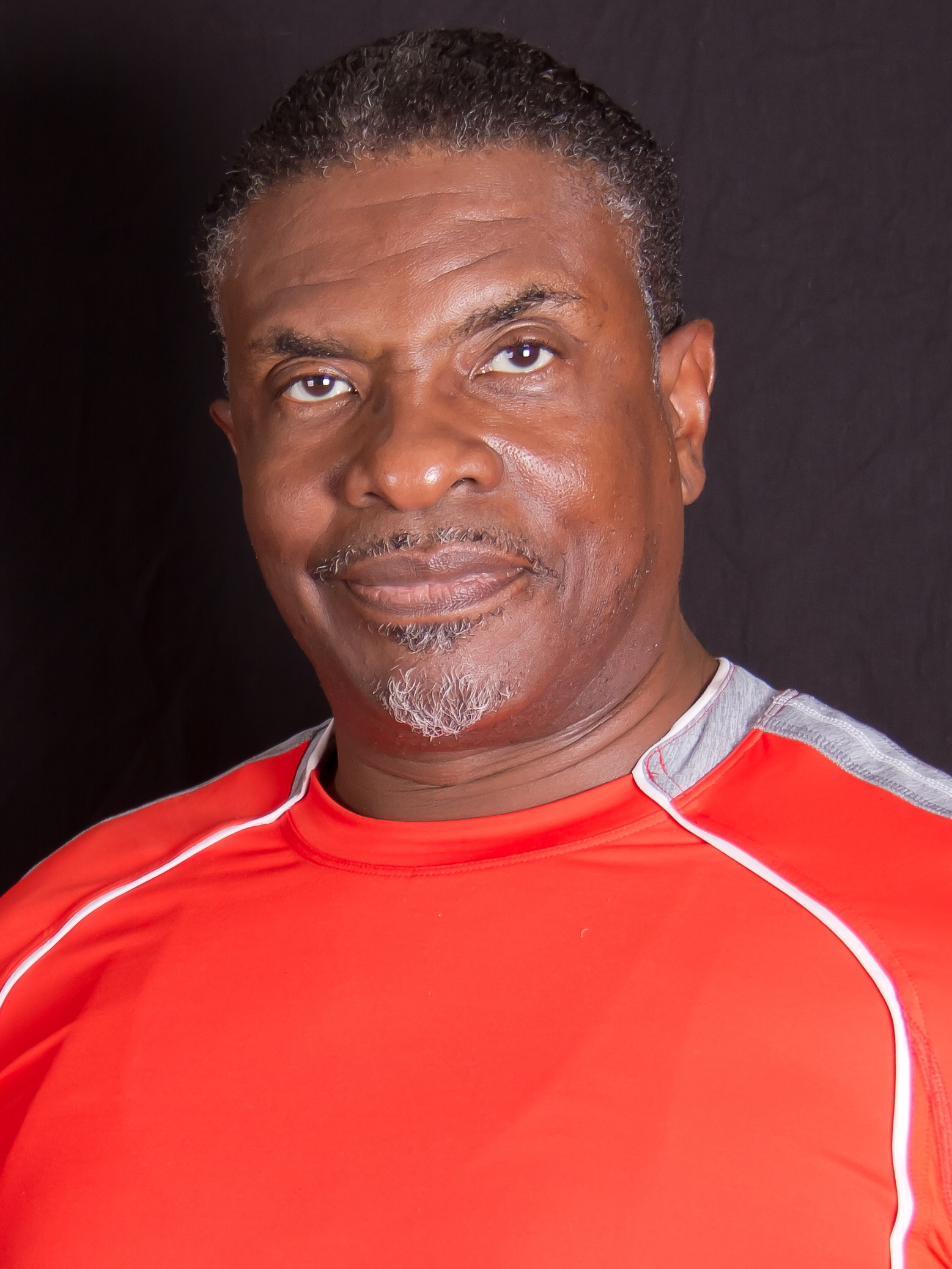
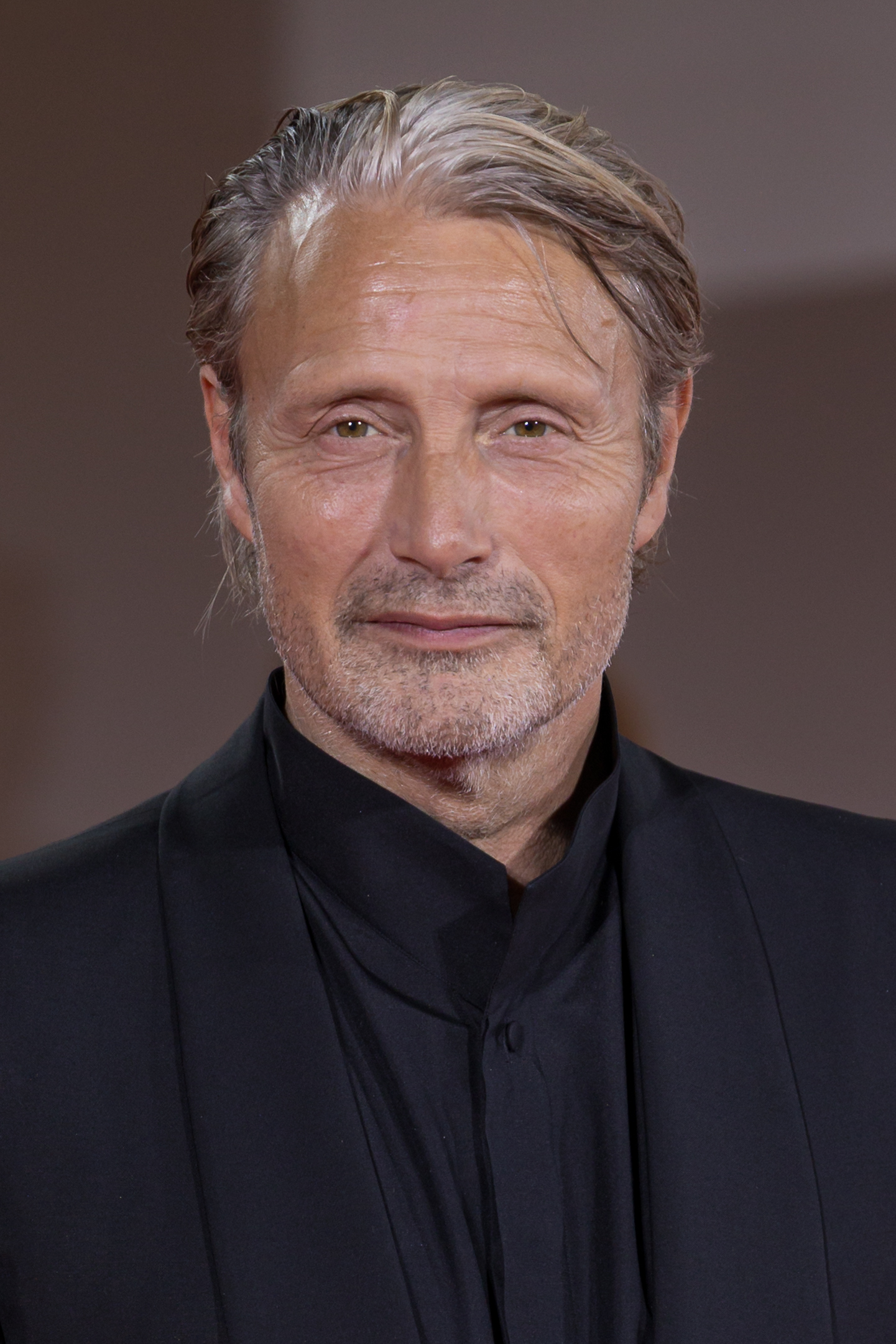
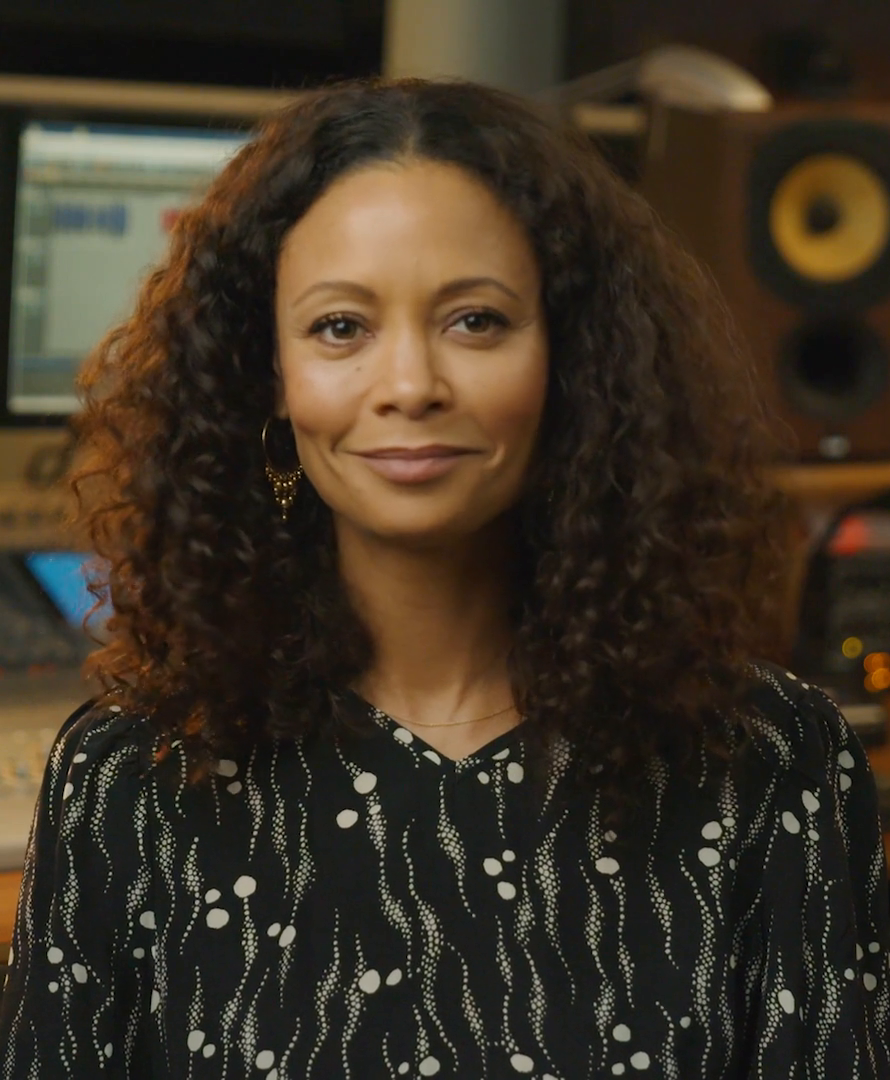
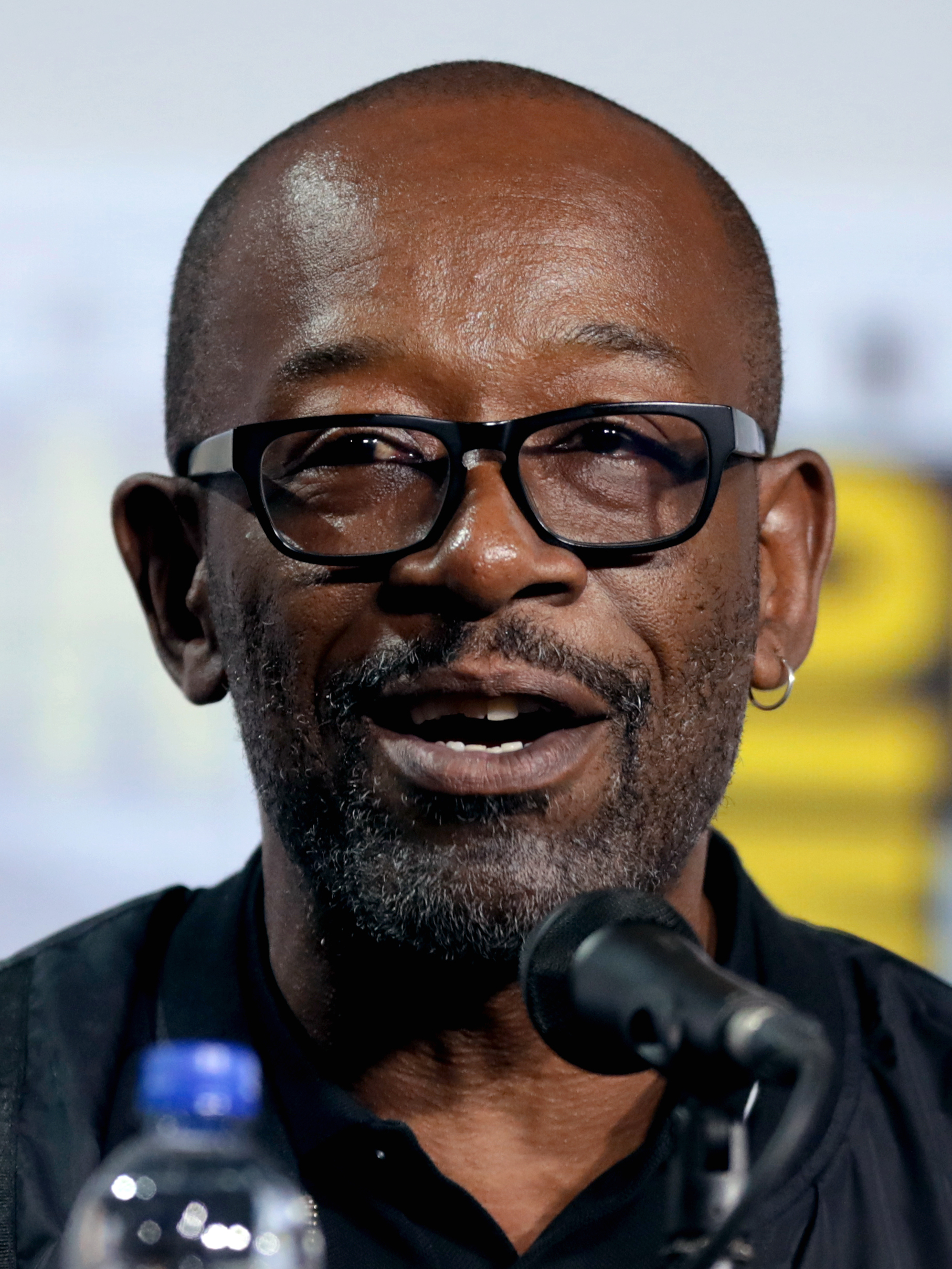
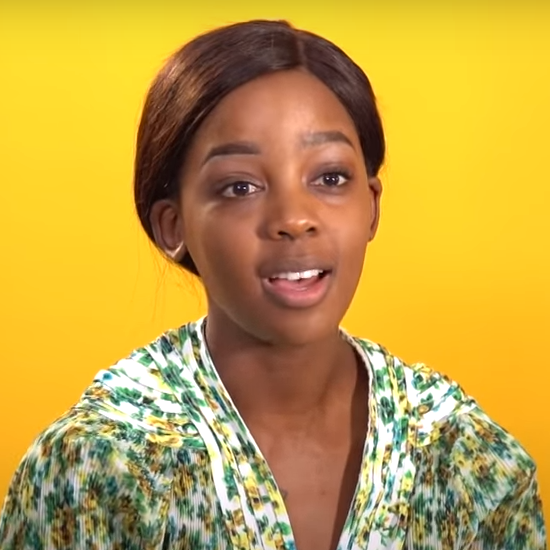
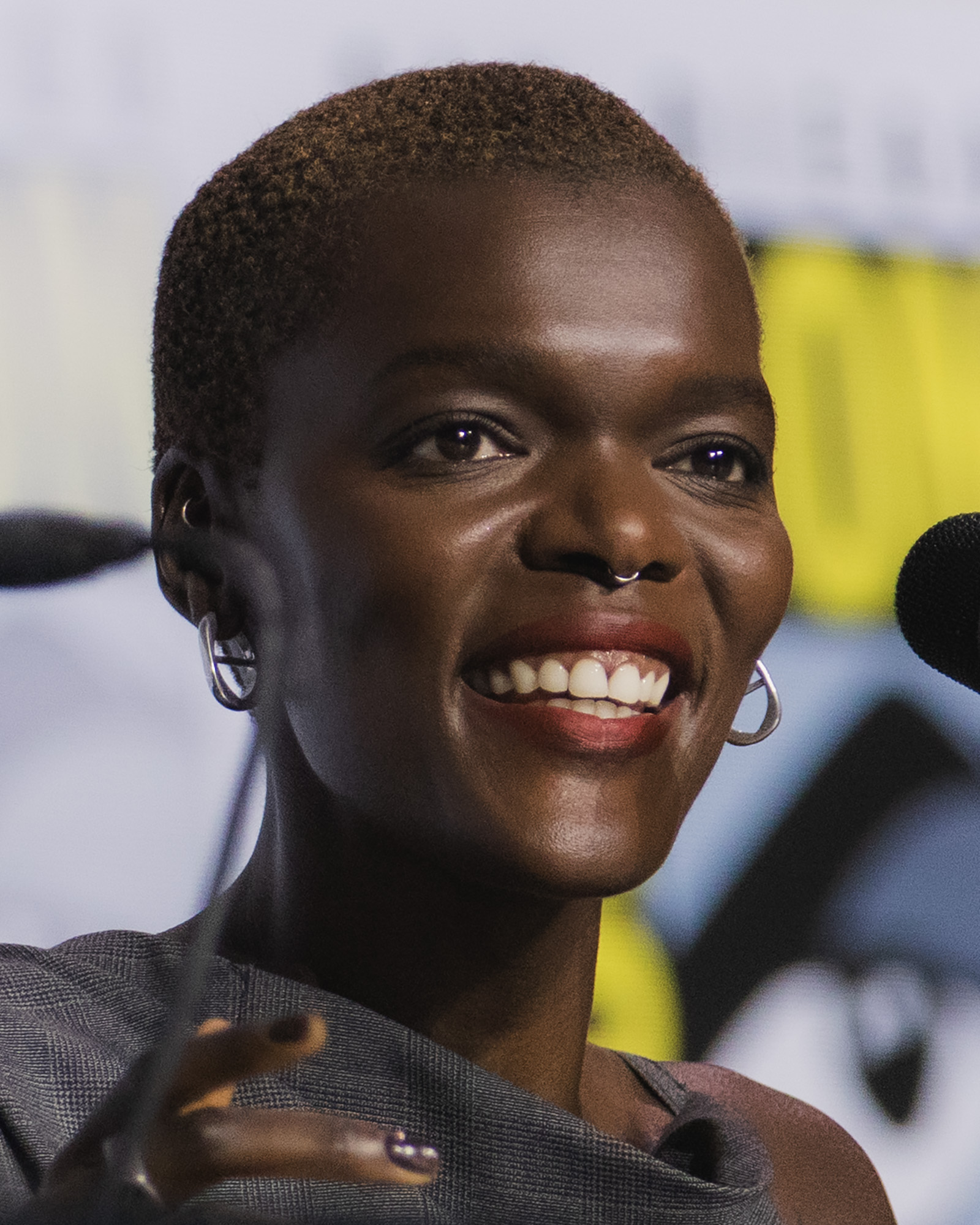
Aaron Pierre (in 2026), Kelvin Harrison Jr. (in 2021), John Kani (in 2015), Billy Eichner (in 2025), Seth Rogen (in 2025), Donald Glover (in 2015), Beyoncé Knowles-Carter (in 2023), Blue Ivy Carter (in 2023), Anika Noni Rose (in 2024), Keith David (in 2012), Mads Mikkelsen (in 2025), Thandiwe Newton (in 2021), Lennie James (in 2019), Folake Olowofoyeku (in 2023), Thuso Mbedu (in 2019) and Sheila Atim (in 2026).
- Aaron Pierre as Mufasa, an orphaned lion who grows up to become the future king of the Pride Lands, the father of Simba and the grandfather of Kiara.
  - Braelyn and Brielle Rankins voice Mufasa as a cub.
  - Archived recordings of James Earl Jones as adult Mufasa are used during the opening of the film. Jones died three months before the film's release; it was dedicated to his memory.
- Kelvin Harrison Jr. as Taka, a young lion prince, the adoptive brother of Mufasa, and the son of Eshe and Obasi. He later becomes known as Scar, as well as the uncle of Simba.
  - Theo Somolu voices Taka as a cub.
- John Kani as Rafiki, a wise mandrill who serves as the shaman of the Pride Lands, and a close friend of Mufasa's, telling his story to Kiara, Timon, and Pumbaa.
  - Kagiso Lediga as young adult Rafiki.
- Seth Rogen as Pumbaa, a good-humored warthog who befriended Simba when he was a cub and provides color commentary to Rafiki's story.
- Billy Eichner as Timon, a wise-cracking meerkat who befriended Simba when he was a cub and provides color commentary to Rafiki's story.
- Tiffany Boone as Sarabi, a lioness who befriends Mufasa, Taka, Rafiki, and Zazu, and grows up to become the queen of the Pride Lands, the mother of Simba and the grandmother of Kiara.
- Donald Glover as Simba, the current king of the Pride Lands and Mufasa and Sarabi's son.
- Mads Mikkelsen as Kiros, the formidable leader of a pride of white lions known as the Outsiders, who seeks revenge on Mufasa for killing his son Shaju.
- Thandiwe Newton as Eshe, Taka's mother, Mufasa's adoptive mother, and Obasi's mate.
- Lennie James as Obasi, Taka's father, Mufasa's adoptive father, Eshe's mate, and the leader of his pride in the Valley of the Kings who disapproves of Mufasa at first due to prejudice of outsiders.
- Anika Noni Rose as Afia, Mufasa's biological mother.
- Blue Ivy Carter as Kiara, Simba and Nala's daughter, Mufasa and Sarabi's granddaughter and the cub princess of the Pride Lands.
- Beyoncé Knowles-Carter as Nala, Simba's mate, the queen of the Pride Lands, and Mufasa and Sarabi's daughter-in-law.
- Preston Nyman as Zazu, a hornbill, Sarabi's scout and the future majordomo to the King of the Pride Lands.
- Keith David as Masego, Mufasa's biological father.
- Joanna Jones as Akua, one of Kiros' sisters.
- Folake Olowofoyeku as Amara, one of Kiros' sisters.
- Thuso Mbedu as Junia, a yellow baboon, a friend of Rafiki, and a member of Rafiki's former troop.
- Sheila Atim as Ajarry, a giraffe, who is the leader of her herd who lived in Milele.
- Abdul Salis as Chigaru, a member of Obasi's pride who scouts out the Outsiders' location.
- Derrick L. McMillon as Mosi, a elderly yellow baboon and the member of Rafiki's former troop.
- Maestro Harrell as Inaki, another elderly yellow baboon and a member of Rafiki's former troop.
- A.J. Beckles as Azibo, a white lion and member of the Outsiders who is eaten by lionesses for failing to save Kiros's son Shaju due to his injury.
- Dominique Jennings as Sarafina, a friend of Sarabi who grows up to be Nala's mother.
- David S. Lee as Mobo, the Cape buffalo, who helped by Mufasa stands the Outsiders in Milele.
- Gary A. Hecker as lion vocal effects

In addition, Sylvia Tirix as Zala, another elderly yellow baboon and a member of Rafiki's former troop.

== Production ==
=== Development ===
In September 2020, it was announced that a follow-up film to the live-action-styled CGI photorealistic 2019 remake of The Lion King (1994) was in development, directed by Barry Jenkins. It is his fourth feature directorial role and first in blockbuster filmmaking. Reports indicated a story centered on Mufasa during his formative years, with additional scenes focusing on the events after the first film, comparing the structure to that of The Godfather Part II (1974). By this point, Jeff Nathanson, the previous installment's screenwriter, had completed a draft of the script. The film was officially announced, with the title of Mufasa: The Lion King at the 2022 D23 Expo.

On December 13, 2023, the Hollywood Handle reported that the plot would involve Rafiki telling the story of Mufasa to his granddaughter, Kiara, marking the character's first on-screen appearance in an animated feature film since The Lion King II: Simba's Pride (1998), the direct-to-video sequel to the original animated film. Regarding any adaptation from Simba's Pride, Jenkins stated that "some stuff" from the canon was very much alluded and referenced, but it would not an adaptation.

=== Casting ===
In August 2021, Aaron Pierre and Kelvin Harrison Jr. were cast as the voices of young Mufasa and Scar, respectively. During an interview with Fandango in April 2023 about his film Chevalier (2022), Harrison confirmed that the film would explore Scar's backstory, portraying him in a "hilarious and very, very spicy" way and expressing interest in how the young and sweet Scar's relationship with his brother Mufasa evolves throughout the film. Speaking with ComicBook.com in August 2024, Pierre described how his role as Terry Richmond and his work with Jeremy Saulnier in Rebel Ridge (2024) offered him, like most of his projects, the opportunity to internalize lessons from the work and characters so as to move forward with his role as Mufasa, saying that previous life experiences inform his future ones. By September 2022, it was revealed that Seth Rogen, Billy Eichner, and John Kani would reprise their roles as Pumbaa, Timon, and Rafiki, respectively.

In April 2024, Beyoncé Knowles-Carter and Donald Glover were confirmed to reprise their roles, with Blue Ivy Carter (in her feature film debut), Tiffany Boone, Kagiso Lediga, Preston Nyman, Mads Mikkelsen, Thandiwe Newton, Lennie James, Anika Noni Rose, Keith David, Braelyn Rankins, Theo Somolu, Folake Olowofoyeku, Joanna Jones, Thuso Mbedu, Sheila Atim, Abdul Salis, and Dominique Jennings announced as new additions to the cast. Jenkins considered casting Blue Ivy as Kiara since he heard the audiobook version she did for his friend Matthew A. Cherry's Hair Love (2019) short film, but had reservations on whether she and her mother would want to act opposite each other, fearing it may hit "too close to home". However, both Blue Ivy and Beyoncé were enthusiastic when he proposed the idea to them. Coupled with Beyoncé's Renaissance World Tour, during which Blue Ivy danced to one of The Lion King: The Gift (2019) album's songs, Jenkins said there was synergy between mother and daughter with the film showcasing a type of "time capsule".

=== Visual effects ===
In September 2022, at the D23 Expo in Anaheim, California, early footage was shown exclusively to attendees for the first time, thus revealing that production was already underway. Moving Picture Company returned to provide the visual effects. In July 2023, production on the film slowed down due to the 2023 SAG-AFTRA strike.

== Music ==
By June 2022, Nicholas Britell was set to compose the score for the film, having previously collaborated with Jenkins on various projects. He was joined by Hans Zimmer and Pharrell Williams in September, returning from the 2019 film. In April 2024, it was announced that Lin-Manuel Miranda would write the songs for the film; Jenkins approached Miranda to work on the film due to keeping in touch since Jenkins almost cast Miranda in his film If Beale Street Could Talk (2018). He started work on it in secret at the beginning of 2022. Mark Mancina was to co-produce the songs with Miranda, with Lebo M providing additional vocals and performances. In September 2024, Dave Metzger was announced to be composing the film's score, with Zimmer, Britell, and Williams said to have dropped out prior to production. While Metzger received sole credit for the score, Zimmer's themes from the previous films were reused in Metzger's score, such as "Under the Stars" and "King of Pride Rock". Zimmer is additionally credited for the track "And So It's Time". Additionally, four of Britell's themes for the film were included, all of which he composed with Lebo M.

== Marketing ==
During the 2022 D23 Expo, an exclusive preview for the film was shown to those who attended, which revealed that Mufasa was an orphaned cub. The preview also revealed that Rafiki and Timon would tell stories about Mufasa's past and his way to becoming king. Barry Jenkins also appeared when Walt Disney Studios presented its 2024 theatrical slate at CinemaCon on April 11, 2024, to promote the film, where he remarked: "You are probably wondering... what is the director of Moonlight doing talking to me about an eight-quadrant tentpole legacy IP massive film? [...] And I gotta say, the thought was very strange to me at first, as well. But oh my god. It was one of the best decisions I've ever made in my life, and I'm so glad I made this picture."

The first teaser trailer and the official teaser poster, featuring young Mufasa with his adult counterpart reflected in a puddle in front of him, debuted on April 29, 2024, on ABC's Good Morning America. The trailer's music track was bookended by a new instrumental rendition of "Circle of Life", confirming that some musical material by Elton John and Tim Rice from the previous film would be featured in the film in some way. The trailer received a mixed reception, with some deeming the film as "unnecessary" and a "soulless prequel to a soulless remake". Jenkins responded on Twitter writing, "There is nothing soulless about The Lion King ... For decades children have sat in theaters all over the world experiencing collective grief for the first time, engaging Shakespeare for the first time, across aisles in myriad languages. A most potent vessel for communal empathy."

The official full trailer for the film premiered during the Disney Entertainment Showcase at the 2024 D23 Expo on August 10, 2024, alongside a variant on the first poster with Taka and his future adult counterpart of Scar reflected in the puddle. The presentation also premiered "I Always Wanted a Brother", one of the songs Miranda wrote for the film. Miranda appeared in person at D23 for the first time with Jenkins to personally present the trailer.

The final trailer was unveiled at D23 Brazil on November 8, 2024, alongside a new poster featuring Mufasa, Taka, Rafiki, Zazu, Timon, Pumba, and Kiara. Earlier that day, Tiffany Boone and Kelvin Harrison Jr. appeared on Good Morning America to discuss the film and share a sneak-peek of the trailer.

== Release ==
Mufasa: The Lion King's world premiere took place at the Dolby Theatre in Los Angeles on December 9, 2024, and was released in the United States on December 20, 2024. It was previously scheduled for release on July 5, 2024, but was delayed to its current date due to the 2023 SAG-AFTRA strike taking over the original release date of Marvel Studios' Thunderbolts*.

=== Home media ===
Mufasa: The Lion King was released for digital download on February 18, 2025, was released on Disney+ on March 26, 2025, and was released on 4K Ultra HD, Blu-ray and DVD on April 1.

The film debuted at No. 3 on the UK's Official Film Chart for the week ending February 26. Mufasa: The Lion King later moved one spot to No. 4 on the UK's Official Film Chart for the week ending March 5. The movie climbed from No. 4 to No. 2 on Fandango at Home's digital sales chart for the week ending March 16. The film debuted at No. 1 on both the overall disc sales chart and the Blu-ray Disc sales chart for the week ending April 5, according to data from Circana VideoScan. HD formats accounted for 46% of its total unit sales, with 37% coming from standard Blu-ray and 9% from a 4K Steelbook combo pack. For the week ending April 12, Mufasa: The Lion King continued to top both the overall disc sales chart and the Blu-ray Disc sales chart.

Analytics company Samba TV, which gathers viewership data from certain smart TVs and content providers, reported that Mufasa: The Lion King debuted with 880,000 U.S. households streaming the film within its first five days on Disney+. Hispanic households over-indexed by 25% in viewership. By comparison, the film's Premium Video on Demand (PVOD) release on February 18, across digital retail platforms was rented by 217,000 U.S. households in its first five days. Nielsen Media Research, which records streaming viewership on certain U.S. television screens, calculated that Mufasa: The Lion King accumulated a total of 2.730 billion minutes streamed between January and June 2025, ranking as the fifteenth most-streamed film in that period.

== Reception ==
=== Box office ===
Mufasa: The Lion King grossed $255 million in the United States and Canada, and $468 million in other territories, for a worldwide gross of $723 million. Deadline Hollywood calculated the film's net profit as $175 million, accounting for production budgets, marketing, and other costs; box office grosses, merchandise, television and streaming, and home media revenues placing it ninth on their list of 2024's "Most Valuable Blockbusters".

In the United States and Canada, Mufasa: The Lion King was released alongside Sonic the Hedgehog 3 and was originally projected to gross around $50 million from 4,100 theaters in its opening weekend. After making $13.3 million on its first day (including $3.3 million from Thursday night previews), weekend estimates were lowered to $36–38 million. It went on to debut to $35.4 million, finishing second behind Sonic the Hedgehog 3. In its second weekend, the film retained second place, grossing $36.8 million. In its third weekend, it replaced Sonic the Hedgehog 3 at first position at the domestic box office, crossing the $150 million mark. In its fifth weekend, the film outperformed newcomers Wolf Man and One of Them Days to finish first at the box office over the four-day MLK weekend. The New York Times attributed the movie's long-term box office success to less competition from other theater releases and the social media popularity of the movie's songs.

In the United Kingdom and Ireland, the film made £4.4 million (US$6 million) in its opening weekend. In India, the film has made more than ₹130 crore (equivalent to ₹138 crore or US$15 million in 2026) within 2 weeks of its release.

=== Critical response ===
On Review aggregator Rotten Tomatoes it has an approval rating of 56% based on 222 reviews, with an average rating of 5.8/10. The website's critical consensus reads: "Barry Jenkins' deft hand and Lin-Manuel Miranda's music go some way towards squaring the Circle of Life in Mufasa, but this fitfully soulful story is ill-served by its impersonal, photorealistic animation style." Metacritic, which uses a weighted average, assigned the film a score of 56 out of 100, based on 51 critics, indicating "mixed or average" reviews. Audiences polled by CinemaScore gave the film an average grade of "A–" on an A+ to F scale, while those polled by PostTrak gave it an 85% positive score.

Several publications said the film's animation was an improvement over the 2019 remake. Matt Zoller Seitz of RogerEbert.com gave the film 3 1/2 stars out of four, writing it is a "technological step up" from the remake, in which it finds "new ways to make the creatures expressive and emotionally available to us while also somehow convincing us that they are indeed animals, whose every talon, whisker, and hair seems as real as imagery in a nature documentary." Maureen Lee Lenker for Entertainment Weekly wrote the animation was "more compelling than the stagnant energy of Favreau's The Lion King, but at times, it feels almost frenzied, as if Jenkins is desperate to prove he can do something interesting with the material." In a five-star review, The Times's Kevin Maher praised the film's ending as "a special effects extravaganza that's thankfully free from the incoherence that dogged Jon Favreau's Lion King remake in 2019. Jenkins instead keeps everything focused on the drama, the pain of broken fraternal bonds, and families destroyed and rebuilt." However, Bilge Ebiri of Vulture said Mufasa: The Lion King "looks impressive on a technical level, but it makes even less of an impression than its 2019 predecessor. Yes, it will surely make truckloads of money. Artistically speaking, it feels like an enormous wasted opportunity, especially given the talent involved." in The A.V. Club, Ignatiy Vishnevetsky called the film an improvement over the 2019 remake, though noted that "making Mufasa and Scar something other than blood relations is a retcon, though it at least explains why they have different accents."

The film's screenplay received mixed reviews. Peter Debruge of Variety criticized Timon and Pumbaa's comedic interruptions, writing they make "strangely self-aware cracks about corporate lawyers, script notes and a certain hit song they assume everyone's sick of by now"; overall, he said the narrative approach was "like a mistake, serving mostly to delay and interrupt the main attraction, which is Mufasa's origin story". Entertainment Weekly called Jeff Nathanson's script "lackluster" and said the film tried too hard to "over-explain Simba's world. Not everything needs a backstory, a lesson that Disney could use right about now." Lovia Gyarke of The Hollywood Reporter said the film's pacing "becomes choppier and less coherent. Part of that can be attributed to an overstuffed narrative. Nathanson plumps the story with platitudes and moments that could lead to, well, more franchising."

Lin-Manuel Miranda's songs received mixed reviews. (Note: Attributed to multiple references:) David Fear of Rolling Stone wrote there's "nothing near as earworm-level as 'Hakuna Matata' or majestically overwhelming" as Elton John's original songs, but that Miranda's compositions served "more like he's bending over backwards to complement those earlier karaoke staples". Amy Nicholson of the Los Angeles Times wrote "it's hard to call any one song a showstopper. They aren't built for bombast, and none are as in-the-moment earwormy as 'Hakuna Matata'..." Lenker said the songs were "a lackluster outing from the songsmith, with no memorable tracks to speak of". James Berardinelli of ReelViews critiqued the "songs are uniformly forgettable, although that could in part be because the numbers in The Lion King are so memorable. Perhaps Lin-Manuel Miranda was tasked with a thankless job." The Times praised the songs, writing Miranda delivered what is "easily his finest film work since the first Moana".

Filmmaker Robert Eggers counted Mufasa among his favorite films of 2024, saying "It was truly moving to see what Barry Jenkins' singular voice brought to this massive event film."

=== Accolades ===
Award	Date of ceremony	Category	Recipient(s)	Result	Ref.
Artios Awards	February 12, 2025	Outstanding Achievement in Casting - Feature Animation	Francine Maisler and Molly Rose	Nominated	
Black Reel Awards	February 17, 2025	Outstanding Voice Performance	Aaron Pierre	Nominated	
Black Reel Awards	February 17, 2025	Outstanding Soundtrack	Mufasa: The Lion King (Original Motion Picture Soundtrack)	Nominated	
Golden Reel Awards	February 23, 2025	Outstanding Achievement in Sound Editing – Feature Animation	Onnalee Blank, Harry Cohen, Paula Fairfield, Luke Gibleon, Jason W. Jennings, Benjamin L. Cook, Katie Halliday, Ando Johnson, Michael Mitchell, Jessie Pariseau, Roland N. Thai, Vanessa Lapato, Katy Wood, Pietu Korhonen, John Cucci, Gary Hecker, Mike Horton, Heikki Kossi and Dan O'Connell	Nominated	
Golden Raspberry Awards	March 1, 2025	Worst Remake, Rip-off, or Sequel	Barry Jenkins, Adele Romanski, and Mark Ceryak	Nominated	
NAACP Image Awards	February 22, 2025	Outstanding Character Voice Performance – Motion Picture	Aaron Pierre	Nominated	
NAACP Image Awards	February 22, 2025	Outstanding Character Voice Performance – Motion Picture	Anika Noni Rose	Nominated	
NAACP Image Awards	February 22, 2025	Outstanding Character Voice Performance – Motion Picture	Blue Ivy Carter	Won	
Nickelodeon Kids' Choice Awards	June 21, 2025	Favorite Animated Movie	Mufasa: The Lion King	Nominated	
Nickelodeon Kids' Choice Awards	June 21, 2025	Favorite Song from a Movie	"I Always Wanted a Brother" – Braelyn Rankins, Theo Somolu, Aaron Pierre, and Kelvin Harrison Jr.	Nominated	
Satellite Awards	January 26, 2025	Best Visual Effects	Audrey Ferrara and Adam Valdez	Nominated	
Visual Effects Society Awards	February 11, 2025	Outstanding Visual Effects in a Photoreal Feature	Adam Valdez, Barry St. John, Audrey Ferrara, Daniel Fotheringham	Nominated	
Visual Effects Society Awards	February 11, 2025	Outstanding Character in a Photoreal Feature	Klaus Skovbo, Valentina Rosselli, Eli De Koninck, Amelie Talarmain (for Taka)	Nominated	
Visual Effects Society Awards	February 11, 2025	Emerging Technology Award	Callum James, James Hood, Lloyd Bishop, Bruno Pedrinha (for "Real-Time Interactive Filmmaking, From Stage to Post")	Nominated	

The film was shortlisted in two categories at the 97th Academy Awards: Best Visual Effects and Best Original Song for the song "Tell Me It's You". But in both, the film was ultimately not nominated.
