= Babatunji Olowofoyeku =

Nigerian politician, educationist, lawyer and leader

- Babátúnjí Olówòfóyèkù

Attorney General of the Western Region
- In office 26 September 1963 – 15 January 1966
- Premier: Ladoke Akintola

Personal details
- Born: 21 May 1917 Ilesha, Colony and Protectorate of Nigeria
- Died: 26 March 2003 (aged 85) Lagos, Nigeria
- Party: NCNC, NNDP
- Children: 17, including Tokunbo and Folake
- Profession: Lawyer, politician

Babatunji Olowofoyeku OFR SAN (Yoruba: Babátúnjí Olówòfóyèkù, pronounced [bābátṹd͡ʒí ōlówòfójèkù]; 21 May 1917 – 26 March 2003) was a Nigerian politician, educationist, lawyer and public servant, a Yoruba and native of Ilesha in Osun State of Nigeria, whose political career started in the mid-1950s.

== Early life and education ==
Olowofoyeku was born in May 1917, and he grew up as the last born of a traditional extended family in Ilesha, a town in the west-south-west of what had previously been Western Nigeria, a protectorate within the British Empire. Ilesha had previously been right on the border with Southern Nigeria, and was near the border with French-ruled Dahomey. In 1914, both British protectorates, together with the Colony of Lagos, were amalgamated as the Colony and Protectorate of Nigeria. Olowofoyeku was born about three years after this new colonial entity had been created by the British. His father died a few months before he was born. His mother enrolled him at the age of 5 at Otapete Methodist School and he was baptised there in the Methodist Church in 1924 and assumed the Christian name "Daniel".

In school at Otapete Methodist, Olowofoyeku met classmate, Tai Solarin, then known as Augustus Solarin who became a lifelong friend. They both attended St. Andrew's College, Oyo, from 1936 until 1942. Solarin later said that he was radically changed by Olowofoyeku's final essay in which he made the observation that some of the colonialists were ignorant, and not well-prepared for the duties they were assigned, and therefore had no business running the lives of Nigerians. For this essay, he was punished for challenging the status quo, and suspended from college in his final academic year. However, he sat for and passed the final teacher's examination as an external student a year later. He later dropped the middle name "Daniel" as protest against his perceived oppression by the colonial authorities.

In 1932, Olowofoyeku accepted a starting position as a pupil teacher at Otapete Methodist School, before beginning his teacher training at St. Andrew's College.

== Teaching career ==
Olowofoyeku taught at Oduduwa College from October 1942 until 1943. His students included Richard Akinjide, later Attorney General of Nigeria. From 1943 until January 1947, he was the Latin teacher at Methodist Boys High School, Lagos. His first appointment as Principal was at Western Boys High School, Benin, from January 1947 until December 1948. During this tenure in 1948, he took and passed the External Intermediate BA degree of the University of London by studying through a correspondence course.

Olowofoyeku moved to Ijebu-Ode to take up an appointment as the 3rd Principal of Olu-Iwa College (which changed its name to Adeola Odutola College in 1964), serving from January 1949 until December 1949.

== Legal career ==
In defence of a lawsuit initiated against him in 1948, Olowofoyeku researched and provided instructions to his defence attorney in court. When the case was decided in his favour, he decided to change career and enter the legal profession, and gained admission into the London School of Economics (LSE) to study law. He left Nigeria in December 1949 and passed the LLB (Bachelor of Laws) in June 1952. He passed the English Bar exams, and was invited to the Bar association (Inner Temple) as a barrister-at-law. He was the first Ijesha man called to the English Bar.

He returned to Nigeria just before Christmas in 1952.

== Political career ==
Olowofoyeku had experienced the social injustices and powerlessness associated with his prejudicial treatment as a student at St. Andrew's College, and was determined to find a political platform to fight against the system that created it. Urged by the nationalistic teachings of Herbert Macaulay, he became acquainted with Nnamdi Azikiwe, leader of the NCNC, through Chief Odeleye Fadahunsi, another Ijesha elder visiting London.

Olowofoyeku joined the NCNC in 1952, and became an executive member of the NCNC under Azikiwe in 1954. The Colony and Protectorate of Nigeria was superseded in October 1954 by the Federation of Nigeria, a federal colony which eventually gained extensive self-government within the British Empire. The United Kingdom finally granted the Federation independence as a dominion within the Commonwealth of Nations on 1 October 1960.

Olowofoyeku was elected as chairman of Ilesha Urban District Council (IUDC) in 1956, and in the same year won his election to the Western Region's House of Assembly. During this tenure, he sought to modernise Ilesha to the standards he had witnessed being achieved by London County Council during his studies in London. His accomplishments in Ilesha included installation of pipe-borne water, electricity, market development, town planning, road constructions, sanitation and council staff welfare.

Olowofoyeku was a member of the NCNC delegates' team to the Nigerian Constitutional Conferences in London of 1957 and 1958, the objectives of which were to seek Nigerian Independence from Britain. He was also elected into the Western House of Assembly in 1956 on the platform of the NCNC representing Ilesha Central Constituency. Olowofoyeku was a member of the NCNC Committee on Africa and Foreign Affairs. He also headed the NCNC Legal Defence Committee, which also included Richard Akinjide, Chief Adeniran Ogunsanya, Kehinde Sofola, and Tunji Ogunbiyi.

Olowofoyeku was a distinguished opposition House member even though not a member of Action Group (Nigeria) (AG), the ruling party of Obafemi Awolowo. Awolowo's assessment of the political abilities of Olowofoyeku was that: "He [Olowofoyeku] had a good sense of justice and belief in democracy".

Having gained independence from the British as a dominion on 1 October 1960, the Federation of Nigeria lasted until 1 October 1963, when it became a republic within the Commonwealth called the Federal Republic of Nigeria. In 1963, Olowofoyeku was appointed Minister of Education, replacing Sanya Onabamiro. However, after the creation of the Mid-Western State in July 1963, Olowofoyeku was installed as Attorney General and Minister of Justice of the Western Region from 26 September 1963. He was also at the same time appointed a Queen's Counsel (QC) by the British Government, as recognition of his official legal duties to the Commonwealth.

Due to internal political strife within the NCNC and under-representation of the West in the federal cabinet, Olowofoyeku and other Western Nigeria NCNC members in the legislature decided to align themselves with Akintola into the newly formed Nigerian National Democratic Party (NNDP) in 1964. Olowofoyeku's constituents in Ilesha were angry and viewed this move suspiciously and unfavorably. Consequently, his previously staunch support among them quickly vanished. The NCNC and AG now formed a new national alliance, UPGA (United Progressive Grand Alliance) against the ruling NPC/NNDP alliance. When election time came in December 1965, it was payback time. There was chaos throughout the country, particularly in the West and especially in Ilesha. Olowofoyeku escaped an assassin's bullet by a few inches during a campaign rally near Ilesha.

In the aftermath of the December 1965 elections, there was a bloody military coup on 15 January 1966, establishing a National Military Government. Olowofoyeku was arrested and taken into custody by the Military Government on 30 January 1966 and detained for six months. He was first detained at Agodi in Ibadan and later transferred to KiriKiri in Lagos. He was allowed very limited family visitation rights throughout his political incarceration at KiriKiri.

Olowofoyeku was released after the second counter coup on 29 July 1966 that was carried out by soldiers of Northern Nigerian extraction who replaced the old military regime of Major-General Aguiyi-Ironsi. After being set free, Olowofoyeku vowed never to get involved in partisan politics again. Within weeks of his release in July 1966, he had left Nigeria and departed for Paris, France, to seek rest and refuge.

== Later legal career ==
On his return to Nigeria late in 1967, Olowofoyeku moved to Lagos and re-opened his law practice in Western House on Broad Street near the Lagos High Court. He continued to practice law for many years, during which time he was one of the first 20 to be appointed as a Senior Advocate of Nigeria (the equivalent of the Queen's Counsel in the UK).

Despite being approached by Obafemi Awolowo in 1979 to come and join his new Unity Party of Nigeria (UPN), Olowofoyeku declined. He later relocated his legal practice to his home in Victoria Island, Lagos.

== Death ==
On 26 March 2003, at the age of 85, Olowofoyeku died. His funeral, which lasted several days, was held partly in the High Court in Lagos, at his main residence in Victoria Island, and at his two homes in Ilesha.

== Personal life ==
Olowofoyeku was married, and had at least 17 children (13 sons and 4 daughters), who include musician Toby Foyeh and actress Folake Olowofoyeku. He has many grandchildren and several great-grandchildren.
