= Toby Foyeh =

British-Nigerian musician and guitarist

- Born: Tokunbo Olowofoyeku; London, England
- Genres: Yoruba traditional; Africa jam; Afro beat; highlife; pop; rock; funk; jazz
- Occupations: Singer; songwriter; guitarist; producer
- Instruments: Vocals; guitar; talking drums; keyboards; flute
- Years active: 1981–present
- Labels: Taretone Records; Space Station Records; Kameleon and Kameleon Africa Records; Toby Foyeh Soundwave Records
- Website: tobyfoyeh.com

Tokunbo Olowofoyeku (Yoruba: Tòkunbọ̀ Olówòfóyèkù, pronounced [tòkũ̄bɔ̀ ōlówòfójèkù]), professionally known as Toby Foyeh, is a British-Nigerian musician. Born in London, England, to Nigerian parents, he is currently based in the Washington, D.C. area of the US. Although essentially self-taught, he studied music at Berklee College of Music and Howard University, where he also earned a degree in Film Directing.

Foyeh's albums are Here I Come in Nigeria, Jalolo (1999/2001), Lagos Ilu Eko (2006) released in the US, Canada, and Europe, and Pirates of Africa (2019). The debut album Here I Come produced the singles "Ore mi" and "I'm on Fire". "Jalolo" and "Rain Dance" are key tracks from Jalolo and Lagos Ilu Eko. African Festival was released in September 2021. A future CD/Vinyl album 'The Land of Spirits' is scheduled for release in 2025.

Foyeh has performed extensively on Nigerian Television and his music videos have been played for many years. With his band, Orchestra Africa, he has performed in the United Kingdom, Europe, United States, Canada, Caribbean, Japan and Africa. He is uncle to Kwame Jackson, the runner-up in NBC's 2004 The Apprentice.

== Early life and education ==
Foyeh was born in London, England, grew up mainly in Western Nigeria before progressing to embark on university education at Berklee College of Music and Howard University in the USA. He is the fifth child of Chief Babatunji Olowofoyeku, a Nigerian politician and the former Attorney General of the Western Region in Nigeria's First Republic (1960–1966). From the age of 5, he attended Children's Home School, Ibadan and then transferred to Abadina School (University of Ibadan) and finished his primary education at St Johns School, Iloro, Ilesha.

From St Johns School, Foyeh was admitted to King's College, Lagos, Nigeria. He then attended International School Ibadan in Nigeria. Upon completion of his high school education, he relocated to the US and attended Berklee College of Music in Boston, Massachusetts and Howard University in Washington, D.C.

== Career ==
Toby started playing music at an early age in Nigeria, with school bands at King's College, Lagos and International School Ibadan, as well as while studying in the United States. According to Nigerian custom and parental expectation, he was supposed to have become an engineer, a doctor or enter into the legal profession in the footsteps of his father, Chief Babatunji Olowofoyeku. Instead, he chose music. Foyeh was interested in modernising Nigerian and African music, and he sought to create a flux and synthesis between the two. A band he formed with some high school friends went on to tour America as Hugh Masekela's Ojah Band.

He has produced, recorded and co-produced for other artists with varying musical styles including African, Jazz and Soul. One such project was with keyboard player Roy Carter (ex-Heatwave (band)) produced a dance hit for UK group Covergirl, while other musical collaborations include projects with Jake Sollo (ex-Osibisa), Saul Malinga (Ipi Tombi South African Music and Dance Troupe) and Orlando Julius Ekemode.

== Musical style and influences ==
Foyeh's early influences from West Africa include Haruna Ishola, Victor Uwaifo and Fela Kuti. His influences from the USA include the likes of Miles Davis, Jimi Hendrix, Carlos Santana and George Benson. The music genres and styles that feature is his music are Yoruba Traditional, Africa Jam, Afro Beat, Highlife, Pop, Rock, Funk, and Jazz.

== Awards and achievements ==
- Scholarship award for the BA (final year) at Howard University, Washington, D.C.
- Scholarship award for two years at International School Ibadan, Nigeria
- International World Music Award, Boston for his contribution to Music and the Arts worldwide, April 2000
- Ore Mi The song Ore mi is now the artist's most successful single since its release on the 'Here I Come' debut album.

== Discography ==
Toby has released a range of CDs, 12-inch vinyl singles and albums over a period of almost forty years.

- Here I Come (1981)
- "Danger Zone" (with Andy Sodjka) (1984)
- "I'm a winner (Covergirl)" (1985)
- "Stay With Me (Covergirl)" (1986)
- "Hollywood City" (1986)
- Jalolo (UK) (1991)
- Jalolo (USA) (1999)
- Ilu Eko (Lagos) (2006)
- "Ore Mi" (single, 2017)
- 'Pirates of Africa' (2019)
- 'African Festival (2021)

Labels: Taretone Records, Space Station Records, Kameleon and Kameleon Africa Records, Toby Foyeh Soundway Records

== Tours ==
Toby Foyeh and Orchestra Africa have performed at many US universities as well as performing arts centers including Kennedy Center and Cerritos Center, Cerritos, California. Also the UK-based saxophonist and keyboard player Tunday Akintan has toured with Foyeh's band and the US-based TolumiDE sings as a backup vocalist and opening act for the band

The band has been on tour internationally and performed in many International Jazz Festivals such as Malta Jazz Festival, Toronto Jazz Festival (thrice), Montreal International Jazz Festival, Vancouver Jazz Festival, Calgary Jazz Festival, Medicine Hat Jazz Festival, Detroit Jazz Festival, Syracuse Jazz Festival, Washington DC Jazz Festival, Bahamas Jazz Festival, Jamaica Ocho Rios Jazz Festival, Grenada Spice Jazz Festival, Curaçao Jazz Festival and Fuji Rock Festival, Niigata, Japan

There have also been tours and performances in Nigeria, and London, England. The band has performed at many Performing Arts Centers including Kennedy Center and Cerritos Center Cerritos Ca plus many US and UK Universities.

== Family ==
Foyeh has 14 brothers and two sisters who live variously in the US, the UK and Nigeria. One of his younger brothers is Abimbola Olowofoyeku, a professor of Law at Brunel University London. His youngest sister is Hollywood actress Folake Olowofoyeku.

Foyeh's nephew Kwame Jackson was the runner-up in NBC's 2004 The Apprentice, hosted by Donald Trump. His nephew Toluwalakin Olowofoyeku was one of the three on Kugali team that created a Nigerian animated mini-series Iwájú for Disney+, released in February 2024.
