= List of Trinidad and Tobago films =

A list of films produced by, or made on location in, Trinidad and Tobago:

Title	Production year
Affair in Trinidad	1952
Fire Down Below	1957
Heaven Knows, Mr. Allison	1957
Swiss Family Robinson	1960
Trinidad and Tobago	1964
The Right and the Wrong	1970
The Caribbean Fox	1970
Bim	1974
Bacchanal Time	1978
Girl from India	1982
Obeah	1987
Crossing Over	1989
The Last Island	1990
Men of Gray	1990
The Hummingbird Tree	1992
Innocent Adultery	1994
What My Mother Told Me	1995
Flight of the Ibis	1996
Enter the Black Dragon	1997
The Panman	1997
The Mystic Masseur	2001
Diamonds from the Bantus	2002
Ivan the Terrible	2004
Joebell and America	2004
Jeffrey's Calypso	2005
JAB! The Blue Devils of Paramin	2006
A Loss of Innocence	2006
SistaGod	2006
Contract Killers	2008
Backlash	2007
Coolie Pink & Green	2009
HappySAD	2009
Minutes to Midnite	2009
Caribbean Skin African Identity	2010
Dulha Mil Gaya	2010
Limbo	2010
Married People	2010
The Solitary Alchemist	2010
Y-ning?	2010
Calypso Rose, the Lioness of the Jungle	2011
Dark Tales From Paradise	2011
Doubles with Slight Pepper	2011
Pothound	2011
Between Friends	2012
I'm Santana: the Movie	2012
Captain T&T	2013
Home Again	2013
Welcome to Warlock: Land of the Lawless	2014
Haunted Party	2014
Ants 3D	2014
Haiti Bride	2014
Insects 3D	2015
Bazodee	2015
Sally's Way	2015
The Cutlass	2017
Green Days by the River	2017
Moving Parts	2017
Sorf Hair	2017
Hero	2019
Jump!	2020
Fantastic Friday	2023
Douen II	2025
Mas Prep (series)	2020-2025
