= List of Caribbean films =

Films made in the Caribbean islands include the following, listed by island of origin.

== Antigua and Barbuda ==
- Diablesse (2005)
- Hooked (2009)
- The Island (1980)
- No Seed (2002)
- Once in an Island (2009)
- Redemption of Paradise (2010)
- The Skin (2011)
- The Sweetest Mango (2001)
- Working Girl (2011)
- The West Indian Terrance Harris(2020)

== Aruba ==
- Sabine (1982)
- Dera Gai (1990)
- E Secreto (2002)
- Heb het Lief (2010)
- 10 Ave Maria (2011)
- Awa Brak (2012)
- Siblings (2012)
- Abo So (2013)
- Back of Beyond (2013)
- The Package (2015)
- Alto Vista (2015)
- Siñami Stimabo (2016)
- Libre de Pecado (2016)
- E Yobida di Ayera (2016)
- Natalia (2017)

== Barbados ==
- Island in the Sun starring Harry Belafonte (1957), American-British movie
- The Tamarind Seed (1974), American-British movie
- Black Snake (1973), American film directed by Russ Meyer
- Agatha Christie's Miss Marple - A Caribbean Mystery (1989)
- Chattel House (2004)
- Guttaperc (1998)
- The Shoe (2005)
- Hit for Six (2006)
- Tek Dem Out (2006)
- Hush 1 (2008)
- Hush 2 (2009)
- Hush 3 (2011)
- A Hand Full of Dirt (2011)
- Chrissy (2012)
- Payday (2013)
- Keeping up with the Joneses: The Movie (2013)
- Auntie (2013)
- Vigilante - The Crossing (2015)
- A Bajan Story (2016)
- Barrow - Freedom Fighter (2016)
- Trident - The Land We Call Home (2019)
- Camouflage - TV Series Pilot (2022)

== Belize ==
- Risking It All (2005)
- Tussen wind en water (1991)

== Curaçao ==
- Ava and Gabriel, Felix de Rooy (1990)
- Almacita Desolato, Felix de Rooy (1991)
- Sensei Redenshon (2013)
- Tula, Dolph van Stapele (2015)
- Doubleplay, Ernest Dickerson (2017)
- Vliegende Vissen verdrinken niet, Janga (2020)

== Grenada ==
- Blinded (2006)
- The Sailor (2021)

== Guyana ==
- Aggro seizeman (1975)
- Guyana 1838
- Rainbow Raani (2006)
- The Terror and the Time (1976)

== Martinique ==
Year	Title	Director	Genre	Notes
2012	30° Couleur	Lucien Jean-Baptiste; Philippe Larue		
2004	Biguine	Guy Deslauriers		
1994	Exil du roi Behanzin, L′	Guy Deslauriers		
2006	Il était une fois... Sasha et Désiré	Cécile Vernant		
2000	Passage du milieu	Guy Deslauriers		aka The Middle Passage
2005	Pleine lune à Volga Plage	Camille Mauduech		
1983	Rue Cases-Nègres	Euzhan Palcy		aka Black Shack Alley, or Sugar Cane Alley
1992	Ultima rumba de papa Montero, La	Octavio Cortázar		

== Saint Lucia ==
- Heartfall (2025)
- Saint Lucia: The Wild Side (2025)

== Saint Vincent and the Grenadines ==
- The Bitter End (1992) by Maurice Horne Jr
- Work Attitude (1997) by Maurice Horne Jr

== Suriname ==
- Operation Makonaima (1974)
- Paramaribo Papers (2002) (TV)
- Suriname (2011)
- Wan Lobi Tori: Lesley en Anne (2005) (TV)
- Wan Pipel (1976)

== See also ==
- Cinema of the Caribbean
- Films set on Devil's Island
