= Cinema of the Caribbean =

Caribbean film industry

The Cinema of the Caribbean refers to the film industry in the Caribbean. Compared to earlier times, a significant amount of filmmaking occurred in the Caribbean in the 1980s and onward. Prior to this time, filmmaking in the Caribbean was relatively minor. For example, in the 1970s, only a few films were made in Guadeloupe, Haiti and Jamaica. In the 1970s and prior to this time, the Caribbean generally lacked an infrastructure for filmmaking and film distribution.

In contemporary times, the cinema of the Caribbean has been described as an "expanded and ever-expanding field." It has been suggested that it can be challenging to document all of the full-length, feature films that have been produced in the Caribbean, because each country has its own filmmaking industry that is separate from the other countries' industries.

== By country ==
=== Antigua and Barbuda ===
The Sweetest Mango is a 2001 film that was the first full-length feature film made in Antigua and Barbuda.

=== Cuba ===
Cinema arrived in Cuba at the beginning of the 20th century. Before the Cuban Revolution of 1959, about 80 full-length films were produced in Cuba. Most of these films were melodramas.

=== Grenada ===
Blinded is a 2006 film that was the first full-length film entirely produced in Grenada.

=== Trinidad and Tobago ===
In 1970, the Trinidad and Tobago productions The Right and the Wrong and The Caribbean Fox were the first English-language feature films produced by the West Indian industry.

From 2010 to 2015, an average of six full-length feature films were produced in Trinidad and Tobago. The Trinidad and Tobago Film Festival was founded in 2005 and occurs annually in the country. It focuses specifically upon Caribbean cinema, and also screens films from other areas of the world.

== See also ==
- Bahamas International Film Festival
- List of Caribbean films
- List of cinema of the world
- Third Cinema
