= Raoul Pantin =

Trinidadian journalist, editor and poet (1943–2015)

- Born: 5 June 1943; Trinidad
- Died: 15 January 2015 (aged 71); Cascade, Trinidad and Tobago
- Education: Fatima College; University of Chicago
- Occupations: Journalist, editor, poet and playwright
- Notable work: Days of Wrath: The 1990 Coup in Trinidad and Tobago

Raoul Pantin (5 June 1943 – 15 January 2015) was a Trinidad and Tobago journalist, editor, poet and playwright. He penned six plays during his career. Pantin survived the 1990 Jamaat al Muslimeen coup attempt and terrorist attack, in which he and other employees of the Trinidad and Tobago Television (TTT) station were held hostage for six days. He later chronicled his first-hand account of the coup attempt in a 163-page book, Days of Wrath: The 1990 Coup in Trinidad and Tobago.

== Early life and education ==
Pantin was born on 5 June 1943. He studied at Fatima College, a Roman Catholic secondary school in Port of Spain, Trinidad, and received his diploma in journalism from the Thomson Foundation in Cardiff, Wales. He also completed several seminars on journalism in the United States, including at the University of Chicago.

== Career ==
Pantin began his career in journalism and broadcasting in 1962 at NBS Radio 610. In 1963, he joined the staff of the Trinidad Daily Mirror newspaper. He later worked as a business and political reporter at both the Trinidad Guardian and the Trinidad Express. Pantin was also a former editor for the Trinidad Express.

Pantin wrote the screenplay for the 1974 Trinidadian film Bim, which was directed by Hugh A. Robertson and starred Ralph Maraj. Pantin wrote six plays, including Hatuey, which has been staged throughout the country. He authored four non-fiction books, including Black Power Day, which explored the Black Power Revolution in 1970, and The Trinidad Express Story, a history of the Trinidad Express newspaper, and Days of Wrath: The 1990 Coup in Trinidad and Tobago, his first-hand account of the 1990 Jamaat al Muslimeen coup attempt. Additionally, Pantin's published a collection of poems entitled Journey.

During the 1980s, Pantin was part of a team of journalists who are credited with expanding the coverage of the Trinidad and Tobago Television (TTT), the only television station in the country at the time. Under Pantin and the other journalists, television cameras were allowed to film proceedings within the Parliament of Trinidad and Tobago for the first time. Pantin hosted a weekly television program, Parliament Review, the first television show to report on Parliament with cameras positioned inside the legislative chamber. The filming of Parliament was pioneering at the time. Parliament is now widely covered through live television broadcasts.

=== Jamaat al Muslimeen coup d'état attempt ===
On 27 July 1990, Pantin and his colleagues were working at the Trinidad and Tobago Television headquarters when the station was attacked by members of Jamaat al Muslimeen who were attempting to stage a coup. Pantin and the other captures TTT employees were held hostage in the building by Jamaat al Muslimeen for six days and five nights. Other Jamaat al Muslimeen members had also seized nearby Red House, the seat of Parliament, and held Prime Minister A. N. R. Robinson, members of the Cabinet, and other government officials hostage as well. In his book Days of Wrath: The 1990 Coup in Trinidad and Tobago, Pantin recalled his reaction to the first moments of the attack, "I fought to control the tears, feeling sorry for myself and for Trinidad, the place I had grown up in and known, or thought I had known, and loved...I was overwhelmed by it all, fearful that this beautiful island, this extraordinary country of great intellectuals, poets, artists and everyday work people had been assaulted, brutalised, soiled – like the TTT building which seven days ago had been just a normal place to work." The siege ended after six days. Pantin and his colleagues were released from captivity in the station.

== Later life ==
In 2005, Pantin retired from his position as an editor with the Trinidad Express, where in 2013 he would start a weekly column, "Mark My Word", continuing to work as a columnist for the paper until his death in 2015. In 2006, he was honoured by both the Media Association of Trinidad and Tobago and the Trinidad and Tobago Publishers and Broadcasters Association (TTPBA).

Raoul Pantin died at his home in Cascade, Trinidad, on 15 January 2015, at the age of 71. He was survived by two daughters, Pilar and Mandisa. He also has one grandchild, Jaliyah Phillips.

== Selected publications ==
- Black Power Day
- Days of Wrath: The 1990 Coup in Trinidad and Tobago
- Journey (poems)
- The Trinidad Express Story
