= Yao Ramesar =

Caribbean filmmaker (born 1963)

- Born: 1963 (age 62–63); Tamale, Ghana

Robert Yao Ramesar (born 1963) is a Trinidadian and Tobagonian film director and screenwriter whose films address themes related to Caribbean culture and identity.

== Early years ==
Ramesar was born in Tamale, Ghana, to a Trinidadian father and a Jamaican mother. The family lived in Ghana, Trinidad and Tobago, Jamaica, and later Canada, before returning to Trinidad and Tobago in 1971.

In 1984, he enrolled at Howard University in Washington, D.C., where he studied film production at the School of Communications. He graduated summa cum laude with a Bachelor of Arts degree, and later completed a Master of Fine Arts in film directing under the mentorship of Ethiopian filmmaker Haile Gerima.

== Film career ==
=== 1990s ===
Ramesar made 44 short films during the 1990s. Some, like the earliest of his shorts Mami Wata (1992) focused heavily on the culture of Trinidad and Tobago, with Mami Wata featuring the first on-screen depiction of an Orisha feast for the goddess Oshun. He later filmed a series of interviews with the pioneers of the steelband movement, which includes Pan: The Overture (1993) and Pan under the Sapodilla Tree (1994). His work in the short film form also covered themes such as cricket (Spinner's Wicket, 1998), parang (Spanish Time, 1998) and the cottage industries created by people living near a garbage dump in Arima (Picking Up the Pieces, 1999).

=== 2000s ===
Ramesar was the featured filmmaker at Carifesta VII in Saint Kitts and Nevis (2000). Additionally, he filmed Trinidad and Tobago's cultural participation at Carifesta VIII in Suriname (2003) and chaired the Carifesta Film Committee in Trinidad and Tobago (2006).

In 2001, Ramesar participated in the Big River International Artists' Workshop and Exhibition. The following year, he directed the filming of the musical Carnival Messiah in the United Kingdom. His work was featured in the first National Sculpture Exhibition and at the first Kairi Film Festival in Trinidad in 2003.

In 2002 and 2003, Ramesar took part in many film festivals and workshops, such as the inaugural and second editions of the Festival of African and Caribbean Film, in Barbados; the Caribbean Input screening in Jamaica; the Zanzibar International Film Festival; the Cine Latino Film Festival in San Francisco; the Sin Fronteras workshop at the University of Wisconsin, Madison, a week-long workshop on Caribbean film; and Swimming Against the Tides, Caribbean Culture in the Age of Globalization, at Bowdoin College, Maine. His work was also featured at the VideoBrasil Festival, São Paulo, in 2003.

In 2006, Ramesar's fantasy drama SistaGod premiered at the Toronto International Film Festival and was subsequently screened at the Trinidad and Tobago Film Festival. The first chapter of a film trilogy, it tells the story of the coming of a Black female messiah (played by Evelyn Caesar Munroe) during a period known as the "Apocalypso". The movie integrated traditional Trinbagonian Carnival characters and a female lead into its narrative, whilst dealing with westernization, spiritualism and culture. Sistagod remains the sole Trinidad and Tobago feature film to gain official selection at a major international film festival.

In 2007, Ramesar became the first filmmaker in residence at the University of the West Indies (UWI). Film theory had been introduced to the UWI Film Programme in 2006 by the co-designers of the Bachelor of Arts in Film, Dr. Jean Antoine-Dunne, who taught film theory and aesthetics, and Dr. Bruce Paddington. In 2009, Ramesar wrote, produced, and directed Her Second Coming. The second chapter of his SistaGod trilogy, the film centers on SistaGod (played by albino actress/singer Crystal Felix) and her progeny battling for survival in a post-apocalyptic world devoid of human life. The film made its world premiere at the Trinidad and Tobago Film Festival in the same year.

In 2009, Ramesar co-founded the Caribbean Travelling Film School, an organization designed to provide filmmaking training across the Caribbean region. This is, in part, a continuum of a blueprint he developed in the 1980s for the consolidation of a regional cinema, which would involve filmmakers travelling in Caribbean communities and fostering a citizens' cinema, which he termed "The Moving Image".

=== 2010s ===
In 2010, Ramesar worked on his yet-to-be-released third feature film, Stranger in Paradise, which involved a Chinese woman arriving in Barbados speaking only Mandarin. In 2014, Ramesar flew to South Africa to begin work on his next feature film, Shade, which centred on a young albino woman (Mathapelo Ditshego) from Soshanguve, South Africa, with dreams of becoming an R&B singer.

Ramesar's next feature film, Haiti Bride, released in 2014, is the story of a Haitian-born woman who returns to her homeland to meet her husband, who lost his memory after the 2010 Haiti earthquake. Shot entirely on location in Haiti, it was the first African diaspora/Caribbean feature film selected in the 2015 feature film competition at the Pan African Film & Television Festival, Africa's largest and oldest film festival, in Ouagadougou, Burkina Faso. Ramesar was the first Caribbean filmmaker in the festival's history to compete for the Etalon de Yennenga award.

In July and August 2015, he visited India, specifically Mumbai, Delhi, Agra and Goa, where he continued fostering partnerships with film schools, as well as researching film education and production infrastructures. He met with the heads of film schools in Delhi, including Jamia Millia Islamia and the Asian Academy of Film and Television at Film City, New Delhi, to explore partnerships between their institutions. The discussions focused on potential co-productions, undergraduate exchange programs, and postgraduate opportunities for students of the University of the West Indies, St. Augustine Campus.

In December 2015, he screened Haiti Bride at both the 2015 edition of the Ghetto Biennale, a cross-cultural arts festival held in Port-au-Prince, Haiti, and in the commune of Jacmel, where most of the film was shot.

== Screenings ==
Ramesar's films were screened internationally at film festivals and cultural institutions, including events in the Caribbean, North America, and Europe. These screenings included Caribbean multi-channel cable simulcasts (California) 1992/93, WHMM-32 (Washington) 1990, European Media Arts Festival (Germany) 1992, Reel Caribe (Toronto) 1996, MIDEM (Cannes) 1996, Smithsonian Institution (Washington) 1992, Oakland Museum of California 1992, Athens International Film Festival 1992, Darryl Reich Rubenstein Gallery (Virginia) 1987, Washington DC Artworks 1988, Carifesta V, VI, VII, VIII and IX (1994, 1995, 2000, 2003 and 2006) and the "Sing Me a Rainbow" Meridian International Center's US-wide touring exhibition, 1998, the Noir Tout Couleurs Festival of Cinema (Guadeloupe) 1998 & 1999.

In 2000, the Jornada Film Festival in Bahia, Brazil, the BRNO16 Film Festival in the Czech Republic and the Tabernacle Trust Exhibition of Films on Trinidad Carnival (London) featured Ramesar's work. That year, the Cavehill Film Society, Barbados, also screened a retrospective of Ramesar's works. In 2001, his work was screened at Fespaco's International Festival of African Cinema in Burkina Faso, and in 2001 and 2003 at Cinefest Nuestra America in Wisconsin. His films were also included in the IDB's First Latin and Caribbean Video Art Exhibition, which toured cities throughout the Americas, as well as Washington DC and Rome.

In 2004, he was a delegate at the Art Council of England's A Free State conference, at the British Museum, where he screened selected work. He was also a featured artist at the Lighting the Shadow exhibition at CCA7. His work was also screened at the Museum Ludwig (Cologne) 2005; The Horniman Museum (London) 2006; Jakmel Film Festival (Haiti) 2006; Flashpoint Film Festival (Jamaica) 2006 and the Pan African Film Festival (Los Angeles) 2007; Bridgetown Film Festival (Barbados) 2007; Black Harvest Film Festival (Chicago) 2007; The British Museum (London) 2007; Caribbean Tales (Toronto) 2007; GRULAC (Johannesburg) 2007; Kerala International Film Festival (India) 2008; Kampala Film Festival (Uganda) 2008; DC-Caribbean Film Festival (United States) 2008 and The Caribbean Film Festival (New York) 2008.

In 2008, a documentary feature based on Ramesar's work entitled "Films of Yao Ramesar" made its premiere at the DC-Caribbean Film Festival.

== Publications ==
Ramesar's filmography was the subject of Filmed Portraits: an Examination of Themes and the Pictorial Techniques of Yao Ramesar, from his short film series "People", an 87-page work by Pamela Hosein (University of the West Indies), 1998, and a subsequent MPhil thesis by the same author completed in 2008. His work is also examined in PhD theses, including one by Marina Maxwell (University of the West Indies).

2006 saw the completion of a PhD thesis on Ramesar's work entitled Being, Consciousness and Time: Phenomenology and the Videos of Robert Yao Ramesar (G. Hezekiah/University of Toronto). This was published in 2009 as Phenomenology’s Material Presence (Intellect Books/UK and Chicago University Press/US).

Ramesar has authored several articles on Caribbean filmmaking, including "Colour, Light & Signification in the Mise-en-Scène of SISTAGOD" (Caribbean Intransit Arts Journal. Volume I. Issue 2 – March 2012); "The Eye-alect of Her Second Coming" (ARC Magazine – Art, Recognition, Culture. Issue 3 – July 2011; "Haiti: Picking Up the Pieces" (article and photo essay – St. Augustine News – April/July 2011); "Caribbeing: Cultural Imperatives and the Technology of Motion Picture Production" (Caribbean Quarterly, Vol. 42, No. 4, and Caribbean Culture and in the Digital Domain (presented at the Carifesta Symposia 2000, St. Kitts/Nevis).

== Filmography ==
=== Short films ===
Year	Title	Notes
1985	American Dream	
1986	Grey	
1987	Going Up	
1987	Confessions of Brother Man	
1988	Going Up	
1989	Rum & Coke	
1990	Bhava Tanha	
1991	Blue Eyes	
1992	Mami Wata	
1992	Clear D' Way	
1993	Pan: The Overture	
1994	Pan Under the Sapodilla Tree	
1995	The Kindest Cut	
1995	Strings & Steel	
1995	Caribbeing	
1995	Songs Across the Rainbow Bridge	
1995	Jahaaji Mai	
1996	Mayaro: The Drum, The Bois & The Moon	
1996	Testament	
1996	Re-Generation	
1996	Parlour People	
1997	Joe Polle's Scarborough Sax	
1997	A Wedding in Moriah	
1997	Mr. Washington's Place in History	
1997	Destiny: Live from Black Rock	
1998	Children of Fatel Razack	
1998	Minstrel Lady	
1998	Robber Talk	
1998	Black Indian	
1998	Fire Dance	
1998	Masquerade	
1998	Batman	
1998	Doubles: Bara Part 1 & Bara Part 2	
1998	Boat a' Dem	
1998	Spinner's Wicket	
1998	Spanish Time	
1998	Chinese Medicine	
1998	Original People	
1998	First People	
1998	A Man of the People	
1999	Olokun: Lord & Mistress of the Deep	
1999	I, Marcus Garvey	
1999	Dancing in the Light	
1999	Body Language	
1999	Stepsisters	
1999	Longdenville Diva	
1999	Foundation	
1999	Spirits Rising	
1999	Picking up the Pieces	
1999	Journey to Ganga Mai	
2000	Celebration	
2000	Man of Steel	
2001	Coronation	
2001	The Saddhu of Couva	
2001	B.C. (Before Columbus)	
2002	Awake	
2002	Bois	
2003	In My Skin	
2003	A Brief History of Queen's Hall	
2003	Tobago to Africa & Back	
2003	Jackie Hinkson: The Work of Art	
2003	An Animated Conversation with Camille Selvon	
2003	Super Moxi Patu	
2003	Canboulay	
2004	The A.B.C's of Traditional Mas	
2004	Carnival Messiah	

=== Feature-length films ===
- 2006 – SistaGod
- 2009 – SistaGod II: Her Second Coming
- 2010 – Stranger in Paradise
- 2014 – Shade
- 2014 – Haiti Bride
