= Herman Witkam =

Dutch composer and multi-instrumentalist (born 1985)

- Born: 19 March 1985 (age 40)
- Origin: Leiden, Netherlands
- Genres: Film scores
- Occupations: Composer, Multi-instrumentalist, Sound designer, producer
- Instruments: Duduk, Shakuhachi, Guitar, Bass guitar, Udu, Quena, Bawu, Hulusi, Low whistle, Native American flute, Recorder, Fujara, Darabuka
- Years active: 2005–present

Herman Witkam (born 19 March 1985) is a Dutch composer and multi-instrumentalist, best known for his scores to motion pictures. During his studies at the Utrecht School of the Arts, Witkam worked on a number of online shorts through the DVXUser online film festivals. For two of these films, Rekindled and A Little Mouth to Feed, both directed by Jack Daniel Stanley, Witkam won awards at the Shriekfest and HollyShorts Film Festival respectively.

== Career ==
After graduating, Witkam started working mainly on feature films and television drama, but also documentaries, such as Eric Walter's My Amityville Horror, which screened at the BFI London Film Festival and Fantastic Fest, and was named one of the top 15 festival horror films of 2012 by Bloody Disgusting. The Dutch mobile phone thriller APP, for which Witkam composed a hybrid score of orchestra and electronics was released in a limited theatrical run in the US on May 9, 2014, and uses audio digital watermarking technology to give viewers a fully integrated second screen that complements the film. Witkam also scored the youth drama Spijt (Regret), which received grand prizes at the Giffoni Film Festival, the Toronto International Film Festival's TIFF Kids and the European Film Award in the youth category, amongst a total of around 30 festival awards worldwide.

== Ethnic Instruments ==
Witkam frequently uses traditional musical instruments like the Armenian duduk and Japanese shakuhachi in his work, which he performs himself, often using improvisation as a composing technique. As a multi-instrumentalist, Herman has performed on video game titles such as Mortal Kombat 11, Total War Rome II and Dungeons & Dragons Tactics, and internationally co-produced pictures such as The Seven of Daran: Battle of Pareo Rock and The King Maker.

== Selected filmography ==
Film
Year	Title
2010	Golden Earrings
2011	Train to Stockholm
2011	Mila's Journey
2011	Claustrofobia
2012	My Amityville Horror
2012	Mike Says Goodbye
2012	Class Of Fun (aka Mister Twister)
2013	Regret!
2013	APP
2013	Sensei Redenshon
2013	Mister Twister Goes Camping
2013	According To Robert
2014	Painkillers
2014	Hamartía - More Or Less Louis van Gasteren
2014	Mister Twister On Stage
2015	According To Jacqueline
2016	The Free Market
2016	Mister Twister At The Pitch
2017	Mister Twister (drama series, S1)
2017	My Giraffe
2019	Mister Twister 5
2020	Mister Twister (drama series, S2)

== Awards and nominations ==
=== Awards ===
- 2010 HollyShorts Film Festival - Best music - A Little Mouth to Feed
- 2010 Shriekfest - Best Music - Rekindled
- 2011 Eindhoven Film Festival - Best Music - Prosopagnosia

=== Nominations ===
- 2008 Action On Film International Film Festival Best Music - Berlin
