= Cucurbit =

Cucurbit may refer to:-

- A plant of the family Cucurbitaceae
- The lower part of an alembic
- Cucurbit flute, Chinese musical instrument
