= Bawu =

Chinese wind instrument

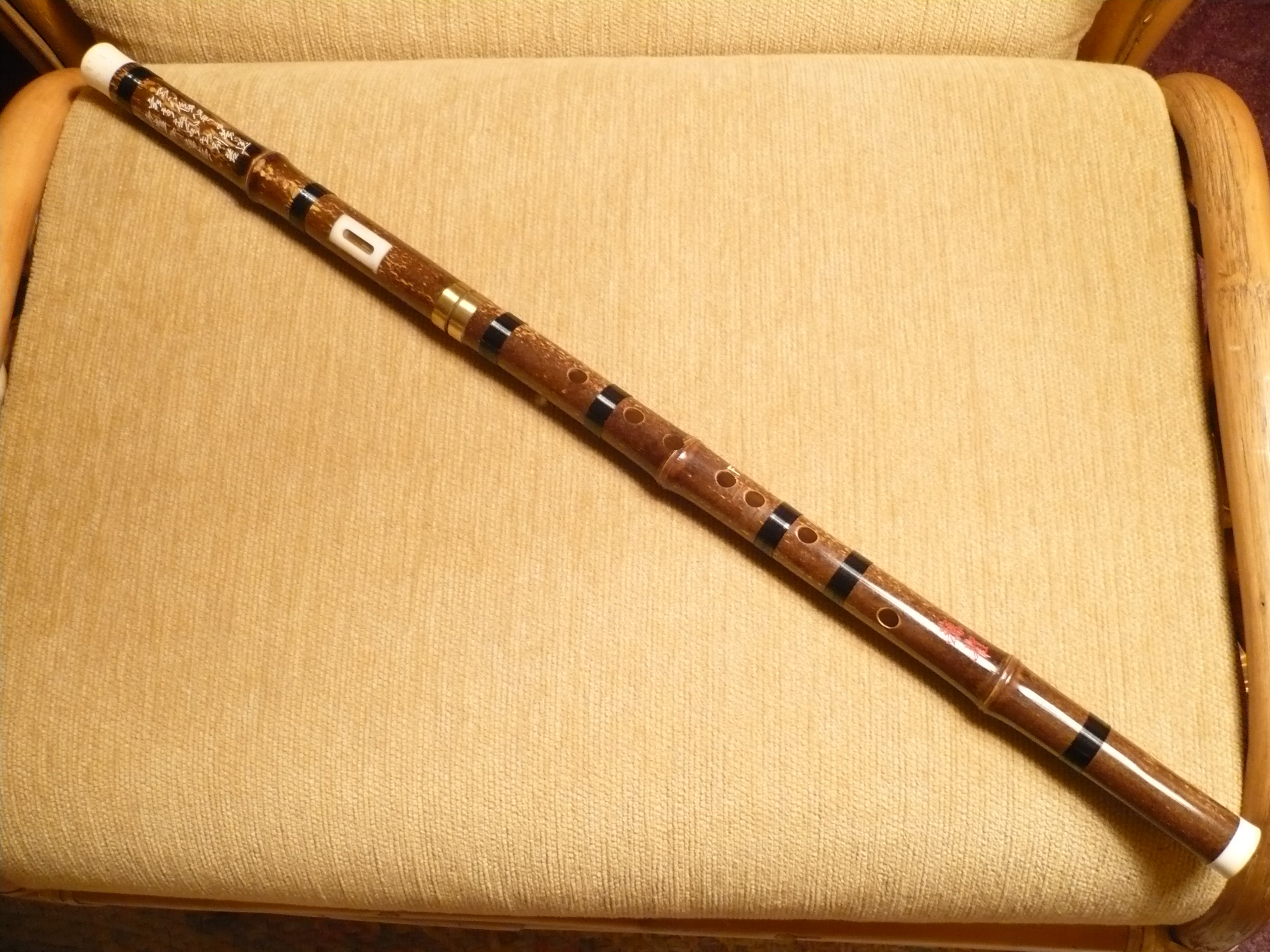
A bawu in the key of F

The bawu (simplified Chinese: 巴乌; traditional Chinese: 巴烏; pinyin: bāwū; also ba wu) is a Chinese wind instrument. Although shaped like a flute, it is actually a free reed instrument, with a single metal reed. It is played in a transverse (horizontal) manner. It has a pure, clarinet-like timbre and its playing technique incorporates the use of much ornamentation, particularly bending tones.

The bawu likely originated in the Yunnan province of southwest China, it has become a standard instrument throughout China, used in modern Chinese compositions for traditional instrument ensembles. The instrument is also closely associated with Hmong, Yi, Hani and other minority cultures in southwestern China. It is typically used as a solo instrument, and is often featured in film scores; it is sometimes also heard in popular music recordings.

Although the bawu is still predominantly performed in China, it has in recent years been adopted by European composers and performers. Rohan Leach from England, Raphael De Cock from Belgium, Seán Mac Erlaine from Ireland and Herman Witkam from the Netherlands have all taken the instrument in new directions. The musician Guo Yue, who now resides in England, has long promoted the instrument and plays it on all of his recordings.

This type of instrument is also used during Chinese New Year by the Taiwanese people next to mainland China. It can be played by breathing in or out.

== Design and construction ==
The bawu is a free-reed aerophone with a cylindrical bore, made of a tube of bamboo closed off at one end by a natural node. Near the closed end, a small square hole is cut and a thin reed of bronze or copper is fastened, with a low plastic or bone mouthpiece around it. This reed is essentially a very thin sheet of metal with a long and narrow isosceles triangle cut into it, which is bent slightly outwards at rest. When the instrument is blown, this thin triangle moves back and forth rapidly through the space left in the metal sheet from which it was cut, like a swinging door. This vibration sets the air column in the instrument in rapid periodic motion, creating sound. The mouth does not contact the reed. Seven or eight finger-holes are positioned 90 degrees out of line with the reed, though this is adjustable in the common two-piece instruments provided with a metal tenon. The bawu typically has a range of an eleventh: on an instrument in "G" (according to Chinese custom the note with three upper finger holes down) this range is from B to E. The range is often misreported as a ninth, omitting two underblown notes. Instruments with mechanical keys are available (usually not in natural bamboo whose irregular shape would complicate construction), which expands the range upwards, or upwards and downwards a few notes. For a diatonic scale, the lower two notes are in the fundamental mode of the reed, and the rest of the range is overblown, exciting the vibratory mode of the resonating pipe. The lowest scale degree, and the lowest overblown note are a minor third apart and fingered the same way; this unusually narrow overblowing behavior suggests the instrument has some irregular overtones outside of the standard harmonic series.

The lowest part of the bawu range is very rich in upper harmonics, the lowest of which have amplitudes almost equivalent to that of the fundamental frequency. This results in a rather buzzing timbre that is vaguely harmonica-like and in terms of sound spectrum very typical of free-reed instruments. As successively higher notes are fingered, the upper harmonics are gradually extinguished; the even harmonics are disproportionately affected, resulting in an odd-harmonic-dominated sound in the upper range similar to the clarinet both in terms of spectrum characteristics and subjective tone color. The underblown notes are close to the fundamental frequency of the reed, but the overblown notes are slightly sharp of the fundamental frequency of the air column, suggesting relatively complex acoustics.

The player can initiate sound by either inhaling or exhaling, similar to the sheng. However, the upper notes will not speak and some of the lower notes are out of tune when inhaling.

This design is very similar to the Thai Pi so, common in piphat ensembles and the Hmong raj nplaim.

== See also ==
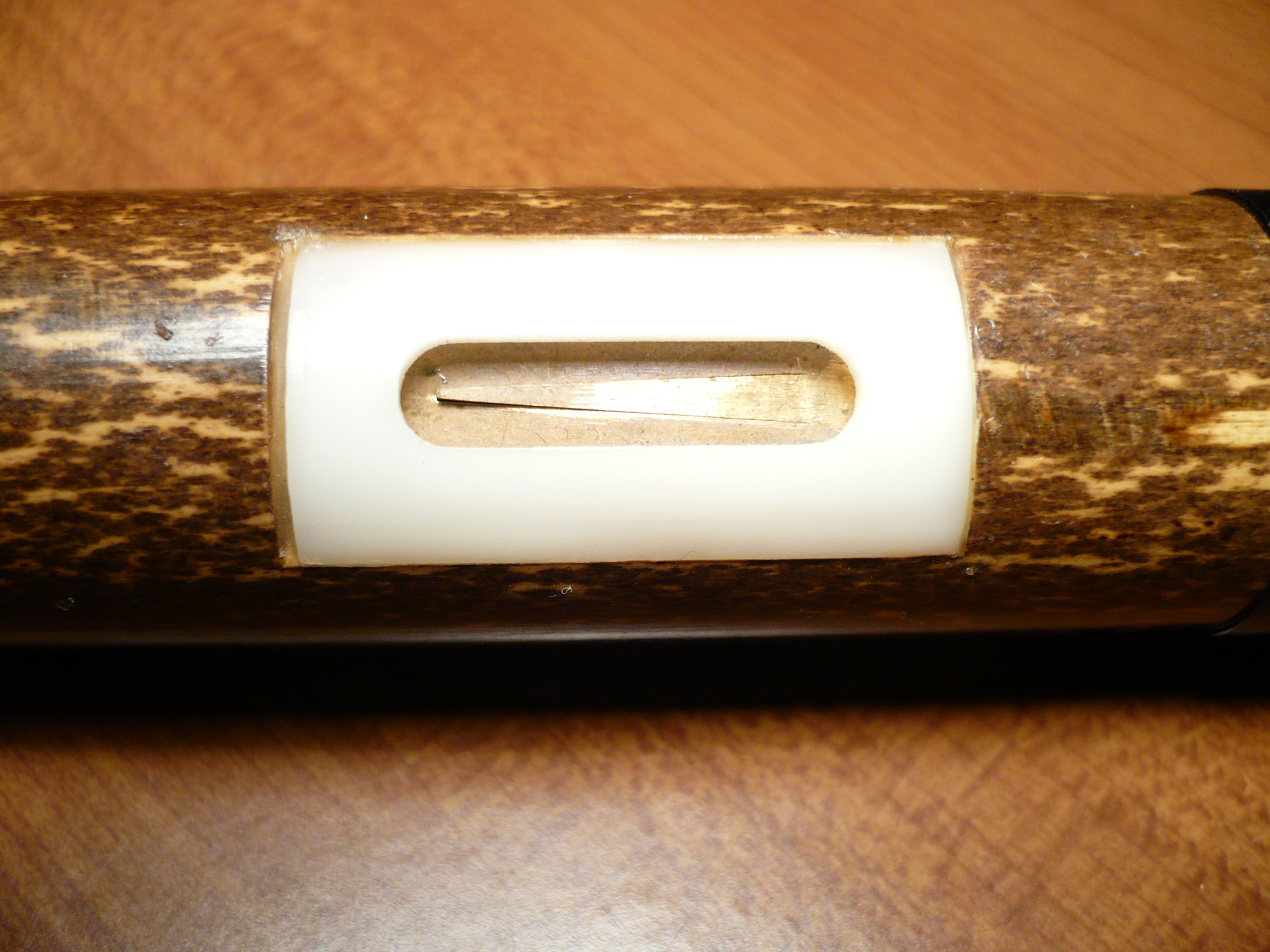
Closeup of the mouthpiece (containing a free reed) of a bawu in the key of F

- Hulusi, a related instrument with three pipes
- Traditional Chinese musical instruments
