= Haiti Bride =

2014 film

Haiti Bride is a 2014 Caribbean arthouse film written, produced and directed by Trinidadian filmmaker Robert Yao Ramesar. Starring Tahina Vatel, Lentz F. Durand, Ketia Lerine, Fabienne Lerine, Joanne Francois, Enice Lerine and Pariza Domond, it tells the story of Marie Thérèse (Vatel), a Haitian-born woman who returns to her homeland to meet her husband Paul (Durand), who lost his memory after the 2010 Haiti earthquake.

== Plot ==
Five years after her parents fled Haiti (following the 2004 coup d'état and subsequent removal of President Jean-Bertrand Aristide) and re-settled in New York City, Marie Thérèse (Tahina Vatel) meets and falls in love with Paul (Lentz F. Durand), a Haitian man visiting the city. Despite her parents' objections, Marie accepts Paul's wedding proposal. They both decide to get married in Haiti on January 12, 2010 - the day that the 2010 Haiti earthquake took place.

On Marie and Paul's first wedding anniversary, Marie returns to Haiti, where she proceeds to walk through Port-au-Prince in her wedding dress. Upon her arrival to the ruins of the cathedral where the wedding was held, she discovers three fragments of stained glass (colored red, blue and yellow) at the altar where Marie and Paul stood one year ago. In July 2012, Marie receives a call in New York from Paul, who is residing in Haiti. She requests that they meet in Port-au-Prince, where she intends to surprise him with the news that he is the father of her two-year-old son named Christophe. The turbulence experienced during the flight back to Haiti reminds Marie of the earthquake, and as a result, she contacts Paul upon her arrival, requesting that they meet in Cap-Haïtien (where initially they had planned to spend their honeymoon) instead of Port-au-Prince. Paul agrees to see Marie, but informs her that at the moment, he's "seeing friends". Through a brief voice-over narration by Paul, it is revealed that after the earthquake, he experiences difficulty in connecting with his emotions and confronting his past. After an unsuccessful attempt at recollecting his memories at the Port-au-Prince cathedral, Paul is transported to the commune of Jacmel on his friend's motorcycle.

In Jacmel, three weeks prior to his reunion with Marie, Paul spends time with his lover and fiancée Natasha (Ketia Lerine). Natasha harbors feelings of mistrust for Paul, who left for New York after the earthquake, and spent three years there without having ever contacted her. Upon his return to Haiti, Paul proposed to Natasha, much to the disapproval of her mother (Enice Lerine) and sister (Fabienne Lerine). During his stay in Jacmel, he receives a still camera from Natasha's father, an elderly Vodún painter (Pariza Domond), which he eventually uses to take pictures of the city. In her voice-over narration, Natasha expresses her desire for Paul to, one day, do an exhibit of his photographs, thereby showcasing the beauty of her hometown.

The following day, Natasha's father explains to Paul the inspiration behind one of his paintings, which depicts Paul and Marie in their wedding clothes on the altar of the cathedral. According to Natasha's father, the image of the wedding came to him in a dream he had on the day before the earthquake. He also reveals that he lost all his material possessions during the earthquake, with the exception of his paintbrush which he now uses to make his living as an artist.

Days later, during a vehicular tour of Haiti, Paul and Marie finally reunite. While exploring an abandoned château during the tour, Marie converses with Paul. She informs him that their son Christophe is currently in the United States, while Paul reveals to her that he lost his memory after the earthquake. Meanwhile, a disenchanted Natasha sits on a rocking chair inside her home, caressing Paul's motorcycle helmet. Outside the house, Natasha's father stares at a blank canvas. With a pencil, he makes a light sketch.

Suddenly, in a surrealistic, high-speed, monochrome-colored montage, all the preceding events in the film are shown in reverse. The montage concludes with a close-up of bride and groom cake toppers atop of a wedding cake before returning to the shot of Natasha's father and the blank canvas. The movie concludes with two scenes shown earlier: a shot of Marie and Paul (in their wedding clothes) standing within the ruins of the cathedral, followed by a scene where Marie stares at the three fragments of stained glass.

== Production history ==
Haiti Bride was funded in part by a grant from the St. Augustine (Trinidad) campus of the University of the West Indies (UWI). The film’s inception also took place in UWI, when director Yao Ramesar had a chance meeting with Haitian exchange student, Tahina Vatel, whom he later cast as Marie in the film. The first screen tests, writing and pre-production took place on campus at a time when the University housed a number of to Haitian students whose education had been disrupted by the 2010 earthquake.

== Release ==
The film's official premiere was at the UWI Film Building, St. Augustine, on September 19, 2014 during the Trinidad and Tobago Film Festival.
