= Robert de Hoog =

Dutch actor (born 1988)

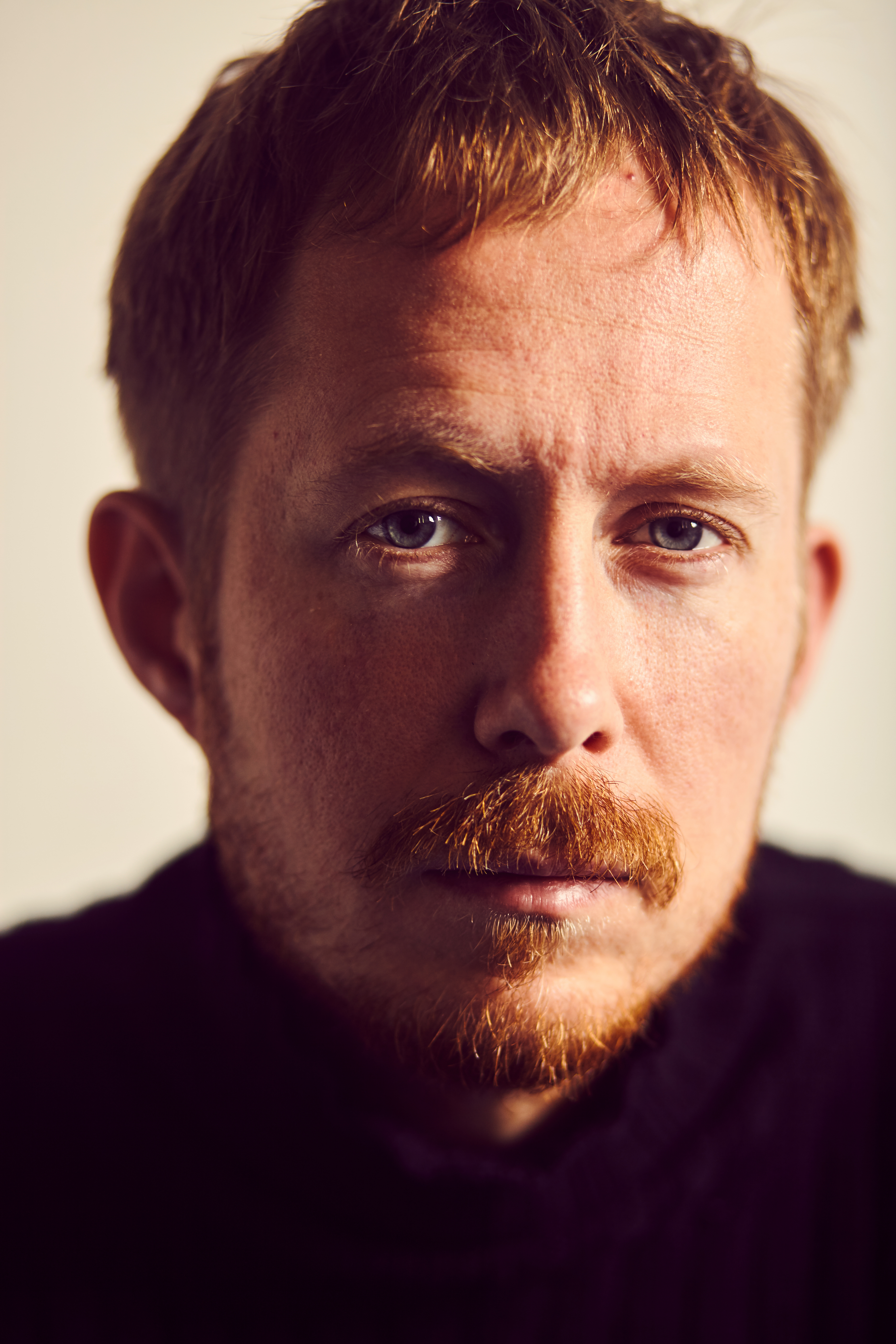
- Born: 18 November 1988 (age 36); Alphen aan de rijn, Netherlands
- Years active: 2006–present

Robert de Hoog (born 18 November 1988) is a Dutch actor.

== Filmography ==
Film
Year	Title	Role	Notes
2008	Skin	Frankie	Golden Calf for Best Actor
2010	Dusk	No name	
2011	Nova Zembla	Gerrit de Veer	
2012	Black Out	Gianni	
2013	APP	Tim Maas	
2016	The Fury	No name	
2019	Amsterdam Vice	Siem Looder	

== Theatre ==
Theatre
Year	Title	Role	Notes
2003-'04	De Ramayana	No name	Jeugdtheaterhuis
2004	Bataljen	No name	Homborsund Europees Theaterproject
2005-'06	Aap!	Hoofdrol	Jeugdtheaterhuis
2006-'07	Citizenship	No name	Jeugdtheaterhuis
2013	Bloedbruiloft	Bruidegom	Toneelgroep Amsterdam
2014	Totterdood	Robert	Toneelgroep Amsterdam
2014-'17	The Fountainhead	Steven Mallory, Alvah Scarret	Toneelgroep Amsterdam
2014	Maria Stuart	Paulet	Toneelgroep Amsterdam
2014'15	Othello	Cassio	Toneelgroep Amsterdam
2015	In Vrede	Jonas	Toneelgroep Amsterdam
2015-'17	Kings of war	Dauphin, Suffolk en Clarence	Toneelgroep Amsterdam
2016	Liliom	No name	Toneelgroep Amsterdam
2016-'17	Husbands and wives	Michael	Toneelgroep Amsterdam
2016	De dingen die voorbijgaan	Steyn de Weert	Toneelgroep Amsterdam
2017	Obsession	Johnny	Toneelgroep Amsterdam
