= Toneelgroep Amsterdam =

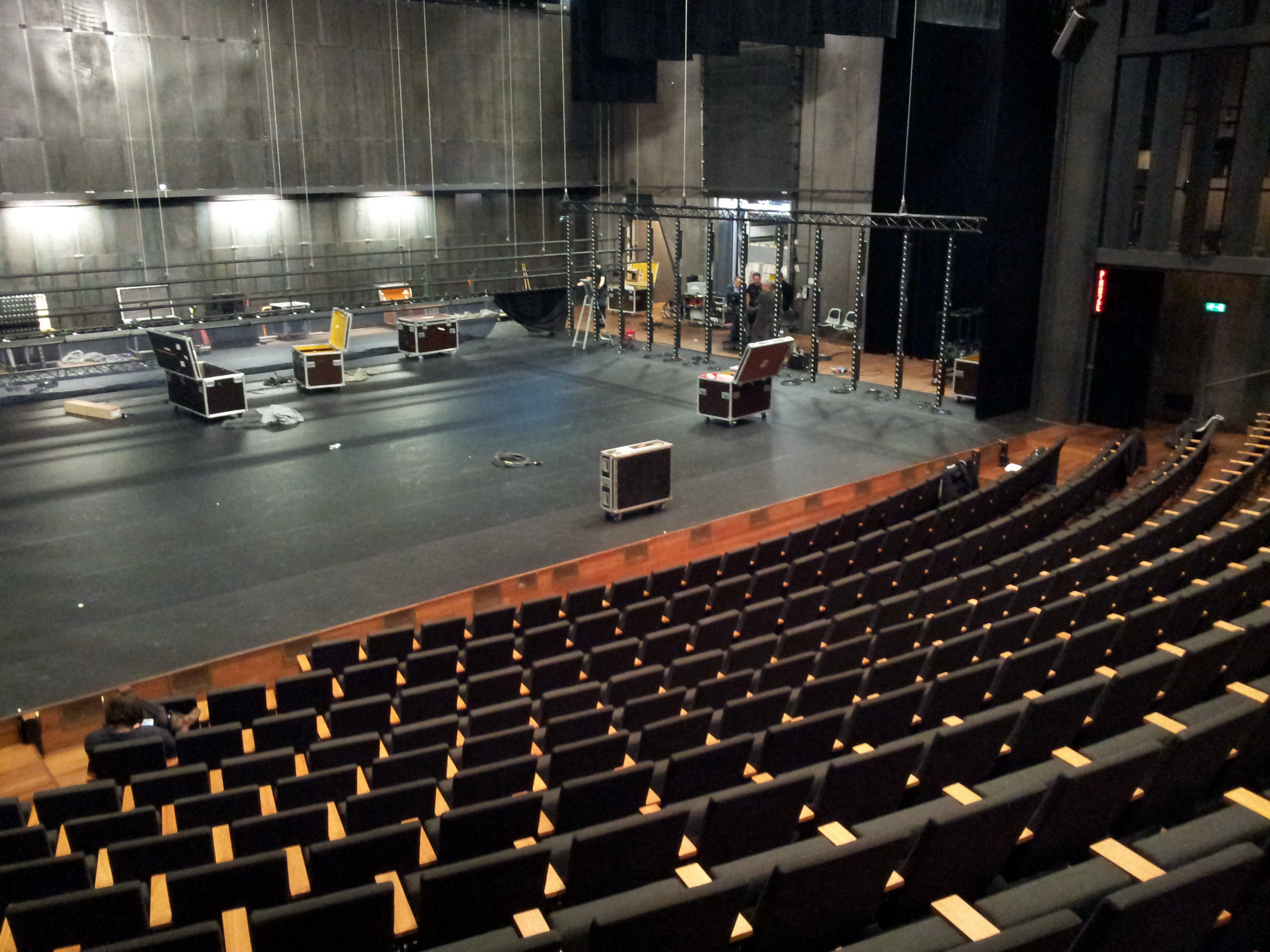
- Rabo Zaal, Toneelgroep Amsterdam's main stage in Stadsschouwburg Amsterdam
- Interactive map of Toneelgroep Amsterdam
- Address: Marnixstraat 427; Amsterdam; Netherlands

Website
- www.toneelgroepamsterdam.nl

Toneelgroep Amsterdam is the largest repertory company in the Netherlands. Its home base is the Amsterdam Stadsschouwburg, a classical 19th century theatre building in the heart of Amsterdam. In 2018 Toneelgroep Amsterdam merged with Stadsschouwburg to form Internationaal Theater Amsterdam.

== History ==
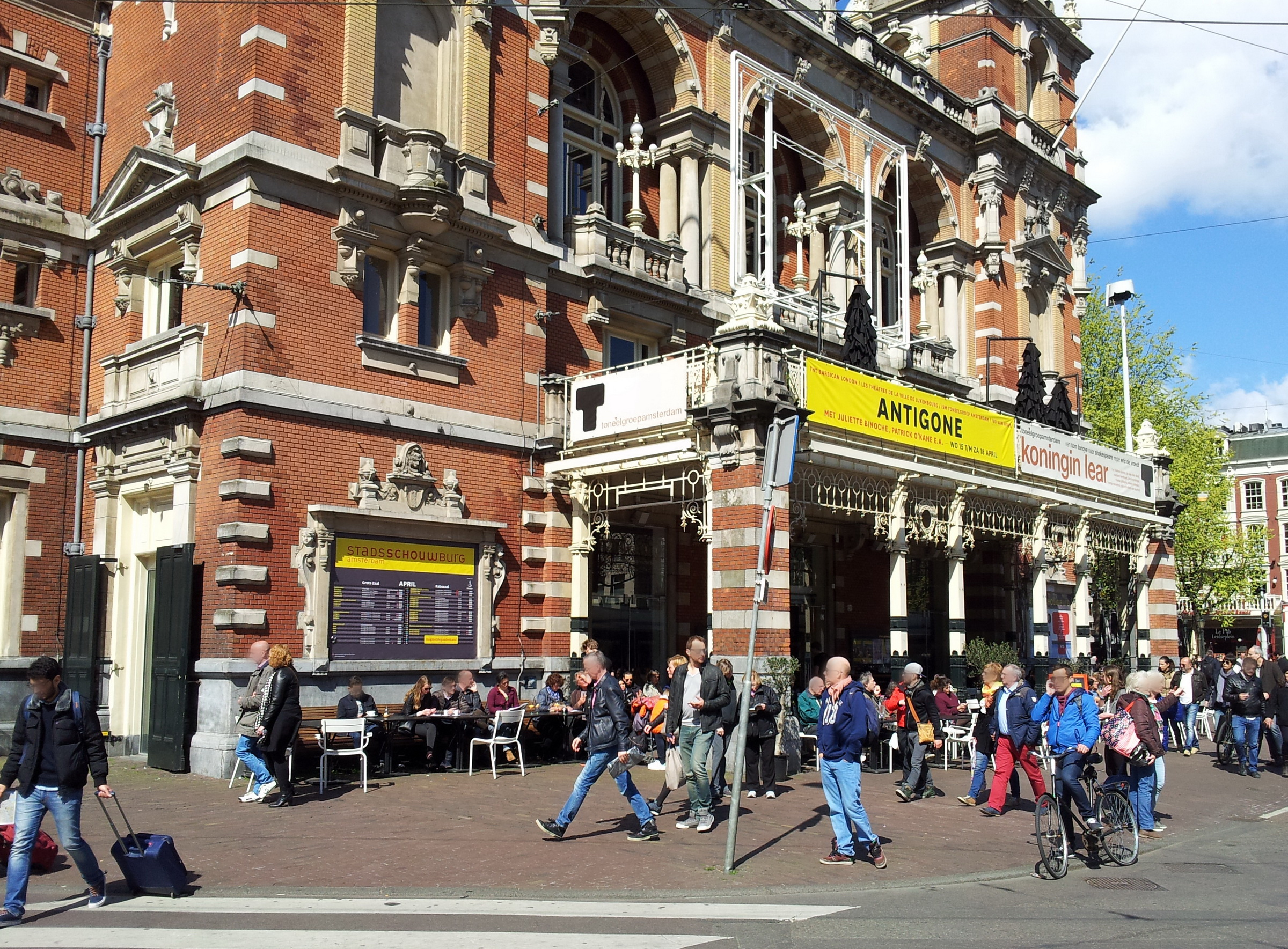
Stadsschouwburg in 2015 advertising two TA productions: Antigone and Queen Lear

The Dutch Company Toneelgroep Amsterdam started in 1987 through a merger of Toneelgroep Centrum and Publiekstheater with Gerardjan Rijnders as its artistic director. His montage-method of creating plays and his avant-garde stagings of classic plays were very influential in the Netherlands, as well as abroad. Following the fusion, artistic director Jan Ritsema departed the group the same year, with Rijnders citing "insurmountable difficulties" and the leadership proclaiming that departure was necessary for the continued existence of the organization. The company struggled early on with attracting an audience to the Stadsschouwburg. Theater director Wim Bary heavily criticized their programmes for being too elitist and one-note. The personnel of the Stadsschouwburg were similar critical, with their spokesperson stating that the company had only fifty visitors on average.

In 1994, Toneelgroep Amsterdam moved to an empty warehouse at an old power plant in Amsterdam Oud-West, it received the name of Transformatorhuis. This would fulfill a long-time wish of artistic director Rijnders, who since the beginning wanted to have his own theater where he could have complete creative control. This was deemed an impossible ask for the Stadsschouwburg. The move caused problems with the city government, Ernst Bakker warned them if they stopped playing at the Stadsschouwburg, that had review how much subsidies the company would receive. The director of the Stadsschouwburg, Cox Habbema, echoed the sentiment underlining that this would create significant financial problems for the theatre if they lacked their own theatre company.

Flemish director Ivo van Hove became the company director in 2000. He and his long-time designer Jan Versweyveld broke through the confinements of the classical stage to rediscover the stage as a "location." For their production Faces (an adaptation of John Cassavetes's film) the audience watched the show lying in beds.

In 2023, van Hove stepped down as the artistic director after 22 years. Eline Arbo was appointed as his successor and took over the function on September 1, 2023. The following year, newspaper NRC published an investigation into the alleged culture of fear and cover up by TGA and ITA leadership under the tenure of van Hove. According to their reporting, actress and whistleblower Hélène Devos, had reported cases of misconduct including physical and mental abuse by some of her fellow actors, these complaints were either ignored of covered up. In a separate independent investigation done by the external investigation firm Verinorm who concluded that one in third of the workers had dealt with misconduct, such as bullying, abuse of power, overworking, discrimination, sexual misconduct and physical violence. A week later, ITA cut off their remaining ties with van Hove and the whole supervisory board resigned immediately.

== International ==
Many of Toneelgroep Amsterdam's productions travel abroad. For instance, van Hove's adaptation of several of Shakespeare's plays, presented under the title Roman Tragedies, was shown at the major European theatre festivals (Wiener Festwochen, Festival d'Avignon, Theaterformen). Opening Night, another adaptation of a Cassavetes film, was shown at the Brooklyn Academy of Music in New York in December 2008, and at Melbourne Festival in Australia in October 2010, which was van Hove's Australian debut. "Ivo van Hove's work has been groundbreaking in opening up audiences' understanding of classic texts and films. His work is unique, raw, shocking, surprising, hilarious – everything you want theatre to be – and he doesn't shy away from the ugly or the profane. In a word, stunning, with a capital 'S'." (Cate Blanchett)

== Company ==
Director: Eline Arbo Ensemble: Hélène Devos, Jip van den Dool, Fred Goessens, Janni Goslinga, Aus Greidanus jr, Marieke Heebink, Robert de Hoog, Hans Kesting, Hugo Koolschijn, Maria Kraakman, Ramsey Nasr, Chris Nietvelt, Celia Nufaar, Frieda Pittoors, Gijs Scholten van Aschat, Harm Duco Schut, Bart Slegers en Eelco Smits.

Eric de Vroedt is an established guest director at Toneelgroep Amsterdam.
