= Trinidad and Tobago Film Festival =

Trinidad and Tobago film festival ttff
- Location: Trinidad and Tobago
- Founded: 2006; 20 years ago
- Founded by: Bruce Paddington
- Website: ttfilmfestival.com

The Trinidad and Tobago film festival (stylised as "trinidad+tobago film festival" or "ttff") is a film festival in the Anglophone Caribbean. Launched in 2006, the festival takes place annually in Trinidad and Tobago in the latter half of September, and runs for approximately two weeks. It screens feature-length narrative and documentary films, as well as short and experimental films (shown during its "New Media" exhibits), with a focus on the Caribbean and the Caribbean diaspora.

== History ==
The festival has its origins in the Kairi Film Festival, a one-off event that took place over three days in November 2002 in Port of Spain. As stated on the official website, "The festival was initially conceived in 2005 by film historian, academic and producer, Bruce Paddington with the unique intention of showing only Caribbean films." The first Trinidad and Tobago Film Festival took place in 2006, and was supported by the Trinidad & Tobago Film Company, a state enterprise. Films screened included Sistagod, directed by Trinidadian filmmaker Yao Ramesar, and the documentary Calypso Dreams.

In 2007, the Festival expanded to its current length, and included, for the first time, screenings outside of Port of Spain, including Tobago. The Festival opened with Trinidadian filmmaker Frances-Anne Solomon's Canadian feature film A Winter Tale. One of the films shown was the Trinidad and Tobago classic Bim (1974), directed by Hugh A. Robertson.

In 2008, the cable television provider Flow became the festival's presenting sponsor, and ttff expanded further to include technical workshops, and began a partnership with the University of the West Indies. As Marina Salandy-Brown (at the time executive director) noted, this third edition of the festival featured "sixty-seven films, shorts and prize-winning features including comedy, drama and animation." Among the festival's guests that year was the British artist and filmmaker Isaac Julien.

The 2009 festival (ttff/09) opened with the film Rain, written and directed by Maria Govan of the Bahamas. 2009 also saw the inclusion of jury prizes. Guests that year included the Mexican filmmaker Carlos Reygadas, director of the Cannes Film Festival Jury Prize-winning Silent Light, and Hilton Als, theatre critic for The New Yorker magazine. In 2010, the festival held a retrospective of the films of Brazil's Daniela Thomas, and entered into a partnership with the Zanzibar International Film Festival.

In 2011, the ttff/11, in association with sponsor RBC Royal Bank, hosted the first Focus: Filmmakers' Immersion, an intensive three-day workshop for emerging Caribbean filmmakers. The Festival opened with the Academy Award-nominated animated feature Chico & Rita, and recognised the 100th anniversary of the film industry in T&T with an exhibition, sponsored by bpTT. The Festival's first lifetime achievement award was also handed out, to musician, actor and activist Harry Belafonte, and for the first time screenings were held at the historic Little Carib Theatre.

The 7th edition of the Festival to date took place in 2012 (ttff/12). More than 120 films—features and shorts—were screened, with nearly one-third of those films coming from T&T. There was a spotlight on Canadian cinema, which included several films by Caribbean-Canadian directors. The Festival's industry section included the launch of a Caribbean Film Fund by Tribeca Film Institute and WorldView (an initiative of the Commonwealth Broadcasting Association), and a presentation by the African, Caribbean and Pacific group of countries (ACP) on their film fund.

ttff/12 also saw the expansion of the jury awards, which now consists of awards for local and Caribbean and diaspora films, plus films about the region by international filmmakers. The opening night film was the documentary Marley; its director, Kevin Macdonald, was in attendance.

In December the ttff screened a showcase of films at the Havana Film Festival, the largest and longest-running festival in the Caribbean. The ttff has also entered into partnership agreements with other festivals in the region: FEMI in Guadeloupe, the Curaçao International Film Festival, and the Dominican Republic Global Film Festival. The ttff also has a partnership with StudioFilmClub, a weekly Port of Spain cine-club, run by the artist Peter Doig.

The 2013 edition of the Festival ran from 17 September to 1 October. The opening film was Half of a Yellow Sun, a Nigerian-British co-production starring Thandie Newton and Chiwetel Ejiofor, and which had its world premiere at the Toronto International Film Festival, several weeks prior to the ttff/13. More than 140 films were screened at the ttff/13, with the jury prize for Best Narrative Feature going to Melaza, written and directed by Carlos Lechuga of Cuba.

The ttff/13 also included a retrospective of some of the films of pioneering black-British filmmaker John Akomfrah, while the New Media programme entered its third year, with Jamaican artist Olivia McGilchrist claiming top prize for her performance piece Native Girl. The Festival's industry programme, meanwhile, had as its centrepiece a three-day conference, co-hosted by UNESCO, on the development of the Caribbean film industry.

In 2014, at the ninth edition of ttff (16–30 September), the Festival introduced several new initiatives. These included a youth jury prize, for a film voted on by a jury of five young people, and the Amnesty International Human Rights Prize for the Caribbean film that best treats with a human-rights issue. The industry programme, meanwhile, included a producers' lab hosted by European Audiovisual Entrepreneurs, Europe's leading training organisation for producers, and a film appreciation class, hosted by British film journalist Kaleem Aftab.

2014 also saw a presentation on the Caribbean Film Mart and Film Database, which will be launched in 2015. Both initiatives—which are co-financed by the ACP Cultures+ Program, funded by the European Union (European Development Fund) and implemented by the ACP Group of States—are intended to strengthen the production and distribution of Caribbean films through two main actions: the implementation of a film market through the framework of the annual ttff, and the development of an online database of regional films and filmmakers.

Outside of September, the ttff has a programme of free film screenings that takes place in communities across the country. The festival also holds occasional screenings at its Port-of-Spain headquarters.

In 2019, the festival came under the care of the Filmmakers Collaborative of Trinidad and Tobago (FILMCO), and took place as part of the 2019 Carifesta event.

During the years 2020 to 2022, due to COVID-19 and resulting local "lockdowns" on in-person activities, the festival delved into livestreaming and online screenings. These proved to be quite successful, and allowed the festival to reach audience members of the Caribbean diaspora much more easily than years prior.

== Main initiatives ==
- Promoting Caribbean films The Trinidad and Tobago film festival is a celebration of the best in film from the English, French, Spanish and Dutch Caribbean, as well as the Caribbean diaspora. The festival also curates films from contemporary world cinema.
- Promoting the Caribbean film industry The festival seeks to promote indigenous filmmaking not only through screening films by local and regional filmmakers, but also by hosting guests, and workshops on technical aspects of filmmaking, as well as panel discussions on marketing, co-productions etc., and networking events.
- Reaching out to rural communities In keeping with its tagline—"You’re in Focus"—the festival is committed to promoting the culture of viewing indigenous films throughout Trinidad and Tobago by hosting film screenings in communities outside of the main urban centres. These screenings are free of charge to the public.

== Prizes ==
One of the main features of the festival is the awarding of prizes to the best films. Juries made up of local, regional and international film industry professionals awards prizes for Best Narrative Feature, Best Documentary Feature, Best Short Film, Best Trinidad and Tobago Feature and Best Trinidad and Tobago Short, among other prizes. Each award comes with a cash prize. In addition, there are audience awards for Best Dramatic Feature, Best Documentary Feature and Best Short Film.

== See also ==
- Cinema of the Caribbean
