= National Team Unity =

- Abbreviation: NTU
- Leader: Ramesh Lawrence Maharaj
- Founded: 2001
- Dissolved: approx. 2003
- Split from: United National Congress
- Colors: Red Yellow Blue

National Team Unity (NTU) was a political party in Trinidad and Tobago led by Human Rights lawyer and former Attorney General Ramesh Lawrence Maharaj.

Founded as Team Unity, to contest party elections within the United National Congress in 2001, the slate of candidates was led by Maharaj. Team Unity won 21 of 24 contested executive posts including the Deputy Leadership (won by Maharaj).

Later that year a rift with UNC leader Basdeo Panday led Maharaj, together with Oropouche Member of Parliament Trevor Sudama and Naparima MP Ralph Maraj, to leave the party. This caused the UNC to lose its parliamentary majority, forcing national elections.

Renaming itself National Team Unity, the party contested the 2001 general elections, winning 2.5% of the vote but no seats. It did not contest the 2002 general elections.

By 2003 the NTU was described as "apparently defunct", with Maharaj looking to start a new political vehicle. He would later rejoin the United National Congress.
