= Sensei Redenshon =

- Directed by: German Gruber, Jr.
- Written by: Ewoud Bon; German Gruber, Jr. Alejandra Sanchez Gruber
- Produced by: Alejandra Sanchez Gruber
- Starring: Raul de Windt; Redfern Regales; Brian Pietersz; Merietza Haakmat; Milushka Birge; John Zhu; Rudolfo Valentino Croes; Eddie Kin Hong Wong; Steven Lacroes; Benazir Charles
- Cinematography: Ewoud Bon; Stijn Hoekstra
- Edited by: Fernando Rodrigues
- Music by: Sjoerd Limberger; Herman Witkam
- Distributed by: Provider Films / Full Color Entertainment
- Release date: November 28, 2013
- Running time: 110 minutes
- Country: Curaçao
- Language: Papiamentu

Sensei Redenshon is a 2013 action drama-martial arts film produced by Alejandra Sanchez Gruber and directed by independent Curaçaoan filmmaker German Gruber Jr.

The spoken language of the entire film is Papiamentu, but subtitles are shown and are available in both Dutch and English.

== Synopsis ==
After being released from prison, a man will have to fight his past to recover the love of his son. After his past in the world of Illegal street fighting and gambling got him sentenced, Sandro comes out of prison searching to rescue the relationship with his only son. Shendel is about to turn 20; his obsession with easy money has led him to follow his father footsteps into the world of underground fights. Shendel is about to take part in one of the tournaments. In order to protect his son and win back his trust, Sandro will have to confront his toughest test yet.

== Cast ==
- Raul de Windt as Sandro
- Redfern Regales as Shendel
- Brian Pietersz as Alex
- Merietza Haakmat as Gabriela
- Milushka Birge as Vera
- John Zhu as Wang
- Rudolfo Valentino Croes as Bennie
- Eddie Kin Hong Wong as Sensei
- Steven Lacroes as Bara
- Benazir Charles as Chantal

== Release ==
The film premiered in Curaçao and Aruba on 28 November 2013, at The Cinemas movie theaters in Willemstad and Oranjestad on the same day. It was then featured in theaters in Bonaire, Sint Maarten and the remaining Dutch Caribbean islands as well. After a year of featuring in various film festivals, the film premiered in the Netherlands on 24 September 2015 at the Pathé theaters in Amsterdam, Rotterdam and The Hague becoming the first Antillean film to be featured in Dutch movie theaters in 20 years. The film was also presented at various film festivals, including the Trinidad and Tobago Film Festival (Port-of-Spain), The America's Film Festival (New York City), Caribbean Film Festival (London), Curaçao International Film Festival Rotterdam (Willemstad), SCENECS International Debut Film Festival (Hilversum) and the World Cinema Film Festival (Amsterdam).
