= Films set on Devil's Island =

The French penal colony on Devil's Island was in operation from 1852 to 1946. Large numbers of mostly Hollywood films sere either set on the island or featured characters both real (Alfred Dreyfus and Émile Zola) and fictional (The Phantom of the Opera) who had escaped from it. The French Government took a dim view of these films and banned several of them.

To avoid the usual French protests on films depicting Devil's Island, the producers of the 1935 film King of the Damned gave all locations Spanish names and set the film in the Caribbean.

== Films set on Devil's Island ==
- Condemned (1929)
- The Broken Melody (1934)
- The Devil-Doll (1936)
- The Life of Émile Zola (1937)
- Mysterious Mr. Moto (1938)
- Devil's Island (1939)
- Strange Cargo (1940)
- Passage to Marseille (1944)
- The Return of Monte Cristo (1946)
- We're No Angels (1955)
- Hell on Devil's Island (1957)
- I Accuse! (1958)
- Terror of the Bloodhunters (1962)
- Women of Devil's Island (1962)
- I Escaped from Devil's Island (1973)
- Papillon (1973)
- Prisoner of Honor (1991)
- Papillon (2017)
- An Officer and a Spy (2019)
