= Blinded (2006 film) =

- Directed by: Anderson Quarless
- Written by: Anderson Quarless
- Produced by: Anderson Quarless
- Starring: Deleon Walters; Tahira Carter
- Edited by: Jacqueline Bailey
- Release date: 2006
- Running time: 80 minutes
- Country: Grenada

Blinded (2006) is a Grenadian feature film about domestic violence directed by Anderson Quarless and starring Deleon Walters and Tahira Carter. It was the first full-length film entirely produced in Grenada.

== Plot ==
Clara meets John at a particularly vulnerable time in her life. She is "blinded" by love and he becomes her world. The intense relationship then becomes violent and Clara is forced to take drastic action to protect herself and their son Chris.

== Cast and crew information ==
This film has an entire local cast and crew, and was filmed in a various locations throughout Grenada, Carriacou and Petite Martinique including beaches, waterfalls and other scenic locations.

- Deleon Walters as John
- Tahira Natalie Carter as Clara
- Bassanio Nicholas
- Lindon "Fatman" George
- Claudia Morgan-Carter

== Distribution ==
The movie premiered to Grenadian audiences on January 28, 2006, at the Grenada Trade Center and February 4, 2006, at St. George's University.

== Reception ==
The movie received international recognition when it was selected for the 2007 New York International Independent Film and Video Festival.

== See also ==
- List of Caribbean films
