= The Right and the Wrong =

1970 Trinidadian and Tobagonian drama film

- Directed by: Harbance Kumar
- Screenplay by: Freddy Kisoon
- Starring: Angela Seukaran; Gloria David; Ralph Maharaj; Jesse Macdonald; Marc Mathews
- Music by: Antonio Prospect; Ved Pal
- Production companies: De Luxe Films; Anglo-Overseas Film Distributors
- Distributed by: Anglo-Overseas Film Distributors
- Release dates: 1970 (Trinidad and Tobago); September 1971 (United Kingdom)
- Running time: 103 minutes (6,200 s)
- Country: Trinidad and Tobago
- Language: English
- Budget: US$50,000

The Right and the Wrong is a 1970 Trinidadian and Tobagonian drama film directed by Harbance Kumar, in which Trinidadian slaves and indentured labourers revolt against their cruel English owner. Along with The Caribbean Fox (also directed by Kumar), it was one of the first films natively produced not only in Trinidad and Tobago, but also the English-speaking West Indies. Despite mediocre reception, it was a hit in its native country and was screened in several other Caribbean nations.

== Synopsis ==
In the British West Indies, Indian indentured labourers and enslaved Africans on a Trinidad plantation revolt against their cruel English owner. Infighting between two factions of rebels—one yearning for the creation of a maroon community and peaceful ethnic unity, the other demanding an overthrow of the system—stands in the way of the campaign.

== Cast ==
- Angela Seukaran as Chanda
- Gloria David as Didi
- Ralph Maharaj as Shyam
- Jesse Macdonald as Jojo

Guyanese actor Marc Mathews also appeared in a lead role.

== Production ==
The Right and the Wrong was the first feature film to be natively produced in Trinidad and Tobago, and in turn the English-speaking West Indies. It was also one of the first two productions in either regard, the other being The Caribbean Fox; both were directed in 1970 by Harbance Kumar. Their production company, De Luxe Films, was a Trinidadian/Guyanese distributor of Indian cinema; Kumar also formed an outlet named Anglo-Overseas Film Distributors to produce them. Prior to their filming, Kumar supervised local subtitling of Indian films, and director of photography Robert Hawkins was an employee of Pearl & Dean's Trinidadian unit. Made for US$50,000, The Right and the Wrong was shot on an agricultural estate in Arouca with amateur actors and crewmembers.

== Themes ==
The London-area Kensington Post newspaper wrote that the film "comes out strongly in favour of non-violence and the teachings of Martin Luther King". Critic Bob Geurink of The Atlanta Journal-Constitution observed that "The mystique of Gandhi prevails throughout."

== Release and reception ==
Both of Kumar's features became popular in their native Trinidad and Tobago and in other Caribbean territories, even receiving a double-feature release overseas. Marketed as "a story of lust, passion and violence set in Trinidad at the time of slavery", The Right and the Wrong was also a hit in Guyana, Grenada, and Suriname, breaking box-office records in the latter two territories. The film received support from native audiences who were "proud that a small country could produce a feature film". Concerns over its "problematic representation of history and plantation life" led to Black Power demonstrations during its Guyanese run. At the Atlanta Film Festival, the film won a Gold Medal for photography.

Despite its financial success, The Right and the Wrong was criticised for its poor production values and acting, as well as its below-average script. Reviewers gave less than positive notices, but nonetheless supported the Caribbean's efforts to make their own films. In its native country, the Trinidad Express said that "the abominable low quality of its product is obvious to everybody." During its U.S. arthouse run in Atlanta, Bob Geurink found it "overdone" and said, "[While it] takes a commendably strong line against violence, [it] shows much less depth...when it deals with that always-complex topic: people." When released in Britain, the Monthly Film Bulletin's Richard Combs called it "penny dreadful material". In a 2009 issue of the Black Camera journal, Bruce Paddington and Keith Q. Warner found the premise of African and East Indian slaves working together anachronistic; the latter group did not arrive in Trinidad until emancipation was proclaimed.

== Legacy ==
At the time of his films' release, director Kumar was touted as the pioneer of Trinidad's nascent cinema industry. While his ambitions to make his country "the Hollywood of the West Indies" bore little fruit in the decades afterward, it would inspire others in the region to make their own productions. In a 2010 Caribbean Beat article, The Right and the Wrong was cited as one of several films spearheading the short-lived "Caribbean New Wave" movement.

== See also ==
- List of Trinidad and Tobago films
- The Harder They Come (1972), Jamaica's first feature film

== Sources ==
- Paddington, Bruce; Warner, Keith Q. (Winter 2009). "The Emergence of Caribbean Feature Films". Black Camera. 1 (1). Indiana University Press: 91–108. doi:10.2979/blc.2009.1.1.91. JSTOR 10.2979/blc.2009.1.1.91. S2CID 144560687.
