= Ralph Maraj =

Trinidad and Tobago politician, actor and teacher (born 1949)

- Born: January 21, 1949 (age 77)
- Education: Naparima College
- Occupations: Politician, actor, playwright, teacher
- Political party: People's National Movement; United National Congress; National Team Unity

Ralph Maraj (pronounced [rɑːlpʰə məɦɑːrɑːɟə]; born 21 January 1949) is a Trinidad and Tobago politician, actor, playwright, and teacher. He served as Minister of Foreign Affairs under a People's National Movement (PNM) administration, Minister of Communication and Information Technology under a United National Congress (UNC) administration, and was a founding member of National Team Unity before returning to the PNM to work as a speech writer for Prime Minister Patrick Manning. Prior to entering politics in 1991, Maraj worked as a teacher at Naparima College in San Fernando. He also attended that school. He wrote several plays, the most successful being Cynthia Sweetness. Maraj also starred in the movies The Right and the Wrong (1970) and Bim (1974), described by Bruce Paddington as "one of the most important films to be produced in Trinidad and Tobago".

Maraj entered politics in 1991. He won the San Fernando West seat in the 1991 General Elections on a PNM ticket. Maraj served as Minister of Foreign Affairs from December 1991 until 7 May 1995, when Prime Minister Manning announced in a television address that he was demoting Maraj to Minister Without Portfolio in the Office of the Prime Minister. Maraj claimed that this was the first he heard of this shift in his Ministerial duties. Later that year Maraj's sister, Occah Seapaul, Speaker of the House of Representatives, was removed from the position following a power struggle with Manning. After Seapaul's removal, Maraj defected from the PNM and joined the Opposition UNC. This reduced the PNM to an almost unworkable one-seat majority in Parliament. Manning was forced to call a General Election which he lost. Maraj contested the Naparima constituency on a UNC ticket and won. Maraj was re-elected to that seat in the 2000 General Election. In the subsequent UNC administration Maraj served as Minister of Communication and Information Technology until he resigned from the party, together with Ramesh Maharaj and Trevor Sudama, late in 2001. This defection cost the UNC its majority in Parliament. In the subsequent General Election, the UNC lost control of government, but Maraj lost his seat to newcomer Nizam Baksh.

Maraj resumed his theatre career in 2013, when his play The Saint was performed in San Fernando's Naparima Bowl.

== Bibliography ==
- Meighoo, Kirk. 2003. Politics in a Half Made Society: Trinidad and Tobago, 1925-2002. ISBN 1-55876-306-6
