= Hulusi =

Free reed wind instrument

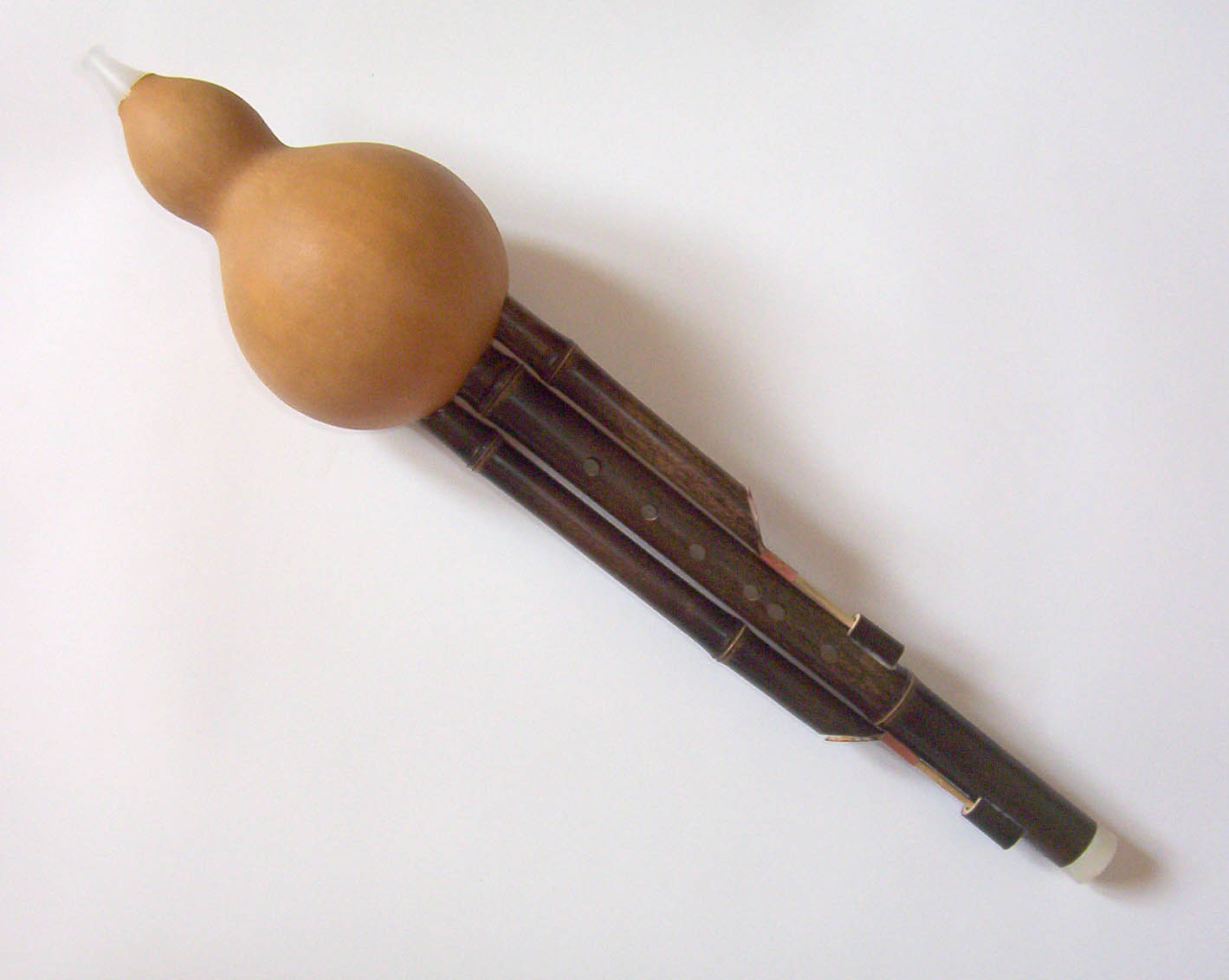
A hulusi

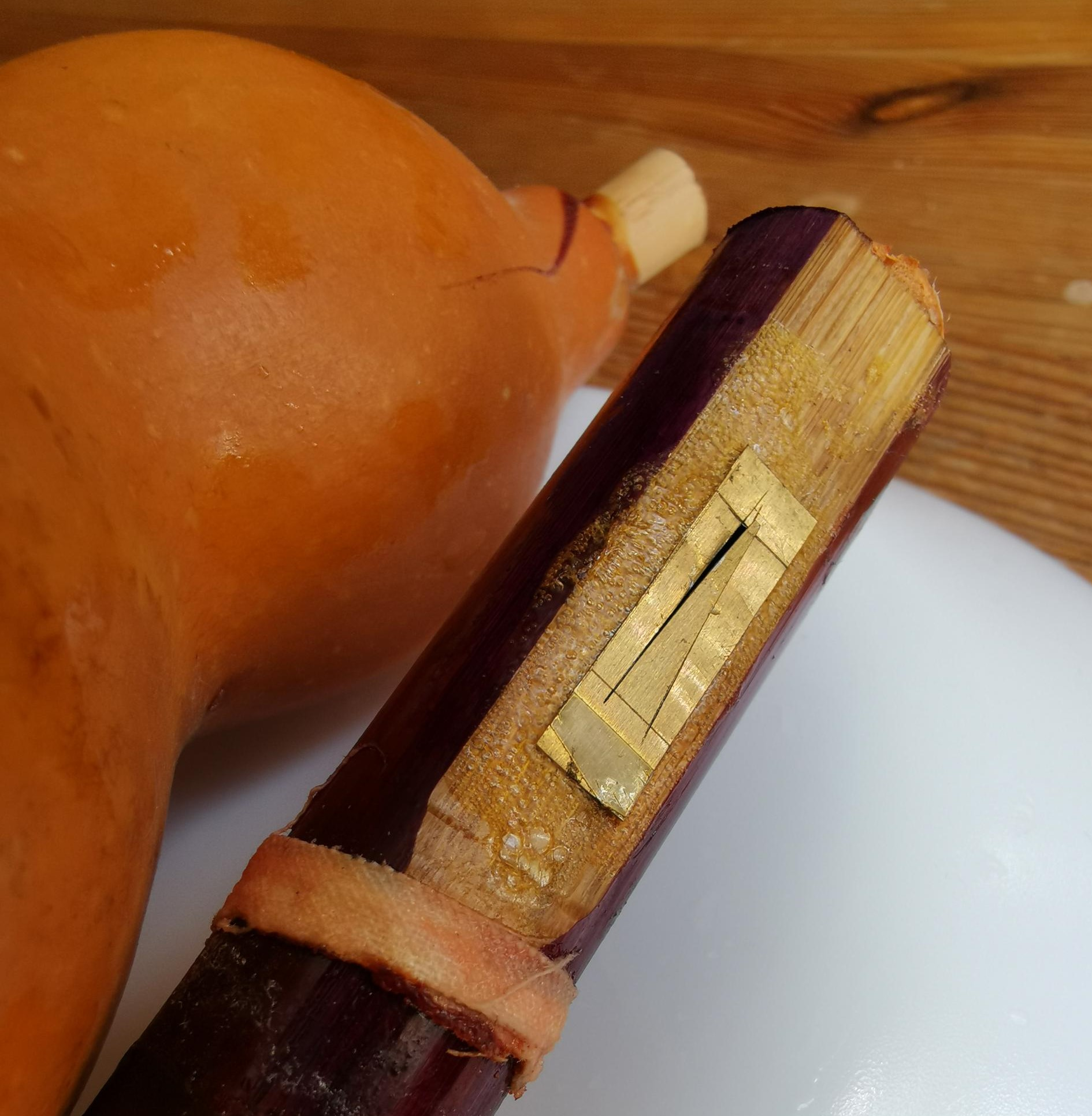
The free reed of a hulusi

Hulusi

The hulusi (simplified Chinese: 葫芦丝; traditional Chinese: 葫蘆絲; pinyin: húlúsī), also known as the cucurbit flute and the gourd flute, is a free reed wind instrument from China, Vietnam, and the Shan State, played also by the indigenous people of Assam. It is held vertically and has three bamboo pipes that pass through a Calabash gourd wind chest. The central pipe has finger holes for playing melodies, while the outer pipes typically function as drones, although one may be purely ornamental. Advanced configurations have keyed finger holes similar to a clarinet or oboe, which can extend the range of the hulusi to include an extra few notes above or below the octave.

The hulusi was originally used primarily in the Shan State of Myanmar, Yunnan province in southwest China, and Assam in northeastern India by a number of ethnic-minority groups, in particular the Dai people who call the instrument "pi lamtao" (Chinese: 筚朗叨 or 筚郎叨); the word pi means "woodwind instrument," and the word lamtao comes from namtao, meaning "gourd." Other ethnic groups have their own names for the instrument: the Achang call it paileweng (拍勒翁), the De'ang call it 'wogebao (渥格宝), and the Wa call it baihongliao (拜洪廖).

The hulusi has gained nationwide popularity throughout China and is also played by various indigenous ethnic groups of Assam. Similar to the popularity of the harmonica in the West, it has inspired the production of modified versions beyond its original regional communities. In Vietnam, the instrument is referred to as the sáo bầu, which means "gourd flute." Like the related free reed pipe called bawu, the hulusi has a pure, mellow clarinet-like sound.

The instrument’s early history is poorly documented; it was adapted for stage performance after 1949, and concert models were developed from the late 20th century.

A similar instrument called hulusheng is a mouth organ with a gourd wind chest.

== Etymology ==
The name hulusi comes from the Mandarin Chinese word húlu (葫蘆絲/葫芦丝), meaning "Calabash gourd," and si, meaning "silk" (referring to the instrument's smooth tone). It is used as an umbrella term for a number of related instruments with varying local names. The Chinese name hulusi has long been questioned by scholars. The alternative huluxiao has been proposed and opposed, and Wang Jiafu (2008) argued for the name hulusheng. Liu traces the confusion to inconsistent Chinese transcriptions of the Dai name.

The Dai name is /pi: la:m tao/, written in Chinese as bilangdao. In the southwestern Tai languages, /pi:/ generally names reed-pipe instruments and /la:m tao/ means gourd. The Dai name remains in use even for instruments heavily altered for the market. Other local names include huluxiao (Achang), and baihongliao (Wa). The instrument is called "pi namtao" in Lue language (Sipsong Panna), Khun language (Kengtung), Yuan language (Northern Thailand), Lao language and Thai language. It is also called Huluxi in Assam.

== Construction ==
In one documented example, all three pipes of the hulusi are bamboo and their upper ends are enclosed in a windchest made from a small double gourd, with a small wooden tube at the apex serving as the air duct. The melody pipe is essentially a bawu: it is closed at the top by a natural node, its inner nodes are bored out to leave a cylindrical bore, and a thin copper reed plate in a plastic frame is set into a rectangular opening in the pipe wall near the closed end. The melody pipe has eight holes: six finger holes on the front, a thumb hole near the top on the back, and a tuning hole at the bottom on the back. Some instruments have one drone. More often, a second drone sits on the opposite side, either with a reed tuned to a different pitch or without a reed, purely for symmetry. The drone pipe is built similarly but has no finger holes and is open at the bottom, where a cloth plug on a string can silence it. The third pipe is a dummy with no reed, the same length as the drone, and it serves only for visual symmetry.

A traditional hulusi has a small bottle-necked gourd as its wind chest. A bamboo melody pipe of about 25 cm or longer, plus one or two bamboo drone pipes, is set into the gourd's lower ("flower") end, traditionally with hardened beeswax and now usually a stronger adhesive. Additives vary with locality: pine rosin for stickiness, plant oils against cracking, insect resins for a lower melting point, and ash. In one Achang village the resin comes from ants.

A thin blowpipe is mounted into the neck. The melody pipe has six or more finger holes. Near its closed end, inside the gourd, sits a thin triangular free reed in a rectangular frame, like that of the bawu. Reeds have been made of bamboo, bronze, or silver. Liu describes silver and brass reeds made by Achang makers. Silver is softer and less elastic, and cannot be played as loudly. One documented modern example uses a copper reed plate in a plastic frame. One acoustic study describes copper free reeds, in which pipe length, not the reed's own frequency, sets the pitch, unlike in the accordion or harmonica. Liu groups the hulusi among free-reed pipes whose reed couples to the air column, calling such a reed "soft." He notes that metal reeds in such instruments can span an octave or more. Metal tongues in the region are generally pointed, and wider-ranging instruments tend to have more tapered tongues. The Bulang single-pipe instruments of Yongde has eight front holes and no thumb hole, which Liu takes as a sign of independent origin from the hulusi.

== Tuning and range ==
The traditional range is one octave or nine notes, and its scales are generally hexatonic or pentatonic. Drone pipes typically double the fundamental or other pitches. Every hulusi is tuned to a particular key. Liu observes that free-reed pipes cannot be overblown. On the region's free-reed pipes, a thumb hole above the finger holes extends the range by one degree but is often omitted because the highest note is hard to sound. Ma Xiaocheng says that is too narrow for the full melody of Phoenix Tail Bamboo Under the Moonlight, so Li Chunhua alternates an F instrument and a C instrument. Gen Dequan plays the whole piece on a C instrument.

== Playing technique ==
The player holds the instrument vertically. The left thumb and first three fingers cover the top four holes of the melody pipe, and the first three fingers of the right hand cover the rest. The player's lips surround the air duct and send a fairly forceful airstream through it. Sources differ on the airstream. Thrasher states that the reeds sound by an alternation of exhalation and inhalation. Vetter describes an instrument that sounds only when the player exhales. Liu says that on wind chest free reed pipes, airflow direction is hard to distinguish, and that many free reed pipes sound in both directions. The playing technique resembles that of other Chinese wind instruments, with sliding tones (huayin) especially common. Legato melodies with pitch bends and trills are idiomatic, and the instrument requires a fairly forceful airstream. The tone is relatively soft and reedy, like the bawu's. Because of its low volume, it is generally performed as a solo instrument.

== Types and variants ==
The hulusi occurs in many related forms under many names, and instruments are now mass-produced in factories and small workshops in various Chinese cities for domestic and foreign markets.

Liu groups related gourd wind chest instruments by pipe count. The Dai instrument has three pipes, the Achang three, the De'ang and cross-border Dai groups two, and the Bulang of Yongde one. The Jingpo and Lisu of Dehong have a double-pipe free reed instrument with a fingered melody pipe and a drone, described as a hulusi without the gourd. He regards the Bulang instrument as probably independent in origin.

Modern concert versions have expanded the instrument's capabilities through the addition of a copper wind chest, finger holes on the drone pipes, and an adjacent second melody pipe, which expand range and harmonic possibilities. Commercial versions may also use double-bellied gourds and feature plugged or reedless drone pipes.

== Repertoire and notable performers ==
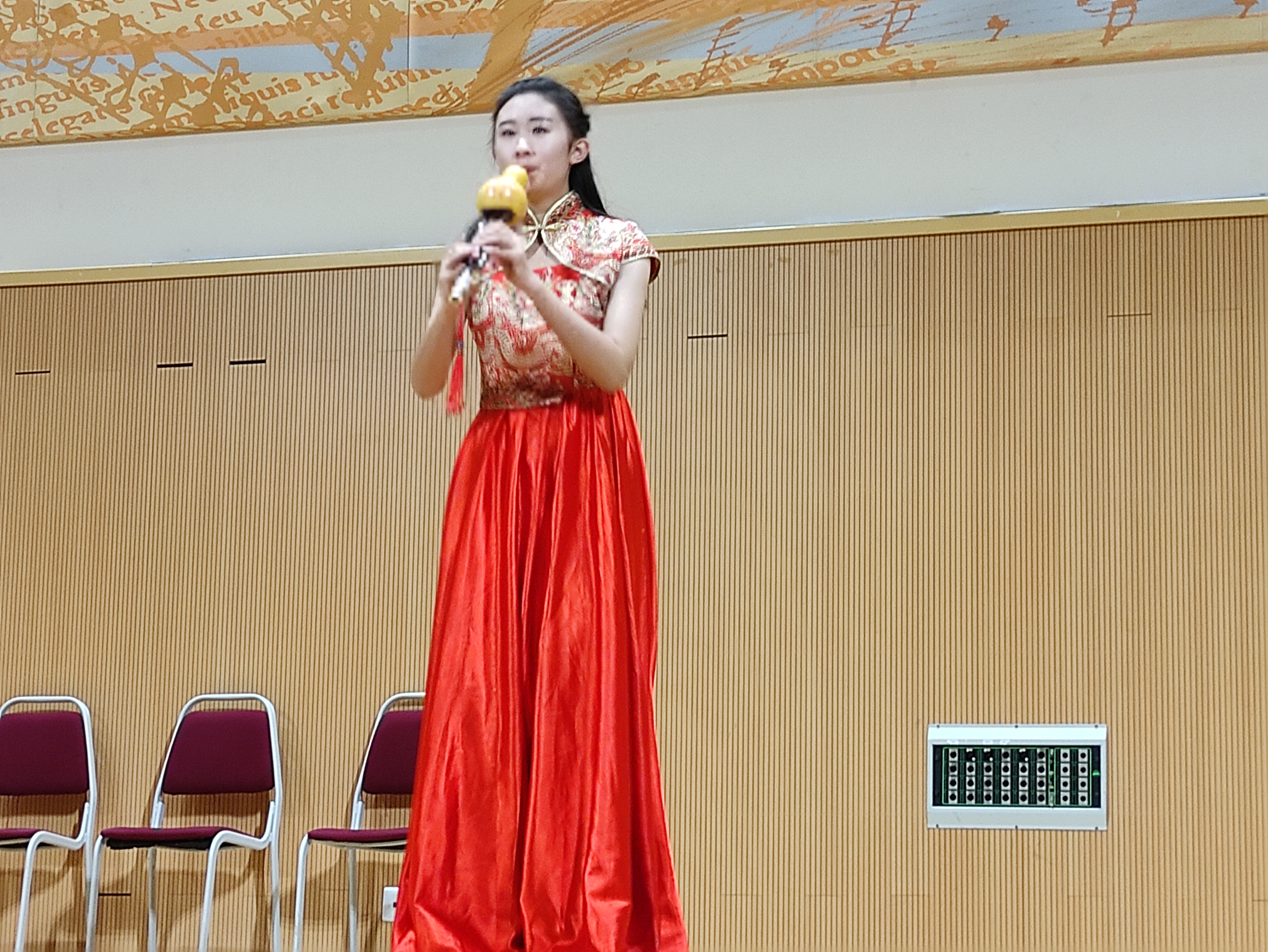
A member of NENU Folklorical Orchestra performing in Torrent, Valencia.

Ma Xiaocheng credits Shi Guangnan with creating well-known piece Phoenix Tail Bamboo Under the Moonlight,（Chinese: 月光下的凤尾竹）in 1979. He calls it one of the most representative works of hulusi music, a must-learn beginner's piece, and a signature work of Dai musical culture. Gen Dequan's version was recorded in the 1990s and appears on his 2005 album Hulusi Solo Vol.1. Li Chunhua's arrangement appears on Joyful Hulusi.

A 2026 school study lists Long de chuanren （龙的传人）and Hetang yuese （荷塘月色）among the pieces taught.

Both regional types of the hulusi can play old mountain song melodies. Although the hulusi is still predominantly performed in Yunnan (China), Shan State (Myanmar) and Assam it has in recent years been adopted by European composers and performers.

== Cultural significance ==
Traditionally, the hulusi accompanied dance and served for personal entertainment. Liu relates this to a wider regional symbolism in which the gourd is a womb and the bamboo a phallus, and he suggests that switching to double-bellied gourds may erode the metaphor. Some traditional Dai find the double-gourd instruments unattractive. Han buyers prize the double gourd as a "treasure gourd."

It was also used in the musical life of several hill-tribe groups for courtship and recreation. Today it is part of regional Chinese folkloric ensembles, sometimes played by conservatory-trained Han Chinese musicians, and its sound is used to symbolize minority identity and inclusion within a nationalist Chinese society.

A 2026 case study of a middle school in Luancheng District, Shijiazhuang, describes a class-wide programme. Each week, one music lesson is devoted to music theory, fingering, and repertoire, with after-school rehearsals and tiered instruction. The authors cite the instrument's low cost, low entry threshold and suitability for large-class teaching. They list Long de chuanren （龙的传人）and Hetang yuese （荷塘月色）among the pieces taught, alongside introductions to Dai and Yi culture.

== See also ==
- Bawu
- Traditional Squares
- Pungi, a similar Indian instrument
