= The Sweetest Mango =

2001 film by Howard Allen and Mitzi Allen

- Official movie poster - The Sweetest Mango
- Directed by: Howard Allen
- Screenplay by: D. Gisele Isaac
- Produced by: Howard Allen; Mitzi Allen
- Starring: Jermilla Kirwan; Omar Mathurin
- Cinematography: Howard Allen
- Edited by: Howard Allen
- Music by: Andrew Dorsett
- Distributed by: HAMA Films
- Release date: 2001
- Running time: 105 minutes
- Countries: Antigua and Barbuda
- Language: English

The Sweetest Mango is a 2001 romantic comedy film, the first feature film produced in Antigua and Barbuda. It was directed by Howard Allen. Howard and Mitzi Allen were co-executive producers, and Joanne C. Hillhouse served as associate producer. The film was inspired by the real-life story of Howard and Mitzi Allen and written by D. Gisele Isaac. The film was intended as "millennium Project", marking the entry of the island country to the 21st century and the 3rd millennium. Actress Janil Greenaway would later serve as consul general of Antigua and Barbuda to Canada.

== Plot ==
The film's plot about the way "a couple met and fell in love", is reportedly based on real events. Film critic Anne Brodie cited the setting of the film in its native island country as helping it in managing to reflect "local life, climate and colour". She also found the "human scale and intimacy" of the relationship rather unusual for recent romance films. The story starts with Lovelyanne ‘Luv' Davies returning to her native Antigua after an extensive stay in Canada. She struggles to re-adjust to life on a relatively small island. The turmoil of her personal and professional life is further complicated by her involvement in a love triangle.

== Legacy ==
A decade after its release, Brodie donated her copy of the film to the Bell Lightbox Film Reference Library. The Library and its contents are available to the public, and she hoped that the film may be seen by a new audience.

== Cast ==
- Jermilla Kirwan as Lovelyanne Davies
- Omar Mathurin
- Janil Greenaway
- Julie Hewlett
- Mervyn Richards
- Berni Isaac
- Centelia Browne
- Denise Francis
- Heather Doram
