= Hugh A. Robertson =

American film director and editor (1932–1988)

- Born: May 28, 1932; Brooklyn, New York, U.S.
- Died: January 10, 1988 (aged 55); Los Angeles, California, U.S.
- Occupation: film editor
- Awards: Best Editing 1969 Midnight Cowboy

Hugh A. Robertson (May 28, 1932 – January 10, 1988) was an American film director and editor, born in Brooklyn, of Jamaican parents. While Robertson was credited as an editor for only three films, Midnight Cowboy (directed by John Schlesinger, 1969) earned him the BAFTA Award for Best Editing and a nomination for the Academy Award for Film Editing, making him the first African American person to be nominated for an Oscar in the editing category.

Robertson subsequently edited Gordon Parks' film Shaft (1971), which was his last credit as a film editor. By this time Robertson had turned to directing. In addition to television programs and documentaries, he directed the feature Melinda (1972). He spent most of his remaining life in Trinidad and Tobago. There he produced and directed the film Bim (1975) and ran a filmmaking school. He returned to the United States in 1986.
