= SistaGod =

- Directed by: Robert Yao Ramesar
- Written by: Robert Yao Ramesar
- Produced by: Robert Yao Ramesar
- Starring: Evelyn Caesar Munroe; Michael Cherrie; Nicole Minerve; Indigo Minerve; Matthew McHugh; Yashmin Campagne
- Narrated by: Evelyn Caesar Munroe
- Cinematography: Edmund I. Attong
- Edited by: Debra Lezama
- Music by: Anderson Cave; Ella Andall
- Release date: 2006
- Running time: 72 minutes
- Countries: Trinidad and Tobago
- Language: English

SistaGod is a 2006 Trinidadian fantasy drama, the first in a trilogy by director Robert Yao Ramesar. The film stars Evelyn Caesar Munroe, who also serves as the narrator of the story. She plays the role of Mari (the Sista God), who undergoes a transition from a girl who cheats death to a harbinger of death itself.

The film's musical score and Orisha songs are sung by female calypsonian Ella Andall. There are practically no visual effects and hardly any dialogue in the movie, instead emphasizing imagery. Trinidadian Carnival plays an integral part in the film, with the use of traditional characters.

== Plot ==
The film begins during the early 1990s. A white American soldier, serving in the Gulf War as a sniper, is washed ashore on Trinidadian soil. He is shell-shocked from the war, with the mindset of a 12-year-old child. He is taken care of by an Afro-Trinidadian nurse, who helps rehabilitate him, and they fall in love.

Mari, their daughter, was conceived in a cemetery. Because the girl is dark-skinned, the soldier denies that she is his child, and leaves the mother. The nurse goes insane and is taken to an asylum, where she spends day after day staring at photos of her and the soldier. Mari is taken in by “Nan”, her adopted Hindu grandmother, in St. Joseph, Trinidad. They live near the cemetery where she claims she hears the souls of the dead trying to resurface.

One day, out of curiosity, Mari picks and eats a bunch of poisoned berries from a tree. She does not die, but her tongue is darkened black. Nan creates an antidote for the poison using medicinal herbs.

Her mother is eventually released from the asylum and takes Mari to church, where they view a woman and her three children. The woman, in Mari's opinion, looks like Miss Universe. The three children (two boys and a girl) are her half-brothers and half-sister respectively. The two women stare at each other in the middle of the street, and both walk away.

At age eighteen, while Mari is sleeping, he has a premonition of the future and realizes that she is the New Messiah. Her presence on Earth will herald an event known as the “Apocalypso”, after which “everyone will disappear”.

Believing that Mari is possessed by a spirit, Nan hires a popular televangelist to exorcise her. Mari remains on her bed as the televangelist begins. As he speaks to her to be released from the spirit, she suddenly goes into convulsions and light illuminates from her mouth. The televangelist ultimately gives up, and assumes that Nan's house is possessed and is causing her adopted granddaughter to act strange. The decision is made to burn the house down, forcing Nan to stay by her sister's house. The loss of her home affects Nan, who dies a few days later. She is buried in a funeral pyre, using scraps from her house.

The televangelist returns to complete the demolition of Nan's house. He tries to console Mari by giving her an iguana that he caught. She eventually frees the iguana, after which it is run over by a vehicle. She glances into the car and sees the face of her father. Her father had returned to Trinidad years ago to open a pub, with its walls painted with images from the Gulf War.

Days later, Mari becomes pregnant. After learning of this, her mother threatens to fling herself off the top of a waterfall located near her hometown. Instead, she designs a Baby Doll costume for her daughter to wear. The Baby Doll, in Carnival mythology, is a teenage girl dressed in all white who wears a white mask to hide her shame for being pregnant at such an early age. Now in costume, Mari has adopted a new persona - SistaGod.

One day, Mari has a dream in which she is wearing the Baby Doll costume and “floating through the trees”. Her adopted grandmother floats with her, followed by her father, and the televangelist who has his arms outstretched with a Bible in his left hand. The dream ends, and Mari is shown walking away from the waterfall. Her mother arrives afterwards, walking towards it. She capsizes her head face down in the pool, with her hands outstretched, and drowns herself. The next day, Mari rushes to her father's home to tell him about her mother's death. Days later, he visits her grave. Mari arrives in the night, leaving candles to illuminate the tombstone. She then remembers her mother telling her that she will return to Earth in fire.

The next morning, the day before the Apocalypso, a Carnival procession begins. All the participants are dressed as traditional Carnival characters such as Burrokeets, Bats, Midnight Robbers, Bookmen, Dame Lorraines and Blue Devils. As a child, Mari could not take part in Carnival, but could only watch in fear and awe. Mari is now observing the celebrations as they become more intense and more frightening as the Blue Devils enter. Realizing that the end is near, Mari asks a nearby Bookman (who is holding a book containing names of souls going to Hell) if there is any room there for the rest of humanity. He tells her that Hell is currently overpopulated. Night creeps in and the Blue Devils continue their ranting and raving. The Apocalypso then begins.

The next morning, Mari is seen standing near a wall. The entire wall is scribbled with names. She is the human survivor of the Apocalypso and begins to walk through the empty streets. She assumes that the gods are the only other survivors, as she passes a gigantic statue of the Hindu monkey-god Hanuman.

She continues to walk aimlessly until she sits down in front of a tree. Her water breaks and she gives birth, as is symbolized by a light (similar to the one that illuminated her mouth during the exorcism) between her legs. The screen fades to black, with the words “The End of the Beginning” being shown as Mari's newborn child cries.
