= Bim =

- Directed by: Hugh A. Robertson
- Written by: Raoul Pantin
- Produced by: Harbance Kumar; Hugh A. Robertson; Suzanne Robertson
- Starring: Ralph Maharaj; Anand Maharaj; Anna Seerattan; Wilbur Holder; Lawrence Goldstraw; Joseph Gilbert; Hamilton Parris; Neville Labastide
- Cinematography: Bruce G. Sparks
- Edited by: Paul L. Evans
- Music by: Andre Michael Tanker
- Release date: 1974
- Running time: 100 minutes
- Country: Trinidad and Tobago
- Languages: Trinidadian and Tobagonian English; Trinidadian Hindustani

Bim is a 1974 Trinidad and Tobago film written by Raoul Pantin and directed by Hugh A. Robertson. It was described by Bruce Paddington as "one of the most important films to be produced in Trinidad and Tobago and ... one of the classics of Caribbean cinema".

In 1975 at the United States Virgin Islands Film Festival in St Thomas, Bim won a gold medal special jury award as "a film of unusual merit".

== Plot ==
Bim (pronounced Bheem) Singh is an Indo-Trinidadian teenage boy living in the rural Indian countryside of Chaguanas in Caroni County in central Trinidad with his parents and sister during the British colonial era. The character is based partly on Bhadase Sagan Maraj and partly on Boysie Singh according to historian Angelo Bissessarsingh. He is friends with a girl his age named Anna. His sister Ria is going to marry Ramdass, and Bim's father, Bhagwan Singh, a famous trade union leader and activist, is in a feud with rival Gopaul. On the day of Ria's wedding, Bhagwan Singh sends his men to kill Gopaul's two sons: Harry and Charlie. Sookdeo informs him that the men have killed Harry, but Charlie escapes. Bhagwan Singh orders whatever it takes for Charlie to be killed. Bim is seen with Anna throughout the wedding and his father's friends joke about him and Anna getting married. Later that night, while Bhagwan Singh and his family are enjoying the wedding festivities, Charlie arrives at Bhagwan Singh's house, kills him and shoots Bim.

After his father's funeral Bim is sent to live with his paternal aunt, Babsie and her Afro-Trinidadian husband, Balo in the suburban district of Belmont in the multiethnic capital, Port of Spain. Bim's uncle, Balo, is an abusive, racist, gambling addict and dockworker. He beats Babsie after she refuses to tell him if Bim's family sent any money. He steals the money sent by Bim's family for his schooling, after Bim, meeting him for the first time, tells him where the money is. He then beats Bim for not responding to his question and then tells him not to worry as he knows a good teacher to send him to. At his new school, Bim is the only Indian, and is ridiculed by his racist teacher Mr. Hudson and isolated and picked on by the Afro-Trinidadian students because of his coolie (Indian laborer) heritage. During a break the students, led by Pinhead, gang up against Bim and steal his book and verbally and physically abuse him. When he fights back, the students disperse as Mr. Hudson is making his way back and Pinhead threatens to deal with him after class. After class, Bim seeks Mr. Hudson's help who makes a mockery of Bim and pays him no mind. When he leaves class the students are waiting for him and Bim is forced to stab Pinhead as a means of defense to make it home alive. This incident leads to Bim's expulsion from the school, which causes a fight between Balo and him. He then runs away from home and spends the night in a cemetery.

The film flash-forwards and Bim is now an adult who goes by "Bim Bim" and is a vagabond who steals to get by in Port of Spain. He tries his hand in playing in a steelpan band but quits after an argument with the bandleader. After quitting, Bim and his friends Mango-head and Tallsocks try to rob a gas station where he knows the attendant but is interrupted when a police officer stops by and the attendant yells for help. He runs from the police and takes refuge at his friend, Wabham's, underground poker joint and brothel, where he gambles away most of his money and sleeps with Angela, a prostitute he frequents. Wabham tells him to go out of town for a while and promises to find something for him. The next morning, Bim is awakened by Corporal Leslie Joseph, who is revealed to be a corrupt cop who is paid off by Wabham. Corporal Joseph transports Bim in his trunk to Cedros by Wabham's friend The Captain, who is an Afro-Grenadian immigrant that is a fisherman and involved in smuggling. Tozo, The Captain's right-hand man tells Corporal Joseph that someone has been tipping off the police as they had a run-in with the cops the night before and that it was the fifth time in the last two months. The Captain meets Bim and takes a liking to him. Corporal Joseph tells The Captain that he is waiting for his payment for bringing Bim, and The Captain tells him to ask Wabham for the money. Later that night, The Captain and Bim are drinking and talking and The Captain asks Bim to tell him about the time that the notorious gangster Goldteeth was looking for Bim.

In a flashback, Bim is in a bar sitting and listening to music when approached by Goldteeth. Goldteeth tells Bim that he heard he's looking for him, but Bim gets scared and tells Goldteeth he wants no trouble and that he was only talking big. Goldteeth calls his girlfriend Suzy and asks if Bim is the one planning for his head and she confirms and Bim tells her to tell him that he was only joking with her. Goldteeth then makes a slight cut in Bim's forehead and tells him to remember who put it there. Back in the present-day, The Captain says he knew Goldteeth when he was a child and they share a laugh about it. The Captain tells Bim he should stop being called "Bim Bim". Bim tells him his real name is Bim Singh and The Captain says that he remembers who his father was and asks about his family. Bim reveals that his mother died three years ago and he could not go because he would be dead if he set foot in Caroni County again, and he says that his sister and brother-in-law moved to Venezuela and that he has no family left. The Captain tells him he also has no family and that family ties down a man and it is better to be alone. The Captain suggests he should be called Bim (pronounced Bim like dim).

In another scene in the Police Commissioner's office, Detective Jones tells the Police Commissioner about a boatload of illegal Grenadian immigrants found off the coast of Cedros who were waiting for someone to pick them up and that The Captain is a suspect, however, there is no evidence to prove it.

Back in Caroni County, Jalwat Singh, a distant relative of Bhagwan Singh and Bim, is campaigning against Charlie who now goes by Baba Charlie. However, even though the people dislike Charlie, they fear more the instability of what could happen when they get independence and the Blacks take over, and Jalwat says that Charlie is using race to control them. Late in the night, Charlie's men set fire to Jalwat's house and car, and Jalwat and his family barely escape.

Back in Cedros, The Captain reveals he knows Constable Joseph is a traitor ratting them out to the police. He tells the men that he plans to take Constable Joseph on a boat ride in the night and says that if he disappears, to tell anyone who asks that they have not seen him in weeks.

Back at the Police Commissioner's house, his wife Mary worries what will happen to them if Trinidad and Tobago become independent. The Police Commissioner gets a call and in another scene, Wabham is listening to the radio and it is revealed that the body of Constable Joseph was found off the sea in Cedros and that the British Parliament is debating Trinidad and Tobago's independence. The Police Commissioner visits The Captain to ask about the murder of Constable Joseph, and he denies having anything to do with it, even though the Police Commissioner strongly suspects him. In another scene, Ben Joseph, an Afro-Trinidadian political leader is giving a speech to a group of people about the upcoming election being important as it will determine the government of an independent Trinidad and Tobago. His character is based on the People's National Movement's leader and founder Eric Williams.

Back in Cedros, after months of no operations, The Captain and his men go out to smuggle more Grenadian refugees, but on his way back is captured by police, however, Bim gets away and steals a car from a couple having sex in the backseat. He goes to Wabham and tells what happened and that he could either kill a man or sleep with a woman. Bim tells Wabham that he knows he is scared since The Captain got captured by the police and fears for himself, so he warns Wabham not to do anything stupid and turn him in. Wabham sends a new girl from the country to sleep with Bim. Bim tries to forcibly sleep with her, but she is hesitant and tells him that she is a virgin. He then continues to force himself on her but recognizes she is Anna from his childhood. She is shocked to see him as Charlie had told everyone that he is dead. She tells Bim that Charlie has terrorized Caroni and made it impossible for people who were associated with his family to work in Caroni, so she got a job as a prostitute in Port of Spain. She also informs him of Jalwat Singh and that he is in San Fernando. They share an intimate moment together as flashbacks of their childhood are shown and she falls asleep in his arms. Wabham tells him a car has come to move him out and he threatens Wabham to give Anna another job and that she is his family.

In San Fernando, Bim meets Jalwat Singh who is cautious at first but then trusts Bim after Bim tells him his intention is to get revenge for his father's death. Jalwat takes Bim to the panchayat (group of village elders who make decisions) where they are willing to support Bim but caution him that this is more than Charlie and the labor union, it is about politics and being in the talk of independence as they fear what will happen to the Indians when Trinidad and Tobago becomes independent. Jalwat and Bim start campaigning and Charlie's men arrive but are stopped by Bim who pulls a gun on them and reveals that he is Bhagwan Singh's son. Charlie's men go back and tell him of Bim, who said he should have killed him back then. While on an outing by the river, Charlie is ambushed by Bim. Charlies tries to cut a deal with him, but Bim refuses and shoots and kills him after he tries to get away.

Bim then takes over as the union and political leader of the Indians and transforms himself into a politician and dons a mustache and is called Bim (pronounced Bheem) Singh, his original name, again. He tells Cutter to bring Anna back from Port of Spain after hearing that Wabham did not listen and kept Anna as a prostitute. He then silently tells Cutter what to do Wabham. Bim makes a speech to his supporters that he plans on forming a political party to run in the next general election and to represent and protect the rights and interests of Indo-Trinidadians and calls for unity between Afro-Trinidadians and Indo-Trinidadians, but that they are used to it if the Afro-Trinidadians want to live separate from Indo-Trinidadians. Later that night, he confesses his love for Anna and tells her that she is the only one he could trust and that she no longer has to work for Wabham.

After a tennis match, the Governor and the Police Commissioner discuss the politics of the island. The Governor urges the Police Commissioner to drop the probe into Bim, even though the Police Commissioner believes that Bim was involved in the murder of Constable Joseph. The Governor tells him that the people have forgotten the murder and their priorities have moved on to independence and that politics are dominated by race and the probe into Bim could be seen as racial, which the Police Commissioner vehemently denies and is insulted by. Bim and Jalwat are invited to the Governor's house. However, on the way there Bim is annoyed and voices his dissatisfaction with politics. After Bim leaves, Anna says she feels stifled and asks Cutter if she can go out, but he says that she can not leave without Bim's permission, however, she says it is just to the savannah and that he could come with her. Cutter then opens the gate and they go out. At the Governor's house, Bim gets drunk and insults a white sympathizer who admires his work for the Indians and tells her to come down to the sugar belt and help Indians cut cane if she was so concerned. He then walks out and the Governor overhears him further insulting the woman. As they are leaving they are approached by Ben Joseph the Afro-Trinidadian political leader. He rejects Ben Joseph's proposal to form an alliance for the upcoming general election, saying that Africans and Indians do not get together in politics and that he only approached him because of his power in the country and that he wants Bim to give him some. He then curses and makes a scene causing everyone at the Governor's house to hear him and says that he is fed up with politics and power and he leaves with Jalwat. While Anna and Cutter are walking the street, she is recognized by a former client from when she was a prostitute and he tries to kidnap her. While driving back home Bim sees them trying to kidnap Anna and gets out of his car. He shoots and kills the kidnappers in power-drunk rage, despite Jalwat telling him not to and the kidnapper begging for his life, and he ends the film with a scream.

== Cast ==
- Ralph Maharaj as "Adult Bim Singh"
  - Anand Maharaj as "Young Bim Singh"
- Anna Seerattan as "Adult Anna Bissessar"
  - Jennifer Ali as "Young Anna Bissessar"
- Wilbur Holder as "Wabham"
- Lawrence Goldstraw as "Police Commissioner"
- Joseph Gilbert as "Jalwat Singh"
- Hamilton Parris as "The Captain"
- Neville Labastide as "Corporal Joseph"
- Tony Lutchman as "Tozo"
- Dennis Mahabir as "Bhagwan Singh (Bim's Father)"
- Sonia Kowlessar as "Bhagwan Singh's Wife and Bim's Mother"
- W. Harrypaulsingh as "Charlie Gopaul"
  - Simon Bedasie as "Young Charlie Gopaul"
- Rose Hanuman as "Ria"
- Anthony Persad as "Ramdass"
- Errol Jones as "Ben Joseph"
- Grace Maharaj as "Babsie (Bim's Aunt)"
- Ronald Amoroso as "Balo"
- Ernest Rodriguez as "Pinhead"
- Daniel Warner as "Mr. Hudson (Teacher aka Godzilla)"
- Garnett Craigwell as "Tallsocks"
- Finbar Ryan as "Mango-head"
- Stafford Alexander as "Detective Jones"
- Herby Whiskey as "Goldteeth"
- Ava Regis as "Angela"
- Geddes Jennings as "Gas Station Attendant"
- Vernon Lloyd as "Governor"
- Ann Hilton as "Mary (Police Commissioner's Wife)"
- Kenneth Boodhu as "Heckler"
- Jennifer Gopaul as Jalwat Singh's wife
- Claire Laptiste as "Melba"
- Mulchan Seuchan as "Cutter"
- Anna Richardson as "Suzy"
- Helene Camps as "White Sympathizer"
- John Henderson as "Frenchy"
- Oliver Boodhu as "Chaitram"
- George Gogar as "Village Elder"
- Ramontar Malahoo as "Village Elder"
- Ramcharran Kissoon as "Village Elder"
- Latiff Mohammed as "Village Elder"
- Elaine Reid as "African Politician"
- Stanley Marshall as "African Politician"
- Errol Pilgrim as "African Politician"
- Linda London as "Maid"
- Clyde Alleyne as "Radio announcer"
